= Sega development studios =

Internal video game studios of Sega

This is a list of development studios owned by Sega, a Japanese video game developer and publisher based in Tokyo, Japan. Sega itself is a development studio of Sega Sammy Holdings, a company formed in 2004 after it merged with Sammy. Accompanied with the list is their history of game development. Also included are the companies that Sega has acquired over the years. For a full list of games developed and published by Sega, see List of Sega video games, List of Sega mobile games and List of Sega arcade games.

== 1960–1990 ==
During the early 1960s, Sega had around 40 developers. One of the developers was Hisashi Suzuki, who previously was in charge of autodesign at Tokyu Kogyu Kurogane, he changed jobs to Sega in 1964, which then was called Nihon Goraku Bussan. As the company grew, Suzuki recalls about eight departments dedicated to development, which were arcades, arcade cabinets and consumer products. Sega rarely outsourced their games, much like Namco and Taito, as it was hard to find other companies that could do design, manufacturing, marketing and maintenance all at once.

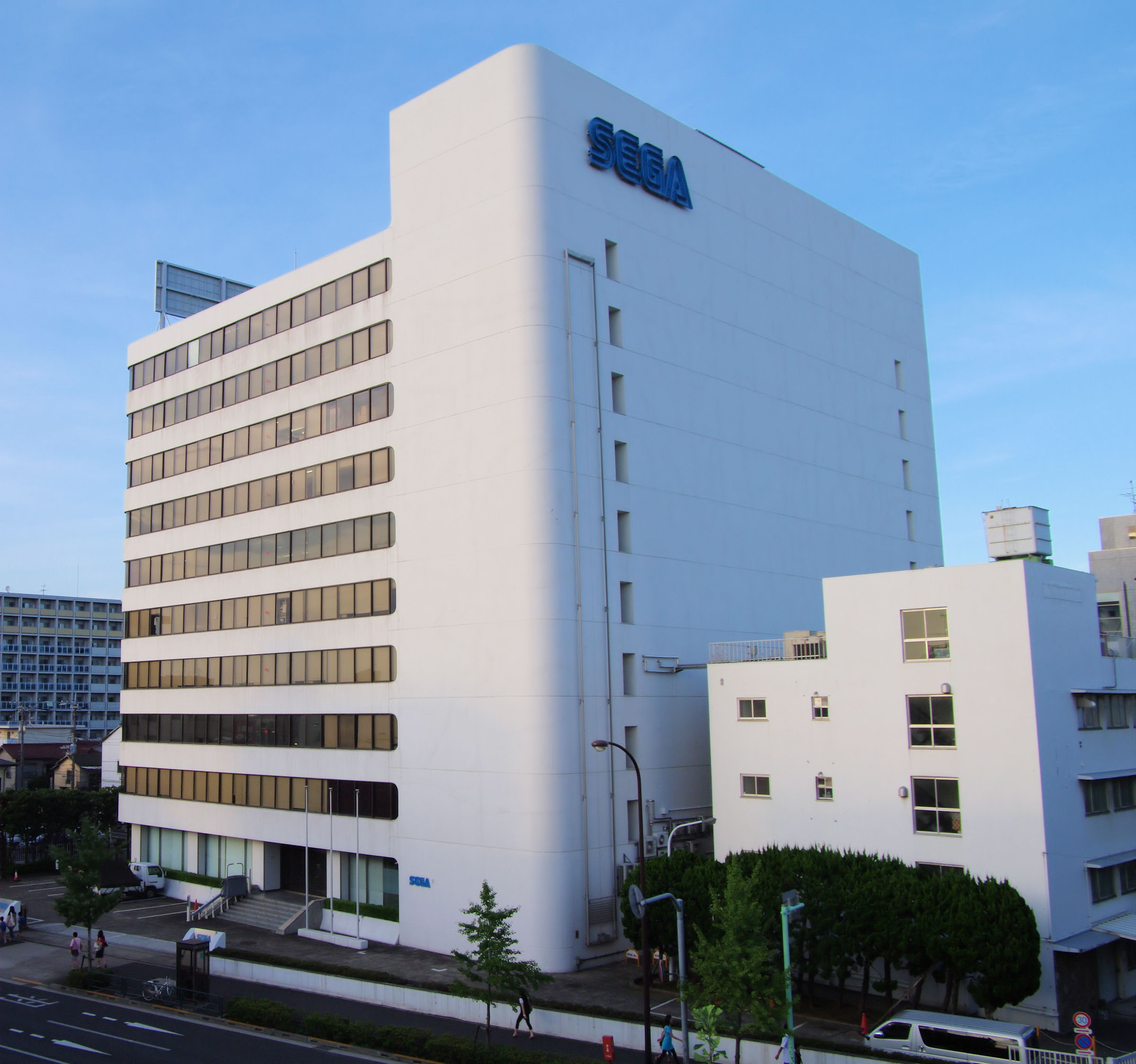
A new building for development was established in 1985.

Another early developer was Hideki Sato, who joined 1971. Sato has recalled that when he joined Sega, they were making pinball tables and electro-mechanical games, however still mainly sold jukeboxes. He became part of a development team that mainly had around 20 people. Sato was initially assigned to the part that made pinball tables, which were imported from America, but had modifications done to them so they would be more fun.

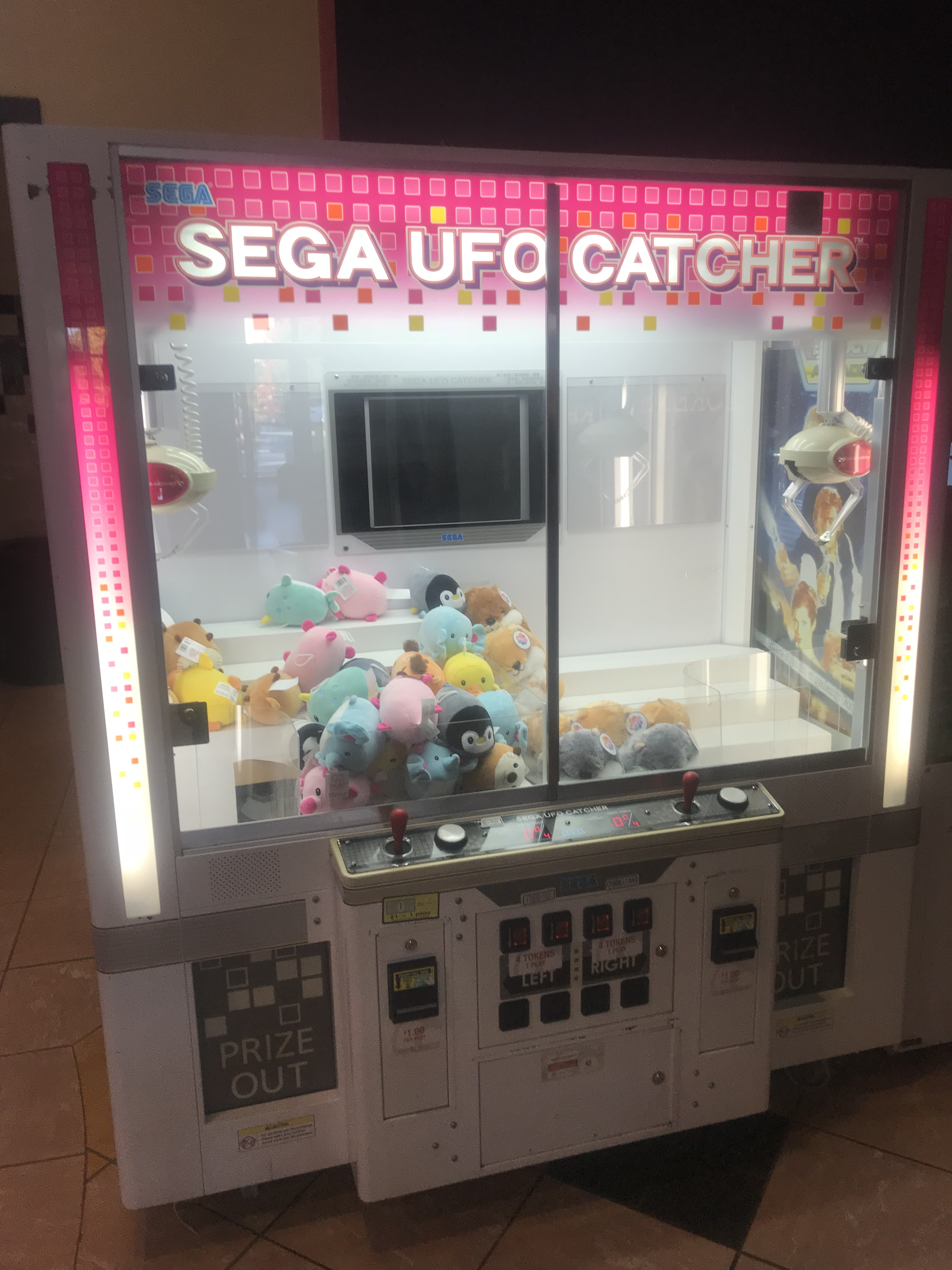
The UFO Catcher became synonymous with the claw crane game in Japan.

Sega at that time was owned by a foreign company and led by David Rosen. Rosen brought Pong from Atari to the Japanese offices, which impressed Sato. The developers quickly researched how games with TV's were made, and thus Sega quickly brought its first video game to market with Pong Tron in 1973. Hayao Nakayama, who later became president, joined Sega after the purchase of game distribution company Esco Trading. According to Sato, Nakayama was more than just a manager, he had helpful input into games like Monaco GP as well, as he firmly understood the business of games and that the development division is the most important part of a company.

Sega learned a lot about programming and software after purchasing Gremlin Industries in 1978, which was located in San Diego. It was because of this purchase that Sega began using printed circuit boards for games. Sega's first arcade board was the System 1, which debuted with Star Jacker. It was developed by Sato and was their first standardized arcade board; before then, each game had individually customized hardware. Sato remained in charge of all hardware aspects of Sega.

Home computers became an interest of Nakayama, as the MSX was becoming popular. Consequently, a small team of three people were involved in creating the SC-3000. The game capabilities of it were turned into the SG-1000, the first home console of Sega, which was made after Sega learned about Nintendo's plans to release the Famicom. At the same time the System 2 arcade hardware was developed, this time by hardware engineer Hiroshi Yagi. Yagi had first worked at Sega during the 1970s on early solid state-based pinball, but briefly left to work at Honda, before returning with the full approval of Sato. The new console Sega Mark III, called Sega Master System overseas, was made with the purpose that System 1 and 2 arcade games could easily be ported. It was thought that spreading home hardware while also developing more powerful arcade hardware would make players go to an actual arcade, and that this would create a virtuous cycle.

System 2 was also able to display multiple screens, a capability which was used in a horse racing medal game called Super Derby. This was useful for the development of the Sega Game Gear, which released in 1990. Since 1985, the Motorola 68000 was used in arcades, and it was modified to suit home consoles, which resulted in the Mega Drive in 1988, called Sega Genesis in North America when it released a year later. According to Sato this was when Sega began sharing the know-how between arcade and home hardware. Sega also increased the amount of female customers in arcades with the UFO Catcher, an improved type of crane game that existed before, and acquiring the Tetris license for arcades.

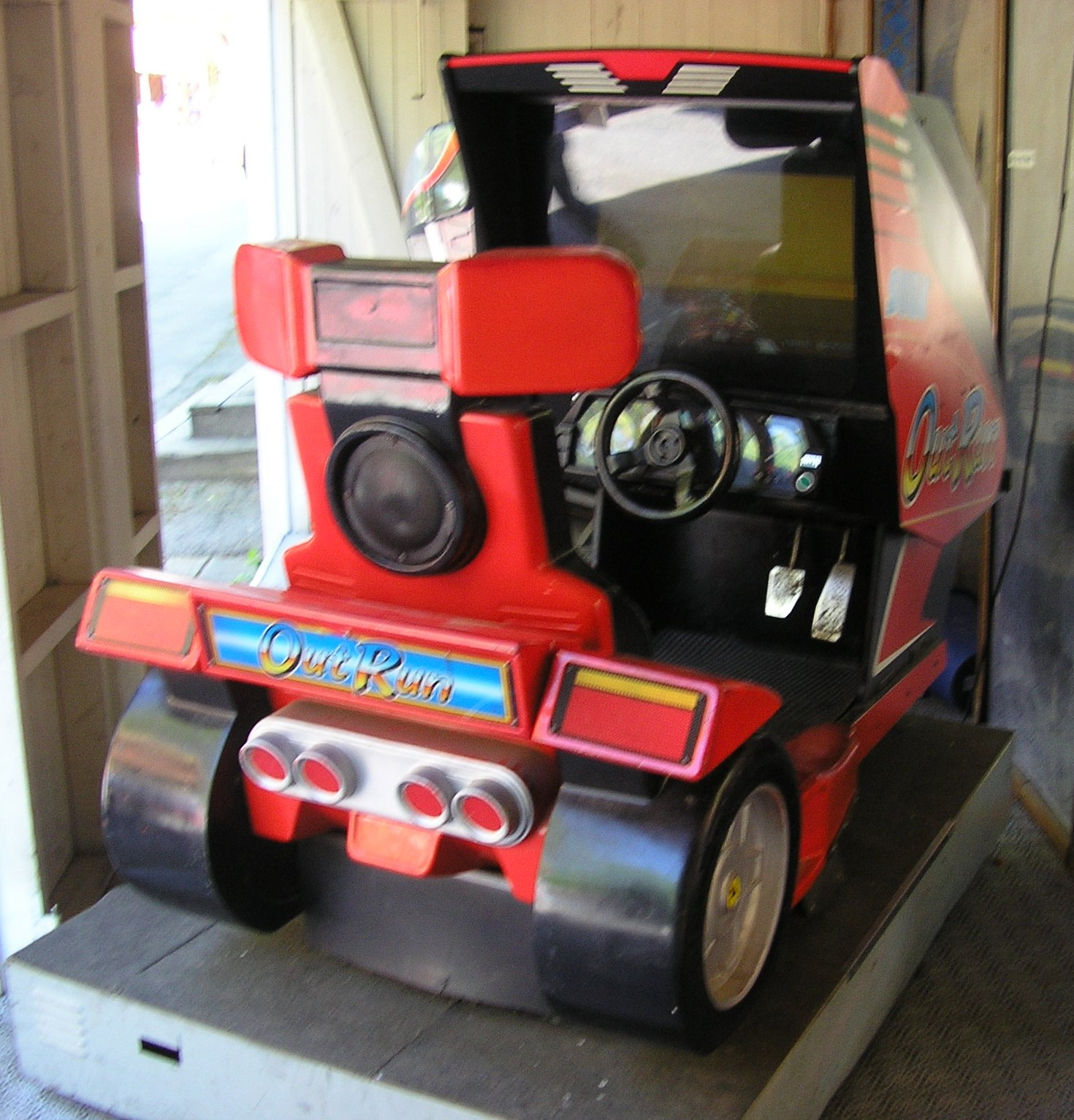
OutRun sit down cabinet

In terms of software developers, Yoji Ishii joined 1978, and was involved in sound engineering on various titles like Monaco GP and Zaxxon, before being involved in the planning section working on early arcade titles like Up'n Down, Sindbad Mystery, Flicky, Teddy Boy Blues and Fantasy Zone. He also worked with Yu Suzuki on his titles later on, and then moved on to management duties. Yu Suzuki joined in 1983, and after a year of doing chores and developing Champion Boxing, he was developing big sensory cabinet games like Hang-On, Space Harrier, OutRun and After Burner. Each took about six months. According to Hisashi Suzuki, it was the environment of being able to do everything in-house that made these kind of cabinets possible.

Yuji Naka joined the company alongside Hiroshi Kawaguchi, and was part of the team that developed software for the SC-3000, the PC Division, which according to Naka had about fifteen developers. Only some games were outsourced to Compile, all the software was done in-house. Software developers were only around 50 people at most, 20 or 30 for hardware-related matters. The pace of software development was to develop one game every one to two months, Yuji Naka recalls bragging with Yu Suzuki who worked more overtime, and it was usual to work at weekends too, as they were essentially living at the company. Mark Cerny, the only foreigner in development, recalls the company was very much a sweatshop, saying "It's one programmer, one artist, three months. That's a game. The Tokyo group made about 40 games, from which about only two could be played and enjoyed". Hideki Sato said much of the same, saying that the company was lagging behind the arcade experience of the company. Rieko Kodama, developer of Phantasy Star, recalls only one development team existing divided into software, planning and art. The artists would handle packaging, advertisements and arcade cabinet design all by themselves. According to The Revenge of Shinobi developer, Noriyoshi Ohba, by the time he joined in 1987, there were already two teams: one for arcade games, and one for console games.

Naka already had a reputation as a great programmer early on. He desired to make games that were not possible on Nintendo hardware, or to port arcade games from more powerful hardware. Examples of this include the 3D Dungeons of Phantasy Star, the Mark III version of Hokuto no Ken (overseas known as Black Belt) or ports of the arcade games Space Harrier, Super Thunder Blade and the Capcom game Ghouls 'n Ghosts. However it was the development plan of making "a game to beat Mario" that caught the attention of a superior of Naka, which started the development of Sonic the Hedgehog. The Genesis generally marked a turning point were more original software for consoles began development such as Alex Kidd in the Enchanted Castle, The Revenge of Shinobi, Phantasy Star II and Sword of Vermillion.

=== Early development ===
Department	Headed By	Notable Titles/Products	Ref.
Production & Engineering	David Rosen	Jet Rocket; Killer Shark; Periscope	
PC Division	Unknown	Champion Boxing; Girl's Garden; SC-3000	

=== 1983–1990 ===
Department	Division	Headed By	Notable Titles/Products	Ref.
R&D1	R&D, Sega Enterprises	Hisashi Suzuki, Yoji Ishii	Altered Beast; Fantasy Zone; Golden Axe	
R&D2	R&D, Sega Enterprises	Mamoru Shigeta, Minoru Kanari	Alex Kidd series; Dragon Crystal; Phantasy Star series	
R&D3	R&D, Sega Enterprises	Hideki Sato	SG-1000; Sega Mark III; Sega Genesis	
R&D4	R&D, Sega Enterprises	Unknown	Aero City; Sega Super Curcuit; UFO Catcher	
R&D5	R&D, Sega Enterprises	Unknown	Sega System series; Super Scaler	
R&D6	R&D, Sega Enterprises	Unknown	Castle of Illusion Starring Mickey Mouse; Sega AI Computer; The Revenge of Shinobi	
R&D7	R&D, Sega Enterprises	Unknown	Robo Pitcher	
R&D8	R&D, Sega Enterprises	Yu Suzuki	Hang-On; Space Harrier; Out Run	
R&D9	R&D, Sega Enterprises	Unknown	Fatal Labyrinth; Shadow Dancer	

== 1991–1999 ==
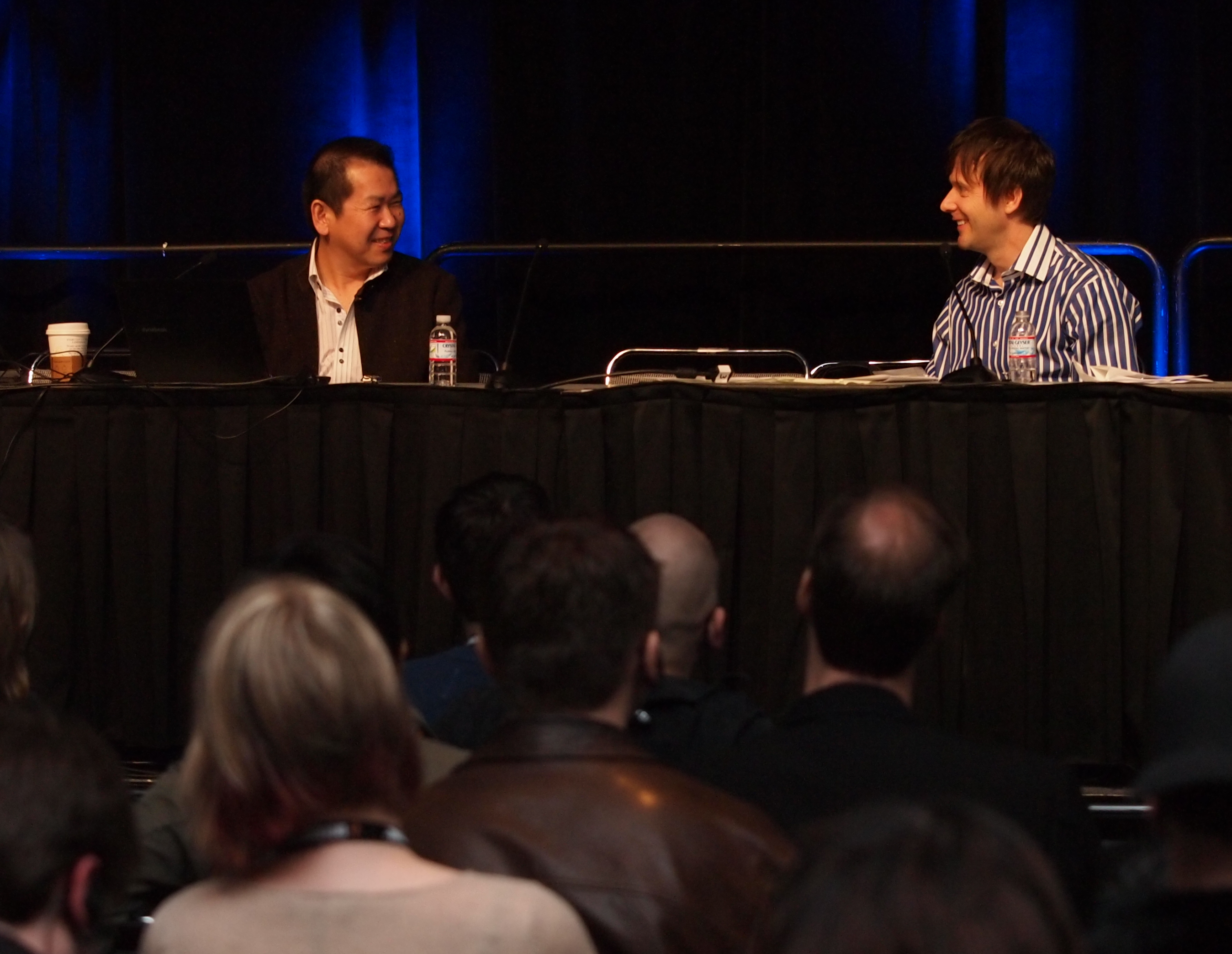
Yu Suzuki and Mark Cerny have both previously worked at Sega.

Yu Suzuki was the first to branch out, with his own studio called Studio 128. After that, many more departments followed, all of which had their roots in R&D1. Hisao Oguchi recalls up to six departments; according to him the environment was extremely competitive. Hisashi Suzuki often asked "what's new?" and had a desire of the development teams to be "first in the world" when looking at their game pitches. Hayao Nakayama had harsh opinions on the developers that didn't make money in the arcades, and thus supported developers like Yu Suzuki, who created many hits. Nakayama gave an order to develop a title better than Street Fighter II by Capcom. Namco had also paced ahead in the arcade industry with Winning Run. To catch up, Sega was motivated to move ahead in 3D graphics, and while most developers were still rooted in sprite graphics, Yu Suzuki was the only willing developer to go forward in this direction. He purchased SGI IRIS workstations from Silicon Valley to develop Virtua Racing, which in turn led to Virtua Fighter, and both satisfied Nakayama's expectations. In collaboration with GE, the Sega Model 2 and Sega Model 3 arcade hardware was made possible, and produced further games with very advanced graphics such as Daytona USA, building on newer AM2 hire Toshihiro Nagoshi's previous experience directing Virtua Racing. Multiplayer action and sports titles were also made possible with Virtua Striker, Virtua Cop and SpikeOut.

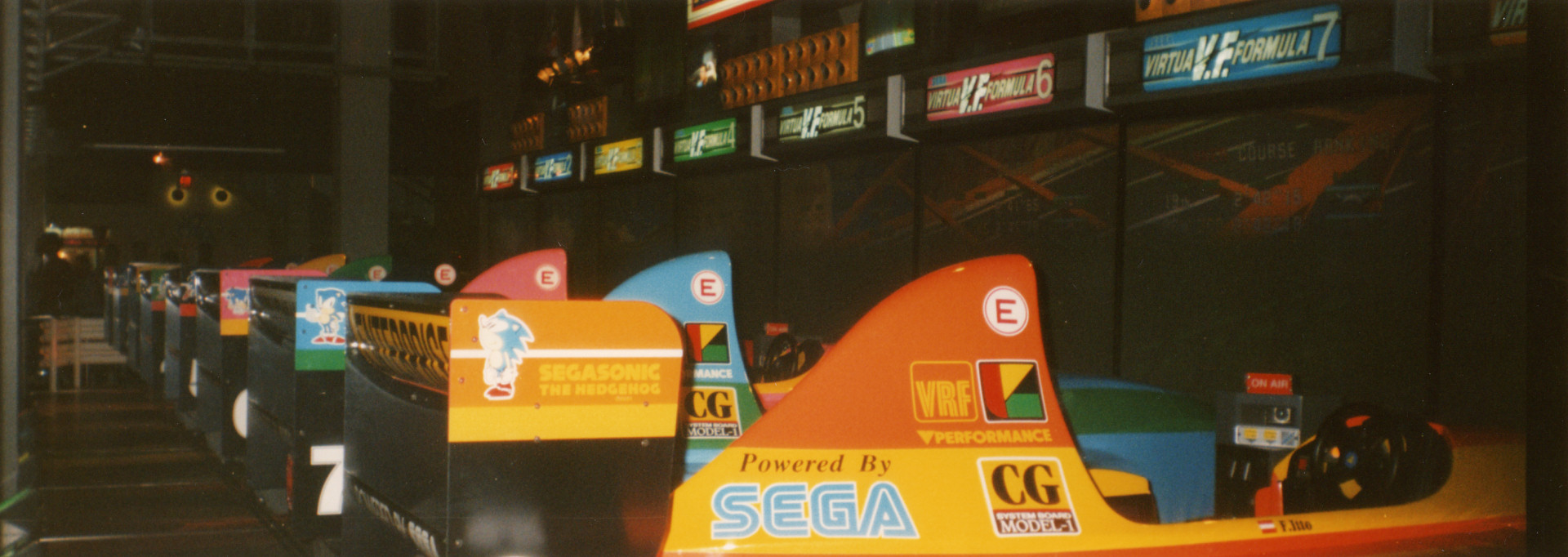
8 player Virtua Racing set-up at Sega VirtuaLand, Luxor, Las Vegas

On the opposite trend, Hisao Oguchi of AM3, which broke away from AM1 following AM2's success, was aiming to make games for couples, as well as aiming for a "cool" rather than otaku-like feel. AM3 developer Mie Kumagai, who later garnered attention later on as a female manager of a development department, shared this sentiment, believing "the future of arcades cannot be boys only". Rail Chase, Jurassic Park, Jambo! Safari, Top Skater and DecAthlete, were part of this direction. However, most of the income at arcades in Japan still came from core players rather than casuals, with AM3 scoring one of its biggest hits in the form of Virtual On: Cyber Troopers. AM3 also succeeded by establishing Tetsuya Mizuguchi and Kenji Sasaki in game development at Sega on the acclaimed Sega Rally Championship; they had both previously made ride films for Sega's large AS-1 motion simulator, and broke off into their very own unit, AM Annex, following the popularity of Rally (a benefit similarly given to Nagoshi for SpikeOut). After their success with UFO Catcher prize games and Tetris, Sega's next hit in the arcade market with women ultimately came in the Print Club photo booths, co-developed by the arcade cabinet team AM4 with Atlus. This established purikura in Japan.

Sega's arcade hardware development side additionally grew, with teams splitting off from the existing AM4 department in a similar way to AM2 and AM3. These included AM5, whose personnel at first originated a line of kiddie rides with monitors, but went on to instead make large scale attractions for Sega's attempts at the theme park business with Joypolis, SegaWorld London and Sega World Sydney, led by Nakayama in another effort to compete with Namco, as well as Disney. Building off of the motion base of the AS-1 simulator, their attractions included the VR-1, an early example of Virtual Reality made with support from AM4, 3, and Virtuality. Masao Yoshimoto, who joined in 1987, and developed the R360 among many other arcade cabinets, recalled this period as the golden age of Sega, when both advanced graphics and big motion sensitive simulators such as the ones for Manx TT Superbike and WaveRunner were made possible.

Putting to use what Naka learned by porting Ghouls 'n Ghosts to the Genesis, he went on to develop Sonic the Hedgehog, along with artist Naoto Ohshima and designer Hirokazu Yasuhara. Sonic had a much bigger development period than other Sega games at the time, with Mark Cerny recalling it having ten months development time, and three core developers instead of two. Naka himself worked on it for one year and a half, and did not work on any other games in the meantime, in contrast to the frequent releases he had before. Marketing strategies by the subsidiary Sega of America which was headed by Tom Kalinske, made Sonic the Hedgehog a success for Sega, causing them to have 61% market share in North America with their Genesis consoles. Naka quit Sega due to him feeling that he did not get enough appreciation for his work on Sonic, but then was invited by Mark Cerny to join his development group, the Sega Technical Institute, and he along with ten other developers went to Sega of America and developed the sequels Sonic 2, Sonic 3 and Sonic & Knuckles. In addition to STI, Sega Interactive, Sega Midwest Studio and Sega Multimedia Studio were other studios that Sega of America established at this time, though their game development never progressed to the same capacity as Japan.

As part of a concerted effort by Hayao Nakayama to supply the Mega Drive with more quality software funded by Sega, Japanese game development also expanded externally with second party studios such as SIMS, which was previously Sanritsu, Treasure, which consisted of ex-Konami developers and debuted with the highly praised Gunstar Heroes, and Sonic Software Planning!, which often worked with Climax Entertainment. Other worldwide successes developed by the inhouse Japanese development group were Streets of Rage II and Phantasy Star IV which were appreciated in all parts of the world.

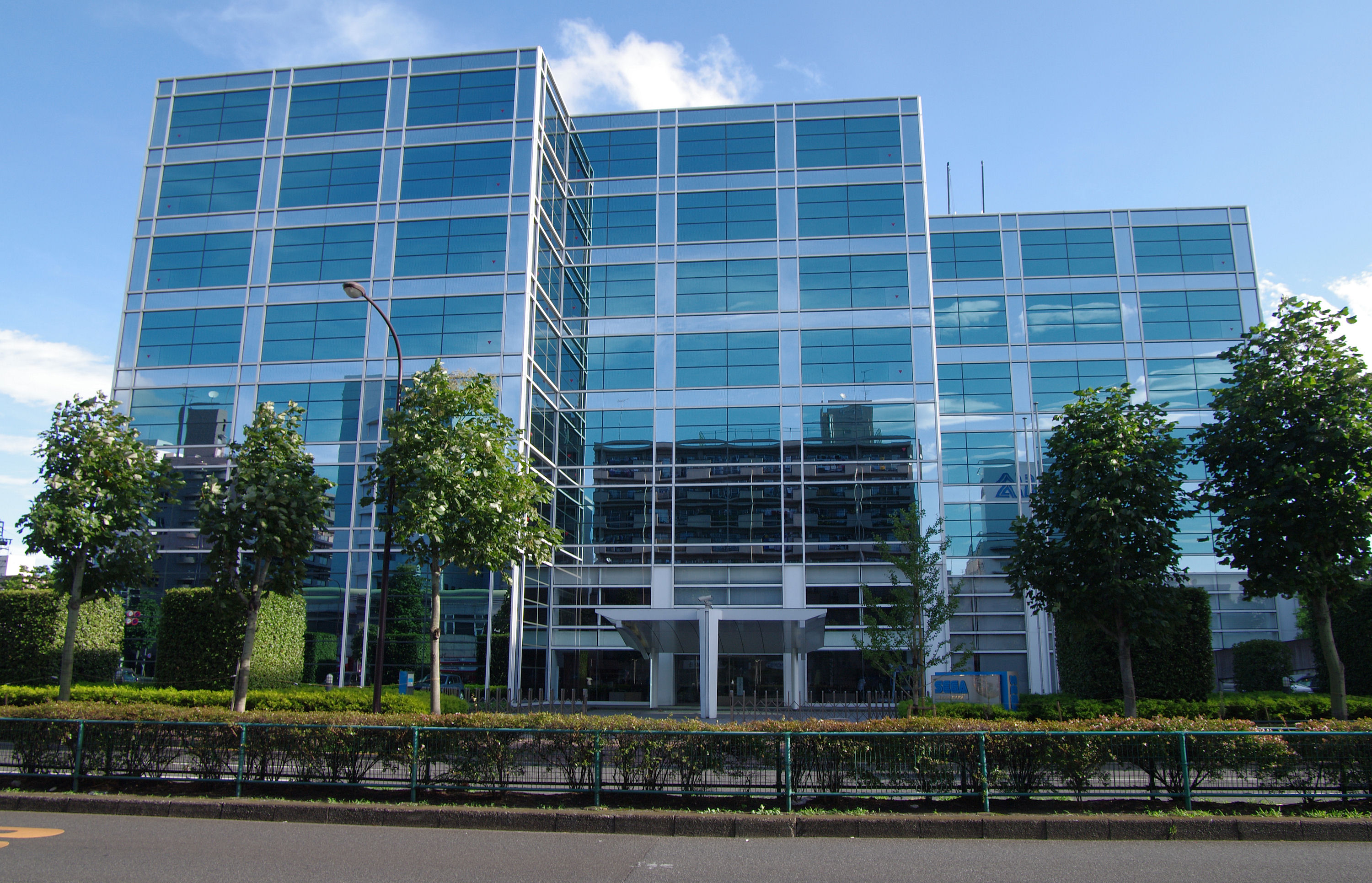
The new headquarters was completed in 1994.

The Mega CD was developed to get ahead in Japan, as the PC Engine was more popular and also had a CD drive. According to hardware developer Masami Ishikawa, Sega was able to increase performance and storage capacity, and thus became able to release better RPGs on it. The most famous title for the Mega CD was Sonic CD, developed in Japan without the involvement of Yuji Naka, although ideas were exchanged. CD was mainly developed by Naoto Ohshima, alongside staff gathered from all over Sega, many of them young. RPGs remained the most popular on consoles in Japan, and Game Arts' works were an important asset for Sega; however, those games as well as Sega's own Shining and Phantasy Star series were unable to truly compete with Dragon Quest, Final Fantasy and Ys I&II. This later led to their use of Virtua Fighter to create an RPG, since it was Sega's most popular IP in Japan, with the project eventually becoming Shenmue.

Being behind on console in Japan motivated Sega to put resources into the Sega Saturn. The development team of the Saturn was the same that developed the System 32 arcade board. Sato regrets that he did not go with the Model 1 arcade hardware as a base, as he was too concerned of leaving all the developers behind that were focused on sprites rather than 3D, which were still the majority of developers outside of AM2. At one time Sega were supporting five different console hardwares, with the first and second CS departments focusing on Sega Saturn, the third and fourth on the Mega Drive as well as 32X and Mega CD. A fifth development department existed for Game Gear development and a sixth department existed for RPG's. Another department of about 40 people dedicated to porting games to PC was also established, as Windows 95 became widespread in Japan. Including overseas staff and arcade developers, over 1000 developers were engaged in development at Sega.

Sega Saturn projects were much larger in comparison to other teams at the time, scaling up from the five or ten people involved in Master System or Genesis games. An early large project was Panzer Dragoon, for which 30 people were involved. Yoji Ishii was transferred from arcade to console development by Nakayama in 1993, and many others from the arcades followed, making it up to several hundred developers involved in Sega Saturn software development. AM2 created a development environment for the Saturn, called the Sega Graphic Library, due to the console being difficult to make games for out of the box. Early on, the 3D capabilities were not shown off well with a lacking port of Daytona USA as well as Clockwork Knight, which was mainly 2D. By 1995, the Saturn could compete very well with PlayStation in Japan with ports of Virtua Fighter 2, Virtua Cop and Sega Rally Championship. Particularly Virtua Fighter 2 became the first million-seller for Sega in Japan. RPG's like Sakura Wars, Magic Knight Rayearth and Dragon Force, anime license games such as Neon Genesis Evangelion and sports games also did very well in Japan. Yuji Naka returned to Japan and wanted to develop 3D games, after being sent videotapes of the games that Yu Suzuki was developing. Naka had no desire to develop for the Sega 32X, which was mainly spearheaded by Sega of America.

Game producer Takayuki Kawagoe called the line-up for the 32X quite weak, as games like Knuckles Chaotix were previously just 16-bit titles, but praised the original titles such as Metal Head. Naka, along with Naoto Ohshima developed NiGHTS Into Dreams and Burning Rangers, with the latter not having as much involvement from Naka. Much like how Sonic was made to succeed in America, NiGHTS was made to succeed in Europe, although that was the desire by the development team, rather than marketing. According to manager Hisashi Suzuki, the turning point was the release of Final Fantasy VII. It and the influence of Dragon Quest was far too great for Sega to overcome. It did not only influence the fortune of Sega in console development, but also the relevancy of arcades was put into question as well, with Fighters Megamix only being made for Saturn against a tight Christmas 1996 deadline to capitalize on a delay in its development. To combat Final Fantasy VII, Team Andromeda, the team behind Panzer Dragoon was instructed to develop an RPG, which was Panzer Dragoon Saga.

The hardware team developed peripherals which resembled the Wii Remote by Nintendo and modern virtual reality headsets, however they never made it to market. The controller that resembled the Wii Remote had a gun pointer and a gyro sensor and was suggested by Yuji Naka for the Dreamcast, but was not supported by Sega as a whole. Prototypes of virtual reality headsets were made by Sega of America, Sega of Japan as well as the arcade division.

At the time, Sega was involved with Vivendi and Universal on GameWorks, and thus had a connection to Steven Spielberg, who visited the Sega offices and saw the prototype of Shenmue, which was something that he was very impressed with. This caused Sega management to further support it. However, according to Hisashi Suzuki this meant Yu Suzuki leaving the arcade business to develop console projects, and no one was able to tame Yu Suzuki, which meant that the project went out of control. Shenmue went over budget and was rumored to have cost Sega over $50 million.

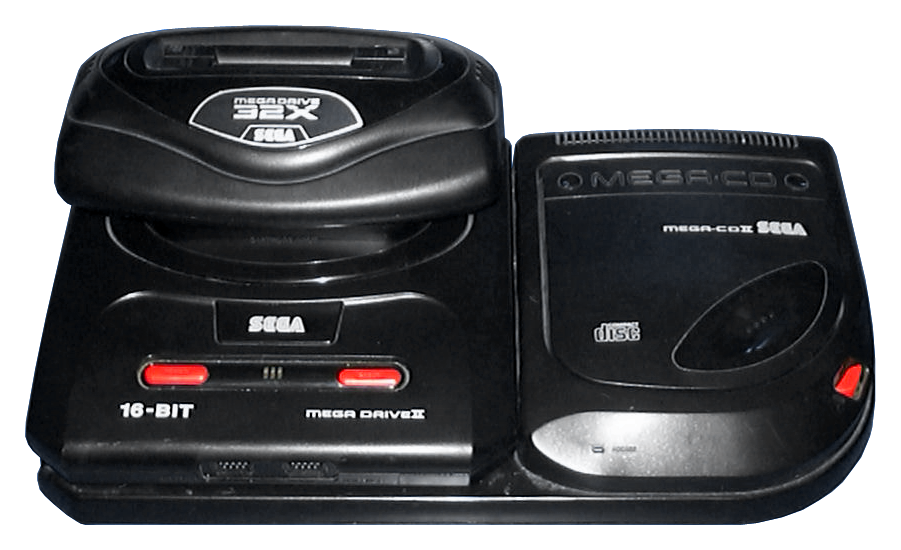
Sega Genesis with all add-ons attached

Isao Okawa, the chairman of CSK, which was the parent company of Sega, said "let's try one more time", in regard to Sega hardware. Sonic Adventure, Virtua Fighter 3, an early version of Skies of Arcadia and Shenmue moved from Saturn to the new Dreamcast and in-house development for Sega Saturn completely halted in 1998. The NAOMI arcade hardware was developed to make porting titles to the Dreamcast without loss of quality. Therefore, home and arcade hardware became equal. Isao Okawa personally instructed Yuji Naka, to create an online game for the new Dreamcast. Experiments with online functionality goes back to the Mega Modem of the Genesis. Naka released Chu Chu Rocket as a test for the online capabilities for the Dreamcast. The turnover of staff was the largest at Sega since 1986, as staff began to establish new companies such as Artoon. Visual Concepts was acquired by Sega of America to develop sports titles, while No Cliche was established by Sega Europe.

=== 1991–1995 ===
Department	Division	Members From	Headed by (Note: As of 2000)	Notable Titles/Products	Ref.
AM1	Amusement R&D, Sega Enterprises	Sega R&D1	Rikiya Nakagawa	Golden Axe: The Revenge of Death Adder; OutRunners; Puzzle & Action: Ichidant-R	
AM2	Amusement R&D, Sega Enterprises	Studio 128	Yu Suzuki	Virtua Cop series; Virtua Fighter series; Daytona USA	
AM3	Amusement R&D, Sega Enterprises	Sega R&D1	Hisao Oguchi	Manx TT Superbike; Sega Rally Championship; SegaSonic The Hedgehog	
AM4	Amusement R&D, Sega Enterprises	Sega R&D4, Sega R&D5	Masao Yoshimoto	Astro City; Print Club series; UFO Catcher series	
AM5	Amusement R&D, Sega Enterprises	Sega R&D4, Sega R&D5	Tokinori Kaneyasu	AS-1; VR-1; Rail Chase: The Ride	
AM6	Amusement R&D, Sega Enterprises	Sega R&D4, Sega R&D5	Tomoji Miyamoto	Medal games	
AM7	Amusement R&D, Sega Enterprises	Sega R&D4, Sega R&D5	Unknown	Hardware	
CS1 (includes Team Andromeda)	Consumer R&D, Sega Enterprises	Sega R&D2, Sega R&D6	Makoto Oshitani, Yoji Ishii	Clockwork Knight series; Panzer Dragoon; Golden Axe series	
CS2	Consumer R&D, Sega Enterprises	Sega R&D2, Sega R&D6	Hiroshi Aso, Makoto Oshitani	Astal; Dark Wizard; Quackshot	
CS3	Consumer R&D, Sega Enterprises	Sega R&D2, Sega R&D6	Hiroshi Aso, Makoto Oshitani	Shinobi III: Return of the Ninja Master; Streets of Rage series; Sonic the Hedgehog series	
CS4	Consumer R&D, Sega Enterprises	Sega R&D2, Sega R&D6	Koichi Nagata	Metal Head; Virtua Racing; Virtua Fighter	
CS5	Consumer R&D, Sega Enterprises	Sega R&D2, Sega R&D6	Motoshige Hokoyama	Coca Cola Kid; Sylvan Tale; Sonic Drift 2	
RPG Production	Consumer R&D, Sega Enterprises	Sega R&D2, Sega R&D6	Tomio Takami	Blue Seed; Magic Knight Rayearth; Phantasy Star IV	
Sega Technical Institute (Japanese Team)	Sega of America	Sega R&D2, Sega R&D6	Yuji Naka	Sonic the Hedgehog series	

=== 1996–1999 ===
Department	Division	Members From	Headed By	Notable Titles/Products	Ref.
AM1	Amusement R&D, Sega Enterprises	Same	Rikiya Nakagawa	Harley Davidson & L.A. Riders; Sega Bass Fishing; The House of the Dead series	
AM2	Amusement R&D, Sega Enterprises	Same	Yu Suzuki	Fighters Megamix; Virtua Fighter 3; Scud Race	
AM3	Amusement R&D, Sega Enterprises	Same	Hisao Oguchi	Decathlete; Virtual On series; The Lost World: Jurassic Park	
AM4	Amusement R&D, Sega Enterprises	Same	Masao Yoshimoto	Blast City; Print Club series; UFO Catcher series	
AM5	Amusement R&D, Sega Enterprises	Same	Tokinori Kaneyasu	Boat Race GP; Halfpipe Canyon; Sega Rally Special Stage	
AM11	Amusement R&D, Sega Enterprises	Sega AM2	Toshihiro Nagoshi	SpikeOut	
AM Annex/AM12	Amusement R&D, Sega Enterprises	Sega AM3	Tetsuya Mizuguchi	Sega Rally 2; Sega Touring Car Championship; Star Wars Trilogy Arcade	
CS1/AM6 (includes Team Andromeda)	Consumer R&D, Sega Enterprises	Sega CS1; Sega CS2; Sega CS3; Sega CS4; Sega CS5; RPG Production	Makoto Oshitani	Dragon Force; Panzer Dragoon series; Sega Worldwide Soccer series	
CS2/AM7	Consumer R&D, Sega Enterprises	Sega CS1; Sega CS2; Sega CS3; Sega CS4; Sega CS5; RPG Production	Noriyoshi Oba	Atsumare! Guru Guru Onsen; Pro Soccer Club o Tsukurou! series; Sakura Wars series	
CS3/AM8 (includes Sonic Team)	Consumer R&D, Sega Enterprises	Sega CS1; Sega CS2; Sega CS3; Sega CS4; Sega CS5; RPG Production	Yuji Naka	Burning Rangers; Nights into Dreams...; Sonic Adventure	
CS4/AM9	Consumer R&D, Sega Enterprises	Sega CS1; Sega CS2; Sega CS3; Sega CS4; Sega CS5; RPG Production	Tetsuya Mizuguchi	Space Channel 5	
Sega PC	Consumer R&D, Sega Enterprises	New	Hiroyuki Okata	Sonic & Knuckles Collection; Daytona USA: Evolution; Virtua Fighter PC	
Sega Digital Studio/AM10	Consumer R&D, Sega Enterprises	New	Yukifimi Makino	Music for Sega games	
AM1 (US Team)	Sega of America	Sega AM1	Roger Hector, Makoto Uchida	Die Hard Arcade; Dynamite Cop	

== 2000–2004 ==
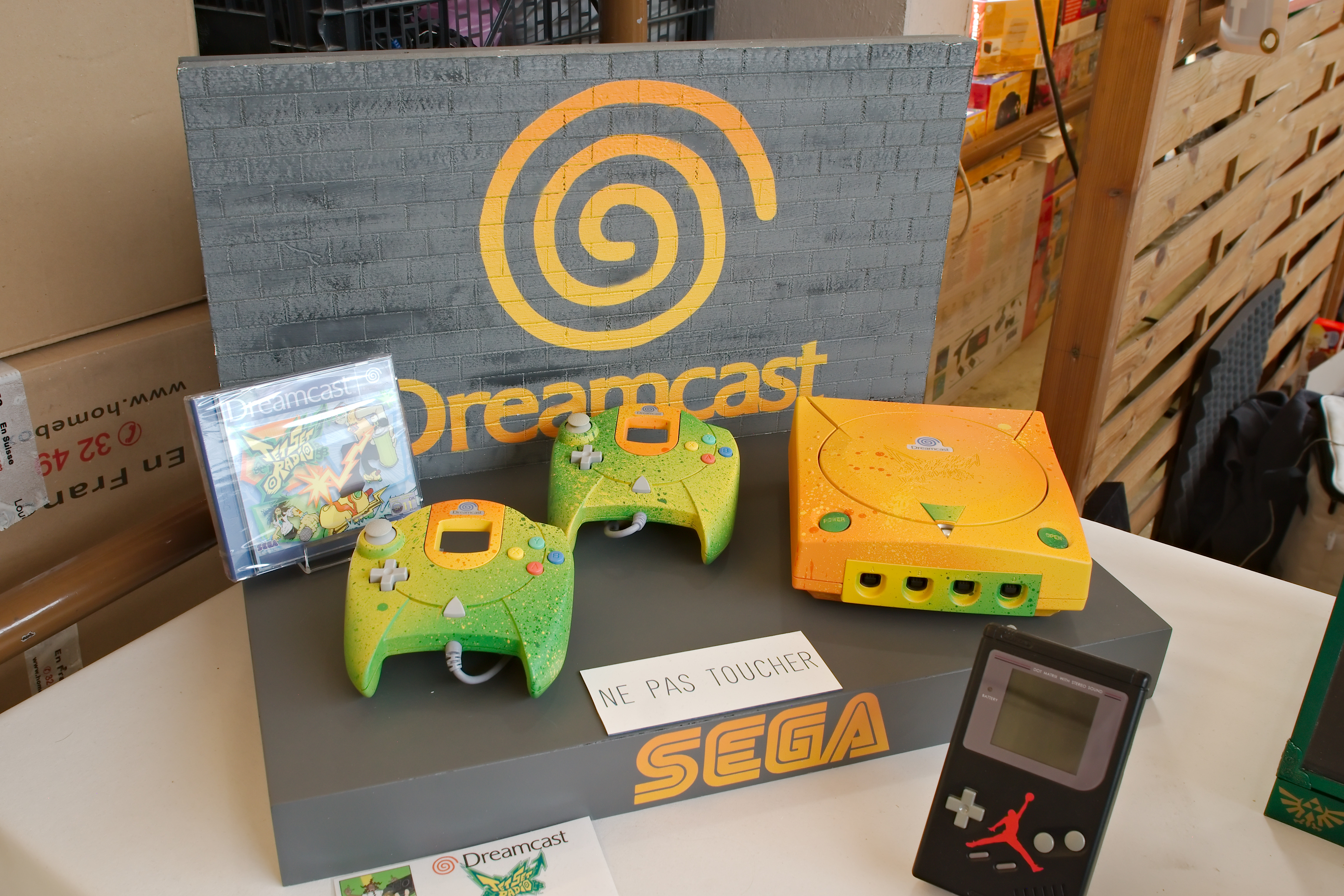
Jet Set Radio on the Dreamcast was one of the innovative titles earning praise at the time.

Sega's software development teams were split off into separate companies on April 21, 2000. Each were headed by their own president with their own philosophies, and they were responsible for their own finances. A year later, Sega officially announced their withdrawal from the console hardware market on January 31, 2001, to develop games for other hardware. All the different companies established supported different consoles after ending support for the Dreamcast, with the Xbox being supported by WOW Entertainment, Hitmaker and Smilebit, the GameCube being supported by Sonic Team and Amusement Vision and the PlayStation 2 being supported by Overworks, AM2, United Game Artists and Smilebit. Tetsuya Mizuguchi, head of United Game Artists, saw this initially as a move of Sega of being more similar to Hollywood, where distribution and development were becoming more and more separated. Toshihiro Nagoshi recalls this period as labour of love from Sega, "teaching the creatives the way of managing a business". Hisao Oguchi who lead Hitmaker, however, had a suspicion that this structure was made to ultimately separate the creators who were able to make profit and the ones who didn't, as they were many projects that didn't hit the mark, and at one point Sega was hiring hundreds of developers a year, effecting costs that were no longer manageable. Nonetheless, journalists praised the innovation of Sega's titles during this period as a "brief moment of remarkable creativity''. Dreamcast games Rez, Jet Set Radio and Shenmue are considered as some of the best games of all time.

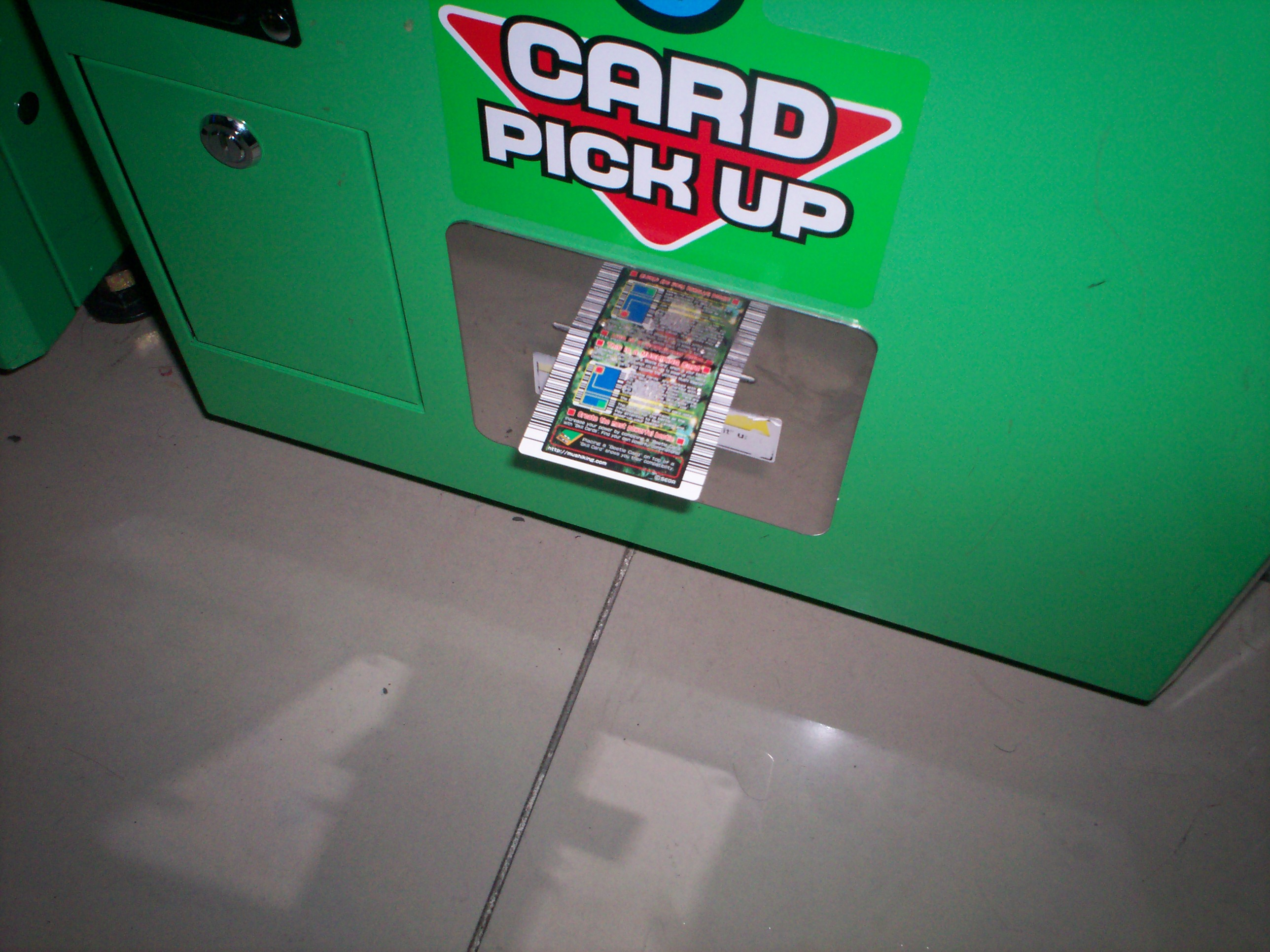
Arcade machines that dispense cards ended up being very successful for Sega.

In the end, Yuji Naka, who lead Sonic Team, was considered to be the most successful in home software development, with Oguchi at Hitmaker being the arcade counterpart. Sonic Team produced the high selling Sonic games and Phantasy Star Online, which won several awards within the Japanese game industry. Hitmaker originated the successful genre of card-based arcade games in Japan, which started with Derby Owners Club's support for game progression via IC cards, and continued with World Club Champion Football, which advanced the concept with a flat panel reader and library of cards for football players, giving it the added dimension of trading, among other titles like The Key of Avalon.

The card concept was subsequently adopted by other Sega teams for arcade games, with AM2 integrating IC card based progression into Virtua Fighter 4 alongside additional early support for internet infrastructure under Hiroshi Kataoka, whilst the Mirai R&D department (headed by former Joypolis attraction developer Hiroshi Uemura) made the child-focused trading card titles Mushiking: The King of Beetles and Love & Berry: Dress up and Dance!. Mushiking and Love & Berry particularly supported Sega with very strong sales in the Japanese market. Experiments with using cards to take with you, go back to the Sega Card format that was developed in the 80's, but ended up being used as a cartridge format for home consoles only.

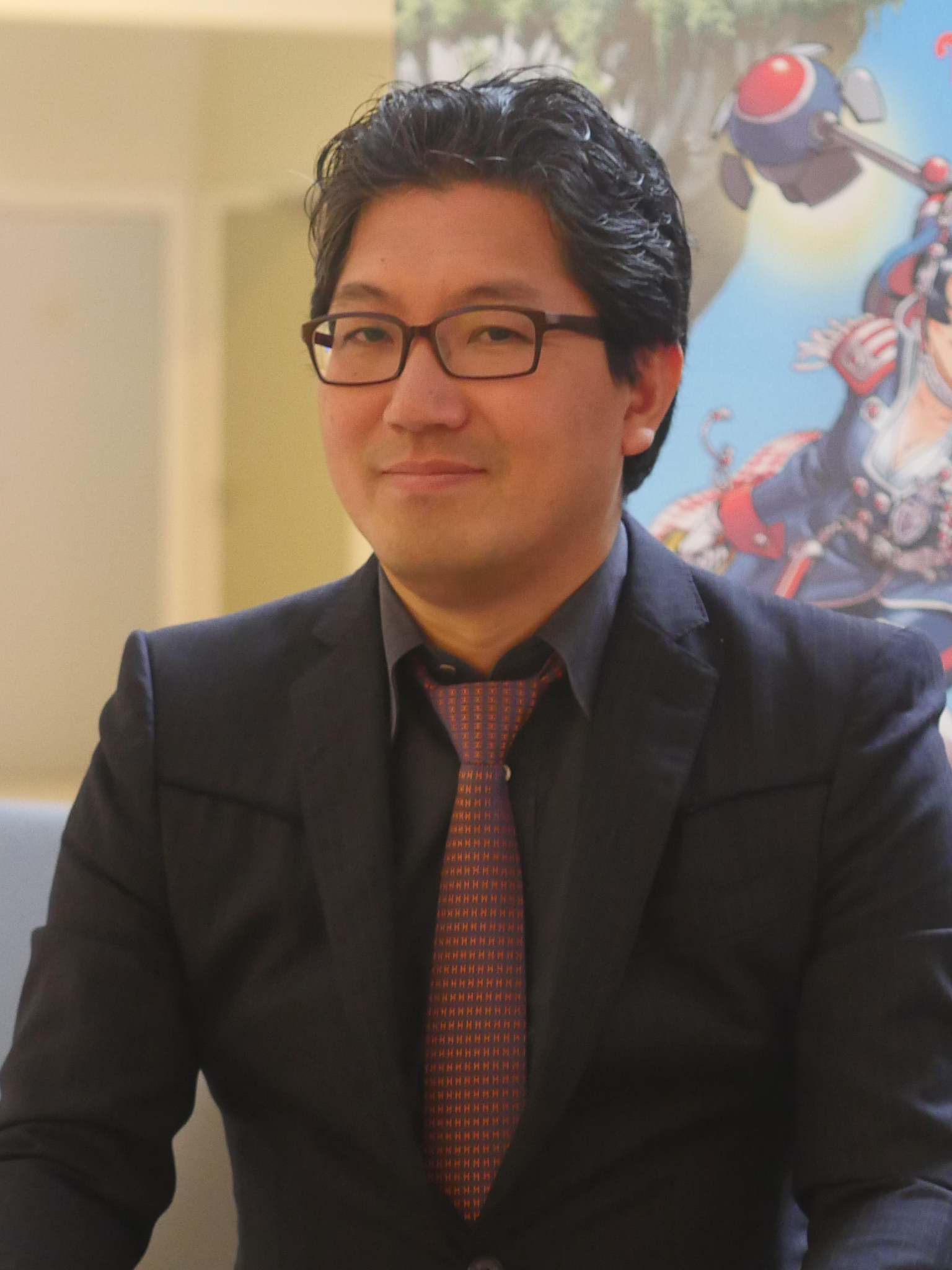
Yuji Naka oversaw Sega & Sonic Team game development until his departure in 2006.

Amusement Vision, led by Toshihiro Nagoshi, was not very involved with Dreamcast games, however landed a hit with Super Monkey Ball on the Nintendo GameCube and was involved with Nintendo management when dealing with them for the development of F-Zero GX. Nagoshi observed Nintendo management from the bottom all the way to the top, and was very surprised with how uniform the opinions at the company were, saying "no wonder we lost!". This activity also made him very favourable for a management position within Sega. However, Nagoshi saw himself as sort of an in-between of Oguchi and Naka, and not on the same level as them.

Sega did not make any further custom hardware on its own after the Sega Hikaru arcade board, however many tenured engineers continued to work on Sega arcade technologies such as its card systems, internet infrastructure and future arcade boards such as the Xbox-based Chihiro. Many hardware developers also joined pachinko and pachislot company Sammy Corporation, who soon merged with Sega. Hideki Sato pushed for leftover Dreamcast parts being used as displays in the machines that Sammy develops, including the very successful Fist of the North Star pachinko machines.

In 2003, Oguchi became president of Sega, and multiple studios were merged into another, as several developers left Sega during the era of spinning off their development studios. These included Rikiya Nakagawa from WOW Entertainment (which took on Overworks) and Mizuguchi from United Game Artists (which merged into Sonic Team). Though responsible for the successful Initial D: Arcade Stage, Sega Rally director Kenji Sasaki's studio Sega Rosso was also merged, returning to AM3 successor Hitmaker; Sasaki left Sega by 2005 to form his own independent studio Bitster, and went on to collaborate with Sega again in subsequent decades. Yu Suzuki departed AM2 to form his own studio, Digital Rex, but within Sega. The development studios merged back into Sega on July 1, 2004.

Visual Concepts was sold to Take Two Interactive in 2005.

=== 2000–2002 ===
Studio	Division	Members From	Headed By	Notable Titles	Ref.
WOW Entertainment Inc.	R&D Holdings, Sega Corporation	Sega AM1 R&D	Rikiya Nakagawa	Sega GT series; Sports Jam; The House of the Dead III	
Sega AM2 Co., Ltd./AM2 of CRI	R&D Holdings, Sega Corporation	Same as before	Yu Suzuki	Shenmue series; Sega Network Taisen Mahjong MJ series; Virtua Fighter 4	
Hitmaker Co., Ltd.	R&D Holdings, Sega Corporation	Sega AM3 R&D	Hisao Oguchi	Crazy Taxi series; Virtua Tennis series; World Club Champion Football series	
Amusement Vision Ltd.	R&D Holdings, Sega Corporation	Sega AM11 R&D	Toshihiro Nagoshi	Daytona USA 2001; Super Monkey Ball series; Virtua Striker series	
Sega Rosso Co., Ltd.	R&D Holdings, Sega Corporation	Sega AM12 R&D	Kenji Sasaki	Cosmic Smash; Initial D Arcade Stage series; Star Wars Racer Arcade	
Smilebit Corporation	R&D Holdings, Sega Corporation	Sega PC	Shun Arai	Pro Soccer Club o Tsukurou!; Jet Set Radio series; Panzer Dragoon Orta	
Overworks Ltd.	R&D Holdings, Sega Corporation	CS2	Noriyoshi Oba	Skies of Arcadia; Shinobi; Sakura Wars series	
Sonic Team Ltd.	R&D Holdings, Sega Corporation	Same as before	Yuji Naka	Phantasy Star Online; Samba de Amigo; Sonic the Hedgehog series	
United Game Artists Co., Ltd.	R&D Holdings, Sega Corporation	New	Tetsuya Mizuguchi	Rez; Space Channel 5 series	
Wave Master Inc.	R&D Holdings, Sega Corporation	New	Yukifimi Makino	Roommania #203	
Sega Mechatro	R&D Holdings, Sega Corporation	AM4 + AM6	Tomoji Miyamoto	Club Kart: European Session; Starhorse series; UFO Catcher series	
Mirai R&D	R&D Holdings, Sega Corporation	AM5	Hiroshi Uemura	McDonalds no Touch de Asobo!; Speed Boarder; Viva! Skydiving	
Sonic Team USA	Sega of America	Sonic Team Ltd.	Takashi Iizuka	Sonic Adventure 2	
WOW Entertainment (US Team)	Sega of America	AM1, WOW Entertainment Inc.	Makoto Uchida	Alien Front	

=== 2003–2004 ===
Department	Division	Members From	Headed By	Notable Titles	Ref.
Sega WOW Inc.	R&D, Sega Corporation	WOW Entertainment Inc. + Overworks Ltd.	Rikiya Nakagawa	Dragon Treasure; Nightshade; Sakura Wars series	
Sega AM2 Co., Ltd.	R&D, Sega Corporation	Same as before	Hiroshi Kataoka	Quest of D series; OutRun 2; Virtua Cop 3	
Digital Rex Co., Ltd.	R&D, Sega Corporation	Sega AM2 Co., Ltd.	Yu Suzuki		
Hitmaker Co., Ltd.	R&D, Sega Corporation	Hitmaker Co., Ltd. + Sega Rosso Co., Ltd.	Mie Kumagai	Avalon no Kagi series; Initial D Arcade Stage series; World Club Champion Football series	
Amusement Vision Ltd.	R&D, Sega Corporation	Amusement Vision Ltd. + Smilebit Corporation	Toshihiro Nagoshi	F-Zero GX; Super Monkey Ball series; Ollie King	
Smilebit Corporation	R&D, Sega Corporation	Amusement Vision Ltd. + Smilebit Corporation	Takayuki Kawagoe	Pro Soccer Club o Tsukurou!; Virtua Striker 4	
Sonic Team Ltd.	R&D, Sega Corporation	Sonic Team Ltd. + United Game Artists Co., Ltd.	Yuji Naka	Billy Hatcher and the Giant Egg; Feel the Magic: XY/XX; Sonic the Hedgehog series	
Wave Master Inc.	R&D, Sega Corporation	Same	Yukifimi Makino	New Roommania: Porori Seishun	
Sega Mechatro	R&D, Sega Corporation	Same	Masao Yoshimoto	Medal games; Starhorse series; UFO Catcher series	
Mirai R&D	R&D, Sega Corporation	Same	Hiroshi Uemura	Mushiking series; Love and Berry series	
Sonic Team USA	Sega of America	Same	Takashi Iizuka	Sonic Heroes	

== 2005–2008 ==
In 2005 a new structure of game development was announced, after Sega became a subsidiary of Sega Sammy Holdings, and was under new management, with Hajime Satomi from Sammy Corporation at the top. The Consumer Business Group Division contained the Global Entertainment R&D and New Entertainment R&D departments, which all together were divided into six departments, each focusing on something different, such as network, sports, cinematic and character based games. Particularly the Yakuza / Like a Dragon games by the New Entertainment department already became a franchise for Sega in 2006, and they were motivated to develop it into a character brand similarly to Sonic the Hedgehog, Mushiking and Love & Berry. According to the now former manager Hisashi Suzuki, the Like a Dragon series was only possible due to the experience of Shenmue, and it also inherited elements of the SpikeOut arcade games. Next generation console development with PlayStation 3 exclusives Ryū ga Gotoku Kenzan! by NE and Valkyria Chronicles by GE2, and the multi-platform Sonic the Hedgehog 2006 by Sonic Team, also became a focus. Later, developer Takashi Iizuka admitted that Sonic Team had prioritized shipping games over quality during this period, resulting into several poorly received games in the Sonic the Hedgehog series. Sega also showcased the Lindbergh arcade board along with Virtua Fighter 5 and Virtua Tennis 3, both of which were ported to PlayStation 3 soon after.

Sega Europe president Mike Hayes said that Japanese origin IP became less popular around 2004, with Sega of America president Simon Jeffery showing a similar sentiment. Specifically there was motivation to be seen less like just like another Japanese company by Sega of America, with them being more picky what to bring over from the Japanese studios since 2005. This was a conscious decision on Japanese management.

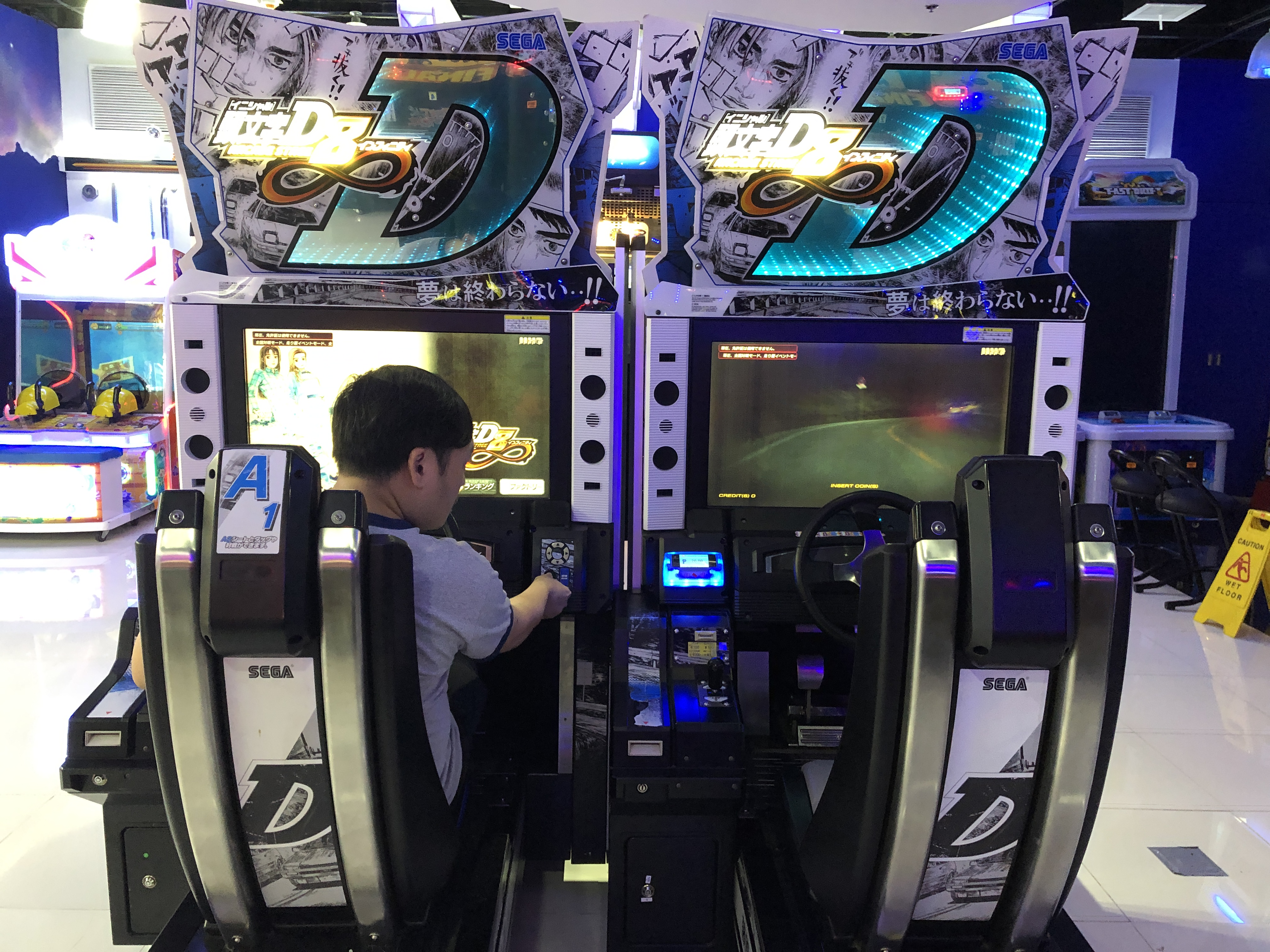
The Initial D arcade game series is successful in Japan, but did not appeal as much to the western arcade market.

Tastes for arcade games changed on both sides of the world, with Masao Yoshimoto saying that potential new employees mentioned in interviews that the newer arcade games with flat panel card readers are their reason for joining Sega, rather than machines like the R360. Large driving game cabinets became less appealing to the Japanese youth, whilst retaining some success overseas. Western arcades became focused on casual players, while core players remained in Asia. This motivated Sega to establish a development base to develop games that better suited the Western markets, housed within sales subsidiary Sega Amusements Europe. Trading card arcade games continued to be successful for Sega in Japan, with the latest example being Sangokushi Taisen, being developed by developers previously engaged in console games such as Sakura Wars. The Nintendo DS versions of kids arcade games Mushiking, Love & Berry and Dinosaur King were released, and particularly Love & Berry was successful as it became the first million-seller for Sega in Japan since Virtua Fighter 2.

Yuji Naka left during this period in 2006, with Yu Suzuki following in 2011, in the wake of his second post-AM2 studio, AM Plus, disbanding after producing only one title that made it to market (Sega Race TV).

Department	Division	Members From	Headed by	Notable Titles	Ref.
GE1 (includes Sonic Team)	Consumer R&D, Sega Corporation	Sonic Team	Akinori Nishiyama	Puyo Puyo series; Mind Quiz; Sonic the Hedgehog series	
GE2	Consumer R&D, Sega Corporation	Sega WOW	Akira Nishino	Blazer Drive; Sakura Wars: So Long, My Love; Valkyria Chronicles	
GE3 (includes Sonic Team)	Consumer R&D, Sega Corporation	Sonic Team	Takao Miyoshi	Phantasy Star Universe	
NE	Consumer R&D, Sega Corporation	Amusement Vision	Toshihiro Nagoshi	Super Monkey Ball series; Yakuza series	
Sports Design	Consumer R&D, Sega Corporation	Smilebit	Takaya Segawa	Pro Soccer Club o Tsukurou! series; Mario & Sonic at the Olympic Games; Virtua Pro Football	
AM1	Amusement R&D, Sega Corporation	Sega WOW	Yasuhiro Nishiyama	Answer X Answer series; Sangokushi Taisen series; The House of the Dead 4	
AM2	Amusement R&D, Sega Corporation	Sega-AM2	Hiroshi Kataoka	After Burner Climax; Sega Network Taisen Mahjong MJ series; Virtua Fighter 5	
AM3	Amusement R&D, Sega Corporation	Hitmaker	Mie Kumagai	Initial D Arcade Stage series; Virtua Tennis 3; World Club Champion Football series	
AM Plus	Amusement R&D, Sega Corporation	Sega-AM2	Yu Suzuki	Sega Race TV	
Family Entertainment	Amusement R&D, Sega Corporation	Mirai R&D	Hiroshi Uemura	Mushiking series; Love and Berry series	
Products	Amusement R&D, Sega Corporation	Sega Mechatro	Masao Yoshimoto	Medal games; Starhorse series; UFO Catcher series	
Sega Amusement Europe	Amusement R&D, Sega Corporation	Cardiff R&D	Patrick Michael	Ford Racing: Full Blown; Sega Rally 3	
Sega Studios Shanghai	Sega of China	Sega WOW	Makoto Uchida	Altered Beast; NiGHTS Into Dreams; Sega Ages 2500 Series Vol. 26: Dynamite Deka	
Sega Studio USA	Sega of America	Sonic Team USA	Takashi Iizuka	Shadow the Hedgehog; Nights: Journey of Dreams	

== 2009–2017 ==
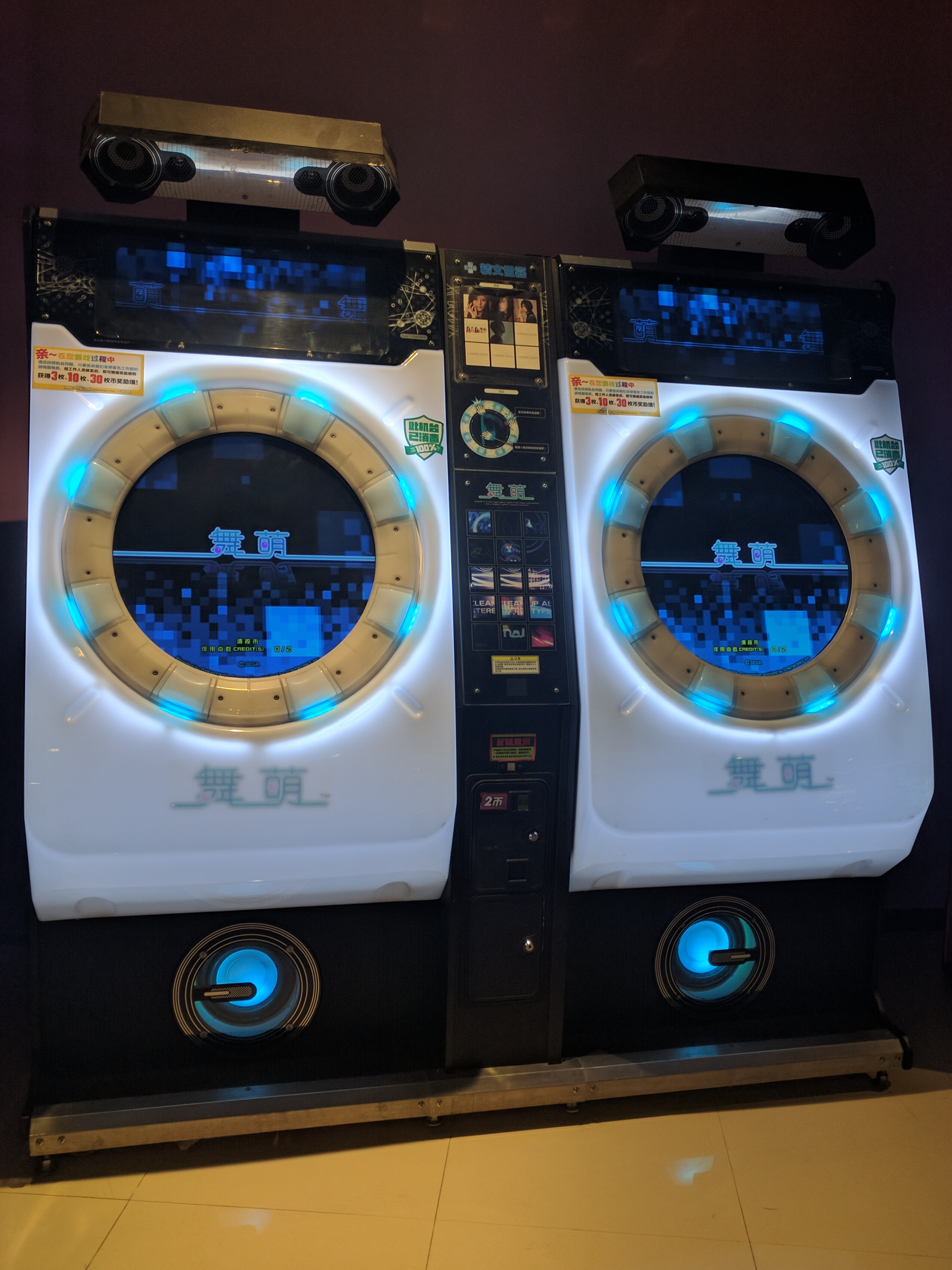
Maimai arcade cabinets have been updated for over a decade.

Sega management had high expectations for Nagoshi to develop a worldwide hit after creating the successful Yakuza series, which eventually became Binary Domain. Similarly the developers behind IP that sold well in Japan had a desire to aim for worldwide audiences, much like the developers behind the Sonic the Hedgehog, Super Monkey Ball and Mario & Sonic games. Binary Domain was a commercial failure, which made the Yakuza team reflect on to keep making authentic Japanese games rather than being anything else.

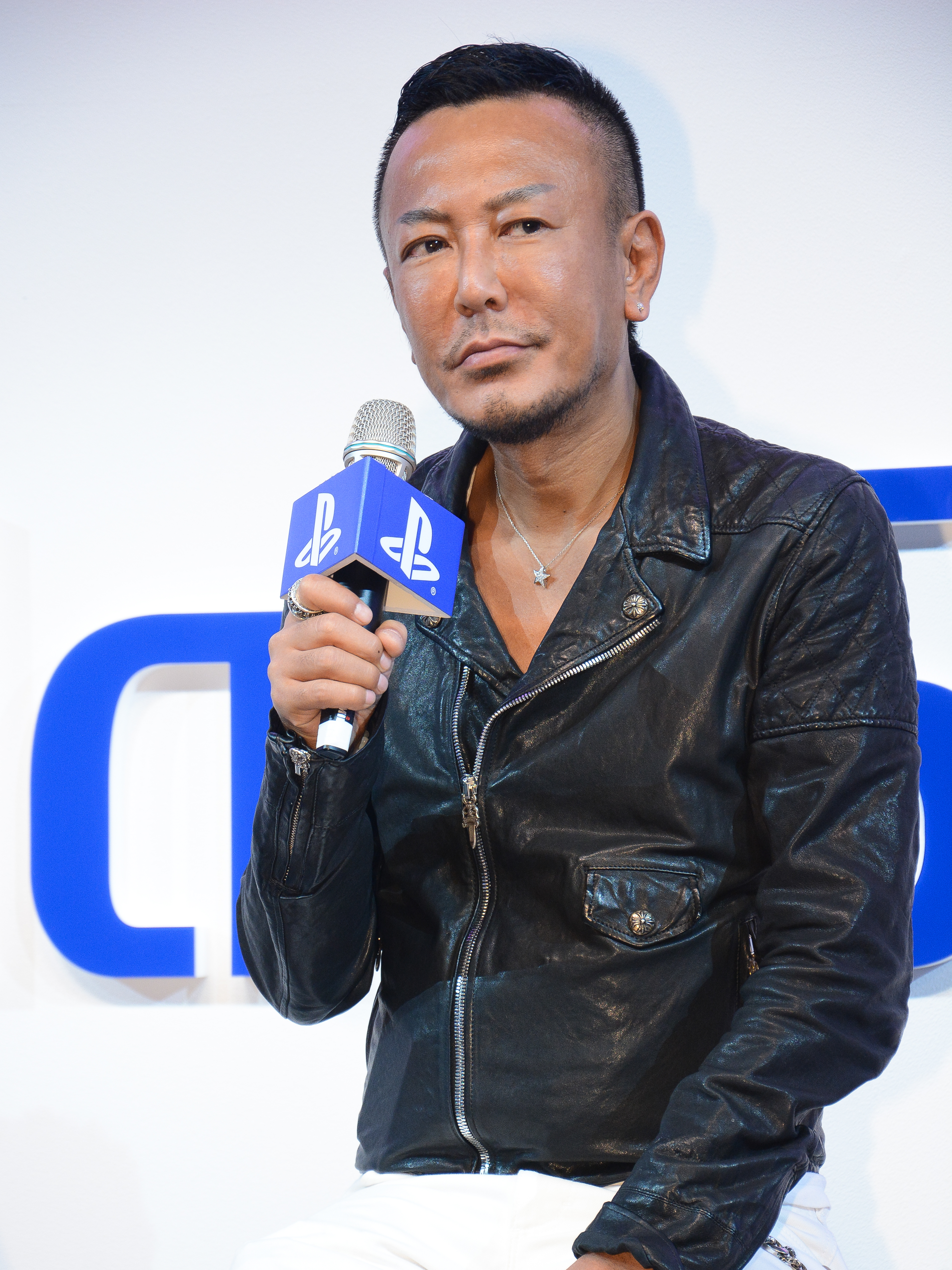
Toshihiro Nagoshi became Chief Creative Officer of Sega in 2012.

Games for smartphones became a huge focus, particular with the keywords free to play and cross play. Sega learned from its experience from Kingdom Conquest which it translated to Samurai & Dragons for PlayStation Vita. Particularly Phantasy Star Online 2 was very much developed to be multi-platform with the addition of the PC platform and Vita, it also having versions available on iOS and Android. Arcade staff also began developing for smartphones with Alexandria Bloodshow and Samurai Bloodshow, which lead to Chain Chronicle, a successful earner for Sega. AM2 also began to develop smartphone games with Soul Reverse Zero.

The markets in North America and Europe were seen as very "tough", with Sega taking sight on the wider Asian market instead. In 2012 Sega announced that for the West they would focus on fewer franchises which were Sonic the Hedgehog, Total War, Football Manager and Aliens, with Sonic being the only Japanese IP. Atlus became part of Sega in 2013, with the acquisition of Atlus USA being finalized in 2016. Atlus USA made it possible to localize Japanese Sega IP such as Yakuza and Hatsune Miku: Project DIVA to the western market. With the new policy of increasing localized titles again, the "bridge team" was founded in 2017, to better support communication between Sega of America and Japan.

Profits for arcade games were still higher than for console, mobile and PC games all the way to the fiscal year of 2014. According to AM2 developer Makoto Osaki, Sega shifted its focus to internet games in the arcades rather than huge cabinets after server maintenance costs went down. Border Break became a huge success being supported for many years in arcades. Port requests for Border Break have been there since the beginning, however Sega remained concerned that people stop going to the arcade if it didn't remain arcade exclusive, only after the decrease of arcades across Japan and receiving player comments that they needed to drive several hours to get to an arcade, it was decided that the game would receive a PlayStation 4 port, about 9 years later. Music games became another area of success for Sega with Hatsune Miku: Project Diva Arcade and Maimai, both of which received many updates, and subsequent titles made by the same team as the latter such as Chunithm. Long time musician Takenobu Mitsuyoshi has said that the arcade industry in Japan is "fundamentally not strong" right now, mentioning that music games have developed long standing popularity against those odds. Ports of arcade games were developed primarily as downloadable games for PlayStation 3 and Xbox 360 with Virtua Fighter 5: Final Showdown, The House of the Dead 4 and After Burner Climax, among others.

Department	Division	Members From	Headed by	Notable Titles	Ref.
CS1 (includes Ryu Ga Gotoku Studio)	Consumer R&D, Sega Corporation (2009–2015) Sega Games Co., Ltd. (2015–2018)	NE R&D + Sports R&D	Toshihiro Nagoshi	Binary Domain; Super Monkey Ball series; Yakuza series	
CS2 (includes Sonic Team)	Consumer R&D, Sega Corporation (2009–2015) Sega Games Co., Ltd. (2015–2018)	GE1 R&D + Sega Studio USA + Sports R&D	Takashi Iizuka, Osamu Ohashi	Mario & Sonic series; Puyo Puyo series; Sonic the Hedgehog series	
CS3	Consumer R&D, Sega Corporation (2009–2015) Sega Games Co., Ltd. (2015–2018)	GE2 R&D	Akira Nishino	Hatsune Miku: Project DIVA series; Rise of Nightmares; Valkyria Chronicles series	
Sega Networks	Consumer R&D, Sega Corporation (2009–2015) Sega Games Co., Ltd. (2015–2018)	NE R&D	Masayoshi Kikuchi	Demon Tribe; Kingdom Conquest series; War Pirates	
Online	Consumer R&D, Sega Corporation (2009–2015) Sega Games Co., Ltd. (2015–2018)	GE3 R&D	Takaya Segawa	Dragon Coins; Phantasy Star Online 2; Yakyuu Tsuku!!	
AM1/R&D #1	Amusement R&D, Sega Corporation (2009–2015) Sega Interactive Co., Ltd. (2015–2018)	AM1 +AM3	Yasuhiro Nishiyama	Initial D Arcade Stage series; Maimai series; World Club Champion Football series	
AM2/R&D #2	Amusement R&D, Sega Corporation (2009–2015) Sega Interactive Co., Ltd. (2015–2018)	AM2 + AM3 + AM Plus	Hiroshi Kataoka	Border Break series; Hatsune Miku: Project DIVA Arcade series; Kancolle Arcade	
Products	Amusement R&D, Sega Corporation (2009–2015) Sega Interactive Co., Ltd. (2015–2018)	Same as before	Unknown	UFO Catcher series	
N.Pro	Amusement R&D, Sega Corporation (2009–2015) Sega Interactive Co., Ltd. (2015–2018)	Products R&D	Yuji Sugimori	E-DEL Sand; Nail Puri	
Sega Amusements Europe	Amusement R&D, Sega Corporation (2009–2015) Sega Interactive Co., Ltd. (2015–2018)	Same as before	Paul Willams	Race Driver: GRID; Showdown; Dream Raiders	
Sega Studios Shanghai	Sega of China	Same as before	Makoto Uchida	Daytona Championship USA; Dreamcast Collection; Transformers: Human Alliance	

== 2018–present ==
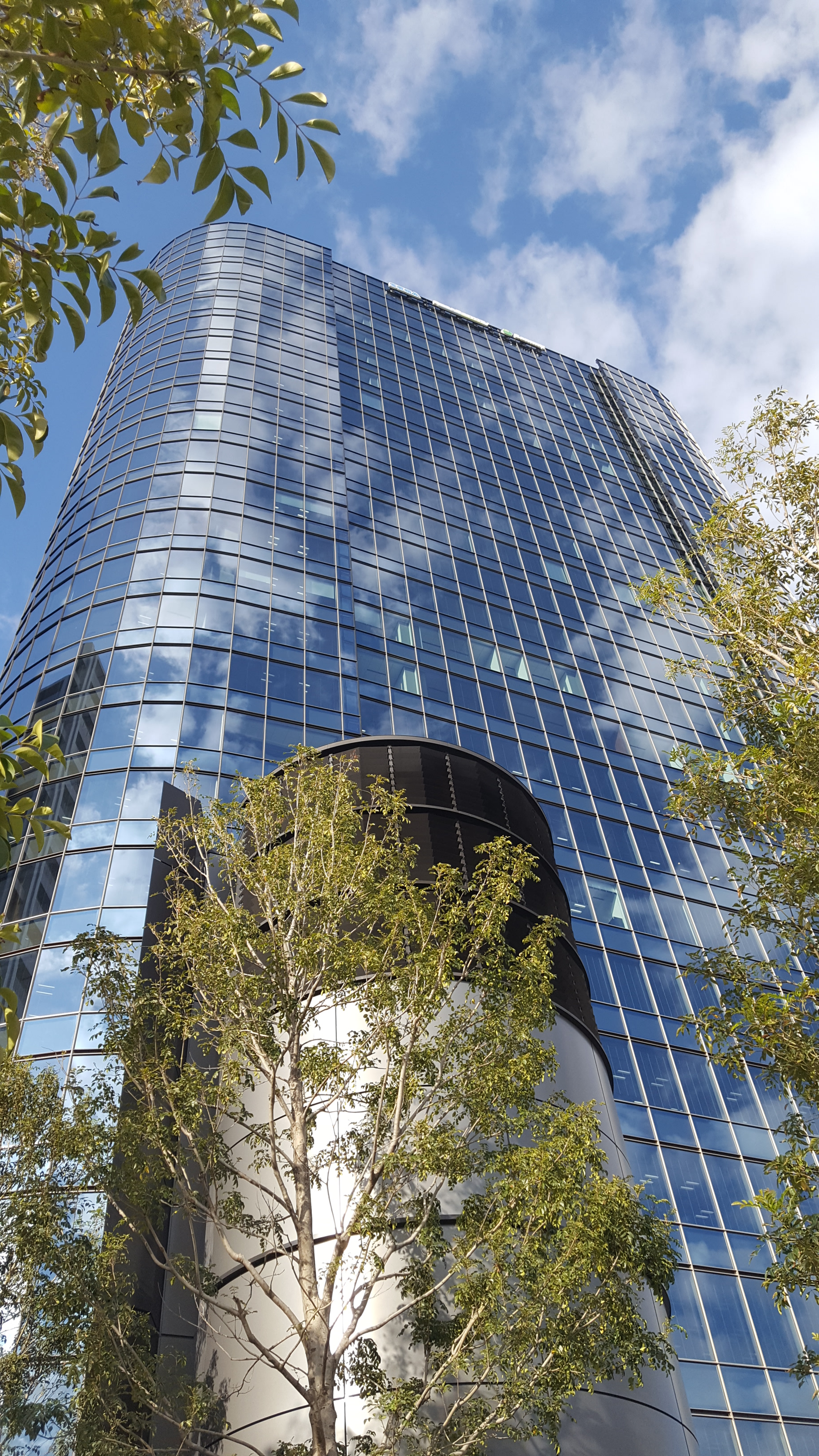
Sega moved from Ota, Tokyo to Shinagawa, Tokyo in 2018, along with many other companies from the Sega Sammy Group umbrella.

The COVID-19 pandemic caused Sega to restructure their arcade business and place some of its developers onto console and smartphone games.

In 2019, Sega conceived "Super Game", a framework of game development that had the following requirements: online, IP utilization, multi-platform, multi-language, simultaneous worldwide release and AAA. Development teams of a Super Game would have been be a hybrid of developers that were previously involved in console, mobile and arcade games that would eventually add up to several hundred people. Of the four development divisions, the 3rd was confirmed to be developing these titles, with over 600 employees who have experience developing GaaS type titles, including Phantasy Star Online 2 as well as various mobile and arcade games. Unreal Engine 5 would have been used, with Unreal Engine 4 already being utilized other development teams. The latter was first used by the arcade divisions during the late 2010s on Sega World Drivers Championship and House of the Dead: Scarlet Dawn, and then Ryu Ga Gotoku Studio with its remake of Like A Dragon: Ishin!. Sega planned to resurrect past examples of IP for these projects. The first game of this category was scheduled to release by the fiscal year of 2026. The name Super Game was chosen to differentiate it from the Metaverse. In an investors Q&A for the second quarter of the 2026 fiscal year, Sega has mentioned that several aspects of "Super Game" are currently under review due to "community features" adding cost and the current market environment. Super Game was announced to be cancelled during the results presentation of the 2026 fiscal year. Additionally it was announced that free to play is less of a priority. Division 3 itself confirmed that they are working on a new Crazy Taxi game, spent the last four years learning Unreal Engine, and stepped in to help other divisions who also use the engine.

Division 1 and 2 are mainly focused on developing the Like a Dragon and Sonic the Hedgehog games, respectively, with additional capacity for other series' releases such as Virtua Fighter, Super Monkey Ball, Puyo Puyo, and RPGs, while Division 4 focuses on mobile. Division 2 is also overseeing the development of reviving legacy Sega IP. This includes outsourced projects, such as Shinobi: Art of Vengeance by Lizardcube, which has had guidance from veteran Sakura Wars and Sangokushi Taisen developer Toru Ohara. Broadly, the internal Japanese studios are categorized between two "Japan Asia Studios Business Units" with Osamu Ohashi and Takaya Segawa heading them respectively as Executive Officers and Vice Presidents.

A secondary development base called Sega Sapporo Studio was established in 2021.

Nagoshi and Daisuke Sato left Ryu Ga Gotoku Studio in 2021.

In a 2024 interview, Sega executive Shuji Utsumi mentioned that the dedicated arcade development division in Japan was closed, with the vast majority of its video game-focused developers merged into the remaining four divisions. Developers associated with AM2 brand titles such as Virtua Fighter generally appear to have been working at Division 1, whilst those from AM1 are under Division 2, with the Maimai and Initial D teams confirmed to be assisting the development of Samba de Amigo: Party Central and Sonic Racing: CrossWorlds whilst continuing to update their games. Others more focused on UFO Catchers, medal games, photo booths and other non-video game arcade products have remained in separate departments, moving to Sega Fave upon its 2024 formation.

Sega Amusements International was sold in 2021 via a management buyout, but has retained its inhouse R&D studio in Cardiff, Wales for work with external developers, as well as the continued rights to the Sega brand and Western sales of certain remaining Japan-developed arcade games (such as House of the Dead: Scarlet Dawn and from 2025 Maimai DX) through a royalty agreement.

=== 2018 - 2020 ===
Department	Division	Members From	Headed by	Notable Titles	Ref.
J&A (Japan & Asia) Studio 1 (includes Ryu Ga Gotoku Studio)	Consumer R&D, Sega Games Co., Ltd. (2018–2020)	CS1 R&D	Toshihiro Nagoshi	Judgment; Super Monkey Ball: Banana Blitz HD; Yakuza/Like A Dragon series	
J&A Studio 2 (includes Sonic Team)	Consumer R&D, Sega Games Co., Ltd. (2018–2020)	CS2 R&D; CS3 R&D	Eigo Kasahara	Mario & Sonic at the Olympic Games Tokyo 2020; Puyo Puyo series; Sakura Wars	
J&A Studio 3	Consumer R&D, Sega Games Co., Ltd. (2018–2020)	Online R&D	Takaya Segawa	Ryu Ga Gotoku Online; Phantasy Star Online 2	
J&A Studio 4	Consumer R&D, Sega Games Co., Ltd. (2018–2020)	Sega Networks	Masayoshi Kikuchi	SEGA Pocket Club Manager; Shin Megami Tensei: Liberation Dx2; One Piece Bounty Rush	
J&A Studio 5 #1	Amusement R&D, Sega Interactive Co., Ltd. (2018–2020)	Sega AM1	Yasuhiro Nishiyama	House of the Dead: Scarlet Dawn; WCCF Footista; Sega World Drivers Championship	
J&A Studio 5 #2	Amusement R&D, Sega Interactive Co., Ltd. (2018–2020)	Sega AM2	Hiroshi Kataoka	Border Break; Fate/Grand Order Arcade; Soul Reverse	
J&A Studio 5 #3	Amusement R&D, Sega Interactive Co., Ltd. (2018–2020)	Sega AM1	Unknown	Chunithm series; Maimai series; Ongeki series	
J&A Studio 5 Products	Amusement R&D, Sega Interactive Co., Ltd. (2018–2020)	Same as before	Unknown	Medal games; UFO Catcher series; Photo booths	
Sega Amusements International	Amusement R&D, Sega Interactive Co., Ltd. (2018–2020)	Sega Amusements Europe	Patrick Michael, Shinichi Osagawara	Transformers: Shadows Rising	
Sega Studios Shanghai	Sega of China	Same as before	Makoto Uchida	Transformers: Shadows Rising	

=== 2021 - current ===
Department	Division	Members From	Headed by	Notable Titles	Ref.
Japan Asia Studios Business Unit 1, Div. 1 (includes Ryu Ga Gotoku Studio and Sega AM2)	R&D, Sega Corporation (2021–present)	J&A Studio 1; J&A Studio 5 #2	Masayoshi Yokoyama, Osamu Ohashi	Super Monkey Ball series; Virtua Fighter series; Yakuza/Like A Dragon series	
Japan Asia Studios Business Unit 1, Div. 2 (includes Sonic Team)	R&D, Sega Corporation (2021–present)	J&A Studio 2; J&A Studio 5 #1; J&A Studio 5 #3	Osamu Ohashi	Puyo Puyo series; Sonic the Hedgehog series; Samba de Amigo: Party Central	
Japan Asia Studios Business Unit 1, Div. 2, 2nd Development Department	R&D, Sega Corporation (2021–present)	J&A Studio 2; J&A Studio 5 #1; J&A Studio 5 #3	Osamu Ohashi	Initial D Arcade Stage series; Maimai series; Sangokushi Taisen series	
Japan Asia Studios Business Unit 2, Div. 3	R&D, Sega Corporation (2021–present)	J&A Studio 3, 4 & 5	Yuya Kimura, Takaya Segawa	Crazy Taxi: World Tour; Phantasy Star Online 2: New Genesis; Sega Network Taisen Mahjong MJ	
Japan Asia Studios Business Unit 2, Div. 4	R&D, Sega Corporation (2021–present)	J&A Studio 4	Katsutoshi Kioka, Takaya Segawa	404 GAME RE:SET; Hatsune Miku: Colorful Stage; Sonic Rumble Party	
Japan Asia Studios Business Unit 2, Sega Sapporo Studio	R&D, Sega Corporation (2021–present)	New	Takaya Segawa	Support studio	
Sega Fave	R&D, Sega Corporation (2021–present)	Products	Unknown	Medal games; UFO Catcher series; Photo booths	
Sega Amusements International	Kaizen Entertainment (2021–present)	Same as before	Patrick Michael, Shinichi Osagawara	MISSION: IMPOSSIBLE ARCADE	
Sega Studios Shanghai	Sega of China	Same as before	Makoto Uchida	MISSION: IMPOSSIBLE ARCADE	

== Acquired/founded studios ==
Studio	Division	Year of purchase /founding	Notable titles
Creative Assembly	Sega Europe	2005	Alien: Isolation; Spartan: Total Warrior; Total War (series)
Sports Interactive	Sega Europe	2006	Eastside Hockey Manager series; Football Manager series
Hardlight	Sega Europe	2012	Sonic the Hedgehog series; Chu Chu Rocket Universe!; Crazy Taxi: City Rush
Atlus	Sega Corporation, Japan Asia Studios Business Unit 1	2013	Megami Tensei series; Etrian Odyssey series; Persona series
Play Heart	Sega Corporation, Japan Asia Studios Business Unit 2	2015	Fist of the North Star LEGENDS ReVIVE; Gold Rebellion R; Liberation of Azure
Two Point Studios	Sega Europe	2019	Two Point Campus; Two Point Hospital
Rovio Entertainment	Sega Europe	2023	Angry Birds series; Small Town Murder; Sugar Blast

=== Former studios ===
Studio	Division	Year of purchase /founding	Year of release /dissolution	Fate	Notable titles
Gremlin Industries	Sega Enterprises	1978	1983	Sold and Merged into Bally Manufacturing	Deep Scan; Head On; Monaco GP
Sega Technical Institute	Sega of America	1990	1996	Dissolved	Comix Zone; Dick Tracy; Sonic the Hedgehog series
SONIC! Software Planning	Sega	1991	1995	Merged into Camelot Software Planning	Shining series
CRI	Sega	1991	2004	Remained with CSK following their divestiture of Sega	Dyna Brothers; Aero Dancing; Charge'n Blast
SIMS	Sega	1991	2004	Dissolved	OutRun 2019; Sega Bass Fishing; Stellar Assault
Sega Interactive	Sega of America	1992	2000	Dissolved	Eternal Champions series; Garfield: Caught in the Act
Sega Midwest Studio	Sega of America	1992	1995	Dissolved	World Heroes; NHL All-Star Hockey '95
Sega Multimedia Studio	Sega of America	1992	1997	Dissolved	Jurassic Park; Wild Woody
SegaSoft	Sega of America	1995	2000	Initially created as a joint venture with CSK. Dissolved in 2000 and remaining staff moved to the Sega.com entity	HEAT.net; Lose Your Marbles
No Cliché	Sega Europe	1999	2004	Dissolved	Toy Commander; Toy Racer
Visual Concepts	Sega of America	1999	2005	Sold to Take-Two Interactive	Floigan Bros.; NFL 2K series; NBA 2K series
Sega Racing Studio	Sega Europe	2005	2008	Sold and Merged into Codemasters	Sega Rally Revo
Sega Studios San Francisco	Sega of America	2006	2010	Dissolved	Iron Man series; Golden Axe: Beast Rider
Sega Studios Australia	Sega Europe	2006	2013	Dissolved	Medieval II: Total War; Castle of Illusion Starring Mickey Mouse; London 2012
Three Rings Design	Sega of America	2011	2016	Dissolved	Puzzle Pirates; Spiral Knights
Relic Entertainment	Sega Europe	2013	2024	Became independent with assistance from external investor	Age of Empires IV; Company of Heroes series; Dawn of War series
Demiurge Studios	Sega of America, Mobile development	2015	2020	Sold back to co-founder and then to Embracer Group under Saber Interactive	Crazy Taxi: Gazillionaire; Sega Heroes
Amplitude Studios	Sega Europe	2016	2024	Management buyout	Endless Space; Endless Legend; Humankind

== See also ==
- Lists of Sega games
