= The Lost World: Jurassic Park (arcade game) =

1997 video game

- Arcade flyer
- Developer: Sega AM3
- Publisher: Sega
- Director: Shinichi Ogasawara
- Producer: Mie Kumagai
- Series: Jurassic Park
- Platform: Arcade
- Release: NA/UK: September 1997
- Genre: Rail shooter
- Modes: Single-player, multiplayer
- Arcade system: Sega Model 3 (Step 1.5)

The Lost World: Jurassic Park is a 1997 rail shooter video game developed and published by Sega for arcades, based on the film of the same name. It is also a sequel to Sega's 1994 Jurassic Park arcade game. A third Jurassic Park arcade game, based on Jurassic Park III, was released by Konami in 2001.

== Gameplay ==
Ian Malcolm and Sarah Harding go missing after landing on Isla Sorna to conduct an investigation. A rescue team is sent to the island. The player controls one of two rangers, whose goal is to find Dr. Malcolm and Dr. Harding. Players battle dinosaurs by disabling them with tranquilizer darts.

The game features five levels based on environments from the film, including a laboratory and a workers' village. Four of the levels feature a boss battle that must be won to advance the game. Boss enemies include Tyrannosaurus, Carnotaurus, and Deinosuchus. Velociraptors are also featured as enemies throughout the game. Compsognathus, Dilophosaurus, Pachycephalosaurus, and pterosaurs are also encountered throughout the game. At times, the game presents the player with an opportunity to rescue a human who is being attacked by one or multiple dinosaurs. Saving the human results in the human rewarding the player with either a temporary weapon upgrade or additional health.

Like some of Sega's light gun rail shooters such as Virtua Cop and The House of the Dead, The Lost World: Jurassic Park features a dynamically adjusting difficulty system that will increase difficulty as the player progresses and decrease as they lose lives. As difficulty increases, dinosaurs attack quicker, more dinosaurs will try to attack the player simultaneously, and more target icons need to be shot to cancel a boss dinosaur's attack.

== Development ==
The Lost World: Jurassic Park is based on Steven Spielberg's 1997 film of the same name. Having developed the original Jurassic Park arcade game, Sega AM3, a division of Sega, became interested in making the game after hearing about the film. Additionally hoping that they could make use of Sega's new relationship with Spielberg's company DreamWorks Pictures (the two companies were partnered for the GameWorks chain of entertainment venues), producer Mie Kumagai presented her ideas to AM3 president Hisao Oguchi, who approved. AM3 began developing the game in early 1997, after receiving permission from Universal Studios. Shinichi Ogasawara was the game's director.

The development team wanted the sequel to have more tension. Sega AM3 utilized Sega's Model 3 arcade system board, as Model 2 was not advanced enough for certain features. Model 3 allowed the game to operate at 60 frames and 100,000 polygons per second. It was the first shooting game to use Model 3, which Sega AM3 had never used before. The development team had difficulty designing the game due to unfamiliarity with Model 3. The team also faced a tight deadline to get the game finished and released.

Early in development, the developers only had access to the film's original script. Action scenes from the script were added into the game. Approximately three months before the game's completion, various materials related to the film were sent to the development team, who then added extra elements to the game. The developers had little communication with the film's creators and instead worked mainly with the film's promotional crew. Some of the development team members went to the United States to visit the film's sets, which inspired the level designs. The development team also planned to visit Industrial Light & Magic (ILM), but the company was too busy creating special effects for the film. Instead, the team visited Stan Winston and observed some of his full size velociraptors created for the film.

The developers considered adding a creature similar to the Loch Ness Monster, but later dropped the idea as it was decided it would have been awkward for the player to shoot. A Deinosuchus was used instead. The game's dinosaurs were designed from scratch by Sega AM3, as ILM's production sketches were unavailable. Velociraptor was among the most difficult dinosaurs to design due to its quick movements. The development team also spent considerable time deciding how to make the game's main dinosaur, the Tyrannosaurus, appear frightening and impressive. The Carnotaurus, which appeared in the original script for the film, was implemented into the game, as the developers expected ILM to create the creature for use in the film. The developers initially planned to make the two-player mode different from the one-player mode, in regard to routes the players would take or the types of dinosaurs they would encounter. This idea was scrapped due to time constraints. The game was publicly announced in the first quarter of 1997, and was unveiled in June at the Electronic Entertainment Expo (E3).

== Release ==
The Lost World: Jurassic Park was released in the United States and the United Kingdom in September 1997. It was housed in a "theater style" cabinet with a 50-inch monitor, two light guns, and four-speaker surround sound. Spielberg received one of the arcade cabinets as a gift from Sega of America.

=== Special edition ===
In late 1997, an updated version of the game was released in Japan, exclusively at Joypolis locations. Titled The Lost World Special, the new hydraulic game cabinet features seats that rotate and rock from side to side, and an 80-inch screen, compared to the original version's 50-inch screen. A burst of air blows out at the player(s) whenever the Tyrannosaurus roars. The game was rewritten to more closely follow the film's plot. Some ideas that were scrapped from the original game were implemented into the Special game, and some levels were moved around. The Carnotaurus was cut from the game and replaced with a final level of a Tyrannosaurus rampaging through San Diego, as in the film.

=== Cancelled port ===
In January 1998, Sega AM3 said it would be impossible to port the game to the Sega Saturn, but expressed interest in a PC version. A Dreamcast version was announced in 1999, and was to include larger levels than the arcade version. In August 1999, Sega AM3 was in the process of converting the game for release in Japan in January 2000, with a possible U.S. release in the spring of 2000. However, these plans were cancelled by January 2001.

== Reception ==
In Japan, Game Machine listed The Lost World: Jurassic Park as the third most successful dedicated arcade game of August 1997.

GamePro wrote that the game, when it was unveiled at E3, "was so cool, it earned ShowStopper status even as a display," while Next Generation wrote that it was, "Easily one of the most impressive titles at E3". Electronic Gaming Monthly called it "Probably the most impressive of the arcade games featured [at E3 1997]". Next Generation also reported, "Some rival companies privately admitted: 'This game is so exciting, it could have become a hit even without the licensed property behind it.'" After the game's release, Johnny Ballgame of GamePro wrote that the graphics "are a giant leap forward for gun games in terms of sight and speed." Computer and Video Games wrote that the graphics "look amazingly authentic". Sega Saturn Magazine wrote that the game's graphics "are to die for", noting that the game featured "the best dinosaurs ever seen outside of the cinema". Arcade magazine called the game "hours of mindless fun," and "a fantastic coin-op shooter which bore little resemblance to its cinematic cousin".

The Lost World: Jurassic Park was a runner-up for "Arcade Game of the Year" (behind NFL Blitz) at Electronic Gaming Monthly's 1997 Editors' Choice Awards.

Anthony Baize of AllGame rated The Lost World: Jurassic Park four and a half stars out of five, and wrote, "The programmers did an excellent job to make gamers feel as if they are in the middle of an island with crazed dinosaurs as far as the eye can see." Baize praised the graphics, writing that the game "is a masterpiece. The graphics look as if they have been lifted from its namesake movie. [...] The dinosaurs look and sound real. That is fairly amazing." However, Baize criticized the game's loud sounds, saying that "the deafening sound coming from the speakers may be The Lost World: Jurassic Park's only real flaw. There is a line where anything can be considered to be too loud, and The Lost World: Jurassic Park crosses that line. While the loud sound is supposed to engage the gamer thoroughly, it can be distracting. [...] The sound is a bit too loud, but that should not keep anyone from playing it."

In 2012, CraveOnline included the game on its list of "8 Arcade Games We Want Revived." In 2017, TechRadar ranked The Lost World: Jurassic Park among the 50 best arcade games of all time, writing that it was remembered as "the only good Jurassic Park game" and that its graphics were "unmatched" at the time of its release, while concluding that it "still makes us long for a proper Jurassic Park game every time we see it."

== See also ==
- Jurassic Park video games
- The Lost World: Jurassic Park (video game), a listing of games based on The Lost World: Jurassic Park
