= Rail Chase 2 =

1995 arcade game

- Rail Chase 2 arcade cabinet
- Developer: Sega AM3
- Publisher: Sega
- Director: Tomosuke Tsuda
- Producers: Hisao Oguchi; Mie Kumagai
- Designer: Kimio Tsuda
- Programmer: Takeshi Goden
- Artist: Tetsu Okano
- Composers: Maki Morrow; Seiichiro Matsumura
- Platform: Arcade
- Release: JP: June 1995; NA: November 1995
- Genre: Rail shooter
- Modes: Single-player, multiplayer
- Arcade system: Sega Model 2

Rail Chase 2 (レールチェイス2) is a rail shooter video game developed and published by Sega for arcades in 1995. It is the sequel to the original Rail Chase arcade game from 1991.

== Gameplay ==
Rail Chase 2 is a game set in a coalmine cart racing along its set tracks through various environments as players shoot at everything they see.

== Development ==
Rail Chase 2 was developed by Japanese studio Sega AM3, led by producer Hisao Oguchi. This was the first game worked on by assistant producer and future AM3 head Mie Kumagai, who had recently transferred from Sega's amusement park division. Kumagai stated she had brought in because AM3's staff had grown to about 100 people at this point, making it difficult for Oguchi to oversee projects directly. Kumagai also shared an ideology with AM3 that arcade games should be created to appeal to not just boys, but to girls, couples, and families. She worked closely with programmer Takeshi Goden on the project. The game is a sequel to 1991's Rail Chase, which was built on the sprite-based Sega System 32. Rail Chase 2 utilizes the Sega Model 2, which allowed for 3D, texture mapped polygons. The sequel also follows Rail Chase: The Ride, an attraction featured at Sega's Joypolis theme park in Yokohama from 1994 to 2001. Sega of America's vice president of sales and marketing, Ken Anderson, described Rail Chase 2 as an extension of AM3's popular rail shooter Jurassic Park. Rail Chase 2 was released in Japan in June 1995. It was displayed prominently at the Amusement & Music Operators Association (AMOA) show that September alongside other Sega arcade cabinets including Virtua Fighter 2, Virtua Striker, and Indy 500.

== Reception ==
Reception

Review scores
Publication	Score
Next Generation	3/5
Sega Pro	85/100
Super GamePower	4.5/5

In Japan, Game Machine listed Rail Chase 2 in their August 15, 1995 issue as the fourteenth most-successful dedicated arcade game of the first two weeks of that month. It rose to ninth place during the next two weeks and continued to chart at certain points throughout the rest of the year.

Critical reception for Rail Chase 2 was favorable. Nick Roberts of Sega Pro lavished the game with praise, scoring it 85 out of 100. Considering it a fusion of Jurassic Park and Virtua Cop, he summarized, "Iťs fast paced, iťs slick, iťs pretty dam good! You’ll be so mesmerised by the great graphics and sound plus the constant bombardment of cronies to shoot that you’ll just háve to keep playing!" The Spanish magazine Última Generación likewise drew positive comparisons to the Virtua line and Jurassic Park when referencing the visuals and moving arcade cabinet of Rail Chase 2. The writer called it a "Sega Indiana Jones makeover" that is "worth spending a few games to understand how Harrison Ford felt." Next Generation rated the game three stars out of five and stated, "The levels vary greatly – the icelandic and jungle stages are especially imaginative and fun – various tracks can be chosen by shooting at the train stop sign, and the action never stops. This game is simple fun, just like the arcades used to be." Game Players similarly described it as "just plain fun," finding the polygon graphics "beautiful" when compared to its sprite-based predecessor and saying that its "speed is captured so well that you lose your stomach going over some of the hills."
