= Mie Kumagai =

Video game producer

- 熊谷 美恵
- Born: June 11, 1968 (age 57); Kanagawa Prefecture, Japan
- Occupation(s): Video game producer, director
- Employer(s): Sega (1983–2015); Colopl (2015–present)
- Known for: Being the first female head of a Japanese game studio
- Notable work: Virtua Tennis series
- Spouse: Takeshi Goden

Mie Kumagai (熊谷 美恵, Kumagai Mie; born June 11, 1968) is a Japanese video game producer. She began working at Sega in 1993 as an amusement park attraction planner and transferred to the arcade division of its AM3 studio two years later. When this studio's boss, Hisao Oguchi, was promoted to president of the whole company in 2003, Kumagai became the new AM3 head and the first ever female president within Sega's development structure or any Japanese development studio. She produced a number of arcade titles before helming Sega's successful Virtua Tennis series for arcades and home consoles. As of 2015, Kumagai is an executive producer at the mobile game company Colopl.

== Early life ==
Kumagai was born on June 11, 1968, in Kanagawa Prefecture. She had very little interest in video games in her youth but briefly played the arcade game Rally-X and then the Game Boy titles Tetris and Final Fantasy Legend II. She played some tennis as a student though she had a greater personal interest in skiing and windsurfing. Kumagai attended Hosei University where she obtained a degree in philosophy in 1991.

== Career ==
During the Japanese economic bubble in the early 1990s, Kumagai worked for an art consulting firm and then AOKI International, a men's clothing company, after the bubble burst. She worked at AOKI's corporate planning office for about a year and a half before finding a newspaper article about Sega Enterprises and its prospects of opening amusement parks throughout Japan. A presentation to producer Tetsuya Mizuguchi, head of Sega's Emotional Design Laboratory, led to her to being hired in 1993 as a Joypolis theme attraction planner for that division of the company. It was around this time that she truly became interested in video games. In 1995, Kumagai was transferred to the arcade division of Sega AM3 research and development studio under Hisao Oguchi. She began working as a producer alongside programmer and eventual husband Takeshi Goden. They created the on-rails arcade titles Rail Chase 2 and Magical Truck Adventure, two games Kumagai thought female gamers could play together and would also appeal to families and couples. She claimed she had couples in mind when designing these games rather than targeting female players specifically. She would keep this ideology throughout most of her career.

Kumagai also served as producer on releases such as Gunblade NY, DecAthlete, Winter Heat, and The Lost World: Jurassic Park. At this point, she was the only female producer among 62 women and 575 men in Sega's AM departments. Seeing the popularity of one-on-one fighting games in Japanese arcades throughout the decade inspired Kumagai to create a similar experience. She decided on a sports game to, again, appeal to broad demographics of consumers, pointing to the recent favorable critical and commercial performance of Sega AM2's Virtua Striker. Kumagai presented a planned basketball game to her general manager Hisashi Suzuki, but it was rejected. However, her alternative proposal, a tennis game, was accepted. Kumagai and her team learned that simplifying the controls from an initially gimmicky input was the best way to attract varied groups of players. Virtua Tennis was first released in 1999 and was successful enough to spawn a franchise. Kumagai would be involved with subsequent entries in the series and would lead to worldwide home console sales exceeding five million units as of 2017.

During the turn of the millennium, Sega underwent a corporate restructuring and AM3 was rebranded as Hitmaker. In 2002, Kumagai became director and general manager of the studio's planning and producing department. At this time, she contributed to titles like Cyber Troopers Virtual-On Marz and the Avalon no Kagi series. In July 2003, Oguchi was promoted to president of Sega while Kumagai was appointed as head of Hitmaker at the age of 35. This made her the first female president of a Sega studio or any Japanese game studio in history. Kumagai continued her game design and production duties despite her new administrative title. In 2011, Kumagai became interested in entering the increasingly-lucrative mobile game market starting with an iOS and Android rendition of Derby Owners Club. She also produced a project directed at female users with the rhythm game Yumeiro Cast. Kumagai left Sega in 2015 and was hired as an executive producer at Colopl, a company specializing in smartphone games. There, she has overseen updates on their releases Hoshi no Shima no Nyanko, Quiz RPG: The World of Mystic Wiz, and Dragon Project.

== Works ==
Year	Title	Credit(s)
1995	Rail Chase 2	Producer
1996	Gunblade NY	Producer
1996	DecAthlete	Producer
1997	Winter Heat	Producer
1997	The Lost World: Jurassic Park	Producer
1998	Magic Truck Adventure	Director, producer
1999	Virtua Tennis	Producer
1999	Toy Fighter	Producer
2000	Confidential Mission	Director, producer
2000	Derby Owners Club	Producer
2000	Derby Owners Club 2000	Producer
2001	Derby Owners Club World Edition	Producer
2001	Virtua Tennis 2	Producer
2002	Derby Owners Club II	Producer
2003	Cyber Troopers Virtual-On Marz	Producer
2003	Astro Boy: Omega Factor	Producer
2003	Avalon no Kagi	Producer
2004	Derby Owners Club Online	Producer
2005	Avalon no Kagi Ver. 2	Producer
2006	Virtua Tennis 3	Producer
2008	Derby Owners Club 2008: Feel the Rush	Senior producer
2009	Derby Owners Club 2009: Ride for the Live	Senior producer
2011	Virtua Tennis 4	Creative producer
2012	Virtua Tennis Challenge	Creative producer
2015	Yumeiro Cast	Producer
2015	Squads: Saikyou no Kizuna	Creative producer
