= Gunblade NY =

1995 video game

- North American arcade flyer
- Developer: Sega AM3
- Publishers: NA/JP: Sega; EU: Deith Leisure
- Directors: Makoto Yamamoto; Shinichi Ogasawara
- Producer: Mie Kumagai
- Designer: Kiyoshi Miyagi
- Programmer: Kenji Tohma
- Composers: Kentaro Koyama; Naoki Tokiwa
- Platform: Arcade
- Release: NA: December 31, 1995; JP: April 1996; EU: 1996
- Genre: Light gun shooter
- Modes: Single-player, multiplayer
- Arcade system: Sega Model 2B CRX

Gunblade NY is a light gun rail shooter developed by Sega for the Model 2 arcade machine and released in 1995 in North America and 1996 in Japan. The game was re-released alongside its sequel, L.A. Machineguns: Rage of the Machines for the Wii in 2010 as part of the Sega Arcade Hits Pack.

== Gameplay ==
Gunblade NY is a game in which the player must save the city of New York from robotic terrorists who invade the city during a holding of the United Nations General Assembly, taking both world leaders and civilians hostage. An anti-terrorist force known as the National Counter-Terrorism Committee subsequently deploys their operational unit (the Special Air Assault Force) to liberate New York and free the hostages. The player assumes the role of a door gunner aboard a Special Air Assault Force experimental Boeing AH-64 Apache, who controls an M60 machine gun with unlimited ammunition installed on the aircraft's left side to shoot down enemies throughout different areas of the city. The turret is aimed by pivoting a large light gun controller installed on a fulcrum (or with the Wii Remote's infrared sensor in Sega Arcade Hits Pack). As this game is a first-person rail shooter, the player cannot control where the helicopter flies in general and must focus on destroying all enemies in its vicinity and move on to the next area, with the ability to destroy explosive objects to take out multiple foes simultaneously and deal increased damage with headshots. Enemies can attack the turret with rocket launchers, but the player is able to shoot down the rockets to avoid incurring any damage. The player can only take three hits before being put out of action and needing to insert more coins to continue. There are eight levels to complete, divided into two campaigns, one easy and one hard, consisting of four levels each, plus a bonus score attack mode that challenges players to score as much points as possible within a time limit. Most levels end with a boss battle against a large robotic enemy. A second player can join in at any time to assist the first player in cooperative multiplayer, controlling an additional turret installed on the right side of the helicopter, but can only withstand three hits before being put out of commission, like the first player.

== Plot ==
On the morning of July 12, 2005, a robotic terrorist organization known as Bear EX stages an assault in the midst of Times Square. Local police forces who are outgunned by the terrorists, request backup from the Special Air Assault Force, which has a helicopter patrol ship standing by in the lower bay of New York City that responds by dispatching a single attack helicopter with twin gun turrets to battle Bear EX throughout the streets of New York City, which has been evacuated to minimize civilian casualties. The SAAF agents aboard the helicopter begin their mission by clearing Times Square of the first wave of terrorists, then proceed to Midtown Manhattan to destroy an anti-aircraft gun that they emplaced there. As the terrorists have also occupied the UN headquarters, the SAAF agents proceed to spearhead a counterattack to retake the complex. Despite suffering a crushing defeat, however, the terrorist leader escapes to a freighter on the East River, prompting the agents to give chase and subsequently take out the freighter's defenses, including a giant mecha that is presumably piloted by the terrorist leader.

Following their successful effort to retake the UN headquarters, the SAAF resolves to clear out the terrorists from the rest of the city. The agents aboard the SAAF helicopter pursue and attack a convoy of terrorists that's crossing the Brooklyn Bridge and eventually destroy a helicopter that's escorting them. The agents are then alerted of a request for assistance at Battery Park, in which the terrorists have used as a beachhead to support further attacks into the city. Shortly after wiping out the terrorists there, the agents discover a missile TEL and must quickly destroy it before it could launch its payload. The SAAF commander determines that the remaining terrorists are gathering for a counter-attack at Grand Army Plaza and orders the agents to head there and disrupt the gathering as night falls. With their plans foiled, the terrorists then make their last stand in Midtown Manhattan along with their leader (revealing during the earlier freighter battle, his second in command was the one who piloted the giant mecha and died fighting the player), which the agents all destroy to save the city once and for all.

Earlier if the player succeeded in destroying the TEL at Battery Park, a "good" ending will play where the agents then return to the SAAF carrier for a party.

However, if the player failed to destroy the TEL, a "bad" ending will play where the SAAF commander will punch one of the agents because of their failure to stop the missile from causing great damage to the entire city.

== Reception ==
In Japan, Game Machine listed Gunblade NY on their June 1, 1996 issue as being the most-successful dedicated arcade game of the month. Next Generation rated the game four stars out of five, and stated:

Gunblade NY is a good, fun Sega shooter, something gamers have almost come to expect from the Japanese giant. But it's Namco that has set the shooting genre on fire with Time Crisis, and until Virtual Cop 3 appears [...] Gunblade NY may help to lower the flames, but it certainly won't put them out.

Brad Cook of All Game Guide praised the game's graphics and gameplay, while cautioning its difficulty and capability of inducing motion sickness.

== Sequel and port ==
A sequel, L.A. Machineguns: Rage of the Machines (Called Gunblade 2 prior to its release), was released in December 1998. The game is another rail shooter set 20 years after the events of Gunblade NY and follows the efforts of two agents of the Special Independent Force Against Terrorism (SIFAT) riding hoverbikes to defeat the titular Rage of the Machines (ROM), another robotic terrorist organization, across the western United States. The ROM first attack Los Angeles, where the U.S. president is attending an opening ceremony for a newly constructed skyscraper designed to manage and process vast amounts of data from all over the world known as “Delta Othello.” Following the attack on LA, SIFAT are mobilized to combat the threat. The game is similar in play to Gunblade NY, but with differences such as L.A. Machineguns: Rage of the Machines having far more flying based enemies than Gunblade. Machineguns and Gunblade were both ported to the Wii in the two-game compilation Sega Arcade Hits Pack: Gunblade NY & LA Machineguns, which adds online leaderboards, Wii Zapper support and the ability to unlock new firing styles with different tactical advantages. Due to the collapse of the World Trade Center during the September 11 attacks, the World Trade Center towers that appear in Gunblade NY are removed in the Arcade Hits Pack to reflect their absence during the game's setting in the year 2005.
