= Confidential Mission =

2001 video game

- European Dreamcast cover art
- Developer: Hitmaker
- Publisher: Sega
- Director: Mie Kumagai
- Producer: Mie Kumagai
- Designer: Kyoshi Ieizumi
- Programmer: Takeshi Goden
- Composer: Seiichiro Matsumura
- Platforms: Arcade, Dreamcast
- Release: Arcade; 2000; Dreamcast: NA: May 14, 2001; EU: May 25, 2001; JP: June 14, 2001
- Genre: Shooter
- Modes: Single-player, multiplayer
- Arcade system: Sega NAOMI GD-ROM

Confidential Mission (コンフィデンシャル ミッション, Konfidensharu Misshon) is a light gun game published by Sega, first available as an arcade game, then ported to the Dreamcast. The game is in the same style as the Virtua Cop series or The House of the Dead series, with support for one or two players. The game was developed by Sega's Hitmaker development team and first released in 2000. Its plot is of the same vein as James Bond and Mission: Impossible. Despite it also having an arcade release, it never enjoyed the popularity of the Virtua Cop nor The House of the Dead series, which were also produced by Sega.

== Plot ==
A group of terrorists has stolen the World's Coalition's satellite. The Confidential Mission Force (CMF) sends two of its agents, Howard Gibson and Jean Clifford, to investigate. They first infiltrate a museum, where they find out "Agares" is behind the plot of stealing the satellite. As soon as they grab the disc with the information, one of the Agares leaders prevents them from getting the disc. After they retrieve the disc, they are sent to a train traveling through the mountains. There, they find out that Agares has kidnapped satellite programmer Irina Mikhailova and forced her to reprogram the satellite. Howard and Jean manage to rescue Irina but are stopped by the General, whom they eventually defeat in a fierce firefight. With the help of Irina, CMF locates Agares Headquarters, where the satellite control is being transported to a submarine. Howard and Jean manage to make it through the base and find the Agares Ringleader, who plans to use the satellite to destroy the CMF's headquarters. After being defeated, the leader uses a self-destruct sequence on Agares's base and escapes in a submarine. If the player succeeds in the final quick time event, the two agents manage to use the satellite to destroy the submarine and deep-six the Ringleader. Howard and Jean then escape, thus saving the rest of the CMF from being destroyed.

== Gameplay ==
Hitmaker ported this game to the Dreamcast console directly from the arcade. The idea of the mission is to infiltrate enemy headquarters using a combined assortment of weapons and gadgets.

Gameplay using a regular Dreamcast controller moving an on-screen cursor is available.

== Development ==
The game was developed using the Sega NAOMI GD-ROM model arcade board. It was available in the arcades in 4 configurations: Cabinet Deluxe, Sitdown, Normal and Upright.

== Reception ==
Reception

Aggregate score
Aggregator	Score
Metacritic	70/100

Review scores
Publication	Score
AllGame	(ARC) 3.5/5 (DC) 3/5
Edge	6/10
Electronic Gaming Monthly	6.33/10 (Note: Three critics of Electronic Gaming Monthly gave the Dreamcast version each a score of 6.5/10, 5.5/10, and 7/10.)
EP Daily	7/10
Eurogamer	6/10
Famitsu	31/40
Game Informer	5.5/10
GameRevolution	C
GameSpot	5.3/10
GameSpy	8/10
IGN	8.8/10
Next Generation	2/5
Maxim	4/5

The Dreamcast version received "average" reviews according to the review aggregation website Metacritic. Four-Eyed Dragon of GamePro said, "with only House of the Dead 2 and Virtua Cop 2 as the other Dreamcast shooters, Confidential Mission nicely fills the void." (Note: GamePro gave the Dreamcast version 4.5/5 for graphics, 3/5 for sound, 5/5 for control, and 4/5 for fun factor.) However, Jim Preston of NextGen said, "Clearly modeled after the excellent Virtua Cop series, Confidential Mission does nothing to spice up the gameplay, with the same 'justice' and 'combo' shots we've seen before." In Japan, Famitsu gave it a score of 31 out of 40.

Also in Japan, Game Machine listed the arcade version in their January 15, 2001 issue as the second most-successful dedicated arcade game of the month.

== See also ==
- Virtua Cop
- The House of the Dead
