= Derby Owners Club =

1999 video game

- Arcade flyer for the English version of Derby Owners Club
- Developer: Sega-AM3
- Publisher: Sega
- Producers: Hisao Oguchi; Mie Kumagai
- Composers: Mitsuharu Fukuyama; Hiroshi Kawaguchi (2008)
- Platforms: Arcade, PC, iOS, Android
- Release: 1999
- Genre: Horse racing
- Modes: Single-player, multiplayer
- Arcade system: Sega NAOMI, Sega Lindbergh

Derby Owners Club is a horse racing arcade game developed by Sega AM3, known as Hitmaker at the time, and published by Sega. Players are put into the roles of breeder, trainer, jockey, and owner of a thoroughbred racehorse. Statistics are saved on an IC card that can be put into any machine. The first version was released in Japan in 1999 and ran on the NAOMI arcade board.

== Gameplay ==
First time players create a new horse. At first, the parents are chosen, the name of the horse and silks to wear. There are two types of horses, the front runners and the stretch runners, who have different strengths. Front runners are quick out of the gate and strong around turns. Stretch runners are slow at first, but can overtake the rest through sprinting.

The horse can be trained in 10 exercises and then be given a meal. Vegetable salad, camembert cheese or chinese herbal dumplings are chosen, among others. Depending on the horse the meal will have different effects. It is important to retain a good relationship with the horse, as it will show in their behaviour. In the horse races, whip and hold buttons are used to control the speed of the horse, based on their condition. Whipping the horse too much will make it lose confidence in the player. Using the whip at the right time depending on the horse type, is also critical. Based on the horses performance on the race, the players receives virtual prize money and either gives encouragement or derision to the horse. Handicap races are available for out of depth horses, the horses ability will be rated by the prize money they earned. Different tracks, such as ones with dirt, are suited to different horses as well.

After the race is done, the game then asks for another coin to be inserted into the cabinet, in order to continue, or the player can retire the horse in order to breed a second generation foal. A horse's breeding ability is limited.

== Development ==
Horse racing games typically have an image that they might be difficult to play, as some prerequisites were required, but with Derby Owners Club, the goal was to create a game that was easy to understand and play to appeal to a wide range of people at the arcades. A pet simulator aspect was added so that the player can easily get attached to the horse and the game. The cabinet set-up with multiple terminals connected to a big screen was also new, as was the ability to store the players progress on the card.

Usually, arcade games focus on training and races, but the feeding and raising the horse section was new to arcades. This aspect also elevated the community aspect that was crucial to Derby Owners Club.

When the game was ported to PC as Derby Owners Club Online, retaining the community aspect was the most difficult aspect. To retain that, a town was added where the players interact with others with an avatar and do various other activities, similar to an MMORPG.

== Reception ==
The game changed the Japanese arcade market. It charged 300 to 500 yen for a game, but the player could play for over 5 to 10 minutes. According to Sega developer Masaru Kohayakawa: "Although the number of arcade game centers continued to decline into the 2000s, the success of Derby Owners Club helped popularize a new arcade business model focused on high-spending players. Previously, arcade games primarily catered to skilled players who spent little money, as they rarely needed continues. In the 2000s, this shifted toward a market where skilled players also spent heavily. This model anticipated the “80/20 rule” seen in modern mobile games, where a small percentage of users generate most of the revenue, making 2000s arcade games an early precursor to this approach."

It was a new concept, and became successful in American arcades as well. Testing of Derby Owners Club in an arcade in Chicago showed that it had become the most popular machine in the arcade, with a 92% replay rate. While the eight-player Japanese version of the game was released in 1999, the game was reduced to a smaller four-player version due to size issues and released in North America in 2003. Despite initial success, the cabinet was too expensive and the game did not entice casual users which are essential to the western arcade market.

The game sold 850 arcade cabinets in Japan by 2001. It was the highest-grossing dedicated arcade game of 2001 in Japan.

The PC port was shut down in 2006, two years after the release in 2004.

== Versions ==
The game was updated in Japan two times as Derby Owners Club 2000 and Derby Owners Club II in 2001. A localized version called Derby Owners Club: World Edition was released in 2002. A PC port was released in 2004. A sequel was released in 2008, called Derby Owners Club: Feel the Rush and switched the arcade board from the NAOMI to the Lindbergh. This game itself was updated next year with a different subtitle, Ride for the life.

A version was released on iOS and Android in 2012. It was shut down in 2019.

== See also ==
- World Club Champion Football
