= Sega AM3 =

Defunct Japanese video game developer

- Logo used as Hitmaker Co., Ltd.
- Formerly: Sega AM3; (1993-1999); Sega R&D3; (1999-2000); Hitmaker Co., Ltd.; (2000–2004)
- Type: Division
- Industry: Video games
- Founded: 1993; 33 years ago
- Defunct: 2009; 17 years ago
- Fate: Merged with Sega Rosso
- Headquarters: Japan
- Key people: Tetsuya Mizuguchi; Kenji Sasaki; Kenji Kanno; Mie Kumagai
- Owner: Sega

Sega AM Research & Development No. 3, (Note: Japanese: セガ第三AM研究開発部, Hepburn: Sega Daisan Ē Emu Kenkyū Kaihatsu Bu) known as Hitmaker Co., Ltd. (Note: Japanese: 株式会社ヒットメーカー, Hepburn: Kabushiki gaisha Hittomēkā) from 2000 to 2004, was a division of Sega, a Japanese video game company. Established by 1993, AM3 was managed by Hisao Oguchi and developed a number of arcade games for Sega. Series introduced by AM3 include Virtual On, Sega Rally, Crazy Taxi, and Virtua Tennis. AM3's main focus was on arcade games until the release of the Dreamcast. Additionally, developers Tetsuya Mizuguchi and Kenji Sasaki developed Sega Rally Championship with AM3 before departing to form AM Annex, which later split into Sega AM9 and Sega AM5.

In 2000, Sega reorganized its studios into semi-autonomous companies, and AM3 became Hitmaker. The company expanded its development into Dreamcast games and ports, but saw a reduced amount of success in compared to previous years. However Derby Owners Club, World Club Champion Football and The Key of Avalon, proved to be highly successful in the Japanese arcade scene. All of which were made by Hitmaker and used magnetic cards.

Hitmaker was one of the few profitable studios for Sega, which gave Oguchi the opportunity to expand beyond videogames and invest into the darts business. Owing to his work on medal and card related arcade games, Oguchi was promoted within Sega.

Oguchi departed Hitmaker in 2003 to become president of Sega. As part of Oguchi's studio consolidation plan with Sega, Sasaki's Sega Rosso studio was merged into Hitmaker. The next year, Hitmaker was integrated back into Sega. The AM3 designation would continue until 2009 until it was merged into other departments.

== History ==
Hisao Oguchi joined Sega in 1984, when there was only one research and development division for arcade and video games. As part of his earliest work, he worked on project planning for the Master System, and his first game developed was Doki Doki Penguin. He directed Super Derby, Super Monaco GP, Rad Mobile, and Heavyweight Champ. Oguchi worked with Sega AM1 before going to AM3. He was appointed as manager of AM3 one month after it opened.

AM3 opened by April 1993. By May 1993, a new Sonic the Hedgehog arcade project was in development. SegaSonic the Hedgehog was developed by AM3, with assistance from Sonic Team. Over the next four years, AM3 continued to develop new games, such as Sega Rally Championship, Gunblade NY, Manx TT Super Bike, Virtual On: Cyber Troopers, Last Bronx, and Top Skater. In 1995, Sega Rally was described by Next Generation as being potentially superior to the well reviewed Daytona USA. The same magazine described AM3 as a "fledgling" studio, being Sega's newest arcade development department at the time. Director Kenji Sasaki declared that AM3 "wanted to make a racing game that was very different to all the others out there", while producer Tetsuya Mizuguchi highlighted the game's realistic motion cabinet. Mizuguchi and Sasaki later departed AM3 with the team of Sega Rally Championship to develop Sega Touring Car Championship with their new group, AM Annex.

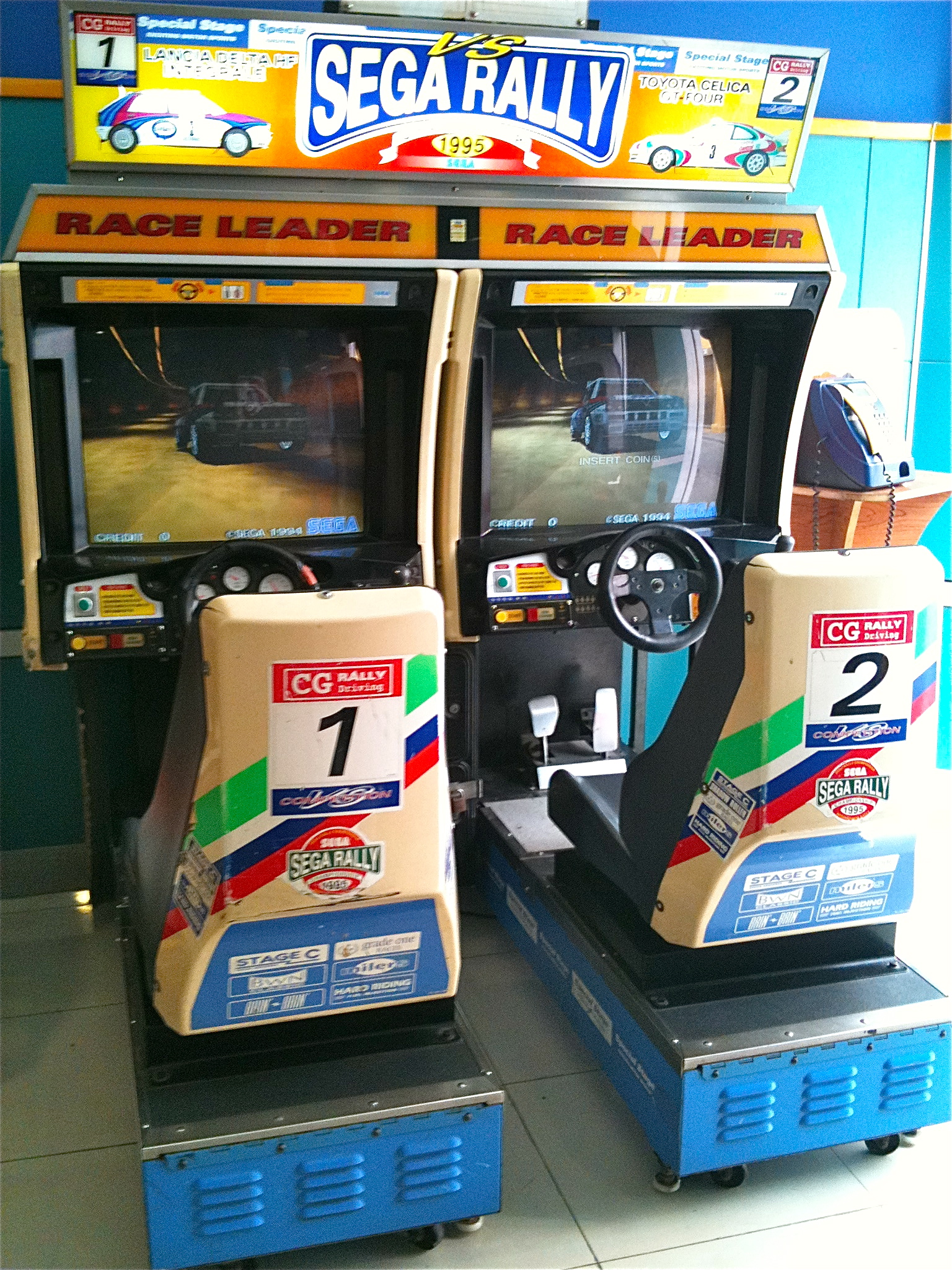
A Sega Rally Championship arcade cabinet

In a 1997 interview, Oguchi stated that the culture at AM3 was that he would not reject or interfere with ideas, although he would make suggestions. He likened the environment to a university laboratory and called it "the AM3 way". Oguchi also addressed AM3's lack of a genre of game in which they specialized, stating that his department's primary objective was to create games that "look interesting", which also meant a focus on arcade games that one would not find on a video game console. AM3 had a fondness for using the Model 2 arcade system board, which was used on Last Bronx and Top Skater even though the former released just a few weeks before AM2's Virtua Fighter 3 on the Model 3. Top Skater was released afterward with a deliberate selection of the Model 2. Of the newer hardware, Oguchi stated that AM3 would work with it, and that he anticipated it would eventually reduce in cost much as the Model 2 had already. Next Generation praised Last Bronx though comparing it to Virtua Fighter 3, stating it showed how AM3 had a "refusal to take a back seat to AM2 or any other R&D department". In 1999, AM3 released Top Skater developer Kenji Kanno's Crazy Taxi for the NAOMI system board. It quickly became a staple game at a number of arcades and received a Dreamcast port, with more than one million copies sold. Another arcade and home release, Virtua Tennis, helped to start a new wave of tennis video games and became one of the Dreamcast's best sellers. Derby Owners Club proved to be highly influential as an arcade game with physical card features.

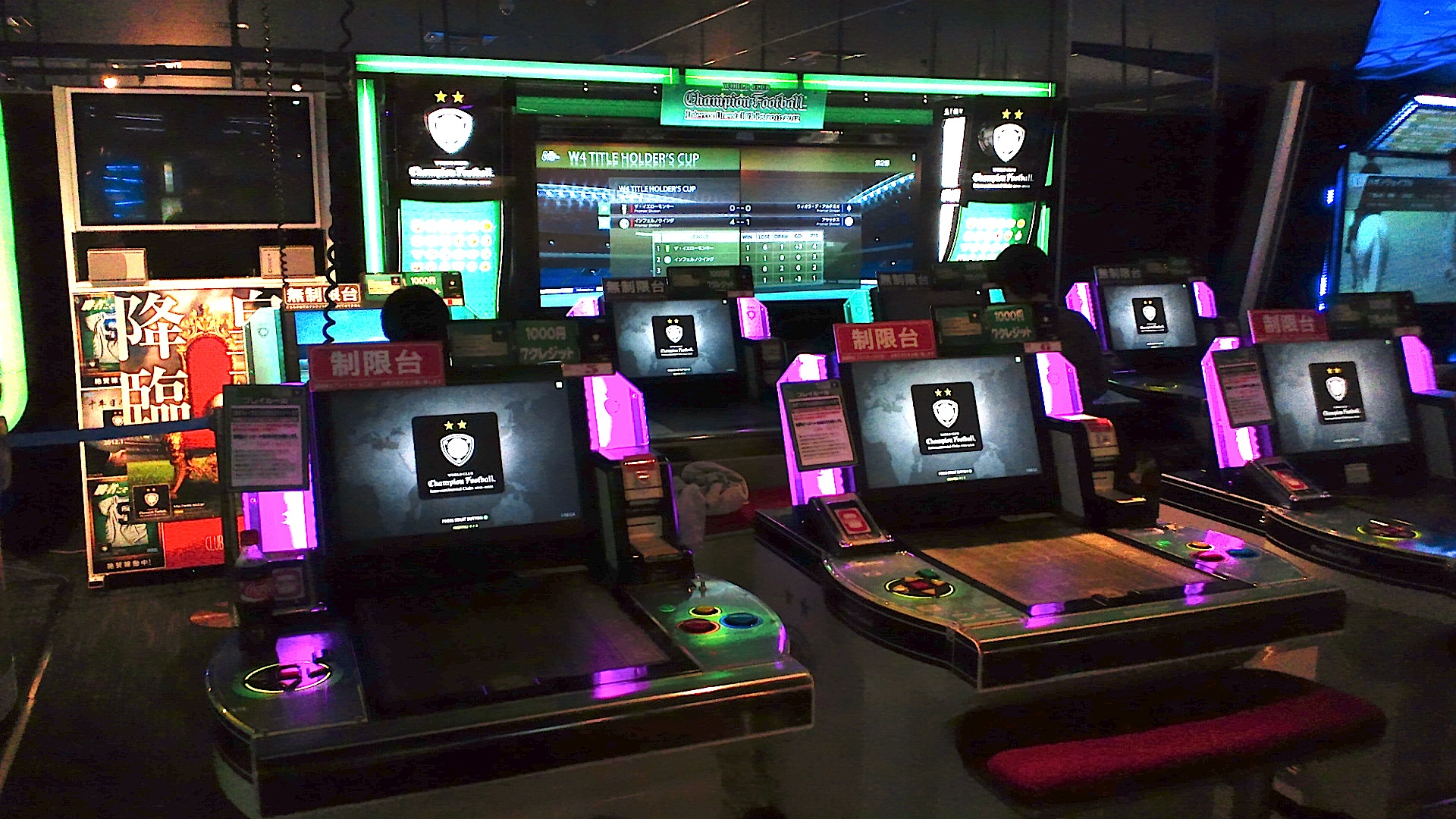
A World Club Champion Football set of cabinets

Sega restructured its arcade and console development teams into nine semi-autonomous studios headed by the company's top designers in 2000. Oguchi chose to name his new company Hitmaker, as "the perfect translation of our image". He expressed a desire to move forward with network gaming and work on new concepts with his staff of 128 employees. The company's official name was Hitmaker Co., Ltd. Into 2001, Hitmaker continued to release arcade and Dreamcast games, including Cyber Troopers Virtual-On Force, Confidential Mission, and Segagaga. Even with these positive releases, Hitmaker was not reaching the level of success they had before. Although in the arcade market Hitmaker built upon the success of Derby Owners Club, with World Club Champion Football and The Key of Avalon which also used physical card features. In 2006, Japanese arcades made record profits based on these types of arcade games. World Club Champion Football has sold 850 million player cards, as of 2016, making it the bestselling arcade digital collectible card game. Sega was considered to be a pioneer of card related video games, which have become very prevalent in mobile games in Japan.

Oguchi was promoted in 2003 alongside Yuji Naka and Toshihiro Nagoshi, based on the success of arcade games that used cards. Due to Hitmaker being one of the few profitable studio of Sega, Oguchi had the freedom to pursue businesses outside of video games, and invested into the darts business. Hitmaker was involved in the establishment of DARTSLIVE Co., Ltd. which produces electronic darts machines, and a darts bar called Bee was opened in Shibuya in 2002.

In 2003, Oguchi was promoted to president of Sega when Hideki Sato stepped down. At the time, Sega had recently announced its first profit in five years. Virtua Tennis producer Mie Kumagai replaced Oguchi as president of Hitmaker, becoming Sega's first female studio head. Oguchi announced his intention to consolidate Sega's studios into "four or five core operations". As part of the consolidation, Hitmaker absorbed Sega Rosso, which worked on the Sega Rally and Initial D Arcade Stage series. Then, in 2004, Sega reintegrated all of its studios into the company, with Hitmaker shutting down its website on July 1. The AM3 designation continued within Sega until April 2009, when the studio was integrated into other departments. According to IGN's Travis Fahs, AM3 was one of Sega's top arcade studios but received little recognition in comparison to AM2. Rob Fahey of Gamesindustry.biz stated that Hitmaker had a strong reputation with consumers and within the industry. Oguchi retrospectively said that while AM2 and Yu Suzuki focused on technical prowess, AM3 differentiated itself through other means with the technical tools provided by AM2.

== Sega Rosso ==
Sega Rosso Ltd.
- Native name: 株式会社セガ・ロッソ
- Formerly: AM Annex (1996–1998); AM12 (1998–1999); Sega AM12 (1999–2000)
- Type: Division
- Industry: Video games
- Founded: 1996; 30 years ago
- Founder: Kenji Sasaki
- Defunct: 2009; 17 years ago
- Fate: Merged with Sega AM3
- Headquarters: Japan

Sega Rosso, (Note: Japanese: セガ・ロッソ, Hepburn: Sega rosso) previously Sega AM12, was a video game development studio headed by Kenji Sasaki, who had served as a designer on Sega Rally Championship. In 1996, producer Tetsuya Mizuguchi met with Hisashi Suzuki, the manager of the R&D division. He and Mizuguchi agreed to create a new department separate from AM3 that would be called AM Annex. Mizuguchi selected the initial team himself, a team of six or seven people that would later grow in number. The first game AM Annex began to develop was Sega Touring Car Championship on the Model 2 arcade board. AM Annex later received the AM8 designation and developed Sega Rally 2 and Star Wars Trilogy Arcade on Sega's Model 3 board.

According to Hisao Oguchi, Mizuguchi and Sasaki had departed AM3 with the team of Sega Rally Championship. AM Annex was rebranded as AM12 by September 1998, and AM5 in 1999. The AM5 designation was previously used for a team that designed large attractions for Sega's arcades and indoor amusement parks. Mizuguchi later chose to leave Sasaki after being granted his own department as CS4, later AM9, and even later United Game Artists. Sasaki became head of AM5, while the AM8 designation went to Sonic Team. As the smallest AM department with a staff between 40 and 50 employees, most of Sasaki's staff came from Namco, where Sasaki himself had a role in the development of the Ridge Racer series. AM5 developed Star Wars: Racer Arcade and released it by July 2000.

When the studios were separated from Sega, Sasaki chose the name "Sega Rosso" to have a "hotter" image than the "cool" blue color of Sega, and he liked the combination of Sega with the Italian word for red. Sega Rosso's next games were NASCAR Arcade and Cosmic Smash. Sasaki expressed a desire to work on both arcade and Dreamcast games, as the arcade industry was struggling. Sega Rosso would also work on the Initial D Arcade Stage series before being merged with Hitmaker in 2003.

== See also ==
- Sega development studios
- Amusement Vision
- Smilebit
- Sonic Team
