= Hisao Oguchi =

Japanese business executive (born 1960)

- Born: 5 March 1960 (age 66); Nagano, Japan
- Education: Chuo University
- Occupations: Former President and CEO of Sega Sammy Creation, Former Director, vice chairman, chief creative officer of Sega Sammy, former president of Sega

Hisao Oguchi (小口 久雄, Oguchi Hisao; born 5 March 1960) is a Japanese business executive. He was director, vice chairman, and chief creative officer of Sega Sammy Holdings Inc. Oguchi originally was president and CEO of Sega. He was president and CEO of Sega Sammy Creation. He is currently a director of UDream, a content production company.

== Career ==
Hisao Oguchi had a fondness of bingo arcade games and wanted to make such an arcade game above all else. Oguchi joined Sega in 1984 and was tasked to develop a game about penguins as they were popular in Japan at that time. The resulting game was Doki Doki Penguin Land which was his first project as a planner. He then developed a number of medal games such as World Derby, World Bingo and Super Derby. He also directed several arcade video games with Super Monaco GP, Heavyweight Champ and Rad Mobile. Oguchi became manager of AM3 in 1993, one month after it opened. He previously worked for AM1. Oguchi stated that the culture at AM3 was that he would not reject or interfere with ideas, although he would make suggestions. He likened the environment to a university laboratory and called it "the AM3 way". Oguchi also addressed AM3's lack of a genre of game in which they specialized, stating that his department's primary objective was to create games that "look interesting", which also meant a focus on arcade games that one would not find on a video game console. He also strived to create only original games, and not to develop any sequels if possible. Various developers became famous under Oguchi, including Tetsuya Mizuguchi, who developed Sega Rally. Derby Owners Club, a representative game of Oguchi, played a crucial role into uplifting Sega's arcade business, as it used cards to save players progress and had a pace that was new to arcades. In 2000, AM3 became Hitmaker, one of the nine companies that Sega established during its restructure in 2000. Hisao Oguchi was named president and CEO of Hitmaker.

Sega's state seemed critical, however even if Sega collapses, Oguchi assured that Hitmaker will continue to exist. He also played a crucial role in allowing Segagaga to continue development which was initially taken as a joke by other Sega management. Oguchi was promoted in 2003 alongside Yuji Naka and Toshihiro Nagoshi, based on the success of arcade games that used cards and medals.

Due to Hitmaker being one of the few profitable studios of Sega, Oguchi had the freedom to pursue businesses outside of video games, and invested into the darts business. Hitmaker was involved in the establishment of DARTSLIVE Co., Ltd. which produces electronic darts machines, and a darts bar called Bee was opened in Shibuya in 2002. Oguchi wanted to widen the entertainment that Sega is engaged with. He was then promoted to president of Sega in 2003. Further executive roles inherited by Oguchi were CEO of Sega Holdings Europe in 2005, Chairman of Sega Holdings USA in 2006, chief creative officer and director of Sammy and Sega Sammy in 2008 and lastly director of Visual Entertainment (now Marza Animation Planet) in 2009. He also was president and CEO of Sega Sammy Creation, a casino company.
