= Sega VR =

Video console peripheral

- Manufacturer: Sega
- Type: Video game accessory
- Generation: Fourth generation
- Released: Cancelled

The Sega VR is an unreleased virtual reality headset developed by Sega in the early 1990s. Planned as an add-on peripheral for the Sega Genesis and only publicly showcased at a number of trade shows and expositions, its release was postponed and later cancelled outright after Sega ran into development issues. At least four in-progress games for the hardware were in development before its cancellation.

The project was largely driven by Sega of America; a more successful, separate, and officially released attempt at a virtual reality headset, the Mega Visor Display, was overseen by Sega's Japanese amusement divisions and United Kingdom-based collaborators Virtuality, and would be used in the VR-1 theme park ride and the Dennou Senki Net Merc arcade game. The similarly titled VR-1 is not to be confused with the Sega VR.

== Features ==
The Sega VR's design was based on an IDEO virtual reality head-mounted display containing LCD screens in the visor and stereo headphones. The headset tracking solution was developed by a small electronics company called Ono-Sendai that had been experimenting with VR headsets. The method employed was only capable of tracking two degrees of freedom but was very inexpensive, costing only around $1 per unit, making it affordable for the consumer market. The device used a magnetometer to detect azimuth relative to the Earth's magnetic field and an optical sensor measuring the refraction of light at the boundary of a gas and fluid to detect tilt.

== Development ==
Sega of America, flush with funds from the success of its Mega Drive/Genesis, announced the peripheral in 1991. It was later seen in 1993 at the Consumer Electronics Show (CES) in Chicago, where it was demonstrated by Alan Hunter and appeared close to a finished product. The event stated that the headset was planned to use the Genesis hardware and would be released in late 1993 at US$200 (equivalent to $440 in 2024) with four confirmed launch games and the possibility of a port of arcade game Virtua Racing. Sega later announced release was slated for early 1994, according to Electronic Games.

The Sega VR headset was never released to the general public and it vanished from release schedules in 1994. There are conflicting reports as to why the product was cancelled. Sega officially claimed to have terminated the project because the virtual reality effect was "too realistic", so users might move while wearing the headset and injure themselves. However, Tom Kalinske, then president and CEO of Sega of America, stated that the system would not be released due to reports of it inducing motion sickness and severe headaches in users. Mark Pesce, who worked on the Sega VR project, says a SRI International conducted research on the product and warned Sega of the "hazards of prolonged use".

== Games ==
Only four original games are known to have been in development.

- Nuclear Rush: A simulation in which users pilot a hovercraft in a futuristic war.
- Iron Hammer: In this helicopter simulation, gamers pilot a flying gunship. The game was distributed without VR support via Sega Channel in July 1996, the rom of which was later discovered by the Video Game History Foundation in 2025.
- Matrix Runner: Reported to be a cyberpunk adventure game inspired by Hideo Kojima's Snatcher.
- Outlaw Racing: A vehicle racing and combat game.

Sega also announced a port of Sega AM2's hit 1992 arcade game Virtua Racing as a launch game for the device, though it is not known how far this reached in development.

== Legacy ==
Following the cancellation of the Sega VR, a few further attempts were made by Sega to develop virtual reality technology. A similar peripheral was reportedly made, but never seen, for the Saturn.

While Sega of America undertook development on the Sega VR, Sega of Japan endeavoured to create their own virtual reality project. Sega entered into an agreement to collaborate with the pioneering Virtuality Group on a VR arcade project in 1993. Following this the two companies entered into negotiations to build a new headset by combining their previous development assets in the field of VR.

The result of the agreement was the Mega Visor Display, publicly released for the first time in July 1994 as part of the VR-1 attraction installed at Sega's flagship Joypolis indoor theme parks in Japan, as well as SegaWorld London and Sega World Sydney. Alongside the attraction, the MVD was praised in reviews at the time for its advancements in ergonomic design and graphical output, and was supposedly not fully matched in performance until the 2010s.

A second project to utilize the Mega Visor Display, the Dennou Senki Net Merc arcade game, was later demonstrated at Japan's 1995 AOU (Amusement Operators Union) show, using the Sega Model 1 arcade system board to produce its 3D graphics. Net Merc subsequently received much more muted reception, with the game's flat-shaded graphics compared unfavourably to the Sega Model 2's textured-filtered graphics when showcased.

== See also ==
- Virtual Boy
- VR-1
