= VR-1 =

Virtual reality amusement park by Sega

- Manufacturer: Sega
- Type: Amusement park attraction
- Generation: Fourth generation
- Released: JP: 20 July 1994; UK: 7 September 1996; AU: 20 March 1997

VR-1 is a virtual reality amusement park attraction released by Sega. Installed publicly for the first time in July 1994 at the opening of the original Joypolis indoor theme park, Yokohama Joypolis, it represented the culmination of Sega's Japanese AM teams and the Virtuality Group's collaborative developments in the field of VR. In 1996 and 1997, respectively, it was also installed at SegaWorld London and Sega World Sydney.

Combining 4 eight seater motion base pods with 32 VR headsets and a 3 minute long first-person rail shooter game, the attraction offered a virtual reality experience believed to be unparalleled in its time. The headset used in the attraction, officially dubbed the "Mega Visor Display", has been retrospectively credited as one of the most advanced head-mounted displays of its generation, not fully matched in performance until the 2010s, and influencing newer attempts.

VR-1 is not to be confused with the similarly titled Sega VR, which, though developed under the same company, was a separate project and headset, ultimately seeing no permanent public use or release.

== History ==
=== Background ===
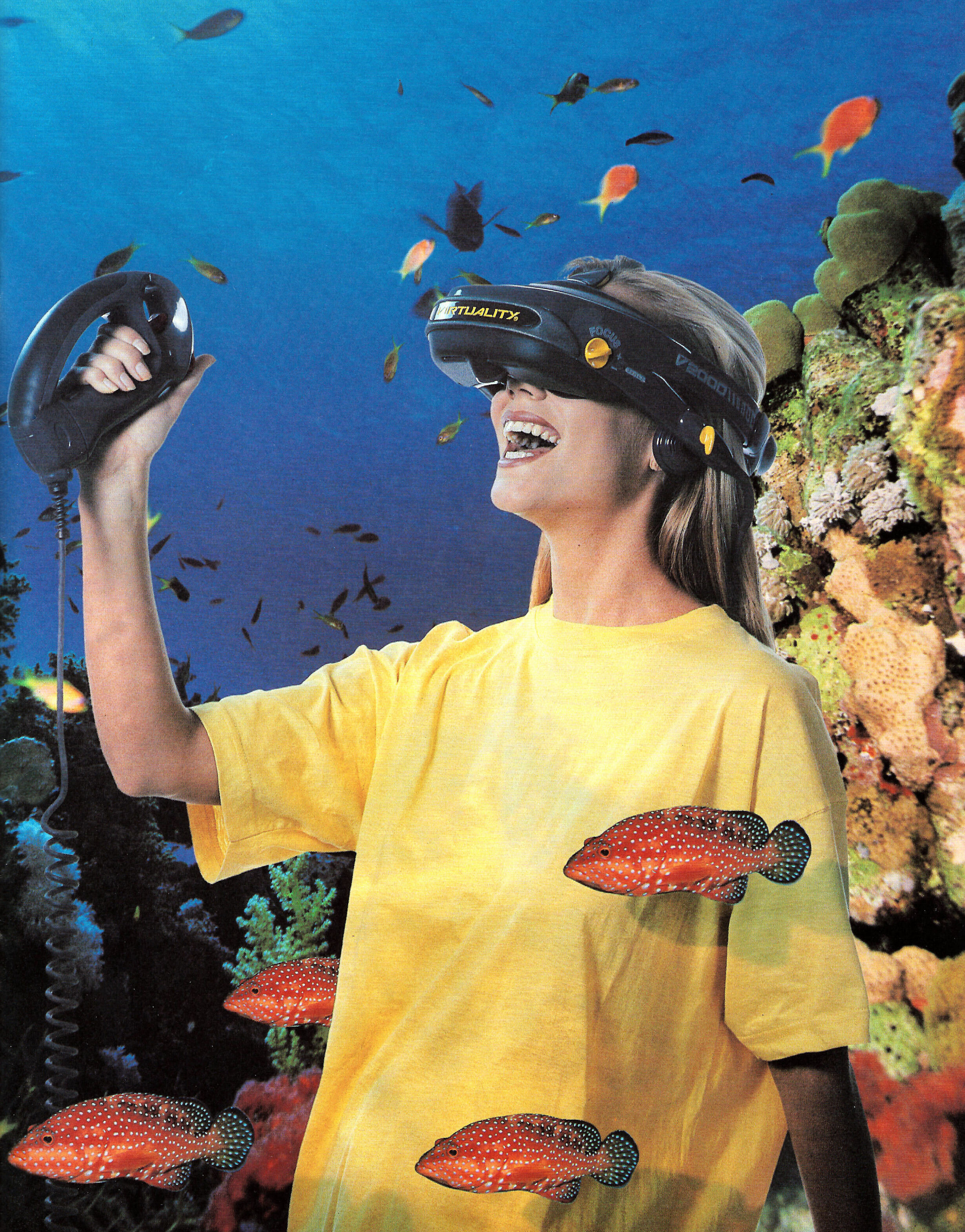
Virtuality saw VR success during the early 1990s.

The first commercial virtual reality craze across the world occurred around the time of the early 1990s. The Virtuality products, developed by W. Industries' Virtuality Group under the leadership of Dr. Jonathan Waldern, were among the most well-known and high-profile examples. Installed at numerous events and entertainment centers, the systems and technology were an enticing concept for arcades, as well as the home console market, however the hardware available to consumers at that time was still very limited - headsets were often large, hulking objects, outputting low resolutions and low frame rate graphics.

During the same time period, Japanese video game companies Sega and Namco had developed a rivalry. Both were competitors as far back as the 1960s, however this relationship had grown through the rise of the "taikan" motion experience games such as OutRun. In 1990, a year in which both made considerable advancements, Sega released the rotational R360 arcade cabinet, which was then significantly outclassed by Namco's Galaxian 3 ride attraction, at that time only available at The International Garden and Greenery Exposition. Though a burden on research and development costs, the attractions received positive feedback from gamers.

Additionally, the two companies were also competing with each other by opening increasingly bigger entertainment facilities in their native countries; Namco again led the way, launching the Plabo venue in Osaka with a downsized version of Galaxian 3 and Virtuality pods in late 1991, and the first theme park ran by a video game company, Wonder Eggs, at the start of the following year, where the original Galaxian 3 installation was permanently relocated. Sega held their own, opening a large number of family-friendly Sega World amusement arcades and announcing plans for their own theme parks across the world. Sega had also shown more interest in creating their own VR hardware, initially with the Sega VR project headed by Sega of America.

=== Development ===
While Sega of America developed the ultimately never released Sega VR project, Sega of Japan sought outside help for their own separate virtual reality endeavours. By July 1993, W. Industries, owners of the Virtuality Group, had won a £3.5 million contract with Sega to work alongside company's "AM" arcade research and development divisions. Jonathan Waldern and Hayao Nakayama were photographed together at the public announcement, making the front page of the Japanese Game Machine coin-op newspaper and marking a notable moment for VR's continued development. At this stage, it was not yet specified which headset would be utilized as part of the agreement.

Virtuality and Sega worked together in the offices of the latter company's AM3 division in Japan, with two programmers (Andy Reece and Stephen Northcott) and two artists from the former relocating there. Whilst undertaking development on the original arcade project, the two teams shared unique optics designs and patented technology, in an attempt to work towards the creation of a headset that would set a benchmark for VR moving forward. Numerous new iterations and versions were developed under tight secrecy to work out which types would work best in terms of ergonomic and graphical quality, some of which based on the advanced Visette. Eventually, the designs were finalized, with the finished product christened the "Mega Visor Display".

Eventually, Sega's official theme park attraction development division, AM5, joined AM3 and Virtuality to create a high-tech theme park attraction for one of the company's first venues in the sector. Developers on VR-1's team included head planner Masao Yoshimoto, sound designer Kazuhiko Nagai, and Shingo Yasumaru. Large amounts of the attraction's hardware relied on pre-existing or near complete concepts, including the Mega Visor Display and 4-axis hydraulic bases used in the earlier AS-1 motion simulator. However, difficulties were supposedly faced in synchronizing the hardware and software; at full capacity, 64 sets of boards were run to accommodate the two eyes of all 32 riders, also making for considerably large manufacturing costs.

=== Release ===
VR-1's first appearance was at Yokohama Joypolis, the first Joypolis indoor theme park, in July 1994. Originally running the Space Mission experience, the ride was one of the premier features sited at the park on its opening day, debuting alongside two other new attractions and providing much of the basis for the park's main selling point of high-tech entertainment. It became one of the more well reviewed aspects; numerous critics noted the Mega Visor Display's slimmed-down size and weight of 640g in comparison to other, more uncomfortable headsets available for public use at that time.

VR-1 was installed at a number of other indoor theme park venues opened by Sega in Japan during the following months. The first installation in Yokohama received an update in September 1995 to run new software under the name of Planet Adventure, though this would be the last official support for it. However, the attraction was installed twice more during 1996 and 1997, with its Space Mission incarnation localized and installed outside of Japan at SegaWorld London and Sega World Sydney. In spite of apparently being prone to breaking down frequently at the locations, it again received positive feedback in reviews.

Sega's attempt at worldwide theme park entertainment had ultimately proven to be uneconomic by the early 2000s in the face of VR-1's acclaim and the satisfactory visitor numbers of some of their parks, with most of the Joypolis branches and two overseas Sega World parks either closed permanently or downsized in the midst of a restructuring in the company. As a result, no VR-1 units remain in operation today, and none are currently believed to exist in any form. At least one Mega Visor Display from the attraction remains at Sega, as well as a promotional booklet.

== Legacy ==
Despite being less widely released and well-known than the R360 and AS-1, the attraction has received acclaim.

The attraction's Mega Visor Display headset has been cited a significant aspect of VR-1, and the headset was considered one of the most advanced of its generation.

The Mega Visor Display was released a second time as part of the Sega Net Merc arcade system in 1995, although its reception was more muted, and the Mega Visor Display has not been utilized by Sega since this release. Rumors claiming that the Mega Visor Display was planned to be used with the arcade game Virtual On: Cyber Troopers exist, but have not been confirmed. The design is incorporated into the original "Virtuaroids" of the first game.
