= CA Sega Joypolis =

Amusement park company

CA Sega Joypolis Ltd.
- Formerly: Sega Live Creation Inc. (2015–2017)
- Company type: Subsidiary
- Industry: Theme parks
- Founded: April 1, 2015; 10 years ago
- Headquarters: Tokyo, Japan
- Area served: Asia
- Key people: Naoya Tsurumi (Chairman); Takeshi Yoshimoto (CEO)
- Number of employees: 56 (2015)
- Parent: CA Cultural Technology Group
- Website: casegajp.com

CA Sega Joypolis Ltd. (Note: CA Sega Joiporisu Kabushikigaisha (Japanese: CAセガジョイポリス株式会社)) (formerly Sega Live Creation Inc.) (Note: Kabushikigaisha Sega Raibu Kurieishon (Japanese: 株式会社セガ・ライブクリエイション)) is a subsidiary of the Chinese company CA Cultural Technology Group Limited, which controls Sega-branded Amusement Parks in Asia, such as Joypolis.

== History ==
The company was originally founded in April 2015, as Sega Sammy Holdings' amusement park division. Ownership of the Joypolis parks transitioned to this new company except for the Okayama branch, which transitioned to the arcade focused Sega Entertainment Co., Ltd.

In July 2015, the company opened a Joypolis in Qingdao, their first venue located outside Japan & Korea.

Sega announced in 2016 that China Animations would acquire a majority stake in Sega Live Creation for 600 million yen, effective January 2017. After the ownership transitioned, China Animations renamed Sega Live Creation to CA Sega Joypolis Ltd, with Sega no-longer fully owning the parks. the 3 Orbi venues remained under the ownership of Sega, and Sega Republic was later closed down after the Sega license expired.

== Current ==
- Tokyo Joypolis
- Joypolis Sports

== Former ==
- Orbi (Ownership transitioned to Sega)
- Orbi Dubai (Ownership transitioned to Sega)
- Qingdao Joypolis (Closed in May 2023)
- Sega Republic (Closed in June 2017)
