= Festivalgate =

Former Japanese amusement park

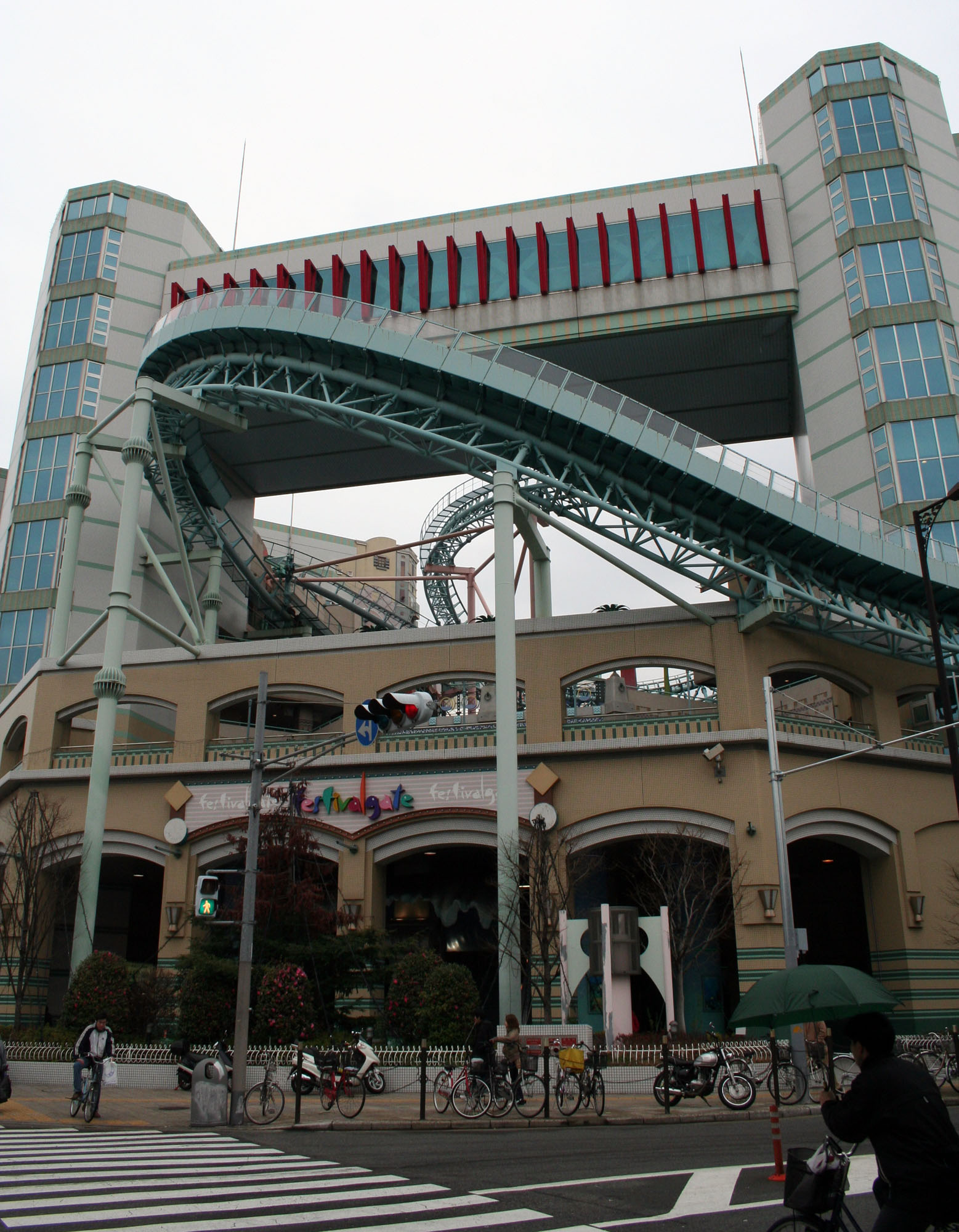
- The entrance to Festival Gate
- Interactive map of Festivalgate
- Location: Osaka, Japan, Osaka Prefecture, Osaka City, Japan
- Coordinates: 34°39′00″N 135°30′17″E
- Status: Defunct
- Opened: 18 July 1997
- Closed: 31 July 2007
- Website: http://www.festivalgate.co.jp (dead)

Festivalgate (Japanese: フェスティバルゲート, Hepburn: Fesutibarugēto) was an amusement park in the Shinsekai district of Naniwa, Osaka, Japan, just beside the Shin-Imamiya Station of the Osaka Loop Line of Nishinihon Japan Railway and Nankai Railway.

Originally the site of a train depot, the park opened in July 1997. The city of Osaka invested in the park, but the theme park was originally managed by a private company which went bankrupt in 2004, and has since been managed by the municipal government of Osaka. In 2007, the local authorities decided to put the property up for sale.

The park was demolished on 19 March 2012. In late 2014, a new building on the site opened containing a Maruhan entertainment center and a Mega Donki outlet.

== Gallery ==
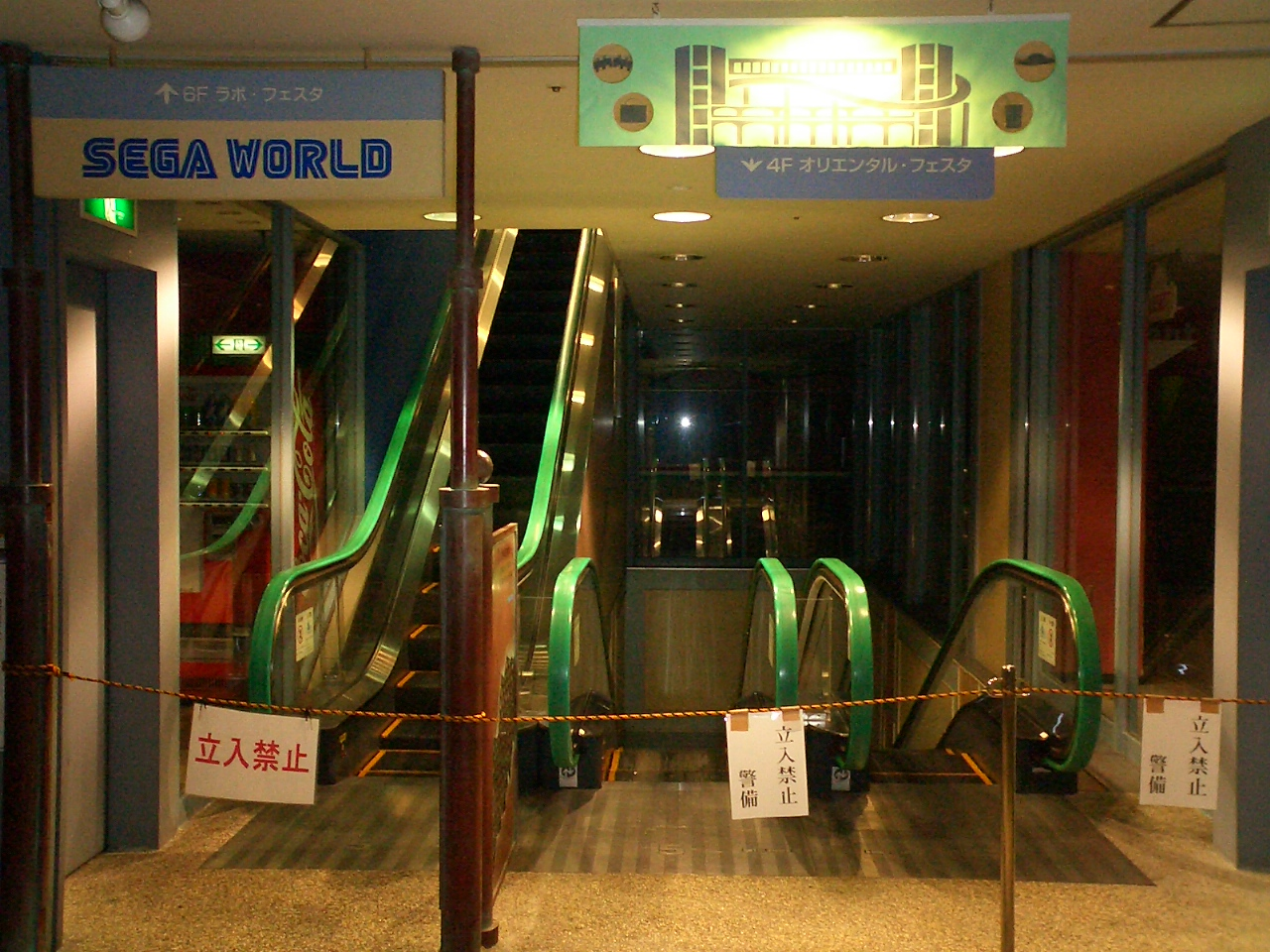
Entrance to the Sega World arcade in Festivalgate (extreme left, unrelated to SegaWorld), October 2004

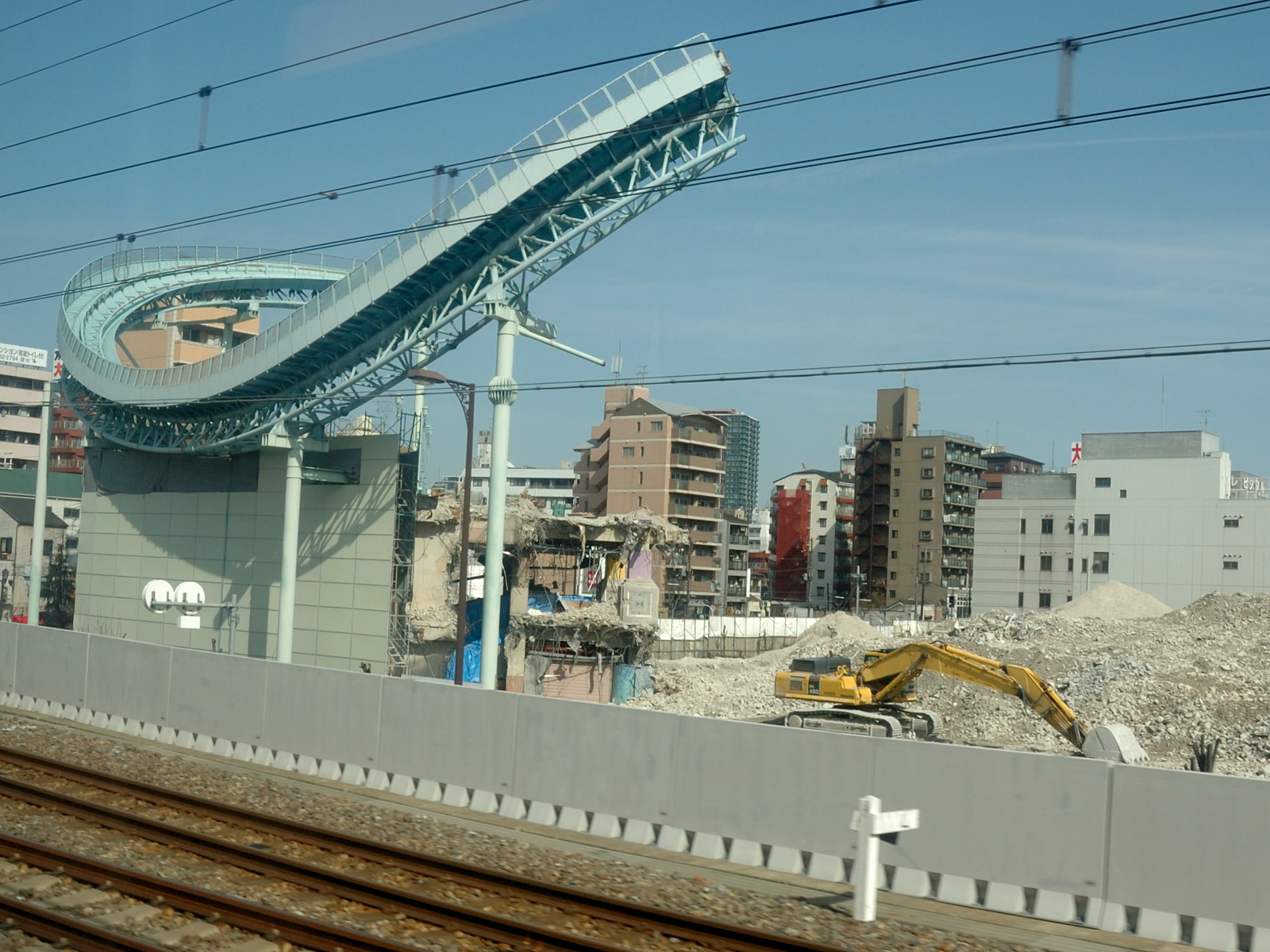
Festivalgate Demolition, 19 March 2012
