= London Trocadero =

Entertainment complex in London

Coordinates: 51°30′36.83″N 0°7′57.86″W

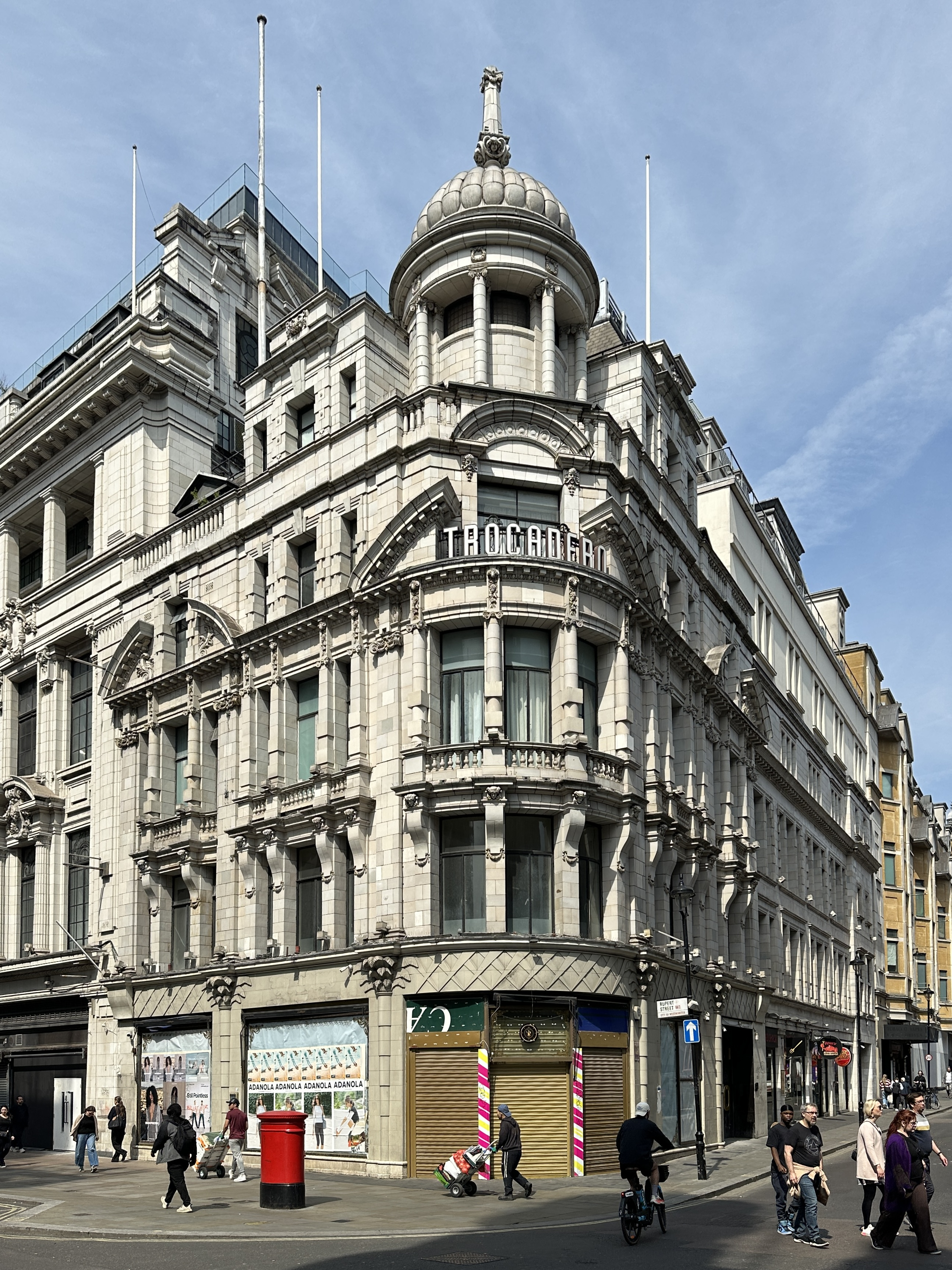
Façade on Coventry Street

The London Trocadero is a former entertainment complex on Coventry Street, with a rear entrance in Shaftesbury Avenue, London. It was originally built in 1896 as a restaurant, which closed in 1965. In 1984, the complex reopened as an exhibition and entertainment space. It became known for the video-game oriented SegaWorld attractions which were added in 1996, and later downscaled and renamed to "Funland" before its closure in 2011. Part of the building was opened as a hotel in 2020.

The complex incorporates separate historic London buildings, including the old London Pavilion Theatre (a former venue for the Palace of Varieties), the New Private Subscription Theatre, the Royal Albion Theatre, the Argyll Subscription Rooms, the Eden Theatre and the Trocadero Restaurant.

The name Trocadero indirectly derives from the Battle of Trocadero in 1823, through the Palais du Trocadéro in Paris, named after the French victory. Since at least 1919, the Trocadero has been abbreviated to the Troc; under that name it appears in a poem by John Betjeman.

== History ==
=== Original venue (1896–1965) ===
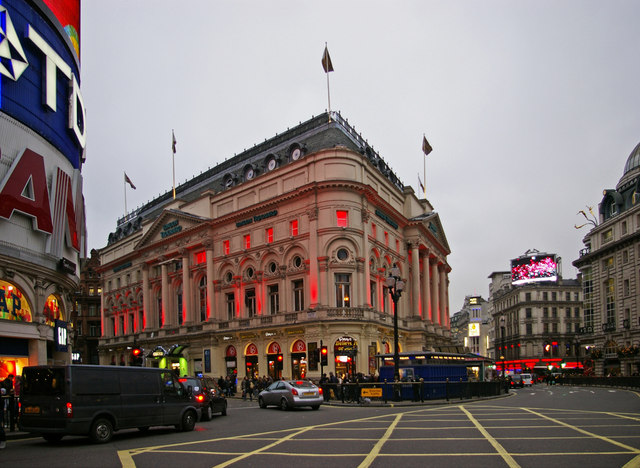
The old London Pavilion Theatre

The Trocadero Restaurant of J. Lyons and Co. opened in 1896 on a site on Coventry Street, near the theatres of the West End, which had been formerly occupied by the Argyll Rooms, where wealthy men hired prostitutes. A one time maître d'hôtel of the Trocadero was French-born Raymond Monbiot, great-grandfather of the journalist and environmentalist George Monbiot.

The new settings were done in an Opera Baroque style, and the various Trocaderos of the English-speaking world have derived their names from this original, the epitome of grand Edwardian catering. Murals on Arthurian themes decorated the grand staircase, and the Long Bar catered to gentlemen only. During World War I, the Trocadero initiated the first "concert tea": tea was served in the Empire Hall, accompanied by a full concert programme. After the war, cabaret was a feature of the Grill Room. The Trocadero closed on 13 February 1965.

=== Relaunched leisure space (1984–1996) ===
In 1984, the Trocadero was redeveloped as a tourist-orientated entertainment, cinema and shopping complex. Providing 450,000 square feet (42,000 m^{2}) of leisure space, it was the largest leisure scheme in the United Kingdom at the time; only being matched 19 years later by the similar sized Xscape development in Castleford.

It retained the external Baroque facade, but gutted the interior and added a Guinness Book of World Records Exhibition. But tenants were limited, and the half-finished development was eventually sold to Burford Group plc, led by Nick Leslau and Nigel Wray. Nickelodeon UK broadcast live from there from 1993 until 1995 when they moved to Rathbone Place.

=== SegaWorld/Funland (1996–2011) ===
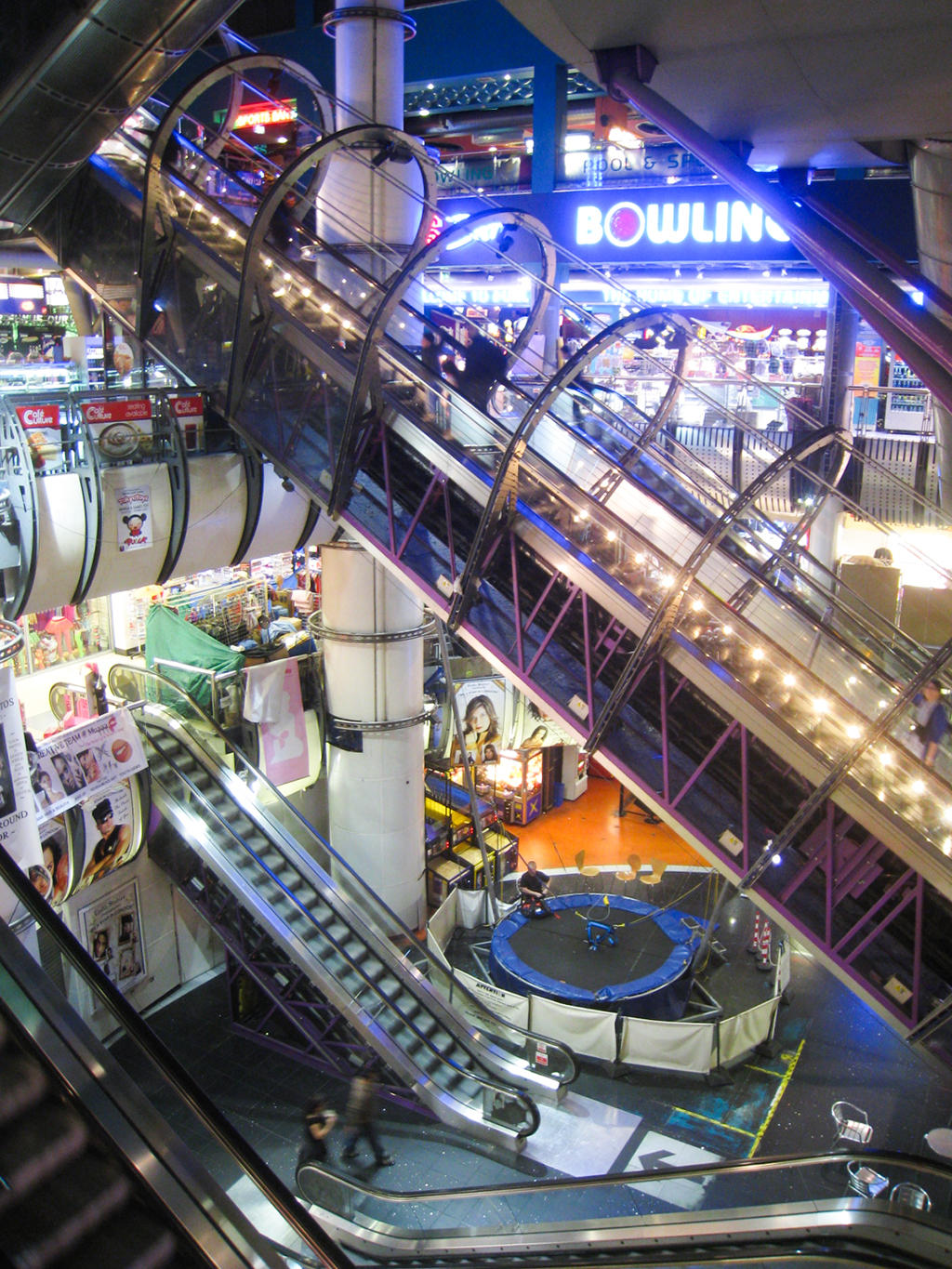
SegaWorld entrance, 2009

The Trocadero Centre received a boost in the late 1990s with the addition of sponsorship from Pepsi, and Sega as an anchor tenant. The launch of SegaWorld London, an indoor theme park occurred on 7 September 1996, which included a large statue of Sonic the Hedgehog over the front entrance. Pepsi sponsored The Pepsi Max Drop and from 1997 the Pepsi IMAX cinema, the first 3D IMAX cinema in the UK. It was also home to the second series of Channel 4's daily reality show The Salon.

However, resultant visitor numbers were poor, and the Guinness Records exhibition closed in the mid-1990s. Following the loss of Sega's sponsorship in 1999, Segaworld became Funland, named after the original arcade that had operated in the building since 1990, and was subsequently reduced in size. The Pepsi-sponsored IMAX cinema closed in March 2000 shortly after the newer London IMAX opened on the South Bank, and the Drop Ride closed around the same time (the Drop Ride was relocated to Funland in Hayling Island, which has no relation to Funland in the Trocadero beyond the name).

Remains of old attractions could still be seen around the centre, such as a wall with a gun-barrel motif that used to house the James Bond: License to Thrill ride. The top floors were kept open until autumn 2002, when they were closed and the disused escalator was blocked off with a drinks machine. This was the original entrance to Segaworld when Funland occupied the lower floors. In October 2005, the centre was used as a backdrop for the final scenes of Madonna's "Hung Up" video.

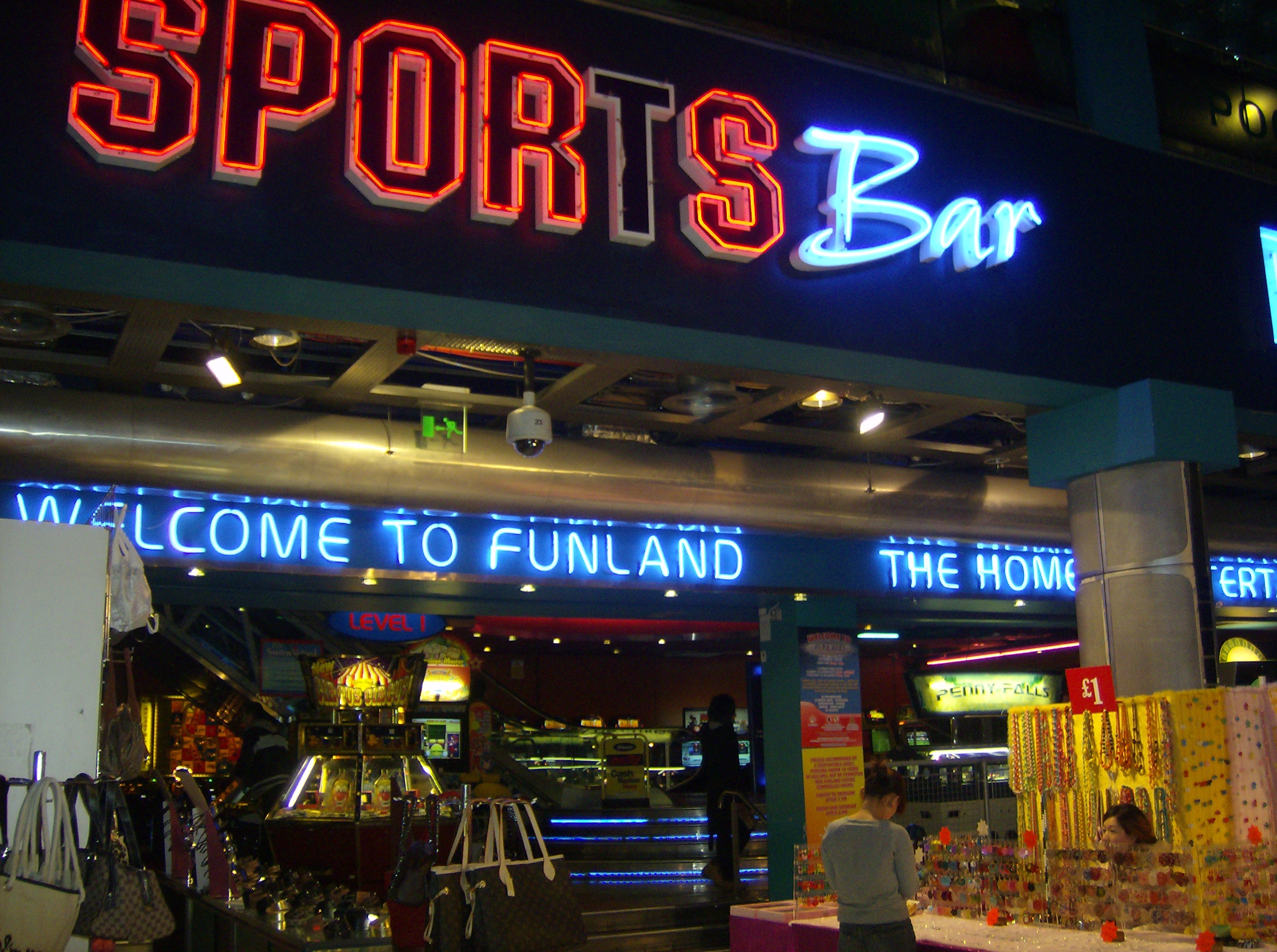
Entrance to Funland, November 2007

Criterion Capital acquired the Trocadero in 2005, and unveiled plans to comprehensively redevelop the site while retaining the listed facade. In 2009, a plan to build a pod hotel with 500 budget rooms inside the building was announced. The 'rocket' escalator was removed in May 2011, and what remained of Funland closed in July 2011.

=== Redevelopment plans (2012–present) ===
A new plan for a 583-bedroom hotel including "pod rooms", apartments, shops and a rooftop bar was approved by Westminster City Council in August 2012. In March 2014, Criterion announced plans to open a TK Maxx in the centre, 5 years after it was blocked by the Crown Estate.

The locked entrance and a handful of left-over arcade games and attractions remained in a much quieter, emptier Trocadero centre with spaces at basement level for street dancers. Despite some online articles indicating that the venue would permanently close on 25 February 2014, only a few areas were removed and others remained open while renovation and plans to build the hotel continued. The Cineworld cinema closed on 21 September 2014 and was replaced by a new Picturehouse cinema called Picturehouse Central, which opened on 19 June 2015.

Plans were submitted in May 2020 to develop parts of the building's basement into a mosque but were later withdrawn in the wake of comments from the public voicing concerns over increased traffic and a place of worship being incongruous with the area's reputation for nightlife. After further delays and changes of plan, Criterion opened the hotel in 2020: the Zedwell Piccadilly has 728 windowless rooms and a large rooftop bar.

In 2023, Asif Aziz's plan to convert a part of it into a mosque was approved by the Westminster City Council's planning committee. According to the plans, the site will also hold 'interfaith meetings'. The site will be able to hold 250 worshippers in the lower basement area and 140 in the upper one, for a total capacity of 390, which is far lower than the capacity of the plan proposed originally. Some critics have expressed concern over the mosque's location near various nightlife establishments.

In October 2025 it was announced that Westminster City Council had granted planning permission for a £40 million refurbishment that would create a casino and leisure centre within the building, with an entrance at 13 Coventry Street. The project proposed by Genting UK will redevelop 37,000 square feet of the interior, including the vacant restaurant space on the first floor previously occupied by Bubba Gump and the vacant former nightclub, Opium, in the basement. The complex will cater for 1,250 customers and create 350 new jobs in hospitality for Londoners, from entry-level to management.

== See also ==
- Scott's (restaurant)
