= SegaWorld London =

Defunct indoor theme park

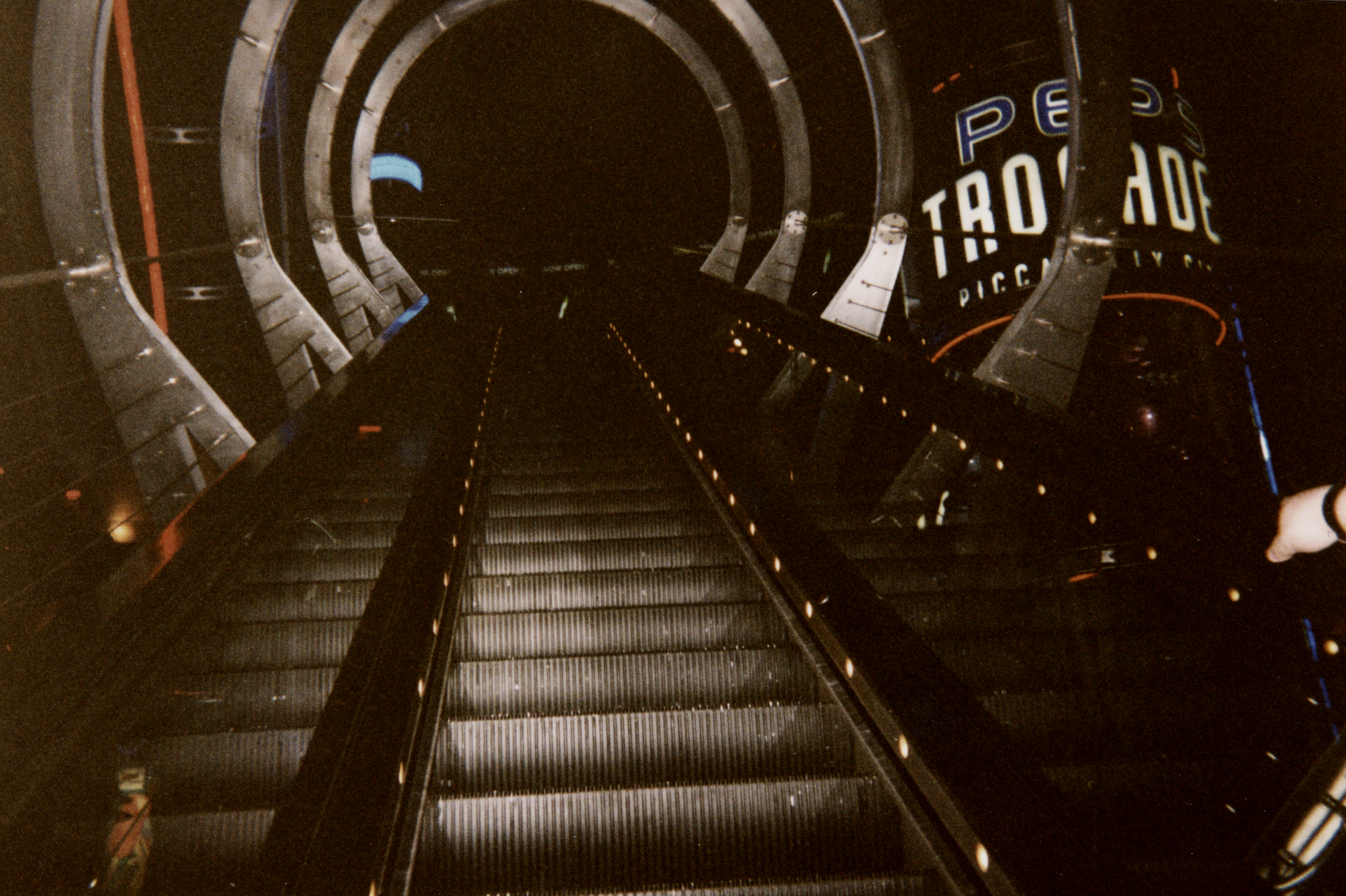
- Interactive map of SegaWorld London
- Location: The Trocadero, Piccadilly Circus, London, England
- Coordinates: 51.511°N 0.133°W
- Status: Defunct
- Opened: 7 September 1996
- Closed: 7 September 1999
- Owner: Chorion; Sega
- Slogan: "Try telling your brain it's not real"

Attractions
- Total: 7

SegaWorld London was an indoor theme park located inside the London Trocadero in London, England. The venue opened in September 1996 and operated as a joint-venture between Chorion, then-owners of the Trocadero, and Sega. At 110,000 square feet, it was Sega's flagship location in Europe, became the first Sega theme park outside of Japan, and was claimed to be the largest indoor theme park in the world. The park was short-lived, lasting only three years in operation following poor reviews from launch and sustained business model management issues.

== History ==
=== Development ===
During the early 1990s, Sega grew exponentially, as a result of a successful reinvigoration of their once-fledgling Sega Mega Drive home console in North America and Europe, and the popularity of their cartoon mascot, Sonic the Hedgehog. Additionally, an initially lucrative stream of income had been created by the openings of a number of family-oriented amusement facilities under the name of Sega World, as part of an ongoing initiative by the company to clean up arcades. Starting out in Japan, Sega Worlds eventually appeared in other countries, including the United Kingdom, after the buyout of UK arcade machine business Deith Leisure by Sega's European management. At the same time, the London Trocadero complex, relaunched the previous decade as a shopping centre, was looking for profitable long-term tenants to occupy its upper floors, and receiving a boost from its existing video gaming facilities on the lower floors, including the popular Funland amusement arcade, which opened in 1990 and was expanded in 1991.

The Trocadero was originally reported to be planned as the site for a smaller scale Sega amusement venue, scheduled to open shortly after the launch of the UK's then-flagship Sega World centre in Bournemouth in July 1993. These plans were scrapped, with Sega instead opening venues in other London locations, such as Colindale's Oriental City shopping centre (formerly Yaohan Plaza) in the following months. However, by January 1995, a new deal had been reached, with Trocadero and Burford Group owner Nick Leslau to create a venue under Sega's "Amusement Theme Park" concept, which launched the previous year in Japan with the openings of Osaka ATC Galbo at the Asian Trade Center in Osaka, and the first Joypolis indoor theme park in Shin-Yamashita, Yokohama. The park would feature most of the same interactive attractions released in Japan during the previous years and developed by Sega's AM5 division, including the AS-1 motion simulator.

Construction began on SegaWorld London in late 1995. Proposed to use 100,000 square feet across the seven unused floors of the Trocadero building, it instigated a large-scale refurbishment of the central shopping atrium itself in the process. At least £45 million was revealed to have been spent on the park's creation, with Sega appointing numerous firms such as Tibbats Associates and RTKL for its design. Anticipation for the opening was covered in a number of gaming magazines; Sega staged a number of press events centred around the final construction stages of the centre from April to August 1996. A high-level sponsorship deal was made with Pepsi to sponsor the Trocadero in the weeks leading up to opening, though this did not benefit Sega directly.

=== Opening ===
Initially slated for a Summer 1996 opening, SegaWorld London eventually opened to the public on 7 September 1996, after a private press party event held at the end of the previous month. Launched in the midst of a £1.5 million advertising campaign created by Mustoe Merriman and Motive, the openings were attended by several celebrities, including singer Robbie Williams, television and radio presenter Anneka Rice, and Pulp frontman Jarvis Cocker among others, and covered by numerous magazines and television programmes, with T3 and the BBC's Newsround among them. The day following the public opening, a second press party was held for attendees at the ECTS 1996, which also included the UK launch of Sega's video game Nights into Dreams. The three launches, particularly the public opening, did not go according to plan. Although positive comments were made towards the park's large "Rocket Escalator", the variety of coin-operated arcade machines on offer, and the advanced VR-1 attraction, reception for most other aspects of it was negative. Common problems cited included overly long queue lines (despite Sega stating they would not occur), overpriced entry fees, and a lack of enthusiasm for the supposed "futuractive" attractions on offer - several reviewers noted that one ride in particular, Beast In Darkness, was little more than a haunted house/ghost train ride with no interactivity, nor did any utilise Sega's portfolio of popular intellectual properties in spite of the heavy usage of the Sonic the Hedgehog mascot character.

Due to the poor reviews, mismanaged crowd control, and general state of disappointment over what was initially promised by Sega, the opening of SegaWorld London was largely regarded as a PR disaster, denting the brand's reputation at the time in the United Kingdom and setting an unfortunate precedent for the venue, as well as future endeavours. Subsequently, Sega would open only one more indoor theme park location outside of Japan during the 1990s, Sega World Sydney in Australia, despite touted plans for over 100 locations across the world by the end of the decade under their Amusement Theme Park concept. Others were earmarked but ultimately never realised for a number of other European locations, including Paris.

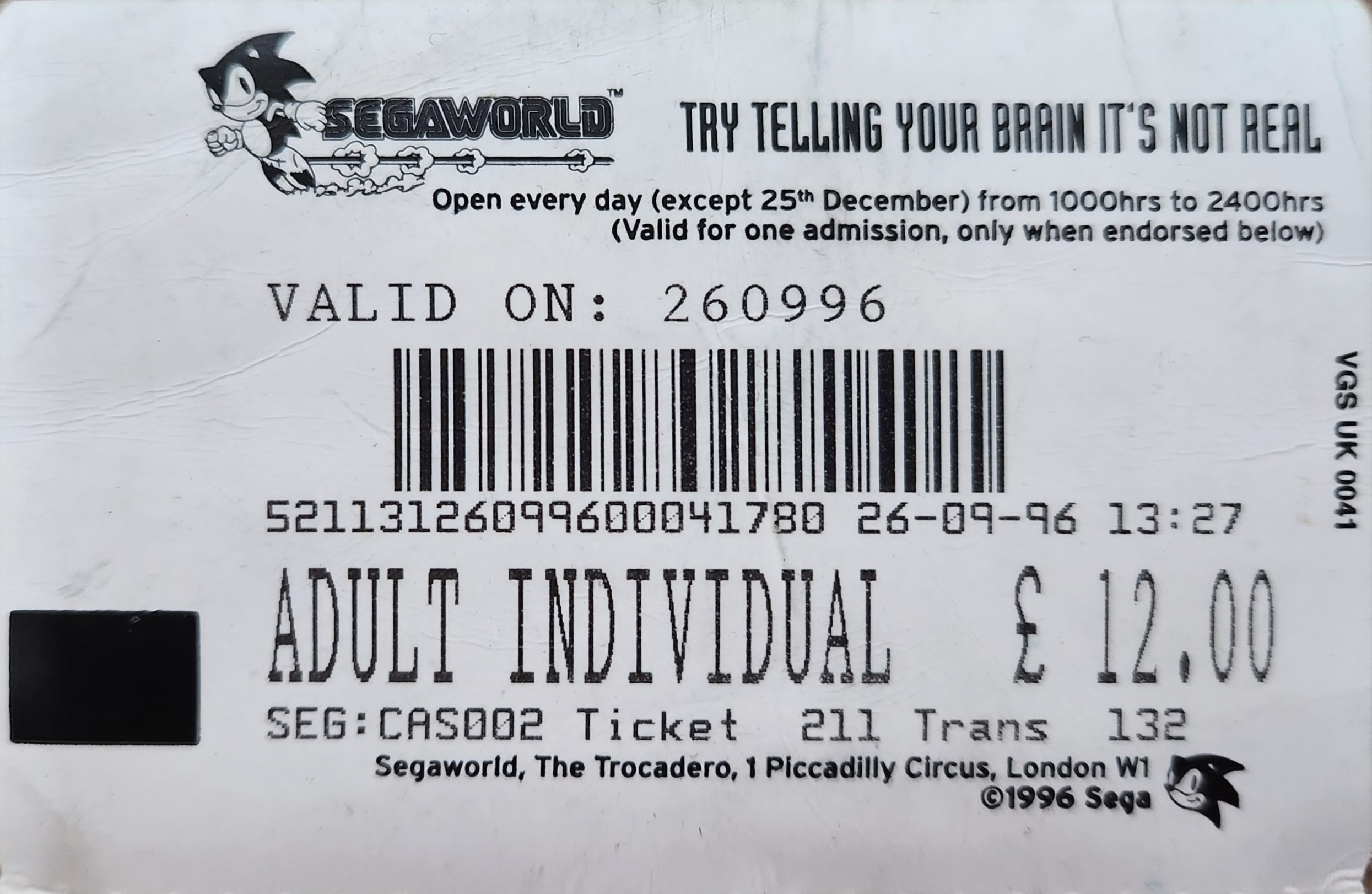

=== Decline and closure ===
In response to criticisms raised concerning the culminative cost of a visit in numerous reviews, Sega initially put the majority of the SegaWorld's arcade machines on freeplay in the weeks after opening. However, this model was not profitable, with much of the park's floor space devoted to the cabinets. By the end of the year, admission fees had been cut down from £12 and £10 to £2, taking the arcade machines off freeplay and establishing ticket payments for the park's seven attractions as a result. These did little to turn fortunes around, and by the time the first full year of operations had been completed, its 1.75 million visitor target had not been achieved, with a £1 million loss from running the facility recorded. Difficulties were also faced in maintaining rides; a number were reported to have broken down in the weeks following the opening.

Further restructuring was required for SegaWorld to run unproblematically, and in December 1997, all admission fees were removed from the park, effectively rendering it a large-scale amusement arcade with rides. Though this improved attendance numbers considerably, with an estimated 4 million visitors in 1998, it did not mean a profit was being made off of the park; indeed, an operating loss of £2 million was recorded during the same year. Other strains on the centre included vandalism concerns, internal distaste for the park's perceived poor working standards, and its proximity to other London amusement arcades more popular with regular visitors, such as Namco's Wonder Park facility on Great Windmill Street.

Though new Sega arcade releases were consistently location tested and installed exclusively at the venue as a result of its flagship status, few new attractions were installed after the opening. A new 3D IMAX cinema and drop tower ride sponsored by Pepsi had renewed tourist interest in the London Trocadero, but, like the original sponsorship deal, did not benefit SegaWorld directly. As part of the original agreements drawn up to create SegaWorld in 1995, Sega were reported to be contractually bound to pull out of running the facility if a £3 million profit had not been recorded exactly three years after opening. This was ultimately not achieved, and on 7 September 1999, Sega officially announced that they would be pulling out of the SegaWorld joint venture with Chorion; the space it occupied was immediately sub-let to Family Leisure, the operators of Funland, in the same venue. Family Leisure was established by one of Sega's original founders, Marty Bromley.

== Operations ==
Taking up seven floors of the London Trocadero building when launched, SegaWorld London was officially billed as an indoor theme park. Its further six attractions and themes backed this up, however unlike a typical theme park, these were not unified under a single concept. In addition, much of the park's attraction was its selection of 400+ coin-operated arcade machines, spread out across 6 of the floors and placed in a uniform manner, generally in keeping with a floor's theme. Due to its status as a flagship Sega facility, SegaWorld also received numerous pre-release arcade games on location test, as well as rarely seen Japanese import cabinets such as Dennou Senki Net Merc and SegaSonic the Hedgehog.

=== Layout ===
After entering the Trocadero through its shopping arcade entrance, visitors embarked up the venue's "Rocket Escalator" (Europe's largest above-ground escalator) sited in the middle of the main atrium to access the 7 SegaWorld floors. These would then be navigated through a further series of escalators and travelators, working their way back down to the main atrium of the Trocadero.

- Reception - The park's welcoming area, containing information desks, a cloak room, and photo opportunity areas with large statues of the Sonic the Hedgehog mascot character, as well as the entrance for the first attraction, Beast In Darkness.
- Combat Zone - Modelled more on a dimly-lit conventional video arcade, with over 50 action games and no attractions.
- Race Track - Themed around racing, featuring over 70 driving games and the Aqua Planet attraction. One of Damon Hill's FW15C cars from the 1993 Formula One season was also sited as a photo opportunity.
- Flight Deck - Over 20 air combat games (including a Sega R360) and the VR-1: Space Mission attraction, with aviation-themed décor and a decommissioned RAF Harrier jump jet hung from its ceiling.
- The Carnival - A brightly lit arena with over 80 arcade machines, generally prize redemption. Also housed the Segakids area for children, an on-site McDonald's outlet, and the Ghost Hunt attraction.
- Sports Arena - Mad Bazooka and AS-1 attractions contrasted the floor's sporting theme, illustrated with over 90 sports games and a large surfing Sonic the Hedgehog statue.

A second McDonald's outlet and the on-site Sega Shop were sited directly opposite the exit escalator into the main Trocadero atrium; the latter is believed to have later been moved to the Sports Arena.

=== Attractions ===
Though there was no unified theme in SegaWorld, much of its main allure was its pretences of offering "futuractive" rides with interactive elements.

Name	Opened	Description
Aqua Planet	1996	Simulates an interactive underwater shoot 'em up battle through 3D glasses, hydraulically driven seats, and two buttons. Known as Aqua Nova at other Sega venues.
AS-1	1996	Two motion simulator pods running semi-interactive ridefilms, including Scramble Training and Megalopolis.
Beast In Darkness	1996	A standard haunted house/ghost train type ride, making use of projection screens and live actors.
Ghost Hunt	1996	An interactive ghost train ride, tasking riders to shoot 3D ghosts projected onto a transparent concave screen with two mounted gun yokes. Known as Ghost Hunters at other Sega venues.
Mad Bazooka	1996	A modified bumper car arena, making use of shooting elements by equipping the carts with turrets, targets, and the ability to collect and then shoot coloured foam balls placed on the floor at each other.
VR-1: Space Mission	1996	Utilises four hydraulic eight-seater pods and the Mega Visor Display headset developed by Sega AM3, AM4 and AM5 with Virtuality Group to offer an advanced virtual reality experience to riders.

== Legacy ==
SegaWorld London remains one of the largest amusement facilities developed under Sega to date. Though its perceived failure can be viewed as emblematic of wider problems within the company and the late 1990s decline of the arcade industry, it has been looked back on favourably by many visitors and has been the subject of numerous reflective works, including videos and articles by The Guardian, Time Out, Digitiser and fans.

Sega's removal from the venue and subsequent sub-let handover to Family Leisure, owners of the pre-existing Funland arcade at the Trocadero, saw the former SegaWorld floors co-joined and redeveloped with it to become a large family entertainment centre under the Funland name. This led to it becoming one of the first central locations for the city's rhythm game scene during the 2000s, which dispersed and continued after Funland's own 2011 closure. As of 2024, several of the former SegaWorld and Funland floors are now home to a Zedwell hotel, occupying much of the Trocadero complex.

The original Sonic statue from the location's reception was moved to a storage facility run by London-based architecture company Proun after its closure. The statue's existence was first rediscovered in 2019, and following involvement from fans alongside Sega Europe, was later restored by film prop effects and makeup firm 13 Finger FX to become a standing feature in their Brentford, London headquarters. The announcement of the restoration's completion was made on 21 August 2023, with Sega's booths at games industry events such as Gamescom also featuring the statue in subsequent months.

Sega Amusements International president Paul Williams began his career under Sega at SegaWorld as its general marketing manager in 1997. In 2022, Williams led the company back into large-scale amusement operations with the acquisition of the FunBox arcades housed within Gravity Max venues. The company opened a new urban theme park location in Stratford, London during 2024, claimed to feature "London's largest arcade".

== See also ==
- Joypolis
- Sega World Sydney
- GameWorks
- London Trocadero
- Namco Funscape
