= Joypolis =

Indoor amusement park chain

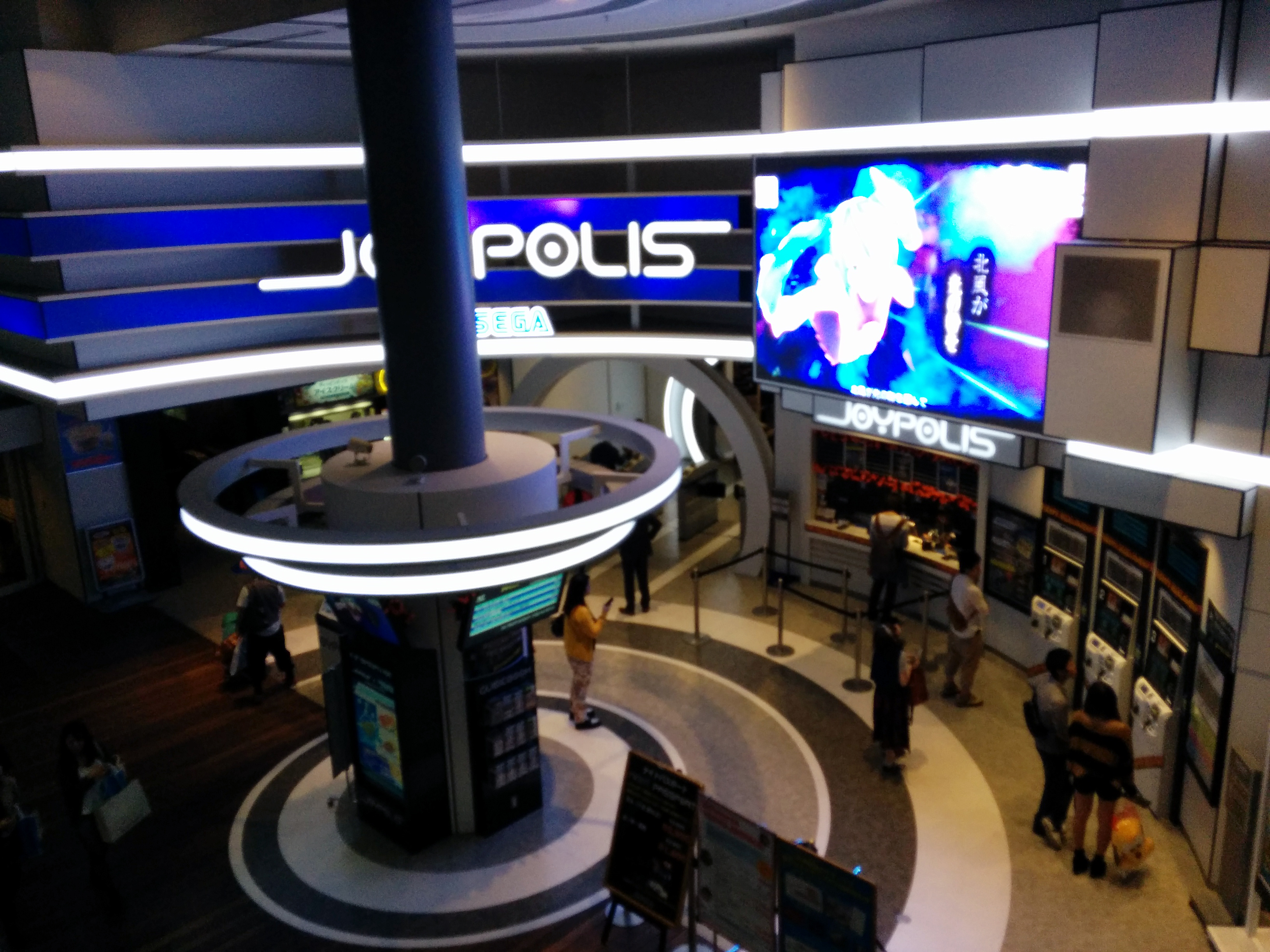
- Entrance to Tokyo Joypolis in September 2014, located in Odaiba
- Interactive map of Joypolis
- Location: Various
- Coordinates: 35.628508°N 139.775161°E
- Status: Operating
- Operated by: CA Sega Joypolis (Tokyo and Sendai); China Animations Character Co. (Shanghai and Guangzhou)
- Theme: Future, video games, anime
- Operating season: Year-round (indoor)

Attractions
- Total: 22 (Tokyo)
- Roller coasters: One (Tokyo only, formerly Shanghai)

Joypolis (Japanese: ジョイポリス) is a chain of indoor amusement parks created by Sega and run by CA Sega Joypolis. Beginning on July 20, 1994 with the original location sited in Yokohama, Japan, Joypolis centers have since opened in several cities in Japan and later China. The parks feature arcade games and amusement rides based on Sega's intellectual properties, original themes, and licensed franchises. Alongside the predecessor Galbo venues and the overseas spin-offs SegaWorld London and Sega World Sydney, they were officially referred to under the "Amusement Theme Park" or "ATP" concept by Sega in the 1990s.

Overall, eleven Joypolis theme parks have been opened, but as of 2024, four parks remain operational; two in Japan (Tokyo and a Sports Center in Sendai) and two in China (Shanghai and Guangzhou); the failure of many of the parks has largely been attributed to poor visitor numbers, managerial problems, and cost-cutting measures, with the closures and downsizing of several occurring in the midst of Sega's companywide losses during the early 2000s.

After its formation the previous year to operate the parks, Sega announced in 2016 that China Animations would acquire a majority stake in Sega Live Creation (now CA Sega Joypolis) for 600 million yen, effective January 2017. The two currently operating Joypolis branches are no longer fully controlled by Sega, although their attractions, branding, and intellectual properties continue to be used under license from them for the foreseeable future.

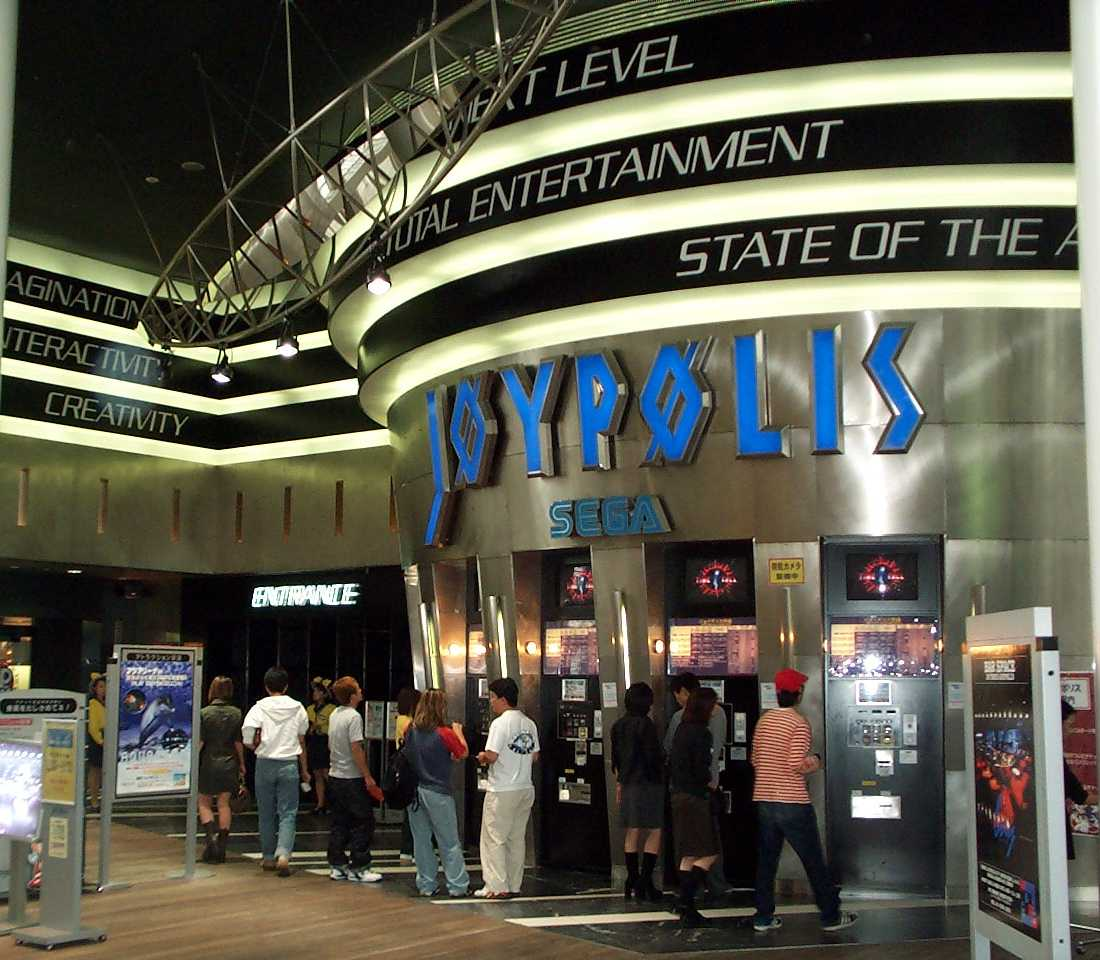
Original entrance to Tokyo Joypolis

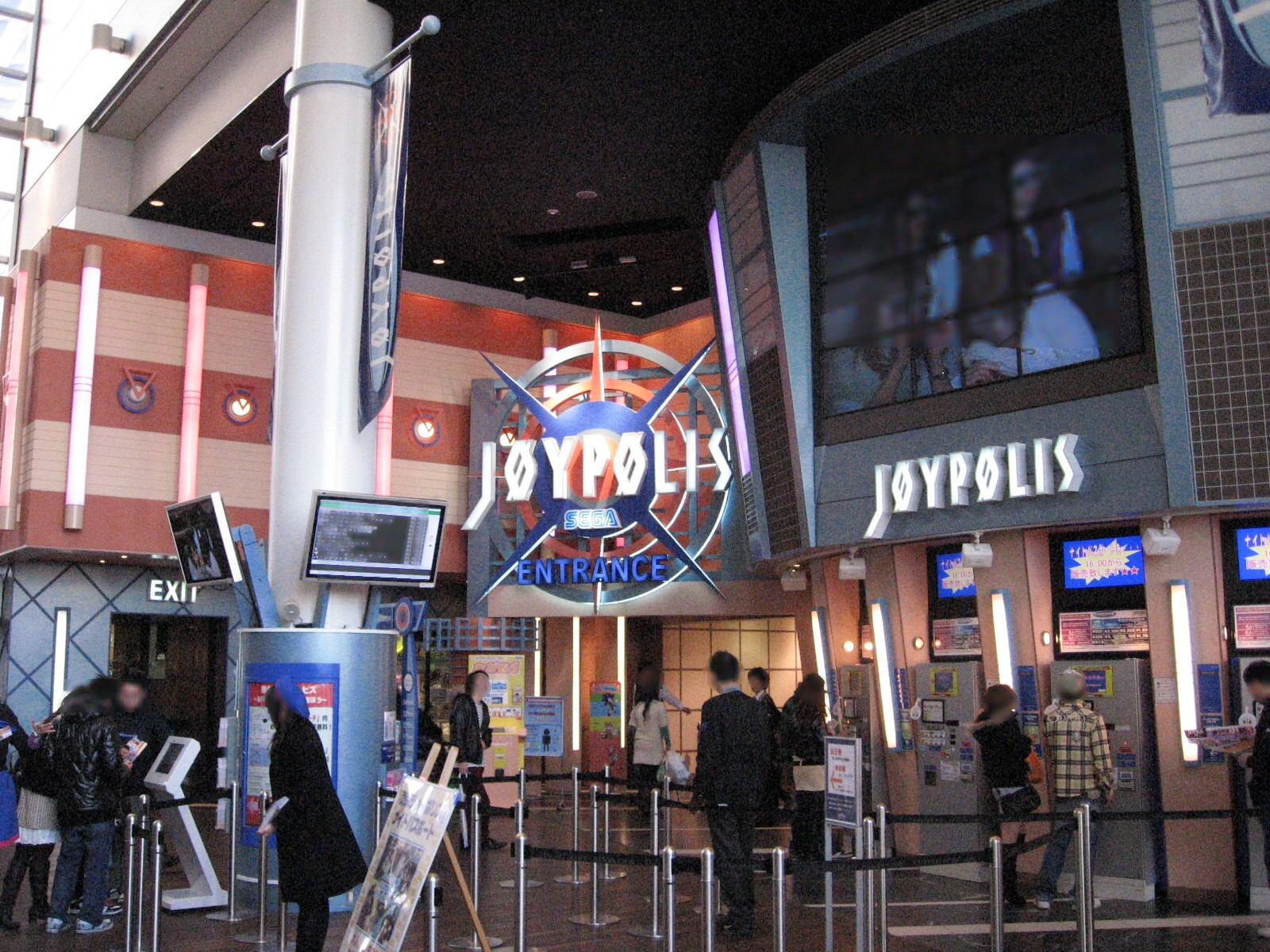
Second entrance to Tokyo Joypolis

== Locations ==
=== Operating ===
==== Japan ====
===== Tokyo =====
The flagship Joypolis park is located in Odaiba area of Tokyo, and originally opened on 12 July 1996. Currently, it is the only Japanese Joypolis park to remain in operation and has been refurbished twice - in December 2000 and early 2012.

===== Sendai (Joypolis Sports) =====
In January 2022, a new format under the Joypolis name was officially announced. Joypolis Sports is a sports center located in Izumi-ku, Sendai on the Sendai Nakayama complex and will heavily focus on sports-related activities, as well as a few minor non-Sports facilities like a Comic Book section, and a small arcade. The venue was originally planned to open on March 18, but this opening window was put on hold a day before opening following the 2022 Fukushima earthquake. On April 13, the venue announced a new opening date of April 29.

==== China ====
===== Shanghai =====
The first Joypolis park in China opened in the Changning District of Shanghai, and opened in two phases: the first in December 2014, and the second in February 2016.

===== Guangzhou =====
In January 2021, it was announced that a Joypolis park would open in Guangzhou on the Junming Happy World complex later in the year which will contain 40 attractions. It will be the first Joypolis venue to open in South China.

It was originally planned to open in September 2021, but after a delay, the venue opened on May 9, 2022.

=== Closed ===
==== Yokohama ====
The first flagship Joypolis theme park was located in Yokohama, opening on July 20, 1994. It was the second park to launch under Sega's "Amusement Theme Park" concept after the Osaka ATC Galbo venue in Osaka, which had opened three months previously. Initially exceeding its expected revenue and visitor number targets, it lagged behind after its flagship status was superseded by the larger Tokyo branch.

The venue reopened as Joypolis H. Factory on July 25, 1999 as part of a partnership with media personality and comedian Hiromi. Due to restructurings at Sega, the venue closed permanently on 28 February 2001. Nearby facilities, including on-site McDonald's outlets, initially continued to operate.

The building formerly housing the park was subsequently used as a warehouse, before being demolished to make way for an apartment block.

==== Niigata ====
On 9 December 1995, the second Joypolis venue opened in Chūō-ku, Niigata City. Sega transitioned the operating rights of the park to an outside company, Magic City Co, Ltd. in April 1998, due to poor performance after its first year.

The park was rebranded by the new operators as Magic City @ Niigata Joypolis, featuring an electronic card payment system, and having most of its virtual attractions replaced with standard arcade rides. It closed permanently after further management issues on January 16, 2001.

The building that formerly housed the park later became part of the Bandai City Billboard Place entertainment complex and was renamed the BP2, consisting of retail stores on the first and second floors (including a branch of the Niigata City Manga / Anime Information Center) and a cinema on the third floor.

==== Fukuoka ====
On April 20, 1996, a Joypolis opened in Fukuoka as one of the opening tenants of the Canal City Hakata complex. The venue closed on 24 September 2001 due to restructuring at Sega. The venue was split into two, one half became home to a Ramen Stadium restaurant and the other half was retained by Sega, who reopened the downsized arcade as a Club Sega venue, and operated it until the late-2000s when it was replaced with a Taito Station.

==== Shinjuku ====
A Joypolis in Shinjuku opened on October 4, 1996. Located on the tenth and eleventh floors of the Shinjuku Takashimaya branch on its opening day, it was one of the venue's major entertainment tenants alongside an IMAX theatre. The park became the first Joypolis to close permanently on August 22, 2000, with competition from Tokyo Joypolis elsewhere in the capital officially cited. The floors formerly housing the park are used as an art gallery (10) and an exhibition hall (11).

==== Kyoto ====
A Joypolis opened in Kyoto on September 11, 1997, located on the tenth floor of the local branch of Isetan. Though still containing a number of newly-developed attractions, it took up a significantly smaller floor space compared to most other Joypolis venues, and no entry fees were charged. The venue closed on August 22, 2002, due to unprofitability, which by its final years only two attractions (Sega Touring Car Championship Special and Wild River) operated. The floor where the park once existed now houses sections selling souvenirs.

==== Okayama ====
A Joypolis opened in Yokohama on July 18, 1998. It was part of the Joyful Town complex operated by Ito Yokado, consisting of other unrelated venues. A Sonic-themed bowling was located on the third floor of the property, alongside karaoke rooms.

On March 23, 2008, all the remaining attractions were removed from the complex, followed up with the bowling alley and karaoke facilities on July 17. Unlike the other venues, the operations were transferred to Sega Entertainment Co, Ltd. in October 2012 due to its arcade status.

The venue closed on 2 September 2018 after all tenants of the Joyful Town complex were notified to leave their premises due to redevelopment. The building was demolished in November that year.

==== Umeda ====
On November 28, 1998, a Joypolis opened in Umeda, Osaka as part of the Hep Five shopping centre complex, located on the 8th and 9th floors. It was the last Joypolis venue to be opened by Sega in the 1990s. The venue closed on May 6, 2018, after its lease expired.

A Namco VR Zone later opened up in the space in September of that year, trading until 25 October 2020. The space is now home to the Bandai Namco Cross Store.

==== VR Shibuya ====
Around October 2018, a Joypolis-branded venue opened in Shibuya. This venue specifically focused on VR attractions, similar to a Namco VR Zone and other VR arcades. The venue closed on 30 June 2020.

==== Qingdao ====
In July 2015, a Joypolis venue opened in Qingdao. This is the only one of the Chinese venues to be directly owned by CA Sega Joypolis and not licensed to their owner China Animations.

On April 26, 2023, Qingdao Joypolis decided to shut down on May 31, 2023.

== Joypolis attractions ==
=== Tokyo Joypolis ===
Name	Opened	Floor	Description
Ace Attorney in Joypolis	2012	F3	A mystery attraction that is based on the Ace Attorney visual novel series.
Attack on Titan: The ATTRACTION	2019	F3	A walkthrough show-type attraction based on the Attack on Titan manga series.
Fortune Forest	1996	F3	A virtual forest that tells guests what their futures will be like. Until 2006, it was called Fortune Museum.
Gekion Live Coaster	2012	F1	A spinning roller coaster combined with a music game, manufactured by Gerstlauer Amusement Rides GmbH. It was the first spinning coaster with an inversion and launch. The attraction formerly traded as Veil of Dark, until 2016, which featured a different form of gameplay that starts as a shooting dark ride using controllers mounted to the restraints. There are two shooting sections separated by a short chain lift before the tire launch.
Halfpipe Tokyo	1996	F1	A ride similar to that of a Frisbee, where two guests snowboard down a halfpipe with chosen music. It was known as Halfpipe Canyon until 2012.
House of the Dead: Scarlet Dawn: The Attraction	2020	F2	An attraction version of the Sega arcade game House of the Dead: Scarlet Dawn with moving seats. Up to twelve players can play at once.
The Joypolis Explorer	2011	F1	A walk-through treasure hunting attraction where guests hunt for emblems throughout the park before time runs out, and if successful, they can undercover the treasure warehouse.
LASER SHOOTING -ISSEN-	2024	F1	A story-based lightgun attraction.
Lola and Carla the Beauty Contest	2009	F3	An attraction where Joypolis attendees answer questions to create a character.
MISSION SPARK	2025	F2	An attraction where guests press on buttons.
Mystic Mansion: Tale of Pandemonium	2017	F3	A 3D horror show, of which the seats can rotate to show the ride film on all four sides of the attraction walls.
Murder Lodge	2020	F3	A 3D sound attraction, originally seen at the park in 1997 until 1999. It underwent various themes and names before reverting back in 2020.
Pirate's Plunder	2017	F1	An Alterface shooting theater ride with a pirate theme.
SADAKO - The Curse Psychic Manor	2019	F3	A fortune-telling walk-through attraction based on the film Sadako, and is one of the numerous walk-throughs based on The Ring that have been featured in the park over the years.
Sonic Athletics	2013	F2	A Sonic the Hedgehog-themed racing arcade game powered by a treadmill. Up to eight players can play the game at once, each as a different character.
Spicy Taxi	2019	F1	A arcade game/ride hybrid where up to four guests take a ride on a taxi as they solve quizzes and play minigames to get to the treasure.
Storm-G	2009	F2	A bobsleigh arcade game, of which the cabinet can rotate 360 degrees.
Transformers: Human Alliance Special	2015	F2	A ride version of the arcade game Transformers: Human Alliance with 360 degree movements. The cabinet is similar to Sega's R360 machine.
Wild Jungle Brothers	2000	F3	A jungle-themed jeep simulator. Known as simply Wild Jungle until 2006.
Wild River: The Treasure Hunt	2000	F3	A jungle-themed dinghy simulator, originally located at Shinjuku Joypolis. Known as Wild River until 2006 and Wild River - Splash! until 2015.
Wild Wing	2004	F3	A jungle-themed hang glider simulator.

==== Former attractions ====
Name	Opened	Closed	Floor	Description
Aqua Nova	1996	2005	F1	Simulator attraction. Was removed following the Viva! Skydiving incident due to safety precautions
Aquarena	1999	2011	F1	A virtual aquarium. Originally located on the second floor, it was later moved to the first. Replaced with The Joypolis Explorer.
AS-1	1996	2004	F1	Standard Motion Simulator attraction seen at other Joypolis parks.
Beast in Darkness	1996	1998	F3	Hybrid walk-through and dark ride facility. Split into Terrors of America and Horror Ride.
Horror Ride	1998	2004	F3	A tracked motion simulator, formed as a spin-off of the tracked portion of Beast in Darkness. It was dismantled in 2004 and replaced with Wild Wing.
Sky Cruising	1999	2013	F1	Flying theatre attraction, replaced with Sonic Ghost Shooting.
Sonic Ghost Shooting	2013	2016	F1	Projection shooting dark ride. Replaced with a Zero Latency VR venue.
Spin Bullet	1996	2012	F1	A spinning coaster built by Masago Industrial. It originally opened as Rail Chase: The Ride in 1996 as a successor to the installment in Yokohama. It was renamed and rethemed as Speed Boarder to prepare for the park's first remodelling at the end of 2000, and to its final name and theme in 2006. It was removed and dismantled at the start of 2012 as part of the park's second major remodelling, and was replaced with Veil of Dark (Gekion Live Coaster).
The House of the Dead 4 Special	2006	2020	F2	A light-gun attraction serving as the expansion to The House of the Dead 4, featuring rotating seats that mimick the character's movement. Also available via separate arcade booths in locations outside Joypolis. It was removed from Joypolis in 2020 and replaced with The House of the Dead: Scarlet Dawn: The Attraction
Treasure Panic	1996	2000	F3	A shooting dark ride based on Ghost Hunters at the other Joypolis parks. It was removed as prat of the park's first remodelling in 2000 and replaced with Wild Jungle and Wild River
Weird Photo Studio	1996	1999	F3	Horror walk-through facility.
Viva! Skydiving	1996	2005	F1	Drop Tower that simulated skydiving, originally known as Time Fall. Removed following a major incident (see below)

==== Other attractions ====
- JP Store: A store that sells Sega-themed merchandise and souvenirs.
- Main Stage: A stage that is located in the main atrium of the park and houses events.
- Multi Stage: A stage that is located in Frame Cafe.
- Prizes Corner: An area containing UFO catchers, with merchandise exclusive to Joypolis.
- Sonic Carnival: A section for younger Joypolis attendees featuring carnival games themed to Sonic and his friends.
- Space Interaction: Zones that fuse the digital world with the real world.

==== Restaurants ====
- Crepe Store: A crepe-selling store.
- D-Lounge: An interactive lounge that serves Joypolis attendees snacks and drinks. This is the only area of the park that serves Joypolis attendees alcohol.
- Dippin' Dots Ice Cream: A Dippin' Dots-selling store.
- Frame Cafe: A café that provides the views of Tokyo.

=== Qingdao Joypolis ===
==== Normal attractions ====
- Animal Treasure Box: An attraction where Joypolis attendees need to look for animals in a 3D environment.
- Beautiful Test: A picture-showcase attraction.
- Chuang Jurassic: A 3D simulator.
- Deadly Blitz: A VR shooting game.
- Fortune Forest: is a virtual forest that tells Joypolis attendees what their futures will be like.
- GO GO Jockey!: An arcade-game that is powered with a plastic horse that Joypolis attendees need to ride on.
- Horror House: A haunted house-themed attraction.
- Initial D Arcade Stage 4 Limited: A driving simulator that is based on the manga series of the same name. Joypolis attendees sit in real cars for this game.
- Search Impossible: A haunted house-themed attraction.
- Sega Lightning Knight: A roller-coaster that has an interactive shooting element.
- Sonic Athletics: A Sonic the Hedgehog-themed racing game that is powered by a treadmill.
- Sonic Brain Ranking: A attraction that tests Joypolis attendees trivia about the Sonic the Hedgehog franchise.
- Sonic Jumping Tour: A Sonic the Hedgehog-themed 4D attraction.
- Sonic Star Race: A Sonic the Hedgehog-themed bumper-car ride.
- Sonic Tropical Resort: A Sonic the Hedgehog-themed hot-air-balloon ride.
- Spy Mission: A jungle-themed hang glider simulator.
- The First Scene: A VR attraction that is powered with a chair.
- Transformers: Human Alliance Special: A ride version of the arcade game Transformers: Human Alliance. The cabinet is similar to Sega's R360 machine.
- VR Bing Feng Warriors: A VR attraction.
- VR God-Arrow: A shooting simulator where Joypolis attendees need to use VR headsets.
- VR Living Dollhouse: A VR horror game.
- VR Snow Competition: A snowboarding simulator where Joypolis attendees need to use VR headsets.
- VR Space Warrior: A VR version of a popular game series.
- Wind Wing: A jungle-themed hang glider simulator.

==== Other attractions ====
- Balloon Walker: A luck-based game.
- Clown Cannon: A themed Skee-Ball set.
- Sea Fishing: A fishing simulator.
- Stage: A stage area.
- Thunder MT: An area that is dedicated to holding machines of the Thunder MT arcade-game.
- UFO Catchers: An area that is dedicated to UFO catcher machines.

==== Restaurants ====
- D-Lounge: An interactive lounge that serves Joypolis attendees snacks and drinks.

=== Joypolis Sports ===
==== Activities ====
- Inline skating
- Roller skating
- Skateboarding
- Casterboarding
- Struck 9 Pitching Game
- Igoball
- Comic Corner
- E-Sports Corner
- Party game Corner
- Darts
- Karaoke Box
- Billiards
- Boccia 360
- Mölkky
- Cue sports
- Table Tennis
- Billiker
- Stack Line Balance Beam
- Trampolining
- Bouldering
- Foot Darts
- Archery Hunt
- Futsal
- Bubble football
- Badminton
- Volleyball
- Teqball
- Hedis
- Basketball
- BOSS Soccer (Virtual)
- BOSS MixRun (Virtual)
- BOSS Tennis (Virtual)
- Amusement Game Corner

== Accident history ==
On April 20, 2005, Sega Corp. closed its Tokyo Joypolis (Odaiba area) theme park temporarily, pending a police investigation and an internal investigation into park safety procedures. The action came in the wake of an accident on the previous Monday in which a 30-year-old man died after he fell out of a ride. The ride, called "Viva! Skydiving," is a simulator ride that is designed to give passengers an experience of virtual skydiving. Apparently, the ride's operators allowed the overweight man to board the ride, even though the safety belt was not long enough to fit around his body. The man was secured only by an over-the-shoulder restraint, but Sega president Hisao Oguchi says that the restraint was locked in a "more loose position," causing the man to fall out. Reports indicate that, while Sega's official park operations manual forbids riders from riding without seat belts, Tokyo Joypolis had given its employees an unofficial manual that allowed ride operators to use their own discretion as to whether a person could board a ride. Sega says it was unaware that the park had its own manual.

== See also ==
- Sega World, An arcade that refers to a chain of game centres/arcades in numerous countries (primarily Japan) that are operated by Sega since 1989, as well as defunct indoor theme-park installations in the United Kingdom and Australia.
- GameWorks, An arcade that refers to mixed-use entertainment venues which were formerly operated by Sega in the United States.
- Sega Republic, A defunct indoor theme-park located at Dubai Mall, Dubai, United Arab Emirates. It was considered the first Sega-licensed indoor theme-park in the Middle East.
