= Sega World =

Chain of entertainment centres

- Industry: Amusement
- Area served: Japan (formerly the United Kingdom, Australia, Taiwan, South Korea and China)
- Owner: Genda GiGO Entertainment

Sega World (Japanese: セガワールド, Hepburn: Segawārudo), sometimes stylized as SegaWorld, is a formerly international chain of amusement arcades and entertainment centers created by Sega.

Though not the first venues to be developed by the company, with operations dating back to the late 1960s in Japan, it would come to involve some of their most prolific and successful examples in the 1990s and 2000s. During their peak period in the 1990s, there were at least 101 Sega World locations across the world.

Off the back of the initial success of the venues, Sega were able to expand into developing the Joypolis indoor theme parks and several other amusement and entertainment center chains. However, a large majority of these were closed in the 2000s, primarily due to a worldwide decline in the amusement arcade industry rendering some centers unprofitable, an ongoing recession in Japan, and cost-cutting measures at Sega in the midst of their restructuring. Recent years have seen the name fall out of favour, with most of the remaining venues now using generic "Sega" branding. Alongside these, they currently continue to be operated under the Sega name by Genda Inc., after their 85.1% majority acquisition of Sega Entertainment's shares in 2020. In January 2022, Genda acquired the remaining shares and announced that it would rebrand all of Sega's venues under the name GiGO (reviving one of Sega's previous brands).

One of the most significant uses of the name was for the SegaWorld London and Sega World Sydney indoor theme park venues in the late 1990s; these were both short-lived and closed after three years of operations.

== Operations ==
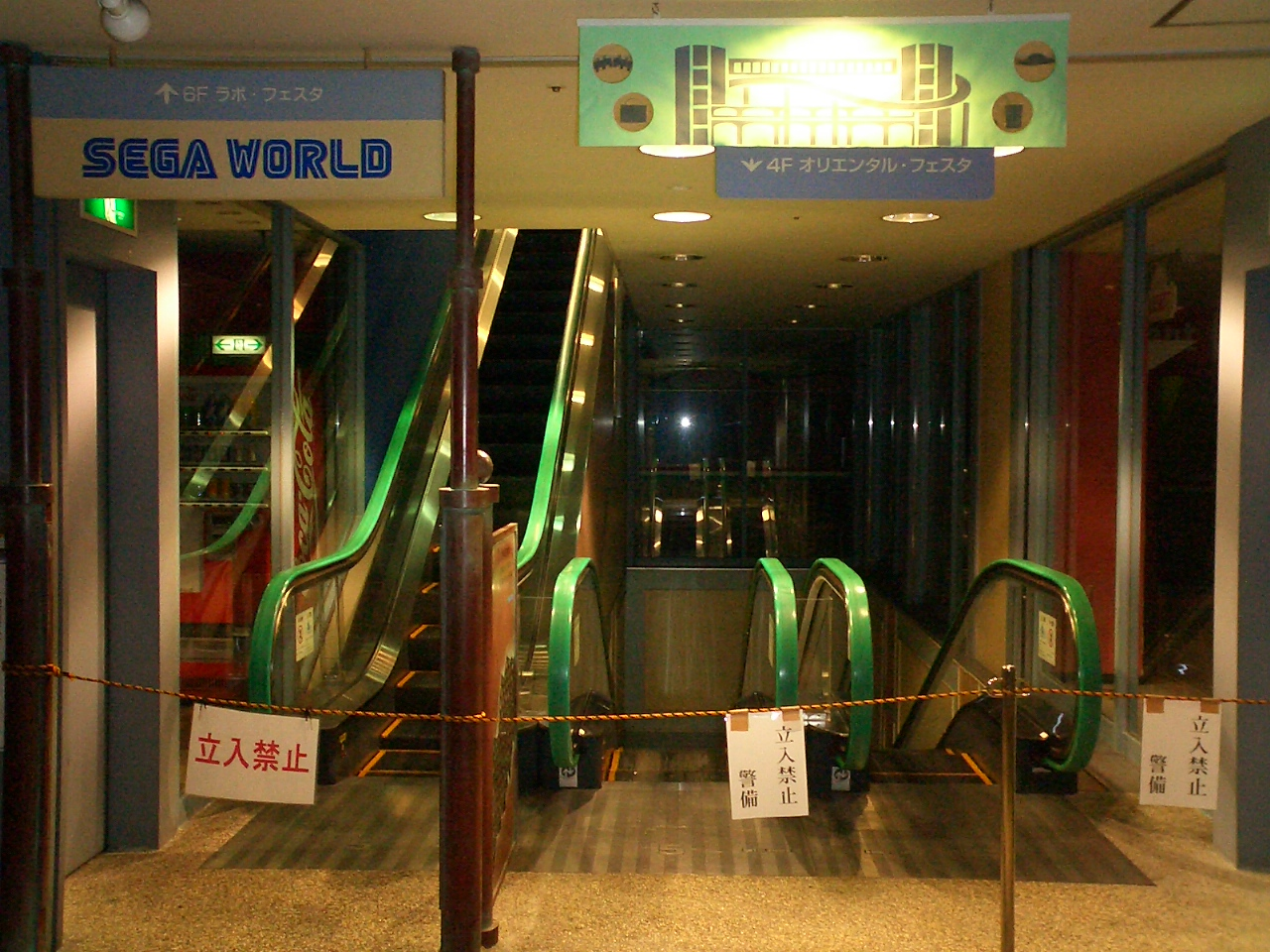
Entrance to Sega World in the now-defunct Festivalgate theme park, October 2004

Sega Worlds are most typically standard amusement arcades featuring Sega's own coin-operated arcade machines, alongside others. Though frequently housed in purpose-built suburban buildings, they have also been developed in other settings, including shopping malls, bowling alleys, department stores, and theme parks. Many have been specifically designed to appeal to families, although the association with their parent company has meant continued interest from video game enthusiasts.

Venues can vary in size, but, with a number of now-defunct exceptions, do not house the large-scale attractions and rides that are more commonly found in Joypolis indoor theme parks. Because of their association with Sega, some are used as location testing grounds for new games and machines developed by the company. Several locations are also known to have contained extra amenities, such as onsite food and shopping outlets.

Particularly in the 1990s, many of the arcades featured elaborate décor and designs based on Sega's Sonic the Hedgehog character, primarily used as a recognisable mascot for family appeal. Several venues contained purpose-built statues and theming, although usage of these declined in more recent years, with a large number of locations renovated and stripped of their outdated branding to fall in line with the generic "Sega" brand.

== Notable venues ==
=== Japan ===
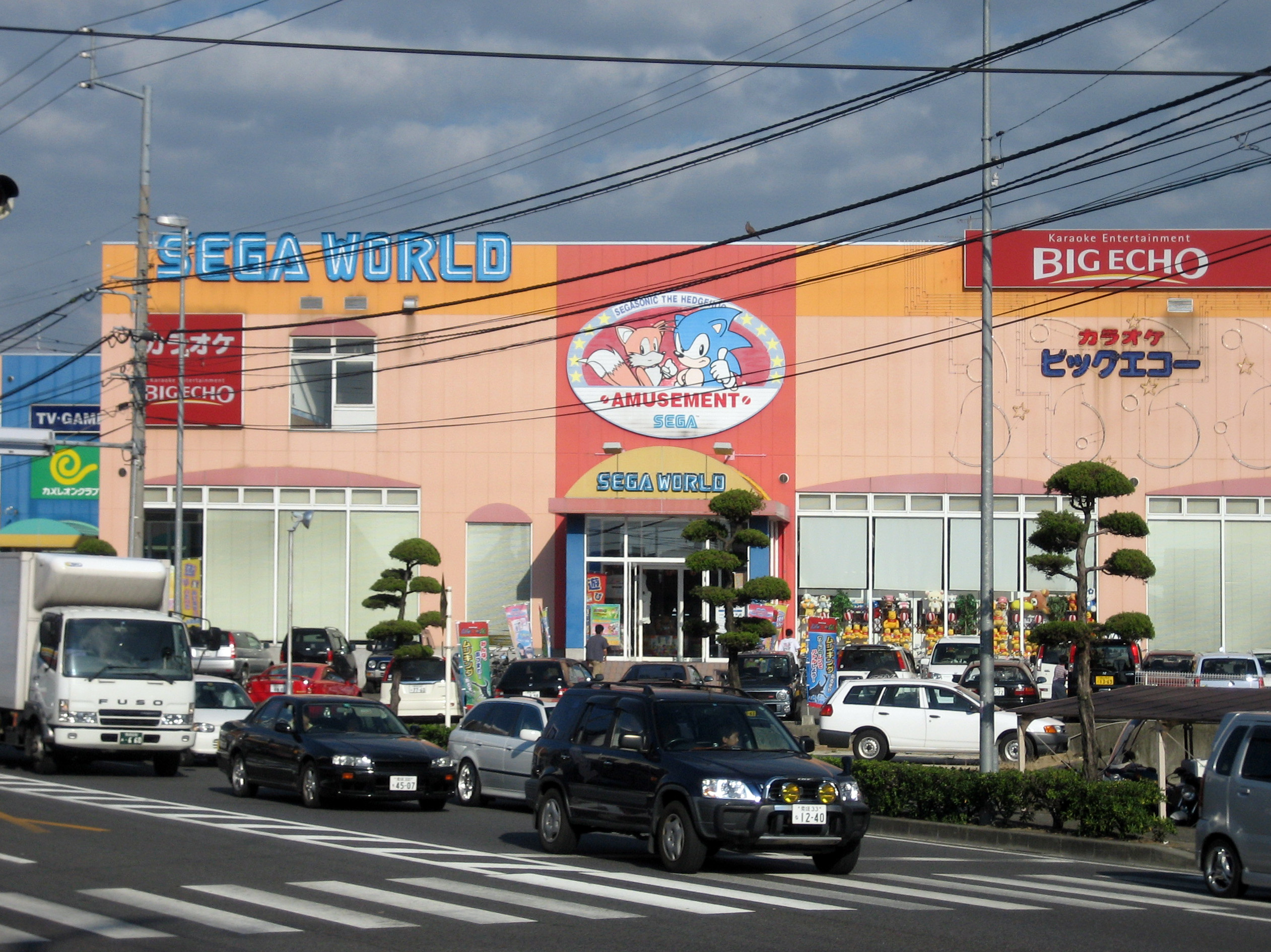
Sega World Edamatsu in September 2005

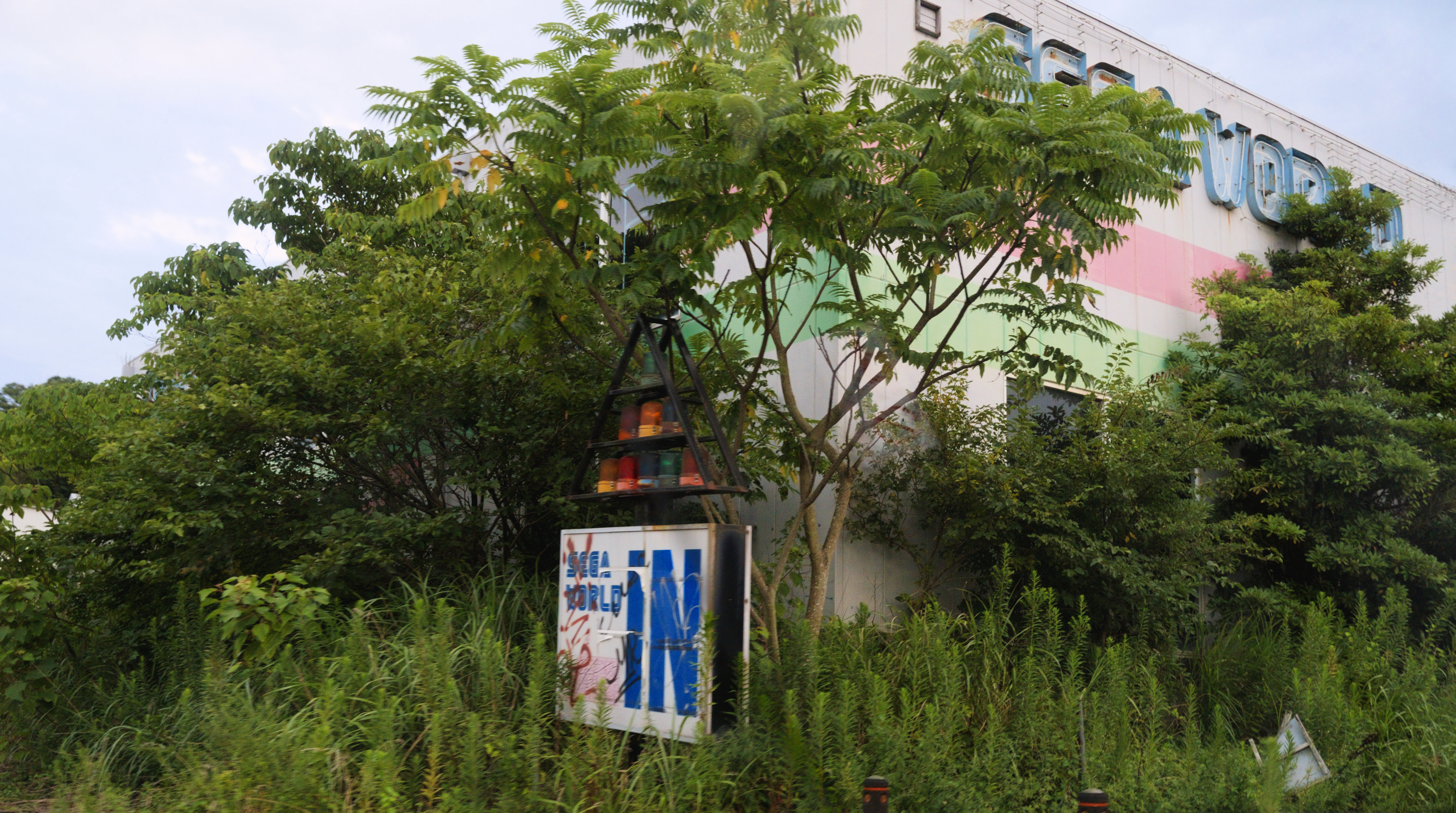
An abandoned Sega World covered in plant overgrowth in 2025, located in Ibaraki Prefecture in Japan

Having already been the location of many Hi-Tech Sega and Hi-Tech Land Sega game centers since the mid-1980s and unbranded Sega amusement centers as far back as the late 1960s, Japan was the first territory to receive venues under the Sega World name. Numbers of them are thought to have reached the hundreds during the 1990s, with a smaller number of sites still operational.

- Sega World Ito Yokado Obihiro - Opened on 25 February 1989, and located within an Ito-Yokado department store. It was designed to appeal to families with children, and was the earliest known venue to use the Sega World name, but ceased operations in the years that followed.
- O2 Park Sega World- Opened on 26 April 1990, and originally designed to appeal to both families and young adults, with a musical design motif, and a mixture of both video games and children's rides. Currently continues to operate as a rebranded Club Sega game center.
- Sega World Tokyo Roof - Opened on 14 September 1990 as part of the Tokyo Roof entertainment exhibition. It was not planned to be permanent, and it closed after 290 days of operation on 30 June 1991. This arcade notably featured a Sega Super Circuit installation and R360 units.
- Sega World Shizuoka - Opened on 20 September 1991, and was Japan's largest game center up to that point in time, taking up 1,960 sq.m. on two floors and housing a CCD Cart attraction. It closed on 5 January 2020, after 29 years of operation.
- Sega World Hakkeijima Carnival House - Opened on 8 May 1993, and located within the Yokohama Hakkeijima Sea Paradise marine park. It featured a carnival design motif, and contained AS-1 and Virtua Formula attractions in its first years of operation. Sega are believed to have stopped running the center in 2010, though it continues to stay open as a game center today.
- Sega World Kadoma - Thought to have opened at some point during the mid-1990s, this arcade was remodeled in the mid-2000s, and closed around 2006-2007. A situation arose in 2019, where a Sonic the Hedgehog statue once housed in the venue was discovered at an outdoor location in the mountains of Iga, Mie Prefecture, and was later restored in 2020 after being widely publicised by YouTube videos.
- Sega World Tomioka - Opened in 1995, this venue was one of many buildings abandoned after the Fukushima Daiichi nuclear disaster in 2011. Originally, the arcade was to be repaired and remodeled after the earthquake, but due to the effects of radiation, it was left remaining standing but not operating, and the dilapidated remains of the venue (with unremoved arcade machines intact) remained until November 2020, when the arcade began being dismantled, and was completed in early 2021. Other parts of the building, including signages and games, were likely destroyed, as they had been contaminated prior to the dismantling.
- Sega World Apollo - Originally known as Apollo Vegas upon opening in July 1972, this arcade was rebranded to become a Sega World at a later date. This arcade is thought to be Sega's longest-running arcade venue, surviving numerous restructures and periods of losses in the company.

=== United Kingdom ===
With operations assisted by Deith Leisure, the UK is believed to have been the country to receive the most Sega World locations outside of Japan, though all of them have since closed permanently. Newer arcade venues affiliated with Sega continue to be run in the country under the Sega Prize Zone and Sega Active Zone names.

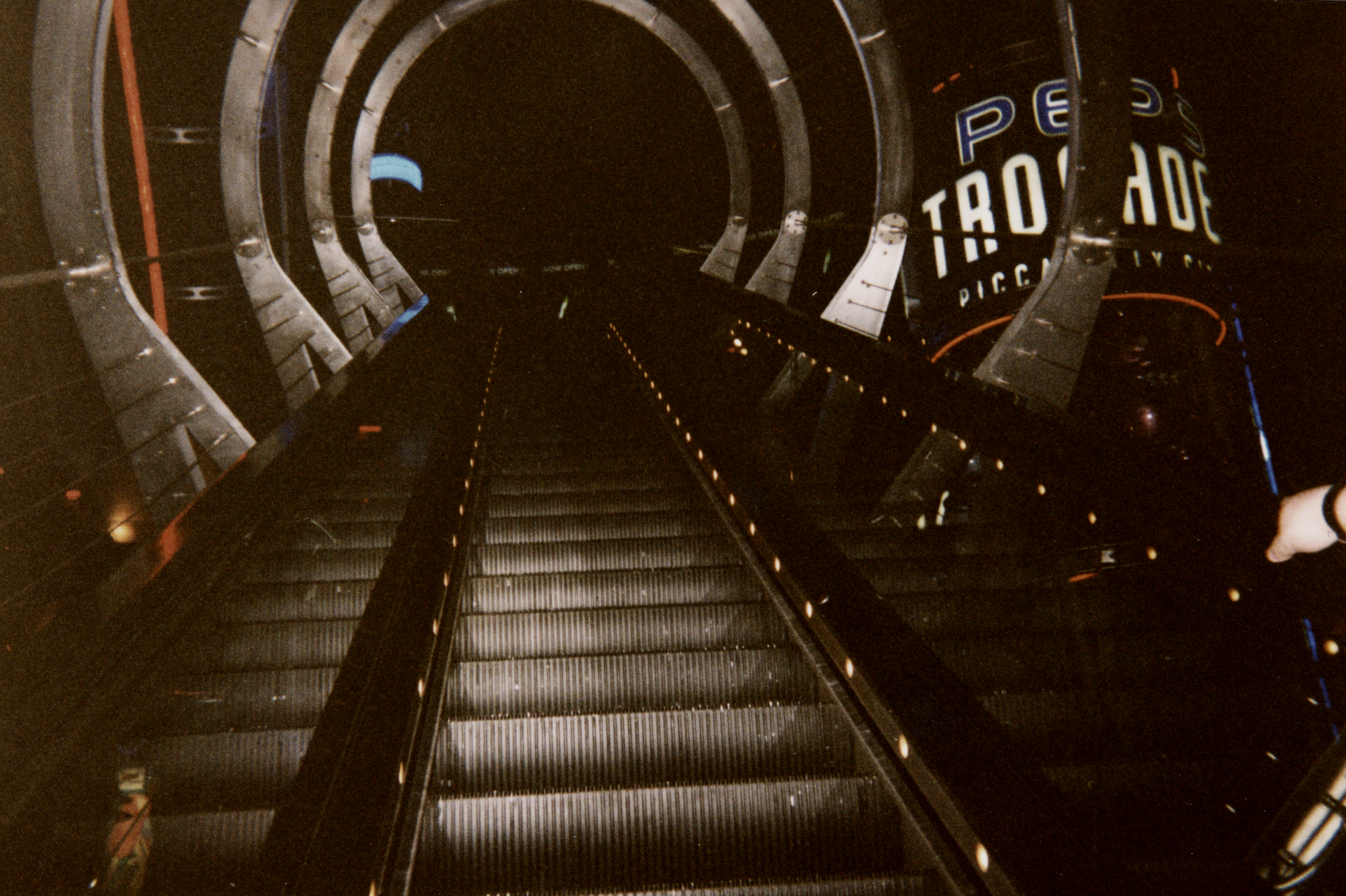
Upward view from within Rocket entrance escalator in SegaWorld London

- Sega World Bournemouth - Opened on 24 July 1993 on Westover Road, occupying 35,000m² of its building. Was Sega's initial flagship arcade venue in Europe, also containing a Burger King outlet, an official Sega shop, and mini bowling alley lanes, among other extra facilities. It later made significant losses in off-season periods, with many of its features removed in the years that followed, and eventually became a Sega Park in 1998. After changing ownership twice, around 1/4th of its original space continues to operate as a rebranded arcade and bowling alley.
- Sega World Tamworth - Opened sometime between 1994 and 1996, and located above a Strykers Pleasure Bowl bowling alley on River Drive, taking up much of its first floor. It was later moved downstairs to a smaller area, under the new name of Sega Park, and became a Namco Station venue in 2001, which has remained as since.

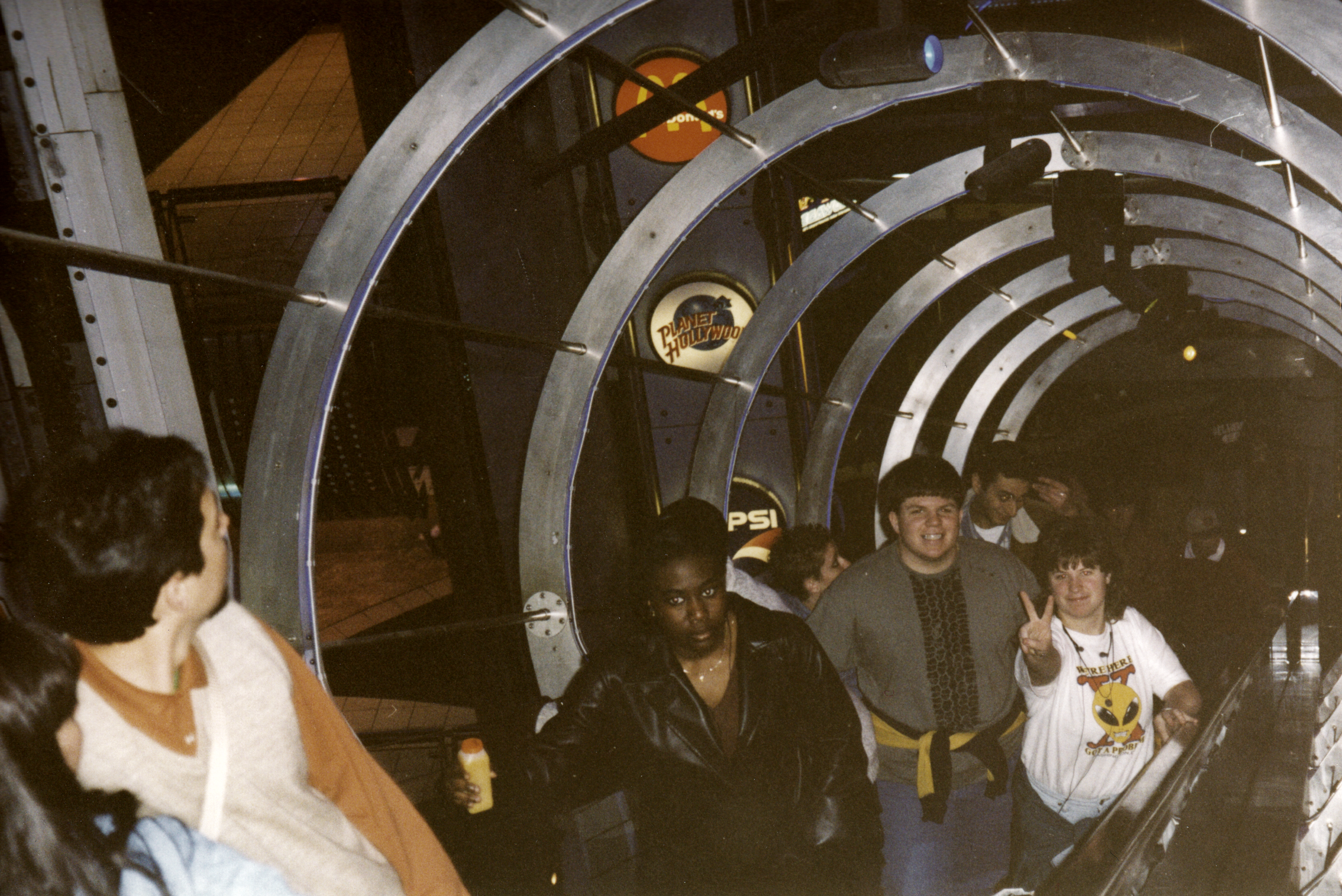
Downward view from within Rocket entrance escalator in SegaWorld London

- Sega World Birmingham - Opened sometime between 1994 and 1996, and took up floor space above a branch of Blockbuster Video on Erdington High Street. It closed in the late 1990s after falling into a period of decline, with its former space subsequently converted to a tanning salon and later UTC gym.
- Sega World Wolverhampton - Opened sometime between 1994 and 1996, and located within a now-defunct Strykers Pleasure Bowl bowling alley on West Shaw Road, Bushbury. It was later replaced by a pool hall and smaller unbranded arcade area in the late 1990s. The building that it was once housed in was destroyed in a fire. An advertisement for the venue still exists on a bridge several streets away from its former grounds.
- SegaWorld London - Opened to the public on 7 September 1996, and was Sega's first indoor theme park outside of Japan, became their flagship venue in Europe, and occupied a total area of 10200m² on seven floors of the London Trocadero complex. Cashflow issues largely caused by mismanagement of various aspects and poor reviews forced Sega to pull out of the venue under contract three years after opening, with the floors latterly becoming the ownership of Family Leisure, operators of the Funland arcade situated elsewhere in the Trocadero. Officially became known as Funland in February 2000, which subsequently downsized in September 2002 and closed permanently on 4 July 2011, after further mismanagement problems.

=== Australia ===
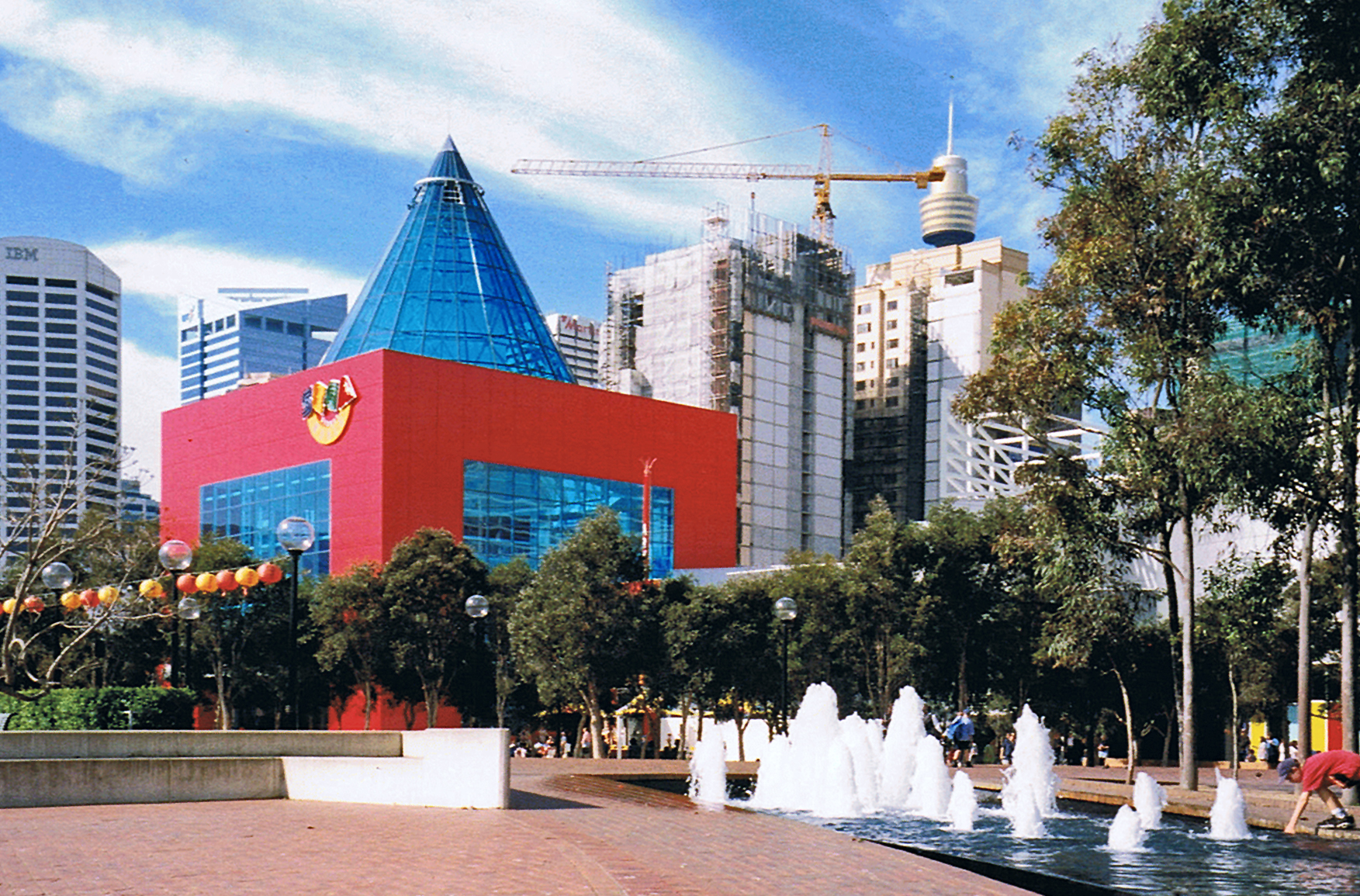
Main Sega World Sydney building, late 1990s

Sega expanded operations to Australia in the late 1990s, after previously establishing venues in other overseas territories during the earlier part of the decade. Though several venues are known to have been planned for the country, only one ultimately came to fruition.

- Sega World Sydney - Opened on 18 March 1997 as the main tenant of the Darling Walk complex in Darling Harbour. Was the second and final overseas Sega World indoor theme park, containing copies of numerous attractions previously seen in Joypolis venues and SegaWorld London. The arcade suffered due to lower than expected visitor turnout after initial success, and closed permanently in November 2000 after the 2000 Summer Olympics did not improve numbers. It was later demolished in November 2008.

=== Taiwan ===
Taiwan is thought to have been the earliest territory outside of Japan to receive Sega World locations after Sega Amusement Taiwan was formed to handle operations in the county in late 1991. Though Sega arcade venues continue to operate in the country, none are under the Sega World name.

- Sega World Chiayi City - Opened on 1 February 1992, and located within the Chia-Ya City department store, owned by Far Eastern Group and occupying 560m². It was Sega's first arcade in the region and is thought to have been the first overseas Sega World, but has since closed permanently.
- Sega World Wanguo - Opened in June 1993. Located on the first floor of the IWC Department store, and primarily contained claw and photo booth machines, as well as a crêpe shop. Thought to have closed at some point after the mid-2000s.
- Sega World Oe - Opened on 14 January 1994, and originally situated on the third and fourth floors of the Dajiang Shopping mall. It later downsized and rebranded to only occupy the fourth. This arcade contained a Wild River attraction more typically found in Joypolis venues during the mid-2000s.

=== China ===
Little is currently known about Sega World operations in China, as the few venues opened are thought to have closed around the time or before the later Player's Arena and Joypolis indoor theme parks were developed in the country.

- Sega World Shanghai - Located in the basement of the Metro-City shopping mall. It opened during the 2000s and possibly earlier.
- Sega World Beijing - Located in the Beijing apm shopping mall. It closed at some point after 2010.

=== South Korea ===
South Korea received at least two Sega World locations in the mid-2000s managed by Sega Korea; both have since closed permanently.

- Sega World Gwonseon-gu - Opened on 25 August 2005, and closed a little over a year later in October 2006.
- Sega World Jukjeon - Opened on 9 September 2005, and closed in May 2007.

== Other venues ==
Other amusement venues operated by Sega have included:

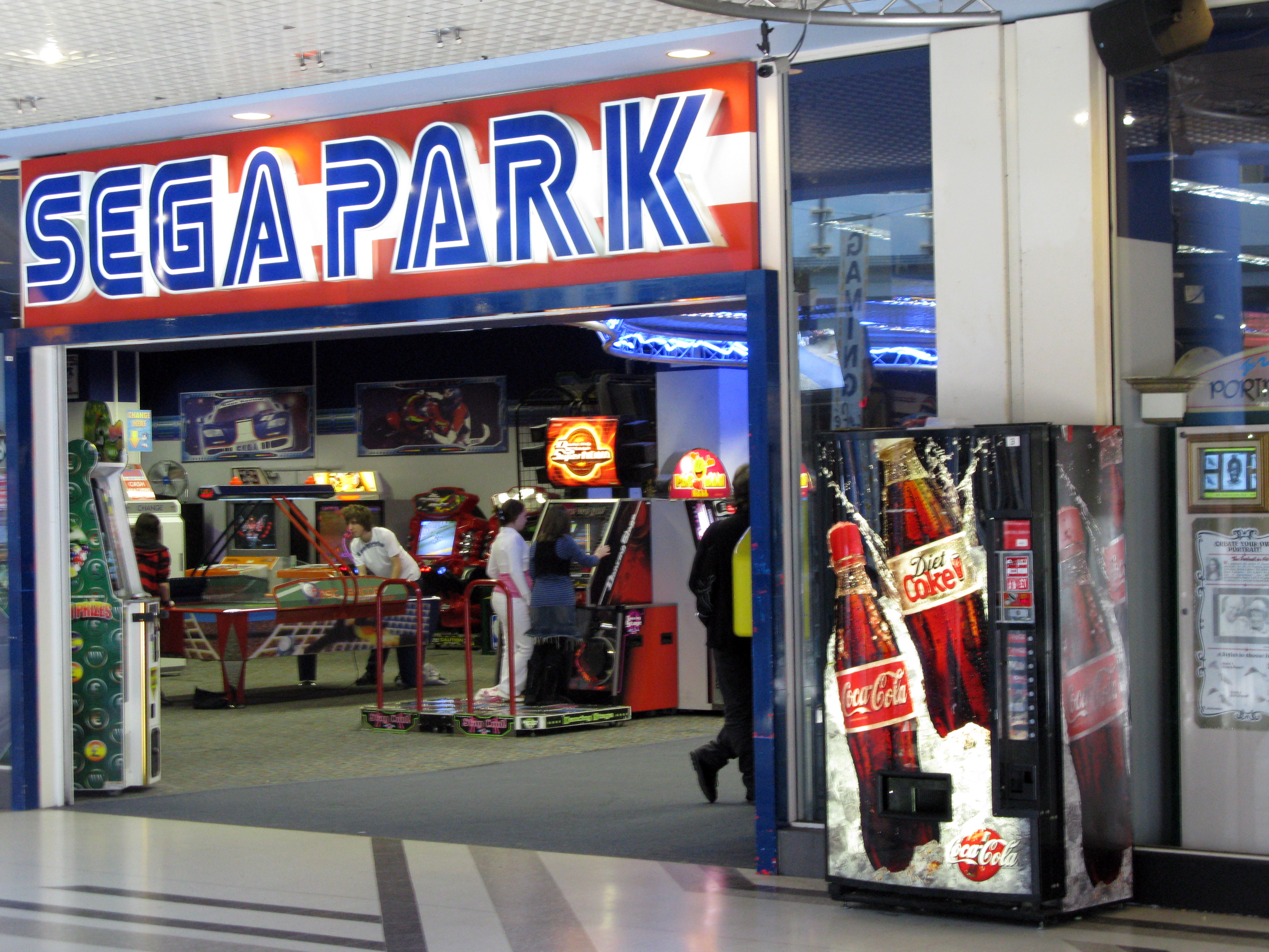
Sega Park Southampton, UK, 2009

- P.J. Pizzazz - A chain of family entertainment centers planned for North America that imitated the more successful Chuck E. Cheese. Two locations were opened in the early 1980s before a re-evaluation in 1982 causing Sega to discontinue the scheme.
- Time-Out - A chain of amusement arcades in North America owned by Sega for a three-year period from 1987 to 1990.
- Gameworks - A chain of mixed-use entertainment venues operated in North America, formerly affiliated with Sega.
- Sega City - A short-lived chain of large amusement arcades in North America that opened in the mid-1990s. Several locations were rebranded to use the GameWorks name, with others closed permanently within a few years of opening.
- Hi-Tech Sega - A chain of small inner-city venues in Japan, operating from the mid-1980s to the 2000s.
- Hi-Tech Land Sega - A chain of larger inner-city venues in Japan, operating from the mid-1980s to the 2000s.
- Galbo - A chain of a small number of smaller indoor theme park venues in Japan, operating during the mid-to-late 1990s.
- GiGO - A chain of larger inner-city venues in Japan, operating from the early 1990s to the late 2000s. It is an abbreviation of "Get into the Gaming Oasis".
- Club Sega - A chain of larger inner-city entertainment venues in Japan, operating from the late 1990s to the late 2000s.
- Sega Arena - A chain of larger entertainment center venues located in Japan and, for a brief period, Taiwan.
- Sega Park - A chain of smaller amusement arcades in the United Kingdom, Spain, and Portugal, operating during the 1990s and 2000s.
- Sega Republic - A now-defunct indoor theme park located at the Dubai Mall in the United Arab Emirates, that operated from 2009 until 2017. It is now home to a VR-focused theme park.
- Sega - A chain of one-off venues with differing names from the 1990s to the 2000s, and most recently, the standardised name for almost all game centers affiliated with Sega in Japan and Taiwan, including the three long-standing locations in Akihabara. These venues are currently in a phase of being rebranded under the GiGO name.
- Joypolis - A chain of indoor theme park venues located in Japan and China.
