= Sega World Sydney =

Indoor amusement park in Sydney, Australia

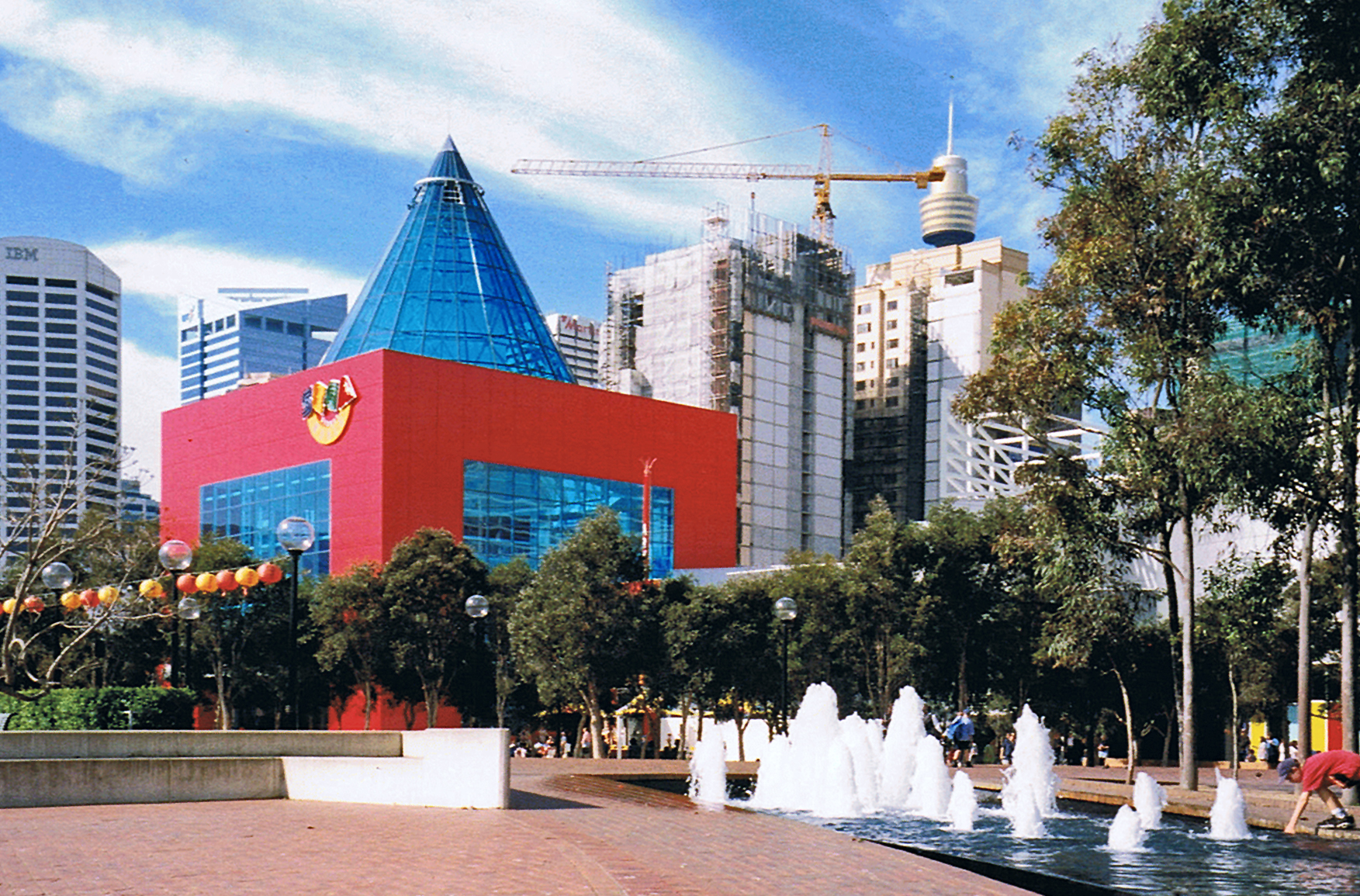
- The Sega World Sydney building
- Interactive map of Sega World Sydney
- Location: Darling Harbour, Sydney, Australia
- Coordinates: 33.8746°S 151.2025°E
- Status: Defunct
- Opened: 6 March 1997
- Closed: 12 November 2000 (demolished 2008)
- Slogan: Totally Out There

Attractions
- Total: 7
- Roller coasters: 1

Sega World Sydney was an indoor high-tech amusement park that operated for almost four years, in Sydney. The theme park was built as the flagship tenant of the Darling Walk complex in Darling Harbour, and was designed and themed by gaming company Sega as one of several Sega World amusement parks.

== History ==
=== Operating years ===
Jacfun, in partnership with Sega and the Darling Harbour Authority, acquired land for the park in 1994, and invested an estimated A$80 million to build Sega World Sydney, which opened on 6 March 1997. Sega World Sydney utilized the latest in multimedia, entertainment and destination attraction events. It was described as "Australia's Interactive Disneyland" by the media. Many of the themes were based on various Sega franchises, primarily Sonic the Hedgehog. The park was also host for underage dance parties called Crush, usually held during school holidays. The remainder of the complex was sublet to a mix of retail and entertainment tenants, including the Daintree Cafe and the One World Sports restaurant and bar.

Due to below-expected attendance and constant financial losses, the park was closed in November 2000. Hopes that the influx of tourists traveling to Sydney for the 2000 Summer Olympics would help the park meet its 800,000-visitor breakeven point went unrealized. Sega had sold its stake in the park to Jacfun in 1999, for A$36 million.

In March 2001, all the contents of the park were auctioned off. Only 300 people attended the auction, with most of the rides sold off for minimal prices. The two major rides of the park, Rail Chase and Ghost Hunters, were sold to foreign buyers, with one of the rides going for A$60,000 less than its intended sale price of A$200,000. However, some of the amusement park's interior fixtures were still in place as of 2008, covered by backdrops and boarding.

=== Post-closure ===
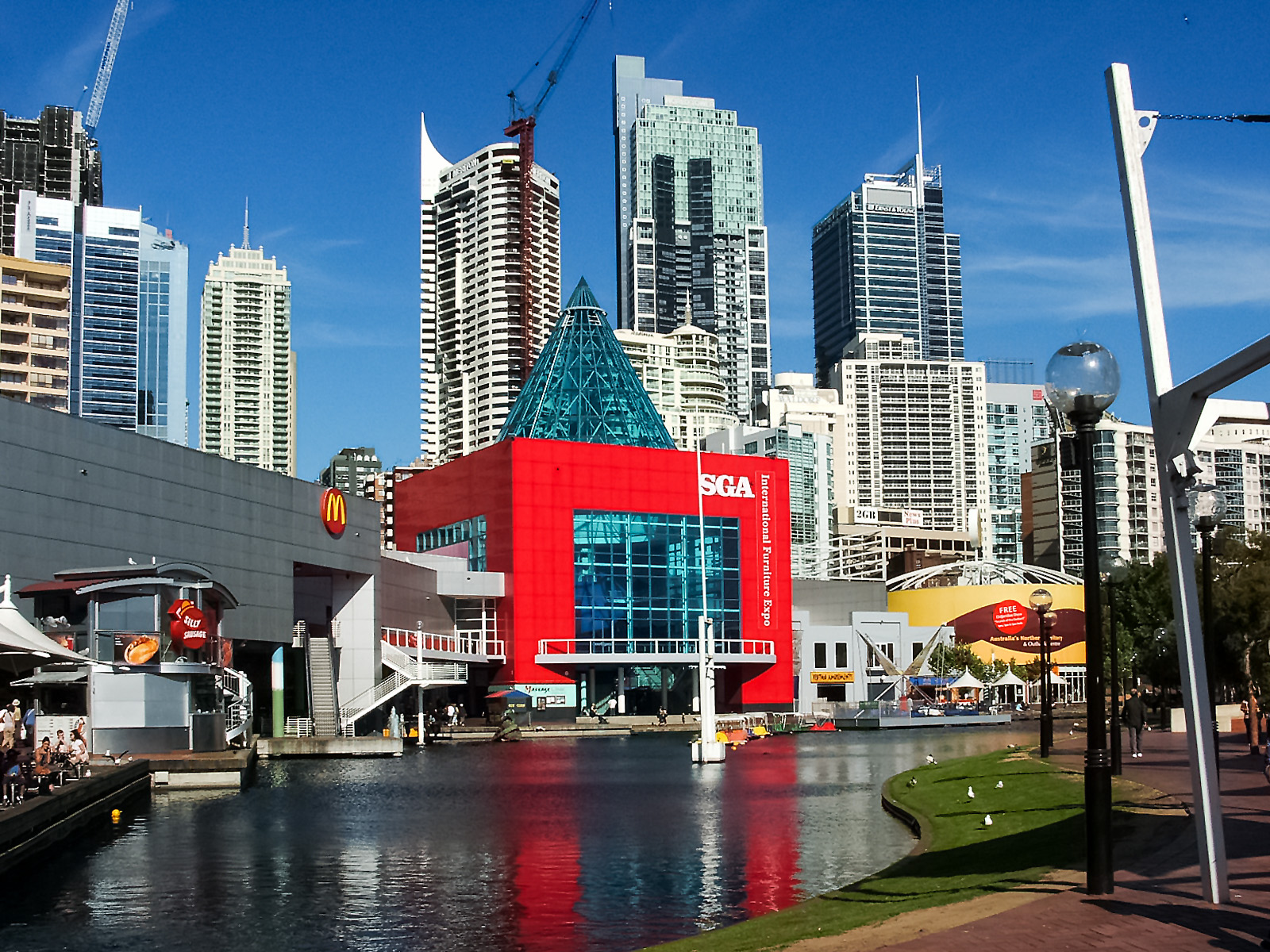
The Sega World building in 2006, two years before demolition

Shortly after Sega World closed, the two other major tenants of the Darling Walk complex, the Daintree Cafe and the One World Sports restaurant and bar, also closed. Jacfun planned to install another entertainment complex to replace Sega World, as the restrictions of the "entertainment use" zoning prevented Jacfun from exploring other options, such as replacing the building with offices. In March 2003, unable to find a new flagship tenant and losing money, Jacfun sold the lease for the Darling Walk site back to the Sydney Harbour Foreshore Authority for $10 million, with the lease set to expire in June 2008. Around May 2006, the only tenant was a McDonald's restaurant, although the former Sega World site saw use as a furniture exhibition warehouse. From June 2006 to June 2007, the former One World Sports area was used as the house for MTV reality television series The Real World: Sydney.

In 2008, the SHFA leased the Darling Walk site to Lendlease for $560 million, who planned to demolish the building and erect two nine-storey office blocks for the Commonwealth Bank. This development was permitted by the changing of the zoning affecting the site, which had occurred shortly before the lease's signing. The old building was demolished from October to November 2008. In March 2009, Jacfun initiated legal action in the Supreme Court of New South Wales against the Sydney Harbour Foreshore Authority for "deceptive conduct" and claiming a share of the redevelopment's profits. A clause in the 2003 sale of Jacfun's lease back to the SHFA stated that if the Darling Walk site was resold within five years for more than $40 million, a share of the profit would be forwarded to Jacfun; the rezoning of the site (which made the subsequent resale feasible) occurred just after the five-year period expired, and Jacfun was alleging that this had been planned prior to their lease ending. On 25 July 2012, the New South Wales Court of Appeal ordered the Sydney Harbour Foreshore Authority to pay $1.2 million for the loss of its Jacfun's opportunity to negotiate a higher price for the surrender of the lease.

In April 2018 it was discovered that the park's iconic Sonic and Sally statue that stood outside of the building, had turned up at a junkyard in Londonderry in Sydney's north west all battered up. The junkyard also houses two entryway signs from Wonderland Sydney. There have been attempts to restore these statues, but the owner who managed the junkyard refused to give them away at any cost.

In 2026, two more statues of Knuckles the Echidna and Sonic the Hedgehog were spotted in a private backyard approximately half an hour outside of Sydney.

== Rides and Theming ==
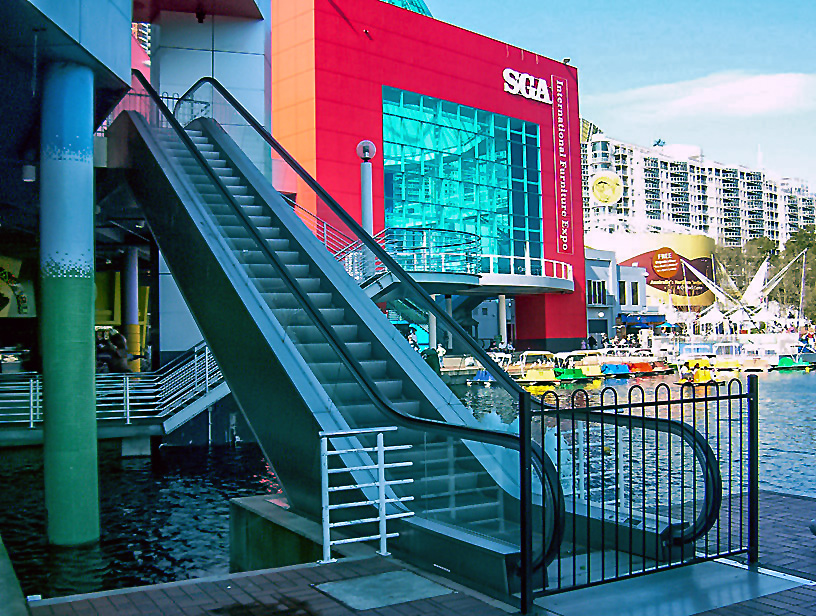
Main entrance to Sega World Sydney

The rides at Sega World were grouped by a basic theme of time travel. The park featured three sections: The Past, which featured a Steampunk-esque fusion of medieval and 19th century imagery; The Present, which represented a contemporary video arcade; and The Future, which sported an ultraviolet-lit Science fiction theme. These sections were interconnected via neon-lit walkways dubbed "Time Tunnels".

Much of the park's main allure were its offers of "futuractive" rides with interactive elements. In reality, few of the attractions installed at the venue drew upon particularly advanced technology; however, most did feature some interactive element.

Name	Opened	Description	Section
Aqua Nova	1997	A 3D motion simulator themed around a submarine on an underwater mission to destroy a giant robot squid.	The Future
AS-1	1997	A motion simulator/rail shooter ride that initially featured the ridefilm Scramble Training, where a spacecraft captain played by Michael Jackson guides riders through a training mission that becomes a real space battle when an enemy fleet suddenly decides to attack. This film was eventually replaced with Megalopolis, which cast riders as a group of police officers pursuing a criminal in a futuristic version of Tokyo. Jackson returned in a cameo role as the chief of police. The ride was later sold to Luna Park Melbourne and renamed "Holodeck", before being removed entirely.	The Future
Ghost Hunters	1997	An interactive ghost train where riders would use mounted laser cannons to fire at ghosts that were superimposed onto the ride's scenery via a pepper's ghost effect contained within the ride vehicle. After Sega World's closure, the ride was sold to the Haailand amusement park and resort in Andhra Pradesh, India.	The Past
G-LOC: Air Battle	1997	The game was a mere conduit to showcase the technology in the R360, which is a motion simulator arcade cabinet produced by Sega. Being short for "Rotate 360", the R360 is noteworthy for its ability to spin 360 degrees in any direction on two metal axis, allowing the player to freely move as the cabinet mimics the in-game action, including the ability to turn completely upside down. Gyroscope technology is used for motion.	The Present
Mad Bazooka	1997	A 'tank simulator' built by R & T Fabrications, with modified bumper cars equipped with a ball cannon. Balls were collected from the floor of the arena by running over them, and then could be fired at targets mounted to the roofs of other cars. The ride was removed in 1999 to make way for a proposed ice rink.	The Future
Magic Motion 4D	1997	A 4D cinema. According to the sales catalog from when the park's assets were auctioned off, this ride was not produced or commissioned by Sega, and was instead a SimEx-Iwerks Turbo Theater system that ran various 70mm ridefilms that were featured in other venues around the world.	The Present
Nickelodeon TV Machine	1997	A children's play area themed around the kids' TV channel Nickelodeon, which included activities based on the famous green slime, and featured a climbing jungle, ball pits, and a spiral slide. Rocko was a prominent character in the area, due to the park being located in Australia. In 2000, after the Nickelodeon license had expired, this section was briefly rebranded as KidzSpace.	The Present
Rail Chase	1997/2000	An indoor mine train roller coaster based on the arcade game of the same name. This ride, which was built by Masago Industrial, saw riders using light guns to extinguish fires spread around the elaborate scenery. In 2000, the ride was revamped into a traditional roller coaster and promoted as The All-New Rail Chase. After Sega World's closure, the ride was also sold to the Haailand resort, where it remains in operation under the name Rail Chaser.	The Past
VR-1	1997	A virtual reality-based simulator ride that saw players try to defend a city from a hostile alien invasion.	The Future

As well as the rides, the park also included a fast-food outlet and an extensive coin-op arcade, featuring over 100 arcade games. All games in this area were set to Free Play at a point in early 2000, prior to the closure.

All of the park's major attractions, except for Magic Motion 4D, were available at other Sega World parks, with AS-1 and R360 also being available at other venues not operated by Sega.

== Sonic Live in Sydney ==
Two live shows, both titled Sonic Live in Sydney, were hosted regularly at the park, with one replacing the other.

=== First Incarnation ===
The original incarnation of the show ran for 25 minutes and featured actors in mascot costumes miming along to pre-recorded dialogue. During the show, Dr. Robotnik escapes from the planet Mobius to Australia and, setting up a base on top of the Sydney Harbour Bridge, attempts a hostile takeover of the city by turning its citizens into robots. This plan is quickly foiled by Sonic, Tails, and Princess Sally. Most of the music and sound effects for the show were taken from Masato Nakamura's score on Sonic the Hedgehog 2, with three original musical numbers: "What Are We Waiting For" sung by Sonic, "Give Me Chaos" sung by Robotnik, and "Thank You for Being You" sung by Sally. A studio-recorded version of the performance was released on CD at the park.

The show was performed on multiple interconnected stages: a main stage with rainforest scenery; two long, elaborate balconies representing the Sydney Harbour Bridge that extended over the top of other parts of the park's food court; and a short walkway that hung from the ceiling behind the audience.

=== Second Incarnation ===
In 1998, one year after Sydney was first performed, the show was shut down due to a lack of interest from Sega. It was quickly replaced with an identically-named puppet show that began performing from 1998 until the park's closure in 2000.

Despite inheriting its title, this new show did not carry over the plot, cast, or any musical numbers from its predecessor. Instead, it featured a newly-written story centered on Sonic, Tails, and Sally battling against the Adventures of Sonic The Hedgehog character Grounder. In this continuity, Grounder is created by Dr. Robotnik to be his ultimate robot warrior, but quickly proves himself to be slow and inept.

=== Preservation ===
Since the park's closure, no footage of either incarnation of the show was known to exist outside of a soundtrack CD of the first incarnation. This CD, which was sold in the park's gift shop, contained album versions of all three of the show's songs, as well as the entire dialogue track that the show's actors would mime along to.

In August 2026, Australian science and video game journalist Jackson Ryan revealed that, as part of research he had been doing as for an unmade podcast on the park, he had managed to come into contact with Russell Cheek, the creator of the original incarnation of the show.

As part of his correspondence, Cheek provided Ryan with a virtually complete (Note: Approximately seven seconds of the show's opening are missing from the recording. No visual material is lost, however, as the footage begins just before the characters appear on-stage for the first time.) video recording of one of its performances. This recording was released to the public on November 12th, 2026 — 26 years to the day that Sega World Sydney closed down — through a livestream hosted by the newly-founded Australian video game culture magazine Continue. An accompanying article on the show's production history was also featured in said magazine's first issue.

Nine seconds of footage from the second incarnation has also been independently discovered as part of a home movie showing various sections of the park.

In an introductory segment to his recording of the first incarnation, Ryan also displayed images of design documents for the second incarnation's puppets, revealing that he had also been in contact with its creator, Philip Enfield. Through replies to certain comments on the video, Ryan would also hint that further Sega World material, which could potentially be related to this version of the show, had also been recovered.
