= History of Sega =

History of Japanese video game company

Sega's logo since 1975

The history of Sega, a Japanese multinational video game and entertainment company, has roots tracing back to American Standard Games in 1940 and Service Games of Japan in the 1950s. It originated as Nihon Goraku Bussan (Note: Japanese: 日本娯楽物産株式会社, Hepburn: Nihon goraku bussan kabushiki gaisha; Japanese Amusement Products Co., Ltd.), which became known as Sega Enterprises, Ltd. (Note: Japanese: 株式会社セガ・エンタープライゼズ, Hepburn: Kabushiki gaisha Sega Entapuraizezu) following the acquisition of Rosen Enterprises in 1965. Originally an importer of coin-operated arcade games to Japan and manufacturer of slot machines and jukeboxes, Sega began developing its own arcade games in 1966 with Periscope, which became a surprise success and led to more arcade machine development. In 1969, Gulf and Western Industries (then-owner of Paramount Pictures) bought Sega, which continued its arcade game business through the 1970s.

In response to a downturn in the arcade-game market in the early 1980s, Sega began to develop video game consoles—starting with the SG-1000 and Master System—but struggled against competing products such as the Nintendo Entertainment System. Around the same time, Sega executives David Rosen and Hayao Nakayama executed a management buyout of the company from Gulf and Western, with backing from CSK Corporation. Sega released its next console, the Sega Genesis (known as the Mega Drive outside North America) in 1988. Although it initially struggled, the Genesis became a major success after the release of Sonic the Hedgehog in 1991. Sega's marketing strategy, particularly in North America, helped the Genesis outsell main competitor Nintendo and their Super Nintendo Entertainment System for four consecutive Christmas seasons in the early 1990s. While the Game Gear and Sega CD achieved less, Sega's arcade business was also successful into the mid 1990s.

Sega had commercial failures in the second half of the decade with the 32X, Saturn, and Dreamcast, as the company's market strategy changed and console newcomer Sony became dominant with the PlayStation, in addition to further competition from Nintendo. Sega's arcade business, on the other hand, continued to be successful with arcade revenues increasing during the late 1990s, despite the arcade industry struggling in the West as home consoles became more popular than arcades. A merger was attempted with toy company Bandai during this time, but failed (Bandai would later merge with Sega's rival, Namco, in 2005). Following five years of losses, Sega exited the console hardware market in 2001 and became a third-party developer and publisher. In 2001, Sega CEO and CSK chairman Isao Okawa died; his will forgave Sega's debts to him and returned his stock to the company, which helped Sega endure the transition financially.

In 2004, Sammy Corporation purchased a controlling interest in Sega through a takeover, establishing the holding company Sega Sammy Holdings. Chairman Hajime Satomi announced that Sega would focus on its then-recovering arcade business and less on console games, returning the company to better profits. Sega has since been restructured again, with the establishment of Sega Holdings Co., Ltd. and the separation of its divisions into separate companies. Recent years have seen the company achieving greater success in console games and parting with a number of its arcade divisions, though Sega continues to be prevalent in the sector through licence agreements and the remaining games that are still developed for Japan.

== Company origins and arcade success (1940–1982) ==
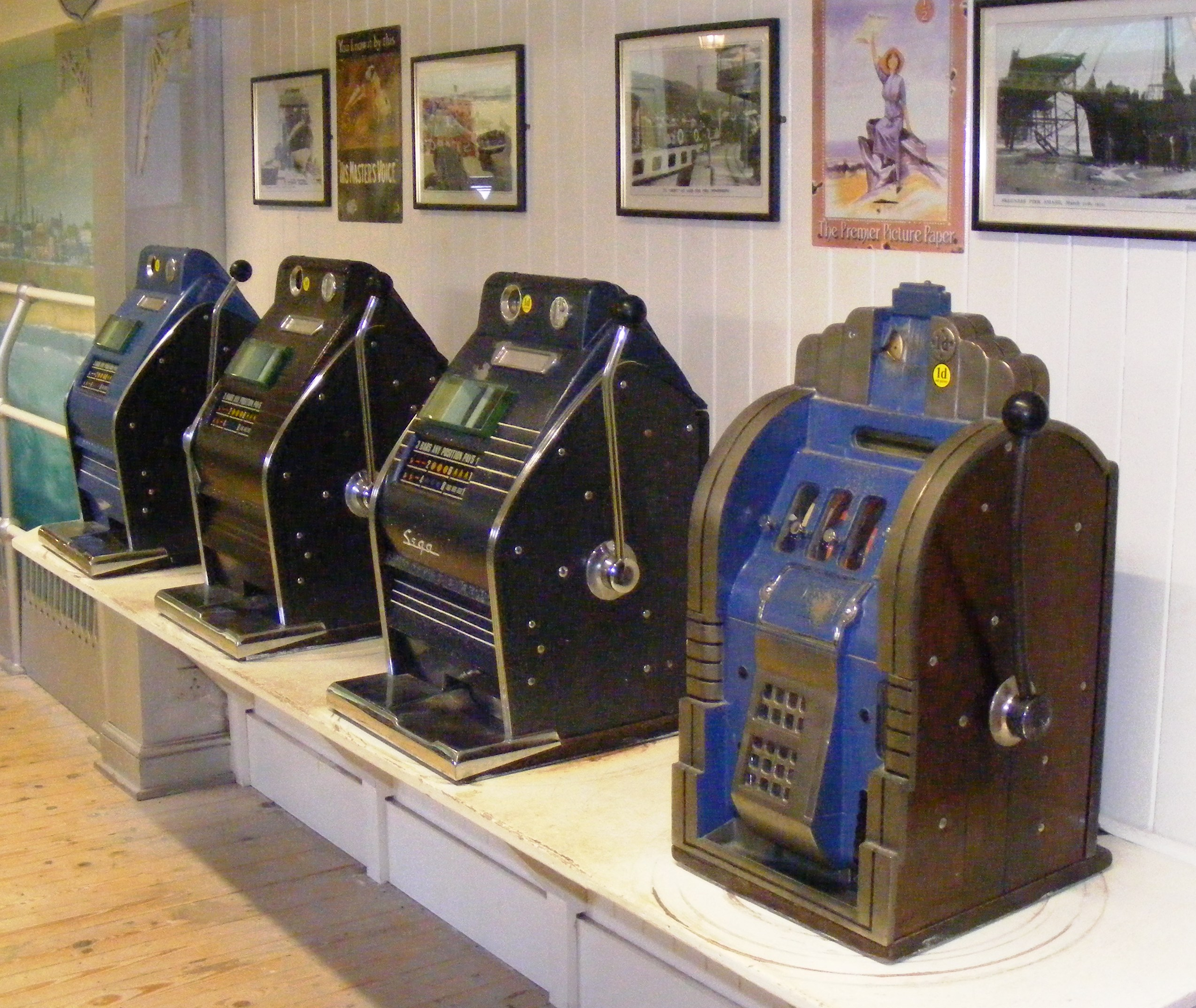
Sega Diamond 3 Star

=== Service Games and Nihon Goraku Bussan ===
The businessman Irving Bromberg had been a major player in coin-op distribution since establishing the Irving Bromberg Company in New York in 1931. His son Martin Bromley joined the business after graduating high school. They saw that the onset of World War II, and the consequent increase in the number of military personnel, would mean there would be demand for something for those stationed at military bases to do in their leisure time. In 1940, Bromberg, Bromley, and family friend James Humpert formed Standard Games in Honolulu, Hawaii, to provide coin-operated amusement machines to military bases. In May 1945, Bromberg, Bromley, and Humpert established a second Hawaiian coin-op distributor called "California Games", and they subsequently dissolved Standard Games that August. California Games was likewise terminated the next year, after which the trio established "Service Games" to replace it on September 1, 1946. At the time, the United States Army ceased operating slot machines and sold its inventory to Bromley. Service Games then restored the machines and sold them. In 1951 the Transportation of Gambling Devices Act outlawed slot machines in US territories, so Bromley sent two of his employees, Richard Stewart and Ray LeMaire, to Tokyo, Japan, in 1952 to establish a new distributor. Initially operating under a few different names such as "LeMaire and Stewart", the company provided coin-operated slot machines to U.S. bases in Japan and changed its name to "Service Games of Japan" by 1953.

A year later, all five men established "Service Games Panama" to control its various entities. The company expanded over the next seven years to include distribution in South Korea, the Philippines, and South Vietnam. Service Games Panama was equally owned by all five men, and purchased coin-operated machines from Chicago-based Gottlieb and Bally Manufacturing for distribution. The name "Sega", an abbreviation of "Service Games", was first used in 1954 on the Diamond Star Machine, a slot machine. During 1954 Humpert sold his interest in Service Games back to Bromley and Bromberg at a price of US$50,000 each. Stewart and LeMaire later purchased shares from Bromley and Bromberg, resulting in an equal split among the four men for ownership of the company. Over the next seven years, Service Games continued to grow.

As Service Games expanded, it began to attract attention from the US and Japanese governments. While the company had managed to get out of charges of bribery and tax evasion, between 1959 and 1960, Service Games was banned from US air bases in Japan and the Philippines. On May 31, 1960, Service Games of Japan was formally dissolved. A few days later, on June 3, two new companies were established to take over its business activities: Nihon Goraku Bussan and Nihon Kikai Seizō. (Note: Japanese: 日本機械製造株式会社, Hepburn: Nihon kikai seizō kabushiki gaisha; Japanese Machine Manufacturers Co., Ltd.) Kikai Seizō, doing business as Sega, Inc., focused on manufacturing slot machines, while Goraku Bussan, doing business under Stewart as Utamatic, Inc., served as a distributor and operator of coin-operated machines, particularly jukeboxes. As part of the operations move, the two new companies purchased Service Games of Japan's assets. Bromberg and Bromley sold Service Games Hawaii in 1961 for a price of US$1.4 million, while retaining the name. Kikai Seizō and Goraku Bussan merged in 1964.

=== Rosen Enterprises Ltd. ===
David Rosen, an American officer in the United States Air Force stationed in Japan, started Rosen Enterprises Ltd. after the Korean War. According to Rosen, he saw that the Japanese required photos for identification, rice ration cards, and employment. Because of this, he came up with an idea to import automated photo booths from the US to Japan and adapt them for use for these purposes. Rosen's business began in Tokyo in 1954. By 1957, Rosen recognized that there was disposable income available in the Japanese economy, as well as an increase in leisure time in the Japanese culture. He began importing coin-operated games to Japan, particularly focusing on hunting and shooting games.

Rosen stated that he had to acquire a license from Japan's Ministry of Industrial Trade and Industry to import games, and that he had to pay a 200% duty on his imported machines, plus duties on the shipping. As a result, importing games cost three times the cost of the machine. Despite this, Rosen says his machines made enough to pay for their cost within two months of operation because of how many plays they were receiving. He also claims that at his company's height, not a single Japanese city did not have one of his arcades there, and that he had a virtual monopoly for approximately two years. Later, Rosen had competition in the form of Taito and Nihon Goraku Bussan.

=== Merger and transition to manufacturer ===
In 1965, Nihon Goraku Bussan acquired Rosen's company to form Sega Enterprises, Ltd., although Rosen has called it a "merger". Rosen was installed as the CEO and managing director of the new company. According to Rosen, "Sega" was the brand name that Nihon Goraku Bussan was using, and that the decision was made to name the company with the most recognized name upon the merger, while the word "Enterprises" came from Rosen Enterprises. Shortly afterward, Sega stopped its focus on slot machines and stopped leasing to military bases to focus on becoming a publicly traded company of coin-operated amusement machines. Products imported included Rock-Ola jukeboxes and pinball games by Williams, as well as gun games by Midway Manufacturing.

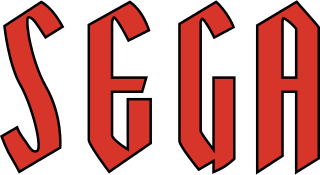
Sega Enterprises, Ltd.'s logo, used until 1975

Because Sega imported second-hand machines that frequently required maintenance, Sega began the transition from importer to manufacturer by constructing replacement guns and flippers for its imported games. According to former Sega director Akira Nagai, this led to Sega developing their own games as well. Sega's first release of their own manufactured electromechanical game was the submarine simulator game, Periscope. The game sported light and sound effects considered innovative for that time, eventually becoming quite successful in Japan. It was soon exported to both Europe and the United States and was placed in malls and department stores, becoming the first arcade game in the US to cost 25 cents per play. Sega was surprised by Periscope's success, and for the next two years, Sega produced between eight and ten games per year, exporting all of them. Despite this, rampant piracy in the industry would eventually lead to Sega stepping away from exporting its games. One such example occurred when Sega developed Jet Rocket. According to Rosen, after its American release in 1970, it was cloned by three Chicago manufacturers. This negatively affected the game's market performance.

=== Ownership by Gulf and Western and public company status ===
To advance the company, Rosen had a goal to take the company public, and decided this would be easier to accomplish in the United States than in Japan. Rosen was advised that this would be most easily accomplished through Sega being acquired by a larger company. In 1969, Sega was sold to American conglomerate Gulf and Western Industries. Bromley and Stewart sold their shares, 80% of the company, for a total of US$10 million, while LeMaire retained his 20%. As a condition of the sale, Rosen was to remain CEO of the company until at least 1972. According to Martin Bromley's daughter Lauran, her father—who was in his fifties at the time—and the other owners saw the sale as an opportunity to retire. Six months later, with the deal done, Bromley joined with Stewart to form a company called Sega S.A. (also known as Segasa and Sega/Sonic) in Spain, which imported coin-operated machines to Europe.

In 1970, Gulf and Western placed Rosen at the head of a new company called Gulf and Western Far East Pacific headquartered in Hong Kong. Sega Enterprises, Ltd. became a subsidiary of this new company, which Gulf and Western chairman Charles Bluhdorn hoped would become a powerful Asian conglomerate (though this hope would never come to fruition). Rosen, however, continued to develop his relationship with Bluhdorn, who took Sega Enterprises Ltd. public in the United States in 1974 by making it a subsidiary of an existing publicly traded corporation owned by Gulf and Western called the Polly Bergen Company. Rosen was appointed CEO of Polly Bergen, which was renamed Sega Enterprises, Inc. Sega Enterprises, Ltd. executive vice president Harry Kane took control of day-to-day operations at the Japanese subsidiary. In July 1975, Sega Enterprises, Inc. opened a new North American sales and manufacturing subsidiary called Sega of America in Redondo Beach, California. Kane took charge of this subsidiary in 1976 and was replaced in Japan by a new executive vice president named Dane Blough.

=== Arcade expansion and success ===
At the end of 1970, Sega opened a 125-game arcade center in Sapporo. During the opening, Sega announced a partnership with Toho Films—which had produced Godzilla—for a joint venture of arcades, with a 70-game arcade to open in Nagasaki in January. These "family fun centers" began a business of arcade operation in Japan which Sega continued until January 2022. During 1973, Sega would release Pong-Tron, its first video-based game. In North America in 1975, Sega purchased a 50 percent stake in Kingdom of Oz, a company that operated arcades in California shopping malls. Sega took full control by March 1976 with all arcades becoming Sega Centers, and announced more centers to open in California in June 1977. Following the model set forth by Chuck E. Cheese, created by Atari founder Nolan Bushnell, Sega opened its first P.J. Pizzazz, a "family entertainment center", in West Covina, California in June 1980.

Despite late competition from Taito's hit arcade game Space Invaders in 1978, Sega profited heavily from the arcade gaming boom of the late 1970s, with revenues climbing to over US$100 million by 1979. During this period, Sega acquired Gremlin Industries, a manufacturer of microprocessor-based arcade games, and operated as Sega/Gremlin after the acquisition. In 1979, Sega also acquired Esco Boueki (Esco Trading), founded and owned by Hayao Nakayama. This brought Nakayama into Sega Enterprises, Ltd., where he was named executive vice president and shared leadership responsibilities with Dane Blough. Blough continued to run finance and administration, while Nakayama took charge of sales, marketing, and R&D. Rosen later admitted that he mainly purchased Esco Trading for Nakayama's leadership. In 1979, the company released Head On, which introduced the "eat the dots" gameplay Namco later used in Pac-Man. In 1981, Sega licensed and released Frogger, its most successful game until then. In 1982, Sega introduced the first game with isometric graphics, Zaxxon. In the early 1980s, Sega was one of the top five arcade game manufacturers active in the United States, as company revenues rose to $214 million. Around the end of 1981, Gulf and Western transferred Sega from the company's manufacturing division to motion picture studio Paramount Pictures, in an effort to get into the gaming business, and launched its home gaming division.

== Entry into the home console market and arcade resurgence (1982–1988) ==
=== Arcade industry crash and SG-1000 ===
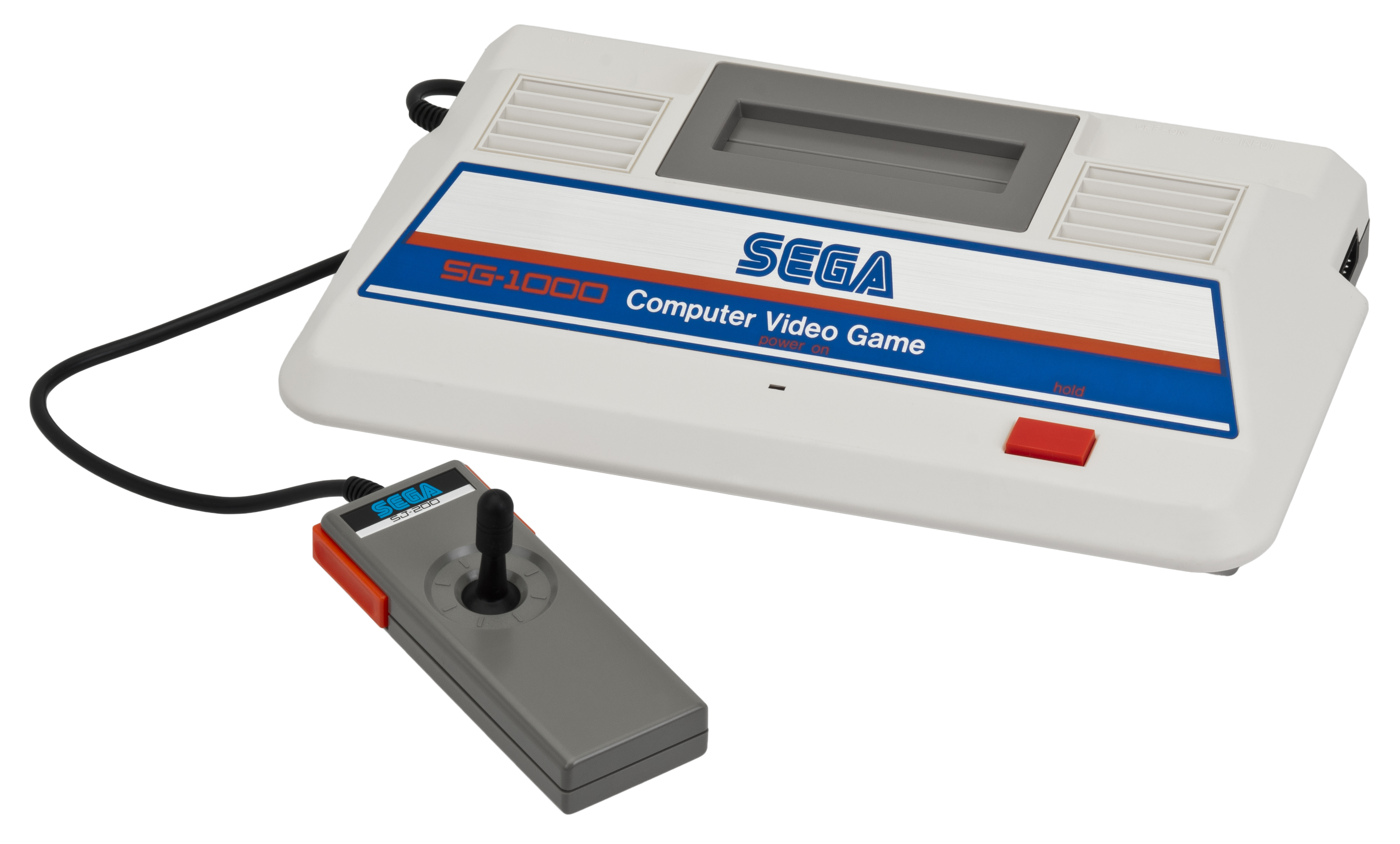
The SG-1000, Sega's first home video game console

Despite Sega's successes, Rosen was cautiously optimistic about the future in a December 1981 interview for Cashbox. He stated that he felt the growth of the industry was slowing and that expansion options were becoming more limited. He also spoke of Sega's focus on their Convert-a-Pak program, which allowed for new games to be installed in existing arcade cabinets in a matter of minutes. This was introduced on Sega's G80 arcade system board. Rosen took further actions in concern, including pushing the Gulf and Western board to buy out the minority shareholders of Sega, himself included, and advising at a distributor meeting that the industry needed to make major changes. Around the same time, Sega/Gremlin announced a name change to Sega Electronics, Inc. As Rosen predicted, a downturn in the arcade business starting in 1982 seriously hurt Sega, leading Gulf and Western to sell its North American arcade manufacturing organization and the licensing rights for its arcade games to Bally. The company retained Sega's North American R&D operation, as well as its Japanese subsidiary, Sega Enterprises, Ltd. Sega Centers were sold to the Time-Out arcade chain, and all of the P.J. Pizzazz locations were closed.

With its arcade business in decline, Sega Enterprises, Ltd. president Nakayama advocated that the company leverage its hardware expertise to move into the home console market in Japan, which was in its infancy at the time. Nakayama received permission to proceed, leading to the release of Sega's first home video game system, the SG-1000. The first model to be developed was the SC-3000, a computer version with a built-in keyboard, but when Sega learned of Nintendo's plans to release a games-only console, they began developing the SG-1000 alongside the SC-3000. The SG-1000 and SC-3000 were released in Japan on July 15, 1983, on the same day as Nintendo launched the Family Computer (Famicom) in Japan. Though Sega only released the SG-1000 in Japan, rebranded versions were released in several other markets worldwide. Due in part to the SG-1000's steadier stream of releases, and in part to a recall on Famicom units necessitated by a faulty circuit, the SG-1000 chalked up 160,000 units in sales in 1983, far exceeding Sega's projection of 50,000 units. By 1984, the Famicom's success began to outpace the SG-1000, in part because Nintendo boosted its games library by courting third-party developers, whereas Sega was less than eager to collaborate with the same companies they were competing with in arcades.

In November 1983, Rosen announced his intention to step down as president of Sega Enterprises, Inc. on January 1, 1984, though he would remain with the company in a consulting role. His statement to Sega's board of directors indicated a desire to pursue other interests and investments. Jeffrey Rochlis was announced as the new president and COO of Sega. Rosen cited Sega's new licensing deal with Bally as part of Sega "entering a new era".

=== Management buyout and Master System ===
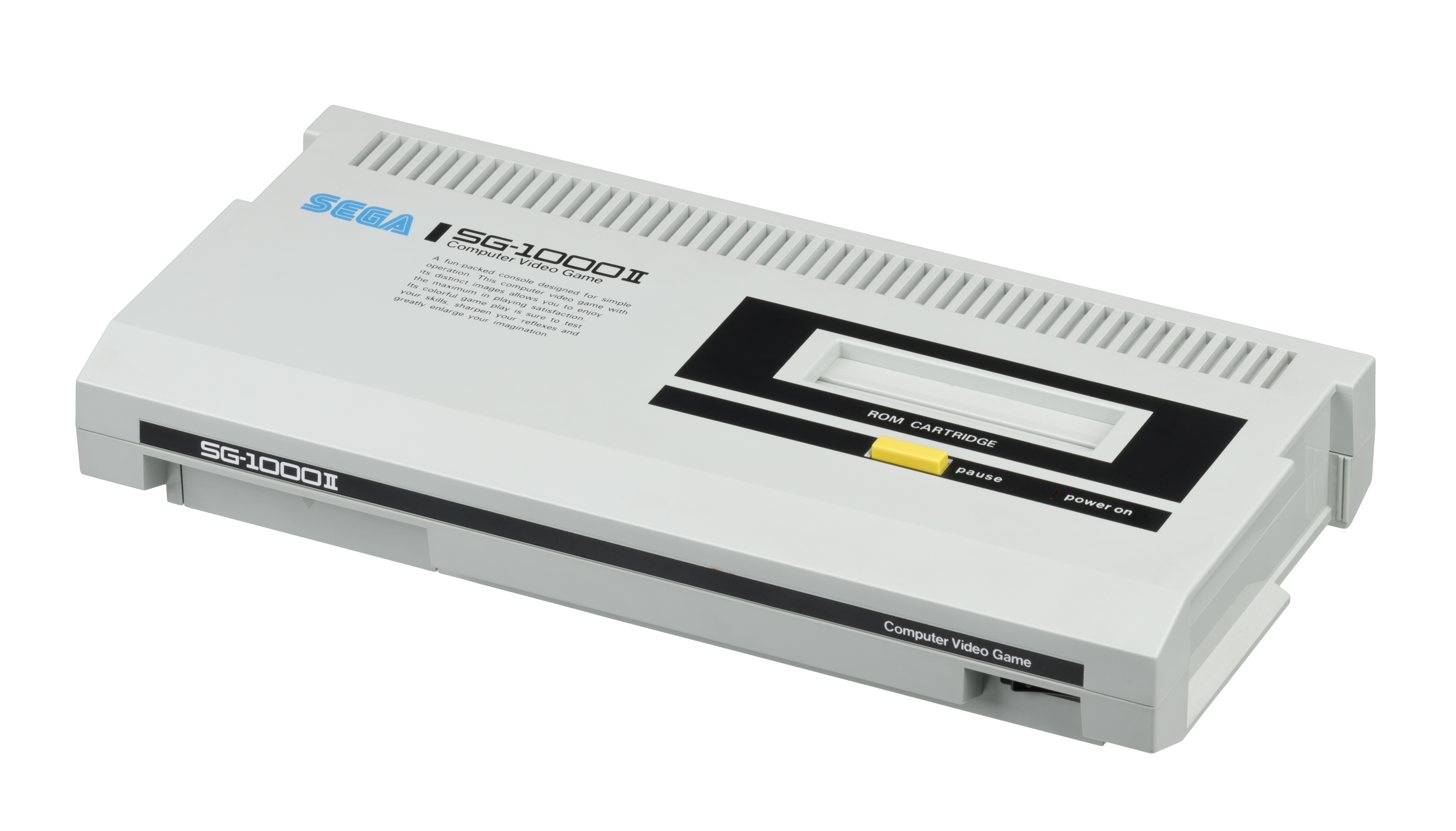
Sega released the SG-1000 II in 1984

Shortly after the launch of the SG-1000, Gulf and Western began to divest itself of its non-core businesses after the death of Bluhdorn. At the time, Gulf and Western owned 91 percent of Sega Enterprises, Inc. Nakayama and Rosen arranged a management buyout of the Japanese subsidiary in 1984 with financial backing from CSK Corporation, a prominent Japanese software company. The Japanese assets of Sega were purchased for $38 million by a group of investors led by Rosen and Nakayama. Isao Okawa, chairman of CSK, became the chairman of Sega, while Nakayama was installed as CEO of Sega Enterprises, Ltd. Following the buyout, Sega released another console, the SG-1000 II, on July 31, 1984. The SG-1000 II replaced the hardwired joystick with two detachable joypads.

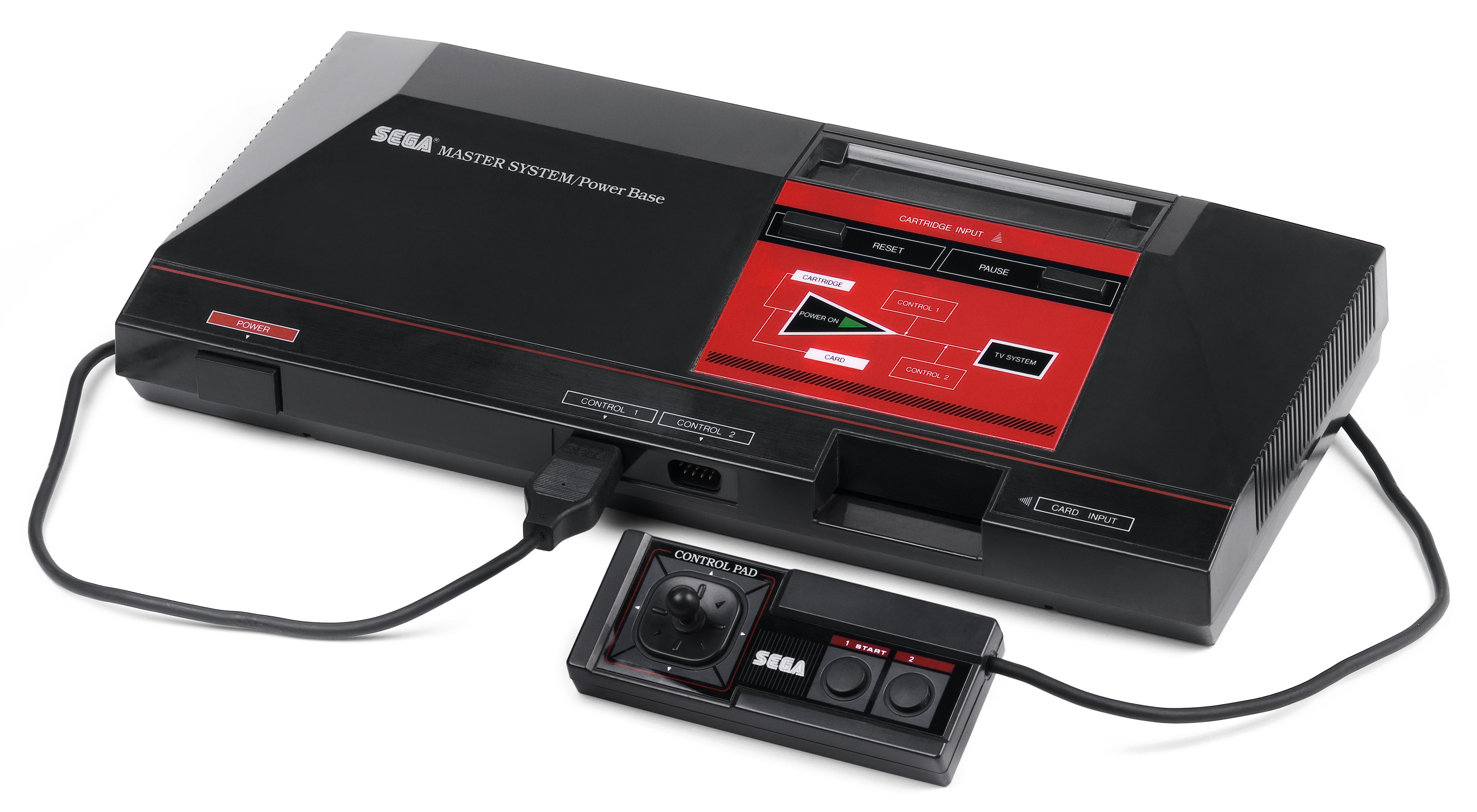
The Master System, released in North America in 1986 and Europe in 1987

As a result of the lack of success of the SG-1000, Sega began working on the Mark III in Japan in 1985. Engineered by the same internal Sega team that had created the SG-1000, the Mark III was a redesigned iteration of the previous console. For the console's North America release, Sega restyled and rebranded the Mark III under the name "Master System". The futuristic final design for the Master System was intended to appeal to Western tastes. The Sega Mark III was released in Japan in October 1985 at a price of ¥15,000. Despite featuring technically more powerful hardware than its chief competition, the Famicom, the Mark III did not prove to be successful at its launch. Difficulties arose from Nintendo's licensing practices with third-party developers at the time, whereby Nintendo required that games for the Famicom not be published on other consoles. To overcome this, Sega developed its own games and obtained the rights to port games from other developers, but they did not sell well.

By early 1992, Master System production ceased in North America. By the time of its discontinuation, Master System had sold between 1.5 million and 2 million units in the United States, finishing behind both Nintendo and Atari. Sales in the United States were handicapped by ineffective marketing by Tonka, who marketed the console on behalf of Sega in the United States. As late as 1993, the Master System's active installed user base in Europe was 6.25 million units. The Master System has had continued success in Brazil, where new variations have continued to be released, long after the console was discontinued elsewhere, distributed by Sega's partner in the region, Tectoy. By 2016, Tec Toy had sold a combined 8 million units of the original Master System and various emulation-based successors in Brazil.

=== Opening of new worldwide divisions ===
During 1984, Sega opened its European division. While Sega was not initially considering expansion into Europe, the company reconsidered after being contacted by Victor Leslie, a coin-op seller in the United Kingdom. Leslie was placed in charge of a new Sega office in London, to be named Sega Europe Ltd. Sega Europe would be the company's marketing base on the continent.

Sega re-entered the North American arcade market in 1985 with the establishment of another new division at the end of a deal with Bally. With Sega Electronics, Inc. no longer in existence, Rosen and Nakayama hired Gene Lipkin to head the new division, Sega Enterprises USA, based in San Jose, California. Lipkin had previously worked for Atari and Exidy. Lipkin's new sales team head, Tom Petit, had previously worked for Nintendo and Data East. The new subsidiary started with 22 employees, US$500,000 in start-up revenue, and operated out of Lipkin's old employer's facilities until Sega's new facility was ready in August 1985. In May 1986, Lipkin resigned for personal reasons; Petit eventually took control of the division. Sega Enterprises USA held a rivalry with Sega Europe, as the North American division quickly outgrew the European one.

In 1986, Sega of America was established to manage the company's consumer products in North America. Rosen and Nakayama hired Bruce Lowry, Nintendo of America's vice president of sales. Lowry was persuaded to change companies because Sega would allow him to start his new office in San Francisco. He chose the name "Sega of America" for his division because he had worked for Nintendo of America and liked the combination of words. Initially, Sega of America was tasked with repackaging the Master System for a Western release, although distribution of the console would later be given to Tonka. During this time, much of Sega of America's new infrastructure was temporarily shut down.

=== Success with arcade resurgence ===
In 1985, Sega released Hang-On, a motorcycle racing game programmed by Yu Suzuki under the Studio 128 development group. Offering advanced pseudo-3D "Super Scaler" graphics, the game was highly successful, to the extent that Sega struggled to keep up with resultant demand. This was followed by the similar Out Run (1986), which expanded on the conventions set in place by Hang-On. Its arcade release received positive reviews and became one of the most popular arcade games of the year, also winning the Golden Joystick Award for Game of the Year.

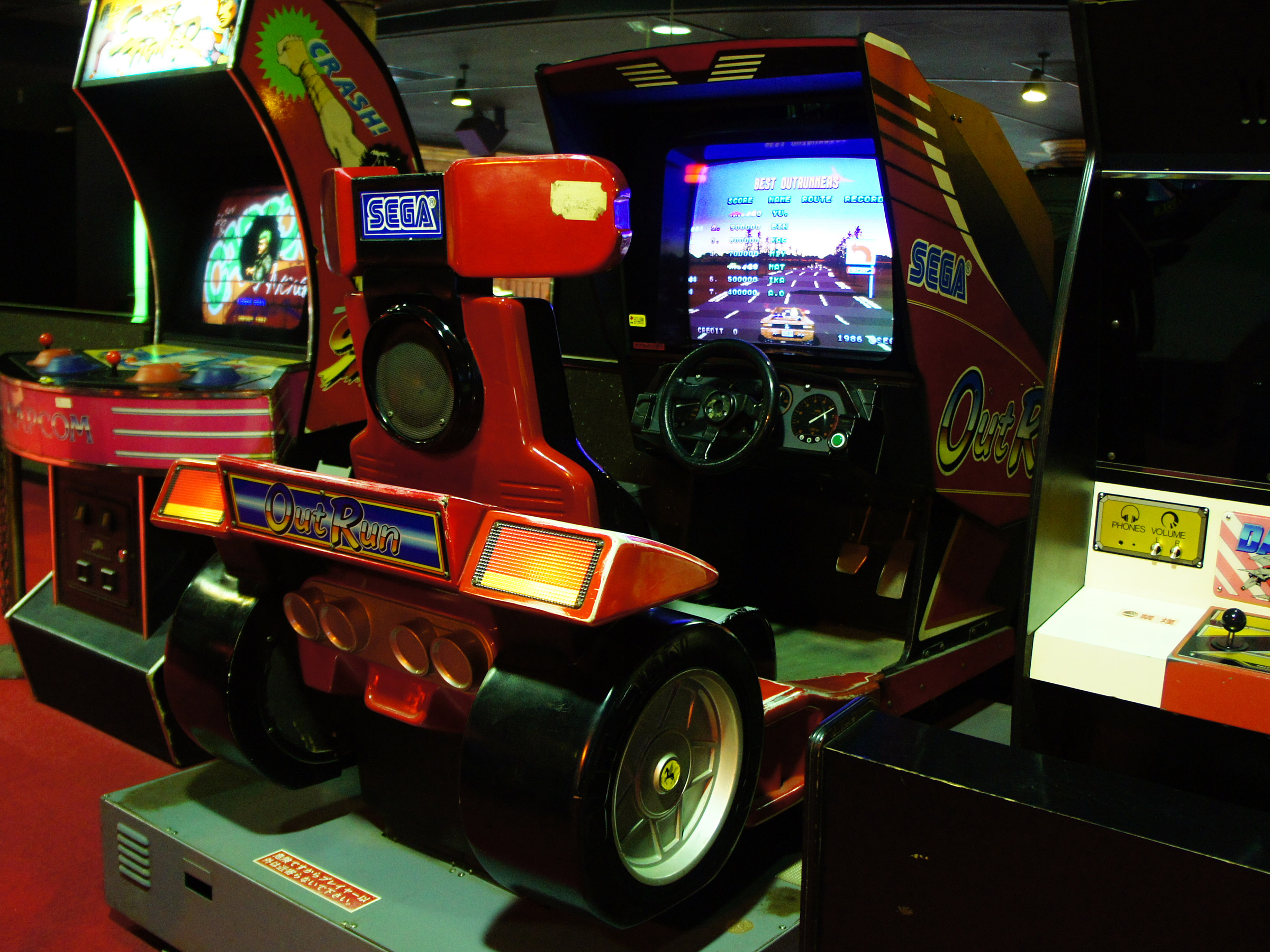
Deluxe "taikan" cabinet of Out Run, released to arcades in 1986 by Sega (pictured in 2011)

Though both games were made available as stand-up cabinets, a significant part of their success was their bespoke deluxe forms, referred to by Sega officially as "Taikan games" (体感ゲーム). Roughly translating to "bodily sensation" or "experience", the namesake referred to their eye-catching motion-based control scheme and hydraulic simulation movement, using rideable motorbike and car models. Former Sega arcade director Akira Nagai has credited Hang-On and Out Run as the releases that helped to bring arcades out of the 1982 downturn and created new genres of games. In the following years, Sega would release multiple other successful games based on the taikan template, including Space Harrier and After Burner, as well as the first version of its popular UFO Catcher claw crane game. In 1987, Sega sold over 40,000 arcade machines worldwide.

As well as the rebound in arcade game profits caused by its creative uptick, Sega saw success in operating its own arcades in both Japan and the US during the mid 1980s. In the former country, its first officially branded game centers opened under the "Hi-Tech Land" and "Hi-Tech Sega" chains. The openings came after the creation of the fueiho law and the amusement industry's "3K Cleanup Campaign", which attempted to dispel the "kurai, kowai, and kitanai" (dark, scary and dirty) aspects of the venues. Similarly, Sega's Time-Out chain of arcades established through the December 1986 acquisition of the Time-Out Family Amusement Inc. company in the US followed on from previous venues opened in the 1970s.

Alongside similar branded chains by competitors like Taito, the venues in both countries followed the trajectory previously set in place to make amusement arcades cleaner and more socially acceptable, installing features such as toilets for both men and women, lighting systems, and smoking areas. Sega's success in arcades kept the company afloat whilst its home consumer endeavours struggled, though the Time-Out chain in the US would later be sold during 1990 as a result of changing conditions in the amusement industry.

== Sega Genesis/Mega Drive and mainstream success (1988–1994) ==
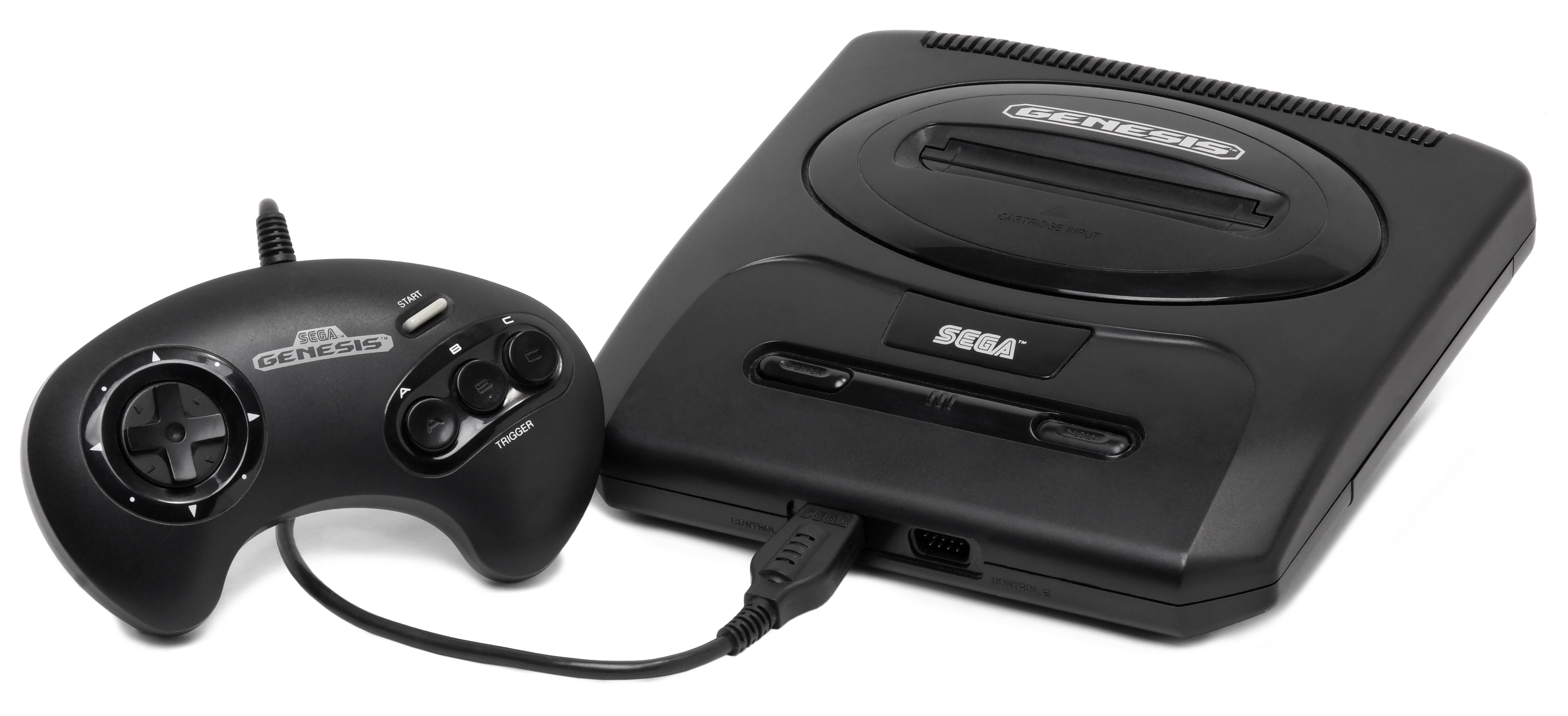
Sega Genesis, second North American version

Sega released the Master System's successor, the Mega Drive, in Japan on October 29, 1988, though the launch was overshadowed by Nintendo's release of Super Mario Bros. 3 a week earlier. Positive coverage from magazines Famitsu and Beep! helped to establish a following, but Sega only managed to ship 400,000 units in the first year. The Mega Drive was unable to overtake the venerable Famicom and remained a distant third in Japan behind Nintendo's Super Famicom and NEC's PC Engine throughout the 16-bit era. Sega announced a North American release date for the system on January 9, 1989. At the time, Sega did not possess a North American sales and marketing organization for its consoles, but ultimately decided to launch the console through its own Sega of America subsidiary, which launched later that year.

For the North American market, where the console was renamed "Sega Genesis", former Atari executive and new Sega of America CEO Michael Katz instituted a two-part approach to build sales in the region. The first part involved a marketing campaign to challenge Nintendo head-on and emphasize the more arcade-like experience available on the Genesis, summarized by slogans including "Genesis does what Nintendon't". Since Nintendo owned the console rights to most arcade games of the time, the second part involved creating a library of instantly recognizable games which used the names and likenesses of celebrities and athletes. Nonetheless, it had a hard time overcoming Nintendo's ubiquitous presence in consumers' homes. Tasked by Nakayama to sell one million units within the first year, Katz and Sega of America managed to sell only 500,000 units.

=== Sonic the Hedgehog ===
Sonic the Hedgehog has been Sega's mascot since the character's introduction in 1991.

While Sega was seeking a flagship series to compete with Nintendo's Mario series along with a character to serve as a company mascot, Naoto Ohshima designed "a teal hedgehog with red shoes." This character won the contest and was renamed Sonic the Hedgehog, spawning one of the best-selling video game franchises in history. The gameplay of Sonic the Hedgehog originated with a tech demo created by Yuji Naka, who had developed an algorithm that allowed a sprite to move smoothly on a curve by determining its position with a dot matrix. Naka's original prototype was a platform game that involved a fast-moving character rolling in a ball through a long winding tube, and this concept was subsequently fleshed out with Ohshima's character design and levels conceived by designer Hirokazu Yasuhara. Sonic's blue pigmentation was chosen to match Sega's cobalt blue logo, and his shoes were a concept evolved from a design inspired by Michael Jackson's boots with the addition of the color red, which was inspired by both Santa Claus and the contrast of those colors on Jackson's 1987 album Bad; his personality was based on Bill Clinton's "can do" attitude.

=== Marketing strategy and success ===
In mid-1990, Nakayama hired Tom Kalinske to replace Katz as CEO of Sega of America. Although Kalinske initially knew little about the video game market, he surrounded himself with industry-savvy advisors. A believer in the razor and blades business model, he developed a four-point plan: cut the price of the console, create a U.S.-based team to develop games targeted at the American market, continue and expand the aggressive advertising campaigns, and replace the bundled game Altered Beast with a new game, Sonic the Hedgehog. The Japanese board of directors initially disapproved of the plan, but all four points were approved by Nakayama, who told Kalinske, "I hired you to make the decisions for Europe and the Americas, so go ahead and do it." Magazines praised Sonic as one of the greatest games yet made, and Sega's console finally became successful. In large part due to the popularity of Sonic the Hedgehog, the Sega Genesis outsold its main competitor, Nintendo's SNES, in the United States nearly two to one during the 1991 holiday season. This success led to Sega having control of 65% of the 16-bit console market in January 1992, making it the first time Nintendo was not the console leader since December 1985.

To compete with Nintendo, Sega was more open to new types of games than its rival, but still tightly controlled the approval process for third-party games and charged high prices for cartridge manufacturing. Technicians from American third-party video game publisher Electronic Arts (EA) reverse engineered the Genesis in 1989, following nearly one year of negotiations with Sega in which EA requested a more liberal licensing agreement than was standard in the industry before releasing its games for the system. As a result, EA signed what founder Trip Hawkins described as "a very unusual and much more enlightened license agreement" with Sega in June 1990: "Among other things, we had the right to make as many titles as we wanted. We could approve our own titles ... the royalty rates were a lot more reasonable. We also had more direct control over manufacturing." The first Genesis version of EA's John Madden Football arrived before the end of 1990, and became what EA creative officer Bing Gordon called a "killer app" for the system.

Another issue Sega had to deal with in marketing the Genesis in North America was Nintendo's dominance with retailers. Major retail stores such as Wal-Mart, Target, and Kmart had all refused to carry the Genesis in their stores. To get Wal-Mart to carry the system, Kalinske advertised the system heavily in Bentonville, Arkansas, where Wal-Mart's home office is located. Tactics used in the area included renting billboards, radio advertisements, sports stadiums, and renting a store in the local mall. This resulted in Wal-Mart relenting and choosing to carry the Genesis.

Sega was able to outsell Nintendo four Christmas seasons in a row due to the Genesis' head start, a lower price point, and a larger library of games when compared to the Super Nintendo at its release. Sega's advertising positioned the Genesis as the cooler console, and as its advertising evolved, the company coined the term "blast processing" to suggest that its processing capabilities were far greater than those of the SNES. According to a 2004 study of NPD sales data, the Sega Genesis was able to maintain its lead over the Super NES in the American 16-bit console market. However, according to a 2014 Wedbush Securities report based on revised NPD sales data, the SNES outsold the Genesis in the U.S. market.

=== Sega v. Accolade ===
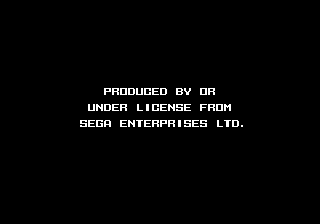
The screen displayed by the Trademark Security System (TMSS)

After the release of the Sega Genesis in 1989, video game publisher Accolade began exploring options to release some of their PC games on the console. At the time, Sega had a licensing deal in place for third-party developers that increased the costs to the developer. According to Accolade co-founder Alan Miller, "One pays them between $10 and $15 per cartridge on top of the real hardware manufacturing costs, so it about doubles the cost of goods to the independent publisher." To get around licensing, Accolade chose to seek an alternative way to bring their games to the Genesis. As a result of piracy in some countries and unlicensed development issues, Sega incorporated a technical protection mechanism into a new edition of the Genesis released in 1990, referred to as the Genesis III. This new variation of the Genesis included a code known as the Trademark Security System (TMSS). Accolade successfully identified the TMSS file. It later added this file to the games HardBall!, Star Control, Mike Ditka Power Football, and Turrican. In response to the creation of these unlicensed games, Sega filed suit against Accolade in the United States District Court for the Northern District of California, on charges of trademark infringement, unfair competition, and copyright infringement. In response, Accolade filed a counterclaim for falsifying the source of its games by displaying the Sega trademark when the game was powered up. Despite winning an injunction in the initial district court case, as a result of Accolade's appeal, the Ninth Circuit overturned the district court's verdict and ruled that Accolade's decompilation of the Sega software constituted fair use. Ultimately, Sega and Accolade settled the case on April 30, 1993. As a part of this settlement, Accolade became an official licensee of Sega, and later developed and released Barkley Shut Up and Jam! while under license. The terms of the licensing, including whether or not any special arrangements or discounts were made to Accolade, were not released to the public. The financial terms of the settlement were also not disclosed, although both companies agreed to pay their own legal costs.

=== 1993 United States congressional hearings ===
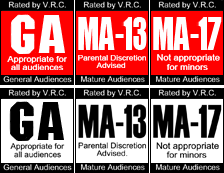
Ratings issued by Sega's Videogame Rating Council

In 1993, the American media began to focus on the mature content of certain video games. Games such as Night Trap for the Sega CD, an add-on, received unprecedented scrutiny. Issues about Night Trap were brought up in the United Kingdom, with former Sega of Europe development director Mike Brogan noting that "Night Trap got Sega an awful lot of publicity ... it was also cited in UK Parliament for being classified as "15" due to its use of real actors." This came at a time when Sega was capitalizing on its image as an edgy company with attitude, and this only reinforced that image. By far the year's most controversial game was Midway's Mortal Kombat, ported to the Genesis and SNES by Acclaim. In response to public outcry over the game's graphic violence, Nintendo decided to replace the blood in the game with "sweat" and the arcade's gruesome "fatalities" with less violent finishing moves. Sega took a different approach, instituting America's first video game ratings system, the Videogame Rating Council (VRC), for all its current systems. Ratings ranged from the family friendly GA rating to the more mature rating of MA-13, and the adults-only rating of MA-17. With the rating system in place, Sega released its version of Mortal Kombat, appearing to have removed all the blood and sweat effects and toning down the finishing moves even more than in the SNES version. However, all the arcade's blood and uncensored finishing moves could be enabled by entering a "Blood Code". This technicality allowed Sega to release the game with a relatively low MA-13 rating. Meanwhile, the tamer SNES version shipped without a rating. The Genesis version of Mortal Kombat was well received by gaming press, as well as fans, outselling the SNES version three- or four-to-one, while Nintendo was criticized for censoring the SNES version of the game. Executive vice president of Nintendo of America Howard Lincoln was quick to point out in United States congressional hearings in 1993 that Night Trap had no such rating. In response, Sega of America vice president Bill White showed a videotape of violent video games on the SNES and stressed the importance of rating video games. At the end of the hearing, Senator Joe Lieberman called for another hearing in February 1994 to check on progress toward a rating system for video game violence. Although experiencing increased sales, Sega decided to recall Night Trap and re-release it with revisions in 1994 due to the Congressional hearings. After the close of these hearings, video game manufacturers came together to establish the rating system that Lieberman had called for. Initially, Sega proposed the universal adoption of its system, but after objections by Nintendo and others, Sega took a role in forming a new one. This became the Entertainment Software Rating Board, an independent organization that received praise from Lieberman.

=== Game Gear and Sega CD ===
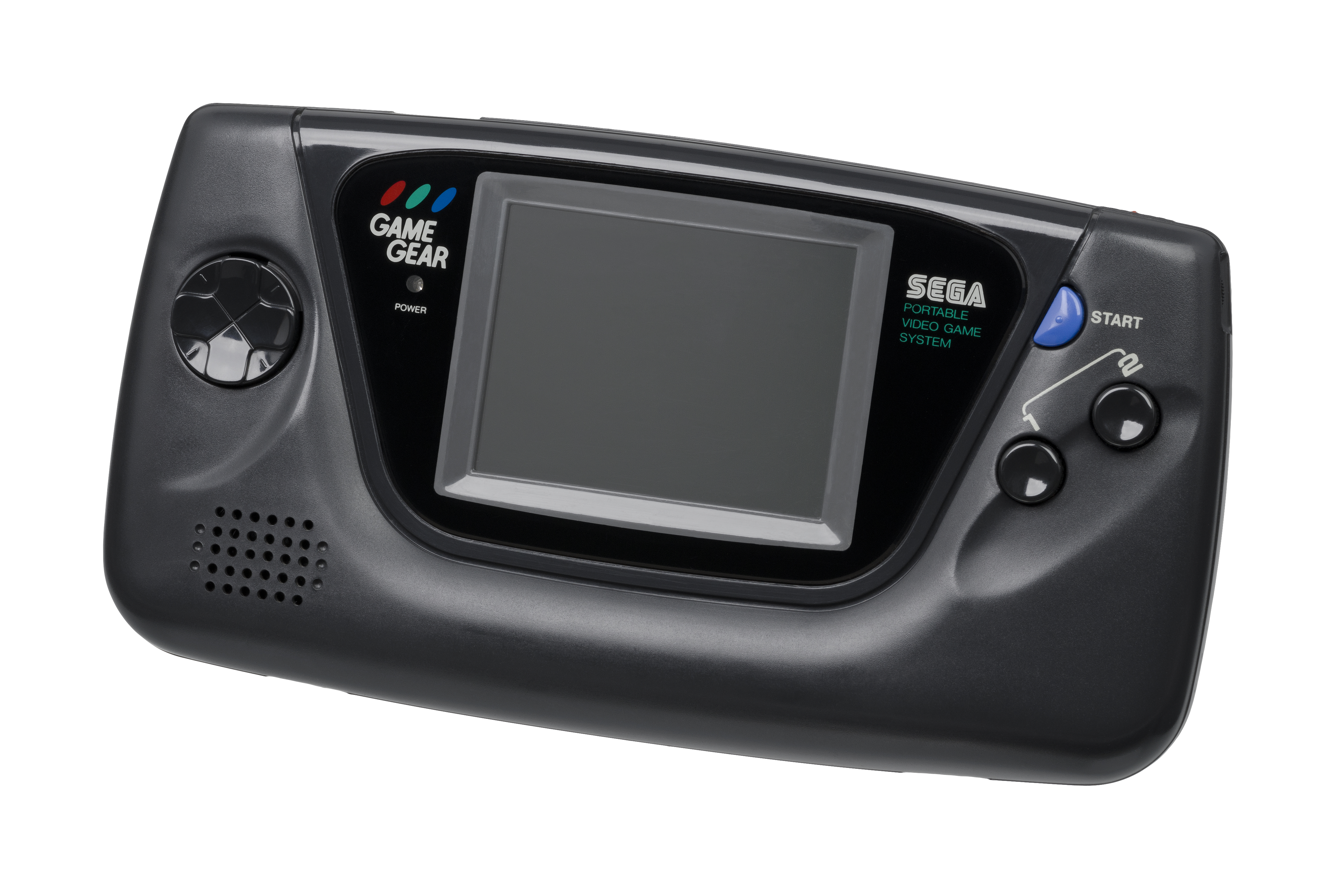
Sega's Game Gear struggled to compete against Nintendo's Game Boy.

In 1990, Sega launched the Game Gear to compete against Nintendo's Game Boy. The console had been designed as a portable version of the Master System, and featured more powerful systems than the Game Boy, including a full-color screen, in contrast to the monochromatic screen of its rival. Due to issues with its short battery life, lack of original games, and weak support from Sega, the Game Gear was unable to surpass the Game Boy, selling approximately 11 million units.

By 1991, compact discs (CDs) had gained in popularity as a data storage device for music and software. PCs and video game companies had started to make use of this technology. NEC had been the first to include CD technology in a game console with the release of the TurboGrafx-CD add-on, and Nintendo was making plans to develop its own CD peripheral as well. Seeing the opportunity to gain an advantage over its rivals, Sega partnered with JVC to develop a CD-ROM add-on for the Genesis. Sega launched the Mega-CD in Japan on December 1, 1991, initially retailing at JP¥49,800. The CD add-on was launched in North America on October 15, 1992, as the Sega CD, with a retail price of US$299; it was released in Europe as the Mega-CD in 1993. In addition to greatly expanding the potential size of its games, this add-on unit upgraded the graphics and sound capabilities by adding a second, more powerful processor, more system memory, and hardware-based scaling and rotation similar to that found in Sega's arcade games. The Mega-CD sold only 100,000 units during its first year in Japan, falling well below expectations. Although many consumers blamed the add-on's high launch price, it also suffered from a small software library; only two games were available at launch. This was due in part to the long delay before Sega made its software development kit available to third-party developers. Sales were more successful in North America and Europe, although the novelty of full motion video (FMV) and CD-enhanced games quickly wore off as many of the Sega CD's later games were met with lukewarm or negative reviews.

=== Continued arcade success ===
Sega experienced success with arcades during the years it was supporting the Genesis, making it one of the most recognised brands in both the home and out-of-home sectors of gaming in the early 1990s. In arcade game development, Sega focused on releasing games to appeal to diverse tastes, including racing games and side-scrollers. It developed over 40 games for its System 16 arcade system board, and saw success in Japan with its line of medal games. Some time after the release of Power Drift, Sega realigned its arcade development divisions into the Amusement Machine Research and Development teams, or AM teams, which were strictly segregated and often had rivalries with each other and with the consumer development divisions. During this time, the AM5 division was formed to create larger amusement equipment, with its first projects including the "Waku Waku" line of children's rides. Sega's advanced know-how garnered from the "taikan" experience games in the 1980s led to more complex machines; its AS-1 and R360 simulators offered unparalleled but highly expensive immersion.

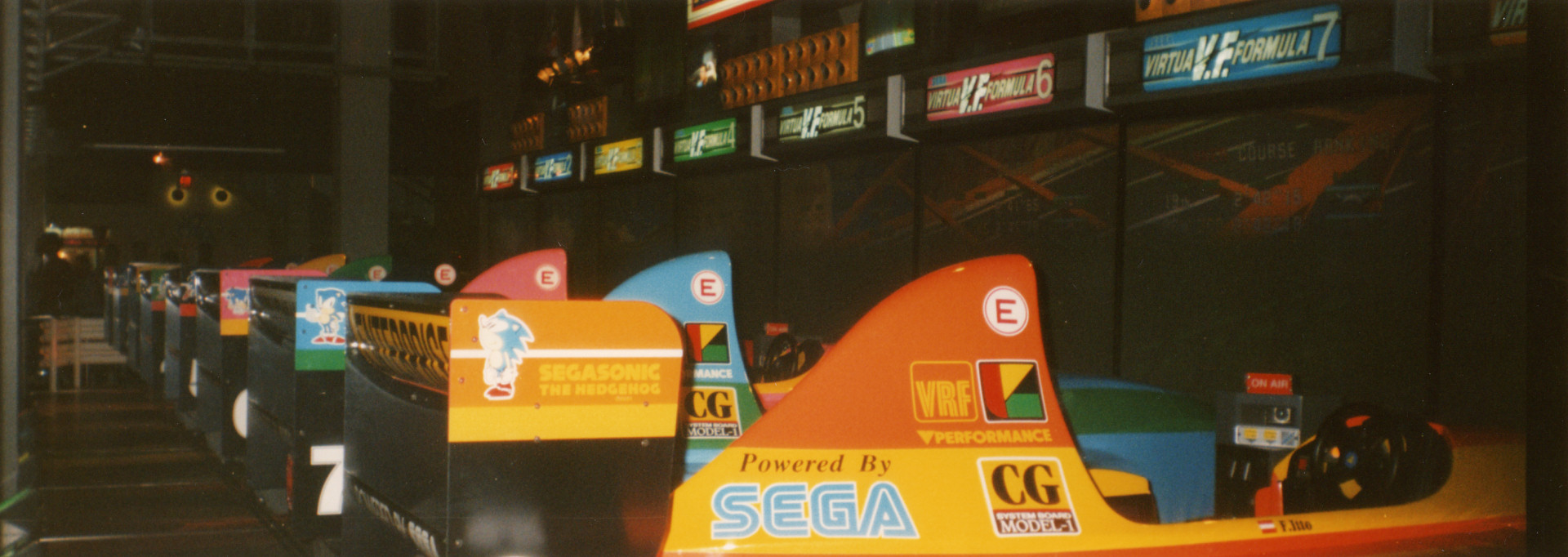
Virtua Formula installation at the Sega VirtuaLand arcade in the Luxor Las Vegas hotel in 1993

In 1992 and 1993, the new Model 1 arcade system board ran Sega AM2's Virtua Racing and Virtua Fighter (the first 3D fighting game), which played crucial roles in popularizing 3D polygonal graphics and took the place of Sega's line of sprite-based "Super Scaler" games. Virtua Fighter was praised for its simple three-button control scheme, with strategy coming from the intuitively observed differences between characters that felt and acted differently rather than the more ornate combos of two-dimensional competitors. Despite its crude visuals—with characters composed of fewer than 1,200 polygons—Virtua Fighter's fluid animation and relatively realistic depiction of distinct fighting styles gave its combatants a lifelike presence considered impossible to replicate with sprites. The Model 1 was exceedingly expensive and advanced, bringing arcade gaming technology further in front of home consoles; Sega's difficulties in porting Virtua Racing to the Genesis reflected this.

Sega also saw success in operating amusement arcades during this period. During the late 1980s and early 1990s, Sega's Japanese amusement operations division began opening progressively larger amusement centers targeted at a wider range of demographics, establishing its "En-Joint" concept in 1990. Over 150 venues were opened in the country during this period, with the prolific family-oriented Sega World chain and popular over-18s "GiGO" facilities in Roppongi and Ikebukuro among them. After creating new regional arcade divisions through buyouts of existing distributors like Deith Leisure, Sega took this successful formula and retooled it for overseas territories, beginning in 1992 with a number of small test locations in the United Kingdom, Taiwan, France, and Spain. Alongside a return to operations in the United States with the "Game City" arcade in Dallas, Texas, the four countries would receive a number of larger venues thereafter. In 1993, notable openings included the large Sega VirtuaLand in the Luxor Las Vegas, containing the high-end Virtua Formula, AS-1, and R360 simulators.

== Sega Saturn, falling console sales, and continued arcade success (1994–1999) ==
Development on Sega's next video game console, the Sega Saturn, started over two years before the system was showcased at the Tokyo Toy Show in June 1994. The name "Saturn" was the system's codename during development in Japan, but was chosen as the official product name. According to Kalinske, Sega of America "fought against the architecture of Saturn for quite some time". Seeking an alternative graphics chip for the Saturn, Kalinske attempted to broker a deal with Silicon Graphics, but Sega of Japan rejected the proposal. Silicon Graphics subsequently collaborated with Nintendo on the Nintendo 64. Kalinske, Sony Electronic Publishing's Olaf Olafsson, and Sony America's Micky Schulhof had discussed development of a joint "Sega/Sony hardware system", which never came to fruition due to Sega's desire to create hardware that could accommodate both 2D and 3D visuals and Sony's competing notion of focusing on 3D technology. Publicly, Kalinske defended the Saturn's design: "Our people feel that they need the multiprocessing to be able to bring to the home what we're doing next year in the arcades." In 1993, Sega restructured its internal studios in preparation for the Saturn's launch. To ensure high-quality 3D games would be available early in the Saturn's life, and to create a more energetic working environment, developers from Sega's arcade division were asked to create console games. New teams, such as Panzer Dragoon developer Team Andromeda, were formed during this time.

In mid-1994, MGM and Sega of America made a development deal for motion pictures, television shows and video games.

=== 32X ===
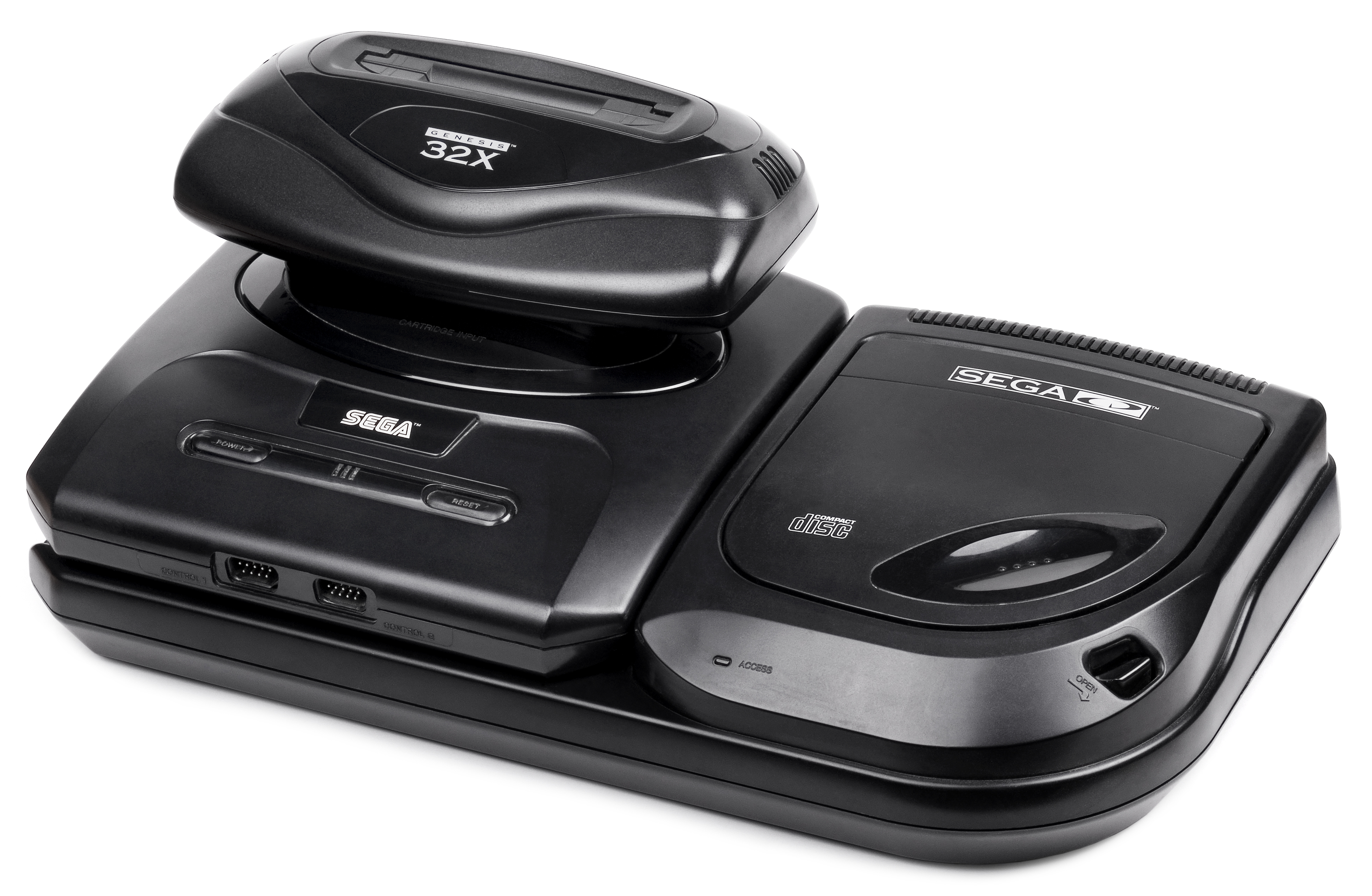
Sega Genesis with a 32X and Sega CD attached

In January 1994, Sega began to develop an add-on for the Genesis, the 32X, which would serve as a less expensive entry into the 32-bit era. The decision to create the add-on was made by Nakayama and widely supported by Sega of America employees. According to former Sega of America producer Scot Bayless, Nakayama was worried that the Saturn would not be available until after 1994 and that the recently released Atari Jaguar would reduce Sega's hardware sales. As a result, Nakayama ordered his engineers to have the system ready for launch by the end of the year. The 32X would not be compatible with the Saturn, but Sega executive Richard Brudvik-Lindner pointed out that the 32X would play Genesis games, and had the same system architecture as the Saturn. This was justified by Sega's statement that both platforms would run at the same time, and that the 32X would be aimed at players who could not afford the more expensive Saturn. Because both machines shared many of the same parts and were preparing to launch around the same time, tensions emerged between Sega of America and Sega of Japan when the Saturn was given priority. Sega released the 32X on November 21, 1994, in North America, December 3, 1994, in Japan, and January 1995 in PAL territories, and was sold at less than half of the Saturn's launch price. After the holiday season, however, interest in the 32X rapidly declined.

=== Saturn launch ===
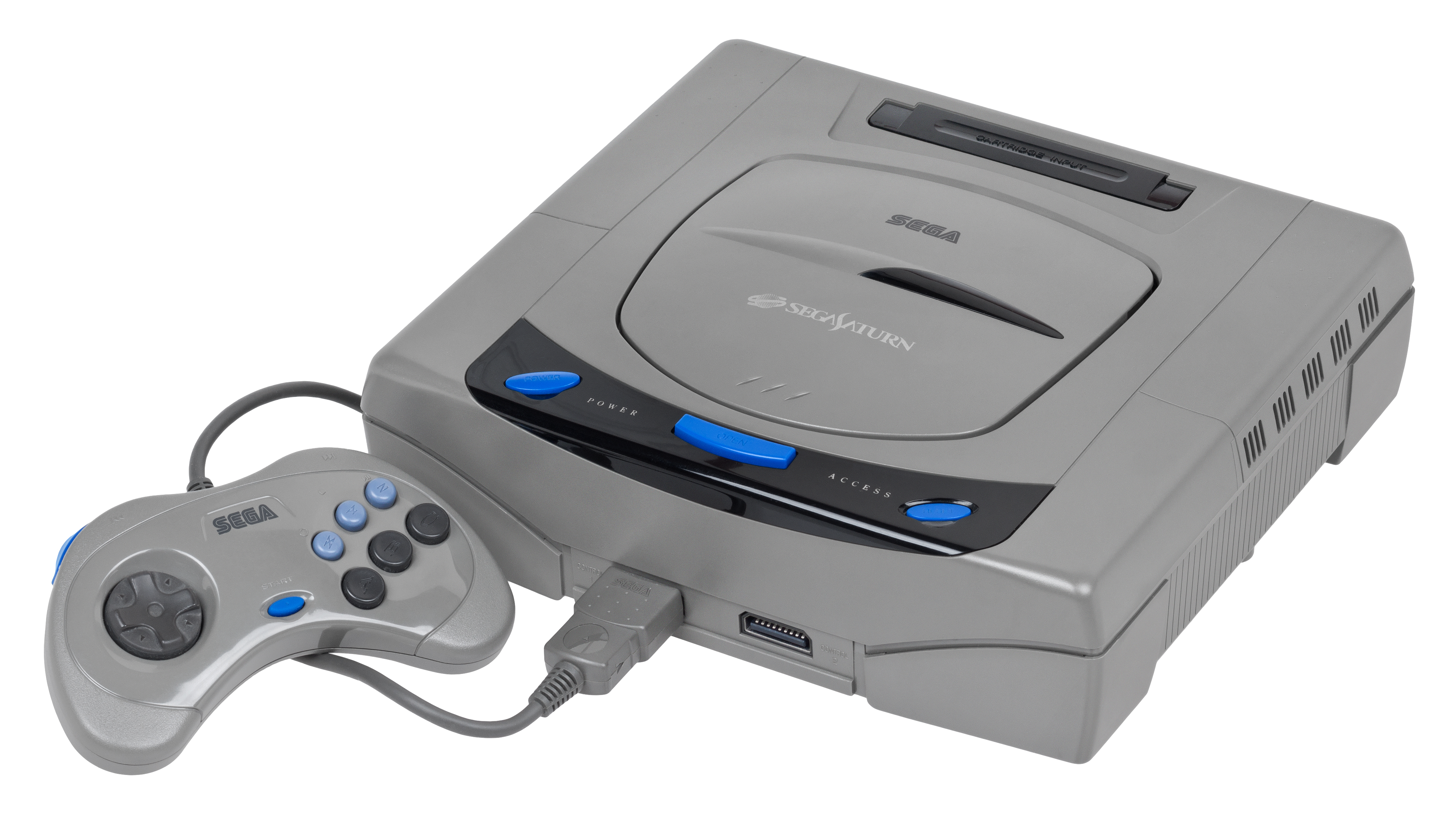
Japanese Sega Saturn, released in November 1994

Sega released the Saturn in Japan on November 22, 1994, at a price of ¥44,800. Virtua Fighter, a faithful port of the popular arcade game, sold at a nearly one-to-one ratio with the Saturn console at launch and was crucial to the system's early success in Japan. Fueled by the popularity of Virtua Fighter, Sega's initial shipment of 200,000 Saturn units sold out on the first day, and was more popular than the PlayStation in Japan. In March 1995, Sega of America CEO Tom Kalinske announced that the Saturn would be released in the U.S. on "Saturnday" (Saturday) September 2, 1995. However, Sega of Japan mandated an early launch to give the Saturn an advantage over the PlayStation. At the first Electronic Entertainment Expo (E3) in Los Angeles on May 11, 1995, Kalinske gave a keynote presentation in which he revealed the release price of US$399 (including a copy of Virtua Fighter), and described the features of the console. Kalinske also revealed that, due to "high consumer demand", Sega had already shipped 30,000 Saturns to Toys "R" Us, Babbage's, Electronics Boutique, and Software Etc. for immediate release. The announcement upset retailers who were not informed of the surprise release, including Best Buy and Walmart; KB Toys responded by dropping Sega from its lineup. The Saturn's release in Europe also came before the previously announced North American date, on July 8, 1995, at a price of £399.99. European retailers and press did not have time to promote the system or its games, harming sales. The Saturn's U.S. launch was accompanied by a reported $50 million advertising campaign that included coverage in publications such as Wired and Playboy. Early advertising for the system was targeted at a more mature, adult audience than the Sega Genesis ads. Because of the early launch, the Saturn had only six games (all published by Sega) available to start as most third-party games were slated to be released around the original launch date. Virtua Fighter's relative lack of popularity in the West, combined with a release schedule of only two games between the surprise launch and September 1995, prevented Sega from capitalizing on the Saturn's early timing.

Within two days of its September 9, 1995, launch in North America, the PlayStation sold more units than the Saturn had in the five months following its surprise launch, with almost all of the initial shipment of 100,000 units being sold in advance, and the rest selling out across the U.S. On October 2, 1995, Sega announced a Saturn price reduction to $299. Notwithstanding a subsequent increase in Saturn sales during the 1995 holiday season, new games were not enough to reverse the PlayStation's decisive lead. By 1996, the PlayStation had a considerably larger library than the Saturn, although Sega hoped to generate interest with upcoming exclusives such as Nights into Dreams. Within its first year, the PlayStation secured over 20% of the entire U.S. video game market. On the first day of the May 1996 E3 show, Sony announced a PlayStation price reduction to $199, a reaction to the release of the Model 2 Saturn in Japan at a price roughly equivalent to $199. On the second day, Sega announced it would match this price, though Saturn hardware was more expensive to manufacture.

In spite of the launch of the PlayStation and the Saturn, sales of 16-bit hardware/software continued to account for 64% of the video game market in 1995. Sega underestimated the continued popularity of the Genesis, and did not have the inventory to meet demand for the product. Sega was able to capture 43% of the dollar share of the U.S. video game market and sell more than 2 million Genesis units in 1995, but Kalinske estimated that "we could have sold another 300,000 Genesis systems in the November/December timeframe." Nakayama's decision to focus on the Saturn over the Genesis, based on the systems' relative performance in Japan, has been cited as the major contributing factor in this miscalculation. According to Sega Technical Institute head Roger Hector, after Sony's release of the PlayStation, the atmosphere at Sega became political, with "lots of finger-pointing".

=== Changes in management ===
Due to long-standing disagreements with Sega of Japan, Kalinske lost most of his interest in his work as CEO of Sega of America. On July 16, 1996, Sega announced that Shoichiro Irimajiri had been appointed chairman and CEO of Sega of America, while Kalinske would be leaving Sega after September 30 of that year. A former Honda executive, Irimajiri had been actively involved with Sega of America since joining Sega in 1993. Sega also announced that David Rosen and Nakayama had resigned from their positions as chairman and co-chairman of Sega of America, though both men remained with the company. Bernie Stolar, a former executive at Sony Computer Entertainment of America, was named Sega of America's executive vice president in charge of product development and third-party relations. Stolar, who had arranged a six-month PlayStation exclusivity deal for Mortal Kombat 3 and helped build close relations with Electronic Arts while at Sony, was perceived as a major asset by Sega officials. Finally, Sega of America made plans to expand its PC software business.

Stolar was not supportive of the Saturn due to his belief that the hardware was poorly designed, and publicly announced at E3 1997 that "The Saturn is not our future." While Stolar had "no interest in lying to people" about the Saturn's prospects, he continued to emphasize quality games for the system, and subsequently reflected that "we tried to wind it down as cleanly as we could for the consumer." At Sony, Stolar opposed the localization of certain Japanese PlayStation games that he felt would not represent the system well in North America, and advocated a similar policy for the Saturn during his time at Sega, although he later sought to distance himself from this perception. These changes were accompanied by a softer image that Sega was beginning to portray in its advertising, including removing the "Sega!" scream and holding press events for the education industry.

=== Continued arcade success ===
While Sega struggled greatly with its consumer division during the Saturn years, its arcade divisions remained profitable, with annual arcade revenues increasing year-on-year throughout the late 1990s. This was despite a market slump in the late 1990s, caused by the increased popularity of home video game consoles.

Sega had partnered with GE to develop the Sega Model 2 arcade system board, building on 3D technology in the arcade industry at the time. The board ran numerous successful arcade games, including Daytona USA, Virtua Cop, and Virtua Fighter 2. The Model 2 was equipped with better hardware than any home video game consoles at the time, and was licensed to other developers. There was also a technological arms race between Sega and Namco during this period, driving the growth of 3D gaming. By 1996, Virtua Fighter for the Model 1 had sold over 40,000 arcade units and the Model 2 had sold over 130,000 systems. Virtua Fighter and Virtua Fighter 2 became Sega's best-selling arcade games of all time, surpassing their previous record holder Out Run. In 1996, Sega partnered with Lockheed Martin to develop the Sega Model 3, which when released was the most powerful arcade system in existence. By 2000, Sega had sold more than 200,000 Model 2 and 3 systems.

In 1995, Sega partnered with Atlus to launch Print Club (Purikura), an arcade photo sticker machine that produces selfie photos. Atlus and Sega introduced Purikura in February 1995, initially at game arcades, before expanding to other popular culture locations such as fast food shops, train stations, karaoke establishments and bowling alleys. Purikura became a popular form of entertainment among youths across East Asia, laying the foundations for modern selfie culture. By 1997, about 47,000 Purikura machines had been sold, earning Sega an estimated ¥25 billion (£173 million) or $283,000,000 (equivalent to $568,000,000 in 2025) annually from Purikura sales that year. Various other similar purikira machines appeared from other manufacturers, with Sega controlling about half of the market in 1997. Despite the arcade market stagnating towards the end of the decade, Sega's arcade revenues increased as a result of the Sega Model 2 and 3 arcade systems, the Print Club machines, and Sega's Japanese arcade centers. Print Club alone generated over $1 billion in sales for Atlus and Sega.

=== Failed merger with Bandai ===
In January 1997, Sega announced its intentions to merge with Bandai, a Japanese toy maker that was Japan's largest and the world's third largest at the time. The merger, planned as a $1 billion stock swap whereby Sega would wholly acquire Bandai, was set to form a planned company known as Sega Bandai, Ltd. Plans for the merger were necessitated by the struggling financial state of both Sega and Bandai, with Bandai announcing their anticipated loss for the fiscal year and Sega announcing a lower than expected profit. Sega Bandai was planned to be an entertainment conglomerate, with an estimated $6 billion in revenue. Some financial analysts expressed doubt about this strategy; according to SBC Warburg Securities analyst Reinier Dobbelmann, "both companies have big ideas, but they don't carry them out."

Initially planned to be finalized in October of that year, the merger was called off in May 1997. Opposition to the merger had grown in the ranks of Bandai's midlevel executives, with reasons cited including cultural differences with Sega's corporate culture colliding with Bandai's family-run business. This opposition had become so great that Bandai's board of directors called a meeting to discuss the situation and decided to cancel the merger, although they did agree to a business alliance with Sega. The following day, Bandai president Makoto Yamashina resigned his position, taking responsibility for the failed merger and apologizing publicly for his inability to get the merger completed. In a separate press conference, Nakayama elaborated on his reason for agreeing to cancel the acquisition of Bandai, stating, "We will not be successful working together if Bandai's management cannot take hold of people's hearts."

As a result of the company's deteriorating financial situation, Nakayama resigned as president of Sega in January 1998 in favor of Irimajiri. It has been speculated that Nakayama's resignation was in part due to the failure of the Sega Bandai merger, as well as Sega's 1997 performance. Stolar would subsequently accede to become CEO and president of Sega of America.

=== Struggles in other divisions ===
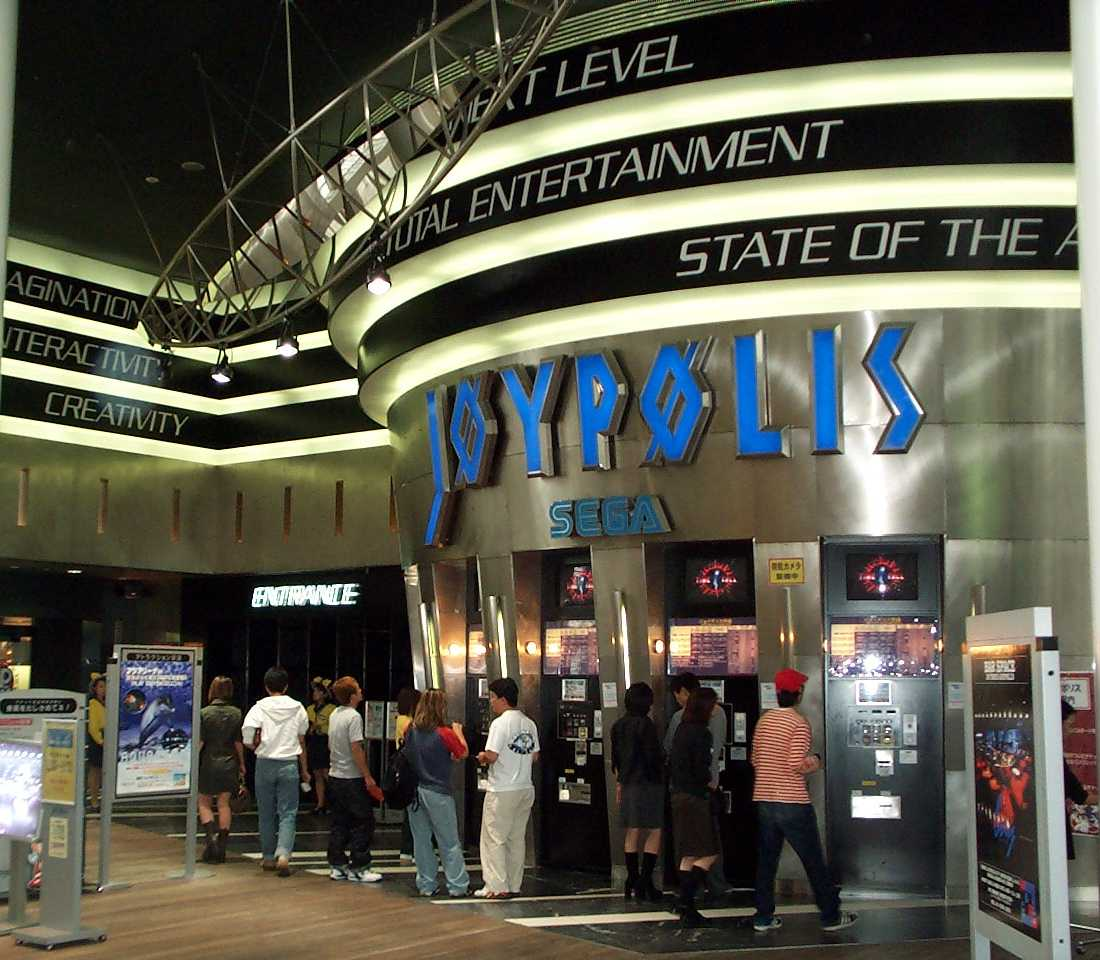
Entrance to Tokyo Joypolis, the flagship Sega indoor theme park, in 1999

Aside from the Saturn, Sega made forays in the consumer PC market with the 1995 establishment of SegaSoft, which was tasked with creating original Saturn and PC games. The mid-1990s also saw Sega making efforts to expand beyond its image as a strictly kids-oriented, family entertainment company, by publishing a number of games with extreme violence and sexual themes, and introducing the "Deep Water" label to mark games with mature content. From 1994 to 1999, Sega participated in the pinball market when it took over Data East's pinball division. In December 1997, Sega and CSK jointly purchased an ¥11 million stake in ASCII Corporation, a Japanese company best known for co-creating the MSX computer.

Beginning in 1994, Sega launched numerous indoor theme parks in Japan, including several Joypolis parks in locations like Yokohama and Odaiba, under a concept officially dubbed "Amusement Theme Park". Populating them were a number of interactive "mid-size" attractions that had been developed in-house, such as the VR-1 virtual reality motion simulator made in conjunction with Virtuality Group. Sega intended to create 100 "ATP" venues across the world by the start of the 2000s, however the only overseas locations to materialise were SegaWorld London in September 1996 and Sega World Sydney in March 1997. In March 1997, Sega also launched its GameWorks urban entertainment centers in the US in a joint venture with Universal Studios and DreamWorks SKG. Some of these flagship venues exceeded projected numbers in their first years, however others, including the SegaWorld in London, faced managerial problems and poor reviews.

=== Financial decline ===
The Saturn failed to take the lead in the market as its predecessor had. After the launch of the Nintendo 64 in 1996, sales of the Saturn and its games were sharply reduced, while the PlayStation outsold the Saturn by three-to-one in the U.S. in 1997. As of August 1997, Sony controlled 47% of the console market, Nintendo 40%, and Sega only 12%. Neither price cuts nor high-profile game releases proved helpful. After several years of declining profits, Sega had a slight increase in the fiscal year ended March 1997, partly driven by increasing arcade revenue, while outperforming Nintendo during the mid-term period. However, in the fiscal year ending March 1998, Sega suffered its first financial loss since its 1988 listing on the Tokyo Stock Exchange. Due to a 54.8% decline in consumer product sales (including a 75.4% decline overseas), the company reported a net loss of ¥43.3 billion (US$327.8 million) and a consolidated net loss of ¥35.6 billion (US$269.8 million). Shortly before announcing its financial losses, Sega announced that it was discontinuing the Saturn in North America to prepare for the launch of its successor. The Saturn would last longer in Japan and Europe. The decision to abandon the Saturn effectively left the Western market without Sega games for over one year. Sega suffered an additional ¥42.881 billion consolidated net loss in the fiscal year ending March 1999, and announced plans to eliminate 1,000 jobs, nearly a quarter of its workforce. With lifetime sales of 9.26 million units, the Saturn is considered a commercial failure, although its install base in Japan surpassed the Nintendo 64's 5.54 million. Lack of distribution has been cited as a significant factor contributing to the Saturn's failure, as the system's surprise launch damaged Sega's reputation with key retailers. Conversely, Nintendo's long delay in releasing a 3D console and damage caused to Sega's reputation by poorly supported add-ons for the Genesis are considered major factors allowing Sony to gain a foothold in the market.

In contrast to Sega's declining home consumer video game revenues, Sega's arcade revenues were increasing year-on-year during the late 1990s. Despite the arcade market stagnating towards the end of the decade, Sega's arcade revenues increased as a result of the Sega Model 2 and 3 arcade systems, the Atlus-developed Print Club (Purikura) photo sticker machines, and Sega's Japanese arcade centers. But it was not enough to offset the significant decline in consumer product sales, leading to overall declines in total revenues and profits. In the fiscal year ended March 1997, Sega had a slight increase in total revenue and profit, as a result of its growing arcade revenue. However, Sega later had its first financial loss in the fiscal year ended March 1998, as the result of a significant drop in consumer product sales.

Sega financial results (April 1992 to March 1998)
Fiscal year	Annual net sales (revenue)			Annual net income (profit)
Fiscal year	Arcade	Consumer	Total	Annual net income (profit)
April 1992 to March 1993	¥116.472 billion	¥230.465 billion	¥346.937 billion ($3.12 billion)	¥28.017 billion
April 1993 to March 1994	¥113.878 billion	¥240.154 billion	¥354.032 billion ($3.46 billion)	¥23.223 billion
April 1994 to March 1995	¥135.604 billion	¥197.719 billion	¥333.323 billion ($3.54 billion)	¥14.085 billion
April 1995 to March 1996	¥167.112 billion	¥179.07 billion	¥346.182 billion ($3.18 billion)	¥5.304 billion
April 1996 to March 1997	¥186.432 billion	¥173.498 billion	¥359.93 billion ($3.31 billion)	¥5.572 billion
April 1997 to March 1998	¥192.848 billion	¥78.627 billion	¥271.475 billion ($2.06 billion)	– ¥43.3 billion (loss)

== Dreamcast and continuing struggles (1999–2001) ==
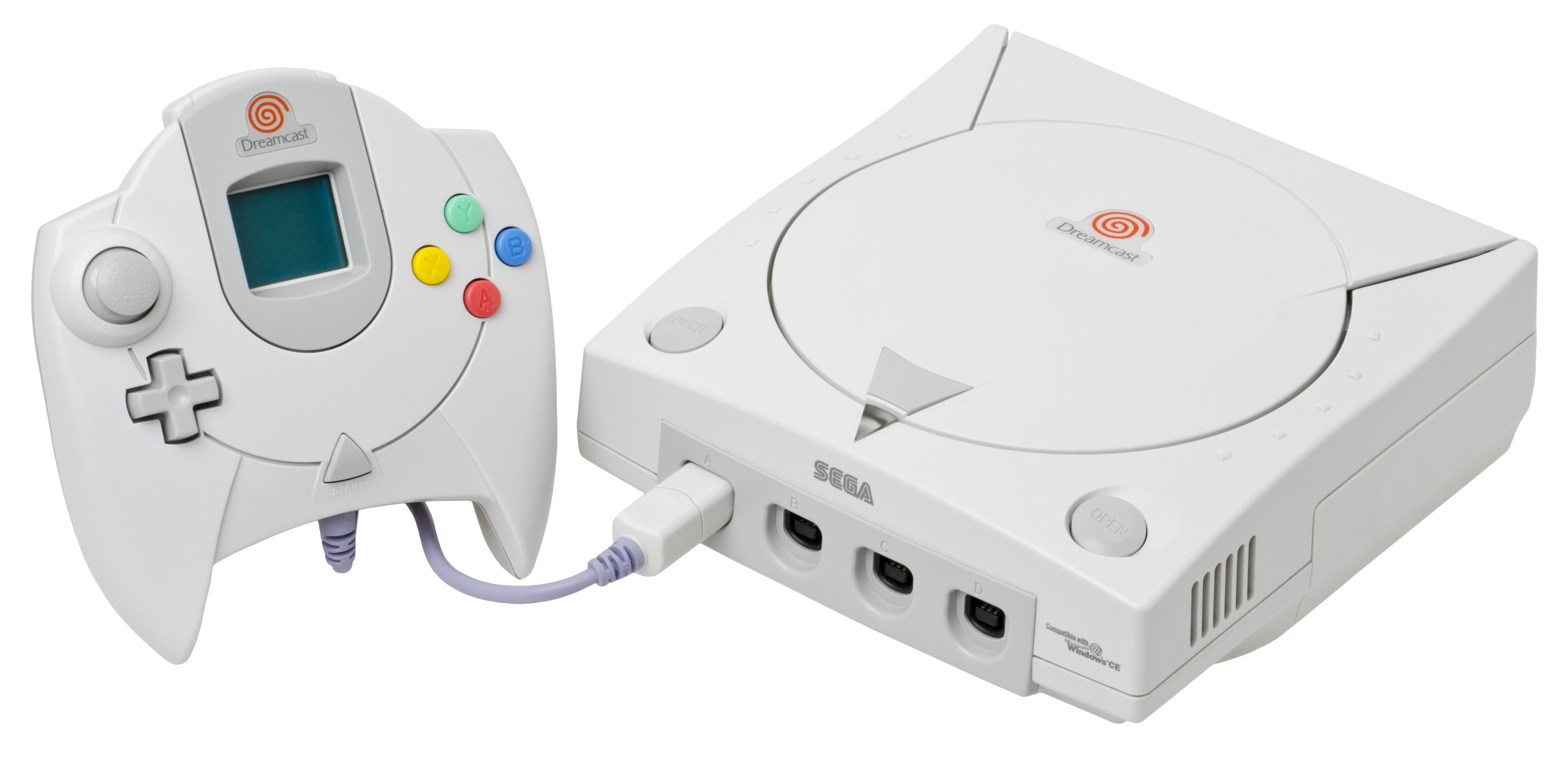
Sega's Dreamcast was the company's last video game console.

Despite taking massive losses on the Saturn, including a 75 percent drop in half-year profits just before the Japanese launch of the Dreamcast, Sega felt confident about its new system. The Dreamcast attracted significant interest and drew many pre-orders. Sega announced that Sonic Adventure, the next game starring company mascot Sonic the Hedgehog, would arrive in time for the Dreamcast's launch and promoted the game with a large-scale public demonstration at the Tokyo Kokusai Forum Hall. However, Sega could not achieve its shipping goals for the Dreamcast's Japanese launch due to a shortage of PowerVR chipsets caused by a high failure rate in the manufacturing process. As more than half of its limited stock had been pre-ordered, Sega stopped pre-orders in Japan. On November 27, 1998, the Dreamcast launched in Japan at a price of JP¥29,000, and the entire stock sold out by the end of the day. However, of the four games available at launch, only one—a port of Virtua Fighter 3, the most successful arcade game Sega ever released in Japan—sold well. Sega estimated that an additional 200,000–300,000 Dreamcast units could have been sold with sufficient supply. Irimajiri hoped to sell over 1 million Dreamcast units in Japan by February 1999, but less than 900,000 were sold, undermining Sega's attempts to build up a sufficient installed base to ensure the Dreamcast's survival after the arrival of competition from other manufacturers. Prior to the Western launch, Sega reduced the price of the Dreamcast to JP¥19,900, effectively making the hardware unprofitable but increasing sales.

In America, Sega of America's senior vice president of marketing Peter Moore, a fan of the attitude previously associated with Sega's brand, worked with Foote, Cone & Belding and Access Communications to develop the "It's Thinking" campaign of 15-second television commercials, which emphasized the Dreamcast's hardware power. According to Moore, "We needed to create something that would really intrigue consumers, somewhat apologize for the past, but invoke [sic] all the things we loved about Sega, primarily from the Genesis days." On August 11, Sega of America confirmed that Stolar had been fired, leaving Moore to direct the launch. Prior to the Dreamcast's release, Sega was dealt a blow when EA—the largest third-party video game publisher—announced it would not develop games for the system. EA executive Bing Gordon claimed "[Sega] couldn't afford to give us [EA] the same kind of license that EA has had over the last five years", but Stolar recounted that EA president Larry Probst wanted "exclusive rights to be the only sports brand on Dreamcast", which Stolar could not accept due to Sega's recent $10 million purchase of sports game developer Visual Concepts. While the Dreamcast would have none of EA's popular sports games, "Sega Sports" games developed mainly by Visual Concepts helped to fill that void.

=== Western launch ===
The Dreamcast launched in North America on September 9, 1999, at a price of $199—which Sega's marketing dubbed "9/9/99 for $199". Eighteen launch games were available for the Dreamcast in the U.S. Sega set a new sales record by selling more than 225,132 Dreamcast units in 24 hours, earning the company $98.4 million in what Moore called "the biggest 24 hours in entertainment retail history". Within two weeks, U.S. Dreamcast sales exceeded 500,000. By Christmas, Sega held 31 percent of the North American video game marketshare. On November 4, Sega announced it had sold over one million Dreamcast units. Nevertheless, the launch was marred by a glitch at one of Sega's manufacturing plants, which produced defective GD-ROMs. Sega released the Dreamcast in Europe on October 14, 1999, at a price of GB£200. While Sega sold 500,000 units in Europe by Christmas 1999, sales did not continue at this pace, and by October 2000, Sega had sold only about 1 million units in Europe.

Though the Dreamcast launch had been successful, Sony still held 60 percent of the overall video game market share in North America with the PlayStation at the end of 1999. On March 2, 1999, in what one report called a "highly publicized, vaporware-like announcement" Sony revealed the first details of its "next generation PlayStation", which Ken Kutaragi claimed would allow video games to convey unprecedented emotions. The same year, Nintendo announced that its next generation console would meet or exceed anything on the market, and Microsoft began development of its own console.

=== Development studio restructure ===
In what has been called "a brief moment of remarkable creativity", in 2000, Sega restructured its arcade and console development teams into nine semi-autonomous studios headed by the company's top designers. Studios included United Game Artists, Hitmaker, Smilebit, Overworks, Sega AM2, Sonic Team, WOW Entertainment, Amusement Vision, and Sega Rosso. Sega's design houses were encouraged to experiment and benefited from a relatively lax approval process. This resulted in games such as Rez,The Typing of the Dead, Seaman, and Segagaga. Sega also revived franchises from the Genesis era, such as Ecco the Dolphin. AM2 developed what Sega hoped would be the Dreamcast's killer app, Shenmue, a "revenge epic in the tradition of Chinese cinema." Incorporating a simulated day/night cycle with variable weather, non-player characters with regular schedules, and the ability to pick up and examine detailed objects (also introducing the Quick-time event in its modern form), Shenmue went over budget and was rumored to have cost Sega over $50 million. As the first fully 3D platforming game starring Sega's mascot, Sonic the Hedgehog, Sonic Team's Sonic Adventure was considered "the centerpiece of the [Dreamcast] launch". Adventure garnered criticism for technical problems including erratic camera angles and glitches, but was praised for its "luscious" visuals, "vast, twisting environments" and iconic set pieces. It has been described as the Sonic series' creative apex. However, it failed "to catch on with players in nearly the way that [Nintendo's] Mario 64 had done", perhaps due to a perceived lack of gameplay depth. In sports, Visual Concepts' NFL 2K football series and its NBA 2K basketball series were critically acclaimed. Additionally, with the release of Sega's NAOMI arcade system board, the focus of the arcade divisions shifted to produce games that could easily be ported to the Dreamcast.

=== Continued financial losses ===
Sega's initial momentum proved fleeting as U.S. Dreamcast sales—which exceeded 1.5 million by the end of 1999—began to decline as early as January 2000. Poor Japanese sales contributed to Sega's ¥42.88 billion ($404 million) consolidated net loss in the fiscal year ending March 2000, which followed a similar loss of ¥42.881 billion the previous year and marked Sega's third consecutive annual loss. Although Sega's overall sales for the term increased 27.4%, and Dreamcast sales in North America and Europe greatly exceeded the company's expectations, this increase in sales coincided with a decrease in profitability due to the investments required to launch the Dreamcast in Western markets and poor software sales in Japan.

At the same time, increasingly poor market conditions reduced the profitability of Sega's Japanese arcade business, prompting the company to close 246 of its 870 locations. Arcade sales in 2000 dropped 16% in Japan, and 15% overseas, despite downsizing by competitors. In the face of a worldwide decline in the arcade industry, Sega cut down the majority of its overseas operations, closing the flagship Sega World indoor theme parks in London and Sydney. In Japan, novel new venues, including Club Segas in Shibuya and Yokohama, as well as the popular Derby Owners Club, kept Sega's arcade business afloat, however with the exception of the successful Samba De Amigo, no arcade rhythm game releases by the company capitalised on the genre's first boom in popularity.

Moore became the president and chief operating officer of Sega of America on 8 May 2000. He said that the Dreamcast would need to sell 5 million units in the U.S. by the end of 2000 to remain a viable platform, but Sega ultimately fell short of this goal with some 3 million units sold. Moreover, Sega's attempts to spur increased Dreamcast sales through lower prices and cash rebates caused escalating financial losses. Instead of an expected profit, for the six months ending September 2000, Sega posted a ¥17.98 billion ($163.11 million) loss, with the company projecting a year-end loss of ¥23.6 billion. This estimate was more than doubled to ¥58.3 billion, and in March 2001, Sega posted a consolidated net loss of ¥51.7 billion ($417.5 million).

Although the PS2's October 26 U.S. launch was marred by shortages, many disappointed consumers continued to wait for a PS2—while the PSone, a remodelled PlayStation, was the best-selling console in the U.S. at the start of the 2000 holiday season. According to Moore, "the PlayStation 2 effect that we were relying upon did not work for us ... people will hang on for as long as possible ... What effectively happened is the PlayStation 2 lack of availability froze the marketplace". Eventually, Sony and Nintendo held 50 and 35 percent of the US video game market, respectively, while Sega held only 15 percent. According to former Sega of America vice president of communications Charles Bellfield, Dreamcast software sold at an 8-to-1 ratio with the hardware, but this ratio "on a small install base didn't give us the revenue ... to keep this platform viable in the medium to long term."

== Shift to third-party software development (2001–2003) ==
Sega's financial trouble in the 1998–2002 period

In 2000, Sega and CSK Corporation chairman Isao Okawa replaced Irimajiri as president of Sega. Irimajiri had been replaced as a result of Sega's financial losses. Okawa had long advocated that Sega abandon the console business. His sentiments were not unique; Sega co-founder David Rosen had "always felt it was a bit of a folly for them to be limiting their potential to Sega hardware", and Stolar had previously suggested that Sega should have sold their company to Microsoft. In September 2000, in a meeting with Sega's Japanese executives and the heads of the company's major Japanese game development studios, Moore and Bellfield recommended that Sega abandon its console business and focus on software—prompting the studio heads to walk out. On November 1, 2000, Sega changed its company name from Sega Enterprises to Sega Corporation. In December 2000, The New York Times reported that Nintendo and Sega were holding discussions regarding a potential US$2 billion buyout, though the two companies denied this; a Sega spokesman called the report "absolutely outrageous". Okawa talked to Microsoft about a sale or merger with their Xbox division, but those talks failed. Forbes has speculated that the Nintendo buyout discussions could have been to put pressure on Microsoft to acquire Sega.

On January 23, 2001, a story ran in Nihon Keizai Shimbun claiming that Sega would cease production of the Dreamcast and develop software for other platforms. After initial denial, Sega of Japan put out a press release confirming they were considering producing software for the PlayStation 2 and Game Boy Advance as part of their "new management policy". On January 31, 2001, Sega announced the discontinuation of the Dreamcast after March 31 and the restructuring of the company as a "platform-agnostic" third-party developer. Sega also announced a Dreamcast price reduction to $99 to eliminate its unsold inventory, which was estimated at 930,000 units as of April 2001. After a further reduction to $79, the Dreamcast was cleared out of stores at $49.95. The final Dreamcast unit manufactured was autographed by the heads of all nine of Sega's internal game development studios as well as the heads of Visual Concepts and Wave Master and given away with 55 first-party Dreamcast games through a competition organized by GamePro magazine. Okawa, who had previously loaned Sega $500 million in the summer of 1999, died on March 16, 2001; shortly before his death, he forgave Sega's debts to him and returned his $695 million worth of Sega and CSK stock, helping the company survive the third-party transition. As part of this restructuring, nearly one-third of Sega's Tokyo workforce was laid off in 2001. By March 31, 2002, Sega had five consecutive fiscal years of net losses. A business alliance with Microsoft was announced where Sega would develop 11 games for the new Xbox console.

After Okawa's death, Hideki Sato became president of Sega. Sato, a 30-year veteran of Sega, had previously developed Sega's video game consoles. Because of poor sales in 2002, Sega was forced to cut its profit forecast by 90% for 2003. As a result, Sega began to look at opportunities for a merger to fix its financial situation. In 2003, Sega began talks with Sammy Corporation and Namco. Sato stated that he would select the partner that fit the business best. Sega made an announcement on February 13, 2003, of its decision to merge with Sammy. However, as late as April 17 of the same year, Sega was still in talks with Namco, which was attempting to overturn the merger and went public with its offer to be acquired. Sega's consideration of Namco's offer upset executives of Sammy. However, the day after Sega announced it was no longer planning to merge with Sammy, Namco withdrew its offer. Though Namco expressed that it would be willing to work with Sega on a future deal, Sega expressed it was not interested. Due to the failure to complete a merger, Sato was forced to step down. In 2003, he and COO Tetsu Kamaya announced they were stepping down from their roles, with Sato being replaced by Hisao Oguchi, the head of Hitmaker. As part of Oguchi's restructuring plan, he announced his intention to consolidate Sega's studios into "four or five core operations." Sega's studios were consolidated and reintegrated into Sega as its R&D division, no longer existing as independent companies. Peter Moore left Sega of America in January 2003. The reason for leaving was a frustrating meeting with Sega of Japan refusing to adapt to the changing gaming landscape due to mature games like Grand Theft Auto III. Hideaki Irie became the new president and COO of Sega of America in October 2003. Irie previously worked at Agetec and ASCII.

== Sammy takeover and business expansion (2003–2015) ==
Although talks of a merger had soured earlier, Sega and Sammy were able to resume discussions. In August 2003, Sammy bought the outstanding 22% of shares that CSK had, becoming Sega's largest shareholder in the process. In the same year, Hajime Satomi, primary owner and president and CEO of Sammy, stated that Sega's activity will focus on their profitable arcade business as opposed to their loss-incurring home software development sector. Satomi was determined to push this strategy, stating, "if [Sammy's] vision does not agree with that of Sega then we might have to consider taking more shares." Satomi had a history with Sega, as he was mentored by Isao Okawa and was previously asked to be CEO of Sega.

After the decline of the global arcade industry around the 21st century, Sega introduced several novel concepts tailored to the Japanese market. Derby Owners Club was an arcade machine with memory cards for data storage, designed to take over half an hour to complete and costing JP¥500 to play. Testing of Derby Owners Club in an arcade in Chicago showed that it became the most popular machine in the arcade, with a 92% replay rate. While the eight-player Japanese version of the game was released in 1999, due to size issues, the game was reduced to a smaller four player version and released in North America in 2003. Trading card game machines were introduced, with games such as World Club Champion Football for general audiences and Mushiking: The King of Beetles for young children. Sega also introduced internet functionality in arcades with Virtua Fighter 4 in 2001, and further enhanced it with ALL.Net, introduced in 2004.

In 2003, Sega had plans of partnering with John Woo on development of video games by his Tiger Hill Entertainment studio, but plans fell through.

During mid-2004, Sammy bought a controlling share in Sega Corporation at a cost of $1.1 billion, creating the new company Sega Sammy Holdings, an entertainment conglomerate. Since then, Sega and Sammy became subsidiaries of the aforementioned holding company, with both companies operating independently, while the executive departments merged. According to Satomi, Sega had been operating at a loss for nearly 10 years and lacked a clear financial base. Sammy feared stagnation and overreliance of its highly profitable pachislot and pachinko machine business, and wanted to divesify its business in new fields using Sega's broader range of involvement in different entertainment fields. Sega Sammy Holdings was structured into four parts, three of which were Sega: Consumer Business (video games), Amusement Machine Business (arcade games), Amusement Center Business (Sega's theme parks and arcades) and Pachislot and Pachinko Business (Sammy's pachinko and pachislot business). Satomi did state that not all Sega executives were in favor of the takeover. While it is unclear for his reasons, head of Wow Entertainment (previously Sega AM1) Rikiya Nakagawa resigned a week after the merger. Sega would also restructure the development studios again, consolidating the divisions further into the Global Entertainment, Amusement Software, and New Entertainment R&D divisions.

To drive growth in western markets, Sega announced new leadership for Sega of America and Sega Europe in 2005. Simon Jeffery became president and COO of Sega of America, and Mike Hayes president and COO for Sega Europe. In 2009, Mike Hayes became president of the combined outfit of Sega West which includes both Sega of America and Sega Europe, due to Simon Jeffery leaving. Mike Hayes is credited for re-inventing Sega's software strategy, taking it from failing to $500 million in revenue, focusing on PC with franchises like Total War and Football Manager, selling Mario & Sonic at the Olympic Games and at one point being one of the top 3 customers on Steam.

=== Development studio dealings and new intellectual properties ===
In 2005, Sega sold Visual Concepts to Take-Two Interactive, and purchased UK-based developer Creative Assembly, known for its Total War series. In the same year, Sega Racing Studio was also formed by former Codemasters employees. In 2006, Sega Europe purchased Sports Interactive, known for its Football Manager series. Sega of America purchased Secret Level in 2006, which was renamed to Sega Studios San Francisco in 2008. In early 2008, Sega announced that they would re-establish an Australian presence, as a subsidiary of Sega of Europe, with a development studio branded as Sega Studios Australia. In the same year, Sega launched a subscription based flash website called "PlaySEGA" which played emulated versions of Sega Genesis as well original web-based flash games. It was subsequently shut down due to low subscription numbers. In 2013, following THQ's bankruptcy, Sega bought Relic Entertainment, known for its Company of Heroes series. In 2008, Sega announced the closure of Sega Racing Studio, although the studio was later acquired by Codemasters. Closures of Sega Studios San Francisco and Sega Studios Australia followed in 2010 and 2013, respectively.

In 2007, Sega and Nintendo collaborated using Sega's acquired Olympic Games license to create the Mario and Sonic at the Olympic Games series, which has sold over 20 million in total. In the console and handheld business, Sega found success in Japan with the Yakuza and Hatsune Miku: Project DIVA series of games, amongst others primarily aimed at the Japanese market. In Japan, Sega distributes games from smaller Japanese game developers and localizations of Western games. 2009 also saw Sega's introduction of the Sega Vision, a portable media player and the company's first consumer hardware since the cancellation of the Dreamcast in 2001, released as a prize in Sega's UFO Catcher machines. For amusement arcades, Sega's most successful games continued to be based on network and card systems. Games of this type include Sangokushi Taisen and Border Break. Arcade machine sales incurred higher profits than their console, portable, and PC games on a year-to-year basis until 2010s.

In 2004, the GameWorks chain of arcades became owned by Sega, until the chain was sold off in 2011. Sega Republic, an indoor theme park in Dubai, opened to the public in 2009, while the following year, Sega began providing the 3D imaging for Hatsune Miku's holographic concerts. In 2013, in co-operation with BBC Earth, Sega opened the first interactive nature simulation museum, Orbi Yokohama in Yokohama, Japan. Also in 2013, Index Corporation was purchased by Sega Sammy after going bankrupt. After the buyout, Sega implemented a corporate spin-off with Index, and re-branded the video game assets of the company as Atlus, a wholly owned subsidiary of Sega.

=== Changes to business structure ===
Due to the decline of packaged game sales both domestically and outside Japan in the 2010s, Sega began layoffs and reduction of their Western businesses, such as Sega shutting down five offices based in Europe and Australia on July 1, 2012. This was done to focus on the digital game market, such as PC and mobile devices. Strong performers for Sega on these platforms include Phantasy Star Online 2 and Chain Chronicle. Mike Hayes left Sega Europe in 2012 and was replaced by Jurgen Post. John Cheng also began serving as president and COO of Sega of America in 2012. The amount of SKU gradually shrunk from 84 in 2005 to 32 in 2014. Because of the shrinking arcade business in Japan, development personnel would also be relocated to the digital game area. Sega gradually reduced its arcade centers from 450 facilities in 2005, to around 200 in 2015. In the mobile market, Sega released its first app on the iTunes Store with a version of Super Monkey Ball in 2008. Since then, the strategies for Asian and Western markets have become independent. The Western line-up consisted of emulations of games and pay-to-play apps, which were eventually overshadowed by more social and free-to-play games, eventually leading to 19 of the older mobile games being pulled due to quality concerns in May 2015. Beginning in 2012, Sega also began acquiring studios for mobile development, with studios such as Hardlight, Three Rings Design, and Demiurge Studios becoming fully owned subsidiaries.

In the 2010s, Sega established operational firms for each of their businesses, to streamline operations. In 2012, Sega established Sega Networks for its mobile games; and although separate at first, it merged with Sega Corporation in 2015. Sega Games was structured as a "Consumer Online Company", while Sega Networks focused on developing games for mobile devices. GameWorks was sold in 2011. In 2012, Sega Entertainment was established for Sega's amusement facility business, and in 2015, Sega Interactive was established for the arcade game business. In January 2015, Sega of America announced their relocation from San Francisco to Atlus USA's headquarters in Irvine, California, which was completed later that year.

Over the course of the existence of Sega Sammy Holdings to 2015, Sega's operating income generally saw improvements compared to Sega's past financial difficulties, but was not profitable every year of operation.

Sega operating income 2005–2015, Japanese yen in millions
Business year	2005	2006	2007	2008	2009	2010	2011	2012	2013	2014	2015
Amusement Machine Sales	7,423	12,176	11,682	7,152	6,890	7,094	7,317	7,415	1,902	−1,264	−2,356
Amusement Center Operations	5,472	9,244	132	−9,807	−7,520	−1,338	342	355	1,194	60	−946
Consumer Business	−8,809	9,244	1,748	−5,989	−941	6,332	1,969	−15,182	−732	2,089	4033

== Sega Group and Sega Interactive (2015–present) ==
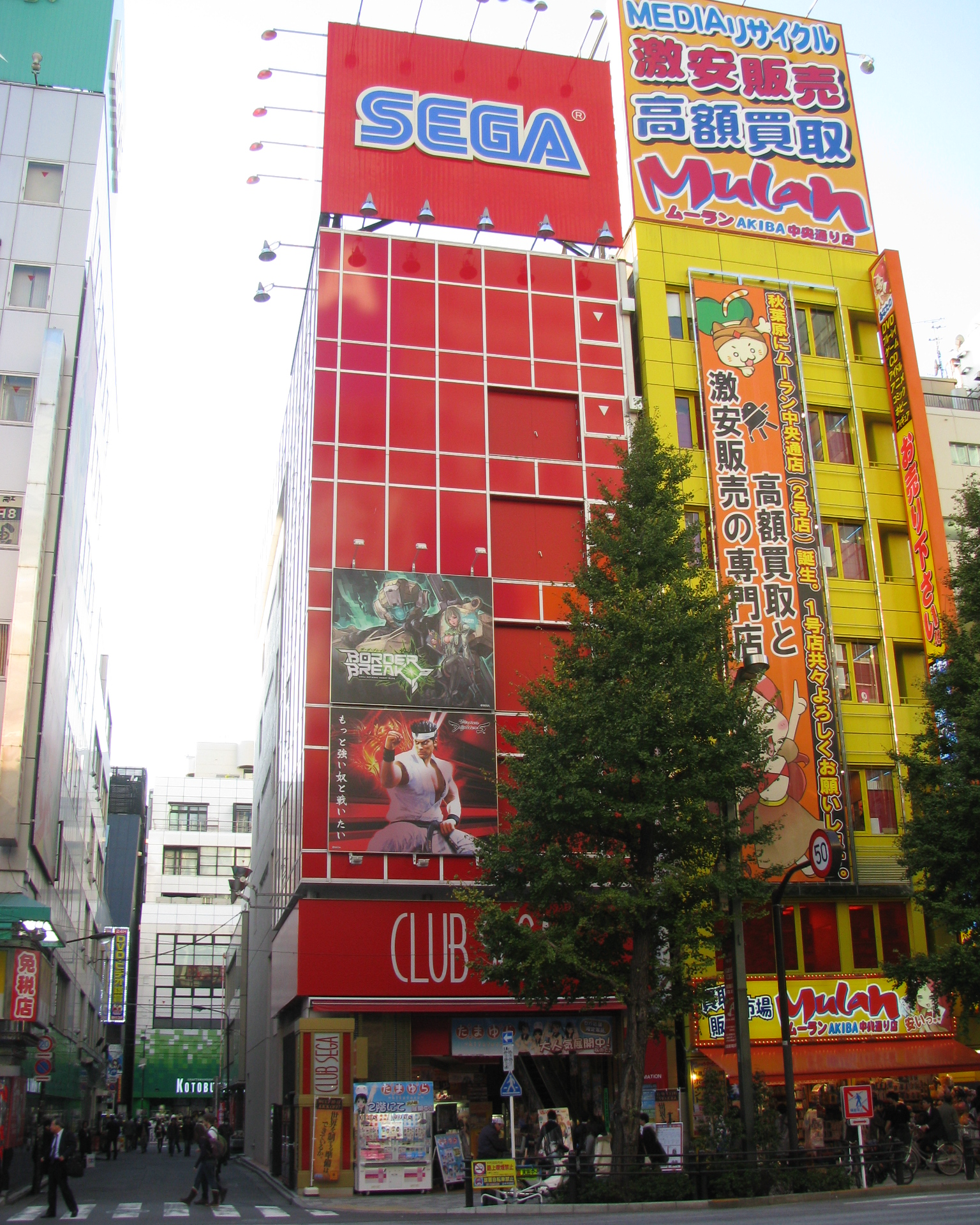
Club Sega game center in Akihabara, Tokyo

In April 2015, Sega Corporation was reorganized into Sega Group, one of three groups of Sega Sammy Holdings. Sega Holdings Co., Ltd. was established, with four business sectors under its organization. Haruki Satomi, son of Hajime Satomi, took office as president and CEO of the company in April 2015.

Sega announced at the Tokyo Game Show in September 2016 that they acquired the intellectual property and development rights to the games developed and published by Technosoft. Factors that influenced the acquisition included the former Technosoft president stating that they did not want the Technosoft brand to desist, and so handing over the intellectual properties to Sega was the only other option. Sega and Technosoft also had an established collaboration during the Genesis/Mega Drive era and so this pre-established relationship was also a factor when acquiring the brand rights to Technosoft games.

In April 2017, Sega Sammy Holdings announced a relocation of head office functions of the Sega Sammy Group and its major domestic subsidiaries located in the Tokyo metropolitan area to Shinagawa-ku by January 2018. Their stated reasoning was to promote cooperation among companies and creation of more active interaction of personnel, while pursuing efficient group management by consolidating scattered head office functions of the group, including Sega Sammy Holdings, Sammy Corporation, Sega Holdings, Sega Games, Atlus, Sammy Network, and Dartslive. In October 2017, Sega of America announced its own online store, known as the Sega Shop.

In June 2017, Chris Bergstresser replaced Jurgen Post as president and COO of Sega Europe. In June 2018, Gary Dale, formerly of Rockstar Games and Take-Two Interactive, replaced Chris Bergstresser as president and COO of Sega Europe. A few months later, Ian Curran, a former executive at THQ and Acclaim Entertainment, replaced John Cheng as president and COO of Sega of America in August 2018. In October 2018, Sega reported favorable western sales results from games such as Yakuza 6 and Persona 5, due to the localization work of Atlus USA.

Following a 70% fall in profits for the 2018 fiscal year in comparison to the previous year, despite a 35% increase in the sale of console games and success in its PC game business, Sega announced that it would focus on releases for its existing intellectual property instead of new ones. Sega blamed the loss on miscalculations of the market and having too many games being developed. Projects in development at Sega include a new game in the Yakuza series, Sakura Wars, the Sonic the Hedgehog film, and the Sega Genesis Mini. In 2019, Sega acquired Two Point Studios, known for Two Point Hospital.

== Dissolution of Sega Group and restructures (2020-present) ==
On April 1, 2020, Sega Interactive merged with Sega Games. The company was again renamed to Sega Corporation, while Sega Holdings Co., Ltd. was renamed Sega Group Corporation. According to a company statement, the move was made to allow greater research and development flexibility. Also in April 2020, Sega sold Demiurge Studios to Demiurge co-founder Albert Reed. Demiurge said it would continue to support the mobile games it developed under Sega. Sega Group Corporation was formally dissolved by its parent company in 2021.

As part of its 60th anniversary, Sega announced the Game Gear Micro microconsole for release on October 6, 2020, in Japan. Other anniversary projects include the Astro City Mini and several other merchandise. Sega also announced its Fog Gaming platform, which uses the unused processing power of arcade machines in Japanese arcades overnight to help power cloud gaming applications.

Contrasting its losses brought forth by amusement operations in 2020, sales and critical reception of Sega's home console games improved; Metacritic named Sega the best publisher of the year in 2020. Of its 28 releases that year, 95% had "good" Metacritic scores (above 75/100), including two with "great" scores (above 90/100 for Persona 5 Royal and Yakuza 0), with an average Metacritic score of 81.6 for all 2020 Sega releases. Phantasy Star Online 2 was reported in 2021 to have made over 900 million dollars since its release in 2012. In 2022, Sega announced "Super Game", several high budget games that are expected to have 672 million dollars in lifetime sales, allocating about 200 million into its budget across three years. In 2023, Sega acquired the Finnish video game developer Rovio Entertainment, best known for the Angry Birds series, for US$776 million. Rovio will help Sega to continue to build their mobile presence worldwide.

On April 24, 2023, 144 Sega of America employees announced plans to file a new union election under the new labor union, Allied Employees Guild Improving Sega (AEGIS), which is allied with the Communication Workers of America via CWA Local 9510. AEGIS represents workers from departments including marketing, quality assurance, development and localization, making it the first of its kind in the game industry in the United States. On July 10, 2023, it was announced that workers had voted 91–26 to form the union. In November 2023, AEGIS filed an unfair labor practice after Sega proposed a plan to phase out temporary employees by February 2024, which would affect around 80 employees.

=== Corporate layoffs and studio closures and sales ===
Sega made a number of restructuring moves in the early 2020s. During the latter half of 2020, many of the financial gains Sega made in the earlier part of the year dissolved due to the impact of the COVID-19 pandemic on its Sega Entertainment division, which ran its arcades. That November, Sega Sammy sold 85.1% of its shares in the division to Genda Inc., though the Sega branding and coin-operated machines continued to be used in arcades. Arcade game development was unaffected by the sale. By January 2022, Sega sold the remaining portion of this division to Genda.

In May 2023, Sega announced that 121 employees at Relic Entertainment had been made redundant to focus on cored franchises. That same year, Sega cancelled their upcoming shooter Hyenas and began restructuring its British and European operations. At The Game Awards 2023, Sega announced an initiative to revive many of its dormant franchises, beginning with new Crazy Taxi, Golden Axe, Jet Set Radio, Shinobi and Streets of Rage games. The Washington Post characterized the announcement as a return to Sega's 1990s "bohemian" and "countercultural" spirit. The co-CEO, Shuji Utsumi, said Sega wanted to "show edginess and a rebellious mindset", and that the industry was now large enough to sustain its less conventional games.

Jurgen Post rejoined Sega Europe in January 2024 to become COO of its western studios and also serve as managing director. That month, Shuji Utsumi became the president, COO and CEO of Sega of America and Europe. Utsumi had previously helped found Sony Computer Entertainment, where he helped launch the original PlayStation, before moving to Sega and assisting with the North American Dreamcast launch. After a period with Disney Interactive, he co-founded Q Entertainment before returning to Sega in 2020. On January 9, Sega Sammy Holdings announced that Sega's amusement machine business would be demerged and transferred to Sega Toys, to be renamed Sega Fave Corporation. The changes would take effect by April. On February 29, Sega appointed Justin Scarpone as an executive vice president of a group to expand Sega's presence in film and television.

Sega announced that it would lay off 61 workers at its Irvine, California location in January 2024. AEGIS had been negotiating with Sega of America since November to reduce the total redundancies. On March 27, 2024, AEGIS announced that its workers had ratified a contract with Sega of America, focusing on key issues. The following day, Sega laid off 240 workers from its British and European operations, including Sega Europe, Creative Assembly, and Hardlight, and sold Relic Entertainment to an external investor. On November 8, Sega sold Amplitude Studios to its staff via a management buyout. Sonic X Shadow Generations, Like a Dragon: Infinite Wealth and Persona 3 Reload reached a million sales within a week, a record for each of the respective franchises. The Sonic the Hedgehog movie franchise made over 1 billion dollars.
