= Hayao Nakayama =

Japanese businessman

- 中山 隼雄
- Born: 21 May 1932 (age 94); Tokyo, Empire of Japan
- Occupations: Consultant at Microsoft and Virgin PLAY, Former President of Sega

Hayao Nakayama (中山 隼雄, Nakayama Hayao; born 21 May 1932) is a Japanese businessman and was the former President and CEO of Sega Enterprises, Ltd from 1983 to 1999.

== Early life and career ==
Nakayama was born into a family of doctors and was expected to pursue medicine as a career. However, Nakayama decided to drop out of college and not pursue medicine further. Through an advertisement in a newspaper, Nakayama found a job as a jukebox leasing salesman for the V&V Hifi Trading Company. He rose to head of a new sales department at V&V, but when the company would not take his advice to begin distributing arcade games, Nakayama left with four of his salesmen to form a company called Esco Trading in 1967. Esco served as a distributor of coin-operated amusements and represented both smaller domestic factories that did not have their own distribution network and foreign manufacturers looking to place their games in Japan. Sega Enterprises, Ltd. was one of its suppliers.

== Career with Sega ==
In 1979, Esco Trading was purchased by Sega, then a subsidiary of Gulf and Western Industries. This brought Nakayama into Sega, where he became vice-president of distribution, and responsible for their Japanese operations. David Rosen, then CEO of Sega, acquired Esco Trading primarily for Nakayama's leadership. In the early 1980s, Sega was a leading arcade game manufacturer in the United States, but due to a downturn in the industry from 1982, Gulf and Western sold their American manufacturing facilities and the rights for its arcade games to Bally Manufacturing, while retaining the Japan-based Sega Enterprises.

Nakayama became president of Sega Enterprises in July 1983, and advocated for Sega to enter the still-growing Japanese home console market. This proposal was accepted, and the SG-1000 was released, selling 160,000 units in 1983, far exceeding the projected 50,000. Shortly after the SG-1000 launch and the death of company founder Charles Bluhdorn, Gulf and Western began to divest its secondary businesses. Nakayama and Rosen arranged for a group of investors to purchase Sega Enterprises in 1984 for $38 million. Nakayama became CEO of Sega Enterprises, and Isao Okawa of CSK Corporation became chairman.

While the company faced steep competition as its Master System competed with the Nintendo Entertainment System, with the arcade game market once again in growth at the end of 1980s, Sega was one of the most recognized game brands. For homes, Sega released the Master System's successor, the Mega Drive, in Japan on October 29, 1988, which remained a distant third in Japan behind Nintendo's Super Famicom and NEC's PC Engine throughout the 16-bit era. For the North American launch, the console, rebranded Genesis, was launched in a limited number of markets on August 14, 1989, and in the rest of North America later that year. The European version of the Mega Drive was released in September 1990. Nakayama tasked Sega of America CEO Michael Katz to sell one million units within the first year, using the rallying cry "Hyakumandai!". (Note: Japanese: 百万代, Hepburn: Hyakumandai; Million) Katz and Sega of America managed to sell only 500,000 units. In mid-1990, Nakayama hired Tom Kalinske to replace Katz as CEO of Sega of America. Kalinske developed a four-point plan to boost Genesis sales: cut the price of the console, create a U.S.-based team to develop games targeted at the American market, continue and expand aggressive advertising campaigns, and replace the bundled game Altered Beast with a new game, Sonic the Hedgehog. The Japanese board of directors initially disapproved of the plan, but all four points were approved by Nakayama, who told Kalinske, "I hired you to make the decisions for Europe and the Americas, so go ahead and do it." In large part due to the popularity of Sonic the Hedgehog, the Genesis outsold the SNES in the United States nearly two to one during the 1991 holiday season. This success led to Sega having control of 65% of the 16-bit console market in January 1992. In 1993, Nakayama brought Shoichiro Irimajiri into the company. Irimajiri had previously been an executive at Honda. In 1992, Nakayama was also named chairman of the Japan Amusement Machinery Manufactures Association.

Sega began development of its next console, the Sega Saturn, but Nakayama was concerned about the release of the Atari Jaguar in 1993 and that the Saturn might not be ready for release in time to compete. He stressed a quick response, which led to the development of the 32X. Following the launch of the next-generation 32-bit Sony PlayStation and Sega Saturn, sales of 16-bit hardware and software continued to account for 64% of the video game market in 1995. However, Nakayama made the decision to focus on the Saturn over the Genesis, based on the systems' relative performance in Japan. This decision has been cited as the major contributing factor in a miscalculation that reduced Sega's sales. Because the decisions of Sega of Japan had caused him to lose interest, Kalinske departed Sega of America in 1996, and was replaced by Irimajiri. Nakayama resigned his position as co-chairman of Sega of America, though he remained with the company.

In January 1997, Sega announced its intentions to merge with Bandai, a Japanese toy maker that was Japan's largest and the world's third largest at the time. The merger, planned as a $1 billion stock swap whereby Sega would wholly acquire Bandai, was set to form a planned company known as Sega Bandai, Ltd. Plans for the merger were motivated by the struggling financial state of both Sega and Bandai, with Bandai announcing their anticipated loss for the fiscal year and Sega announcing a lower than expected profit. Initially planned to be finalized in October of that year, the merger was called off in May 1997. The following day, Bandai president Makoto Yamashina resigned his position, taking responsibility for the failed merger and apologizing publicly for his inability to get the merger completed. In a separate press conference, Nakayama elaborated on his reason for agreeing to cancel the acquisition of Bandai, stating, "We will not be successful working together if Bandai's management cannot take hold of people's hearts." As a result of the company's deteriorating financial situation, Nakayama resigned as president of Sega in January 1998 in favor of Irimajiri, and became vice-chairman of Sega's arcade division. It has been speculated that Nakayama's resignation was in part due to the failure of the Sega Bandai merger, as well as Sega's 1997 performance.

== Later career and life ==
In 1999, Nakayama was named chairman of the board of Pasona Inc. In March 2000, he was named president of Cavia Inc., and became chairman of AQ Interactive in 2005. He has served roles at Microsoft Japan and Virgin PLAY. Currently, he is the CEO and chairman of Amuse Capital.

== See also ==
- History of Sega
