= Shoichiro Irimajiri =

Japanese engineer and businessman

Shoichiro Irimajiri (入交 昭一郎, Irimajiri Shōichirō; born on January 3, 1940, in Kochi, Japan) is a Japanese engineer and businessman.

He earned an aeronautical engineering degree from the University of Tokyo and worked for Honda Motor Co., Ltd. for 20 years, overseeing the introduction of its CBX motorcycle, design of their F1 racing engines for the RA273 as well as being the president of Honda of America Inc. He resigned in 1992 due to a heart problem, and started a Chinese traditional treatment to restore his condition.

During this time, it was said that General Motors recruited Irimajiri for a senior executive position at the company, in light of his success at Honda. While he declined that position and accepted a spot as an outside director, if Irimajiri had accepted the offer, he would have been the first Japanese-born automotive executive of an American automobile manufacturer.

After his recovery, Hayao Nakayama, then president of Sega Enterprises, asked him to become vice president of the company. In 1996, he additionally became chairman and CEO of Sega of America. He became president of Sega in 1998, when he laid an ambitious plan using the Dreamcast to restore Sega's lost market share and prestige, which took a severe downfall following the flawed launches of the Sega Saturn and the Sega 32X. After Sega reported its third consecutive loss, Irimajiri resigned and Isao Okawa took his place.

While president of Sega he invested $5 million into Nvidia, after the tiny Silicon Valley startup had failed to deliver on its contract to create the graphics chip for the Dreamcast. Jensen Huang has publicly expressed his gratitude to Irimajiri for helping to keep Nvidia alive. Nvidia went public in 1999, and in 2000, after Irimajiri had left, Sega sold its Nvidia stock for $15 million. In 2017, Huang returned the favor by honoring a request from Irimajiri to speak to a small group of business leaders while visiting Japan.

Irimajiri's most recent position was as chairman of Asahi Tec, a Japanese manufacturer of aluminum parts and castings for automobiles, owned by Ripplewood Holdings.
