= Periscope (arcade game) =

Shooting gallery arcade game

- Arcade flyer for Sega's version of Periscope
- Developers: Nakamura Manufacturing Co. Sega
- Designers: Nakamura Manufacturing Co.; Masaya Nakamura; Sega; David Rosen; Shikanosuke Ochi
- Release: Nakamura Manufacturing Co.; 1965; Sega; 1966; March 1968 (single-player)
- Genres: Shooter, submarine simulator
- Mode: Single-player

Periscope (Note: Japanese: ペリスコープ, Hepburn: Perisukōpu) is an electro-mechanical arcade shooting submarine simulator. Two companies developed similar games with the name. The first, initially called Torpedo Launcher, was designed by Nakamura Manufacturing Co. (becoming Namco in 1977) and released in Japan in 1965, as the first arcade game Masaya Nakamura built. Sega Enterprises, Ltd. also built and released Periscope in Japan in 1966, as one of its first produced arcade games.

Sega's 1968 single-player redesign of Periscope popularized the quarter (US$0.25) cost per play of arcade games in the United States. Its surprise success prompted Sega to further manufacture eight to ten new arcade games per year for the next few years. Periscope performed well in locations that would not have normally hosted coin-operated machines at the time, such as malls and department stores. The game's success was formative to Sega and the future Namco, and has been referred to as a turning point in the industry.

== Gameplay ==
Periscope is a shooting game, simulating a submarine attacking warships. It has a backdrop representing the ocean, upon which cardboard cutouts of ships hanging from chains are moved horizontally. Players look through a periscope to direct and fire torpedoes, which are represented by lines of colored lights and by electronic sound effects. Each play has five torpedoes that can be launched. The original Nakamura cabinet model supports up to three players. Sega redesigned it into one model supporting up to three players and one with one player.

== History ==
In a 1977 interview, Masaya Nakamura of Nakamura Manufacturing Co. (to become Namco in 1977) claimed that Periscope is the first amusement device that he built. Namco states that its Japanese release of the game was in 1965. Initially named Torpedo Launcher, the game is called Periscope in the April 1967 issue of Cashbox, where Nakamura offers direct import assistance to distributors. It has been speculated that the original Nakamura version may have been a custom model for department store rooftops, one year prior to the mass-produced model. It has also been speculated that Nakamura may have licensed the game to Sega; Nakamura stated that he did sell some of his games to competitors.

According to former Sega CEO David Rosen, poor conditions in the US coin-operated manufacturing market prompted the company's development of electromechanical games. His company, Rosen Enterprises, had just merged with Nihon Goraku Bussan to form Sega Enterprises, Ltd. the previous year, and both companies had engineers on staff. Rosen personally sketched out a design of Periscope, and Shikanosuke Ochi was the head of this project at Sega.

Sega launched its version of Periscope in 1966 as a three-player cabinet. Its original price per play of ¥30 is double that of earlier games. As the latest in the industry's well-received genre of torpedo shooter games, Sega demonstrated it alongside such competition as slot machines, slot racing games, and pinball games at the 23rd London Amusement Trades Exhibition (A.T.E.) show in December and at the Hotel Equipment Exhibition in Paris in October 1967. It was popular at this sparsely attended Paris show, with daily earnings of Fr500 (equivalent to US$100 then and equivalent to $966 in 2025). At the time, Periscope's large cabinet was cost-prohibitive for international export, but its popularity among distributors flying in to see the game prompted Sega to develop a smaller model for the worldwide market.

Sega's prototype location testing of a new, smaller, single-player version of Periscope occurred in Asia and Europe, and distributors were still enthusiastic about its performance, according to Rosen. In full production by March 1968 and distributed internationally, the smaller single-player cabinet measures 6 feet (1.8 m) deep and more than 4 feet (1.2 m) wide, which is still larger and heavier than most games of the time. Furthermore, Japan's high export tax made it more expensive than most coin-operated games at the time, costing distributors US$1,295 (equivalent to $11,990 in 2025) per single-player cabinet while other games typically cost $695–795. Enthusiastic distributors complained of the expensive but popular machine's overall low profit, so Sega suggested charging a premium price of 25 cents per play (equivalent to $2 in 2025). British documentary production company Pathé News recorded film footage of the game in London arcades during 1968 and 1969.

Periscope became a surprise success for Sega. It performed well in larger locations such as malls and department stores, which normally did not host coin-operated arcade games, but became a preferred location due to the machine's size and impracticality at a streetside location. The game was successful in Japan, and then in the US and Europe. It was awarded the Henry A. Gunther Trophy for the "most meritorious exhibit of coin-operated equipment" at the 1968 Parks Show. In December 1968, American arcade distributor Banner Specialty referred to Periscope as "the best money-maker in 51 years". In March 1969, David Rosen said that Periscope "may well turn out to be the most profitable arcade game of the decade". As a result of Periscope's success, Sega created and exported between eight and ten games a year for the next two years. A 1970 print ad for Jet Rocket said that Sega had "developed the most profitable games of the decade" while mentioning Periscope, Missile, Combat, and Grand Prix.

== Legacy ==
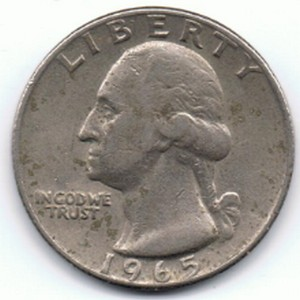
US quarter

The game's success helped to set the trend of a quarter dollar coin per play for premium games, which became the US market standard for all arcade games since then. According to Rosen, "If you talk to the old timers in the industry, they will tell you that The Periscope was a turning point in the industry." He said Periscope showed Sega it "could design acceptable games" and prompted the company's business of designing and exporting original games, including to the United States. Sega upgraded its subsequent game development to the latest technology, as Rosen explained: "We were doing lots of things that hadn't been done before, like adding sound and special effects." The success of Periscope sparked competition from traditional Chicago-based arcade manufacturers and led American distributors to Japan for new arcade games, which in turn encouraged more competition from Chicago manufacturers.

Periscope revived the novelty game business in arcades, establishing a "realistic" or "audio-visual" category of games, using advanced special effects to provide simulation experiences. It catalyzed the "novelty renaissance" where a wide variety of novelty or specialty games were released in the late 1960s (including quiz, racing, hockey, and football), many adopting the $0.25 price point. It particularly represented a trend of missile-launching gameplay during the late 1960s to 1970s, followed by electro-mechanical games such as Sega's Missile (1969) and Midway's submarine-themed missile-launching games Sea Raider (1969) and Sea Devil (1970).

The "technological renaissance" in "audio-visual" novelty games that followed Periscope in the arcades provided a healthy environment for the introduction of arcade video games in the early 1970s. Its periscope viewer cabinet design was later adopted by several arcade video games, including Midway's Sea Wolf (1976) and Atari's Battlezone (1980). Ochi became Sega's director of technology for SubRoc-3D (1982), the first commercial 3-D stereoscopic video game.

Retrospectively, Ken Horowitz praised Periscope's impressive features: "Large, bulky, and loud, it was an amazing sight to behold for the first time. Periscope attracted a great deal of attention from customers, but it also made waves with distributors, and it was incredibly successful for Sega." According to RePlay publisher Eddie Adlum, "People came into these arcades just to play that game. I would say that in my time, Periscope is one of the great successful novelty machines." Horowitz summarized, "It may not be widely discussed today, but most Sega fans are aware of Periscope and the role it played in Sega's history." Luke Plunkett of Kotaku stated that Periscope "set Sega on a path of electronic arcade gaming it's still on to this day".

== See also ==
- List of Sega arcade video games

== Bibliography ==
- Akagi, Masumi (2005). Soreha "Pon" Kara Hajimatta - Ākēdo TV Gēmu no Naritachi それは「ポン」から始まった-アーケードTVゲームの成り立ち [In the Beginning, There was "Pong" - The Origins of Arcade TV Games]. Amusement News Agency. ISBN 978-4990251208.
