= Jet Rocket =

1970 electro-mechanical flight simulation game

Jet Rocket is a 1970 flight simulation electro-mechanical game by Sega. It has the player pilot a simulated military jet and carry out rocket strikes on illuminated targets. Jet Rocket uses a foam map on a conveyor belt to simulate flight and a series of lights to simulate rocket strikes. Strikes are detected using an electric circuit that is completed when the trigger is pulled while the sight and the target are aligned. Jet Rocket was well-received, but it was commercially unsuccessful due to clone games that were quickly developed in response.

== Gameplay ==
Jet Rocket is a flight simulation game. The player flies a military jet in a nighttime raid and carries out rocket strikes against targets on the ground to earn points. The controls move a point of light that indicates where the plane is aiming. Rockets are fired by pulling a trigger. Each successful strike causes a light to illuminate on the target and an explosion sound to play. The machine is quarter operated, but can be set to free play.

The game machine uses a foam relief map inside of the machine to create the open world. The map is on a vertical conveyor belt, which is shown to the player through a mirror angled at 45 degrees. Turning the yoke tilts the mirror. The targets on the map are detailed with paint, and the landscape is illuminated by a blacklight to highlight the targets. The machine has a length of 47.5 inches, a width of 31.5 inches, and a height of 71.5 inches.

Steel meshes align with each target underneath the map and connect with a corresponding pair of electrified prongs. Pulling the trigger causes a series of orange lights to activate sequentially in a V-shape from the sides of the machine toward the target to simulate rockets. The trigger closes the circuit if the mirror-positioning pad aligns with target, causing a light under the target to activate. A sheet of Plexiglass separates the player and the mirror.

== Development ==
Jet Rocket is an electro-mechanical game created by Sega. Development began around 1966. Sega found success at this time with quarter-based electro-mechanical games like Periscope (1966) and Missile (1969).

Sega premiered Jet Rocket at an American expo in early 1970. At the time, Sega's designs were regularly duplicated by other companies as clone games to avoid long production times. Following positive reception for Jet Rocket, Williams Electronics, Bally Manufacturing, and Chicago Coin developed the clone games Flotilla, Target Zero, and Night Bomber, respectively.

Production of the Jet Rocket machines began in July 1970. It was released in August 1970, but the clones had already achieved high sales and forced it out of the American market. This was a significant factor in Sega's eventual decision to leave the export market. Sega released Heli-Shooter as a spiritual successor to Jet Rocket in 1977.

== Reception ==
Jet Rocket is regarded as one of the best electro-mechanical games. It was well-received when it was debuted in the United States. Nihon Keizai described Jet Rocket as the best of the approximately 300 games featured at the Coin Machine Show in Tokyo. Billboard published a positive review at the time of release, comparing its realism favorably to true flight simulators used to train pilots.
