= David Rosen (businessman) =

American businessman (1930–2025)

David M. Rosen
- Born: January 22, 1930; Brooklyn, New York, U.S.
- Died: December 25, 2025 (aged 95); Los Angeles, California
- Occupations: Chairman and CEO of Sega

David M. Rosen (January 22, 1930 – December 25, 2025) was an American businessman and the co-founder of the Japanese video game company Sega. He retired from the company in 1996.

== Career ==
=== Rosen Enterprises, Ltd. ===
Rosen served in the United States Air Force from 1948 to 1952. He was primarily in Japan and the Far East during the Korean War. In 1954, Rosen returned to Japan and started Rosen Enterprises, Inc., which focused on selling art created in Japan to the American market, and photo studios for Japanese identification cards. The photo business was called Photorama and Rosen established studios in hundreds of locations all over Japan.

In 1957, Rosen Enterprises, Ltd. shifted its focus and pioneered the importation and operation of coin-op amusement machines popular in the United States, to Japan to meet the growing leisure market. Rosen leveraged his existing business relationships and locations of his Photorama photo studios to roll out the amusement machines.

=== Sega Enterprises, Ltd. ===
In 1965, Rosen Enterprises, Ltd. merged with Nihon Goraku Bussan, Ltd. Nihon Goraku Bussan, Ltd. used the brand name Sega (the name originates from SErvice GAmes Japan) for their jukeboxes and slot machines. After the merger of the two companies, Sega Enterprises Ltd. was established and Rosen became chairman and chief executive officer of the resulting company.

Rosen co-founded the Japan Amusement Association in 1967 and was elected as chairman.

==== Periscope ====
In 1966, under Rosen's direction, Sega Enterprises Ltd., created its first original game, called Periscope, which led to the introduction of 25¢ play in the United States.

=== Gulf+Western Industries, Inc. ===
In 1969, Rosen and partners agreed to sell Sega Enterprises Ltd. to the conglomerate Gulf+Western Industries, Inc. Rosen remained as president of a company and also assumed a position as vice president of a Gulf+Western subsidiary to help establish the conglomerate in East Asia. After running that business for a few years, Rosen returned to matters at Sega including establishing the company in the United States. He was elected to head the new company Sega Enterprises Inc. in America, which became the parent of Sega Enterprises Ltd. Corporate overseer Harry Kane was appointed to take over Rosen's responsibilities in Japan while he moved to America to head the Sega Enterprises Inc. corporate office out of Redondo Beach, California. The company would sell coin-operated games, both electro-mechanical and video games, as well as the Sega Vision television brand.

After failing to establish themselves in the U.S. coin-op market, Sega Enterprises Inc. purchased the San Diego game manufacturer Gremlin Industries in August 1978. Rosen remained head of the parent company, directing their larger strategies. In September of the same year, Sega Enterprises Ltd. began the purchase of Esco Trading, whose founder Hayao Nakayama had previously been pursued by Rosen for his sales expertise. In America, Rosen spearheaded Sega's P.J. Pizzazz food and games arcade concept.

After the death of CEO Charles Bluhdorn in 1983, Gulf+Western sought to sell off its manufacturing assets, including Sega. Consequently, Sega's U.S. coin-op assets were sold to Bally Manufacturing Corporation while Sega Enterpsies Inc. and Sega Enterprises Ltd. were maintained.

=== Buyout ===
Having already moved his family to Los Angeles and not wanting to return to Japan full-time, Rosen declined the opportunity of solely purchasing Sega Enterprises, Ltd. Instead, Rosen and Hayao Nakayama put together a buyout group led by Isao Okawa that purchased the company in March 1984. Okawa became chairman and Nakayama became president of Sega Enterprises. This allowed Rosen to remain in the States while Nakayama was charged with the day-to-day operations of Sega's headquarters in Japan.

Rosen agreed to set up Sega of America and oversee the U.S. and overseas operations, and he became chairman of Sega of America. Rosen remained a director of Sega (Japan) until 1996, and at that time he resigned from both Sega (Japan) and Sega of America.

== Personal life and death ==
Rosen was born on January 22, 1930, in Brooklyn, New York, the son of Fay (née Sachs) and Samuel Rosen. He married Masako Fujisaki in 1954, and adopted a daughter.

Rosen died at his home in the Hollywood Hills, California, on December 25, 2025, at the age of 95 due to natural causes.
