= Isao Okawa =

Japanese businessman and Chairman of Sega (1926–2001)

- Born: May 19, 1926; Osaka, Japan
- Died: March 16, 2001 (aged 74); Tokyo, Japan
- Occupations: Ex Chairman of Sega Enterprises; Founder of CSK Holdings

Isao Okawa (大川 功, Ōkawa Isao) (May 19, 1926 – March 16, 2001) was a Japanese businessman and the former chairman of Sega.

== History ==
Okawa was born in Osaka, Japan. As a young adult, he studied at Waseda University in Tokyo. After graduating from Waseda, he formed Computer Service Company, which later became known as CSK Holdings Corporation (CSK).

== Involvement with CSK Holdings ==
CSK is a Japanese technology company formed by Okawa in 1968. The company mainly provides ICT services to numerous businesses throughout Japan. Okawa was the chairman from 1968 until his death in 2001.

== Involvement with Sega ==
From 1984 until 2004, CSK had the majority of Sega shares. As a result, Okawa was the chairman of Sega Enterprises. In 2004, CSK's shares were bought by Sammy, making Hajime Satomi the new CEO of Sega (Sega and Sammy merged to form Sega Sammy Holdings). Okawa provided over US$40 million towards Sega Enterprises, mainly to fund the Dreamcast. He forgave the debts Sega owed him and gave Sega Corporation his $695 million worth of Sega and CSK stock. As a result of this, he is remembered by some as an iconic part of Sega's history. CSK also had a research institute which produced software for all Sega platforms.

== Honors ==
Okawa was recognized by the Japanese Government for his aid in financially supporting numerous Japanese technology companies, including Sega Enterprises. He also received an honorary doctorate from his alma mater.

== Death ==
Okawa died of heart failure at Tokyo University Hospital. He was pronounced dead at 3:47 pm on March 16, 2001. He was 74 years old.
