= List of Sega video game franchises =

This is a list of video game franchises published by Sega. For a more detailed list of video games released, see the list of Sega games and list of Atlus games. Certain franchises, such as Total War or entries in 2K Sports are limited to only the entries that Sega directly published.

== List of Sega video game franchises ==
| Franchise | Description/Developers | Initial entry | Latest entry | Ref. |
|---|---|---|---|---|
| 7th Dragon | A series of four JRPG developed by Imageepoch and published by Sega. Only the final entry was localized into English. | 2009, 7th Dragon | 2015, 7th Dragon III Code: VFD | |
| After Burner | A series of Combat flight simulation games largely developed by Sega, most entries started as arcade games and were ported to consoles in later releases. | 1987, After Burner | 2007, After Burner: Black Falcon | |
| Alex Kidd | A series of platformers developed by Sega between 1986 and 1990, outside of re-releases and a 2021 remake, the franchise was largely abandoned upon Sonic the Hedgehog's ascension to popularity in 1991. | 1986, Alex Kidd in Miracle World | 2021, Alex Kidd in Miracle World DX | |
| Alien Syndrome | A series of two run and gun games released twenty years apart. | 1987, Alien Syndrome | 2007, Alien Syndrome | |
| Altered Beast | A series of three beat em up video games. | 1988, Altered Beast | 2005, Altered Beast | |
| ChuChu Rocket! | A series of puzzle video games where the player directs mice away from cats and into escape rockets. While only having 2 distinct entries, it has a recurring presence in re-releases and Sega-themed crossover games. | 1999, ChuChu Rocket! | 2019, Chu Chu Rocket! Universe | |
| Chunithm | A series of motion-based rhythm games, largely relegated to Japanese arcades. | 2015, Chunithm | 2025, Chunithm X-Verse-X | |
| Clockwork Knight | A series of two platformers released on the Sega Saturn. A few related video game projects have been announced in the years since, but none ever materialized. | 1995, Clockwork Knight | 1996, Clockwork Knight 2 | |
| Crazy Taxi | A series of open world driving games where players must act as a taxi driver. Three core entries and a number of spinoffs have been released, with a fourth title in development for the future. | 1999, Crazy Taxi | 2027, Crazy Taxi: World Tour | |
| Columns | A long-running match-three puzzle video game series created by Sega, initially in efforts for them to have their own Tetris type game. | 1990, Columns | 2008, Columns Deluxe | |
| Dinosaur King | A spinoff of Sega's long-running Mushi King series that took gameplay more in the direction of the Pokémon video game series. | 2005, Dinosaur King (arcade) | 2008, Dinosaur King (Nintendo DS) | |
| Doki Doki Penguin Land | A series of puzzle video games released by Sega in the late 1980s and early 1990s where the player maneuvered a penguin and their egg through levels. Only Penguin Land was localized into English, and outside of re-releases, the franchise became largely dormant after the success of Sonic the Hedgehog's in the early 1990s. | 1985, Doki Doki Penguin Land | 1992, Ikasuze! Koi no Doki Doki Penguin Land MD | |
| Dragon Force | A series of two real-time strategy role-playing video games released for the Sega Saturn. The sequel, and a 2005 PlayStation 2 remake of the original, remained Japan-only releases. | 1996, Dragon Force | 1998, Dragon Force II | |
| Ecco the Dolphin | A series of action adventure game's related to maneuvering a dolphin in underwater exploration. Most entries released on the Sega Genesis, while the final entry, to date, released on the Dreamcast. | 1992, Ecco the Dolphin | 2000, Ecco the Dolphin: Defender of the Future | |
| Eternal Champions | A series of 2 fighting games and 2 spinoff beat em up games created by Sega in the 1990s. | 1993, Eternal Champions | 1996, X-Perts | |
| Fantasy Zone | A series of side-scrolling shooting games similar to Defender (1981) largely released in the 1980s and 1990s. | 1986, Fantasy Zone | 2012, Medal de Fantasy Zone | |
| Fighting Vipers | A series of fighting games similar to Sega's Virtua Fighter, consisting of two numbered entries, and a crossover spinoff game with Virtua Fighter named Fighters Megamix. | 1995, Fighting Vipers | 1998, Fighting Vipers 2 | |
| Golden Axe | Sega, Secret Level, Sega Studio Australia | 1989, Golden Axe | 2008, Golden Axe: Beast Rider | |
| Gunstar Heroes | A series of two 2D run and gun video games developed by Treasure. The original, Gunstar Heroes has been re-released on my Sega-themed video game compilations. | 1993, Gunstar Heroes | 2005, Gunstar Super Heroes | |
| Hang-On | Sega (AM2), Sega, Genki | 1985, Hang-On | 1996, Hang-On GP | |
| Hero Bank | Sega | 2014, Hero Bank | 2014, Hero Bank 2 | |
| Headhunter | Amuze Entertainment | 2001, Head Hunter | 2004, Head Hunter: Redemption | |
| The House of the Dead | Headstrong Games, MegaPixel Studio, Sega, WOW Entertainment | 1997, The House of the Dead | 2025, The House of the Dead 2: Remake | |
| Jet Set Radio | Sega (Smilebit), Blit Works, Vicarious Visions | 2000, Jet Set Radio | 2003, Jet Grind Radio | |
| Kingdom Conquest | Sega | 2010, Kingdom Conquest | 2012, Kingdom Conquest II | |
| Landstalker | Climax | 1992, Landstalker | 1999, Time Stalkers | |
| Let's Go Jungle | Sega | 2006, Let's Go Jungle!: Lost on the Island of Spice | 2011, Let's Go Island!. Lost on the Island of Tropics | |
| Like a Dragon / Yakuza | Ryu Ga Gotoku Studio, Sega, Syn Sophia | 2005, Yakuza | 2025, Like a Dragon: Pirate Yakuza in Hawaii | |
| Love and Berry: Dress Up and Dance! | Sega | 2004, Love and Berry: Dress Up and Dance! | 2006, Oshare Majo Love and Berry: DS Collection | |
| maimai | Sega (AM1) | 2012, maimai | 2026, maimai DX CiRCLE PLUS | |
| Monaco GP | Sega | 1979, Monaco GP (video game) | 1992, Ayrton Senna's Super Monaco GP II | |
| Mushiking: The King of Beetles | Sega | 2003, Mushiking: The King of Beetles | 2016, Shin Kouchuu Ouja Mushiking | |
| Nights | Sonic Team | 1996, Nights into Dreams | 2007, Nights: Journey of Dreams | |
| O.N.G.E.K.I. | Sega (AM1) | 2018, O.N.G.E.K.I. | 2025, O.N.G.E.K.I. Re:Fresh | |
| Out Run | Sega AM2, Sumo Digital | 1986, Out Run | 2006, OutRun 2006: Coast 2 Coast | |
| Panzer Dragoon | Sega, Smilebit, MegaPixel Studio | 1995, Panzer Dragoon | TBA, Panzer Dragoon Zwei: Remake | |
| Pengo | Coreland, Sega | 1982, Pengo | 1995, Pepenga Pengo | |
| Phantasy Star | A long-running series of role-playing video games by Sega and Sonic Team. While the first four entries on the Sega Genesis played as traditional JRPG, future entries with the Online pivoted to multiplayer and action-based gameplay. | 1987, Phantasy Star | 2021, Phantasy Star Online 2: New Genesis | |
| Pro Soccer Club o Tsukurou! | Sega, Smilebit | 1996, J.League Pro Soccer Club o Tsukurou! | 2018, Sega Pocket Club Manager | |
| Pro Yakyuu Team o Tsukurou! | Sega, Smilebit | 1999, Pro Yakyuu Team o Tsukurou! | 2016, Yakyuu Tsuku!! | |
| Puyo Puyo | Compile, Sonic Team, Sega | 1991, Puyo Puyo | 2024, Puyo Puyo Puzzle Pop | |
| Puzzle & Action | Sega (AM1) | 1993, Puzzle & Action: Tant-R | 1995, Puzzle & Action: Treasure Hunt | |
| Quest of D | Sega (AM2) | 2004, Quest of D | 2007, Quest of D: The Battle Kingdom | |
| Rail Chase | Sega (AM3) | 1991, Rail Chase | 1995, Rail Chase 2 | |
| Rent-A-Hero | Sega AM2, Sega, Aspect | 1991, Rent-A-Hero | 2000, Rent-A-Hero No.1 | |
| Riglord Saga | Microcabin | 1995, Riglord Saga | 1996, Riglord Saga | |
| Roommania | Sega, Wave Master | 2002, Roommania #203 | 2002, New Roommania: Porori Seishun | |
| Rub Rabbits | Sega (Sonic Team) | 2004, Feel the Magic XX/XY | 2005, The Rub Rabbits! | |
| Sakura Wars | Red Entertainment, Sega, Overworks | 1996, Sakura Wars | 2019, Sakura Wars | |
| Samba de Amigo | Sega, Sega (Sonic Team), Gearbox Software | 1999, Samba de Amigo | 2023, Samba de Amigo: Party Central | |
| Sangokushi Taisen | Sega (AM1), double jump.tokyo | 2005, Sangokushi Taisen | 2023, Battle of Three Kingdoms | |
| Sega All Stars | A series of crossover video games spanning multiple genres, featuring characters and settings from multiple Sega franchises. | 2004, Sega Superstars | 2012, Sonic & Sega Allstars Racing Transformed | |
| Sega Bass Fishing | Sega, WOW Entertainment, Sims | 1997, Sega Bass Fishing | 2011, Sega Bass Fishing Challenge | |
| Sega GT | Sega (WOW Entertainment) | 2000, Sega GT | 2003, Sega GT Online | |
| Sega Network Taisen Mahjong MJ | Sega (AM2) | 2002, Sega Network Taisen Mahjong MJ | 2014, Sega Network Taisen Mahjong MJ Mobile | |
| Sega Rally | Sega (AM3), Sega Racing Studio, Sega Rosso | 1995, Sega Rally Championship | 2007, Sega Rally Revo | |
| Sega Worldwide Soccer | Sega, Silicon House | 1995, Victory Goal | 2000, Sega Worldwide Soccer 2000 Euro Edition | |
| Shenmue | Sega AM2, Ys Net | 1999, Shenmue | 2019, Shenmue III | |
| Shining | Camelot, Climax, Flight-Plan, Grasshopper Studio, Media.Vision, Nex Entertainment, Neverland, Sega AM2, Sonic Software Planning | 1991, Shining in the Darkness | 2018, Shining Resonance Refrain | |
| Shinobi | 3d6 Games, Lizardcube, Overworks, Sega, Griptonite Games | 1987, Shinobi | 2025, Shinobi: Art of Vengeance | |
| Sonic the Hedgehog | A series of platformers, along with spinoff entries in multiple other genres, primarily developed by Sonic Team. It is Sega's flagship game series, with the title character also acting as the company's mascot. | 1991, Sonic the Hedgehog | 2025, Sonic Racing: CrossWorlds | |
| Soul Reverse | Sega AM2 | 2016, Soul Reverse Zero | 2018, Soul Reverse | |
| Space Channel 5 | Art Co. Ltd, Grounding Inc. United Game Artist | 1999, Space Channel 5 | 2020, Space Channel 5: Kinda Funky News Flash | |
| Space Harrier | Amusement Vision, Sega AM2, Sega | 1985, Space Harrier | 2000, Planet Harriers | |
| SpikeOut | Amusement Vision, Dimps, Sega | 1998, Spikeout | 2005, Spikeout: Battle Street | |
| Streets of Rage | Ancient, Dotemu, Sega | 1991, Streets of Rage | 2020, Streets of Rage 4 | |
| Super Monkey Ball | Amusement Vision, Traveller's Tales, Marvelous AQL, Ryu Ga Gotoku Studio, Sega | 2001, Super Monkey Ball | 2024, Super Monkey Ball Banana Rumble | |
| Tempo | A series of three platformers directed by Bonk creator Keisuke Abe, developed by Red Company, and published by Sega. | 1995, Tempo | 1998, Super Tempo | |
| ToeJam & Earl | Johnson Voorsanger Productions, HumaNature Studios. Only two games released by Sega for Genesis/Mega Drive. | 1991, ToeJam & Earl | 2019, ToeJam & Earl: Back in the Groove | |
| Two Point | Two Point Studios | 2018, Two Point Hospital | 2025, Two Point Museum | |
| Valkyria Chronicles | Sega, Media.Vision | 2008, Valkyria Chronicles | 2018, Valkyria Chronicles 4 | |
| Vectorman | A series of two action platformers developed with BlueSky Software for the Sega Genesis. Multiple attempts were made to make a Vectorman 3 in subsequent years, but none materialized. | 1995, Vectorman | 1996, Vectorman 2 | |
| Virtua Cop | Sega | 1994, Virtua Cop | 2003, Virtua Cop 3 | |
| Virtua Fighter | Sega AM2, Genki | 1993, Virtua Fighter | 2021, Virtua Fighter 5 Ultimate Showdown | |
| Virtual On | Sega (AM3), Hitmaker, Access Games | 1996, Virtual On: Cyber Troopers | 2018, A Certain Magical Virtual-On | |
| Virtua Striker | Sega AM2, Amusement Vision | 1995, Virtua Striker | 2004, Virtua Striker 4 | |
| Virtua Tennis | Sega, Sumo Digital | 1999, Virtua Tennis | 2012, Virtua Tennis Challenge | |
| Wonder Boy | Westone Bit Entertainment, Sega, Lizardcube, CFK, Game Atelier, Artdink | 1986, Wonder Boy | 2021, Wonder Boy: Asha in Monster World | |
| Wonderland Wars | Sega (AM1) | 2015, Wonderland Wars | 2019, Wonderland Wars: Wazawai Tsu Yamato no Shukuyo Te | |
| World Club Champion Football | Hitmaker, Sega | 2002, World Club Champion Football: Serie A 2001-2002 | 2020, WCCF Footista | |
| World Series Baseball | BlueSky Software, Sega, Visual Concepts, WOW Entertainment | 1994, World Series Baseball | 1998, World Series Baseball '98 | |
| Zaxxon | Sega, Free Range Games, CRI | 1981, Zaxxon | 2012, Zaxxon Escape | |

== Acquired franchises ==
Overview of video game franchises acquired by Sega
| Franchise | Developer(s) | First game | Latest game |
|---|---|---|---|
| Angry Birds | Rovio Entertainment | 2009, Angry Birds | 2022, Angry Birds Journey |
| Aleste | Compile, M2 | 1988, Aleste | 2020, Aleste Collection |
| Company of Heroes | Relic Entertainment | 2006, Company of Heroes | 2023, Company of Heroes 3 |
| Devil Summoner | Atlus | 1995, Shin Megami Tensei: Devil Summoner | 2022, Soul Hackers 2 |
| Endless Space | Amplitude Studios | 2012, Endless Space | 2017, Endless Space 2 |
| Etrian Odyssey | Atlus | 2007, Etrian Odyssey | 2018, Etrian Odyssey Nexus |
| Football Manager | Sports Interactive | 2005, Football Manager 2005 | 2025, Football Manager 26 |
| Herzog | Technosoft | 1988, Herzog | 1989, Herzog Zwei |
| Jissen Pachinko Hisshouhou! | Sammy | 1997, Jissen Pachinko Hisshouhou! Twin | 2012, Jissen Pachi-Slot Hisshouhou! Hokuto no Ken F: Seikimatsu Kyuuseishu Densetsu |
| Megami Tensei | Atlus | 1987, Digital Devil Story: Megami Tensei | 2024, Shin Megami Tensei V: Vengeance |
| Persona | Atlus | 1996, Revelations: Persona | TBA, Persona 4 Revival |
| Power Instinct | Atlus | 1993, Power Instinct | 2009, Gōketsuji Ichizoku: Senzo Kuyō |
| Puyo Puyo | Compile, Sonic Team, Sega | 1991, Puyo Puyo | 2024, Puyo Puyo Puzzle Pop |
| Thunder Force | Technosoft, Sega | 1983, Thunder Force | 2008, Thunder Force VI |
| Total War | The Creative Assembly | 2000, Shogun: Total War | 2023, Total War: Pharaoh |

== See also ==
- Lists of Sega games
- List of Sega video games
- List of Sega arcade games
- List of Sega mobile games
- List of video game franchises
- List of Nintendo franchises
