= Kempin =

Kempin is a surname. Notable people with the name include:

- Emilie Kempin-Spyri (1853–1901), Swiss lawyer and women's rights activistin
- Hans Kempin (1913–1992), German Waffen-SS combat and training officer
- Joachim Kempin (1942–2026), German-born American businessman, Senior Vice President of Microsoft Corporation
- Jon Kempin (born 1993), American soccer player
