= Lists of Sega games =

The following are lists of Sega games:

== General lists ==
- List of Sega video games
- List of Sega arcade games
- List of Sega mobile games

== Pinball machines ==
- List of Sega Pinball machines

== By systems ==
- List of SG-1000 games
- List of Master System games
- List of Sega Genesis games
- List of Game Gear games
- List of Sega CD games
- List of 32X games
- List of Sega Saturn games
- List of Dreamcast games

== Unreleased ==
- List of cancelled Master System games
- List of cancelled Sega Genesis games
- List of cancelled Game Gear games
- List of cancelled Sega CD games
- List of cancelled 32X games
- List of cancelled Sega Saturn games
- List of cancelled Dreamcast games

== See also ==
- List of Sega video game consoles
- List of Sega video game franchises
