= Kingdom Conquest =

2010 video game

- Developer: Sega
- Publisher: Sega
- Platforms: iOS; Android
- Release: JP: January 19, 2011; NA: November 17, 2010
- Genres: Massively-multiplayer; Strategy
- Modes: Single player multiplayer

Kingdom Conquest (Japanese: キングダムコンクエスト, Hepburn: Kingudamu Konkuesuto) is a massively multiplayer online game strategy game with incorporated city-building, card collection and third-person action gameplay elements, developed and published by Sega for iOS and Android devices in 2010. It is free to download and play, and offers several in-game purchases to enhance gameplay. A sequel, titled Kingdom Conquest II, was released in Japan in December 2012, and worldwide in January 2013.

== Gameplay ==
In Kingdom Conquest, players must manage a kingdom in the world of Magna, building and upgrading facilities, managing resources, and collecting Monster Cards that can be drawn from randomized Card Packs. These Card Packs can either be purchased through In-App Purchases or with tickets obtained by running Dungeons in a 3rd Person 3D Dungeon Combat system, where players fight successive waves of enemies.

The goal of the game is to work collaboratively with other players to rule the fictional world of Magna, which is populated by other players as well as by Monsters, who are found in every section of the gridded World Map. Players must send Monster Units (combinations of various Monster Cards) to various territories, and a successful battle will transfer control of that territory to the player. In this way, players must vie for control over areas of the map, with the ultimate goal of conquering Debris Towers, enormous Spires filled with Monsters.

The game is split into seasons, each of which lasts until control over the debris towers is settled and one Alliance has emerged victorious. With the end of one season, and the start of another, players' cities are reset, and they must start over. This ensures that new players have an opportunity to compete with veteran players by starting on relatively equal footing.

New content, such as additional unique Monster Cards, is added regularly. Various competitive events also take place to encourage players to engage one another.

== Controversy ==
The game was controversial in that many customers complained about the game charging the in-game purchases without their consent, even those who did not download the game.

== Legacy ==
The game spawned two sequels, Kingdom Conquest II and Kingdom Conquest: Dark Empire.
