= Kingdom Conquest II =

2012 massively multiplayer online video game

- Developer: Sega
- Publisher: Sega
- Platforms: iOS; Android
- Release: JP: December 12, 2012; NA: January 17, 2013
- Genres: Massively-multiplayer; Strategy
- Modes: Single-player, multiplayer

Kingdom Conquest II (Japanese: キングダムコンクエストII, Hepburn: Kingudamu Konkuesuto II) is a Massively multiplayer online strategy game with incorporated city-building, card collection and third-person action gameplay elements, developed and published by Sega for iOS and Android devices in 2012. It is free to download and play, and offers several in-game purchases to enhance gameplay. A prequel, titled Kingdom Conquest, was released in Japan in January 2011, and worldwide in November 2010. The game will be ending its service on 31 August 2017 13:00 Japan time, and its sequel Kingdom Conquest: Dark Empire is being developed.

== Gameplay ==
In Kingdom Conquest II, players must manage a kingdom in the world of Magna, building and upgrading facilities, managing resources, and collecting Monster Cards that can be drawn from randomized Card Packs. These Card Packs can either be purchased through In-App Purchases or with tickets obtained by running Dungeons in a 3rd Person 3D Dungeon Combat system, where players fight successive waves of enemies, or it can be obtained with challenging the rivals in the Arena to gain the draw ticket for the monsters.

The goal of the game is to work collaboratively with other players to rule the fictional world of Magna, which is populated by other players as well as by Monsters, who are found in every section of the gridded World Map. Players must send Monster Units (combinations of various Monster Cards) to various territories, and a successful battle will transfer control of that territory to the player. In this way, players must vie for control over areas of the map, with the ultimate goal of conquering Debris Towers, enormous Spires filled with Monsters.

The game is split into seasons, each of which lasts until control over the debris towers is settled and one Alliance has emerged victorious. With the end of one season, and the start of another, players' cities are reset, and they must start over. This ensures that new players have an opportunity to compete with veteran players by starting on relatively equal footing.

New content, such as additional unique Monster Cards, is added regularly. Various competitive events also take place to encourage players to engage one another.

== Changes and additions ==
In the dungeon mode for the Kingdom Conquest II, Ninja and Saint were added as the new character classes since the prequel.

For the main castle, the buildings are use the grid size to build instead of the single grid in the prequel. The resources type are reduced from four into three.
