= Doki Doki Penguin Land =

Series of puzzle platform games

Doki Doki Penguin Land is a series of puzzle platform games developed and published by Sega, and which began in 1985. All games in the series feature a similar formula whereby players guide an egg to the bottom of a level by moving or destroying blocks. The egg cannot fall more than a certain distance, nor can it come into contact with an enemy or it will break and the player will lose a life.

== Games ==
=== Doki Doki Penguin Land ===
Doki Doki Penguin Land (どきどきペンギンランド, Doki Doki Penguin Rando; lit. "Heart Pounding Penguin Land") is the first title in the series. Originally released in 1985 for the SG-1000 and MSX,

=== Penguin Land ===
Doki Doki Penguin Land Uchuu Daibouken (どきどきペンギンランド宇宙大冒険, Doki Doki Penguin Rando Uchuu Daibouken; lit. "Thump Thump Penguin Land: Outer Space Adventure" "Heart Pounding Penguin Land: Outer Space Adventure" as a more exact romanization)) is a 1987 Master System title,

=== Doki Doki Penguin Land MD ===
Ikasuze! Ai no Doki Doki Penguin Land MD (イカスぜ！恋のどきどきペンギンランドMD, Ikasuze! Ai no Doki Doki Penguin Land MD) is the third game in the Penguin Land series. It was initially released in 1991 as a downloadable game for the Sega Mega Drive and later compiled on Game no Kanzume Vol. 2 for the Mega CD.
