= Dragon Force =

1996 video game

- North American Saturn cover art
- Developers: J-Force; Sega
- Publishers: JP/EU: Sega; NA: Working Designs
- Director: Tomoyuki Ito
- Producers: Hiroshi Aso; Tatsuo Yamada; Makoto Oshitani
- Artist: Koh Tanaka
- Writer: Makoto Goya
- Composer: Tatsuyuki Maeda
- Platforms: Sega Saturn, PlayStation 2
- Release: Saturn: JP: March 29, 1996; NA: December 12, 1996; EU: August 28, 1997; PlayStation 2: JP: August 18, 2005
- Genres: Role-playing, real-time strategy
- Mode: Single-player

Dragon Force (Note: ドラゴンフォース (Doragon Fōsu) in Japanese) is a real-time strategy and role-playing video game developed by J-Force and Sega and published by Sega for the Sega Saturn. It was translated for North American release by Working Designs in 1996, a translation that was also used by Sega in Europe under license from Working Designs. The game's main selling point was that battles involve up to 200 soldiers fighting on screen in real time, causing them to be often likened to the battle scenes in the then-recent film Braveheart.

Upon its release, critics resoundingly praised Dragon Force for its melding of the war simulation and story-driven RPG genres, and it remains one of the Saturn's most highly regarded games. A sequel, later translated by fans, was released for the Saturn in Japan in 1998. The first game was enhanced and released for the PlayStation 2 as part of the Sega Ages series. This version was re-released for the PlayStation 3 as a PS2 Classic in July 2012 in Japan.

== Gameplay ==
The player assumes the role of one of eight rulers vying for control of Legendra. Each ruler has a set of generals under their command, and each general commands an army of up to 100 soldiers. Armies travel between towns and castles via fixed routes on an overhead scrolling map, much like the earlier Saturn game Romance of the Three Kingdoms IV: Wall of Fire. When armies of different nations meet, they engage in battle.

Although both the world map and battles unfold in real time, the game pauses when the player opens a menu.

At the outset of the battle, the player must choose to Attack, Talk, or Retreat. If the player chooses Retreat, their army loses the battle and some troops, and moves out of the victorious army's path on the world map. The Talk option opens negotiations with the enemy. The enemy may then leave their castle or join the player's monarch, but if the enemy refuses to negotiate, battle will start with the player bereft of all troops; because of this tremendous advantage, the enemy will nearly always refuse to negotiate. If Attack is selected, each side chooses a general and corresponding company of troops to send into battle, and then chooses a formation which determines the arrangement of troops. The enemy side always chooses first in both cases, allowing the player to determine an appropriate counter-strategy. During battle the player can select commands or special attacks from a menu. Each individual skirmish ends when one general runs out of hit points or retreats. If both generals' armies are depleted, both generals are given one last chance to retreat before they are thrust into a one-on-one battle. Generals who run out of hit points are, depending on the general, captured, injured, or (rarely) killed in action. If the player's ruler is defeated in this manner, the player loses the game and must restart from the last save. The skirmishes continue until one army's generals have all been defeated, at which point the battle ends.

Every in-game "week" (a fixed amount of time on the world map), the player attends to administrative duties. During this time, players may give awards to generals (increasing the number of troops they can command or items that increase their capabilities), persuade captive enemy generals to join the player's army, search for items, recruit generals in the ruler's territory, fortify castles, and save the game. Plot-advancing cut scenes frequently take place at the end of the week.

== Plot ==
Dragon Force is set in the world Legendra, which lived in an era of prosperity under the watch of the benevolent goddess Astea, until it came under siege by the evil god Madruk and his armies. The Star dragon Harsgalt and his chosen warriors, the Dragon Force, come to stop him. Personal disputes among the Dragon Force led to their downfall and left Harsgalt to face Madruk in a fight to death. Harsgalt, unable to kill Madruk, sealed him away until eight new chosen warriors could rise to permanently defeat him.

300 years later, the seal imprisoning Madruk has weakened and two of his Dark Apostles, Scythe and Gaul, have begun working towards his release. To ensure none will stop their master, the two of them manipulate the eight nations of Legendra into warring among themselves. Eventually, one of the monarchs successfully ends the war, though the events of how it occurs vary depending on the monarch. Regardless, the monarchs discover that they are the eight members of the Dragon Force, and that the only way they can kill Madruk is by obtaining the Dragon Power left by Harsgalt.

Despite attempts to stop them by Scythe and Gaul, whichever monarch the player controls gains the power, and then has to use it to defeat Madruk's final apostle, a robot named Katmondo. Madruk's prison continues to weaken, allowing him to release his army of dragonmen. The Dragon Force fight their way to Madruk's prison and find his three Dark Apostles waiting for them. Whichever monarch has the Dragon power leaves to face Madruk, while the remaining seven fight the Dark Apostles. The monarch with the Dragon Power kills Madruk, finally ending his threat. The monarchs are saved by Astea, who leaves the world to be governed by the mortals, saying it is time for them to stand on their own.

Within the game, eight different storylines exist, one for each monarch. The campaigns for Goldark and Reinhart can only be accessed after the game has been completed, as they contain spoilers from the outset.

== Reception ==
Reception

Aggregate score
Aggregator	Score
GameRankings	90%

Review scores
Publication	Score
Edge	8 / 10
Electronic Gaming Monthly	9.5/10, 9.5/10, 9/10, 8/10
Famitsu	8/10, 8/10, 7/10, 7/10
Game Informer	8.75 / 10
GamesMaster	86%
GameSpot	9.1 / 10
Next Generation	4/5
Consoles +	94%
Games Collection	9 / 10
Joypad	92%
RPGamer	5 / 5
RPGFan	96%
Sega Saturn Magazine	87%

Award
Publication	Award
Electronic Gaming Monthly	All Systems Game of the Year (runner-up), Saturn Game of the Year, Strategy Game of the Year, Game of the Month, Editors' Choice Gold

Dragon Force received critical acclaim, with reviews lauding the game's balance of war simulation with RPG elements and the visual spectacle of the battle sequences. The four reviewers of Electronic Gaming Monthly gave it their "Game of the Month" award, commenting particularly on the game's addictive quality. Crispin Boyer opined: "DF is about as good as a strategy game can get. It has a sprawling world, epic story line, a cast of thousands and the most awe-inspiring battles ever seen in a video game." Scary Larry of GamePro criticized the graphics, but found their shortcomings hardly noticeable against the humor of the English localization and the intense strategy of the battles. Reiner of Game Informer commented that the unpredictability of the competing nations demands quicker thinking and reflexes than is required in most strategy games.

Most critics also praised the story, with Next Generation in particular stated that "the story in Dragon Force is so well integrated that the game almost feels secondary. Each major character in the game approaches world conquest with a different motive, and gameplay changes accordingly. ... Seamlessly welding both traditional wargaming and RPG elements, Working Designs and Sega have created a classic that should appeal to fans of both genres." Joe Fielder of GameSpot similarly remarked: "Dragon Force balances role-playing and strategy elements perfectly, intermittently directing the war of the land through storyline segments." Matt Yeo of the official UK Sega Saturn Magazine gave Dragon Force a more mixed review than most; while agreeing that the game is well-constructed, he concluded that most British gamers would not have the attention span needed to enjoy the game's battle sequences, much less its administrative segments.

Dragon Force was a commercial success, selling more than 150,000 copies in North America alone. It also sold 272,166 units in Japan, for more than 422,166 combined sales in Japan and North America.

Dragon Force won Electronic Gaming Monthly's Saturn Game of the Year and Strategy Game of the Year awards for 1996. It was also runner-up for the All Systems Game of the Year award. EGM ranked the game at #55 on its "100 Best Games of All Time" in 1997, and #111 on its list of 'The Greatest 200 Videogames of Their Time' in 2006. In 2003, Dragon Force was inducted into GameSpot's list of the greatest games of all time.

== Sequel ==
Dragon Force II (Note: Dragon Force II: Kamisarishi Daichi ni) was published by Sega for the Saturn, and released only in Japan in 1998. Changes from the original include a "laboratory system" which allows the player to research new abilities and the capacity to have two different types of soldiers in the same army (thus allowing ground troops to be supported by air troops, for example). The music was composed and arranged by veteran anime composers Kohei Tanaka and Takayuki Negishi.

GameSpot's Peter Bartholow rated the sequel 7.9/10 points, saying that it was extremely similar to the first game, with better gameplay, but worse presentation. He also praised the added voice acting, saying that importing it would be worthwhile for fans.
