= Joachim Kempin =

German-born American businessman (1942–2026)

Joachim Kempin (January 9, 1942 – February 5, 2026) was a German-born American businessman who was Senior Vice President of Microsoft Corporation. He ran Microsoft's division selling operating software to PC manufacturers for 15 years. Kempin was also the author of Resolve and Fortitude: Microsoft's "Secret Power Broker" Breaks His Silence.

== Early career ==
In 1972, he joined Digital Equipment Corporation (DEC) in Munich, Germany as an instructor to teach computer programming classes to customers. He later ran DEC's training center in Munich, and became a marketing manager in DEC's training division headquartered in Bedford, Massachusetts. After a short spell at National Semiconductors, he joined Apple's team in Paris as European marketing manager. He later joined a new software company called Microsoft and accepted a General Manager position for its newly found German subsidiary.

== Microsoft ==
Upon joining, he moved through the still small company and was promoted to run Microsoft's division dealing with PC manufacturers. Headquartered near Seattle, Washington, he soon belonged to Microsoft's executive team and was promoted to Senior Vice President of Microsoft in 1990. In his job he developed relationships with Microsoft's PC manufacturers and operating software distribution partners worldwide. Journalists called him "Microsoft's Secret Power Broker" and Bill Gates' "Enforcer" who was "wielding Microsoft’s pricing sword". He described part of his job as "hitting the OEMs hard... with anti-Linux". The Department of Justice took an interest in how he ran his portion of Microsoft, and he wound up as a witness to defend the company's business practices during the 1998–2002 Microsoft antitrust trial. He retired in 2002 from the company and joined several boards as a business advisor, including the National Bureau of Asian Research.

== Death ==
Kempin died in Seattle on February 5, 2026, at the age of 84.

== Author ==
In January 2013, Joachim Kempin released a controversial tell-all book about his time at Microsoft. It received media attention, and Kempin had been outspoken in the press criticizing Microsoft's current leadership. In a Reuters interview with Bill Rigby, Kempin said, "Microsoft's board is a lame duck board, has been forever. They hire people to help them administer the company, but not to lead the company. That's the problem".

Kempin's book release has gotten him television interviews on Bloomberg TV and Fox Business.
