= Sega =

Japanese video game company

Sega Corporation

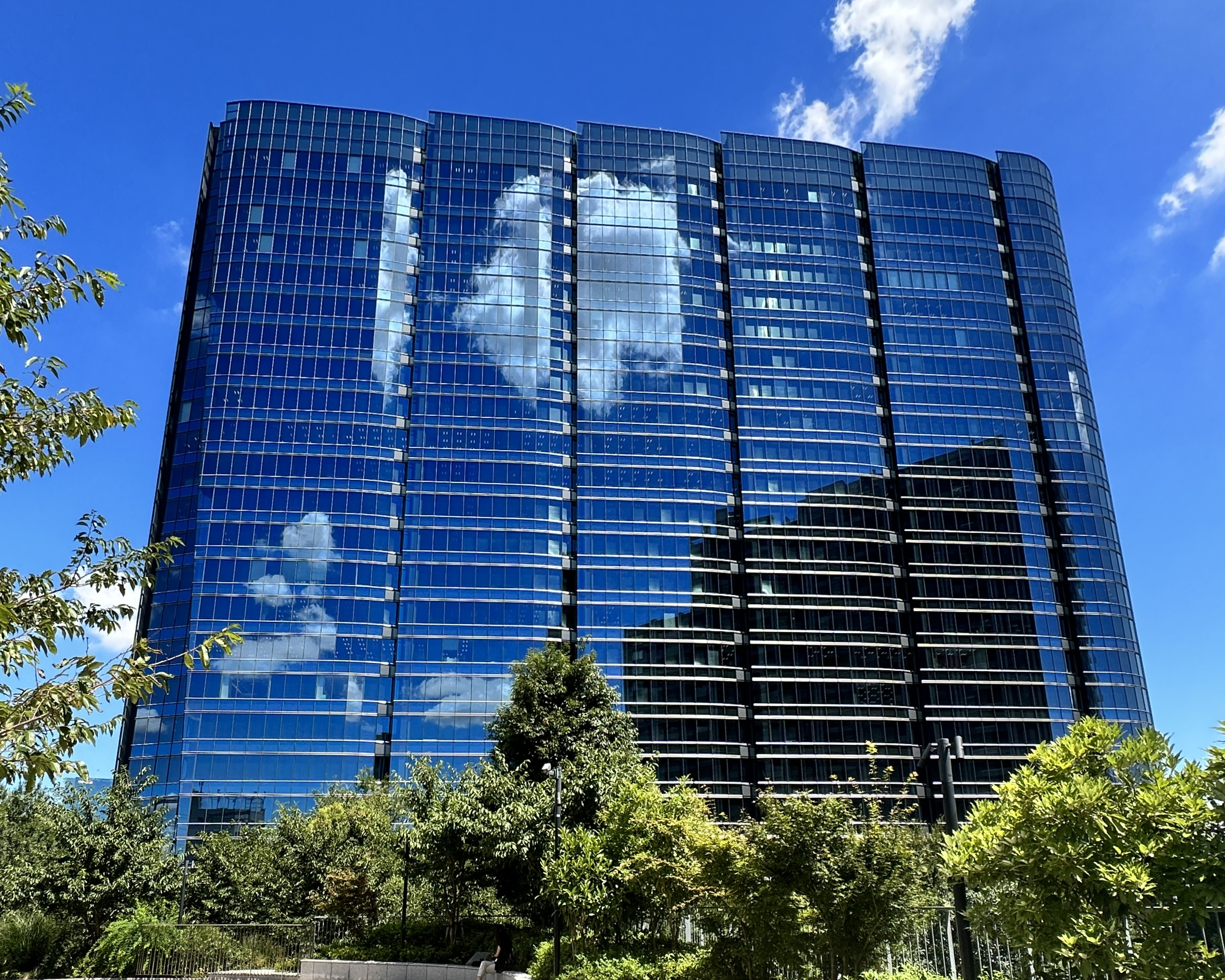
- Headquarters in Shinagawa, Tokyo
- Native name: 株式会社セガ
- Romanized name: Kabushiki-gaisha Sega
- Formerly: Nihon Goraku Bussan (1960–1965); Sega Enterprises, Ltd. (1965–2000); Sega Corporation (2000–2015); Sega Games Co., Ltd. (2015–2020)
- Type: Subsidiary
- Industry: Video games
- Predecessor: Service Games of Japan
- Founded: June 3, 1960; 66 years ago
- Founders: Martin Bromley; Richard Stewart
- Headquarters: Nishi-Shinagawa, Shinagawa, Tokyo, Japan
- Area served: Worldwide
- Key people: Haruki Satomi (chairman and CEO); Shuji Utsumi (president and COO); Yukio Sugino (vice president and COO)
- Products: Games; Video game consoles; Mobile games; Franchises
- Revenue: ▲¥247.7 billion (2020)
- Operating income: ▲¥14.8 billion (2020)
- Number of employees: 2,922 (March 31, 2026)
- Parent: Gulf and Western (1969–1981); Paramount Pictures (1981–1984); CSK Corporation (majority stake, 1984–2004); Sega Sammy Holdings (2004–2015); Sega Group Corporation (2015–2021); Sega Sammy Holdings (2021–present)
- Divisions: Sega development studios; RGG Studio; Sonic Team
- Subsidiaries: Atlus; Sega Sapporo Studio; Creative Assembly; Hardlight; Sports Interactive; Two Point Studios; Sega Fave; Rovio Entertainment; TMS Entertainment; Marza Animation Planet; Sega Play Heart; Sega XD; Sega of America; Sega Europe; Sega Singapore; Sega (Shanghai) Entertainment Technology; Sega Publishing Korea; Sega Taiwan
- Website: sega.jp; sega.co.jp/en

Sega Corporation (Note: Japanese: 株式会社セガ, Hepburn: Kabushiki gaisha Sega; stylised as SEGA) (Note: Japanese pronunciation: [seꜜɡa], English: /ˈseɪɡə/, /ˈsɛ-/) is a Japanese video game company and subsidiary of Sega Sammy Holdings headquartered in Tokyo. It produces several multi-million-selling game franchises for arcades and consoles including Sonic the Hedgehog, Angry Birds, Football Manager, Phantasy Star, Puyo Puyo, Super Monkey Ball, Total War, Virtua Fighter, Megami Tensei, Sakura Wars, Persona, and Like a Dragon/Yakuza. From 1983 until 2001, Sega also developed its own consoles.

Sega was founded by Martin Bromley and Richard Stewart as Nihon Goraku Bussan (Note: Japanese: 日本娯楽物産株式会社, Hepburn: Nihon goraku bussan kabushiki gaisha; Japanese Amusement Products Stock Company) on June 3, 1960. Shortly after, it acquired the assets of its predecessor, Service Games of Japan. In 1965, it became known as Sega Enterprises, Ltd., after acquiring Rosen Enterprises, an importer of coin-operated games. Sega developed its first coin-operated game, Periscope, in 1966. Sega was sold to Gulf and Western Industries in 1969. Following a downturn in the arcade business in the early 1980s, Sega began to develop video game consoles, starting with the SG-1000 and Master System, but struggled against competitors such as the Nintendo Entertainment System (NES). In 1984, Sega executives David Rosen and Hayao Nakayama led a management buyout, with backing from CSK Corporation.

In 1988, Sega released the Mega Drive (the "Genesis" in North America). The Mega Drive struggled against competition in Japan, but the Genesis found success overseas after the release of Sonic the Hedgehog in 1991 and briefly outsold its main competitor, the Super Nintendo Entertainment System, in the US. In 2001, after several commercial failures such as the 32X, Saturn, and Dreamcast, Sega stopped manufacturing consoles to become a third-party developer and publisher, and was acquired by Sammy Corporation in 2004. Sega Holdings Co., Ltd. was established in 2015; Sega Corporation was renamed to Sega Games Co., Ltd., and its arcade division was split into Sega Interactive. In 2020, Sega Games and Sega Interactive merged to become Sega Corporation.

Sega's international branches, Sega of America and Sega Europe, are headquartered in Irvine, California, and London. Its development studios include its internal research and development divisions (which utilize the Ryu Ga Gotoku Studio and Sonic Team brands for several core franchise entries), Sega Sapporo Studio which mainly provides support for the Tokyo-based development teams as well as handling partial game development, and Atlus (including its R&D divisions) and five development studios in the UK and Europe: Creative Assembly, Sports Interactive, Sega Hardlight, Two Point Studios, and Rovio Entertainment (including Ruby Games). Sega is one of the world's most prolific arcade game producers and its mascot, Sonic, is internationally recognized. Sega is recognized for its video game consoles, creativity and innovations. In more recent years, it has been criticized for its business decisions and the quality of its creative output.

Being the entertainment contents division of Sega Sammy Holdings, forming one half of the Sega Sammy Group, Sega also owns a toy and amusement machine company, Sega Fave, which comprises its arcade development and manufacturing divisions and two animation studios: TMS Entertainment, which animates, produces, and distributes anime, and Marza Animation Planet, which specializes in CG animation.

== History ==
=== 1940–1982: Origins and arcade success ===
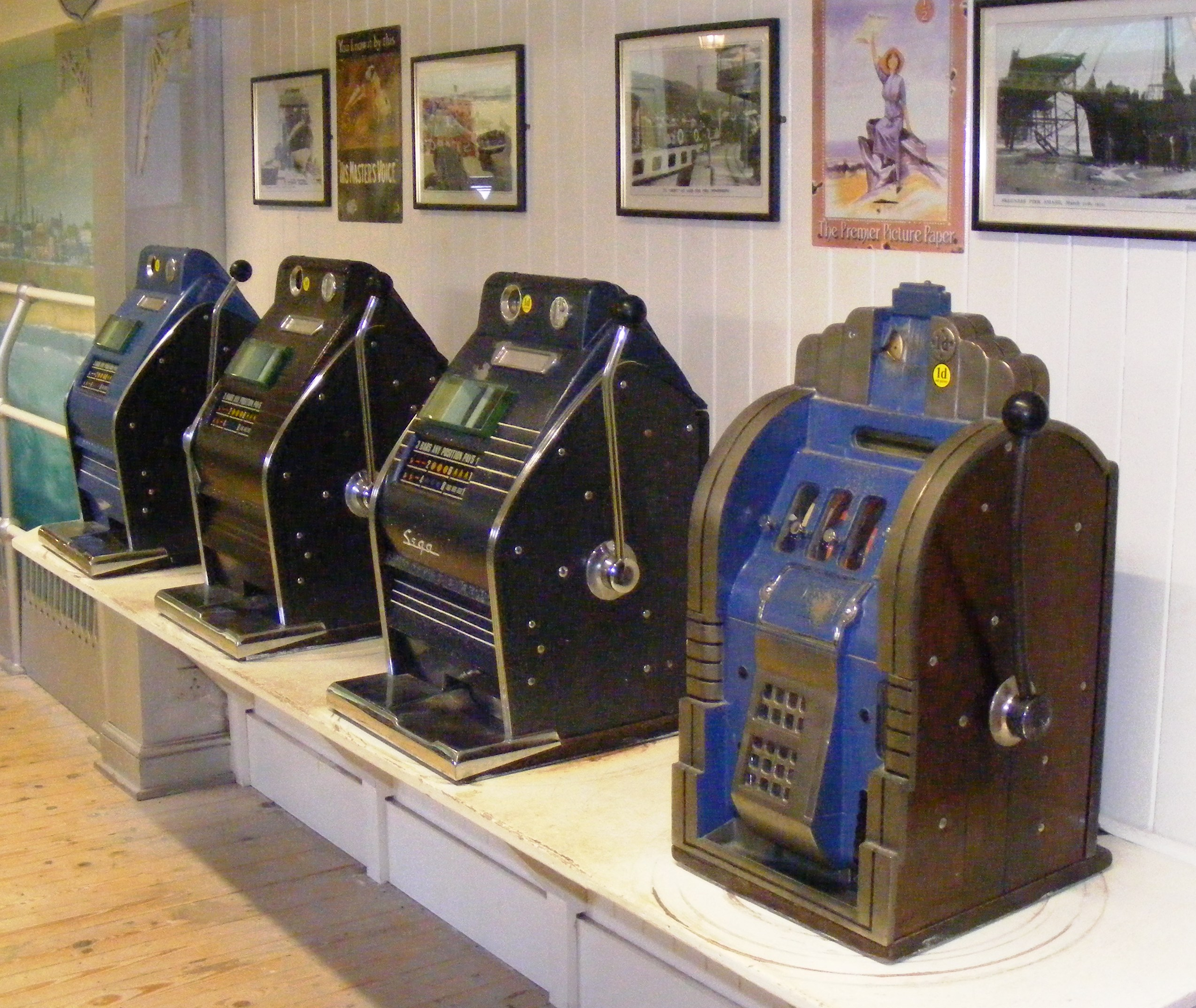
The Diamond 3 Star was a coin-operated slot machine produced by Sega in the 1950s.

In May 1940, American businessmen Martin Bromley, Irving Bromberg and James Humpert formed Standard Games in Honolulu, Hawaii. Their aim was to provide coin-operated amusement machines, including slot machines, to military bases as the increase in personnel with the onset of World War II would create demand for entertainment. After the war, the founders sold Standard Games in 1945, and established Service Games the next year, named for the military focus. After the US government outlawed slot machines in its territories in 1952, Bromley sent employees Richard Stewart and Ray LeMaire to Tokyo to establish Service Games of Japan to provide coin-operated slot machines to US bases in Japan. A year later, all five men established Service Games Panama to control the entities of Service Games worldwide. The company expanded over the next seven years to include distribution in South Korea, the Philippines, and South Vietnam. The name Sega, an abbreviation of Service Games, was first used in 1954 on a slot machine, the Diamond Star.

Due to notoriety arising from investigations by the US government into criminal business practices, Service Games of Japan was dissolved on May 31, 1960. On June 3, Bromley established two companies to take over its business activities, Nihon Goraku Bussan and Nihon Kikai Seizō. (Note: Japanese: 日本機械製造株式会社, Hepburn: Nihon kikai seizō kabushiki gaisha; Japanese Machine Manufacturers Co., Ltd.) The two new companies purchased all of Service Games of Japan's assets. Kikai Seizō, doing business as Sega, Inc., focused on manufacturing slot machines. Goraku Bussan, doing business under Stewart as Utamatic, Inc., served as a distributor and operator of coin-operated machines, particularly jukeboxes. The companies merged in 1964, retaining the Nihon Goraku Bussan name.

Around the same time, David Rosen, an American officer in the United States Air Force stationed in Japan, launched a photo booth business in Tokyo in 1954. This company became Rosen Enterprises, and in 1957 began importing coin-operated games into Japan. In 1965, Nihon Goraku Bussan acquired Rosen Enterprises to form Sega Enterprises, Ltd. (Note: Japanese: 株式会社セガ・エンタープライゼズ, Hepburn: Kabushiki gaisha Sega Entapuraizezu) Rosen was installed as the CEO and managing director, while Stewart was named president and LeMaire was the director of planning. Shortly afterward, Sega stopped leasing to military bases and moved its focus from slot machines to coin-operated amusement machines. Its imports included Rock-Ola jukeboxes, pinball games by Williams, and gun games by Midway Manufacturing.

Former logo used until 1975.

Because Sega imported second-hand machines, which required frequent maintenance, it began constructing replacement guns and flippers for its imported games. According to former Sega director Akira Nagai, this led to the company developing its own games. The first arcade electro-mechanical game (EM game) Sega manufactured was the submarine simulator Periscope, released worldwide in the late 1960s. It featured light and sound effects considered innovative and was successful in Japan. It was then exported to malls and department stores in Europe and the United States and helped standardize the 25-cent-per-play cost for arcade games in the US. Sega was surprised by the success, and for the next two years, the company produced and exported between eight and ten games per year. The worldwide success of Periscope led to a "technological renaissance" in the arcade industry, which was reinvigorated by a wave of "audio-visual" EM novelty games that followed in the wake of Periscope during the late 1960s to early 1970s. However, rampant piracy led Sega to cease exporting its games around 1970.

In 1969, Sega was sold to the American conglomerate Gulf and Western Industries, although Rosen remained CEO. In 1974, Gulf and Western made Sega Enterprises, Ltd., a subsidiary of an American company renamed Sega Enterprises, Inc. Sega released Pong-Tron, its first video-based game, in 1973. Despite late competition from Taito's hit arcade game Space Invaders in 1978, Sega prospered from the arcade video game boom of the late 1970s, with revenues climbing to over US$100 million by 1979. During this period, Sega acquired Gremlin Industries, which manufactured microprocessor-based arcade games, and Esco Boueki, a coin-op distributor founded and owned by Hayao Nakayama. Nakayama was placed in a management role of Sega's Japanese operations. In the early 1980s, Sega was one of the top five arcade game manufacturers active in the United States, as company revenues rose to $214 million. 1979 saw the release of Head On, which introduced the "eat-the-dots" gameplay Namco later used in Pac-Man. In 1981, Sega licensed Konami's Frogger, its most successful game until then. In 1982, Sega introduced the first game with isometric graphics, Zaxxon.

=== 1982–1989: Entry into the game console market, management buyout and arcade resurgence ===
Sega consoles release timeline
1983	SG-1000
1983	SC-3000
1984	SG-1000 II
1985	Sega Mark III
1986	Master System (The NA/EU version of the Sega Mark III with different design)
1987
1988	Sega Mega Drive
1989	Sega Genesis (The NA version of the Sega Mega Drive with different design)
1990	Game Gear
1991	Sega CD (Model 1)
1992
1993	Sega CD (Model 2)
1993	Sega Mega Drive II
1993	Sega Genesis II (The NA version of the Sega Mega Drive II with different design)
1993	Sega Pico
1994	Sega Mega Jet
1994	Sega Genesis CDX
1994	Sega Saturn (Model 1)
1994	32X
1995	Sega Saturn (Model 1) (Different design for NA market)
1995	Sega Genesis Nomad
1996	Sega Saturn (Model 2)
1996	Sega Saturn (Model 2) (Different design for NA market)
1997
1998	Dreamcast
1999–2018
2019	Sega Genesis Mini
2020–2021
2022	Sega Genesis Mini 2

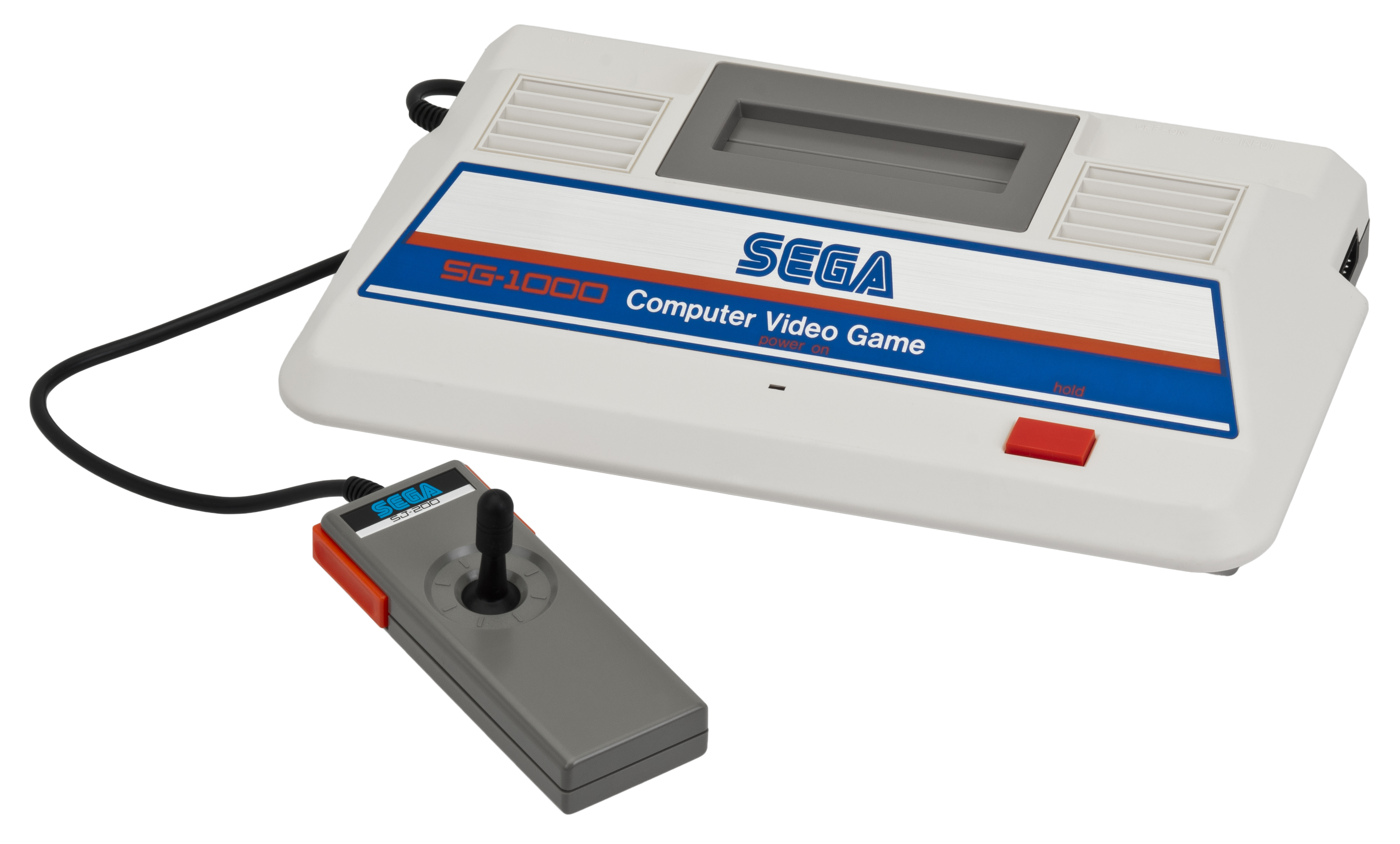
Sega's first video game console, the SG-1000

Following a downturn in the arcade business starting in 1982, Gulf and Western sold its North American arcade game manufacturing organization and the licensing rights for its arcade games to Bally Manufacturing in September 1983. Gulf and Western retained Sega's North American R&D operation and its Japanese subsidiary, Sega Enterprises, Ltd. With its arcade business in decline, Sega Enterprises, Ltd. president Nakayama advocated for the company to use its hardware expertise to move into the home consumer market in Japan. This led to Sega's development of a computer, the SC-3000. Learning that Nintendo was developing a games-only console, the Famicom, Sega developed its first home video game system, the SG-1000, alongside the SC-3000. Rebranded versions of the SG-1000 were released in several other markets worldwide. The SG-1000 sold 160,000 units in 1983, which far exceeded Sega's projection of 50,000 in the first year but was outpaced by the Famicom. This was in part because Nintendo expanded its game library by courting third-party developers, whereas Sega was hesitant to collaborate with companies with which it was competing in the arcades.

In November 1983, Rosen announced his intention to step down as president of Sega Enterprises, Inc. on January 1, 1984. Jeffrey Rochlis was announced as the new president and CEO of Sega. Shortly after the launch of the SG-1000, and the death of company founder Charles Bluhdorn, Gulf and Western began to sell off its secondary businesses. Nakayama and Rosen arranged a management buyout of the Japanese subsidiary in 1984 with financial backing from Computer Service, a prominent Japanese software company. Sega's Japanese assets were purchased for $38 million by a group of investors led by Rosen and Nakayama. Isao Okawa, head of CSK, became chairman, while Nakayama was installed as CEO of Sega Enterprises, Ltd.

In 1985, Sega began working on the Mark III, a redesigned SG-1000. For North America, Sega rebranded the Mark III as the Master System, with a futuristic design intended to appeal to Western tastes. The Mark III was released in Japan in October 1985. Despite featuring more powerful hardware than the Famicom in some ways, it was unsuccessful at launch. As Nintendo required third-party developers not to publish their Famicom games on other consoles, Sega developed its own games and obtained the rights to port games from other developers. To help market the console in North America, Sega planned to sell the Master System as a toy, similar to how Nintendo had done with the Nintendo Entertainment System. Sega partnered with Tonka, an American toy company, to make use of Tonka's expertise in the toy industry. Ineffective marketing by Tonka handicapped sales of the Master System. By early 1992, production had ceased in North America. The Master System sold between 1.5 million and 2 million units in the region. This was less market share in North America than both Nintendo and Atari, which controlled 80 percent and 12 percent of the market. The Master System was eventually a success in Europe, where its sales were comparable to the NES. As late as 1993, the Master System's active installed user base in Europe was 6.25 million units. The Master System has had continued success in Brazil. New versions continue to be released by Sega's partner in the region, Tectoy. By 2016, the Master System had sold 8 million units in Brazil.

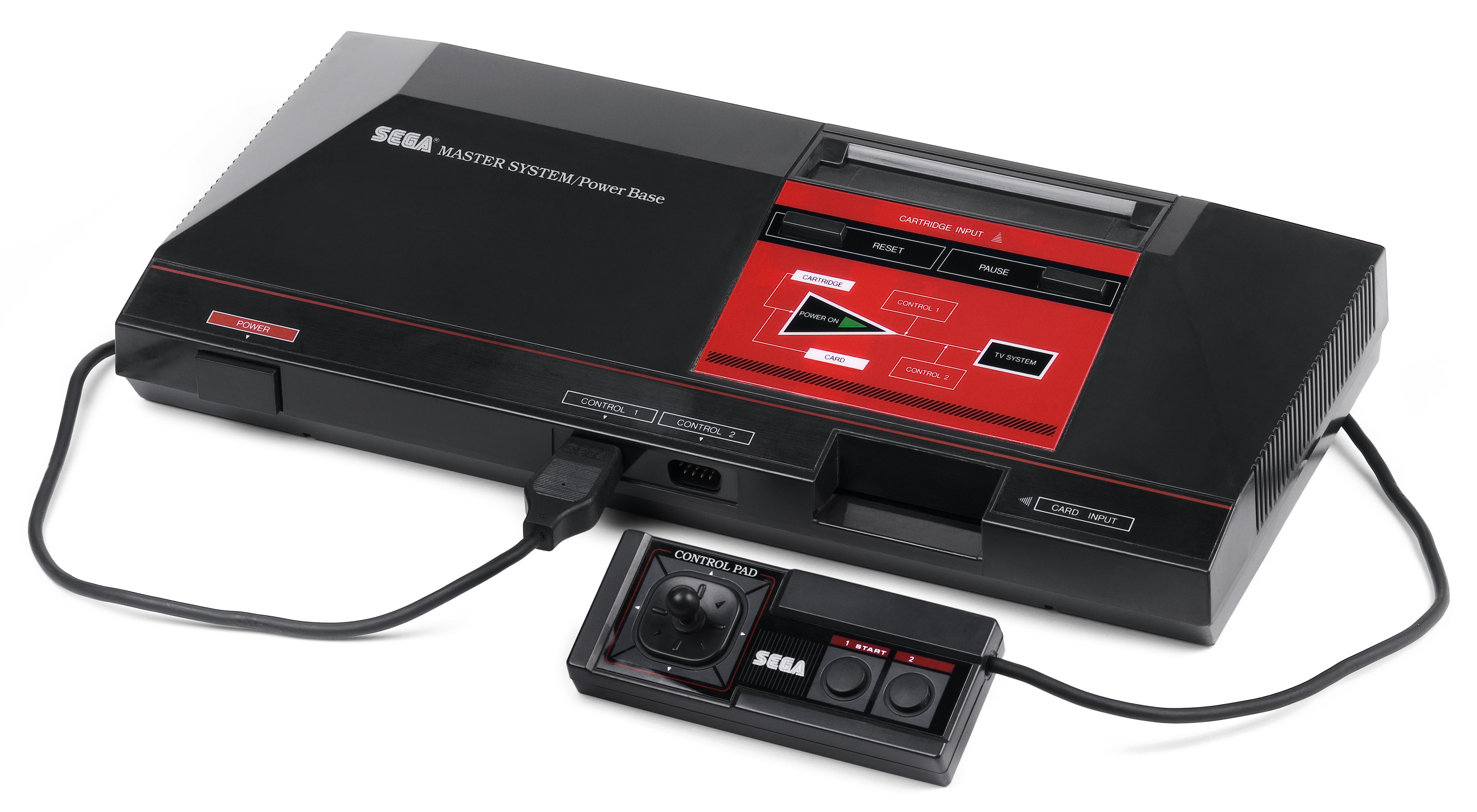
The Master System, released in North America in 1986 and Europe in 1987

During 1984, Sega opened its European division of arcade distribution, Sega Europe. It re-entered the North American arcade market in 1985 with the establishment of Sega Enterprises USA at the end of a deal with Bally. The release of Hang-On in 1985 would prove successful in the region, becoming so popular that Sega struggled to keep up with demand for the game. UFO Catcher was introduced in 1985 and as of 2005 was Japan's most commonly installed claw machine. In 1986, Sega of America was established to manage the company's consumer products in North America, beginning with marketing the Master System. During Sega's partnership with Tonka, Sega of America relinquished marketing and distribution of the console and focused on customer support and some localization of games. Out Run, released in 1986, became Sega's best selling arcade cabinet of the 1980s. Former Sega director Akira Nagai said Hang-On and Out Run helped to pull the arcade game market out of the 1982 downturn and created new genres of video games.

=== 1989–1994: Genesis, Sonic the Hedgehog, and mainstream success ===
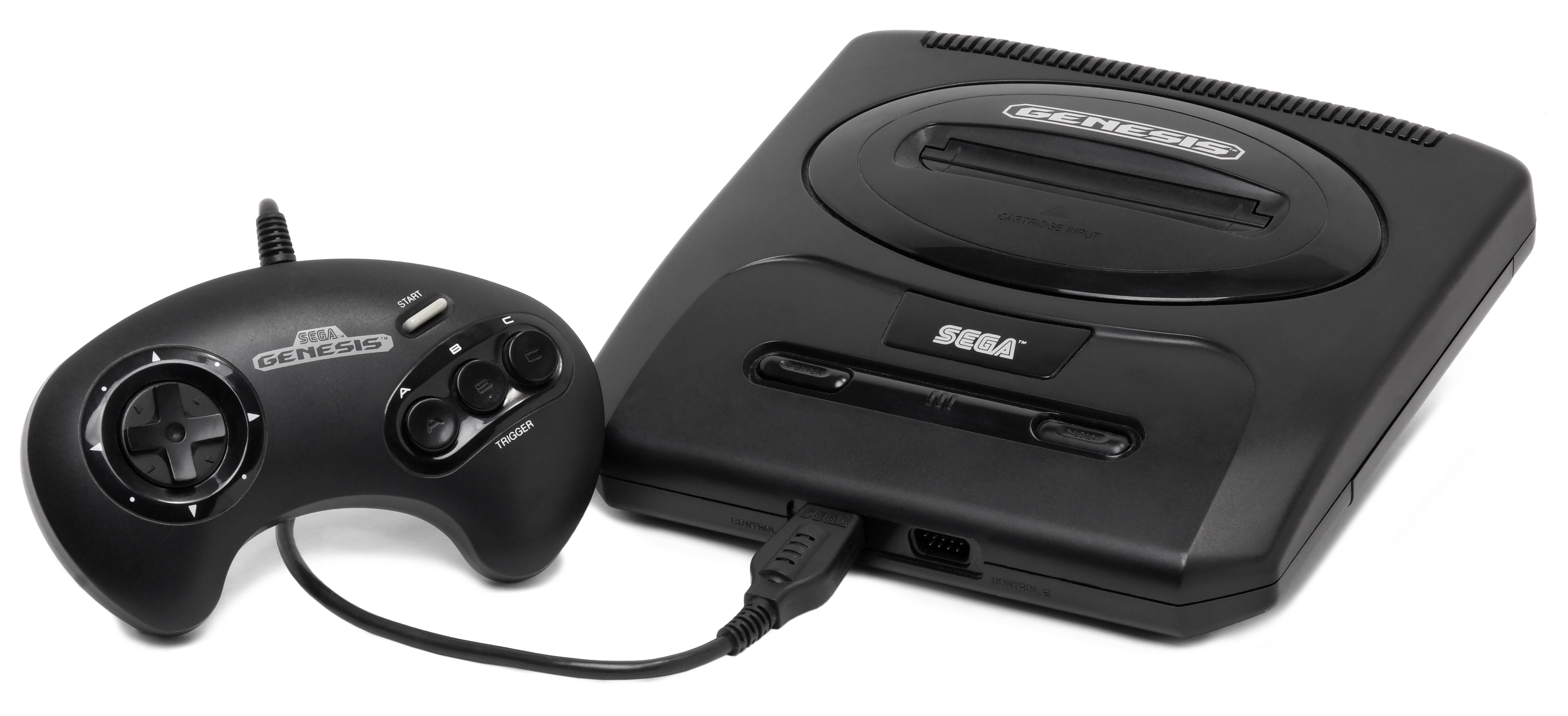
The Sega Genesis (second North American version pictured), Sega's successor to the Master System, took control of the 16-bit console market in much of the world during the fourth generation of video game consoles.

With the arcade game market once again growing, Sega was one of the most recognized game brands at the end of the 1980s. In the arcades, the company focused on releasing games to appeal to diverse tastes, including racing games and side-scrollers. Sega released the Master System's successor, the Mega Drive, in Japan on October 29, 1988. The launch was overshadowed by Nintendo's release of Super Mario Bros. 3 a week earlier. Positive coverage from magazines Famitsu and Beep! helped establish a following, with the latter launching a new publication dedicated to the console, but Sega shipped only 400,000 units in the first year.

The Mega Drive struggled to compete against the Famicom and lagged behind Nintendo's Super Famicom and the TurboGrafx-16, made by NEC, in Japanese sales throughout the 16-bit era. For the North American launch, where the console was renamed Genesis, Sega had no sales and marketing organization. After Atari declined an offer to market the console in the region, Sega launched it through its own Sega of America subsidiary. The Genesis was launched in New York City and Los Angeles on August 14, 1989, and in the rest of North America later that year. The European version of the Mega Drive was released in September 1990.

Former Atari executive and new Sega of America president Michael Katz developed a two-part strategy to build sales in North America. The first part involved a marketing campaign to challenge Nintendo and emphasize the more arcade-like experience available on the Genesis, with slogans including "Genesis does what Nintendon't". Since Nintendo owned the console rights to most arcade games of the time, the second part involved creating a library of games which used the names and likenesses of celebrities, such as Michael Jackson's Moonwalker and Joe Montana Football. Nonetheless, Sega had difficulty overcoming Nintendo's ubiquity in homes. Sega of America sold only 500,000 Genesis units in its first year, half of Nakayama's goal.

Sonic the Hedgehog has been Sega's mascot since 1991.

After the launch of the Genesis, Sega sought a new flagship line of releases to compete with Nintendo's Mario series. Its new character, Sonic the Hedgehog, went on to feature in one of the best-selling video game franchises in history. Sonic the Hedgehog began with a tech demo created by Yuji Naka involving a fast-moving character rolling in a ball through a winding tube; this was fleshed out with Naoto Ohshima's character design and levels conceived by designer Hirokazu Yasuhara. Sonic's color was chosen to match Sega's cobalt blue logo; his shoes were inspired by Michael Jackson's boots, and his personality by Bill Clinton's "can-do" attitude.

Nakayama hired Tom Kalinske as CEO of Sega of America in mid-1990, and Katz departed soon after. Kalinske knew little about the video game market, but surrounded himself with industry-savvy advisors. A believer in the razor-and-blades business model, he developed a four-point plan: cut the price of the Genesis, create a US team to develop games targeted at the American market, expand the aggressive advertising campaigns, and replace the bundled game Altered Beast with Sonic the Hedgehog. The Japanese board of directors disapproved, but it was approved by Nakayama, who told Kalinske, "I hired you to make the decisions for Europe and the Americas, so go ahead and do it."

In large part due to the popularity of Sonic the Hedgehog, the Genesis outsold its main competitor, the Super Nintendo Entertainment System (SNES), in the United States nearly two to one during the 1991 holiday season. By January 1992, Sega controlled 65 percent of the 16-bit console market. Sega outsold Nintendo for four consecutive Christmas seasons due to the Genesis' head start, lower price, and a larger library compared to the SNES at release. Nintendo's dollar share of the US 16-bit market dropped from 60% at the end of 1992 to 37% at the end of 1993, Sega claimed 55% of all 16-bit hardware sales during 1994, and the SNES outsold the Genesis from 1995 through 1997.

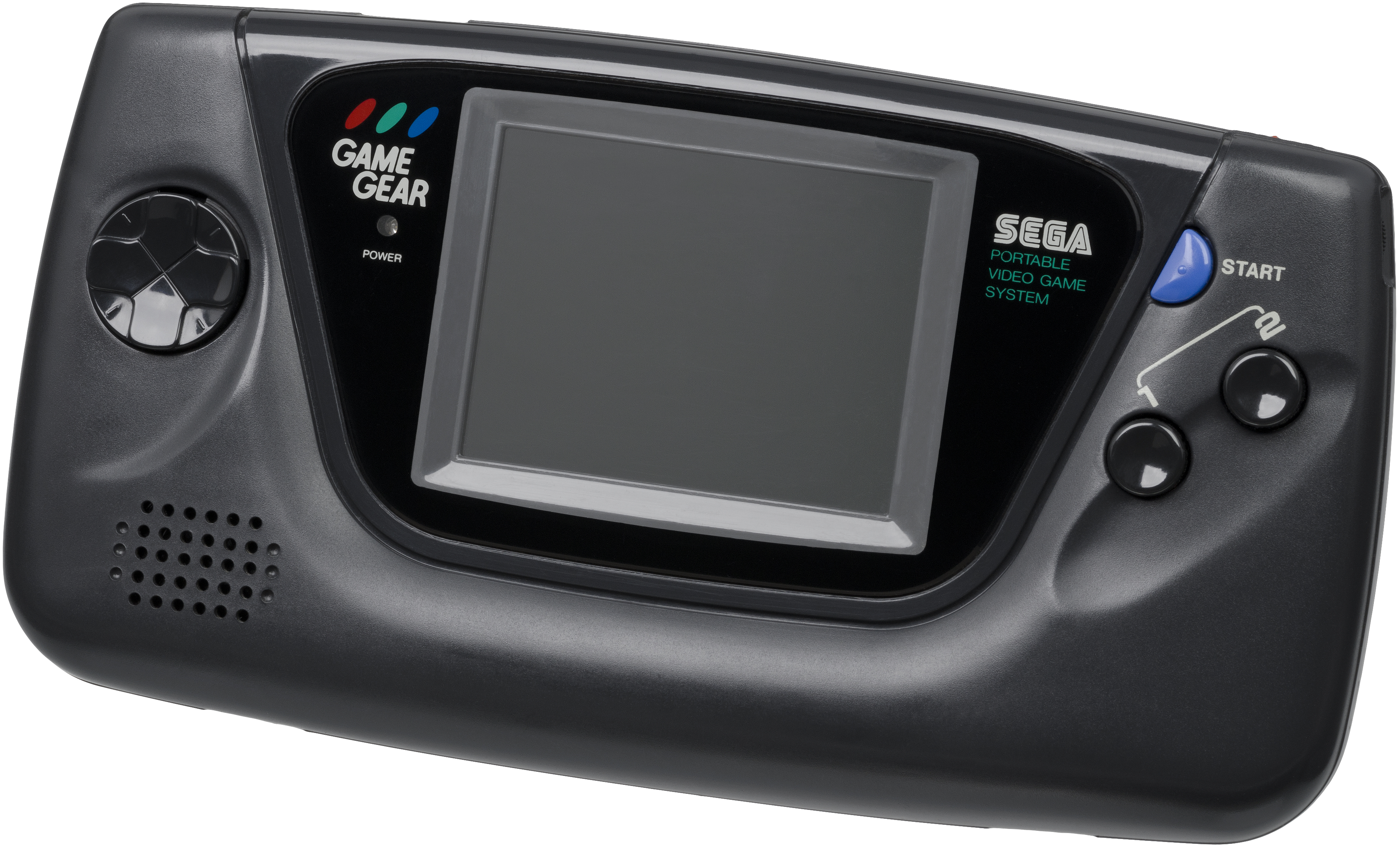
Game Gear, released in 1990

In 1990, Sega launched the Game Gear, a handheld console, to compete against Nintendo's Game Boy. The Game Gear was designed as a portable version of the Master System and featured a full-color screen, in contrast to the monochrome Game Boy screen. Due to its short battery life, lack of original games, and weak support from Sega, the Game Gear did not surpass the Game Boy, having sold approximately 11 million units. Sega launched the Mega-CD in Japan on December 1, 1991, initially retailing at JP¥49,800. The add-on uses CD-ROM technology. Further features include a second, faster processor, vastly expanded system memory, a graphics chip that performed scaling and rotation similar to the company's arcade games, and another sound chip. In North America, it was renamed the Sega CD and launched on October 15, 1992, with a retail price of US$299. It was released in Europe as the Mega-CD in 1993. The Mega-CD sold only 100,000 units during its first year in Japan, falling well below expectations.

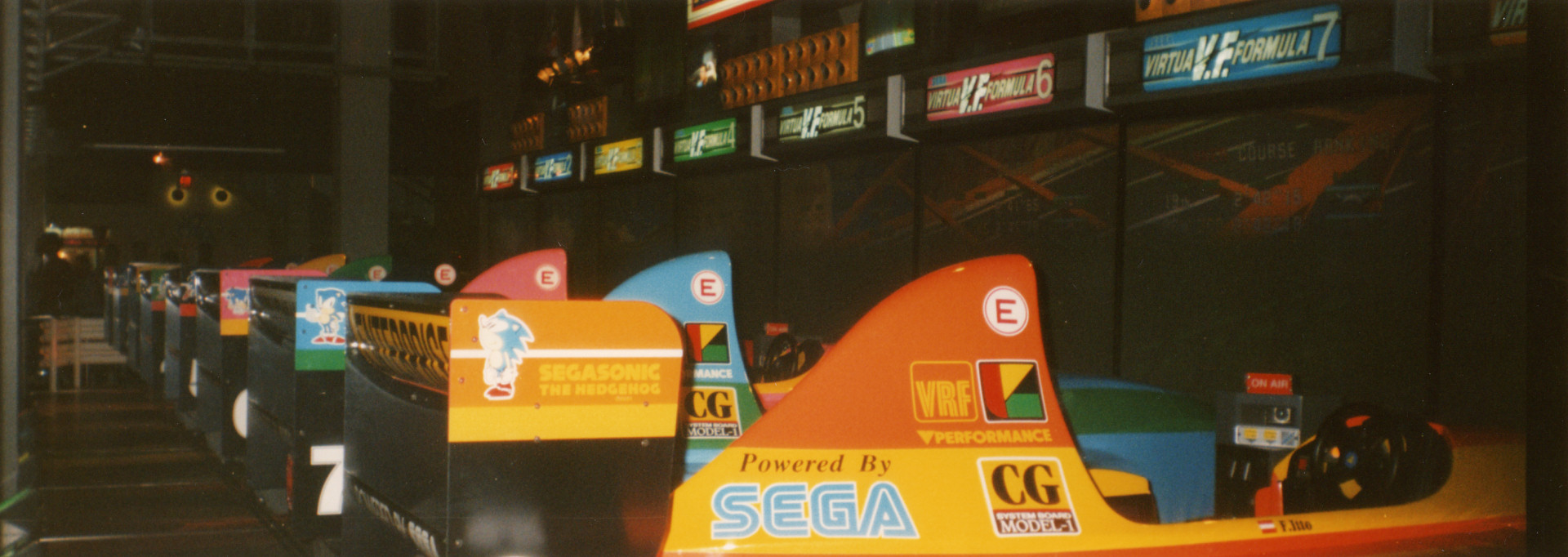
Larger Virtua Formula installation of Virtua Racing at the Sega VirtuaLand arcade in Luxor Las Vegas, circa late 1993

Throughout the early 1990s, Sega largely continued its success in arcades around the world. In 1992 and 1993, the new Sega Model 1 arcade system board showcased in-house development studio Sega AM2's Virtua Racing and Virtua Fighter (the first 3D fighting game), which, though expensive, played a crucial role in popularizing 3D polygonal graphics. (Note: Attributed to multiple references:) In addition, complex simulator equipment like the rotational R360 kept Sega competing with machines by rival arcade companies, including Taito. New official region-specific distributors and manufacturers, including the UK's Deith Leisure, allowed Sega to sell its machines outside of Japan with ease. Sega's domestic operations division also opened hundreds of family-oriented suburban Sega World amusement arcades in Japan during this period, as well as large over-18s "GiGO" facilities in the high-profile urban areas of Roppongi and Ikebukuro. In 1993, this success was mirrored in overseas territories with the openings of several large branded entertainment centers, such as Sega VirtuaLand in Luxor Las Vegas. In 1994, Sega generated a revenue of ¥354.032 billion or $3,464,000,000 (equivalent to $7,525,000,000 in 2025).

In 1993, the American media began to focus on the mature content of certain video games, such as Night Trap for the Sega CD and the Genesis version of Midway's Mortal Kombat. This came at a time when Sega was capitalizing on its image as an "edgy" company with "attitude", and this reinforced that image. To handle this, Sega instituted the United States' first video game ratings system, the Videogame Rating Council (VRC), for all its systems. Ratings ranged from the family-friendly GA rating to the more mature rating of MA-13, and the adults-only rating of MA-17. Executive vice president of Nintendo of America Howard Lincoln was quick to point out in the United States congressional hearings in 1993 that Night Trap was not rated at all. Senator Joe Lieberman called for another hearing in February 1994 to check progress toward a rating system for video game violence. After the hearings, Sega proposed the universal adoption of the VRC; after objections by Nintendo and others, Sega took a role in forming the Entertainment Software Rating Board.

=== 1994–1998: 32X, Saturn, falling console sales, and continued arcade success ===
Sega began work on the Genesis' successor, the Sega Saturn, more than two years before showcasing it at the Tokyo Toy Show in June 1994. According to former Sega of America producer Scot Bayless, Nakayama became concerned about the 1994 release of the Atari Jaguar, and that the Saturn would not be available until the next year. As a result, Nakayama decided to have a second console release to market by the end of 1994. Sega began to develop the 32X, a Genesis add-on which would serve as a less expensive entry into the 32-bit era. The 32X would not be compatible with the Saturn, but would play Genesis games. Sega released the 32X on November 21, 1994, in North America, December 3, 1994, in Japan, and January 1995 in PAL territories, and was sold at less than half of the Saturn's launch price. After the holiday season, interest in the 32X rapidly declined.

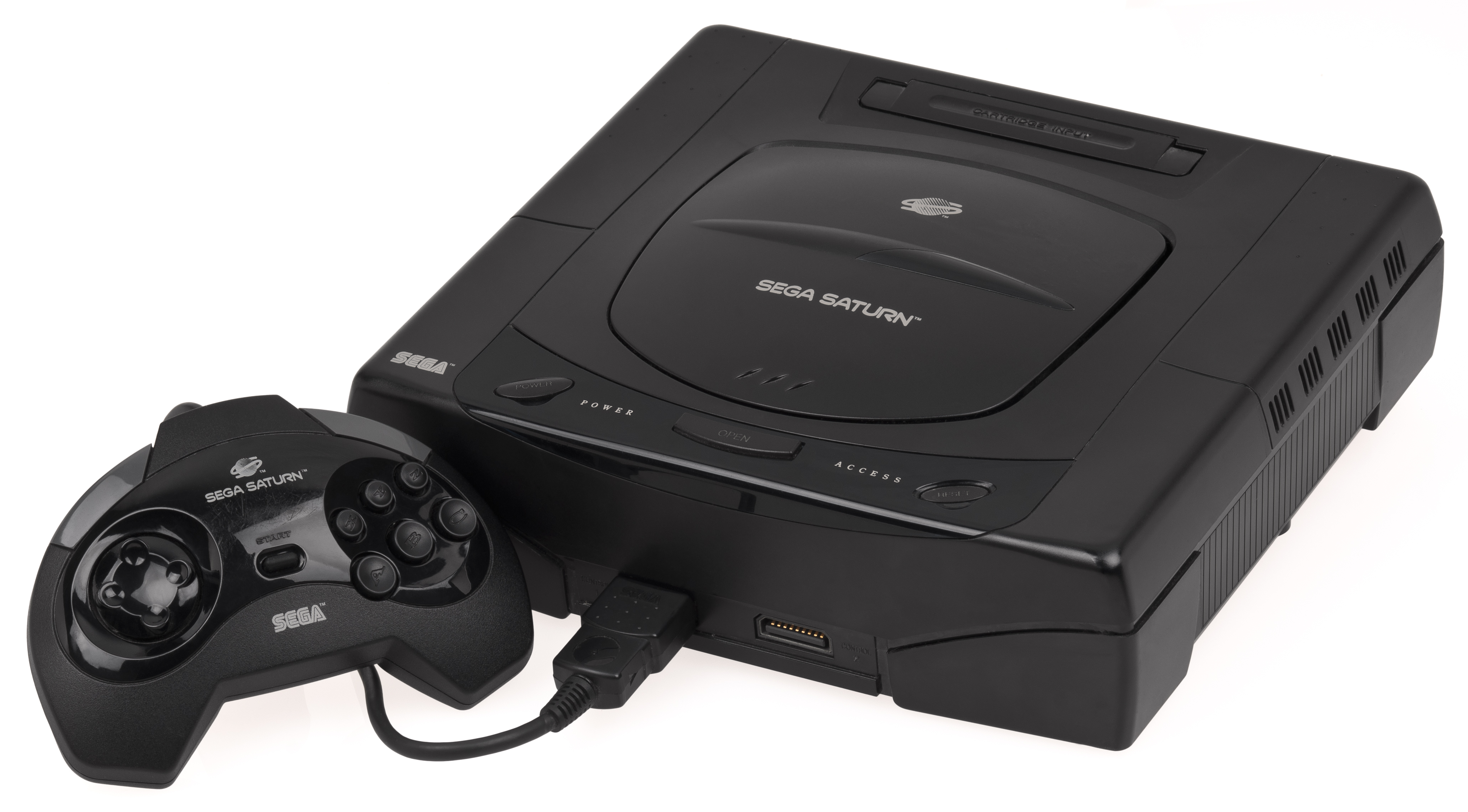
The Sega Saturn failed to repeat the western success of the Genesis.

Sega released the Saturn in Japan on November 22, 1994. Virtua Fighter, a port of the popular arcade game, sold at a nearly one-to-one ratio with the Saturn at launch and was crucial to the system's early success in Japan. Sega's initial shipment of 200,000 Saturn units sold out on the first day, and it was more popular than the PlayStation, made by Sony, in Japan. In March 1995, Sega of America CEO Tom Kalinske announced that the Saturn would be released in the US on Saturday, September 2, 1995, advertised as "Saturn-day". Sega executives in Japan mandated an early launch to give the Saturn an advantage over the PlayStation. At the first Electronic Entertainment Expo (E3) in Los Angeles on May 11, 1995, Kalinske revealed the release price and that Sega had shipped 30,000 Saturns to Toys "R" Us, Babbage's, Electronics Boutique, and Software Etc. for immediate release. A by-product of the surprise launch was the provocation of retailers not included in Sega's rollout; KB Toys in particular decided to no longer stock its products in response.

The Saturn's release in Europe also came before the previously announced North American date, on July 8, 1995. Within two days of the PlayStation's American launch on September 9, 1995, the PlayStation sold more units than the Saturn. Within its first year, the PlayStation secured over twenty percent of the US video game market. The console's high price point, surprise launch, and difficulty handling polygonal graphics were factors in its lack of success. Sega also underestimated the continued popularity of the Genesis; 16-bit sales accounted for 64 percent of the market in 1995. Despite capturing 43 percent of the US market dollar share and selling more than 2 million Genesis units in 1995, Kalinske estimated that, if prepared for demand, another 300,000 could have been sold.

Sega announced that Shoichiro Irimajiri had been appointed chairman and CEO of Sega of America in July 1996, while Kalinske left Sega after September 30 of that year. A former Honda executive, Irimajiri had been involved with Sega of America since joining Sega in 1993. The company also announced that Rosen and Nakayama had resigned from their positions at Sega of America, though both remained with Sega. Bernie Stolar, a former executive at Sony Computer Entertainment of America, became Sega of America's executive vice president in charge of product development and third-party relations. Stolar was not supportive of the Saturn, believing its hardware was poorly designed.

While Stolar had said "the Saturn is not our future" at E3 1997, he continued to emphasize the quality of its games, and later reflected that "we tried to wind it down as cleanly as we could for the consumer." At Sony, Stolar had opposed the localization of certain Japanese PlayStation games that he felt would not represent the system well in North America. He advocated a similar policy for the Saturn, generally blocking 2D arcade games and role-playing games from release, although he later sought to distance himself from this stance. Other changes included a softer image in Sega's advertising, including removing the "Sega!" scream, and holding press events for the education industry.

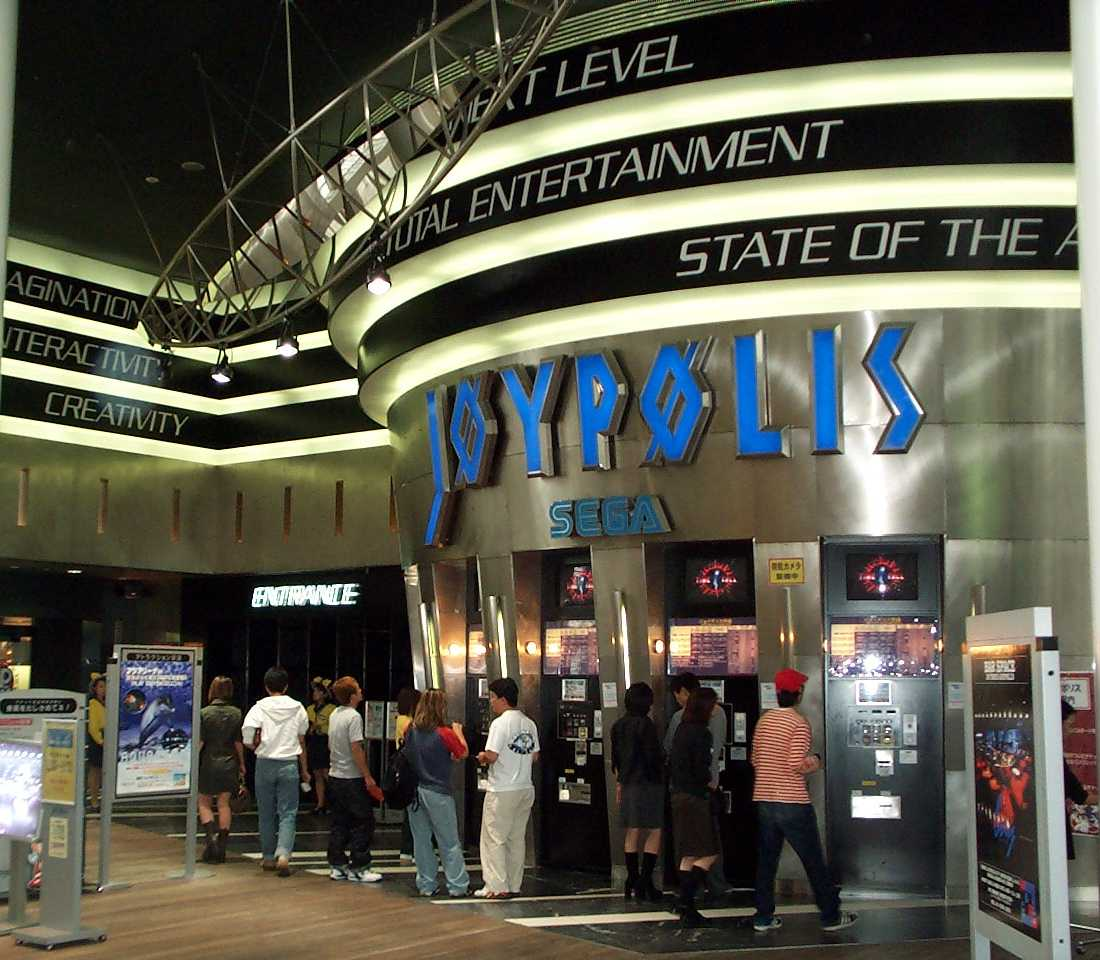
Tokyo Joypolis, the flagship Sega indoor theme park, in 1999

Sega partnered with GE to develop the Sega Model 2 arcade system board, building on 3D technology in the arcade industry at the time. This led to several successful arcade games, including Daytona USA, launched in a limited capacity in late 1993 and worldwide in 1994. Other popular games included Virtua Cop, Sega Rally Championship, and Virtua Fighter 2. Virtua Fighter and Virtua Fighter 2 became Sega's best-selling arcade games of all time, surpassing Out Run. There was also a technological arms race between Sega and Namco during this period, driving the growth of 3D gaming.

Beginning in 1994, Sega launched a series of indoor theme parks in Japan under a concept dubbed "Amusement Theme Park", including Joypolis parks sited in Tokyo locations such as Yokohama and Odaiba. A rapid overseas rollout was planned, with at least 100 locations across the world proposed to open by 2000. Only two opened: Sega World London in September 1996 and Sega World Sydney in March 1997. Following problems setting up theme parks in the United States, Sega established the GameWorks chain of entertainment centers in a joint venture with DreamWorks SKG and Universal Studios in March 1997.

In 1995, Sega partnered with Atlus to launch Print Club (purikura), an arcade photo sticker machine that produces selfie photos. Atlus and Sega introduced Purikura in February 1995, initially at game arcades, before expanding to other popular culture locations such as fast food shops, train stations, karaoke establishments and bowling alleys. Purikura became a popular form of entertainment among youths across East Asia, laying the foundations for modern selfie culture. By 1997, about 47,000 Purikura machines had been sold, earning Sega an estimated ¥25 billion (£173 million) or $283,000,000 (equivalent to $568,000,000 in 2025) from Purikura sales that year. Various other similar Purikura machines appeared from other manufacturers, with Sega controlling about half of the market in 1997.

Sega also made forays in the PC market with the 1995 establishment of SegaSoft, which was tasked with creating original Saturn and PC games. From 1994 to September 1999, Sega also participated in the arcade pinball market when it took over Data East's pinball division, renaming it Sega Pinball.

In January 1997, Sega announced its intentions to merge with the Japanese toy maker Bandai. The merger, planned as a $1 billion stock swap whereby Sega would wholly acquire Bandai, was set to form a company known as Sega Bandai, Ltd. Though it was to be finalized in October of that year, it was called off in May after growing opposition from Bandai's mid-level executives. Bandai instead agreed to a business alliance with Sega. As a result of Sega's deteriorating financial situation, Nakayama resigned as Sega president in January 1998 in favor of Irimajiri. Nakayama's resignation may have in part been due to the failure of the merger, as well as Sega's 1997 performance. Stolar became CEO and president of Sega of America.

After the launch of the Nintendo 64 in the US during 1996, sales of the Saturn and its games fell sharply in much of the west. The PlayStation outsold the Saturn three-to-one in the US in 1997, and the latter failed to gain a foothold in Europe and Australia, where the Nintendo 64 would not release until March 1997. After several years of declining profits, Sega had a slight increase in the fiscal year ended March 1997, partly driven by increasing arcade revenue, while outperforming Nintendo during the mid-term period. However, in the fiscal year ending March 1998, Sega suffered its first financial loss since its 1988 listing on the Tokyo Stock Exchange as both a parent company and a corporation as a whole. In the company's 1998 year end report, Irimajiri placed the blame for these losses on the failure to transition from the Genesis to the Saturn in North America and Sega Enterprises covering the debts of Sega of America. Shortly before the announcement of the losses, Sega discontinued the Saturn in North America to prepare for the launch of its successor, the Dreamcast, releasing remaining games in low quantities.

The decision to discontinue the Saturn effectively left the North American home console market without Sega games for over a year, with most of its activity in the country coming from arcade divisions. The Saturn lasted longer in some Europe territories and particularly Japan, with it notably outperforming the Nintendo 64 in the latter. Nonetheless, Irimajiri confirmed in an interview with Japanese newspaper Daily Yomiuri that Saturn development would stop at the end of 1998 and games would continue to be produced until mid-1999. With lifetime sales of 9.26 million units, the Saturn is retrospectively considered a commercial failure in much of the world. While Sega had success with the Model 3 arcade board and titles like Virtua Fighter 3, Sega's arcade divisions struggled in the West during the late 1990s. On the other hand, Sega's arcade divisions were more successful in Asia, with Sega's overall arcade revenues increasing year-on-year throughout the late 1990s, but it was not enough to offset the significant declining revenues of Sega's home consumer divisions.

=== 1998–2001: Dreamcast and continuing struggles ===
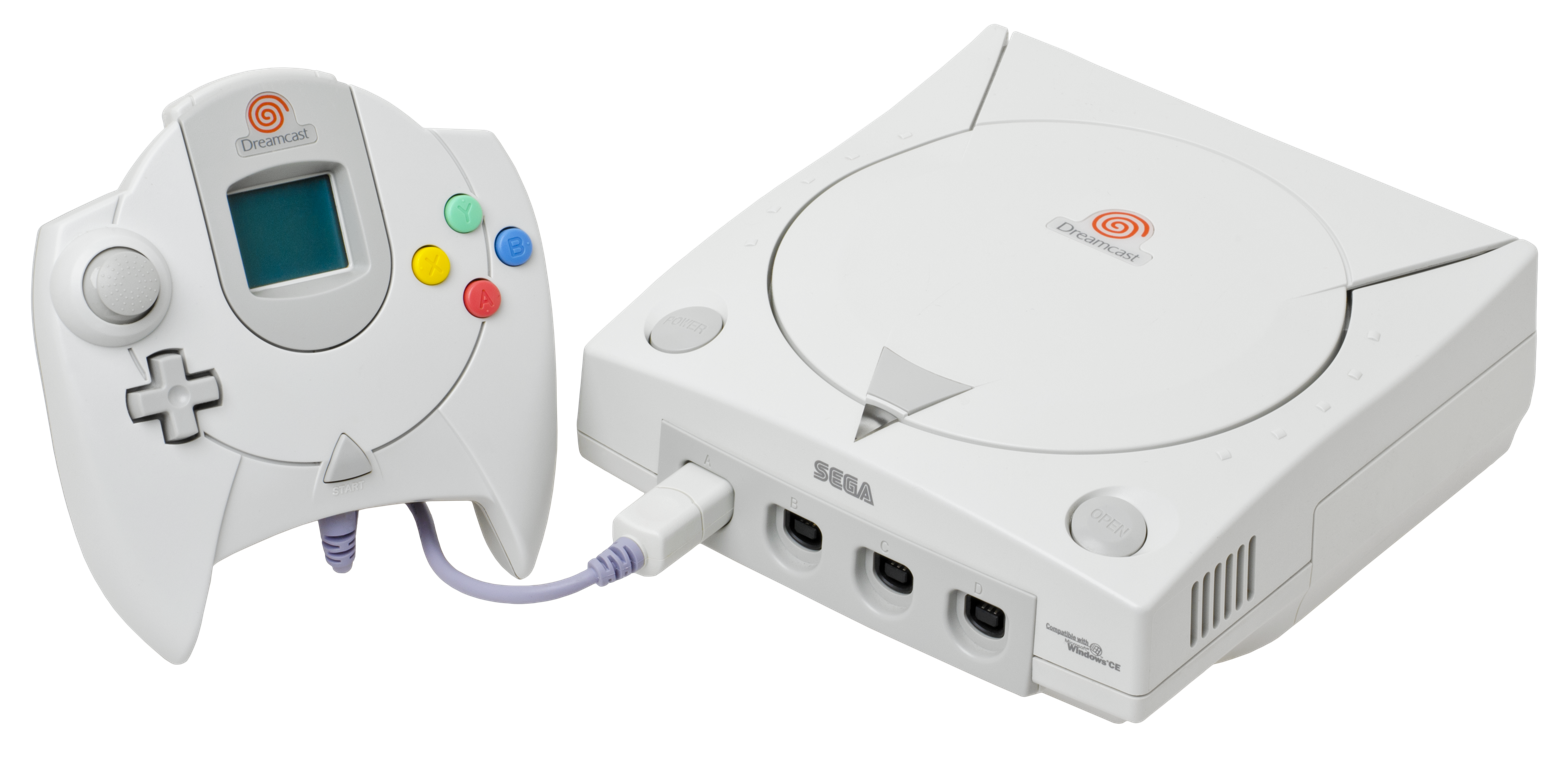
The Dreamcast, discontinued in 2001, was Sega's last video game console.

Despite a 75 percent drop in half-year profits just before the Japanese launch of the Dreamcast, Sega felt confident about its new system. The Dreamcast attracted significant interest and drew many pre-orders. Sega announced that Sonic Adventure, the first major 3D Sonic the Hedgehog game, would be a Dreamcast launch game. It was promoted with a large-scale public demonstration at the Tokyo Kokusai Forum Hall. Due to a high failure rate in the manufacturing process, Sega could not ship enough consoles for the Dreamcast's Japanese launch. As more than half of its limited stock had been pre-ordered, Sega stopped pre-orders in Japan. Before the launch, Sega announced the release of its New Arcade Operation Machine Idea (NAOMI) arcade system board, which served as a cheaper alternative to the Sega Model 3. NAOMI shared technology with the Dreamcast, allowing nearly identical ports of arcade games.

The Dreamcast launched in Japan on November 27, 1998. The entire stock of 150,000 consoles sold out by the end of the day. Irimajiri estimated that another 200,000 to 300,000 Dreamcast units could have been sold with sufficient supply. He hoped to sell more than a million Dreamcast units in Japan by February 1999, but less than 900,000 were sold. The low sales undermined Sega's attempts to build up a sufficient installed base to ensure the Dreamcast's survival after the arrival of competition from other manufacturers. Sega suffered a further ¥42.881 billion consolidated net loss in the fiscal year ending March 1999, and announced plans to eliminate 1,000 jobs, nearly a quarter of its workforce. Before the Western launch, Sega reduced the price of the Dreamcast in Japan by JP¥9,100, effectively making it unprofitable but increasing sales.

On August 11, 1999, Sega of America confirmed that Stolar had been fired. Peter Moore, whom Stolar had hired as a Sega of America executive only six months before, was placed in charge of the North American launch. (Note: Attributed to multiple references:) The Dreamcast launched in North America on September 9, 1999, with 18 games. Sega set a record by selling more than 225,132 Dreamcast units in 24 hours, earning $98.4 million in what Moore called "the biggest 24 hours in entertainment retail history". Within two weeks, US Dreamcast sales exceeded 500,000. By Christmas, Sega held 31 percent of the US video game market by revenue. On November 4, Sega announced it had sold more than a million Dreamcast units. Nevertheless, the launch was marred by a glitch at one of Sega's manufacturing plants, which produced defective GD-ROMs where data was not properly recorded onto the disc. Sega released the Dreamcast in Europe on October 14, 1999. While Sega sold 500,000 units in Europe by Christmas 1999, sales there slowed, and by October 2000 Sega had sold only about a million units. Shenmue became the most expensive game ever developed at the time, reported to have cost Sega $70 million. In 2011, Suzuki said the figure was closer to $47 million including marketing. Development also covered some of Shenmue II (2001), which was completed for a smaller amount, and groundwork for future Shenmue games.

Though the Dreamcast was successful, Sony's PlayStation still held 60 percent of the overall market share in North America at the end of 1999. On March 2, 1999, in what one report called a "highly publicized, vaporware-like announcement", Sony revealed the first details of the PlayStation 2. The same year, Nintendo announced that its next console would meet or exceed anything on the market, and Microsoft began development of its own console, the Xbox. Sega's initial momentum proved fleeting as US Dreamcast sales—which exceeded 1.5 million by the end of 1999—began to decline as early as January 2000. Poor Japanese sales contributed to Sega's ¥42.88 billion ($404 million) consolidated net loss in the fiscal year ending March 2000. This followed a similar loss of ¥42.881 billion the previous year and marked Sega's third consecutive annual loss. Sega's overall sales for the term increased 27.4 percent, and Dreamcast sales in North America and Europe greatly exceeded its expectations. However, this coincided with a decrease in profitability due to the investments required to launch the Dreamcast in Western markets and poor software sales in Japan. At the same time, worsening conditions reduced the profitability of Sega's Japanese arcade business, prompting the closure of 246 locations.

Moore became the president and chief operating officer of Sega of America on May 8, 2000. He said the Dreamcast would need to sell 5 million units in the US by the end of 2000 to remain viable, but Sega fell short of this goal with some 3 million units sold. Moreover, Sega's attempts to spur Dreamcast sales through lower prices and cash rebates caused escalating financial losses. In March 2001, Sega posted a consolidated net loss of ¥51.7 billion ($417.5 million). While the PlayStation 2's October 26 US launch was marred by shortages, this did not benefit the Dreamcast as much as expected, as many disappointed consumers continued to wait or purchased a PSone. Eventually, Sony and Nintendo held 50 and 35 percent of the US video game market, while Sega held only 15 percent.

=== 2001–2003: Shift to third-party software development ===

CSK chairman Isao Okawa replaced Irimajiri as president of Sega on May 22, 2000. Okawa had long advocated that Sega abandon the console business. Others shared this view; Sega co-founder David Rosen had "always felt it was a bit of a folly for them to be limiting their potential to Sega hardware", and Stolar had suggested Sega should have sold the company to Microsoft. In a September 2000 meeting with Sega's Japanese executives and heads of its first-party game studios, Moore and Sega of America executive Charles Bellfield recommended that Sega abandon its console business. In response, the studio heads walked out. Sega announced an official company name change from Sega Enterprises, Ltd. to Sega Corporation effective November 1, 2000, officially dropping the Sega Enterprises name used in Japan as well as transitioning to the Sega name used globally. Sega stated in a release that this was to display its commitment to its "network entertainment business".

On January 23, 2001, Japanese newspaper Nihon Keizai Shinbun reported that Sega would cease production of the Dreamcast and develop software for other platforms. After an initial denial, Sega released a press release confirming it was considering producing software for the PlayStation 2 and Game Boy Advance as part of its "new management policy". On January 31, 2001, Sega announced the discontinuation of the Dreamcast after March 31 and the restructuring of the company as a "platform-agnostic" third-party developer. Sega also announced a Dreamcast price reduction to eliminate its unsold inventory, estimated at 930,000 units as of April 2001. This was followed by further reductions to clear the remaining inventory. The final manufactured Dreamcast was autographed by the heads of all nine of Sega's first-party game studios, plus the heads of sports game developer Visual Concepts and audio studio Wave Master, and given away with all 55 first-party Dreamcast games through a competition organized by GamePro.

Okawa, who had loaned Sega $500 million in 1999, died on March 16, 2001. Shortly before his death, he forgave Sega's debts to him and returned his $695 million worth of Sega and CSK stock, helping the company survive the third-party transition. He held failed talks with Microsoft about a sale or merger with its Xbox division. According to former Microsoft executive Joachim Kempin, Microsoft founder, Bill Gates, decided against acquiring Sega because "he didn't think that Sega had enough muscle to eventually stop Sony". A business alliance with Microsoft was announced whereby Sega would develop 11 games for the Xbox. As part of the restructuring, nearly one third of Sega's Tokyo workforce was laid off in 2001. 2002 was Sega's fifth consecutive fiscal year of net losses.

After Okawa's death, Hideki Sato, a 30-year Sega veteran who had worked on Sega's consoles, became the company president. Following poor sales in 2002, Sega cut its profit forecast for 2003 by 90 percent, and explored opportunities for mergers. In 2003, Sega began talks with Sammy Corporation–a pachinko and pachislot manufacturing company–and Namco. The president of Sammy, Hajime Satomi, had been mentored by Okawa and was previously asked to be CEO of Sega. On February 13, Sega announced that it would merge with Sammy; however, as late as April 17, Sega was still in talks with Namco, which was attempting to overturn the merger. Sega's consideration of Namco's offer upset Sammy executives. The day after Sega announced it no longer planned to merge with Sammy, Namco withdrew its offer.

In 2003, Sato and COO Tetsu Kamaya stepped down. Sato was replaced by Hisao Oguchi, the head of the Sega studio Hitmaker. Moore left Sega in January 2003, feeling that the Japanese executives were refusing to adapt to industry changes, such as the demand for mature games such as Grand Theft Auto III. Hideaki Irie, who had worked at Agetec and ASCII, became the new president and COO of Sega of America in October 2003.

=== 2003–2015: Sammy takeover and business expansion ===
Sega Sammy Holdings (current logo pictured) was founded in 2004 with pachinko and pachislot manufacturer Sammy Corporation's purchase of Sega.

In August 2003, Sammy bought 22.4 percent of Sega's shares from CSK, making Sammy Sega's largest shareholder. In the same year, Hajime Satomi said Sega's activity would focus on its profitable arcade business as opposed to loss-incurring home software development. Successful console games during this period include entries in the Sonic the Hedgehog, Puyo Puyo, Virtua Fighter, Super Monkey Ball, Phantasy Star Online and Sakura Wars franchises. In 2004, Sega Sammy Holdings, an entertainment conglomerate, was created; Sega and Sammy became subsidiaries of the new holding company, both companies operating independently while the executive departments merged. According to the first Sega Sammy Annual Report, the merger went ahead as both companies were facing difficulties. Satomi said Sega had been operating at a loss for nearly ten years, while Sammy feared stagnation and over-reliance of its highly profitable pachislot and pachinko machine business and wanted to diversify. Sammy acquired the remaining percentages of Sega, completing a takeover. The stock swap deal valued Sega between $1.45 billion and $1.8 billion. Sega Sammy Holdings was structured into four parts: Consumer Business (video games), Amusement Machine Business (arcade games), Amusement Center Business (Sega's theme parks and arcades) and Pachislot and Pachinko Business (Sammy's pachinko and pachislot business).

According to an industry survey, as of 2005, sales of arcade machines were up for the previous four years in Japan, while down for nine straight years overseas. In response to the decline of the global arcade industry in the late 1990s, Sega created several novel concepts tailored to the Japanese market. Derby Owners Club was an arcade machine with memory cards for data storage. Testing of Derby Owners Club in a Chicago arcade showed that it had become the most popular machine at the location, with a 92% replay rate. The cabinet was too expensive and the game did not entice casual users which are essential to the western arcade market. While the Japanese market retained core players, western arcades had become more focused on casual players, and Sega Amusements Europe, the entity created to officially distribute and manufacture Sega's machines on the continent after the consolidation of its regional divisions, subsequently decided to develop more games locally that were better suited to western tastes.

In 2005, the GameWorks chain of arcades came under the sole ownership of Sega, which previously was shared with Vivendi Universal, and remained under its ownership until 2011. In 2009, Sega Republic, an indoor theme park, opened in Dubai. Sega gradually reduced its arcades from 450 in 2005 to around 200 in 2015. Arcade machine sales incurred higher profits than the company's console, mobile and PC games on a year-to-year basis until the fiscal year of 2014.

In order to drive growth in western markets, Sega announced new leadership for Sega of America and Sega Europe in 2005. Simon Jeffery became president and COO of Sega of America, and Mike Hayes president and COO for Sega Europe. In 2009, Hayes became president of the combined outfit of both Sega of America and Sega Europe, due to Jeffery leaving. Sega sold Visual Concepts to Take-Two Interactive, and purchased UK-based developer Creative Assembly, known for its Total War series. In the same year, Sega Racing Studio was also formed by former Codemasters employees. In 2006, Sega Europe purchased Sports Interactive, known for its Football Manager series. Sega found success in the Japanese market with the Yakuza, Phantasy Star and Hatsune Miku: Project DIVA series. (Note: Attributed to multiple references:) Sega began providing the 3D imaging for Hatsune Miku holographic concerts in 2010. Sega also distributes games from smaller Japanese game developers and sells localizations of Western games in Japan. In 2013, Index Corporation was purchased by Sega Sammy after going bankrupt. The year before, Sega signed a deal to distribute Atlus titles in Japan. After the buyout, Sega implemented a corporate spin-off with Index. The latter's game assets were rebranded as Atlus, a wholly owned subsidiary of Sega. Atlus is known for the Persona and Megami Tensei series. The Sonic the Hedgehog games had grossed over $5 billion in sales by 2014.

In the mobile market, Sega released its first app on the iTunes Store with a version of Super Monkey Ball for iOS in 2008. Due in part to the decline of packaged game sales worldwide in the 2010s, Sega began layoffs and closed five offices based in Europe and Australia on July 1, 2012. This was to focus on the digital game market, such as personal computers and mobile devices. In 2012, Sega also began acquiring studios for mobile development, studios such as Hardlight, Three Rings Design, and Demiurge Studios becoming fully owned subsidiaries. 19 older mobile games were pulled due to quality concerns in May 2015.

To streamline operations, Sega established operational firms for each of its businesses in the 2010s. In 2012, Sega established Sega Networks as a subsidiary company for its mobile games. The same year, Sega Entertainment was established for Sega's amusement facility business. In January 2015, Sega of America announced its relocation from San Francisco to Atlus USA's headquarters in Irvine, California, which was completed later that year. From 2005 to 2015, Sega's operating income generally saw improvements compared to Sega's past financial problems, but was not profitable every year, reporting overall losses in 2008, 2009 and 2012.

Sega operating income 2005–2015, Japanese yen in millions
Business year	2005	2006	2007	2008	2009	2010	2011	2012	2013	2014	2015
Amusement Machine Sales	7,423	12,176	11,682	7,152	6,890	7,094	7,317	7,415	1,902	−1,264	−2,356
Amusement Center Operations	5,472	9,244	132	−9,807	−7,520	−1,338	342	355	1,194	60	−946
Consumer Business	−8,809	9,244	1,748	−5,989	−941	6,332	1,969	−15,182	−732	2,089	4,033

=== 2015–2020: Sega Games and Sega Interactive ===
Sega Interactive Co., Ltd.
- Native name: 株式会社セガ・インタラクティブ
- Romanized name: Kabushiki-gaisha Sega Intarakutibu
- Type: Subsidiary
- Founded: April 1, 2015; 11 years ago
- Defunct: March 31, 2020; 6 years ago
- Fate: Merged with Sega Games
- Headquarters: Nishi-Shinagawa, Shinagawa, Tokyo, Japan
- Products: Arcade games Arcade systems
- Number of employees: 3,238 (2020)
- Divisions: Sega AM1; Sega AM2
- Subsidiaries: Sega Logistics Services; Sega Amusements International

In April 2015, Sega Corporation was reorganized into Sega Group, one of the three groups of Sega Sammy Holdings. Sega Holdings Co., Ltd. was established, with four business sectors under its control. Haruki Satomi, son of Hajime Satomi, took office as president and CEO of the company in April 2015. As a result, Sega Corporation rebranded itself to Sega Games Co., Ltd. (Note: 株式会社セガゲームス, Kabushiki-gaisha Sega Gēmuzu) and continued to manage home video games, while Sega Interactive Co., Ltd. (Note: 株式会社セガ・インタラクティブ, Kabushiki-gaisha Sega Intarakutibu) was founded to take control of the arcade division. Sega Networks merged with Sega Games in 2015. At the Tokyo Game Show in September 2016, Sega announced that it had acquired the intellectual property and development rights to all games developed and published by Technosoft. Effective from January 2017, 85.1% of the shares in Sega's theme park business became owned by China Animations Character Co., renaming the former Sega Live Creation to CA Sega Joypolis.

Sega Sammy Holdings announced in April 2017 that it would relocate its head office functions and domestic subsidiaries located in the Tokyo metropolitan area to Shinagawa by January 2018. This was to consolidate scattered head office functions including Sega Sammy Holdings, Sammy Corporation, Sega Holdings, Sega Games, Atlus, Sammy Networks, and Dartslive. Sega's previous headquarters in Ōta was sold in 2019.

In June 2017, Chris Bergstresser replaced Jurgen Post as president and COO of Sega Europe. In June 2018, Gary Dale, formerly of Rockstar Games and Take-Two Interactive, replaced Chris Bergstresser as president and COO of Sega Europe. A few months later, Ian Curran, a former executive at THQ and Acclaim Entertainment, replaced John Cheng as president and COO of Sega of America in August 2018. In October 2018, Sega reported favorable western sales results from games such as Yakuza 6 and Persona 5, due to the localization work of Atlus USA.

Despite a 35-percent increase in the sale of console games and success in its PC game business, profits fell 70 percent for the 2018 fiscal year in comparison to the previous year, mainly due to the digital games market which includes mobile games as well as Phantasy Star Online 2. In response, Sega announced that for its digital games it would focus on releases for its existing intellectual property and also focus on growth areas such as packaged games in the overseas market. Sega blamed the loss on market miscalculations and having too many games under development. Projects in development at Sega included a new game in the Yakuza series, the Sonic the Hedgehog film, and the Sega Genesis Mini, which was released in September 2019. In May 2019, Sega acquired Two Point Studios, known for Two Point Hospital.

On April 1, 2020, Sega Interactive merged with Sega Games. The company was again renamed to Sega Corporation, while Sega Holdings Co., Ltd. was renamed Sega Group Corporation. According to a company statement, the move was made to allow greater research and development flexibility. Also in April 2020, Sega sold Demiurge Studios to Demiurge co-founder Albert Reed. Demiurge said it would continue to support the mobile games it developed under Sega.

=== 2020–present: Recent history ===
As part of its 60th anniversary, Sega announced the Game Gear Micro microconsole for release on October 6, 2020, in Japan. Other anniversary projects include the Astro City Mini and several other merchandise. Sega also announced its Fog Gaming platform, which uses the unused processing power of arcade machines in Japanese arcades overnight to help power cloud gaming applications.

Sega made a number of restructuring moves in the early 2020s. During the latter half of 2020, many of the financial gains Sega made in the earlier part of the year dissolved due to the impact of the COVID-19 pandemic on its Sega Entertainment division, which ran its arcades. That November, Sega Sammy sold 85.1% of its shares in the division to Genda Inc., though the Sega branding and coin-operated machines continued to be used in arcades. Arcade game development was unaffected by the sale. In January 2022, Sega sold the remaining portion of this division to Genda. Sega Amusement International was sold via a management buyout to Kaizen Entertainment, however the Sega brand will still be used for all games and the company name remains through a royalty agreement. Sega Group Corporation was formally dissolved by its parent company in 2021.

Contrasting its losses brought forth by amusement operations in 2020, sales and critical reception of Sega's home console games improved; Metacritic named Sega the best publisher of the year in 2020. Of its 28 releases that year, 95% had "good" Metacritic scores (above 75/100), including two with "great" scores (above 90/100 for Persona 5 Royal and Yakuza 0), with an average Metacritic score of 81.6 for all 2020 Sega releases. Phantasy Star Online 2 was reported in 2021 to have made over US$900 million since its release in 2012. In 2022, Sega announced its "Super Game" project, a series of high-budget games expected to generate lifetime sales of US$672 million, and allocated about US$200 million into its budget across three years. The project was canceled in May 2026 after Sega retreated from free-to-play games. In 2023, Sega acquired the Finnish video game developer Rovio Entertainment, known for the Angry Birds series, for US$776 million.

On April 24, 2023, 144 Sega of America employees announced plans to file a new union election under the new labor union, Allied Employees Guild Improving Sega (AEGIS), which is allied with the Communication Workers of America via CWA Local 9510. AEGIS represents workers from departments including marketing, quality assurance, development and localization, making it the first of its kind in the game industry in the United States. On July 10, 2023, it was announced that workers had voted 91–26 to form the union. AEGIS is undergoing certification with the National Labor Relations Board before going into bargaining.

In May 2023, Sega announced that 121 employees at Relic Entertainment had been made redundant to focus on cored franchises. That same year, Sega cancelled its upcoming shooter Hyenas and began restructuring its British and European operations. At the Game Awards 2023, Sega announced an initiative to revive many of its dormant franchises, beginning with new Crazy Taxi, Golden Axe, Jet Set Radio, Shinobi and Streets of Rage games. The Washington Post characterized the announcement as a return to Sega's 1990s "bohemian" and "countercultural" spirit. The co-CEO, Shuji Utsumi, said Sega wanted to "show edginess and a rebellious mindset", and that the industry was now large enough to sustain its less conventional games. In November 2023, AEGIS filed an unfair labor practice after Sega proposed a plan to phase out temporary employees by February 2024, which would affect around 80 employees.

In January 2024, Jurgen Post rejoined Sega Europe to become COO of its western studios and also serve as managing director. That month, Shuji Utsumi became the president, COO and CEO of Sega of America and Europe. Utsumi had previously helped found Sony Computer Entertainment, where he helped launch the original PlayStation, before moving to Sega and assisting with the North American Dreamcast launch. After a period with Disney Interactive, he co-founded Q Entertainment before returning to Sega in 2020. On January 9, Sega Sammy Holdings announced that Sega's amusement machine business would be demerged and transferred to Sega Toys, which will be renamed Sega Fave Corporation. The changes will take effect by April. On February 29, Sega appointed Justin Scarpone as an executive vice president of a group to expand Sega's transmedia strategy.

In January 2024, Sega of America announced that it would lay off 61 workers at its Irvine, California location. AEGIS had been negotiating with Sega of America since November to reduce the total redundancies. On March 27, 2024, AEGIS announced that its workers had ratified a contract with Sega of America, focusing on key issues. The following day, Sega laid off 240 workers from its British and European operations, including Sega Europe, Creative Assembly, and Hardlight, and sold Relic Entertainment to an external investor. On November 8, Sega sold Amplitude Studios to its staff via a management buyout. Sonic X Shadow Generations, Like a Dragon: Infinite Wealth and Persona 3 Reload reached a million sales within a week, a record for each of the respective franchises. The Sonic the Hedgehog movie franchise made over 1 billion dollars.

== Corporate structure ==
Since 2004, Sega has been a subsidiary of Sega Sammy Holdings. Sega's global headquarters are in Shinagawa, Tokyo, Japan. Sega also has offices in Irvine, California (as Sega of America), in London (as Sega Europe), in Seoul, South Korea (as Sega Publishing Korea), and in Singapore, Hong Kong, Shanghai, and Taipei. In other regions, Sega has contracted distributors for its games and consoles, such as Tectoy in Brazil. Sega has had offices in France, Germany, Spain, and Australia; those markets have since contracted distributors.

Relations between the regional offices have not always been smooth. Some conflict in the 1990s may have been caused by Sega president Nakayama and his admiration for Sega of America; according to Kalinske, "There were some guys in the executive suites who really didn't like that Nakayama in particular appeared to favor the US executives. A lot of the Japanese executives were maybe a little jealous, and I think some of that played into the decisions that were made." By contrast, author Steven L. Kent said Nakayama bullied American executives and that Nakayama believed the Japanese executives made the best decisions. Kent also said Sega of America CEOs Kalinske, Stolar, and Moore dreaded meeting with Sega of Japan executives.

=== Subsidiaries of Sega Corporation ===
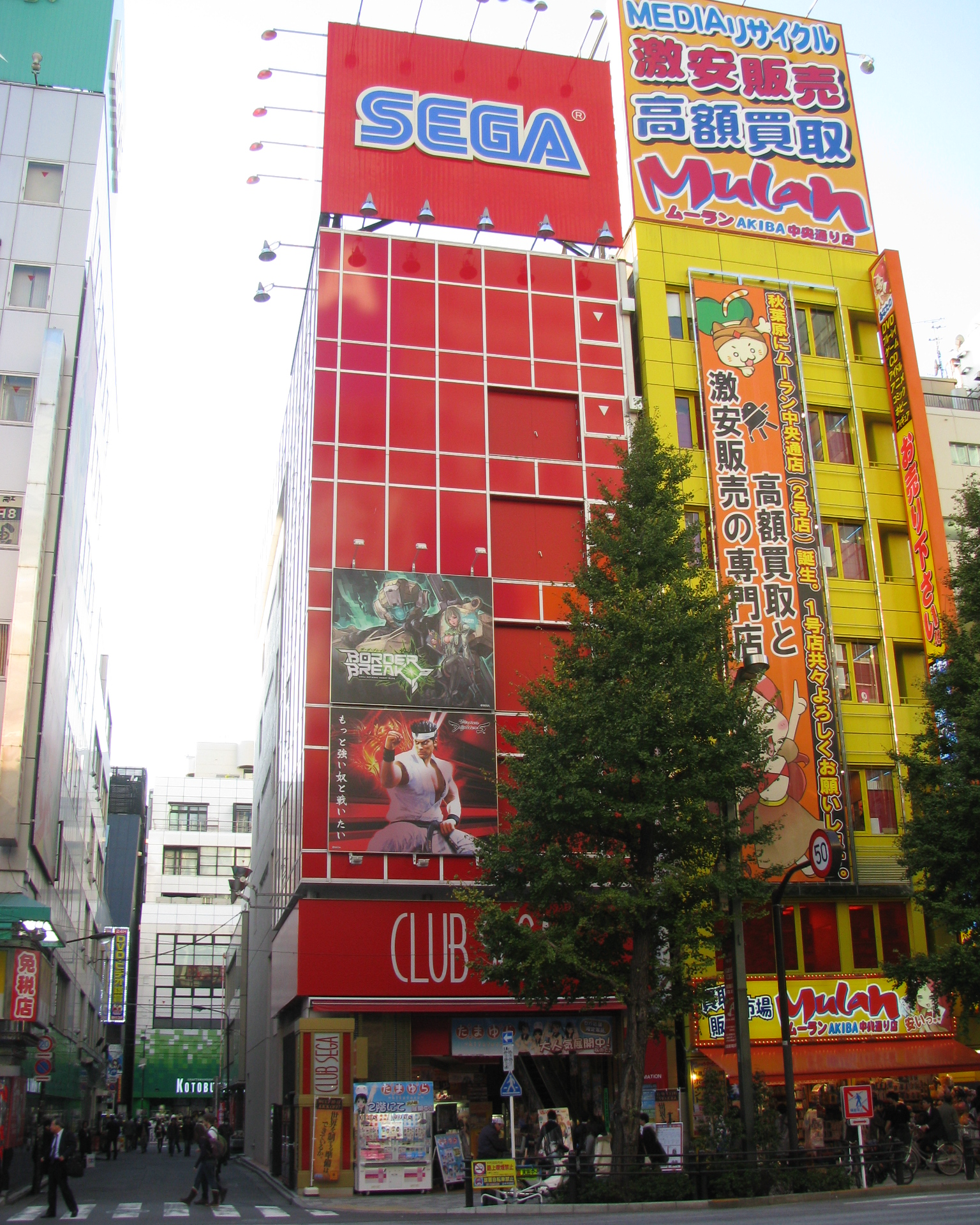
A Club Sega game center in Akihabara, Tokyo. The Sega branding was removed in 2022.

After the formation of Sega Group in 2015 and the founding of Sega Holdings, the former Sega Corporation was renamed Sega Games Co., Ltd. Under this structure, Sega Games was responsible for the home video game market and consumer development, while Sega Interactive Co., Ltd., comprised Sega's arcade game business. The two were consolidated in 2020, renamed as Sega Corporation, and Sega Group Corporation was formally absorbed into Sega Corporation in 2021. The company includes Sega Networks, which handles game development for smartphones. Sega Corporation develops and publishes games for major video game consoles and has not expressed interest in developing consoles again. According to former Sega Europe CEO Mike Brogan, "There is no future in selling hardware. In any market, through competition, the hardware eventually becomes a commodity ... If a company has to sell hardware then it should only be to leverage software, even if that means taking a hit on the hardware."

Sega Fave Corporation, originally known as Yonezawa Toys and acquired by Sega in 1991, has created toys for children's franchises such as Oshare Majo: Love and Berry, Mushiking: King of the Beetles, Lilpri, Bakugan, Jewelpet, Rilu Rilu Fairilu, Dinosaur King, and Hero Bank. Products released in the West include the home planetarium Homestar and the robot dog iDog. The Homestar was released in 2005 and has been improved several times. Its newest model, Flux, was released in 2019. The series is developed by the Japanese inventor and entrepreneur Takayuki Ohira. As a recognized specialist for professional planetariums, he has received numerous innovation prizes and supplies large planetariums internationally with his company Megastar. Sega Toys also inherited the Sega Pico handheld system and produced Pico software.

Since the late 1960s, Sega has been affiliated with operations of bowling alleys and arcades through its former Sega Entertainment Co., Ltd. subsidiary in Japan, as well as a number of other smaller regional subsidiaries in other countries. Initiatives to expand operations in other territories, such as the US, UK, France, Spain, and Taiwan, have been more short-lived, and following the 85.1% majority acquisition of Sega Entertainment's shares in November 2020 to mitigate losses caused by the COVID-19 pandemic, Sega's arcades in Japan since have been run under Genda Incorporated's Genda GiGO Entertainment division. Its DartsLive subsidiary creates electronic darts games, while Sega Logistics Service distributes and repairs arcade games.

In 2015, Sega and Japanese advertising agency Hakuhodo formed a joint venture, Stories LLC, to create entertainment for film and TV. Stories LLC has exclusive licensing rights to adapt Sega properties into film and television, and has partnered with producers to develop series based on properties including Shinobi, Golden Axe, Virtua Fighter, The House of the Dead, and Crazy Taxi.

=== Research and development ===
Sega releases games developed by its research and development teams. The Sonic the Hedgehog franchise, maintained through Sega's Sonic Team division, is one of the best-selling franchises in video games. Sega has also acquired third-party studios including Atlus, Play Heart, Creative Assembly, Hardlight, Sports Interactive, Two Point Studios, and Rovio Entertainment.

Sega's software research and development teams began with one development division operating under Sega's longtime head of R&D, Hisashi Suzuki. As the market increased for home video game consoles, Sega expanded with three Consumer Development (CS) divisions. After October 1983, arcade development expanded to three teams: Sega DD No. 1, 2, and 3. Some time after the release of Power Drift, Sega restructured its teams again as the Sega Amusement Machine Research and Development Teams, or AM teams. Each arcade division was segregated, and a rivalry existed between the arcade and consumer development divisions.

In what has been called "a brief moment of remarkable creativity", in 2000, Sega restructured its arcade and console development teams into ten semi-autonomous studios headed by the company's top designers. The studios were United Game Artists, Smilebit, Hitmaker, Sega Rosso, WOW Entertainment, Overworks, Wave Master, Amusement Vision, Sega-AM2, and Sonic Team. Sega's design houses were encouraged to experiment and benefited from a relatively lax approval process. After taking over as company president in 2003, Hisao Oguchi announced his intention to consolidate Sega's studios. Prior to the acquisition by Sammy, Sega began the process of re-integrating its subsidiaries into the main company. Toshihiro Nagoshi, formerly the head of Amusement Vision, recalls this period as "in many ways a labour of love" from Sega, teaching the creatives the experience of managing a business.

Sega still operates first-party studios as departments of its research and development division. Sonic Team exists as Sega's CS2 research and development department, while Sega's CS3 or Online department has developed games such as Phantasy Star Online 2, and Sega's AM2 department has more recently worked on projects such as smartphone game Soul Reverse Zero. Toshihiro Nagoshi remained involved with research and development as Sega's chief creative officer or creative director while working on the Yakuza series until 2021. Other studios include Ignited Artists and Play Heart.

== Legacy ==
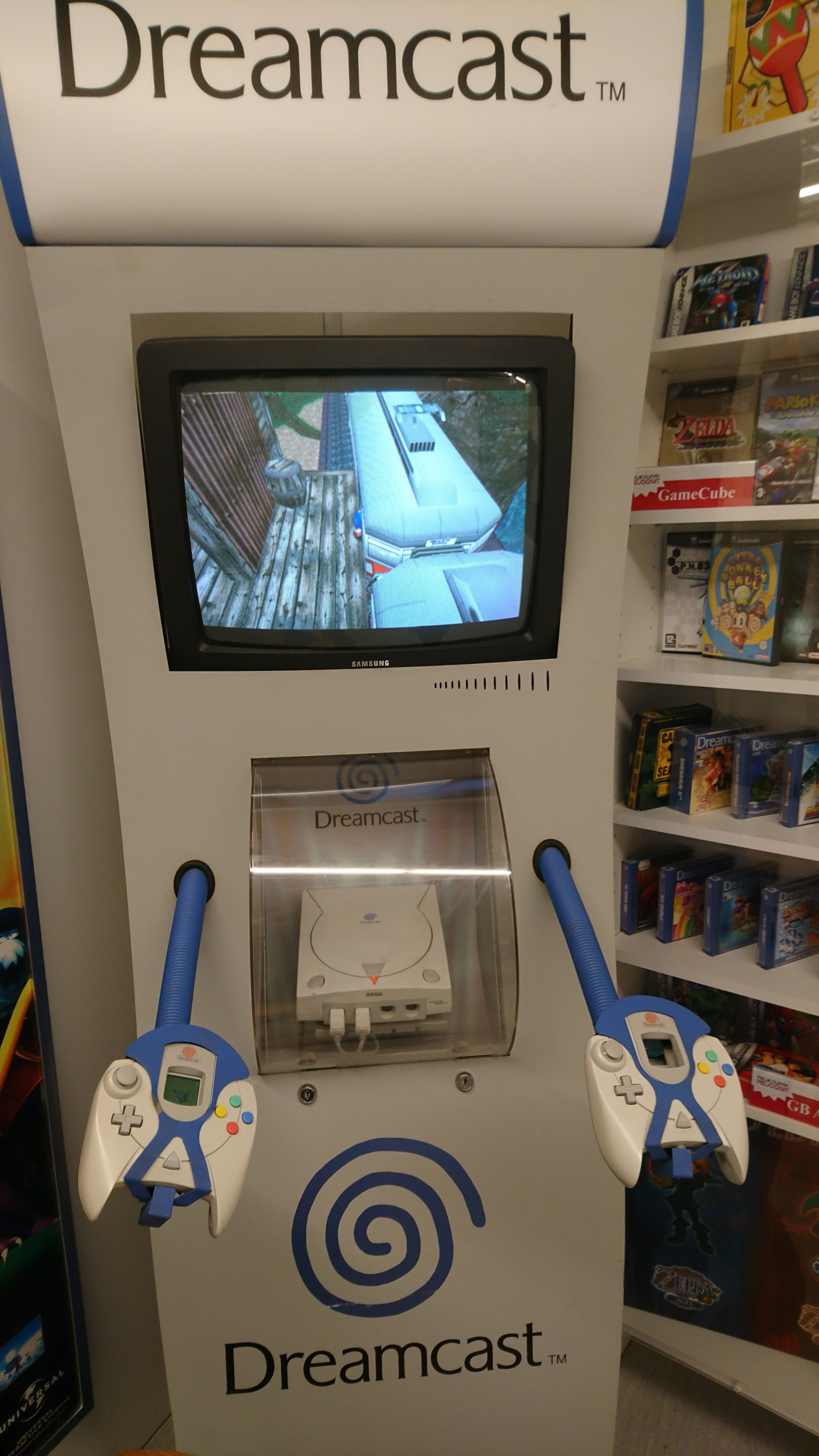
A demo Dreamcast kiosk at the Finnish Museum of Games in Tampere, Finland, in 2017

Sega is one of the world's most prolific arcade game producers, having developed more than 500 games, 70 franchises, and 20 arcade system boards since 1981. It has been recognized by Guinness World Records for this achievement. Of Sega's arcade division, Eurogamer's Martin Robinson said, "It's boisterous, broad and with a neat sense of showmanship running through its range. On top of that, it has something that's often evaded its console-dwelling cousin: success." Hideki Sato, who developed most of Sega's hardware has said a major failure of Sega has been not integrating its arcade and console divisions more for synergy.

The Sega Genesis is often ranked among the best consoles in history. In 2014, USgamer's Jeremy Parish credited it for galvanizing the market by breaking Nintendo's near-monopoly, helping create modern sports game franchises, and popularizing television games in the UK. Kalinske felt Sega had innovated by developing games for an older demographic and pioneering the "street date" concept with the simultaneous North American and European release of Sonic the Hedgehog 2. Sega of America's marketing campaign for the Genesis influenced marketing for later consoles.

Despite its commercial failure, the Saturn is well regarded for its library, though it has been criticized for a lack of high-profile franchise releases. Edge wrote that "hardened loyalists continue to reminisce about the console that brought forth games like Burning Rangers, Guardian Heroes, Dragon Force, and Panzer Dragoon Saga." Sega's management was criticized for its handling of the Saturn. According to Greg Sewart of 1Up.com, "the Saturn will go down in history as one of the most troubled, and greatest, systems of all time".

The Dreamcast is remembered for being ahead of its time, with several concepts that became standard in consoles, such as motion controls and online functionality. Its demise has been connected with transitions in the video game industry. In 1001 Video Games You Must Play Before You Die, Duncan Harris wrote that the Dreamcast's end "signaled the demise of arcade gaming culture... Sega's console gave hope that things were not about to change for the worse and that the tenets of fast fun and bright, attractive graphics were not about to sink into a brown and green bog of realistic war games." Parish contrasted the Dreamcast's diverse library with the "suffocating sense of conservatism" that pervaded the industry in the following decade.

In Eurogamer, Damien McFerran wrote that Sega's decisions in the late 1990s were "a tragic spectacle of overconfidence and woefully misguided business practice". Travis Fahs of IGN noted that since the Sammy takeover Sega had developed fewer games and outsourced to more western studios, and that its arcade operations had been significantly reduced. Nonetheless, he wrote: "Sega was one of the most active, creative, and productive developers the industry has ever known, and nothing that can happen to their name since will change that." In 2015, Sega president Haruki Satomi told Famitsu that, in the previous ten years, Sega had "betrayed" the trust of older fans and that he hoped to re-establish the Sega brand. During the promotion of the Sega Genesis Mini, Sega executive manager Hiroyuki Miyazaki reflected on Sega's history, saying, "I feel like Sega has never been the champion, at the top of all the video game companies, but I feel like a lot of people love Sega because of the underdog image." Former Sega management cited the absence of Dragon Quest and Final Fantasy games on its home consoles as a reason for the console division's struggles, especially in Japan. In his 2018 book The Sega Arcade Revolution, Horowitz connected Sega's decline in the arcades after 1995 with broader industry changes. He argued that its most serious problems came from the loss of its creative talent, particularly Yuji Naka and Yu Suzuki, after the Sammy takeover, but concluded that "as of this writing, Sega is in its best financial shape of the past two decades. The company has endured."

== Companies founded by ex-employees ==
Over the years, and like with other large game companies in Japan (such as Capcom and Square), a number of staff members have left the company to start their own studios. Among the first of these was Arc System Works, founded in 1988 by programmer Minoru Kidooka.

Hiroshi Hamagaki and Tomo Kimura left in October 1990 to start Genki, which would go on to develop the popular Tokyo Xtreme Racer (Shutokō Battle) series.

After working as designer for the first two Tekken games for Namco, Virtua Fighter designer Seiichi Ishii founded DreamFactory in November 1995 as a subsidiary of Square, bringing with him many Sega (as well as Namco) employees. DreamFactory developed Tobal No. 1, its sequel, and Ehrgeiz, as well as The Bouncer. Amidst financial troubles at Square, DreamFactory split from the company in 2001 to become independent. As of 2024, Ishii (who now lives in Montreal) continues to manage the studio from his home.

Adrian Stephens and Peter Morawiec of Sega Technical Institute founded Luxoflux in January 1997 after Sega of America shuttered STI in December 1996. Luxoflux developed Vigilante 8 and the True Crime series for Activision, which acquired the studio in October 2002. Activision closed Luxoflux in February 2010. Stephens and Morawiec had already left the studio in 2006 and, the following year, established Isopod Labs, which developed Vigilante 8 Arcade.

Marvelous Entertainment was established in 1997 by Haruki Nakayama (son of then-Sega president Hayao Nakayama), who was in charge of the media mix development of Sakura Wars. In 2011, Marvelous merged with AQ Interactive and Liveware to become MarvelousAQL (now the second incarnation of Marvelous).

After a short stint at General Entertainment, where he worked on Pen Pen TriIcelon, former Sega marketer Masanobu Tsukamoto founded Land Ho! in 1999 with members of the General team who had also worked on the game.

Artoon was founded on August 27, 1999 by Sonic the Hedgehog co-creator Naoto Ohshima and executive Yoji Ishii, and was composed of Sonic Team and Team Andromeda members, such as Manabu Kusunoki (art director for the Panzer Dragoon series). Artoon developed Blinx: The Time Sweeper, as well as Yoshi's Island DS for Nintendo and working with Mistwalker on Blue Dragon. Becoming a wholly-owned subsidiary of AQ Interactive in 2005, the studio was absorbed into AQ in 2010, and Ohshima, Ishii, and key Artoon members formed a successor around the same time, Arzest.

studiofake was founded by AM2 programmer and director Keiji Okayasu on September 19, 2000, and co-developed Odama with Vivarium. In May 2022, it was renamed to FUN Corporation.

Sonic Team planner Kaya Takafumi left Sega in 2001 and founded Signal Talk the following year, developing mahjong title Maru-Jan.

Space Channel 5 and Rez creator and United Game Artists head Tetsuya Mizuguchi founded Q Entertainment in October 2003 upon leaving Sega following the merger of UGA into Sonic Team the previous month, alongside senior vice-president Shuji Utsumi. Q developed Lumines and Meteos, as well as Rez HD. In 2014, Mizuguchi started Enhance, Inc., which released Tetris Effect and Rez Infinite.

Sonic the Hedgehog co-creator, Sonic Team president and Sega executive officer Yuji Naka left during the development of the series' 2006 reboot and founded Prope on May 23, 2006. In 2018, he joined Square Enix, where he created Balan Wonderworld with the aforementioned Arzest, and revealed the following year that Prope had been downsized to a one-man company in April 2017. Naka would later be arrested for insider trading in 2022.

Kenji Sasaki, director of the Sega Rally series and many of the company's racing titles, left in 2005 and founded arcade developer Bitster in June 2006.

Having left the company to join Game Arts in 1996, Kotaro Hayashida founded mobile game developer Liber Entertainment ten years later in September 2006.

Grounding Inc. was founded by Space Channel 5 producer Mineko Okamura, Panzer Dragoon creator Yukio Futatsugi, and designer Noboru Hotta (a founding member of Q Entertainment) on February 7, 2007, and developed Crimson Dragon, as well as Sakura Samurai: Art of the Sword and Space Channel 5 VR: Kinda Funky News Flash!. In addition, Grounding also specializes in board games, with one of its releases being Machi Koro.

Yu Suzuki founded Ys Net in 2008, and officially departed Sega three years later in September 2011. Ys Net developed Shenmue III (a project crowdfunded through Kickstarter) and the Apple Arcade title Air Twister.

Director Takeshi Hirai, who left Sega alongside Mizuguchi to become chief technology officer at Q Entertainment, founded Neilo in 2010, developing Orgarhythm.

Segagaga and Astro Boy: Omega Factor director Tez Okano established indie studio HUGA in January 2014, a studio specializing in retro-styled side-scrolling shooters.

AM3 member Shoichiro Kanazawa founded the support studio ArAtA in June 2016.

After leaving Sega in November 2021, Toshihiro Nagoshi and Daisuke Sato joined NetEase, where they formed Nagoshi Studio alongside other former Sega staffers. The studio is currently developing Gang of Dragon.

== See also ==
- List of Sega video game franchises
- Lists of Sega games
- Sega, S.A. SONIC
- Sega Technical Institute
- PlayStation
- Xbox
- Nintendo
- Atari
- SNK
