= Duplex at 22-26 Johnson Street =

- U.S. National Register of Historic Places
- Location within Vermont Location within the United States
- Location: 22-26 Johnson St., Burlington, Vermont
- Coordinates: 44°28′56″N 73°12′58″W
- Area: less than one acre
- Built: c. 1888
- Built by: Eli Johnson
- Architectural style: Vernacular
- NRHP reference No.: 12000292
- Added to NRHP: May 1, 2012

The Duplex at 22-26 Johnson Street is a historic multiunit residential building in Burlington, Vermont. Built about 1888, it is a good local example of vernacular Queen Anne Victorian architecture, built as worker housing in the growing city. It was listed on the National Register of Historic Places in 2012.

== Description and history ==
22-26 Johnson Street is a 2-1/2 story wood frame building, set on the east side of Johnson Street a short way south of its junction with Peru Street. The Old North End neighborhood it stands in is just north of Burlington's central business district, and is densely built with residential buildings. The building is basically rectangular in shape, with a gabled roof and clapboarded exterior. Small porches project from near the rear of either side. The building's style is vernacular, with simple window surrounds and corner boards, and square columns supporting the hip-roofed porches. The building interiors retain only original floor layouts; the building houses two side-by-side two-story units.

Eli Johnson built this house as part of his development of Johnson Street, begun in 1888. Johnson was a prominent local businessman, with a partnership interest in a printing firm and also in a retail pharmacy on College Street. He began the development during a period when the city's economic growth had led to housing shortages for working-class families. Although some of his buildings exhibit touches of Italianate and Queen Anne styling, this one is devoid of such more elaborate touches. Early residents of Johnson Street were typically of English or Irish extraction.

== See also ==
- Apartment Building at 27 and 31 Peru Street and 29 Johnson Street
- National Register of Historic Places listings in Chittenden County, Vermont
