= Lucy Ruggles House =

Historic house in Vermont, United States

- U.S. National Register of Historic Places
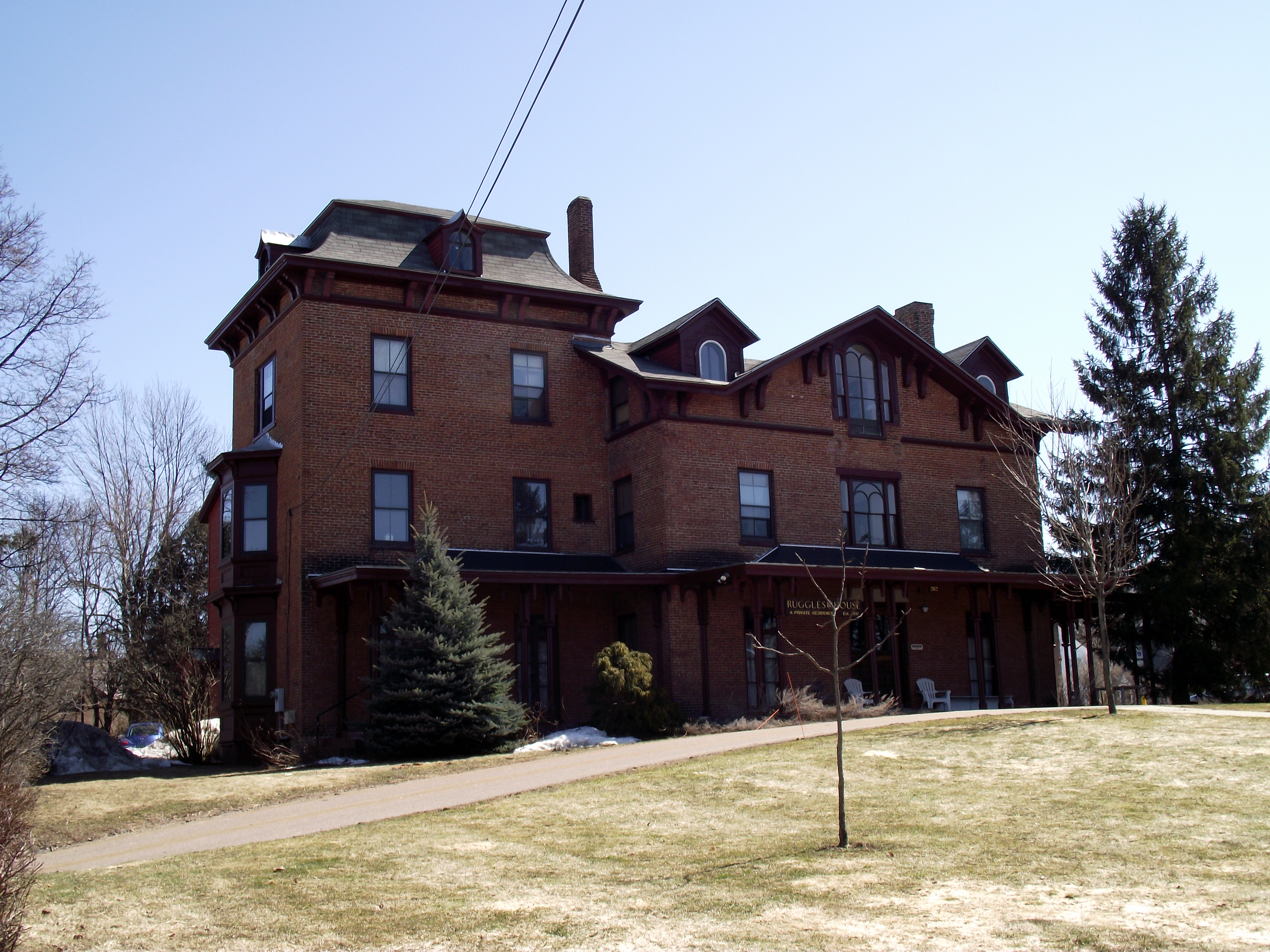

- Location within Vermont Location within the United States
- Location: 262 S. Prospect St., Burlington, Vermont
- Coordinates: 44°28′23″N 73°12′0″W
- Area: 1 acre (0.40 ha)
- Built: 1857
- Architectural style: Italianate
- NRHP reference No.: 05001421
- Added to NRHP: December 16, 2005

The Lucy Ruggles House is a historic house at 262 South Prospect Street in Burlington, Vermont, USA. Its main section built in 1857, it is a prominent local example of Italianate architecture, with both older and newer ells to the rear. It is now home to a non-profit senior living facility, operating on the premises since 1932. It was listed on the National Register of Historic Places in 2005.

== Description and history ==
The Lucy Ruggles House is located in eastern Burlington, south of the central campus of the University of Vermont. It is located on the east side of South Prospect Street, between the two ends of Robinson Parkway, a residential loop road built on part of the house's former estate. The house is a 2 1/2-story brick building, whose main section is Italianate in style. Distinctive features include paired brackets in the eaves, a single-story porch wrapping across the front and side, and large three-story mansard-roofed tower at the front left. To the rear of the house is a two-story ell that was probably built in the 1820s, with a 20th-century addition extending further to the rear. The interior of the main block retains most of its original Italianate woodwork, while the first ell contains traces of Greek Revival styling.

The oldest portion of the house, its first ell, was probably built in the 1820s by Jesse Hollister, a veteran of the American Revolutionary War. Its Italianate main section was built in 1857 by George DeForest, a resident of New York City who turned the property into a summer estate. In 1927, 10 acres (4.0 ha) of the estate, including the main house, was purchased by Dr. Charles Robinson, who subdivided the land for additional housing, and opened a sanitarium in the house.

In 1930, the house was purchased by the Ruggles Foundation. Established by bequest from Lucy Ruggles, a teacher with no connection to Burlington, the foundation's objective was to provide an affordable retirement premises for teachers. Opened in 1932, its endowment declined over time, and the facility was slated to close in 2000. It was purchased by Cathedral Square in 2001 and extensively rehabilitated, including restoration of its public rooms and the construction of the rear addition. It now consists of 14 studio apartments.

== See also ==
- National Register of Historic Places listings in Chittenden County, Vermont
