= Murray–Isham Farm =

- U.S. National Register of Historic Places
- U.S. Historic district
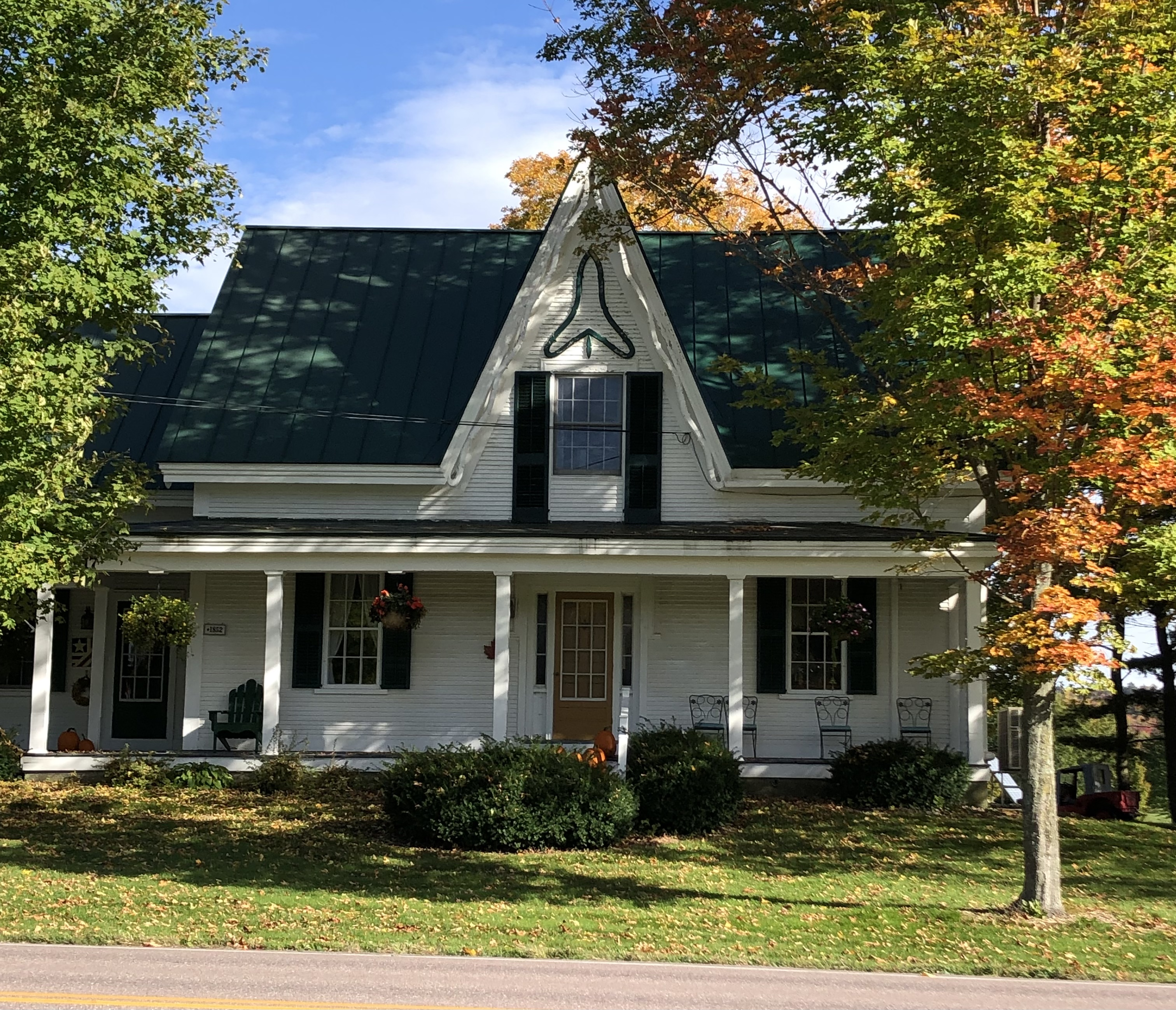
- 1850s farmhouse

- Location within Vermont Location within the United States
- Location: 741 Oak Hill Rd. (Town Hwy. 1), Williston, Vermont
- Coordinates: 44°23′34″N 73°5′47″W
- Area: 162 acres (66 ha)
- Built: 1850
- Architectural style: Gothic Revival
- MPS: Agricultural Resources of Vermont MPS
- NRHP reference No.: 92001668
- Added to NRHP: December 7, 1992

The Murray–Isham Farm, or more recently just the Isham Family Farm, is a historic farm property at 3515 Oak Hill Road in Williston, Vermont. The farm has been in active use since about 1850, most of them by the Isham family. The farmstead includes a c. 1850 Gothic Revival house and farm buildings of similar vintage. It was listed on the National Register of Historic Places in 1992, and is the subject of a conservation easement preserving its agricultural character.

== Description and history ==
The Isham farm consists of 162 acres (66 ha) of land, divided into two parcels. The larger western parcel is itself divided by Oak Hill Road, with the farmstead on the smaller eastern half. Meeting at the easternmost corner of the larger parcel is a roughly rectangular but otherwise landlocked parcel. The farm property has for many years served as a dairy farm, and its land is divided into cropland, pasture, hay, and woodlots. The farm complex occupies about 4 acres (1.6 ha) on the east side of Oak Hill Road. It includes a c. 1850 farmhouse with vernacular Gothic Revival elements, and a carriage barn and dairy barn dating to the same time. Most of the remaining buildings are from the 20th century.

The farm was established about 1850 by Hiram and Charlotte Murray, the house built for them by her father, George Whitney. The couple primarily raised sheep, but had a significant side business producing butter and cheese. In 1871 Jarius David Isham purchased the Murray property, adding it to a small parcel he had previously purchased. Since then, several generations have worked the land principally as a dairy operation. In 2002, David Isham donated a conservation easement to the Vermont Land Trust, providing for the property's preservation as a farm.

== See also ==
- National Register of Historic Places listings in Chittenden County, Vermont
