= William Fitzgerald Block =

- U.S. National Register of Historic Places
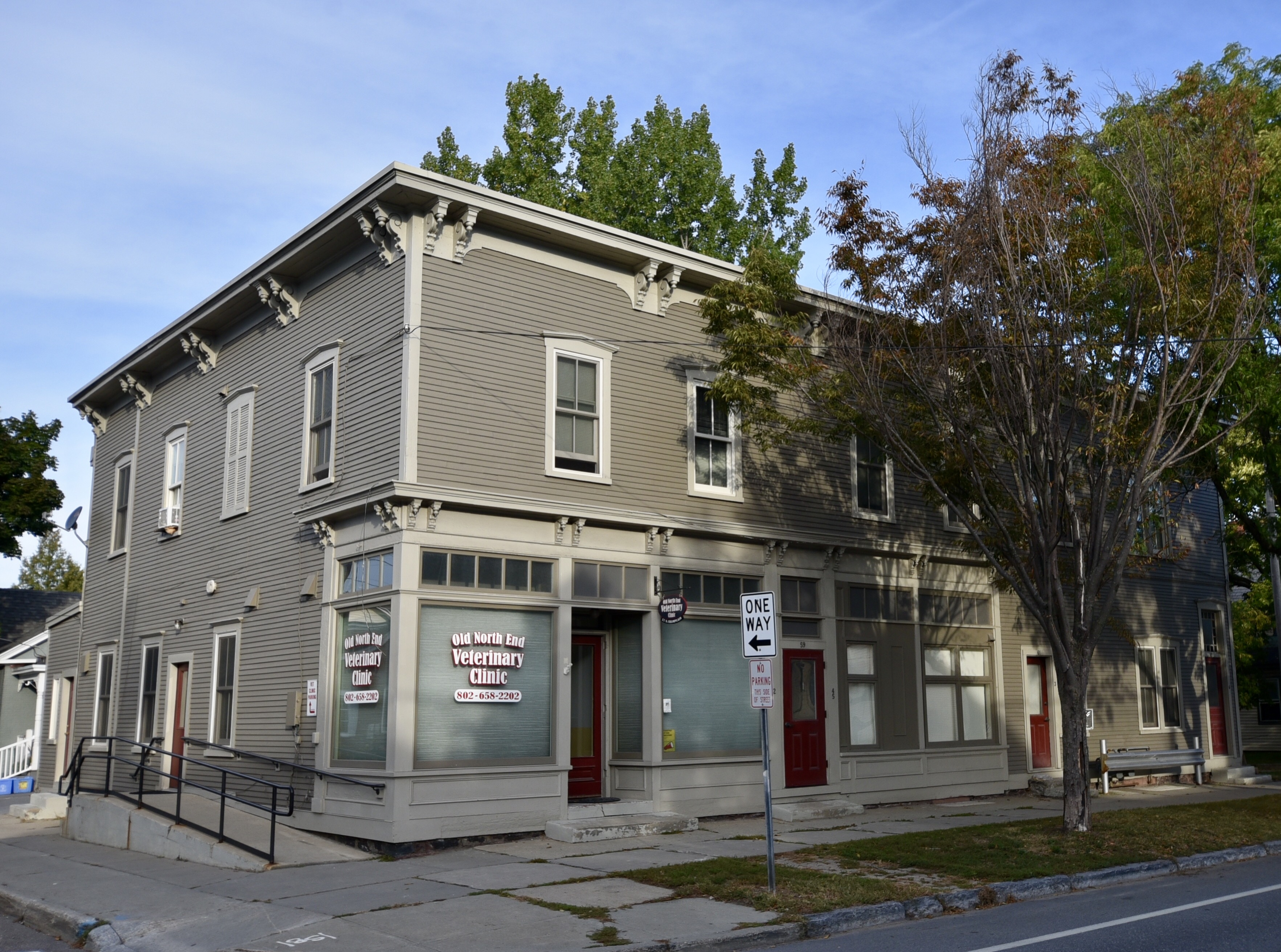

- Location within Vermont Location within the United States
- Location: 57-63 N. Champlain St. Burlington, Vermont
- Coordinates: 44°28′56″N 73°13′4″W
- Built: 1887
- Architectural style: Italianate
- NRHP reference No.: 12000293
- Added to NRHP: May 1, 2012

The William Fitzgerald Block is a historic mixed-use commercial and residential building at 57-63 North Champlain Street in Burlington, Vermont. Built about 1887, it is a well-preserved example of a period neighborhood store with residences above. It was listed on the National Register of Historic Places in 2012.

== Description and history ==
The William Fitzgerald Block stands in Burlingtons' Old North End neighborhood, at the northwest corner of North Champlain Street and Sherman Street. It faces North Champlain Street, a major north-bound thoroughfare through the neighborhood. It is a two-story wood frame structure, with a flat roof and clapboarded exterior. Its Italianate features include a projecting cornice decorated with elaborate paired brackets, a simpler bracketed cornice over the first-floor storefronts, and peaked sills above the second-story windows. The front facade is six bays wide, housing a storefront in southern four bays. There are four doors, one recessed into the storefront, and two of other three providing access to the upper floors; the fourth provides access to a ground-floor apartment built out of former retail space at the north end.

The block was built about 1887, by William and Mary Fitzgerald, who operated a neighborhood store and lived in the northernmost residential unit. The area had seen an influx of workers for Burlington's wood products industries, and the area in the immediate vicinity developed as an enclave of Irish immigrants. The store went through a number of changes in ownership and size, sometimes only occupying the corner section of the commercial space.

== See also ==
- National Register of Historic Places listings in Chittenden County, Vermont
