= House at 44 Front Street =

Historic house in Vermont, United States

- U.S. National Register of Historic Places
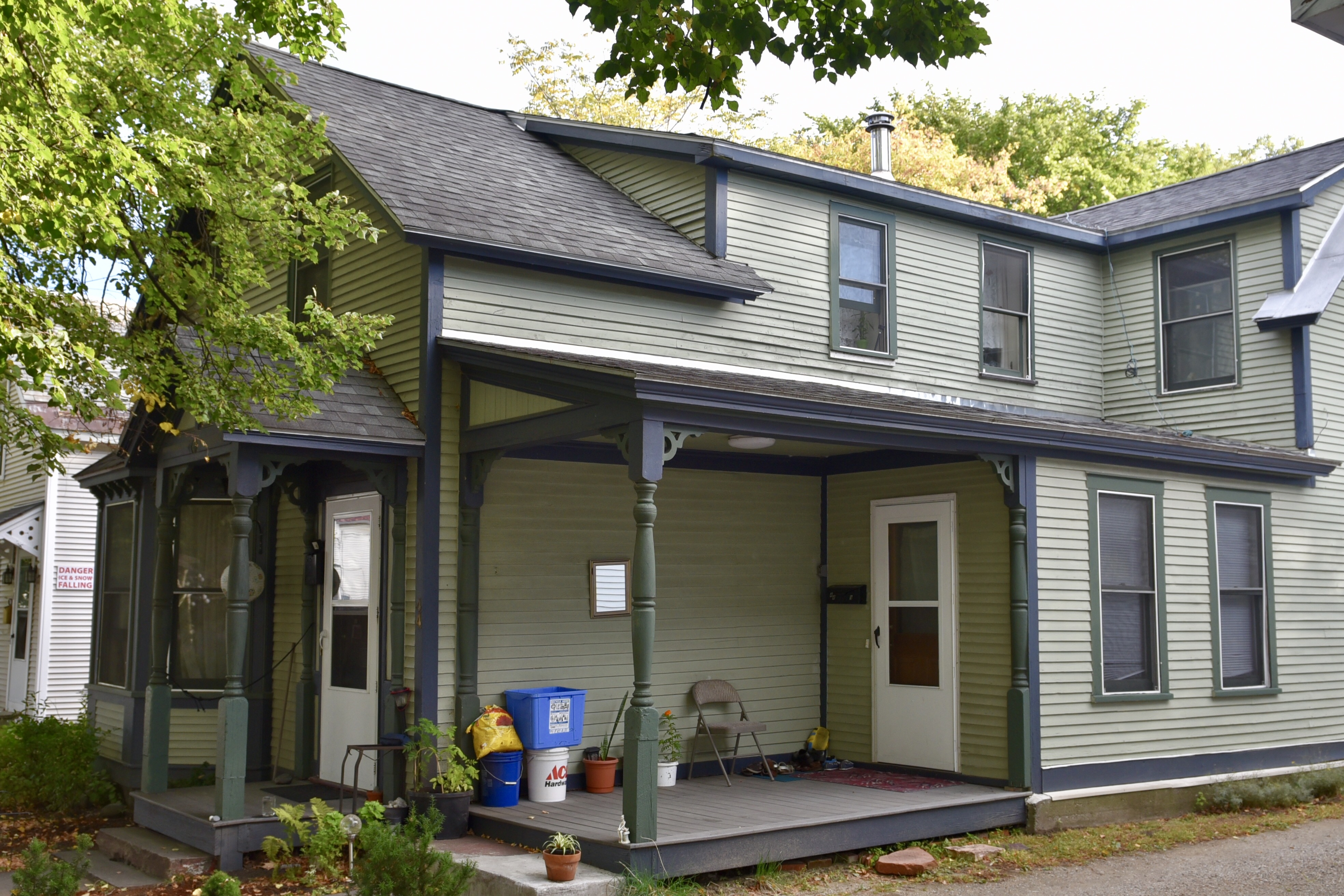

- Location within Vermont Location within the United States
- Location: 42-44 Front St., Burlington, Vermont
- Coordinates: 44°28′59″N 73°13′15″W
- Area: less than one acre
- Built: 1892
- Architectural style: Queen Anne
- MPS: Burlington, Vermont MPS
- NRHP reference No.: 08000997
- Added to NRHP: October 16, 2008

44 Front Street in Burlington, Vermont is a well-preserved vernacular Queen Anne Revival house. Built about 1860 and significantly altered in 1892, it is representative of two periods of the city's growth in the 19th century. It was listed on the National Register of Historic Places in 2008.

== Description and history ==
44 Front Street stands on the east side of Front Street, a short north–south street just north of Battery Park in Burlington's Old North End neighborhood. It is a two-story wood-frame structure, with an L-shaped footprint and a cross-gabled roof. It is finished in wooden clapboards and rests on a stone foundation. The front facade is two bays wide, with one entrance in the right-hand bay, sheltered by a gabled porch with turned posts and Victorian brackets. The left bay is a projecting polygonal window bay on the ground floor; the second floor windows are regular sash, extending up into the gable end. A second entrance is located in a right-side porch set in the crook of the L, with similar posts and brackets.

The house was built about 1860, when the area was known as "Glassville" for the large number of residents who worked at the nearby Champlain Glass Company. The house was given its present shape by Joseph Cota, a worker for the Central Vermont Railroad. Cota needed more space for his large family, and also updated it with modest elements of the then-fashionable Queen Anne styling. It was divided into a two-family in the early 1900s, and the property had as many as four units, some of which were located in auxiliary buildings to the rear (since removed). The house presently has three residential units.

== See also ==
- National Register of Historic Places listings in Chittenden County, Vermont
