= Honey Hollow Camp =

- U.S. National Register of Historic Places
- U.S. Historic district
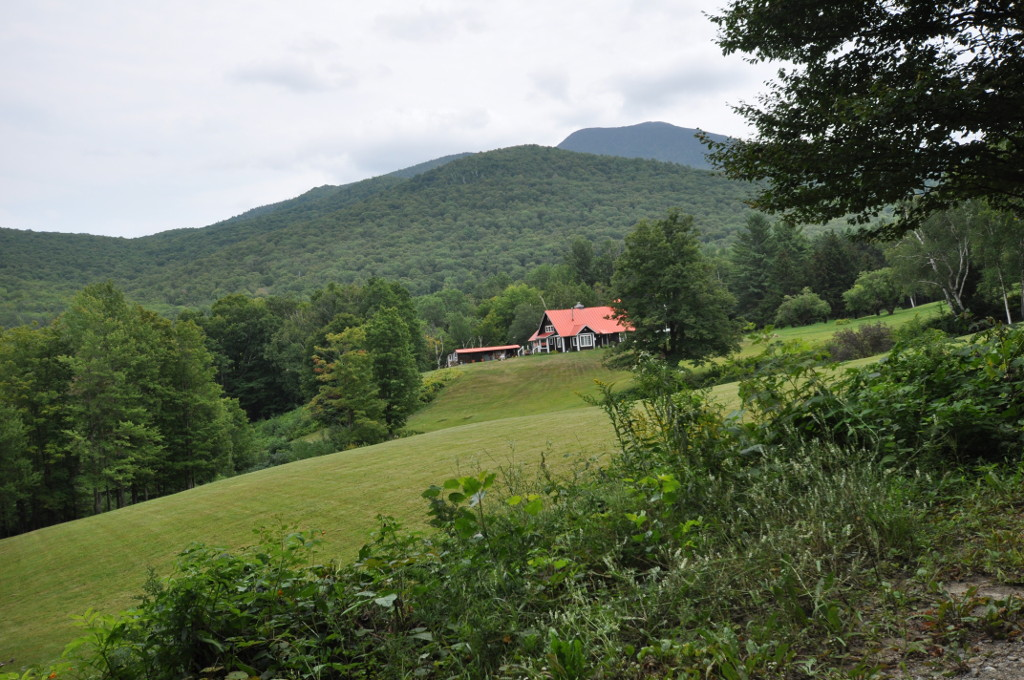

- Location within Vermont Location within the United States
- Location: Honey Hollow Rd., Bolton, Vermont
- Coordinates: 44°21′4″N 72°55′5″W
- Area: 53 acres (21 ha)
- Built: 1940
- Architect: Newton, Louis S.; Breen, Thomas
- NRHP reference No.: 94001512
- Added to NRHP: December 29, 1994

Honey Hollow Camp is a privately owned historic farm and retreat property on Honey Hollow Road in Bolton, Vermont. The property, originally marginal farmland, was developed as a wartime retreat during World War II. It was listed on the National Register of Historic Places in 1994. It is a seasonal residential dwelling and not open to the general public.

== Description and history ==
Honey Hollow Camp is located in a remote rural area of southwestern Bolton, on the northwestern slope of Camels Hump, Vermont's fourth-highest mountain. It is set in the valley created by Preston Brook, on a terrace overlooking the brook. The property is 53 acres (21 ha), of which about 10 acres (4.0 ha) are open fields on either side of Honey Hollow Road, with the balance in woodland. The historic developed features of the property consist of a wood-frame cabin with attached garage, a generator shed, and woodshed. The cabin is finished in vertical board siding recovered from a 19th-century barn which was demolished at the time of the cabin's construction; some of the barn's timbers were also used in the cabin framing.

The Honey Hollow area had been a thriving small farm community, with numerous farms, a sawmill, and a school, but fell into decline in the early 20th century, many of its farms abandoned and reverting to woodland. In 1940, the Honey Hollow farm property was purchased by Carl and Edith Wurm of New York City, who sought a remote country retreat that they thought would be safe from bombing during World War II. The cabin was designed by Louis S. Newton, a prominent Burlington architect, and was built in 1941. The Wurms retained ownership of the camp, sharing it with friends and family until his death in the 1960s. In the 1970s, it was acquired by the Wooden family and underwent some alteration and restoration, mainly to the landscaping to retain the property's views.

== See also ==
- National Register of Historic Places listings in Chittenden County, Vermont
