= Saltus Grocery Store =

- U.S. National Register of Historic Places
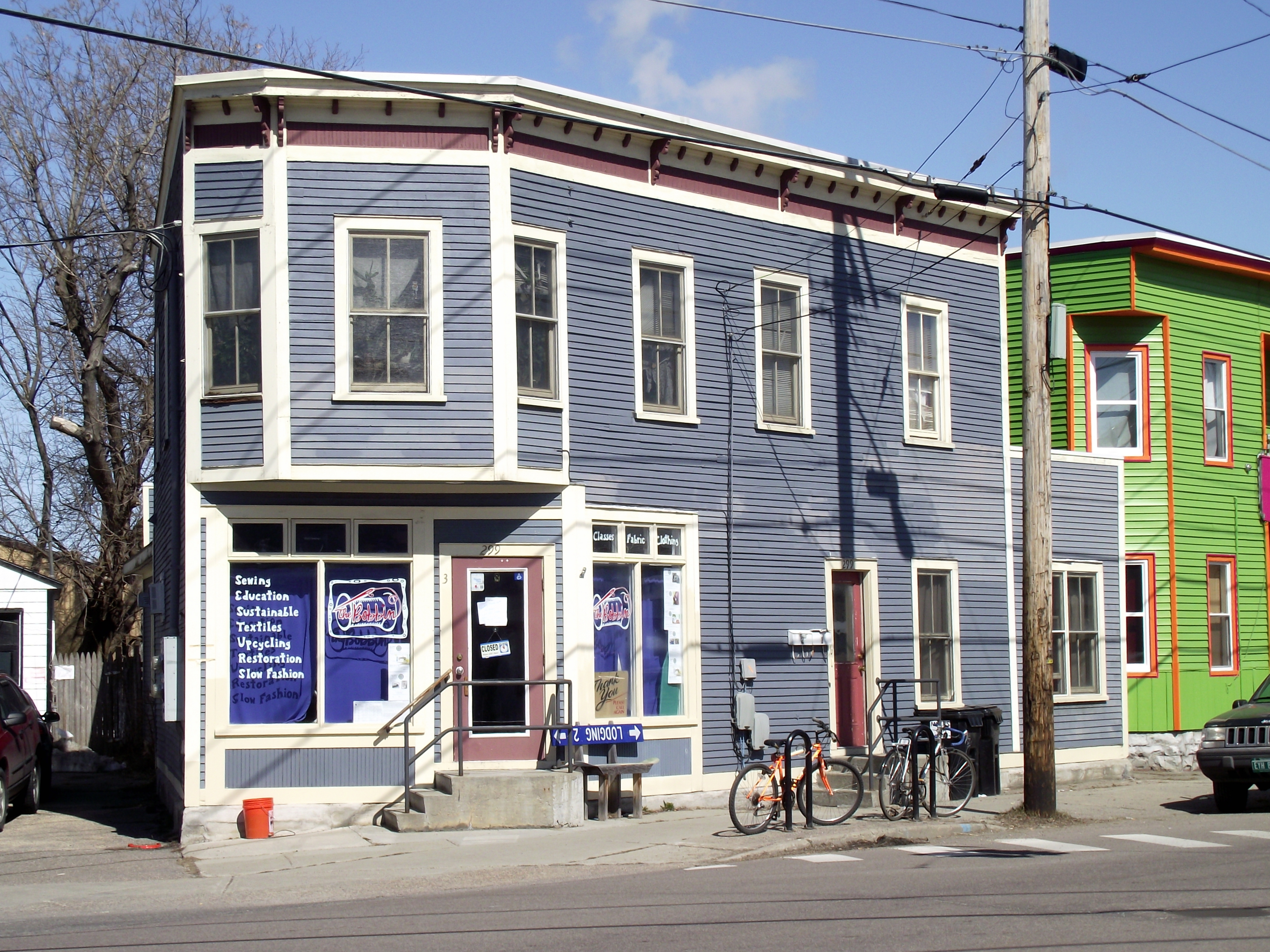

- Location within Vermont Location within the United States
- Location: 299-301 N. Winooski Ave., Burlington, Vermont
- Coordinates: 44°29′18″N 73°12′28″W
- Area: less than one acre
- Built: 1897
- Architectural style: Italianate
- MPS: Burlington, Vermont MPS
- NRHP reference No.: 01001238
- Added to NRHP: November 19, 2001

The Saltus Grocery Store is a historic mixed-use commercial and residential building at 299-301 North Winooski Street in Burlington, Vermont. Built in 1897, it is a well-preserved example of a neighborhood store of the period. It was listed on the National Register of Historic Places in 2001.

== Description and history ==
The Saltus Grocery Store is located in Burlington's Old North End neighborhood, at the northern corner of North Winooski Avenue and Archibald Street. It is a two-story wood-frame building, triangular in shape, with a flat roof and clapboarded exterior. The storefront entrance is set on a short facade facing Archibald Street, flanked on the left side of that facade by a display window, and also by a display window on the right side facade facing North Winooski. A polygonal bay projects on the second floor of this short facade. A residential unit entrance is located on the North Winooski facade, which extends to include a single-story ell. The upstairs has always historically had an apartment, and a second has been carved out of previously commercial space in the rear of the ground floor.

The store was built in 1897, during a period in which the Old North End was undergoing significant growth, including large numbers of immigrants drawn to the area's industries for jobs. It is fairly typical of small neighborhood groceries built in that time, but it is one of a small number that survive. The grocery was first operated by Frank Saltus. The rear space, now residential, housed such businesses as a barber, jeweler, and confectioner, during that area's commercial use, which ended about 1960.

== See also ==
- National Register of Historic Places listings in Chittenden County, Vermont
