= Martin M. Bates Farmstead =

- U.S. National Register of Historic Places
- U.S. Historic district
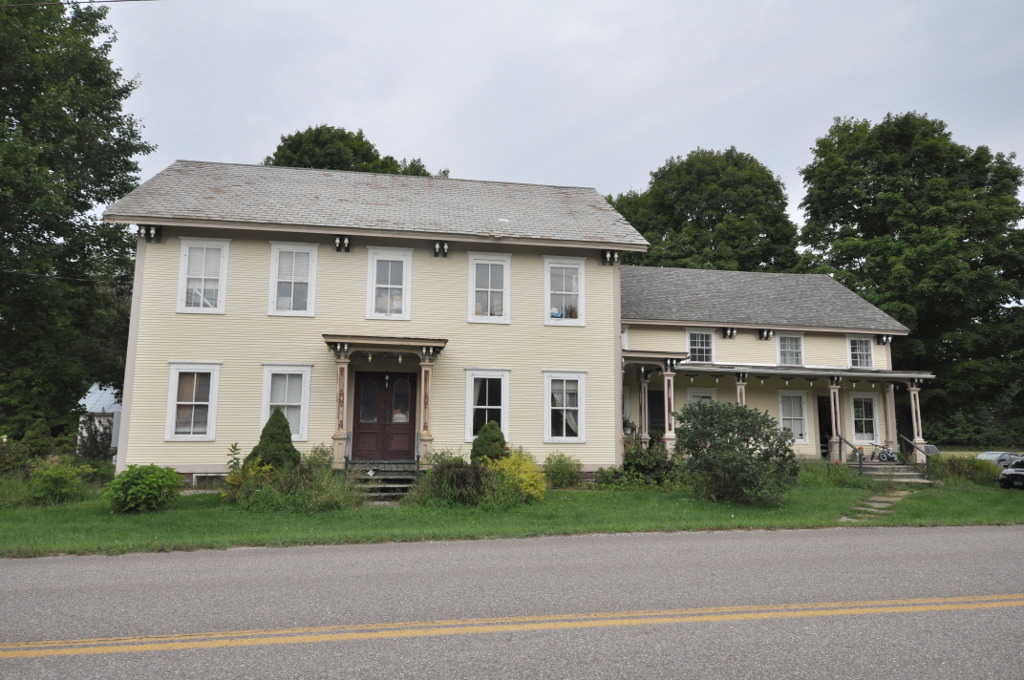

- Location within Vermont Location within the United States
- Location: Huntington Rd. N of Huntington, Richmond, Vermont
- Coordinates: 44°21′57″N 72°59′48″W
- Area: 45 acres (18 ha)
- Built: 1883
- Built by: Conway, T.W.
- Architectural style: Italianate, Ground level stable barn
- MPS: Agricultural Resources of Vermont MPS
- NRHP reference No.: 91001676
- Added to NRHP: November 21, 1991

The Martin M. Bates Farmstead is a historic farm property on Huntington Road in Richmond, Vermont. Farmed since the 1790s, the property is now a well-preserved example of a mid-19th century dairy farm, with a fine Italianate farmhouse. The property was listed on the National Register of Historic Places in 1991.

== Description and history ==
The Bates Farmstead is located in a rural area of southern Richmond, on 45 acres (18 ha) straddling Huntington Road south of its junction with Hillview Road. The area on either side of the road are open fields, which give way to wooded hills behind. The farm complex is also divided by the road, with the house and a chicken house on the northeast side and a large barn and icehouse on the opposite side. The farmhouse is a 2 1/2-story wood-frame structure, with a side-gable roof and ells extending to the right side and rear. It has elaborate Italianate stylistic elements, including paired brackets in the eaves and porches supported by paneled posts. The southeast ell, the oldest portion of the house, retains features original to its construction in the 1820s.

The property was acquired by Solomon Bates in 1793, who probably began farming it not long after. None of its early buildings survive; the house wing was probably built in the 1820s by Solomon's son Elihu. The main block of the house dates to the 1850s, and the large barn complex to the 1890s. The house underwent a major restyling about 1880 by Martin Bates, under whose ownership the farm reached its greatest extent, more than 350 acres (140 ha). The farm remained in Bates family ownership until 1986, with no new buildings added after 1930. The property remains a fine example of a late 19th-century dairy operation.

== See also ==
- National Register of Historic Places listings in Chittenden County, Vermont
