= Stannard House =

Historic house in Vermont, United States

- U.S. National Register of Historic Places
- Location within Vermont Location within the United States
- Location: 3 George St., Burlington, Vermont
- Coordinates: 44°28′50″N 73°12′54.5″W
- Area: less than one acre
- Built: 1850
- Architectural style: Greek Revival
- NRHP reference No.: 100003416
- Added to NRHP: February 4, 2019

The Stannard House is a historic house at 3 George Street in Burlington, Vermont. Built about 1850, it is a good local example of Greek Revival architecture executed in brick. It was listed on the National Register of Historic Places in 2019. The building is now in mixed commercial-residential use.

== Description and history ==
The Stannard House is located on the north side of downtown Burlington, at the northwest corner of George and Pearl Streets. It is a 2 1/2-story brick building, with a gabled roof. Its main facade is four bays wide, with the bays asymmetrically placed around a centered entrance. The entrance is set in a recess, with a columned entablature and full-length sidelight windows. A two-story brick wing, also four bays in length, extends along George Street, recessed from the main block facade.

The house was built in 1849-50 by Doctor Ashbel Pitkin, who lived here and also operated his medical practice here. It remained in use as a medical practice until about 1860, after which it became an owner-occupied boarding house. The house was briefly home to American Civil War general George Stannard between 1871 and 1873, and became known as the Stannard House as a result. Stannard made no significant alterations to the house, and was forced to sell it as a result of accounting problems related to his government service. It was converted into apartments in the 1950s. The building is one of the few in the immediate area to survive a major urban renewal project in the 2000s.

== See also ==
- National Register of Historic Places listings in Chittenden County, Vermont
