= Charles R. Palmer House =

Historic house in Vermont, United States

- U.S. National Register of Historic Places
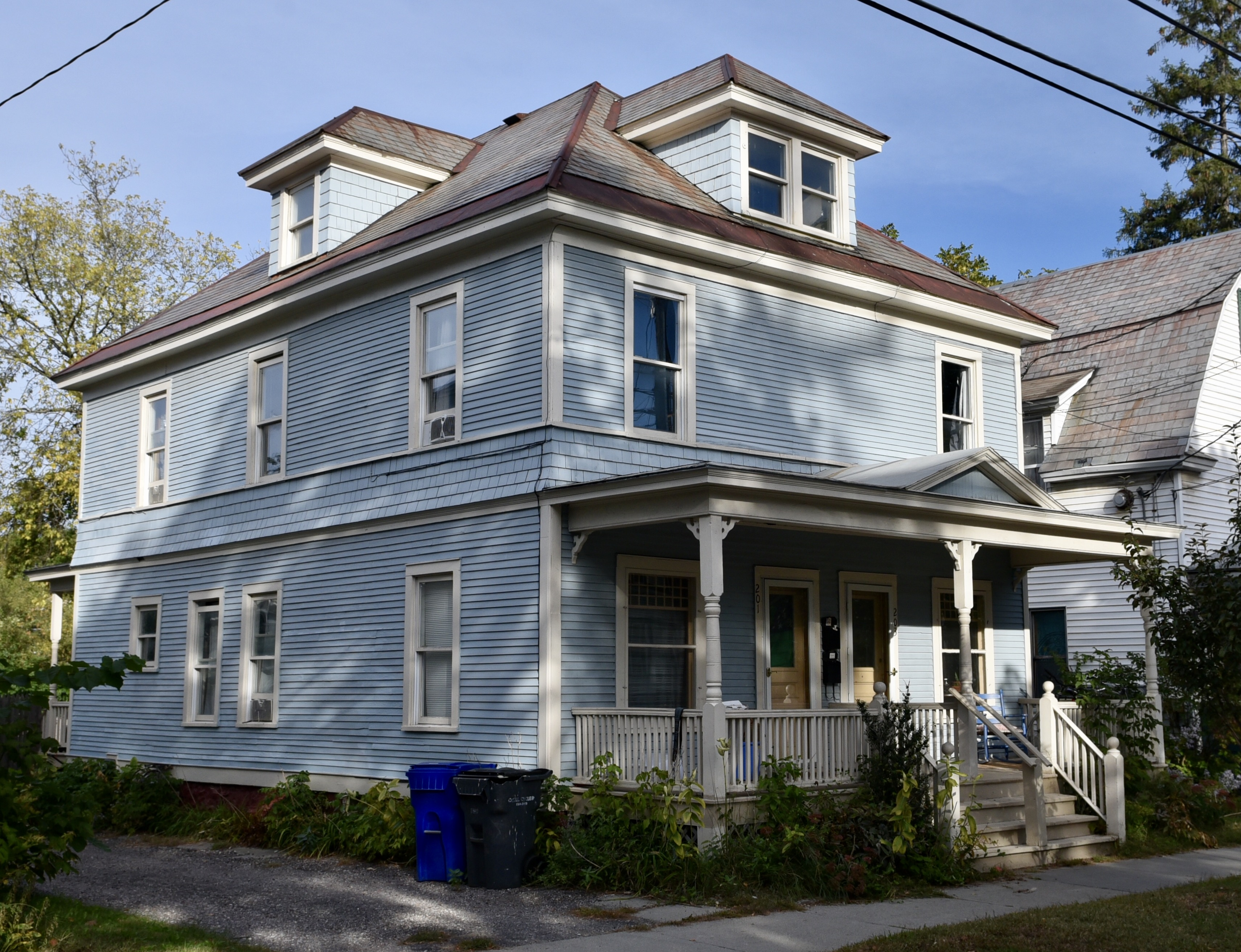

- Location within Vermont Location within the United States
- Location: 201 and 203 N. Willard St., Burlington, Vermont
- Coordinates: 44°29′12″N 73°12′22″W
- Area: less than one acre
- Built: 1911
- Architectural style: American Foursquare
- NRHP reference No.: 05000947
- Added to NRHP: August 30, 2005

The Charles R. Palmer House is a historic house at 201-203 North Willard Street in Burlington, Vermont. Built about 1911, it is a well-preserved example of an American Foursquare duplex in the city's Old North End neighborhood. It was listed on the National Register of Historic Places in 2005.

== Description and history ==
The Charles R. Palmer House stands in a mixed residential area on the eastern side of Burlington's Old North End neighborhood, on the west side of North Willard Street between Russell and Pomeroy Streets. It is a two-story wood-frame structure, with a hip roof pierced by hip-roof dormers. Its exterior exhibits a variety of stylistic architectural elements, including bands of wooden shingles between the first and second floor, which are otherwise finished in wooden clapboards. It has a single-story porch extending across the front, with turned posts and decorative brackets. It is covered by a flat roof with a shallow gable at the center above the stairs. The interior is divided into mirror-image residential units, with L-shaped staircases that retain original balustrades.

The house was built about 1911, and is kit home manufactured by the North American Construction Company (known better by its later name, The Aladdin Company) of Bay City, Michigan. The company was a pioneer in the idea of mail-order homes, and this is an example of its common "Devon" duplex. Burlington was at the time experiencing rapid growth, and a number of similar houses line Willard Street and other nearby streets.

== See also ==
- National Register of Historic Places listings in Chittenden County, Vermont
