= North Street Historic District (Burlington, Vermont) =

Historic district in Vermont, United States

- U.S. National Register of Historic Places
- U.S. Historic district
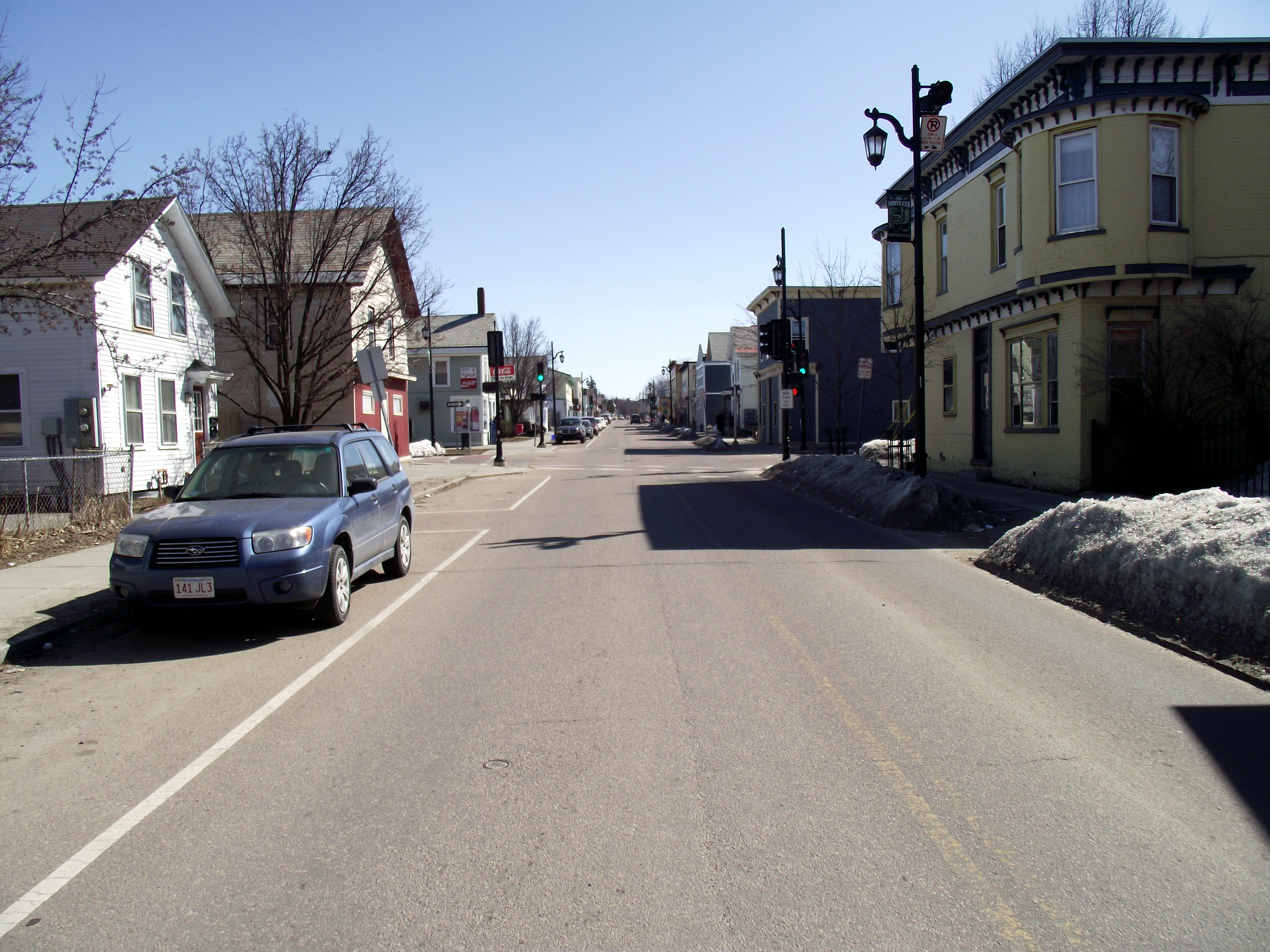

- Location within Vermont Location within the United States
- Location: Roughly along North St., from North Ave. to N. Winooski Ave., Burlington, Vermont
- Coordinates: 44°29′3″N 73°13′1″W
- Area: 24 acres (9.7 ha)
- Built: 1823
- Architectural style: Italianate, Queen Anne
- NRHP reference No.: 01001364
- Added to NRHP: December 21, 2001

The North Street Historic District encompasses the traditional commercial area serving the residential Old North End neighborhood of Burlington, Vermont. It extends for ten blocks along North Street between North Avenue and North Winooski Avenue, and has served as the neighborhood's commercial center for over 150 years. It was listed on the National Register of Historic Places in 2001.

== Description and history ==
Burlington's Old North End neighborhood arose as a residential area in the first half of the 19th century, and grew rapidly in the second half. Its growth was fueled by Burlington's prominent lumber industry, which drew large numbers of immigrants to the city. North Street, running east from the waterfront of Lake Champlain, became the neighborhoods principal commercial thoroughfare. Although it started primarily residential, commercial development had begun by 1853. Early immigrants were primarily French Canadian and Irish, with later waves of European Jewish immigrants arriving in the late 19th through early 20th centuries. These arrivals lived in the tenement houses that populated the area, with some moving out when their financial condition made it possible, while others stayed and developed closely knit ethnic enclaves.

The district covers 24 acres (9.7 ha) and includes 70 buildings, most of which face North Street. A small number of buildings include on the district face the cross streets of North Avenue, North Winooski Avenue, Elmwood Avenue, North Champlain Street, and Intervale Avenue. Most of the buildings are either commercial or mixed-use commercial-residential, one to two stories in height. The largest number were built between 1870 and 1890, when the area was at its height of development, but buildings as old as 1830 and as recent as 1949 retain some historic character. The buildings are in a mix of architectural styles, generally in vernacular interpretations of styles popular at their time of construction.

== See also ==
- National Register of Historic Places listings in Chittenden County, Vermont
