= National Register of Historic Places listings in Chittenden County, Vermont =

Location of Chittenden County in Vermont

Chittenden County, Vermont, United States, has 113 properties and districts listed on the National Register of Historic Places, including three National Historic Landmarks. One property was once listed, but has been removed. Latitude and longitude coordinates are provided for many National Register properties and districts; these locations may be seen together in a map.

This National Park Service list is complete through NPS recent listings posted September 12, 2025.

Contents: Counties in Vermont
Addison - Bennington - Caledonia - Chittenden - Essex - Franklin - Grand Isle - Lamoille - Orange - Orleans - Rutland - Washington - Windham - Windsor

== Current listings ==
	Name on the Register	Image	Date listed	Location	City or town	Description
1	Ethan Allen Homestead	Ethan Allen Homestead	July 24, 1986 (#86002265)	Off Van Patten Parkway; 44°30′29″N 73°13′48″W	Burlington	
2	Apartment Building at 27 and 31 Peru Street and 29 Johnson Street	Apartment Building at 27 and 31 Peru Street and 29 Johnson Street	January 22, 2014 (#13001119)	27 and 31 Peru Street and 29 Johnson Street; 44°28′57″N 73°12′59″W	Burlington	
3	Martin M. Bates Farmstead	Martin M. Bates Farmstead	November 21, 1991 (#91001676)	Huntington Rd. north of Huntington; 44°21′57″N 72°59′48″W	Richmond	
4	Battery Street Historic District	Battery Street Historic District	November 2, 1977 (#77000098)	Roughly bounded by Lake Champlain and Main, Maple, and St. Paul Sts. (both sides); also roughly bounded by Browns Court and King, Adams, and South Union Sts.; also 214-240 Pine St., excluding 235; 44°28′29″N 73°13′05″W	Burlington	Second and third sets of boundaries represents boundary increases of June 28, 1984 and July 24, 2014 respectively
5	Wilson Alwyn "Snowflake" Bentley House	Wilson Alwyn "Snowflake" Bentley House	July 3, 1980 (#80004501)	Southeast of Jericho on Nashville Rd. 44°27′01″N 72°55′57″W	Jericho	
6	Buell Street-Bradley Street Historic District	Buell Street-Bradley Street Historic District	November 13, 1995 (#95001260)	2-71 Bradley St., 24-125 Buell St., 16-75 Orchard Terr., 9-96 S. Union St., 11-87 Hungerford Terr. 44°28′45″N 73°12′31″W	Burlington	
7	Burlington Bay Horse Ferry		December 15, 1993 (#93001384)	In Burlington Bay, between Lone Rock Point and the Burlington breakwater 44°29′07″N 73°14′35″W	Burlington	Shipwreck of a horse-powered ferry
8	Burlington Breakwater	Burlington Breakwater	June 6, 2003 (#02000711)	Burlington Harbor; 44°28′32″N 73°13′33″W	Burlington	Built to calm the waters of Lake Champlain against Burlington harbor.
9	Burlington Montgomery Ward Building	Burlington Montgomery Ward Building	May 30, 1991 (#91000673)	52-54 Church St. 44°28′44″N 73°12′46″W	Burlington	
10	Burlington Traction Company	Burlington Traction Company	October 7, 2004 (#04001133)	662 Riverside Ave. and 321-343 N. Winooski Ave. 44°29′29″N 73°12′22″W	Burlington	First housing streetcars, then buses, now several small businesses and apartments.
11	Roswell Butler House	Roswell Butler House	November 8, 2001 (#01001226)	6 Carmichael St. 44°30′34″N 73°05′05″W	Essex	
12	Carnegie Building of the Fletcher Free Library	Carnegie Building of the Fletcher Free Library	August 18, 1976 (#76000138)	College St. and S. Winooski Ave. 44°28′37″N 73°12′39″W	Burlington	
13	Champlain School	Champlain School	December 10, 1982 (#82001761)	817 Pine St. 44°27′25″N 73°12′55″W	Burlington	Former elementary school, now apartments (with addition in rear)
14	Lewis Chapin Homestead		December 9, 2022 (#100008479)	22 Barber Farm Road; 44°27′52″N 72°58′39″W	Jericho	
15	Charlotte Center Historic District	Charlotte Center Historic District	July 19, 1984 (#84003460)	Church Hill and Hinesburg Rds. 44°18′52″N 73°14′23″W	Charlotte	
16	Giles Chittenden Farmstead		October 29, 1993 (#93001160)	Governor Chittenden Rd., northeast of Williston village center 44°26′59″N 73°02′43″W	Williston	
17	Martin Chittenden House	Martin Chittenden House	January 9, 1978 (#78000230)	West of Jericho on Vermont Route 117; 44°27′28″N 73°01′13″W	Jericho	
18	Church Street Historic District	Church Street Historic District	July 29, 2010 (#09000915)	Generally the Church St. corridor, along with flanking blocks of Bank, Cherry, College, and Main Streets; 44°28′40″N 73°12′45″W	Burlington	
19	City Hall Park Historic District	City Hall Park Historic District	June 9, 1983 (#83003206)	Church, College, Main, and St. Paul Sts. 44°28′35″N 73°12′49″W	Burlington	
20	Clemmons Farm		August 11, 2025 (#100012087)	2158 Greenbush Road; 44°19′13″N 73°15′17″W	Charlotte	
21	Converse Hall	Converse Hall	June 2, 2021 (#100006655)	75 Colchester Ave. (UVM campus); 44°28′42″N 73°11′40″W	Burlington	
22	District No. 5 Schoolhouse	District No. 5 Schoolhouse	April 5, 2018 (#100002311)	32 Pleasant Valley Rd. 44°30′32″N 72°53′44″W	Underhill	
23	Downtown Essex Junction Commercial Historic District	Downtown Essex Junction Commercial Historic District	November 1, 2004 (#04001216)	3-17 and 8-12 Main St., 2-28 Railroad Ave., and 2 Railroad St. 44°29′36″N 73°06′35″W	Essex Junction	
24	Dumas Tenements		September 18, 2012 (#11000928)	114 W. Allen & 114 W. Canal Sts. 44°29′28″N 73°11′29″W	Winooski	
25	Duplex at 22-26 Johnson Street		May 1, 2012 (#12000292)	22-26 Johnson St. 44°28′56″N 73°12′58″W	Burlington	
26	Duplex at 73-75 Sherman Street		December 31, 2013 (#13001029)	73-75 Sherman St. 44°28′55″N 73°13′07″W	Burlington	
27	Ethan Allen Engine Company No. 4	Ethan Allen Engine Company No. 4	April 16, 1971 (#71000056)	135 Church St. 44°28′36″N 73°12′46″W	Burlington	
28	First Baptist Church	First Baptist Church	March 2, 2001 (#01000217)	81 St. Paul St. 44°28′40″N 73°12′52″W	Burlington	
29	First Methodist Church of Burlington	First Methodist Church of Burlington	October 5, 1978 (#78000231)	S. Winooski Ave. 44°28′43″N 73°12′38″W	Burlington	
30	William Fitzgerald Block	William Fitzgerald Block	May 1, 2012 (#12000293)	57-63 N. Champlain St. 44°28′56″N 73°13′04″W	Burlington	
31	Follett House	Follett House	October 30, 1972 (#72000091)	63 College St. 44°28′36″N 73°13′04″W	Burlington	
32	Fort Ethan Allen Historic District	Fort Ethan Allen Historic District	September 14, 1995 (#95001102)	Junction of Vermont Route 15 and Barnes Avenue; 44°30′19″N 73°08′56″W	Colchester and Essex	
33	Galusha House	Galusha House	October 10, 1978 (#78000232)	South of Jericho; 44°30′09″N 72°59′38″W	Jericho	Home of Truman Galusha, son of Jonas Galusha.
34	GENERAL BUTLER (shipwreck)		October 22, 1998 (#98001269)	Burlington Bay; 44°28′19″N 73°13′42″W	Burlington	
35	Grasse Mount	Grasse Mount	April 11, 1973 (#73000193)	411 Main St. 44°28′36″N 73°12′13″W	Burlington	
36	Gray Rocks	Gray Rocks	December 27, 1996 (#96001534)	U.S. Route 2, near its junction with Interstate 89; 44°24′05″N 72°58′29″W	Richmond	
37	Head of Church Street Historic District	Head of Church Street Historic District	July 15, 1974 (#74000207)	Pearl and Church Sts. 44°28′51″N 73°12′48″W	Burlington	
38	Hinesburg Town Forest	Hinesburg Town Forest	June 7, 2016 (#15001037)	Hayden Hill Rd. 44°19′47″N 73°02′42″W	Hinesburg	
39	Holmes Creek Covered Bridge	Holmes Creek Covered Bridge	September 6, 1974 (#74000326)	Northwest of Charlotte over Holmes Creek; 44°20′00″N 73°16′55″W	Charlotte	
40	Honey Hollow Camp	Honey Hollow Camp	December 29, 1994 (#94001512)	Honey Hollow Rd. 44°21′02″N 72°55′06″W	Bolton	
41	House at 44 Front Street	House at 44 Front Street	October 16, 2008 (#08000997)	42-44 Front St. 44°29′00″N 73°13′13″W	Burlington	
42	Howard Mortuary Chapel	Howard Mortuary Chapel	October 21, 1999 (#99001272)	455 North Ave. 44°29′36″N 73°13′49″W	Burlington	
43	Huntington Lower Village Church	Huntington Lower Village Church	August 23, 1984 (#84003463)	2156 Main Rd. 44°19′35″N 72°59′21″W	Huntington	Now houses the local library.
44	Jericho Center Historic District	Jericho Center Historic District	May 26, 1983 (#83003207)	Brown's Trace, Bolger Hill and Varney Rds. 44°28′13″N 72°58′20″W	Jericho	
45	Jericho Village Historic District	Jericho Village Historic District	November 5, 1992 (#92001533)	Vermont Route 15, Plains Rd., Mill St., and Old Pump Rd. 44°30′19″N 72°59′45″W	Jericho	
46	Dan Johnson Farmstead		November 4, 1993 (#93001178)	Junction of U.S. Route 2 and Johnson Ln. 44°25′50″N 73°03′22″W	Williston	
47	Jonesville Academy	Jonesville Academy	November 2, 1982 (#82001762)	South of Jonesville at Cochran and Waterbury Rds. 44°22′53″N 72°56′18″W	Jonesville	
48	Martin L. Kelsey House	Martin L. Kelsey House	February 24, 1983 (#83003208)	43 Elmwood Ave; 44°28′54″N 73°12′50″W	Burlington	
49	Lakeside Development	Lakeside Development	April 12, 1982 (#82001699)	Lakeside, Central, Conger, Wright, and Harrison Aves. 44°27′35″N 73°13′15″W	Burlington	
50	LeClair Avenue Historic District		April 2, 2012 (#11000831)	6, 7, 8, 11, 14 LeClair Ave., 11-13, 12, 20 North St. 44°29′39″N 73°11′23″W	Winooski	
51	LeFerriere House	LeFerriere House	August 8, 2008 (#07000499)	171-173 Intervale Ave. 44°29′21″N 73°12′37″W	Burlington	Misspelled "LeFarriere" in the register listing.
52	Mad River Glen Ski Area Historic District	Mad River Glen Ski Area Historic District	July 5, 2012 (#12000409)	VT 17 (McCullough Turnpike); 44°12′07″N 72°55′02″W	Buels Gore	Mostly in Fayston in Washington County
53	Main Street-College Street Historic District	Main Street-College Street Historic District	October 13, 1988 (#88001850)	Roughly bounded by College, S. Williams and Main Sts., and S. Winooski Ave. 44°28′44″N 73°12′22″W	Burlington	
54	McNeil Homestead	McNeil Homestead	June 17, 1982 (#82001700)	Wings Point Rd. 44°18′12″N 73°18′05″W	Charlotte	
55	Methodist Episcopal Church of Winooski	Methodist Episcopal Church of Winooski	March 2, 2001 (#01000216)	24 W Allen St. 44°29′28″N 73°11′16″W	Winooski	
56	Mintzer House	Mintzer House	August 8, 2008 (#07000498)	175-177 Intervale Ave. 44°29′26″N 73°12′37″W	Burlington	
57	Moquin's Bakery	Moquin's Bakery	June 27, 1997 (#97000645)	78 Rose St. 44°29′13″N 73°13′00″W	Burlington	
58	Moran Municipal Generation Station	Moran Municipal Generation Station	December 17, 2010 (#10001041)	475 Lake St. 44°28′53″N 73°13′24″W	Burlington	
59	Mount Philo State Park	Mount Philo State Park	November 29, 2001 (#01001286)	5425 Mount Philo Rd. 44°16′40″N 73°12′40″W	Charlotte	
60	Murray-Isham Farm	Murray-Isham Farm	December 7, 1992 (#92001668)	3515 Oak Hill Rd. (Town Highway 1); 44°23′34″N 73°05′47″W	Williston	
61	Normand House	Normand House	August 8, 2008 (#07000497)	163-165, 165 rear Intervale Ave. 44°29′25″N 73°12′38″W	Burlington	
62	North Street Historic District	North Street Historic District	December 21, 2001 (#01001364)	Roughly along North St., from North Ave. to N. Winooski Ave. 44°29′03″N 73°13′01″W	Burlington	
63	O.J. WALKER (shipwreck)		October 22, 1998 (#98001270)	Burlington Bay; 44°28′44″N 73°14′27″W	Burlington	
64	Old Ohavi Zedek Synagogue	Old Ohavi Zedek Synagogue	January 31, 1978 (#78000233)	Archibald and Hyde Sts. 44°29′18″N 73°12′26″W	Burlington	
65	Old Red Mill and Mill House	Old Red Mill and Mill House	July 31, 1972 (#72000113)	Vermont Route 15; 44°30′17″N 73°00′00″W	Jericho	
66	Old Stone House	Old Stone House	May 8, 1973 (#73000271)	73 E. Allen St. 44°29′29″N 73°11′00″W	Winooski	
67	Charles R. Palmer House	Charles R. Palmer House	August 30, 2005 (#05000947)	201 and 203 N. Willard St. 44°29′12″N 73°12′22″W	Burlington	
68	Pearl Street Historic District	Pearl Street Historic District	November 1, 1984 (#84000416)	Roughly 184 to 415 Pearl St., Orchard Terr., and Winooski Ave. 44°28′50″N 73°12′29″W	Burlington	
69	Cicero Goddard Peck House	Cicero Goddard Peck House	November 10, 2010 (#10000890)	18 Mechanicsville Rd. 44°19′55″N 73°06′36″W	Hinesburg	
70	PHOENIX (Shipwreck)		November 5, 1998 (#98001268)	Colchester Shoal, Colchester Reef; 44°33′11″N 73°19′52″W	Colchester	
71	Pine Street Industrial Historic District		October 16, 2017 (#100001751)	Pine St. 44°28′16″N 73°12′55″W	Burlington	
72	Porter Screen Company	Porter Screen Company	November 15, 1979 (#79000219)	110 E. Spring St. 44°29′37″N 73°10′54″W	Winooski	
73	Preston-Lafreniere Farm	Preston-Lafreniere Farm	February 5, 1999 (#99000138)	Junction of Duxbury Rd. and Honey Hollow Rd. 44°22′29″N 72°54′33″W	Bolton	
74	Proctor Maple Research Farm		September 13, 1999 (#99001050)	UVM Rd. 44°31′37″N 72°51′57″W	Underhill	
75	Quinlan's Covered Bridge	Quinlan's Covered Bridge	September 10, 1974 (#74000208)	South of East Charlotte over Lewis Creek; 44°16′35″N 73°11′04″W	East Charlotte	
76	Redstone Historic District	Redstone Historic District	November 14, 1991 (#91001614)	S. Prospect St. 44°28′12″N 73°11′54″W	Burlington	
77	Remington-Williamson Farm	Remington-Williamson Farm	November 19, 2001 (#01001239)	4282 Main Rd. 44°18′00″N 72°58′14″W	Huntington	
78	Richmond Congregational Church	Richmond Congregational Church	March 29, 2001 (#01000326)	Junction of Bridge and Church St. 44°24′14″N 72°59′46″W	Richmond	
79	Richmond Underwear Company Building	Richmond Underwear Company Building	May 7, 1992 (#92000465)	Millet St. 44°24′24″N 72°59′38″W	Richmond	
80	John B. Robarge Duplex	John B. Robarge Duplex	August 6, 2005 (#05000805)	58-60 N. Champlain St. 44°29′03″N 73°13′02″W	Burlington	
81	Roberge-Desautels Apartment House	Roberge-Desautels Apartment House	January 22, 2014 (#13001120)	54 N. Champlain St. 44°28′55″N 73°13′02″W	Burlington	
82	Daniel Webster Robinson House	Daniel Webster Robinson House	April 22, 1982 (#82001701)	384 and 388 Main St. 44°28′35″N 73°12′13″W	Burlington	Shingle Style transitional with elements of Georgian, Queen Anne, and Colonial (revival) styles; now a fraternity house.
83	Round Church	Round Church	June 20, 1974 (#74000355)	Bridge St. and Cochran Rd. 44°23′56″N 72°59′58″W	Richmond	Built in 1812–1813, a rare, well-preserved example of a sixteen-sided meetinghouse
84	Lucy Ruggles House	Lucy Ruggles House	December 16, 2005 (#05001421)	262 S. Prospect St. 44°28′23″N 73°12′00″W	Burlington	
85	Saltus Grocery Store	Saltus Grocery Store	November 19, 2001 (#01001238)	299-301 N. Winooski Ave. 44°29′18″N 73°12′28″W	Burlington	
86	Sand Bar State Park	Sand Bar State Park	February 14, 2002 (#02000028)	1215 U.S. Route 2; 44°37′37″N 73°14′27″W	Milton	
87	Seguin Covered Bridge	Seguin Covered Bridge	September 6, 1974 (#74000209)	Roscoe Road over Lewis Creek; 44°17′20″N 73°09′03″W	East Charlotte	Misspelled "Sequin" in the National Register.
88	Shelburne Falls Historic District		March 27, 2023 (#100007500)	Falls Rd., Irish Hill Rd., Bacon Dr. 44°22′15″N 73°13′01″W	Shelburne	
89	Shelburne Farms	Shelburne Farms	August 11, 1980 (#80000330)	Off U.S. Route 7; 44°23′37″N 73°14′53″W	Shelburne	Created in 1886 by Dr. William Seward Webb and Eliza Osgood Vanderbilt Webb as a model agricultural estate.
90	Shelburne Village Historic District	Shelburne Village Historic District	July 27, 1990 (#90001055)	Area north and south of the junction of U.S. Route 7, Harbor Rd. and Falls Rd., including the area south and east of the LaPlatte River and U.S. Route 7; 44°22′51″N 73°13′36″W	Shelburne	
91	Sloop Island Canal Boat		June 27, 2022 (#100007843)	L. Champlain; 44°18′45″N 73°18′29″W	Charlotte	
92	South Union Street Historic District	South Union Street Historic District	October 31, 1988 (#88001946)	S. Union St. between Howard and Main; 44°28′16″N 73°12′30″W	Burlington	
93	South Willard Street Historic District	South Willard Street Historic District	November 3, 1988 (#88002226)	S. Willard St. 44°28′21″N 73°12′23″W	Burlington	
94	Stannard House		February 4, 2019 (#100003416)	3 George St. 44°28′50″N 73°12′54″W	Burlington	
95	Sutton Farm		October 7, 2004 (#04001132)	4592 Dorset St. 44°24′13″N 73°10′41″W	Shelburne	
96	Tavern on Mutton Hill	Tavern on Mutton Hill	December 10, 1982 (#82001763)	Church Hill Rd. 44°19′30″N 73°14′15″W	Charlotte	
97	TICONDEROGA	TICONDEROGA	October 15, 1966 (#66000797)	Shelburne Museum; 44°22′37″N 73°13′53″W	Shelburne	220-foot (67 m) steamboat built in Shelburne, Vermont in 1906.
98	Lee Tracy House	Lee Tracy House	December 22, 1983 (#83004226)	U.S. Route 7; 44°22′54″N 73°13′42″W	Shelburne	
99	U.S. Post Office and Custom House	U.S. Post Office and Custom House	November 21, 1972 (#72000114)	Southeastern corner of Main and Church Sts. 44°28′33″N 73°12′44″W	Burlington	
100	Underhill State Park	Underhill State Park	June 21, 2002 (#02000665)	352 Mountain Rd. 44°31′34″N 72°49′58″W	Underhill	
101	University Green Historic District	University Green Historic District	April 14, 1975 (#75000139)	University of Vermont campus 44°28′39″N 73°12′02″W	Burlington	
102	Edward Wells House	Edward Wells House	October 3, 1979 (#79000220)	61 Summit St. 44°28′28″N 73°12′11″W	Burlington	
103	Wells-Jackson Carriage House Complex	Wells-Jackson Carriage House Complex	December 10, 1982 (#82001764)	192-194 Jackson Court and 370 Maple St. 44°28′30″N 73°12′17″W	Burlington	
104	Wells-Richardson Complex	Wells-Richardson Complex	March 5, 1979 (#79000221)	Main, Pine, College, and St. Paul Sts. 44°28′35″N 73°12′54″W	Burlington	
105	West Milton Bridge	West Milton Bridge	September 8, 1992 (#92001173)	Town Highway 40 over the Lamoille River; 44°37′56″N 73°10′18″W	Milton	
106	M. S. Whitcomb Farm	M. S. Whitcomb Farm	September 30, 1993 (#93001010)	U.S. Route 2; 44°23′45″N 72°57′25″W	Richmond	
107	Williston Congregational Church	Williston Congregational Church	May 17, 1973 (#73000194)	Center of Williston Village on US 2; 44°26′20″N 73°04′23″W	Williston	
108	Williston Village Historic District	Williston Village Historic District	December 19, 1979 (#79000222)	U.S. Route 2, specifically over Allen Brook; 44°26′16″N 73°04′14″W	Williston	Allen Brook location represents a boundary increase of September 4, 1992
109	Winooski Archeological Site		January 5, 1978 (#78000234)	Address Restricted	Winooski	
110	Winooski Block	Winooski Block	November 20, 1974 (#74000210)	E. Allen and Main Sts. 44°29′30″N 73°11′11″W	Winooski	
111	Winooski Falls Mill District	Winooski Falls Mill District	February 9, 1979 (#79000223)	Northern bank of the Winooski River to Center and Canal Sts., southern bank to Barrett St.; also 485-497 Colchester Ave., 5-21 Mill St., and 8-32 Barrett St., Burlington; also 110 W. Canal St. 44°29′20″N 73°11′15″W	Winooski	Second and third sets of boundaries represent boundary increases of September 30, 1993 and November 12, 2009 respectively
112	Winooski River Bridge	Winooski River Bridge	May 30, 1990 (#90000775)	U.S. Route 2 over the Winooski River; 44°25′24″N 73°01′01″W	Richmond	
113	Winterbotham Estate	Winterbotham Estate	May 12, 1975 (#75000140)	163 S. Willard St. 44°28′33″N 73°12′22″W	Burlington	

== Former listings ==
	Name on the Register	Image	Date listed	Date removed	Location	City or town	Description
1	Chittenden County Courthouse	Chittenden County Courthouse	April 11, 1973 (#73000192)	March 22, 2016	180 Church St. 44°28′02″N 73°12′44″W	Burlington	Destroyed by fire on February 8, 1982.

== See also ==
- List of National Historic Landmarks in Vermont
- National Register of Historic Places listings in Vermont
