= Roberge-Desautels Apartment House =

Historic residential building in Vermont, United States

- Robarge-Desautels Apartment House
- U.S. National Register of Historic Places
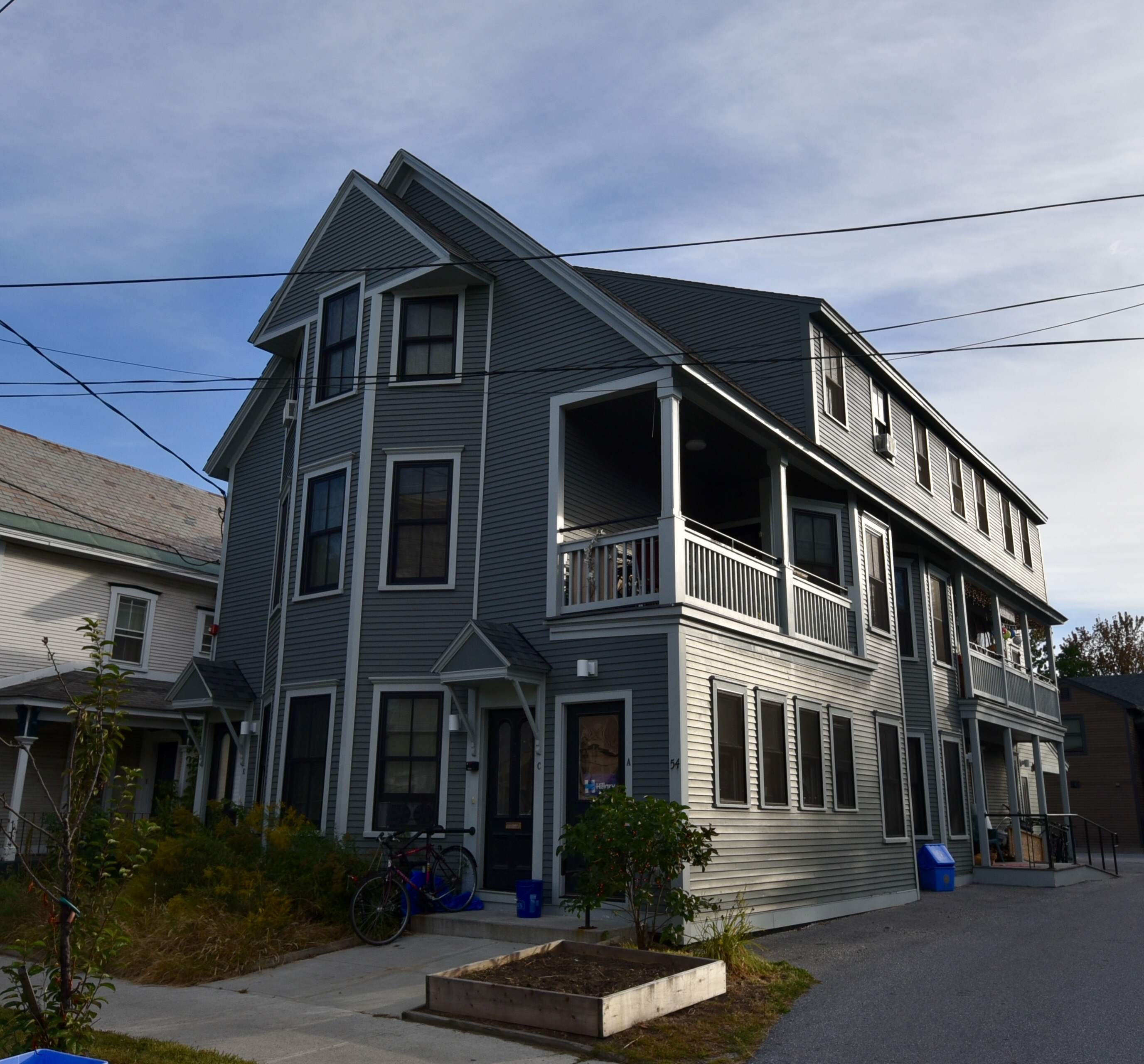

- Location within Vermont Location within the United States
- Location: 54 N. Champlain St., Burlington, Vermont
- Coordinates: 44°28′55″N 73°13′2″W
- Area: less than one acre
- Built: 1900
- Architectural style: Queen Anne
- NRHP reference No.: 13001120
- Added to NRHP: January 22, 2014

The Robarge-Desautels Apartment House is a historic multi-unit residence at 54 North Champlain Street in Burlington, Vermont. Built about 1900, it is a well-preserved example of a Queen Anne style apartment house. It was listed on the National Register of Historic Places in 2014.

== Description and history ==
The Robarge-Desautels Apartment House stands on the east side of North Champlain Street in Burlington's Old North End neighborhood, a short way south of its junction with North Street. It is a long rectangular 2 1/2-story wood-frame structure, with a gabled roof augmented by long shed-roof dormers to provide a full living space in the attic level. Its vernacular Queen Anne features include gabled bracketed hoods over two of its entrances, which flank a central projecting polygonal bay. That bay is capped by a gable that projects beyond the corners of the bay. Along the right side there are two porches, one set above the entrance to the third-floor unit, the other two stories at the rear. In between is a polygonal bay.

The apartment house was built about 1900, during a building boom caused by Burlington's rapidly increasing demand for workers in its burgeoning lumber-related industries. It was built by John Robarge, a blacksmith who built several properties on North Champlain and nearby streets in an area that had formerly been a private estate. He used the building as a rental property, and in 1921 his widow sold it to Wilfred and Clara Desautels, who occupied one of its units for thirty years.

== See also ==
- National Register of Historic Places listings in Chittenden County, Vermont
