= Pine Street Industrial Historic District =

Historic district in Vermont, United States

- U.S. National Register of Historic Places
- U.S. Historic district
- Location within Vermont Location within the United States
- Location: Pine Street area in southern Burlington, Vermont
- Coordinates: 44°28′16″N 73°12′55″W
- Area: 92.6 acres (37.5 ha)
- NRHP reference No.: 100001751
- Added to NRHP: October 16, 2017

The Pine Street Industrial Historic District encompasses a collection of maritime industrial buildings and archaeological sites in southern Burlington, Vermont. The district includes buildings across nearly 100 years, encompassing the development and decline of the area, which served as a major railroad and shipping terminus from the mid-19th to mid-20th centuries. It was listed on the National Register of Historic Places in 1984.

== Description and history ==
The city of Burlington was founded in the late 18th century, and was from an early date an important lumber shipment and processing point. The southern part of its waterfront on Lake Champlain began to see industrial development following the arrival of the railroad in 1849, and the construction of a barge canal twenty years later. The land west of Pine Street and south of Maple Street was in part created by filling in marshland, and became a focal point for a large number of wood-processing industries.

The historic district includes resources associated with Burlington's maritime trade, railroad trade, and timber processing industries. Buildings along Pine Street and nearby streets associated with the industries are typically vernacular brick or frame buildings, few rising above two stories in height. The principal railroad-related building that still survives from the period is a roundhouse built 1916–18; many of the extant buildings associated with the railyard in the area are not of historic significance. Maritime resources include shipwrecks located just off the waterfront.

== See also ==
- National Register of Historic Places listings in Chittenden County, Vermont
