= John B. Robarge Duplex =

Historic house in Vermont, United States

- U.S. National Register of Historic Places
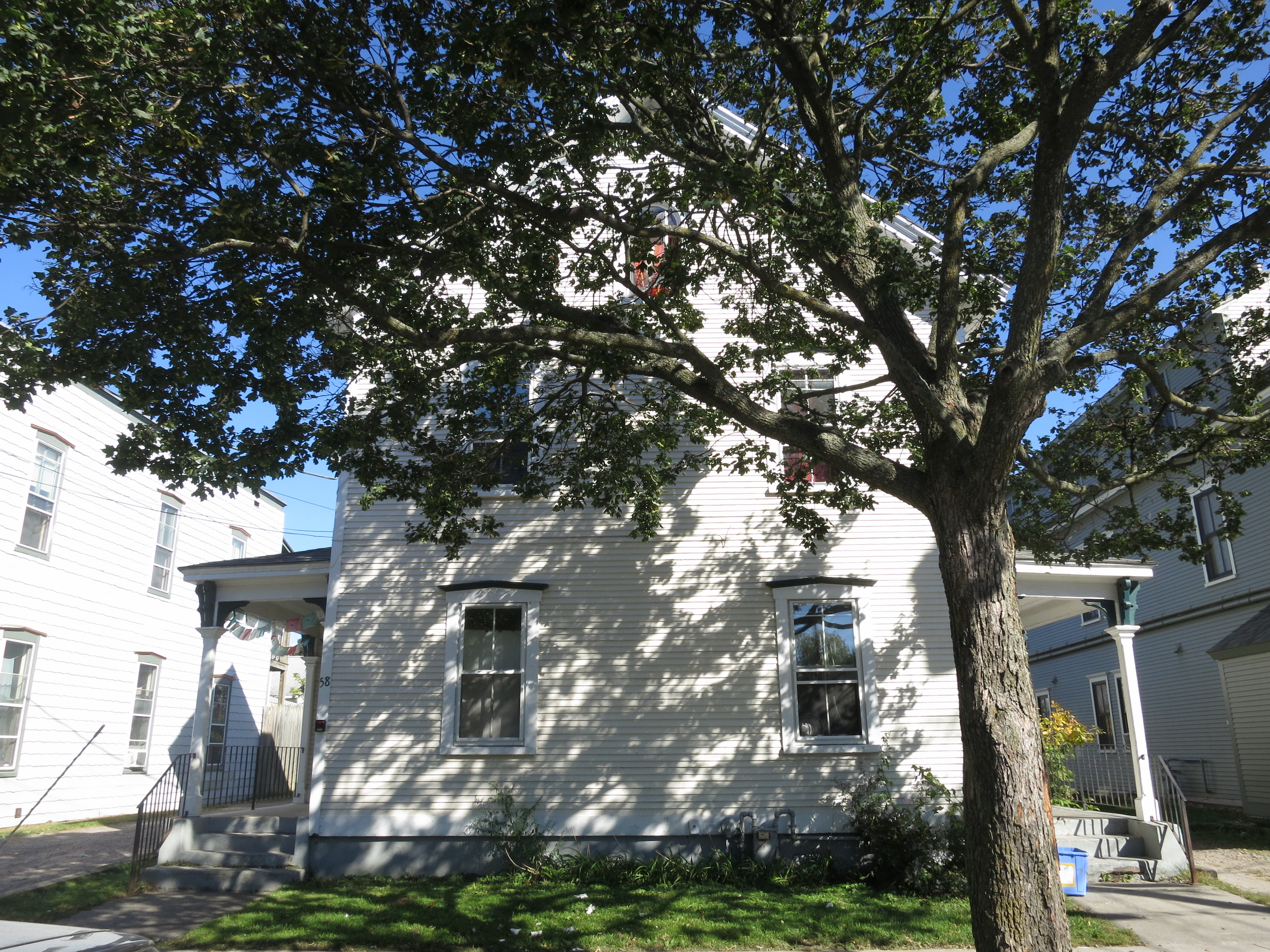

- Location within Vermont Location within the United States
- Location: 58-60 N. Champlain St., Burlington, Vermont
- Coordinates: 44°29′3″N 73°13′2″W
- Area: 0.2 acres (0.081 ha)
- Built: 1878
- Architectural style: Italianate
- NRHP reference No.: 05000805
- Added to NRHP: August 6, 2005

The John B. Robarge Duplex is a historic multi-unit residence at 58-60 North Champlain Street in Burlington, Vermont. Built 1878–79, it is one of the city's few examples of an Italianate two-family house. It was listed on the National Register of Historic Places in 2005.

== Description and history ==
The John B. Robarge Duplex stands on the east side of North Champlain Street in Burlington's Old North End neighborhood, a short way south of its junction with North Street. It is a 2 1/2-story wood-frame structure, with a gabled roof and clapboarded exterior. Its front is symmetrical, with two window bays on each story, and a round-arch window set in the gable. Most windows are rectangular sash, topped by a low-pitch gabled lintel. A cross-gable section projects symmetrical to each side in the rear half of the building, with nearly identical porches set in the front corners. The porches have hip roofs, with supporting posts topped by brackets at the eaves.

The duplex was built c. 1878–1879, and is a particularly refined yet vernacular expression of the Italianate for what is essentially a working-class house. It is one of the city's few known examples of an Italianate style duplex. It was built by John Robarge, a blacksmith who built several properties on North Champlain and nearby streets in an area that had formerly been a private estate. Robarge and later his remarried widow used the house as rental property.

== See also ==
- National Register of Historic Places listings in Chittenden County, Vermont
