= Catamount Outdoor Family Center =

- Giles Chittenden Farmstead
- U.S. National Register of Historic Places
- U.S. Historic district
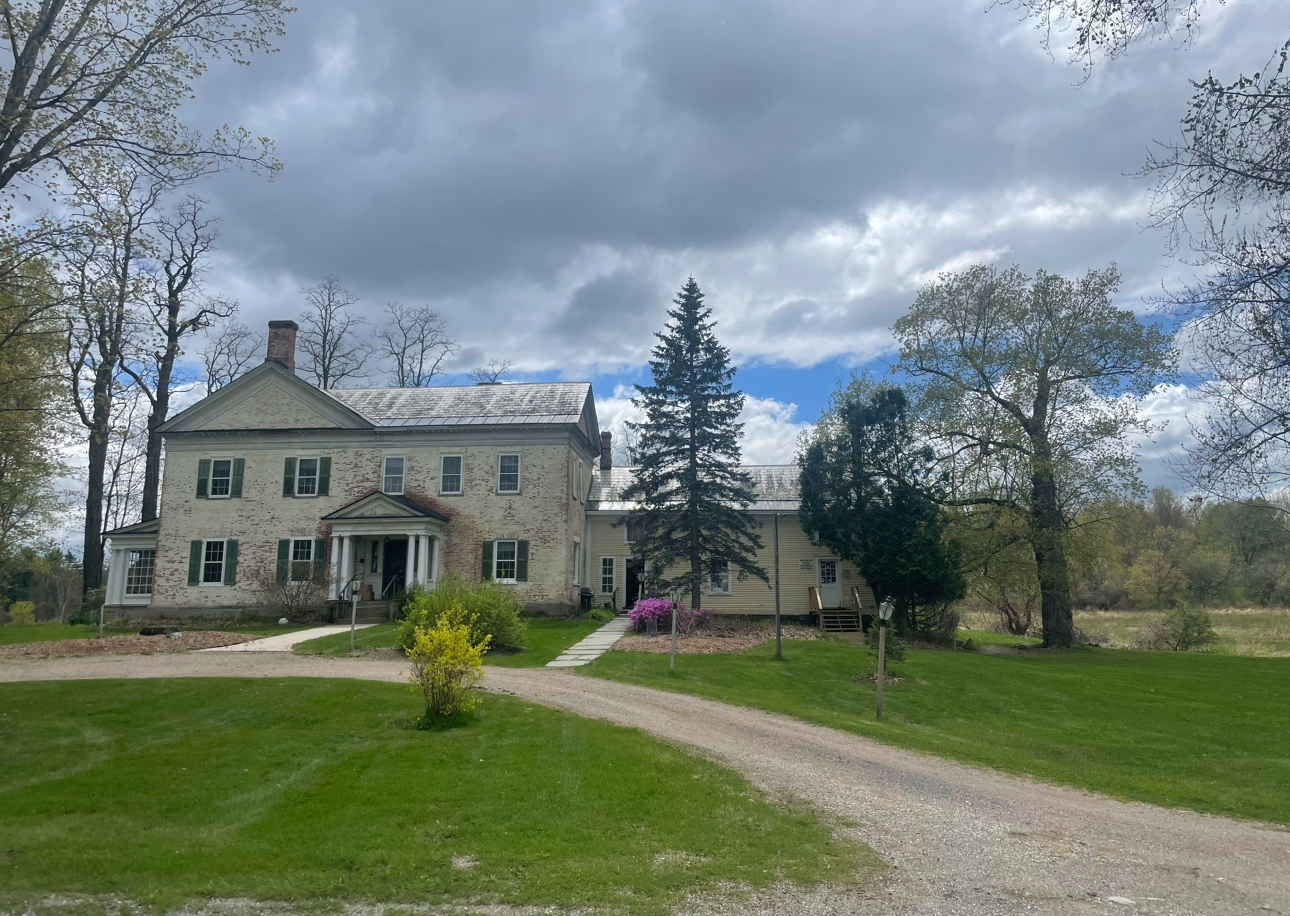
- The Giles Chittenden Farmstead is part of the Family Center

- Location within Vermont Location within the United States
- Location: Governor Chittenden Rd., NE of Williston village center, Williston, Vermont
- Coordinates: 44°26′59″N 73°2′43″W
- Area: 426 acres (172 ha)
- Built: 1796
- Architectural style: Federal, Colonial Revival
- NRHP reference No.: 93001160
- Added to NRHP: October 29, 1993

The Catamount Outdoor Family Center is the non-profit steward of the Catamount Community Forest, a town owned forest on Governor Chittenden Road in Williston, Vermont. The more than 400-acre (160 ha) property includes trails for a variety of outdoor activities, including hiking, biking, snowshoeing, and cross-country skiing. The adjacent property includes Williston's oldest house, built about 1796 by Governor Thomas Chittenden for his son Giles, which is now a private home and was listed on the National Register of Historic Places as the Giles Chittenden Farmstead in 1993.

== Location ==
The Catamount Outdoor Family Center is located in a rural area of northeastern Williston, on either side of Governor Chittenden Road east of North Williston Road. The property is a combination of open fields and woodlands, with the open fields generally closer to the road. A small cluster of buildings is located on the south side of the road, from which a network of trails radiate across the landscape.

== History ==
The Catamount Outdoor Family Center was opened in 1978 by Jim and Lucy McCullough, who owned and ran the organization until a large portion of their land was conserved in 2019, creating the Catamount Community Forest. The architectural highlight of the area is the Giles Chittenden House, a Federal style two-story brick house. It was built about 1796 by Thomas Chittenden the first Governor of Vermont and the first settler of Williston. Chittenden built a house for himself (no longer standing) about 1787, and later built houses for each of his four sons. His son Giles was mainly a farmer, but was entangled in family financial issues that forced him to sell off portions of his land, and left his estate insolvent upon his death in 1819. In addition to the house, the property also includes a 19th-century barn, probably built in mid-century by Charles Miller.

== See also ==
- National Register of Historic Places listings in Chittenden County, Vermont
