= Moquin's Bakery =

- U.S. National Register of Historic Places
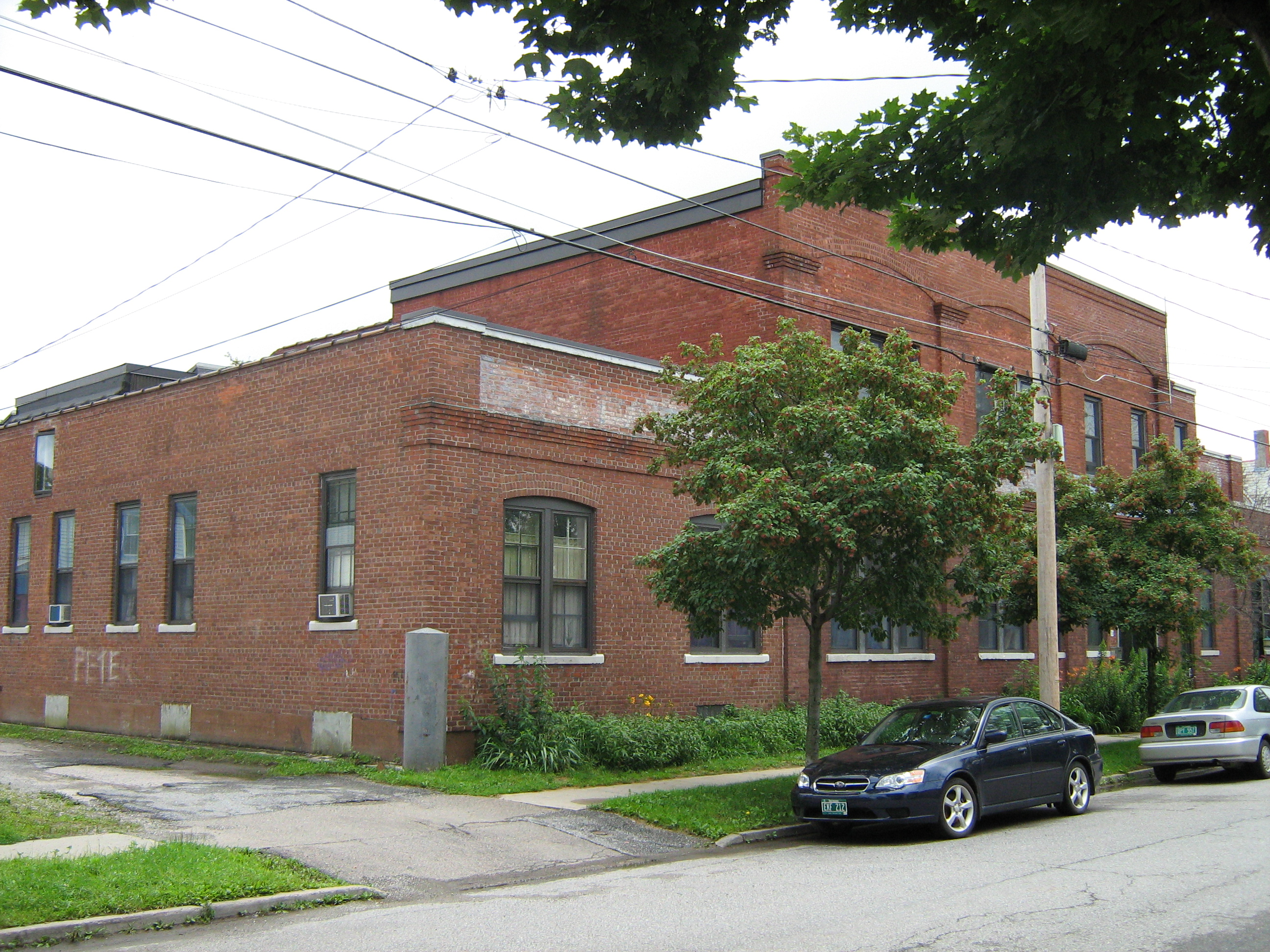

- Location within Vermont Location within the United States
- Location: 78 Rose St., Burlington, Vermont
- Coordinates: 44°29′13″N 73°13′0″W
- Area: less than one acre
- Built: 1930
- Architectural style: Early Commercial
- NRHP reference No.: 97000645
- Added to NRHP: June 27, 1997

Moquin's Bakery, also known locally as the Biscuit Factory and the National Biscuit Company, is a historic former industrial facility at 78 Rose Street in Burlington, Vermont. Built in 1915 by a local bakery, it was acquired and enlarged by the National Biscuit Company (now better known as Nabisco), which operated here until 1969. The building was listed on the National Register of Historic Places in 1997 for its economic and commercial historic significance, and has since then been converted into residences.

== Description and history ==
The former Moquin's Bakery building stands in a predominantly residential area of Burlington's Old North End, on the east side of Rose Street between Cedar Street and Manhattan Drive. It is a large two-story brick building, with single-story extensions on both sides. The main facade is seven bays wide, with the central section having three bays articulated by brick pilasters. The outermost bays consist of paired sash windows, set in segmented-arch openings, above which is a band of brick corbelling. Although it is basically symmetrical, the building has a complex construction history, beginning as a single-story two-bay structure in the center of the structure.

The oldest portion of the building was erected in 1915 by John, Fred and Julius Moquin, and by the 1920s had grown to be a major local economic presence, delivering bread and other bakery products across the state. The Moquin's withdrew from the business in the 1930s, and it eventually merged with the National Biscuit Company. The plant was substantially enlarged about 1940, and had by 1945 achieved most of its present size and scale. It was closed in 1969, and was used for a time as a warehouse before a brief reuse as a bakery in 1982. It has since been adaptively repurposed into residences.

== See also ==
- National Register of Historic Places listings in Chittenden County, Vermont
