= South Union Street Historic District (Burlington, Vermont) =

Historic district in Vermont, United States

- U.S. National Register of Historic Places
- U.S. Historic district
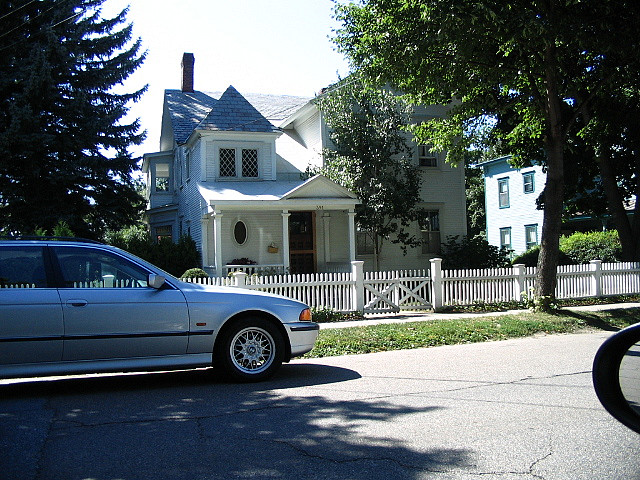
- House on South Union Street

- Location within Vermont Location within the United States
- Location: S. Union St. between Howard and Main, Burlington, Vermont
- Coordinates: 44°28′16″N 73°12′30″W
- Area: 45 acres (18 ha)
- Built: 1835
- Architectural style: Colonial Revival, Late Victorian, Greek Revival
- NRHP reference No.: 88001946
- Added to NRHP: October 31, 1988

The South Union Street Historic District encompasses a historic 19th-century residential neighborhood for the upper middle class in Burlington, Vermont. Developed along South Union Street between Main and Howard Streets, South Union grew between about 1835 and 1938 as a popular area for well-to-do yet middle class Burlingtonians, affording views of Lake Champlain to the west. The architecturally diverse district was listed on the National Register of Historic Places in 1988.

== Description and history ==
Burlington's South Union Street was first laid out early in the city's history, as one of its primary routes to the south. It was at first agrarian, with widely spaced brick houses, a number of which survive. The city's economy developed after the railroad arrived in the 1840s, and the road, set roughly midway between the lowlands along Lake Champlain, and the hill to the east where the University of Vermont campus is located, developed as an area where the newly well-to-do could build good quality homes with views of the lake. Houses are typically oriented toward the west, and set as far east (up the hill) as possible. Those on the east side of South Union, especially those built in the Second Empire and Queen Anne styles, also feature towers to improve the view.

The historic district is essentially linear, extending along South Union between Main and Howard Street. It extends to the sides to include properties on four side streets: Kingsland Terrace, Cliff Street, Bayview Street, and Spruce Street. The district covers 45 acres (18 ha), and has 178 historically significant buildings, all residential. They are in a diversity of styles, but are typically two to two-and-one-half stories in height, and share similarities in size and setting.

== See also ==
- National Register of Historic Places listings in Chittenden County, Vermont
