= Wells-Jackson Carriage House Complex =

- U.S. National Register of Historic Places
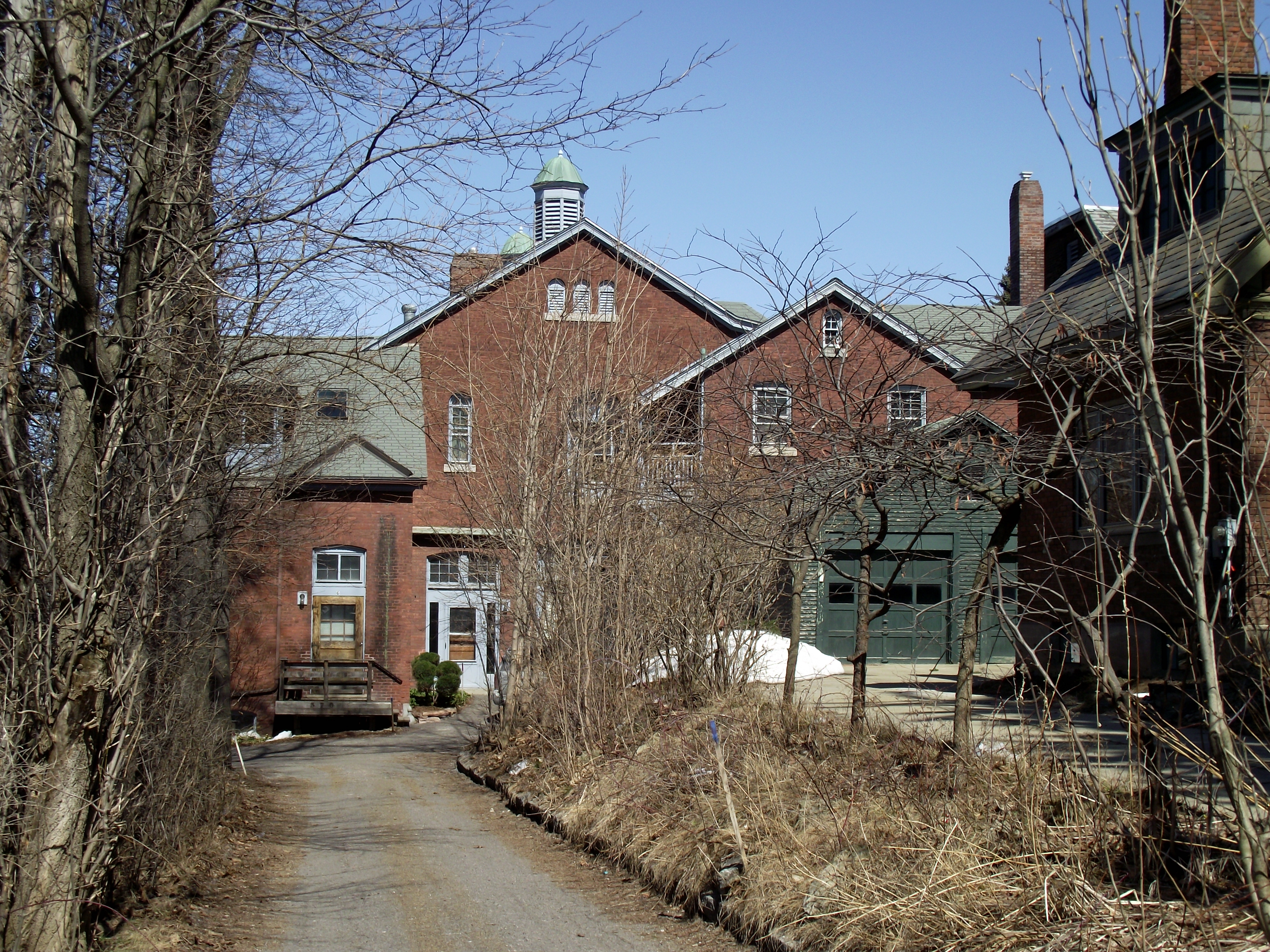

- Location within Vermont Location within the United States
- Location: 192-194 Jackson Court and 370 Maple St., Burlington, Vermont
- Coordinates: 44°28′30″N 73°12′17″W
- Area: 0.4 acres (0.16 ha)
- Built: 1901
- Architectural style: Colonial Revival, Queen Anne
- NRHP reference No.: 82001764
- Added to NRHP: December 10, 1982

The Wells-Jackson Carriage House Complex is a well-preserved complex of estate outbuildings at 192-194 Jackson Court and 370 Maple Street in Burlington, Vermont, United States. Built in 1901 as part of a larger estate, the complex includes a carriage house, tack house, and coachman's quarters of a quality unrivaled in the state. Obsoleted by the advent of the automobile, the buildings have been converted to residential use. They were listed on the National Register of Historic Places in 1982.

== Description and history ==
The former Wells-Jackson Carriage House Complex is located in a residential area between downtown Burlington and the University of Vermont campus, on the south side of Jackson Court, a short, densely built residential side street off South Willard Street. The complex includes three buildings: the wood-frame tack house and coachman's quarters, both set near the street, and the large brick carriage house, which stands behind those two, and is accessed via a drive between them. The tack house and coachman's house both have redstone foundations, and have exteriors finished in a combination of wooden clapboards and shingles in the Queen Anne Victorian style. The carriage house has a 2-1/2 story main block, from which two large wings project. Its main entrance, facing north towards Jackson Court, has a large two-leaf doorway topped by a hayloft entrance in the form of a Palladian window. These are set in a two-story round arch panel with brick quoined borders and a granite keystone. The interior of the carriage barn was, at the time of its construction, fitted with a wide array of modern amenities, including steam heat, electricity, and plumbing.

The complex was built by the widow of William Wells and her son-in-law, Dr. H Nelson Jackson. The family owned an estate whose surviving house is located north of here, but is separated by later infill residential construction. The Wellses had become wealthy in the business of manufacturing patent medicines, and the elaborate amenities (which resulted in horses being stabled in better conditions than some of Burlington's human residents) reflected the family's wish for the highest quality. The buildings represent the final epitome of carriage houses and horse-related outbuildings, which were soon obsoleted by the advent of the automobile. These buildings only saw relatively brief use as their intended function, and the tack house and portions of the carriage house were soon converted to residential use. The remaining portions of the carriage house were converted to residential use later in the 20th century.

== See also ==
- Edward Wells House, built nearby by William Wells' son
- National Register of Historic Places listings in Chittenden County, Vermont
