= Buell Street–Bradley Street Historic District =

Historic district in Vermont, United States

- U.S. National Register of Historic Places
- U.S. Historic district
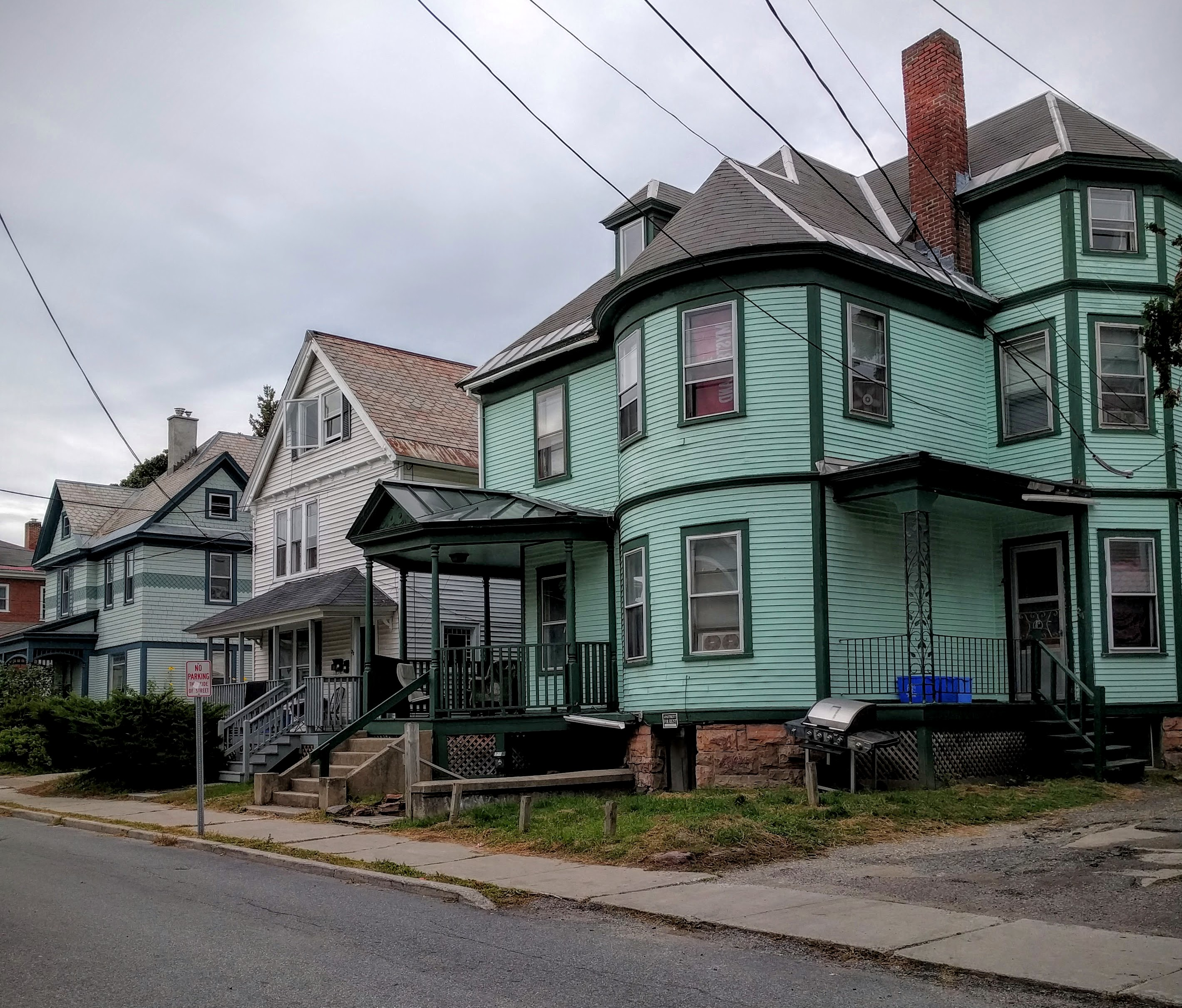

- Location within Vermont Location within the United States
- Location: 2-71 Bradley St., 24-125 Buell St., 16-75 Orchard Terr., 9-96 S. Union St., 11-87 Hungerford Terr., Burlington, Vermont
- Coordinates: 44°28′45″N 73°12′31″W
- Area: 28 acres (11 ha)
- Built: 1873
- Architectural style: Bungalow/craftsman, Colonial Revival, Queen Anne
- NRHP reference No.: 95001260
- Added to NRHP: November 13, 1995

The Buell Street–Bradley Street Historic District encompasses a small residential area just to the east of downtown Burlington, Vermont, United States. Roughly bounded by Pearl, South Willard, and College Streets, and Orchard Terrace, the area was developed between about 1890 and 1910, representing one of the last significant neighborhoods built up near the downtown area. The district was listed on the National Register of Historic Places in 1995.

== Description and history ==
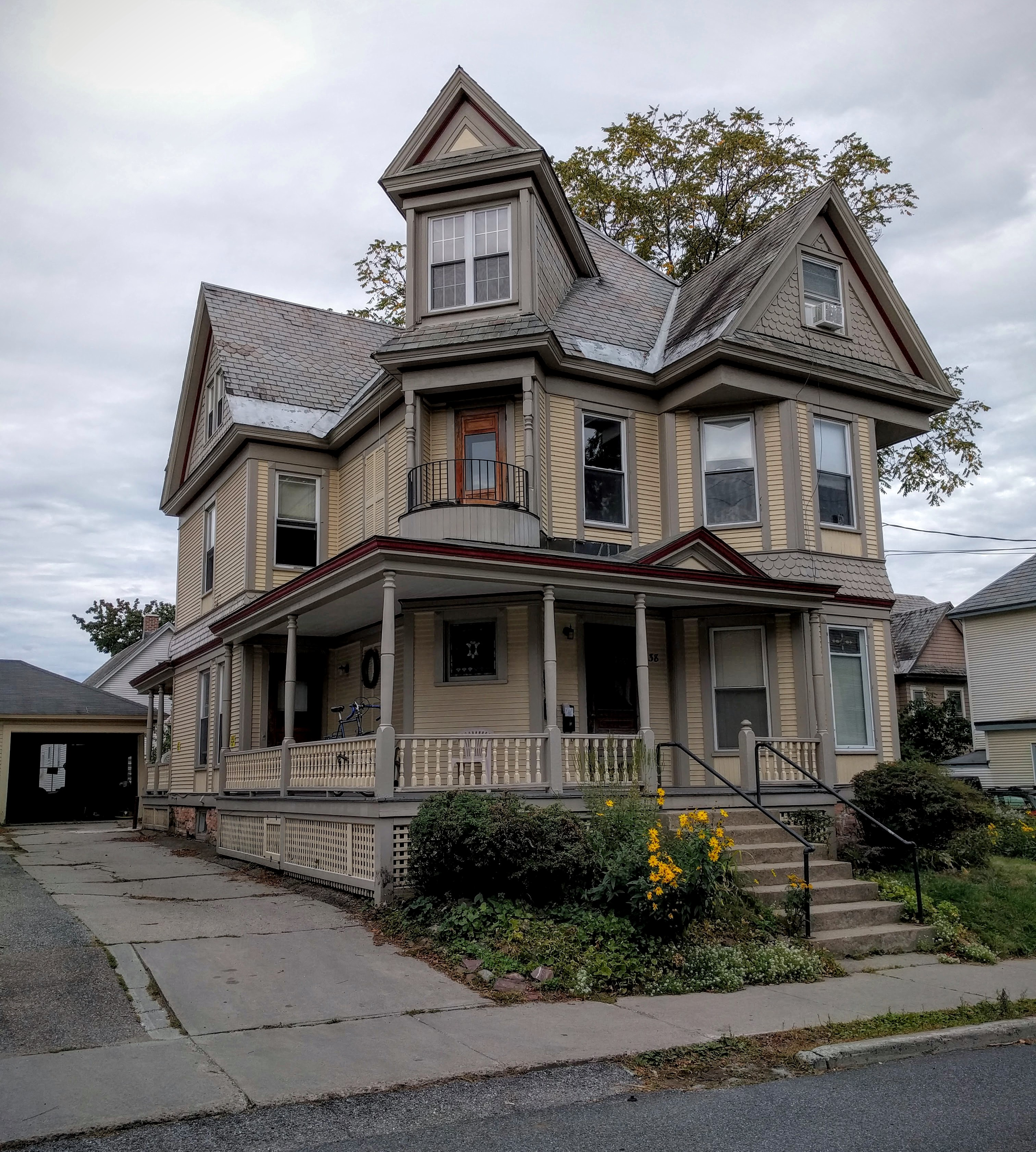
38 Orchard Terrace in the district.

Burlington's early economic history was dominated by activities on the waterfront of Lake Champlain. By the 1850s, lumber had also become a major industry in the city, and manufacturing and retailing also became important in the second half of the 19th century. Development of the Buell Street–Bradley Street area, was delayed in part due to its geography, which included a steep ravine. A railroad line was built through the ravine in 1849, but was later abandoned, and was filled in during the 1860s. This made possible the extension of South Union Street through the area, and opened the area between it and South Willard for development. The area was by the 1880s the last undeveloped area in the proximity of the city's growing downtown, and development proceeded from the late 1880s to about 1930.

The historic district is bounded on the north by Pearl Street, the east by South Willard Street, and the south by College Street, but does not include any buildings on those major through streets. It is bounded on the west by Orchard Terrace and South Union Street, which are just east of South Winooski Avenue, one of the city's downtown thoroughfares. Most of the district's buildings are residential, one to three stories in height, and built of wood. Stylistically, the large majority are in a late Queen Anne Victorian style, although there are examples of Dutch Colonial, Colonial Revival, and Bungalow buildings. At first occupied by main middle-class residents working in the downtown area and the city's manufacturing plants, it is now mainly populated by college students attending nearby schools, principally the University of Vermont, whose campus is east of South Willard.

== See also ==
- National Register of Historic Places listings in Chittenden County, Vermont
