= Duplex at 73-75 Sherman Street =

- U.S. National Register of Historic Places
- Location within Vermont Location within the United States
- Location: 73-75 Sherman St., Burlington, Vermont
- Coordinates: 44°28′55″N 73°13′7″W
- Area: less than one acre
- Built: c. 1912
- Built by: Lucius Bostwick
- Architectural style: Vernacular Colonial Revival
- NRHP reference No.: 13001029
- Added to NRHP: December 31, 2013

The Duplex at 73-75 Sherman Street is a historic multiunit residential building in Burlington, Vermont. Built about 1912 as a livery stable, it was adapted into a residential duplex in 1927. It is a good local example of vernacular Colonial Revival architecture, built as worker housing in the growing city. It was listed on the National Register of Historic Places in 2013.

== Description and history ==
Sherman Street is a short two-block street located on the west side of Burlington's Old North End neighborhood, a densely built residential area near the city's waterfront. 73-75 Sherman Street is a 2-1/2 story wood frame building on the south side of Sherman Street. Unlike most of the street's buildings, it is set well back from the street, and shares a driveway with its neighbor to the left. The building is basically rectangular in shape, with a gabled roof and clapboarded exterior. The right three bays of the front facade are covered by a two-story porch with a shallow-pitch hip roof. The porch's ground floor has an open front, and is supported by square posts, full-length at the center, and mounted on half-walls to the sides. The second-floor porch roof is supported by round columns with Tuscan capitals, mounted on a half wall.

Lucius Bostwick was best known in the city as the owner of a drug store, which was located at Sherman and North Champlain Streets, a short way east of this location. About 1912 he constructed this building to serve as a livery stable. Due to rising demand for housing the neighborhood in the 1920s, he converted it into a two-unit apartment house. A later owner, Joseph Veglia, used the property as an income-producing rental for a number of years, living in nearby housing on Sherman Street. In his later years he occupied one of the units.

== See also ==
- National Register of Historic Places listings in Chittenden County, Vermont
