= Winterbotham Estate =

Historic house in Vermont, United States

- U.S. National Register of Historic Places
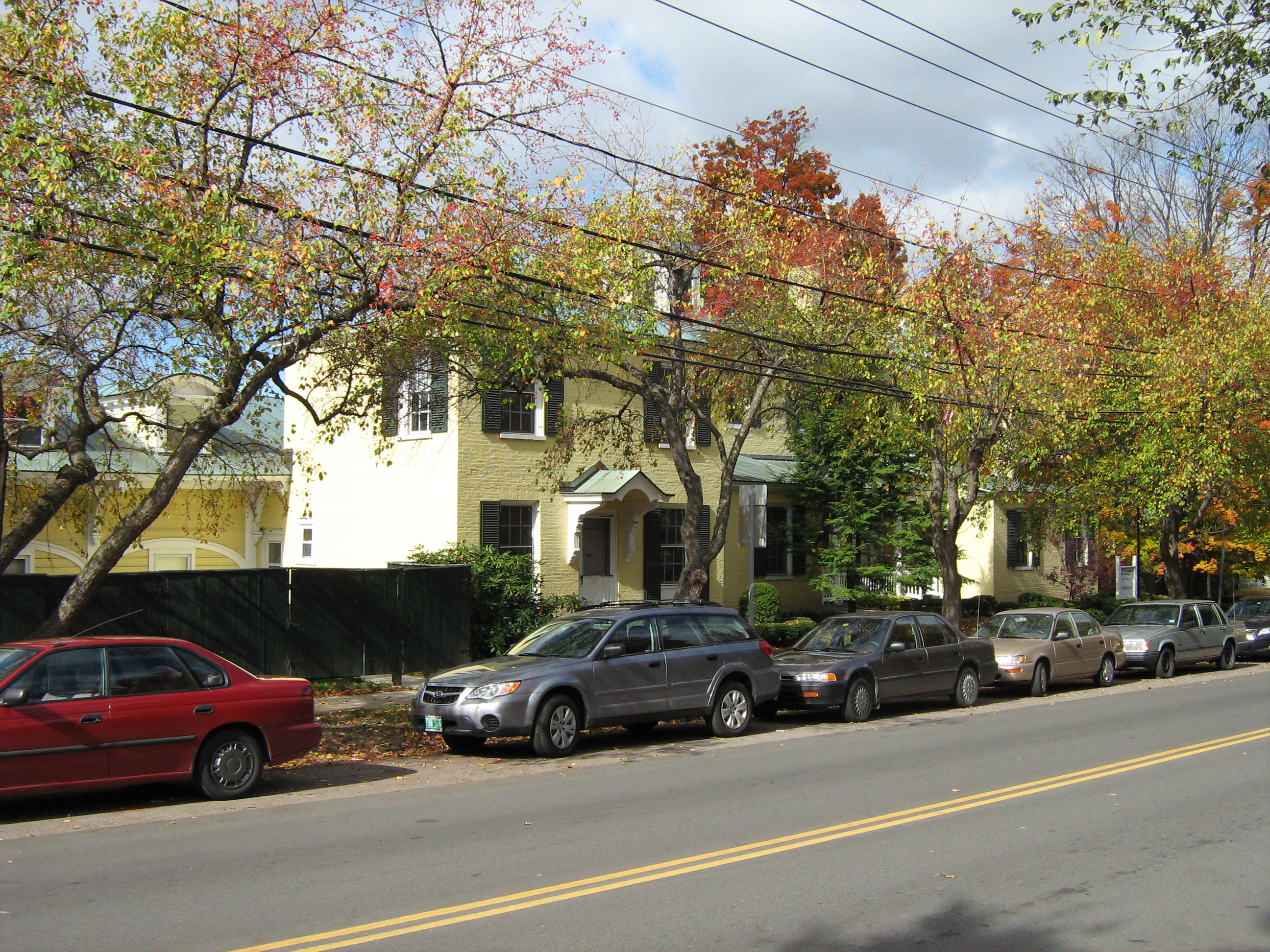

- Location within Vermont Location within the United States
- Location: 163 S. Willard St., Burlington, Vermont
- Coordinates: 44°28′33″N 73°12′22″W
- Area: 3.6 acres (1.5 ha)
- Built: 1820
- Architectural style: Greek Revival, Federal
- NRHP reference No.: 75000140
- Added to NRHP: May 12, 1975

The Winterbotham Estate is a historic former estate property at 163 South Willard Street in Burlington, Vermont. Developed beginning about 1820, it is a prominent local example of a Federal period country estate, with many later additions. The property was listed on the National Register of Historic Places in 1975, at which time it housed the city's school administration. It now houses administrative offices of Champlain College, and is called Skiff Hall.

== Description and history ==
The former Winterbotham Estate consists of 3.6 acres (1.5 ha) at the southwest corner of South Willard and Main Streets. The estate contains three buildings on manicured and landscaped grounds: the main house, a combined carriage barn and stable, and a law office. The main house, set nearest the street corner, is a rambling 2 1/2-story painted brick building that exhibits a variety of Federal and later period styles. Significant features include an octagonal cupola in the Italianate style, and a Greek Revival portico on the north facade facing Main Street. The carriage barn and horse stable are matching gable-roofed wood-frame clapboarded buildings facing South Willard south of the house. The law office is a single-story temple-fronted building facing Main Street west of the house.

The estate house, carriage barn and stable were all built in 1820 by Jonathon Potwin, a merchant based in Troy, New York. In the 1830s it was acquired by an attorney, who built the law office in 1838, and was responsible for most of the Greek Revival alterations to the main house. In 1927 it was acquired by Joseph Winterbotham, who bequeathed it to the University of Vermont in 1954. The university sold it to the city in 1956, which used it to house school administration offices. It is now owned by Champlain College.

== See also ==
- National Register of Historic Places listings in Chittenden County, Vermont
