= Normand House =

Historic house in Vermont, United States

- U.S. National Register of Historic Places
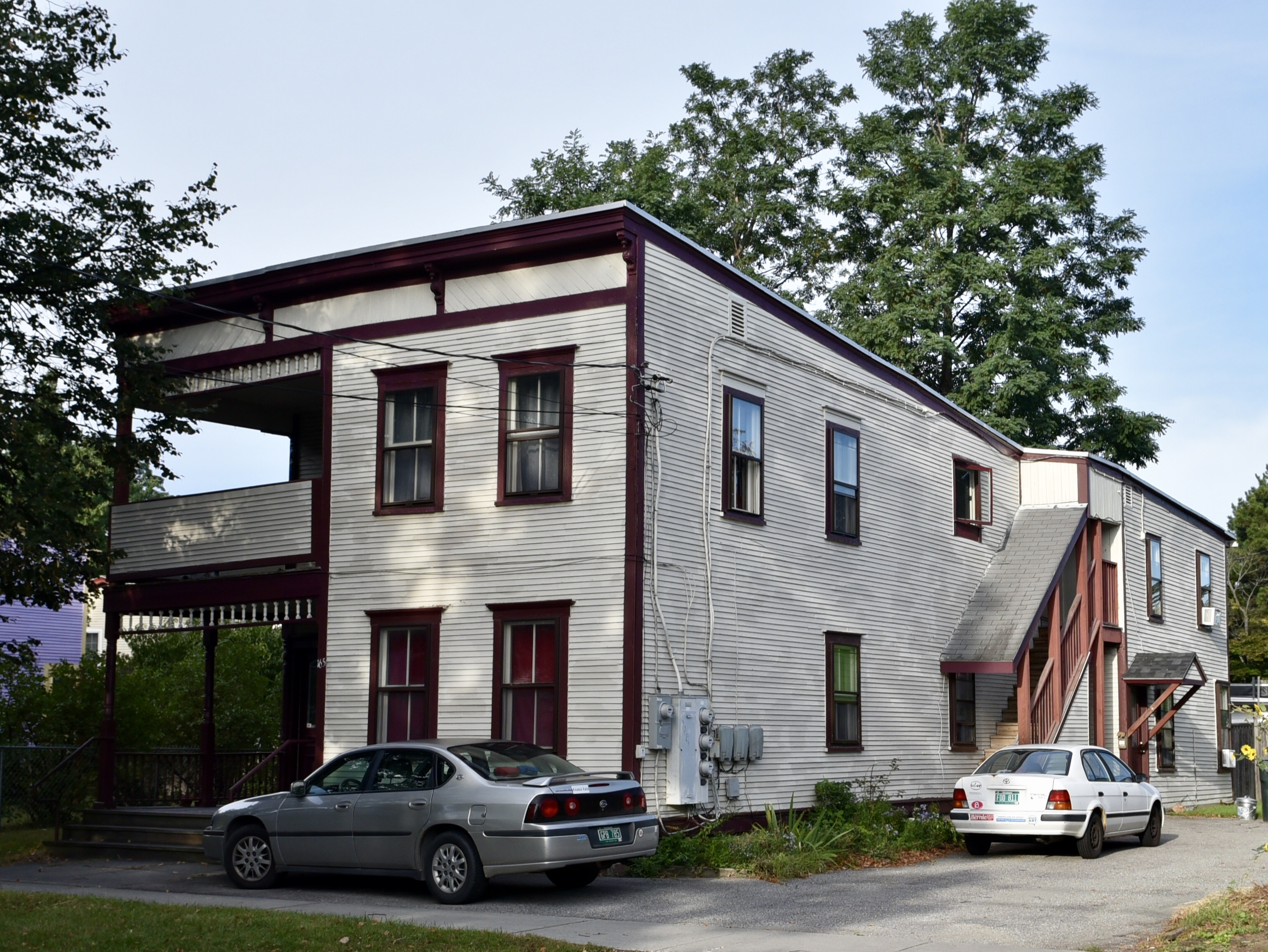

- Location within Vermont Location within the United States
- Location: 163-165, 165 rear Intervale Ave., Burlington, Vermont
- Coordinates: 44°29′20″N 73°12′39″W
- Area: 0.1 acres (0.040 ha)
- Built: 1869
- Built by: LaValle, Louis; Normand, Adeodat
- Architectural style: Italianate, Queen Anne
- MPS: Burlington, Vermont MPS AD
- NRHP reference No.: 07000497
- Added to NRHP: August 8, 2008

The Normand House is a historic residential property at 163-65 Intervale Avenue in Burlington, Vermont. Built in 1869 as a single-family and enlarged into three units in 1890, it is a well-preserved example of period worker housing. It was listed on the National Register of Historic Places in 2008.

== Description and history ==
The Normand House stands near the northern end of Burlington's Old North End neighborhood, on the west side of Intervale Avenue between Willow and Oak Streets. It is a two-story wood-frame structure, with a nearly flat shed roof, clapboarded exterior, and stone foundation. The building's architectural styling is limited to brackets in its eaves and a decorative spindled valance on the front porches. A covered stairway extends up the back of the right side, providing access to the rear unit of the building. The interior, significantly altered since the building's early construction, nevertheless retains some early woodwork.

The front portion of the house is its oldest, built in 1869 by Louis LaValle, a developer, for his personal use, and was one of the first houses built in the area. About 1890 it was converted into three units, raising the main block's roof from a gable to its present shed-roof configuration, and building a large ell onto the rear. It is from this period that the Queen Anne stylistic elements were added to the exterior. The original rear of the property, facing St. Mary's Street, had a second house built on it and was separated from this lot. The building was used as rental housing for workers for most of the 20th century.

== See also ==
- National Register of Historic Places listings in Chittenden County, Vermont
