= District No. 5 Schoolhouse =

- U.S. National Register of Historic Places
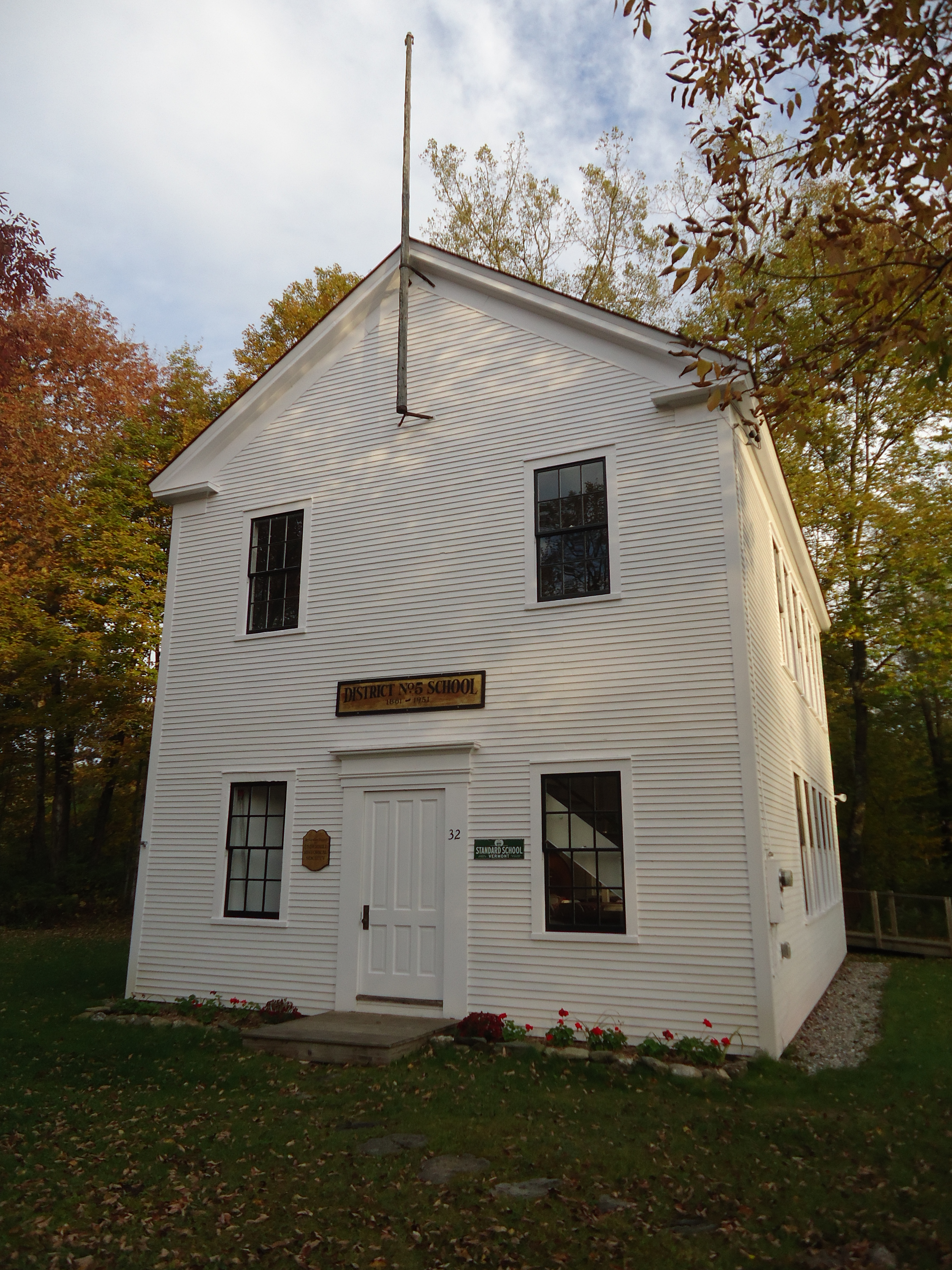

- Location within Vermont Location within the United States
- Location: 32 Pleasant Valley Rd., Underhill, Vermont
- Coordinates: 44°30′33″N 72°53′44″W
- Built: 1861
- NRHP reference No.: 100002311
- Added to NRHP: April 5, 2018

The District No. 5 Schoolhouse is a historic district school building at 32 Pleasant Valley Road in Underhill, Vermont. Built in 1861, it served the town as a school until it was damaged by fire in 1951, but remains a community landmark. It is now owned by the local historical society. It was listed on the National Register of Historic Places in 2018.

== Description and history ==
The District No. 5 Schoolhouse is located a short way east of the village center of Underhill, on the south side of Pleasant Valley Road at its junction with Stevensville Road. It is a 2-1/2 story wood frame structure, with a gabled roof and clapboarded exterior. Its main facade is three bays wide, with an entrance topped by a modest corniced entablature. Windows are set on both levels of the outer bays, trimmed by simple moulding. The building has plain cornerboards, and the gable ends have short returns. A flagpole is mounted at the center of the gable, rising above the roof ridgeline.

The school was built in 1861, as a single-story structure, and was the third school building to stand on the site. Of the town's fifteen district schools, it is now the only surviving one still in public hands. The building's second story was added in 1915, and it served as a school until a fire in its wood stove caused significant interior damage. The building was thereafter used by the town for storage and as a garage, adding a garage door to the front. In 1983, the building was taken over by the local historical society, which undertook a partial restoration of the building to its early 20th-century appearance. Because the restoration was not completed, the building again deteriorated, and a renewed drive was undertaken to make it fully usable as a community space. The restoration was finished in 2019 thanks to local funding through Friends of the Old Schoolhouse.

== See also ==
- National Register of Historic Places listings in Chittenden County, Vermont
