= Dumas Tenements =

- U.S. National Register of Historic Places
- Location within Vermont Location within the United States
- Location: 114 W. Allen & 114 W. Canal Sts., Winooski, Vermont
- Coordinates: 44°29′28″N 73°11′29″W
- Area: 0.4 acres (0.16 ha)
- Built: 1907
- Built by: John Dumas
- Architectural style: vernacular Italianate
- NRHP reference No.: 11000928
- Added to NRHP: September 18, 2012

The Dumas Tenements are a pair of four-unit apartment buildings, set back-to-back at 114 West Allen and 114 West Canal Streets in Winooski, Vermont. Built about 1907 by a French Canadian immigrant, they are among the only buildings of their type to survive the city's urban redevelopment efforts of the late 20th century. They were listed on the National Register of Historic Places in 2012.

== Description and history ==
The Dumas Tenements are located west of downtown Winooski and its historic mill complex. West Allen and West Canal Streets both run east–west from the downtown area, between the Winooski River to the south and railroad tracks to the north. The two buildings are identical in basic structure, and are set back-to-back, the northern one (on West Allen Street) facing West Allen Park and the southern one facing a former industrial site that is now residential. Both are two-story wood-frame structures with flat roofs that have extended eaves with paired Italianate brackets. The walls of one are finished in wooden clapboards, while the other has been resided in vinyl. Each houses four residential units, two on each floor, which are accessed through entrances at the center of the street-facing facade. The entrances are sheltered by two-story porches, and provide access to central stairwells that retain some original features.

The two buildings were constructed about 1907 by John Dumas, a French Canadian immigrant who purchased a single lot from the Burlington Flour Company in that year, conditioned on his construction of multi-unit housing. Four-unit wood-frame buildings of this type were not unusual in the districts of Winooski where worker housing was constructed. Many such buildings were demolished by the city during urban renewal projects of the 1970s and 2000s, and these are among the few that have survived.

== See also ==
- National Register of Historic Places listings in Chittenden County, Vermont
