= Winooski Archeological Site =

- U.S. National Register of Historic Places
- Location: Address restricted Winooski, Vermont
- Area: 15 acres (6.1 ha)
- Built: 0400
- NRHP reference No.: 78000234
- Added to NRHP: January 5, 1978

The Winooski Archeological Site, designated VT-CH-46 by state archaeologists, is a prehistoric Native American site in the city of Winooski, Vermont. First identified in 1972, it is one of the largest Native encampment sites of the Middle Woodland period in the northeastern United States. It was listed on the National Register of Historic Places in 1978, at which time it was recognized as one of just two stratified Woodland period sites in the state.

== Description ==
The Winooski Archeological Site is located on a terrace above the north bank of the Winooski River. It is demarcated on its sides by marshy terrain, which may have made the area a peninsula at the time of its occupation. The site is highly stratified, with cultural materials interbedded with silt from river flooding. Finds at the site include remnants of fire pits, ceramic fragments, stone tools and projectile points, and the debris (debitage) from stone tool manufacture. It is possible that this site is the location of "Winoosqueak", a native settlement mentioned in early French accounts of the region.

The site was first identified in 1972 by an amateur member of the Vermont Archaeological Society, and was from an early date considered at risk due to river erosion. Surveys and investigations through the 1970s under the leadership of state archaeologists identified the bounds and scope of the site. Stone finds at the site were quarried from sites as far off as Pennsylvania, and the ceramic finds are stylistically consistent with traditions found in the Saint Lawrence River valley and the Great Lakes. It is unclear whether the site was subject to long-term seasonal occupation, or repeated short-term occupations, something further archaeological investigation might reveal.

== See also ==
- National Register of Historic Places listings in Chittenden County, Vermont
