= Sutton Farm (Shelburne, Vermont) =

- U.S. National Register of Historic Places
- U.S. Historic district
- Location within Vermont Location within the United States
- Location: 4592 Dorset St., Shelburne, Vermont
- Coordinates: 44°24′13″N 73°10′41″W
- Area: 104 acres (42 ha)
- Built: 1792
- Architectural style: Greek Revival
- MPS: Shelburne, Vermont MPS
- NRHP reference No.: 04001132
- Added to NRHP: October 7, 2004

Sutton Farm is a historic farm property at 4592 Dorset Road in Shelburne, Vermont. Established in 1788, the farm was operated continuously into the late 20th century by a single family, and includes a well-preserved Greek Revival farmhouse. It was listed on the National Register of Historic Places in 2004.

== Description and history ==
Sutton Farm is located in a rural area of northeastern Shelburne, on about 100 acres (40 ha) of land bisected by Dorset Road south of Barstow Road. The main farm complex is set on both sides of Dorset Road, south of Sutton Farm Lane, a residential development built on land historically associated with the farm. Including that development, the farm property is roughly rectangular, with acreage on the west side of the road cultivated, and that on the east side divided between crops, pasture, and hay. Stone walls line some of the boundaries between usages. The farmstead consists of a brick Cape style farmhouse, set on the west side of the road; it was built about 1815 as a plank-framed wood frame structure, and was finished in brick about 1830, at which time its Greek Revival features were also added. Adjacent to the house are a garage of and chicken house, both built in the 1930s, while a long barn and silos, all from the mid-20th century, stand on the east side of the road.

The farm property was acquired in 1788 by Benjamin Sutton, a native of Greenwich, Connecticut. He and his family lived at first in log cabins (built in two separate locations on the property), before this house was built in the mid-1810s. The house is notable for its unusually high kneewall in the upper story, a feature found only in a few surviving homes in northeastern Shelburne, and thus probably the work of a particular local builder. The house was finished in brick, probably when Sutton's son Bryon took over the farm in the 1830s. The Sutton descendants continued to rent the farm until about 1985. The cattle and equipment were sold at an auction in 1991. Since then, the Maille Family (owners of the Barber - LaMothe - Maille Farm adjoining the property to the south) has farmed the property and utilized the buildings.

In 2004, The Vermont Land Trust acquired the western portion of the property of this farm and the adjoining Barber - LaMothe - Maille Farm that also borders Shelburne Pond. Fee simple ownership of this portion of the Sutton Farm will pass to the Maille Family, which have continued utilizing the facilities and farming the land.

== See also ==
- National Register of Historic Places listings in Chittenden County, Vermont
