= Martin L. Kelsey House =

Historic house in Vermont, United States

- U.S. National Register of Historic Places
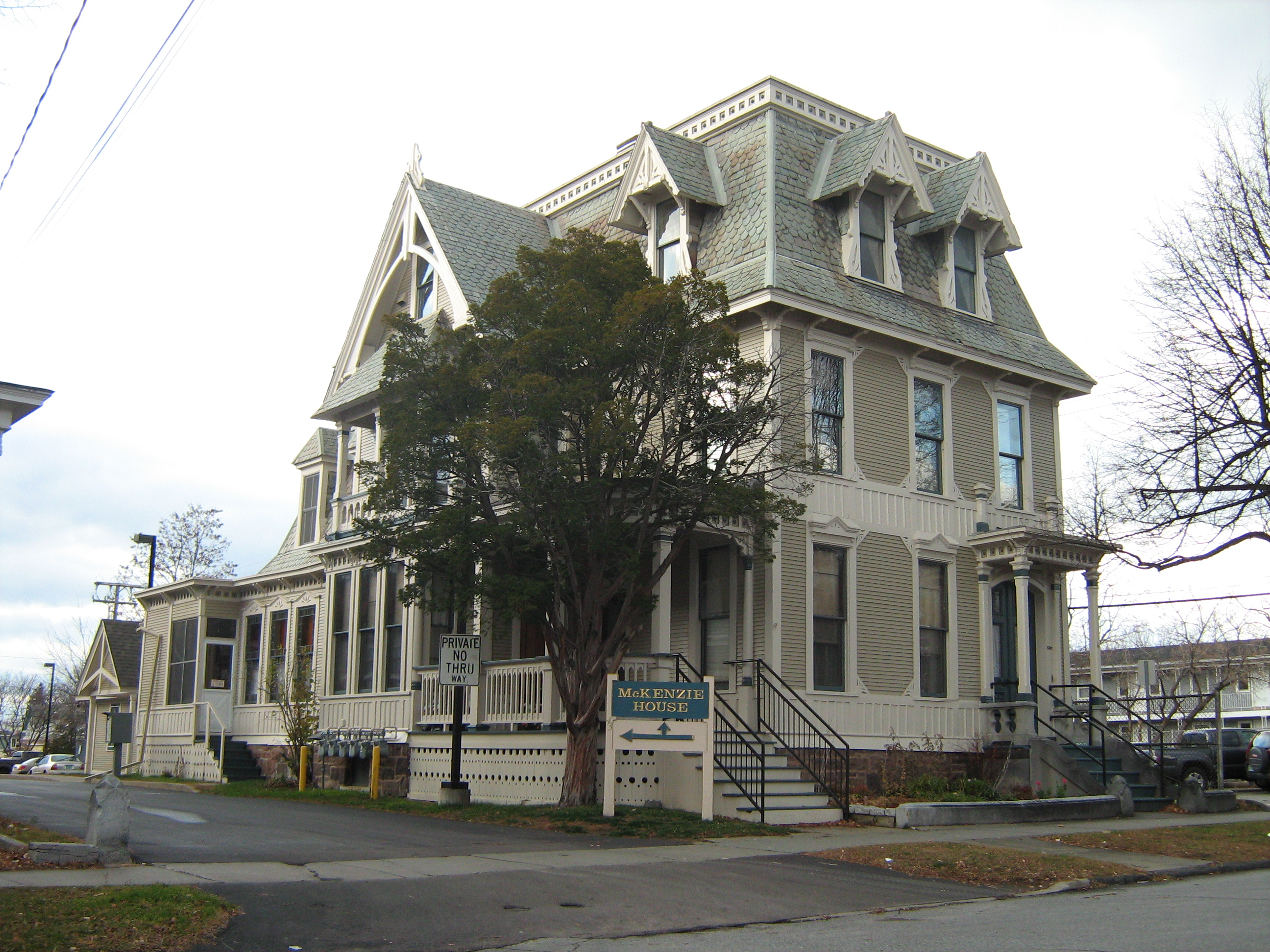

- Location within Vermont Location within the United States
- Location: 43 Elmwood Ave, Burlington, Vermont
- Coordinates: 44°28′54″N 73°12′50″W
- Area: less than one acre
- Built: 1879
- Architectural style: Late Victorian, Victorian-eclectic
- NRHP reference No.: 83003208
- Added to NRHP: February 24, 1983

The Martin L. Kelsey House is a historic house at 43 Elmwood Avenue in Burlington, Vermont. Built in 1879 for a local merchant, it is a distinctive and architecturally varied house, with elements of the Second Empire, Queen Anne, and Stick styles on display. It was listed on the National Register of Historic Places in 1983, and now forms part of a senior housing complex.

== Description and history ==
The Martin L. Kelsey House stands just north of downtown Burlington, on the west side of Elmwood between Pearl and Grant Streets in a mixed residential-commercial area. It is a 2 1/2-story wood-frame structure, with a mansard roof on the main block providing a full third floor. Ells of decreasing size and height extend to the rear of the house, which is set on a small parcel now surrounded by parking lots. The exterior has a large number of decorative elements borrowing from a variety of architectural styles. The mansard roof has a flared lower section, and is crowned by a band of wooden squares with recessed panels. Its dormers have steeply pitched gabled roofs, with elaborate Stick style decoration, and whose windows are framed by Italianate moulding. A large gabled section projects on the left side also with Stick decoration and a finial at the top of the ridge. The main facade is three bays wide, with bands of paneled woodwork below the groundfloor windows and between the first and second-floor windows. An entrance is in the right bay, with an Italianate porch featuring a valance of square panels similar to those that crown the roof. A second porch with similar styling extends along the left side to the projecting section.

The house was built in 1879, in what was at the time a fashionable residential area north of Burlington's main commercial business district. Martin L. Kelsey, for whom it was built, owned a shoe and boot store on Church Street just two blocks away. His neighbors were similar well-to-do merchants and professionals. As the business district expanded, the neighborhood declined. The house was converted into apartments, and many of its neighbors were demolished in the 1960s. It has since been made part of McKenzie House, a senior housing complex.

== See also ==
- National Register of Historic Places listings in Chittenden County, Vermont
