= Apartment Building at 27 and 31 Peru Street and 29 Johnson Street =

- U.S. National Register of Historic Places
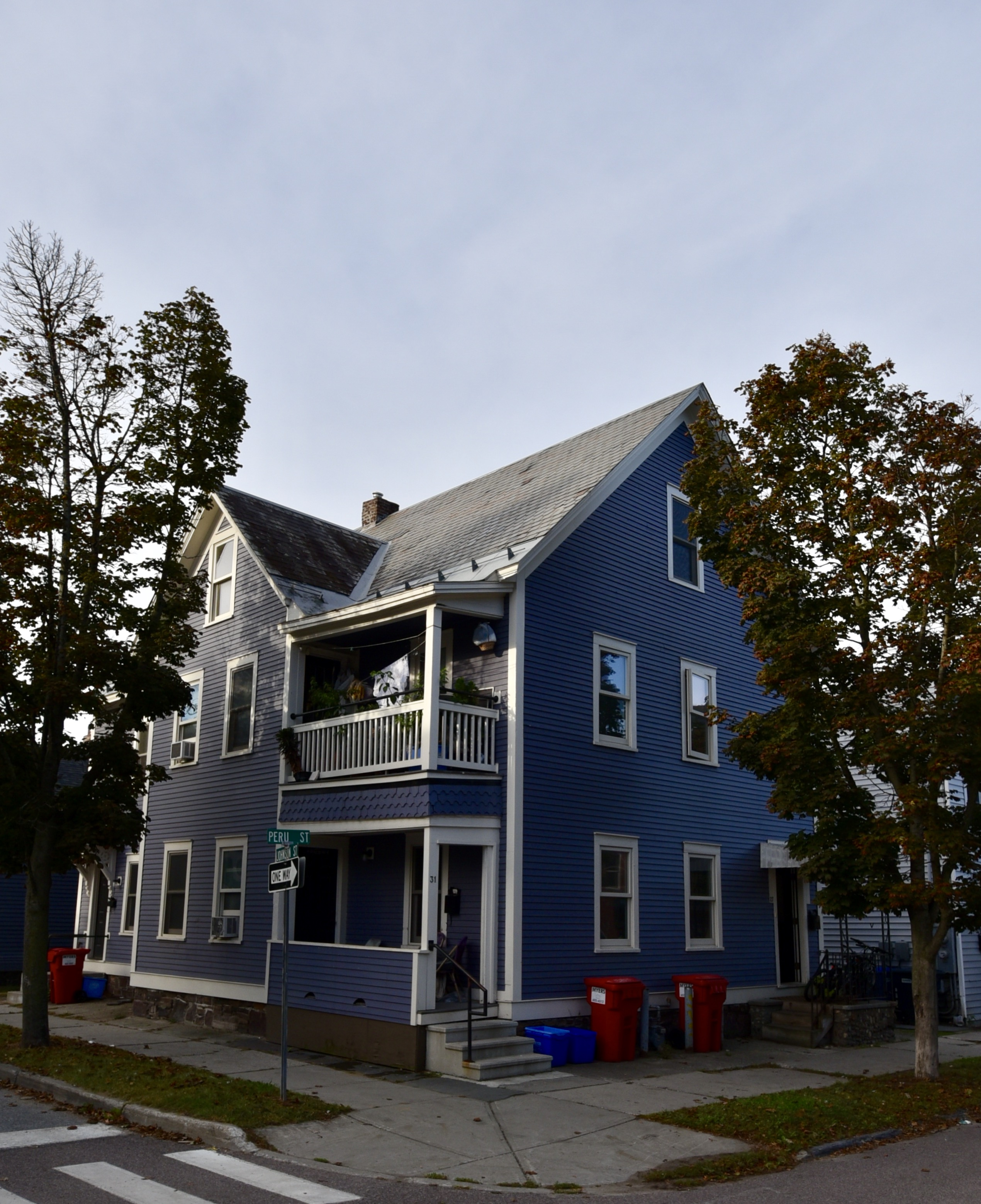

- Location within Vermont Location within the United States
- Location: 27, 31 Peru St., 29 Johnson St., Burlington, Vermont
- Coordinates: 44°28′57″N 73°12′59″W
- Area: less than one acre
- Built: c. 1889
- Built by: Eli Johnson
- Architectural style: Queen Anne
- NRHP reference No.: 13001119
- Added to NRHP: January 22, 2014

The Apartment Building at 27 and 31 Peru Street and 29 Johnson Street is a historic multiunit residential building in Burlington, Vermont. Built about 1889, it is a good local example of vernacular Queen Anne Victorian architecture. It was listed on the National Register of Historic Places in 2014.

== Description and history ==
The building at the southwest corner of Peru and Johnson Streets is a 2-1/2 story wood frame building. The Old North End neighborhood it stands in is just north of Burlington's central business district, and is densely built with residential buildings. The building is basically rectangular in shape, with a gabled roof and clapboarded exterior. A rectangular gabled section projects from the long east side, facing Johnson Street, with a two-story porch extending to the building's northeast corner. One entrance from the porch provides access to two of the building's three units, while the third is accessed from an entrance at the opposite end of the northern facade, sheltered by a metal hood. The skirt of the second-floor porch is finished in scallop-cut shingles. The interior finishes date primarily from the 1960s, although original staircase railings survive.

Eli Johnson built this house as part of his development of Johnson Street, begun in 1888. Johnson was a prominent local businessman, with a partnership interest in a printing firm and also in a retail pharmacy on College Street. He began the development during a period when the city's economic growth had led to housing shortages for working-class families. Early residents of Johnson Street were typically of English or Irish extraction. Originally built as a duplex, it was converted to three units in the early 1960s.

== See also ==
- National Register of Historic Places listings in Chittenden County, Vermont
