= Hezekiah Barnes =

Major General from Charlotte, Vermont

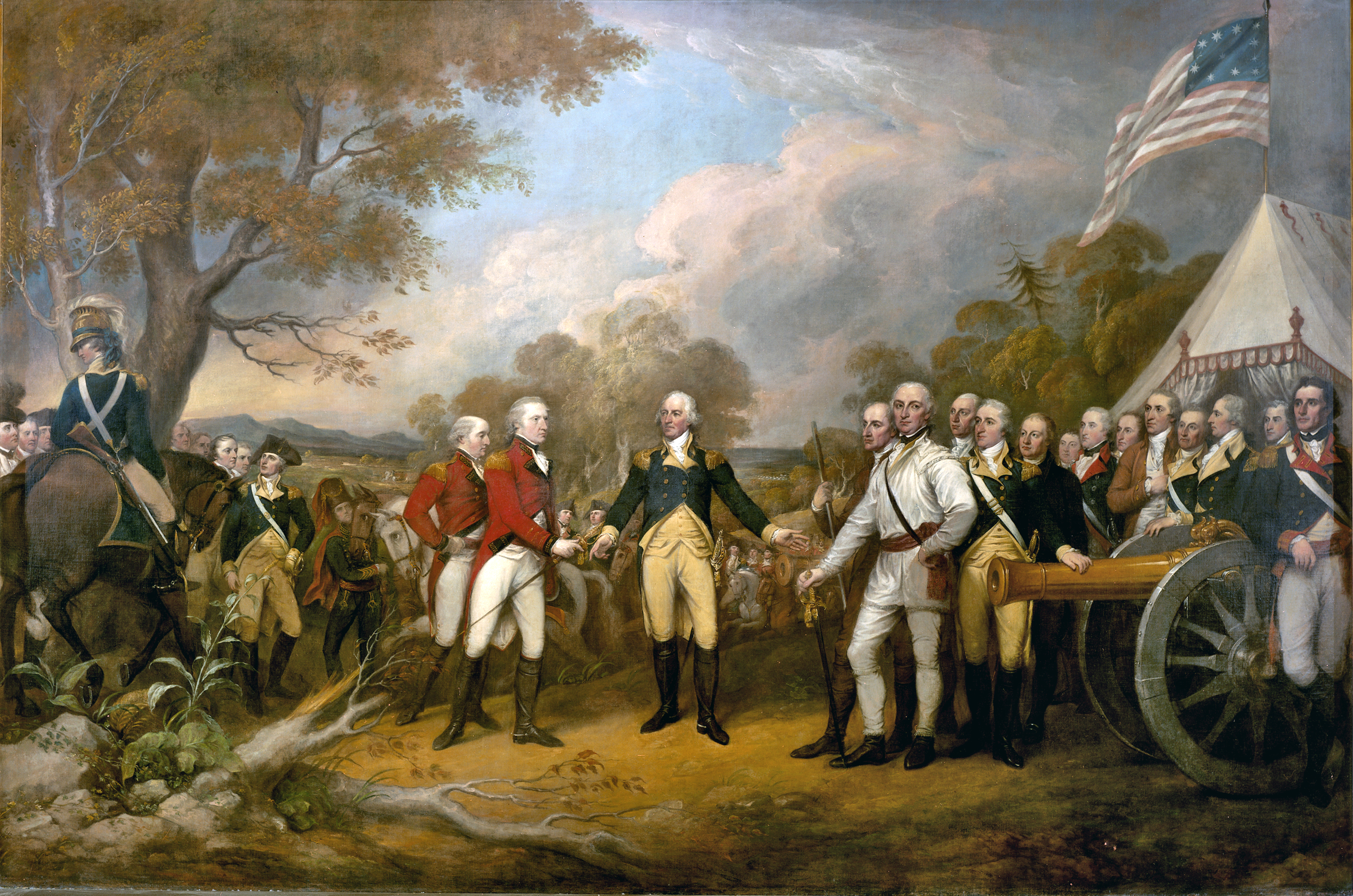
Saratoga campaign, Barnes was an officer in the Continental Army during this campaign, would become Major General of the Vermont militia

Major General Hezekiah Barnes (c. 1760–1813) was an American military officer of the United States Militia, tavern proprietor, and politician from Charlotte, Vermont. He was an early settler of Charlotte and became the city's Postmaster. He also served as an officer during the American War of Independence, alongside his father, Colonel Asa Barnes, and built the Stagecoach Tavern.

== Early life ==
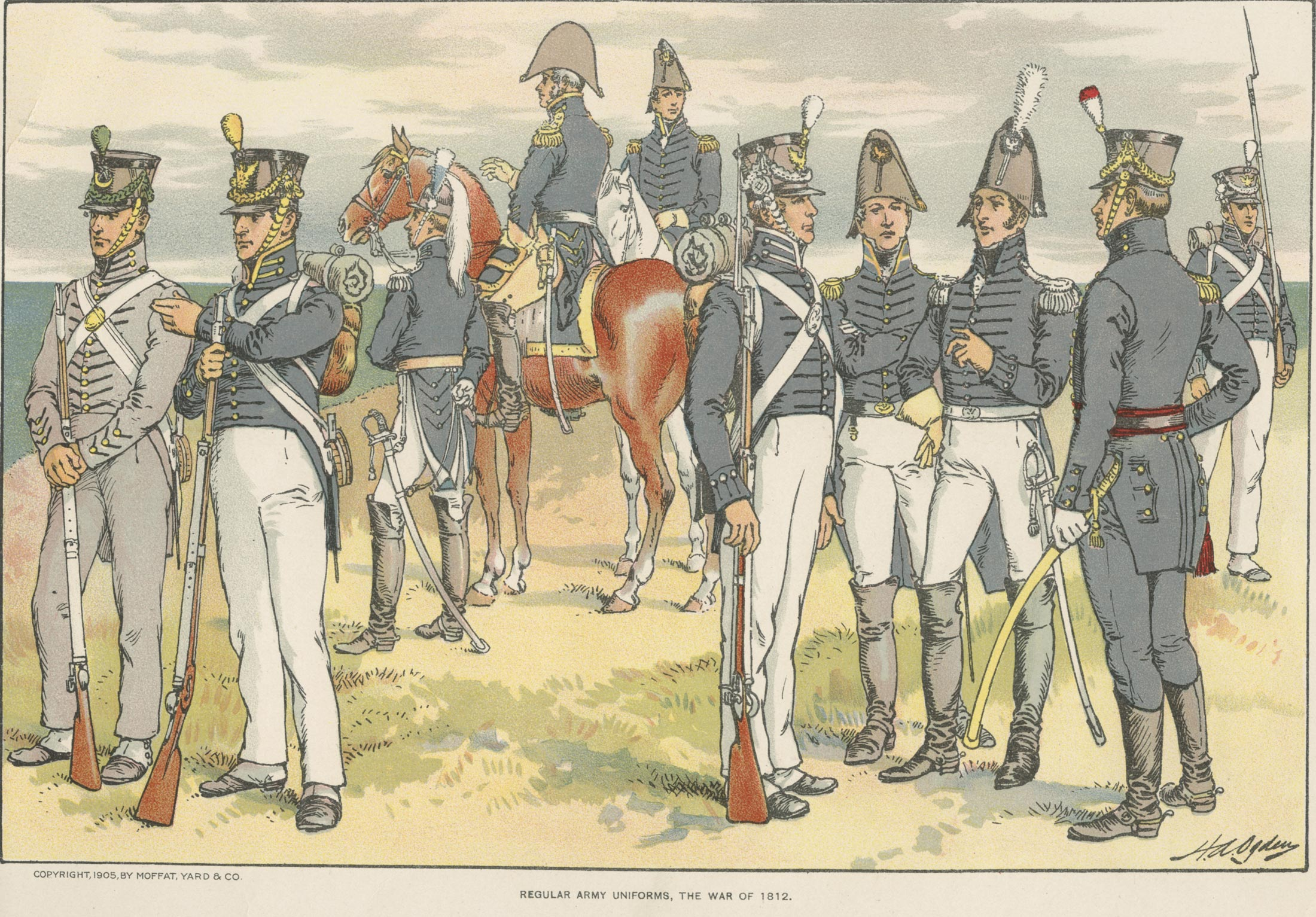
Army uniforms of the War of 1812, Barnes was Major General at that time

Hezekiah Barnes was born in about 1760 in Wallingford, Connecticut, the son of Colonel Asa Barnes and Lois Yale, daughter of Abel Yale, members of the Yale family. His father fought in the American Revolutionary War, being Colonel of a Berkshire County regiment. His mother was the great-granddaughter of Capt. Thomas Yale, co-founder of Wallingford, Connecticut. His grandfather, Capt. Gershom Barnes served in the French and Indian War.

Barnes served as an officer during the American War of Independence, and moved to Charlotte, Vermont, becoming an early settler of this territory, along with his father and other men. He was elected one of the surveyors of highways, with Capt. Hill as sealer of the weights and measures. He was made a juryman, along with his father, Col. Barnes, and Dr. Hough, Capt. McNeile, Capt. Hill, and others.

== Biography ==
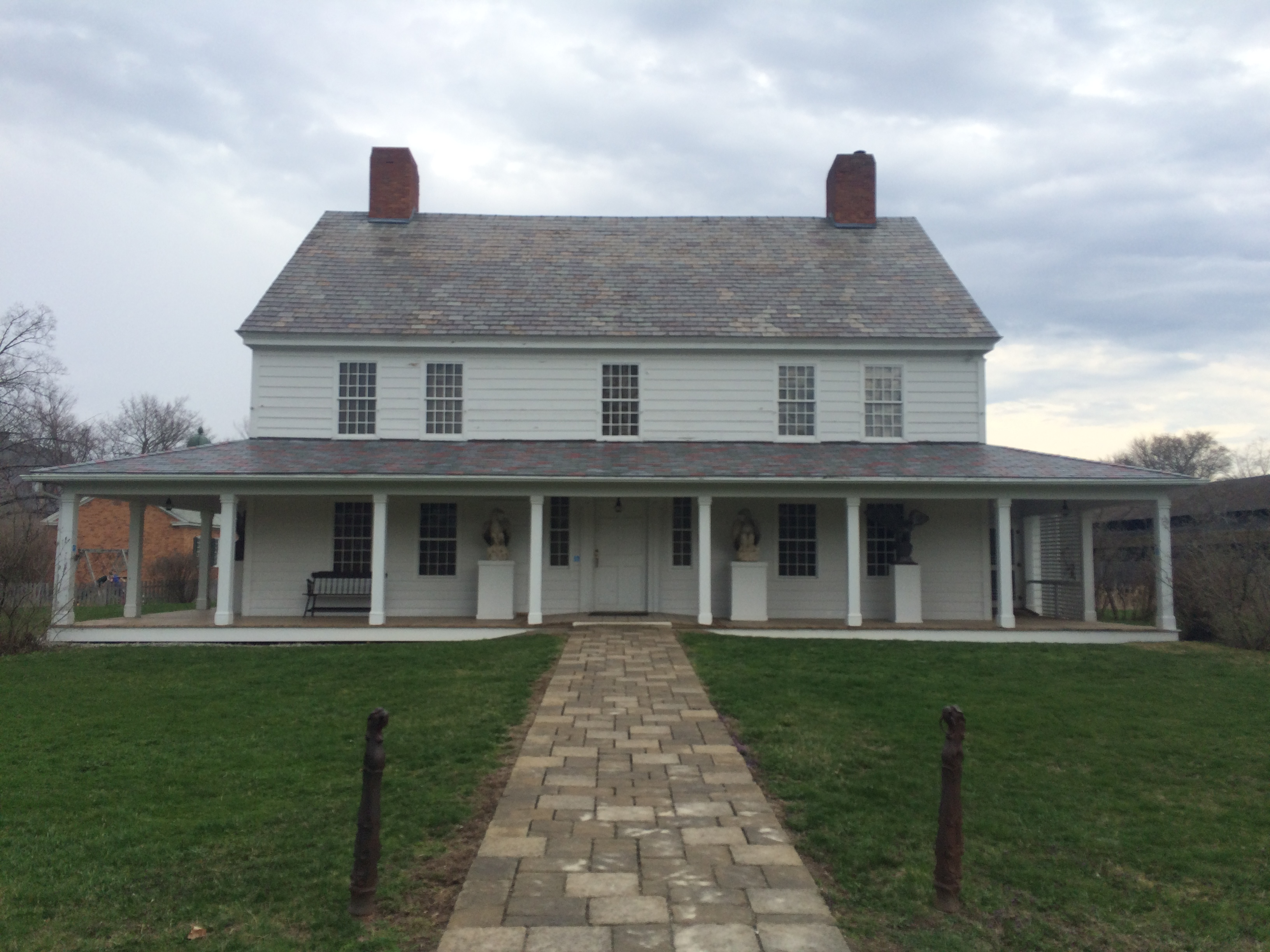
Stagecoach Tavern, home of Maj. Gen. Barnes, now the Shelburne Museum

At the organization of the town of Charlotte, Vermont, his father was chosen as one of the selectmen. The meeting on 27 March would be held at Hezekiah Barnes's house, today named the Stagecoach Inn. The house was used as a trading post along the main trading route from Montreal to Lake Champlain. The home was built in traditional Georgian style, with a ballroom and ten fireplaces. In 1800, Capt. Harrington of the Continental Army founded a distillery business in the city, supplying Barnes's trading post.

He became wealthy with his tavern, as Charlotte became a fast-growing city with its lakefront location and fertile agricultural land. A future competitor would be the Tavern on Mutton Hill of Nathaniel Newell. The city of Charlotte was larger than Burlington at the time, today Vermont's largest city. He was a sergeant in Capt. Read's company, and Capt. in his father's company, being Col. Barnes's regiment. He was part of the Saratoga campaign, marching from Lanesborough to Saratoga.

Barnes became a captain in the Colonial army and Major General of the Vermont militia. He became a member of Col. Benjamin Simonds's regiment named Simonds' Regiment of Militia. In 1810, Barnes was made Assistant Judge to Chief Judge Ezra Butler, future Governor of Vermont. He then became County Court Judge and a member of Vermont House of Representatives. Barnes was Major-General, along with Brigadier General John Newell, Oliver Hubbell as Quartermaster-sergeant, Nathaniel Newell as Captain of Cavalry, David H. Griswold as Lieutenant, and with his cousin Lyman Yale as captain, the grandfather of inventor Caroline Ardelia Yale.

They will be involved in the War of 1812. Barnes was also Postmaster of Charlotte. He was representative of Chittenden County from 1798 to 1809. Barnes died during the epidemic of 1813, along with 70 inhabitants, including Rev. Abel Newell and Dr. James Towner. He died on March 20, 1813, in Charlotte, Vermont.
