= Charlotte Congregational Church (Charlotte, Vermont) =

Historic church in Chittenden County, Vermont, United States

- U.S. Historic district – Contributing property
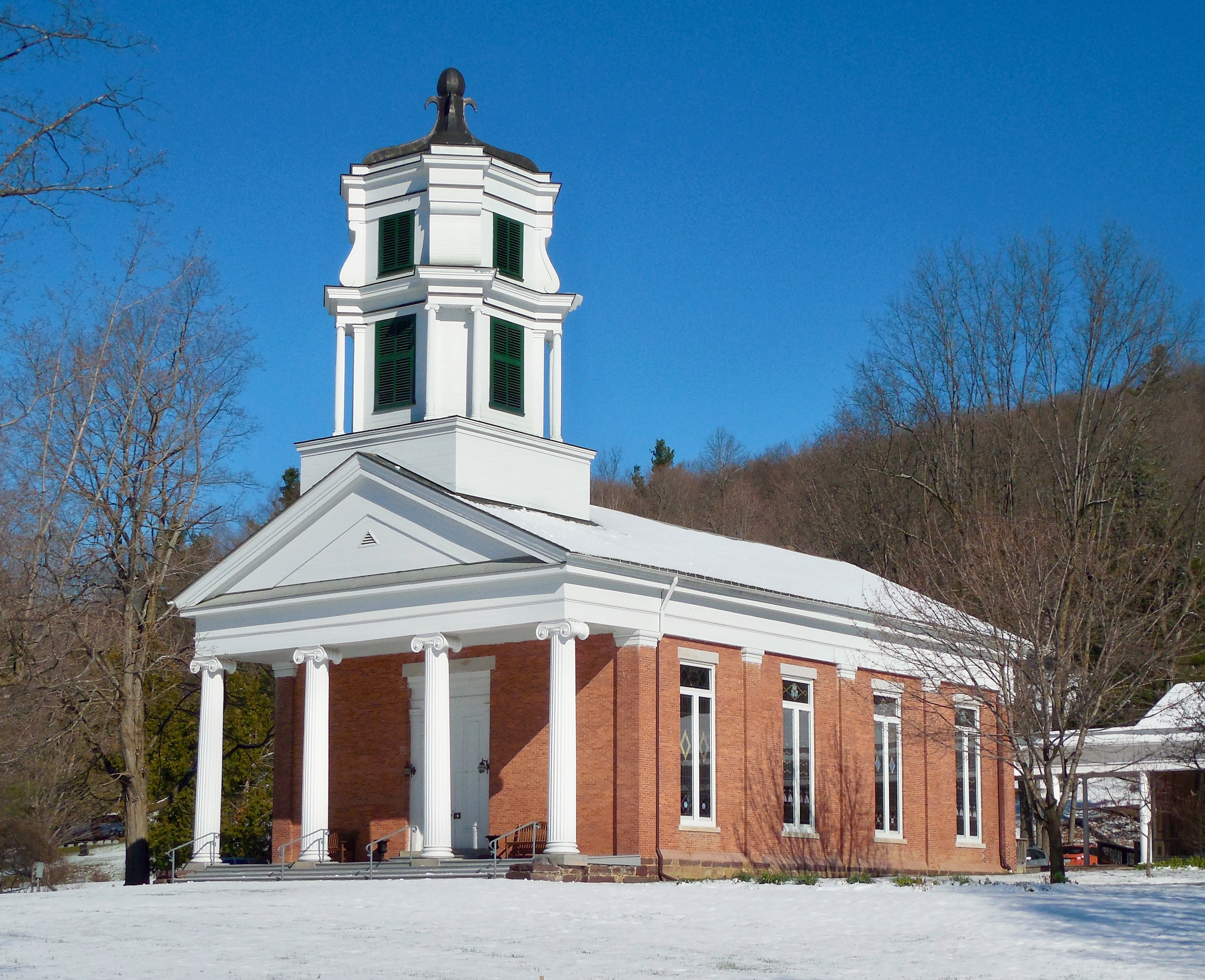
- Charlotte Congregational Church

- Location within Vermont Location within the United States
- Location: 403 Church Hill Road, Charlotte, Vermont
- Coordinates: 44°18′52″N 73°14′25″W
- Built: 1849-51
- Architectural style: Greek Revival
- Website: https://www.charlotteucc.org/
- Part of: Charlotte Center Historic District (ID84003460)
- Added to NRHP: July 19, 1984

Charlotte Congregational Church is a United Church of Christ church in the Town of Charlotte, Vermont, in the United States. Constructed between 1849 and 1851, the Greek Revival style church was dedicated on 8 July 1851. The church replaced the original predecessor wooden church constructed onsite in 1798 that had been damaged by fire in 1848, and subsequently torn down that year.

The Church was listed as part of the Charlotte Center Historic District on the Vermont State Register of Historic Places on 9 April 1980 and part of the Charlotte Center Historic District on the National Register of Historic Places on 19 July 1984.

== History ==
The church was founded on January 3, 1792. Initially consisting of four members, Daniel Hosford Jr., John Hill, Moses Yale, and Joseph Simonds, the church was duly declared a church of Christ. Subsequent to receiving the right hand of fellowship, the initial members assembled at the house of Daniel Hosford Jr. and passed the following resolutions, where Horsford was elected to serve as clerk pro tem, John Hill was elected as moderator, and by resolution of the committee, Daniel O. Gillet was invited to serve as the pastor according to the order of the Gospel. After his acceptance, the Rev. Gillet remained at the post until 1799.

The first church building was constructed circa 1798 as a wooden two-story structure with windows on both levels, and a bell tower with a tall pointed spire. The main door faced southward where two more doors existed on the east and west sides. Initially, there were no heating facilities. The church had a gallery on three sides and a high pulpit ascended by "a long winding flight of stairs". The wooden church was damaged by fire that occurred sometime between 5 and 19 January 1848 and was subsequently torn down because a Burlington architect by the name of Mr. Herick had estimated that the church would incur a greater cost to repair than to rebuild. Originally estimated to cost $3,000 to build a 40 ft (12 m) x 60 ft (18 m) structure, the replacement structure was constructed with red brick and designed to accommodate 350 people. Lanson Edgerton served as the chief bricklayer.

By 1882, the church including the grounds was valued at $6,000. During this period, the church had 163 members.

The church became incorporated sometime between 1890-91. For some years, attendance at the Baptist church in East Charlotte (founded in 1807 and constructed in 1808) had been declining before it was closed in 1938, estimably before it became insolvent. However, both churches hence conjoined to cooperate within their separate denominations via Articles of Incorporation, dated on August 15 of that year. Article 2 stated that "The denominational organization shall remain intact, and persons wishing to come into membership of the United Church may choose on which roll they wish their names registered.", where Article 4 instantiated "An executive committee shall consist of five persons, three chosen from the Congregational Church and two from the Baptist Church in accordance with the bylaws of each church."

The denominational separation ended sometime between 1961–62 and the church subsequently voted to affiliate themselves with the United Church of Christ. Church records indicated; "A motion was made to dissolve the Federation of the Congregational and Baptist Societies drawn up in 1937, since the Baptist Society has already disbanded. Following discussion the motion was passed and it was added to offer the right hand of the fellowship to any Baptist member to join with the Congregation society."

=== 2009 Steeple Restoration ===
In 2009, a major restoration project was undertaken on the church and a capital campaign was conducted, which raised $428,000. The project was completed in the spring of 2010 and included a full restoration of the steeple truss structure; the installation of a new slate roof; rebuilding of the chimney; replacement and re-pointing of deteriorated brickwork; stripping, restoration, repair, repainting of the columns, and repair of their bases; upgrading of the front porch with reinforced steps; the installation of a sidewalk, handrails, industrial gutters, vented glass windows to protect the existing stained glass; and the upgrade of electrical wiring within the attic; and the installation of new dimmer switches in the narthex. The work was completed by Southgate Steeplejacks out of Barre, Vermont for an estimated total project cost of $238,010, but completed for $228,010.

== Architecture ==
Designed in Greek Revival style, the notable features of the church include large squatted bell tower affixed atop with an unusual pineapple-shaped finial. The tower is placed atop a forward-projecting pediment supported by four Ionic columns posted upon granite bases. The slender application of the columns are seemingly disproportionate to the tower width. A full wooden entablature wraps the entirety of the building. The tympanum of the pediment is decorated with a molded cornice that is detailed with a recessed triangular panel which is inset with smaller louvered triangular-shaped vent. The bell tower reflects the design portrayed in Plate K of the American Builder's Companion by Asher Benjamin, published in 1827. The NRHP nomination form suggests the tower and church massing are of a similar yet simplified design to churches built by Shoreham, Vermont architect and master builder James Lamb.

== See also ==
- Charlotte Center Historic District
