= Quinlan's Covered Bridge =

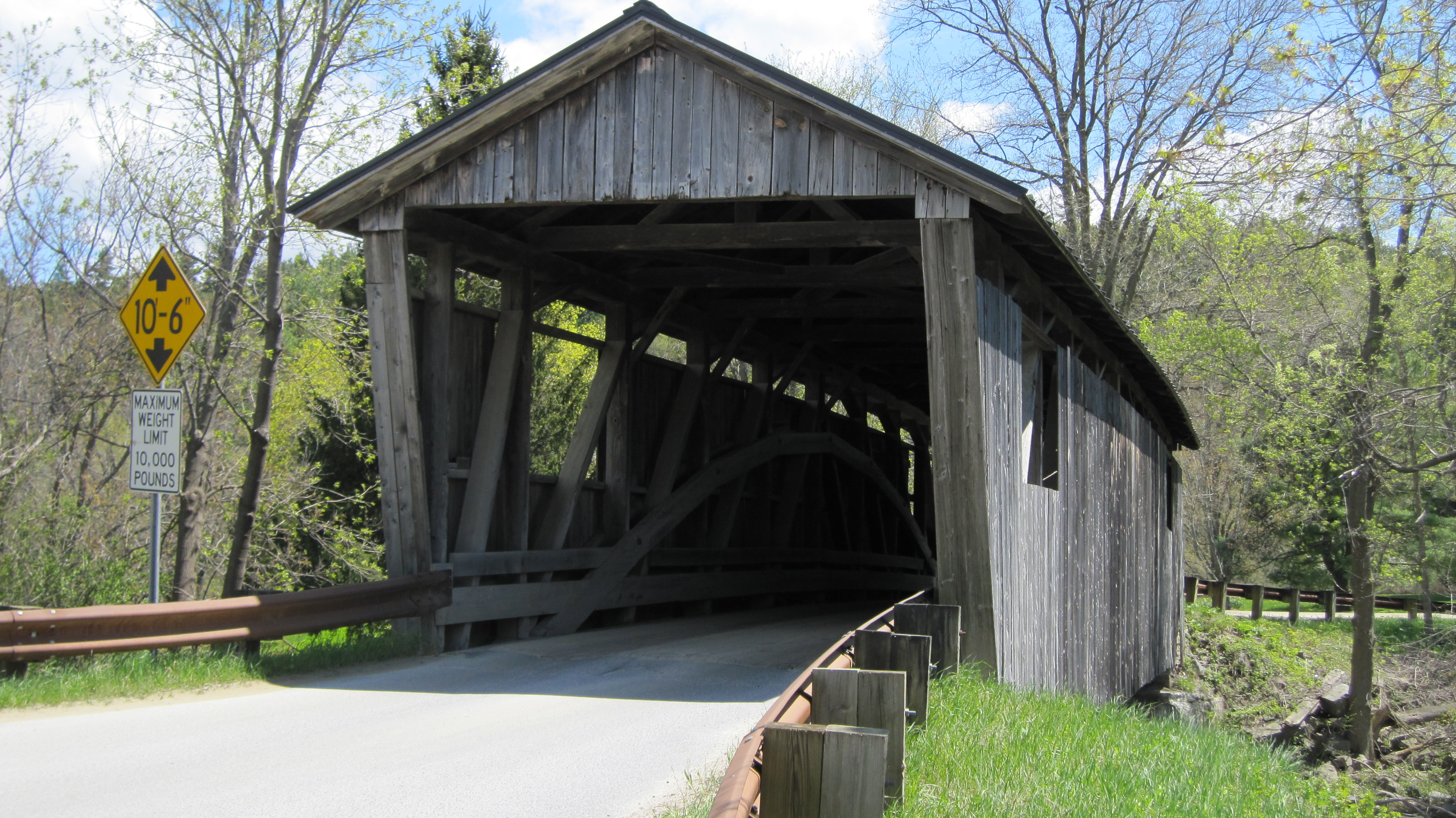
- Bridge in U.S. state of Vermont
- Coordinates: 44°16′34″N 73°11′02″W
- Carries: Automobile
- Crosses: Lewis Creek
- Locale: Charlotte, Vermont
- Official name: The Quinlan Covered Bridge
- Maintained by: Town of Charlotte
- ID number: VT-04-03

Characteristics
- Design: Covered, Burr Arch
- Material: Wood
- Total length: 86 ft (26.21 m)
- Width: 16.5 ft (5.03 m) wide with a 13.5 ft (4.11 m) roadway
- Height: 11 ft (3.35 m) Vertical Clearance at Center of Bridge
- No. of spans: 1
- Load limit: 5 tons
- Clearance above: 10.5 ft (3.20 m)

History
- Constructed by: unknown
- Construction end: 1849
- Quinlan's Covered Bridge
- U.S. National Register of Historic Places
- Location within Vermont Location within the United States
- Coordinates: 44°16′35″N 73°11′4″W
- Area: 1 acre (0.40 ha)
- NRHP reference No.: 74000208
- Added to NRHP: September 10, 1974

Quinlan's Covered Bridge, also called the Quinlan Covered Bridge, or colloquially known as the Lower Covered Bridge, and Sherman Covered Bridge is a wooden covered bridge that crosses Lewis Creek in Charlotte, Vermont on Monkton Road. It was listed on the National Register of Historic Places in 1974. It is one of nine 19th-century Burr arch covered bridges in the state.

== Description and history ==
Quinlan's Covered Bridge is located in a rural area of southeastern Charlotte, which provides access for Monkton Road (Town Highway 36) over the Lewis Creek to an adjacent intersection with Spear Street (a major Class 2 Town Highway) at the bridge's western end. The bridge is a single-span Burr arch truss, 86 feet (26 m) long and 16.5 feet (5.0 m), with a roadway width of 13.5 feet (4.1 m). Each truss has, in addition to diagonal braces and vertical posts, a pair of timber arches bolted to it. It has a gabled roof, and its exterior is clad in vertical board siding, which extends around to the inside of the portals. It rests on stone abutments faced in concrete.

The builder is unknown, but most likely the same builder as the Sequin Covered Bridge upstream. The name "Lower Bridge" was because it is downstream of the Sequin (or "Upper") bridge. This is common in Vermont where multiple bridges crossed the same body of water in the same town. The name "Quinlan" is attributed to the family of the same name that held land in the area. The name "Sherman" comes from the owner of a sawmill that was located adjacent to the bridge site.

In 1949 or 1950 steel beams were installed under the deck to strengthen it. The bridge underwent reconstruction in 2013.

== See also ==
- List of covered bridges in Vermont
- National Register of Historic Places listings in Chittenden County, Vermont
- List of bridges on the National Register of Historic Places in Vermont
