= Stagecoach Inn (Shelburne, Vermont) =

Exhibit building in Shelburne, Vermont

Coordinates: 44°22′38.33″N 73°13′47.26″W

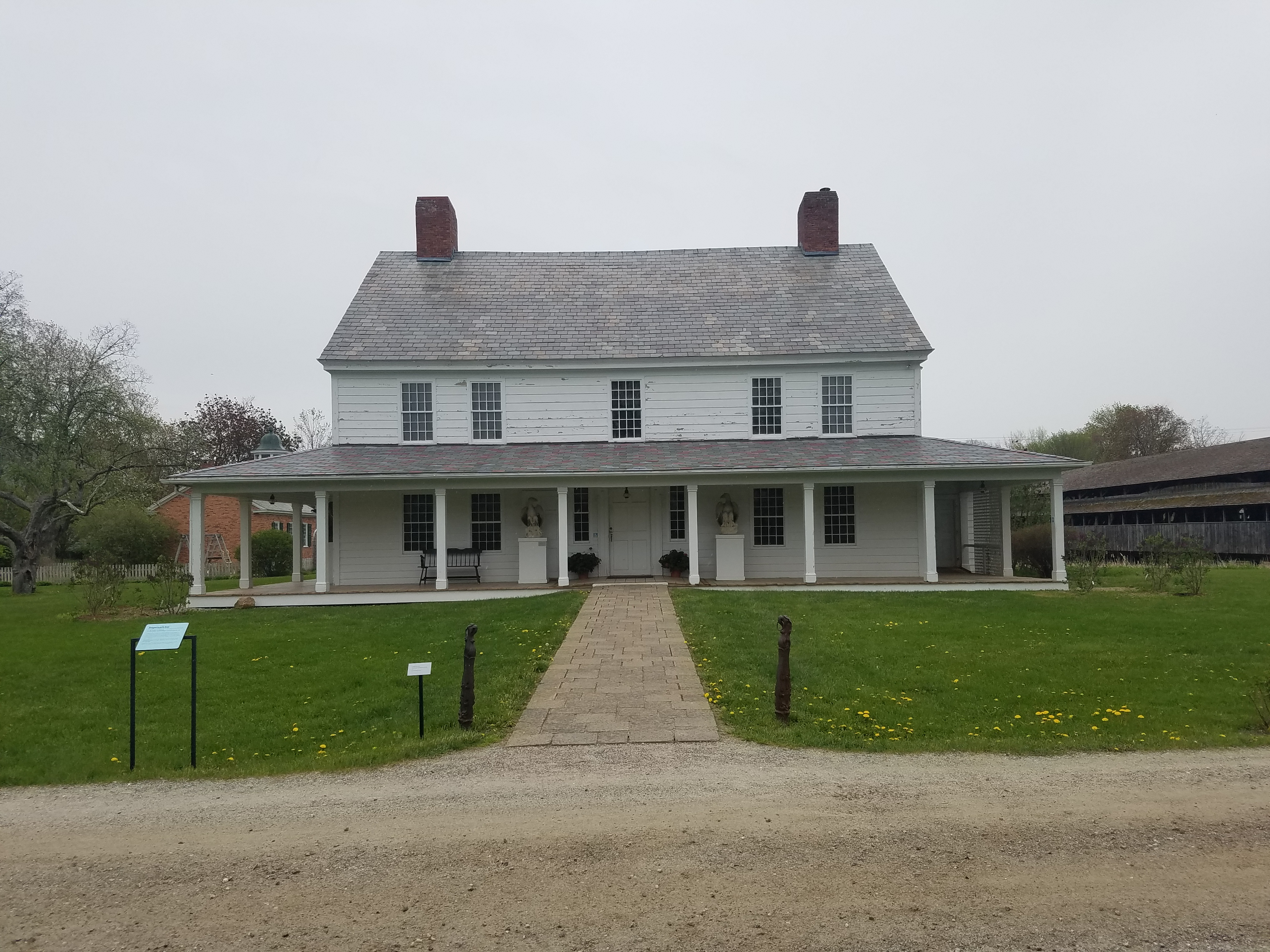

The Stagecoach Inn is an exhibit building located at Shelburne Museum in Shelburne, Vermont.

== History ==
Major General Hezekiah Barnes built the Stagecoach Inn in Charlotte, Vermont, in 1783. A former captain in the United States Militia, Barnes had moved with his family to Charlotte in 1780 and established the inn and a trading post on opposite sides of the main stage route from Montreal to southern New England.

Built on a Georgian plan, the Stagecoach Inn, which town residents referred to as the Tavern Stand, possesses regularly spaced windows and two central, side-lit doors that are distinctive elements of the vernacular Federal style popular in the eighteenth century.

=== Relocation ===
When the Shelburne Museum dismantled and reassembled the Stagecoach Inn on the grounds in 1949, it needed restoration. Museum contractors removed the dividing walls in the second-story ballroom, returning it to its former dimensions; they rebuilt ten fireplaces, two brick ovens, and two ham-smoking chambers; applied paneling and plaster finishes that approximated those found in New England in the late 18th century; and fashioned replacement window casings and chair rails with antique carpenter's planes. Finally, they reconstructed the broad porch that had originally wrapped around the building's exterior to re-create the inn's early appearance.

== Collection ==
=== Trade and tavern signs ===
Shelburne Museum's collection of over 175 trade signs represents dozens of different trades using a variety of forms, such as oversized locksmith's keys, optometrist's eyeglasses and skate-maker's skates, as well as an enormous cobbler's boot, a haberdasher's hat, a clockmaker's watch, and an innkeeper's pineapple. Samuel Anderson Robb's firm produced several of the museum's finest figures, including a caricature of Robb in his National Guard uniform. Inspired by the popular Civil War-era song "Captain Jinks of the Horse Marines", Thomas White, Robb's partner of many years, created the caricature as a tobacconist figure.

During the eighteenth and nineteenth centuries, trade signs advertised the variety of goods and services that craftspeople, merchants, and inn and tavern keepers offered. Many early craftspeople promoted their wares with oversized, three-dimensional metal or wooden representations of the objects they made or repaired. A gunsmith, for example, might hang a large gun outside his shop, while a dentist might exhibit a tooth. Inn and tavern keepers tended to favor flat, wooden signs that hung at a right angle to the building. These two-dimensional advertisements frequently combined a representational painting with the proprietor's name, and each side often displayed a different design.

Although a few craftsmen made their own signs, many turned to professional carvers and sign painters. During the nineteenth century most major cities supported dozens of woodcarvers and sign painters. In 1881, Samuel Robb of New York advertised his firm's services thus: "Manufacturing of show figures and lettered signs a specialty. Tobacconist signs in great variety, on hand and made to any design. Ship and steamboat carvings, eagles, scroll heads, block letters, shoe, dentist, and druggist signs, etc."

=== Weathervanes and whirligigs ===
Shelburne Museum's collection of 130 weathervanes includes finely crafted vanes as well as commercially produced examples. The tradition of surmounting buildings with weathervanes extends to antiquity when, as early as 100 BCE, a vane crowned the Athenian Tower of the Winds. Throughout the Medieval period, European churches displayed roosters, symbols of vigilance, from their bell towers. By the seventeenth century, English settlers had brought the tradition to America. In the United States, weathervanes first decorated public buildings but soon appeared across the countryside. Farmers would mount a representation of a cow, pig, or rooster on top of their barns to symbolize their trade, while horse breeders might cap their stables with a finely crafted racehorse.

Early weathervanes were often handmade, and the museum's wooden mermaid, carved by Warren Gould Roby of Wayland, Massachusetts, in about 1850, is a fine example of such hand-carved figures. Other handcrafted weathervanes include a Native American archer, a streamlined goose in flight, and a wooden rooster that originally stood on a barn in Bedford, Massachusetts.

In the second half of the nineteenth century, manufacturers began to sell commercially produced, copper weathervanes. Makers of these vanes would hammer copper sheeting into cast-iron molds copied from carved-wood patterns. Using a mold enabled manufacturers to reproduce each design many times. Shelburne's collection includes finished copper vanes, cast-iron molds, and a unique wooden pattern for a Lady Liberty weathervane. Many of the commercial weathervanes depict common barnyard animals, including roosters, horses, pigs, and cows. Others represent less familiar forms such as a centaur, a pouter pigeon, and an anvil. One of the largest known commercial weathervanes is a highly detailed fire-pumper pulled by a pair of horses, which originally topped a firehouse in Manchester, New Hampshire.

Whirligigs, which are closely related to weathervanes, most commonly represent a standing figure with paddled arms that flail in the wind. Some clever craftspeople built more complex whirligigs powered by a wind-catching wheel. One of Shelburne's finest represents a woman seated at a spinning wheel; doubling as a trade-sign, when the wind turned the spinning wheel, the woman's foot would move up and down on the treadle as if she were spinning yarn.

== Other ==
=== Stagecoaches ===
A stagecoach is a type of four-wheeled coach used for passengers and goods. They were strongly sprung and drawn by four horses. Stagecoaches were widely used before the introduction of railway transport and made regular trips between stages or stations, which were places of rest provided for stagecoach travelers. Shelburne Museum has examples of stagecoaches in their coach and wagon collection. See Horseshoe Barn and Annex for more information on this collection.

=== Stagecoach inns ===
Stagecoach inns served the traveling coach passengers. They stabled the teams of stagecoach horses, provided overnight loading, and served food and drink for weary travelers.
