= Holmes Creek Covered Bridge =

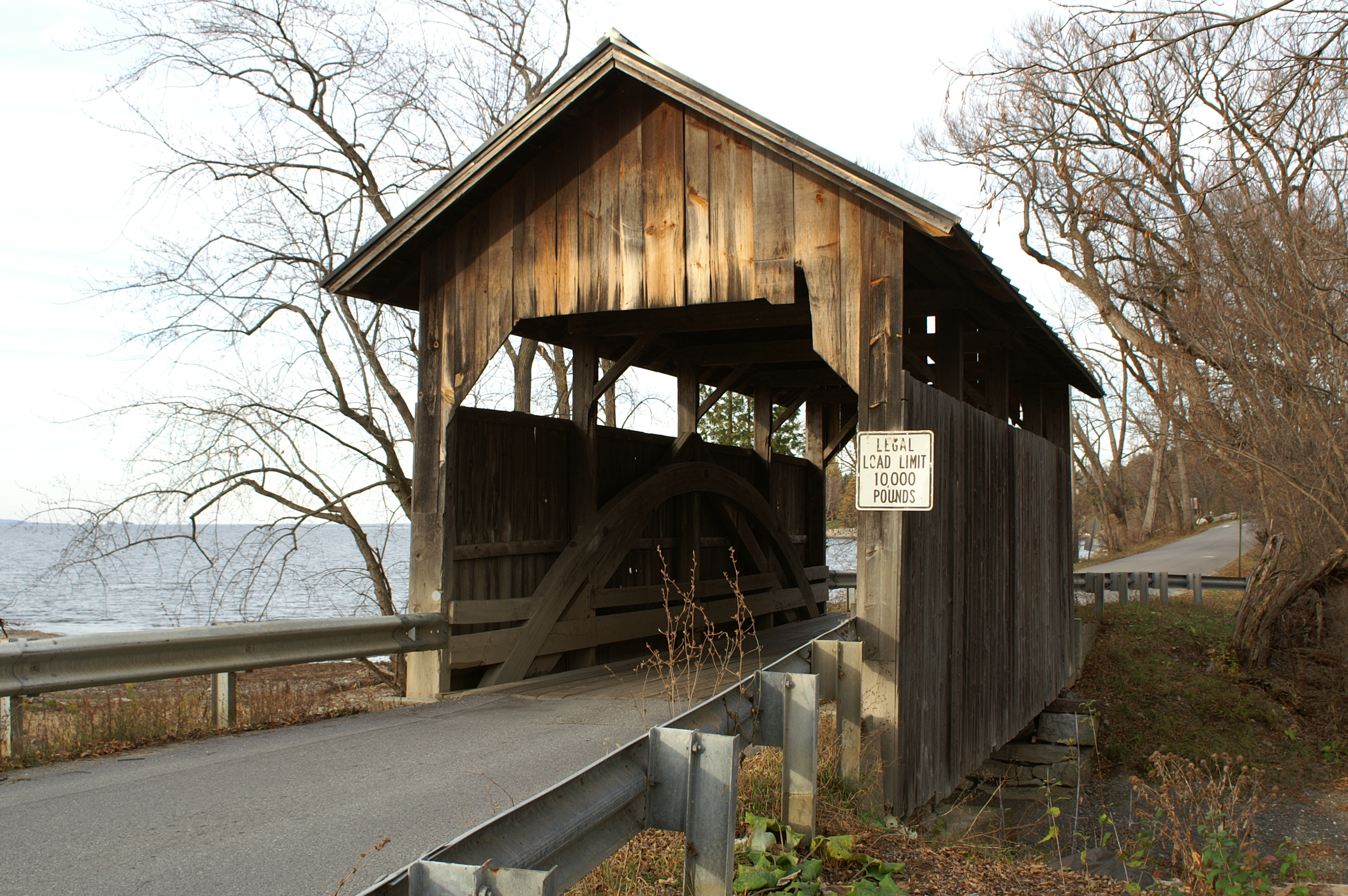
- Coordinates: 44°19′59″N 73°16′56″W
- Carries: Automobile
- Crosses: Holmes Creek
- Locale: Charlotte, Vermont
- Maintained by: Town of Charlotte
- ID number: VT-04-01

Characteristics
- Design: Covered, King post with tied arch
- Material: Wood
- Total length: 41 ft (12.50 m)
- Width: 12.1 ft (3.69 m)
- No. of spans: 1
- Load limit: 5 tons
- Clearance above: 8.25 ft (2.51 m)

History
- Constructed by: Leonard Sherman
- Construction end: ca 1870
- Holmes Creek Covered Bridge
- U.S. National Register of Historic Places
- Location within Vermont Location within the United States
- Coordinates: 44.33305°N 73.28232°W
- Area: 1 acre (0.4 ha)
- NRHP reference No.: 74000326
- Added to NRHP: September 6, 1974

The Holmes Creek Covered Bridge, also called the Lakeshore Covered Bridge, is a one-lane wooden covered bridge that crosses Holmes Creek in Charlotte, Vermont on Lake Road, adjacent to Charlotte Beach. It was listed on the National Register of Historic Places in 1974.

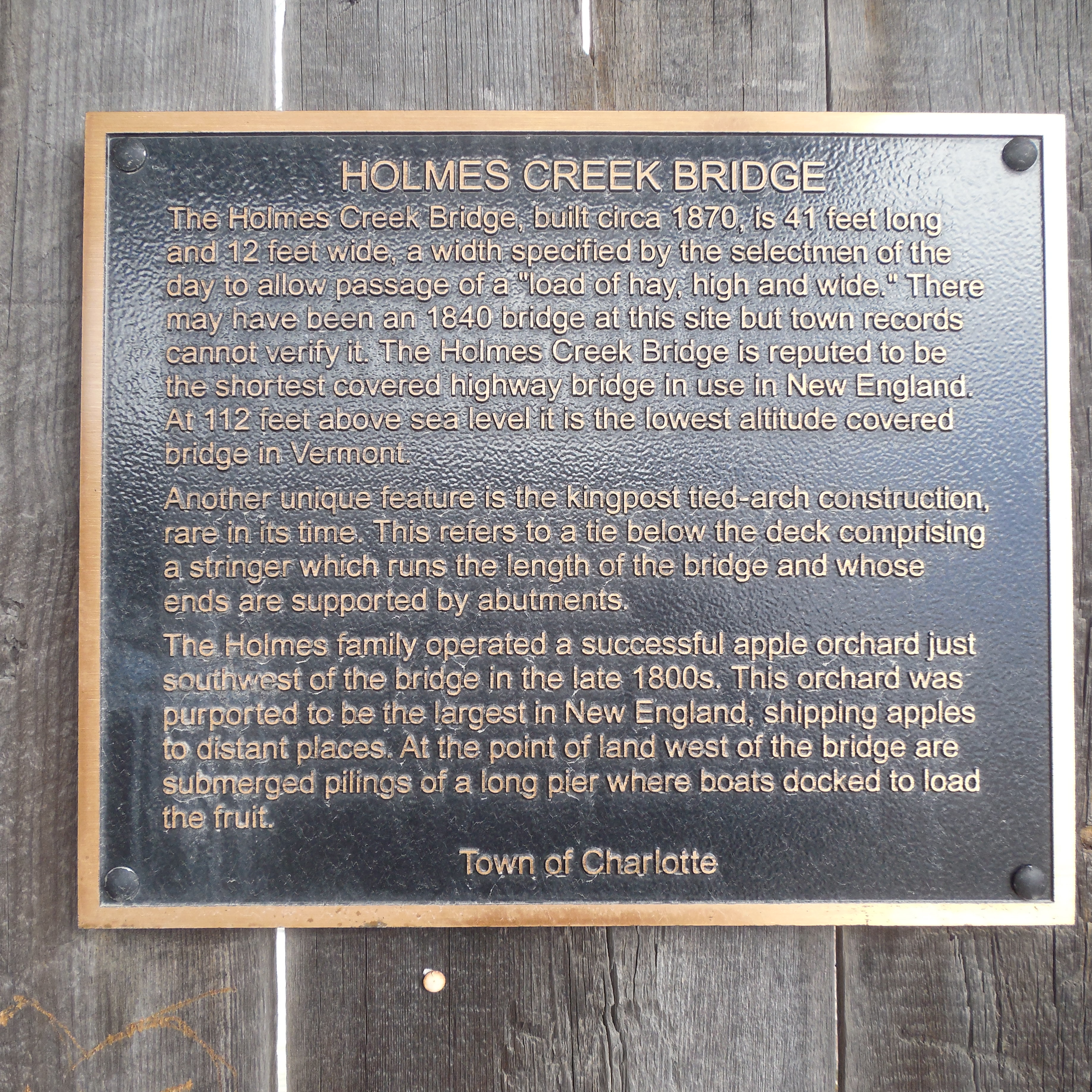
Holmes Creek Bridge information placard, Charlotte, VT: Apr 2015

The bridge is of King post truss with tied arch design, one of only 3 left standing in the state. This bridge is also one of the shortest in the state, and it at the lowest elevation being just off the shore of Lake Champlain.

According to the placard mounted on the bridge, the town Selectmen originally specified the bridge's width and height to accommodate passage of "a load of hay, high and wide."

During the late 1800s, the Holmes family operated what is said to be the largest apple orchard in New England, located just southwest of the bridge. Offshore in Lake Champlain there are submerged pilings; the only remaining evidence of the pier where boats docked to load the fruit.

== Recent history ==
In 1993 the bridge was rehabilitated by Milton Graton Associates, after the Vermont Agency of Transportation (AOT) found it to be inadequate for normal loading. Additional work was done in 1994 by Paul Ide and Jan Lewandoski. The Vermont AOT has further recommended bypassing the bridge, but thus far it is still in daily use.

In 2002, the bridge had undergone a roof replacement funded by the National Historic Covered Bridge Preservation Program, which re-roofed 38 covered bridges within the State

The July 2007 Town of Charlotte Selectboard minutes have stated that the Holmes Creek Bridge has been hit by an untold number of small trucks, where the Town has had to pay for the repairs. The current height restriction for vehicles traveling on the bridge is posted at 8'3".

== Photo gallery ==
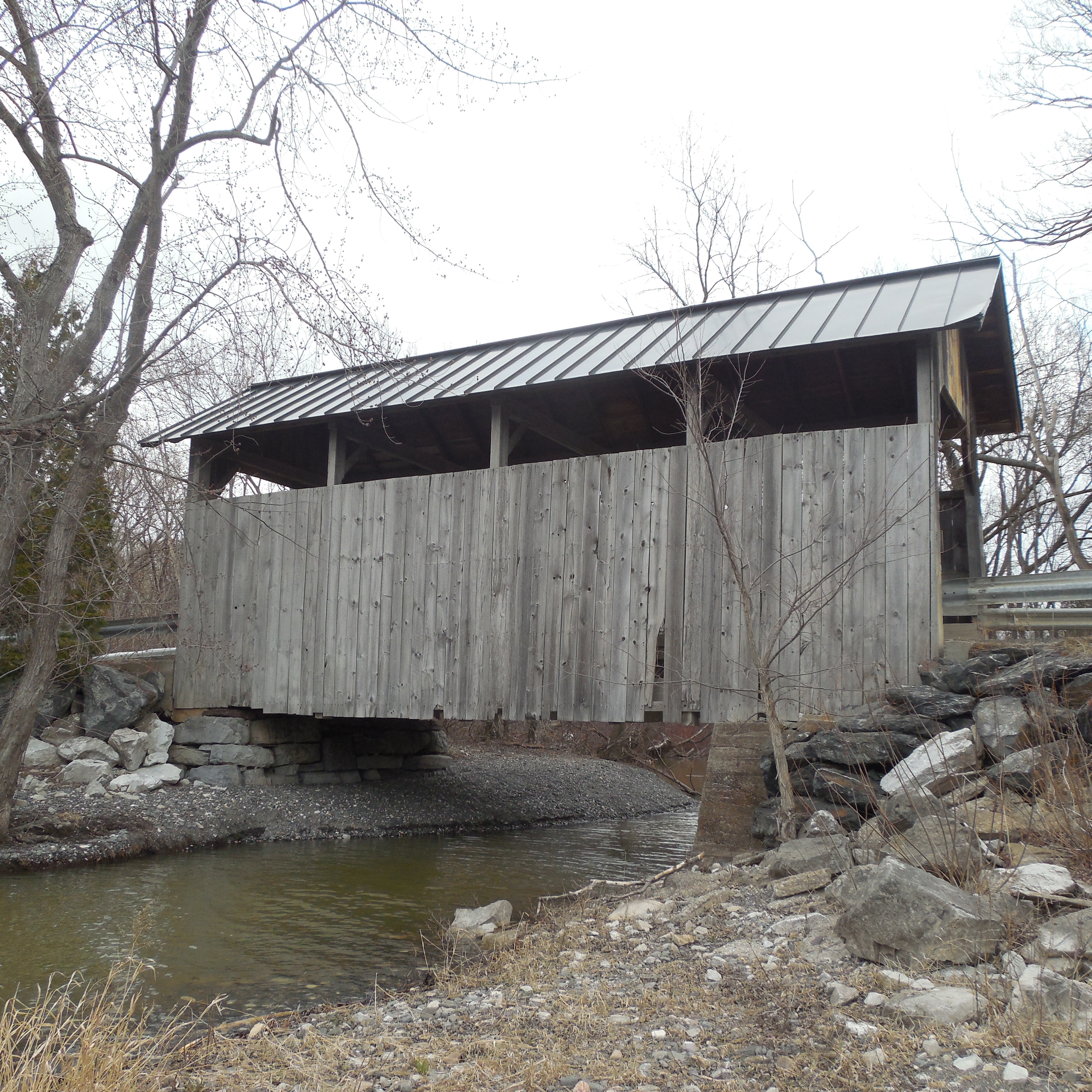
Holmes Creek Covered Bridge on Lake Rd., Charlotte, VT (Looking West toward Lake Champlain): 26 Apr 2015

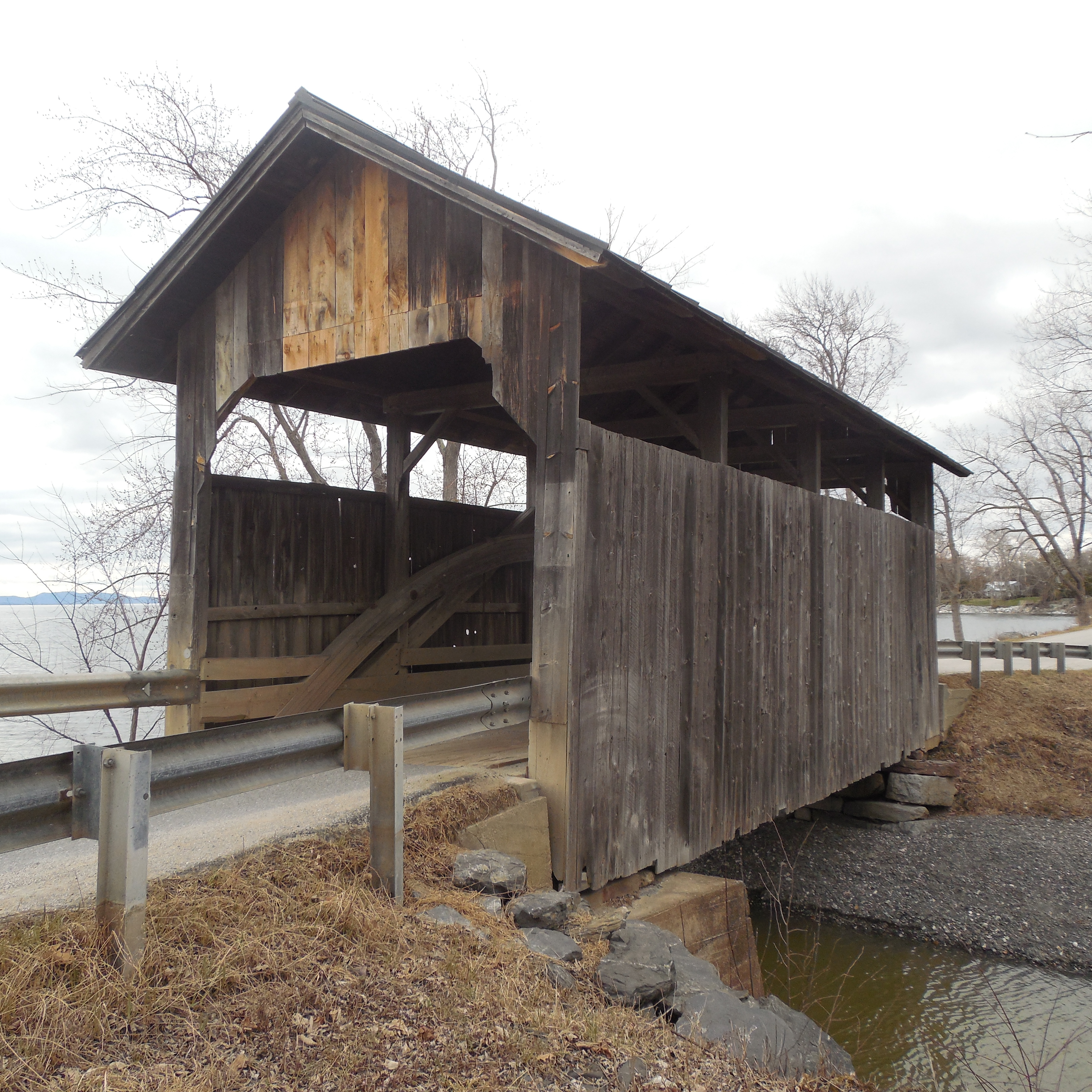
Holmes Creek Covered Bridge on Lake Rd., Charlotte, VT (Looking North): 26 Apr 2015

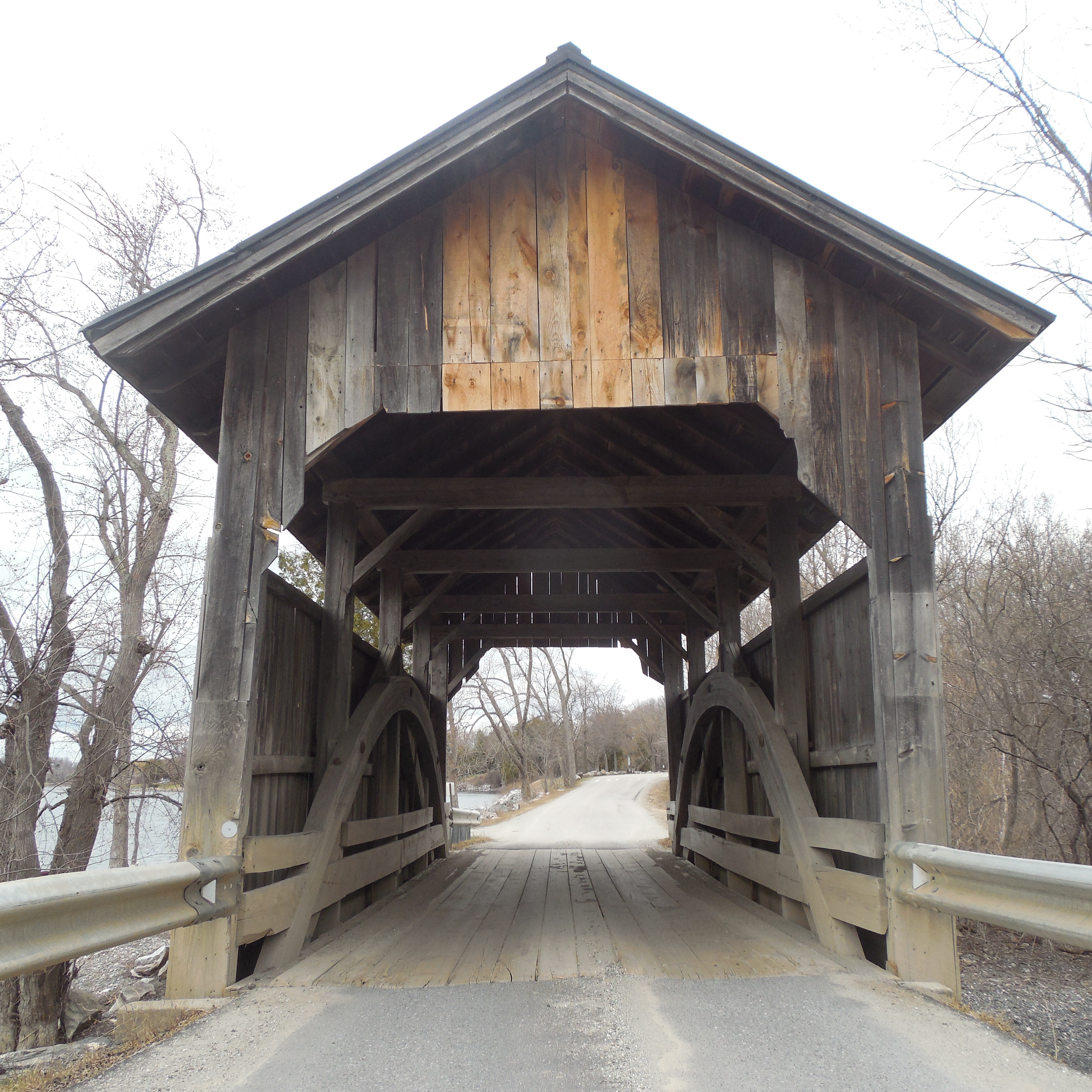
Holmes Creek Covered Bridge, Charlotte, VT (Looking North): 26 Apr 2015

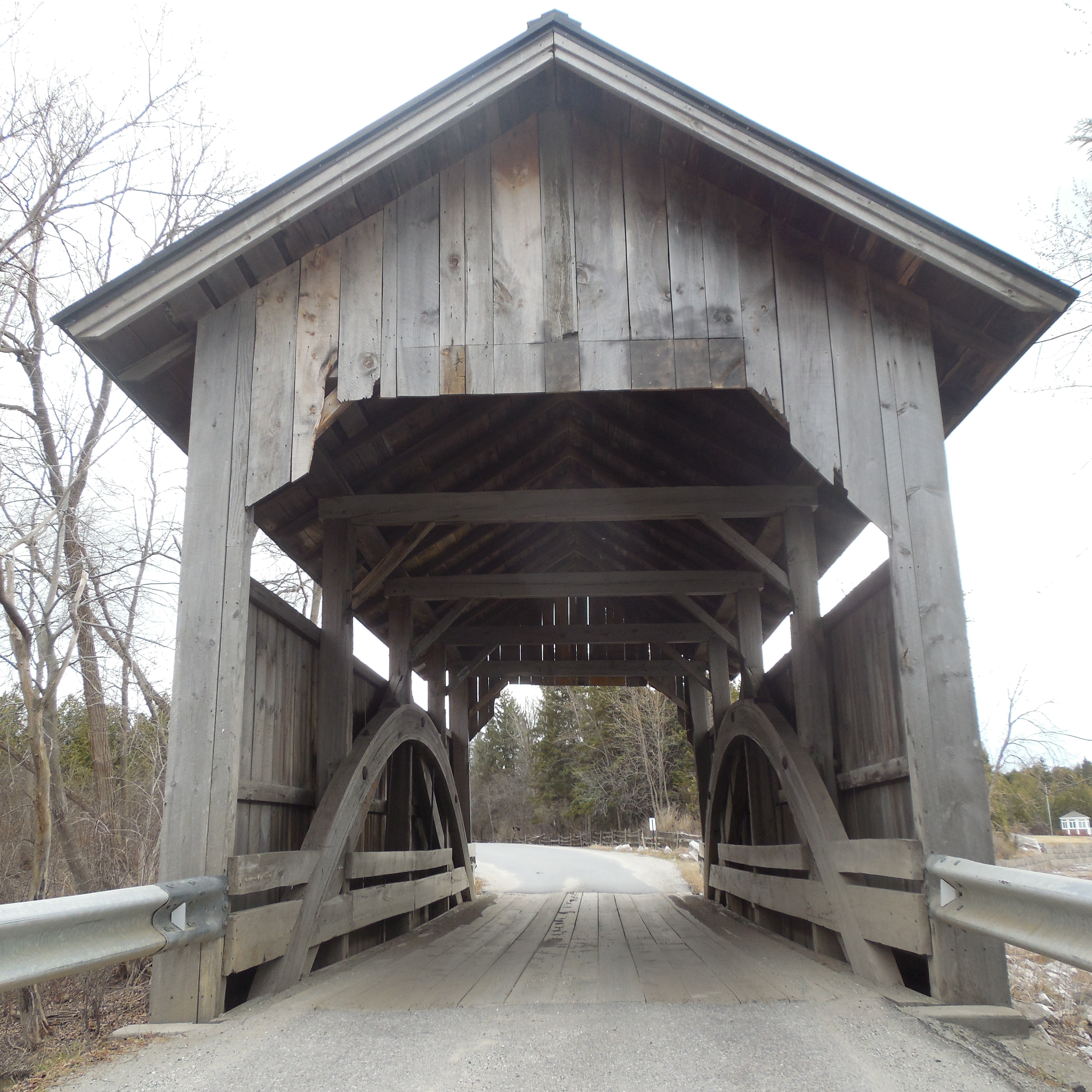
Holmes Creek Covered Bridge, Charlotte, VT (Looking South): 26 Apr 2015

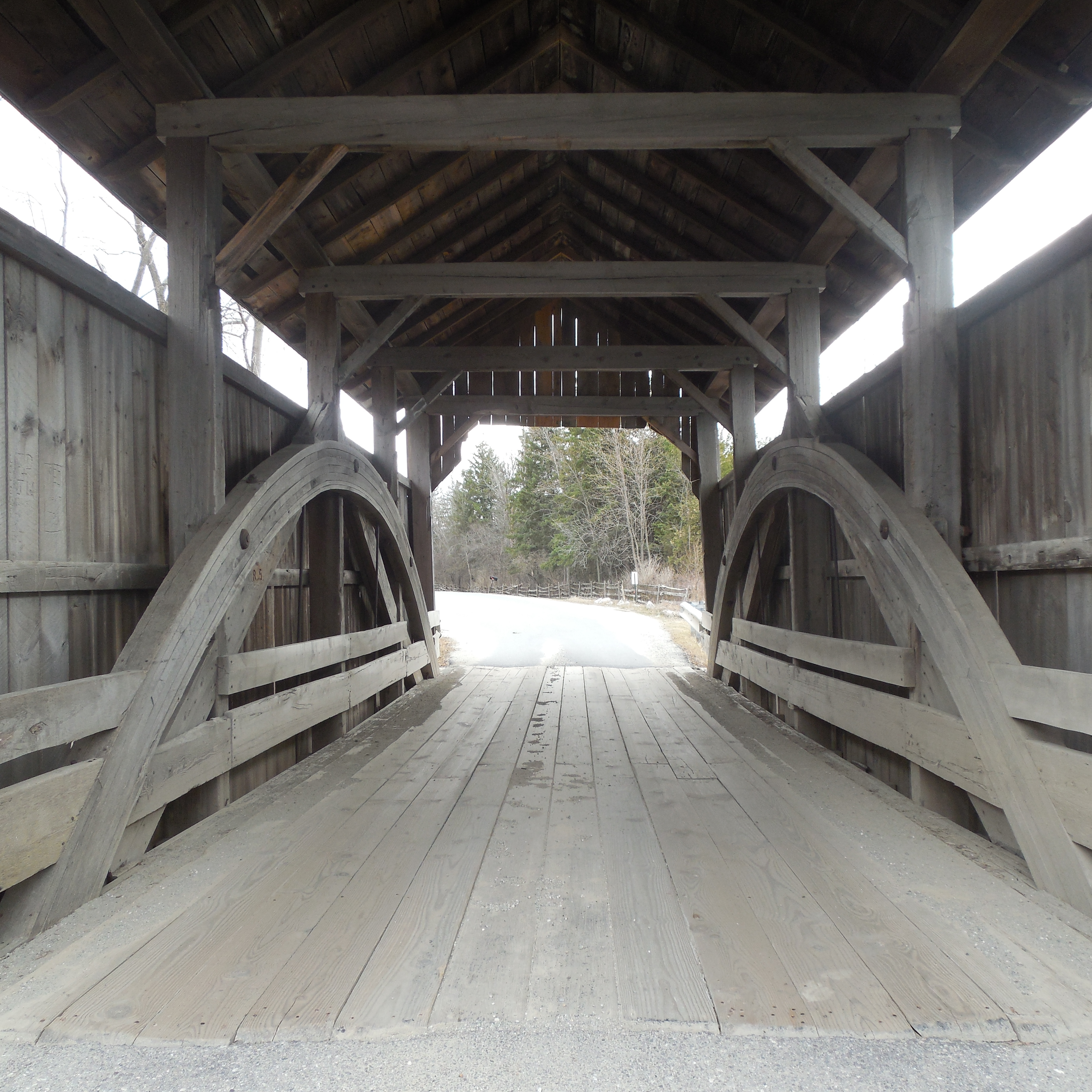
Holmes Creek Covered Bridge Trusses, Charlotte, VT (Looking toward South): 26 Apr 2015

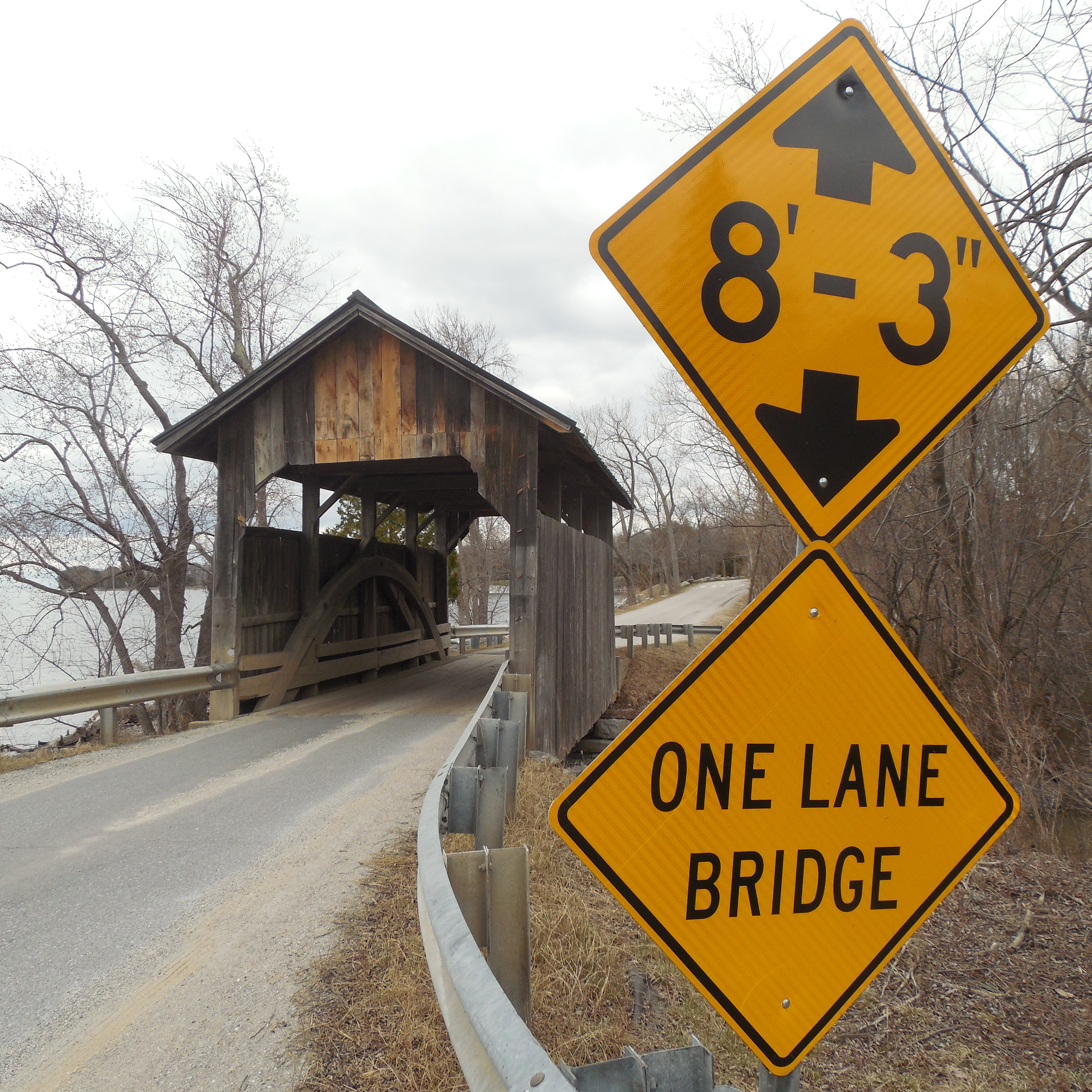
Signage posted ahead of the Holmes Creek Bridge on Lake Rd., Charlotte, VT (looking North)

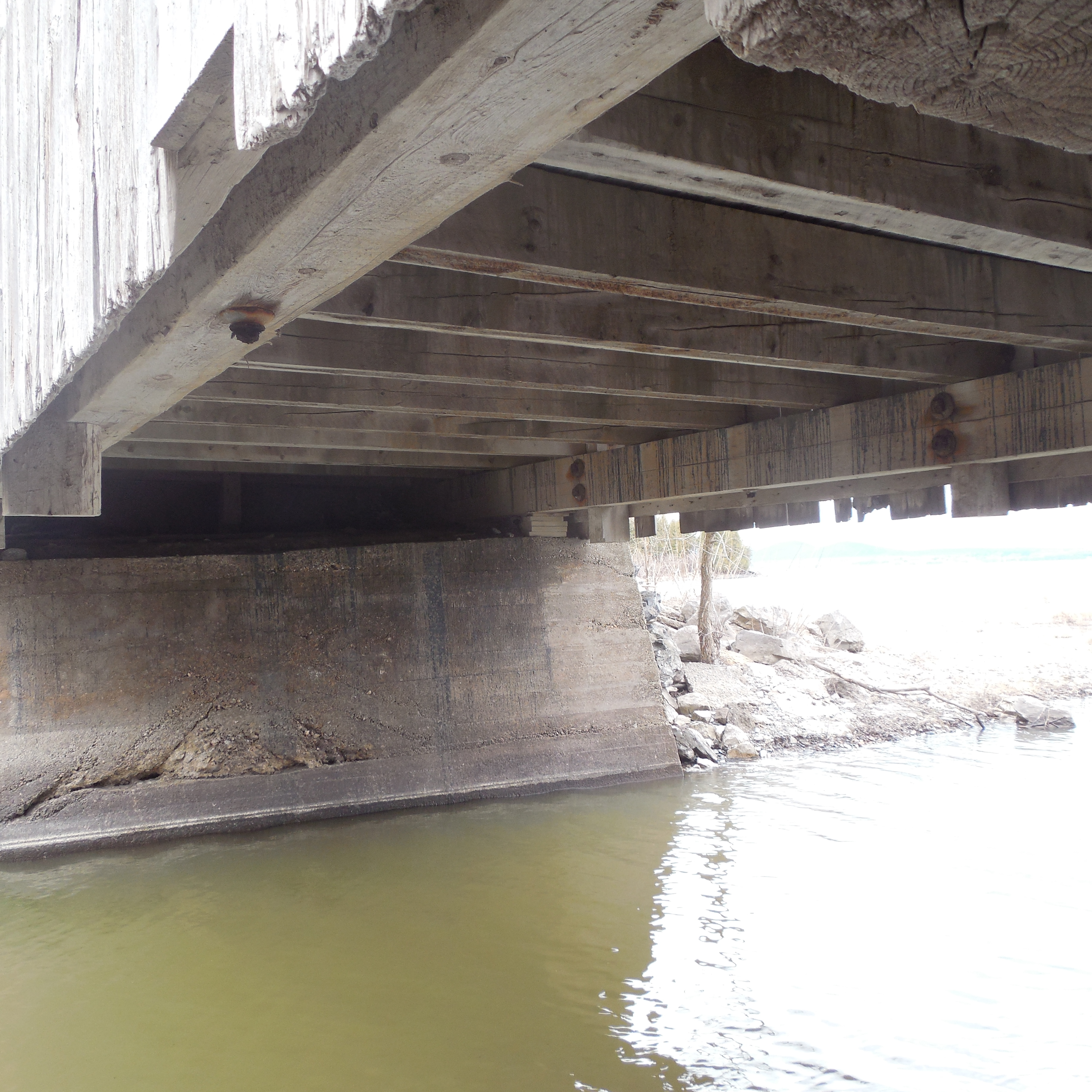
Holmes Creek Covered Bridge Spans & southern abutment, Charlotte, VT (Looking toward Lake Champlain): 26 Apr 2015

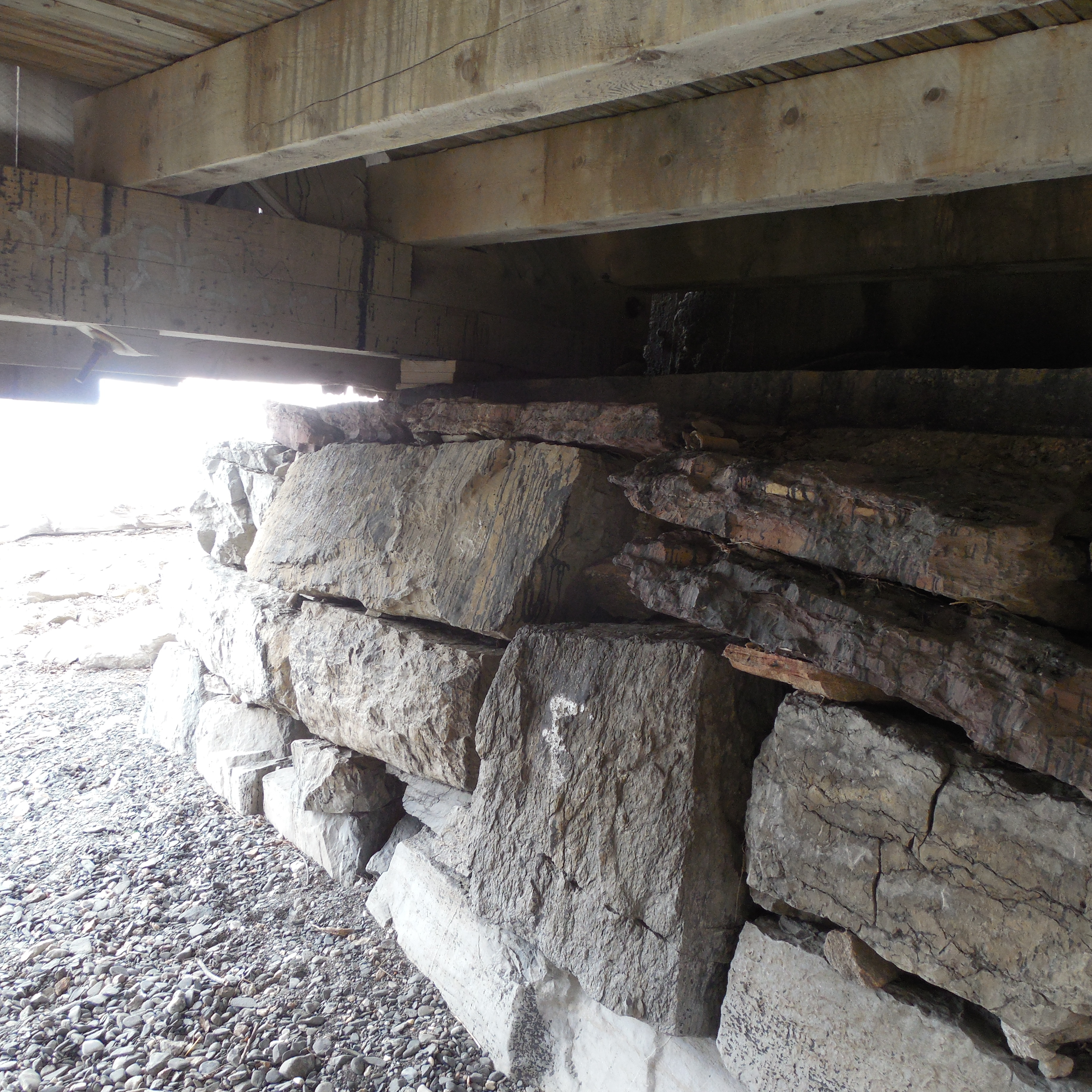
Northern bridge abutment of the Holmes Creek Covered Bridge, Charlotte, VT: 26 Apr 2015

== See also ==
- National Register of Historic Places listings in Chittenden County, Vermont
- List of Vermont covered bridges
- List of bridges on the National Register of Historic Places in Vermont
