= Mount Philo State Park =

State park in Chittenden County, Vermont

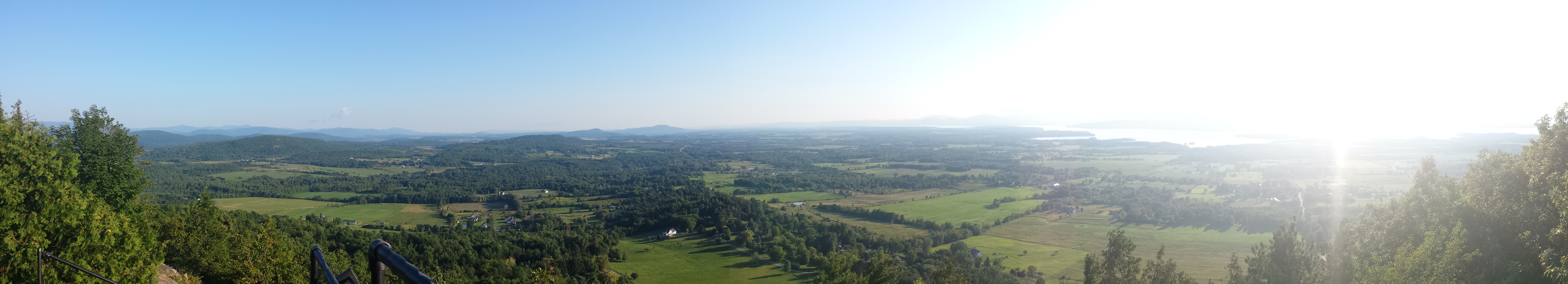
- Panoramic of the Adirondack Mountains and Lake Champlain seen from the Mt. Philo summit overlook
- Interactive map of Mount Philo State Park
- Type: State park
- Location: 5425 Mount Philo Rd. Charlotte, Vermont
- Coordinates: 44.2781°N 73.2148°W
- Area: 237-acre (0.96 km^{2})
- Created: 1924
- Operator: Vermont Department of Forests, Parks, and Recreation
- Open: Memorial Day weekend - Columbus Day weekend
- Website: https://vtstateparks.com/philo.html
- Mount Philo State Park
- U.S. National Register of Historic Places
- U.S. Historic district
- MPS: Historic Park Landscapes in National and State Parks MPS
- NRHP reference No.: 01001286
- Added to NRHP: November 29, 2001

Mount Philo State Park is a state park located in Charlotte, Vermont. The 237-acre (0.96 km^{2}) park protects the area around Mount Philo (968 feet high) and provides views of Lake Champlain and the Adirondack Mountains to the west. The Green Mountains (including Camel's Hump in the winter) can be seen to the east and south. It is accessed by trail or steep narrow road (seasonal).

== Features ==
The park features hiking trails that lead from the base to the summit of Mount Philo. There is a mountaintop picnic area with views of Lake Champlain, the valley, and the Adirondack Mountains and Green Mountains to the west and south.

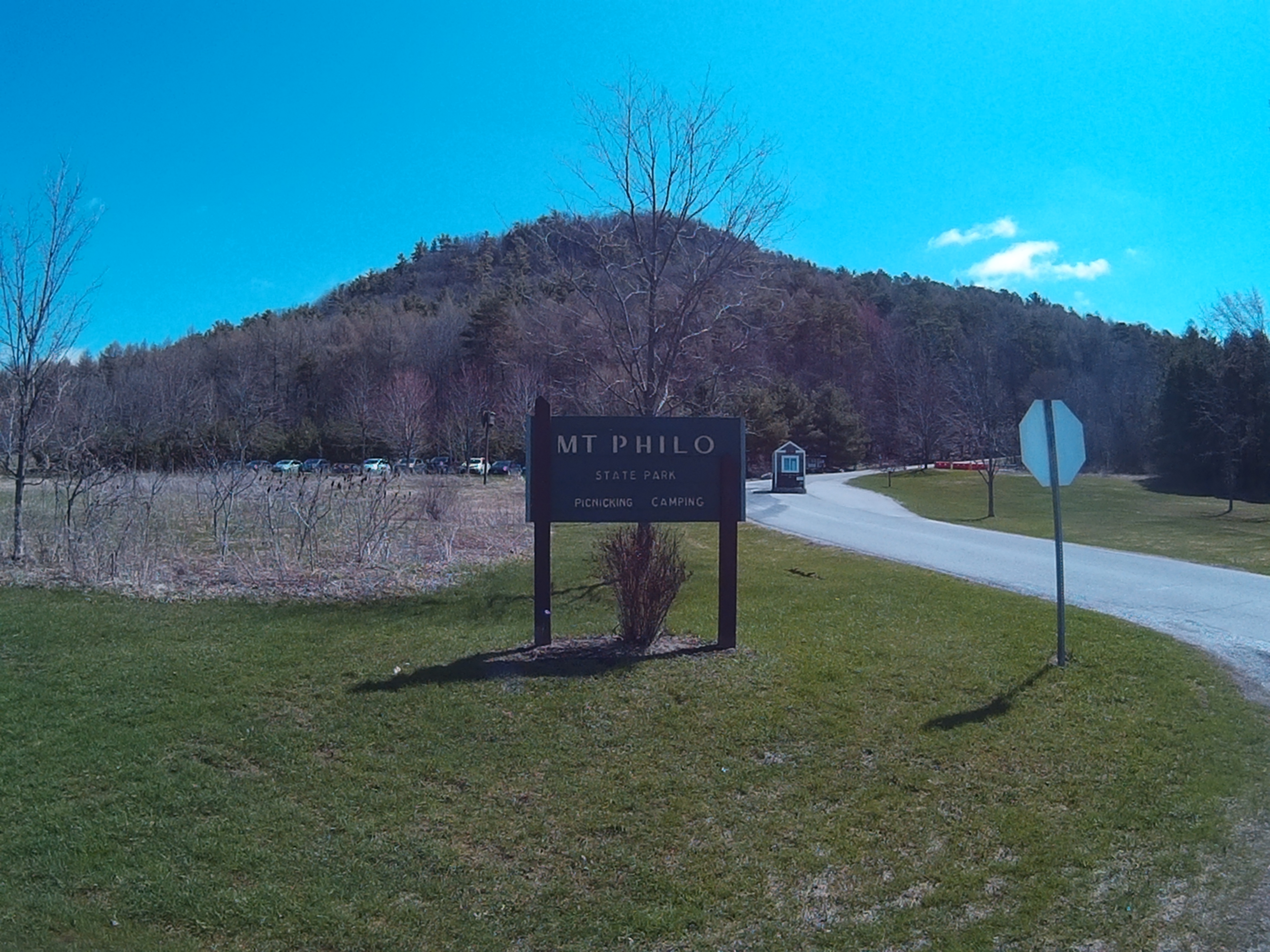
The entrance of Mount Philo State Park with the mountain in the background.

There is a small camping area with a total of 10 sites including 3 lean-tos, with restrooms and hot showers.

== History ==
From the late 19th century to 1924, Mt. Philo was a popular destination for guests of the Mt. Philo Inn. It was accessed by carriage road and had a wooden observation tower at its summit.

The park was established in 1924 when Francis Humphreys of Brookline, Massachusetts, owner of the adjacent Mt. Philo Inn, donated the land to the State of Vermont for recreational use. This land would become Vermont's first state park. In 1929, the carriage road was improved and a summit picnic area was created. From 1935-1937, CCC (Civilian Conservation Corps) crews further enhanced the road and picnic area and built a ranger cabin and camping sites. The park was listed on the National Register of Historic Places in 2001 for its importance in the state's recreational history, and for its CCC-related architecture.

== Biology ==
From September to November, Mt. Philo is an excellent viewpoint for migrating raptors. Three main types can be viewed: falcons such as the kestrel and merlin; accipiters such as the cooper's hawk; and buteos such as the red-tailed hawk.

== Geology ==
Mt. Philo sits atop the Champlain Thrust fault of Middle Ordivician age. It is a Klippe made up of difficult to weather sedimentary rocks—the Cambrian Monkton Quartzites—that are thrust over younger Ordovician rocks of the Stony Point Formation. The rocks that hold up Mt. Philo were originally deposited during the Cambrian on a passive margin in a warm shallow marine shelf setting along the east coast of Laurentia (Proto North America). These rocks have subsequently been thrust west during the Taconic Orogeny (~450 Ma) and perhaps again during the Acadian Orogeny (~350 Ma).

== See also ==
- National Register of Historic Places listings in Chittenden County, Vermont
