= McNeil Homestead =

Historic house in Vermont, United States

- U.S. National Register of Historic Places
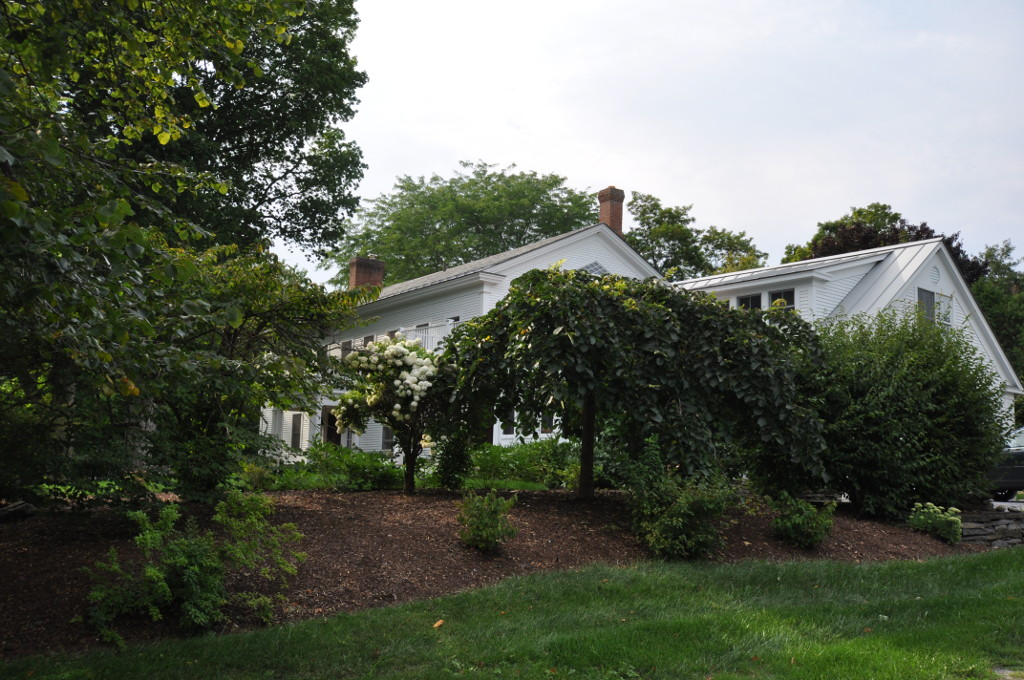

- Location within Vermont Location within the United States
- Location: Wings Point Rd., Charlotte, Vermont
- Coordinates: 44°18′12″N 73°18′5″W
- Area: 7 acres (2.8 ha)
- Built: 1800; 226 years ago
- Architectural style: Greek Revival, Federal
- NRHP reference No.: 82001700
- Added to NRHP: June 17, 1982

The McNeil Homestead is a historic ferry-related property off Wings Point Road in Charlotte, Vermont, USA. The complex includes a 19th-century house, former tavern, and barn, all built by members of the McNeil family, the first operators of the Charlotte-Essex Ferry, whose eastern terminus is just south of the property. It was listed on the National Register of Historic Places in 1982.

== Description and history ==
The McNeil property occupies the southwestern part of Wings Point, a westward projection into Lake Champlain that forms the northern boundary of McNeil's Cove, the bay from which the ferry service between Charlotte and Essex, New York, runs. Oriented facing south toward the cove are a c. 1800 Federal period wood-frame house and an 1830 Greek Revival tavern, now used as a residence. To the north of the house stands a barn with an estimated construction date of 1850.

John McNeil settled this area in 1787, moving here from Tinmouth, where he had lost property during the American Revolutionary War due to his supposed Loyalist sympathies. He quickly became a prominent local citizen, serving in town offices and the state legislature. He inaugurated the ferry service in 1790. It was the first cross-lake service and is still a vital transportation link despite improvements in other transportation options. It was a highly lucrative operation in the first half of the 19th century, and McNeil's son built the tavern in 1830 to serve the passenger trade. Freight business declined on the route due to expanding railroad networks and the McNeils returned to farming as a primary activity.

== See also ==
- National Register of Historic Places listings in Chittenden County, Vermont
