= East Charlotte, Vermont =

Census-designated place in Vermont, United States

- Census-designated place
- Location within Vermont Location within the United States
- Coordinates: 44°19′06″N 73°11′27″W
- Country: United States
- State: Vermont
- County: Chittenden
- Town: Charlotte

Area
  - Total: 0.42 sq mi (1.10 km^{2})
  - Land: 0.42 sq mi (1.10 km^{2})
  - Water: 0 sq mi (0.0 km^{2})
- Elevation: 407 ft (124 m)
- Time zone: UTC-5 (Eastern (EST))
  - Summer (DST): UTC-4 (EDT)
- ZIP Code: 05445 (Charlotte)
- Area code: 802
- FIPS code: 50-19975
- GNIS feature ID: 2807133

East Charlotte is an unincorporated village and census-designated place (CDP) in the town of Charlotte, Chittenden County, Vermont, United States. It was first listed as a CDP prior to the 2020 census. As of the 2020 census, East Charlotte had a population of 169.

== Geography ==
The village is in southwestern Chittenden County, in the eastern part of the town of Charlotte, at the intersection of Hinesburg Road and Spear Street. It is 3 miles (5 km) east of West Charlotte, 4 miles (6 km) west of Hinesburg, and 5 miles (8 km) south of Shelburne.
