= Charlotte Center Historic District =

Historic district in Vermont, United States

- U.S. National Register of Historic Places
- U.S. Historic district
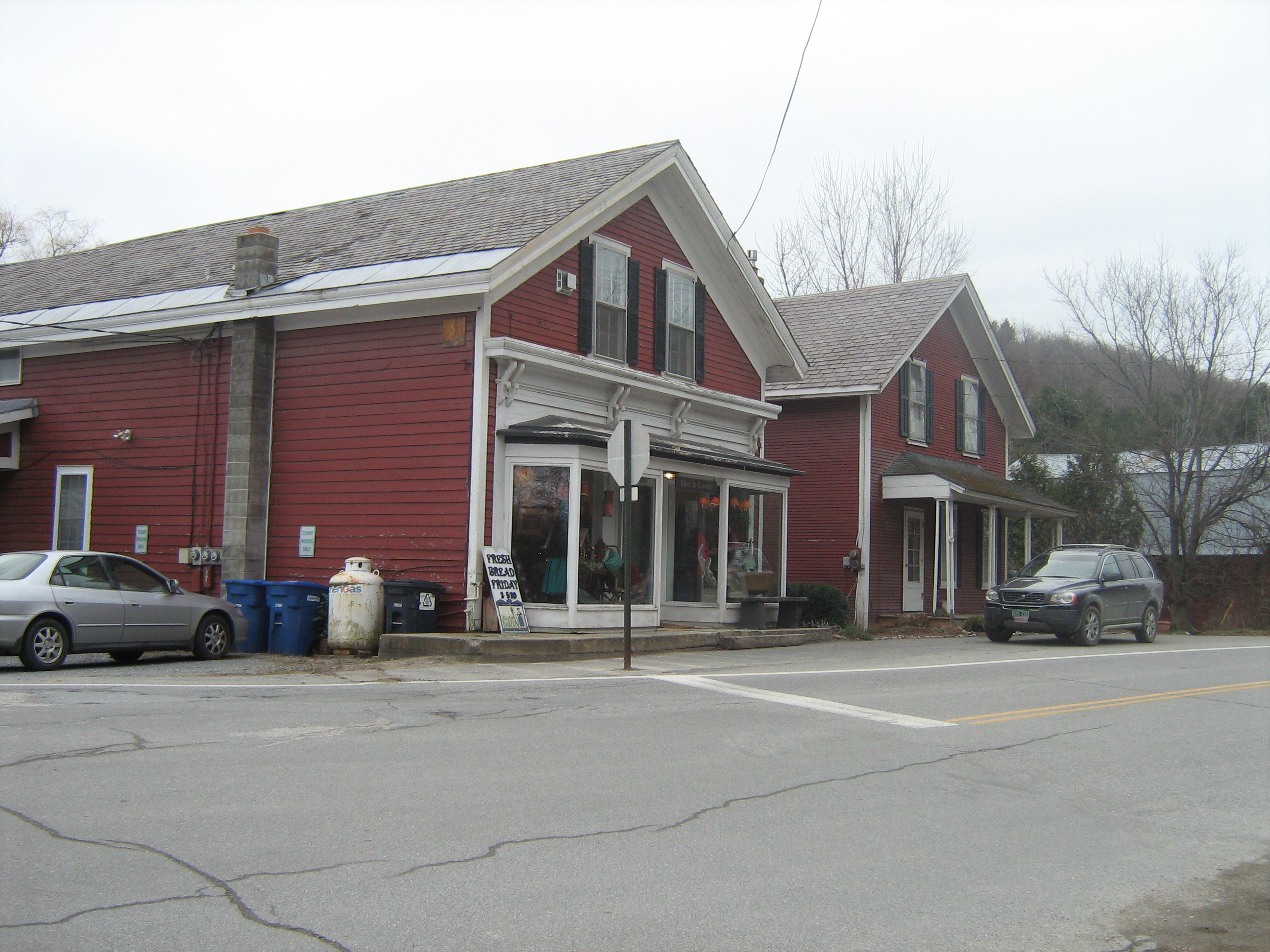

- Location within Vermont Location within the United States
- Location: Church Hill and Hinesburg Rds., Charlotte, Vermont
- Coordinates: 44°18′52″N 73°14′23″W
- Area: 27 acres (11 ha)
- Built: 1790
- Architect: Multiple
- Architectural style: Mid 19th Century Revival, Late Victorian
- NRHP reference No.: 84003460
- Added to NRHP: July 19, 1984

The Charlotte Center Historic District encompasses the historic 19th-century town center of Charlotte, Vermont. Settled c. 1790 and developed mainly in the mid-19th century, the village, stretched along Church Hill Road west of Hinesburg Road, retains a well-preserved 19th-century atmosphere of residential, civic, and commercial buildings. The district was listed on the National Register of Historic Places in 1984.

== Description and history ==
The town of Charlotte was chartered in 1762, but not settled until c. 1784, after the American Revolutionary War. By tradition, a stake was placed at the town's geographic center, and that is where the village of Charlotte Center arose. It was located on the area's major north–south route (now bypassed by the modern alignment of United States Route 7) running east–west between two hills. It developed as a stop on the stagecoach route between Burlington and Troy, New York when Hezekiah Barnes, the village's first settler, built a tavern in 1800. The village was the principal civic and commercial area of the town until the construction of the Central Vermont Railroad bypassed it, after which commercial and political activity was largely removed to Charlotte Four Corners, where the railroad station was located.

The historic district extends westward in a linear fashion along Church Hill Road, the former stagecoach route and one-time alignment of US 7, from its junction with Hinesburg Road. Its dominant features are the 1851 Greek Revival Congregational Church, and the 1850 former Town Hall, now the local museum. Most of the buildings are of wood frame construction, and were built before 1860. The only stone house, a Cape style structure, was built by Hezekiah Barnes about 1790 near his tavern (which no longer stands, but whose site is marked). The dispersed district also includes several barns from the early 20th century, as well as one believed to have been built by Barnes about the same time as the stone house.

== See also ==
- National Register of Historic Places listings in Chittenden County, Vermont
- Charlotte Congregational Church
