= Seguin Covered Bridge =

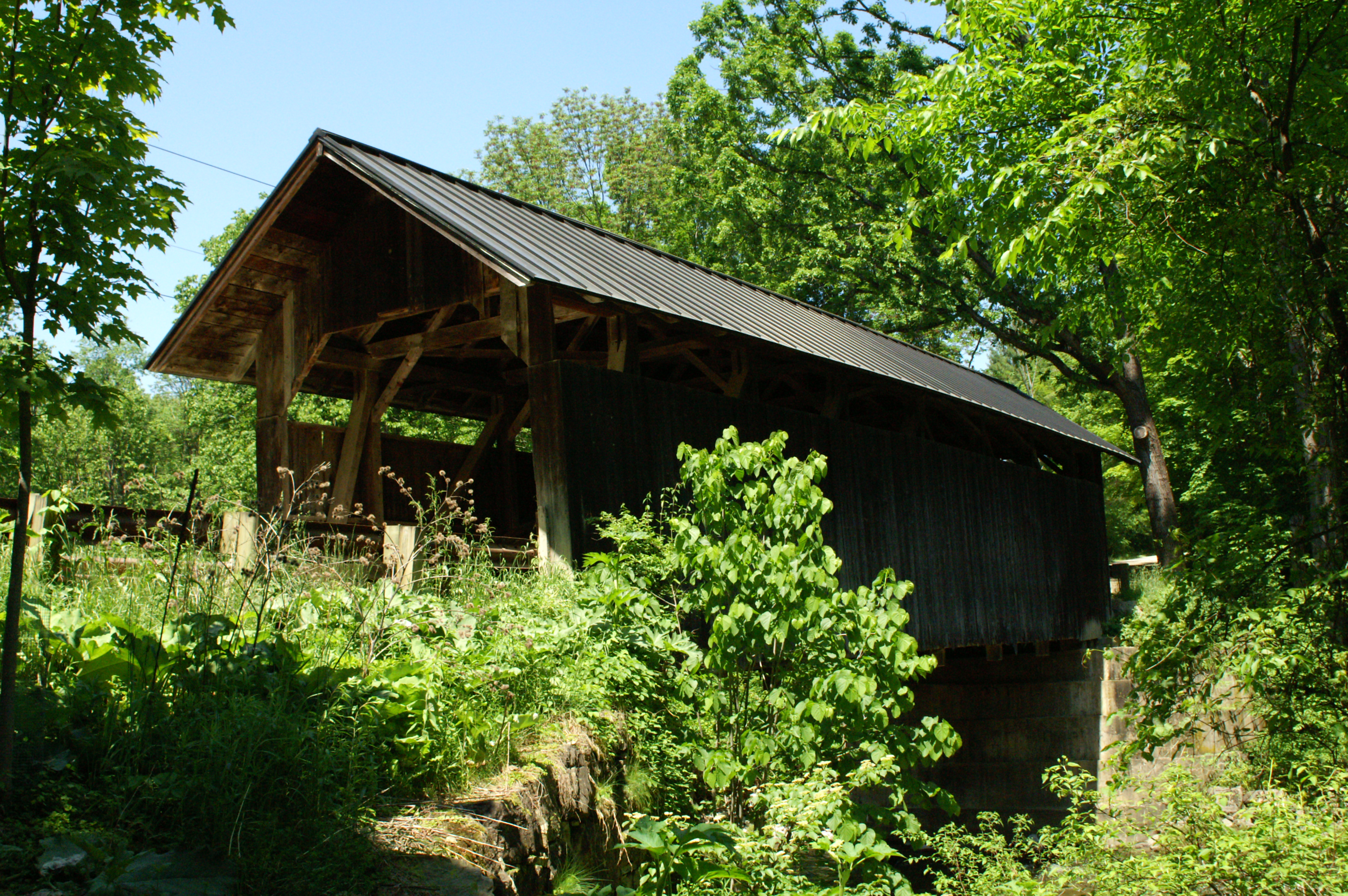
- Bridge in U.S. state of Vermont
- Coordinates: 44°17′20″N 73°09′00″W
- Carries: Automobile
- Crosses: Lewis Creek
- Locale: Charlotte, Vermont
- Maintained by: Town of Charlotte
- ID number: VT-04-02

Characteristics
- Design: Covered, Burr arch
- Material: Wood
- Total length: 70.5 ft (21.49 m)
- Width: 13.25 ft (4.04 m)
- No. of spans: 1
- Clearance above: 10.1 ft (3.08 m)

History
- Constructed by: unknown
- Construction end: ca 1850
- Seguin Covered Bridge
- U.S. National Register of Historic Places
- Location within Vermont Location within the United States
- Coordinates: 44°17′20″N 73°09′00″W
- Area: 1 acre (0.4 ha)
- NRHP reference No.: 74000209
- Added to NRHP: September 6, 1974

The Seguin Covered Bridge, also called the Upper Covered Bridge and the Sequin Covered Bridge, is a wooden covered bridge that crosses Lewis Creek in Charlotte, Vermont on Roscoe Road. It was built about 1850, and is a distinctive variant of a Burr arch design. It was listed on the National Register of Historic Places in 1974.

== Naming ==
A sign posted in the bridge by the Town of Charlotte identifies the name of the bridge as "Seguin" (with a letter "G") for one of the families who owned land surrounding it. It was listed on the National Register as "Sequin" (with the letter "Q"), an error that has since propagated widely.

== Description ==
The Seguin Covered Bridge stands in a rural area of eastern Charlotte, spanning the west-flowing Lewis Creek in a north-south orientation on Roscoe Road. The bridge is a single-span Burr arch design, 71 feet (22 m) long and 16.5 feet (5.0 m) wide, with a roadway width of 13 feet (4.0 m) (one lane). It rests on stone abutments that have been mortared and faced in concrete. The trusses consist of vertical posts and diagonal bracing, flanked on either side by laminated arches. The exterior is finished in vertical board siding, which extends around to the insides of the portals. The siding ends short of the gabled roof, leaving an opening between the two.

== History ==
The bridge was built about 1850 by an unknown builder; it is one of three surviving covered bridges in the town of Charlotte, and one of nine in the state with the Burr arch design. Extensive repairs were made in 1949 and again in 1994; the latter repairs being made by Paul Ide and Jan Lewandoski. A new roof was added in 2001.

The bridge underwent a major rehabilitation in 2016. This work raised concerns among bridge preservationists, as it included alterations that put at risk the bridge's distinctive overhead bracing, which is not found on other bridges in the state. Alterations also include rebuilding the road deck to increase the weight limit to seven tons (from the previous five).

== See also ==
- National Register of Historic Places listings in Chittenden County, Vermont
- List of Vermont covered bridges
- List of bridges on the National Register of Historic Places in Vermont
