= Charlotte, Vermont =

- Town
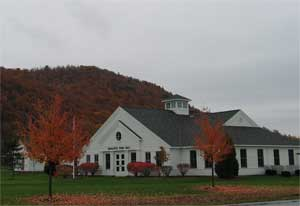
- Charlotte town hall

- Logo

- Location in Chittenden County and the state of Vermont
- Coordinates: 44°18′38″N 73°14′59″W
- Country: United States
- State: Vermont
- County: Chittenden
- Communities: Cedar Beach; East Charlotte; Prindle Corners; West Charlotte

Area
  - Total: 50.3 sq mi (130.4 km^{2})
  - Land: 41.3 sq mi (106.9 km^{2})
  - Water: 9.1 sq mi (23.6 km^{2})
- Elevation: 610 ft (190 m)

Population (2020)
  - Total: 3,912
  - Density: 95/sq mi (36.6/km^{2})
- Time zone: UTC-5 (Eastern (EST))
  - Summer (DST): UTC-4 (EDT)
- ZIP code: 05445
- Area code: 802
- FIPS code: 50-13300
- GNIS feature ID: 1462068
- Website: www.charlottevt.org

Charlotte /ʃɑːrˈlɒt/ is a town in Chittenden County, Vermont, United States. The town was named for Queen Charlotte, though unlike Charlotte, North Carolina, Charlottesville, Virginia, and other cities and towns that bear her name, the town's name is pronounced with the accent on the second syllable. The population of the town was 3,912 at the 2020 census.

== Geography ==
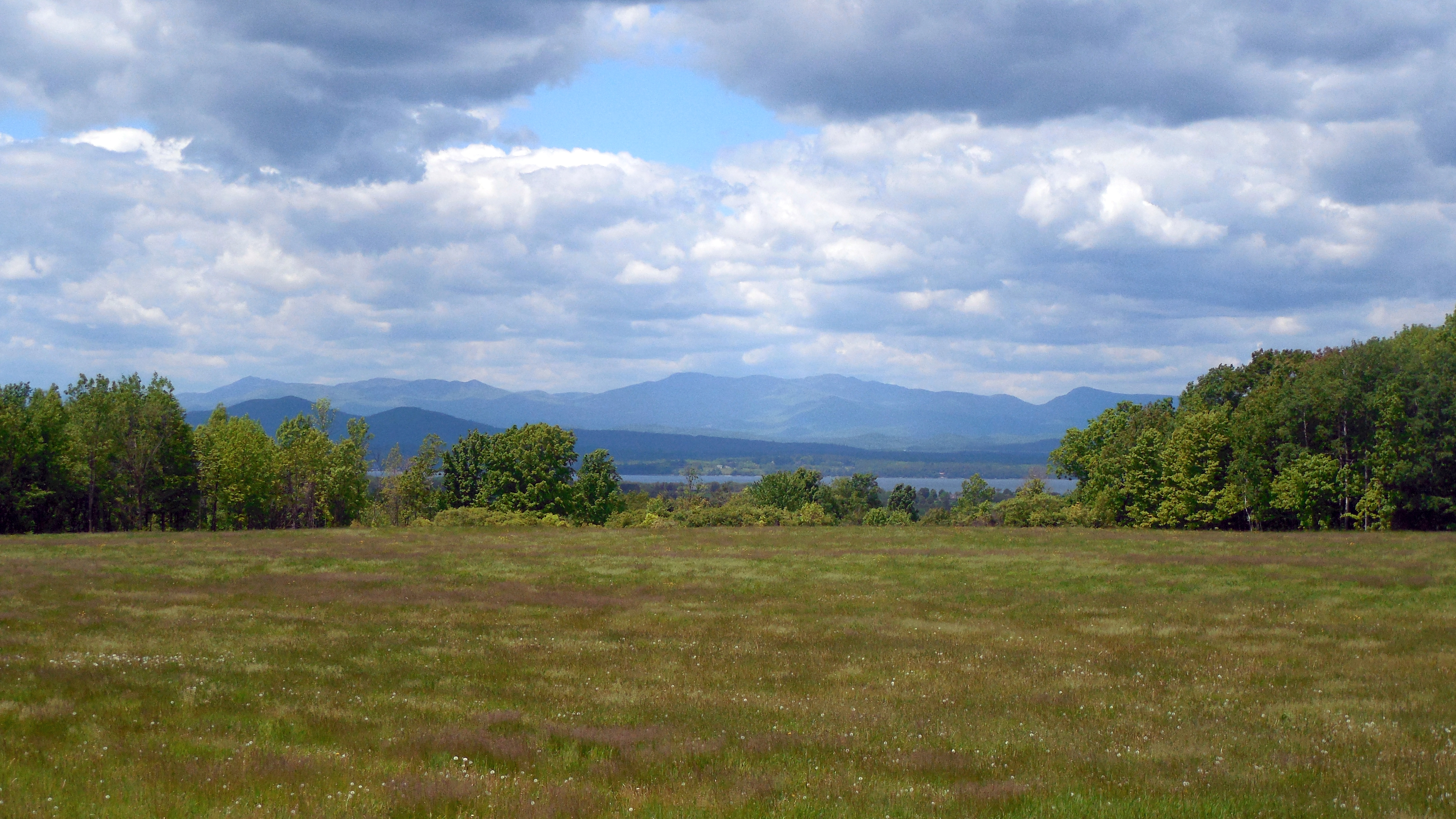
Westward view of the Adirondack Mountains and Lake Champlain from Charlotte's Route 7 Scenic Overlay district.

Charlotte is located in the southwestern corner of Chittenden County. It is bordered to the north by the town of Shelburne, to the east by Hinesburg, to the southeast by Monkton in Addison County, and to the south by Ferrisburgh in Addison County. To the west the town extends to the New York/Vermont border in the middle of Lake Champlain. According to the United States Census Bureau, the town has a total area of 50.3 square miles (130.4 km^{2}), of which 41.3 square miles (106.9 km^{2}) is land and 9.1 square miles (23.6 km^{2}), or 18.08%, is water. The village of East Charlotte is in the eastern part of the town, while West Charlotte colloquially known as "the West Village" (or the Four Corners Historic District), is located on the west side of U.S. Route 7 in the western part of town.

Charlotte is home to 990-foot-high (300 m) Mount Philo. The park was established in 1924 and is open seasonally.

== Demographics ==
Historical population
Census	Pop.	Note	%±
1790	635		—
1800	1,231		93.9%
1810	1,679		36.4%
1820	1,526		−9.1%
1830	1,702		11.5%
1840	1,620		−4.8%
1850	1,634		0.9%
1860	1,589		−2.8%
1870	1,430		−10.0%
1880	1,342		−6.2%
1890	1,240		−7.6%
1900	1,254		1.1%
1910	1,163		−7.3%
1920	1,160		−0.3%
1930	1,089		−6.1%
1940	1,082		−0.6%
1950	1,215		12.3%
1960	1,271		4.6%
1970	1,802		41.8%
1980	2,561		42.1%
1990	3,148		22.9%
2000	3,569		13.4%
2010	3,754		5.2%
2020	3,912		4.2%
U.S. Decennial Census

As of the census of 2000, there were 3,569 people, 1,287 households, and 990 families residing in the town. The population density was 86.0 people per square mile (33.2/km^{2}). There were 1,500 housing units at an average density of 36.2 per square mile (14.0/km^{2}). The racial makeup of the town was 97.93% White, 0.20% African American, 0.06% Native American, 0.59% Asian, 0.45% from other races, and 0.78% from two or more races. Hispanic or Latino of any race were 0.70% of the population.

There were 1,287 households, out of which 42.6% had children under the age of 18 living with them, 66.7% were married couples living together, 6.9% had a female householder with no husband present, and 23.0% were non-families. 15.7% of all households were made up of individuals, and 4.3% had someone living alone who was 65 years of age or older. The average household size was 2.77 and the average family size was 3.12.

In the town, the population was spread out, with 29.7% under the age of 18, 4.4% from 18 to 24, 28.1% from 25 to 44, 30.1% from 45 to 64, and 7.7% who were 65 years of age or older. The median age was 39 years. For every 100 females, there were 97.6 males. For every 100 females age 18 and over, there were 93.7 males.

The median income for a household in the town was $62,313, and the median income for a family was $71,090. Males had a median income of $52,470 versus $35,156 for females. The per capita income for the town was $33,942. About 4.5% of families and 5.0% of the population were below the poverty line, including 7.5% of those under age 18 and 3.6% of those age 65 or over.

== Public transportation ==
=== Major highways ===
- U.S. Route 7 runs north–south through the town.
- Vermont Route F-5 runs east–west from US Route 7 in West Charlotte to the Charlotte-Essex ferry dock.

=== Ferry ===
Hourly ferry service between Essex, New York and Charlotte is provided by the Lake Champlain Transportation Company. Most years in the past decade, the ferry service has run year-round, with the exception of a few days of winter rough or ice-filled lake surface. A commuter bus, operating morning and evening, stops on US Route 7 at Ferry Road for transport to and from Burlington.

=== Transit ===
Since 2022, Amtrak's Ethan Allen Express train has made a stop at Vergennes, 11 miles to the south.

Covered

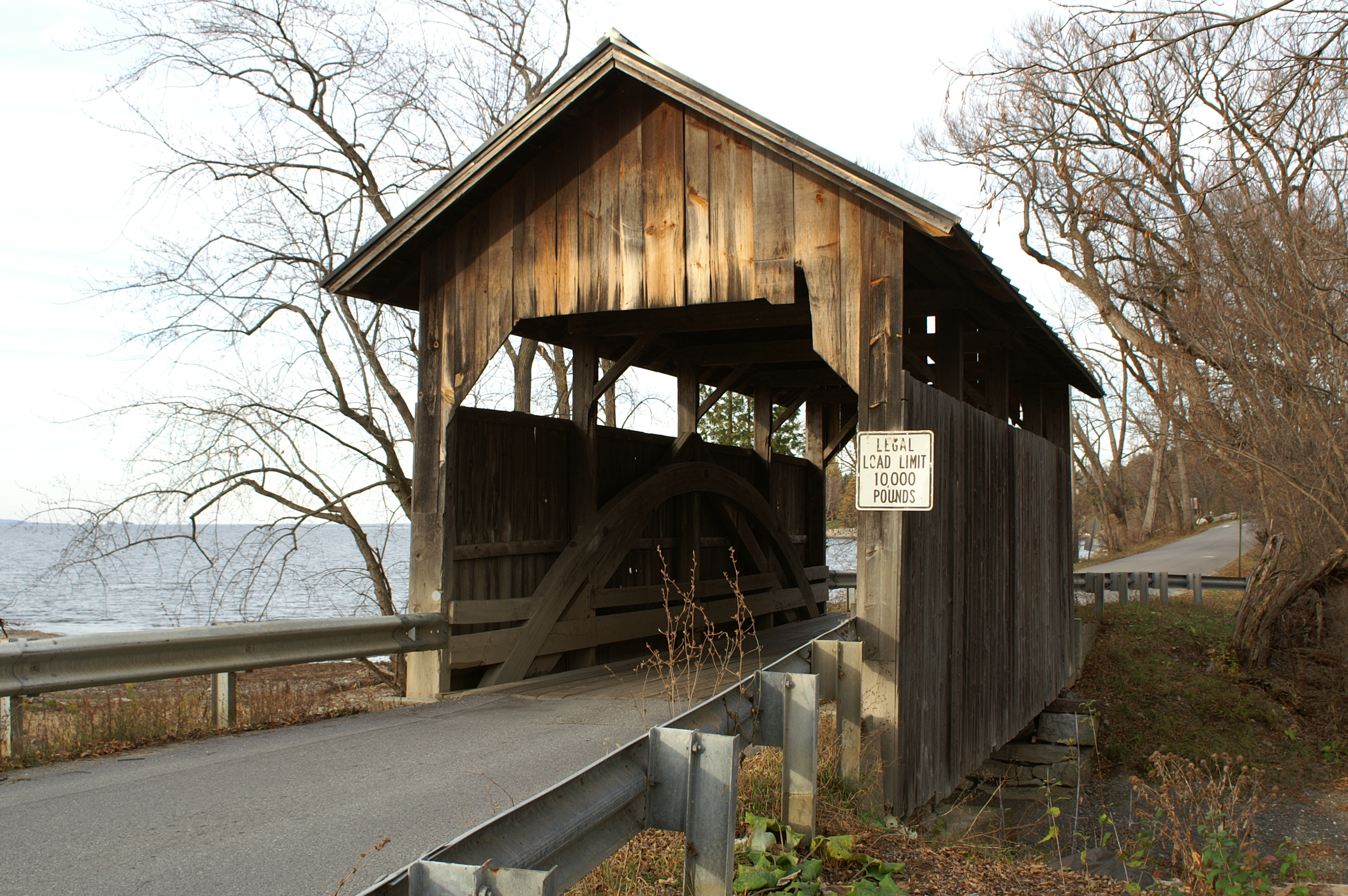
Holmes Creek Covered Bridge on Lake Road

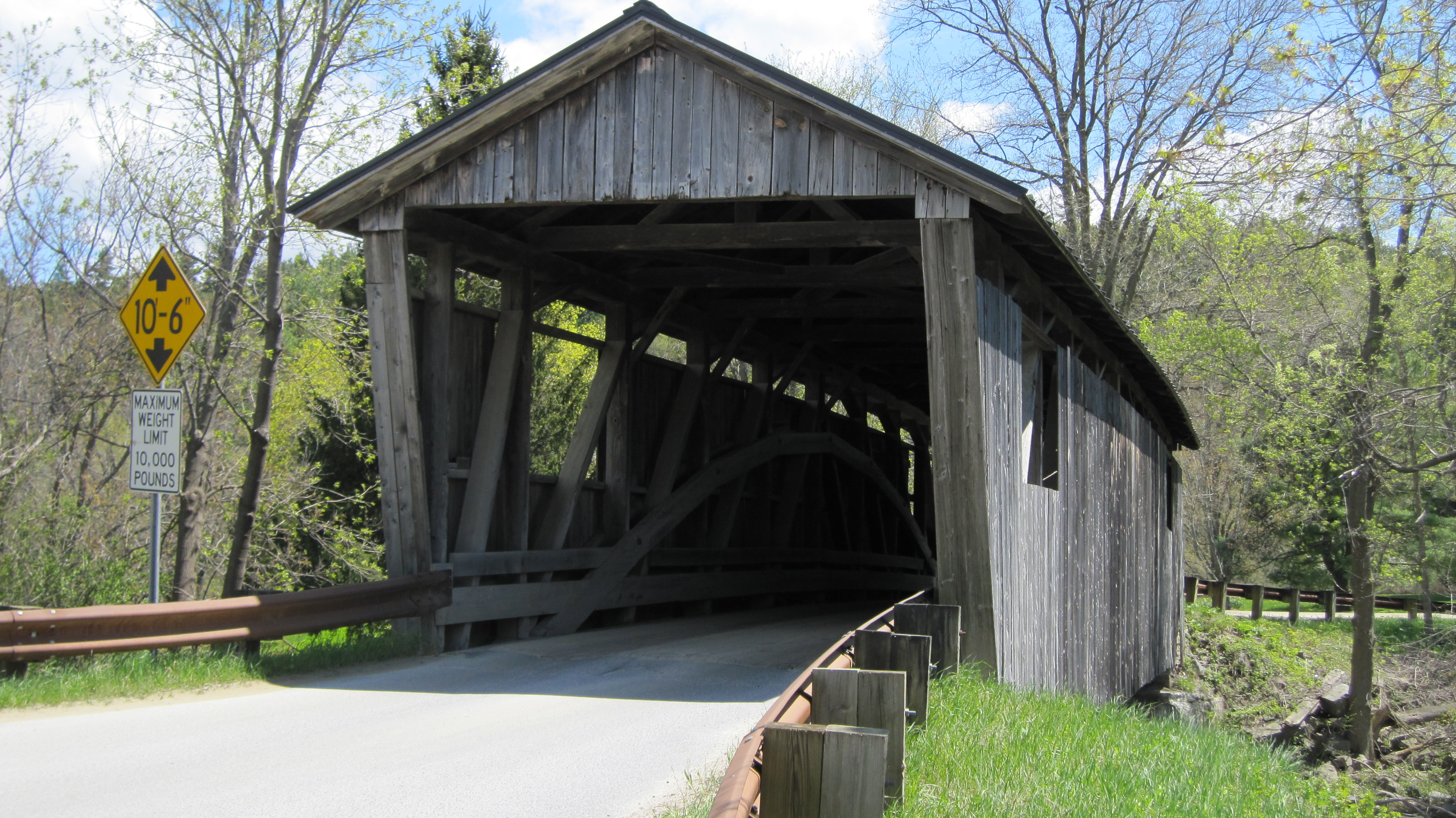
Quinlan's Covered Bridge over the Lewis Creek

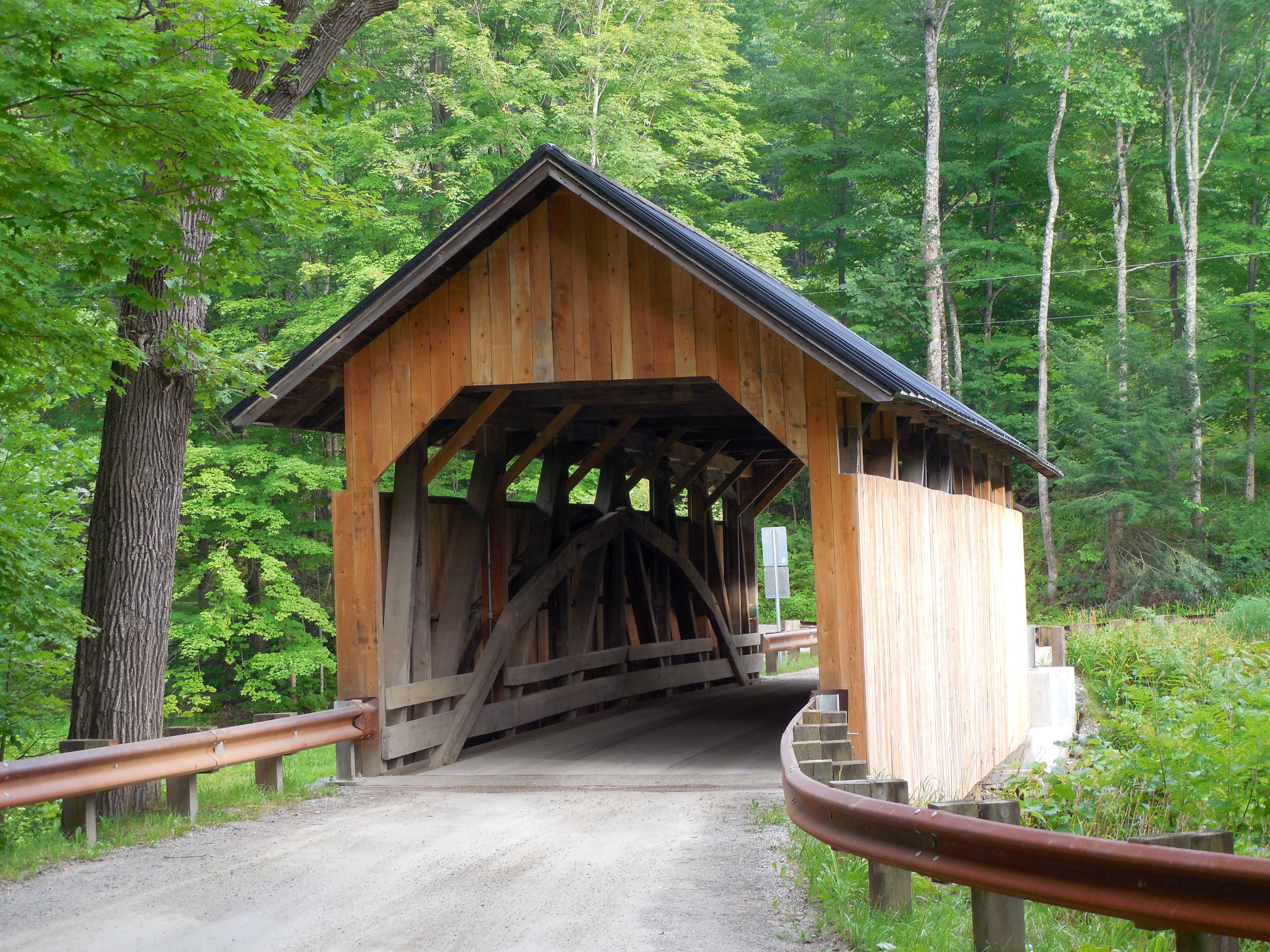
Seguin Covered Bridge on Roscoe Road in East Charlotte.

== Media ==
The Citizen is a weekly newspaper mailed to all residents of Charlotte and nearby Hinesburg. It was established in 2006 as the Charlotte Citizen but changed its name in 2011 when the publication expanded into Hinesburg. In May 2017, The Citizen was acquired by the owners of the Stowe Reporter, who then created the Vermont Community Newspaper Group in 2019.

The Charlotte News is a bi-weekly newspaper delivered every other Thursday to all Charlotte residences. Established in 1958, the Charlotte News is an independent, nonprofit organization. The newspaper is also supported by the Friends of the Charlotte News, a 501(c)(3) nonprofit seeking to support local journalism.

== Gallery ==
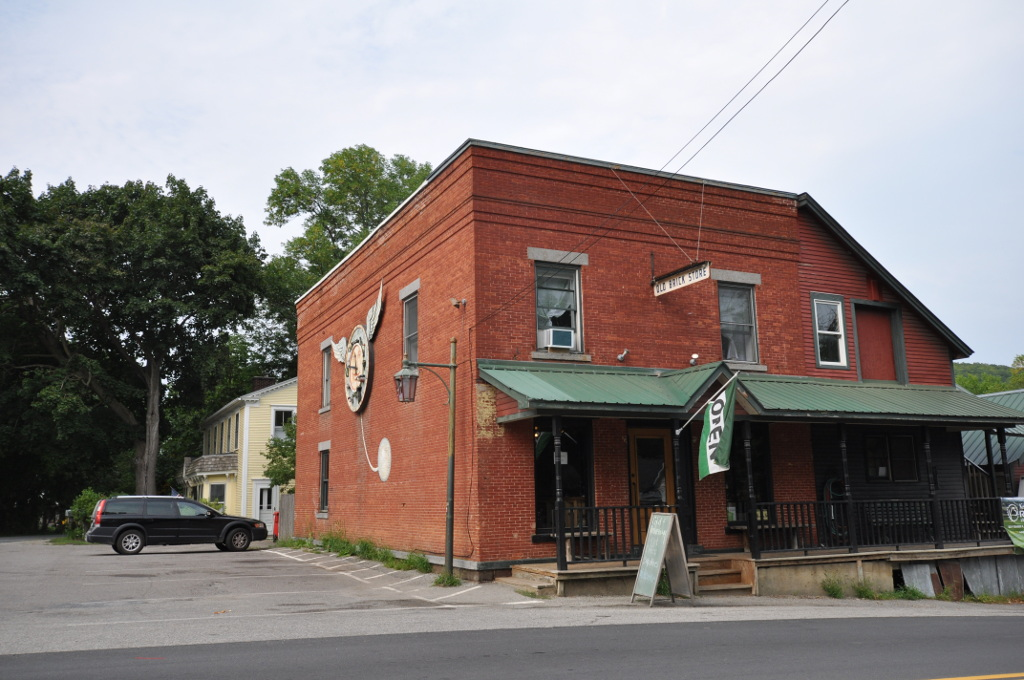
The "Old Brick Store" in the West Village.

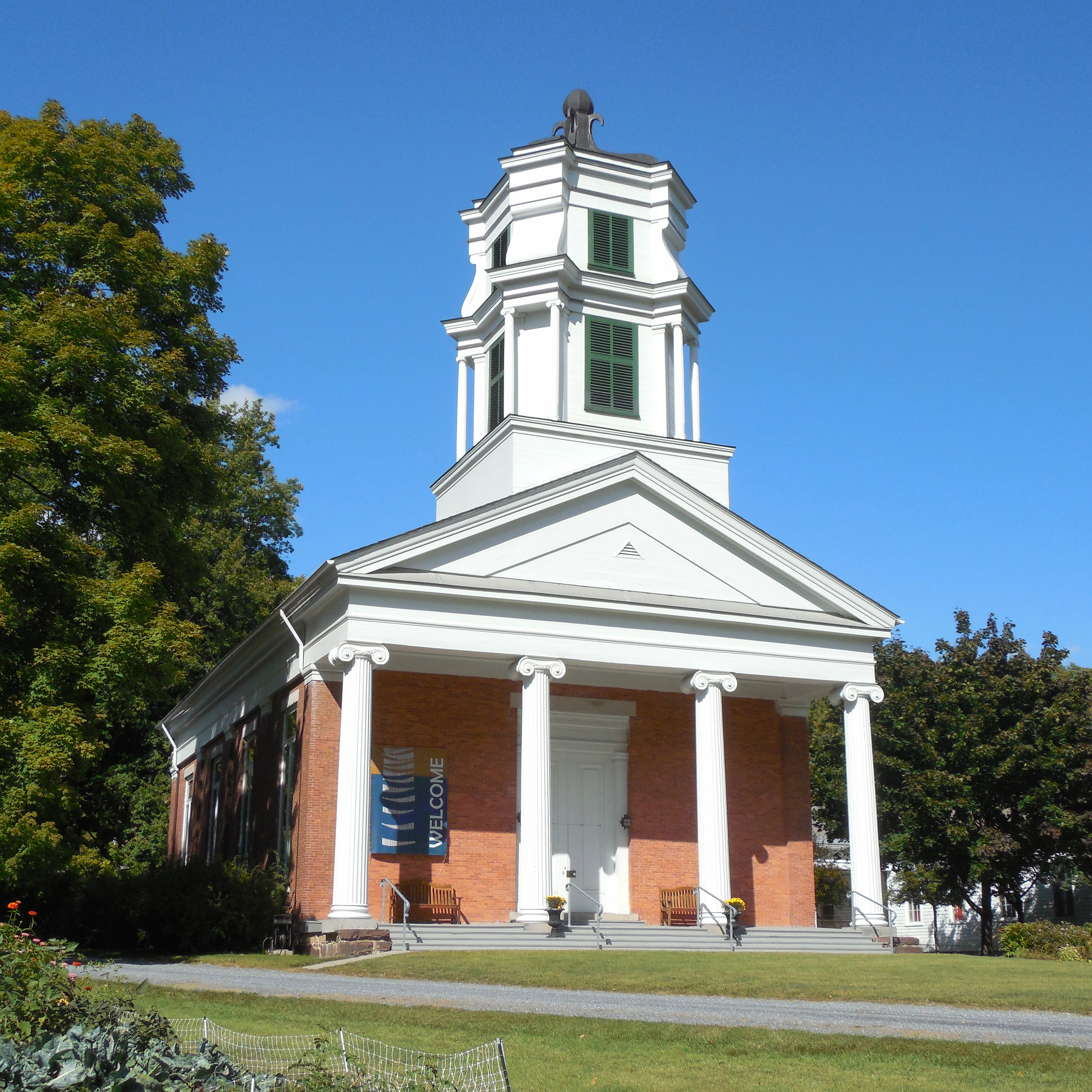
Charlotte Congregational Church in the Charlotte Center Historic District.

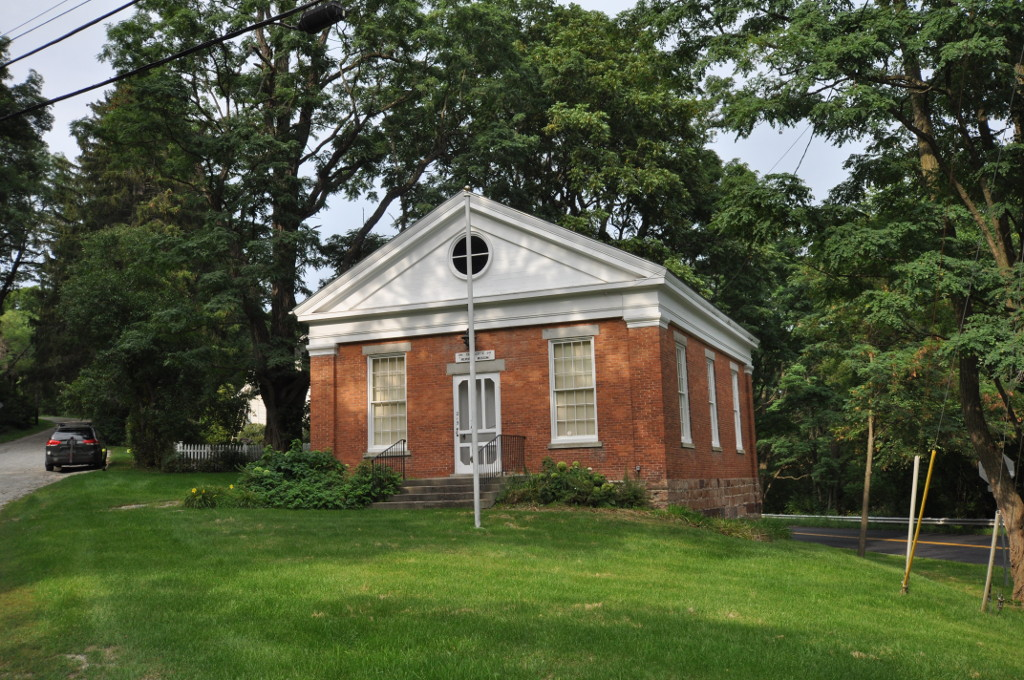
Charlotte Memorial Museum (formerly known as the Town Meeting House), which currently houses the Charlotte Historical Society.

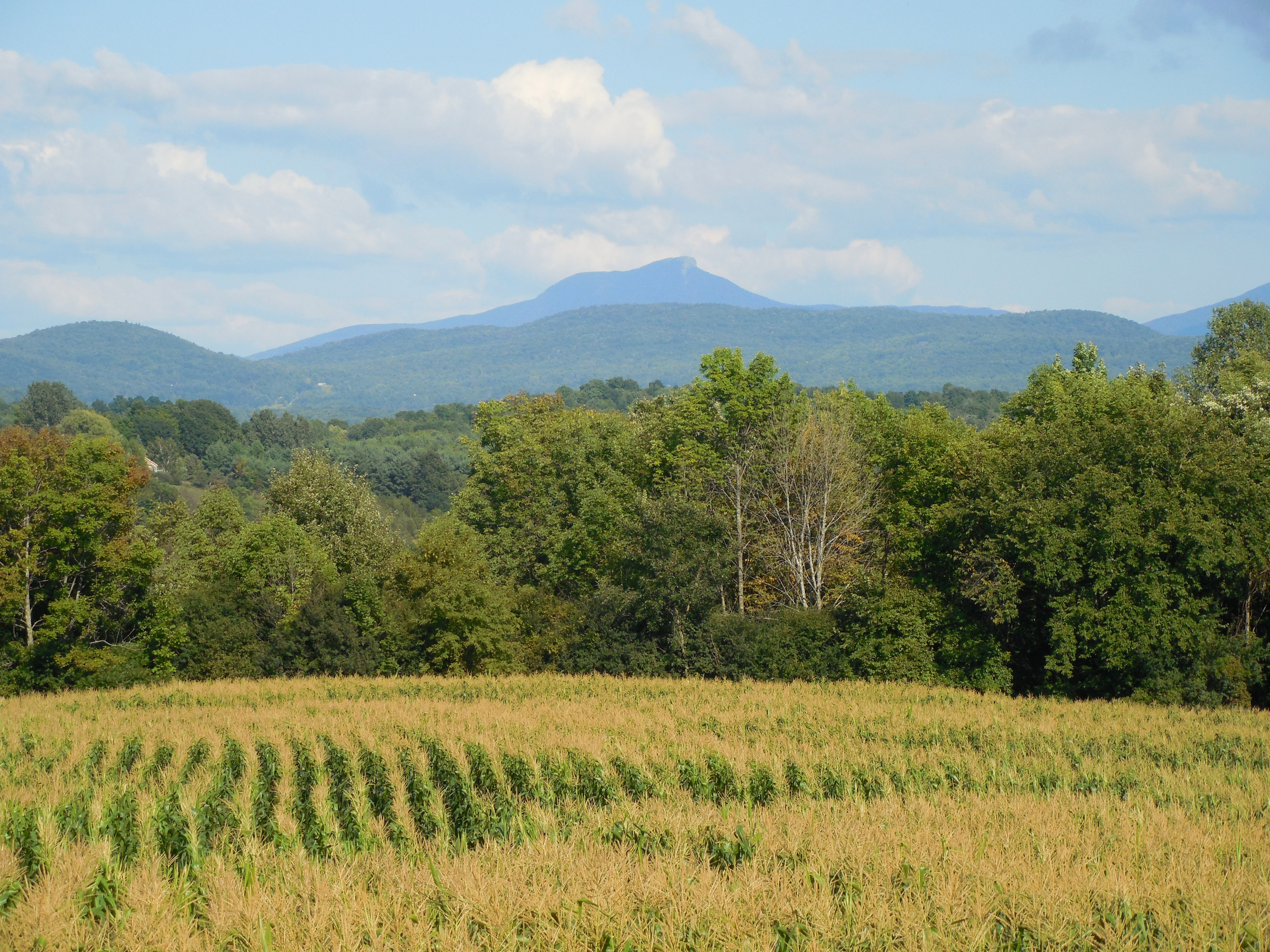
View of Camel's Hump Mountain from East Charlotte.

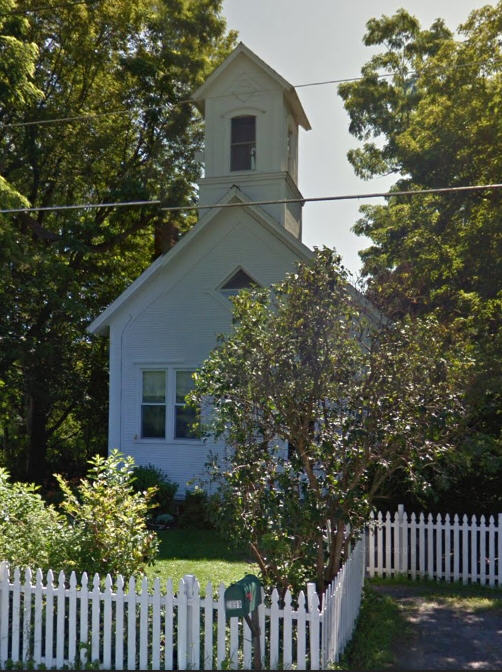
School house on Greenbush Road, originally built in 1881 and formerly known as the Lakeview Seminary where John Dewey served as its first principal.

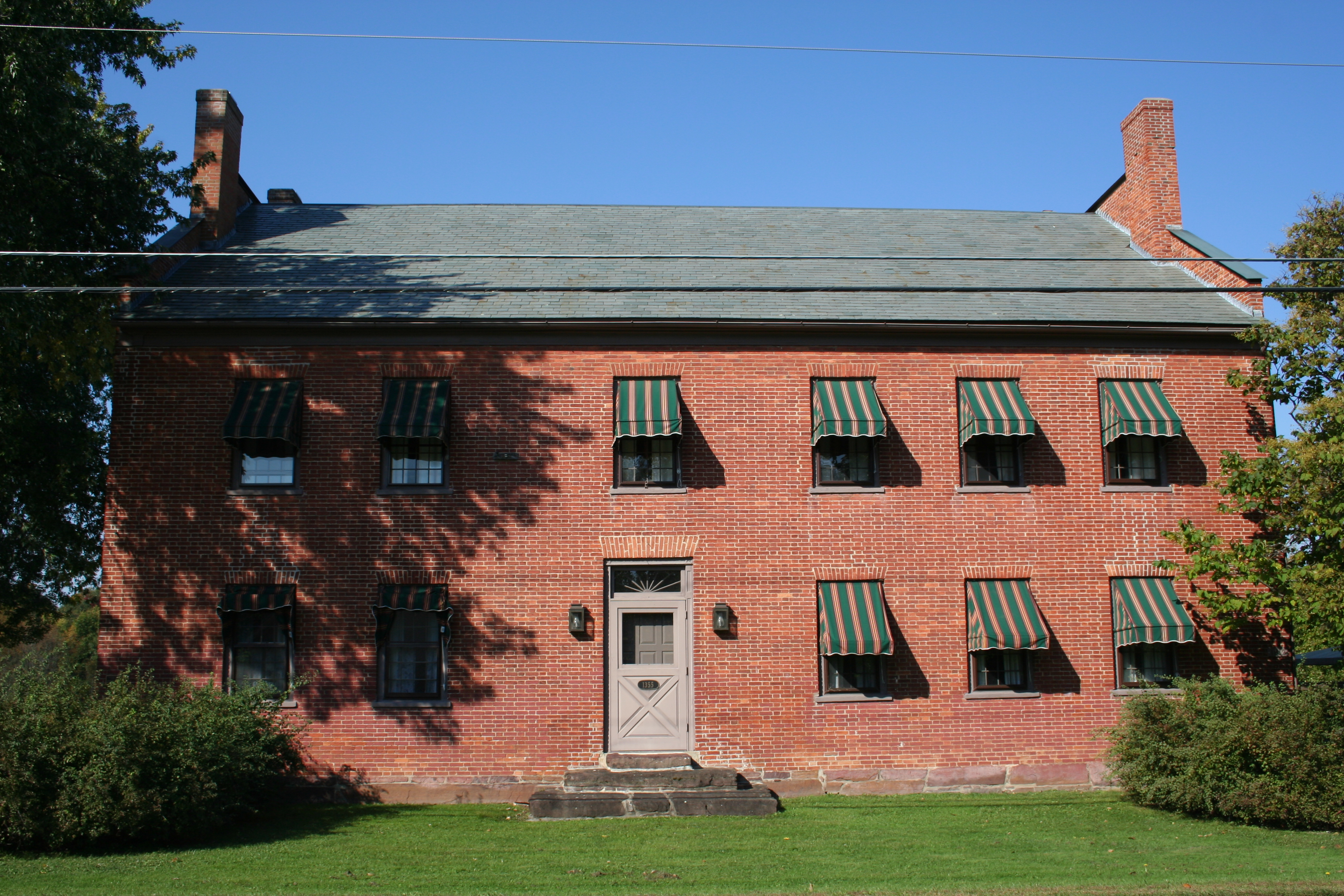
The 1812 Tavern on Church Hill Road.

== Notable people ==
- Jamie Aube, racing driver
- Hezekiah Barnes, major general
- John Dewey, American psychologist and educator
- Wilfred Grenfell, medical humanitarian
- Jeffrey Hollender, American businessperson
- Melvin Kaplan, oboist and concert organizer
- Dan Kiley, landscape architect
- Abel E. Leavenworth, educator and soldier
- Cyrus Pringle, botanist
- John H. Sinclair, commander of the Vermont State Police and United States Marshal for the District of Vermont

== See also ==
- Mount Philo State Park
- Charlotte Center Historic District
- McNeil Homestead
