= West Charlotte, Vermont =

Census-designated place in Vermont, United States

West Charlotte, Vermont Charlotte
- Census-designated place
- Location within Vermont Location within the United States
- Coordinates: 44°18′35″N 73°15′08″W
- Country: United States
- State: Vermont
- County: Chittenden
- Town: Charlotte

Area
  - Total: 0.70 sq mi (1.82 km^{2})
  - Land: 0.70 sq mi (1.81 km^{2})
  - Water: 0.0039 sq mi (0.01 km^{2})
- Elevation: 243 ft (74 m)
- Time zone: UTC-5 (Eastern (EST))
  - Summer (DST): UTC-4 (EDT)
- ZIP Code: 05445 (Charlotte)
- Area code: 802
- FIPS code: 50-79335
- GNIS feature ID: 2807142

West Charlotte (shown as Charlotte on federal topographic maps) is an unincorporated village and census-designated place (CDP) in the town of Charlotte, Chittenden County, Vermont, United States. It was first listed as a CDP prior to the 2020 census. As of the 2020 census, West Charlotte had a population of 169.

== Geography ==
The CDP is in southwestern Chittenden County, in the western part of the town of Charlotte. U.S. Route 7 runs along the east side of the CDP, leading north 12 miles (19 km) to Burlington and south 10 miles (16 km) to Vergennes. Ferry Road passes through the center of the village, leading west to the Charlotte-Essex Ferry, crossing Lake Champlain to Essex, New York.
