= Tavern on Mutton Hill =

Historic house in Vermont, United States

- U.S. National Register of Historic Places
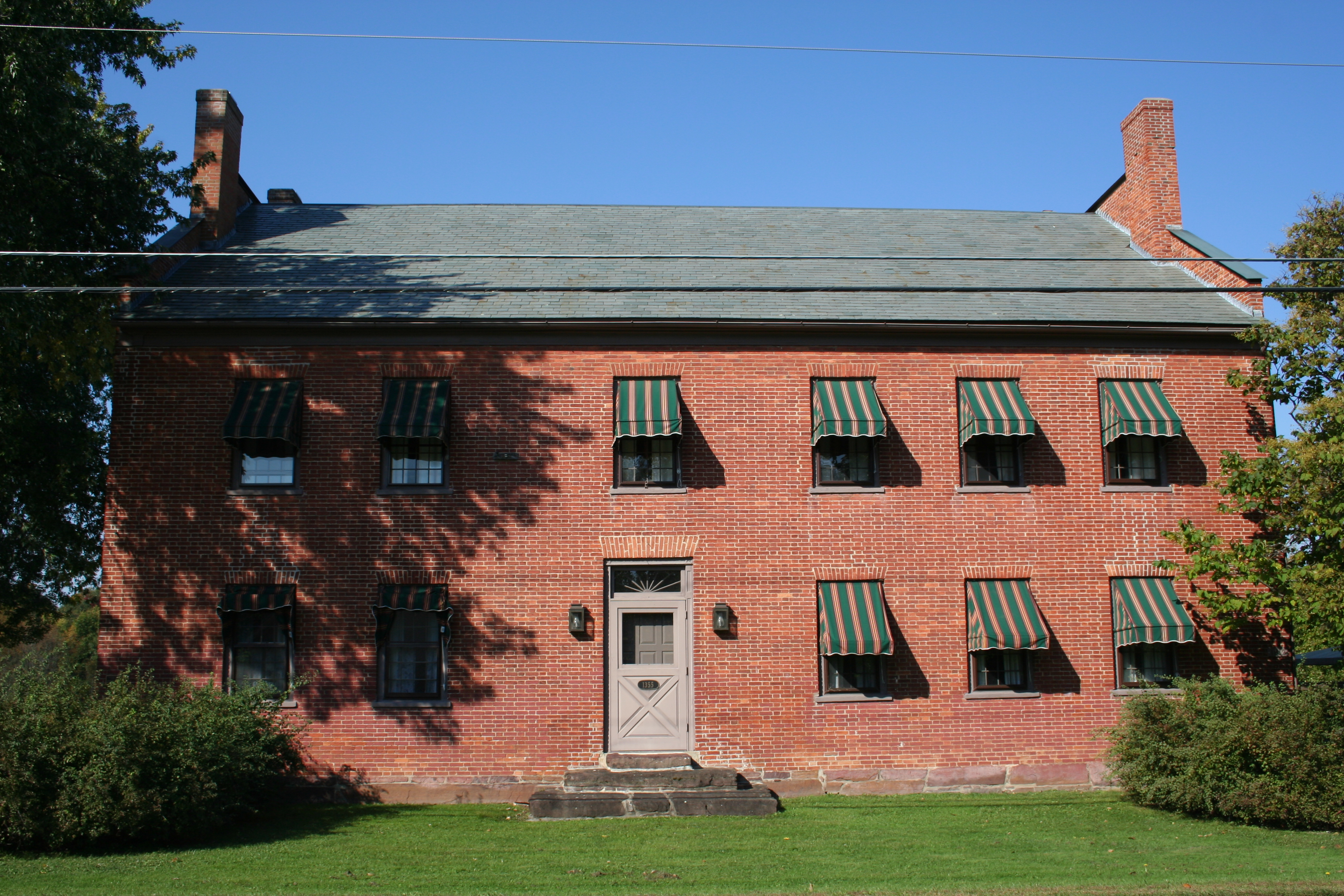

- Location within Vermont Location within the United States
- Location: Church Hill Rd., Charlotte, Vermont
- Coordinates: 44°19′30″N 73°14′15″W
- Area: 4.1 acres (1.7 ha)
- Built: 1813
- Built by: Nathaniel Newell
- Architectural style: Federal
- NRHP reference No.: 82001763
- Added to NRHP: December 10, 1982

The Tavern on Mutton Hill, also known locally (and incorrectly) as the 1812 Tavern, is a historic former public accommodation on Church Hill Road in Charlotte, Vermont. Built in 1813, it is a prominent local example of Federal period architecture, and the town's only documented 19th-century tavern house built out of brick. It was listed on the National Register of Historic Places in 1982.

== Description and history ==
The Tavern on Mutton Hill stands in a cluster of residential buildings in an otherwise rural area of northeastern Charlotte, on the west side of Church Hill Road south of its junction with Mutton Hill Road. It is a 2 1/2-story brick structure, with a redstone foundation and window sills. The gable ends each have two chimneys, joined by a raised parapet. The front facade is six bays wide, with the main entrance set in the bay left of center; it is topped by a rectangular transom with a sunburst pattern. The interior retains period woodwork and finishes, although there have been numerous alterations, including the removal of some walls and the addition of partitions. The former ballroom space on the second floor, extending across the front of the building, has survived with little alteration.

The tavern was built in 1813 by Nathaniel Newell, the son of the local Congregationalist minister Abel Newell, who died the previous year in a typhus epidemic. Newell was the town's wealthiest citizen and a prominent civic leader, serving in the state legislature. In addition to owning this tavern (where he lived with his family), he owned a local tannery, and a dry goods store in Burlington. The tavern is located on what was formerly the principal stagecoach route through Charlotte, and an early alignment of United States Route 7. The tavern was owned by the Edgerton family for more than a century after passing out of the hands of the Newell family.

== See also ==
- National Register of Historic Places listings in Chittenden County, Vermont
