= Wells House =

Wells House may refer to:

== United States ==
(ordered by state then city)

- Wells House (Prescott, Arizona), a property listed on the National Register of Historic Places (NRHP) in Arizona
- John Wells Jr. House, in West Hartford, Connecticut, listed on the NRHP in Connecticut
- Green Gables (Melbourne, Florida) in Melbourne, Florida, also known as the Wells House, listed on NRHP in Florida
- Ida B. Wells-Barnett House, a National Historic Landmark in Chicago, Illinois
- George A. Wells House, in Fairfield, Iowa, listed on the NRHP in Iowa
- Wells House (North Adams, Massachusetts), listed on the NRHP in Massachusetts
- Charles Wells House, in Reading, Massachusetts, listed on the NRHP in Massachusetts
- John M. Wells House, in Southbridge, Massachusetts, listed on the NRHP in Massachusetts
- George B. and Ruth D. Wells House, in Southbridge, Massachusetts, listed on the NRHP in Massachusetts
- H.C. Wells Double House, in Southbridge, Massachusetts, listed on the NRHP in Massachusetts
- Lorenzo Palmer and Ruth Wells House, in Hudson, Michigan, listed on the NRHP in Michigan
- William H. Wells House, in Detroit, Michigan, listed on the NRHP in Michigan
- J. M. Wells House, in Petoskey, Michigan, listed on the NRHP in Michigan
- J. Stuart Wells House, in Binghamton, New York, listed on the NRHP in Broome County
- Joshua Wells House, in Cutchogue, New York, listed on the NRHP in New York
- George A. Wells Jr. House, in Independence, Oregon, listed on the NRHP in Oregon
- William Bittle Wells House, in Portland, Oregon, listed on the NRHP in Oregon
- Reed–Wells House, listed on the NRHP in Portland, Oregon
- Osborne Wells House, in Newberry, South Carolina, listed on the NRHP in South Carolina
- Hannah Wells House, in Park City, Utah, listed on the NRHP in Utah
- Edward Wells House, in Burlington, Vermont, listed on the NRHP in Vermont
- Wells House (Wenatchee, Washington), a property listed on the National Register of Historic Places in Washington
- William Wells House, in Tyler City, West Virginia, listed on the NRHP in West Virginia

== Other ==
- Wells House, Ilkley, West Yorkshire, England
- Wells House, County Wexford, Kilmuckridge, Ireland

== See also ==
- Welles House (disambiguation)
