= Lake Placid (New York) =

- Placid Lake
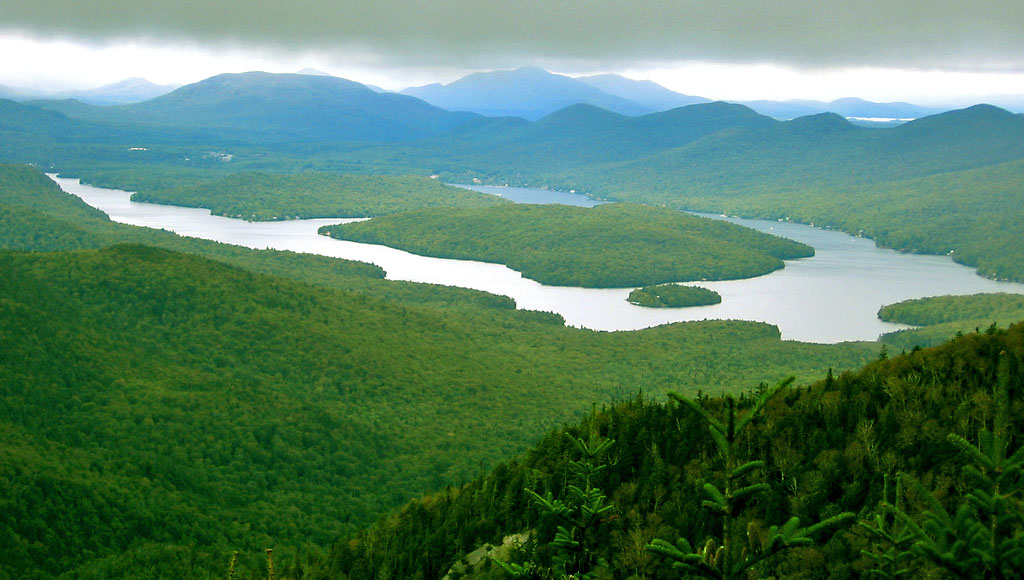
- View from the gondola on Whiteface Mountain

- Location within New York Location within the United States
- Location: Adirondack Mountains, Essex County, New York, US
- Coordinates: 44°19′N 073°58′W
- Type: Glacial lake
- Basin countries: United States
- Surface area: 2,170 acres (8.8 km^{2})
- Average depth: 50 ft (15 m)
- Max. depth: 151 ft (46 m)
- Surface elevation: 1,857 ft (566 m)
- Islands: Buck Island, Moose Island, Hawk Island
- Settlements: Lake Placid

The body of water named Lake Placid is located in the Adirondack Mountains in northern New York, United States. It is located on the northern side of the Village of Lake Placid.

== History ==
The earliest appearance of Lake Placid on a map dates back to 1804. In that map, it is known as Placid Lake. "Placid Lake" is still sometimes used to distinguish it from the village of Lake Placid, New York.

Original settlement of the lake was done by the Peru Steel Ore Company in 1846. They built a wooden dam for the purposes of providing power to ironworking and mining business. The dam proved to be problematic as it affected the water level of the lake. In 1893, residents of the lakeshore organized, becoming the “Shore Owners’ Association,” bought the land surrounding the dam from the Peru Steel Ore Company, and established a regular water level. The dam has since been rebuilt with sturdier materials and is still upkept by the Shore Owners’ Association.

In the late 19th century, construction of camps began along the lake in response to the rise in tourism at the village of Lake Placid. The shores of Placid lake are difficult to get to and often only accessible by boat, making the camps exclusive. There are now about 225 camp sites on the shores and islands of the lake. Historic camp sites have since been preserved and renovated and there is a guided boat tour available for visitors.

== Geography ==
The lake is approximately 2,170 acres (8.8 km^{2}), and has an average depth of about 50 feet (15 m). It is located in the towns of North Elba and St. Armand, both in Essex County.

There are three islands on Lake Placid, named Buck, Moose, and Hawk.

== Conservation ==
The lake borders the northern part of the village of Lake Placid and is a source of drinking water for the town. The lake is fed by springs and Adirondacks mountain streams. There are nearly 300 houses on the lake shore, but since most of the houses are unoccupied much of the year, the water usually remains clean.

Local efforts have been made to combat aquatic invasive species, specifically the variable-leaf milfoil through the Adirondack Watershed Institution's stewardship program. This program provides boat inspections and free boat cleaning stations located in and around boat launching sites of the lake.

The lake has produced record lake trout. The depth of the lake, around 151 at its deepest, and its cold temperatures make it the perfect habitat for lake trout.

== Image gallery ==
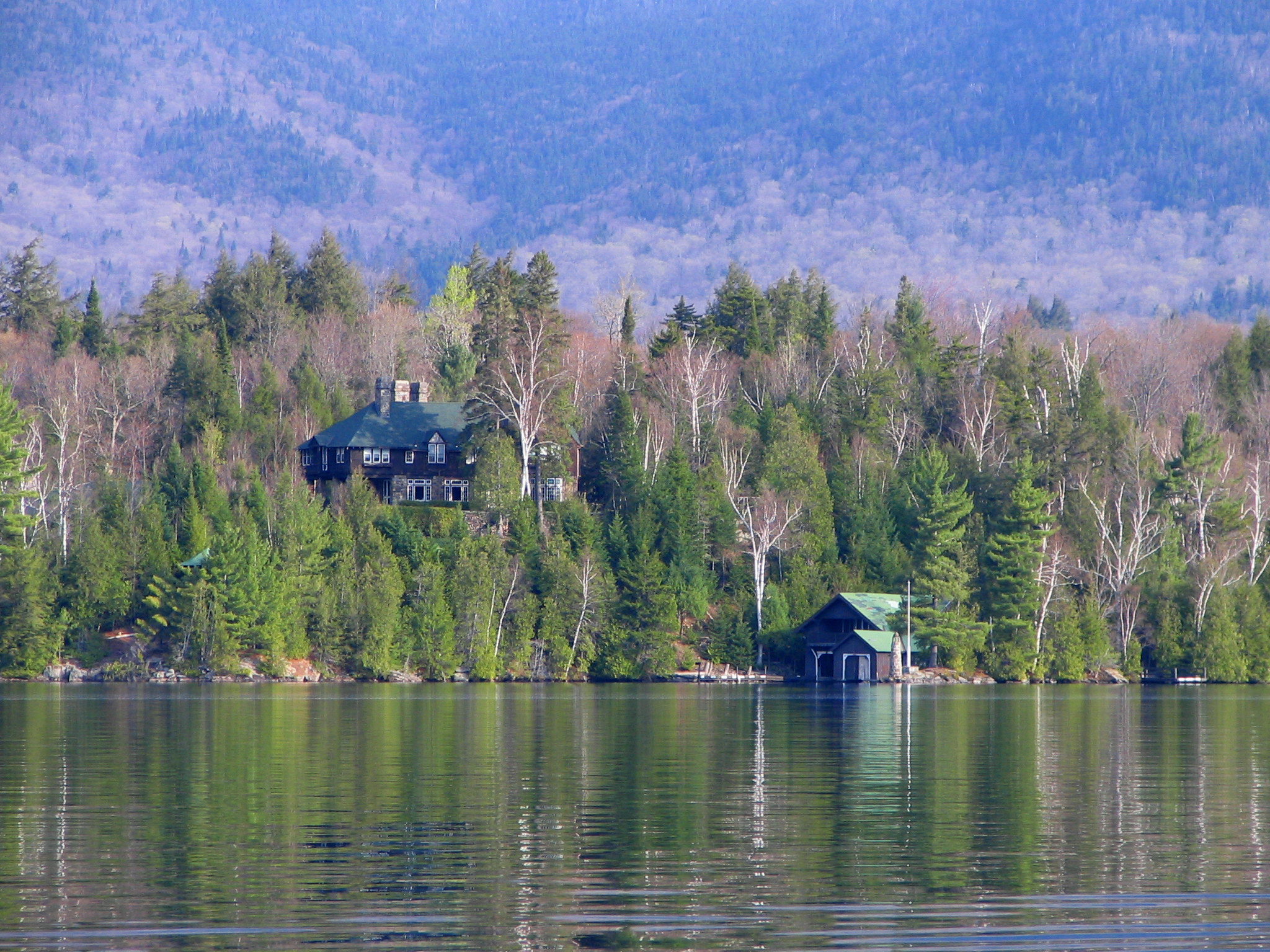
House on Buck Island

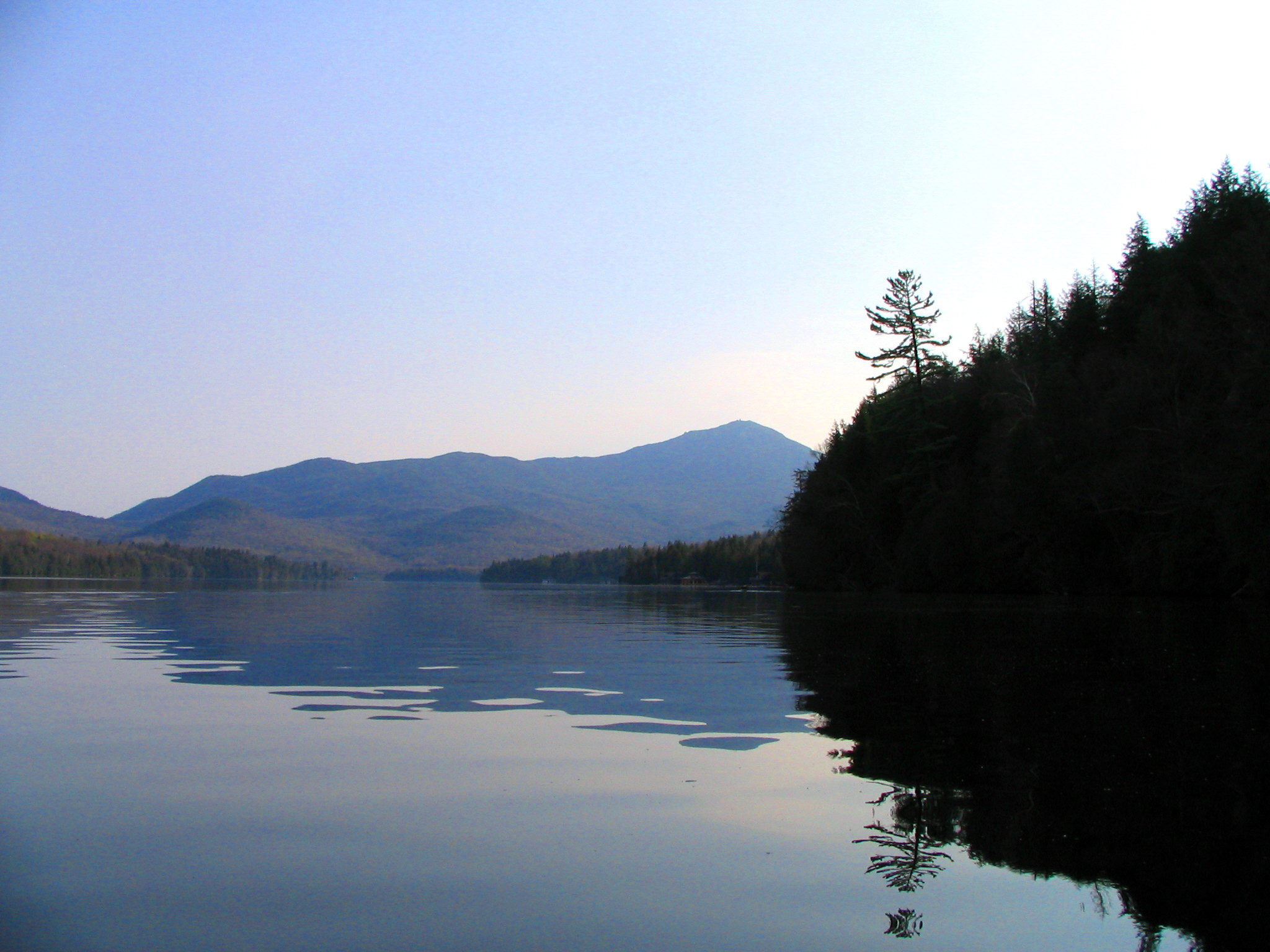
Whiteface Mountain from northern end of lake

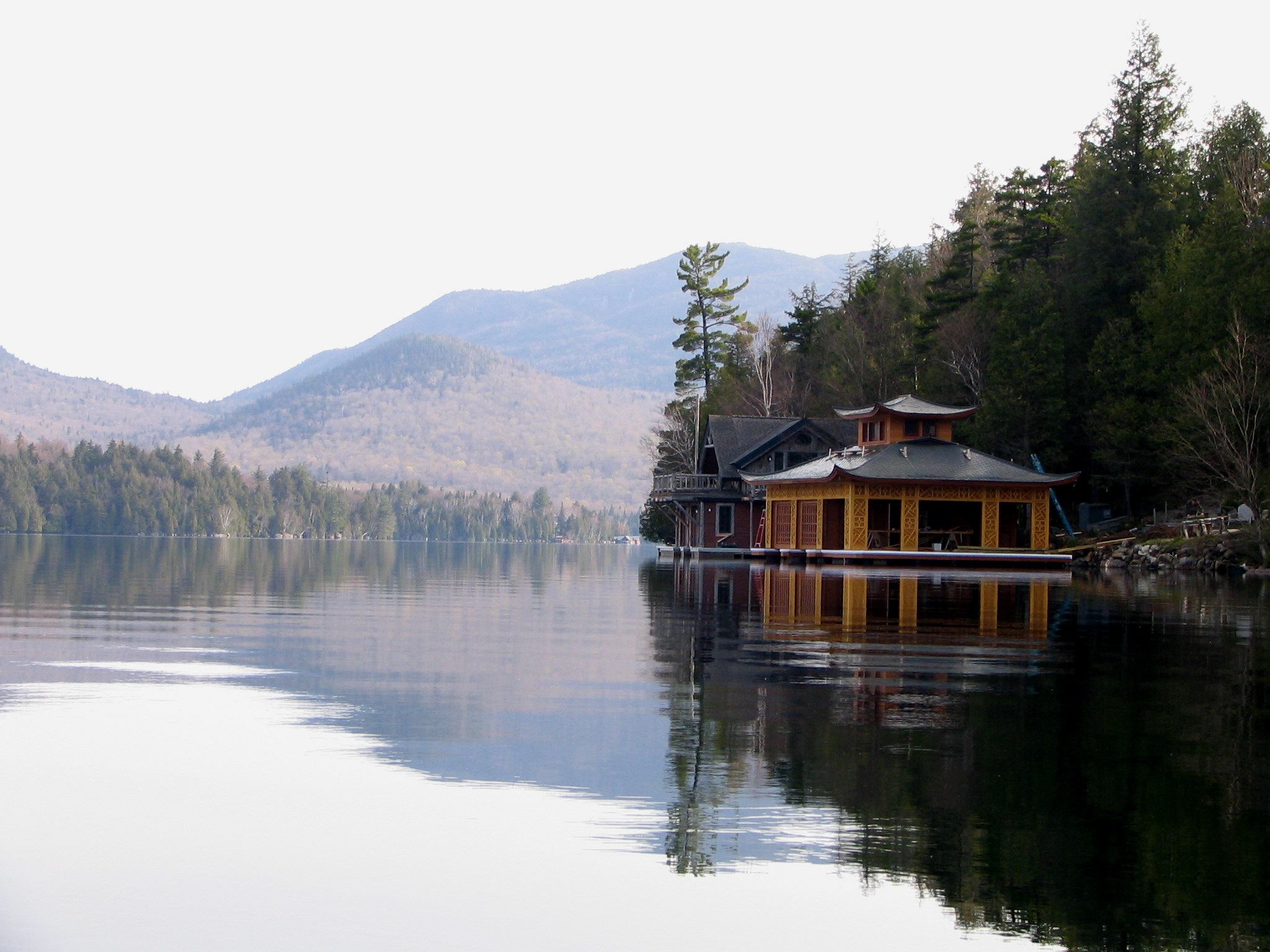
New + old boathouses

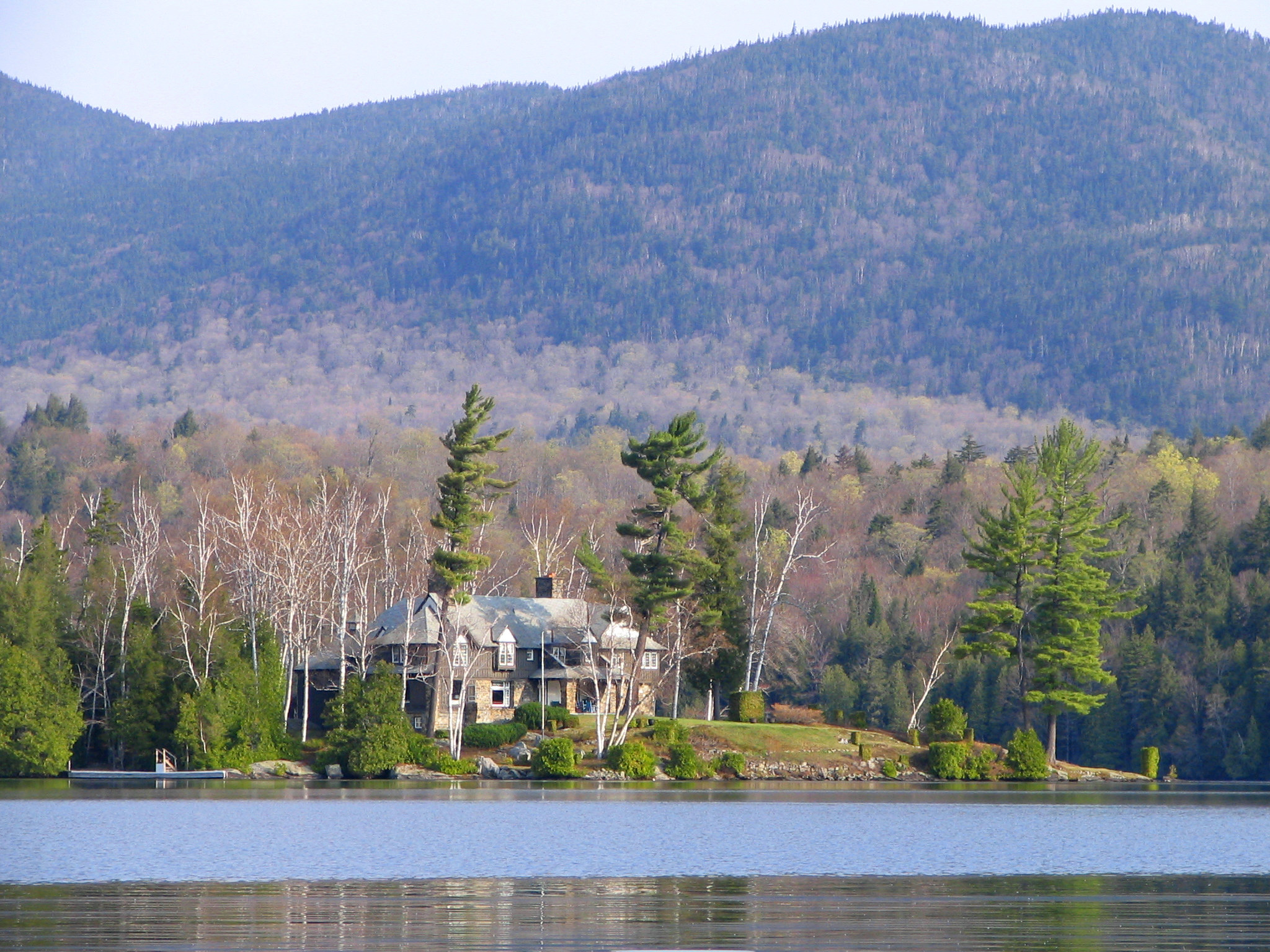
House on Buck Island

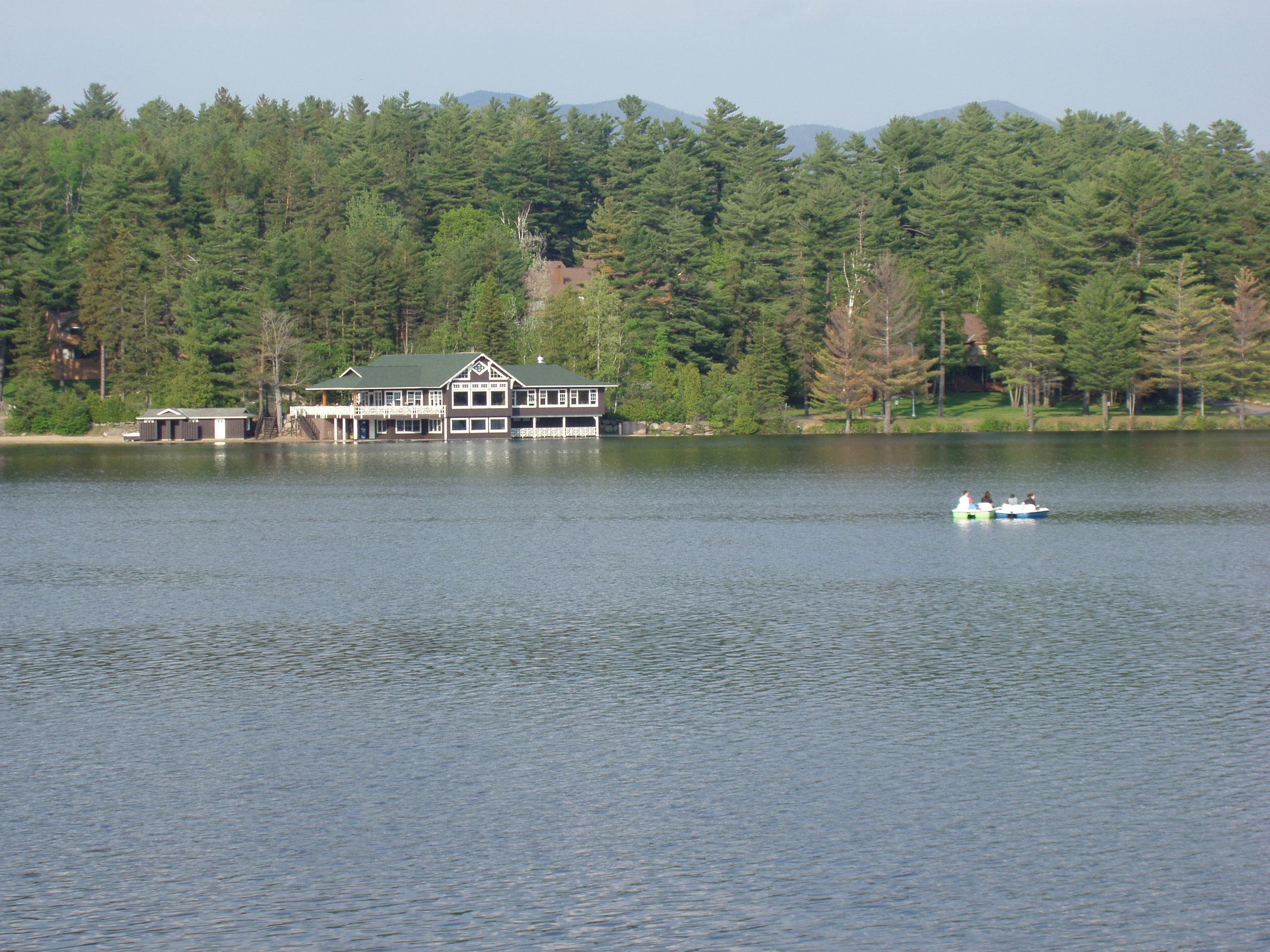
View of the lake

== See also ==
- Adirondack Park
