= List of Delta Upsilon chapters =

Delta Upsilon is a North American collegiate social fraternity. It was established at Williams College in 1834. In the following is a list, active chapters are indicated in bold and inactive chapters are indicated in italic.

Chapter number	Chapter	Charter date and range	Institution	Location	Status	Ref.
1	Williams	November 4, 1834 – 1862; October 12, 1883 – 1964	Williams College	Williamstown, Massachusetts	Inactive	
2	Union	1837–1844, 1846–1863, 1869–1995	Union College	Schenectady, New York	Inactive	
3	Middlebury	May 22, 1845 – 1847; October 3, 1856 – 1990	Middlebury College	Middlebury, Vermont	Inactive	(Note: After going dormant, the chapter reformed from Zeta Phi, established in 1856.)
4	Hamilton	July 21, 1847 – November 2022	Hamilton College	Clinton, New York	Inactive	
5	Amherst	July 29, 1847 – 1861; June 2, 1870 – 1971	Amherst College	Amherst, Massachusetts	Inactive	
6	Wesleyan	October 1850–1852; December 6, 1919 – 1952	Wesleyan University	Middletown, Connecticut	Inactive	(Note: After going dormant, the chapter reformed from Omega Phi, established in 1912.)
7	**Vermont**	1850–1854; April 29, 2018	University of Vermont	Burlington, Vermont	Active	(Note: The Vermont chapter held a three year affiliation with newly-formed Delta Upsilon beginning in 1851, but in 1854 withdrew to form Delta Psi (local). That local chapter was not affiliated with the small national fraternity of Delta Psi. It remained in operation until approximately 2004. Meanwhile, Delta Upsilon recolonized installing its restored Vermont chapter in 2018.)
8	**Western Reserve**	1851–1853, 1866	Case Western Reserve University	Cleveland, Ohio	Active	(Note: Chapter formed from Delta Psi Literary Fraternity, established in 1840. From 1885 to 1906, the chapter was called Adelbert from the name of Men’s College at the university.)
9	**Rochester**	1852–1972; May 4, 1991	University of Rochester	Rochester, New York	Active	(Note: Chapter formed from the O.A. Society, established in 1852.)
10	Colby	July 15, 1852 – 1865; 1879–1984	Colby College	Waterville, Maine	Inactive	(Note: Was originally called the Waterville chapter until Waterville College changed its name to Colby College in 1867.)
11	Bowdoin	October 1859–1861; October 14, 1892 – 1952	Bowdoin College	Brunswick, Maine	Inactive	
12	**Rutgers**	July 6, 1859 – 1991; May 1, 2011	Rutgers University–New Brunswick	New Brunswick, New Jersey	Active	
13	Washington & Jefferson	March 1862–1871	Washington & Jefferson College	Washington, Pennsylvania	Inactive	(Note: Was formed at Jefferson College as the Jefferson chapter, becoming the Washington & Jefferson chapter in 1866 after the two schools merged.)
14	**Colgate**	November 21, 1865	Colgate University	Hamilton, New York	Active	
15	New York	December 19, 1865 – 1945	New York University	New York City, New York	Inactive	(Note: Chapter formed from the Neutral League.)
16	**Miami**	May 13, 1868 – 1873; November 28, 1908	Miami University	Oxford, Ohio	Active	(Note: Chapter became inactive when the college closed in 1873. It reformed in 1908 from Delta Rho (local), established in 1903.)
17	Brown	June 6, 1869 – 1967; February 8, 1987 – 1992	Brown University	Providence, Rhode Island	Inactive	(Note: Chapter formed from Gamma Nu, established in 1860. After going dormant, it was reformed in 1986 from Kappa Delta Upsilon, established in 1967.)
18	**Cornell**	June 6, 1869 – 2001; December 6, 2003	Cornell University	Ithaca, New York	Active	
19	Marietta	December 2, 1870 – 2006	Marietta College	Marietta, Ohio	Inactive	
20	Trinity	June 2, 1870 – 1876	Trinity College	Hartford, Connecticut	Inactive	
21	Princeton	1870–1871	Princeton University	Princeton, New Jersey	Inactive	
22	**Syracuse**	November 14, 1873 – 1971; November 6, 1976 – 1996; June 27, 2018	Syracuse University	Syracuse, New York	Active	(Note: Chapter formed from the Atticaeum Literary Society, established in 1872.)
23	Manhattan	May 14, 1874 – 1878	City University of New York	Manhattan, New York	Inactive	
24	**Michigan**	April 10, 1876 – 1998; April 13, 2003	University of Michigan	Ann Arbor, Michigan	Active	
25	Northwestern	October 27, 1880 – 2013; May 6, 2018 – 2020	Northwestern University	Evanston, Illinois	Inactive	
26	Harvard	February 19, 1881 – 1942; 1999–2005	Harvard University	Cambridge, Massachusetts	Inactive	
27	**Wisconsin**	May 6, 1885	University of Wisconsin–Madison	Madison, Wisconsin	Active	
28	**Lafayette**	May 30, 1885 – 1988; 1994	Lafayette College	Easton, Pennsylvania	Active	
29	Columbia	June 6, 1885 – 1941; 1951–1964	Columbia University	New York City, New York	Inactive	
30	**Lehigh**	October 10, 1885	Lehigh University	Bethlehem, Pennsylvania	Active	
31	**Tufts**	December 4, 1886 – 2019; April 28, 2024	Tufts University	Medford, Massachusetts	Active	(Note: Chapter formed from the Mathetican Society, established in 1886.)
32	**DePauw**	October 28, 1887	DePauw University	Greencastle, Indiana	Active	(Note: Chapter formed from the Barbs, established in 1883.)
33	Pennsylvania	October 26, 1888 – 1972; March 29, 1980 – 1987; April 7, 1900 – April 2016	University of Pennsylvania	Philadelphia, Pennsylvania	Inactive	
34	Minnesota	October 22, 1890 – 1986; 1990–2018	University of Minnesota	Minneapolis, Minnesota	Inactive	(Note: Chapter formed from the Hautbeaux Club, established in 1889.)
35	Technology	November 1891–2014	Massachusetts Institute of Technology	Boston, Massachusetts	Inactive	(Note: Chapter formed from Nu Chi (local), established in February 1891 to become a chapter of Delta Upsilon.)
36	Swarthmore	March 3, 1894 – April 30, 2019	Swarthmore College	Swarthmore, Pennsylvania	Inactive	(Note: Chapter formed from Kappa Beta Sigma, established in 1890.)
37	Stanford	March 13, 1896 – 1987	Stanford University	Palo Alto, California	Inactive	(Note: Chapter formed from Alpha Upsilon, established in 1894.)
38	**California**	March 13, 1896	University of California, Berkeley	Berkeley, California	Active	(Note: Chapter formed from Omega Alpha, established in 1894.)
39	McGill	November 11, 1898 – 1971; March 24, 1984 – 2000	McGill University	Montreal, Quebec	Inactive	(Note: Chapter formed from Omicron Nu, established in 1894.)
40	**Nebraska**	December 9, 1898	University of Nebraska–Lincoln	Lincoln, Nebraska	Active	(Note: Chapter formed from Tau Delta Omicron, established in 1896.)
41	**Toronto**	December 15, 1899	University of Toronto	Toronto, Ontario	Active	(Note: Chapter formed from Phi Alpha, established in 1896.)
42	Chicago	January 5, 1901 – November 2022	University of Chicago	Chicago, Illinois	Inactive	(Note: Chapter formed from the Iron Key, established in 1899.)
43	Ohio State	December 9, 1904 – 2020	Ohio State University	Columbus, Ohio	Inactive	(Note: Chapter formed from Lambda Nu, established in 1898.)
44	**Illinois**	December 21, 1905	University of Illinois at Urbana–Champaign	Urbana, Illinois	Active	(Note: Chapter formed from Kappa Kappa, established in 1902.)
45	**Washington**	December 9, 1910 – June 2018	University of Washington	Seattle, Washington	Colony	(Note: Chapter formed from Gamma Delta, established in 1907. After going dormant, the chapter reformed as a colony in the fall of 2023.)
46	**Pennsylvania State**	December 8, 1911 – 2017; 2018	Pennsylvania State University	State College, Pennsylvania	Active	(Note: Chapter formed from Phi Tau, established in 1905.)
47	**Iowa State**	December 6, 1913 – 2009; September 21, 2013	Iowa State University	Ames, Iowa	Active	(Note: Chapter formed from the Colonnades, established in 1904.)
48	**Purdue**	December 6, 1914 – 2021; March 26, 2023	Purdue University	West Lafayette, Indiana	Active	(Note: Chapter formed from the Cleofan Club, established in 1904.)
49	Indiana	December 11, 1915 – Fall 2023	Indiana University	Bloomington, Indiana	Inactive	(Note: Chapter formed from The Wranglers, established in 1902.)
50	**Carnegie**	December 15, 1917 – 2008; April 13, 2014 – April 2016; Fall 2025	Carnegie Mellon University	Pittsburgh, Pennsylvania	Active	(Note: Chapter formed from Sigma Tau, established in 1906. Chapter closed in 2017, reopened under expansion in Fall 2025)
51	**Kansas**	January 10, 1920 – 2019; December 9, 2023	University of Kansas	Lawrence, Kansas	Active	(Note: Chapter formed from Kanza Society, established in 1912.)
52	**Oregon State**	January 14, 1922 – 2022	Oregon State University	Corvallis, Oregon	Colony	(Note: Chapter formed from Gamma Tau Beta, established in 1913. After going dormant, it reformed as a colony in spring 2023.)
53	**Virginia**	April 8, 1922 – 1943; April 30, 1949	University of Virginia	Charlottesville, Virginia	Active	(Note: Chapter formed from Delta Alpha, established in 1920.)
54	**Missouri**	December 6, 1924 – November 2016; November 2, 2019	University of Missouri	Columbia, Missouri	Active	(Note: Chapter formed from the Dana Press Club, established in 1909. Later, it absorbed Delta Kappa.)
55	Iowa	December 5, 1925 – 2008; April 11, 2015 – Fall 2023	University of Iowa	Iowa City, Iowa	Inactive	(Note: Chapter formed from Kappa Beta Psi, established in 1920.)
56	Dartmouth	December 4, 1926 – 1966	Dartmouth College	Hanover, New Hampshire	Inactive	(Note: Chapter formed from Epsilon Kappa Phi, established in 1920.)
57	**Oklahoma**	January 15, 1928	University of Oklahoma	Norman, Oklahoma	Active	(Note: Chapter formed from Delta Pi, established in 1921.)
58	Johns Hopkins	December 8, 1928 – 1999	Johns Hopkins University	Baltimore, Maryland	Inactive	(Note: Chapter formed from Pi Kappa Chi, established in 1905.)
59	California-Los Angeles	January 12, 1929 – 1952	University of California, Los Angeles	Los Angeles, California	Inactive	(Note: Chapter formed from Delta Mu Phi, established in 1920.)
60	Manitoba	November 23, 1929 – February 2017	University of Manitoba	Winnipeg, Manitoba	Inactive	(Note: Chapter formed from Phi Epsilon, established in 1926.)
61	Washington and Lee	December 6, 1930 – 1969	Washington and Lee University	Lexington, Virginia	Inactive	(Note: Chapter formed from the Arcades Club, established in 1920.)
62	**Western Ontario**	December 6, 1931	University of Western Ontario	London, Ontario, Canada	Active	(Note: Chapter formed from Sigma Kappa Sigma, established in 1926.)
63	**Washington State**	March 4, 1933 – 2000; 2001–November 2016	Washington State University	Pullman, Washington	Colony	(Note: Chapter formed from Psi Nu Sigma, established in 1919. After going dormant, the chapter reformed as a colony on November 13, 2021.)
64	Oregon	January 6, 1934 – 1971; February 13, 1988 – 2010; October 24, 2015 – August 2022	University of Oregon	Eugene, Oregon	Inactive	(Note: Chapter formed from Sigma Pi Tau, established in 1923.)
65	British Columbia	January 16, 1935 – 1968	University of British Columbia	Vancouver, British Columbia	Inactive	(Note: Chapter formed from Chi Omega Psi, established in 1928.)
66	**Alberta**	January 19, 1935	University of Alberta	Edmonton, Alberta, Canada	Active	(Note: Chapter formed from Pi Epsilon, established in 1923.)
67	**San Jose**	November 14, 1948 – 1969; December 1, 1984	San Jose State University	San Jose, California	Active	(Note: Chapter formed from Alpha Pi Omega, established in 1931.)
68	Kent State	December 4, 1948 – 1971; April 28, 1990 – 2023	Kent State University	Kent, Ohio	Inactive	(Note: Chapter formed from Kappa Mu Kappa, established in 1921.)
69	**Louisville**	January 8, 1949	University of Louisville	Louisville, Kentucky	Active	(Note: Chapter formed from Sigma Chi Sigma, established in 1921.)
70	Michigan State	January 15, 1949 – 1972; November 17, 1979 – 2007	Michigan State University	East Lansing, Michigan	Inactive	(Note: Chapter formed from Delta Rho, established in 1946.)
71	**Texas**	October 29, 1949 – 2000; November 12, 2017	University of Texas at Austin	Austin, Texas	Active	(Note: Chapter formed from 1834 Club, established in 1947.)
72	Bowling Green	November 19, 1949 – 2006	Bowling Green State University	Bowling Green, Ohio	Inactive	(Note: Chapter formed from Pi Theta Bowling, established in 1947.)
73	Denison	December 3, 1949 – 1984; 1993–2004	Denison University	Granville, Ohio	Inactive	(Note: Chapter formed from the 1834 Club, established in 1949.)
74	Bucknell	November 18, 1950 – 2003; April 22, 2007 – 2015; September 26, 2020 – December 2021	Bucknell University	Lewisburg, Pennsylvania	Inactive	(Note: Chapter formed from Delta Sigma, established in 1899.)
75	**Bradley**	December 8, 1951	Bradley University	Peoria, Illinois	Active	(Note: Chapter formed from Rho Delta, established in 1946.)
76	Colorado	February 28, 1953 – 1997	University of Colorado Boulder	Boulder, Colorado	Inactive	(Note: Chapter formed from the 1834 Club, established in 1851. After going inactive, it reformed a colony on November 15, 2019, but closed in 2024 before being rechartered.)
77	**North Carolina**	April 25, 1953 – 2001; 2005	University of North Carolina at Chapel Hill	Chapel Hill, North Carolina	Active	(Note: Chapter formed from the Delta Club, established in 1949.)
78	Ohio	December 3, 1955 – 1996; 2000–2020	Ohio University	Athens, Ohio	Inactive	(Note: Chapter formed from Chi Delta Tau, established in 1952.)
79	Western Michigan	March 24, 1956 – 1976; December 1, 1990 – 1997	Western Michigan University	Kalamazoo, Michigan	Inactive	(Note: Chapter formed from Zeta Delta Epsilon, established in 1941.)
80	**Kansas State**	November 17, 1956	Kansas State University	Manhattan, Kansas	Active	(Note: Chapter formed from 1834 Club, established in 1955.)
81	**Georgia Tech**	October 26, 1957	Georgia Tech	Atlanta, Georgia	Active	(Note: Chapter formed from the 1834 Club, established in 1956.)
82	**Florida**	December 7, 1958 – 1993; 1999	University of Florida	Gainesville, Florida	Active	
83	Pacific	January 17, 1959 – 1972; November 15, 2005 – April 2011	University of the Pacific	Stockton, California	Inactive	(Note: Chapter formed from Omega Phi Alpha, established in 1922. It withdrew in 1972 and again became Omega Phi Alpha (local). In 2005, it again became a chapter of Delta Upsilon.)
84	Ripon	April 11, 1959 – 1984	Ripon College	Ripon, Wisconsin	Inactive	(Note: Chapter formed from Lambda Delta Alpha, established in 1922.)
85	**Wichita**	April 25, 1959	Wichita State University	Wichita, Kansas	Active	(Note: Chapter formed from the Men of Webster Society, established in 1895.)
86	Arizona	May 2, 1959 – 1970	University of Arizona	Tucson, Arizona	Inactive	(Note: Chapter formed from 1834 Club, established in 1958.)
87	Oklahoma State	April 24, 1960 – 1990	Oklahoma State University	Stillwater, Oklahoma	Inactive	(Note: Chapter formed from 1834 Club, established in 1959.)
88	**Clarkson**	March 18, 1961 – 2008; April 18, 2015	Clarkson University	Potsdam, New York	Active	(Note: Chapter formed from Lambda Iota, established in 1919.)
89	Auburn	November 25, 1961 – 1970	Auburn University	Auburn, Alabama	Inactive	(Note: Chapter formed from Alpha Delta Upsilon, established in 1960.)
90	**North Dakota**	December 9, 1961	University of North Dakota	Grand Forks, North Dakota	Active	(Note: Chapter formed from 1834 Club, established in 1960.)
91	Simpson	May 30, 1964 – 1976	Simpson College	Indianola, Iowa	Inactive	(Note: Chapter formed from Kappa Theta Psi, established in 1902.)
92	San Fernando	October 10, 1964 – 1969	California State University, Northridge	Northridge, California	Inactive	(Note: Chapter formed from Delta Sigma Nu, established in 1958.)
93	Northern Illinois	May 7, 1966 – 2000; May 15, 2010 – 2019	Northern Illinois University	DeKalb, Illinois	Inactive	(Note: Chapter formed from Alpha Chi Epsilon, established in 1963.)
94	Davis	May 14, 1966 – 1970	University of California, Davis	Davis, California	Inactive	(Note: Chapter formed from Alpha Delta Upsilon, established in 1964.)
95	Fresno	May 4, 1968 – 2010	California State University, Fresno	Fresno, California	Inactive	(Note: Chapter formed from Alpha Delta Upsilon, established in 1967.)
96	**San Diego**	May 11, 1968 – 1994; November 4, 2000	San Diego State University	San Diego, California	Active	(Note: Chapter formed from Alpha Delta Upsilon, established in 1966.)
97	Northern Iowa	May 18, 1968 – 2008	University of Northern Iowa	Cedar Falls, Iowa	Inactive	(Note: Chapter formed from Psi Omega, established in 1964.)
98	Creighton	April 12, 1969 – 1996	Creighton University	Omaha, Nebraska	Inactive	(Note: Chapter formed from Kappa Gamma Sigma, established in 1968.)
99	**Arlington**	May 3, 1969	University of Texas at Arlington	Arlington, Texas	Active	(Note: Chapter formed from Sigma Phi Beta, established in 1965.)
100	Platteville	May 11, 1969 – 1975	University of Wisconsin–Platteville	Platteville, Wisconsin	Inactive	(Note: Chapter formed from Phi Sigma Chi, established in 1966.)
101	**Tennessee**	May 17, 1969 – 1996; May 4, 2024	University of Tennessee	Knoxville, Tennessee	Active	
102	**Delaware**	April 11, 1970 – 1983	University of Delaware	Newark, Delaware	Colony	(Note: Chapter formed from Sigma Tau, established in 1968. After going dormant, it was reinstated as an associate chapter on November 12, 2021.)
103	Central Missouri	April 11, 1970 – 1989	Central Missouri State University	Warrensburg, Missouri	Inactive	(Note: Chapter formed from Omicron Chi, established in 1968.)
104	Marquette	April 17, 1970 – 1975	Marquette University	Milwaukee, Wisconsin	Inactive	(Note: Chapter formed from Delta Sigma Chi.)
105	Oshkosh	April 19, 1970 – 1977	University of Wisconsin–Oshkosh	Oshkosh, Wisconsin	Inactive	(Note: Chapter formed from Alpha Delta Upsilon, established in 1969.)
106	**Cal Poly**	May 2, 1970 – 1975; 1992	California Polytechnic State University, San Luis Obispo	San Luis Obispo, California	Active	(Note: Chapter formed from Alpha Upsilon, established in 1955. It withdrew and returned to local status in 1975, reforming as a chapter of Delta Upsilon in 1992.)
107	North Dakota State	May 9, 1970 – April 2022	North Dakota State University	Fargo, North Dakota	Inactive	(Note: Chapter formed from Alpha Delta Upsilon, established in 1968.)
108	Maine	May 16, 1970 – 1993	University of Maine	Orono, Maine	Inactive	
109	East Kentucky	November 13, 1970 – 1983	Eastern Kentucky University	Richmond, Kentucky	Inactive	(Note: Chapter formed from Alpha Chi Lambda, established in 1966.)
110	Colorado State	February 28, 1971 – 1974; April 4, 1981 – 1988	Colorado State University	Fort Collins, Colorado	Inactive	(Note: Chapter formed from Alpha Delta Upsilon, established in 1969.)
111	Dayton	March 12, 1971 – 1982	University of Dayton	Dayton, Ohio	Inactive	(Note: Chapter formed from Delta Delta Tau, established in 1963.)
112	South Dakota	May 1, 1971 – 2001	University of South Dakota	Vermillion, South Dakota	Inactive	
113	Southern Illinois	May 8, 1971 – 1980	Southern Illinois University	Carbondale, Illinois	Inactive	(Note: Chapter formed from Alpha Delta Upsilon, established in 1970.)
114	Tyler	November 21, 1971 – 1989	Tyler Junior College	Tyler, Texas	Inactive	(Note: Chapter formed from Alpha Delta Chi (local), established in 1961.)
115	Maryland	May 13, 1972 – 1992; November 4, 2017 – 2023	University of Maryland, College Park	College Park, Maryland	Inactive	(Note: Chapter formed from Pi Rho, established in 1968.)
116	Southwest Texas	May 20, 1972 – 1978	Texas State University	San Marcos, Texas	Inactive	
117	Houston	April 28, 1973 – 2022	University of Houston	Houston, Texas	Inactive	
118	Wilmington	February 2, 1974 – 1977	University of North Carolina Wilmington	Wilmington, North Carolina	Inactive	(Note: Chapter formed from Delta Epsilon, established in 1969.)
119	**Western Illinois**	April 27, 1974	Western Illinois University	Macomb, Illinois	Active	(Note: Chapter formed from Lambda Tau Beta, established in 1972.)
120	Arkansas	November 15, 1975 – 1994	University of Arkansas	Fayetteville, Arkansas	Inactive	(Note: Chapter formed from Alpha Delta Upsilon, established in 1974.)
121	North Carolina State	April 16, 1977 – 1994; April 24, 2004 – 2019	North Carolina State University	Raleigh, North Carolina	Inactive	(Note: Chapter formed from Alpha Delta Upsilon, established in 1976.)
122	Baylor	April 15, 1978 – 1996	Baylor University	Waco, Texas	Inactive	(Note: Chapter formed from Delta Upsilon Kappa, established in 1977.)
123	Louisiana State	February 3, 1979 – 1983	Louisiana State University	Baton Rouge, Louisiana	Inactive	(Note: Chapter formed from Alpha Delta Upsilon, established in 1973.)
124	Massachusetts	April 19, 1980 – 2012	University of Massachusetts, Amherst	Amherst, Massachusetts	Inactive	(Note: Chapter formed from Alpha Delta Upsilon, established in 1979.)
125	Southwest Missouri State	May 2, 1981 – 1995	Missouri State University	Springfield, Missouri	Inactive	(Note: Chapter formed from Alpha Delta Upsilon, established in 1978.)
126	**Virginia Tech**	March 5, 1983 – 2002; April 15, 2011 – 2013	Virginia Tech	Blacksburg, Virginia	Colony	(Note: Chapter formed from Alpha Delta Upsilon, established in 1981. The chapter was reinstated as an associate chapter on November 16, 2024.)
127	**South Carolina**	April 9, 1983	University of South Carolina	Columbia, South Carolina	Active	(Note: Chapter formed from Alpha Delta Upsilon, established in 1976.)
128	Texas Tech	May 10, 1986 – 1987	Texas Tech University	Lubbock, Texas	Inactive	(Note: Chapter formed from Alpha Delta Upsilon, established in 1983.)
129	**Michigan Tech**	May 10, 1986	Michigan Technological University	Houghton, Michigan	Active	(Note: Alpha Delta Upsilon, established in 1980.)
130	Long Beach	April 25, 1987 – 1994	California State University, Long Beach	Long Beach, California	Inactive	(Note: Chapter formed from Alpha Delta Upsilon, established in 1985.)
131	Bakersfield	May 30, 1987 – 1994	California State University, Bakersfield	Bakersfield, California	Inactive	(Note: Chapter formed from Alpha Delta Upsilon, established in 1984.)
132	Santa Barbara	January 9, 1988 – 1999	University of California, Santa Barbara	Santa Barbara, California	Inactive	
133	**Culver-Stockton**	January 23, 1988	Culver–Stockton College	Canton, Missouri	Active	
134	**Guelph**	March 11, 1989	University of Guelph	Guelph, Ontario, Canada	Active	
135	Northern Colorado	April 23, 1989 – 2004	University of Northern Colorado	Greeley, Colorado	Inactive	
136	Calgary	March 24, 1990 – 1998	University of Calgary	Calgary, Alberta, Canada	Inactive	
137	McMaster	November 17, 1990 – 1999	McMaster University	Hamilton, Ontario, Canada	Inactive	(Note: Chapters formed from Delta Gamma Chi, established in 1988.)
138	**Iona**	February 1, 1991	Iona College	New Rochelle, New York	Active	
139	Texas A&M	November 2, 1991 – 1996	Texas A&M University	College Station, Texas	Inactive	
140	Arizona State	November 7, 1992 – 1999; February 24, 2006 – 2015	Arizona State University	Tempe, Arizona	Inactive	(Note: Chapter formed from Delta Tau, established in 1990.)
141	Victoria	May 1, 1993 – 2001	University of Victoria	Victoria, British Columbia	Inactive	(Note: Chapter formed from Pi Chi, established in 1990.)
142	**Carthage**	April 23, 1994	Carthage College	Kenosha, Wisconsin	Active	
143	St. Norbert	September 24, 1994 – 2019	St. Norbert College	De Pere, Wisconsin	Inactive	
144	Pace	March 4, 1995 – 2012	Pace University	Pleasantville, New York	Inactive	
145	Central Florida	March 25, 1995 – March 2025	University of Central Florida	Orlando, Florida	Inactive	(Note: The university and the national fraternity suspended the chapter for allegations of hazing.)
146	Shippensburg	April 8, 1995 – 2003	Shippensburg University of Pennsylvania	Shippensburg, Pennsylvania	Inactive	
147	Albany	April 22, 1995 – 1999	University at Albany, SUNY	Albany, New York	Inactive	(Note: Chapter formed from Delta Omicron Tau, established in 1985.)
148	Northern Arizona	October 16, 1999 – 2008	Northern Arizona University	Flagstaff, Arizona	Inactive	
149	Pan American	March 4, 2000 – 2011	University of Texas–Pan American	Edinburg, Texas	Inactive	
150	Northwestern State	November 3, 2001 – 2003	Northwestern State University	Natchitoches, Louisiana	Inactive	
151	North Florida	April 20, 2007 – Fall 2024	University of North Florida	Jacksonville, Florida	Inactive	
152	Webster	March 28, 2009 – 2011	Webster University	St. Louis, Missouri	Inactive	
153	Grand Valley State	April 23, 2010 – February 2017	Grand Valley State University	Allendale, Michigan	Inactive	
154	**Embry-Riddle**	September 4, 2010	Embry–Riddle Aeronautical University, Daytona Beach	Daytona Beach, Florida	Active	
155	Chattanooga	December 11, 2010 – 2015	University of Tennessee at Chattanooga	Chattanooga, Tennessee	Inactive	
156	**Boise State**	April 30, 2011	Boise State University	Boise, Idaho	Active	
157	**Elon**	April 21, 2012	Elon University	Elon, North Carolina	Active	
158	**James Madison**	April 27, 2014	James Madison University	Harrisonburg, Virginia	Active	
159	**Christopher Newport**	April 15, 2015	Christopher Newport University	Newport News, Virginia	Active	
160	**Quinnipiac**	April 22, 2018	Quinnipiac University	Hamden, Connecticut	Active	
161	**Loyola Marymount**	April 7, 2024	Loyola Marymount University	Los Angeles, California	Active	
162	**Villanova**	April 28, 2024	Villanova University	Villanova, Pennsylvania	Active	
163	**Tampa**	March 2, 2025	University of Tampa	Tampa, Florida	Active	
	**Idaho State Associate**		Idaho State University	Pocatello, Idaho	Colony	
	**Western Colorado Associate**		Western Colorado University	Gunnison, Colorado	Colony	
