= Howard Mortuary Chapel =

Historic church in Vermont, United States

- Louisa Howard Chapel
- U.S. National Register of Historic Places
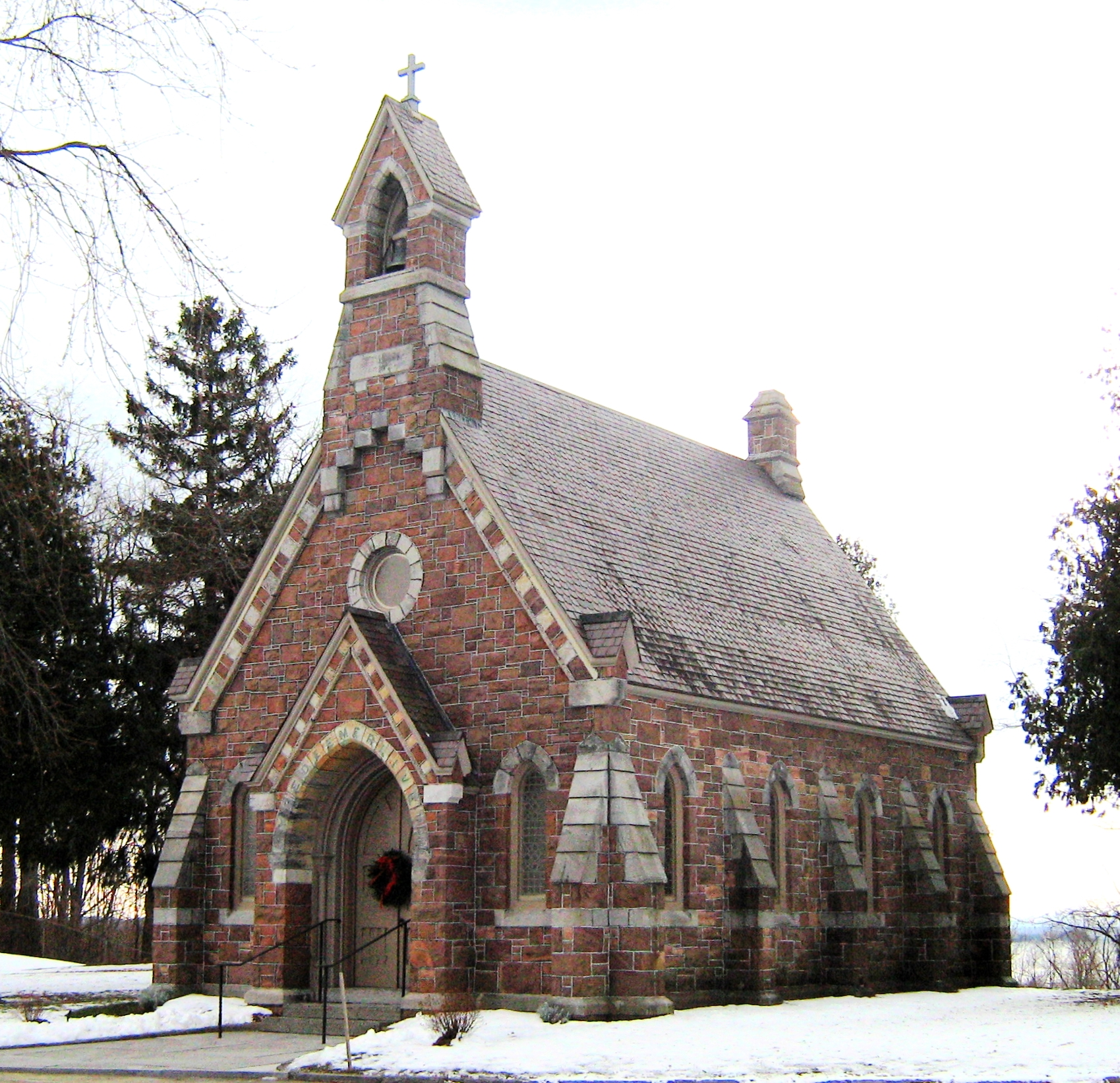
- (2009)

- Location within Vermont Location within the United States
- Location: 455 North Ave. Burlington, Vermont
- Coordinates: 44°29′32.82″N 73°13′44.544″W
- Built: 1882
- Architect: A. B. Fisher
- Architectural style: High Victorian Gothic
- NRHP reference No.: 99001272
- Added to NRHP: October 21, 1999

The Howard Mortuary Chapel is a historic chapel located at 455 North Avenue on the grounds of Lakeview Cemetery in Burlington, Vermont. Built in 1882, the chapel was designed in the High Victorian Gothic style by Alfred Benjamin Fisher, on cemetery grounds designed by E. C. Ryer in 1871. It was given to the City of Burlington by Hannah Louisa Howard. The chapel was added to the National Register of Historic Places in 1999.

== Description and history ==
Lakeview Cemetery is located north of downtown Burlington, between North Avenue and Burlington Bay. The Howard Chapel is located near the road, just south of the cemetery's main entrance. It is a masonry structure, built mainly out of Monkton quartzite, known locally as redstone. The redstone has an ashlar finish, and is laid in courses, with gray limestone trim. Its Gothic features include buttresses, lancet-arched windows, and a steeply pitched purple slate roof. Its east-facing gable rises to include a bellcote with a lancet-arched opening.

The chapel was built in 1882, funded by Hannah Louisa Howard, the daughter of successful hotelier John Howard, and a local philanthropist who generally concentrated her giving towards helping the disadvantaged of the city. Her gifts include those to the Home for Destitute Children, the Louisa Howard Mission and the Burlington Cancer Relief Association, as well as scholarships to attend the University of Vermont for poor students. It was designed by Alfred Benjamin Fisher, one of the city's leading architects of the period, and is a prominent local example of High Gothic Victorian architecture.

The chapel was used for memorial services until the 1940s, when it fell into disuse except for the storage of caskets. In the early 1990s, a "Friends of the Chapel" organization began fundraising efforts with the intention of rehabilitating the structure and returning it to use for services. Donations and grants paid for extensive repairs and improvements, including new heating and electrical service, repointing stonework, roof and window repairs, repainting interior woodwork, repairs to interior plaster, and repainting of the intricate stenciling on the interior of the building. Restoration work was completed in 2006, and the building was re-dedicated on July 30 of that year.

== See also ==
- Oak Hill Cemetery Chapel (Bellows Falls, Vermont)
- National Register of Historic Places listings in Chittenden County, Vermont
