= Welles House =

Welles House may refer to:

- Gideon Welles House, Glastonbury, Connecticut, listed on the National Register of Historic Places (NRHP) in Hartford County
- Welles-Shipman-Ward House, South Glastonbury, Connecticut, listed on the NRHP in Hartford County
- Larom-Welles Cottage, Saranac Lake, New York, listed on the NRHP in Franklin County
- Paul and Ellen Welles House, Raleigh, North Carolina, listed on the NRHP in Wake County
- Ellen and Charles F. Welles House, Wyalusing Township, Pennsylvania, listed on the NRHP in Bradford County

== See also ==
- Wells House (disambiguation)
