= North Elba, New York =

- Town
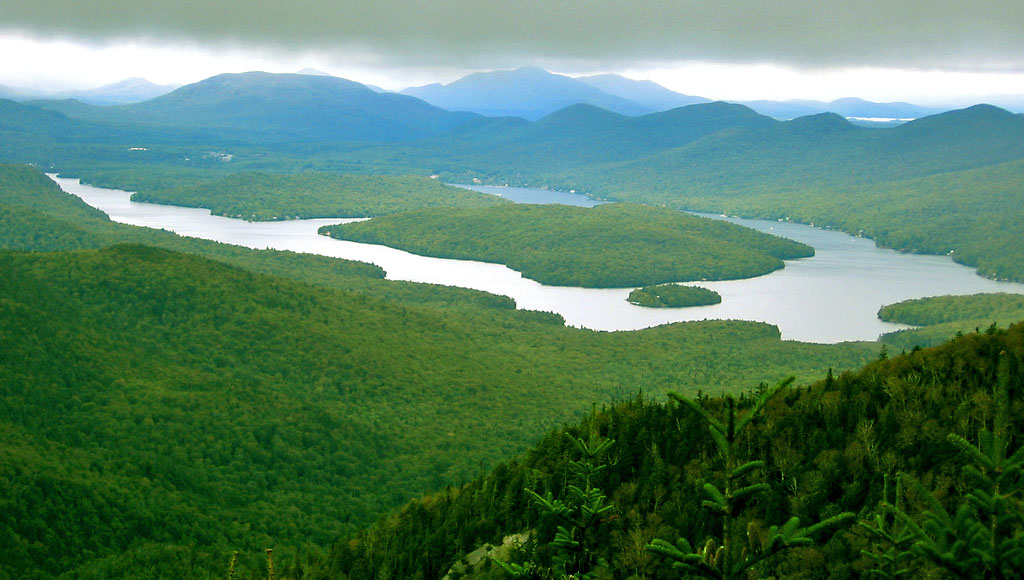
- Lake Placid

- Location in Essex County and the state of New York
- Coordinates: 44°17′18″N 74°1′11″W
- Country: United States
- State: New York
- County: Essex

Government
  - Type: Town Council
  - Town Supervisor: Derek T. Doty (D)
  - Town Council: Members' List: • Richard Cummings; • Emily Kilburn Polity; • Jason Leon; • Rick Preston

Area
  - Total: 156.43 sq mi (405.15 km^{2})
  - Land: 151.70 sq mi (392.89 km^{2})
  - Water: 4.74 sq mi (12.27 km^{2})
- Elevation: 1,949 ft (594 m)

Population (2020)
  - Total: 7,480
- Time zone: UTC-5 (Eastern (EST))
  - Summer (DST): UTC-4 (EDT)
- ZIP Codes: 12946 (Lake Placid); 12977 (Ray Brook); 12983 (Saranac Lake)
- FIPS code: 36-031-51935
- GNIS feature ID: 0979286
- Website: northelba.villageoflakeplacid.ny.gov

North Elba is a town in Essex County, New York, United States. The population was 7,480 at the 2020 census.

North Elba is on the western edge of the county. It is 57 miles (92 km) by road southwest of Plattsburgh, 112 miles (180 km) south-southwest of Montreal, and 138 miles (222 km) north of Albany. While it is only 59 miles (95 km) west-southwest of Burlington, Vermont, one would have to either take a ferry across Lake Champlain, or drive around it. The entirety of the village of Lake Placid is located within the boundaries of North Elba, as is part of the village of Saranac Lake.

== History ==
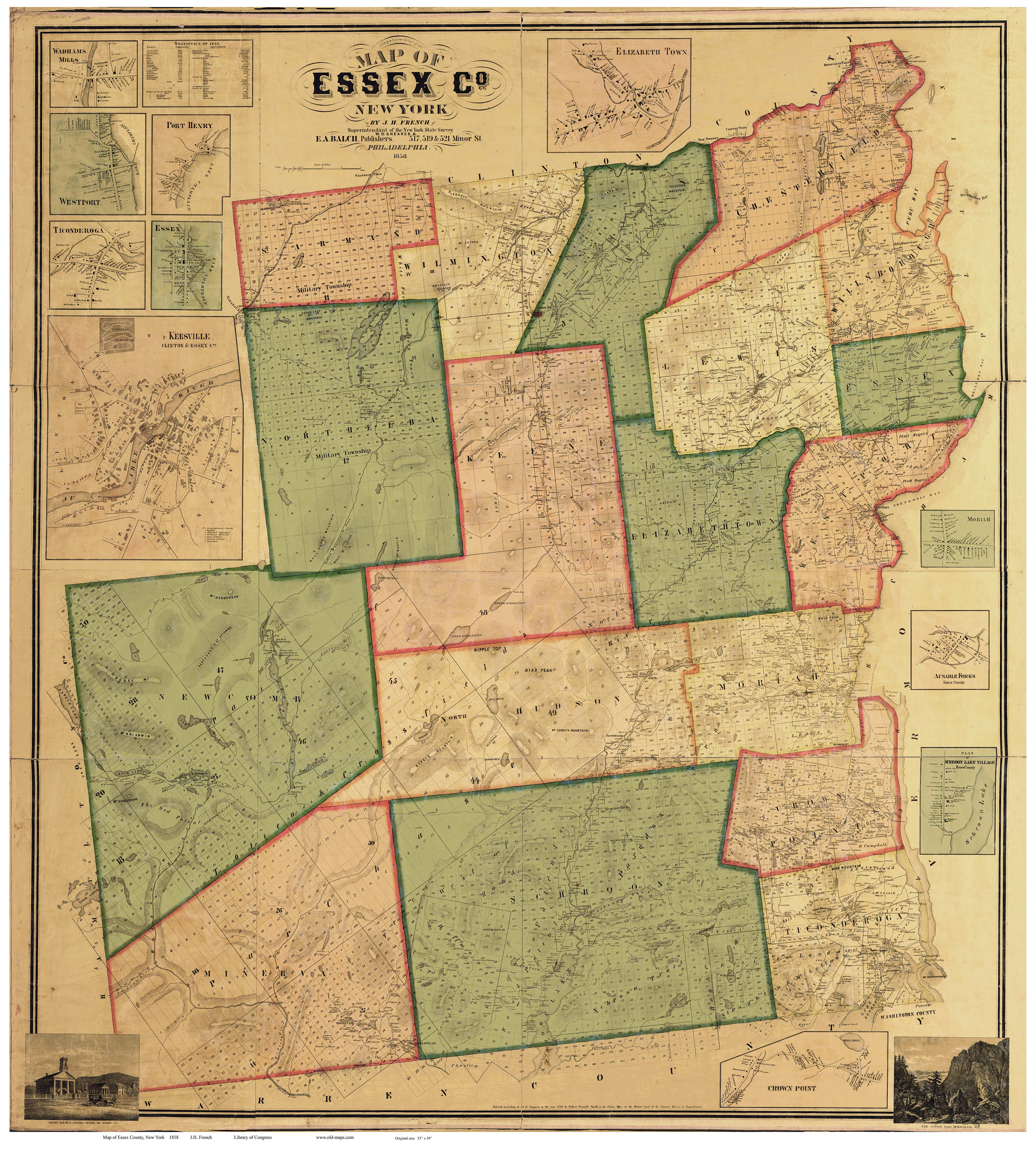
Essex County, New York, 1858 map

The town was first settled around 1814. In 1840 there were six families in the future North Elba, which was formed from part of the town of Keene in 1849.

The abolitionist John Brown, attracted by the views of local abolitionist Gerrit Smith, came to the town in 1849 to found a community for former black slaves. Smith was trying to resettle free blacks on land in the area, but it was not suitable for family farming. Brown left from his farm for the raid on Harpers Ferry in 1859.

A visitor in 1861 noted that in North Elba there was "a school house, which serves for this purpose, for a church, and a town hall." At that time, when the village of Lake Placid did not exist, a map of 1858 reveals that North Elba was at that time also a hamlet, centered at the intersection of what are today (2021) New York State Route 73 and Adirondack Loj roads. The town and its village, Lake Placid, were the site of the 1932 and 1980 Winter Olympics.

Barngalow and the Larom-Welles Cottage were listed on the National Register of Historic Places in 1992.

== Notable people ==
- John Brown, the famous abolitionist, who was executed after his conviction of treason, sedition, and murder by the state of Virginia, is buried on his family's farm in North Elba, as is his son Watson Brown. Twelve other participants in Brown's raid on Harpers Ferry, including his son Oliver, were moved in 1899 to a common grave near Brown's.
- Melvil Dewey, inventor of the Dewey Decimal System, founded a resort in the town.

== Geography ==
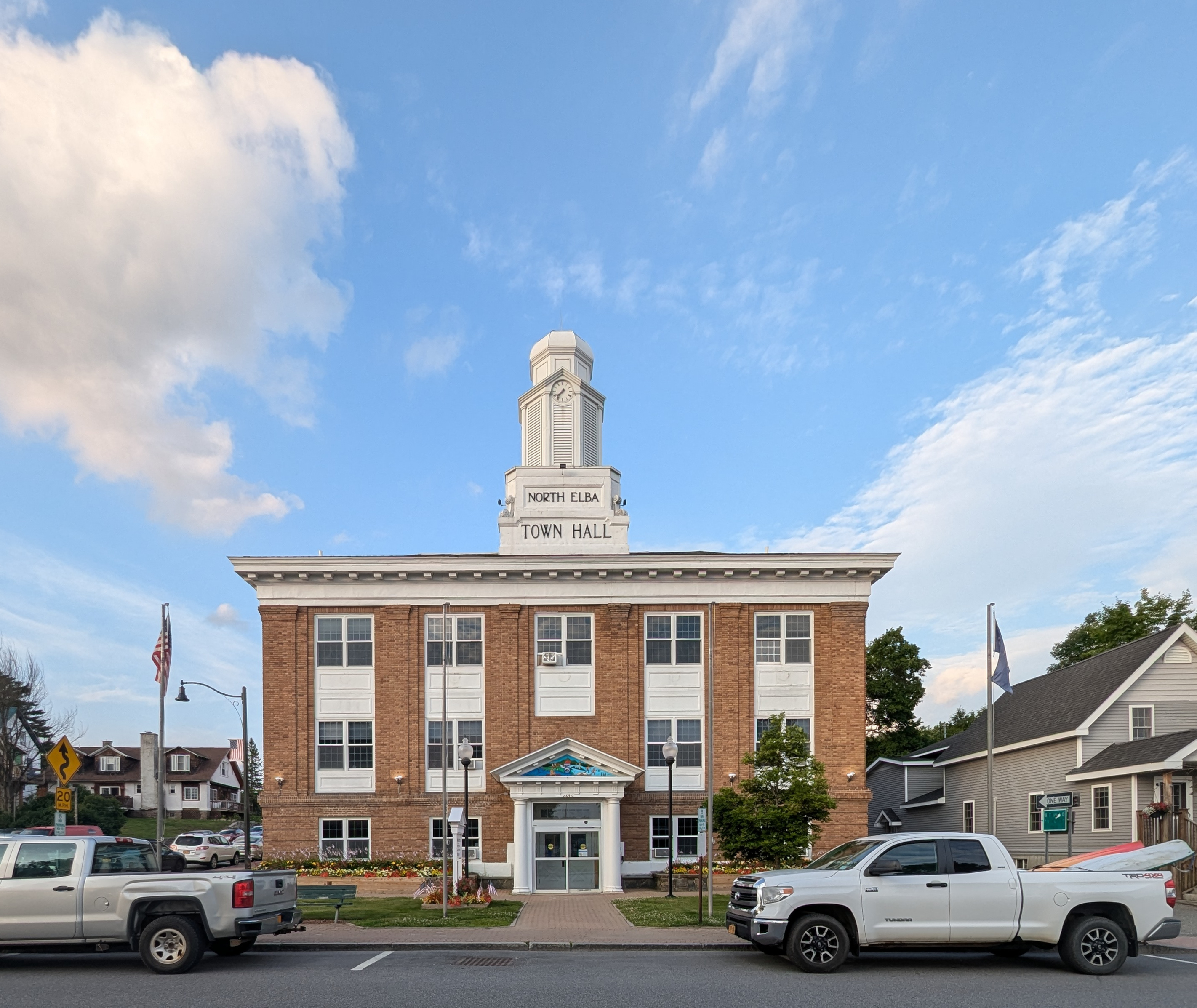
North Elba Town Hall

According to the United States Census Bureau, the town has a total area of 156.4 square miles (405.0 km^{2}), of which 151.7 square miles (392.8 km^{2}) is land and 4.7 square miles (12.3 km^{2}), or 3.03%, is water.

Some of the High Peaks of the Adirondack Park are in the southern part of town. The West Branch of the Au Sable River flows out the northeastern corner of the town.

The western town line is the border of Franklin County.

New York State Route 73 and New York State Route 86 are east–west highways in the town that intersect at Lake Placid village.

== Sites ==
- North Country Community College
- The Adirondack Scenic Railroad traverses the town
- John Brown Farm State Historic Site

== Demographics ==
Historical population
Census	Pop.	Note	%±
1850	210		—
1860	366		74.3%
1870	349		−4.6%
1880	480		37.5%
1890	1,117		132.7%
1900	1,986		77.8%
1910	3,896		96.2%
1920	4,343		11.5%
1930	6,472		49.0%
1940	6,092		−5.9%
1950	6,069		−0.4%
1960	6,005		−1.1%
1970	5,776		−3.8%
1980	6,597		14.2%
1990	7,870		19.3%
2000	8,661		10.1%
2010	8,957		3.4%
2020	7,480		−16.5%
U.S. Decennial Census

As of the census of 2000, there were 8,661 people, 2,944 households, and 1,675 families residing in the town. The population density was 57.0 inhabitants per square mile (22.0/km^{2}). There were 3,991 housing units at an average density of 26.3 per square mile (10.2/km^{2}). The racial makeup of the town was 85.71% White, 10.10% African American, 0.40% Native American, 0.87% Asian, 0.20% Pacific Islander, 1.82% from other races, and 0.90% from two or more races. Hispanic or Latino of any race were 6.51% of the population.

There were 2,944 households, out of which 26.4% had children under the age of 18 living with them, 44.9% were married couples living together, 8.4% had a female householder with no husband present, and 43.1% were non-families. 35.2% of all households were made up of individuals, and 12.7% had someone living alone who was 65 years of age or older. The average household size was 2.21 and the average family size was 2.90.

In the town, the population was spread out, with 17.6% under the age of 18, 7.8% from 18 to 24, 39.6% from 25 to 44, 21.5% from 45 to 64, and 13.4% who were 65 years of age or older. The median age was 37 years. For every 100 females, there were 146.3 males. For every 100 females age 18 and over, there were 158.2 males.

The median income for a household in the town was $35,329, and the median income for a family was $44,828. Males had a median income of $27,787 versus $23,356 for females. The per capita income for the town was $19,259. About 7.3% of families and 10.9% of the population were below the poverty line, including 11.9% of those under age 18 and 10.2% of those age 65 or over.

== Communities and locations in North Elba ==
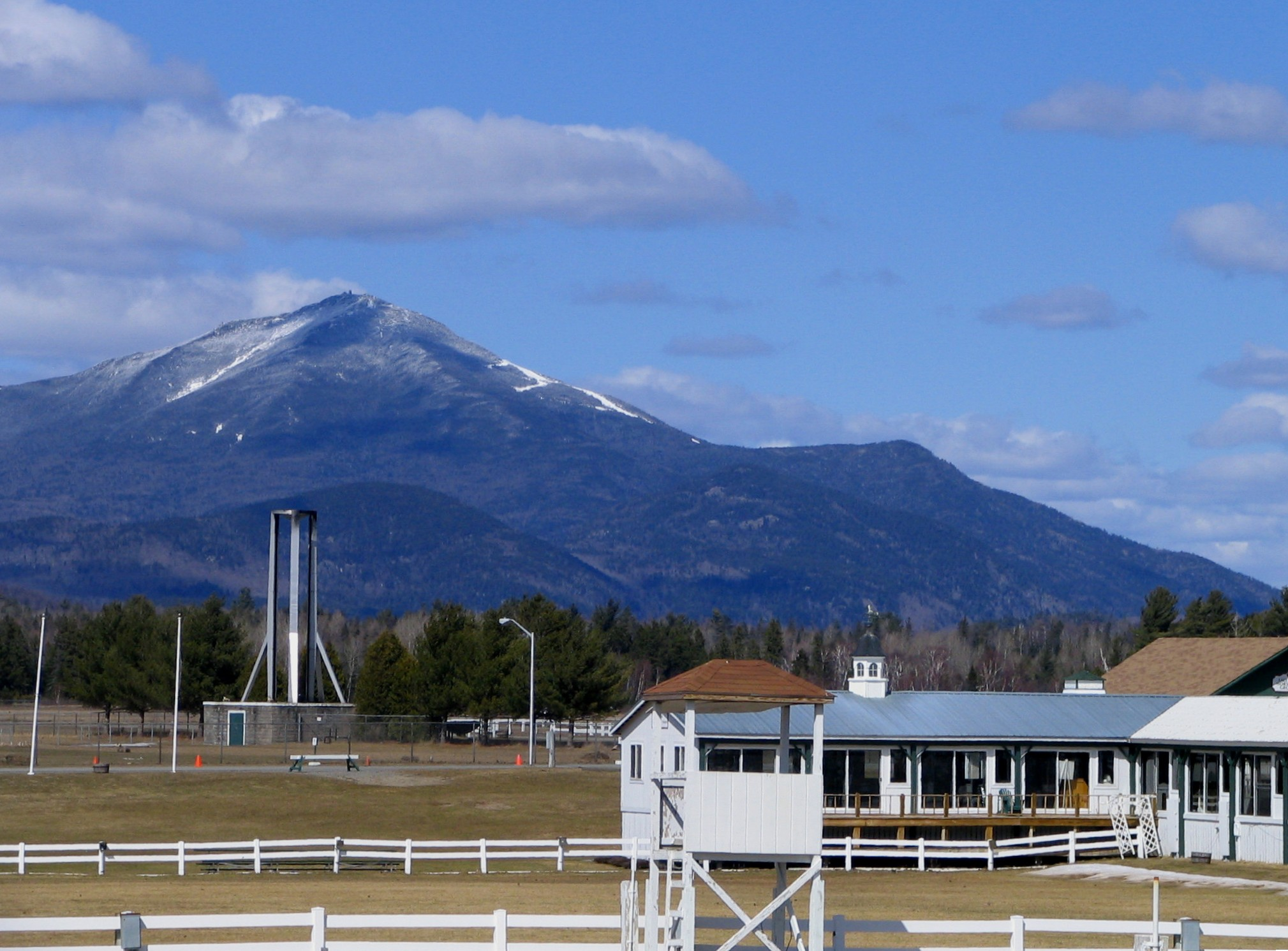
The North Elba Showgrounds, showing the Horse Rings, Olympic Cauldron, and Whiteface Mountain

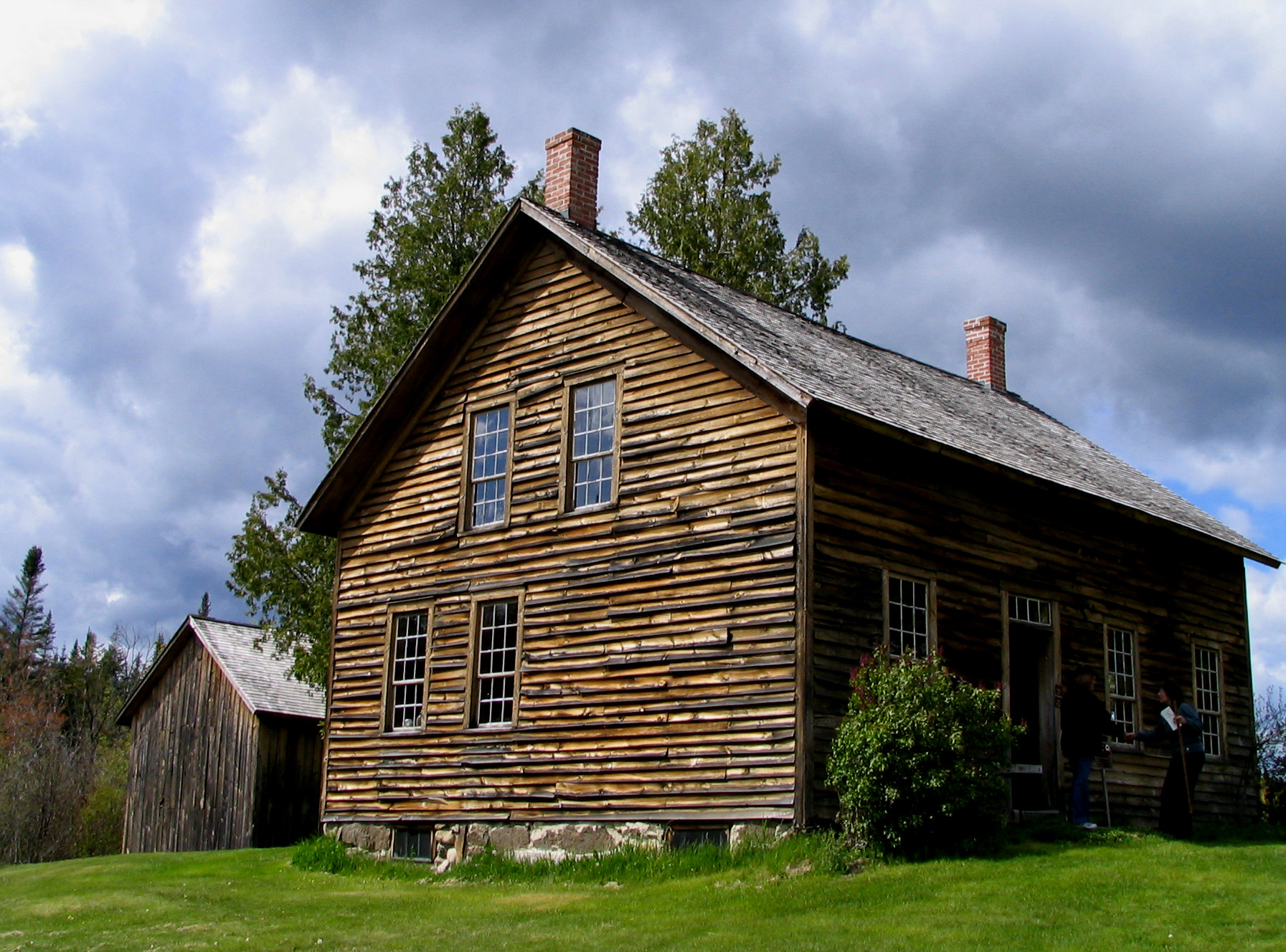
John Brown's Farm, North Elba, New York

- Buck Island – An island in Lake Placid.
- Lake Placid – A lake in the north-central part of the town.
- Lake Placid – A village near the center of the town at the junction of NY-73 and NY-86.
- Lake Placid Airport (LKP) – A general aviation airport south of Lake Placid village.
- Mirror Lake – A small lake adjacent to Lake Placid village.
- Moose Island – An island in Lake Placid north of Buck Island.
- North Elba – The hamlet of North Elba is southeast of Lake Placid village on NY-73.
- Ray Brook – A hamlet between Saranac Lake and Lake Placid villages on NY-86.
  - Federal Correctional Institution, Ray Brook – A federal prison near Ray Brook hamlet. It is a medium security facility for male prisoners. During its construction, it was used as an Olympic village for competitors.
- Round Lake – A small lake, east of North Elba village.
- Saranac Lake – A village, a part of which is at the western border of the town on NY-86.
- Timbuctoo (1850–1870) – a failed community of Black farmers, brought there by John Brown
- Undercliff – A hamlet on the northwestern shore of Lake Placid.
- Whiteface – A hamlet on the southwestern shore of Lake Placid.
