= Barngalow =

Historic house in New York, United States

- U.S. National Register of Historic Places
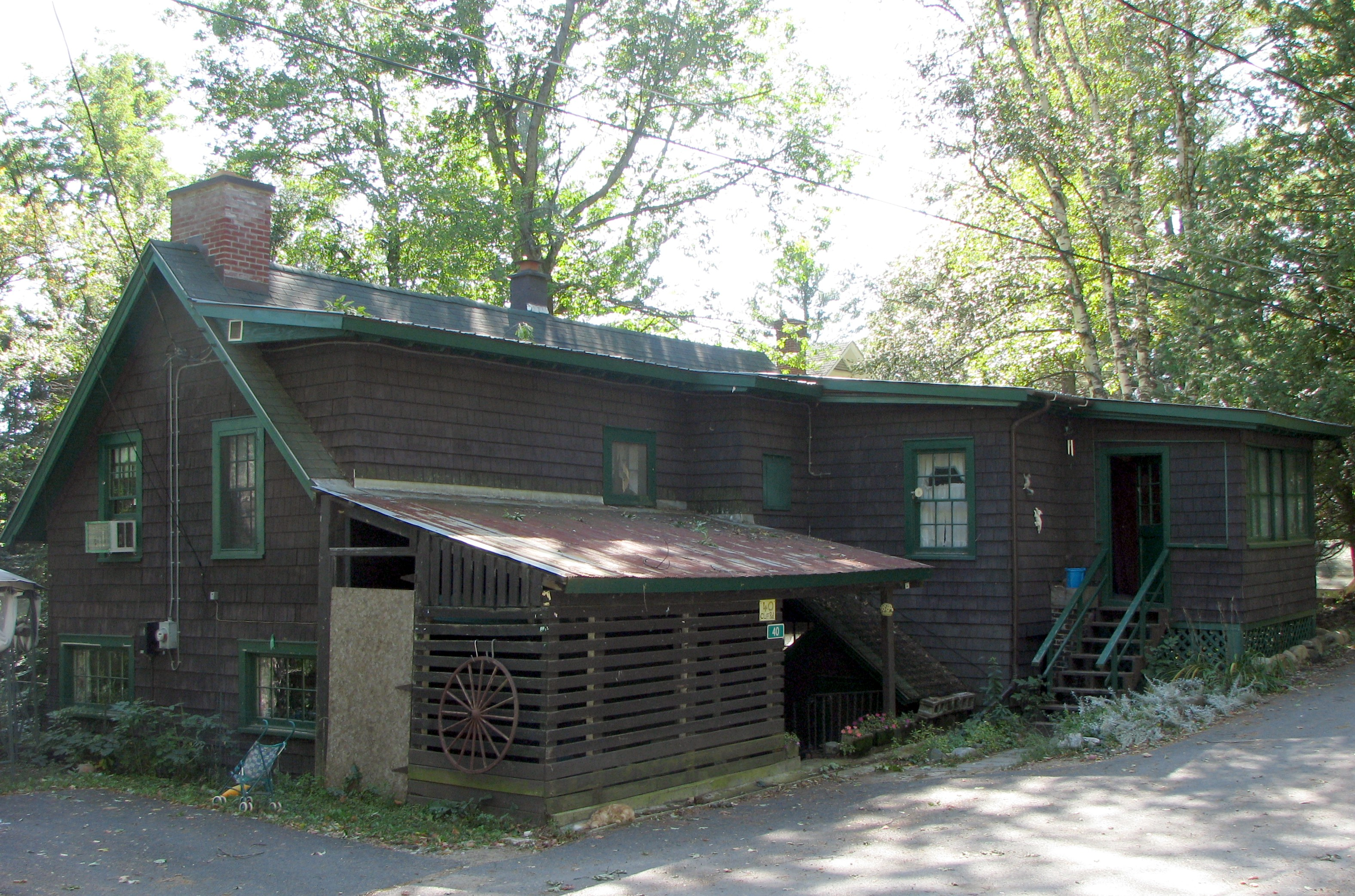
- Barngalow, September 2008

- Location within New York Location within the United States
- Location: 108½ Park Ave., Saranac Lake, North Elba, New York, U.S.
- Coordinates: 44°20′2″N 74°7′44″W
- Area: less than one acre
- Built: 1905
- MPS: Saranac Lake MPS
- NRHP reference No.: 92001427
- Added to NRHP: November 6, 1992

Barngalow is a historic cure cottage located at Saranac Lake in the town of North Elba, Essex and Franklin County, New York. It was built in 1905 and is a two-story wood-frame structure that was originally a barn and converted to residential use about 1910. It has a bungalow form and features a gable roof and shed roof dormers.

It was listed on the National Register of Historic Places in 1992.
