= Edward Wells House =

Historic house in Vermont, United States

- U.S. National Register of Historic Places
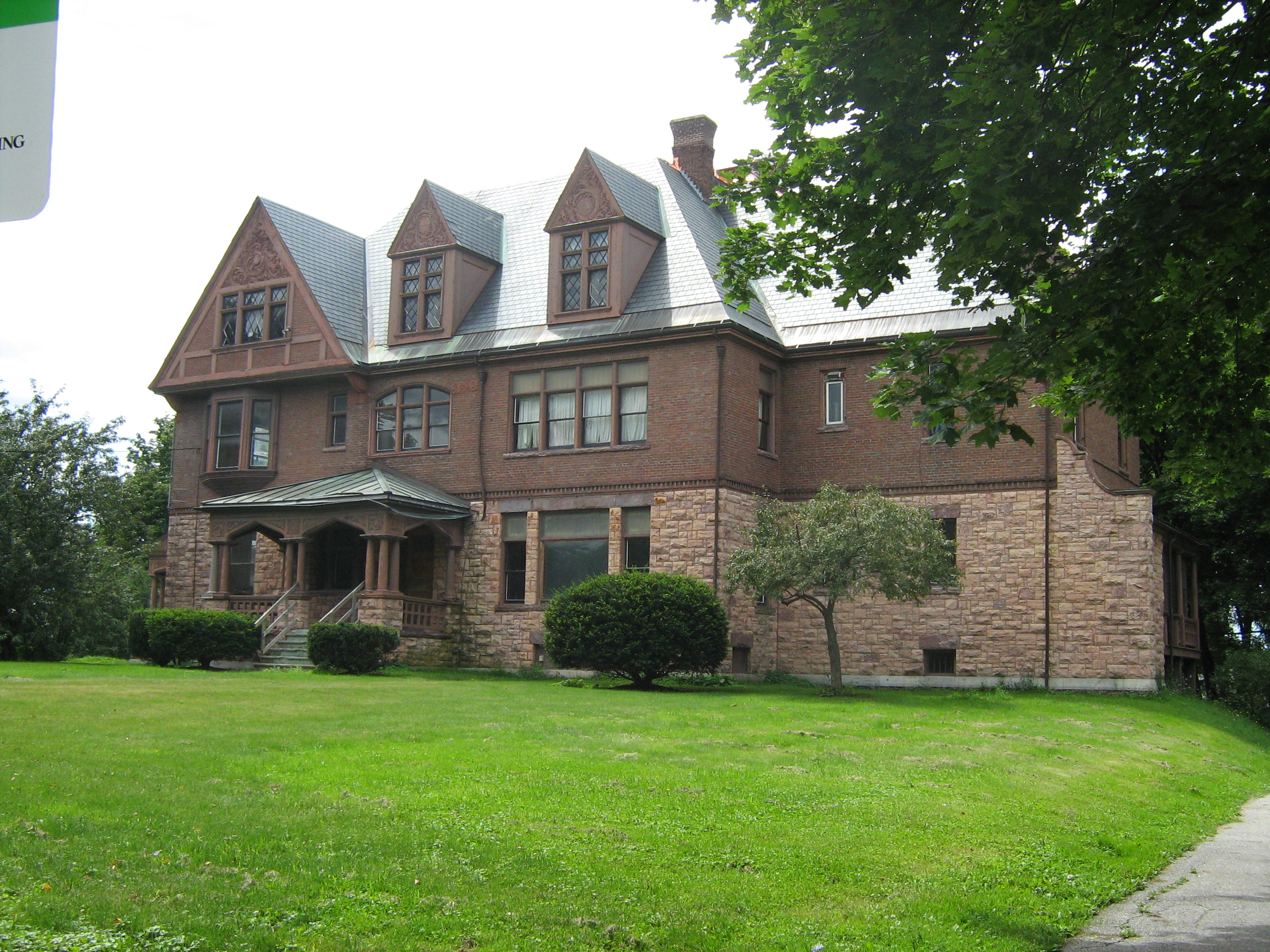

- Location within Vermont
- Location: 61 Summit St., Burlington, Vermont
- Coordinates: 44°28′28″N 73°12′11″W
- Area: less than one acre
- Built: 1891
- Built by: Fisher, Alfred B.
- Architect: Newcomb, E. A. P.
- Architectural style: Queen Anne
- NRHP reference No.: 79000220
- Added to NRHP: October 3, 1979

The Edward Wells House is a historic house at 61 Summit Street in Burlington, Vermont. Built in 1891–92 for the president of a patent medicine maker, it is one of the city's finest examples of Queen Anne Victorian architecture executed in brick and stone. It was listed on the National Register of Historic Places in 1979. The house was for many years home to a local fraternity called Delta Psi; is now owned by the University of Vermont.

== Description and history ==
The Edward Wells House is located in eastern Burlington, at the northwest corner of Maple and Summit Streets. It is a large 2½ story structure, built out of stone and brick, capped by a truncated hip roof. The first floor is finished in rustically cut reddish limestone, laid in random courses, while the upper levels are finished in brown brick. The main facade is three bays wide, each with a different configuration of windows and decoration. Each bay is topped in the roof by a gabled dormer, that on the left larger than the other two. All three dormers feature terra cotta panels in the gable peaks, and have diamond-paned sash windows. The main entrance is sheltered by a deep hip-roofed porch, supported by clusters of round columns set on stone piers. The interior features lavish woodwork.

The house was built in 1891–92 for Edward Wells, who rose to great fortune in the manufacture of patent medicines. Wells was instrumental in the success of the Wells-Richardson Company, which advertised widely, and sold its products by mail order. The house was designed by Edgar Allen Poe Newcomb of Boston, Massachusetts. Its interior wood carvings were executed by Albert H. Whittekind of New York City, whose credits include carvings in the New York Public Library Main Branch and the current Chittenden County Superior Courthouse. Wells died in 1907, and his house was acquired in 1924 by the Delta Psi fraternity. By 2003, the fraternity was in decline, and in 2007 the house was purchased by the University of Vermont, which adapted for use as a guest quarters for visiting alumnae.

== See also ==
- National Register of Historic Places listings in Chittenden County, Vermont
