= E. C. Ryer =

American architect

Edward C. Ryer
- Occupation: Architect

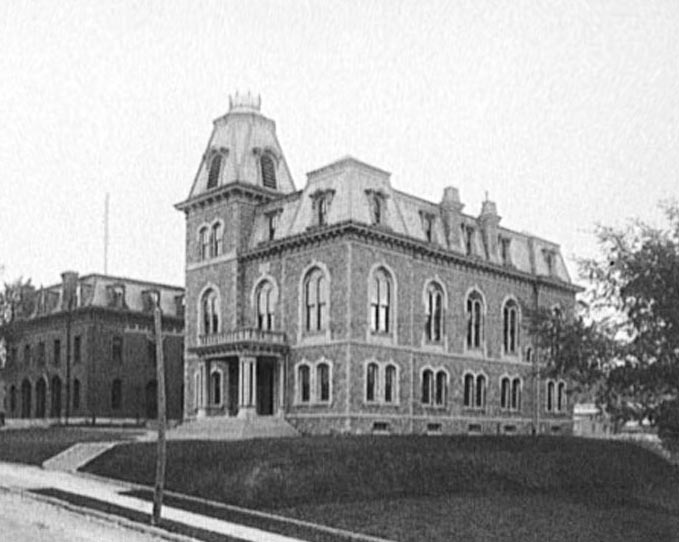
County Courthouse, Burlington, 1871.

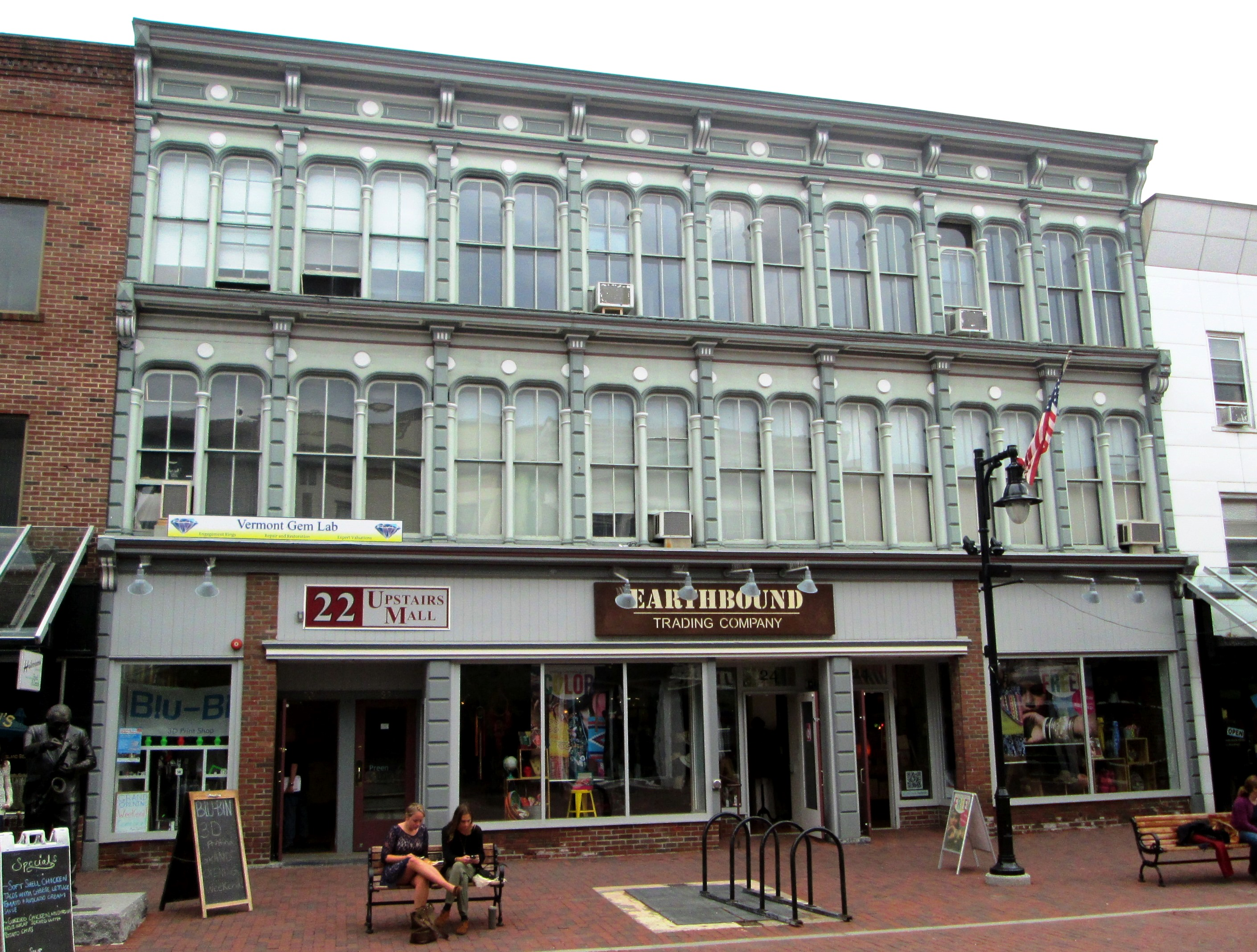
Bacon Block, Burlington, 1874.

E. C. Ryer was an American architect from Vermont, where he was one of the earliest local architects.

Ryer opened his office as in Burlington in 1866. In the late 1870s, he left architectural practice to join the Vermont Mutual Life Insurance Company in Montpelier.

Several of Ryer's works contribute to the National Register of Historic Places.

== Architectural works ==
- 1868 - Grounds, Our Lady of the Holy Rosary Cemetery, Richmond, Vermont
- 1869 - Kilburn & Gates Mill, Kilburn St, Burlington, Vermont
- 1869 - Weston's Market, 193-195 College St, Burlington, Vermont
- 1870 - Burlington High School, 348 College St, Burlington, Vermont
  - Demolished.
- 1871 - Chittenden County Courthouse (former), 180 Church St, Burlington, Vermont
  - Burned in 1982.
- 1871 - Grounds, Lakeview Cemetery, 455 North Ave, Burlington, Vermont
- 1872 - Sexton's Residence, Lakeview Cemetery, 455 North Ave, Burlington, Vermont
- 1873 - Franklin County Courthouse, 17 Church St, St. Albans, Vermont
- 1874 - Bacon Block, 20-26 Church St, Burlington, Vermont
- 1876 - St. James Episcopal Church, 14216 Main St, Au Sable Forks, New York
