= Old Chittenden County Courthouse =

- Chittenden County Courthouse
- Formerly listed on the U.S. National Register of Historic Places
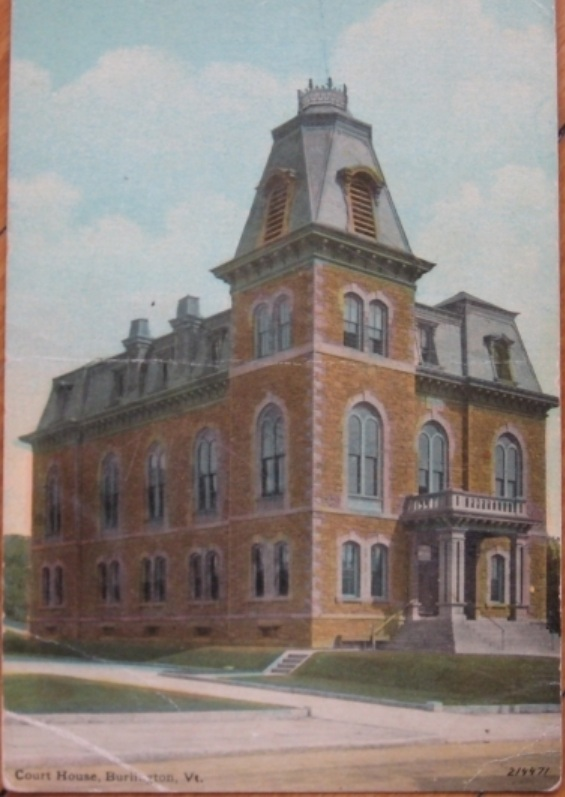
- Postcard view, 1900

- Location within Vermont Location within the United States
- Interactive map showing the location of Old Chittenden County Courthouse
- Location: 180 Church St., Burlington, Vermont
- Coordinates: 44°28′2″N 73°12′44″W
- Area: less than one acre
- Built: 1872
- Architect: Ryer, E. C.
- Architectural style: Second Empire
- NRHP reference No.: 73000192

Significant dates
- Added to NRHP: April 11, 1973
- Removed from NRHP: March 22, 2016

The Old Chittenden County Courthouse was a historic government building at 180 Church Street (between Main and King Streets) in downtown Burlington, the county seat of Chittenden County, Vermont. Built in 1872, it was a richly decorated example of Second Empire architecture, occupying a prominent position in the city's civic nucleus, which also included Burlington City Hall and the United States Post Office and Custom House. It served as the county courthouse until it was destroyed by fire on February 9, 1982. It was listed on the National Register of Historic Places in 1973, and removed from the register in 2016.

== See also ==
- National Register of Historic Places listings in Chittenden County, Vermont
