= Oak Hill Cemetery Chapel (Bellows Falls, Vermont) =

- U.S. National Register of Historic Places
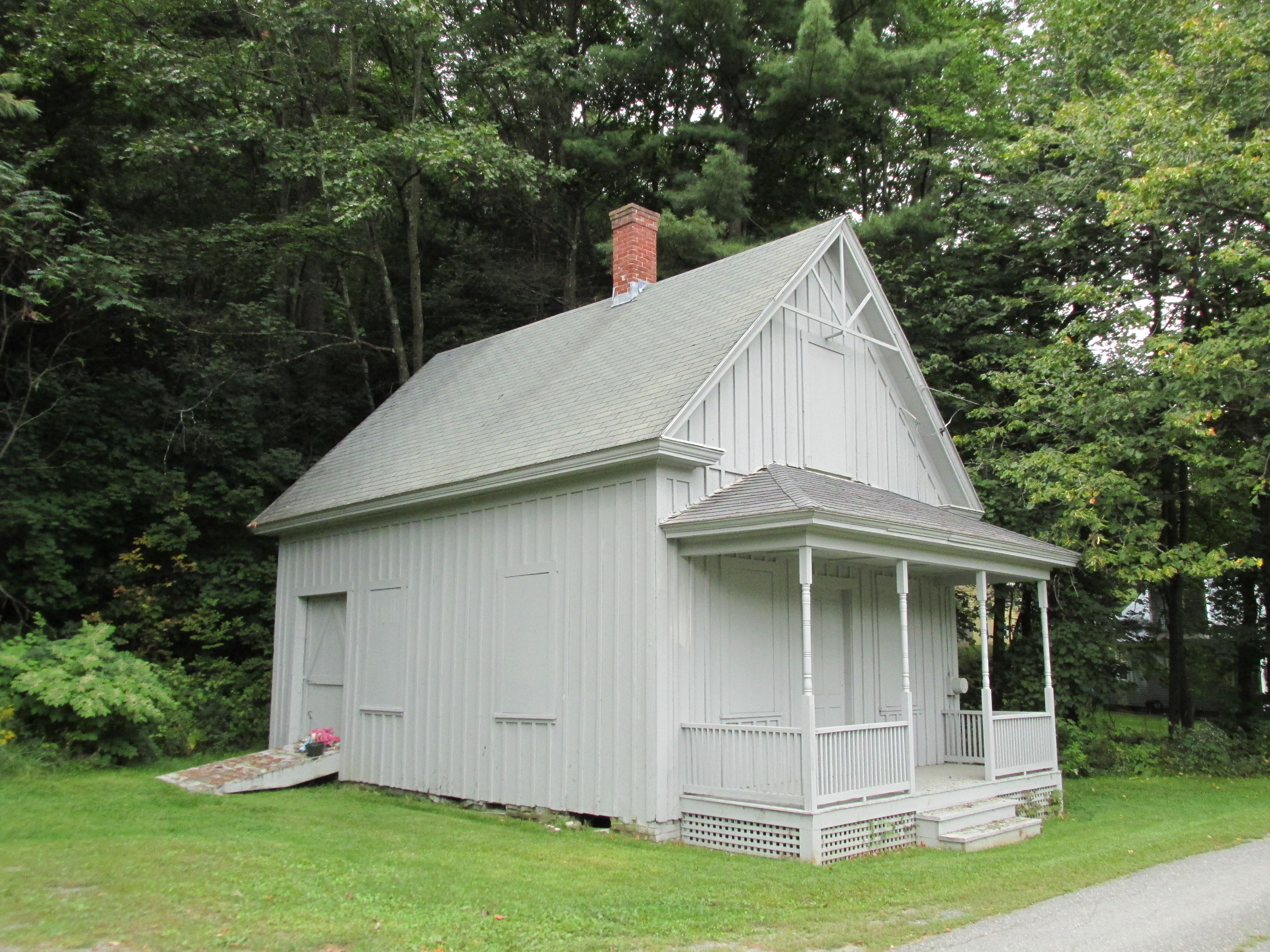
- Oak Hill Cemetery Chapel

- Location within Vermont Location within the United States
- Location: Off Pleasant St., Bellows Falls, Vermont
- Coordinates: 43°7′32″N 72°27′10″W
- Area: 0.1 acres (0.040 ha)
- Built: c. 1885
- Architectural style: Gothic Revival, Vernacular Gothic Revival
- NRHP reference No.: 91001613
- Added to NRHP: November 14, 1991

The Oak Hill Cemetery Chapel is a historic chapel, located in the Oak Hill Cemetery off Pleasant Street in Bellows Falls, Vermont. Built about 1885, it is one of a small number of 19th-century cemetery chapels in the state, and is the most modestly decorated of those, with vernacular Gothic Revival elements. The building was listed on the National Register of Historic Places in 1991.

== Description and history ==
Oak Hill Cemetery is located southwest of the main village of Bellows Falls, on a terrace of the eponymous hill, which rises higher to its west. Saxtons River Road (Vermont Route 121) is downslope, separated by a wide band of forest, and the main entrance is on Pleasant Street, at its northern end. The chapel is located at the western edge of the cemetery near its northern edge, which there abuts Birch Street. The chapel is a modest 1-1/2 story wood frame structure, about 20.5 by 26.5 feet (6.2 m × 8.1 m) in size, with a gabled roof, vertical board-and-batten siding, and a 20th-century brick foundation. The front faces east, and has a single-story hip-roof porch, with turned posts, and there is simple Stick style woodwork in the roof gable. The facade is three bays wide, with the entrance flanked by sash windows, and a single sash window in the gable. Side elevations are also three bays wide, with a sliding shed door in the rear bay of the south side.

The interior is divided into two spaces. The front space houses the chapel, whose walls and ceiling are finished in varnished tongue-and-groove boards. The rear of the building is unfinished, and has always served as an equipment storage area; it is accessed via the sliding door on the south, and via an inside door.

Oak Hill Cemetery was founded in 1875, as the second municipally owned cemetery in the town of Rockingham, of which Bellows Falls is a part. (The first cemetery, established 1845, was transferred to a Roman Catholic organization in 1878.) It was enlarged in 1883, and the town authorized significant funds for its improvement in 1884. It is believed that the chapel was built following this authorization, as there is no mention in detailed earlier records of its construction. The building underwent a major restoration in 1990.

== See also ==
- Howard Mortuary Chapel
- National Register of Historic Places listings in Windham County, Vermont
