= John M. Wells House =

Historic house in Massachusetts, United States

- U.S. National Register of Historic Places
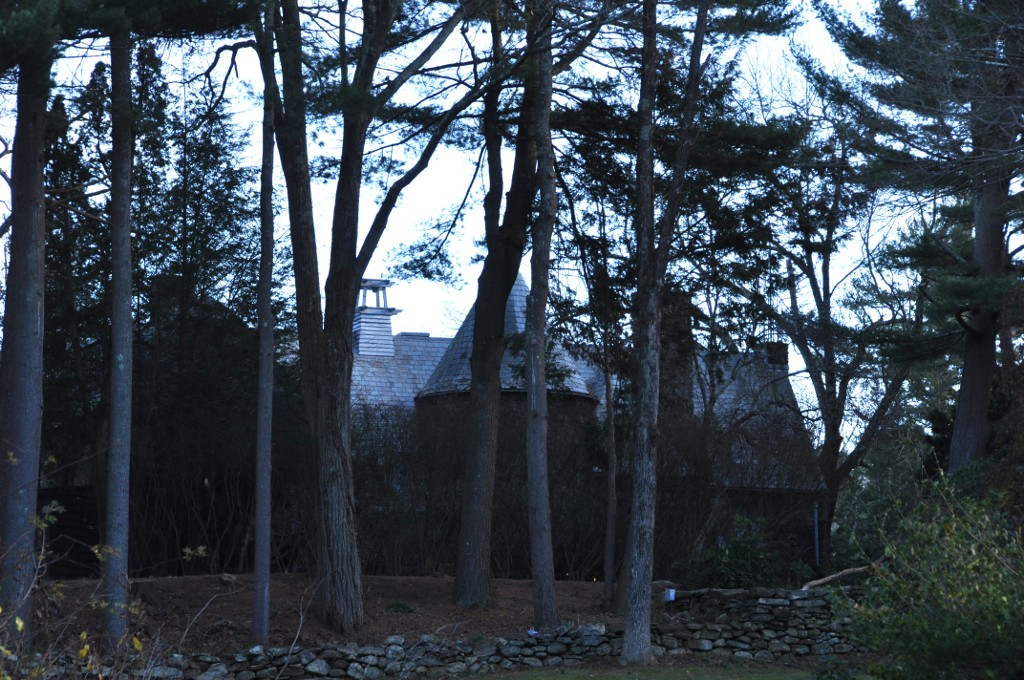

- Location within Massachusetts Location within the United States
- Location: 491 Eastford Rd., Southbridge, Massachusetts
- Coordinates: 42°3′32″N 72°2′55″W
- Built: 1927
- Architectural style: Renaissance, French Chateau
- MPS: Southbridge MRA
- NRHP reference No.: 89000553
- Added to NRHP: June 22, 1989

The John M. Wells House is a historic house at 491 Eastford Road in Southbridge, Massachusetts, United States. The Wells family were the founders of the American Optical Company, a leading business in Southbridge. The house John M. Wells had built in 1927 was reminiscent of a French chateau, and was the first to be built in the Cohasse Farms section of Southbridge. The only previous development in the rural area had been the development of the Cohasse Country Club in 1919. Wells' cousin George would build a more modern house nearby in 1932.

The house was listed on the National Register of Historic Places in 1989.

== See also ==
- National Register of Historic Places listings in Southbridge, Massachusetts
- National Register of Historic Places listings in Worcester County, Massachusetts
