= Larom-Welles Cottage =

Historic house in New York, United States

- U.S. National Register of Historic Places
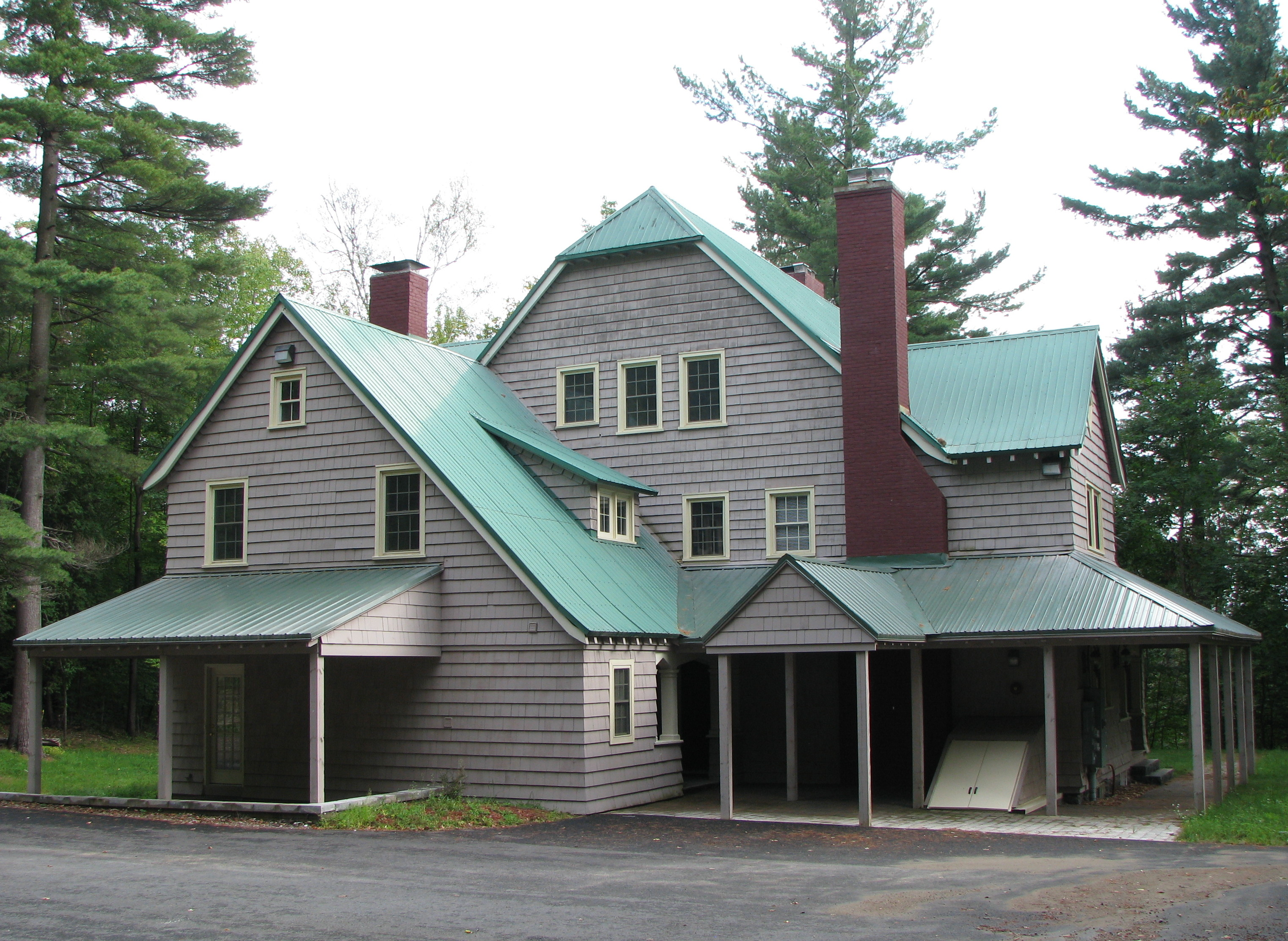
- Larom-Welles Cottage, September 2008

- Location within New York Location within the United States
- Location: 110 Park Ave., Saranac Lake, North Elba, New York, U.S.
- Coordinates: 44°20′2″N 74°7′45″W
- Area: 1.2 acres (0.49 ha)
- Built: 1905
- Architectural style: Shingle Style
- MPS: Saranac Lake MPS
- NRHP reference No.: 92001478
- Added to NRHP: November 06, 1992

Larom-Welles Cottage is a historic cure cottage located at Saranac Lake in the town of North Elba, Essex and Franklin County, New York. It was built about 1905 and is a three-story wood-frame structure in the Shingle Style on a stone foundation and surmounted by a metal jerkin head gable roof. It has a two-story wing with a shed roof dormer. It has a two bay verandah and entrance porch with a second story sleeping porch. Also on the second floor is a cure porch. It was originally built for the priest of St. Luke's Episcopal Church, later the home of Dr. Edward Welles, a pioneer in thoracic surgery, who practiced at the Adirondack Cottage Sanitarium. The house has been converted to six units.

It was listed on the National Register of Historic Places in 1992.
