= George B. and Ruth D. Wells House =

Historic house in Massachusetts, United States

- U.S. National Register of Historic Places
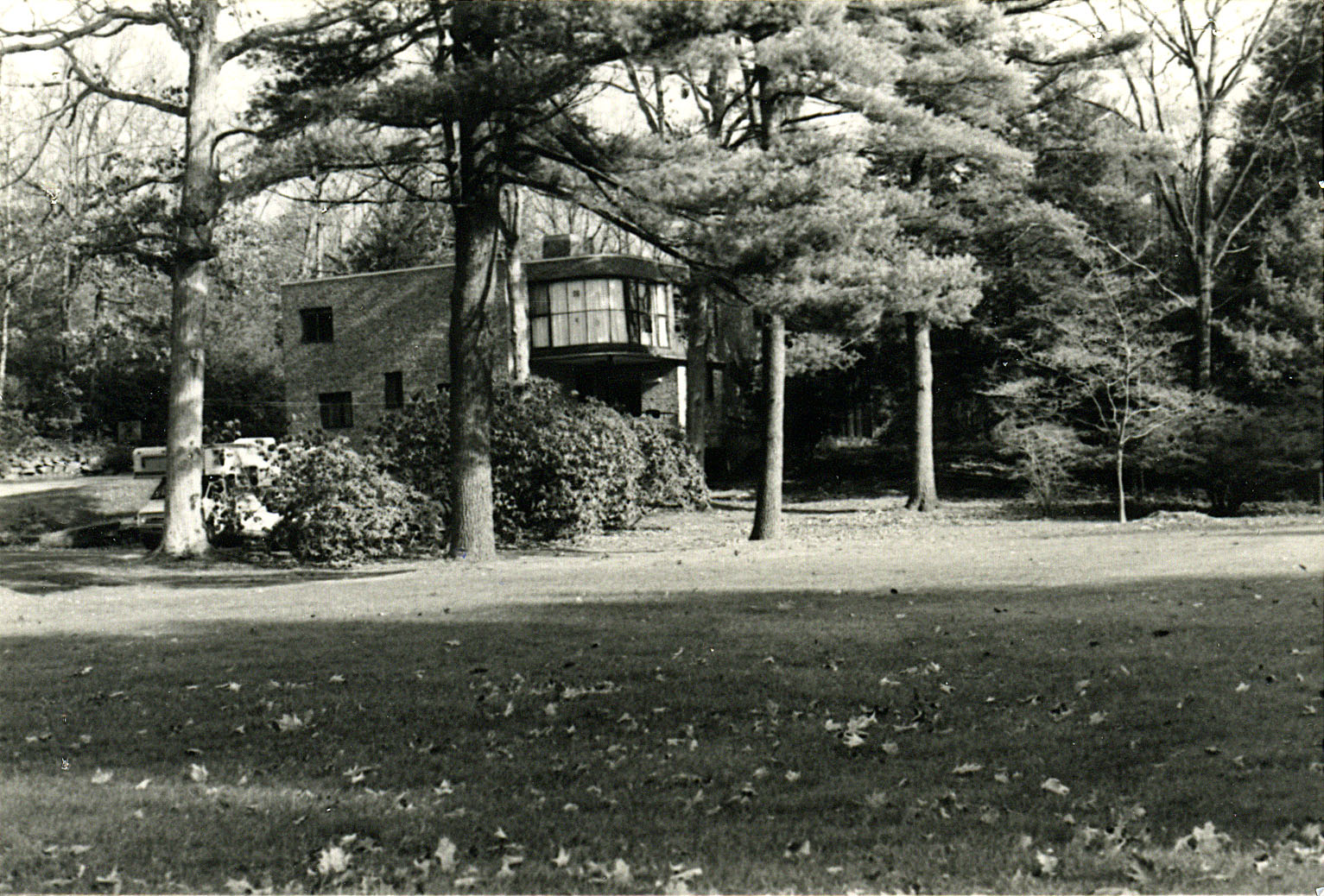
- mid-1980s photo

- Location within Massachusetts Location within the United States
- Location: Durfee Rd., Southbridge, Massachusetts
- Coordinates: 42°3′43″N 72°3′1″W
- Built: 1932
- Architect: Wood, Paul A.
- Architectural style: International Style
- MPS: Southbridge MRA
- NRHP reference No.: 89000548
- Added to NRHP: June 22, 1989

The George B. and Ruth D. Wells House is a historic house on Durfee Road in Southbridge, Massachusetts. Built in 1932 to a design by Boston architect Paul Wood, it is one of the first International Style houses to be built in the northeastern United States. The house was listed on the National Register of Historic Places in 1989. It is not generally accessible to the public, but is vacant and was listed for sale in 2014.

== Description and history ==
The Wells House stands on about 10 acres (4.0 ha) of wooded land on the north side of Eastford Road in southern Southbridge, separated from the road by a portion of the Cohasse Country Club's golf course. The house is a large single-story structure with about 9,000 square feet of living space, organized as a series of block-like shapes. It has steel framing, and its walls are clad in either beige brick, or floor-to-ceiling glass windows set in black metal frames. The brick, originally painted white to set it off from the window frames, has returned to its natural color over time. The interior of the house is organized to take advantage of daylight, with living spaces generally facing east, south, and west, with the northern part of the structure taken up by passageways and utilitarian parts of the house.

George Wells was a scion of the Wells family, which owned the locally prominent American Optical Company, and the grandson of architect Daniel Burnham. Wells and his wife Ruth, having seen International Style houses on travels to Europe, decided to build a house in that style, but had difficulty finding an architect in Boston or New York City who worked in the style. He eventually commissioned Boston architect Paul Wood to do the design, and the house was built in 1932. The house, built in a rural section of Southbridge near his cousin John's French chateau-style house, was a marked contrast. The house, one of the first International houses to be built in the eastern United States, was written up in 1933 in House Beautiful.

== See also ==
- National Register of Historic Places listings in Southbridge, Massachusetts
- National Register of Historic Places listings in Worcester County, Massachusetts
