= Delta Psi (University of Vermont) =

Defunct social fraternity at the University of Vermont, U.S.

- ΔΨ
- Founded: 1850; 176 years ago University of Vermont
- Type: Social
- Affiliation: Independent
- Status: Defunct
- Defunct date: c. 2003
- Scope: Local
- Colors: Old gold Dregs of wine
- Chapters: 1
- Headquarters: Burlington, Vermont; United States

Delta Psi (ΔΨ) was a local fraternity at the University of Vermont that was associated with the early history of Delta Upsilon. It was active from 1850 until approximately 2004.

== History ==
=== Founding and affiliation with Delta Upsilon ===
John Ellsworth Goodrich

Members of Delta Psi in 1916

Delta Psi was founded at the University of Vermont in 1850 by John Ellsworth Goodrich and eight other freshmen classics students. It was the third fraternity organized at Vermont, after Lambda Iota and Sigma Phi. The following year, in 1851, Delta Psi joined the Anti-Secret Confederation (A.S.C.) that had been convened by several independent northeastern fraternities. The confederation later changed its name to Delta Upsilon.

The establishment of Delta Psi at Vermont was met with disdain by student newspaper The College Maul, which opined: "The Delta Psi or Anti-Secret Society is as decent an affair as anything born of the Freshman class could be. The extreme verdancy of the members is manifest in that they believe their society has made them seniors at once. They have got out a badge—a seven gabled sort of a pin—and they march downtown arm in arm."

Subsequent issues of the paper included similar denouncements. Nonetheless, Delta Psi's policy of pledging freshmen helped quickly grow the chapter and pressured Lambda Iota and Sigma Phi into opening themselves to underclass students.

Delta Psi severed its connections with the A.S.C. in 1854, three years after it joined. The cause of separation is lost to history with Delta Upsilon's own records recording that the exit of Delta Psi is "from causes unknown to us." A Delta Psi historian later claimed the withdrawal was due to the expenses the fraternity was incurring sending delegates to the meetings of the Anti-Secret Confederation. It has also been speculated that Delta Psi felt local pressure in maintaining the A.S.C.'s militant stance against secret ritual; after separating from the A.S.C. it undertook secret work. Delta Upsilon has maintained that it does not consider members of Delta Psi during the period it was affiliated with the A.S.C. to also be members of Delta Upsilon, the separation being so total that the "action removed all its members from membership in the Delta Upsilon fraternity."

In 1884, the fraternity incorporated “for the purpose of promoting useful knowledge, [and] intellectual, social, and aesthetic culture."

As a local fraternity, Delta Psi experienced substantial growth under the leadership of then student Charles H. Heath, becoming the largest fraternity on campus by the mid-1900s.

=== Chapter house ===
Delta Psi did not become a residential fraternity until 1903 when it acquired its first house with the assistance of its aging founding father, Goodrich, by then a professor of Latin at the university. In 1924, Delta Psi purchased and moved into a new home at 61 Summit Street, continuing to use it until the fraternity's undergraduate organization was shut down.

Delta Psi's new facility was a magnificent Queen Anne structure built in 1892 by Burlington businessman Edward Wells. Each room in the 23,418-square-foot, three-story house was constructed of a different wood; the entry was built in white oak, the dining room in mahogany, and the conservatory in sycamore. During the 83 years of Delta Psi's occupancy of the Wells Mansion, it became famous for the 100-keg Oktoberfest parties the fraternity would host.

=== Collapse ===
By the late 1990s, Delta Psi had started a slide into neglect. In 2003, the undergraduate organization reported only five active members. That year, several members were arrested during what university officials described as a hazing incident in which it was alleged another member was abducted off the street, hogtied, and taken to the chapter house where he was paddled, the incident being reported by the abducted member's girlfriend. Fraternity members disputed the hazing characterization, noting the member was an initiate of the fraternity, not a pledge, and explaining the entire event was a case of tomfoolery. University administrators ultimately issued an indefinite suspension of Delta Psi.

The heating system failed in the house in December 2003, resulting in frozen water pipes. Responding to an alarm, city and fire department inspectors found "standing water, smashed doors and walls, woodwork torn apart, and paths of egress obstructed with debris." The city evicted the fraternity's remaining members, declaring the house uninhabitable. At that time, the university considered Delta Psi to be inactive.

Graduate members of Delta Psi immediately undertook a fundraising campaign to pay for the renovation of the aging house, as well as maintain the unoccupied property until such time as the undergraduate organization could be restored. By 2005 they reported raising $1.2 million from alumni, short of the $2 million needed. In 2005, the house lost its property tax exempt status due to lack of student occupancy. The fraternity appealed the tax ruling in court, and won. However, the city appealed that decision to the Vermont Supreme Court which reversed the decision of the lower court in May 2008. Part of the ruling said, "In this case, it is uncontroverted that for three years Delta Psi did not use its residential property to house students—nor could it have legally done so. Their empty, dilapidated building does not confer any public benefit, or justify any public subsidy."

In 2007, the Delta Psi chapter house was purchased by the University of Vermont for $1.2 million and renovated at a cost of more than $10 million to become an event space, and the home of the UVM Alumni Association.

In the 150 years since Delta Psi and Delta Upsilon separated, the latter fraternity avoided attempts to colonize the University of Vermont. In 2014, ten years after the collapse of Delta Psi, Delta Upsilon entered the Burlington campus for the first time since its split with Delta Psi, chartering a colony. The new group was installed as an active chapter in 2018.

== Notable members ==
- Jedediah Hyde Baxter – Surgeon General of the United States Army
- John Dewey – philosopher and psychologist
- Seneca Haselton – justice of the Supreme Court of Vermont
- Charles H. Heath – president of the Vermont State Senate
- Abel E. Leavenworth – educator
- George Powers – justice of the Supreme Court of Vermont
- H. Henry Powers – member of the US House of Representatives

== See also ==
- List of social fraternities
