= Milfoil =

Milfoil is a common name for several plants and may refer to:

- The flowering terrestrial plant Achillea millefolium (known commonly as yarrow)
  - Various species of the genus Achillea (yarrows or milfoils)
- The aquatic plants in the genus Myriophyllum (commonly referred to as water milfoil and other variations including the word milfoil)
