= Chittenden County Superior Courthouse =

- U.S. Post Office and Custom House
- U.S. National Register of Historic Places
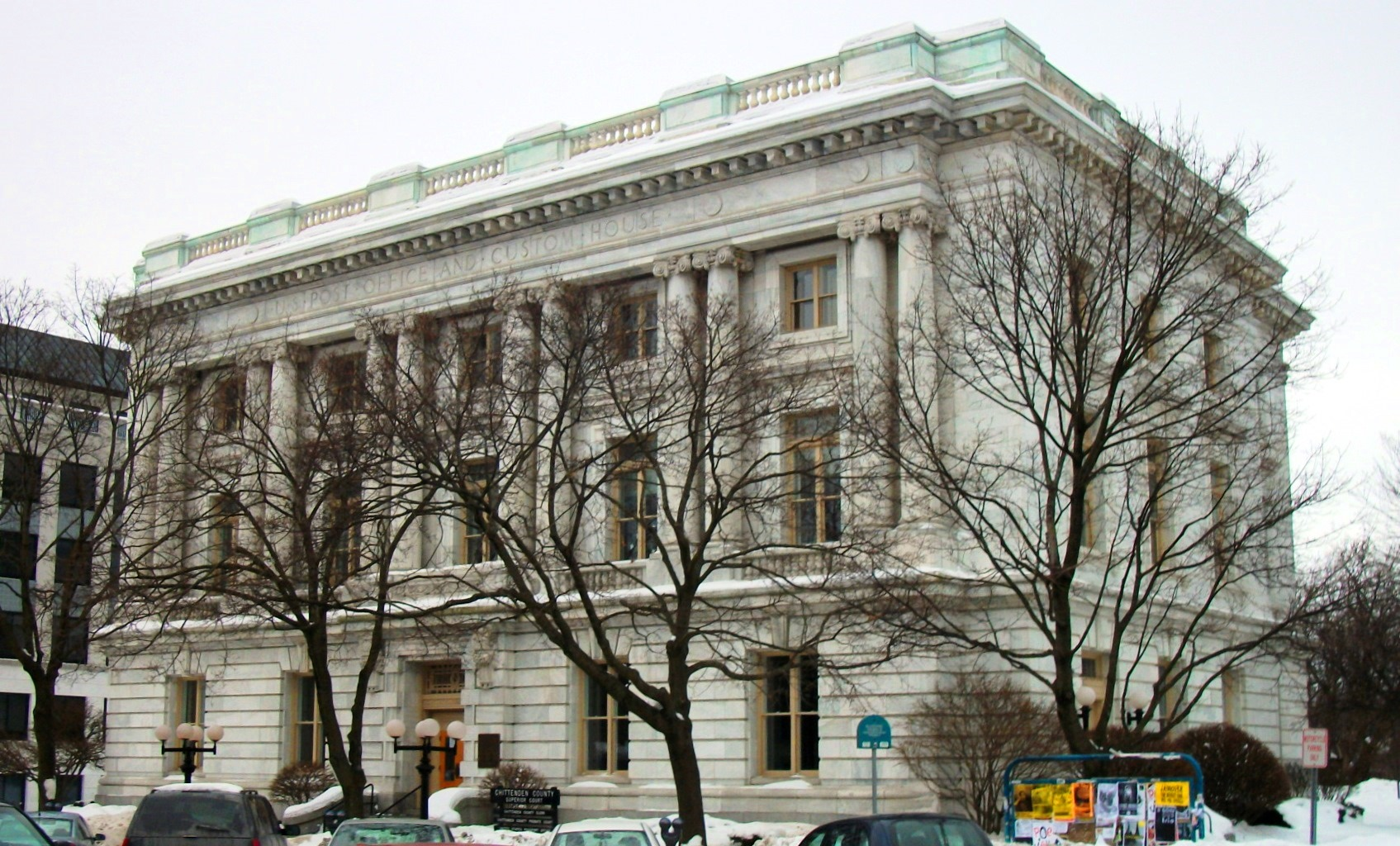
- 2011 photo

- Location within Vermont Location within the United States
- Interactive map showing the location for Chittenden County Superior Courthouse
- Location: 175 Main Street; Burlington, Vermont
- Coordinates: 44°28′33″N 73°12′44″W
- Built: 1906
- Architect: James Knox Taylor
- Architectural style: Beaux-Arts
- NRHP reference No.: 72000114
- Added to NRHP: November 21, 1972

The Chittenden County Superior Courthouse, formerly the U.S. Post Office and Custom House, is a historic government building at 175 Main Street in downtown Burlington, Vermont, United States. It was built in 1906 and was designed by James Knox Taylor in the Beaux-Arts style. Known in the 1970s as the Smith-Goldberg U.S. Army Reserve Center, it served historically as a custom house and post office. It currently houses the Chittenden County Superior Court, after the previous county courthouse burned down in 1982.

== Description and history ==
The Chittenden County Superior Courthouse stands in downtown Burlington, at the southeast corner of Church and Main Streets. It is a large three-story masonry structure, its exterior finished in marble and dressed granite. The principal facade faces Main Street, and is five bays wide. The ground floor appears as a basement level, with large blocks of marble in horizontal bands and stylized arching over the window openings. The second and third floors, which are in a U shape opening to the south, have windows (tall on the second floor, short on the third) articulated by paired Ionic columns. The building is crowned by an entablature, dentillated cornice, and low balustrade.

The federal government built this facility in 1906, which is one of the state's finest examples of Beaux-Arts architecture. Until 1972 it served as a post office, custom house and federal courthouse. From 1963 until 1972 as the Smith-Goldberg Army Reserve Center) and remained in the Federal inventory. In 1972 The Treasury Department declared the building surplus, and it was acquired by in 1974 by Chittenden County. It presently houses the Chittenden County Superior Court and other judicial functions.

== Gallery ==
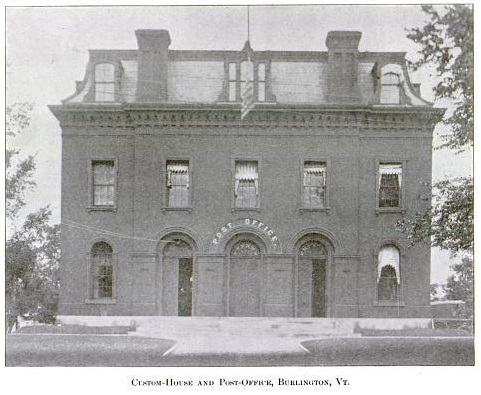
The previous U. S. Custom House, front on Church Street, Burlington, Vermont (1901)

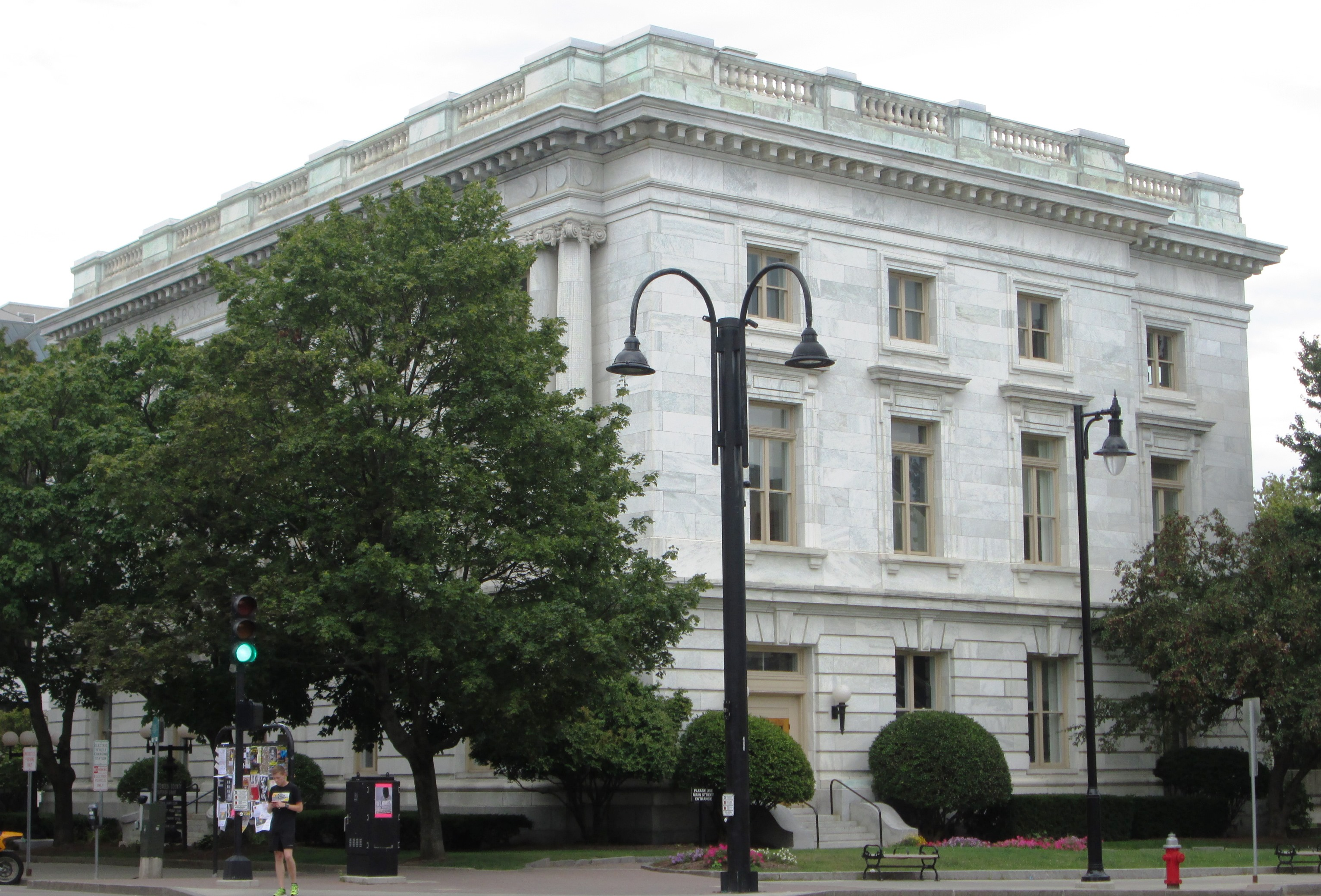
The western facade in 2013

== See also ==
- National Register of Historic Places listings in Chittenden County, Vermont
