= List of art video games =

Gameplay of We Become What We Behold (2016)

This is a list of video games that critics, designers, or scholars have called "art games" or "arthouse games".

Art games differ from mainstream titles in their goals. Where most games aim at fun or challenge, art games treat the medium as personal expression, social commentary, or pure experiment. Some art games reject standard mechanics, while others use familiar genres in unfamiliar ways, or toward unfamiliar ends.

== 20th century ==
- Alien Garden (1982, Bernie DeKoven/Jaron Lanier, Atari 8-bit/C64) – Described by its creators as video game art, The game ranks among the very earliest examples of the art game.
- Warpitout (1982, Jane Veeder, arcade) – An interactive art project programmed in Zgrass for SIGGRAPH '82. The game is housed in an arcade cabinet, and was described by the artist as an "artistic video game". It has been exhibited at the Ontario Science Center.
- Lifespan (1983, Flyghts of Fancie, Atari 8-bit/C64) – A surrealistic pastiche of five episodes leading the player through events representative of the human experience from childhood to death.
- LORNA (1983, Lynn Hershman Leeson, Laserdisc) – An interactive movie where players use a remote control to determine the outcome of the eponymous Lorna's life.
- Moondust (1983, Jaron Lanier, C64) – A video game that is generally considered the first art game, it has been used as an art installation in numerous museums including the 1983 "ARTCade" exhibit at Corcoran Gallery of Art.
- Deep Contact (1984, Lynn Hershman Leeson, Laserdisc) – An interactive movie about the relationship between intimacy and technology in which players interact with a female character's body parts via a touch screen that changes the story based on the body part that is touched.
- Deus Ex Machina (1985, Mel Croucher, ZX Spectrum/C64/MSX) – Based on "The Seven Ages of Man" from the Shakespeare play, As You Like It, this game charts the life of a defect as it evolves within the machine from inception, through growth, and eventually death.
- Le Louvre: The Palace & Its Paintings (1995, Montparnasse Multimedia, PC) – An exploration game focusing on interactive play through the art collection from the Louvre.
- Trigger Happy (1998, Thompson and Craighead, PC/web) – A deconstruction of Michel Foucault's "What is an Author?", this retro-styled art game pays homage to Space Invaders. As the text of Foucault's essay filters in from the top, the player "deconstructs" it by shooting the words which in turn are hyperlinked to Yahoo search inquiries on the linked word.
- LSD: Dream Emulator (1998, Osamu Sato, Asmik Ace Entertainment, PS1) – A surrealist and contemporary art game. The player freely explores psychedelic, dreamlike environments without any objectives.
- Font Asteroids (1999, Esc to Begin, PC/web) – A wry commentary on information overflow on the internet where users select information itself as the enemy. Presented as an homage to Asteroids, all textual content from a URL of the player's choice is used to take the place of rocks and break apart into prefixes, suffixes, and roots.
- SOD (1999, Jodi, PC) – An aesthetic art game hinting at private emotion by deconstructing Wolfenstein 3D, turning it into a Kafka-esque series of abstract black, white, and grey images where it is difficult to determine what to shoot.
- The Intruder (1999, Natalie Bookchin, PC) – Low-art elevated to "high art" in a retro setting. An experimental adaptation of Jorge Luis Borges' 1966 short story "La intrusa", where two brothers fall in love with the same woman and decide to kill her to resolve their conflict. In the game, players must compete for the female in a Pong setting and then act out aggressive behavior in a first-person shooter setting to progress. The piece invites gamers to see how popular games perpetuate masculine ideologies of spatial conquest, combat fantasies, and sexual domination.
- Vib-Ribbon (1999, Masaya Matsuura, PS1) – A music game starring a wireframe bunny.
- Lullaby for a Dead Fly (2000, Mouchette, PC) – A player clicks on flies to kill them. Each click is a life-or-death choice. The musical background is Mouchette's song, "You Clicked on me, you killed me."
- Pencil Whipped (2000, Lonnie Flickinger, PC) – A first-person shooter where all textures are made to look like pencil drawings on paper, and all sound effects were produced by the artist.
- Sissyfight (2000, GameLab, PC/web) – An illustration of ruthless social climbing, this multiplayer game allows users to fire off words instead of bullets. Set in a California playground setting, female player characters use teases to drive other players out of the playground.

== 21st century ==
=== 2001–2005 ===
- a maze@getty.edu (2001, Tiffany Holmes, PC) – Commissioned by the J. Paul Getty Research Institute, the game is a combined maze and Breakout-based commentary on the power and prevalence of high-tech surveillance technology in modern life that uses surveillance images as bricks in a Breakout setting.
- Go Fish (2001, John Klima, PC) – A first-person shooter in which victory releases a real-life goldfish into a pool of others and a loss releases the fish into a pool with the carnivorous Oscar. The game is intended to highlight and question the banality of the fact that in the game, the player is making what are presented in-universe as conscious decisions to end a life.
- Painstation (2001, //////////fur////, arcade) – A 2-player Pong-based game where scoring by either player subjects both to electrical shocks, whips, or burning. The game is intended to demonstrate the physical consequences of in-game acts.
- Rez (2001, Tetsuya Mizuguchi, PS2) – A music game designed to create the effects of synesthesia for the player. The game was inspired by the artistry of Wassily Kandinsky and has been displayed in art exhibits including the 2002 "Game On", the Smithsonian's 2012 "The Art of Video Games", and the 2012 "Game Masters".
- Invaders! (2002, Douglas Edric Stanley, PC) – A political art game referring to the September 11 attacks.
- Pac-Mondrian (2002, Prize Budget For Boys, PC) – A game that merges Pac-Man with the works of Piet Mondrian.
- Q4U (2002, Feng Mengbo, PC) – A Quake mod based on Roland Barthes' "Death of the Author" where the player hunts cloned copies of Mengbo himself. The player also holds a plasma gun and a video camera (intended to illustrate that both devices are used "to shoot subjects as quarry").
- Tropical America (2002, OnRamp Arts, PC) – A collaborative bilingual art game with black and white woodcut graphics. The game explores the El Mozote massacre.
- Vagamundo (2002, Ricardo Miranda Zuñiga, mobile arcade) – Based on Donkey Kong, this mobile game focuses on the plight of the Mexican immigrant.
- [domestic] (2003, Mary Flanagan, PC) – A simulation of the author's childhood memory of escaping from a burning building.
- 911 Survivor (2003, Mike Caloud/Jeff Cole/John Brennon/Aaron Kwon, PC) – A simulation of the suicide of a civilian trapped in the burning World Trade Center towers.
- Escape From Woomera (2003, Escape from Woomera Collective, PC) – A political art game addressing issues and implications of Australian detention centers, particularly the Woomera Immigration Reception and Processing Centre. The game is based on the Half-Life engine.
- Graf War (2003, Andrew Waer/Joe Callahan/Eric Cho/Sky Frostenson, PC) – A Half-Life mod set in a California subway system where the goal is to spray paint as much of the map as possible without being located by the police, who use lethal force to stop the player.
- Left to my Own Devices (2003, Geoffrey Thomas, PC) – A personal narrative about loss loosely based on Elisabeth Kübler-Ross' five stages of grieving.
- Samorost (2003, Amanita Design, PC) – A video game that employs organic and wooden materials in its presentation.
- Mudcraft (2004, Brian Winn/Jason Tye, PC) – A nonviolent real-time strategy game based on creatures made of mud.
- Neon (2004, Jeff Minter, Xbox 360) – A music visualization program.
- Waco Resurrection: C-Level (2004, Eddo Stern, PC) – A 3D game dealing with the Waco Texas Massacre and the Branch Davidian leader David Koresh. In the game players take the role of Koresh as they attempt to defend the compound from government agents and from other, rival Koreshes.
- Cloud (2005, USC Game Innovation Lab, USC Interactive Media & Games Division, PC) – Highly acclaimed student art game created as a research project in the USC Game Innovation Lab to explore emotional gameplay.
- Electroplankton (2005, Toshio Iwai, Nintendo DS) – A free-form music game considered to be the first art game for the Nintendo DS.
- Façade (2005, Michael Mateas/Andrew Stern, PC/Mac) – An artificial intelligence-based interactive novel making use of natural language processing.
- Killer7 (2005, Capcom, GameCube, PlayStation 2) – A surreal horror neo-noir on rails action adventure game with a cell shaded art style. The game's story deals with themes of political extremism and the division of western and eastern cultures.
- mono (2005, Binary Zoo, PC) – A paint-based multidirectional shooter.
- Samorost 2 (2005, Amanita Design, PC) – The sequel to Samorost, this adventure game also employs organic backdrops.
- Super Columbine Massacre RPG! (2005, Danny Ledonne, PC) – A video game exploring the Columbine High School massacre whose exclusion from Slamdance '07 led to a partial boycott of the event for anti-censorship reasons by numerous high-profile indie developers.
- The Endless Forest (2005, Tale of Tales, PC) – Originally commissioned for an art exhibition, this game is an Massively Multiplayer Online game in the broader sense of the word. As stags, players roam around the forest and interact—though not by words, but by sounds and body language. Players are recognizable by their unique symbol and customized appearance, but are otherwise anonymous.
- Soviet Unterzoegersdorf: Sector 1 – A point-and-click adventure game by art group monochrom

=== 2006–2010 ===
- Airport Insecurity (2006, Ian Bogost/Persuasive Games, PC) – A game arguing that American airport security policy has little to do with security.
- Armadillo Run (2006, Peter Stock, PC) – A transportation puzzle game making use of everyday objects.
- Calderoids (2006, Prize Budget For Boys, PC) – A space shooter that merges Asteroids and the work of Alexander Calder by replacing the titular asteroids with Calder's kinetic mobiles.
- flOw (2006, thatgamecompany, PC) – A spare action game based on life as observed through a microscope lens. The game has been displayed in art exhibits including the 2010 "Game (Life): Video Games in Contemporary Art" exhibit at The Firehouse Gallery.
- Line Rider (2006, Boštjan Čadež, PC) – A puzzle game in which the player can draw the track for the character.
- LocoRoco (2006, Tsutomu Kouno, PSP) – A tilt-based platform game.
- Ōkami (2006, Clover Studio, PS2, Wii) – a video game created in the sumi-e style.
- Toribash (2006, Hampa Söderström, PC/Wii) – A third-person turn-based tactical martial arts simulator using physics-based attacks.
- game, game, game and again game (2007, Jason Nelson, PC) – A Flash-based absurdist game, one of the first to combine poetry with art in a game interface.
- The Marriage (2006, Rod Humble, PC) – An abstract expression of the artist's idea of "how a marriage feels," using colored shapes that the player can manipulate with a mouse.
- The Night Journey (2007, Bill Viola, Tracy Fullerton, USC Game Innovation Lab, PC) – A meditative exploration of the spiritual journey in the form of a video game. Funded by a grant from the National Endowment for the Arts, this project is a collaboration between a major media artist (Bill Viola) and a game designer (Tracy Fullerton).
- Torrent Raiders (2007, Aaron Meyers/Corey Jackson, PC) – A space shooter in which the real-time game elements reflect the activities of a real-world bit torrent swarm. The game's setting is the ad-hoc networks created by bittorrent users.
- Aether (2008, Edmund McMillen/Tyler Glaiel, PC) – A video game that employs a unique visual style and atmosphere.
- Akrasia (2008, GAMBIT, PC) – A game tackling the issue of inner demons related to addiction.
- Between (2008, Jason Rohrer, PC) – A game about consciousness and isolation. Winner of the 2009 IGF Nuovo Award.
- Braid (2008, Jonathan Blow, Xbox 360/PC/PS3/Mac) – A video game that enables the player to "rewind" the game at will. Designed as a deconstruction of classic video games. The game has been displayed in art exhibits including the 2010 "Game (Life): Video Games in Contemporary Art" exhibit at The Firehouse Gallery, and the 2012 "Game Masters".
- BrainPipe (2008, Rich Carlson, Iikka Keränen, PC, Mac, iPhone) – Brainpipe is a 1st person game of spatial navigation, hypnotic graphics and strange, deeply immersive sound effects – Brainpipe earned the IGF 2009 award for Innovation in Audio. In 2010, the Australian Centre for the Moving Image in Melbourne presented Brainpipe playable on its outdoor wall screen (Federation Square).
- Camera (2008, Yareyare, PC) – A desktop simulator where the real-life player's actions with a mouse causes the in-game player's hand to move correspondingly.
- Coil (2008, Edmund McMillen/Florian Himsl, PC) – An instructionless autobiographical game presenting two parallel stories with an emphasis on exploration.
- Glum Buster (2008, CosMind, PC) – An action adventure game on the topic of daydreams.
- Gravity Bone (2008, Blendo Games, PC) – A cinematic spy game featuring cubical characters. Winner of the GameTunnel Best Arthouse Game 2008 award.
- I Wish I Were the Moon (2008, Daniel Benmergui, PC) – A love story between a boy and girl where the player must manipulate the background until all endings have been unlocked.
- LittleBigPlanet (2008, Media Molecule, PS3) – Puzzle-platform game based on user-generated content.
- Nom 3 (2008, Bong Koo Shin, cellphone) – A simple puzzle game exploring the concept of post-Valentine's Day loneliness.
- Soviet Unterzoegersdorf: Sector 2 – A point-and-click adventure game by art group monochrom
- Passage (2008, Jason Rohrer, PC/Mac) – A meditation on death. The game has been displayed in art exhibits including the 2010 "Game (Life): Video Games in Contemporary Art" exhibit at The Firehouse Gallery, and the Museum of Modern Art in March 2013.
  - Gravitation (2008, Jason Rohrer, PC/Mac) – A spiritual sequel to Passage, this game expresses the artist's conflict between work and fatherhood. The game has been displayed in art exhibits including the 2010 "Game (Life): Video Games in Contemporary Art" exhibit at The Firehouse Gallery.
  - Life is a Race! (2008, cactus, PC) – A one-button satire of Jason Rohrer's Passage.
- Randy Balma: Municipal Abortionist (2008, Mark Essen, PC) – A raw and oversaturated dissection of the concept of abortion taking the form of four disjointed but thematically linked minigames.
- Seven Minutes (2008, Virtanen Games, PC) – A platform game with only seven minutes to play.
- Tension a.k.a. The Void. (2008, Ice-Pick Lodge, PC) – A Russian adventure game.
- The Eggyard (2008, Yxxa Zu/Monochrome, PC) – A mashup using Custer's Revenge as the basis and Dizzy from the eponymous series as the hero.
- The Graveyard (2008, Tale of Tales, PC) – A simple but highly artistically detailed game about an old woman visiting a graveyard. This was first game to be funded by the Flanders Audiovisual Fund.
- The Night of Bush Capturing: A Virtual Jihadi (2008, Wafaa Bilal, PC) – A political art-piece.
- WTF?! (2008, Robert Nideffer/Alex Szeto, PC) – An RPG-style response to Blizzard's 2004 World of Warcraft.
- You Have To Fertilize the Egg (2008, Kianis, PC) – A sequel to Kianis' earlier game, You Have to Burn the Rope.
- And Yet It Moves (2009, Broken Rules, PC/Wii) – A single-player puzzle platform game set in a paper-themed world. Resembling a paper collage, background elements and characters consist of ripped paper, and the nameless player character appears as a cutout pencil line-drawing on white paper.
- Blueberry Garden (2009, Erik Svedäng, PC) – 2D puzzle platform game. Winner of the Seumas McNally Grand Prize at the 2009 Independent Games Festival.
- Don't Look Back (2009, Terry Cavanagh, PC) – A retro-styled platform game presenting a modern interpretation of the Greek legend of Orpheus and Eurydice.
- Earth (2009, Alexis Andre, PC) – A Space Invaders-themed game with a message.
- Eggregor8 (2009, Antonin Fourneau/Manuel Braun, NES) – An exploration of the "combined spirit", this 8-player collaborative version of Pac-Man requires all players to provide simultaneous input into Pac-Man's movement on the game screen.
- Every Day The Same Dream (2009, Molleindustria, PC) – An existential game that addresses the topics of labor and alienation.
- One Chance (2010, Dean Moynihan, PC) – A puzzle game with multiple outcomes that can only be played once.
- Evidence of Everything Exploding (2009, Jason Nelson, PC) – A platform poetry game.
- Flower (2009, thatgamecompany (TGC), PS3) – Game designed to arouse emotions to the gamer and does not follow normal gameplay. The game has been displayed in art exhibits including the 2010 "Game (Life): Video Games in Contemporary Art" exhibit at The Firehouse Gallery, the Smithsonian's 2012 The Art of Video Games, and the 2012 Game Masters.
- Flywrench (2009, Mark Essen, PC) – A vector-based game that was shown as an exhibit in New York's New Museum.
- Judith (2009, Terry Cavanagh/Stephen Lavelle, PC) – A low-res retelling of Béla Bartók's opera, Bluebeard's Castle, with an emphasis on control.
- Lose/Lose (2009, Zach Gage, PC) – A space shooter where enemies are linked to actual files on the player's computer. Killing an enemy results in the deletion of the associated real-world file.
- Sidequest: Text Adventure(2009, The Guardians of Tradition, PC) – An examination of the text adventure genre.
- The Path (2009, Tale of Tales, PC) – An experimental game in which the player uses different characters to unfold the narrative in a "Little Red Riding Hood"-inspired environment.
- Today I Die (2009, Daniel Benmergui, PC/iPhone/iPad) – A somber puzzle game in which players must choose from a selection of words to change lines from a poem, and their choices affect the scene and ending.
- Cart Life (2010, Richard Hofmeier, arcade) – A gray-scale game depicting the trials and tribulations of four street vendors in a town modeled after the artist's hometown of Eugene, Oregon.
- Limbo (2010, Playdead, PC/Xbox 360/PS3) – Puzzle-platform game using film noir-like monochrome visuals and subtle ambient environment sounds as the player guides a boy through a dark and scary forest to find his missing sister. The game has been displayed in art exhibits including the Smithsonian's 2012 "The Art of Video Games".
- Nidhogg (2010, Messhof, PC) – a two-player fencing game. Winner of the 2011 IGF Nuovo Award.
- Norrland (2010, Jonatan Söderström AKA Cactus, PC) – An exploration of life in Sweden.
- Recurse (2010, Matt Parker, PC) – An action game commissioned by the NYU Game Center for its "No Quarter" art game exhibition. The player in this game becomes the cursor and the exhibition room becomes the playing field, causing the player to move about in the real world to control the game.
- Sleep Is Death (2010, Jason Rohrer, PC/Mac) – An adventure creation game requiring the creator to be present to respond to the players' actions in near real-time.
- Sunshine (2010, Kyle Gabler, PC) – A game where the player guides a flower's growth toward the sky while avoiding falling rocks and humans (who can be turned into flowers).
- Thomas Was Alone (2010, Mike Bithell, PC, PS3) – A platform game composed entirely of geometric shapes, overlaid with narration.

=== 2011–2015 ===
- iCarus (2011, Sir Realism, iOS) – A textless game in which the player takes the role of a grieving father as he draws in his sketchbook to advance the plot.
- Ruins (2011, Cardboard Computer, PC) – A dream-like conversation-based game centering on animal rights with a dog as the hero.
- Scrape Scraperteeth (2011, Jason Nelson, PC) – A game intended to serve as an introduction to art games.
- Superbrothers: Sword & Sworcery EP (2011, Capybara Games, iOS/PC/Mac/Android) – An independent game prioritising experience over gameplay. The game has been displayed in art exhibits including the 2012 "Game Masters".
- Swashbuckel Ur Seatbelts (2011, Famicom, Xbox Live Arcade) – A surreal pop culture mashup involving pirates.
- Sweat Life (2011, Brian Handy, PC) – A minimalist game on the topic of the difficult life of the sweatshop worker.
- Ulitsa Dimitrova (2011, Lea Schönfelder, PC) – An exploration of homelessness and poverty in Russia. Set in St. Petersburg, the player must spend all of his time obtaining vodka and glue to be traded for cigarettes.
- Art Game (2012, Pippin Barr, web) – A browser-based flash game about an artist making art for a show at the Museum of Modern Art.
- Bientôt l'Été (2012, Tale of Tales, PC) – An art game based on the work of Marguerite Duras and other French literature.
- Dear Esther (2012, thechineseroom, PC/Mac) – An "interactive book" that consists entirely of walking around a virtual island while listening to narration.
- Journey (2012, thatgamecompany, PS3) – A game of exploration which includes an online component, allowing a player to experience the game with another, otherwise unidentified, player, considered to be an "interactive work of art". The game has been displayed in art exhibits including the 2012 "Game Masters".
- Papo & Yo (2012, Minority, PS3, PC) – A puzzle-platform game about a child, abused by his drunk father, who escapes to a surreal landscape; the game serves as an allegory for the abusive childhood that Vander Caballero, the game designer, had gone through himself.
- The Unfinished Swan (2012, Giant Sparrow, PS3) – A surreal adventure game in which a young boy wanders through a colorless picture book dreamscape following a swan. As he does so, color is gradually introduced to the game.
- Proteus (2013, Ed Key, PC) – A first-person exploration of an uninhabited island.
- Antichamber (formerly Hazard: The Journey of Life) (2013, Alexander Bruce, PC) – A first-person puzzle-platform game exploring non-Euclidean geometry.
- Gone Home (2013, The Fullbright Company, PC/Mac/Linux) – An interactive story about a girl returning from travel abroad to an empty house, discovering troubles within her family in the process.
- Kentucky Route Zero (2013, Cardboard Computer, PC) – A point and click adventure game without puzzles or challenges, and with the main focus on storytelling and atmosphere.
- Moirai (2013, Chris Johnson, PC) – An experimental online adventure game that involves the player to make judgments and decisions around a moral dilemma, revealed as a real-world interaction with other players who have made the same decisions.
- Papers, Please (2013, Lucas Pope, PC/Mac) – The player takes the role of a checkpoint officer in a fictional Soviet Bloc country, verifying passport information, but as the game develops it forces the player to make moral and ethical choices between his family and their welfare, and those immigrants attempting to pass through.
- Problem Attic (2013, Liz Ryerson, PC) – Issues of disempowerment, gender roles, and personal trauma analysed through 2D platform game mechanics.
- Mountain (2015, David OReilly, PC/Mac/Linux) The game ask you to draw answers to personal questions then uses that input to generate a model of a mountain. At this point, the game lacks significant interactivity and the mountain changes on its own.
- Ennuigi (2015, browser game, PC) – The game relates the story of Luigi's inability to come to terms with the lack of narrative in the original Super Mario Bros. as well as add metafictional commentary.
- Sonic Dreams Collection (2015, PC/Mac) – A game by Arcane Kids that mocks the Sonic the Hedgehog series' fandom, which is known for its peculiarities, such as Eggman's theories, erotic fanart, fan fictions, fan-made OCs, etc.

=== 2016 onwards ===
- Islands: Non-Places (2016, Carl Burton, PC, Mac, Linux, IOS) – A series of vignettes of abstractly presented liminal spaces that become more surreal as the player interacts with them.
- That Dragon, Cancer (2016, Ryan & Amy Green/Josh Larson, Ouya, PC) – An adventure game dealing with a family coping with the discovery that their four-year-old son has inoperable cancer, reflecting on developer Ryan Green's own experiences in dealing with his young son's terminal brain cancer.
- The Tomorrow Children (2016, Q-Games/Sony, PlayStation 4 Network) – Combines full control over a sculptable environment on the one hand, with the complete lack of control as an individual in a Marxist collective setting. Surrealist transformation of beings into environment by replacing animation with movement of light.
- We Become What We Behold (2016, Nicky Case, PC/Mac) – A free 5-minute game, centered around photographing and reporting on interesting individuals, which in turn affect other individuals. This mechanic is used to illustrate the effect of journalism on public perception, and how this effect compounds through further exposure.
- Everything (2017, David OReilly, PC, PlayStation 4) – A game that allows the player to move and control any object they see in the game world, developed in an attempt to explore the philosophy of English philosopher Alan Watts.
- 13 minutes ago (2017, Alain Xalabarde, Android) – A free interactive fiction that recreates the moments previous to a terrorist attack by Spanish group ETA, which can be played from the perspective of the perpetrators and the victims. Google retired the game in Spain and, as of September 2017, the game could only be installed from Google Play accounts located outside of Spain.
- Walden, a game (2017, Tracy Fullerton, USC Game Innovation Lab, PC/Mac/PS4) – A game that translates the experiment in living conducted by American philosopher Henry David Thoreau into a playable experience. Introspective game mechanics encourage players to find a balance between fulfilling basic survival needs and seeking inspiration in the virtual landscape.
- The Path of Motus (2018, Michael Hicks and Gonçalo Antunes, PlayStation 4, Xbox One, PC) – A game about bullying where words have the power to destroy.
- Bound (2016, Santa Monica Studios, PS4, PSVR) A dancing platform game with art video elements, reflecting the story of the main character's childhood memories.
- Gorogoa (2017, Jason Roberts, PS4, Xbox One, PC, Nintendo Switch, iOS) – A puzzle story presented with four images in a grid in which the player arrange, combine, and explore each image to find a connection between them in order to advance the story. The creator of Gorogoa drew by hand all the scenes; he cites David Roberts, Gustave Doré, Christopher Manson, and Chris Ware as influences to his art style.
- Outer Wilds (2019, Mobius Digital, PC/Xbox/PS4/Switch) – A mystery exploration game where there are no explicit objectives and the story is instead driven by the player's curiosity alone.
- Kid A Mnesia Exhibition (2021, Namethemachine, Arbitrarily Good Productions, Epic Games, PC, Mac, PS5) – A virtual art installation where players freely explore abstract, surreal settings while experiencing Radiohead's music and artwork.
- 1000xRESIST (2024, sunset visitor 斜陽過客, PC/Switch) – A narrative adventure game set in an oppressive future society whose tenets are based on the life events of a teenage girl, including her generational trauma and immigrant experience.
