= John Klima =

John Klima is the name of:

- John Klima (editor) (born 1971), editor of the science fiction magazine Electric Velocipede
- John Klima (artist) (born 1965), American new media artist and professor at Rhode Island School of Design
