= Church Street Marketplace =

Shopping area in Burlington, Vermont

Coordinates: 44.4782°N 73.2127°W

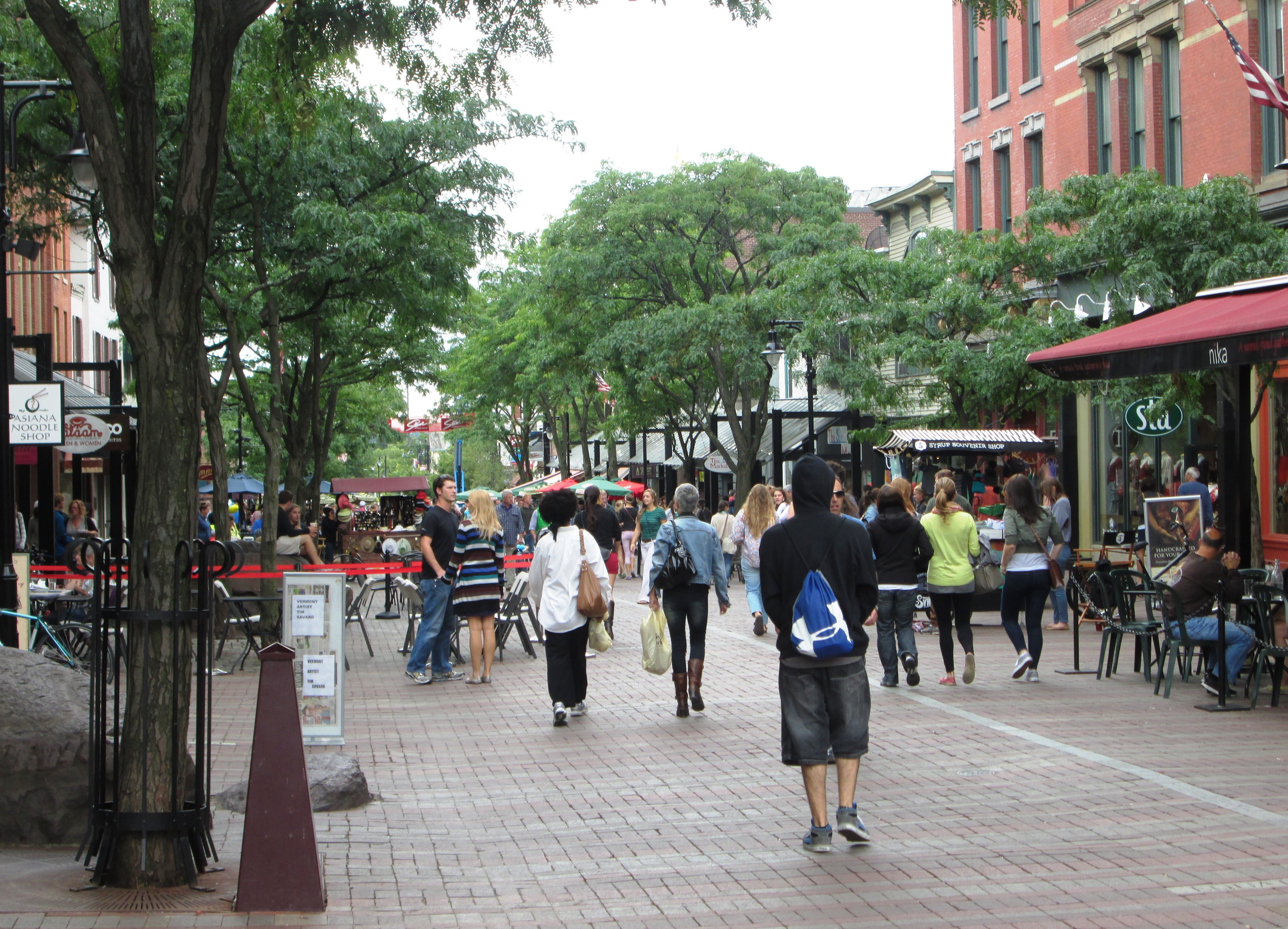
The Church Street Marketplace, looking south from Bank Street in 2013.

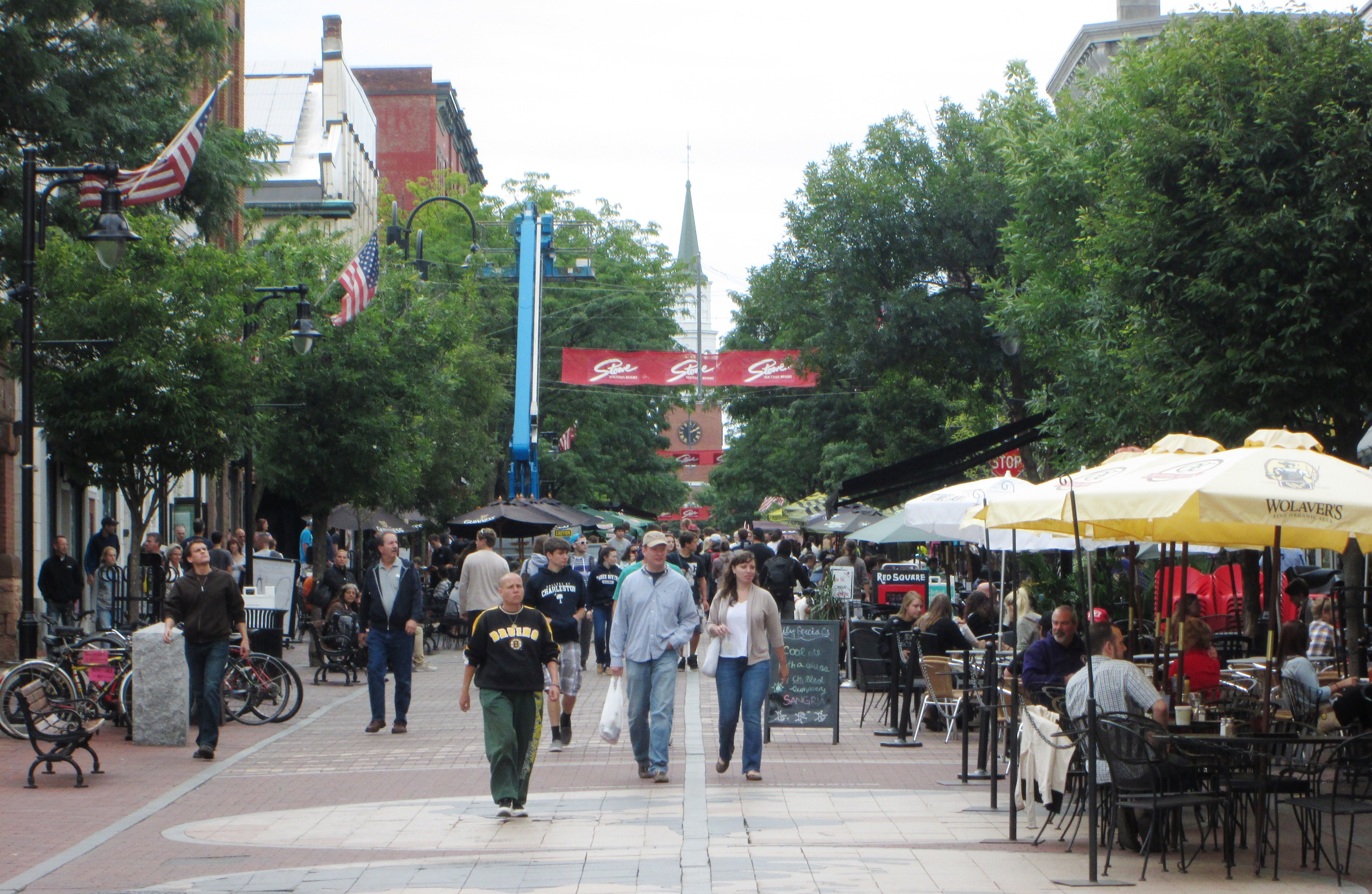
The Church Street Marketplace, looking north from Main Street in 2013.

The Church Street Marketplace is an uncovered outdoor pedestrian shopping and dining mall in Burlington, Vermont, consisting of the four blocks of Church Street between Main and Pearl Streets. The mall was initially conceived in 1958 and was built in 1980–81 to a design by Carr, Lynch Associates of Cambridge, Massachusetts. It encompasses about 86 storefronts and is managed by the Church Street Marketplace Commission.

Major retailers include five national chain stores as well as local retailers of clothing, home-wares, books, and other goods. It is the site of festivals throughout the year. Events such as the South End Art Hop and public galleries such as The Firehouse Gallery provide a forum for the visual arts. The American Planning Association named the Church Street Marketplace one of America's "Great Public Spaces" for 2008. The marketplace is also home to dozens of restaurants, bars, and coffee shops.

== History ==
The concept of the Church Street Marketplace originated as early as 1958 as part of a series of urban renewal discussions. During the summer of 1971, a one-day, experimental street fair was held on four blocks of Church Street, and approximately 15,000 persons attended. The success of the street fair was taken as a demonstration of the feasibility of a mall.

By late 1971, Patrick Robins, president of the Downtown Burlington Development Association and local architect Bill Truex (then chairman of the City's Planning Commission) recognized the potential of the mall. With their guidance, a second, week-long street fair was held along Church Street in the summer of 1972. Traffic was rerouted from four blocks of Church Street to the parallel streets, extra transit was added for the week and short-term physical modifications (such as adding trees, benches, and booths) were made on the street. Merchants were allowed full use of the area for display of retail goods and special events were planned. It was estimated that 50,000 persons attended during the week.

An enclosed shopping mall, Burlington Square (now Burlington Town Center), opened on the Church Street Marketplace in 1976. The mall was anchored by a Macy's department store. In 2014, another flagship, an LL Bean store, opened. On February 2, 2022, it was announced that the mall would close for good.

Five years were spent debating the merits of a variety of mall designs. During the spring and summer of 1977, the Mayor, the Director of City Planning, Chairman of the Steering Committee, and architects traveled to several other cities that had built auto-restricted malls, such as Portland, Minneapolis, and Providence. From these exploratory trips, they decided that the factors most important to the success of a mall included responsibility for operation and maintenance, design on a pedestrian scale, offering community uses along various parts of the mall, and inclusion of a transit system compatible with the mall's design. In August 1977, city officials signed a $304,000 design and architectural contract with the Burlington firm Alexander and Truex to develop the new design for the project.

A design for Church Street was unveiled in March 1978, which encompassed a two-level scheme, with a lower level below the street level, connecting to adjacent buildings through their basements. The lower level would add 80,000 square-feet of retail space to the City's total with no new construction, and provide 20,000 square feet of city-owned retail space. In March 1979, the City sponsored round table discussions and both local citizens and merchants responded negatively to the idea of a two-level mall. The Steering Committee decided to drop the two-level scheme, and a new plan was devised. The new plan included bringing the street level up to the sidewalk level, resurfacing the street with brick, adding canopies and shelters, closing the street to cars on the two central blocks, and implementing the downtown bus loop which would enable buses to cross Church Street at two intersections. The one-level plan was approved by city voters later that year.

C. E. Maguire, Inc., of New Britain, Connecticut, was hired to supervise the architectural/engineering work. That firm assumed all engineering tasks and contracted Carr & Lynch Associates of New York City as architects. Design work was based on a final design scheme by Alexander and Truex: a one-level street mall with replacement and/or improvement of utilities underground, resurfacing of the street, and improvements and appointments along the surface. The new $6 million design scheme was approved in early 1980 and construction began on July 7.

During the sixteen months of construction, none of the businesses along Church Street changed locations or terminated business and retail sales in the area showed no decline. Construction was completed in the fall of 1981.

== Occupancy rates ==
From the completion of the Marketplace through the year 2010, retail occupancy had remained above 90% and had held steady even in the midst of the Great Recession. In September 2010, it had 91.7% occupancy with 7 ground-floor vacancies. 90% is more typical. The vacancy rate peaked at 11% in December 2009.

== Historic districts ==
The mall is largely co-extensive with the Church Street Historic District, which was listed on the National Register of Historic Places in 2010, however several of the buildings located on Church Street – including City Hall, Ethan Allen Engine Company No. 4, the Chittenden County Trust Company Building (#123), and the McAuliffe Building (#117) – are part of the City Hall Park Historic District. Two other buildings on Church Street, the Masonic Temple (#1) and Richardson Place (#2), as well as the Unitarian Church on Pearl St. are part of the Head of Church Street Historic District, which was listed in 1974. In addition, the Montgomery Ward Building (#52-54) is separately listed on the NRHP.

A selection of historic buildings in the District and the Marketplace

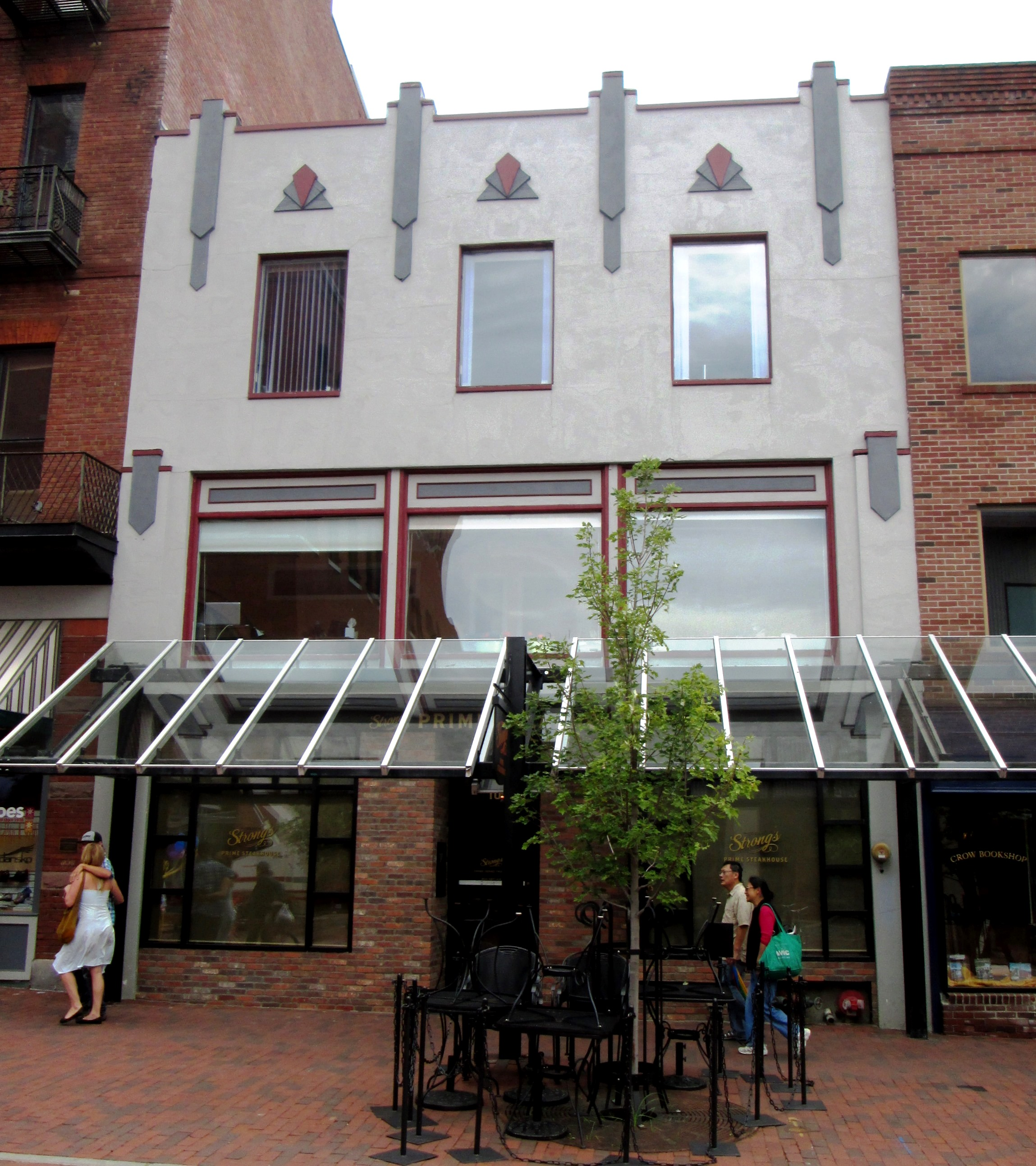
10 Church Street, one of the few Art Deco buildings in Burlington
(1877, facade: 1936)

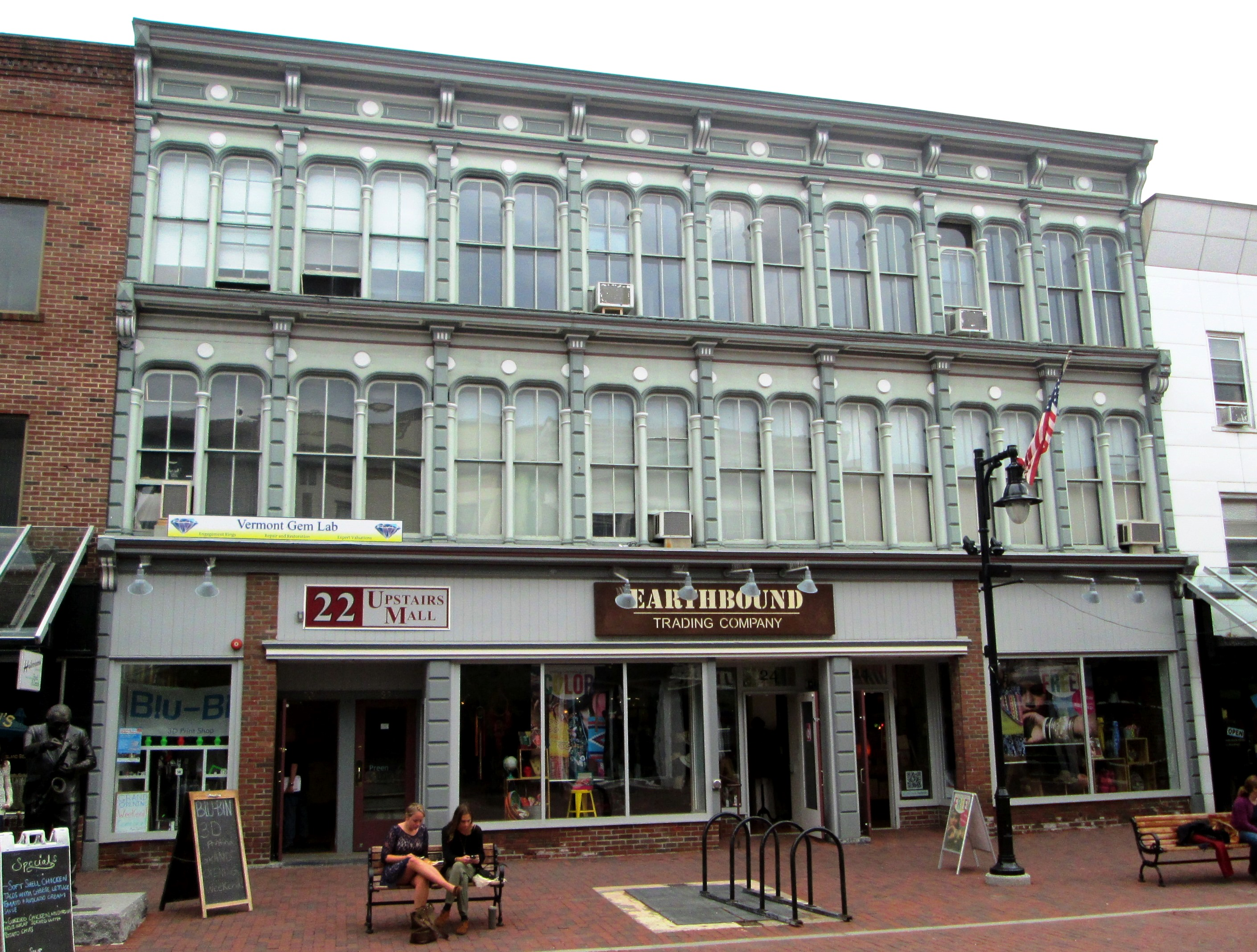
20-26 Church Street, in the Italianate style
(1874)

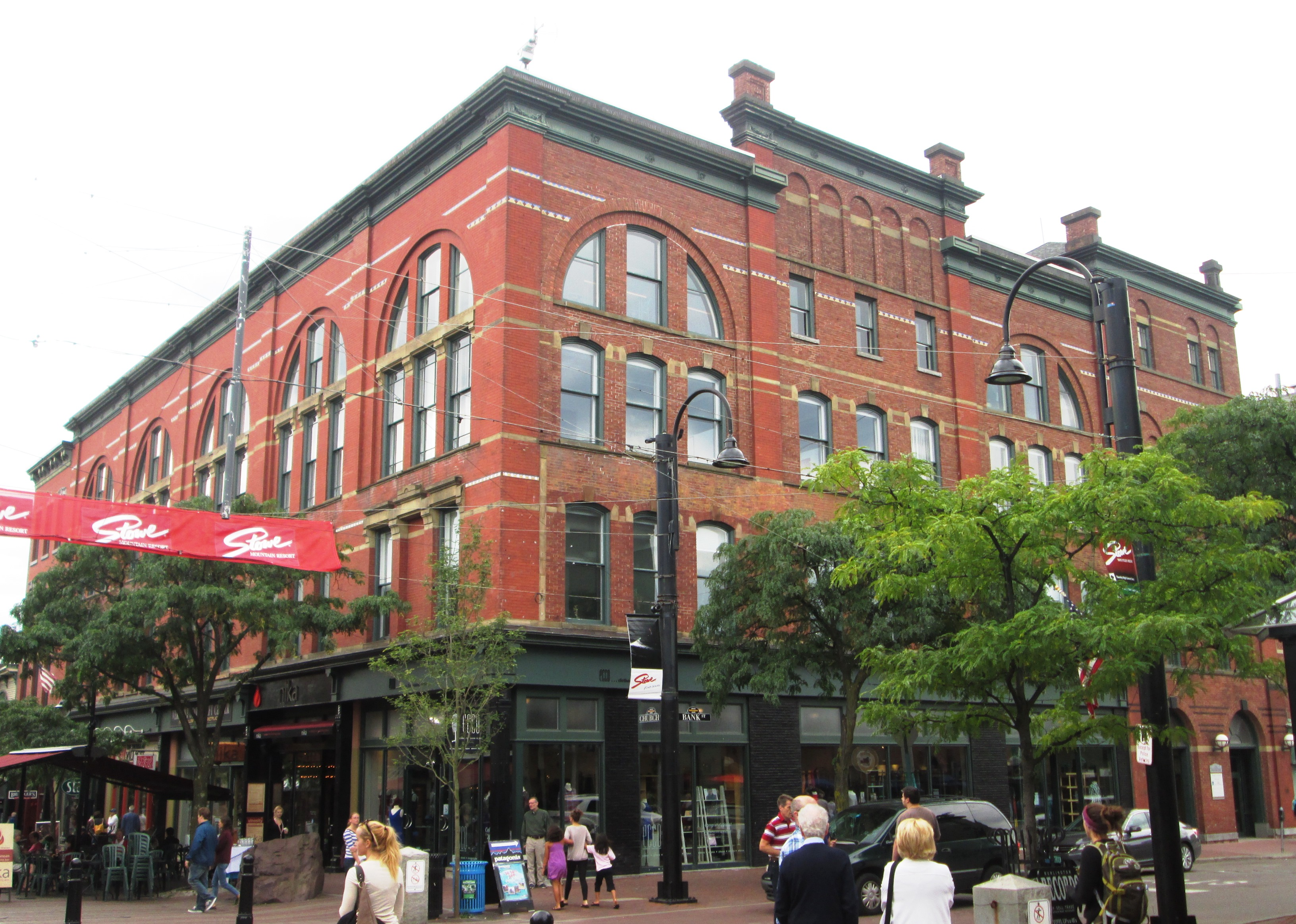
81-91 Church Street, formerly the Howard Opera House
(1874)

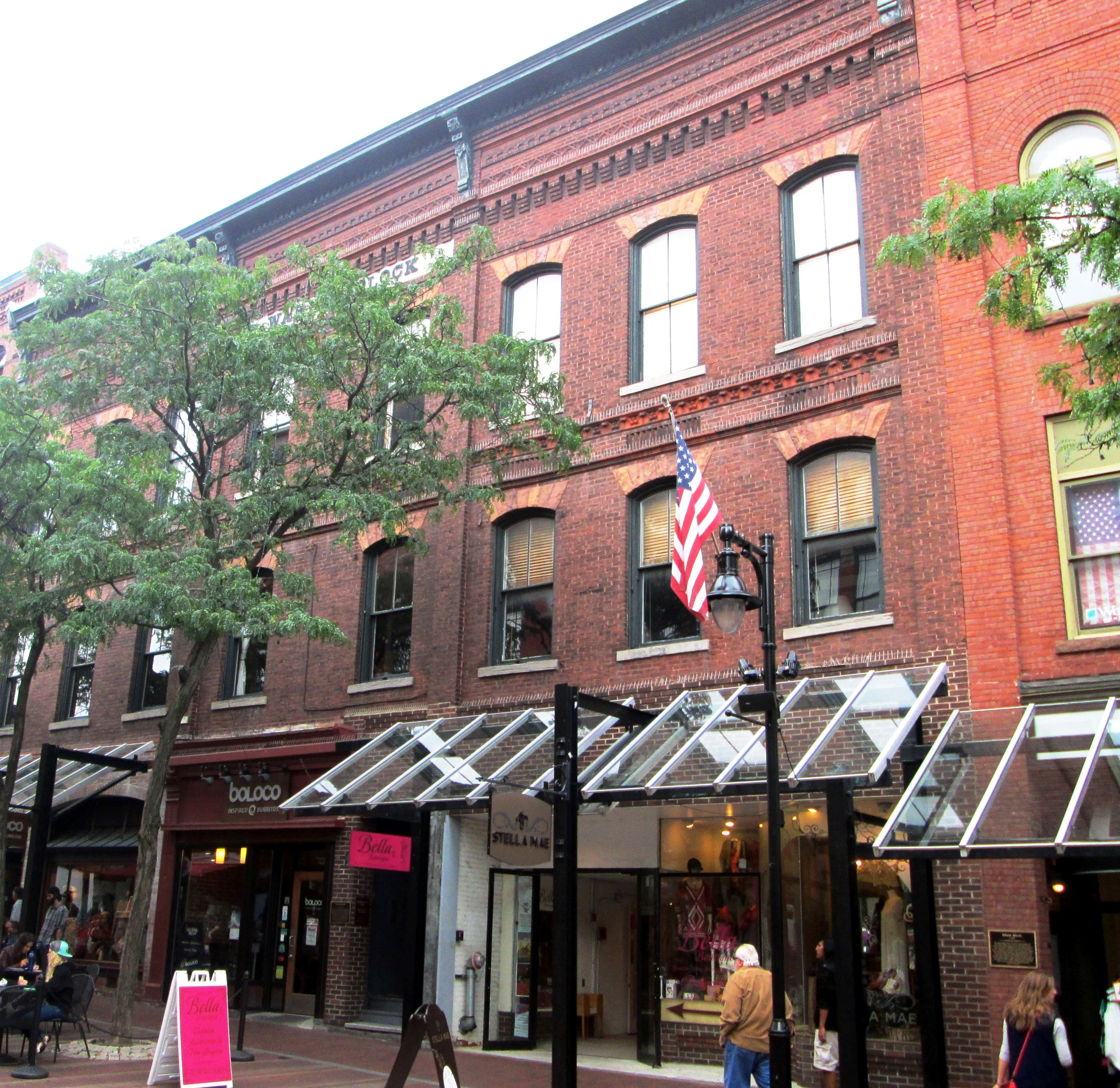
90-98 Church Street, the Warner Block, in the Queen Anne style
(1886)

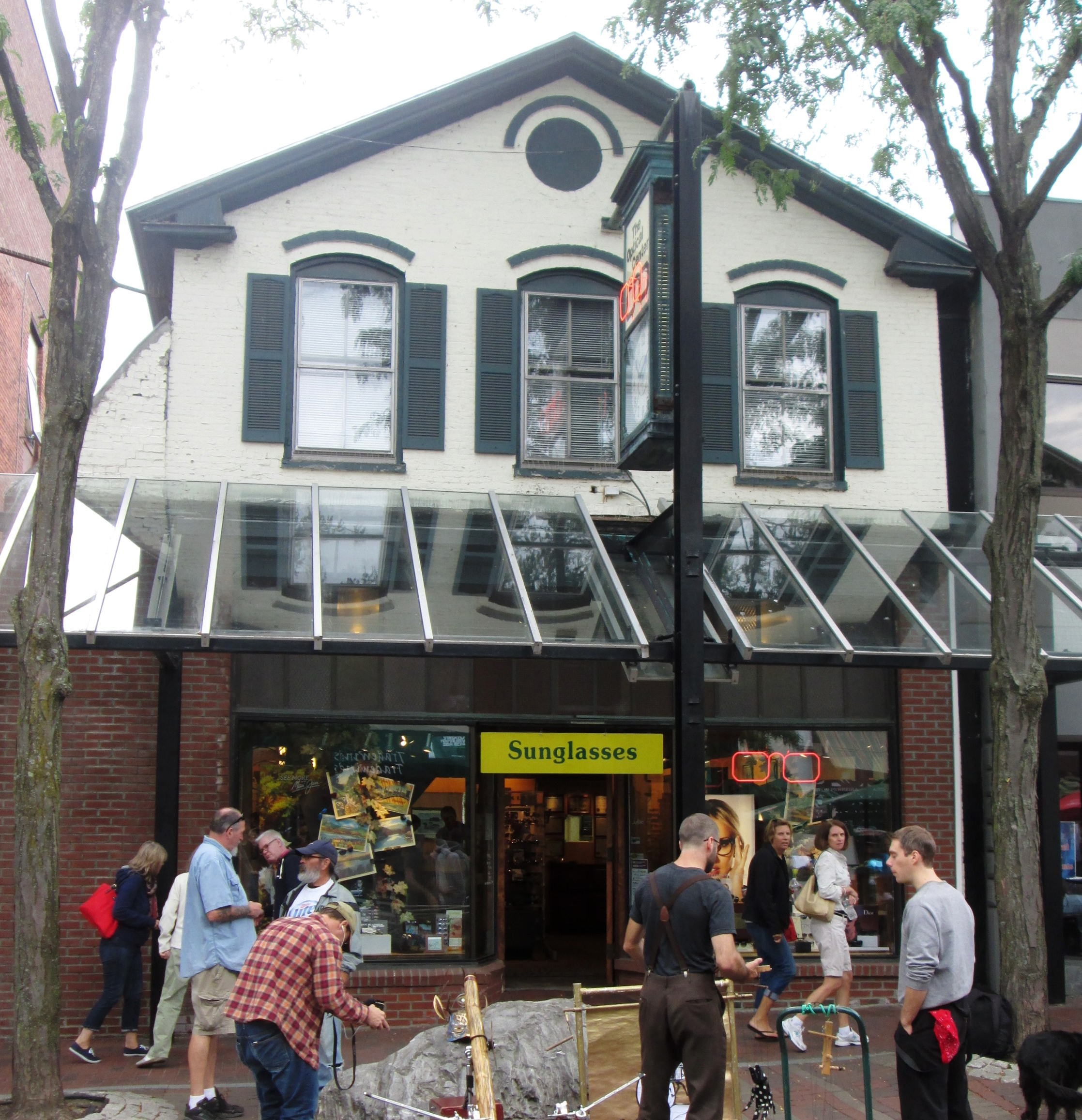
107 Church Street, one of the oldest buildings in the district
(c. 1822)

== See also ==
- National Register of Historic Places listings in Chittenden County, Vermont
