= Jason Nelson =

Jason Nelson may refer to:

- Jason Nelson (poet)
- Jason Nelson (musician)
- Jason Nelson (politician)
