= Ethan Allen Engine Company No. 4 =

- Ethan Allen Engine company No. 4
- U.S. National Register of Historic Places
- U.S. Historic district – Contributing property
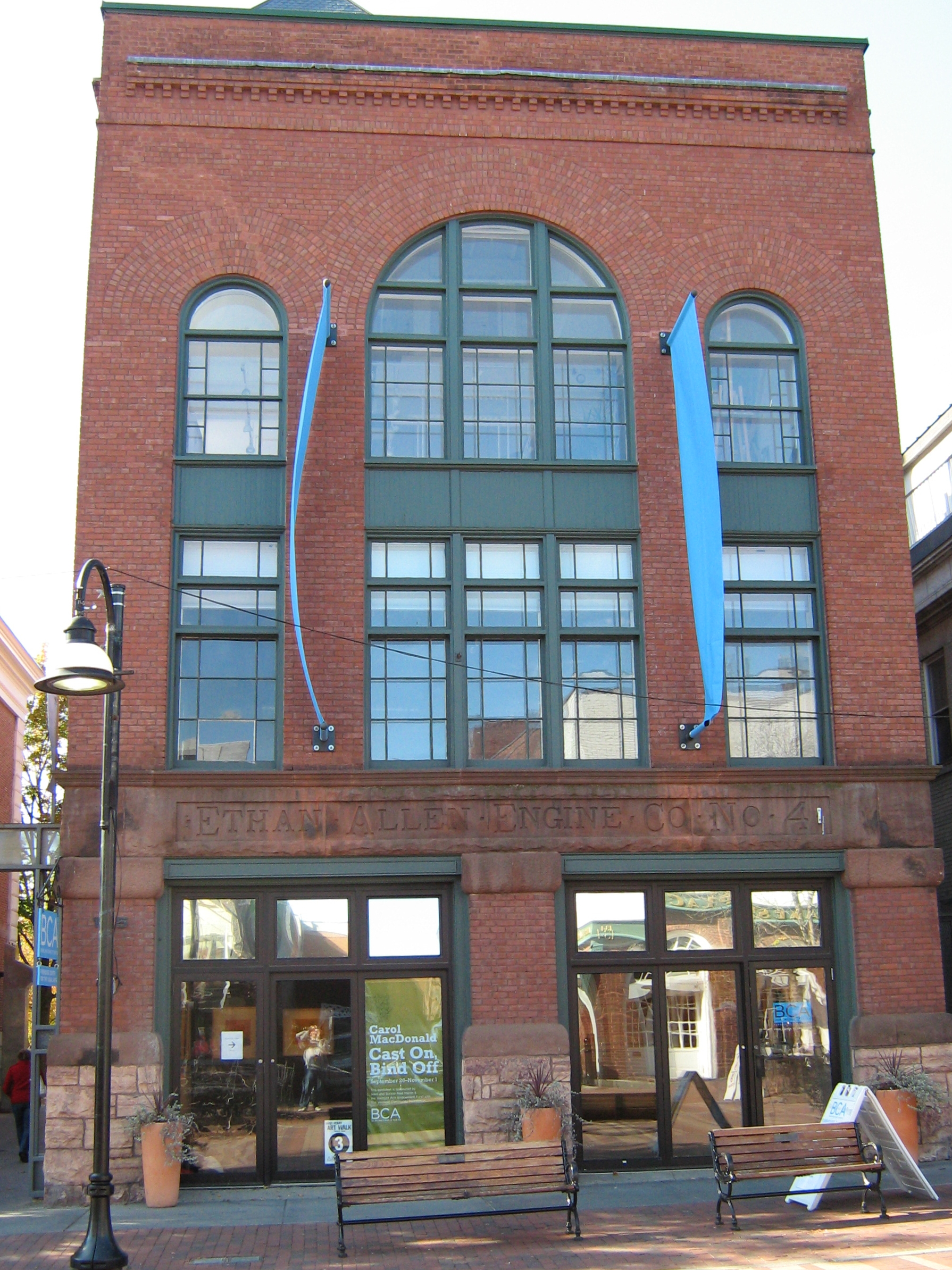

- Location within Vermont Location within the United States
- Location: Church St., Burlington, Vermont
- Coordinates: 44°28′40″N 73°12′50″W
- Area: less than one acre
- Built: 1887
- Architect: Fisher, A. B.
- Part of: City Hall Park Historic District (ID83003206)
- NRHP reference No.: 71000056

Significant dates
- Added to NRHP: April 16, 1971
- Designated CP: June 9, 1983

The Ethan Allen Engine Company No. 4 is a historic former fire and police station at 135 Church Street in Burlington, Vermont, United States. Built in 1887 for a private fire company, it is a fine local example of 19th-century commercial architecture. It served the city as a fire and police station until the 1960s, and is now used as a commercial space. It was listed on the National Register of Historic Places in 1971, and is a contributing property to the City Hall Park Historic District.

== Description and history ==
The former Ethan Allen Engine Company No. 4 building is located just north of Burlington City Hall, on the west side of Church Street between Main and College Streets. Its front facade faces Church Street, but it also presents a designed facade to City Hall Park, which is located directly behind it. It is three stories in height, built out of red brick, in a commercial variation of the Richardsonian Romanesque style. The facade facing Church Street has two former equipment bays on the ground floor, now converted to commercial storefronts, which art articulated by pilaster-like brick pillars set on granite block piers with red rusticated stone base and capital. A stone band above these bays identifies the engine company. The upper two floors have windows set in groups in tall round-arch openings, which are in a Palladian style with a large central opening and narrower flanking ones. The building is topped by an 85-foot (26 m) tower that was originally used to dry hoses.

The firehouse was built in 1887 for a private fire company that operated horse-drawn fire engines. It was later folded into the city's fire department, and the building adapted to house motorized fire equipment. Later in the 20th century it was occupied by the Burlington Police Department, which vacated the premises in the late 1960s. It has since been adapted for commercial uses.

== See also ==
- National Register of Historic Places listings in Chittenden County, Vermont
