= Montgomery Ward Building (Burlington, Vermont) =

- Burlington Montgomery Ward Building
- U.S. National Register of Historic Places
- U.S. Historic district – Contributing property
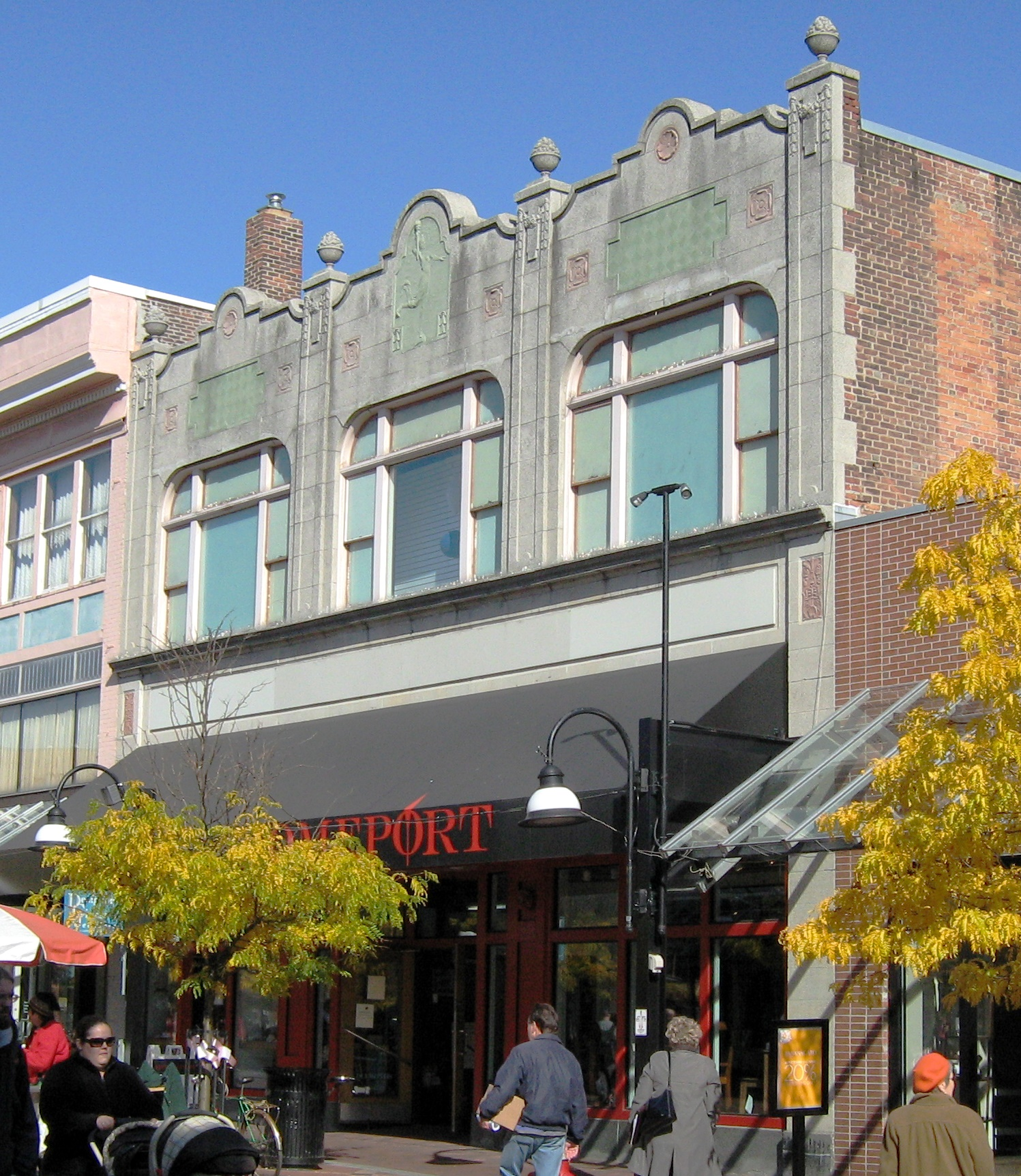
- 2008 photo

- Location within Vermont Location within the United States
- Location: 52-54 Church St. Burlington, Vermont
- Coordinates: 44°28′44″N 73°12′46″W
- Built: 1929
- Part of: Church Street Historic District (ID09000915)
- MPS: https://npgallery.nps.gov/NRHP/GetAsset/NRHP/91000673_text
- NRHP reference No.: 91000673

Significant dates
- Added to NRHP: May 30, 1991
- Designated CP: July 29, 2010

The Burlington Montgomery Ward Building is a historic former department store building located at 52-54 Church Street, between Cherry and Bank Streets, in the Church Street Marketplace of downtown Burlington, Vermont. Erected in 1929, it is a fine example of Classical Revival architecture, and is the best-preserved of the small number of original Montgomery Ward stores built by that retailer in the state. It was listed on the National Register of Historic Places in 1991.

== Description and history ==
Burlington's former Montgomery Ward building stands on the east side of the pedestrian mall of Church Street, roughly midway between Cherry and Bank Streets. It is a two-story masonry building, three bays wide, with an exterior facade of concrete and brick. The ground floor consists of modern storefronts finished mainly in brick, while the second-story facade is faced in concrete that is finished in imitation of stone. Each bay has a Chicago-style three-part window with rounded upper corners, and is topped by a terra-cotta panel. The central bay's panel displays Montgomery Ward's "Spirit of Progress" emblem, designed for the company by J. Massey Rhind, and which adorns many of the company's stores built at the time. The bays are articulated by concrete pilasters topped by urns, and have low parapets with neo-Classical motifs at the top.

The building was opened on December 28, 1929, and was the 515th Montgomery Ward store in the United States, part of the company's strategy to open many small stores to compete with the smaller number of large stores that were being opened by its competitor, Sears, Roebuck & Company. The company continued to operate the store in Burlington until December 1961, when it was closed. Since then, a number of retailers have utilized the building, part of which has been partitioned off to become a bank branch.

== See also ==
- National Register of Historic Places listings in Chittenden County, Vermont
