= Islands: Non-Places =

2016 art game

- Developer: Carl Burton
- Publisher: Carl Burton
- Engine: Unity
- Platforms: iOS; Linux; macOS; Windows
- Release: November 17, 2016
- Genre: Art game
- Mode: Single-player

Islands: Non-Places is a 2016 abstract art game developed and published independently by artist and animator Carl Burton, who is best known for the animated GIF illustrations he created for season two of the Serial podcast. The game was released on November 17, 2016, on iOS, Linux, macOS, and Windows, and consists of a series of anonymous, liminal environments – the eponymous "non-places". These scenes appear mundane at first, but become increasingly surreal as the player interacts with the objects within.

Each place is rendered in the stylized manner that characterizes Burton's work, with solid monotone colors, dark shadows, and foggy backgrounds. The gameplay is minimal and consists mainly of clicking on the environment and observing what unfolds, a design choice that Burton hoped would engender a sense of slight confusion in the player without overwhelming them with difficult puzzles. In developing Islands, Burton drew inspiration from diverse sources, including the work of anthropologist Marc Augé, the installation art of James Turrell, and the field recordings of Chris Watson.

Critical response was generally positive, and the game was nominated for the Nuovo Award at the 2016 Independent Games Festival. Much of the positive reception focused on the abstract visuals and sound design; on the other hand, some critics were disappointed with the limited scope of the gameplay. Although divided on the precise message the game expresses, many critics described Islands as leaving them with a feeling of renewed wonder at mundane things in the real world.

== Gameplay ==
In this excerpt from one of the game's vignettes, a procession of palm trees ascends an escalator toward a landing. The lights on the landing indicate an opportunity for the player to interact with the scene.

Islands: Non-Places consists of a series of ten scenes, each of which represents an anonymous, nondescript environment such as a parking lot, hotel lobby, or airport. These spaces are rendered in the stylized manner that characterizes Burton's work, with solid monotone colors, dark shadows, and foggy backgrounds, and although each scene clearly represents a constructed space, they are devoid of any human presence. The overall effect is intended to invoke the feeling of each area being a liminal place or "non-place". (Note: Liminal spaces are often defined as being interchangeable spaces which serve primarily as a transition between destinations, and which may feel uncanny or strange as a result.) The seemingly mundane environments become increasingly surreal as the player interacts with the scenery. In one scene, an empty bus stop becomes an incubator for eggs; in another, a malfunctioning fountain opens up to reveal a vast underground space beneath it.

The gameplay is minimalist; the camera can be rotated around the scene in a fixed circle, but the player cannot move within it. The only means of interaction is clicking on the environment to prompt the next step of the scene to unfold; once it has played out in its entirety, the game transitions to the next scene. Interactive areas are usually – but not always – noticeably lit up. There are no puzzles to be solved, and no overarching narrative or goal aside from interacting with the current scene. The game is short, and can be completed in less than an hour. Because of its minimal interactivity and emphasis on visuals, it is usually described by critics as an art game.

== Development ==
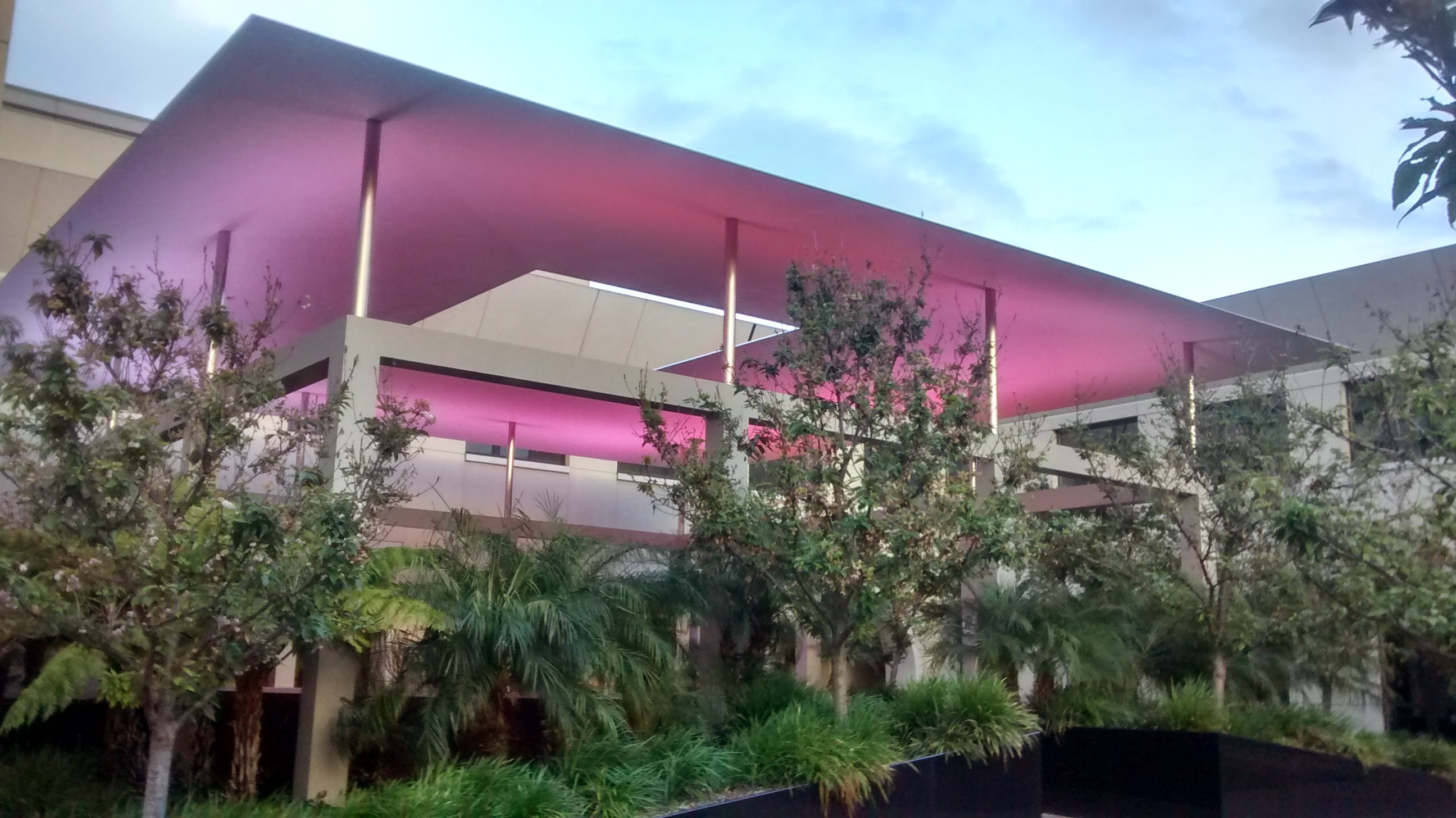
Dividing the Light (2007), an outdoor skyspace art installation at Pomona College by James Turrell; photo taken at dusk

The game was developed and published independently by artist and animator Carl Burton, best known for the animated GIF illustrations he created for season two of the Serial podcast. Islands was released on November 17, 2016, on Windows, macOS, iOS, and Linux. Burton estimated that the game had taken six to eight months to develop, using Unity Playmaker and Cinema 4D. Burton described wanting to expand on his animations to allow interaction. He stated that although it is never made explicit in the game, "what you see happening is something that might happen every day in the world of the game. The 'surreal' behavior is mundane from the point of view of the world itself."

In creating the game, Burton was inspired in part by the book Non-Places: An Introduction to Supermodernity (1995), in which French anthropologist Marc Augé coined the term "non-place" to refer to places such as hotel rooms, parking lots, and airports, which are ubiquitous in the modern urban landscape, but feel anonymous and interchangeable. With Islands, Burton sought to explore the strangeness of these mundane environments in a way that was accessible to anyone, so he built the game without challenging game mechanics. In an interview, he explained, "I'm not really interested in puzzles as difficult obstacles. I wanted a more light and realistic sense of momentary confusion, like when you're staying at a friend's house and have to figure out how their shower works."

The installation art of James Turrell, who works with color and light in large built spaces, was an inspiration for the neon palette and haziness of Islands. Discussing the game's palette, Burton said that the colors chosen for each scene were "intuitive" to him, with some being literal ("like a dark purple for night") and others being more abstract, suggesting environmental factors like temperature.

The soundtrack was inspired by field recordings made by experimental musician Chris Watson, and mainly consists of assorted artificial sound effects and ambient environmental sounds such as distant cars or birdsong, which are not always obviously connected with the visuals of a scene. All of the sounds in the game are pre-existing, freely licensed recordings which Burton found on the internet.

== Reception ==
Critical reception for Islands was generally positive, and the game was nominated for the Nuovo Award at the 2016 Independent Games Festival. Reviewers gave particular attention to the uncanny, dreamlike atmosphere created by the abstract visuals and ambient soundtrack. The visuals were similar to Burton's previous animated work, with Rob Funnell at TouchArcade noting that the game felt to him like a logical follow-up. Some found the game mesmerizing or hypnotic, while others found it eerie or haunting. Andy Kelly of PC Gamer described Islands as reminiscent of the "nonsensical micro-dreams you have when you’re trying to stay awake while jet-lagged." Similarly, Philippa Warr of Rock Paper Shotgun described the game's transformations as "more of a gentle dreamtime absurdity." An anonymous reviewer at Japanese indie magazine The Massage found that playing the game felt like being "lost in a movie scene," and noted a similarity to the work of American director David Lynch.

Some individual scenes stood out as particularly memorable to reviewers. Warr described one vignette which features a series of potted plants on an escalator, and wrote that seeing "a palm tree masquerading as a serious shopper" made her smile. For Simon Parkin at Eurogamer, the most notable was a vignette that depicts the nighttime routine of an unseen person in a home. He felt the scene had a sense of loneliness and menace, which reminded him of "the jarring asynchronicity of modern life; the cloistered way in which we live in cities, so close, so apart."

Islands drew comparisons to other minimalist art games, such as Flower (2009) by Thatgamecompany, Monument Valley (2014) by Ustwo, and Mountain (2014) by artist David OReilly. Jesse Singal at The Boston Globe compared it favorably to the classic adventure game Myst (1993), finding it less frustrating. Many reviewers felt the minimal gameplay made the game feel less like a traditional video game and more like a piece of interactive art, although there was uncertainty about Burton's intended meaning, or even if there was one. Warr speculated that the game represented "what the objects themselves might be dreaming." Several critics felt that the game left them thinking about the hidden beauty or wonder within mundane things, both within the game and in the real world after playing. Chris Priestman at Kill Screen wrote "the game lures you into seeing these pedestrian spaces as a kind of secret machine ... like a car made for James Bond that has taillights that flip to reveal missile launchers."

Campbell Bird at 148Apps scored the gameplay and replay value poorly, but found it interesting as a one-off experience. Allison Meier of Hyperallergic found that the limited gameplay eventually became repetitive, but was impressed overall by the unexpected way each scene unfolded. Both Joshua Wise of Twinfinite and Rob Rich of Gamezebo expressed some frustration with the interaction mechanics, which they noted did not always clearly indicate where to click next. Rich's review was critical of the game as a whole, finding that the environmental fog detracted from the intriguing visuals, and the minimalist tapping-based gameplay was unsatisfying. Parkin's review dismissed those criticisms as "obvious [and] uninteresting," and argued that the lack of traditional gameplay in Islands was what made it appealing.

== Legacy ==
Burton announced his follow-up game, Mirria, at Day of the Devs 2025. It will be published by Mografi Games.

== See also ==
- List of art games
- Video games as an art form
