= Wells-Richardson Complex =

- U.S. National Register of Historic Places
- U.S. Historic district
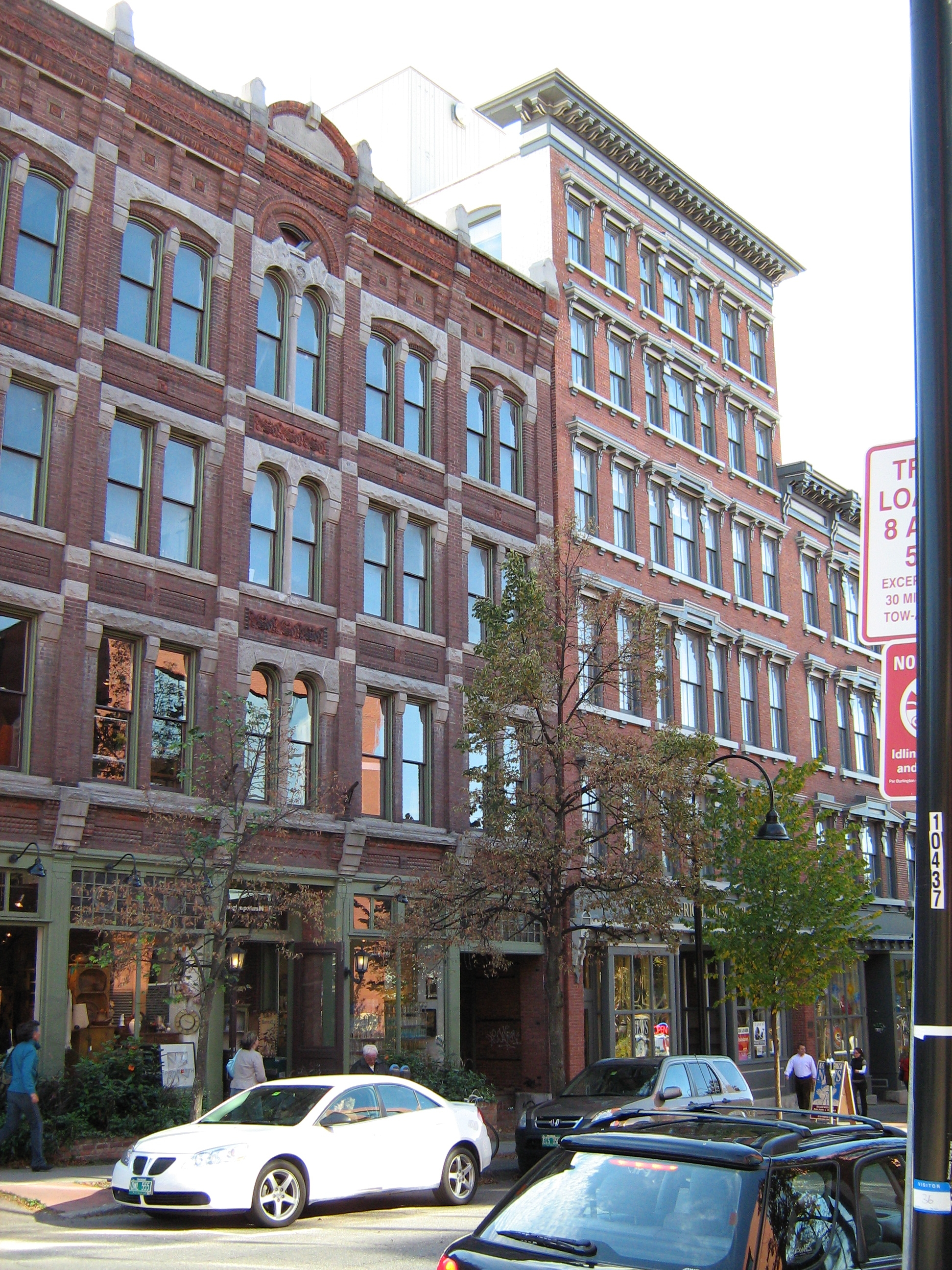

- Location within Vermont Location within the United States
- Location: Main, Pine, College, and St. Paul Sts., Burlington, Vermont
- Coordinates: 44°28′35″N 73°12′54″W
- Area: 4 acres (1.6 ha)
- Built: 1820
- Architectural style: Early Commercial, Renaissance, Italianate
- NRHP reference No.: 79000221
- Added to NRHP: March 5, 1979

The Wells-Richardson Complex is a historic commercial-industrial area in downtown Burlington, Vermont. Bounded by Main, Pine, College, and St. Paul Streets just west of City Hall Park, the architecture on this one city block represents nearly a century's worth of development. It is dominated by the former plant of the Wells-Richardson Company, a highly successful maker of patent medicines in the late 19th century. The district was listed on the National Register of Historic Places in 1979.

== Description and history ==
The city block just west of City Hall Park in Burlington has long been seen as a desirable commercial area. It is located at the former northern terminus of a stagecoach route (now United States Route 7), and is near to the civic center of the city and of Chittenden County, located across St. Paul Street to the south of the park. The oldest surviving building in the block is a brick building at the northern end of the St. Paul Street block, built in the 1820s as a three-story building and renovated and enlarged in 1870 and 1910, when it was part of the Burlington Steam Laundry. Other buildings facing the park across St. Paul Street were built as hotels between 1872 and 1910, and exhibit Colonial Revival and Commercial Italianate style.

The dominant elements of the rest of the city block include five buildings historically associated with the Wells-Richardson Company. Under the direction of General William Wells, this company was highly successful in selling Paine's Celery Compound, a patent medicine which it marketed as far away as Sydney, Australia. The company survived on other products for thirty years after federal legislation in 1906 effectively ended the distribution of patent medicines. Its main manufacturing plant was the brick four-story building occupying the center of the block, and the company also occupied 125 College Street, where it had a retail space, showrooms, and offices. It eventually expanded into other buildings on the block, occupying five in all at its economic height.

== See also ==
- National Register of Historic Places listings in Chittenden County, Vermont
