= Michael Hicks (game designer) =

American video game developer and musician

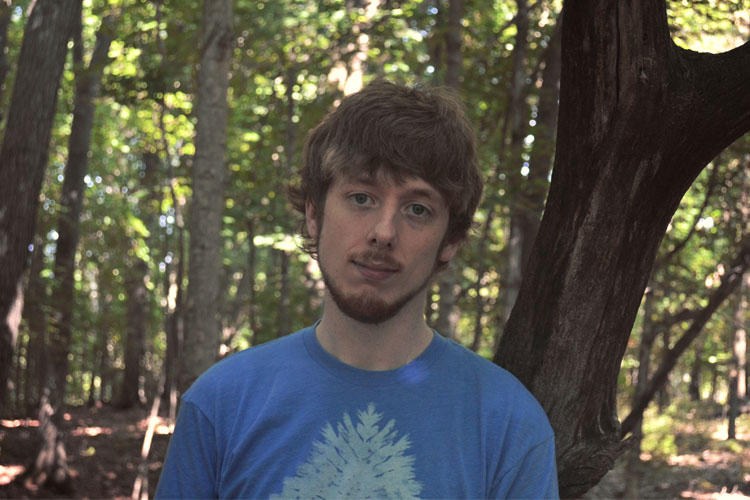
- Michael Hicks (2015)
- Born: January 3, 1993 (age 33); Mt. Vernon, Illinois
- Occupations: Video game designer, musician, programmer, writer
- Known for: The Path of Motus, Pillar

Michael Hicks (born January 3, 1993) is an American game designer, musician, programmer and writer. His most notable works include 2018's The Path of Motus and 2015's Pillar. Described as a "lone auteur", Hicks is noted for his innovative game concepts. His soundtrack work has also been critically acclaimed.

== Early life ==
Hicks grew up in Mt. Vernon, Illinois and attended Mt. Vernon Township High School. Hicks began programming games at 14 and taught himself the skills he needed by studying examples online. While attending High School he released his first published video game onto Xbox Live Indie Games at 18. After High School he moved to Winter Park, Florida to attend Full Sail University.

== Career ==
After releasing his first published game in 2011, Hicks became active in the Xbox Live Indie Games community. He helped coordinate the third Indie Games Uprising in 2012, an event that included his own game Sententia. After this he signed on with Sony and released Pillar for PlayStation 4 in 2015. Pillar was downloaded by over 320,000 players and was showcased at the Game Developer's Conference. He released The Path of Motus on July 17, 2018.

In 2017, Hicks started a YouTube channel with the goal of sharing knowledge with others wanting to learn game development.

== Games ==
Game	Platform	Release year
The Path of Motus	PlayStation 4, Xbox One, Steam	2018
Pillar	PlayStation 4, Xbox One, Xbox 360, Steam	2015
Sententia	Xbox 360	2012
Honor in Vengeance II	Xbox 360	2011
Honor in Vengeance	Xbox 360	2011
