= The Path of Motus =

2018 video game

- Designer: Michael Hicks
- Programmer: Michael Hicks
- Artist: Gonçalo Antunes
- Writer: Michael Hicks
- Composer: Michael Hicks
- Platforms: PlayStation 4; Xbox One; Windows
- Release: 2018
- Genre: Puzzle-platform

The Path of Motus is a puzzle-platform game designed by Michael Hicks for PlayStation 4, Xbox One, and Microsoft Windows. The game follows a goblin named Motus who is trapped inside a mysterious forest. He plans to escape by building bridges through the forest, but his determination is challenged by bullies that use their own words to destroy him. The game was made using the MonoGame framework.

== Gameplay ==
The Path of Motus features a variety of gameplay, including puzzles and action platforming. Motus' main goal is to connect groups of nodes together to design bridges. In between this he meets bullies that attack him with deadly words. Motus must tactfully use his own words to deal with the bullies. On top of bridge puzzles, an additional puzzle system was designed to express what Motus is feeling at various times in the story.

== Plot ==
Motus is a six-year-old boy who dreams of finding a way through the forest his village is trapped in. Using art supplies passed down to him from his father, he begins designing bridges through the forest. He soon meets bullies that try to stop him from completing his quest. However, not all of the bullies are hostile. Motus also meets conflicted bullies that express a sense of confusion at the situation.

== Development ==
The origin for The Path of Motus started in 2012, when Hicks and Antunes released an early version of the game called Sententia for Xbox 360. Hicks expressed frustration towards video games before Sententia's development, and questioned why games he played weren't as emotionally engaging as other forms of media he consumed. Hicks soon became interested in using gameplay "as a way to express meaningful ideas" and began development on Sententia to experiment with this approach.

The game was quickly finished after three months, and was released as part of the Indie Games Uprising, an event Hicks helped coordinate. The game was poorly received, but Hicks was undeterred and went on to spend two years refining his design ideas. The result was a game called Pillar for PlayStation 4, a game inspired by human psychology. Pillar was more successful than Sententia, generating over 320,000 downloads and a showcase at the Game Developer's Conference.

Pillar's release gave Hicks and Antunes confidence to return to Sententia. The team took the core idea from the original, but approached the execution in a similar way to Pillar. Due to the final product being so different, they renamed the game to The Path of Motus. It was released on July 17, 2018.
