= This is How You Will Die =

Digital poetry and art game

- Author: Jason Nelson
- Language: English
- Genre: Digital poetry, art game, electronic literature
- Publication date: 2006
- Website: digitalcreatures.net

This is How You Will Die is an interactive digital poetry and art game created by Jason Nelson, a new media artist, digital poet, and lecturer. Released in 2005, the game combines elements of poetry, digital art, and chance-based mechanics to explore the concept of death and the unpredictability of life.

The work enacts a slot machine predicting how the reader will die, and has been described as "an aleatoric gambling machine predicting the cause, nature, and aftermath of the player's death." Leonardo Flores writes that the "playful interfaces and darkly humorous tone serve as a kind of sugar coating for serious themes and personal exploration". Scott Rettberg argues that "the combinatory element is effective here because the arbitrary nature of the random element is, in fact, no less arbitrary, and no less absurd, than mortality itself."

== Reception ==
The work has been taught at a number of universities, has been the object of a number of scholarly interpretations, is frequently mentioned in discussions of new media art, and has also received attention from mainstream media. The work has been praised by many for its innovative approach to digital poetry and its thought-provoking content.

== Awards ==
The work won the First Panliterary Award for Web Art from the literary journal Drunken Boat. One of the judges, Talan Memmott, described it as "a thorough example of the power of inference through an integrated use of media technologies and methods of signification".
