= Martine Neddam =

French-Dutch media artist

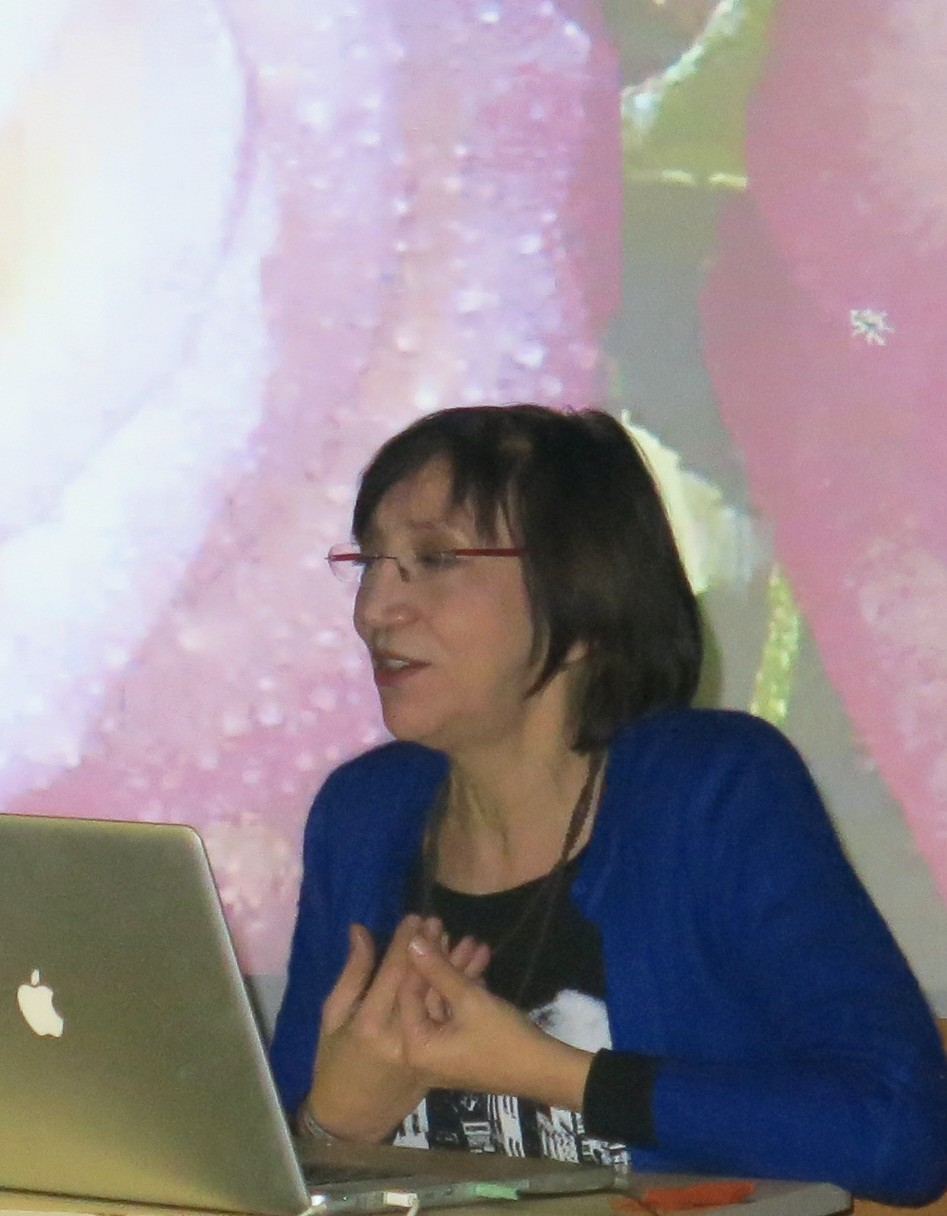
Image of Martine Neddam

Martine Neddam (born 27 January 1953 in Oran) is a visual artist, research scientist and professor. She is a native of France and lives and works in Amsterdam. She teaches at the Gerrit Rietveld Academy and the University of Quebec in Montreal (UQAM)

== Education ==
Martine Neddam studied linguistics and literature in Lyon, France from 1975 to 1979 and stage design from 1983 to 1984 at the School of Architecture in Lyon, France. From 1988 to 1989 she studied at the Institut des Hautes Etudes at the Arts Plastiques in Paris.

== Works ==
Neddam began her career as an artist in 1988, creating text objects (banners, plaques, shadows on the wall) that were exhibited in museums and galleries. She also created large-scale public commissions in several European countries, including in the Netherlands, France and Great Britain.

Early works - Text objects and light sculptures

Neddam uses language in a triangular relationship between the author, communication, and reader as the starting point for her installations and projects. This relationship plays a crucial role in her artworks, from the early text-based drapery works such as 'Connard' or 'Arache-moi' to 'Walk on Me' and 'La Scala'. Her sculptures incorporate light, which creates subtle and almost immaterial effects. Neddam's sculptures are visually enhanced by the use of direct and personal language, adding depth and dimension to the artwork. The viewer's attention is drawn to the artwork through the use of direct language. The viewer's attention is drawn to the artwork through the use of direct language.

In 1992, Neddam was commissioned to create a work titled 'Marche sur moi' (Walk on me) for the cupola of the Municipal Museum in Arnhem. The installation features words on the floor and wall panels that engage in a dialogue with each other and the viewer.

The words are: Walk over me, step over me, stamp on me, crush me, dirty me, sully me, again, and again and again.

The wall text says in response: “Me too, me too …”

From 1993 to 2013, ‚La Scala’, a work which commissioned by the municipality of Haarlemmermeer, was installed on the roof top of the De Meerse Theater. The work is a light object made of neon lights in the shape of a ladder that narrows as if in perspective. „The origin of this work lies in language'. La Scala is the title, after the name of the famous theater in Milan. It literally means 'The ladder‘.“ The Italian term 'La Scala', which means ladder, also means scale in the sense of 'a proportion of a floor plan' in French. Each step on the ladder represents the perspective and emotion of the theater.

Online Works and Virtual Characters

Neddam began creating virtual characters with independent artistic existences in 1996, never revealing the real author. One of her most well-known characters is Mouchette, a 13-year-old girl who shares online the fantasies arising from her dark imagination. Neddam used early Web 2.0 features for this project, and Mouchette has since become a cult icon. Neddam has created various works exploring the character's identity and impact. Neddam created Mouchette after being inspired by Robert Bresson's film of the same name. Mouchette.org presents virtual characters that investigate language and representation, with the viewer as a participant and responder.

In 2001, Neddam created David Still. He offers his identity and the use of his email account to all passing websurfers. In 2006, she created XiaoQian, a Chinese artist who creates virtual persons. These virtual characters function more as communication tools than as mere portraits. They engage in dialogue with the public, trigger their reactions, stimulate exchange between visitors, and archive these exchanges to recycle them into new works of art.

'My Desktop Life' is a project that was created in 2014. It enables users to create a personal narrative by combining their own videos, images, text, and sounds. The project is designed to be user-friendly and accessible to a broad audience. The narrative is presented in a constantly evolving timeline as the user adds or edits content

In recent years, Neddam has abandoned the anonymity associated with virtual characters. She has seamlessly combined her work in the public space, her work on language, and her work on the internet into art. Additionally, she has created new works that employ a fresh approach to character development. „Neddam archives the material and devotes herself to the preservation of pages threatened with dissolution. Her characters also serve for the derivation of works in other media.“

== Works (Selection) ==
- 1991 Connard
- 1992 Walk On Me
- 1993 La Scala
- 1993 Illumination…The Great…Meaning
- 1994 Teylers Museum Haarlem (text label)
- 1994 There is No Copyright on Laws
- 1995 Ooit
- 1996 Mouchette
- 2001 David Still
- 2006 XiaoQian
- 2008 Virtual Person
- 2014 My Desktop Life

== Exhibitions (Selection) ==
- 1987: Maison des Expositions de Genas, Frankreich
- 1988: Galerie La Tournelle, Poet-Laval, Frankreich
- 1988: Galerie Didier Michallet, Lyon, Frankreich
- 1989: Galerie Tany Rumpff, Haarlem, Niederlande
- 1990: Centre d'Art Contemporain, Brüssel, Belgien
- 1990: Maison du Livre, de l'image et du son, Villeurbanne, Frankreich
- 1991: Galerie Tanya Rumpff, Haarlem, die Niederlande
- 1992: Galerie Verney-Carron, Villeurbanne, Frankreich - Gemeentemuseum Arnheim - Galerie de Zaal, Delft
- 1993: Galerie De Meerse, Hoofddorp
- 1994: Französisches Institut in Edinburgh, Schottland
- 1994: Teylers Museum, Haarlem
- 1995: Schottische Nationalgalerie, Edinburgh, Schottland
- 1998: Musée Lamartine, Mâcon, Frankreich
- 2011: La Biennale de Montréal, Canada
- 2012: City of Women Ljubljana Slovenia (Turkmenbashi, mon amour), Slovenia
- 2013: KITAKYUSHU BIENNIAL 2013 i information / SIngapore The Private Museum
- 2014: ZKM Karlsruhe - ArtOnYourScreen (AOYS), Germany
- 2016: Whitechapel Gallery, London, England
- 2018/2020: Stedelijk Museum, Netherlands
- 2019: ZKM Karlsruhe, Germany
- 2023: Nieuwe Institut Rotterdam, Netherlands

== Prizes and Awards (Selection) ==
- 1988: Light artwork for a facade in Vénissieux, Frankrijk
- 1991: Light artwork for a tunnel, Night Lines, Utrecht
- 2004: Work scholarship Edit-Ruß-Haus for Media Art in Oldenburg

== Bibliography ==
  - Martine Neddam: Tout sur le quod = Everything about the quid = Alles over het Wat, Madden, E. &Martine Neddam, ISBN 9789072861115, Published by Arnhem : Gemeentemuseum Arnhem, 1992
  - Artforum 39 (2000/01), 9 (May): Immaterial girl, Harris, Jane, page 30
  - Internet art, Rachel Greene, 2004 ISBN 0-500-20376-8 - about Mouchette p. 114
  - New Media Art, Mark Tribe, Reena Jana, Köln 2007 p. 66f, ISBN 9783822830383
  - Knotenpunkte: ein Ausstellungsexperiment mit sieben KünstlerInnen an sieben Orten in NRW. - Bönen, 2007. Mouchette, Pages 146 - 171 ISBN 9783939825630
  - Kampmann, Matthias: Netzkunst : ihre Systematisierung und Auslegung anhand von Einzelbeispielen. - Weimar, 2009. ISBN 978-3-89739-642-5 (Zugl. Freiburg, Univ. DIss., 2008), p. 282ff Mouchette und die Internet-Community
  - Electronic Superhighway: from experiments in art and technology to art after the internet, London, 2016. ISBN 978-0-85488-246-5
  - The Art Happens Here: Net Art Anthology: Martine Neddam, Mouchette, 1996-ongoing, New York, 2019. - ISBN 978-0-692-17308-4
  - Curating Digital Art, From Presenting and Collecting Digital art to Networked Co-Curation: Interview as Madja Edelstein-Gomez with Annet Dekker, Anette Dekker, 2021 ISBN 9789493246010

== Texts ==
- Can Mouchette be preserved as an identity - LIMA 2020 by Patricia Black
- Paule Mackrous: »Imaginary Friends« (2010)
- Leonardo Flores: Confessional Poetry (2013)
- Martine Neddam: Because I'm an Artist too… Amsterdam 2012
- Annet Dekker: »How to be Pink and Conceptual at the Same Time« (Interview, 2011)
- Annet Dekker: Versions, Comments, and Authenticity (2011)
- Martine Neddam in conversation with Annet Dekker in Navigating E-culture, Cathy Brickwood, Annet Dekker - Editors, 2009 ISBN 978-94-90108-02-1
- Paule Mackrous: Le partage sur le Web : personnages virtuels et Web 2.0 selon Martine Neddam (2009)
- Paule Mackrous: La Figure Mythique de Mouchette: Effet de Présence et Rituel (2007)
- Interview mit Peter Luining (2005)
