= City Hall Park Historic District =

Historic district in Vermont, United States

- U.S. National Register of Historic Places
- U.S. Historic district
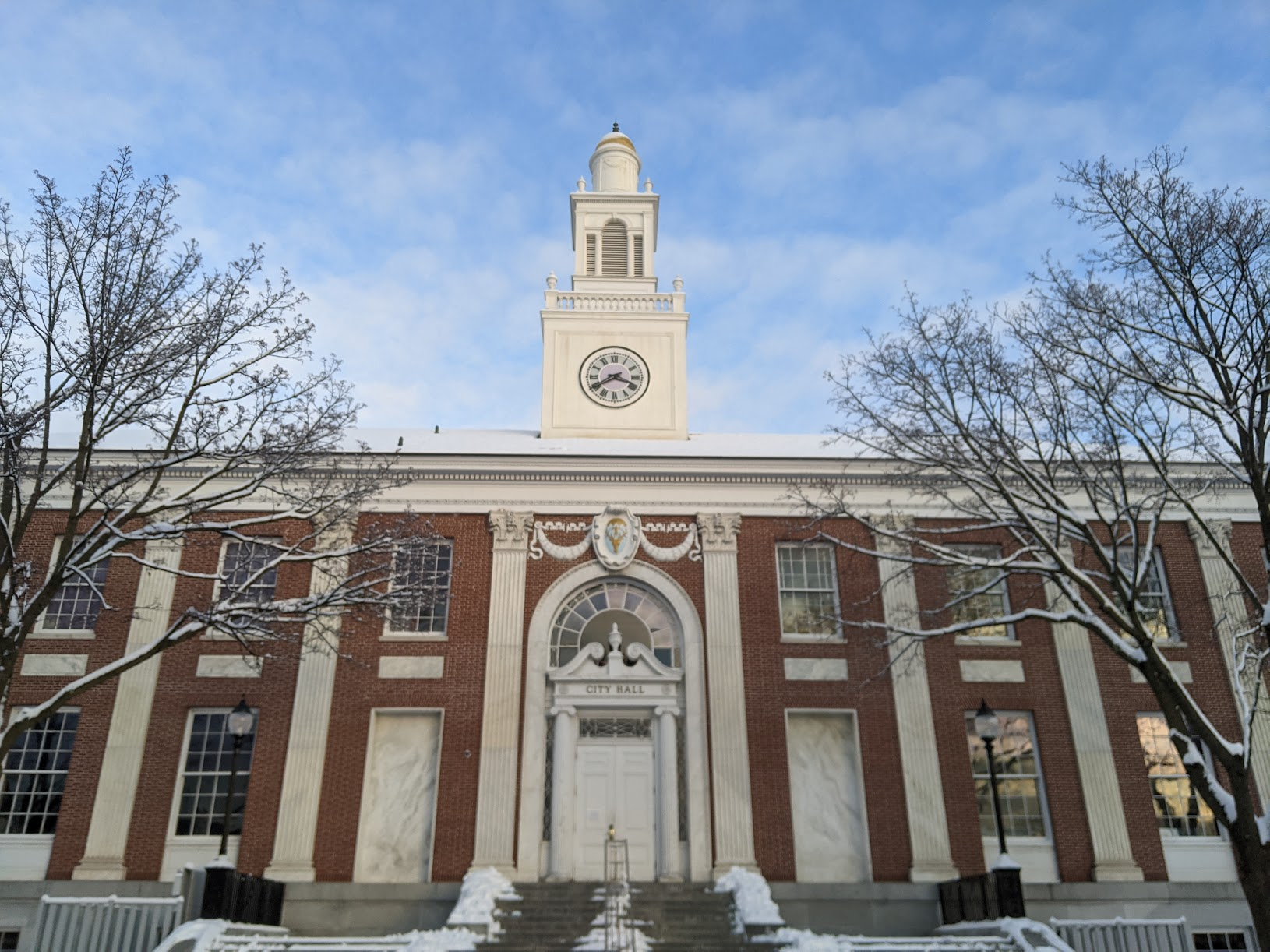
- The Burlington City Hall

- Location within Vermont Location within the United States
- Location: Church, College, Main and St. Paul Sts., Burlington, Vermont
- Coordinates: 44°28′35″N 73°12′49″W
- Area: 8 acres (3.2 ha)
- Architectural style: Mixed (more Than 2 Styles From Different Periods), Romanesque, Sullivanesque
- NRHP reference No.: 83003206
- Added to NRHP: June 9, 1983

The City Hall Park Historic District encompasses one of the central economic, civic, and public spaces of the city of Burlington, Vermont. Centered on City Hall Park, the area's architecture encapsulates the city's development from a frontier town to an urban commercial center. The district was listed on the National Register of Historic Places in 1983.

== Description and history ==
City Hall Park is located at the southern end of the Church Street Marketplace in downtown Burlington. The park occupies most of a city block, with the eastern side of the block lined by buildings separating it from Church Street. It has a network of paths radiating out from a central fountain, and otherwise consists of grassy areas dotted with trees. The three buildings on the east side are formally oriented to Church Street, but present proper facades to the park. The southernmost building is Burlington City Hall, a large neo-Classical and Georgian Revival building constructed in 1928 to a design by W.M. Kendall of McKim, Mead, and White. The park is bounded on the other three sides by Main Street, St. Paul Street, and College Street, each of which is lined with commercial buildings. These are almost uniformly three stories in height and built of brick, and most were built between about 1880 and 1930. The most architecturally sophisticated of these is the Burlington Savings Bank Building at the corner of College and St. Paul, built in 1900 in a high interpretation of the Renaissance Revival. The historic district excludes the buildings on the west side of the park, which are included in the abutting Wells-Richardson Complex historic district, and includes buildings on the west side of Church Street south of Main. The latter buildings are of a more diverse architecture, including some that date to the early 19th century.

Burlington's City Hall Park was originally known as Court House Square, and was laid out in the late 18th century, roughly midway between its waterfront and its early inland commercial area on College Hill to the north. This site may have been chosen as a compromise between competing business interests, and it provided a level area for a public park. It saw its most rapid growth in the second quarter of the 19th century, after the opening of the Champlain Canal brought a mercantile economic boom to the city. Most of the buildings now lining the square were built as larger replacements for the wood-frame buildings of this early boom, with most of the construction taking place in between 1890 and 1915, and in the 1920s.

== See also ==
- National Register of Historic Places listings in Chittenden County, Vermont
