= Mudcraft =

2004 video game

- Developer(s): The LlamaPad
- Publisher(s): The LlamaPad
- Director(s): Brian Winn
- Designer(s): Brian Winn, Jason Tye
- Artist(s): Jason Tye, Patti Banyas
- Platform(s): Windows
- Release: 2004
- Genre(s): Real-time strategy
- Mode(s): Single-player

Mudcraft is a web-based shockwave real-time strategy single player game developed by students at Michigan State University. In the RTS genre, it uses gender-neutral gameplay designed for both core and casual gamers. Players control mud people, attempting to create structures and more mud people, as well as stay alive despite the elements and animals. The gameplay is similar to games such as StarCraft and Warcraft, thus the "craft" suffix. The biggest difference is a lack of violence.

Mudcraft was nominated for the 2005 Independent Games Festival Competition, won the "Future Game Talent Award" at the Future Play 2005 International Conference, the "Outstanding Media Project in Games" and "Best of Show in Games" at the DMAT Showcase 2005, May 6, 2005 and 2nd place "Best Game Award", 2005 Indiana IDEAs Festival, April 23, 2004.

A downloadable version and an expanded pay-to-play "full" version is also available from the official site.
