= Pillar (video game) =

2015 video game

- Designer: Michael Hicks
- Artist: Gonçalo Antunes
- Composer: Michael Hicks
- Platforms: PlayStation 4; Windows; Xbox 360; Xbox One; Nintendo Switch
- Release: February 17, 2015: PlayStation 4, Windows, Xbox 360; WW: February 17, 2015 (PC); NA: February 17, 2015 (PS4, X360); PAL: February 18, 2015 (PS4); Xbox One; WW: September 26, 2018; Nintendo Switch; WW: March 5, 2019
- Genre: Puzzle
- Mode: Single-player

Pillar is an independent video game designed by Michael Hicks for PlayStation 4, Windows, Xbox 360, Xbox One, and Nintendo Switch. Described as a collection of minigames where each game represents a different type of personality found in people, each level in Pillar has different gameplay mechanics to examine various personality traits and themes. Reviewers noted the game's exploration of themes such as love, religion, capitalism, aging and regret.

== Gameplay ==
Pillar is made up of several levels, each starring a different character with their own set of gameplay mechanics. Examples include introverted characters who can only be around NPCs for so long before their energy drains, resulting in the player using stealth strategies. Extroverted characters are tasked with repairing and turning on lightposts throughout the town, they can only complete these puzzles by interacting with other extroverts, responding to moves they have made.

== Development ==
Hicks started work on Pillar in August 2012 and worked on the game in various locations, including a church. Artist Gonçalo Antunes worked on the art remotely from Portugal. A month before the game's announcement, Hicks wrote an article published in Develop explaining his struggles with burnout while working on the game.

Pillar was officially announced in August 2014. Hicks cited the film Magnolia, the Myers-Briggs Personality Test and real life relationships as influences on the game. He also explained his goal to tell a story non-verbally through the gameplay mechanics and cited Jonathan Blow and Jason Rohrer as influences for this idea.

The game was originally planned for a 2014 release but was delayed until 2015, releasing February 17.

=== Music ===
Pillar's soundtrack was composed by Michael Hicks and inspired by ambient artists Brian Eno, Sigur Rós, Nils Frahm, Peter Broderick and experimental musician Tim Hecker. Hicks approached the soundtrack in an unorthodox manner, composing each song as he designed the level it was intended for. He claimed the music influenced game design decisions and vice versa, resulting in a "cohesive experience".

The soundtrack was independently released via Bandcamp a few months before the game's release.

Music For Pillar track list
No.	Title	Length
1.	"Who/What/Where?"	02:04
2.	"Pillar"	01:46
3.	"I Met You... Again"	05:54
4.	"Bonkers (Slow)"	04:28
5.	"Gathering Place"	04:10
6.	"The Cathedral / What Little You Have"	02:56
7.	"Frivolous"	01:12
8.	"Cooperate / Ancient Prophecies"	05:42
9.	"To Find Peace (During Winter) / Unexpected Visitor"	02:10
10.	"Gathering Place pt. 2 / Life in a Museum"	06:25
Total length:		36:51

== Reception ==
Pillar

Aggregate scores
Aggregator	Score
GameRankings	59.38% (PS4)
Metacritic	59/100 (PS4)

Pillar received mixed reviews from critics, with a score on review aggregator Metacritic of 59/100. Critics generally praised the game's art and music, but were divided on the game's execution. Writing for PlayStation LifeStyle, Gary Behan responded well to the game's intuitive storytelling concluding "Pillar is a very good game. It's pretty, charming, original in its execution and designed with a love for video games and a passion to do something different with them." David Roberts of the Ulster Star echoed these statements, calling the game "beautifully constructed, original [and] challenging".

In a mixed review for Game Informer, Matt Helgeson criticized the gameplay as being "more tiresome than enjoyable" and expressed confusion at the game's plot, failing to see how the elements came together in any meaningful way. He concluded with a plug for the game's soundtrack, stating it has a chance of being one of his favorites of all time. Bradley Marsh of GameStyle wrote that Pillar "clearly isn't for everyone. But if you like to use your own imagination whilst being tested, then you will get a good experience here."

Matt Whittaker of Hardcore Gamer felt the game was a missed opportunity, criticizing the gameplay. Whittaker felt Pillar would benefit without puzzles in the first place, he concluded that "rudimentary puzzle design overshadows every emotional undertone so greatly that boredom is more likely to ensue than introspection."
