= Honor in Vengeance II =

2011 video game

- Developer: MichaelArts
- Publisher: MichaelArts
- Platform: Xbox Live Indie Games
- Release: NA: August 5, 2011
- Genre: Space Shooter
- Mode: Single-player

Honor in Vengeance II is a 3D space shooter by American developer MichaelArts. It was released for Xbox Live Indie Games on August 5, 2011. The game follows the story of a Martian pilot named Leo Lucas, who is tasked with finding the remnants of a recon team that vanished near Earth.

== Development ==
Michael Hicks, the lead developer and founder of MichaelArts, developed Honor in Vengeance II in an almost secretive manner. Known for usually documenting the progress of his games via web diaries, he announced at the MichaelArts Forums that he would not be documenting the development process for personal reasons. No other information was publicly known about the game until a trailer was featured in June, 2011 on the popular media website GameTrailers. An official release date for August 5, 2011 was announced in the first week of August.

Hicks, who developed Honor in Vengeance II when he was 18, stated that he personally spent "thousands upon thousands" of hours working on the game and that considerable planning had gone into the series' storyline. He went on to cite Star Wars: Rogue Squadron as a "huge influence" on the Honor in Vengeance series.

The game's development team consisted of a small group of individuals that Hicks met through the internet.

== Plot ==
Honor in Vengeance II is based around a Martian pilot named Leo Lucas, who is sent to discover what happened to a Martian recon team that mysteriously vanished near Earth. Lucas learns that his brother, Juno, was among them.

== Reception ==
Honor in Vengeance II received favorable reviews and was praised for fixing a number of technical issues with the first installment and for its innovative style. Jonathan Lester of Dealspwn praised the game's enemy armadas, graphics and voice acting. He summarized saying "Honor In Vengeance II brings the rain, brings the fleets and brings it home. 80 Microsoft Points is an unbelievable bargain for what it has to offer." Tristan Rendo of Clearance Bin Review featured Honor in Vengeance II on the site's XBLIG Spotlight column and awarded the game a 7.5/10, he praised the game's focus on story and commented that "while Honor in Vengeance is a far cry from stunning, it is probably the best 3D game I've played on the service so far. There's honor in this purchase."

Not all reviews were as positive, however, blogger David Cooper criticized the enemy AI, and gave the game a 2.5/5, noting that "it is exciting to see something like this exist on the indie game scene, especially on the Xbox 360, as it implies innovation and thinking outside the typical indie games offered, but the execution is somewhat sloppy."
