= Le Louvre: The Palace & Its Paintings =

1995 video game

- Developer: Montparnasse Multimedia
- Publisher: BMG Interactive
- Platforms: Windows, Macintosh
- Release: 1995
- Genre: Educational
- Mode: Single-player

Le Louvre: The Palace & Its Paintings is a 1995 art game developed by Montparnasse Multimedia and published by BMG Interactive.

== Development ==
Le Louvre: The Palace & Its Paintings was developed by Montparnasse Multimedia, a company founded in 1992. The game was received six months after the founding of BMG Interactive Entertainment as an "interactive leisure" subsidiary of Bertelsmann. The game cost 1.3 million francs to make, and by February 1996 BMG had reported profits. It was one game in a series by BMG, including Musee D´Orsay, Michelangelo, Inuit.

== Content ==
The title offers an interactive multimedia exploration of the Louvre collection.

== Reception ==
Entertainment Weekly praised the game's achievements despite its graphical limitations, deeming it "thoughtful — and less taxing" than a trip to Paris. People magazine thought the game wouldn't offer new insights to art lovers, but had the potential to inspire non-art lovers to take a trip to the Louvre. Billboard felt the title was the "grandaddy" of the art-based game genre, and praised the developer's choice to narrow down the collection to 100 items to prevent the feeling of overwhelm. Newsweek deemed it "satisfying".

The game sold 15,000 copies by February 1996, and by January 1997 it had sold more than 300,000 copies. The game ultimately sold over 1 million copies worldwide by 2000.

Le Louvre: The Palace & Its Paintings was a finalist in the Best Overall Multimedia Production category in the 1996 CODiE Awards.
