= Game, game, game and again game =

Digital poem and art video game

Game, Game, Game, and again Game
- Author: Jason Nelson
- Language: English
- Genre: Digital poetry, Art games, Electronic literature
- Publication date: 2007
- Website: http://www.digitalcreatures.net

Game, Game, Game, and again Game is a digital poem and art video game by Jason Nelson, published on the web in 2007. The poem takes the form of a hand-drawn online platform game where lines of the poem appear as the reader plays the game.

It was translated into French by Amélie Paquet for Revue Blueorange in 2010. Its sequel is I made this. You play this. We are Enemies, released in 2009.

== Gameplay and reading experience ==
Although the game uses game mechanics that are familiar from simple platform games, the hand-drawn graphics and the integration of poetic lines and phrases draw attention to the literary and aesthetic features of the experience. Rather than striving for a high score, the player is "moving, jumping, and falling through an excessive, disjointed, poetic atmosphere".

Game, Game, Game, and again Game has "high interpretive difficulty from a minimal mechanical difficulty", Patrick Jagoda argues. By this he means that it is easy to play the game, but difficult to interpret the meaning of the game while playing it. Jagoda writes: "the game includes relatively few enemies and obstacles, avoids substantial punitive measures for the avatar's death, and gives the player an unlimited number of lives". However, the level names are often long and subtitled, but disappear quickly, cheating the reader-player of the "slow reflectiveness that is both possible and encouraged in print-based poetry".

Game was included in the Electronic Literature Collection Vol. 2. In their introduction to the work, the editors write that the gameplay is: "a way to lure the user through [Nelson's] many levels of writing, drawings and old home movies with a simple but effective reward, increased survival."

The gameplay is part of the archives of The NEXT, where it is documented in video recordings. Videos of the gameplay have also been shared as Let's Play videos.

== Reception ==
The game has been taught at several universities such as Davidson College, Yale University, and UCLA. Nelson himself describes his surprise at the online attention the game received when reviewed on game sites: "Here was an artwork, considered experimental in the fields of electronic art and writing (a digital poem and art-game for crusty crunk's sake), and it was being discussed, shared, blasted and praised as a game".

L.B. Jeffries writes that it will "forever change how you think about video games." David Thomas Henry Wright notes that "disrupts commercial video game design". However, Maria Engberg and Jay David Bolter argue that the game "nevertheless strikes the player/reader as playful, rather than menacing or laden with corporate critique". Astrid Ensslin describes it as "primarily playable rather than readable".
