= Mouchette.org =

Internet artwork by Martine Neddam

- The mouchette.org homepage
- Website type: Internet art
- Available in: English/French
- Owner: Martine Neddam
- Creator: "Mouchette"(pseudonym) for Martine Neddam
- Website: mouchette.org
- Launched: 1996
- Current status: Active

Mouchette.org is an interactive website and Internet art piece created in 1996 by Martine Neddam, under the pseudonym "Mouchette". The site contains themes of sex, death, and violence.

Mouchette is loosely based on the 1937 book Mouchette by Georges Bernanos and the 1967 film Mouchette by Robert Bresson. The plot revolves around a French teenager who commits suicide after she is raped.

== Summary and themes ==
My name is Mouchette
I live in Amsterdam
I am nearly 13 years old
I am an artist...

The front page of the website contains text that is meant to appear innocent, in order to provide contrast with the website's other contents. The webpage's other subpages consists of interactive texts, secret links, and multiple poems.

=== Suicide, death, and violence ===
Similarly to the film Mouchette, one of the themes throughout Mouchette.org is the idea of death. The recurring image of a fly is present on many of the pages. The word "mouchette" translates into English as "little fly." Comparable lives of the Mouchettes – the fly and the girl – intersect when they revolve around the fly's death.

=== Sex ===
"Sexually suggestive" themes are present throughout the site. Many of the site's pages have interactive web forms that request the user's email address. Days or weeks later, the viewer might get unexpected flirtatious email messages from Mouchette.

=== Manipulating identity ===
Visitors are allowed to "become Mouchette" when they become members of the "Mouchette Network." Members can create their webpages on the site and are given "a unique opportunity to become a great artist." The interactive questionnaires often will ask viewers to post their name and email address if they answer one of the questions.

The website's exploration of the manipulation of identity has been compared to the conceptual photographer Cindy Sherman.

== Criticism and controversy ==
An online quiz comparing the "Neo-Mouchette" to the movie angered Bresson's widow, so she threatened a lawsuit against the artist behind the project. The quiz was later taken down after that incident. It is currently available and is hosted by other websites as a protest against abusive copyright laws.

In an early version of Mouchette.org, a quiz compared web persona Mouchette and the lead character in Bresson's film Mouchette. Images taken from the film were used in this quiz. In 2002, the Bresson estate threatened legal action against the Mouchette.org author. Subsequently, the French Society of Dramatic Authors and Composers banned the content.
