= The BCA Center =

Coordinates: 44.476519°N 73.212813°W

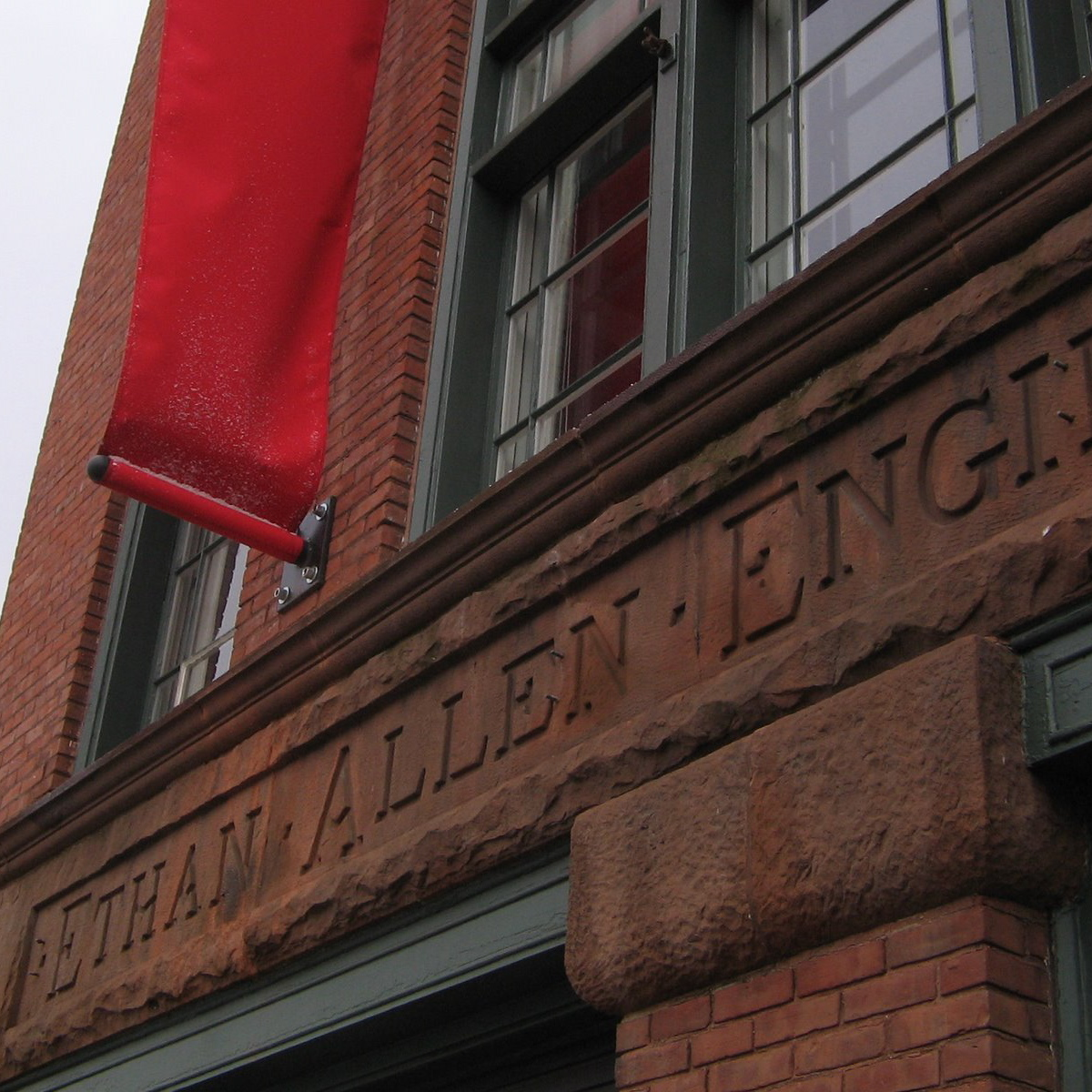
- Front of The BCA Center. The inscription pays tribute to its history as the Ethan Allen Firehouse.
- Established: 1995
- Location: 135 Church Street; Burlington, Vermont
- Type: Contemporary arts center
- Owner: Burlington City Arts
- Website: www.burlingtoncityarts.org/bca-center

Burlington City Arts (formerly The Firehouse Gallery, or The Center, or the Firehouse Center for the Visual Arts) is an art gallery, art education/studio centre and cultural events space in Burlington, Vermont. The building was originally built as the Ethan Allen Firehouse on Church Street in 1889. The building is owned by the City of Burlington. Burlington City Arts uses the building for its exhibits, lectures, and educational programs. The gallery has been open since 1995.

== History ==
The Ethan Allen Firehouse is a historic building located in downtown Burlington. It was designed by local architect A.B. Fisher and completed in 1889, serving as home to the Ethan Allen Engine Company No. 4, one of Burlington's volunteer fire departments. In 1927, the building was acquired by the Burlington Police Department, and later, in 1967, it became unoccupied and fell into disrepair.

In 1973, the building was slated for demolition, but due to community interest, the Board of Aldermen decided to halt the demolition and allocate funds for its stabilization. Over the years, various organizations utilized the space, including the offices of U.S. Senator Patrick Leahy and the University of Vermont's Church Street Center.

In 1995, the Burlington City Arts (BCA) began developing the concept of an arts center, and the Firehouse Gallery moved into half of the ground floor. The Ethan Allen Firehouse was eventually chosen to house this arts center.

== Renovation ==
In 1999, the City Council voted to transform the firehouse into the Firehouse Center for the Visual Arts. BCA hired an architect for the renovation and in the spring of 2001, they began construction. After a few months, progress stopped when a large crack developed on the north wall and the building sank by about 4 inches (100 mm). After much stabilization, construction resumed.

To complete the renovation, Shelburne Museum returned the original bell back to the Firehouse tower.

The BCA Center (formerly Firehouse Center for the Visual Arts) opened to the public in 2002. It includes a community darkroom and photography studio; artist-in-residence studio; multimedia conference facility for lectures, film series, and panel discussions; and Resource Room and Library with public meeting space and Internet access.

=== The BCA Center galleries ===
The BCA Center presents exhibitions, and high-quality artwork, as well as exhibition-related discussions, and arts activities. Their exhibitions and education programming attempt to build and sustain audiences for contemporary art outside of major urban centers.

=== Roof and Cupola ===
In 2001, BCA Center learned that the Shelburne Museum hoped to give the original bell back to the Firehouse tower. Ravaged by years of water, damage, a re-engineering and renovation of the tower as well as a concentrated fundraising effort took place. The bell was hoisted back into its home on September 12, 2002.

== See also ==
- List of museums in Vermont
