= Jason Nelson (poet) =

American poet

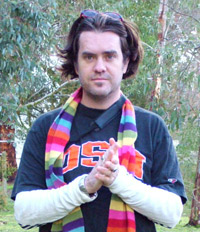
- Born: Oklahoma City, United States

Jason Nelson is a digital and hypermedia poet and artist. He is a Professor of Digital Culture and a PI at the Center for Digital Narrative at the University of Bergen, where he was also a Fulbright Fellow from 2016-17. Until 2020 he was a lecturer on Cyberstudies, digital writing and creative practice at Griffith University in Queensland, Australia. He is best known for his artistic flash games/essays such as Game, game, game and again game and I made this. You play this. We are Enemies. He has worked on the Australia Council of the Arts Literature Board and the Board of the Electronic Literature Organization based at MIT.

Nelson's style of Web art merges various genres and technologies, focusing on collages of poetry, image, sound, movement and interaction.

== Early life and education ==
Nelson grew up in Oklahoma City, Oklahoma. He has a BA from the University of Oklahoma and an MFA in New Media Writing from Bowling Green State University. He began work as a poet, and has created over 30 digital works of art. As of 2009, he teaches Cyberstudies, digital art, and digital creative writing at Griffith University in Queensland, Australia.

Nelson is known as a cyberpoet, using multiple media that merge and transform into each other. His style of "mixture chaos" and art nouveau has led to mixed reviews. Some critics cannot see past the "characteristic messiness" or "strangeness" in his approach, with the Wall Street Journal calling his work "as alienating as modern art can get". Others have described his work as "Basquiat meets Mario Brothers", and said that it represents the future of poetry and art games.

== Works ==
The artist's work is often described as being interdisciplinary, crossing over into different fields of art and writing. These include poetry, hypermedia art, digital art, writing and game play and science. And many of the artist's works are exploring the intersection of interface and technology and how it impacts digital writing and art.

=== Static art and essays ===
Nelson's art portal, secrettechnology.com, won a Webby Award in the "Weird" category in 2009. Some of his works include Between Treacherous Objects, The Poetry Cube, The Bomar Gene, Pandemic Rooms.

- Vholoce: Weather Visualiser uses RSS weather feeds to generate a series of aesthetic visualizations.
- Uncontrollable Semantics uses a basic mouse-follower, pulling together 50 different sound, image and interactive environments. Each environment offers four directions to four terms, four semantics, and four named creatures.
- The Poetry Cube is an interactive poetry cube, where users can enter a sixteen-line poem which is then transformed into a multi-dimensional cube. Poems by writers such as Charles Bernstein and Adrienne Rich are included in the cube's saved database.

=== Interactive art and games ===
Many of Nelson's works require effort and a bit of skill on the part of the viewer. Some are framed explicitly as games, others as elaborate mechanisms for progressing through a series of elements of a work.

- This is How You Will Die (2006) is one of Nelson's most famous pieces strictly as a work of art - a slot machine for predicting death, using code for an online pokie game and 15 five-line death fictions/poetics. Players can win death videos and free spins. (Note: See also "Jason Nelson Speaks from the Machine ", with a photo of Nelson giving lecture with "Between Treacherous Objects" featured behind him. The photo was taken at Penn State University.)
- Game, game, game and again game (2007) and its sequel I made this. You play this. We are Enemies (2009), are Nelson's most well-known works. They are flash platform games that seem as if they are played inside someone's stream of consciousness. They have been played over 8 million times combined. Game, Game Game won an Italian Art Award and received mention on many gaming blogs as either genius or insanity in game form. (Note: See for instance Joystiq, Jay Is Games, and Wired's takes.) The sequel was reviewed as an example of independent art game creation.

=== Other works ===
- The Bomar Gene - an exploration of genes through fictional biographies
- Hermeticon: Pop Spell Maker - This is a 1980s kids commercials combined with 16th-century hermetic texts. After cutting out the hooks, the most compelling spells of our toy- and cereal-fueled world, the videos were compressed and coupled with mysticism. The work also uses a keyboard driven interface. This artwork is part of a larger series of works called Entanglegrids.
- Evidence of Everything Exploding (2009) - a platformer-based poetry game
- Scrape Scraperteeth (2011) - intended to serve as an introduction to art games
- ''Nothing you have done deserves such praise (2013) - an example of electronic literature
- Nine Billion Branches - Interactive poetry

== Awards ==
Nelson has received awards for his digital poetics (in 2005) and for his piece This is How You Will Die (in 2006).

- This is How You Will Die won the First Panliterary Award for Web Art from the Drunken Boat Literary Journal.
- His art portal secrettechnology.com won the 2009 Webby in the "Weird" category.
- Nine Billion Branches won the 2017 QUT Digital Literature Award at the Queensland Literary Awards.
- The Wonders of Lost Trajectories was a finalist in the 2019 QUT Digital Literature Awards at the Queensland Literary Awards.

== See also ==
- Electronic Literature Organization
- Hypertext fiction
- Hypertext poetry
