= John Klima (artist) =

American new media artist (born 1965)

John Klima (born 1965 in Redondo Beach, United States) is an American new media artist, who uses hand-built electronics, computer hardware and software to create online and in gallery artworks.

Received his BFA from State University of New York in 1987

He has had solo exhibitions at Postmasters Gallery and the Whitney Museum's Artport in New York City, and the Bank Gallery in Los Angeles

For a period in 1993 Klima worked as a coder for Microsoft developing Microsoft's internal PowerPoint slides, to create the illusion of a presentation on screen.

In 1996 he worked for the pharmaceutical giant Pfizer, his work with the company included the design of a learning game that was later distributed to the sales representatives of the company for the launch of Zyrtec.

In 2014 John founded Scratchbuilt Studios in Lisbon, Portugal. The studio is used for music and experimental sound projects. In 2018 he was invited to The New Art Fest, an art and technology festival based in Lisbon and exhibited at the National Museum of Natural History and Science (Lisbon).

He lives and works in Brooklyn and is currently adjunct professor at the Rhode Island School of Design and Brooklyn Polytechnic University. Klima was a resident at Eyebeam.

== Works ==
1997: Cartesian Theater

1999: Serbian Skylight

1999: gb AI

1999: pmg

2000: glasbead

2001: Go-Fish

2001: ecosystm

2001: EARTH

2002: Terrain Machine

2002: Speedo-Mat

2002: The Great Game, Epilogue

2002: The Great Game

2002: Context Breeder

2002: American Cinema

2002: Jack and Jill

2002: Political Landscape, Emotional Terrain

2002: EARTH, Discrete Terrains

2003: Time Machine

2003: The Great Game: Iraq Expansion Pack

2004: TERRAIN

2005: TRAIN

2006: RAPUNSEL
