= Lumines: Puzzle Fusion =

2004 video game

- European PSP box art
- Developer: Q Entertainment
- Publishers: PlayStation Portable: JP: Bandai; NA/EU: Ubisoft; Mobile; Gameloft; PlayStation 2 Buena Vista Games; Windows; Q Entertainment
- Designer: Tetsuya Mizuguchi
- Programmer: Katsumi Yokota
- Composer: Takayuki Nakamura
- Series: Lumines
- Platforms: PlayStation Portable, mobile phone, Windows, PlayStation 2
- Release: December 12, 2004: PlayStation Portable; JP: December 12, 2004; NA: March 24, 2005; EU: September 1, 2005 Mobile; NA: March 12, 2006; EU: May 30, 2006 PlayStation 2; EU: February 16, 2007; NA: February 27, 2007 Windows; WW: November 28, 2007
- Genre: Puzzle
- Modes: Single-player, multiplayer

Lumines: Puzzle Fusion (Note: Japanese: ルミネス −音と光の電飾パズル−, Hepburn: Ruminesu − Oto to Hikari no Denshoku Pazuru −; Lumines: Sound and Light Illuminating Puzzle) (pronounced as "Loo-min-ess") is a 2004 puzzle video game developed by Q Entertainment and published for the PlayStation Portable by Bandai in Japan and by Ubisoft elsewhere. The gameplay tasks players to arrange descending two-colored 2×2 blocks to create 2×2 squares of matching color. A vertical line called the "time line" sweeps across the field, erases completed squares, and awards points. Each stage has a skin that affects the background, block colors, music, and the speed of the time line.

Lumines: Puzzle Fusion is the work of video game designer Tetsuya Mizuguchi, who had worked at Sega. Katsumi Yokota contributed to the graphic design and assisted Takayuki Nakamura with music composition. Mizuguchi originally planned a music-heavy Tetris-style game, but licensing issues led him to develop an original concept for Lumines. Mizuguchi was inspired to make a music game on the PSP, one of the few handhelds equipped with a headphone jack. The game was released as a launch title for the PSP in Japan in December 2004, North America in March 2005, and Europe in September 2005. It was later ported for mobile phones, Microsoft Windows, and the PlayStation 2 (PS2); a high-definition remaster was made for the PlayStation 4 (PS4), the Nintendo Switch, the Xbox One, Windows, and Amazon Luna.

Lumines: Puzzle Fusion sold over half a million copies in North America, Europe, and Japan, and was awarded "Best Handheld Game of 2005" by multiple media outlets. Several publications recognized it as one of the top games of 2005 and one of the best-ever launch titles. It was praised for its music and gameplay; multiple reviewers described it as addictive and drew comparisons with Tetris. The ports received less praise than the original version; critics commended the mobile phone version for its new features but criticized its poor sound quality, while the PS2 port was criticized for omitting some songs present in the original. Reviewers complimented the remastered version for enhancing the quality of sounds and visuals but were disappointed that an online multiplayer mode was not included as a new feature. The game spawned numerous spin-offs and sequels for multiple platforms, becoming the first entry in the Lumines series.

== Gameplay ==
Gameplay of Lumines: Puzzle Fusion depicting a transition between background skins. The "time line" sweeps across the screen and clears the completed squares.

Lumines: Puzzle Fusion is a falling block puzzle game. The objective is to arrange grouped blocks descending from the top of a 16×10 grid playing field to create single-color squares once they have landed. Grouped blocks have a 2×2 shape and vary between two colors. Players can rotate the descending grouped blocks, move them left or right, or drop them straight down. When part of the grouped blocks hits an obstruction, the remaining blocks separate from the rest and continue to fall. A single-color square is created when grouped blocks form a 2×2 shape of matching color. Additional blocks of matching color can be used to create larger shapes. The game ends when the blocks pile up to the top of the playing field.

A vertical line known as the "time line" sweeps through the playing field from left to right, erasing any completed single-color groups of blocks it touches and awarding points for each group. If a square is formed while the time line is passing, the portion it intersects is cleared with no points are awarded. Players earn increasing score multipliers by repeatedly clearing squares on consecutive time line sweeps. Additional score bonuses are earned by clearing the playing field or reducing the remaining blocks to a single color. The maximum score is 999,999 points. Blocks with embedded gems are known as "special blocks"; if these are used to create squares, they allow the time line to eliminate adjacent blocks of the same color. Each stage has a skin that affects the background's appearance, the blocks' color scheme, the music track, sound effects, and the speed of the time line. Stages with fast tempos make it more difficult to create large combos, while slow tempos can cause the playing field to fill more quickly.

Lumines: Puzzle Fusion has five modes: Challenge, Single Skin, Time Attack, Puzzle, and Versus. Challenge mode is the main mode and cycles through skins in a fixed order of increasing difficulty. Single Skin mode allows players to select one skin to play for the entire session. In Time Attack mode, players have a limited time to clear as many blocks as possible. Puzzle mode challenges players to arrange blocks to create pictures. In Versus mode, players battle against A.I. opponents or against other players via wireless connections. The Versus mode begins with the playing field divided in half; the goal is to clear successive squares, which shrinks the opposing player's space.

Later ports and remasters added modes such as Arcade, Mission, Shuffle, and Skin Edit mode. Arcade mode is designed for mobile phone ports; players complete a total of 10 stages with CPU versus battles serving as Boss stages after a certain amount of stages are complete. Arcade mode adds blocks that can explode, a third color block within certain stages, and new grouped block shapes such as S-shaped or three-block-wide rectangles. Mission mode tasks players with challenges such as clearing the stage in a certain number of moves or clearing a specified number of columns. Shuffle mode creates game sessions with randomized order of stages. Skin Edit mode allows players to customize their game session by selecting the order of unlocked skins.

== Development and release ==
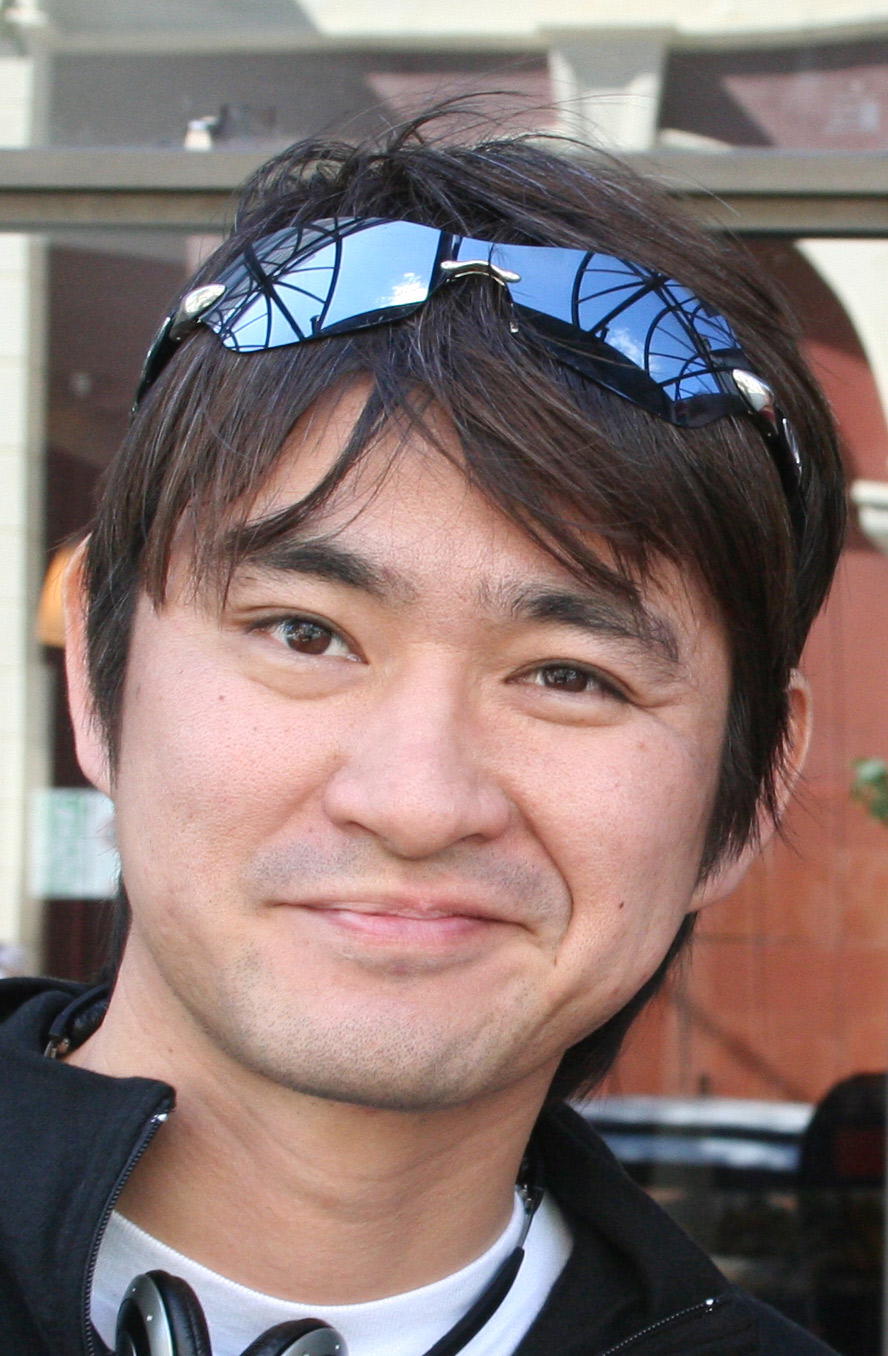
Tetsuya Mizuguchi, the game's lead designer

Lumines: Puzzle Fusion was the first game developed by Q Entertainment with Tetsuya Mizuguchi as the designer. Mizuguchi was part of the studio's founding following his departure from Sega after they dissolved United Game Artists, Mizuguchi's previous venture. It was developed by six people in a year. The game was 75% complete when it was announced at the Tokyo Game Show 2004. When he first learned about the PlayStation Portable (PSP), Mizuguchi was inspired to make a puzzle game with music for the device, which he described as an "interactive Walkman". He considered it ideal for his game because it was one of the few handheld consoles to have a headphone jack and high-quality sound. To attract casual players, Mizuguchi wanted his new game to be less daunting to play than his earlier titles Rez and Space Channel 5. Originally, he wanted to make a music-heavy Tetris-style game but problems with licensing led him to create a new concept. Mizuguchi did not consider developing games for the PSP difficult and began working on the game before any PSP software tools were provided. The game's title was derived from "Lumine", meaning to illuminate. The subtitle "Puzzle Fusion" is intended to reflect the mixture of music and gameplay.

The prototype was initially developed on a personal computer (PC) running Microsoft Windows with the specifications of the PSP in mind. During the prototype's development, Katsumi Yokota was mainly a graphic designer and illustrator and considered himself an amateur music composer. He purchased several PC software packages, including FruityLoops and Cubase to assemble loops of electronic music, and Adobe Photoshop to create the visual graphics. Yokota learned about using sound effects while working on Rez, which led him to focus on making sound effects to supplement music for the prototype. He experimented with rhythms that synchronized with the game's time line bar. When deciding game's overall mood, Mizuguchi felt something was missing from the soundtrack and looked for extant external music. While on a mid-year camping trip in Okinawa, he discovered the song "Shinin'" by Shinichi Osawa. The discovery led him to request the implementation synchronized music and visuals. Mizuguchi requested Osawa to include four tracks sequenced with the theme of a party beginning at sunset and ending at sunrise. Osawa contributed the songs "Shinin'", "Shake Ya Body", "I Hear the Music in my Soul", and "Lights".

Yokota initially thought the game's soundtrack would be limited to techno and dance music, and worried the project lacked musical variety. Takayuki Nakamura joined the project as the lead composer after the prototype was completed with Yokota assisting. This was addressed by composing a wider variety of tracks that were based on an understanding of the game's design and considered the final product to be reminiscent of ambient music. Nakamura primarily used Reason and Ableton Live software to compose the songs. His goal for the background music was to feel complete and enjoyable to listen to despite it changing during gameplay. The music and skins were simultaneously developed; the music had to be completed before the skins were finalized. Exceptions were made for the tracks "The SPY loves me" and "Japanese Form", which were directly influenced by Yokota's design. Due to the playing field being 16 columns wide, Nakamura implemented strict rules for the songs to follow 4/4 time signature for them to be synchronized with the time line, resulting in two bars being completed for every time line sweep. He made an exception for the song "Big Elpaso", which alternates between time signatures 5/4 and 3/4, resulting in an average of a 4/4.

On December 12, 2004, Lumines: Puzzle Fusion was published by Bandai and released in Japan as a launch title for the PSP. For North America and Europe, the game was published by Ubisoft and was released on March 23 and September 1, 2005, respectively.

=== Ports ===
Lumines: Puzzle Fusion was ported to multiple platforms, each with its revisions. In September 2005, mobile game publisher Gameloft announced it would release Lumines for mobile phones. Lumines Mobile was released in North America on March 12, 2006, and Europe on May 30. Mobile phone ports exclude Versus mode between players while introducing Arcade mode and Shuffle mode.

By the time ports for additional platforms were released, several sequels and spin-offs had been made available and incorporated new music and gameplay features from those games. Buena Vista Games released a port for the PlayStation 2 (PS2) that was published as Lumines Plus in North America and Europe on February 27 and March 9, 2007, respectively. Lumines Plus added nine songs from Lumines II (2006) but omitted "Shake Ya Body", "I Hear the Music in my Soul", and "Lights" from the original game.

A version for Microsoft Windows was released on November 28, 2007, via WildTangent, and on April 18, 2008, via Steam's network. The WildTangent and Steam versions included Mission and Skin Edit mode, previously introduced in Lumines Live! (2006). The Steam version contains 21 unlockable skins with a sampling of stages for Time Attack, Puzzle, and Mission modes. An "Advance" pack was made available on the same day adding 21 skins, 70 puzzles, and 35 missions to the base game.

=== Lumines Remastered ===
Lumines Remastered
- Nintendo eShop cover art
- Developer: Resonair
- Publisher: Enhance Games
- Director: Eiichiro Ishige
- Producer: Tetsuya Mizuguchi
- Series: Lumines
- Platforms: Nintendo Switch; Windows; PlayStation 4; Xbox One; Amazon Luna; iOS; Android
- Release: WW: June 26, 2018; Amazon Luna: US: October 20, 2020; iOS, Android: WW: July 30, 2026
- Genre: Puzzle
- Modes: Single-player, multiplayer

In March 2018, Mizuguchi, under his new company Enhance Games, announced Lumines Remastered (Note: ルミネス リマスター, Ruminesu Rimasutā) with the Japanese studio Resonair as the developer. It was released later that year on June 26, 2018, for Microsoft Windows, the Nintendo Switch, the PlayStation 4 (PS4), and the Xbox One. Physical versions for PS4 and Nintendo Switch platforms were distributed for a limited time between April 26 to May 10, 2019, via Limited Run Games. The game was made available for cloud gaming on the Amazon Luna streaming platform on October 20, 2020.

Lumines Remastered has enhanced visuals and support for high-resolution systems. It includes the original, Nakamura-composed, high-bitrate music that had been downsampled for the PSP version. Some blocks and visual effects were redesigned. Game director Eiichiro Ishige considers it a remake rather than a remaster. The game retains the game modes of the original with the exclusion of Single Skin mode and includes Mission, Shuffle, and Skin Edit mode introduced in later releases. Mizuguchi did not want to re-release Lumines: Puzzle Fusion unless new features could be implemented. He decided to remaster it after learning about HD Rumble on the Nintendo Switch's Joy-Con game controller and said haptic gameplay features would add something new to Lumines.

The game introduces Trance Vibration, a feature that enables the vibration function with additional controllers in a single-player game. The feature is capable of using up to eight Joy-Con for the Switch, eight Xbox Wireless Controllers for the Xbox One, four DualShock controllers for the PS4, and additional Bluetooth controllers for Microsoft Windows. According to Mizuguchi, the additional controllers provide players with a sense of synesthesia: players can place the controllers on their bodies to experience vibration feedback during gameplay. The vibrations of the additional controllers are synchronized to the rhythm of the game's music.

== Soundtracks ==
Two soundtrack albums based on music from Lumines: Puzzle Fusion were produced. Takayuki Nakamura released a remix album, titled Lumines Remixes on June 9, 2005, on his label Brainstorm. The first disc of the two-disc set has 21 tracks and the second has 19 tracks. The second album, Lumines Remastered Original Soundtrack, (Note: ルミネス リマスター オリジナルサウンドトラック, Ruminesu Rimasutā Orijinaru Saundotorakku) was released digitally on June 26, 2018, as part of a limited-release bundle for PS4 and Steam versions of Lumines Remastered. Limited Run Games made double LP copies available for a limited time on June 26, 2019, as part of a bundle with physical editions of the game for PS4 and Switch.

== Reception ==
=== Original release ===
Reception

Aggregate scores
Aggregator	Score			
Aggregator	mobile	PC	PS2	PSP
GameRankings	87%	N/A	N/A	N/A
Metacritic	N/A	74/100	73/100	89/100

Review scores
Publication	Score			
Publication	mobile	PC	PS2	PSP
1Up.com	A	N/A	A−	A
Computer and Video Games	N/A	N/A	6.5/10	9/10
Edge	N/A	N/A	N/A	8/10
Eurogamer	9/10	N/A	7/10	8/10
G4	N/A	N/A	N/A	5/5
Game Informer	N/A	N/A	7.5/10	9/10
GameDaily	8/10	N/A	9/10	10/10
GamePro	N/A	N/A	2.8/5	4.5/5
GameSpot	N/A	N/A	7/10	9/10
Gamezebo	N/A	5/5 (Note: WildTangent version)	N/A	N/A
IGN	8.8/10	6.8/10 (Note: Steam version)	7/10	8.6/10
PALGN	N/A	N/A	N/A	8.5
PC Gamer (UK)	N/A	80%	N/A	N/A
PC Zone	N/A	73/100	N/A	N/A
Pocket Gamer	3/5	N/A	N/A	4.5/5
USA Today	N/A	N/A	N/A	4/4

Lumines: Puzzle Fusion received "generally favorable" reviews, according to review aggregator website Metacritic. Multiple reviewers praised its combination of music and visuals. GamePro complimented the combination of music and colors, calling it "a mini rave in your hands". GameSpot praised the way the game's sound and visuals correspond to the actions performed. PALGN commended the game's graphic design, saying the menu design and avatars make it distinct. Although PALGN's reviewer did not enjoy the game's music genre, the website still gave a positive review to its soundtrack. Eurogamer deemed the audio superior to the visuals, praising the way the player's actions build the musical elements to a crescendo, and described it as "the real star of the show". IGN provided a more critical assessment, saying the sound and visuals do not have enough interactivity to allow players to feel an impact. Game Informer reviewer felt they reached a trance-like when they felt challenged to find precise and broad tactics.

Reviewers gave the gameplay a positive reception. Pocket Gamer complimented the single-player mode, comparing the quality of the game to class A drugs. IGN praised the gameplay, noting they were attracted to the game design and addicted to unlocking background skins. Computer and Video Games found enjoyment in deciphering ways to place blocks and setting up combos. Edge considered the first playthrough hypnotizing, but found later playthroughs to be sleep-inducing. Edge further praised the additional game modes for strengthening the presentation. G4tv, 1Up.com, GameSpot, Computer and Video Games and PALGN also used the word "addictive" to describe the gameplay.

Lumines: Puzzle Fusion was frequently compared with other tile-matching video games by critics, particularly Tetris. USA Today described the game as a techno-beat Tetris with remix music and flashy graphics. GamePro considered the game as addictive as Tetris and Bejeweled. According to 1Up.com; "Q Entertainment has used the Tetris template to duplicate a lightning-in-a-bottle feeling equal in brilliance and addictiveness to the puzzle classic". GameSpot praised Lumines: Puzzle Fusion as "the greatest Tetris-style puzzle game since Tetris itself".

=== Later releases ===
Lumines Remastered

Aggregate score
Aggregator	Score
Metacritic	80/100 (PS4); 83/100 (Switch); 81/100 (XONE)

Review scores
Publication	Score
GameSpot	8/10 (Switch)
Hardcore Gamer	4.5/5 (PC)
Nintendo Life	9/10 (Switch)
Nintendo World Report	8.5/10 (Switch)
PlayStation Official Magazine – UK	8/10 (PS4)
PC Gamer (US)	85/100 (PC)
PCMag	4.5/5 (Switch)

Award
Publication	Award
Eurogamer	Eurogamer Essential

The mobile phone port Lumines Mobile was also well received by critics. IGN considered it better than the original version because of the new features. 1Up.com, also praised the new features and considered it almost a sequel, and Eurogamer said the new features helped place it among the best mobile games. GameDaily called it one of the best puzzle games ever made and said it almost perfectly complements the original. Multiple reviewers responded negatively to the sound quality but most said the game's overall quality outweighed it. GameDaily praised the music but criticized the way it operates independently of the gameplay. Pocket Gamer criticized the on-screen visuals obscuring the background artwork and concluded the sound does not do justice to the Lumines concept.

Lumines Plus for PS2 received "mixed or average" reviews according to Metacritic. GameDaily complimented the game, stating that it retained its predecessor's addictive play. Game Informer thought the visuals were less vibrant and noticed five seconds of silence between level transitions. The magazine concluded it was the least-impressive title in the Lumines series. 1Up.com also criticized the intermittent silence between stages and expressed disappointment that songs from the original were missing. However, they praised the addition of skins from Lumines Live and Lumines II, calling it a "Lumines greatest hits". IGN was disappointed by the absence of new features, and said the "Plus" moniker is misleading, and would have preferred it to have the animated backgrounds and game modes introduced in Lumines II. Eurogamer criticized the absence of songs from the original and said the new track selections make the game too arduous to play. GameSpot also noted the missing tracks but said the remaining Japanese tracks compensate for their absence. GamePro did not deem the game fun and said the music distracts from the gameplay. Computer and Video games shared similar complaints to IGN and Eurogamer and called attention to the unused portions of the television screen, however, they considered the audio infinitely better than the original and almost makes up for their grievances.

For the PC ports, Gamezebo praised the WildTangent version for its simple gameplay and for not adding too many new gameplay power-ups. PC Gamer UK complimented the game for being free but not for requiring to watch an ad before playing. PC Gamer UK found some levels ugly and didn't enjoy replaying from the beginning to unlock more skins. When reviewing the Steam version, IGN criticized it for being split into two paid packages and was disappointed for not adding an online leaderboard or online functionality to multiplayer and considered those features vital to a PC release. PC Zone had complaints about select stages having backgrounds indistinguishable from the blocks and did not consider Advance Pack downloadable content worth the purchase.

When reviewing Lumines Remastered, critics reacted positively. PCMag complimented the game and said it is as addictive and hypnotic as the original. Nintendo World Report noted the Trance Vibration feature working as advertised and called it "genius". Hardcore Gamer praised the music as enjoyable. GameSpot noted the Nintendo Switch version of the game looks better than prior handheld releases due to its cleaner animation but said it is not the best-looking game in the series. Eurogamer called the Switch version "euphoric", comparing the rumble feature to Mizuguchi's previous endeavor with Rez's trance vibrator. Nintendo Life said the songs vary in quality and that each is catchy in their way. The reviewer also complimented the visuals for being vibrant and full of animation without detracting from the gameplay. Despite having an overall positive response, some reviewers were disappointed in the absence of introducing an online multiplayer feature.

=== Sales and awards ===
Lumines: Puzzle Fusion won several awards, including the 2005 Spike TV Video Game Award for Best Handheld Game, GameSpot's 2005 PSP Game Of The Year, and Electronic Gaming Monthly's 2005 Handheld Game Of The Year. IGN awarded the game for Best Puzzle, Best Artistic Design, and Best Original Score. It was awarded for Best Audio at the 4th Annual G.A.N.G. Awards. Lumines: Puzzle Fusion also appeared on Game Informer's "Top 50 Games of 2005" list" and Play ranked it the second-best PSP game in its "2005 Year in Review". GamesRadar+ ranked the game as the sixth-best launch game of all time and Paste ranked it 12th-best. The mobile phone version was nominated for the Edge Mobile Awards at the 2006 Edinburgh Interactive Entertainment Festival. During the 9th Annual Interactive Achievement Awards, the Academy of Interactive Arts & Sciences nominated Lumines for "Outstanding Achievement in Gameplay Engineering".

In 2005, Tetsuya Mizuguchi reported a sale of 180,000 units in Europe, 300,000 in North America, and 70,000 in Japan, totaling over half a million sales. On June 23, 2007, Amazon sales of the game increased by 5,900% within 24 hours due to hackers discovering a bug within the game, allowing them to install any program onto the PSP, including homebrew software. Sony released an update to prevent the exploit six days after its discovery.

== Sequels and follow-ups ==
Lumines: Puzzle Fusion was followed by multiple spin-offs and sequels, becoming the first entry in the Lumines series. The first set of sequels, Lumines II and Lumines Live!, were developed at the same time. Lumines Live! introduces Mission Mode, Skin Edit mode, and an online multiplayer feature. It was released digitally on Xbox 360 via Xbox Live; its distribution began in Europe on October 18, 2006. Lumines II includes the new features introduced in Lumines Live!, Sequencer mode, and music videos from Black Eyed Peas, Gwen Stefani, and Hoobastank. It was made available for the PSP in North America on November 6, 2006.

The games were followed by Lumines Supernova, which adds a Dig Down mode but excludes online multiplayer. Supernova game was released for PlayStation 3 via the PlayStation Network on December 18, 2008. An iOS game called Lumines: Touch Fusion was made for touch controls; it has the same features as the original except for the Versus modes. It was released on August 27, 2009. A follow-up called Lumines: Electronic Symphony was released on the PlayStation Vita in Japan on April 19, 2012. The PlayStation Vita version renamed some of the modes and adds new features. Another mobile release titled Lumines: Puzzle & Music, was released on July 19, 2016, for iOS and Android.

Lumines Arise is the latest entry in the series, releasing on November 11, 2025 for PlayStation 5 and Steam. It features online multiplayer, a return of Dig Down mode, and supports PlayStation VR2 and PC-compatible VR headsets.
