= Takayuki Nakamura =

Japanese musical composer

Takayuki Nakamura 中村隆之
- Born: July 19, 1967 (age 59); Tokyo, Japan
- Genres: Chiptune; rock; jazz fusion; electronic; ambient; video game music
- Occupations: Composer; musician
- Instrument: Keyboards
- Years active: 1989–present

Takayuki Nakamura (中村隆之, Nakamura Takayuki; born July 19, 1967) is a Japanese video game music composer and musician, who worked at Sega from 1989 to 1996 and contributed to games such as OutRunners and the Virtua Fighter series. After leaving in 1996, he joined Dream Factory and composed for Tobal 2 and Ehrgeiz. He founded the music production company Brainstorm Co. Ltd. in 1999, where he has most notably worked on the Lumines series and Rodea the Sky Soldier.

== Biography ==
Nakamura was raised in a household that actively listened to music. During elementary school, he recorded songs from the radio and make his own mix tapes. After becoming a middle school student, he started to play the guitar, being inspired by artists such as Toto and Van Halen. During his high school years he got into jazz artists such as Keith Jarrett, Chick Corea, and Sadao Watanabe. He started a T-Square cover band with friends at college; as he was studying business, he did not get any musical education, but still wanted to pursue a career in music. He worked part-time jobs to raise money for music equipment, purchasing a Roland MC-300 sequencer. This led to him applying as a composer for game companies.

Nakamura worked part-time at Sega in 1989 on the Sega Genesis version of Michael Jackson's Moonwalker. He recalls transcribing Michael Jackson's song "Bad" into MML and also composed a boss battle theme from scratch. He also composed for ESWAT: City Under Siege and Columns II along with senior composer Y. Takada. He joined as a full-time composer in 1990, and composed for games such as the Genesis version of Dick Tracy and the Master System version of Michael Jackson's Moonwalker. He also worked on sound programming for games such as Streets of Rage. Along with Takenobu Mitsuyoshi and Hiroshi Kawaguchi, Nakamura composed for OutRunners, which he found exciting due to it being a sequel to the popular OutRun, as well as being able to compose entirely using sampled instruments on the MultiPCM chip. Shortly after, he composed for Virtua Fighter. Although there was pressure at the company for the game to surpass Street Fighter II, he did not take much inspiration from its music, and found it challenging to output good sound from the cabinet speakers. This also led to him composing for Virtua Fighter 2 with Mitsuyoshi and Akiko Hashimoto.

Following his work on Virtua Fighter 3 with Mitsuyoshi and Fumio Ito, Nakamura left Sega in 1996 and joined Dream Factory. As he had been assigned to management roles at Sega, he felt that his work at Sega was no longer interesting due to having less time to compose music. This led to him composing the soundtrack for Tobal 2, which encompasses a variety of genres including funk, jazz fusion and rock. He also composed the music for Ehrgeiz, which features a harder sound than of Tobal 2; he found it challenging due to changing his musical approach, as well as working under time constraints. After leaving Dream Factory in 1999, he founded the music production company Brainstorm Co. Ltd. One of the first projects he worked on after becoming independent was Kengo: Master of Bushido. Other composers later joined the company too.

In 2004, Nakamura joined Lumines: Puzzle Fusion as the lead composer following the completion of a prototype. With programmer and additional composer Katsumi Yokota fearing that the soundtrack would lack variety beyond techno and dance music, Nakamura constructed a rich variety of songs based on his understanding of the game's design, and considers his work to resemble ambient music. Nakamura primarily used Reason and Ableton Live software to compose the songs, finding the latter particularly suited for its interactive music. He also composed for Lumines Live! and Lumines II, which received remix albums titled Lumines Remixes Winter and L.II Remixes respectively.

Nakamura composed for the game Rodea the Sky Soldier, which was developed between 2010 and 2011 by Yuji Naka's company Prope, but not released until 2015. Naka initially envisioned the soundtrack to have an orchestral sound, but after Nakamura played a prototype he felt that an acoustic guitar accompaniment would fit well with the concept of dashing in the sky. He split his compositional style for cutscenes and gameplay, as the game features a romantic story.

== Notable works ==
| Year | Title | Notes |
|---|---|---|
| 1990 | Michael Jackson's Moonwalker | Mega Drive version; music with Hiroshi Kubota |
| 1990 | ESWAT: City Under Siege | Music with Y. Takada |
| 1990 | Columns II | Music with Y. Takada |
| 1990 | Dick Tracy | Music |
| 1991 | F1 Exhaust Note | Music |
| 1991 | Astérix | Music |
| 1993 | OutRunners | Music with Takenobu Mitsuyoshi and Hiroshi Kawaguchi |
| 1993 | Virtua Fighter | Music |
| 1994 | Virtua Fighter 2 | Music with Takenobu Mitsuyoshi and Akiko Hashimoto |
| 1995 | Daytona USA | Saturn version; sound director |
| 1996 | Virtua Fighter Kids | Saturn version; music with Takenobu Mitsuyoshi and Maki Morrow |
| 1996 | Virtua Fighter 3 | Music with Takenobu Mitsuyoshi and Fumio Ito |
| 1997 | Tobal 2 | Music |
| 1998 | Ehrgeiz | Music |
| 2000 | Kengo: Master of Bushido | Music |
| 2001 | Guilty Gear Petit | Music |
| 2001 | Guilty Gear Petit 2 | Music |
| 2001 | Kabuki Warriors | Music |
| 2002 | The King of Fighters EX: Neo Blood | Music with Shigeharu Isoda |
| 2002 | WWE Raw | Music |
| 2002 | Sword of the Samurai | Music |
| 2002 | Pinobee | PlayStation version; music |
| 2003 | Tube Slider | Sound director, music with Mitsuteru Furukawa |
| 2003 | Pride FC: Fighting Championships | Music with Hiroshi Utsuyama and Hiroshi Inukai |
| 2003 | Naruto: Ninja Council | Music |
| 2003 | WWE Raw 2 | Music |
| 2004 | Custom Robo | Music |
| 2004 | Kengo 3 | Music |
| 2004 | Lumines | Music with Katsumi Yokota |
| 2005 | Meteos | Music with Kaori Takazoe and Seiji Momoi |
| 2006 | Ninety-Nine Nights | Music with Pinar Toprak, Shingo Yasumoto and Yasuo Kijima |
| 2006 | Lumines Live! | Music with Keiichi Sugiyama and H. Ueda |
| 2006 | Custom Robo Arena | Music with Shingo Yasumoto, Kenzi Nagashima, and Tsubasa Waga |
| 2006 | Gunpey DS | Music with Kaori Takazo and Mitsunori Takemoto |
| 2006 | JoJo's Bizarre Adventure: Phantom Blood | Music with Aki Ota, Tsubasa Waga, and Satoshi Ariga |
| 2006 | Lumines II | Music |
| 2007 | Lumines Plus | Music |
| 2008 | Populous DS | Music with Keishi Yamamuro and Tsubasa Waga |
| 2008 | Meteos Wars | Music |
| 2008 | Lumines Supernova | Music with Keiichi Sugiyama |
| 2009 | Legends of the Dark King: A Fist of the North Star Story | Music with Tsubasa Waga |
| 2009 | Peggle: Dual Shot | Music with H. Ueda, Keishi Yamamuro, and Kie Harada |
| 2009 | Disney Stitch Jam | Music |
| 2010 | Motto! Stitch! DS Rhythm de Rakugaki Daisakusen | Music with various others |
| 2012 | Family Party: 30 Great Games Obstacle Arcade | Music |
| 2015 | Rodea the Sky Soldier | Music |
| 2017 | Birthdays the Beginning | Music |
| 2017 | The Lost Child | Music |
| 2018 | Lumines Remastered | Music |
| 2019 | Kotodama: The 7 Mysteries of Fujisawa | Music |
| 2019 | Shenmue III | Sound director |
| 2024 | Lollipop Chainsaw RePOP | Music with Shuichiro Fukuhiro, Kenta Kawamura, and Secheol Shin |
