= Shuji Utsumi =

Japanese business executive and video game producer; president and COO of Sega

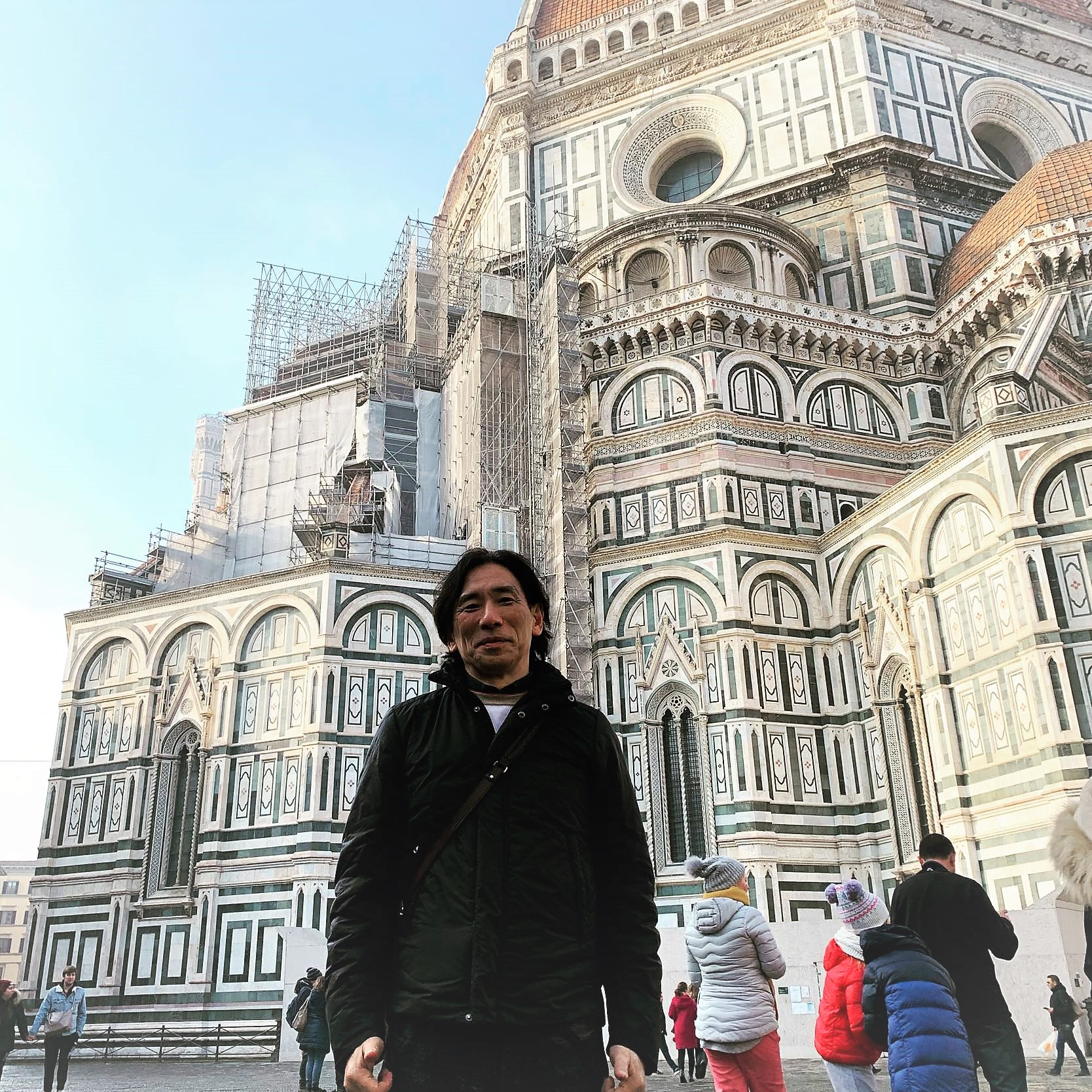
- Utsumi in Italy, 2020
- Born: April 19, 1961 (age 65)
- Education: Hitotsubashi University (BA); Wharton School (MBA)
- Occupations: Business executive; video game producer
- Years active: 1986–present
- Organization(s): Sega (President and COO)

Shuji Utsumi (内海州史, Utsumi Shuji; born April 19, 1961) i is a Japanese business executive and video game producer who has been president and COO (chief operating officer) of Sega since April 2024. He is also CEO of Sega of America and Sega Europe. Utsumi previously held senior roles at Sony Computer Entertainment America (SCEA), Sega of America, and Disney Interactive, and co-founded the Tokyo-based game studio Q Entertainment.

== Career ==
Utsumi began his games industry career in 1993 as one of the founding members of SCEA, as Vice President of product acquisition and working on third-party relations during the launch of the original PlayStation.

In 1996 he moved to Sega of America as Senior Vice President, working with Sega’s Japan studios during the late-1990s and Dreamcast period.

From 2000 to 2004 Utsumi was vice president and managing director for the Asia-Pacific region at Disney Interactive. He has spoken about securing corporate approval for Kingdom Hearts, as a Disney-side producer on the project.

In 2003 Utsumi co-founded Q Entertainment with designer Tetsuya Mizuguchi and became its CEO. The studio is best known for the music-driven titles Lumines and Meteos and for later projects such as Rez HD and Child of Eden.

Outside video games, Utsumi was appointed president and COO of Warner Music Japan in 2014, and later became president (2016) and subsequently CEO (2018) of mobile game developer Cybird during its acquisition by Aeria Inc.

Utsumi rejoined SegaSammy in 2019 and became CSO of Sega in 2020, later Co-COO, and in April 2024 was promoted to president and COO of Sega while also CEO of Sega of America and Sega Europe. Since then, independent coverage has profiled his strategy to balance legacy IP with new concepts and transmedia initiatives, as Sega pursues revivals such as Crazy Taxi and Jet Set Radio.

== Education ==
Utsumi holds an MBA from the Wharton School of the University of Pennsylvania and a bachelor’s degree in economics from Hitotsubashi University.
