= Lumines Supernova =

2008 video game

- Developer: Q Entertainment
- Publisher: Q Entertainment
- Director: Katsumi Yokota
- Designer: Tetsuya Mizuguchi
- Series: Lumines
- Platform: PlayStation 3
- Release: JP: December 18, 2008; NA: December 23, 2008; PAL: February 5, 2009
- Genre: Puzzle
- Modes: Single-player, multiplayer

Lumines Supernova (Note: Japanese: ルミネス スーパーノヴァ, Hepburn: Ruminesu sūpānovu~a) is a puzzle video game, the fourth main entry in the Lumines series. It was published and developed by Q Entertainment with original series creator Tetsuya Mizuguchi as the game designer and Katsumi Yokota as director. The game was released on the PlayStation Network in December 2008 for Japan and North America.

The objective of the game is to arrange 2×2 blocks varying between two colors into same-colored squares by moving them, rotating, and dropping them in a 16×10 playing field while a timeline sweeps from left to right and clears the completed squares and awards points to the players. It features all of the previous game modes that Lumines Live! implemented except for online multiplayer, as well as an expanded version of the Sequencer from Lumines II and a new mode, DigDown Mode.

Lumines Supernova was received positively among reviewers, with some adding it to their top-rated lists. However, the game was criticized for the lack of online multiplayer that was previously introduced in the series.

== Gameplay ==
Screenshot of Lumines Supernova's DigDown mode

Lumines Supernova's gameplay has remained largely the same as its predecessors in the Lumines series with new features. The objective of the game is to rotate and move 2×2 blocks varying between two colors onto a 16×10 playing field to create squares of 2×2 of matching color or larger. A vertical line known as the "Time Line" sweeps across the playing field from left to right and erases the matching colored squares, awarding points to the player's total score. The game is lost when the blocks reach the top of the playing field. The core game modes from the series return: Challenge mode, Time Attack Mode, and Puzzle mode. In Challenge mode, players unlock skins by continuously playing through each level. In time Attack mode, players must clear as many matching colored squares as possible under a time limit. In puzzle mode, players need to use the 2×2 blocks to create a specific shape.

Features previously introduced from Lumines Live! and Lumines II return in Lumines Supernova: Skin Edit mode and Mission mode. Skin Edit mode allows players to create a playlist of Skins previously unlocked in Challenge mode. Mission mode players must complete specific tasks. The Sequencer option was originally introduced in Lumines II but didn't appear in Lumines Live returns in this game. The sequencer allows players to create their original background music and sound effects from one of four unique base music types. With each base music, Players can save up to 20 original music sequences with each base music used. They can also be ported up to four skins into Skin Edit Mode and more skins including Sackboys and the Sackgirls from LittleBigPlanet.

Lumines Supernova introduces DigDown Mode. DigDown Mode is a timed mode where the playing field is automatically filled with blocks and the player's objective is to dig down to the bottom of the playing field by creating colored squares. The stage is completed when two adjacent columns are cleared and a new stage begins with a new set of blocks. Blocks on the playing field and block fall speed increases after each cleared stage.

== Development and release ==
Lumines Supernova was developed by Q Entertainment. The game was directed by Katsumi Yokota and produced by Tetsuya Mizuguchi. Yokota concentrated on developing Supernova between May and September 2008. Just like Lumines II and Lumines Live!, the graphics for the skins were produced before the songs. During development, Nakamura experimented by adding in more female vocal samples and samples of Nakamura's voice as well. Lumines Supernova was announced on September 4, 2008. On December 18, 2008 Q Entertainment released the game on PlayStation 3 via PlayStation Network in Japan, and in North America five days later.

To promote the game, Q Entertainment released hat and shirt items in PlayStation Home based on the game.

Two packages of downloadable content (DLC) were released for the game. The first DLC package, "Classic Pack", was released in Japan on March 12, 2009, and in North America a month prior. The Classic Pack contains 20 skins that originate from previous Lumines titles. The second DLC package titled, "Winter Holiday Pack" was originally released for a limited time but was bundled together with the Classic Pack in Japan on October 15, 2009 and as a stand-alone release for North America on October 22, 2009.

== Reception ==
Reception

Aggregate score
Aggregator	Score
Metacritic	80/100

Review scores
Publication	Score
Eurogamer	7/10
Gamekult	7/10
GameSpot	8/10
Giant Bomb	3/5
IGN	8.5/10
Jeuxvideo.com	15/20
MeriStation	7.5/10
PlayStation Official Magazine – UK	8/10
Retro Gamer	82%
411Mania	8/10

Lumines Supernova received "favorable" reviews according to the review aggregation website Metacritic.

Common compliments to the game from reviewers were the addition of the DigDown mode and Sequencer. In regards to DigDown mode, Greg Miller of IGN praised it for its challenge. PlayStation Official Magazine – UK reviewer Jonti Davies gave similar praise to DigDown mode noting that it adds a challenge to the standard gameplay, but also considered the total amount of 20 levels to be short. Michael McWhertor of Kotaku appreciated the additions of both DigDown mode and the Sequencer options to the pre-established gameplay and noted they add new ways to look at the same gameplay. GameSpot reviewer, Mitch Dyer, didn't consider the new mode as enjoyable as the main game but found it to be a nice change of pace. Christian Donlan of Eurogamer found the DigDown mode enjoyable to play for an hour but noted that it lacked replay value after completion.

The lack of online multiplayer and new features was a common complaint among reviewers. Miller criticized the recycled content from previous games and noted the game could've had more original content. Although Miller recognizes online leaderboards and ways to track stats, he would've preferred it replaced with online multiplayer. Dyer recognized the online multiplayer component not vital to enjoy the game, but still considered its absence disappointing. Jeff Gerstmann of Giant Bomb also commented on the lack of online multiplayer but didn't consider it a significant loss due to not enjoying it in its predecessor, Lumines Live!.

IGN listed it in their Top 25 PlayStation Games, Top 10 PlayStation Network Exclusive Games, and was the Runner up to the website's Game of the Month for December 2008. Playmania ranked the game in 4th place on their seven most favorite puzzle games. Game Informer recommended the game, and noted it compiled the best features from its predecessor and adding new gameplay mode.
