= Lumines: Puzzle & Music =

2016 video game

- Developers: Mobcast; Resonair
- Publisher: Mobcast
- Producer: Tetsuya Mizuguchi
- Series: Lumines
- Platforms: iOS, Android
- Release: September 1, 2016
- Genre: Puzzle
- Modes: Single-player, multiplayer

Lumines: Puzzle & Music (Note: Japanese: LUMINES パズル&ミュージック, Hepburn: Ruminesu Pazuru & Myūjikku) is a puzzle game for iOS and Android, developed and published by Mobcast with Resonair as co-developer. It was the second smartphone game in the Lumines series after Lumines: Touch Fusion. The objective is to rotate and drop 2×2 blocks to create squares of the same color as a vertical line sweeps across the board to erase completed squares and award points to the player. It was soft launched in Japan, Australia, and New Zealand on July 19, 2016, before being fully released worldwide on September 1, 2016.

Creator of the Lumines series, Tetsuya Mizuguchi, decided to work with Mobcast and Resonair after discovering the previous rights holder, Q Entertainment, had quit the video game business. Mobcast was responsible for developing the game and Resonair provided visual concepts. The game received downloadable content in the form of albums, a freemium version titled Lumines: Puzzle & Music Neo, and a lite version for Facebook. It was well-received by critics with praise focused on the touch controls, songs, and visuals while also criticizing the amount of content in the initial release of the game. Distribution of Lumines: Puzzle & Music ended on March 17, 2020.

== Gameplay ==
Gameplay of Lumines: Puzzle & Music featuring Single Skin mode.

Lumines: Puzzle & Music is a tile-matching puzzle game. Stages are composed of a 12×10 playing field with a series of 2×2 blocks varying between two-color blocks falling from the top of the playing field. The game is played using the touchscreen interface of the players' smartphone devices. Players can move the blocks left or right by swiping towards its corresponding direction on the screen, tap it to rotate, and swipe downward to drop the block instantly. A vertical line known as a "Time Line" sweeps across the playing field from left to right and erases any 2×2 squares it touches. The goal is to manipulate the blocks to create 2×2 squares of the same color in order for the time line to erase them and grant points. Multiple squares can be combined and share the same blocks. Two special blocks exist in the game: Shuffle and Chain. Shuffle blocks randomize any group of blocks in the playing field that it touches. Chain blocks link any adjacent blocks of the same color together, allowing them to be erased by the Time Line without needing to create a square. There are two game modes: Album mode where players can play a set of tracks, and Single Skin mode where players can choose a Skin and play it endlessly. Time Attack mode was introduced on March 2, 2017. In Time Attack mode, players attempt to reach the highest possible score within 90 seconds.

== Development and release ==
In March 2014, concept creator of the Lumines series, Tetsuya Mizuguchi, resigned from Q Entertainment. After leaving the company, Mizuguchi learned Q Entertainment quit the video game business which led him to approach Mobcast and Resonair in co-developing a new Lumines title for smartphones. In January 2015, the rights to both Lumines and Meteos were acquired by Mobcast, which announced the development of a new Lumines mobile game. The rights for Lumines were originally intended to be moved to Enhance Games but was instead transferred to Resonair. The game was originally titled Lumines 2016 but was later officially named Lumines: Puzzle & Music. Mizuguchi served as producer and supervisor of the game; Eiichiro Ishige, who also left Q Entertainment, provided concepts for visuals as part of Resonair while Mobcast was responsible for programming the game. Both Mizuguchi and Eiichiro chose to have the game be vertical-oriented instead of horizontal based on feedback from player testers. Mobcast spent seven months refining the touch controls on the game including swipe speed, angle, distance, and hold times.

Lumines Puzzle & Music soft launched on iOS and Android on July 12, 2016, in Japan, New Zealand, and Australia and was fully released on September 1, 2016, worldwide. The initial game includes two albums, one composed of eight new songs and the other of six songs from the original game, including Mondo Grosso's "Shinin'". Another Lumines mobile title, a free-to-play entry titled Lumines Vs. was scheduled to release in the 4th quarter of 2016 but no news came after its announcement. Instead, a freemium version of Puzzle & Music titled Lumines: Puzzle & Music Neo (Note: LUMINES パズル&ミュージック NEO, Ruminesu pazuru & myūjikku Neo) was released on November 21, 2016. The freemium version included the "Rez Pack" playlist made up of six songs from the original Rez video game. A lite version of the game was made available worldwide on Facebook Instant Games on December 26, 2016. Distribution of both the paid and freemium versions of the game ended on March 17, 2020.

Additional playlist packs were released for purchase. On September 9, 2016, Mobcast released the "Ultra Japan Pack" playlist which contained songs that were performed on Ultra Japan of 2016. On November 16, 2016, Mobcast released the "Sekai No Owari Pack" playlist containing five songs from the band Sekai no Owari. On March 30, 2017, Mobcast released the "Retro Game Remix Pack" playlist which contained remix songs from Xevious, Pac-Man, and Tower of Druaga as a collaboration with Bandai Namco.

== Reception ==
Reception

Aggregate score
Aggregator	Score
Metacritic	84/100

Review scores
Publication	Score
Pocket Gamer	4/5
TouchArcade	4/5
Hardcore Gamer	4/5
Gamezebo	5/5
DigitallyDownloaded.net	4/5

Luminess: Puzzle & Music was received positively among critics. It received an aggregated score of 84 out of 100 based on six reviews. Pocket Gamer praised the game for maintaining the experience as its predecessors despite using a free-to-play business model, calling it "solid" and "dependable". Hardcore Gamer complimented the visuals, music, and for its transitioning into smartphones. However, Hardcore Gamer also gave criticism the touch controls on the game still had a delay and would have preferred the ability to use a game controller. TouchArcade compared the game to its predecessor Lumines Touch Fusion, noting that both versions had good music, however, Puzzle & Music had better controls than Touch Fusion. DigitallyDownloaded.net praised the gameplay for being able to be played in short sessions.

A common criticism is the amount of content the game has. TouchArcade criticized the number of game modes but ultimately praised the game stating it would be unrealistic for wanting more. Both Gamezebo and DigitallyDownloaded.net were disappointed in this but remained hopeful for future downloadable content.
