= Lumines Arise =

2025 video game

- Developers: Enhance Games; Monstars Inc.
- Publisher: Enhance Games
- Director: Takashi Ishihara
- Producers: Tetsuya Mizuguchi; Mark McDonald
- Composers: Hydelic; Takako Ishida
- Series: Lumines
- Engine: Unity
- Platforms: PlayStation 5; Windows
- Release: November 11, 2025
- Genre: Puzzle
- Modes: Single-player, multiplayer

Lumines Arise is a 2025 puzzle video game developed by Enhance Games and Monstars Inc. and published by Enhance Games for PlayStation 5 and Windows. It is a falling block puzzle game where 2x2 blocks of different colors fall down to the floor and creating 2x2 colored squares of the same color or greater allows the timeline to clear the colored squares from left to right in sync with the song's BPM. Each stage has unique block colors and textures, backgrounds, visual effects, sound effects, and a unique song to go with it.

The game is inspired by Enhance Games' previous title, Tetris Effect, and the main single-player mode, titled Journey, features over 35 stages called "skins". It also features other modes such as a live 1v1 versus mode titled Burst Battle, 60 training missions and 25 with unique game mechanics in the Missions hub, and more. Lumines Arise also has VR support with spatial audio for headphones.

Lumines Arise was released on November 11, 2025, becoming the first title in the series since 2018's Lumines Remastered, and the first new title since 2012's Lumines: Electronic Symphony. The game received positive reviews from critics, with most reviewers praising the game's Journey mode, presentation, graphics, gameplay, soundtrack, and new game modes. Some reviewers found the graphics' high rate of motion in some skins to be overwhelming or distracting, with others not bothered by it.

== Gameplay ==
The first skin from Lumines Arise's Journey mode.

Lumines Arise is a falling block puzzle game that carries the core gameplay of previous games in the Lumines series, where 2x2 blocks of 2 different colors fall from the top of the screen and players move, rotate, or drop the blocks to the floor. The objective is to clear blocks by creating 2x2 colored blocks of the same color or greater, referred to as squares. The created colored squares will stay on hold until the vertical "timeline" sweeps across the board from left to right in sync with the song's BPM and clears the colored squares. The faster the song's BPM, the more fast paced the timeline and gameplay is. If a falling block lands directly on 2 blocks at the highest point on the board, the player tops out and the game ends.

Clearing 4 or more colored squares in a single timeline sweep will award a "bonus" awarding extra points. It starts at 4x and if more bonuses in a row are achieved, the bonus will multiply by four up to 16x. Maintaining a "combo" of bonuses is a very effective way of gaining points due to the multiplier and demands a high level of skill to maintain the combo for longer.

Occasionally, a chain block may appear on one of the blocks and connects to blocks of the same color horizontally or vertically. The timeline sweeps and clears these connected blocks making the chain block effective in certain situations, such as when the board is piling up or creating lots of colored squares once the connected blocks have been cleared.

The game is easy to learn but hard to master due to the abstract nature of the game's simple rules. Factors such as how the 2x2 blocks are placed, how many colored squares are formed from a single 2x2 block, how the stack will look like once colored squares are cleared by the timeline, how the upcoming 2x2 blocks affect the situation, how keeping the stack clean provides open spaces for new colored squares to be formed, the speed of the timeline, and gaining combos, all form part of the gameplay's abstract nature.

=== Burst mechanic ===
The "Burst" mechanic in Lumines Arise shown. A giant expanding square, alongside the countdown on top of the timeline, and the blocks of opposite color on hold are shown.

A new addition to the gameplay is the new "Burst" mechanic. Similar to the Zone mechanic in Tetris Effect, players build up a percentage located on top of the timeline and can be activated by pressing the Burst button once it's over 50%. When Burst is activated, blocks of the same color of the expanding squares become invincible to being cleared by a number of sweeps shown as a countdown on top of the timeline until the number reaches 0. The higher the percentage on top the timeline before Burst is activated, the higher the countdown number. This gives players more time in Burst.

In Burst, players expand a square of the same color of increasing margins by attaching blocks of the same color around it. When blocks of the same color are completely around 2 sides of the expanding square, the square expands. Other expanding squares can also be formed, though if the largest square expands, it will take the blocks required for expansion from others to expand. Expanding the largest growing square is the best way of gaining points during Burst.

Blocks of the opposite color that's adjacent to created colored squares of any color will be put on hold at the top of the board for the remainder of Burst timeline sweeps. Some of these blocks can also do so randomly.

When the countdown on top of the timeline reaches 0, Burst ends and the timeline sweeps through the squares and then the blocks of opposite color on hold will then fall down on the board, awarding lots of points.

== Game modes ==
=== Journey ===
Journey is the main single player game mode in Lumines Arise and it features over 35 stages called "skins". Each skin carries a unique theme and song to it and the sound effects flow alongside the music and visuals, creating a sound stage that's unique for games of its genre.

Each skin lasts until 70 or 90 squares are cleared. Unlike previous games in the series, once a skin is completed, the gameplay will halt during a transition to the next skin, then gameplay will resume in the next skin.

There are 9 areas consisting of 4-5 skins each in Journey mode and when an area is cleared, a checkpoint will occur allowing players the choice to continue playing and build their score, or to stop playing and continue some other time, though this will save the score as is and starts at 0 the next time they play.

==== Survival ====
If Journey is completed, a new game mode called Survival is unlocked. The gameplay is otherwise identical to Journey, except that it only ends when players top out, and there's no checkpoints. This makes Survival a run-based game mode similar to older games in the series like Challenge mode in Lumines: Puzzle Fusion and Voyage mode in Lumines: Electronic Symphony.

=== Burst Battle ===
The Burst Battle game mode in Lumines Arise shown. Garbage blocks are seen on the sides of the boards and impending blocks are shown where they will land by pink indicators on the board.

Lumines Arise features a live 1-vs-1 game mode titled Burst Battle, and can be played locally or online. Unlike previous versus game modes in the series, where two players share a single 16x10 board with a divider in the middle they must push to the opponent's side by clearing more squares than them, Burst Battle gives both players their own 16x10 board to utilize, making it more similar to other puzzle game's versus modes like modern Tetris and Puyo Puyo. Burst Battle is a round-based win format, and if a player tops out, the other player wins a round.

The main objective of Burst Battle is to send garbage blocks to the opponent by clearing squares and gaining combos. Unlike other games of its genre, where garbage blocks rise from the bottom or fall from the top, the garbage blocks land on the horizontal sides of the board from the top, and as more blocks are at the sides of the board, the garbage blocks fall closer to the center, crowding useable space in a player's board.

Garbage blocks pile up as a queue until the player drops a falling 2x2 block to the floor after a set period of drops, then the garbage blocks fall to the board. A player can defend against an impending garbage block queue by clearing squares to remove garbage blocks from the queue, and as long as the garbage block queue is fully cleared, they're able to attack the opponent with garbage blocks. Garbage blocks on the board can be cleared by creating colored squares adjacent to garbage blocks.

The Burst mechanic retains its functions in Burst Battle, adding another layer of gameplay mechanics to Burst Battle. As explained before, players build up a percentage at the top of the timeline and the higher the percentage, the more timeline sweeps blocks of one color are invincible too.

Expanding large squares during Burst send garbage blocks once Burst ends and the large squares are swept, and the larger the expanded square, the more garbage blocks are sent. The amount of garbage blocks sent can be massive if the expanded square is really large, making the Burst mechanic an effective way of sending and defending against garbage blocks.

=== Training Missions ===
Lumines Arise has 60 training missions that help new and experienced players get better at the game or refresh them on the game's mechanics. The missions include various tasks for players to complete such as getting an all clear from the specified blocks in queue or clearing a defined number of colored squares of a specific color. The missions get harder as one progresses through the 60 missions.

=== Challenges ===
If Journey mode is completed, Challenges are unlocked which twist the gameplay of Lumines Arise in many ways. Located within the Missions hub, 25 challenges contain unique game mechanics such as falling blocks of different sizes, gaining combos for an objective, pre-made block template's that players have to clear, falling blocks from the top, among others. All challenges have an objective to clear, such as clearing a number of squares, completing an objective within a set time, and more.

=== Dig Down ===
Dig Down is a survival based game mode in Lumines Arise. In it, blocks rise from the bottom, getting faster as one survives for longer, creating pressure on players to clear blocks faster. Players play on a single skin in Dig Down with increasing difficulty until the player tops out, where the player's time survived is the score.

=== Time Attack ===
Similar to previous games in the series, Time Attack's main goal is to clear as many colored squares as possible within the set time limit.

== Development ==
Lumines Arise was announced on June 4, 2025 in Sony's Interactive Entertainment's State of Play presentation as the first title to be shown. The game's production was overseen by executive producer Tetsuya Mizuguchi, game and art director Takashi Ishihara, and creative producer Mark McDonald, and the soundtrack was produced by Hydelic and Takako Ishida who previously worked on the soundtracks of Tetris Effect and Rez Infinite.

== Reception ==
Reception

Aggregate scores
Aggregator	Score
Metacritic	PC: 87/100; PS5: 87/100
OpenCritic	97% recommend

Review score
Publication	Score
Famitsu	8/10, 8/10, 8/10, 7/10

Lumines Arise received "generally favorable reviews" from critics, according to review aggregator website Metacritic. Fellow review aggregator OpenCritic assessed that the game received "mighty" approval, and was recommended by 97% of critics. In Japan, four critics from Famitsu gave the game a total score of 31 out of 40.

=== Awards ===
Year	Award	Category	Result	Ref.
2026	15th New York Game Awards	Coney Island Dreamland Award for Best AR/VR Game	Won	
2026	15th New York Game Awards	Tin Pan Alley Award for Best Music in a Game	Nominated	
2026	29th Annual D.I.C.E. Awards	Family Game of the Year	Nominated	
2026	29th Annual D.I.C.E. Awards	Outstanding Achievement in Audio Design	Nominated	
2026	44th Annual Golden Joystick Awards	Best Soundtrack	Nominated	
