= Every Extend =

Video game series

- E3 European cover art
- Genres: Puzzle, shoot 'em up
- Developers: Kanta Matsuhisa (E2); Q Entertainment (E3 & E4); Sonic Blue (E4)
- Publishers: Every Extend Extra; JP Bandai Namco Games; NA/PAL Buena Vista Games; Every Extend Extra Extreme; Q Entertainment
- Platforms: Windows, PSP, Xbox 360
- First release: Every Extend; March 29, 2004
- Latest release: Every Extend Extra Extreme; October 17, 2007

Every Extend (Note: Eburi ekusutendo (エブリ・エクステンド)) is series of puzzle shoot 'em up video games primarily developed by Q Entertainment. The series began with a 2004 freeware game of the same name (also known as E2) for Windows, which was a personal project by Kanta Matsuhisa under the "Omega" pseudonym. Q Entertainment discovered the game online and approached Matshisa to develop a remix version. The remix version was developed for the PlayStation Portable and was released in 2006, titled Every Extend Extra (Note: Eburi ekusutendo ekusutora (エブリ・エクステンド・エクストラ)) (or E3). In 2007, Q Entertainment developed and released a sequel on the Xbox 360 titled Every Extend Extra Extreme (Note: Eburi ekusutendo ekusutora ekusutorīmu (エブリ・エクステンド・エクストラ・エクストリーム)) (or E4).

== Gameplay ==
Xbox 360 version gameplay screenshot

In Every Extend, players control a ship with the only ability to detonate itself. Stages begin with a set time limit and enemies appearing on screen in randomized patterns. When the player detonates their ship and an enemy is caught in its blast radius, the enemy will explode and have its own blast radius that other enemies can get caught in, causing a chain reaction. The goal is to destroy the maximum number of ships on screen by positioning and detonating at the right moment, setting off a chain reaction of explosions and earning combo bonus. The first enemy in a chain is worth 10 points and each successive blast doubles in value up to a maximum of 2560 points. Blowing oneself up takes away from one's overall 'stock' of lives. Additional lives are gained after a certain number of points have been obtained. The requirement to obtain lives increases after each new life gained.

Green enemies drop point bonus items that begin at 800 points, and if collected continuously without detonating or losing a life, they increase by an additional 800 points. Pink enemies drop quickens which raises the speed of enemies and spawn rate. Mini-bosses drop yellow items that grants 10-second time extensions. If the ship is destroyed without detonating, the player receives a 5-second penalty. Pulse bombs don't drop items or bonus but instead charge and detonate a wider range than normal once defeated. If the player runs out of lives or time, they lose the game

In Every Extend Extra and Every Extend Extra Extreme, each stage has its own unique music, background, enemy design, and bosses. It also adds varying explosion types to the Every Extend template, which can link chains in different ways, as well as a "charge" feature. By holding down the explosion button, players can charge the bomb; the longer the button is held, the larger the blast radius, expanding the possibility for chaining explosions. Quickens dropped by enemies increase the speed of both the player and the enemy, as well as the speed of that stage's music. Each stage is played out to a time limit, with a boss character appearing at a set point towards the end. Rather than attacking the boss directly, the player relies on destroying the required number of regular enemies near the boss to cause a 'hit'.

=== Modes ===
There are two modes in Every Extend: Light mode and Heavy mode. Light mode is easier and has a single boss at the end of the stage named "AKR-I-C-E". Heavy mode is more difficult and offers a boss named "KW MOTOR". An alternative boss named "A-BA HEDRON" can be encountered if the player manages to collect seven quickens, have over 5 lives remaining and accumulated over 800,000 points. Bosses are required to be defeated using only chain attacks

Every Extend Extra adds four new modes: 'Arcade', 'Caravan', 'Boss Attack', with the original Every Extend labeled as 'Original'. In Arcade mode players must work their way through the stage and defeat the boss at the end in order to move on to the next stage. Arcade mode is made up of seven stages as well as two special hidden stages. In Caravan, players can choose from any of the stages that were previously unlocked in Arcade mode and compete for a high score. Boss Attacks has two modes: Solo and Rush. In Solo, players can face-off against a single boss. In Rush, players can battle one after another until all the bosses are defeated.

Every Extend Extra Extreme comes in four main modes: 'E4: The Game Unlimited', 'E4: The Game Time Limited', 'S4: Wiz Ur Muzik', and 'R4: The Revenge'. E4: The Game Unlimited and E4: The Game Time Limited are the two main game modes. In "Unlimited", players can play as long as they want so long as they keep gaining lives, and extending time. In "Time Limited", players cannot extend time. In "S4: Wiz Ur Muzik" players can choose their own music stored in the Xbox 360 hard drive. In 'R4: The Revenge' players have the ability to shoot projectiles and attacking enemies directly, however the only hit that will count towards destroying the player is the green circle. Players can choose their movement speed and one of two modes of firing prior to the start of the game, "Four Way", and "Spread". Four way shoots projectiles from all points of your character, and Spread shoots projectiles from one specific point of your character. Players are tasked with destroying a set number of enemies until they encounter the "Boss Enemy". Destroying any enemy will give players slight amounts of "Level" which increases the number of projectiles that players can fire by one, to a maximum level of 20. every 25 stages, bosses 1–4 will have an extra one spawn with them, however the fifth boss has increased health instead. The final stage is 100.

Both Every Extend Extra and Every Extend Extra Extreme offer multiplayer modes. Every Extend Extra offers multiplayer via PSP's ad-hoc mode and Every Extend Extra Extreme offers online multiplayer through Xbox Live.

== Development ==
Every Extend was developed by Kanta Matsuhisa. He took inspiration from Tetsuya Mizuguchi's own Rez when developing the game. The game began as a contest entry and took three months for Matsuhisa to develop. Matsuhisa spent the first month using DirectX for the first time and Windows program to draw 3D polygons and exercising model techniques. The next month involved making the prototypes and testing them with Matsuhisa's friends. The third and final month was spent creating finishing parts, making the boss and two levels. During the time developing the game, Matsuhisa was balancing life in college and didn't go to campus much as a result.

A remix version of the game titled Every Extend Extra was announced in Tokyo Game Show 2005. Q Entertainment's Chief Creative Officer Reo Yonaga approached Matsuhisa via email on future plans for the game after the staff of Q Entertainment played the original version on PC. Decision to port the game into PSP was made in 2004 during the time that Lumines was being developed and Matsuhisa joined the development team as a game designer. The game was released as Every Extend Extra was due to adding new graphics, sound effects, gameplay elements, and a new soundtracks from various artists such as USCUS and O-Zone, creating an original game. Every Extend Extra also features the original PC version as well. The PSP version was localized by Buena Vista Games for North American and includes an exclusive soundtrack for one of the bonus levels. Buena Vista Games noted one of the difficulties of localizing the game was translating the names of the levels, bosses, and rankings from the names chosen from Q Entertainment. Namco Bandai released a trial version on PC as part of a contest to promote the game's release. The contest lasted from July 14, 2006, to August 17, 2006.

A sequel to the game was released as Every Extend Extra Extreme for Xbox 360 via Xbox Live Arcade. Tetsuya Mizuguchi described it as a fever version of the game and a sequel to Every Extend Extra. Mizuguchi noted the most difficult thing during development was expanding on the scope of game while trying to confine to a download size that users will deem acceptable. Mizuguchi found it rewarding being able to create new modes and breathe some new life into the game for those who have already played the first game.

=== Releases ===
The Original Every Extend was released for the PC on March 29, 2004, in Japan. The remix version, Every Extend Extra, was released for the PSP in Japan on August 13, 2006, in North America November 7, 2006, in Australia on February 5, 2007, and in Europe on February 9, 2007. The sequel, Every Extend Extra Extreme, was released for the Xbox 360 via Xbox Live Arcade on February 9, 2007, for North America and Japan. The game was re-released into physical form as a compilation by Atari alongside Rez HD and Lumines Live! titled Qubed. The compilation was released on September 19, 2009.

== Reception ==
Aggregate review scores
| Game | GameRankings | Metacritic |
|---|---|---|
| Every Extend Extra | 76.03% | 74% |
| Every Extend Extra Extreme | 76.82% | 78% |

Every Extend Extra was positively received among critics. The game earned an aggregated score of 74 out of 100 on Metacritic based on 45 reviews. Edge magazine awarded the game 8/10 in their October 2006 issue. They cited an obtuse initial learning curve and a "defiant obscurity and the resulting barrier to entry" as its main hindrances, but concluded that, overall, the game was "an undeniably exhilarating dance". Pocket Gamer had also gave the same rating of 8 out of 10, describing the game as "Effortlessly stylish, engagingly simple but deep and beguiling" IGN complimented the game for doing fine job of mixing arcade action with the depth of a serious puzzle game, however noted that it could use more stages and a greater range of difficulty modes." Eurogamer gave similar complaints including their own complaints on the difficulty curve, but gave still gave the game praise, rating it an 8 out of 10 and stating "Every Extend Extra is another triumph of fast-paced puzzle gameplay" GameSpot gave the game a lesser score of 7 out of 10, stating, "concept is kind of interesting, but the novelty wears out after a couple of rounds." However also complimented the game for the ability to grabbing their attention with its outstanding presentation.

Every Extend Extra Extreme was also well received among critics and earned an aggregated score of 78 out of 100 on Metacritic based on 28 reviews. IGN gave the game an 8.5 out of 10, describing the game as "unique" and "trippy". GameSpot gave the game a 7.5 out of 10 complimenting the visuals, stating "It's as much an interactive lightshow as it is a game, and the flashing, spacey visuals in combination with the pulsing, electronic soundtrack make it a hypnotic and singular experience." Eurogamer was more negative towards the game and gave it a 4 out of 10, criticizing how easy it was to get on the top leaderboard and unable to do anything during chains.
