= Meteos Wars =

2008 video game

- Developer: Q Entertainment
- Publisher: Q Entertainment
- Platform: Xbox 360
- Release: December 10, 2008
- Genre: Tile-matching
- Modes: Single-player, multiplayer

Meteos Wars is a tile-matching video game developed and published by Q Entertainment for Xbox Live Arcade. It was released on December 10, 2008, and is a sequel to Meteos. Similar to that game, it requires players to match colored meteos, launching them off the top of the screen to prevent the screen from filling with meteos.

Meteos Wars received mixed reviews from critics, who praised the gameplay and sound, but criticized the online multiplayer element as being sparsely populated and having lag.

== Gameplay ==
Individual meteos fall from the top of the screen, and have to be sent back by arranging them into horizontal or vertical lines of matching threes. They then rocket boost upwards, but may not fully leave the screen unless further power is provided for another rocket boost. As a "competitive meteo-matcher", the player faces an AI or human opponent who is attempting to do the same thing.

== Reception ==
Reception

Aggregate score
Aggregator	Score
Metacritic	71/100

Review scores
Publication	Score
Destructoid	7/10
Eurogamer	7/10
Gamekult	6/10
GameSpot	7/10
Giant Bomb	3/5
IGN	8/10
Jeuxvideo.com	14/20
Official Xbox Magazine (US)	8/10
PALGN	7.5/10
TeamXbox	8.3/10
VideoGamer.com	8/10
411Mania	7.4/10

The game received "mixed or average reviews" according to the review aggregation website Metacritic.

Erik Brudvig of IGN called it "a great puzzle game", but also stated that playing it on a controller was an inferior method to the original handheld version. He stated that while the game "handles well" and is "a lot of fun", as well as looking "snazzy" and sounding "great", he criticized the online play, saying that "few people were playing". He also noted that the online lag "felt like I was moving through molasses". Tom Bramwell of Eurogamer said that while it was a "good game", it was not as "substantial" as games like Lumines Live!, and that the online multiplayer mode had "massive lag". Similarly, Carolyn Petit of GameSpot called the online play a "huge disappointment", but said that it still delivered "hypnotically fast-paced action".
