= Lumines II =

2006 video game

- North American box art
- Developers: Q Entertainment; Bandai
- Publishers: NA/PAL: Buena Vista Games; JP: Namco Bandai Games
- Producer: Tetsuya Mizuguchi
- Designer: Katsumi Yokota
- Composers: Katsumi Yokota; Takayuki Nakamura
- Series: Lumines
- Platform: PlayStation Portable
- Release: NA: November 7, 2006; EU: November 17, 2006; AU: November 23, 2006; JP: February 15, 2007
- Genre: Puzzle
- Modes: Single-player, multiplayer

Lumines II (Note: Japanese: ルミネス II, Hepburn: Ruminesu Tsu) is a 2006 puzzle video game developed by Q Entertainment for the PlayStation Portable (PSP). It was released in November 2006 in the PAL region and North America by Buena Vista Games, and in February 2007 in Japan by Bandai Namco Games. The objective of the game is to move and rotate 2×2 blocks to form colored squares of the same color. Points are awarded to the player when the Time Line erases the colored squares. It serves as a direct sequel to Lumines: Puzzle Fusion, expanding on previous modes from its predecessor and adding new modes such as Mission mode, Skin Edit mode, and Sequencer. Lumines II utilizes songs from its predecessor and introduces music videos as background skins from Japanese music artists and mainstream American music artists such as New Order, Missy Elliott, and Beck.

When developing the game, game producer Tetsuya Mizuguchi intended to make the game have a different atmosphere than its predecessor and wanted to include more songs. Mizuguchi further described the game as a party with him being the organizer. The game was well-received among critics, with most reviewers praising the new features introduced; however, the song selection received a mixed reaction with some reviewers not enjoying the inclusion of American songs, with others welcoming them.

== Gameplay ==
Gameplay of Lumines II with the "Heavenly Star" music video playing in the background

Lumines II uses the same core gameplay of its predecessor Lumines: Puzzle Fusion with new features included. The objective is to move, rotate, and drop blocks to form 2×2 squares or larger of the same color (referred to as a colored square). A vertical line known as the Time Line sweeps across the field from left to right and erases the colored squares; awarding points to the player's overall score. Erasing four or more squares will add a bonus multiplier to the player's overall score. Players lose when the blocks reach the top of the board.

All the modes from its predecessor return: Challenge mode, Time Attack, Puzzle, VS CPU, 2P VS mode (renamed Duel mode). Challenge mode has been modified and expanded to four classes: B, A, S, and Enduro. Class B is designed for beginners, Class A for intermediate players, and Class S is for advanced players. These classes can be played up to three full laps. The Enduro class uses all the skins and can only be unlocked after completing at least one lap of the first three classes. Time Attack adds a new feature that allows players to record and save their playthrough to be viewed in the Replay Theater.

Lumines II introduces three new modes: Mission mode, Skin Edit mode, and Sequencer. In Mission mode, players are given various tasks to complete, such as erasing all existing blocks using two squares or a specific number of blocks in a set of time. Skin Edit mode allows players to create their custom playlist using skins previously unlocked in Challenge mode. Skin Edit mode is divided into two settings: Single Lap where players can select up to ten skins and compete for the top score; and Endless Lap where players can select as many skins as they like and can play endlessly without a time limit. The Sequencer allows players to create original background music and sound effects from one of four base music types. With each base music, players can save up to 20 original music sequences with each base music used. Up to four skins created from the Sequencer can be ported into Skin Edit Mode. Lumines II also introduces the option to customize the HUD and a tutorial with tips and strategies as well.

== Development ==
Lumines II was developed for the PSP by Q Entertainment with Tetsuya Mizuguchi as the producer and Katsumi Yokota involved in the design and soundtrack alongside Takayuki Nakamura. During development, Mizuguchi was influenced by music videos and wanted to incorporate music videos into the game. To showcase his vision for Lumines II, the development team needed to find music and videos with the right tone, mix, and energy to incorporate into the game. When Mizuguchi couldn't find a music video involving people cheering, he produced his own that resembled hand-drawn animation.

For the development of Lumines: Puzzle Fusion, audio had to be completed before finalizing the skin's design. Yokota decided to do a different approach with Lumines II and Lumines Live!. Instead, skin designs took priority to provide more concrete suggestions for the audio. Yokota stated this made greater variation possible for the music tracks. 100 songs were initially planned during development of the game. Mizuguchi emphasized the content in Lumines II over the first one with more skins and songs than the original. He further explained that he wanted to push the UMD to its limits. Mizuguchi also emphasized that he wanted the game to have its own original atmosphere and stylistic experience, different from the original, and compared the game to a party with himself as a party organizer.

== Promotion and release ==
To promote the game's release, Q Entertainment released a demo titled Lumines II: Taster version for Microsoft Windows on November 22, 2006, from the game's North American official website. In Japan, a PSP demo was made available to download from the game's Japanese official site on April 27, 2007.

The game was released in North America on November 7, 2006, in Europe on November 17, 2006, and in Australia on November 23, 2006. The Japanese version was released later on February 15, 2007. The Japanese version adds new tracks from artists such as Ken Ishii, Genki Rockets, and Def Tech, while removing New Order, Missy Elliott, and Beck. Upon the Japanese release of the game, a launch party event was taken place at the Daikanyama Air club to promote its release. Music artist Suigirumn, whose music was featured in the Japanese version of Lumines II, attended the event as the DJ. The first 50 attendees who brought a copy of the game were able to attend for free and the first 30 were also given a free T-shirt.

In Japan, a deluxe version was released on the same day as the standard version. It was made available for preorder via Sega Direct and included decorative stickers and a CD soundtrack titled, "Techriders / Exclusive Tracks for Lumines II". Sega ran a raffle contest between February 15 to February 21, 2007, for three contestants to receive the Deluxe version, a T-shirt, and a poster signed by Tetsuya Mizuguchi. Q Entertainment also collaborated with Angel Love Online to promote the game. Players of Angel Love Online could implement avatars from Lumines II as their character profile picture.

The single Heavenly Star by Genki Rockets was released on the iTunes store on December 15, 2006. Another soundtrack was released by series composer Takayuki Nakamura on December 31, 2007, titled "L.II remixes". The album was released by Nakamura's sound design company Brainstorm and included tracks from Lumines II and the original Lumines: Puzzle Fusion game. Nakamura used his experience as a sound effects designer to make such noises as crashing waves and ticking clocks an integral part of the Lumines remixes albums.

== Reception ==
Reception

Aggregate score
Aggregator	Score
Metacritic	81/100

Review scores
Publication	Score
Edge	6/10
Electronic Gaming Monthly	7.5/10 (Note: Three critics of Electronic Gaming Monthly gave the game each a score of 7.5/10, 6/10, and 9/10.)
Eurogamer	6/10
Famitsu	31/40
Game Informer	9/10
GameDaily	10/10
GameRevolution	C−
GameSpot	8.4/10
GameSpy	4/5
GameTrailers	8.8/10
GameZone	7.8/10
IGN	9/10
Official U.S. PlayStation Magazine	6/10
Pocket Gamer	4.5/5
Retro Gamer	69%
X-Play	4/5
The Sydney Morning Herald	3.5/5
The Times	4/5

The game received "favorable" reviews according to the review aggregation website Metacritic. In Japan, Famitsu gave it a score of 31 out of 40.

A common compliment from reviewers was the new features introduced in the game. Pocket Gamer praised the new features introduced in Lumines II, specifically the Sequencer and called it "brilliant". IGN gave compliments to the new features and claimed it managed to expand on just about every facet of its predecessor. GameDaily also noted Lumines II improved on the original while staying true to the franchise's spirit. GamePro found the Mission mode enjoyable and noted it to be challenging for both newcomers and veteran players. (Note: GamePro gave the game three 4.5/5 scores for graphics, sound, and control, and 4/5 for fun factor.) GameSpot also gave the game a favorable review, although had minor criticisms of the new modes for not feeling fresh. One particular feature that was criticized was the skins that use music videos for their respective licensed songs, due to not able to enjoy them as much as during gameplay. PALGN appreciated the Skin edit mode and Sequencer features allowing them to customize the order of the skins and also create their own beats.

The song selection received mixed reviews. Pocket Gamer noted that the enjoyment of the game depended on the song selection, but also stated that it is still possible to be entranced by the music one normally hates by being entranced by the gameplay. Eurogamer was more critical, criticizing the inclusion of western songs, calling the original game the better option. PALGN was also disappointed in the song selection for a western audience, but felt it didn't ruin the game. GameSpot noted that Lumines fans may be put off by newer artists, but noted the soundtrack is robust, well-around, and able to appeal to a larger audience. Game Informer shared similar sentiment to GameSpot, stating that the soundtrack isn't made up of "Top 40 Countdown" and uses underground music alongside returning songs. GameDaily stated that the songs from the "tried-and-true" music artists were considerably old and didn't have the same impact from when initially released, while noting that the songs work well with the overall feel of the game.

GameZone criticized the game, stating "When a game is as much to play as the first Lumines then it's hard to accept limited imitations packaged as new editions." However, Edge gave it six out of ten, saying, "Memories of Mizuguchi's original may hold more value than anything offered here, making for an unusual proposition. Highly enjoyable as it is, Lumines II is tough to recommend."

Lumines II won the Special Class award and Song Collection in the 2006 NAVGTR Awards. The song implemented into the game, Heavenly Star by Genki Rockets, was nominated for Best Song in the 2006 Spike TV Video Game Awards and 2006 NAVGTR Awards.
