= Tube Slider =

2003 racing video game

- Developer: NDcube
- Publisher: NEC Interchannel
- Directors: Jun Uriu; Manabu Washio
- Producer: Masayuki Akahori
- Designers: Kazushi Maeta; Kenji Nomura
- Programmer: Jun Uriu
- Artists: Nizo Yamamoto; Takashi Watabe
- Composers: Takayuki Nakamura; Mitsuteru Furukawa
- Platform: GameCube
- Release: NA: April 15, 2003
- Genre: Racing
- Modes: Single-player, multiplayer

Tube Slider is a 2003 racing video game developed by NDcube and published by NEC Interchannel for the GameCube. It was released only in North America; a Japanese release was planned but canceled for unknown reasons. The game takes place on Earth in the middle of the 21st century, where a new sport based around tube sliding was born out of people's desire for speed and competition after motorsports were abolished. The player can choose between one of eight futuristic formula vehicles, each one varying in terms of performance, and race against computer-controlled opponents across ten tracks divided into three sessions.

NDcube, a subsidiary of Nintendo that previously worked on F-Zero: Maximum Velocity for Game Boy Advance, originally pitched Tube Slider as an entry in the F-Zero franchise but it was later reworked into a stand-alone game. The team aimed to capture the experience of racing down an enclosed tube course, which gave them the ability to design futuristic and complex track structures not found in typical racing games, with the staff conducting research on race tracks and roller coasters during development. Japanese animation studio Studio 4°C were responsible for the game's vehicle designs. The soundtrack was scored by Takayuki Nakamura and Mitsuteru Furukawa, the latter of whom also worked on Maximum Velocity. The game received mixed reception from critics, with praise for its graphics but more divided opinions on the music and gameplay.

== Gameplay ==
The Vanilla locking on a rival vehicle to steal energy at the Sunset Highway track

Tube Slider is a futuristic racing game in the vein of F-Zero and Wipeout, where players compete in a high-speed formula racing championship. The game is set on Earth in the middle of the 21st century, where hydrogen-based power has replaced fossil fuels and spelled the end of motorsports. Despite the peaceful and environmental preservationist culture of the world, people sought to satisfy their desire for speed and competition, leading to the birth of a new sport based around tube sliding. The player compete in races against other opponents, either human or computer-controlled. There are eight futuristic formula vehicles to choose from, each one varying in terms of performance. The vehicles in the game race through transparent tubes that are often suspended off the ground and lacking in hazards.

A race in Tube Slider consists of three laps around the course, and players must complete each lap in a successively higher place to avoid disqualification from the championship. Only the normal speed setting is available at the beginning of the game, but a maximum speed setting can be unlocked. A unique gameplay feature is the "Sub Vernier" mechanic; at the start of a race, players can select between booster or turbo speed enhancers their vehicle might employ. Turbo allows a speed burst that lasts depending on the vehicle's energy level, while booster lets players store up to three short bursts of speed that can be used at any given time. Energy for the vehicle is automatically replenished. However, players can steal energy from an opponent by lining up their vehicle and locking on a rival vehicle. Three types of "velocity pick-ups" are also placed on determined parts of each course: Blue pick-ups provide extra energy for the vehicle, while green and red pick-ups grant a brief speed boost. Every vehicle is also equipped with slide jets to handle sharp turns, activated via the shoulder buttons.

=== Game modes ===
Tube Slider offers two main modes and each contains different play modes: Compete (Grand Prix, Versus and Time Attack) and Training (Course Practice, Free Run and Tutorial). The Grand Prix mode is very similar to F-Zero; The player must score races to win points across ten tracks divided into three sessions, two of which are mirrored, and by having the highest sum of points the player wins a championship. Upon winning the championship, a new session and new courses are unlocked. Upon winning the final session, a palette swap of the chosen vehicle is awarded. Versus mode allows up to four players compete against each other in head-to-head races on a split screen. Time Attack is a time trial mode where players compete against the clock in an attempt to obtain the best time possible on each track. Course Practice eases the player to get familiarized with two of the game's courses by collecting targets placed on the track. Free Run also lets the player practice on any of the game's tracks cleared in Grand Prix mode. Tutorial, as the name implies, features video segments that give players a basic gameplay rundown.

== Development and release ==
There have been racing games, but none that capture the feeling of blasting down a bobsled or luge track.

— Designer Kazushi Maeta gave Tube Slider its raison d'être.

Tube Slider was developed by NDcube, a joint venture between Dentsu and Nintendo founded on March 1, 2000, which previously worked on F-Zero: Maximum Velocity for Game Boy Advance. It was co-directed by Jun Uriu and Manabu Washio alongside producer Masayuki Akahori. Uriu also acted as program director. Kenji Nomura served as design director, with Kazushi Maeta acting as planner. Nizo Yamamoto and Takashi Watabe handled the artwork. Japanese animation studio Studio 4°C were responsible for the game's vehicle designs. The soundtrack was scored by Takayuki Nakamura and Mitsuteru Furukawa. Nakamura also served as the sound director, while Furukawa previously worked with Masaru Tajima and F-Zero co-composer Naoto Ishida on Maximum Velocity.

Tube Slider was originally pitched as an entry in the F-Zero franchise, but it was later reworked into a stand-alone game. Maeta divulged details about its development process in a 2003 interview. He explained that the enclosed tube courses gave NDcube the ability to design futuristic and complex track structures not found in typical racing games. For its title, Maeda remarked that the crew wanted a name that gave players an idea of what the game is about. He also claimed that the staff conducted hours of research on race tracks worldwide and roller coasters while developing the game. Maeda stated that the team aimed to capture the experience of racing down a "bobsled or luge track" with the game. He additionally stated that their work in F-Zero: Maximum Velocity gave them experience in creating a great sense of speed, which they felt it was important, but expressed that the game's physics were different compared to F-Zero. Maeda felt that the GameCube was a good choice for the project, as the platform "lets developers deal with memory and texture issues very easily".

Tube Slider was initially slated for release in February 2003, before being shipped on April 15. It was the first of two titles to be released under NEC Interchannel, a North American gaming division of NEC, headed by former Capcom senior vice president Clint Kurahashi, intended to publish games for PlayStation 2, Game Boy Advance, GameCube and Xbox.

== Reception ==
Reception

Aggregate score
Aggregator	Score
Metacritic	62/100

Review scores
Publication	Score
Electronic Gaming Monthly	3.5/10, 4.5/10, 4/10
GameRevolution	5/10
GameSpot	5.6/10
GameSpy	75/100
GameZone	7.5/10
IGN	6.1/10
Nintendo World Report	6/10
X-Play	2/5
GMR	5/10
Nintendojo	7/10
Play	4.5/5

Tube Slider garnered "mixed or average" reviews, according to review aggregator site Metacritic. GameSpy's Benjamin Turner gave positive remarks to the "tight" graphics, gameplay and multiplayer. However, Turner saw the complex AI, steep learning curve, and lack of additional content as the game's negative aspects. IGN's Matt Casamassina commended the game's colorful graphics for the unique and varied tube tracks, but found its presentation and audio average. Casamassina felt that the gameplay lacked polish and depth compared to XGRA and F-Zero, stating that it was a "decent F-Zero clone that succeeds on some levels and fails on others."

GameSpot's Ryan Davis commended the soundtrack for working well within its context, while finding the tube tracks to be its most unique aspect, but faulted the presentation. Davis recommended Extreme-G 3 instead, labeling Tube Slider as a "generally uninteresting futuristic racer that doesn't do anything that hasn't already been done, and done better, by previous futuristic racers." GameZone's Louis Bedigian praised its gameplay for being different compared to F-Zero and other futuristic racing titles, visual effects, accessible difficulty and concept. Bedigian also highlighted the multiplayer as one of its best features. Play's Dave Halverson lauded its audiovisual presentation and vehicle designs.

GameRevolution's Nebojsa Radakovic positively noted the game's smooth framerate and subtleties of speed maintenance, but criticized its uninteresting setting, lack of additional modes and ubiquity. X-Play's Sandon Chin regarded it as an average game lacking in depth and variety, finding the ability to steal energy from a rival craft as its only unique feature. Nintendo World Report's Jeff Shirley commended the detailed environments, music and responsive controls, but leveraged his criticism at its limited number of tracks, cheap difficulty and generic feeling.

Electronic Gaming Monthly's three reviewers criticized its shallow gameplay, energy-stealing mechanic for not working well, backgrounds and "questionable" physics, recommending the original Wipeout instead. GMR's Andrew Pfister praised the title's graphical prowess for its consistent framerate, but ultimately found it boring due to tracks lacking obstacles because of their nature. Nintendojo's Glenn Dillard summarized that "Tube Slider is a mildly fast racing game with mediocre techno beats, unbalanced gameplay, but “wow" worthy environments." Destructoid's Tony Ponce gave Tube Slider an overall negative retrospective outlook, lambasting its audiovisual department, low number of tracks, steep learning curve, and cheap AI. PCMag's Benj Edwards opined that the game was a underrated futuristic racer.
