= Lumines =

Puzzle video game series

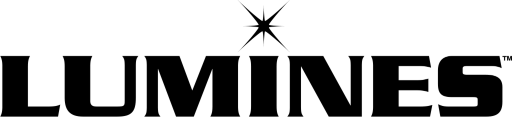
- Genre: Puzzle
- Developers: Q Entertainment; Mobcast; Resonair
- Publishers: Bandai Namco Entertainment; Buena Vista Games; Microsoft Game Studios; Ubisoft; Enhance Games
- Creator: Tetsuya Mizuguchi
- Platforms: Android, iOS, mobile phone, Windows, PlayStation 2, PlayStation 3, PlayStation 4, PlayStation Portable, PlayStation Vita, Xbox 360, Xbox One, Nintendo Switch
- First release: Lumines: Puzzle Fusion; December 12, 2004
- Latest release: Lumines Arise; November 11, 2025

Lumines (Note: Japanese: ルミネス, Hepburn: Ruminesu) (/ˈluːmɪnɛs/ LOO-min-ess) is a puzzle video game series developed by Q Entertainment. The core objective of the games is to survive by rotating and aligning 2×2 blocks varying between two colors to form 2×2 squares of a single color which will be erased when the Time Line passes over them. The game is lost when the blocks reach the top of the playing field.

The series was initially conceived when Tetsuya Mizuguchi heard about the PlayStation Portable and wanted to develop a game for it. Since the original release, several sequels have been developed and released for multiple platforms, including PC, PlayStation 2, PlayStation 3, PlayStation Portable, PlayStation Vita, Xbox 360, Xbox One, Nintendo Switch, mobile phone, iOS, and Android.

The series has received many positive reviews and awards with the original receiving the highest review score ratings and the majority of the awards.

== Gameplay ==
Screenshot of Lumines: Puzzle Fusion with one of its iconic skins, "Shinin / Mondo Grosso"

Lumines is a block-dropping game that seems at first similar to Columns and Tetris. The game is made up of a 16×10 grid playing field. A sequence of 2×2 blocks varying between two colors fall from the top of the playing field. When part of a falling block hits an obstruction, the remaining portion will split off and continue to fall. A vertical "Time Line" sweeps through the playing field from left to right. When a group of 2×2 blocks of the same color is created on the playing field, it creates a "colored square". When the Time Line passes through it, the colored square will disappear and points are added to the player's overall score. If the colored square is created in the middle of the Time Line, the Time Line will only take half of the colored square and no points will be awarded. Certain blocks with gems are known as "special blocks" and if are used to create colored squares, they will allow all individual adjacent blocks of the same color to be eliminated by the Time Line. In some games in the series, the special block is replaced with the "chain block", which connects to all adjacent blocks, whether or not a square is created.

The games feature background skins, which change the appearance of the visuals and blocks, and contain a different music track and sound effects. Skins are unlocked by progressing through the different game modes. Skins have different Time Line speeds, depending on the track's tempo. This can affect the gameplay; faster Time Lines make it more difficult to create large combos, and slower Time Lines may cause the playing field to fill while waiting for the Time Line to erase squares.

The objective is to rotate and align the blocks in such a way as to create colored squares. Increasing score multipliers are earned by repeatedly clearing 3~4 squares (depending on the game) on consecutive Time Line sweeps. Score bonuses are also awarded by reducing all remaining tiles to one single color or for removing all non-active tiles from the screen altogether. Multiple colored squares of the same color can be shared between a single geometric shape. For example, if one should get a 2x3 area of matching blocks, the middle portion will "share" itself with both the left and right halves and create two colored squares. The player loses when the blocks pile up to the top of the grid.

== Development ==
Release timeline
2004	Lumines: Puzzle Fusion
2005
2006	Lumines Live!
2006	Lumines II
2006	Lumines: Puzzle Music Mobile
2007	Lumines Plus
2008
2009	Lumines Supernova
2009	Lumines: Touch Fusion
2010	Lumines: In The House Ibiza '10
2011	Lumines: Electronic Symphony
2012
2013
2014
2015
2016	Lumines: Puzzle & Music
2017
2018	Lumines Remastered
2019
2020
2021
2022
2023
2024
2025	Lumines Arise

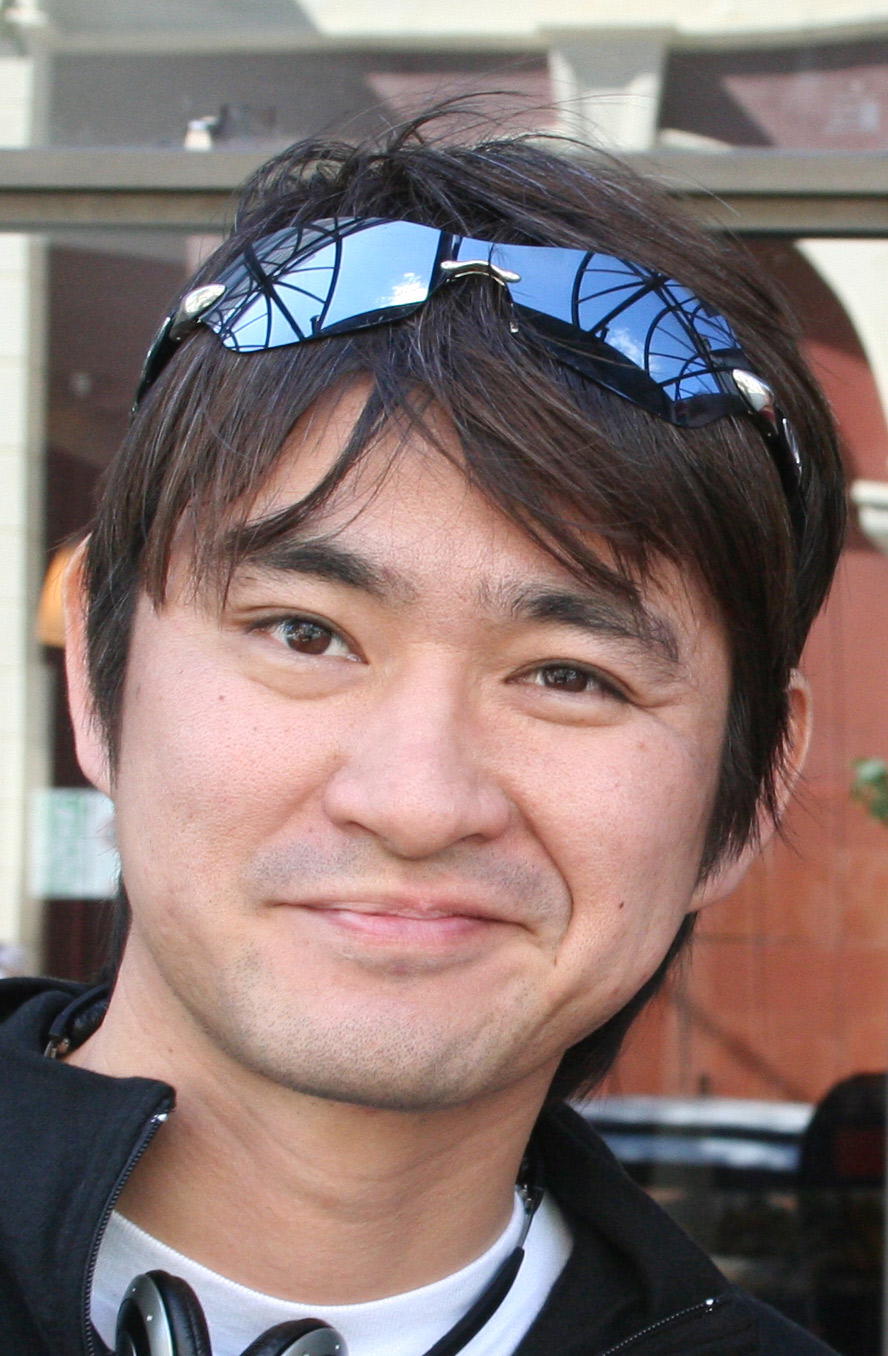
Tetsuya Mizuguchi, the creator of Lumines, was involved in every main entry of the series.

The series began with Lumines: Puzzle Fusion. The game was the first game developed by Q Entertainment and was a launch title for the PlayStation Portable. The game was developed with an estimated amount of 4 or 5 people for over 1 year. Mizuguchi was inspired by the PSP when he first learned about the technology. He described the PlayStation Portable as an "interactive Walkman" and "Dream machine" due to the system being one of the few video game handheld consoles with a headphone jack, allowing the game to be played at any time, any location, and any style with good sound. After choosing the PSP as the next console to work with, Mizuguchi was inspired to make a puzzle game with music. Mizuguchi stated he wanted it to be an audio-visual puzzle game for the challenge, but he also wanted to make something that was less daunting to players compared to his previous titles Rez or Space Channel 5, so that it would attract casual players. Originally, Mizuguchi wanted to make a Tetris game with music but due to various issues including licensing, it was not possible at the time and the concept of Lumines was used instead. His original hopes would eventually come to be when, in 2018, Tetris Effect was released for PS4. Lumines' subtitle "Puzzle Fusion" reflected that the game's music was essential to the game itself. Katsumi Yokota implemented strict rules for the series that the songs would follow 4/4 time signature, with the exception of "Big Elpaso". This was due to the playing field being divided into 16 rows, and the Time Line needing to match the tempo of the music and in sync with the beat. By using 4/4 time signature, it allows a total of sixteen eighth-notes to correspond to two bars precisely.

After the game was released, three titles were being developed simultaneously: Lumines Plus, Lumines II, and Lumines Live! for PlayStation 2, PSP, and Xbox 360 respectively. Tetsuya Mizuguchi wanted to achieve different things for each game. Lumines Plus was intended to be a direct port of the original Lumines: Puzzle Fusion with additional songs and skins. For Lumines II, Mizuguchi emphasized he wanted the game to have its own original atmosphere and stylistic experience, different from the original. In addition, licensed songs from famous artists such as Gwen Stefani, Black Eyed Peas and The Chemical Brothers were incorporated into the game's soundtrack. Mizuguchi described Lumines II as a party and described himself as a party organizer to make the biggest party experience on the PSP. For Lumines Live!, Mizuguchi developed the game with the concept of customizing music and choosing and downloading new songs. The goal of the game was to use everything that was happening during the time and make it available through DLC. Mizuguchi compared the game to a TV channel where they feed what the next thing will be.

Originally development of Lumines: Puzzle Fusion, audio had to be completed before finalizing the skin's design. Yokota decided to do a different approach with Lumines II and Lumines Live!. Instead, skin designs took priority in order to provide more concrete suggestions for the audio. Yokota stated this made greater variation possible for the music tracks.

== Games ==
=== Main series ===
Title	Original release date		
Title	Japan	North America	PAL region
Lumines: Puzzle Fusion	December 12, 2004	March 22, 2005	September 1, 2005
Notes: Originally released on PlayStation Portable; Developed and Published by Q Entertainment; Ports were released on Mobile phone, PlayStation 2, and Microsoft Windows; The first puzzle video game in the series. Created by game designer Tetsuya Mizuguchi and his company, Q Entertainment, it was first released as a launch title for the PlayStation Portable. It later received mobile phone version in 2006 and a port to Microsoft Windows released first in December 2007.
Lumines Live!	March 7, 2007	January 24, 2007	October 18, 2006
Notes: Originally released on Xbox 360 (via XBLA); Developed and published by Q Entertainment; The next entry in the series. The game runs in 720p and supports 5.1 Dolby Digital surround sound. It features built-in multiplayer both offline and online, Achievements, Leaderboards and GamerScore support and online competitive modes. A new feature in Lumines Live! over the original Lumines is the ability to create one's own sequence of skins from the skins that have been unlocked through single play mode. Lumines Live! is included on the Qubed compilation for Xbox 360 along with Rez HD and Every Extend Extra Extreme.
Lumines II	February 15, 2007	November 6, 2006	November 17, 2006
Notes: Lumines II: Released on PlayStation Portable; Developed and published by Q Entertainment; A direct sequel to the original. Offers new modes such as Mission mode, Skin Edit mode, and Sequencer that allows players to create their music using sounds. The game also uses music from famous music artists such as Gwen Stefani, Black-Eyed Peas, and Hoobastank.
Lumines Supernova	December 18, 2008	October 15, 2009	October 22, 2009
Notes: Released on PlayStation 3 (via PSN); Developed and published by Q Entertainment; It has all the features of Lumines Live! (with the exception of online multiplayer) as well as the sequencer from Lumines II and a new mode, DigDown Mode. DigDown Mode is a timed mode where the player has to clear two vertical lines within a time limit to move "down" to the next stage. It was delisted from European stores in 2017.
Lumines: Touch Fusion	August 27, 2009	August 27, 2009	August 27, 2009
Notes: Originally released on iOS; Developed and published by Q Entertainment; The first title to be developed for smartphones. It has many of the features the original Lumines has with Vs mode being the only missing feature.
Lumines: Electronic Symphony	April 19, 2012	February 14, 2012	February 22, 2012
Notes: Released on PlayStation Vita; Developed and published by Q Entertainment; The game was announced in Gamescom 2011, having its first showcase at Tokyo Game Show 2011. According to an article posted on the PlayStation Blog by Producer James Mielke, "Lumines Electronic Symphony is a music-puzzle game that merges vivid colors and shapes with the intoxicating beats of an electronica soundtrack."
Lumines: Puzzle & Music	September 1, 2016	September 1, 2016	September 1, 2016
Notes: Released on iOS and Android; Published and developed by Mobcast with Resonair as codevelopers.; In January 2015, the rights to both Lumines and Meteos were acquired by Mobcast, and the company announced the development of a new Lumines mobile game. With many of the original development team involved, including director Tetsuya Mizuguchi, Lumines Puzzle & Music released on mobile formats on July 12, 2016, in Japan and on September 1, 2016, in North America and Europe. The initial game includes two "albums", one composed of eight new songs and the other of six songs from the original game, including Mondo Grosso's "Shinin'". Another Lumines mobile title, a free-to-play entry titled Lumines Vs., is slated for release in Q4 of 2016.
Lumines Remastered	June 26, 2018	June 26, 2018	June 26, 2018
Notes: Released on PlayStation 4, Xbox One, Nintendo Switch, Microsoft Windows; Published by Enhance Games and developed by Resonair.; In March 2018, Enhance Games, the studio founded by Lumines: Puzzle Fusion producer Mizuguchi, announced Lumines Remastered for Microsoft Windows, Nintendo Switch, PlayStation 4, and Xbox One for release in June 2018; the game is being developed by Japanese studio Resonair. The game features enhanced visuals and support for higher-resolution systems.
Lumines Arise	November 11, 2025	November 11, 2025	November 11, 2025
Notes: released on PlayStation 5 and Microsoft Windows; Published and developed by Enhance Games, with Monstars Inc. as co-developers; On June 4, 2025, Enhance Games released a trailer for the next installment in the Lumines franchise, Lumines Arise, for PlayStation 5 and PC for release in Fall 2025. The game takes inspiration from their previous title, Tetris Effect: Connected, using a similar art style to that game. The game also introduces a new mechanic called 'Burst' to allow players to fill up a bar and lock squares on the playing field, building into a larger square to then score more points.

=== Mobile phone ===
Multiple mobile phone titles were released in Japan, Europe, and North America. In Japan, a number of mobile phone versions were released by different carriers as part of the Lumines Mobile subseries. The first one is titled Lumines: Puzzle Music Mobile (Note: ルミネスモバイル, Ruminesu mobairu) and was released on April 18, 2007. The game changed names between carrier. i-mode's version is titled Lumines♪Puzzle & Music (Note: ルミネス♪パズル＆MUSIC), the EZweb version is titled, Oto to hikari no Puzzle★Lumines (Note: 音と光のパズル★ルミネス, lit. "Light and Sound Puzzle★Lumines"), and the Softbank version is titled, Lumines★Puzzle Music (Note: ルミネス★パズルMUSIC) A customized version of this game for DeNA's Mobage Town titled Lumines for Mobage was released on January 24, 2008. A mobile phone version of Lumines Live! was released pre-installed on NTT Docomo's N-02B model. Another version of Lumines was pre-installed on NTT Docomo's N07A mobile phone model via i-αppli widget on July 10, 2009.

In Europe and North America, two Mobile phone versions were released by Q Entertainment. The first mobile phone game was an adaptation of the original Lumines: Puzzle Fusion developed by Gameloft. The second mobile phone game, titled Lumines: In the House Ibiza '10, was developed by Connect2Media and released in Europe on August 11, 2010, and in North America on March 18, 2012. The game uses dance songs from Defected Records and skins to match the feel of Defected Records. The game contains Survival mode, Time Attack mode, Skin edit mode, and DigDown mode from previous titles. In partnership with T-Mobile, a competition was made to promote the game that ran from August 12 to August 31, 2010. Winners were awarded merchandise from Defected Records.

== Reception ==
Aggregate review scores
Game	GameRankings	Metacritic
Lumines: Puzzle Fusion	90%	89/100
Lumines II	81%	81/100
Lumines Plus	75%	73/100
Lumines Live!	77%	77/100
Lumines Supernova	82%	80/100
Lumines: Touch Fusion	52%	—
Lumines: Electronic Symphony	84%	83/100
Lumines: Puzzle & Music	84%	84/100
Lumines Remastered	86%	85/100
Lumines Arise	—	87/100

As of 2018, the series has sold over 2.5 million units.

The original Lumines: Puzzle Fusion won several awards including, 2005 Spike TV Video Game Awards for Best Handheld Game, GameSpot's 2005 PSP Game Of The Year, Electronic Gaming Monthly's 2005 Handheld Game Of The Year, Game Informer's "Top 50 Games of 2005" list. Lumines II's song, Heavenly Star by Genki Rockets, was nominated for Best Song in 2006 Spike TV Video Game Awards.

== Legacy ==
Lumines inspired multiple clones. The first is a clone for Microsoft Windows known as Luminator and was released in October 2008 by BVH Distribution. The game features music from DKDENT and was reported to play exactly like Lumines with no deviation in gameplay. A Nintendo DS version was in development by Xider Games and was scheduled to release in August 2007, but no further information was released. An independent developed video game known as Irides: Master of Blocks and was released on June 24, 2009. It was developed by MadPeet and published by Goat Store Publishing on Dreamcast.
