= Q Entertainment =

Japanese video game developer

- Type: Video game development studio
- Industry: Video games
- Founded: October 10, 2003; 22 years ago
- Headquarters: Tokyo, Japan
- Key people: Shuji Utsumi (Chief Executive Officer, co-founder); Tetsuya Mizuguchi (co-founder)

Q Entertainment (Japanese: Qエンターテインメント, Hepburn: Q Entāteinmento) was a Japanese video game developer. The studio created, produced, and published digital entertainment content across multiple game consoles, PC broadband and mobile units. It was founded on October 10, 2003, by Tetsuya Mizuguchi, formerly of Sega (where he was best known for producing the Dreamcast games Space Channel 5 and Rez), and Shuji Utsumi, former founding member of Sony Computer Entertainment America, Senior VP of Sega Enterprises, Ltd., and head of Disney (Buena Vista Games) Asia.

It was best known for their music and luminary action puzzle game series Lumines, which was released worldwide in 2004/2005 for the PlayStation Portable system and has now developed into mobile (Lumines Mobile), Xbox Live Arcade (Lumines Live!) and PlayStation 2 (Lumines Plus) platforms. Q Entertainment's line-up also includes the action puzzle title Meteos for the Nintendo DS and fantasy action title Ninety-Nine Nights for the Xbox 360. Their latest title, Lumines Electronic Symphony, was released in February 2012 for the PlayStation Vita.

Tetsuya Mizuguchi left the company in 2013 as the parent company went defunct. He founded Enhance Games in 2014 and he is the CEO of that company.

Q Entertainment developed the video games for the Quest Beat label, owned by Bandai. Quest Beat is sometimes listed as ((qb)). The main goal of games produced under Quest Beat is "simplicity." They want their games to be "pick up and play," where anybody can understand what to do without needing to read instructions.

== Games released ==
- 2004: Lumines: Puzzle Fusion (PlayStation Portable)
- 2005: Meteos (Nintendo DS)
- 2006: Every Extend Extra (PlayStation Portable)
- 2006: Lumines Live! (Xbox Live Arcade)
- 2006: Lumines II (PlayStation Portable)
- 2007: Every Extend Extra Extreme (Xbox Live Arcade)
- 2008: Meteos Wars (Xbox Live Arcade)
- 2008: Lumines Supernova (PlayStation 3)
- 2009: Lumines Touch Fusion (iOS)
- 2011: Child of Eden (Xbox 360, PlayStation 3)
- 2012: Lumines Electronic Symphony (PlayStation Vita)
- 2012: Guardian Hearts Online (PlayStation Vita)

== Games co-developed and released ==
- 2006: Ninety-Nine Nights (N3) (Xbox 360), co-developed by Phantagram
- 2006: Lumines Mobile (mobile phone)
- 2006: Meteos Mobile (mobile phone)
- 2006: Battle Stadium D.O.N (GameCube, PlayStation 2), co-developed by Takara Tomy and Eighting
- 2006: Gunpey DS (Nintendo DS), co-developed by Koto Laboratory
- 2006: Gunpey (PlayStation Portable), co-developed by Koto Laboratory
- 2007: Lumines Plus (PlayStation 2)
- 2007: Meteos: Disney Magic (Nintendo DS)
- 2007: Lumines: Puzzle Fusion (Windows)
- 2007: Meteos Online (Windows)
- 2007: Angels Online (Windows, PlayStation 3)
- 2008: Rez HD (Xbox Live Arcade)
- 2009: Angel Senki (PC, PlayStation 3, PlayStation Vita, PlayStation 4)
- 2009: Peggle: Dual Shot (Nintendo DS)
- 2010: Ninety-Nine Nights II(Xbox 360), co-developed by feelplus
- 2014: Destiny of Spirits (PlayStation Vita), co-developed by Japan Studio
- Heroes of Infinity (cancelled) (PlayStation Vita), co-developed by Moregeek Entertainment
