= Katsumi Yokota =

Japanese video game designer

Katsumi Yokota (横田 克己, Yokota Katsumi) is a Japanese video game designer and amateur musician who has contributed to the visual design and music of the Lumines series of games. He served as the art director of the original PSP game and as the director of Lumines Supernova for the PlayStation 3. Yokota created the original prototype of Lumines and composed three songs, which were later arranged for the album Lumines Remixes.

== Selected games ==
- Panzer Dragoon Zwei (1996): Ending CG illustrations
- Panzer Dragoon Saga (1998): Illustrations
- Rez (2001): Art Director & Lead Artist
- Lumines (2004): Art Director, Composer (in collaboration with Takayuki Nakamura)
- Lumines Supernova (2008): Director
