= Every Extend Extra Extreme =

2007 video game

- Developer: Q Entertainment
- Publisher: Q Entertainment
- Designer: Tetsuya Mizuguchi
- Platform: Xbox 360
- Release: October 17, 2007
- Genres: Action, shooter
- Modes: Single-player, multiplayer

Every Extend Extra Extreme (Note: Eburi ekusutendo ekusutora ekusutorīmu (エブリ・エクステンド・エクストラ・エクストリーム)) is a game for the Xbox 360's Xbox Live Arcade service released on October 17, 2007. It is an expanded version of the PlayStation Portable game Every Extend Extra which is, in itself, an expanded version of the 2004 freeware title Every Extend.

The game runs in high-definition 1080i and supports 5.1 surround sound. It supports online multiplayer; Achievements; Leaderboards and GamerScore support; and online competitive modes.

== Gameplay ==
In Every Extend Extra Extreme, the player controls a ship which can detonate at any time. This causes any enemies within a certain radius to explode, which in turn cause other enemies to explode in a chain reaction. As the game continues more and more enemies populate the screen allowing longer and higher scoring explosions. The player may halt the chain at any time to pick up power-ups (such as to increase enemy speed, add time, add temporary shield) or to start a new chain reaction.

The explosions add a percussive beat to the background music. The player's ship is destroyed when coming into contact with or being shot by an enemy while the player's shields are down. This resets the level to its initial slow pace and bonus multiplier, therefore hindering the player's scoring.

The game contains four modes of gameplay: E4: The Game Time Unlimited, E4: The Game Time Limited, S4: Wiz ur Musik (taps into the music on the Xbox 360 hard drive and creates randomly generated wire-frame visuals to move across the screen using bass and treble as their director), R4: The Revenge (a shooter mode where the players have to avoid certain enemies)

== Reception ==
Reception

Aggregate score
Aggregator	Score
Metacritic	78/100

Review scores
Publication	Score
1Up.com	B+
4Players	82%
Eurogamer	4/10
GameSpot	7.5/10
IGN	8.5/10
Official Xbox Magazine (UK)	7/10
Official Xbox Magazine (US)	7/10
PALGN	7.5/10
TeamXbox	8.4/10

Every Extend Extra Extreme received "generally favorable reviews" according to the review aggregation website Metacritic.

IGN described it as "unique" and "trippy". GameSpot complimented the visuals, stating, "It's as much an interactive lightshow as it is a game, and the flashing, spacey visuals in combination with the pulsing, electronic soundtrack make it a hypnotic and singular experience." Eurogamer was more negative towards the game, criticizing how easy it was to get on the top leaderboard and unable to do anything during chains.
