= Lumines: Electronic Symphony =

2012 video game

- Developers: Q Entertainment; Rocket Studio
- Publisher: Ubisoft
- Director: Ding Dong
- Producer: James Mielke
- Series: Lumines
- Platform: PlayStation Vita
- Release: NA: February 15, 2012; PAL: February 22, 2012; JP: April 19, 2012
- Genre: Puzzle

Lumines: Electronic Symphony (Note: Japanese: ルミネス エレクトロニック シンフォニー, Hepburn: Ruminesu Erekutoronikku Shinfonī) is a 2012 puzzle video game developed by Q Entertainment and published by Ubisoft for the PlayStation Vita.

The game was first announced in Cologne, by publisher Ubisoft at Gamescom 2011, with its first hands-on showcase at Tokyo Game Show 2011. The playable demo featured The Chemical Brothers' song "Hey Boy Hey Girl" and Kaskade's "4 AM" as the game's first confirmed artists and songs.

== Gameplay ==
Lumines: Electronic Symphony has the same core gameplay of the previous Lumines titles. The objective is to survive by rotating and moving blocks onto the board. Blocks are made up of 2x2 and vary between two colors. If they're arranged to form a set of 2x2 of the same color, they form a colored square. Once the Time Line sweeps over the colored squares, they will be eliminated and points will be added to the player's overall score. If the blocks reach the top of the board, the player loses the game. Lumines: Electronic Symphony supports controlling the game using the PlayStation Vita's front touch screen, back touchpad, and using the console's buttons, triggers, and sticks, with players being able to use multiple control methods at once.

There are six game modes: Voyage, Playlist, Duel, Stopwatch, Master, and World Block. Voyage is similar to Challenge Mode from previous titles. In Voyage players must continuously create colored squares. After a set of colored squares have been erased, the player moves onto the next stage. Unlike Challenge mode, where the block drop speed and challenge increase after each completed stage, Voyage's difficulty is set in waves where it decreases and increases difficulty after each completed stage. Playlist allows players to select a number of previously unlocked skins and play them in the order they choose to. Duel allows players to play against each other in local multiplayer. Stopwatch is the same as the Time Attack mode from previous titles. Stopwatch give the player a limited time to clear as many blocks as possible. There are four levels of difficulty: 30 seconds, 60 seconds, 180 seconds, and 300 seconds. In Master, players must make a select amount of colored squares in order to move onto the next zone. Each zone increases in difficulty with a total of five zones. In World Block, players can join online and work together to erase the world block every 24 hours.

=== New features ===
Two new blocks are added in Lumines: Electronic Symphony: Chain block and Shuffle block. The Chain block acts similar to the Special block in previous Lumines titles, the difference being that it does not need to be activated by creating a colored square with it. Instead, any block adjacent color can be chained together for the Time Line to erase it, however no points are awarded for the single blocks. When a shuffle block lands on a cluster of blocks on the board, it will shuffle the colors of the blocks within the cluster, and may create or undo colored squares in the process.

In previous Lumines titles, players unlocked skins based on their ability to successfully reach that skin in Challenge Mode. However, in Lumines: Electronic Symphony, an experience point system has been integrated. XP is awarded after each session based on how many colored squares were erased from the board. Additional skins and avatars can be unlocked when the player levels up. Players can select avatars to use in each play session as previous titles offered, however, Lumines: Electronic Symphony added new functions for the avatars. Each avatar has a single player and a multiplayer ability. Avatars can use their abilities once they reached their power at 100%. Power can be gained by repeatedly tapping the back touchpad.

== Development ==
James Mielke, producer at Q Entertainment (and former Electronic Gaming Monthly editor-in-chief), originally pitched the game to Ubisoft as "Daft Punk Lumines". He had wanted to distinguish the Vita version of Lumines and felt that linking it to a particular artist would provide that experience. Daft Punk had met Tetsuya Mizuguchi in the past and were familiar with his work, so they were excited to be involved. They had wanted to compose a completely new set of music for the game but were too busy writing the soundtrack for Tron: Legacy. Consequently, they were forced to drop the project until a future date. Mielke and Tetsuya Mizuguchi both collaborated on what kind of Lumines game they wanted to make. Mizuguchi wanted to make a Lumines game with flowers and lights. "Lumines: Electro Light Orchestra" was almost used before Q Entertainment's legal department thought it could cause problems with Electric Light Orchestra. It was then decided to use the name Lumines Electronic Symphony. Q Entertainment enlisted the design firm, BUILD (which was founded by former Designers Republic and Psygnosis members), to create much of the game's marketing materials, such as the new logo, in-game font, and graphic elements for the package design.

Due to the majority of the development team working on Child of Eden at the time, Rocket Studio was hired as an external programming team alongside an anonymous director, which was replaced by Ding Dong from Ubisoft. Ding Dong wanted to focus on adding dynamism into the game by making the background visuals move in conjunction with the blocks dropping onto the playing field. During development, one of the features unique to PSVita that was difficult to incorporate into the game was the use of the back touchpad. Ding Dong clarified that due to Lumines is a game that requires concentration, it was difficult to prevent the back touchpad to interfere with the player's concentration. The end result was to use the back touchpad to store power of the Avatar.

According to James Mielke, "Our goal was simple. We wanted to tell a story through sound. With this in mind, our song selection was done to replicate a groovy lounge instead of trying to develop a non-stop 140BPM megamix. The soundtrack is designed to rise and fall like waves, giving the player both rhythm and respite, which would feel like a musical journey." Mielke spoke of creating a "Say Anything..." moment within the game, referring to the use of a highly familiar vocal track at a key moment to generate a strong emotional impact. Mizuguchi and Mielke later agreed that this could be done solely using electronic music. In the selection and ordering of the tracks, they aimed to show an emotional progression, much like that found on some bands' LPs.

== Reception ==
Reception

Aggregate score
Aggregator	Score
Metacritic	83/100

Review scores
Publication	Score
The A.V. Club	B+
Destructoid	9.5/10
Eurogamer	8/10
Famitsu	32/40
Game Informer	8/10
GameRevolution	8/10
GameSpot	8/10
GameTrailers	8.2/10
Giant Bomb	4/5
IGN	9/10
Joystiq	4.5/5
Pocket Gamer	4/5
PlayStation: The Official Magazine	9/10
VentureBeat	78/100
Digital Spy	4/5
Metro	8/10

The game was released in February 2012, alongside the launch of the PlayStation Vita. It received "favorable" reviews according to the review aggregation website Metacritic. Giant Bomb editor-in-chief Jeff Gerstmann called Lumines: Electronic Symphony "the most fun I've had with the franchise since it debuted on the PSP back in 2004."

Kotaku Australia in its preview described the game's creator as "bringing Lumines back to its electronic roots." Shacknews said in its preview that the game was one of the most expected and impressive launch titles for the Vita, along with Gravity Rush. Thierry Nguyen of 1Up.com wrote in its preview that Lumines: Electronic Symphony "seems like a safe bet that this will end up being another snazzy synesthesia symphony." while GamesRadar+, also in its preview, described in depth the game's mechanics: "As our score grew and the visuals got more and more intense, it was impossible not to slow down and admire how gorgeous it looks in motion."

Wired gave it a score of nine stars out of ten, saying that the game's best new feature "is the ability to sort your favorite tunes into a specified order and play them straight through. Or you can have your favorite song run on an endless loop and relive that moment of pure ecstasy, where it's just you and the music." EGMNow also gave it nine out of ten, saying, "While it doesn't have as extensive of a roster of modes as some of its earlier siblings, Lumines: Electronic Symphony is just utterly fantastic in what it does do-most evident in its stellar soundtrack, which returns to the same thematic roots as the original Lumines. Electronic Symphony must be some sort of alien-technology time machine–turn it on, and suddenly you'll realize it's now hours later." The A.V. Club gave it a B+ and stated, "There is a disappointing paucity of extras beyond the main endurance mode. Players of Lumines could face off against a friend or against a murderer's row of computer characters; Electronic Symphony ditches the 'versus CPU' option." Digital Spy gave it four stars out of five and said, "Limited multiplayer options aside, Lumines Electronic Symphony blends puzzle, rhythm and visuals together in an almost euphoric way. What looks like a humble block-shifting affair at first glance is actually one of the best titles in the PS Vita's launch lineup. Throw in one of the best soundtracks you're ever likely to hear and we have an excellent purchase on our hands." Metro gave it eight out of ten and said, "There are still some pacing issues, but this is the best version of Lumines yet and an artful mix of music, graphics, and puzzle gameplay." In Japan, Famitsu gave it a score of two eights, one seven, and one nine for a total of 32 out of 40. Edge gave it eight out of ten, saying that "with Tetsuya Mizuguchi's often bland musical experimentation replaced with some of electronica's finest moments, Electronic Symphony breathes new life into a series that had previously appeared stagnant." Push Square gave it eight stars out of ten, saying, "Even with the frustrating - and completely optional - touch controls and lack of an online multiplayer mode, Lumines Electronic Symphony is the best in the series."
