= Tetsuya Mizuguchi =

Japanese video game designer, producer and businessman (born 1965)

- 水口 哲也
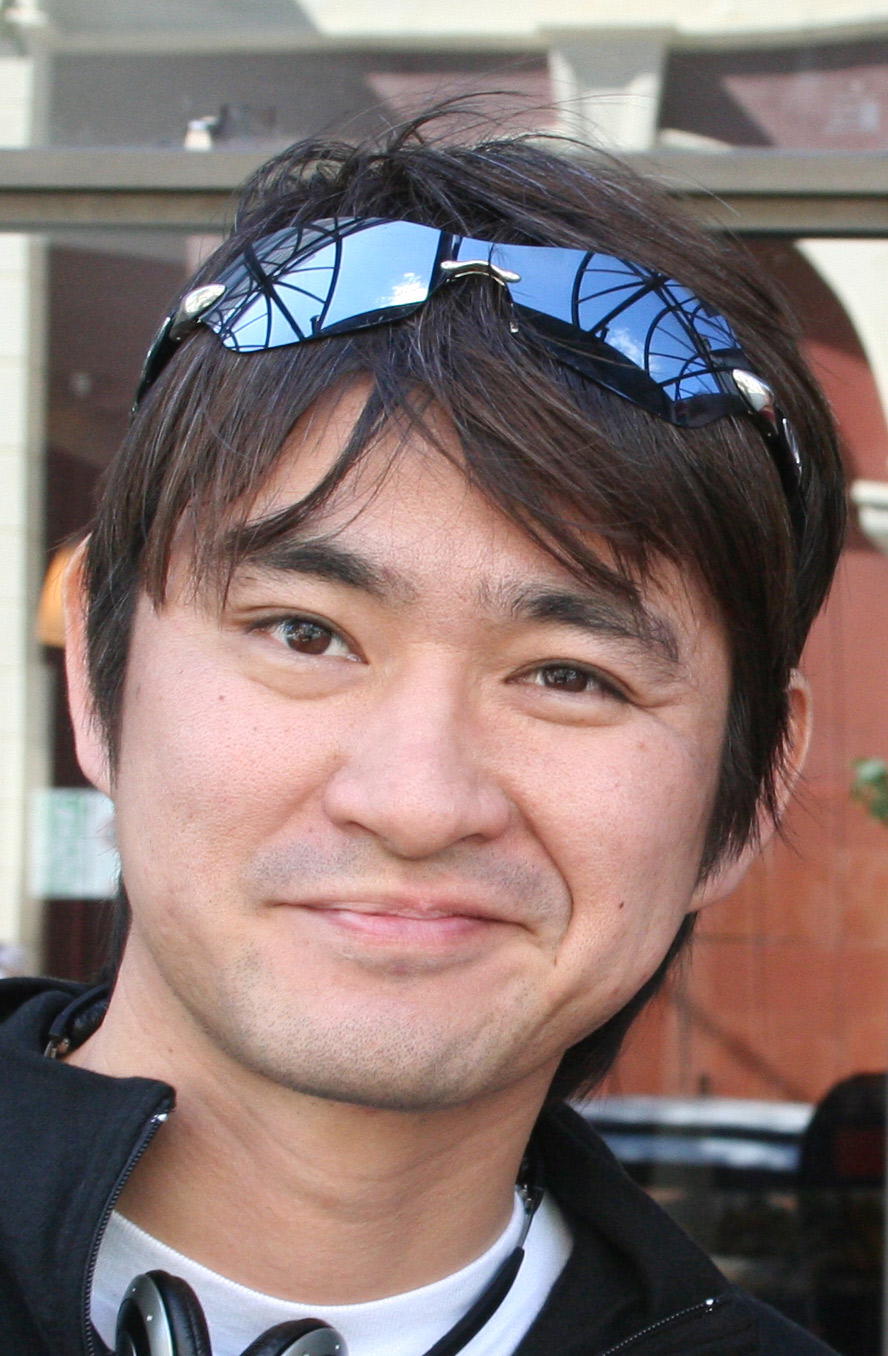
- Mizuguchi in 2007
- Born: May 22, 1965 (age 61); Otaru, Hokkaido, Japan
- Education: Nihon University
- Occupations: Video game producer, Video game director, Music producer,
- Employer(s): Sega (1990–2003); Q Entertainment (2003–2013); Enhance (2014–present)

Tetsuya Mizuguchi (水口 哲也, Mizuguchi Tetsuya; born May 22, 1965) is a Japanese video game designer, producer, and businessman. Along with ex-Sega developers he is one of the co-founders of the video game development firm Q Entertainment. He formerly worked for Sega as a producer in their Sega AM3 'arcade machines' team, developing games like Sega Rally Championship and Sega Touring Car Championship, before moving on to become the head of Sega's United Game Artists division, the team responsible for Rez and Space Channel 5. Mizuguchi is better known for creating video games that incorporate interactive synesthesia into his game design, regardless of genre, evidenced by Rez, Lumines, Child of Eden, and Tetris Effect.

He left Q Entertainment in 2013. He is currently the CEO of Enhance, Inc., a company he founded in 2014.

In 2009, he was chosen by IGN as one of the top 100 game creators of all time.

== Early life ==
Before entering the game industry, Mizuguchi majored in literature at Nihon University's Faculty of Arts. One of the influences for Mizuguchi joining the game industry was a photograph of NASA's view VR headset. Asked how he chose a career in video games, he explained, "I preferred doing something in relation to human senses or entertainment - something more in relation with human nature, a field where I could do some research. ... Unlike the arts, where it is often a matter of taste whether something is good or not, creating good interactive entertainment is more easily definable. I chose Sega because it was using new technology and I was able to study things like human movements."

== Career ==
=== Sega ===
Mizuguchi worked for Japanese game developer Sega from 1990 to 2003 and began his career – not on a game – but by designing arcade cabinets and an interactive 'ride' titled Megalopolis, combining then-embryonic 3D polygonal graphics and CGI (Computer-generated imagery) with the physical experience of Sega's hydraulic 'AS-1' motion simulator. He went on to develop the acclaimed racing simulator, Sega Rally Championship, which was influential in the racing space, inspiring future racing game franchises like Colin McRae Rally (another rally simulator) and the rally segments of Gran Turismo. After forming his own division within Sega, Sega AM Annex, he continued in the racing genre with Sega Rally Championship 2 and Sega Touring Car Championship. During one trip to Zürich in 1998, Mizuguchi witnessed a music festival in which he observed how people were moving toward the music and how the music, sounds, colors, and dancing would change accordingly. Mizuguchi recognized what he observed as synesthesia and decided to focus on rhythm-based music games where he co-created Space Channel 5, Space Channel 5: Part 2, and Rez. Both Space Channel 5 and Rez are referenced in modern gaming media as essential and influential to the development of the modern wave of music-rhythm games, with Harmonix Music Systems co-founder, Alex Rigopulos citing Mizuguchi as an influence in Harmonix's history. Mizuguchi's final position at Sega was Chief Creative Officer of Sega's United Game Artists game division.

In September 2003, Sega performed an internal restructuring of its staff. Among these changes was the dissolution of United Game Artists and the transfer of its members into Sonic Team. The following month, Mizuguchi announced that he would leave Sega on October 10, 2003. He cited the changes in the corporate culture after the Sega-Sammy merger and viewed that as an obstacle to what he wanted to do. He announced that he would work independently in the video game industry through an – at the time – unnamed company.

=== Q Entertainment ===
That company would be Meguro-based Q Entertainment (which he co-founded with a core team of ex-Sega veterans) which initially produced two puzzle games for portable, handheld gaming systems: Lumines for the PlayStation Portable and Meteos for the Nintendo DS. Both games have been released in Japan, North America, and Europe. With Q Entertainment, he later produced Lumines Live! which was released for the Xbox 360 through Microsoft's Xbox Live Arcade service on October 18, 2006. On November 7, 2006, he also produced Lumines II for PSP, the sequel to the popular original (this time supplementing the original score with heavy integration of music videos), and a shooter/puzzle hybrid game called Every Extend Extra (a heavily modified 'synesthesia' update to an existing PC freeware title, Every Extend, by indie developer "Omega"), which was released on August 7, 2006.

Later, to coincide with a Microsoft event at Tokyo Game Show in 2005, Mizuguchi announced that Q Entertainment was working on an action game called Ninety-Nine Nights. A departure from his focus on musical games, Ninety-Nine Nights was Mizuguchi's attempt through an action game to tell the story of a massive, international conflict as viewed through the eyes of various factions. To facilitate the completion of Ninety-Nine Nights, he traveled regularly between Japan and South Korea to work with Ninety-Nine Nights external developer, Phantagram.

Mizuguchi also oversaw the development of Gunpey (for PlayStation Portable and Nintendo DS), an update on the puzzle franchise originally created by Game Boy creator Gunpei Yokoi's development team, Koto Laboratory. The PSP version was rendered in a very Rez style, with vector graphics visuals and an electronic music soundtrack, while the DS version was aimed at a younger audience, featuring a more cartoon-like approach. Additionally, around the same time, a new version of Every Extend Extra was produced by Q Entertainment for Xbox Live called Every Extend Extra Extreme, which was released on October 17, 2007.

At the 2010 Electronic Entertainment Expo in Los Angeles, took the stage at the start of game publisher Ubisoft's annual media event to reveal, to the surprise of the assembled media, the spiritual successor to his game Rez, called Child of Eden. The game was released in July 2011, one of the marquee games for Xbox 360's Kinect motion control system. In late September 2011, Child of Eden was released for PlayStation 3, adding high-definition in-game cinemas, and support for motion control via PlayStation Move, as well as Stereoscopic 3D viewing.

His company's latest game is Lumines Electronic Symphony, which launched on February 22, 2012, and currently holds an aggregate score of 83 out of 100 with at least 45 out of 50 reviews registering as 'positive.' The game is considered a reboot of the Lumines series, and the true sequel to the original PSP game. Mizuguchi put an all-new team in charge of the project, with the task of revitalizing the series, and completing the game in time for the PlayStation Vita's North American and European launch.

Besides designing video games, Mizuguchi has expressed interest in directing music videos. One of the music videos included in Lumines II for the song Heavenly Star by Genki Rockets was directed by Mizuguchi, who also co-wrote the lyrics of the song. He is known for collaborating with various DJs and music producers for the soundtracks of his games, including Ken Ishii, Tsuyoshi Suzuki, and Mondo Grosso. On July 7, 2007, the character Lumi from Genki Rockets (also the principal character from Child of Eden) opened the Live Earth concert in Tokyo in a holographic performance, and introduced a holographic video projection of Al Gore.

On September 20, 2012, a news article reported that "Tetsuya Mizuguchi has stepped away from games production, for the time being, taking on a more delegatory role within Q Entertainment."

Mizuguchi speaks English, and conducts the majority of his interviews with Western media exclusively in English.

He is a specially appointed professor teaching at Keio Media Design university.

=== Enhance, Inc. ===
In 2014, Mizuguchi left Q Entertainment and founded Enhance, Inc., where he is the CEO. He is the only employee of the company. His work under Enhance has included supporting updated versions of Rez and Lumines for modern systems.

Prior to the Electronic Entertainment Expo 2018, Sony announced Tetris Effect, developed by Enhance, to be released in late 2018 for PlayStation 4 and PlayStation VR. Mizuguchi had wanted for many years to produce a music-based game around Tetris, but its licensing had been held by Electronic Arts, making it difficult to use, which led him to develop Lumines instead. Around 2012, Mizuguchi began speaking with Henk Rogers, the founder of The Tetris Company that now owns the rights to Tetris. Mizuguchi and Rogers spoke to developing a version of Tetris set to music with a "zone" that players would achieve while playing, leading to the start of development of the game. Tetris Effect is inspired by the phenomenon known as the Tetris effect, where after playing Tetris for a long period of time, players would continue to see falling Tetris blocks for some time after quitting the game, an element related to the zone concept. Mizuguchi said that the goal of the game was "to amplify and enhance that same magical feeling where you just can’t get it out of your head, and not just the falling shapes, but all the visuals, the sounds, the music". The gameplay follows some of the core rules of Tetris where players try to place tetrominos in a playfield to clear complete lines, incorporating themes and music across thirty different stages with gameplay tied to the beat of the music. A "Zone" mechanic allows players to "stop time", allowing them to clear more than 4 lines at once. The game will include a meta-game leveling system for the player that will lead to new challenges as they progress.

=== Genki Rockets ===
In 2006, Mizuguchi pursued his love of technology and electronic music, founding the band Genki Rockets with a consistent group of collaborators, including songwriter and producer Kenji Tamai, as well as singers Rei Yasuda and Nami Miyahara. Mizuguchi would write all of the album's lyrics and contribute melodic ideas to Tamai, who would then work on the tracks in the studio. Described as a 'hybrid unit' by Mizuguchi, the vocals of the two singers were digitally combined to sound like one singer, while Rei represented the visual identity of the 'band.' Not unlike the band Gorillaz, Rei's alter-ego, 'Lumi,' was conceived as a 'virtual idol,' except in this instance, unlike Hatsune Miku, Lumi is based on a real human girl (Lumi would later go on to become a character in Mizuguchi's video game, Child of Eden). Genki Rockets has thus far produced two albums, Genki Rockets I: Heavenly Star and Genki Rockets II: No Border Between Us, consisting primarily of electronic pop music, sung mostly in English, with occasional Japanese phrases. Tamai's music company Agehasprings describes Genki Rockets as an early virtual YouTuber.

== Works ==
Year	Title	Role
1994	Megalopolis: Tokyo City Battle	Producer
1995	Sega Rally Championship	Producer
1995	Manx TT Superbike	Producer
1996	Sega Touring Car Championship	Producer
1998	Sega Rally 2	Producer
1998	Star Wars Trilogy Arcade	Project organizer
1999	Space Channel 5	Producer
1999	Shenmue	Special thanks (main scenario)
1999	D2	Special thanks
2001	Rez	Producer
2002	Space Channel 5: Part 2	Producer
2004	Lumines: Puzzle Fusion	Producer
2005	Meteos	Producer
2006	Lumines Live!	Producer
2006	Lumines II	Producer
2006	Ninety-Nine Nights	Producer, scenario, acting director
2006	Every Extend Extra	Executive producer
2006	Gunpey	Executive producer
2007	Every Extend Extra Extreme	Executive producer
2011	Child of Eden	Director, scenario
2018	Tetris Effect	Producer, original concept
2023	Humanity	Executive producer
2025	Lumines Arise	Producer
