= Lumines Live! =

2006 video game

- Developer: Q Entertainment
- Publisher: Microsoft Studios
- Director: Ryuichi Hattori
- Producer: Tetsuya Mizuguchi
- Designers: Katsumi Yokota; Osamu Kodera
- Programmer: Osamu Kodera
- Artist: Katsumi Yokota
- Series: Lumines
- Platform: Xbox 360
- Release: WW: October 18, 2006; JP: March 7, 2007
- Genre: Puzzle
- Modes: Single-player, Multiplayer

Lumines Live! (Note: Japanese: ルミネス ライブ!, Hepburn: Ruminesu Raibu!) is a 2006 puzzle video game developed by Q Entertainment and published by Microsoft Studios for the Xbox 360 via Xbox Live Arcade. It is the second game in the Lumines series, following 2004's Lumines: Puzzle Fusion. The objective of the game is to move and rotate 2×2 blocks to form colored squares of the same color. Points are awarded to the player when the Time Line erases the colored squares. Lumines Live! introduces online multiplayer, Xbox Live achievements, and a leaderboard.

During development, game producer Tetsuya Mizuguchi intended Lumines Live! to be customizable for players via downloadable content (DLC). One of the challenges during development was to have the game size be fifty megabytes due to Xbox Live's file size restrictions. It received several DLC packages between January and October 2007, a mobile phone port, and a physical edition compiled with Every Extend Extra Extreme and Rez HD in September 2009. The game received mixed reviews from critics, with some praising the new features, enhancements in performance, and visuals from its predecessor, but others raising complaints about the game's pricing and the amount of content in the base game.

== Gameplay ==
Gameplay of Lumines Live!'s Mission mode

Lumines Live! is a puzzle game similar to its predecessor, Lumines: Puzzle Fusion. The objective of the game is to rotate, move, and drop colored blocks varying between two colors to form 2×2 squares of the same color. A vertical line known as the Time Line sweeps over the playing field and will erase the colored squares, granting points to the player's overall score. Deleting four or more squares will add a bonus multiplier to the player's overall score. Players lose the game when the blocks reach the top of the playing field. Stages vary from thematic visual themes known as "Skins" that change the music, background, and sound effects. There are seven game modes: Challenge mode, Puzzle, Time Attack, VS CPU, and Duel Mode. In Challenge mode, players are tasked to survive as long as possible and gain the highest possible score. Puzzle mode tasks players to use the blocks to create specific shapes. Time Attack mode tasks players to clear as many squares as possible within an allotted time. Time Attack mode also allows players to share a recording of their best playthrough. In VS CPU mode, players share the playing field with an AI opponent and must defeat them by clearing more squares than them, causing players to claim more of the playing field. In Duel Mode, players can compete with each other either locally or online. Unlike its predecessor, Lumines Live! also allows players to accumulate over one million points in a play session.

Two new modes were introduced in Lumines Live!: Mission Mode and Skin Edit Mode. In Mission Mode, players are tasked to solve specific tasks that vary. In Skin Edit Mode, players can create their own custom playlist using skins previously unlocked in Challenge mode.

== Development ==
Lumines Live! was developed by Q Entertainment alongside Lumines Plus and Lumines II. Mizuguchi's concept for the game was that the game would feed the player with new songs, with a choice of downloads. Mizuguchi compared the game to TV channels where they direct the player to new content. During the development of Lumines: Puzzle Fusion, audio had to be completed before finalizing the skin's design. Music composer Yokota decided to take a different approach with Lumines II and Lumines Live!. Instead, skin designs took priority in order to provide more concrete suggestions for the audio. Yokota stated this made greater variation possible for the music tracks. Tetsuya Mizuguchi initially attempted to expand the multiplayer options by expanding it to play between four, six, and eight players at once however Mizuguchi didn't consider it to be fun and reverted to having only 2-player online mode. One of the challenges Q Entertainment faced was having the contents of the base game to the size of 50 megabytes or under due to Xbox Live Arcade's size restrictions emplaced at the time. Mizuguchi also chose to make the base game 50 megabytes to give freedom to customize the game using DLC for players.

== Release ==
The game was released worldwide on October 18, 2006. It was later released in Japan on March 7, 2007. To promote the game in Japan, a contest was held at the WOMB nightclub located in Shibuya, Tokyo on April 14, 2007. The contest was a tournament for who can clear the most squares within 60 seconds and the winner won an Xbox 360.

Six downloadable content packages and two individual skins were released for Lumines Live!. The first package titled, "Advance Challenge Pack" contains 20 skins, and was released on October 20, 2006, in Europe and on January 24, 2007, in North America. The second and third package titled, "Puzzle/Mission Pack" and "VS CPU Pack" respectively, were both released on January 24, 2007, for Europe and North America. "Puzzle/Mission Pack" contains 90 puzzles and 40 missions, and "VS CPU Pack" contains 9 opponents alongside their own skins and avatars. It also includes an unlockable skin that can be obtained if all opponents are defeated.

The fourth and fifth package titled, "Booster Pack" and "Tokyo Club Mix Pack" respectively, were both released on June 27, 2007. "Tokyo Club Mix Pack" contained skins in collaboration with DJ Sugiurumn, Techriders, DJ Malo, and Genki Rockets with the "Booster Pack" containing 20 skins including a skin based on Takagi Masakatsu's "Bloomy Girl" song. The sixth package titled, "Rockin' Holiday Pack" was released on September 24, 2007, and contains 20 skins based on Rez, Every Extend Extra Extreme, and previous Lumines titles. Two individual skins based on songs from Tetsuya Mizuguchi's band, Genki Rockets, were released as DLC. The first skin is the Heavenly Star skin previously in Lumines II and was released on January 24, 2007, for both Europe and North America. The second skin to be released is "Breeze".

A physical edition was released by Atari as part of a compilation alongside Rez HD and Every Extend Extra Extreme, titled Qubed. The Qubed compilation also contains all the DLC with the exception of the Booster Pack and Tokyo Club Mix Pack, which were available to be downloaded separately. The compilation was released on September 19, 2009. A mobile phone version of the game was released pre-installed on NTT Docomo's N-02B model on December 11, 2009.

== Reception ==
Reception

Aggregate score
Aggregator	Score
Metacritic	77/100

Review scores
Publication	Score
Eurogamer	7/10
GameDaily	3/5
GameSpot	6.6/10
IGN	7.8/10
Jeuxvideo.com	14/20
Official Xbox Magazine (UK)	7/10
Official Xbox Magazine (US)	8.5/10
TeamXbox	9.1/10
VideoGamer.com	9/10

Lumines Live! received "generally favorable reviews" according to the review aggregation website Metacritic. Critics praised the new features and updated visuals from the original but the amount of content in the base game versus the amount of DLC was criticized. Eurogamer were impressed with Skin Edit Mode, which helped returning players who didn't want to return to the beginning of Challenge Mode. GameSpot also praised the visuals and audio, stating they were better than the original game. IGN in particular praised the loading times, which were reduced from the original.

A common criticism for Lumines Live! was the pricing and amount of content of the base game. GameSpot found it offensive due to the base game charging full price. Eurogamer accused it for costing more than the average Xbox Live game in the market. Eurogamer further criticized the downloadable content being Mission mode and Puzzle mode levels that required little effort to make. Both GameDaily and IGN responded negatively to the game for being advertised as a full game. Official Xbox Magazine UK shared similar sentiments to GameDaily and IGN, and preferred it to be sold complete at a higher price instead of being asked to pay for additional packages upon release. In an early review, Official Xbox Magazine's U.S. version noted similar issues regarding DLC, but still praised the overall release and called it a great puzzle game.

In response to the criticism, Mizuguchi stated that he saw DLC as an unavoidable and growing trend, but that it also allowed players to customize their games as they wanted.

Since its release, the game sold 140,040 units worldwide by January 2011. Sales of the game moved up to 155,121 units by the end of 2011.
