= List of puzzle video games =

This is a partial list of notable puzzle video games, sorted by general category.

== Tile matching ==
Tile-matching video games are a type of puzzle video game where the player manipulates tiles in order to make them disappear according to a matching criterion. There are a great number of variations on this theme.

=== Falling block puzzles ===
Puzzle pieces advance into the play area from one or more edges, typically falling into the play area from above. Player must match or arrange individual pieces to achieve the particular objectives defined by each game.

- Alien Hive
- Baku Baku Animal
- Blueprint 3D
- Clockwiser
- Columns
- Dialhex
- Dr. Mario
- Dream of Pixels
- Drop Mania
- Faces
- Klax
- Lumines series
- Meteos
- Moujiya
- Oh My God!
- Pac-Attack
- Pnickies
- Puyo Puyo series
- Puzzlejuice
- Rampage Puzzle Attack
- Suika Game
- Super Puzzle Fighter II Turbo
- Super Swap
- Tactic
- Tecmo Stackers
- Tetris
- Trioncube
- Uo Poko
- Wario's Woods
- Welltris
- Wordtris
- Yoshi

=== Advancing blocks puzzles ===
Block-shaped puzzle pieces advance onto the board from one or more edges (i.e. top, bottom, or sides). The player tries to prevent the blocks from reaching the opposite edge of the playing area.

- Ball Fighter
- Collapse
- Critter Crunch
- Frozen Bubble
- Luxor series
- Magical Drop
- Magnetica
- Money Puzzle Exchanger
- Poker Smash
- Puzzle Bobble (a.k.a. Bust-a-Move)
- Puzzle League series
- Puzzle Link, Puzzle Link 2
- Quarth
- Snood
- Starsweep
- TiQal, also a rising block game
- Zuma

=== Other matching puzzles ===
- 2048
- Alchemy
- Bejeweled
- GNUbik
- Gunpey
- Gyromancer
- Hexic
- HuniePop, HuniePop 2: Double Date
- Loopz
- Perception
- Pixel Defenders Puzzle
- Piyo Blocks
- Plotting
- Prism
- Puchi Puchi Virus
- Puzzle Quest: Challenge of the Warlords, Puzzle Quest: Galactrix, Puzzle Quest 2
- Puzznic
- SameGame
- Sega Swirl
- Swing
- Wind and Water: Puzzle Battles
- Yoshi's Cookie
- Yosumin DS
- Zoo Keeper
- Zoop

== Logic puzzles ==
- Colour Cross
- Life Eater
- Mario's Picross
- Picross series
- Strimko
- Sudoku Gridmaster
- Suzuki Bakuhatsu

== Hidden object ==
- Black Box
- Criminal Case
- Drawn series
- Mystery Case Files series
- Minesweeper, MineSweeper3D

== Obstacle course navigation ==
- A Good Snowman Is Hard To Build
- A Monster's Expedition
- Archer Maclean's Mercury
- Atomix
- Baba Is You
- Ballance
- Bomberman
- Bonfire Peaks
- Castlequest
- ChuChu Rocket!
- Dash Galaxy in the Alien Asylum
- English Country Tune
- Enigma
- Golf Peaks
- Kuru Kuru Kururin
- Kururin Paradise
- Kururin Squash!
- Kye
- Lasertank
- Marble Blast Ultra
- Marble Drop
- Marble Madness
- Oxyd
- Patrick's Parabox
- Pico Park
- Polarium
- Pretentious Game
- Railbound
- Rush Hour
- Snakebird
- Sokoban
- Sokobond
- Stephen's Sausage Roll
- Switchball
- Theseus and the Minotaur
- XOR

== Single character control ==
- Adventures of Lolo and the Eggerland series
- Antichamber
- Banana
- Bobby Carrot
- Bombuzal
- Boulderdash
- BoxBoy! series
- Boxxle
- Braid
- Buster Bros. series
- Closure
- Cosmic Express
- Deadly Rooms of Death
- Diabolical Digits
- Eets
- ElecHead
- Faraway series
- I.Q.: Intelligent Qube
- Incredipede
- Interphase
- Islands of Insight
- Journey to the Planets
- Kickle Cubicle
- Krusty's Fun House
- Kula World
- Kwirk
- Limbo
- Lode Runner
- Magical Puzzle Popils
- Mind: Path to Thalamus
- Moai-kun
- Mole Mania
- Myst series
- Narbacular Drop
- Oddworld series
- Öoo
- Please, Don't Touch Anything
- Pneuma: Breath of Life
- Portal and Portal 2
- Pitman
- Pushmo series
- Pushover
- Q.U.B.E.
- Quantum Conundrum
- Repton
- Return of the Obra Dinn
- Scratches
- Scribblenauts
- Sheep, Dog 'n' Wolf
- Solomon's Key and Solomon's Key 2
- Stacking
- Superliminal
- Supraland
- Sutte Hakkun
- Teardown
- The Entropy Centre
- The Room series
- The Swapper
- The Talos Principle and The Talos Principle 2
- The Turing Test
- The White Door
- The Witness
- Toki Tori and Toki Tori 2
- Unmechanical
- Void Stranger

== Multiple character control ==
- Echochrome, Echochrome 2
- Fireboy and Watergirl in the Forest Temple
- Gobliiins!
- Humanity
- Mario vs. Donkey Kong (series)
- Pikmin
- Pingus
- Pitman (a.k.a. Catrap)
- Spirits
- The Brainies
- The Lost Vikings

=== Lemmings series ===
- 3D Lemmings
- All New World of Lemmings
- Christmas Lemmings
- Lemmings
- Lemmings 2: The Tribes
- Lemmings Revolution
- Oh No! More Lemmings

== Construction ==
- Amazing Alex
- Armadillo Run
- Bridge Constructor
- Crazy Machines, Crazy Machines 2
- Elefunk
- Fantastic Contraption (2008 video game)
- Fantastic Contraption (2016 video game)
- Pipe Mania
- Poly Bridge, Poly Bridge 2, Poly Bridge 3
- The Incredible Machine
- World of Goo, World of Goo 2

== Algorithmic ==
- 7 Billion Humans
- Human Resource Machine
- SpaceChem
- The Codex of Alchemical Engineering

== Multiple puzzle types ==
- 3 in Three
- Azada
- Big Brain Academy
- Blue Toad Murder Files
- Brain Age: Train Your Brain in Minutes a Day!
- Castles
- Dr. Brain series
- Faraway: Puzzle Escape
- Machinarium
- MILO
- Professor Layton series
- Puzzle Agent, Puzzle Agent 2
- Puzzle Panic
- Safecracker: The Ultimate Puzzle Adventure
- Smart Games Challenge series
- Strange Jigsaws
- The 7th Guest
- The 11th Hour
- The Daedalus Encounter
- The Dig
- The Fool's Errand
- WarioWare, Inc.
- Yohoho! Puzzle Pirates

== Collections ==
- Microsoft Entertainment Pack
- Microsoft Entertainment Pack: The Puzzle Collection
- Zillions of Games

== Other ==
- Blek
- Check Man
- Chocolate Castle
- CrossworDS (Nintendo DS)
- Cube Escape
- Devil Dice
- Dude, Stop
- Every Extend Extra
- Flow Free
- Gemsweeper
- Kula World
- Mr Driller
- No One Has to Die
- Photo Spot
- Shanghai solitaire
- SpellTower
- The Password Game
- Tricky Towers
- UFO: A Day in the Life
- Wandersong
- Wheel of Fortune
- Word War 5
