= Bonfire Peaks =

2021 puzzle video game

- Developer: Corey Martin
- Publishers: Draknek & Friends
- Platforms: Linux; macOS; Windows; Nintendo Switch; PlayStation 4; PlayStation 5
- Release: 30 September 2021
- Genre: Puzzle
- Mode: Single-player

Bonfire Peaks is a 2021 puzzle video game by Canadian indie developer Corey Martin. Gameplay involves moving boxes to traverse a 3D grid and burn the player character's belongings. Created as a prototype for 2018 game jam Ludum Dare 43, it was published by Draknek & Friends for Linux, macOS, Windows, Nintendo Switch, PlayStation 4, and PlayStation 5 in September 2021. The game received generally favorable reviews from critics and was nominated for "Best Indie Game" at the 2021 Golden Joystick Awards.

== Gameplay ==
Bonfire Peaks is a block-pushing puzzle game in the style of Sokoban. The player controls a character that can move forwards, backwards, turn, and carry boxes, but cannot sidestep. In each level, the player is presented with an 3D grid containing terrain, movable boxes, and a bonfire. One box represents the character's belongings, and the objective is to move that box into the bonfire, burning it. Typically, the bonfire is initially inaccessible, requiring the player to stack boxes in order to reach it. Later levels introduce elements including longer boxes, streams that move the character, and traps.

Individual puzzles are connected by a navigable overworld that presents players with several puzzles to solve at any given time. Most puzzles are not required; only about half of the puzzles need be solved. The overworld itself functions as a puzzle with the same box-carrying mechanic; completing individual levels rewards players with boxes that allow them to progress in the overworld.

The game allows the player to undo an unlimited number of actions, all the way to the beginning of a level.

== Development ==
Corey Martin is a Montreal-based indie developer. He initially developed Bonfire Peaks in November 2018 for game jam Ludum Dare 43, themed "sacrifices must be made". Subsequent development took about three years. Alan Hazelden of Draknek & Friends contributed to roughly double the number of levels, which total over 200. The game has an intentionally limited narrative, featuring neither dialogue nor expository text. According to Martin, "In my opinion, storytelling is not really a strength of the medium of games, or what excites me most about it".

The game was announced in January 2020 for a May 2020 release date, albeit with no publisher. It was eventually released by Draknek & Friends, a development collective which had previously released Cosmic Express and A Monster's Expedition. Before release, a demo was released on 1 October 2020. The game was released for Linux, macOS, Windows, Nintendo Switch, PlayStation 4, and PlayStation 5 on 30 September 2021. After release, a 3-part DLC, "Lost Memories", was announced, with the first part being released on 2 March 2023, and the later two parts being released on 29 May 2025.

== Reception ==
Reception

Aggregate score
Aggregator	Score
Metacritic	PC: 81/100; NS: 77/100; PS5: 86/100

Review scores
Publication	Score
Edge	9/10
Jeuxvideo.com	15/20
Nintendo World Report	7/10
PC Gamer (US)	79/100
Multiplayer.it	7.5/10
Vandal	8/10

Bonfire Peaks received "generally favorable" reviews according to review aggregator Metacritic.

Reviewers generally praised its art style, soundtrack, and atmosphere. PC Gamer praised the simple voxel art style, described the feel of the game as "meditative", and noted the game's inclusion of a dedicated button to make the character sit. Edge described it as "soulful", commenting that the art style complimented the game's mood and pacing: "That's in keeping with the melancholic mood, which in turn encourages the deliberate, methodical approach you need to reach the top". Vandal and Jeuxvideo complimented the soundtrack, noting that it fit the game's genre. However, PC Gamer found the game's attempts at telling a story through its environment lacking, Rock Paper Shotgun said "I'm having trouble connecting with its thoughtful story bits", and Eurogamer opined that its style was not for everyone.

The gameplay and difficulty received both positive and negative reviews. Edge described its difficulty as greater than that of A Monster's Expedition but lower than that of Stephen's Sausage Roll, and commented that the game had simple mechanics but "extraordinary variety". Others expressed frustration with the difficulty. Nintendo World Report said that the PlayStation version of the game had hints, but the Nintendo Switch version did not, making it more frustrating. Jeuxvideo expressed frustration that the game forced the player to learn obscure and misleading mechanics without explanation. Nevertheless, the level design received praise, with reviewers describing the levels as well thought out.

The control scheme was criticized. One common contention was that the movement controls were unintuitive, that they led to frequent mistakes, or that they were so limited as to break immersion. For example, Multiplayer.it found it cumbersome and absurd that the character could carry six boxes at once, but could only pick up boxes at the level of their feet. The publication also criticized the lack of a 360 degree camera in a 3D game.

The game was nominated for "Best Indie Game" at the 2021 Golden Joystick Awards.
