= LOK Digital =

2024 video game

- Developers: Letibus Design, Icedrop Games
- Publishers: Draknek & Friends
- Platforms: Windows; macOS; Linux; iOS; Android; Nintendo Switch; Nintendo Switch 2
- Release: Windows, Mac; 11 December 2024; Android, iOS; 23 January 2025; Switch, Switch 2; 10 December 2025
- Mode: Single-player

LOK Digital is a 2024 video game developed by Letibus Design and Icedrop Games and published by Draknek & Friends. It is a word-based puzzle video game in which players must fill a grid with words to help fictional creatures named Lok to build their civilisation. The game is based on a puzzle book created by Blaž Urban Gracar. Upon release, LOK Digital received positive reviews, with critics praising its challenge, puzzle design, and accessible pace and hint system.

== Gameplay ==
Completion of a level in LOK Digital requires players to fill all cells by selecting words.

Players support Lok, a new form of living being, by helping them understand their surroundings and expanding their civilisation. The objective of each level is to spell out words on a grid, turning them black. Once all cells on the grid are filled in black, the level is complete. Each word in the vocabulary has specific properties: for instance, spelling LOK fills in three squares and an additional square selected by the player, or TLAK four and an additional two. Later words, such as TA or LOLO, introduce more precise conditions for being spelled, and also discover additional interactions between letters; for instance, that the letter X can be used freely between the letters of other valid words. Completion of a set number of levels unlocks a new stage. The game features a hint system allowing players to see the series of words needed to complete a level. It also features a daily mode that provides players with a different daily challenge.

== Development ==
LOK Digital was based upon a puzzle book created by Letibus Design, the company of Slovenian artist Blaž Urban Gracar, who developed the game with Barcelona-based independent developer Icedrop Games. Gracar stated the puzzle concept for LOK was inspired by game designer Steven Lavelle, who had sent him word search puzzles in the artistic language Toki Pona, prompting thoughts on what a puzzle in a fictional language would look like. Ferran Ruiz Sala, a member of Icedrop Games, approached Gracar with a prototype of a video game around this concept, leading to development of the game shortly after release of the puzzle book. LOK Digital was the fourth title published by Draknek & Friends, a publisher led by Alan Hazelden. Draknek announced the game in April 2024 alongside the release of a game demo, and showcased the game at the Double Fine Day of the Devs in December of that year. The game was released for Windows and Macintosh on 11 December 2024, and ported to Android and iOS on 23 January 2025.

== Reception ==
Reception

Review scores
Publication	Score
Edge	8/10
Pocket Gamer	4/5

Edge praised the game's challenge in "how head-achingly difficult a small criss-cross of letters can be to decipher", although felt it was balanced by the generously limited conditions to progress in the game, and highlighted the introduction of additional words and concepts in extra stages. Despite not understanding the premise at first, Andrew Webster of The Verge came to enjoy the game more as a puzzle game than a word game, stating "while it can be difficult, the game does a great job of easing you a long", highlighting its slow pace, hint system and reference list of words. Similarly, Grayson Morley of Polygon considered the game's logic "takes on a life of its own" beyond a simple word search puzzle, enjoying its "absurd logic", although appreciated the hint system as he felt the game could "become overwhelming" in the later stages.
