= Asmik (disambiguation) =

Asmik may be:

- the short name of Asmik Ace, a Japanese entertainment company
- a spelling variant of the Armenian given name Hasmik; notable people with the name include:
  - Asmik Grigorian (born 1981), Armenian-Lithuanian opera singer
  - Asmik Shiroyan (born 1993), Armenian-Ukrainian singer and songwriter
- the name of a crater of Venus

== See also ==
- Asmic
