= Slave of God =

2012 video game

- Developer(s): Increpare
- Platform(s): Windows; Macintosh
- Release: 30 December 2012
- Mode(s): Single-player

Slave of God is a 2012 video game created by Increpare, the pseudonym of independent developer Steven Lavelle. The game is a first-person experimental game in which the player navigates a nightclub. Slave of God received praise from critics, with several highlighting the disorienting and hallucinatory qualities of the game's visuals.

== Gameplay ==
The setting and characters of Slave of God are distorted through visual effects.

Slave of God is a first-person game in which players navigate the interior of a club controlling the mouse. The game's visual presentation, portrayed through a fisheye perspective, create bright and flashing visual effects. Players can receive drinks from the bar and interact with other characters by giving them a drink, showing images above or behind those characters representing them imparting their life stories.

== Reception ==
Calling the title the developer's "best experimental game", Cara Ellison of The Guardian praised the game for its "eye-searing", "glorious" and "uncomfortable" qualities, stating the game makes the player "feel like you really have been drinking for the past eight hours". Ellison also praised the game in Rock Paper Shotgun as "wonderful" in "capturing the way music muffles and meanders in the brain when you are drunk under flashing lights. She later described the title as "one of the most profound games I've ever played". Phil Savage of PC Gamer found the game to be "disorienting" and "unsettling", considering it to convey "an emotional high to the sense bombardment" and "capture what's special about a room full of drunken, sweaty music lovers". Jeffrey Matulef of Eurogamer described the game as an experience "unlike anything else out there", although found its "cacophony of neon" was "bewildering to look at" and made it difficult to progress.

Several writers on game design have also discussed the qualities of Slave of God. Game researcher Brendan Keogh discussed the game's "intensity of feeling" and merit of facilitating a "direct experience" between its audiovisual design and the player, with the game's relationship between its visuals and movement becoming "physically exhausting" and directly evocative of the intended setting. Merritt Kopas praised the game's departure from photorealism as a first-person game, stating it "takes advantage of the spatial dynamics of the first-person genre to place the player in a state that might be experienced as anxious, ecstatic or something in between".
