= Strange Jigsaws =

2025 puzzle video game

- Developer: Fleb
- Publisher: Fleb
- Engine: Godot
- Platform: Windows
- Release: 7 August 2025
- Genre: Puzzle
- Mode: Single-player

Strange Jigsaws is a 2025 puzzle video game. The player solves a series of puzzles based on the general idea of jigsaw puzzles, wherein they rotate and assemble shapes into larger objects. This idea is extended and subverted throughout the game. The game was developed and published by Fleb, and was released in August 2025 for Windows. Reviewers praised its game design and puzzle design, and the game received an honorable mention for "Excellence in Design" at the 2026 Independent Games Festival.

== Gameplay ==
Strange Jigsaws is a puzzle video game. Conceptually based on jigsaw puzzles, Strange Jigsaws presents the player with a series of puzzles to solve based on the general premise of rotating and assembling shapes. The game subverts the traditional structure of jigsaw puzzles; for example, it tasks the player with solving a CAPTCHA by rotating user interface elements, or reassembling an anvil with puzzle pieces affected by gravity. To that end, the puzzles have been described as "jigsaws in name only".

The game consists of around 50 levels. Puzzles are nonlinear, some puzzles must be unlocked and some are metapuzzles.

== Development and release ==
Strange Jigsaws was developed by Fleb, a North Carolina, United States-based game developer and former electrical engineer. His first project was 20 Small Mazes, a maze-solving puzzle game; the reception to that game inspired him to become a full-time game developer. As inspirations, he cited puzzle hunts and escape rooms, as well as puzzle video games such as Portal, The Witness, Stephen's Sausage Roll, and Patrick's Parabox. The game runs on Godot.

The game was released on 7 August 2025 for Windows.

== Reception ==
Writing for Polygon, Raphael Bennett the game's vision and design, saying "It's a game that's both silly and warm, and simultaneously incredibly precise with just about every interaction".

Kotaku's John Walker described it as "stunningly clever and entertaining", finding it to subvert their expectations established both from the jigsaw puzzle genre and from 20 Small Mazes.

Aftermath praised the game design, describing it as playful and commenting that "FLEB loves puzzles, and that's obvious".

Thinky Games described the game as at first confusing, but later that "little clarities point in the same direction". They praised Fleb's puzzle design and considered the video game medium to have allowed the developer to explore different dimensions of the puzzle genre.

Multiple critics named Strange Jigsaws among the best puzzle games of the year. Strange Jigsaws received an honorable mention for "Excellence in Design" at the 2026 Independent Games Festival.
