= Mouja =

Mouja may refer to:

- Mouja, sometimes also called Moujiya or Moudjiya, a falling blocks puzzle game owned by Fujitsu
- Mouza, also spelled mouja or mauza, a type of administrative district in the Indian subcontinent
