= LaserTank =

1995 video game

- 9x9 sample of LaserTank — the real game is 16x16
- Developer: JEK Software
- Publisher: JEK Software
- Designer: Jim Kindley
- Platforms: Microsoft Windows; iOS
- Release: Microsoft Windows 1995 iOS February 1, 2015
- Genre: Puzzle
- Mode: Single-player

LaserTank (also known as Laser Tank) is a puzzle video game where the player must manoeuvre a tank to its goal in a minimum number of turns, with the power to destroy and move obstacles with a laser. The game is open source, careware, and can be obtained for free.

LaserTank is NP-complete, meaning that one can construct levels which are hard to solve for computers.

== Gameplay ==
LaserTank is played on a 16×16 grid. The player must use the tank to reach a flag in every level without dying. The player can move the tank in four directions and can fire a laser that is used to move or destroy objects. The number of moves and shots it takes to complete a level are recorded in a high score list. The scores are then compared with the current "Global High Score" file.

=== Expansion ===
Thousands of new levels can be downloaded. A level editor is available that has enabled players to create thousands of new levels. Players may upload their new levels for others to download and solve. Other tools are available that have enabled players to create many new LTG (LaserTank Graphics) visual themes. A setup tool for assisting in the updating of the game is also available, and is useful in that it keeps track of high scores and level modifications contained in downloaded updates. A number of other applications and downloads are available at the official LaserTank website.

=== Genres (level types) ===
The variety of objects within the game allows for the creation of a great variety of levels. Easy levels are grouped into a "Beginner" collection for younger or less-skilled players. Typical levels of varying difficulty are grouped into a series of "Challenge" collections. There is also a collection of levels requiring the pushing of blocks around, resembling another puzzle video game, Sokoban.

Another "Special" collection contains unconventional levels that are not typical of the game. Some may be repetitive. Other levels have been created that are machine-like, or function as virtual computers that perform simple mathematical calculations or sequential tasks. Some of these so-called special levels may only serve as demonstrations or artwork and may not even be solvable, since they may require more shots or moves than the game can record.

== Development ==
LaserTank was created by Jim Kindley (JEK Software), who started writing LaserTank in 1995. Kindley's main goal was to make the game for free but have people all over the world send levels to add to it. Kindley is not currently involved with LaserTank, but he once said in 2006: "Maybe someday I will re-enter the world of LaserTank". Donald Drouin of Canada is now the official LaserTank manager who gathers new levels and regularly updates the official LaserTank website, as well as providing interesting statistics to other players regarding current records and high scores.

A port for iOS was released on February 1, 2015, by Jack Powell. As of 2024, the app is no longer available on the store.

== See also ==
- List of puzzle video games
- Logic puzzle
- List of open source games
- List of freeware games
