= A Monster's Expedition =

2020 puzzle video game

A Monster's Expedition (Through Puzzling Exhibitions)
- Developers: Draknek & Friends
- Publishers: Draknek & Friends
- Producer: Syrenne McNulty
- Designer: Alan Hazelden
- Programmer: Benjamin Davis
- Artist: Adam deGrandis
- Writer: Philippa Warr
- Composer: Eli Rainsberry
- Engine: Unity
- Platforms: iOS; macOS; Windows; Linux; Nintendo Switch; PlayStation 4; PlayStation 5
- Release: 10 September 2020: iOS, macOS, Win; 10 September 2020; Linux; 20 November 2020; Nintendo Switch; 5 August 2021; PS4, PS5; 19 May 2022
- Genre: Puzzle
- Mode: Single-player

A Monster's Expedition (Through Puzzling Exhibitions) is a 2020 puzzle video game developed and published by Draknek & Friends. Gameplay involves exploring a series of islands by solving Sokoban-based puzzles. The player navigates a two-dimensional grid, rolling logs to create bridges and rafts to traverse between islands. The islands comprise a museum of human civilization, featuring exhibits of everyday objects, accompanied by humorous descriptions written from the perspective of an outsider. The game incorporates open world elements, having a nonlinear, branching path of levels, but is primarily a puzzle game. Developed over more than three years, the game was first released in September 2020 for iOS, macOS, and Windows, and later for Linux, Nintendo Switch, PlayStation 4, and PlayStation 5.

The game received positive reviews, especially on Nintendo Switch. Reviewers praised the puzzle design, describing the puzzles as elegant and conducive to being played in short sessions. They also complimented the game's method of introducing puzzle mechanics, and the general atmosphere, which they described as relaxing. The open world aspects of the game received mixed feedback, with some feeling that the player choice encouraged experimentation and avoided frustration, but others commenting that the game felt aimless or the difficulty arbitrary. Multiple publications listed A Monster's Expedition as one of the best games of 2020. The game received an honorable mention for the Seumas McNally Grand Prize at the 2021 Independent Games Festival, and was a finalist for several other awards.

== Gameplay ==
The player character pushes a log on an island. Other islands and a tree can be seen, and fog covers unexplored islands.

A Monster's Expedition is a puzzle video game where the player explores a series of islands. The islands are initially disconnected, and the player must solve Sokoban-based puzzles to bridge the gaps between them. Islands have trees which can be knocked over and moved as logs: small logs can be rolled as well as flipped end-to-end, and larger logs can be rolled but do not flip. Logs continue rolling until they are blocked by an obstacle or roll into the water. Logs rolled into the water can create bridges—and, later in the game, rafts—that allow the player to cross between islands. The game is set on a two-dimensional grid, and has a minimal set of controls: the player can move in four directions, undo their last move, or reset the current island. Interacting with objects, such as knocking down trees or rolling logs, is performed by walking into them.

The game incorporates open world elements, having a nonlinear, branching path of islands. There is no overt guidance for the player on where to go: the game does not indicate which island to proceed to next, or even if an island is reachable from the current one. There are hundreds of islands in total, divided into areas that, while not mechanically separate, are visually distinct, each featuring a distinct biome and aesthetic. Post boxes serve as fast travel points, allowing the player to quickly teleport between them.

The monster from A Good Snowman Is Hard to Build returns as the player character, who is exploring a museum of human civilization. Museum exhibits are scattered around the islands, and interpret everyday objects as they might look through the perspective of monsters, with the descriptions being humorous and often incorrect. For example, a zoetrope is described as "the earliest known perfectly looping gif format".

== Development and release ==
A Monster's Expedition was developed and published by Draknek & Friends, an independent game developer that had previously released A Good Snowman Is Hard to Build (2015) and Cosmic Express (2017). Development took more than three years. The development team consisted of creative director and lead puzzle designer Alan Hazelden, art director Adam deGrandis, lead programmer Benjamin Davis, composer and sound artist Eli Rainsberry, narrative designer Philippa Warr, and producer Syrenne McNulty. The game was prototyped with PuzzleScript, an HTML5-based engine for puzzle games, and the final game was written with Unity.

The development team attempted to make an open world game. The world's island-based structure was present from early in development, and early versions of the game focused more on adventure and exploration. The team felt this effort was ultimately unsuccessful, and described A Monster's Expedition as primarily a puzzle game, though the branching structure of the final game reflected its initial direction. With the design goal of creating a meditative game that could be played in short sessions, the team created a dynamic sound system that played parts of segments of the score that reflected the player's actions, and designed the art and text to create a calm atmosphere. Hazelden described the game as intentionally more accessible than his previous titles, which were noted for their difficulty.

Draknek & Friends first announced the game in March 2020 under the title A Monster's Expedition (Through Human Exhibitions), and showcased it at virtual game show Rezzed Digital in August 2020. The game was released on 10 September 2020 for Windows, and via subscription service Apple Arcade for iOS and macOS the same day. Native Linux support was added on 20 November 2020. The game was ported to Nintendo Switch, where it was released on 5 August 2021, alongside a content update titled "The Museum Update" for all platforms. It was later released for PlayStation 4 and PlayStation 5 on 19 May 2022. In June 2023, the game was removed from Apple Arcade, but later received a standalone release on iOS on 26 July 2023.

== Reception ==
Reception

Aggregate scores
Aggregator	Score
Metacritic	NS: 92/100
OpenCritic	100% recommend

Review scores
Publication	Score
Edge	8/10
Nintendo World Report	10/10
Pocket Gamer	4/5
Push Square	8/10
TouchArcade	5/5
Vandal	6.2/10
Good Game: Spawn Point	3/5

A Monster's Expedition received "universal acclaim" on Nintendo Switch, according to review aggregation website Metacritic. 100% of critics recommended the game according to OpenCritic.

Reviewers complimented the puzzle design. Push Square's Stephen Tailby called them simple and elegant. Joel Dewitte of Nintendo World Report described the puzzles as "airtight", and enjoyed that the small puzzles led to many small victories for the players. The undo and reset buttons were specifically highlighted by Chris Tapsell of Eurogamer as removing pressure from the puzzle-solving process and freeing the player to experiment. Writing for Vandal, Manu Delgado criticized the limited solutions to puzzles despite the game's presentation as open world.

The progression of the game drew mixed responses from reviewers. Edge found the game's introduction of its mechanics subtle, teaching the player to use advanced techniques without them realizing it. PC Gamer's Phil Savage opined that A Monster's Expedition's biggest strength was making players feel they had discovered mechanics themselves. Others found the puzzles' nonlinearity a major strength: Nadia Oxford of USgamer described the game as "free and open", and multiple critics cited its branching paths as helping to avoid player frustration by allowing them to solve different puzzles when stuck. Conversely, Angharad Yeo of Good Game: Spawn Point felt this contributed to a lack of direction, which she found frustrating, and Oxford criticized the game feeling aimless due to its lack of any journal or achievements. Some believed the difficulty was arbitrary: Tailby felt there were some puzzles with large spikes in difficulty, Edge commented that players could inadvertently encounter puzzles earlier than they would be prepared to solve them, and Delgado felt that the game did not progress in difficulty, but only became more overwhelming.

The Nintendo Switch version drew particular praise. Tapsell commented that the game's laid-back nature was well suited to the platform, and Shaun Musgrave of Touch Arcade felt that the game's structure was well suited to portable play, praising the touch controls and expanded content. Dewitte cited the "bite-sized" puzzles as creating small, incremental goals, creating a game that could be put down and picked up in small time increments.

Reviewers complimented the overall atmosphere of the game. Eurogamer found the game charming in its audiovisual design and mechanics, owing to a perceived lack of tension and an appeal to curiosity. Writing for Rock Paper Shotgun, Natalie Clayton complimented the craft of the game, citing the ability of the player to "wander as you please", the feeling which they described as "a sunny April morning", and the responsive soundtrack. Dewitte found that, while simple, the colorful world drew the player's focus to the game's puzzles, and especially liked that the music was synchronized to the player's actions. PC Gamer's Jonathan Bolding described the game as relaxing despite the level of challenge in the puzzles, owing to its "simple joy" and explorable world. Jupiter Hadley of Pocket Gamer found the game's writing style "hilarious". Clayton called the writing "both funny and critical", commenting that it built the game's world while poking fun at the difficulty of real-world archaeology.

=== Accolades ===
Some reviewers listed the game among the best of 2020, including Kotaku's Mike Fahey, PC Gamer editor-in-chief Phil Savage, and The New Yorker's Simon Parkin. It was ranked among the best mobile games by Campbell Bird writing for 148Apps in 2020, and Keza McDonald for The Guardian in 2021. At the 2021 Independent Games Festival awards, A Monster's Expedition was a finalist for Excellence in Design and Excellence in Audio, and was an honorable mention for the Seumas McNally Grand Prize. The game was nominated for Mobile Game of the Year at the 2020 Golden Joystick Awards, and was a finalist for Inclusivity at the 2021 Apple Design Awards.
