= Catrap =

1985 video game

- North American Game Boy cover art
- Developers: Sharp MZ; Yutaka Isokawa; Game Boy; ASK Kodansha
- Publishers: Sharp MZ; Softbank; Game Boy: JP: ASK Kodansha; NA: Asmik
- Designer: Yutaka Isokawa
- Composer: Masao Asakawa
- Platforms: Sharp MZ-700, Game Boy
- Release: Sharp MZ-700; 1985; Game Boy: JP: June 1, 1990; NA: October 1990
- Genre: Puzzle-platform
- Mode: Single-player

Catrap, known as Pitman in Japan and Power Paws in the United Kingdom, is a 1985 puzzle-platform game developed by Yutaka Isokawa for the Sharp MZ-700 computer. A port to the Game Boy developed by ASK Kodansha was released in Japan in June 1990 and North America in October 1990 by Asmik. ASK retained the rights to the game after splitting from Kodansha, re-releasing the game on the Nintendo 3DS Virtual Console in October 2011.

The word Catrap refers to the frequent number of times the player is trapped and needs to reverse their movements and the two anthropomorphic cats the player must maneuver to advance through the levels.

Destructoid credits the game with using a time-rewind mechanic before games like Blinx, Prince of Persia: The Sands of Time, and Braid. But the mechanic works only as an UNDO-function and doesn't involve any time-travel-based puzzle like in the other games.

== Gameplay ==
Catrap is a puzzle game. The player directs the avatar, an anthropomorphic cat, to navigate a room while clearing obstacles and kicking monsters and ghosts off the screen. Once the player has knocked all of the enemies off the screen, they advance to the next level. Advancement grows difficult for the player as increasingly intricate obstacles are presented to complicate the process of overcoming all of the monsters and ghosts. The game encourages trial and error. A player may try one combination of manoeuvres by moving the obstacle in one direction, then they may find themselves trapped. The player can hit the 'A'-button to reverse their movements and try again in a different way until they find the solution that enables them to access all of the enemies and knock them off the screen. Trial and error make up a large portion of the game. Players can also create their own mazes.

There are 100 levels for the player to clear, each one more difficult than the last with more room for error and typically take longer to complete. The first level involves no obstacles with one monster on the opposite side of the screen to knock off; the last level involves a blockade of boulders and a conundrum of ladders for the player to move and navigate to clear several floating ghosts, the most difficult level with the smallest margin for error.

== Development and release ==
The game concept was originally created in 1985 on a MZ-700 home computer by Yutaka Isokawa. The BASIC listing of the game was published in the August 1985 issue of the magazine "Oh!MZ Publications" as a type-in program. The popularity of the game caused it to be picked up for Game Boy conversion in 1990. In the Game Boy version there is a nod to the MZ-700 version, the layout of round 77 is a big M and Z. In 2004 it was released for I-mode mobile phones as Pitmania and Pitmania 2, with graphics more similar to the original MZ700 game. Pitmania 1 Infinite was released in 2007, which had improved and more colorful graphics. A version was released for the Nintendo 3DS as part of the Virtual Console service in October 2011 and for DSiWare in December 2011. In 2012 the game community restored a faithful as possible Sharp MZ-700 version from the available source code variants.

== Reception ==
Reception

Review scores
Publication	Score
Computer and Video Games	68/100
Famitsu	6/10, 7/10, 7/10, 4/10
GamePro	17/25
Génération 4	8/10
IGN	8.5/10
Nintendo Life	8/10
Retro Gamer	4/5
Total!	34/100
Family Computer Magazine	16.33/30
GB Action	75%
How to Win at Game Boy Games	B
Nintendo Magazine System	73/100
Power Play	66%
SNES Force	74/100
Super Gamer	56%
Top Secret	5/5

Catrap holds a rating of 8/10 on Nintendo Life and 5/5 on Arcade Spot.
