= Meteos =

2005 video game

- North American box art
- Developer: Q Entertainment
- Publishers: JP: Bandai; WW: Nintendo
- Director: Takeshi Hirai
- Producer: Tetsuya Mizuguchi
- Designer: Masahiro Sakurai
- Artist: Noboru Hotta
- Composers: Takayuki Nakamura; Kaori Takazoe
- Platforms: Nintendo DS, mobile phones
- Release: JP: March 10, 2005; NA: June 27, 2005; EU: September 23, 2005; AU: November 24, 2005
- Genre: Puzzle
- Modes: Single-player, multiplayer

Meteos (Note: Japanese: メテオス, Hepburn: Meteosu) is a 2005 tile-matching video game developed by Q Entertainment and published by Bandai for the Nintendo DS. Nintendo released the game outside Japan. It was produced by Q Entertainment founder Tetsuya Mizuguchi and designed by Masahiro Sakurai. Meteos was inspired by the video game Missile Command (1980), the film The Matrix (1999) and the television series 24 (2001-2010).

Gameplay requires the use of a stylus to move colored blocks called "meteos", which fall from the top of the screen. The game ends when the blocks fill up the screen; to prevent this from happening, the player must launch three or more blocks of the same color onto the top of the screen to make them disappear. Playable characters include thirty-two aliens and their respective planets.

Meteos received critical acclaim and reached number one in DS sales in the UK market during its first week, according to research company Chart-Track. It was compared to other puzzle games, such as Tetris (1985) and Lumines (2004). The game received awards and nominations from several publications, including the CESA Game Awards' Outstanding Performance Award. Versions were released for mobile phones and the Xbox Live Arcade in 2006 and 2008, respectively. A sequel, Meteos: Disney Magic, was released for the Nintendo DS in 2007.

== Gameplay and plot ==
Meteos screenshot, with the player battling three other planets

The core gameplay of Meteos, described as a "shoot-and-lift-up puzzle" game, requires players to use a stylus to move colored blocks—the eponymous "meteos" that fall from the top of the screen. Creating a vertical or horizontal line of three or more blocks causes the meteos to ignite and rise; they, or any blocks above them, disappear once they leave the screen. The speed and frequency of falling blocks can be adjusted with the "speeder" gauge. Power-ups may help or hinder the player or opponents; one example is a giant hammer that destroys multiple blocks with a few swings. The game ends if the blocks reach the top of the screen. Each block sent out of the playing field is cached in a virtual bank, from which the player can unlock new planets, aliens and sounds. The player can play as one of thirty-two aliens and their respective planets, each of which has a unique gravitational pull that affects the way the blocks launch.

The game has several modes; Star Trip, Simple, Deluge and Time Attack. Star Trip is Meteos' story mode; its plot centers on the evil planet Meteo sending its matter—the meteos—to other planets, killing life and destroying worlds. After three meteos fuse and launch themselves and other meteos into space, the civilizations on other planets plan a counterattack against Meteo. The player travels from planet to planet on the Metamo Ark, a warship made of metean ore. The story has branching paths, with the last level requiring the player to defeat Meteo itself. The Simple mode allows a quick play of the game while letting the player change the rules, such as the difficulty and the number of lives they can have. The Deluge mode lasts until the blocks completely fill the screen, "killing" the player. Time War has two goals; getting the high score in a limited time or launching as many blocks as possible from a set number. The game also has a multiplayer mode through Download Play; the player can send up to three other players a demo to play against each other with one game cartridge.

== Development and release ==
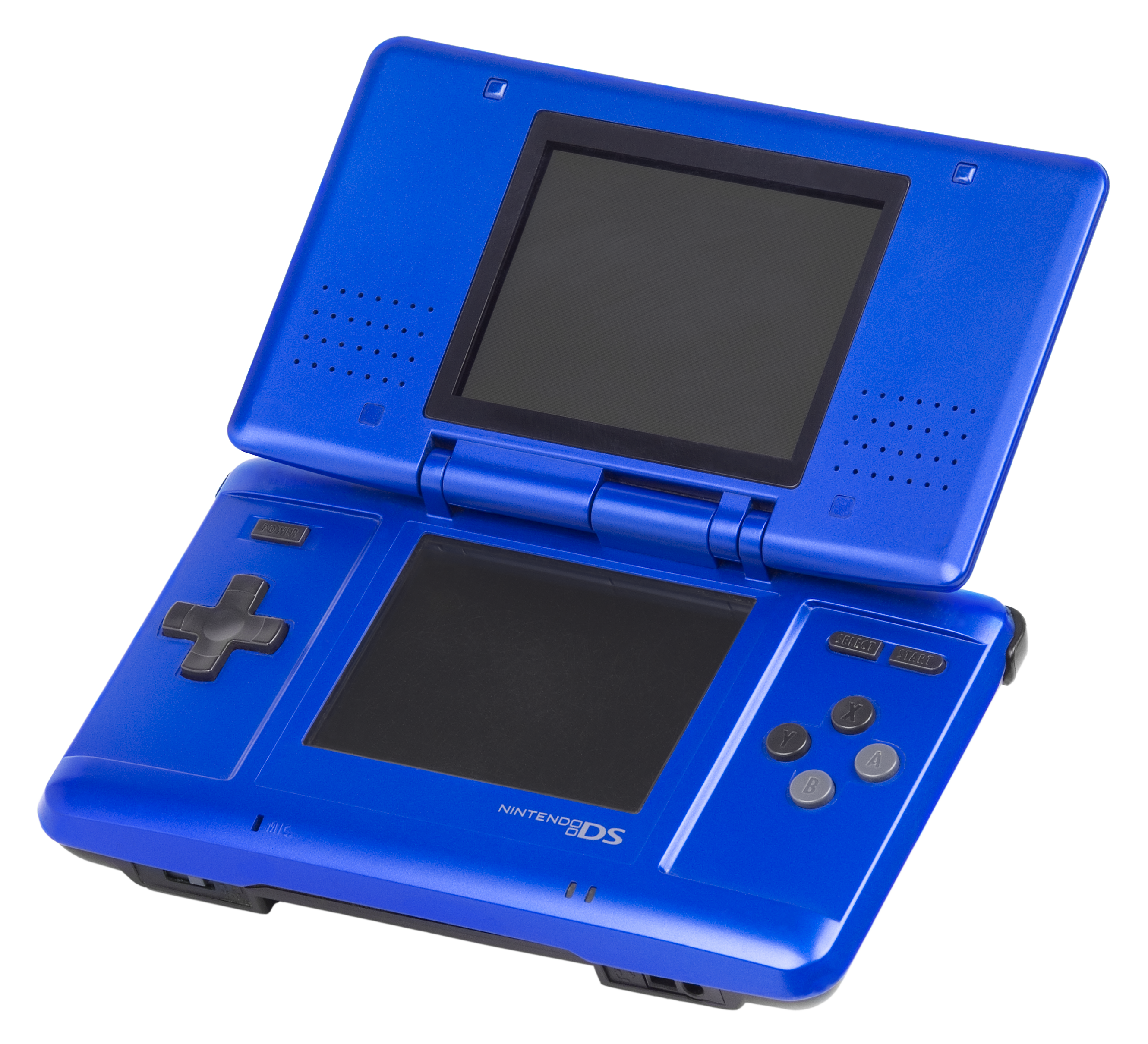
Meteos was developed for the Nintendo DS system.

Meteos was developed by Q Entertainment and released by Bandai in Japan and Nintendo in the United States. The game was first announced by Nintendo in August 2004; it was produced by Q Entertainment founder Tetsuya Mizuguchi, who also produced Sega's Space Channel 5 (1999) and Rez (2001). HAL Laboratory alumnus and creator of the Kirby series Masahiro Sakurai served as the game designer, and Takeshi Hirai was its director, while Takayuki Nakamura and Kaori Takazoe produced the game's soundtrack. The genres of music used for each planet include classical, country, pop and Balinese, and music reminiscent of that used in Space Invaders (1978).

The game was conceived when Tetsuya Mizuguchi asked Masahiro Sakurai to make a falling block puzzle. Believing the puzzle game genre had not evolved since Tetris Attack (1995), Sakurai originated the idea of having the blocks fall down and shoot back up. The game's prototype was created in three days by a designer, a programmer and a graphic artist; it was inspired by the television series 24, the film The Matrix and the video game Missile Command. According to Mizuguchi, 24's camera work and the beginning of The Matrix—in which green computer code cascades down the screen—served as the basis of the puzzle-game concept. In a Famitsu interview, Sakurai said the opening CG video explaining its backstory was added to provide a sense of the game's world.

The game was demonstrated at Nintendo's booth at E3 in 2005. Meteos' original Japanese release was scheduled for February 24, 2005. The release was postponed to March 10 due to last-minute changes; Mizuguchi was "reluctant" to change the date and apologized to fans. The game was released in the United States on June 27, in the United Kingdom on September 23, and in Australia on November 24 of that year.

== Reception ==
Reception

Aggregate score
Aggregator	Score
Metacritic	88/100

Review scores
Publication	Score
Eurogamer	9/10
Famitsu	38/40
G4	5/5
GamePro	4/5
GameRevolution	B+
GameSpot	8.5/10
GameSpy	4.5/5
IGN	9/10
Nintendo Power	9/10
Nintendo World Report	8.5/10
PALGN	9/10

Meteos generally received praise from video game critics; review aggregating website Metacritic recorded a score of 88/100. According to UK market research company Chart-Track, after three days of release the game debuted at number one in DS sales for the week of September 24, 2005. Chart-Track's 2005 sales report for the UK ranked the game 46th in the DS category, with sales of about 10,000 copies. By November 12, 2006, it had sold 57,880 copies in Japan. Game critics compared Meteos to other puzzle games, such as Tetris and Lumines—the latter also released by Q Entertainment for the PlayStation Portable.

Multiple reviewers praised the gameplay. IGN commended its gameplay modes for being individualized and distinctive, while G4 called its multiplayer mode "engrossing". Greg Kasavin of GameSpot also praised the single-player and multiplayer modes, though he described the gameplay to be "fun but formulaic". GameSpy's Phil Theobald criticized Meteos' stylus-driven control theme, considering it the game's chief flaw. A reviewer for Eurogamer noted the issue of "scrubbing", where scrubbing the lower Nintendo DS screen quickly with the stylus would cause Meteos to link together, calling this a "fundamental flaw" that would annoy players in multiplayer mode. Nintendo World Report also noted this "cheat", calling it "bothersome" to beginners. A review from Game Revolution was more critical, calling Meteos' plot "incomprehensible".

The game's visuals and soundtrack garnered praise; IGN described the in-game visuals as "sharp and colorful", and Chris Sell of PALGN noted the distinctive art design and characters. Sell also wrote that the soundtrack "fits the game like a glove", describing it as reminiscent of the soundtrack for Super Smash Bros. Melee (2001). The game's review from Nintendo World Report said music fans would likely find something they liked from the soundtrack's broad selection. According to a GamePro contributor, the soundtrack was fast and relies on sound effects, adding to the game's pace. Greg Kasavin called the soundtrack "outstandingly over-the-top" and said the game's premise justified its pace.

=== Awards and accolades ===
Meteos received awards and nominations from several gaming publications. It was nominated for the Game Critics Awards Best Puzzle/Trivia/Parlor Game at E3 2005, and was GameSpy and IGN's DS Puzzle Game of the Year that year. GameZone named Meteos the Best Puzzle for the DS, and it won the Best Music category at the 2006 Nintendo Power Awards. It was also one of thirteen games selected for the Outstanding Performance Award at the 9th CESA Game Awards.

Eurogamer, GamePro, and Nintendo World Report listed Meteos as one of the best Nintendo DS games; Eurogamer also named it one of 2005's best games. That year, Nintendo Power ranked the game 52nd on its list of the best games made for a Nintendo system. Pocket Gamer named Meteos one of the best puzzle games for the system in 2008, and IGN ranked it 71st on its Top 100 Modern Games list in 2011. After the announcement that the Wii U would be adding DS games to the system's Virtual Console, the GamesRadar and Nintendo Life websites said they wanted Meteos to be available on that platform.

Year	Award	Category	Result
2005	CESA Game Awards	Outstanding Performance Award	Won
2005	Game Critics Awards	Best Puzzle/Trivia/Parlor Game	Nominated
2005	GameSpy Game of the Year 2005	DS Puzzle Game of the Year	Won
2005	IGN's Best of 2005	DS Best Puzzle Game	Won
2005	IGN's Best of 2005	DS Game of the Year	Runner-Up
2005	Game Revolution's Best of 2005 Awards	Puzzle Game of the Year	Runner-Up
2005	5th Annual Louie Awards	Sleeper Hit	Runner-Up
2005	The 1UP Awards	Best Innovation	Nominated
2005	The 1UP Awards	Best Puzzle Game	Nominated
2005	GameSpot's Best and Worst of 2005	Best Puzzle/Rhythm Game	Nominated
2005	Spike Video Game Awards	Best Handheld Game	Nominated
2005	Spike Video Game Awards	Most Addicting Game	Nominated
2006	GameZone	Best Puzzle (DS)	Won
2006	GameZone	Best Multiplayer	Runner-Up
2006	Nintendo Power Awards	Best Music	Won
2006	IGN's Best of 2005	Overall Best Puzzle Game	Runner-Up

== Sequels and legacy ==
On September 7, 2005, the mobile-game publisher Gameloft announced they would bring Meteos and Q Entertainment's other puzzle game Lumines to cell phones. The game was released on March 30, 2006, as Meteos Astro Blocks. In 2006, Buena Vista Games announced they would publish four Q Entertainment games, including the then-unannounced sequel Meteos: Disney Magic, for the Nintendo DS.

Meteos: Disney Magic, developed by Platinum Egg and Aspect Co., follows Meteos' basic concept with a number of changes—most notably replacing the game's alien species with Disney characters. Mickey Mouse, Jack Sparrow and Winnie the Pooh are featured in the game, whose plot involves restoring order in a storybook vault after its contents are mysteriously rearranged. This sequel added a significant change in gameplay; the Nintendo DS was held sideways, creating a taller playing field on the touchscreen. Also, tiles could now be dragged left and right, whereas in Meteos tiles could only be moved vertically. Meteos: Disney Magic was released in North America on February 27, 2007, and in Europe on June 1 that year. It had a less-enthusiastic reception than its predecessor, with a score of 74 out of 100 from Metacritic. Phil Theobald of GameSpy enjoyed Disney Magic but thought the lowered difficulty made it less fun.

In 2007, Hangame released Meteos Online for PC in Japan. The free-to-play game, which offered online play for up to four players, was also planned for release on SoftBank cell phones. In 2008, Meteos Wars was released for the Xbox Live Arcade. The game included a two-player "versus" mode and customizable characters. Although it was originally planned for an October 2008 release, it was delayed until December 10. In 2009 two expansion packs for the game were available as downloadable content; the Planet Pack was released on January 21 and the Galaxy Pack on March 25; both with nine new planets. Meteos Wars was nominated as Best Family Game and Best Competitive Multiplayer Game for the second annual Xbox Live Arcade Awards. Chinese developer ShangDiHui released Mini Meteors, described by GameSetWatch as a Meteos clone, in 2011. In January 2015, the rights to Meteos and Lumines were bought from Q Entertainment by the Japanese smartphone developer Mobcast.
