= Blueprint 3D =

2011 video game

- Developer: FDG Entertainment
- Publisher: FDG Entertainment
- Platforms: iOS, Android
- Release: November 2011
- Genre: Puzzle
- Mode: Single-player

Blueprint 3D is a puzzle video game for iOS developed by German studio FDG Entertainment and published in November 2011. The object of the game is to rotate a seemingly random jumble of dots and lines in three dimensions until they resolve into a blueprint, a line drawing of an object. The player's score for each of the 240 levels is calculated based on the time needed to solve the puzzle.

== Reception ==
Critics reviewed Blueprint 3D favorably. Review aggregator Metacritic calculated an average score of 90% from six reviews as of 18 November 2011, which the site rates as "universal acclaim". The game's originality was particularly praised.

== See also ==
- List of puzzle video games
- 2011 in video games
