= Baku Baku Animal =

1995 video game

- North American Windows box art
- Developer: Sega
- Publisher: Sega
- Platforms: Arcade, Sega Saturn, Game Gear, Windows, Master System, mobile phone
- Release: April 1995: Arcade; JP: April 1995 Saturn; JP: November 10, 1995; PAL: May 1996; NA: June 19, 1996 Game Gear; JP: January 26, 1996; EU: July 1996; NA: 1996 Windows; JP: August 2, 1996; NA: September 5, 1996 Master System; BR: 1998 Mobile; JP: February 13, 2002
- Genre: Puzzle
- Modes: Single-player, multiplayer
- Arcade system: Sega Titan Video (ST-V)

Baku Baku, released in Japan as Baku Baku Animal, (Note: Japanese: ばくばくアニマル, Hepburn: Baku Baku Animaru) is a 1995 puzzle video game developed and published by Sega for Japanese arcades. It was later ported to the Sega Saturn, Game Gear, and Microsoft Windows, with the latter version being Sega's first network-compatible PC game. A Sega NetLink-compatible version of the game was also announced, but never released. The Japanese onomatopoeia "Baku Baku" roughly translates to "Chomp chomp".

== Plot ==
The King is hosting a competition to hire a royal zoo keeper for his daughter's numerous pets. The main character, Polly, must fight her way through other applicants to earn the position. Each opponent has an intro dialogue with different responses based on if the player wins or loses.

Bug: "How lucky, my opponent is only a little girl!" Polly: "Hmph! How rude! I'll show you who's the weak one!"

— Sega, Baku Baku Animal

== Gameplay ==
Arcade screenshot

Baku Baku Animal is a falling block puzzle game in which the player lines up falling animal and food tiles. When an animal is adjacently aligned to a tile of its favored food (e.g. monkey and banana), the animal eats the food. The number of connected food tiles eaten in one bite from an animal tile determines the point amount; more connected tiles means more points for the player. When animals eat food tiles, they also make random blocks fall in the opponent's area, right after the opponent's currently falling blocks. The object of the game is to make one's opponent unable to place more blocks.

== Reception ==
Reception

Review scores
Publication	Score
Electronic Gaming Monthly	7.375/10 (Game Gear)
GameSpot	7.8/10 (Saturn)
IGN	8/10 (mobile phone)
Maximum	4/5 (Saturn)
Next Generation	4/5 (Saturn)
Sega Saturn Magazine	90% (Saturn)

In Japan, Game Machine listed Baku Baku Animal as the eleventh most successful arcade game of May 1995.

The Saturn version was met with critical acclaim upon release, with Maximum calling it "the best 'next generation' puzzle game we've seen to date". Sega Saturn Magazine said the game had "some of the most addictive puzzle play since Tetris", and GameSpot called it "a must own" for "Saturn owners who have even a remote interest in puzzle games." GamePro called it "undeniably the best puzzle game in the world so far." Critics lauded the engaging gameplay, especially in two-player competitive mode, but the cute graphics and sounds were met with general approval as well.

Reviewing the Game Gear version, the four reviewers of Electronic Gaming Monthly commented that the gameplay concept of Baku Baku Animal is simple and accessible, yet has enough strategic possibilities to engage even veteran players. Andrew Baran summarized it as "non-threatening fun anyone can enjoy".

Baku Baku won Computer Gaming World's 1996 "Classic/Puzzle Game of the Year" award. The editors wrote, "The beauty of this game [...] lies in its ability to suck you in and keep you coming back for more and more. If you haven't already tried it, beware: Baku Baku will eat up your time." It was a finalist for the Computer Game Developers Conference's 1996 "Best Trivia or Puzzle Game" Spotlight Award, but lost the prize to You Don't Know Jack XL. Electronic Gaming Monthly named the Game Gear version a runner-up for "Hand-Held Game of the Year" and the Saturn version a runner-up for "Puzzle Game of the Year" (beaten in both cases by Tetris Attack).

Baku Baku Animal was named the 72nd best computer game ever by PC Gamer in 1997.

== Other media ==
A white label 12-inch EP consisting entirely of dance tracks using sound effects from Baku Baku Animal, recorded by The Dream Team and Timebase for the Suburban Base label, was circulated to disc jockeys in 1996.

Additional evidence for the popularity of Baku Baku Animal is its use as an example of a falling-block puzzle game (a sub-genre of the tile-matching video game). A 1997 The Psychologist article about video game violence used it to describe puzzle games along with Tetris. In a 2007 article titled Swap Adjacent Gems to Make Sets of Three: A History of Matching Tile Games (Figure 3), its legacy is noted within the history of tile-matching video games. Author Jesper Juul states Baku Baku Animal's gameplay rule ("special objects to match") distinguishes it from previous titles.

Super Puzzle Fighter II Turbo was compared to Baku Baku Animal in Sega Saturn Magazine: "The bottom line is that Super Puzzle Fighter II X is a brain-rending game of skill and cunning, which is effectively a remake of Baku Baku Animal, albeit one with some of the best presentation ever seen in the hotly contested field of Sega Saturn puzzle games."

== See also ==
- List of puzzle video games
- 1995 in video games
