= Machiko Toyoshima =

Japanese actress

- 豊嶋 真千子
- Born: December 28, 1971 (age 54); Ibaraki Prefecture, Japan
- Education: Meiji University
- Occupations: Actress; voice actress; singer
- Years active: 1994–present
- Agent: Aoni Production
- Notable work: Money Puzzle Exchanger as Lulula Franc
- Height: 151 cm (4 ft 11 in)
- Website: https://machirin.net/

Machiko Toyoshima (豊嶋 真千子, Toyoshima Machiko; born on December 28, 1971) is a Japanese actress, voice actress and singer from Ibaraki Prefecture, Japan.

== Biography ==
She was known for her role as Lulula Franc, a Cherrybaiter in 1997 Face/SNK's Neo Geo puzzle game Money Puzzle Exchanger.

== Filmography ==
=== Television animation ===
- Pocket Monsters (1997) – Kasumi's Tattu (Misty's Horsea)
- One Piece (1999) – Kuina
- Pocket Monsters Side Stories (2002) – Kasumi's Tattu (Misty's Horsea) and Sakura's Agehunt (Sakura's Beautifly)
- World Trigger (2014) – Kaho Mikami
- Chibi Maruko-chan (2016) – Sakiko Sakura, Uchida, Wakabayashi – replaced Yuko Mizutani

Unknown date

- Hunter × Hunter (Second Series) – Asta and Khara
- Gitaroo Man – Pico and Kirah
- Ground Defense Force! Mao-chan – Emi Uehara and Shoko Akasaka
- Growlanser & Growlanser II: The Sense of Justice – Misha
- Konjiki no Gash Bell!! – Shion Hibiki
- Sailor Moon SuperS – PallaPalla
- Saint Seiya Hades Chapter – young Phoenix Ikki
- Weiß Kreuz Glühen – Asami-sensei
- Mermaid Saga – Toukichi
- Cyborg 009 – Francois Alnul/Cyborg 003

=== Original video animation ===
- Kirara (2000) – Amy

=== Animated films ===
- Street Fighter II: The Animated Movie (1994) – Indian girl

=== Video games ===
- Money Puzzle Exchanger (1997) – Lulula Franc/Cherrybaiter
- Sentimental Graffiti (2001) – Manami Sugihara
- Reveal Fantasia (2002) – Fiona
