= Poly Bridge =

Video game series by Dry Cactus

- Genres: Simulation, puzzle
- Developer: Dry Cactus
- Publisher: Dry Cactus
- Composer: Adrian Talens
- Platforms: Android; iOS; Linux; macOS; Microsoft Windows; Nintendo Switch
- First release: Poly Bridge; 12 July 2016
- Latest release: Poly Bridge 3; 30 May 2023

Poly Bridge is a simulation-puzzle video game series developed and published by Dry Cactus. The franchise was introduced in 2016 and received three installments, with the third title, Poly Bridge 3, released on 30 May 2023.

== Games ==
Release timeline
2016	Poly Bridge
2017
2018
2019
2020	Poly Bridge 2
2021
2022
2023	Poly Bridge 3

=== Poly Bridge (2016) ===
The first installment of the series started with an early access on Steam in 2015. The game was fully released initially for Microsoft Windows on 12 June 2016. The basic material includes steel, wood, rope, and cable, alongside hydraulics, which can be used to move pieces of the bridge.

=== Poly Bridge 2 (2020) ===
The second installment of the series was released on 28 May 2020 for Linux, macOS and Microsoft Windows via Epic Games Store and Steam. Android and iOS versions were available in October 2020. The game features a new material, spring.

=== Poly Bridge 3 (2023) ===
A third title was revealed on 16 March 2023, targeting for a release on 30 May 2023 for Linux, macOS and Microsoft Windows platforms. Foundation is confirmed to be introduced as a new material.

== Reception ==
Aggregate review scores As of 17 March 2023.
Game	Year	Metacritic
Poly Bridge	2016	73/100
Poly Bridge 2	2020	69/100

The series has sold over 6 million copies prior to the release of Poly Bridge 3.
