= Diabolical Digits =

- Developer: Créalude
- Publishers: FR: CFI; NA: Millennium Media Group, Dell Magazines
- Designer: Pierre Berloquin
- Platforms: Macintosh, Windows
- Release: March 1, 1995
- Genre: Mathematical puzzle
- Mode: Single-player

Diabolical Digits is a mathematical puzzle video game designed by French puzzle master Pierre Berloquin and developed by Créalude for Windows and Macintosh. It was originally published in France by CFI in March 1995 as Digi Folies. A North American version was distributed by Millennium Media Group and Dell Magazines at the end of the year.

== Gameplay ==
Diabolical Digits is a mathematical puzzle game in which the player arranges numbers on a grid so that none of the numbers are adjacent to the same number or to a number from which it differs by one.

== Reception ==
Reception

Review scores
Publication	Score
Computer Game Review	73/100
Next Generation	2/5 stars

Next Generation rated it two stars out of five, and stated that "It might be good for very young children who are just learning their numbers, but for anyone above the age of eight, the game is underwhelming." A trio of reviewers for Computer Game Review gave the game an average of 73 out 100, summarizing it as terrific for younger players, particularly math students, but that it can boring quickly and that there are few goals other to beat ones own high score. Computer Games Strategy Plus writer Steve Bauman echoed this last criticism, but noted "the graphics are sharp, the gameplay entertaining but not particularly deep and there's plenty of challenge to be had." Marilyn A. Gillen of Billboard asserted that the addition of more complex rules, spiraling grids, and hidden spatial elements made the game appropriate for all ages. PC Magazine writer Shane Mooney similarly found the game a good choice for those that "really want to feel that cranial burn" due to the sheer number of challenges and rule variations.

== See also ==
- Word War 5, another puzzle game from the same designer and developer
