= Öoo =

2025 video game

- Developer: Nama Takahashi
- Artist: Hachinos
- Composer: Tsuyomi
- Platforms: Windows; Nintendo Switch; PlayStation 5; Xbox Series X/S
- Release: 7 August 2025: Windows; WW: 7 August 2025; Nintendo Switch; WW: 3 March 2026; PlayStation 5; WW: 11 March 2026; Xbox Series X/S; WW: 18 March 2026
- Genre: Puzzle-platform
- Mode: Single-player

Öoo (Note: Takahashi has stated that while there's "no official pronunciation" of the name, he suggested the game's name to be pronounced phonetically as [øu].) is a 2025 puzzle-platform video game developed by Japanese independent developer Nama Takahashi. Players place and explode bombs to traverse a 2D side-scrolling world in creative ways. Takahashi stated the game was created as a means to explore and experiment with creating a puzzle game that oriented around a single gameplay mechanic. Upon release, the game received positive reviews, with critics praising the game's complex puzzle design, use of open-ended experimentation to find solutions, and short length.

== Gameplay ==
Gameplay screenshot

Players assume the role of a caterpillar whose segments are made out of bombs. The caterpillar cannot jump, but it can place a bomb and then detonate it at will. The explosions can destroy certain walls and propel the player to traverse the game world. As the game progresses, the player collects a second bomb, allowing more flexible traversal. Checkpoints allow the player to return to a previous point if they become trapped or die from touching hazards, including spikes. To progress, players also need to collect and deliver fly-like creatures to frogs that block their path. The game features hidden areas and passages. Without in-game text or tutorials, many of the behaviours of the bombs and the pathways to progress are not signalled to players, requiring them to experiment or backtrack with what they have learned in the game to progress.

== Development ==
Öoo was developed by Japanese independent game developer Nama Takahashi, who previously developed the game ElecHead. The game's pixel art was created by artist Hachinos. Takahashi stated the game's concept came from practical and personal motivations, aiming to "thoroughly experiment with a single mechanic", whilst also allowing "for a wide range of gameplay experiences while keeping the development workload manageable". A game demo was released for Steam Next Fest in June 2025.

Öoo was released on the Nintendo Switch on 3 March 2026, with the PlayStation 5 and Xbox Series X/S versions releasing later the same month on 11 March and 18 March respectively. The console versions were published by AMATA Games.

== Reception ==
Reception

Aggregate score
Aggregator	Score
OpenCritic	100% recommend (Note: Based on 7 reviews)

Several critics named Öoo as one of the best titles of the year, comparing it to titles including Animal Well and Celeste. Critics praised the puzzle game design. Many appreciated how the game required players to experiment with mechanics to find solutions, with Moises Taveras of The A.V. Club stating the game is "constantly teaching the player to throw away what they believe to be the conventions of platforming logic, and think outside the box in order to make breakthroughs". The game's short length and focus on its key mechanics were praised. John Walker of Kotaku said the game's lack of upgrades or additional bombs focused on demonstrating "imagination for how [the bombs] can be used in ever-more interesting ways". Inverse similarly observed that the game's "genius puzzle design" introduced new mechanics and solutions "with just two buttons and not a single word". Kris Holt of Engadget commended the "thought, care and detail" behind the game's design. Praise was also directed to the game's visual and audio design, with Inverse praising the "cheerful and clean" art and the use of theme variation in the game's soundtrack.

The Academy of Interactive Arts & Sciences nominated Öoo for Outstanding Achievement in Game Design at the 29th Annual D.I.C.E. Awards.

== See also ==
- ElecHead
