= Piyo Blocks 2 =

2009 video game

- Developer(s): Big Pixel Studios
- Publisher(s): Big Pixel Studios
- Platform(s): Android, iOS
- Release: 1 April, 2010
- Genre(s): Puzzle
- Mode(s): Single-player

Piyo Blocks 2 is a puzzle video game developed by the Big Pixel Studios. The game was released for Android and iOS on 1 April, 2010. It is a sequel to Piyo Blocks, which was released on October 12, 2009.

== Gameplay ==
The aim of the game is to swap Piyo Blocks that are adjacent to each other in order to create three of the same type in a row.

== Reception ==
On Metacritic, Piyo Blocks 2 has a rating of 90% based on four critics.

Multiple critics gave positive reviews.
