= ElecHead =

2021 video game

- Developer: Nama Takahashi
- Publisher: Nama Takahashi
- Composer: Tsuyomi
- Engine: GameMaker
- Platforms: Windows; Nintendo Switch; Xbox One; Xbox Series X
- Release: Windows: WW: 14 October 2021; Nintendo Switch: WW: 23 June 2022; Xbox: WW: 23 March 2023
- Genre: Puzzle-platform
- Mode: Single-player

ElecHead is a 2021 puzzle-platform game developed and published by Japanese indie developer Nama Takahashi. The player controls Elec, a small robot character whose head electrically charges any surface it touches, to progress through puzzles. It was released on 14 October 2021 for PC, followed by a release on the Nintendo Switch on 23 June 2022 and the Xbox One on 23 March 2023.

The music and sound design was created by composer Tsuyomi.

== Gameplay ==
ElecHead's controls involve two-dimensional movement and jumping. Elec, the player character, electrically charges all surfaces on contact, causing them to glow yellow. Electricity can activate various platforms and hazards, such as blocks with dotted outlines that appear when charged, lifts that move in a particular direction, and light bulbs that emit deadly electric currents. These mechanics are used to create puzzles that the player must complete in order to traverse between rooms, with some puzzles spanning multiple rooms.

Early in the game, the player is additionally granted the ability to throw the character's electrically-charged head a certain distance away. This allows the player to control the body, which does not conduct electricity. Failure to retrieve the head after ten seconds results in the player dying and respawning.

The levels are divided into six stages, all of which begin with a warp that can be accessed at any time via the pause menu; using the warp system is sometimes required to solve puzzles. Checkpoints are also used as a puzzle mechanic, where checkpoints occasionally need to be avoided.

The game features two possible endings. One of them, accessed by reaching the end of the game as usual, results in Elec powering a device that blows up the space station that the game takes place in. The other ending is unlocked after collecting all twenty data chips, in which a door opens at the beginning of the sixth stage leading to an ending in which Elec activates a large cannon that destroys the Earth.

Hidden throughout the game's levels are optional collectibles that change the color palette.

== Development ==
ElecHead was originally created as a prototype for a game jam equivalent in 2016, before eventually being expanded into a full release. There were originally ten stages, but it was cut down to six during development.

=== Release ===
It was released on 14 October 2021 for PC, followed by a release on the Nintendo Switch on 23 June 2022 and the Xbox One on 23 March 2023. It was originally released while the developer was still studying at a game design school.

== Reception ==
Reception

Aggregate score
Aggregator	Score
Metacritic	84/100

Review scores
Publication	Score
Eurogamer	Recommended
Nintendo Life	8/10
Nintendo World Report	8.5/10

ElecHead received an honorable mention for the "Best Debut" category during the 22nd Game Developers Choice Awards, and it was also nominated for the "Best Game" award at the 2022 GameMaker awards. The game's original prototype was nominated for the "Award for Excellence" in the amateur division of the 2016 Japan Game Awards. It received "generally favorable" reviews according to the review aggregator Metacritic.

Christian Donlan of Eurogamer described it as "ingenious, but also compact", suggesting that it "guides you [and] prompts you to be at your cleverest". Katharine Castle of Rock Paper Shotgun wrote that it was "an absolute treat from start to finish".

Derek Yu, the developer of Spelunky, referred to it as "a puzzle platformer masterpiece that pushes its unique mechanic to its limits, leading to many ‘Aha!’ moments", and it has also received praise from the developers of Downwell, Celeste, and VVVVVV.

== See also ==
- Öoo
