= Asmic =

Chemical compound

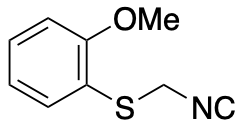

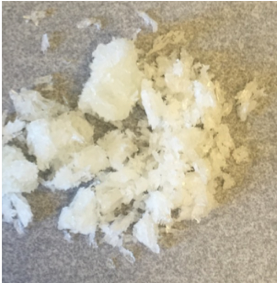

Names
- Preferred IUPAC name 1-[(Isocyanomethyl)sulfanyl]-2-methoxybenzene
- Other names Asmic; Anisyl sulfanyl methyl isocyanide

Identifiers
CAS Number	1803329-89-6
3D model (JSmol)	Interactive image
ChemSpider	114826701
ECHA InfoCard	100.402.334
EC Number	972-307-6
PubChem CID	123978413
CompTox Dashboard (EPA)	DTXSID101336465
- InChI: InChI=1S/C9H9NOS/c1-10-7-12-9-6-4-3-5-8(9)11-2/h3-6H,7H2,2H3 Key: JNVYKHCAQCKTBG-UHFFFAOYSA-N
- SMILES: COC1=CC=CC=C1SC[N+]#[C-]

Properties
Chemical formula	C_{9}H_{9}NOS
Molar mass	179.24 g·mol^{−1}
Appearance	white solid
Melting point	27 °C (81 °F; 300 K)
Solubility in polar organic solvents	Soluble

Hazards
- GHS labelling
Pictograms	(GHS06: Toxic) (GHS07: Exclamation mark)
Signal word	Warning
Hazard statements	H301, H311, H315, H319, H331, H335
Precautionary statements	P261, P262, P264, P264+P265, P270, P271, P280, P301+P316, P302+P352, P304+P340, P305+P351+P338, P316, P319, P321, P330, P332+P317, P337+P317, P361+P364, P362+P364, P403+P233, P405, P501
- Except where otherwise noted, data are given for materials in their standard state (at 25 °C [77 °F], 100 kPa). Infobox references

Anisyl sulfanyl methyl isocyanide (Asmic) is an organic compound with the formula CH_{3}OC_{6}H_{4}SCH_{2}NC. The molecule contains an ortho-methoxy-phenyl sulfide group to which is attached the isocyanide. Asmic is used as a reagent for the synthesis of tri-substituted isocyanides. The compound is a colorless although samples can appear off-white.

== Preparation and reactions ==
Asmic is prepared by dehydration of the corresponding formamide by POCl_{3}.

Asmic can be deprotonated at the methylene adjacent to the isocyanide. The anionic form of Asmic, which is stable at low temperatures, can be alkylated with a variety of electrophiles. Two sequential deprotonation-alkylation reactions and a subsequent sulfur-lithium exchange reaction allow the synthesis of tri-substituted isocyanides.

The ortho-methoxy-phenyl sulfide group is thought to facilitate deprotonation by chelating to metalated bases allowing for the base to achieve optimal trajectory during the deprotonation.

Asmic can be used to prepare oxazoles by condensation reactions with esters. The ortho-methoxy-phenyl sulfide group can also undergo sulfur-lithium exchange, and likely proceeds via a 10-s-3 sulfuranide.

== Related compounds ==
- TosMIC
