= Word War 5 =

1995 video game

- Developer: Créalude
- Publishers: FR: CFI; NA: Millennium Media Group, Merriam-Webster
- Designer: Pierre Berloquin
- Platforms: Macintosh, Windows
- Release: March 1, 1995
- Genre: Puzzle
- Mode: Single-player

Word War 5 is a word puzzle compilation video game designed by Pierre Berloquin and developed by Créalude for Macintosh and Windows. The game was distributed in North America by Millennium Media Group and Merriam-Webster in 1995.

== Gameplay ==
Word War 5 is an assortment of five word games involving the creation of five-letter words. "Word Targets" has the player creating words from letters floating across the screen, earning ten points for every approved word. "Crossword" is a crossword puzzle in which three words must be uncovered by rearranging their letters. "Odd One Out" has the player pick out a word that deviates from four others in some way. "Spinning Letters" requires composing words from given definitions. Finally, "Snake" is a variation of the game of the same name where the player must try to avoid obstacles which cause letters to be lost. Online hints and definitions are readily available during gameplay but deduct from one's score. Each game has five difficulty levels and can be played in one of five languages: English, Spanish, French, German, and Italian.

== Development and release ==
Word War 5 was designed by Pierre Berloquin, who had been creating puzzles for 30 years at the time and had authored several books on the subject. The game was developed by French studio Créalude. It was initially released in France by CFI on Macintosh and Windows on March 1, 1995. It was later distributed in North America by Millennium Media Group and Merriam-Webster of dictionary fame.

== Reception ==
Reception

Review scores
Publication	Score
Computer Game Review	86/100
Next Generation	2/5
Software Gids	37/50

Computer Game Review gave the game an overall score of 86 out of 100, summarizing, "sure to provide many hours of educational entertainment for kids and adults of all ages."

Next Generation rated it with two stars out of five, and stated that "Crealude's World War 5 is an obscure, weird, and severe edutainment misfire."

PC Gamer called the game a "brainteaser for word lovers", praising the soundtrack and stylized graphics.

Computer Games Strategy Plus found the games "simple to understand but nearly impossible to explain" and recommended it to puzzle fans.

Sun Sentinel called it "a mixed bag of mind-benders", noting the option to play in five different languages.

== See also ==
- Diabolical Digits, another puzzle game from the same designer and developer
