= Hasmik =

Hasmik is an Armenian feminine given name. It may refer to:

- Hasmik Harutyunyan (born 1960), Armenian folk singer
- Hasmik Karapetyan (born 1977), Armenian pop singer
- Hasmik Papian (born 1961), Armenian soprano
- Hasmik Poghosyan (born 1960), Armenian politician, Armenian Minister of Culture (2006–2016)
- Hasmik (actress), stage name of Armenian actress Taguhi Hakobyan (1878–1947)
