= Sokobond =

2013 video game

- Designers: Alan Hazelden; Harry Lee
- Programmer: Alan Hazelden
- Artist: Harry Lee
- Composer: Allison Walker
- Platforms: Linux; OS X; Microsoft Windows; Nintendo Switch; iOS; Android
- Release: Linux, OS X, Windows; 27 August 2013; Nintendo Switch; 2 September 2021; iOS, Android; 19 May 2022
- Genre: Puzzle
- Mode: Single-player

Sokobond is a puzzle video game created by Alan Hazelden and Harry Lee. Gameplay involves moving atoms around 2D grids to form chemical compounds. The game was released on Linux, OS X, and Windows in August 2013. It was later released for Nintendo Switch in September 2021, and iOS and Android in May 2022. The game received generally favorable reviews from critics.

== Gameplay ==
Sokobond is a Sokoban-style puzzle video game themed around creating chemical compounds from atoms. In each level, the player is presented with a 2D grid containing walls and atoms. The player controls one of the atoms, and moves it around the level. Moving atoms next to each other bonds them, and the two atoms then move together as a compound. There are five elements introduced: carbon, nitrogen, oxygen, hydrogen, and helium, able to form four, three, two, one, and zero bonds respectively.

There are a total of 105 levels, grouped into sections with themed challenges. Mechanics introduced in later sections include introducing objects that can remove bonds, increase the order of a bond, or rearrange bonded molecules.

== Development and release ==
Sokobond was created by independent developers Alan Hazelden and Harry Lee. The game's music was composed by Allison Walker. The game was released on Linux, OS X, Windows-based personal computers on 27 August 2013. The game was later released on the digital distribution service Steam, after being greenlit by the community. On 2 September 2021, the game was released on Nintendo Switch. It was ported to iOS and Android on 19 May 2022.

== Reception ==
Reception

Aggregate score
Aggregator	Score
Metacritic	82/100

Review scores
Publication	Score
Destructoid	8/10
Edge	9/10
Eurogamer	9/10
Kill Screen	68/100

Sokobond received "generally favorable" reviews from professional critics according to review aggregator website Metacritic.

Reviewers generally praised its chemistry theming as aiding in grasping the game's abstractions, without requiring the player to understand chemistry. They also praised Sokobond's minimalism, both in terms of visual design and level design. Eurogamer appreciated that the game added difficulty without increasing the number of elements in a level. Killscreen commented that the game managed to reuse its few elements in many intriguing ways. Destructoid found that the simplicity of the art and sound direction elegantly mirrored the simplicity of the gameplay.

The game was favorably compared to its inspiration Sokoban. Eurogamer opined that the theming of levels around mechanics and nonlinear level progression made it better. Rock Paper Shotgun contrasted it with the frustrating nature of Sokoban levels. Hardcore Gaming 101 compared Sokobond to other indie puzzlers, finding that although the game didn't do much differently in terms of general design, its usage of player freedom through its grid-based movement introduced a new component of the game's difficulty.

The game was showcased as a finalist in the 2013 IndieCade festival, and received an honorable mention in the 2014 Independent Games Festival in the category "Excellence in Audio".

== Legacy ==
Sokobond Express
- Publishers: Draknek & Friends
- Designers: José Hernández; Draknek & Friends
- Platforms: Linux; OS X; Windows
- Release: 22 February 2024
- Genre: Puzzle
- Mode: Single-player

Sokobond Express, a mashup of Sokobond and Alan Hazelden's Cosmic Express, was developed by Venezuelan developer José Hernández. Unlike Sokobond, the play area is not bound by the boundaries, and unlike Cosmic Express, orientation does not matter. An expansion of a previously idea by Hernandez, Subatomic Wire, previously published on itch.io in 2020, the idea was picked up for publishing as a game by Draknek. The game was announced on 27 July 2021, and released for Microsoft Windows, macOS, and Linux on 22 February 2024.

=== Reception ===
Reception

Aggregate score
Aggregator	Score
Metacritic	83/100

Review scores
Publication	Score
Edge	8/10
Nintendo World Report	7/10
Pocket Gamer	4/5
TouchArcade	4.5/5

Sokobond Express received "generally favorable" reviews from critics, according to the review aggregation website Metacritic. Edge praised the gameplay, audio, and sound design of the game, considering the game to be a "precise and expertly measured combination" of the other two games.
