= Pixel Defenders Puzzle =

2012 mobile video game

- Developer: Social Titans
- Platforms: iOS, Android
- Release: iOS; December 15, 2012; Android; July 25, 2013
- Genre: Puzzle

Pixel Defenders Puzzle is a tile-matching video game developed by American studio Social Titans for iOS and Android.

== Gameplay ==
The game follows standard match-3 mechanics, where the player places three identical units next to each other to upgrade them. Units with defined roles such as barbarians, wizards and rangers can be created depending on the matched pixel colors. Each turn taken earns action points, which can be spent to attack the enemy, which aims to kill your "VIP", a piece that moves around the board and cannot attack. As of 2012, the game had 36 levels.

== Reception ==
Reception

Aggregate score
Aggregator	Score
Metacritic	84/100

Review scores
Publication	Score
Eurogamer	8/10
Pocket Gamer	3.5/5
TouchArcade	4.5/5
Digital Spy	4/5

The iOS version received "favorable" reviews according to the review aggregation website Metacritic.

SlideToPlay wrote, "Pixel Defenders Puzzle has lots of charm and challenge, and that's exactly what we look for in a great puzzle game. Although the main gameplay is somewhat similar to another title, Triple Town, the combat elements make Pixel Defenders Puzzle feel fresh and exciting." TouchArcade wrote, "There's always been something satisfying about match-3 mechanics, but after enough years playing them over and over they're bound to start feeling stale. Pixel Defenders Puzzle steps beyond that by taking something from a game that was already an excellent evolution of the genre and moving it forward to another, even-more satisfying level." The Times described it as a "clever and great-value game".
