= Spooky Express =

2025 video game

- Developers: Draknek & Friends
- Publishers: Draknek & Friends
- Engine: Godot
- Platforms: Android; iOS; macOS; Windows
- Release: 21 October 2025
- Genre: Puzzle
- Mode: Single-player

Spooky Express is a 2025 puzzle video game developed and published by Draknek & Friends. Players complete a series of levels by routing train tracks through a grid to pick up and drop off a series of passengers. The game was released in October 2025 for Windows, macOS, iOS, and Android. Reviewers praised the gameplay and theming of Spooky Express.

== Gameplay ==
Spooky Express is a puzzle game. In each level, the player drags a train track across a 2D grid, and must pick up and drop off various passengers before reaching a connecting track on the opposite side of the grid. As the player's train only holds a limited number of passengers, managing what order passengers are picked up and dropped off is an important part of the game. Different types of passengers function differently: for example, vampires need to be delivered to a coffin, humans need to be taken to the end of the track, and demons cannot be next to vampires.

There are over 200 levels, and levels are grouped into worlds. Each world has a linear path of basic levels, as well as a branching set of advanced levels.

== Development and release ==
Spooky Express was developed and published by Draknek & Friends, a studio run by London-based developer Alan Hazelden. It was first announced in May 2025, and was released on 21 October 2025 for Windows, macOS, iOS, and Android. The game is built on the Godot game engine.

Lucas Le Slo was the level designer and created most of the game's puzzles. Creative director Alan Hazelden described their process as focusing each puzzle on exploring a single idea and using puzzles to teach key concepts, saying they used videos of playtesters to understand what concepts they missed to "figure out if there should be an earlier level focusing on that concept".

== Reception ==
Giovanni Colantonio of Polygon praised the gameplay, describing the interactions as clever and the puzzles as appealing to a wide range of difficulty. PC Gamer's Jonathan Bolding similarly remarked that the game was thoughtfully designed, offering simple puzzles and transitioning into "excellent brain-burning problems".

Colantonio praised the visual style for being a Halloween-themed game that avoided gory tropes. Writing for Pocket Gamer, Jupiter Hadley described the game as "perfect for Halloween", and praised the music and visual style. Heather Wald of GamesRadar compared the puzzles to building an amusement park ride.

The AV Club reviewed the mobile version positively, saying "I’ve found a mobile game so good that not changing my language and habits around mobile games would feel wrong".
