= A Play of Bodies =

2018 book by Brendan Keogh

A Play of Bodies: How We Perceive Videogames
- Author: Brendan Keogh
- Language: English
- Publisher: The MIT Press
- Publication date: 2018
- Pages: 248
- ISBN: 978-0262037631

A Play of Bodies: How We Perceive Videogames is a book by Brendan Keogh, published by MIT Press in 2018.
