= English Country Tune =

2011 video game

- Developer: Increpare Games
- Publisher: Increpare Games
- Designer: Stephen Lavelle
- Engine: Unity
- Platforms: iOS; Linux; Mac OS X; Microsoft Windows
- Release: 25 November 2011; Linux; 3 June 2013
- Genre: Puzzle
- Mode: Single-player

English Country Tune is a 2011 puzzle video game developed and published by Increpare Games, the studio of designer Stephen Lavelle.

== Gameplay ==
The first few levels are much like Sokoban puzzles, in which objects are pushed around on a grid by a player-controlled figure until they reach specified target cells; subsequent levels add other elements with different unconventional behaviors and goals. The levels often involve three-dimensional structures, around which the player must navigate using logic and abstraction.

== Development ==
Lavelle developed the prototype, which was in part inspired by Spacechem, at a game jam event. While finishing the game up, however the game, in Lavelle's own words, "ended up getting a lot bigger and changing a hell of a lot." Lavelle has also cited Cogs as an inspiration.

== Reception ==
Upon release, English Country Tune received mostly positive reviews, with its iOS version holding a score of 78/100 based on four critic reviews.
