= Poly Bridge 3 =

2023 puzzle video game by Dry Cactus

- Game header
- Developer: Dry Cactus
- Publisher: Dry Cactus
- Composer: Adrian Talens
- Series: Poly Bridge
- Engine: Unity
- Platforms: Linux; macOS; Microsoft Windows; Nintendo Switch
- Release: WW: 30 May 2023
- Genres: Simulation, puzzle
- Mode: Single-player

Poly Bridge 3 is a simulation-puzzle game developed and published by Dry Cactus. It is the third installment in the Poly Bridge series, and the sequel to Poly Bridge 2. The game was released for Linux, macOS and Microsoft Windows on 30 May 2023.

== Gameplay ==
Poly Bridge 3 features a new campaign which consists of over 100 levels. The game also introduces another new material, foundation, which is expensive but effective at reducing stress. A sandbox mode has also been added, allowing players to build bridges without the limitation of budget and resources. Unlike previous games in the series, the "worlds" are not locked into being accessed in a linear order, instead you unlock worlds in a larger map that provides players with more options and allowing worlds to have specific focuses, including jumps, hydraulics, pre-built environments―where some bridge components are already built for you and locked in place, and generic environments akin to the previous games.

The game has weekly challenges and supports modding.

== Development and release ==
The game was revealed on 16 March 2023 by the creator of the series, New Zealand-based video game developer Dry Cactus, who returned to develop and publish the game. The game was launched on 30 May 2023 for Linux, macOS and Microsoft Windows platforms.
