= Spirits (video game) =

2010 video game

- Developer(s): Spaces of Play
- Publisher(s): Spaces of Play
- Platform(s): iOS, Microsoft Windows, OS X, Android, Linux
- Release: November 11, 2010: iPad November 11, 2010 iPhone December 8, 2010 Windows February 15, 2012 OS X August 17, 2012 Android September 4, 2012 Linux November 6, 2012
- Genre(s): Puzzle, strategy
- Mode(s): Single-player

Spirits is a puzzle video game developed and published by Spaces of Play for iOS in 2010, and for Microsoft Windows, OS X, Android, and Linux in 2012. The game has a nature similar to Lemmings in that the player has to guide the spirits of fallen leaves by changing how the wind blows or rebuilding ground as autumn is quickly approaching.

== Reception ==
Reception

Aggregate score
Aggregator	Score
Metacritic	(iPhone) 80/100 (iPad) 79/100 (PC) 50/100

Review scores
Publication	Score
Eurogamer	(iPad) 8/10
GamePro	(iPad)
Jeuxvideo.com	18/20 (PC, Mac) 16/20
Pocket Gamer	(iPhone)

The iPhone and iPad versions received "generally favorable reviews", while the PC version received "mixed" reviews, according to the review aggregation website Metacritic.
