= Increpare =

Video game developer

- Born: Stephen Lavelle
- Occupation: Indie game developer
- Notable work: English Country Tune; Slave of God; Stephen's Sausage Roll
- Website: increpare.com

Stephen Lavelle, better known by the pseudonym Increpare, the Latin word for "rebuke", is a video game developer based in Berlin. Lavelle has released over 506 games since 2004, mostly small freeware games and often at the rate of several projects per month. With 178 games released between 2008 and 2014, Lavelle was named the "most prolific independent game developer" in the 2016 iteration of the Guinness World Records Gamer's Edition. Notable commercial releases include English Country Tune (2011) and Stephen's Sausage Roll (2016). In October 2013, Lavelle released PuzzleScript, an open-source scripting language for puzzle video games made in HTML5.

== Selected works ==
- MathCIV (2004, first freeware title listed)
- Opera Omnia (2009, freeware)
- English Country Tune (2011, commercial)
- Slave of God (2012, freeware)
- Cooking, for Lovers (2014, freeware)
- Subway Adventure (2015, freeware)
- Stephen's Sausage Roll (2016, commercial)
- Quiet City (included in the August 2017 Humble Monthly as a "Humble Original")
- Hypnocult (2019, commercial)
- Oeuf (2026, commercial)
