= Poly Bridge (video game) =

2016 puzzle video game by Dry Cactus

- Developer: Dry Cactus
- Publisher: Dry Cactus
- Composer: Adrian Talens
- Series: Poly Bridge
- Engine: Unity
- Platforms: Linux; OS X; Windows; iOS; Nintendo Switch; Android
- Release: July 12, 2016: Linux, OS X, Windows; July 12, 2016; iOS; June 13, 2017; Nintendo Switch; December 14, 2017; Android; March 15, 2018
- Genres: Simulation, puzzle
- Mode: Single-player

Poly Bridge is a bridge-building simulation-puzzle game, developed by New Zealand–based indie studio Dry Cactus with music by Canadian composer Adrian Talens, where players build bridges for vehicles to cross. Poly Bridge was released for Microsoft Windows on July 12, 2016, iOS on June 13, 2017. Steel, wood, rope, and cable can be combined and used to strengthen a designed bridge and "hydraulics" are used to move pieces of the bridge. The game is made more difficult with the availability of different building materials of different prices. A sequel to the game titled Poly Bridge 2 was released on May 28, 2020 for Windows, macOS, and Linux.

== Gameplay ==
The objective of the game is to build bridges to allow vehicles to cross them. That is done via 2D bridge model by creating a blueprint, and working with the materials which are given at use. Poly Bridge has a campaign mode with a series of scenarios that require different things to accomplish and introduce certain geographic features. In each level (more than 100 overall), there are two requirements: the building cost must come in under budget and the bridge has to be strong enough for a specific number of cars. There is also a sandbox mode that allows free building without restrictions, where the parameters can be set for creation. There is a variety of vehicles, ranging from motorcycles (fast and light) to dump trucks and cranes (slow and heavy). Since every vehicle has a different body and weight, that means longer cars may not be able to drive up steep slopes and the structure might need to adapt to the situation. The game also features obstacles such as jumps and boats, forcing the player to design their bridge creatively. A badly built bridge will collapse under the weight of a crossing vehicle. The game includes a GIF generator, allowing players to capture certain moments while playing and share them online.

== Reception ==
Reception

Aggregate score
Aggregator	Score
Metacritic	73/100

Review scores
Publication	Score
Game Informer	6.5/10
Nintendo Life	8/10
Nintendo World Report	5/10

Poly Bridge received mixed to positive reviews from critics. On Metacritic, the game holds a score of 73/100 for the Windows version based on 7 reviews.
