= Poly Bridge 2 =

2020 puzzle video game by Dry Cactus

- Game header
- Developer: Dry Cactus
- Publisher: Dry Cactus
- Composer: Adrian Talens
- Series: Poly Bridge
- Engine: Unity
- Platforms: Linux; macOS; Windows; iOS; Android
- Release: Linux, macOS, Windows; 28 May 2020 iOS; 28 October 2020; Android; 30 October 2020
- Genres: Simulation, puzzle
- Mode: Single-player

Poly Bridge 2 is a simulation-puzzle game developed and published by Dry Cactus, with music composed by Adrian Talens. It is the sequel to the critically acclaimed Poly Bridge. It is available worldwide for Linux, macOS, Microsoft Windows, Android, and iOS.

== Gameplay ==
A screenshot from the game.

The objective of Poly Bridge 2 is to build a bridge that can take vehicles from place A to place B with materials provided within a limited budget. In addition to the materials that were already featured in Poly Bridge, a new material, the spring, is introduced. The game offers eight different worlds which consist of 16 levels each, along with six "challenge worlds" consisting of harder versions of the levels contained in the first six worlds, adding up to a total of 224 levels. The addition of a feature similar to the Steam Workshop allows players to make and upload their own levels for other players to enjoy. This workshop service is hosted on Dry Cactus's servers, making the game compatible with other launchers such as the Epic Games Store, whereas Poly Bridge's workshop was hosted on the Steam Workshop and was thus restricted to the Steam launcher.

== Development and release ==
Poly Bridge 2 is developed and published by New Zealand-based video game developer Dry Cactus, with Canadian composer Adrian Talens returning to compose the original soundtrack. The game was released on Epic Games Store and Steam on 28 May 2020 for Linux, macOS and Microsoft Windows. It released with four regular worlds and four challenge worlds, with two additional normal worlds and one challenge world added on 2 August 2020. A mobile version of Poly Bridge 2 was released for iOS on 28 October 2020, and for Android on 30 October.

A sequel, titled Poly Bridge 3 was released on 30 May 2023.

== Soundtrack ==
All music is composed by Adrian Talens.

Poly Bridge 2 (Original Soundtrack)
No.	Title	Length
1.	"Reconstruction"	2:52
2.	"Safe Travels"	3:01
3.	"All That Should Hold"	2:47
4.	"Ahead of the Curve"	3:20
5.	"Hometown Hills"	3:48
6.	"Taking Flight"	4:46
7.	"Almost Was Good Enough"	2:46
8.	"Destinations"	2:41
9.	"Passports and Postcards"	4:36
10.	"Across the Map"	2:47
11.	"Woodland Drive"	2:33
12.	"Royal Sunrise"	3:52
13.	"Rocky Roads"	2:34
14.	"Going Places (Poly Bridge 2 Version)"	2:22
15.	"Under Construction (Poly Bridge 2 Version)"	3:11
16.	"Field Trip (Poly Bridge 2 Version)"	3:35
17.	"On The Road (Poly Bridge 2 Version)"	3:08
18.	"Are We There Yet? (Poly Bridge 2 Version)"	2:37
19.	"Along For The Ride (Poly Bridge 2 Version)"	2:43
20.	"Countryside Song (Poly Bridge 2 Version)"	4:06
21.	"Campfire Dreams (Poly Bridge 2 Version)"	3:06
22.	"Fall Into Place (Poly Bridge 2 Version)"	2:58
23.	"Fingers Crossed (Poly Bridge 2 Version)"	2:43
24.	"Rest Area (Poly Bridge 2 Version)"	4:56
25.	"Cruise Control (Poly Bridge 2 Version)"	2:58
26.	"Other Side of the Bridge (Poly Bridge 2 Version)"	2:20
27.	"Highway Driving (Poly Bridge 2 Version)"	2:53
28.	"Scenic Route (Poly Bridge 2 Version)"	2:48
29.	"River Crossing (Poly Bridge 2 Version)"	3:13
30.	"Pack Your Bags (Poly Bridge 2 Version)"	3:42
31.	"Station Wagon Sunset (Poly Bridge 2 Version)"	3:09
32.	"From Here to Somewhere (Poly Bridge 2 Version)"	2:58
Total length:		1:40:49

== Reception ==
Reception

Aggregate scores
Aggregator	Score
Metacritic	69/100
OpenCritic	57% recommend

Review score
Publication	Score
Shacknews	5/10

Poly Bridge 2 received "mixed or average" reviews, according to review aggregator Metacritic. Fellow review aggregator OpenCritic assessed that the game received fair approval, being recommended by 57% of critics.

Chris O'Connor of Impulse Gamer gave the game an overall 3.6 stars out of 5. He praised the game for being good fun at a pretty reasonable price, but criticised it for not having enough stages.

Michael Lafferty of Common Sense Media gave the game 4 stars out of 5.

John Walker of Rock, Paper, Shotgun commented the game is "far more like an expansion pack than a whole new game", and thought it difficult to enjoy if creating on one's own.
