= Flow Free =

2012 video game

- Developers: Big Duck Games LLC; Noodlecake Studios (Android)
- Publisher: Big Duck Games LLC
- Series: Flow Free
- Platforms: Windows Phone; iOS; Android
- Release: June 7, 2012
- Genre: Puzzle
- Mode: Single Player

Flow Free is a puzzle game developed and published by American studio Big Duck Games for iOS and Android in June 2012. As of 2022, the original game has received more than 100 million downloads, with its various variants receiving additional millions more.

== Gameplay ==
In this screenshot, the flow between the yellow dots needs to be completed to fill the grid.

Flow Free presents numberlink puzzles. Each puzzle has a grid of squares with pairs of colored dots occupying some of the squares. The objective is to connect dots of the same color by drawing 'pipes' between them so that the entire grid is occupied by pipes. However, pipes may not intersect. Difficulty is primarily determined by the size of the grid, ranging from 5x5 squares (3 colors) to 15x15 squares (up to 16 colors). Many grids are "open" and some contain "walls" which must be navigated around. Whenever a level is completed, a check mark will appear on the level select icon to indicate that the puzzle is solved, while a star indicates a "perfect" game, where the player finished the puzzle with the fewest moves required. The app also contains additional paid packs as well as a time trial mode.

== Expansions ==
Big Duck Games has also released several expansions in the series. The first expansion, Flow Free: Bridges, was released on November 8, 2012, at a fixed price. In this expansion, pipes can be made to intersect through pre-made bridges. The second expansion, Flow Free: Hexes, was released on October 12, 2016, and features both free and paid premium puzzles. The gameplay is similar to Flow Free except the grid is made of hexagons instead of squares. The third expansion, Flow Free: Warps, was released on August 8, 2017. This expansion allows pipes to warp from an edge of the map to another edge of the map. The fourth expansion, Flow Free: Shapes, was released on December 18, 2024. This expansion features many levels with multiple cell shapes and round edges.

== NP-completeness ==
According to a 2015 paper, Flow Free is NP-complete, meaning today's computers cannot solve the puzzles in polynomial time as complexity increases.
