= No One Has to Die =

2013 video game

no-one has to die.
- Cover image from the soundtrack of the game
- Developer: Sammy Madafiglio
- Artist: Cindy Xu
- Composer: Jesse Valentine
- Engine: Construct
- Platform: HTML5
- Release: Sat, 20 Apr 2013 22:51 +0000
- Genre: Puzzle
- Mode: Single-player

No One Has to Die (stylized no-one has to die.) is a 2013 video game by independent developer Sammy Madafiglio. The game is a narrative-driven puzzle game that explores science fiction elements including time travel, in which the player must make choices to rescue and sacrifice characters trapped in a fire at the headquarters of a mysterious corporation. Critics praised the game for its unorthodox use of the time loop theme in gameplay mechanics and its narrative and characterization.

== Plot ==
The player (the 'Visitor') is making a delivery to the control room of the Fenix Corporation Headquarters when a fire breaks out, triggering the security system and an evacuation. Four characters still in the building log on to the communications network. The player uses the control room proceeds through a series of levels in which they are required to make decisions about which characters are saved and which are claimed by the fire, with each path ultimately leading to one survivor:

- Christina is an employee of the Fenix Corporation who raises suspicion about the mysterious activities of the business. If the player chooses to save Christina, she reveals she lit the fire and killed the guards, stating that she sought to stop the activities of the Fenix Corporation, explaining that the corporation killed her mother after she disappeared from an "experiment", returning her mother's body after experimenting on her brain.
- Lionel is the CEO of the Fenix Corporation. If the player chooses to save Lionel, he explains that the business is a front for experiments in time travel and that the Corporation have developed a fully functioning time machine. He notes that the machine does not manipulate time, but transports a person's consciousness through time. A test subject attempted to travel back through time, but disappeared.
- Steve is an employee of the Fenix Corporation who is close to Christina and asks the player to save her instead. If the player chooses to save Steve, he is distraught that the player sacrificed Christina, but upon escape discovers a file about the "Phoenix Experiment" that proves the existence of a time loop and proves that Christina is still alive.
- Troy initially claims he killed the security staff in the building and lit the fire. If the player chooses to save him, Troy reveals he is an employee and did not light the fire, as he is in a time loop and has already witnessed the player make decisions about who to save. He entered a room named TEMPEST, which sent him back to the start of the fire.

Once all available endings have been played, a new path appears in which all characters return to the initial loop with knowledge of the events that occurred in their own timeline. The characters each provide the player with the codes they found in their respective endings, granting full access and the ability to lock all doors at once and "no-one has to die." Lionel reveals that Christina's mother is not dead, and when she was sent back in time, she did not return to her body, instead lost in time and searching for a host consciousness across other timelines. Extrapolating from this observation, Lionel concludes that TEMPEST has united each character from separate timelines. Surviving the fires on each level, the characters meet, with the exception of Christina, who reveals she has been to this timeline before, and makes the decision to instead re-enter TEMPEST to travel far back in time to continue her attempts to save her mother.

== Gameplay ==
A screenshot of gameplay in no-one has to die.

Players complete a series of levels in a branching path that represent the effects of choices made in the game. In each level, there is a grid floor plan of people, locations, and switches that can be interacted with. The objective of each level is to save one character by preventing fire from spreading to their location, with fire travelling one square in the grid per move. In order to do so, players take turns move characters, flip switches starting and stopping the flow of water, and remotely lock a limited number of doors in each level. If characters are in the same grid as fire or water, they will die. Levels are completed when the flow of fire and water has stopped. Depending on the choices made by the player to save certain characters, new levels will be revealed across playthroughs, requiring the player to complete the game multiple times to receive new endings that convey more information about the story. A menu allows the player to return to different branches in the story to minimise repetition.

== Reception ==
no-one has to die. was praised by several critics for its narrative, moral dilemmas and science fiction themes. Jay Is Games praised the game for its "characterization, moral dilemma, and branching paths presenting parts of a larger, complex story," favorably comparing the game to the visual novel Nine Hours, Nine Persons, Nine Doors. Ben Lee of Digital Spy praised the narrative as a "standout aspect" of the game, stating "there's plenty of mystery as you eventually discover the arsonist's motives and what insidious work the company actually does, and each ending boasts some great character revelations that will encourage you to continue playing and see everything." Writing for Rock Paper Shotgun, Porpentine Charity Heartscape observed that the game is "really about conveying narrative" and the game subverts the "erroneous assumption that once puzzle mechanics are introduced, they have to be challenging, optimized (and)geared toward victory." Tom Sykes of PC Gamer described the game's story as "excellent" and featured a "compelling mystery", stating the game "takes the visual novel and the turn-based puzzle game and fuses them into something brilliantly tense." Steve Brown of Adventure Gamers praised the game's "surreal but compelling science fiction story, highlighting the characterization in the game, stating "where the game really comes to life is between chapters, when the remaining characters communicate with you through the network’s chat system. The dialogue is very well written, with each pattern of deaths providing you with a bit more of the story."

Several critics analyzed the game's representation of death. Writing for PopMatters, G. Christopher Williams praised the game's exploration of death as a central theme, noting the "moral quandaries" in the game's puzzles that subvert the normal relationship of video games to death, where failure is averted with save points, continues and respawns. He notes the game explores this contradiction that whilst "(the) chart gives the illusion of a multilinear story and interactive experience, the game resolves in a single linear set of puzzles in which all of the characters can (and must be saved) in order to finish the game and the story. “Our paths” become a single story that Madafiglio wants to tell." In an analysis of time loops in video games, Line Hollis for Arcade Review stated the game was notable for its exploration of suicide and existential despair in the time loop, narrative, comparing Troy's representation in the game to the film Groundhog Day, praising its themes as "upsetting" and "taking the emotional reality of the story seriously." Porpentine Charity Heartscape of Rock Paper Shotgun praised the "spatialized despair" of how death was conveyed through the game's presentation, finding the representation "more meaningful than if you clicked a link saying the same thing."
