= Money Puzzle Exchanger =

1997 video game

- Developer: Face (Note: Ported to PlayStation by Santos with additional work by C-lab)
- Publisher: Face: Athena (Game Boy/PlayStation) GMF (Windows)
- Producer: Kengo Asai
- Designer: Starman
- Programmer: Piggy
- Artists: Atsuko Ishida; Mariko Sumiyoshi; Mutsuo Kaneko
- Composers: Kennosuke Suemura; Norihiko Togashi
- Platforms: Arcade, Game Boy, Windows, PlayStation
- Release: Arcade: JP: January 17, 1997; Game Boy: JP: August 29, 1997; Windows: JP: March 20, 1998; PlayStation: JP: November 5, 1998
- Genre: Puzzle
- Modes: Single-player, multiplayer
- Arcade system: Neo Geo MVS

Money Puzzle Exchanger (Note: Also known as Money Idol Exchanger (Japanese: マネーアイドルエクスチェンジャー, Hepburn: Manē Aidoru Ekusuchenjā) in Japan) is a 1997 tile-matching puzzle video game developed and published by Face for the Neo Geo arcade platform. Athena ported it to the Game Boy on August 29, 1997, and the PlayStation on November 5, 1998. Hamster Corporation re-released the game as part of their ACA Neo Geo series for the PlayStation 4, Xbox One, Nintendo Switch and Windows.

== Gameplay ==
Arcade version screenshot

Money Puzzle Exchanger has the same gameplay as Fujitsu's earlier PC game Moujiya, but structured as a stacking game similar to the Magical Drop, AstroPop, and Puzzle Bobble series, whereby players race to prevent a perpetually falling array of coins in different values from filling up the screen. Coins are combined (vertically and/or horizontally) to form higher valued coins; for example, five '1' coins will form a '5' coin, and two '5' coins will form a '10' coin, and so on, until two '500' coins are put together, at which point both disappear. Coins are arranged and colored to match denominations of the yen coins. Two bonus tiles allow for changes in gameplay. A green RU tile will rank up all coins of the same denomination; for example, all '10' coins will become '50' coins. A blue ER title will erase all coins of the same value. The game is won when any coin reaches the bottom of the opponent's screen.

In the single player mode, one of two characters can be selected who attempt to beat up to seven idiosyncratically named characters with names like Debtmiser, Mightdealer, Eldylabor, and Cherrybeiter. In the two player mode, both players fight each other until victory. The quicker and more efficiently each player clears out their screen, the quicker the other player's screen will fill up. Since filled screens offer the most opportunity for chaining together large combos, the tide can turn very quickly.

There is also another single player mode called Solo Mode. Any character can be played in this mode. The aim in Solo Mode is to continually clear the screen from coins and try to keep the game going for as long as possible.

=== Characters ===
- Sakura Mitsukoshi (三越 さくら Mitsukoshi Sakura) / Exchanger (エクスチェンジャー)
- Asahi Takashima (高島 あさひ Takashima Asahi) / Debtmiser (デットマイザー)
- Bill Bank (ビル=バンク Biru Banku) / Coquetrybouncer (コケティバウンサー)
- Lulula Franc (ルルーラ=フラン Rurūra Furan) / Cherrybeiter (チェリーバイター)
- Ena Arashizaki (嵐崎 円 Arashizaki Ena) / Everyworker (エヴリワーカー)
- Seshil Pound (セシル=ポンド Seshiru Pondo) / Eldylabor (エルディレイバー)
- Blibov Sakata (坂田 ビリィバーヴ Sakata Birībāvu) / Mackermocally (マッカーモーカリー)
- Note Bank (ノート=バンク Nōto Banku) / Mightdealer (マイトディーラー)

== Development ==
The game is one of the final and best known video game titles developed by Face before it filed and declared for bankruptcy in 2000, just a year before the bankruptcy of the original incarnation of SNK, the latter affiliated company. The development team of the game mostly consisted of former Technōs Japan employees. Kengo Asai, the producer for the game is also involved in development of another Neo Geo titles, such as Voltage Fighter Gowcaizer, Savage Reign, The Last Blade, The Last Blade 2, The King of Fighters '97, The King of Fighters '98, Real Bout Fatal Fury 2: The Newcomers, and Garou: Mark of the Wolves, as well as the cancelled Neo Geo titles, Dragon's Heaven (which tentatively was named DarkSeed) along with another SNK's video game titles, Samurai Shodown: Warriors Rage. The character designs for the game were done by then-wife of Masami Ōbari Atsuko Ishida (who also worked on Fatal Fury: The Motion Picture, Magic Knight Rayearth and The Brave Express Might Gaine).

A soundtrack for the game was released featuring the talents of voice actresses Sakura Tange, Yukana Nogami and Machiko Toyoshima. Sakura Tange and Yukana Nogami would later voice Sakura Kinomoto (which also have green eyes like Sakura Mitsukoshi) and Meiling Li respectively in the anime adaptation of Clamp's Cardcaptor Sakura.

The game has extensive use of Engrish. Examples of phrases used include "Let's fight to computer!" and "You put the same kind of items. That's OK." Most of the characters names are portmanteaus of English words involving money or love. The character names (in game stage order) are: Exchanger, Coquetry, Cherrybeiter, Everyworker, Debtmiser, Eldylabor, Macker, and Mightdealer.

== Reception ==
Reception

Review scores
| Publication | Score |
|---|---|
| AllGame | (Arcade) 3.5/5 |
| Famitsu | (GB) 22/40 (PS) 26/40 |
| Dengeki PlayStation | (PS) 70/100, 70/100 |
| MeriStation | (NG) 7.0/10 |
| Video Chums | (NS) 8.1/10 |

Money Puzzle Exchanger was met with positive reception from critics since its release. Famitsu gave both the Game Boy and PlayStation conversions a positive outlook. However, public response for the Game Boy version was mixed; In a poll taken by Family Computer Magazine, the game received a score of 19.4 out of 30, indicating a middling following. Video Chums regarded it as one of the most obscure puzzle games for PlayStation.

AllGame's Kyle Knight praised the overall audiovisual presentation and addictive gameplay but noted that its learning curve requires patience and practice. MeriStation's Rubén Martínez stated that Money Puzzle Exchanger was reminiscent of Puzzle Bobble and Magical Drop, noting its difficulty curve, praising the multiplayer mode, anime-style visuals, soundtrack and addictive gameplay but criticized the lack of power-up items. Video Chums's A.J. Maciejewski also gave the Nintendo Switch re-release positive remarks to the money-based gameplay, audiovisual presentation and competitive play but criticized the lack of variations in multiplayer and additional modes.
