= Faraway: Puzzle Escape =

2017 escape the room puzzle video game

- Developer: Pine Studio
- Publisher: Snapbreak Games
- Platforms: Android, iOS
- Release: EU: 15 May 2017
- Genre: Puzzle game
- Mode: Single-player

Faraway: Puzzle Escape is an escape the room puzzle video game developed by Pine Studio for iOS and Android platforms. The game is available as free-to-try and has been compared to the Myst video game series. The updated Director's Cut edition of Faraway was released on Steam for the PC in a first for the series on 4 March 2021.

== Overview ==
A total of six titles in the series were created so far between 2017 and 2019.

== Gameplay ==
The game is set in an explorable environment of the ancient civilization of Faraway, where the story of the player's father led her to. The player gets to explore 18 temples (levels) in the main game and 2 bonus levels, each of them containing a number of puzzles, which in turn give the player notes that carry the storyline of the adventure.

== Faraway 2: Jungle Escape ==
A sequel to Faraway: Puzzle Escape was released on 16 November 2017 under the title Faraway 2: Jungle Escape. It was reviewed positively by Multiplayer.it stating "Snapbreak Games delivers another good amount of puzzles in this Faraway 2: Jungle Escape. Compelling and never too hard, this is a good mobile interpretation of the explorative puzzle genre." and giving it 8 out of 10. It was named among 10 best free mobile games by BGR.com.
