= Photo Spot =

2009 video game

- Developer: Nexx Studio
- Platforms: iPhone, iPod Touch
- Release: February 2, 2009
- Genres: Spot the difference Puzzle; Arcade
- Mode: Single-player

Photo Spot is a spot the difference game for iPhone and iPod Touch. It was created by Malaysian developer Nexx Studio.

== Gameplay ==
The game require players to identify 4 differences on the set of images that are given in each level by tapping the areas on the screen that is incorrect. Player will have to beat the countdown timer and the constantly decreasing length of time in each subsequent level.

Any random attempts to locate the differences will only trigger an annoying buzzer and result in time penalty. However, there are 3 hints available in the game to assist you through some of the difficult level that you would encounter, but by keeping them unused would help you gain bonus score towards the end of each level.

== Future Releases ==
Nexx Studio has planned to include hundreds of additional high quality images and online highscore support in the near future to make the gameplay more competitive and interesting.
