= Alien Hive =

2013 video game

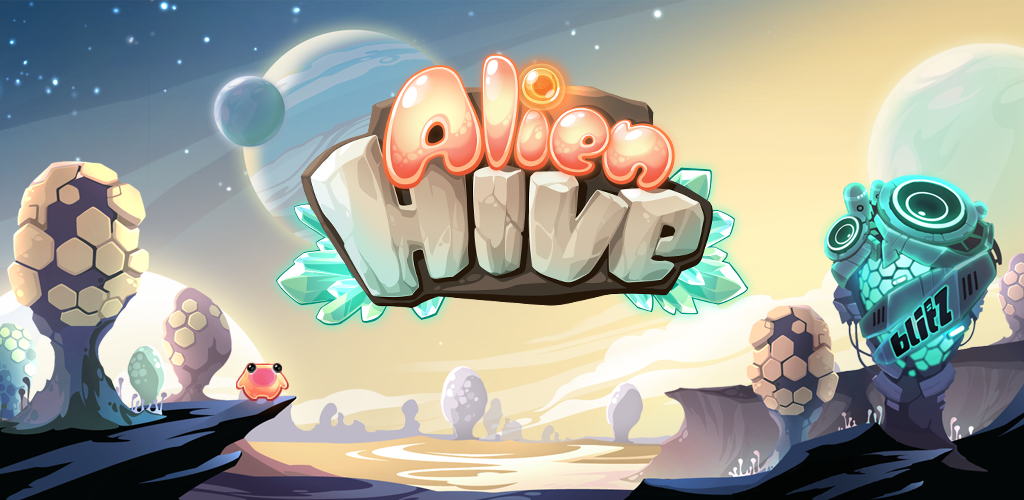
- Developer(s): Appxplore
- Publisher(s): Appxplore
- Platform(s): iOS, Android, Windows Phone
- Release: March 2013
- Genre(s): Puzzle

Alien Hive is an app based match-three blended with sliding puzzle video game released by Malaysia-based studio Appxplore in March 2013 on iOS, Android, Windows Phone.

== Gameplay ==
Swiping tiles to match the eggs and aliens so they can hatch, breed, and evolve into the Supreme Alien. The ultimate goal is to build up the ultimate alien hive by matching up the resource tiles. Avoid the Naughty Bots while crafting up power-ups to get rid of these trouble makers, at the same time, try to keep moves as few as possible. When they progress, players will face more aliens and uncover their mystery.

The key to evolving these Supreme Aliens is to use the Magic Fruit collected by merging the seeds into saplings. These Magic fruits are able to merge anything at a similar level using just 2 of a kind instead of 3. Each of the Supreme Aliens evolved can be activated using gold to provide special bonuses to future games.

=== In App Purchase ===
Alien Hive features microtransactions. Real-world money can be exchanged into in-game gold in order to buy useful consumable items. It was criticized in one of the critic reviews of the game, saying that micro-transactions were a necessity.

== Reception ==
Reception

Aggregate score
Aggregator	Score
Metacritic	70/100

According to the aggregator Metacritic, Alien Hive received average of 70 out of 100.

In 2015, Alien Hive achieved over 3-million accumulated downloads across all platforms.
