= Moujiya (video game) =

1995 video game

- Developers: Digital Pad (Windows): Racjin (arcade); BTD Studio (i-mode)
- Publishers: FPS (Windows, Mac): Etona/Media Shoji (arcade); Virgin Interactive Entertainment (PlayStation, Saturn); Hect (PlayStation (Honkakuha de ¥1,300 Series rerelease)); BTD Studio (i-mode)
- Director: Ozzy
- Producers: Izumi Sugawara; Sunao Ueda
- Programmers: Ozzy; Joe Mizuno
- Artists: Komugi; Jeronimo Isaka; Yasumi Agatsuma
- Composer: Satoru Wono
- Platform: Windows: arcade, PlayStation, Saturn, i-mode
- Release: December 1995: Windows; JP: December 1995; JP: 1997 Arcade; JP: April 1996 Sega Saturn; JP: 20 December 1996 PlayStation; JP: 10 January 1997 Honkakuha de ¥1,300; JP: 14 September 1999 Macintosh; JP: 1997
- Genre: Puzzle
- Modes: Single-player, multiplayer

Moujiya or Ryougae Puzzle Mouja (Note: Moujiya got released under a variety of slightly different spellings across its many ports and versions, sometimes used inconsistently within the same release, which become even more numerous when accounting for differing transliteration standards. Some of the names used are Mouja, Moudja, Moujiya, Moudjiya, Ryougae Puzzle Game Moujiya, Ryougae Puzzle Mouja and so forth (all variations of 両替パズルゲーム／両替パズル もうぢや／もうぢゃ).) is a falling blocks puzzle video game from Fujitsu Pasocom Systems, the consumer software division of Fujitsu. Initially developed for computers running Windows 3.11 and above, it later got made into an arcade video game, which itself was ported to popular home consoles of the time.

== Gameplay ==
Screenshot of the first PC release running on Windows 95

Moujiya’s gameplay is similar to Puyo Puyo, in that it is a falling blocks game where the units fall in pairs and must be grouped together with other units of the same type. Here, the units consist of yen coins that are exchanged for one of the next denomination when enough coins are grouped side by side. When two ¥500 coins are grouped together, they are exchanged for a ¥1,000 banknote and are removed from the board. This mechanic was later copied by Face and combined with Magical Drop’s gameplay to make Money Idol Exchanger, which saw much wider success, being released across the world, possibly due to the popularity of SNK's Neo Geo arcade platform at the time.

== Releases and spin-offs ==
The game was originally released in 1995 for Windows 3.1 and above. A second version was released in 1997 for Windows 95 which allowed for online play. This version was also released on Macintosh.

In 1996, Etona licensed Moujiya from Fujitsu and commissioned Racjin to make an arcade conversion. This game, made from the ground up, featured a completely new cast of characters and different garbage block mechanics from the original, among other lesser changes. Etona's version was then ported to the Sega Saturn and also to the PlayStation shortly thereafter, with the publishing being handled by Virgin Interactive Entertainment. In 1999, Hect would snatch up publishing rights for the PlayStation version and rerelease it under their Honkakuha de ¥1,300 Series budget label.

In the 2000s, mobile game company BTD Studio would license Mouja for release on Japanese cellular services. Its first game was Chou Ge Moujiya, a cut down version of the arcade game released only on i-mode. They would later make two spin-offs: Doubutsu de Moujiya, also only on i-mode, and Gals★Moujiya, part of their Gals Kiss series of burlesque games, released on i-mode, EZweb and S!Appli.
