= Cosmic Express =

2017 video game

- Designer: Alan Hazelden
- Programmer: Benjamin Davis
- Artist: Tyu
- Engine: Unity
- Platforms: Android, iOS, Linux, macOS, Windows, Nintendo Switch
- Release: 16 March 2017; Nintendo Switch; 2 September 2021
- Genre: Puzzle
- Mode: Single-player

Cosmic Express is a puzzle video game created by Alan Hazelden, Benjamin Davis and Tyu. The game was released in 2017 for personal computers, mobile devices, and Nintendo Switch.

== Gameplay ==
Cosmic Express is a puzzle video game that tasks players with constructing train tracks inside space domes to transports passengers to their destinations.

== Development and release ==
Cosmic Express was created by independent developers Alan Hazelden, Benjamin Davis and Tyu. The game developed using the Unity game engine. The game was released for Linux, macOS, and Windows-based personal computers and Android and iOS mobile devices on 16 March 2017. A port for Nintendo Switch was released on 2 September 2021.

Draknek & Friends released multiple successors to Cosmic Express, including Sokobond Express (2024) and Spooky Express (2025).

== See also ==
- Causality (video game)
