= A Good Snowman Is Hard to Build =

2015 video game

A Good Snowman Is Hard To Build
- Developers: Benjamin Davis; Alan Hazelden
- Publisher: Draknek
- Designers: Benjamin David; Alan Hazelden
- Composer: Priscilla Snow
- Engine: OpenFL
- Platforms: Linux, OS X, Windows, Android, iOS, Nintendo Switch
- Release: Linux, OS X, Windows; 25 February 2015; Android, iOS; 9 December 2015; Nintendo Switch; 2 September 2021
- Genre: Puzzle
- Mode: Single-player

A Good Snowman Is Hard to Build is a 2015 puzzle video game developed by Alan Hazelden and Benjamin Davis and published by Draknek. The game was released in 2015 for Linux, OS X, Windows, Android, and iOS.

== Gameplay ==
The player (black figure, referred to as a monster) and a snowman, missing the top snowball

A Good Snowman Is Hard to Build is a grid-based puzzle video game that tasks players with helping a featureless monster to build snowmen. Snowmen are built by stacking three snowballs of decreasing size. Rolling small or medium-sized balls over snowy ground increases their size. Building all snowmen in a room unlocks adjacent rooms which are all part of a hedge maze.

Players can undo one move at a time or reset a room.

== Development and release ==
A Good Snowman Is Hard to Build was created by UK-based independent developers Alan Hazelden and Benjamin Davis. Its prototype was developed using Puzzlescript, an open-source HTML5 puzzle game engine, in 2014. The commercial release was written in Haxe and OpenFL and released for Linux, OS X, and Windows-based personal computers on 25 February 2015. A version for Android and iOS mobile devices was released on 9 December 2015. A Nintendo Switch version released on 2 September 2021.

For the game's 10th anniversary in 2025, the Itch.io release of the game permanently moved to a 'Pay What The Temperature Is' pricing model, where the price would be $1 for every degree Celsius it is in London according to OpenWeatherMap's tracking, updated every hour. For example, if the temperature was 2.5 degrees Celsius, the price would become $2.50. If the temperature in London drops below freezing the game will become freeware.

== Reception ==
Reception

Aggregate score
| Aggregator | Score |
|---|---|
| Metacritic | 93/100 |

A Good Snowman Is Hard to Build received "universal acclaim" from professional critics, according to the review aggregator website Metacritic.

A Good Snowman Is Hard to Build won the award for "Best Character Design" at Intel Level Up 2014.
