= Stephen's Sausage Roll =

2016 video game

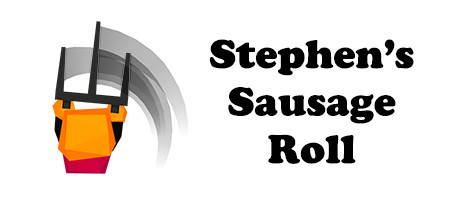
- Developer: Increpare Games
- Publisher: Increpare Games
- Designer: Stephen Lavelle
- Engine: Unity
- Platforms: Linux, Windows, OS X
- Release: April 18, 2016
- Genre: Puzzle
- Mode: Single-player

Stephen's Sausage Roll is a puzzle video game developed and published by Increpare Games, the studio of designer Stephen Lavelle. It was released in 2016 for Windows, OS X, and Linux. The player controls a character who pushes sausage links onto hot grill tiles to cook them. The game was received well by critics and was praised by other indie puzzle video game creators.

== Gameplay ==
Gameplay trailer for Stephen's Sausage Roll

Puzzles in Stephen's Sausage Roll involve moving around sausage links in a Sokoban-like grid format, with the goal being to move each sausage over special grill tiles in order to cook them once on each spot—two spots on each "side" of the sausage—and then return the player character to the starting position.

A puzzle can be failed either by burning a sausage, which happens when a single spot is cooked more than once; rolling a sausage off of the island and into the surrounding water; or making the player character themself fall into the water. The game includes an undo button to go back a single step, as well as a button to restart.

The player character is composed of two parts: the character itself, and their fork, each of which occupy their own tile. The player can rotate in place and move forwards and backwards, but may not strafe while holding the fork, which makes navigation of tight spaces difficult.

The game is split into multiple sections, each of which require all puzzles within to be completed before the player can move on to the next section. These sections introduce new puzzle mechanics as the game progresses, including the ability to skewer sausages onto the fork, roll on top of sausages, and the ability to separate the player character from their fork.

== Plot ==
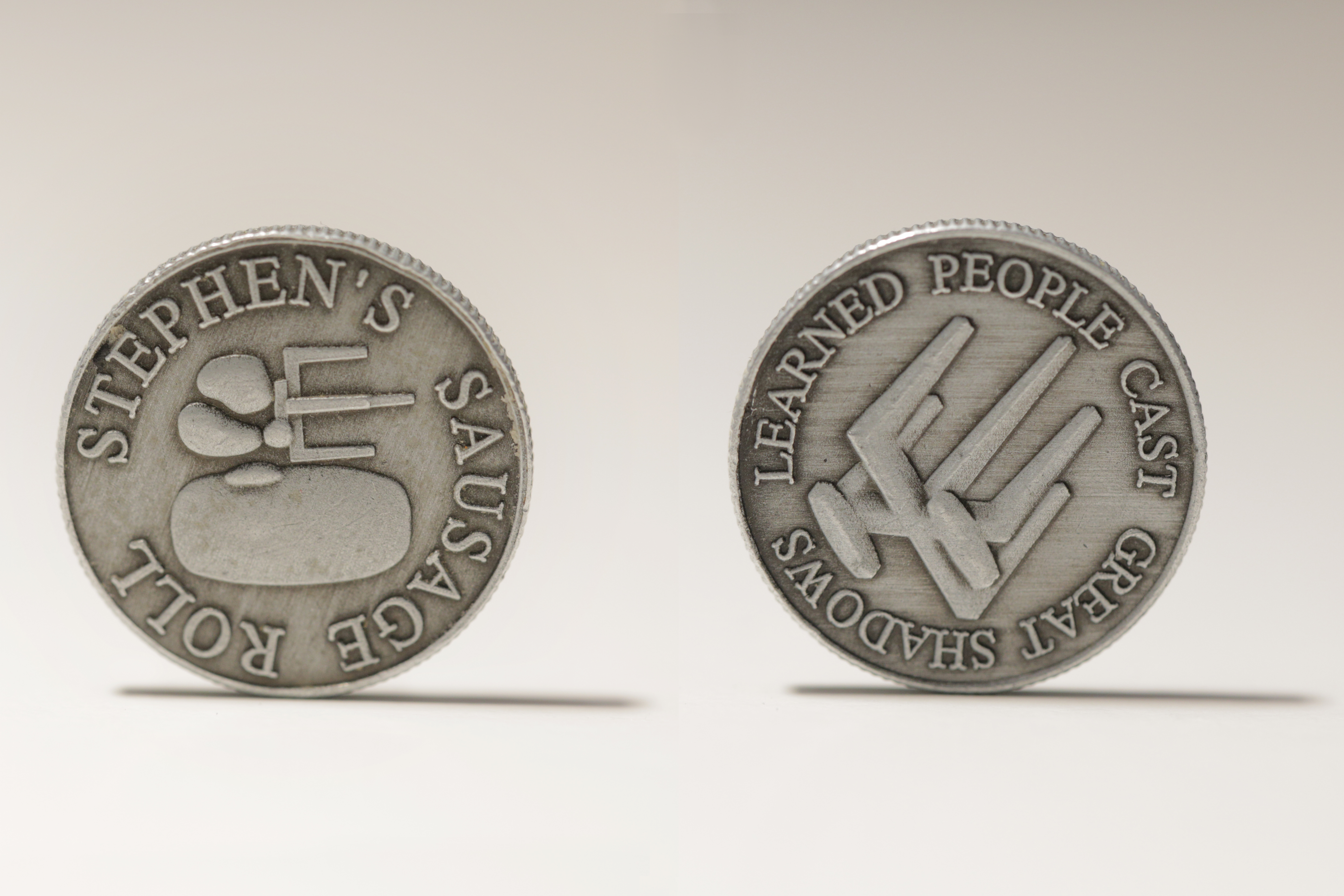
One of the coins that Stephen Lavelle sent to players of the game.

The story of Stephen's Sausage Roll is communicated through stone tablets found throughout the game's overworld. They contain short, seemingly unrelated phrases which gradually grow into a fuller story.

== Reception ==
Reception

Aggregate score
Aggregator	Score
Metacritic	90/100

Review scores
Publication	Score
Destructoid	10/10
Edge	9/10
Game Informer	8/10
Hardcore Gamer	4.5/5
The Guardian	5/5

Stephen's Sausage Roll holds an aggregated Metacritic score of 90/100, based on 9 critic reviews. Reviewers noted the game's difficulty, where Jordan Erica Webber from The Guardian said the game was more difficult than The Witness, which was already recognized for its difficulty. The Guardian described the game's designer, Stephen Lavelle, as prolific.

Prior to release fellow indie developers Bennett Foddy and Jonathan Blow both praised the game for its difficulty and originality, with Foddy comparing the game to Dark Souls. Jordan Erica Webber from The Guardian noted that the difficulty may frustrate some players.

== Accolades ==
Year	Award	Category	Result	Ref
2017	The Edge Awards 2016	PC Game of the Year	Won	
