= Otocky =

1987 video game

- Cover art featuring Natsuki Ozawa
- Developer(s): Scitron & Art; SEDIC
- Publisher(s): ASCII Corporation
- Designer(s): Toshio Iwai
- Platform(s): Family Computer Disk System
- Release: JP: March 27, 1987
- Genre(s): Music game
- Mode(s): Single-player

Otocky (オトッキー) is a musical video game developed by SEDIC and released by ASCII Corporation in 1987 for the Family Computer Disk System in Japan. The game was conceived and designed by Toshio Iwai. Natsuki Ozawa endorsed the game.

== Gameplay ==
Otocky can be described as a musical side-scrolling shoot 'em up. The player's spaceship has a ball for a weapon, which can be fired in eight directions; each direction corresponds to a different musical note. The note plays when the player presses the fire button, and is also quantized in time so that it matches the beat playing in the background. By using the weapon selectively the player can improvise music while playing.

The ball is used to destroy enemies by touching them, and also to catch various types of objects:

- Musical Notes which must be collected to finish the level.
- Letter 'A's which change the musical instrument sound produced by the ball.
- Letter 'B's which provide a secondary weapon.

The ball gets smaller when the player is touched by an enemy, until the player loses a life.

Completing a certain number of levels unlocks a music editor which makes it possible for the player to freely compose their own melodies.

== Legacy ==
Otocky is notable for being one of the first games that include creative/procedural generative music, as well as developing the concept of the "musical shoot 'em up".

Otocky is a precursor of Rez, Tetsuya Mizuguchi's 2002 Dreamcast and PlayStation 2 game exploring similar themes of player action and musical evolution. Jake Kazdal, the only North-American member of United Game Artists, has confirmed that while the team did become acquainted with the Disk System game during the process of creating Rez, it has not been much of an influence in fact.

== See also ==
- List of Family Computer Disk System games
- Sound Fantasy
- SimTunes
- Electroplankton
- Rez
