= Electroplankton =

2005 video game

- North American box art
- Developer: indieszero
- Publisher: Nintendo
- Director: Toshio Iwai
- Producers: Shigeru Miyamoto; Toru Osawa
- Designer: Toshio Iwai
- Artists: Nanako Kinoshita; Kazuma Norisada
- Composers: Koichi Kyuma; Yuichi Ozaki
- Platform: Nintendo DS
- Release: JP: April 7, 2005; NA: January 9, 2006; EU: July 7, 2006
- Genre: Music game
- Mode: Single-player

Electroplankton (Note: Japanese: エレクトロプランクトン, Hepburn: Erekutoropurankuton) is an interactive music video game developed by indieszero and published by Nintendo for the Nintendo DS handheld video game console. It was first released in Japan in 2005, and was later released in North America and Europe in 2006. This game allows the player to interact with animated plankton and create music through one of ten different plankton themed interfaces. The first edition of Electroplankton in Japan is bundled with a set of blue ear bud headphones.

== Gameplay ==
The game offers two game modes: Performance and Audience. Performance mode allows the user to interact with the plankton through use of the stylus, touchscreen, and microphone. Audience mode is like a demo mode, which simply allows the user to put down the system and enjoy a continuous musical show by all of the plankton, although the user can interact with the plankton just like in Performance mode. The game does not save data of any kind, which prevents players from saving any composed pieces. However, this can be circumvented by connecting an audio recording device, such as a cassette recorder or a personal computer, to the headphone jack of the Nintendo DS.

== Development ==
Nintendo president Satoru Iwata explained that the unusual reason why director Toshio Iwai's name appears directly on the game's packaging is because he alone had created it. The game is the second collaboration between Nintendo and Iwai, having done so with Sound Fantasy for the Super Nintendo Entertainment System, which was never released. The developers considered including a save function, but opted not to because they wanted the players to enjoy the game both viscerally and without preparation. They believed that if a save function had been included, then the game would have been used more as a tool, where the player must open several additional menus and windows or must input file names to save. Another reason was that it would require a large volume of flash ROM and would take a long time to save and read the data in order to save the voice files for Volvoice and Rec-Rec.

== Release ==
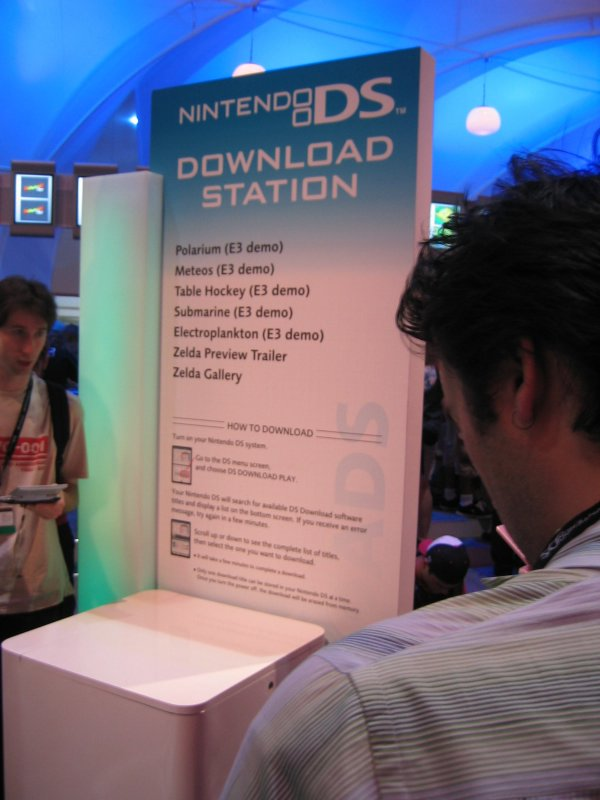
A demo of Electroplankton was available for download from Nintendo DS Download Stations at E3 2005.

The game made its first public appearance at the 2005 Game Developer's Conference, and later, an appearance at the E3 show. An exhibition was held in Laforet Museum in Harajuku between April 8th and April 14th to promote the game's Japanese launch. The game was released in North America on January 9, 2006; sales of the game were limited to online retailers and the Nintendo World store in New York City, though some other retailers chose to carry the game. For example, Electronics Boutique carried the game when it was released in Canada. It was released in Europe on July 7 the same year.

A release was planned by Nintendo Australia in late 2006 but never occurred due to, according to Nintendo Australia representatives, not enough space in the release schedule.

=== Release as DSiWare ===
Electroplankton was re-released in Japan, as part of the DSiWare service exclusive to the Nintendo DSi system in 2009. Each instrument was available to buy separately for 200 Nintendo Points each.

Tracy (renamed Trapy), Hanenbow, Nanocarp, and Beatnes were released on July 11, and Rec Rec and Lumiloop were released on July 22. Luminaria and Sun Animalcule were released August 5, and Marine Snow and Volvoice were released August 26.

In North America, all 10 Electroplankton characters were released in November 2009. Trapy, Hanenbow, Rec-Rec, Nanocarp, and Beatnes were released on November 9, and Luminaria (renamed Luminarrow), Sun-Animalcule, Lumiloop, Marine-Snow (renamed Marine-Crystals), and Volvoice (renamed Varvoice) were released November 23.

In the PAL region, the first two Electroplankton characters were released on January 15, 2010, which were Beatnes and Hanenbow. The next two were released on January 22, which were Nanocarp and Trapy. The next two released were Luminarrow and Sun-Animalcule on January 29. Rec Rec and Lumiloop were added on February 12, and the last two minigames Marine-Crystals and Varvoice were released on February 26.

== Reception ==
Joystiq gave it 8.0 out of 10. Nintendo Power gave it 8.5 out of 10. IGN gave it 7.0 out of 10. Official Nintendo Magazine gave it 78%.

Kidzworld said that one of the most common complaints concerning Electroplankton is that the game offers no true way to save the audio created by the player. The musician Stemage produced a track using the game in 2005, albeit with reliance on Adobe Audition for editing.

=== Legacy ===
Electroplankton is represented in Super Smash Bros. Brawl with its own stage called Hanenbow that is based on the Hanenbow feature. This stage also returned in Super Smash Bros. Ultimate. Several stickers and Spirits based on the game were in these two games.

== See also ==
- Otocky, a game for the Famicom Disk System by Electroplankton designer Toshio Iwai, which is notable for developing the concept of the musical shoot 'em up in 1987
- Sound Fantasy, an unreleased game for the Super NES/Super Famicom that was created by Electroplankton designer Toshio Iwai and developed by Nintendo
- SimTunes, a PC game, also designed by Iwai, that the unreleased Sound Fantasy was converted into
- Tenori-on, a digital musical instrument created by Electroplankton designer Toshio Iwai. Tenori-on's interface is similar to some of the Electroplankton modes.
- Daigasso! Band Brothers, a music game developed by Nintendo for the Nintendo DS
