= Toshio Iwai =

Japanese artist (born 1962)

- 岩井 俊雄
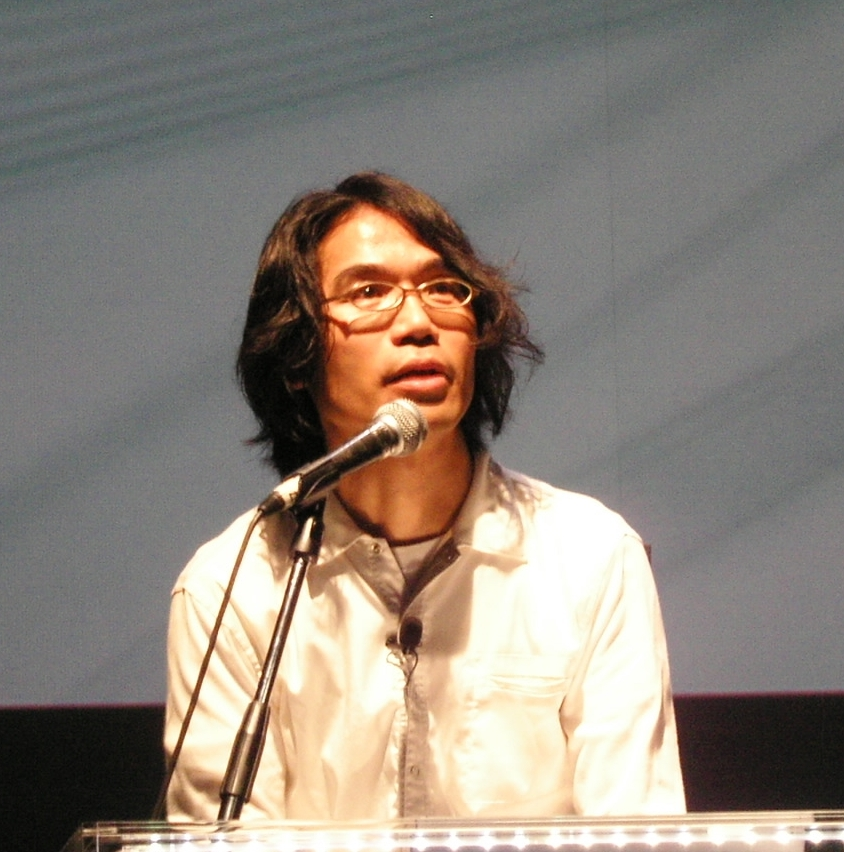
- Iwai in 2005
- Born: 1962 (age 63–64); Kira, Aichi, Japan
- Education: University of Tsukuba
- Occupation: Artist
- Years active: 1987–present
- Notable work: Otocky; Sound Fantasy; Electroplankton

Toshio Iwai (岩井 俊雄, Iwai Toshio; born 1962) is a Japanese interactive media and installation artist who has also created a number of commercial video games. In addition he has worked in television, music performance, museum design and digital musical instrument design.

== Education and early work ==
Iwai was born in 1962 in Kira, Aichi, Japan. As a child, he spent time creating flip book-style animations in the corner of text books and making motor-driven mechanical toys, since these were the only technologies available to him. In 1981 Iwai matriculated in the Fine Arts Department at the University of Tsukuba, studying Plastic Art and Mixed Media. Influenced by the work of Norman McLaren, he began producing installation art that combined pre-cinema animation techniques (the phenakistoscope and the zoetrope) with modern methods of image capture and creation (photocopiers, video cameras and computer graphics) and of stroboscopic lighting (video monitors, video projectors and LEDs). His 1985 installation Time Stratum won the Gold prize at the High Technology Art Exhibition '85, held in Shibuya Seibu, Tokyo. Time Stratum II was awarded the Grand Prize at the 17th Contemporary Japanese Art Exhibition, Meguro Art Museum, Tokyo. In 1987 Iwai graduated from the University of Tsukuba with a master's degree in Plastic Art and Mixed Media. In the same year, Iwai designed his first published videogame, Otocky, in association with ASCII Corporation.

In 1991-92 Iwai was an Artist-in-Residence at the Exploratorium in San Francisco, California, where he created two exhibits that are now part of the museum's permanent collection, Well of Lights (1992) and Music Insects (1992). Music Insects became the foundation for his unpublished video game Sound Fantasy.

This period of work culminated in Another Time, Another Space (1993), an interactive installation devised for Antwerp Centraal Station, Belgium. The installation used 15 video cameras to capture live images of visitors to the station; 30 computers manipulated the video feeds output to 30 video monitors in real-time, introducing visual effects such as time-lapse delays, slow-motion effects and time compression.

== Later installation work ==
From 1994 to 1995 Iwai was an Artist-in-Residence at the ZKM (Center for Art and Media) in Karlsruhe, Germany. Around this time his work became increasingly focused on the relationship between sound and image, using interactivity, gestural interface and generative, interactive and aleatoric music. These interests are expressed in three key installation works, Resonance of 4, Piano - As Image Media and Composition on the Table.

Resonance of 4 (1994) is a collaborative music-creation artwork consisting of four adjacent stations, each comprising a small podium bearing a computer mouse, a 16-by-16 grid projected onto the floor from a video projector above, and a cursor connected to the mouse. Dots can be placed in each of the grid's cells by clicking with the mouse. A synchronized bar sweeps across all the grids simultaneously, triggering musical notes wherever a dot has been placed. Sound is relayed over a loudspeaker system, and the notes from all four stations are superimposed, although each station has its own musical tone. This work was shown at the Serious Games exhibition at the Laing Art Gallery, Newcastle in 1996 and 1997 and at the Barbican Arts Centre, London in 1997.

In Piano - As Image Media (1995), audience members operate a trackball to draw lighted dots on a grid projected onto a sheet of fabric that leads to the keyboard of a small grand piano. The dots move towards the piano keyboard, and as they come close to it they accelerate and strike a key. The piano, controlled by a computer, plays the note corresponding to the 'struck' key, and at the same time, a computer-generated graphical figure appears on another sheet of fabric suspended above the piano, appearing to fly out of the piano and up into the air. This work, along with Composition on the Table, was shown in the Play Zone at the Millennium Dome in London, 1999–2000. It was also one of the works used in Iwai's performance collaboration with Ryuichi Sakamoto, Music Plays Images x Images Play Music.

Composition on the Table (1998/99) comprises four white tables bearing physical interface components: switches, dials, and turntables. Computer graphics images are projected onto the tables from ceiling-mounted video projectors, and loudspeakers are present. As the audience manipulates the interface elements, graphical and audio changes take place in a way that is intimately connected to the audience's input. The objective of this work was to create a mixed reality environment where multiple participants could create visuals and music together. Elements of this work are recognizable in Iwai's Nintendo DS videogame Electroplankton. The piece was presented as part of the Art Gallery at SIGGRAPH'99, Los Angeles.

From 1996 to 1998 Iwai was the first Artist in Residence at IAMAS in Ōgaki, Japan. In 1997 he had a major retrospective exhibition at the NTT InterCommunication Center in Tokyo. From 1998 to 2001 he was Artist in Residence at Mixed Reality Systems Laboratory in Yokohama, Japan.

== Video games ==
Iwai is the first internationally recognized gallery artist also to have led the creation of several successful commercial video game projects. This cross-disciplinary ability typifies Iwai's career.

Iwai's first game was the musical shoot 'em up Otocky (1987), produced in association with ASCII Corporation for the Famicom Disk System, an add-on for the NES available only in Japan. The game is notable for being the first to include creative/procedural generative music. Through association with different game mechanics and player actions, the game plays quantized-in-time musical notes in a variety of digitally synthesized voices. Otocky is a precursor of Rez, Tetsuya Mizuguchi's 2002 Dreamcast and PlayStation 2 game exploring similar themes of player action and musical evolution.

Later, leveraging work done on the 1993 installation art project Music Insects at San Francisco's Exploratorium, Iwai went to Nintendo, where he created another sound-based game for the Super Nintendo Entertainment System called Sound Fantasy. In the game animated insects traverse a grid containing colored dots. As the insects pass over the dots, musical scales, sounds, and graphical effects are triggered. The player can select colors from a palette and paint on the grid, triggering new results and changing the insects' direction, improvising a visual music performance. However, the game's release was cancelled and it was eventually converted into the PC title SimTunes, published by Maxis, a division of Electronic Arts.

In 2000, Iwai worked to publish Bikkuri Mouse (びっくりマウス), a collaborative drawing game that became the PlayStation 2's first mouse-compatible title. This was followed in 2001 by the limited-edition release of a simple step sequencer, Tenori-on (テノリオン), for the WonderSwan. This non-game would be the precursor to the more advanced 2005 version released together with Yamaha.

Iwai's acclaimed Electroplankton for the Nintendo DS was released in Japan in 2005 and in Europe and North America in 2006. A suite of ten different interactive music and audio toys themed around cartoon plankton and using the novel touchscreen and microphone interface features of the Nintendo DS, Electroplankton draws heavily on Iwai's earlier work, including Composition on the Table.

=== Games designed by Toshio Iwai ===
- Otocky (1987; Famicom Disk System)
- Sound Fantasy (canceled; Super Famicom)
- SimTunes (1996, PC)
- Bikkuri Mouse (びっくりマウス) (2000, PlayStation 2)
- Tenori-on (テノリオン) (2001, WonderSwan)
- Electroplankton (2005, Nintendo DS)

== Television ==
In 1990 Iwai's solo show Machine for Trinity exhibited at the Laforet Museum in Tokyo; some of the works shown there demonstrated that computer graphics could be generated and combined in real-time with live action images. The TV director Shinji Fukuhara visited the exhibition and shortly afterward contracted Iwai to create concepts and a virtual set for a weekly half-hour science news show Einstein TV (Fuji TV, 1990–91). Created on the Amiga, the virtual set included GUI-like pop-up menus.

This led to more work with Fuji TV the following year in the development of the daily interactive children's show Ugo Ugo Lhuga (1992–94). Influenced by Pee-wee's Playhouse, which Iwai had seen during his tenure at the Exploratorium in the United States, the show was imaginative and irreverent and featured talking TVs, a tomato that gave advice to call-in guests, a robot named Robot that asked riddles and broke down when given silly answers, anthropomorphic faeces named Professor Poo Poo, and a cubo-surrealist artist named Surr. Ugo Ugo Lhuga is 'go-go girls' anagrammed in Japanese.

A central concept of the show was that two live-action main characters would appear to interact with the sets and characters of a virtual world. Instead of generating the virtual characters first and orchestrating the actions of the live-action cast to fit pre-rendered imagery, the characters were generated and composited in real-time with minimal post-production. At first the shows were pre-recorded, but after the first six months cast and crew were confident enough to perform live.

To enhance the live-broadcast appeal of the show, Iwai helped devise a call-in sumo match. Children from across Japan sent in drawings of sumo wrestlers on postcards, which Iwai scanned. During the program the audience called in and, watching their televisions at home, shouted into the telephone; the louder they shouted the stronger their sumo wrestler became, finally pushing the opposing wrestler out of the dohyō.

== Performances and public lectures ==
In 1996 and 1997, Iwai collaborated with musician and composer Ryuichi Sakamoto to create the multimedia stage performance Music Plays Images x Images Play Music. The performance included use of Iwai's installation Piano - As Image Media and a version of Resonance of 4 adapted to use a chessboard-like interface.

In June 2004, Iwai gave a prestigious invited public lecture at the 4th International Conference on New Interfaces for Musical Expression, held in Hamamatsu, Japan.

== Museum design ==
Created during his time as an Artist-in-Residence at the Exploratorium in San Francisco, California, Iwai's works Well of Lights (1992) and Music Insects (1992) are part of the Exploratorium's permanent collection.

Iwai contributed to the construction of the Bouncing Totoro 3-dimensional zoetrope at the Ghibli Museum in Mitaka, Tokyo. He helped conceive an LED strobe device to be used in place of conventional strobe lights, softening the lighting as a result. He also made a layout plan for the positioning of the figures using a computer.

== Digital musical instrument design ==
A current project of Iwai's, in collaboration with Yamaha Corporation, is the creation of a new interactive digital musical instrument. Called Tenori-on, the instrument is a sixteen-by-sixteen array of illuminated LED switches which can be activated in a variety of ways to create a changing musical soundscape.

Tenori-on was showcased throughout its development through stage and conference performances. It went on sale in the United Kingdom on 4 September 2007.

== Notable works ==
Installations

- Time Stratum IV 1990
- Another Time, Another Space NHK version 1994
- Resonance of 4 1994
- Piano - As Image Media 1995
- Composition on the Table 1998/99
- Shanghai World Financial Center, Observation Deck 2008

Permanent Exhibits

- Well of Lights Exploratorium, 1992
- Music Insects Exploratorium, 1992
- Another Time, Another Space, National Museum of Photography, Film and Television (now the National Media Museum), Bradford, UK 1999

Videogames

- Otocky 1986
- SimTunes 1996
- Electroplankton 2005

Television

- Einstein TV 1990–91
- Ugo Ugo Lhuga 1992–94

Performance

- Music Plays Images x Images Play Music 1996–97

Digital Musical Instrument Design

- Tenori-on

Books, magazines and printed matters

- Artist, Designer and Director SCAN (Rikuyosha, 2000)
- 100 Floors House (Kaiseisha, 2008)
- Docchiga!? Books (Books KInokuniya, 2006)

Others

- Docchi Ga Hen?' poster (Tokyu Railways, 2007–2008)
