= Sound Fantasy =

Unreleased video game

- Cover art
- Developers: Nintendo R&D1, Tomcat System
- Publisher: Nintendo
- Producer: Gunpei Yokoi
- Designer: Toshio Iwai
- Platform: Super Nintendo Entertainment System
- Release: Cancelled
- Genre: Music
- Mode: Single-player

Sound Fantasy (Japanese: サウンドファンタジー, Hepburn: Saundofantajī), titled Sound Factory during development, is an unreleased music video game developed by Nintendo and Tomcat System for the Super Nintendo Entertainment System. It was a collaboration between Nintendo and artist Toshio Iwai. who was inspired by his earlier interactive installation art piece titled Music Insects. Development spanned between 1993 and 1994, but it was never released by Nintendo for unknown reasons. The game's key elements were later developed into Maxis's 1996 PC game SimTunes.

== History ==
Interactive media artist Toshio Iwai had built the installation art piece Music Insects, which he created during his time as an Artist in Residence at the San Francisco Exploratorium. Iwai's friend at Nintendo approached him, to convert his Music Insects concept into a video game in 1993. It was developed at Nintendo R&D1, Gunpei Yokoi's unit at Nintendo. There, it was expanded into a four-piece product: one game and three creative titles. During its development from 1993 to 1994, it was previewed in several trade magazines with the name Sound Factory. A trademark for the name "Sound Fantasy" was filed by Nintendo of America on January 13, 1994, and abandoned on January 24, 1999. The resulting Super NES game Sound Fantasy was completed in 1994 and Iwai left his work at Nintendo in favor of another art residency.

The September 1994 issue of Electronic Gaming Monthly expected the game's release in September. It was intended to be bundled with the SNES Mouse and mouse pad (or for ¥6,800 alone) and would be packaged in a large box similar to Super NES games like Mario Paint and EarthBound. Though planned for worldwide release, the release of the finished product was canceled by Nintendo for unknown reasons.

Iwai says he is not sure exactly what happened. Because of personnel changes at Nintendo, he never received a straight answer. Iwai speculates that market challenges from the new 32-bit Sony PlayStation and Sega Saturn, coupled with the success of Nintendo's Donkey Kong Country, with its 3-D look, may have convinced Nintendo executives that they needed more action, not music.

— Wired magazine

In April 2005, to celebrate the Japanese launch of Toshio Iwai's latest work, Electroplankton for the Nintendo DS, Nintendo opened an exhibit at Tokyo's Harajuku Station to focus on the new game and on Iwai himself. Nintendo made available for perusal the box art and manual for Sound Fantasy, but the game was not present.

In August 2010, an exhibit titled The Man Called 'The God of Games' was shown in Harajuku in honor of Gunpei Yokoi (producer of Sound Fantasy). As part of this exhibit, Toshio Iwai hosted his own presentation called "The Genes of Gunpei Yokoi Inside of Me" where he displayed his works that had been inspired by Gunpei Yokoi: the Tenori-on musical instrument and the Sound Fantasy music game. Iwai brought the game cartridge and played it.

A prototype version of the game was leaked online in April 2015.

== Gameplay ==
The back of the US box art

Sound Fantasy contains eccentric concepts and untested game mechanics. Music games, especially on home consoles, were not popular in the early 1990s, and it wouldn't be until much later in the decade that they gained mainstream attention. The Sound Fantasy prototype contains four different games in one cartridge.

Pix Quartet was inspired by Toshio Iwai's Music Insects. There are four insects of different colors, where the player can select different insect to each represent a different instrument. They crawl all over the screen, where the player can draw. Insects that crawl over a colored pixel make a note. Each color represents a different note for each insects. Sample Demos can be loaded to demonstrate the capabilities of this game.

Beat Hopper contains three different modes: A-type, B-type and Training. A-type is a rhythm game in the style of Q*bert, where an insect on a pogo must make every block disappear after stepping on it as many times needed. Each block makes its own sound and the order does not matter. The player can improvise a song with each block. B-type requires the player to follow a path of blocks that appears every time the player touches one. The player must make as many steps as possible without losing three lives.

Ice Sweeper indicates two modes: A-type and B-type. This game is a Breakout clone with a few new twists added after a few stages, such as four bats controlled by a single player.

Star Fly is inspired by music boxes, where the player can set a sequence of stars in the sky, to compose a song. A higher star corresponds to a higher musical note. The player may set the speed and the tone.

== Reception ==
Electronic Gaming Monthly said in 1993 that the prototype of Sound Factory is an "[i]nteresting edutainment game .. similar to Mario Paint". GamePro said in 1994: "What Mario Paint did for video, Sound Fantasy should do for audio". 1up said that "Sound Fantasy made creative use of the mouse that was eventually released with Mario Paint ... [and is] essentially, a music-focused version of Mario Paint".

=== Legacy ===
Having been inspired by their own independent discovery of the Music Insects art installation exhibit, Maxis eventually approached Toshio Iwai, and his gameplay elements seen in Pix Quartet were finally published in the form of the 1996 PC game SimTunes.

== See also ==
- Toshio Iwai, creator of Sound Fantasy
- SimTunes, the PC game that Sound Fantasy's Pix Quartet was converted into
- Electroplankton, Iwai's most recent creation, for the Nintendo DS
