= Joujouka (band) =

Japanese techno group

Joujouka is a Japanese big beat project from Tokyo formed by Takeshi Isogai and Tsuyoshi Suzuki.

== Discography ==
- Joujouka (Matsuri Productions 1998)
- New Asians (Psy-Harmonics / Radiosonic Records 2002)
- Are You Elovetric? (Mad Skippers / Radiosonic Records 2003)
- re-MODEL (Mad Skippers / Radiosonic Records 2004)
- Never Look Back (Mad Skippers / Digilla / Psy-Harmonics 2006)

== Other works ==
- Rez — (2001), (Sega, UGA): Interactive music for the cyberpunk-themed music shooter.
