= Sound Factory =

(The) Sound Factory may refer to:

- The Sound Factory, a recording studio in Los Angeles
- The Sound Factory Bar, a nightclub that was in New York City's Manhattan
- SoundFactory, a Swedish dance house music duo
- Sound Fantasy, a video game titled Sound Factory during development
