= United Game Artists =

Japanese video game developer

United Game Artists Ltd.
- Native name: 株式会社ユナイテッド・ゲーム・アーティスツ
- Romanized name: Kabushiki-gaisha Yunaiteddo gēmu ātisuto
- Type: Division
- Industry: Video games
- Predecessor: AM Annex (1996–1998); Sega Software R&D Dept. #9 (AM9) (1999–2000)
- Founded: 21 April 2000; 26 years ago
- Defunct: 2003
- Fate: Merged into Sonic Team
- Headquarters: Shibuya, Tokyo, Japan
- Key people: Tetsuya Mizuguchi
- Products: Space Channel 5 series Rez
- Parent: Sega
- Website: u-ga.com (archived)

United Game Artists (Note: Japanese: ユナイテッド・ゲーム・アーティスツ, Hepburn: Yunaiteddo gēmu ātisuto) (UGA) was a subsidiary of Sega headquartered in Shibuya, Tokyo, Japan. Established in 2000, UGA was headed by Tetsuya Mizuguchi, who had previously worked at the Sega AM3 division. It is known for developing the Space Channel 5 series and Rez.

In 1996, Mizuguchi and Sega Rally Championship director Kenji Sasaki left AM3 to form AM Annex, and would go on to develop arcade games such as Sega Touring Car Championship and Sega Rally 2. Mizuguchi later left Sasaki's team to form another division briefly known as Sega Consumer Development 4 (CS4), later becoming Research and Development #9 (R&D #9, or AM9). In 2000, the division was spun off into United Game Artists, a wholly owned subsidiary of Sega, with Mizuguchi acting as CEO. In 2003, due to financial issues, UGA was merged into Sonic Team, another of Sega's subsidiary companies. Mizuguchi subsequently left Sega in October of that year.

Several games developed by United Game Artists are notable for their reception. Space Channel 5 is frequently credited with being a unique concept that helped bring about music-based video games. Rez is a highly well received title critically.

== History ==
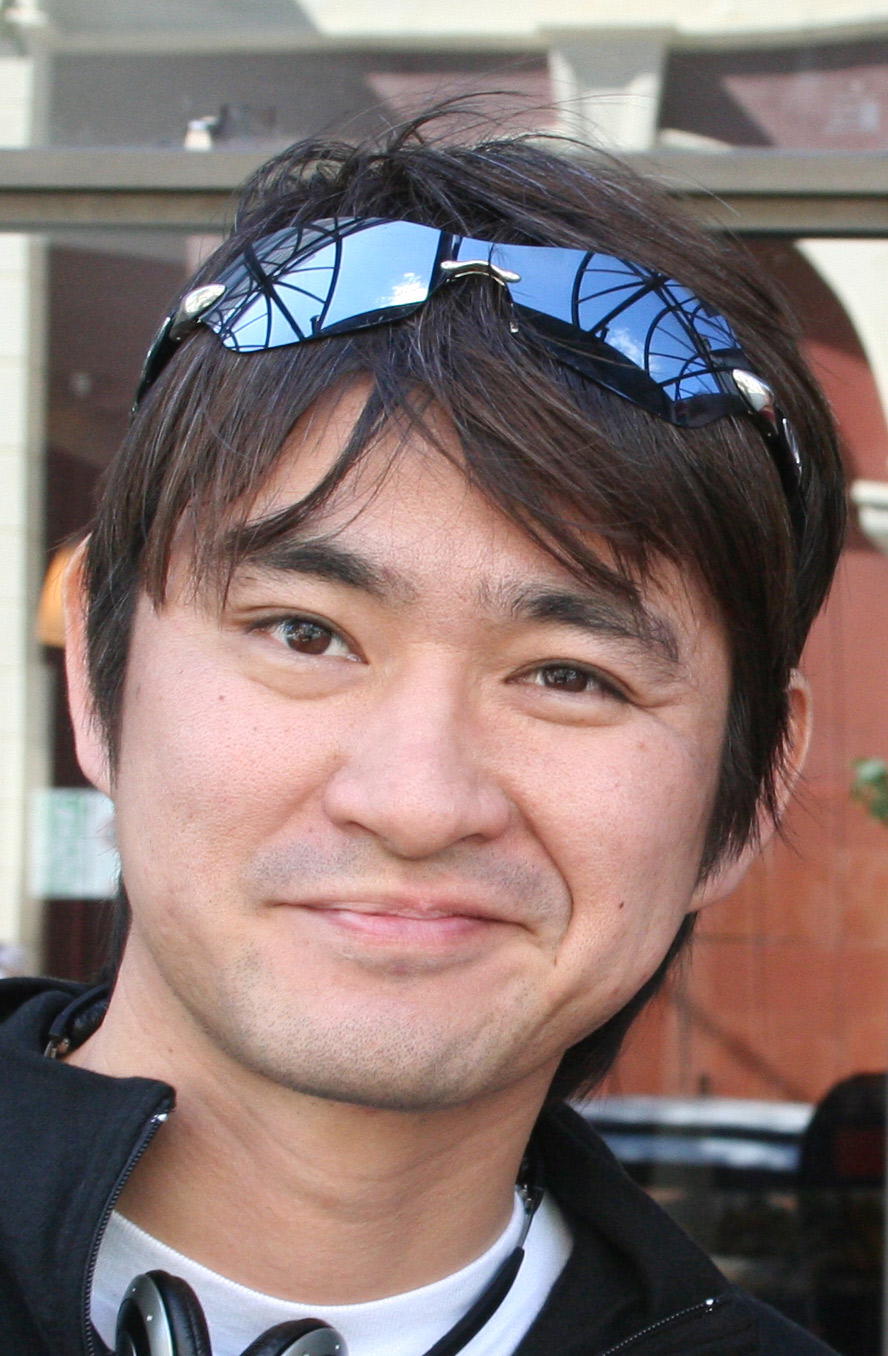
Tetsuya Mizuguchi, founder of AM Annex, which later became United Game Artists

Tetsuya Mizuguchi joined Sega in 1990 as a designer of arcade cabinets. Prior to entering the video game industry, Mizuguchi majored in literature at Nihon University's Faculty of Arts. Asked how he chose a career in video games, he explained, "I preferred doing something in relation to human senses or entertainment - something more in relation with human nature, a field where I could do some research. ... Unlike the arts, where it is often a matter of taste whether something is good or not, creating good interactive entertainment is more easily definable. I chose Sega because it was using new technology and I was able to study things like human movements." Mizuguchi has expressed that he originally had no interest in making video games and wanted to be involved in other areas of entertainment, including creating theme parks and attractions. During his time at Sega, Mizuguchi developed an interactive 'ride' titled Megalopolis combining then-embryonic 3D polygonal graphics and CGI with the physical experience of Sega's hydraulic 'AS-1' motion simulator. He went on to produce the racing simulator Sega Rally Championship and Manx TT Super Bike.

In 1996, while working as a producer for Sega's AM3 division, Mizuguchi met with Hisashi Suzuki, the manager of the division. He and Mizuguchi agreed to create a new department separate from AM3 that would be called AM Annex. Mizuguchi selected the initial team himself, a team of six or seven people that would later grow in number. The first game AM Annex began to develop was Sega Touring Car Championship on the Model 2 arcade board, and Mizuguchi also contributed to Sega Rally 2. According to Hisao Oguchi, later head of AM3, Mizuguchi and developer Kenji Sasaki had departed AM3 with the team of Sega Rally Championship, and Mizuguchi later chose to leave Sasaki after being granted their own AM department and set up development in Shibuya. Sasaki became head of AM5, later renamed Sega Rosso.

Logo of Sega Research and Development #9 (R&D #9) before becoming United Game Artists

Mizuguchi's department in Shibuya would be known as Sega Consumer Development 4 (CS4) and Sega Research and Development #9 (R&D #9), also known as AM9. During this time, the department developed Space Channel 5 for the Dreamcast. Mizuguchi had been tasked by Sega with creating a video game that would have a broad enough appeal to draw in casual female gamers. In order to achieve this, Mizuguchi conducted interviews with girls to find out what they liked. He insists that it is difficult to create a game that appeals to both genders, due to different desires in games. During development of Space Channel 5, Mizuguchi noted one stage in development where the game was "cool, but not so fun", and so he tried to introduce elements inspired by Stomp. In order to lighten the mood with his staff, Mizuguchi invited a mime artist to visit the department and help his team to loosen up.

In 2000, Sega separated its development divisions into subsidiary companies, fully owned by Sega. R&D #9 became United Game Artists (UGA), and Mizuguchi was installed as its CEO. According to Mizuguchi, the name was one he wanted to use for a video game studio for some period of time. Mizuguchi set a goal with UGA to create games for a worldwide audience, but not with any particular genre in mind. In transitioning from racing games to music-based games, Mizuguchi noted that while racing games were a good way to show off CGI graphics, the release of the Dreamcast gave opportunities to engineer better music, and he wanted to incorporate interactivity with music in games.

UGA's next title would be Rez, a musical rail shooter. Mizuguchi initially considered the concept of a video game as an art form after playing Xenon 2 Megablast. Later, while traveling Europe in 1997, Mizuguchi had been taken to the Street Parade in Zurich, during which there was a large electronic dance music concert attended by around 300,000 people. Mizuguchi was taken in by the sights and sounds around him and recognized how this experience was similar to the inspiration that Wassily Kandinsky, a Russian painter, had channeled to "[paint] a canvas of the sounds that he saw". He saw this tie to his previous ideas and envisioned a game where one would shoot down enemies in time to the beat of music that would put the player into a trance, using a theme of synesthesia, forming the basis of Rez. Mizuguchi and his team began to research how to structure this game, visiting clubs and attending Taiko drumming festivals. On pitching Rez to Sega executives, Mizuguchi has expressed that presenting the game was difficult until management was given the opportunity to try the game, due to difficulty in describing the game's concept in words. Rez was well received upon release, as were its re-releases on later consoles.

The final release for UGA would be Space Channel 5: Part 2. According to Mizuguchi, despite low sales of the original game, Part 2 was easier to pitch than Rez had been due to there being an established base of fans of the original, as well as the prominence of mobile phones and MTV. Part 2 was designed using real-time graphics instead of the pre-rendered backgrounds of the original game in order to make the game appear more like a movie. Space Channel 5: Part 2 was released in Europe and Japan, but would not make its debut in the United States until the release of the compilation Space Channel 5 Special Edition for the PlayStation 2.

In September 2003, Sega performed an internal restructuring of its staff. Among these changes was the dissolution of United Game Artists and the transfer of its members into Sonic Team. The following month, Mizuguchi left Sega. According to Mizuguchi on his decision, "At that time, I had two choices, basically. One was to adjust with the company, or the company adjusts to me, but the latter was impossible. So I decided to leave Sega. To me, I think this is a very healthy choice, because I get to do my own games now." Mizuguchi would go on to found Q Entertainment. He has expressed that he would be open to working with Sega again.

== Games developed ==
=== As AM Annex ===
Year	Title	Platform(s)
1996	Sega Touring Car Championship	Arcade
1998	Sega Rally 2	Arcade
1998	Star Wars Trilogy Arcade	Arcade

=== As AM9 ===
Year	Title	Platform(s)
1999	Space Channel 5	Dreamcast, PlayStation 2

=== As United Game Artists ===
Year	Title	Platform(s)
2001	Rez	Dreamcast, PlayStation 2
2002	Space Channel 5: Part 2	Dreamcast, PlayStation 2

== Reception ==
The titles developed by Mizuguchi's teams at Sega and United Game Artists are renowned for their development and uniqueness. The Sega Rally series retained a level of popularity over a decade after its release, resulting in the later development of Sega Rally 2006. Of the Sega Rally series, Mizuguchi told members of his former staff, "it's your game, not mine!", giving credit to his team for the game. Mizuguchi also credited his work on racing games with AM Annex as being the best way to show off CGI graphics at the time. Space Channel 5 did not sell well, but has been retrospectively called a "highlight" on the Dreamcast and described as "unlike anything before it." USA Today gave the Dreamcast version all four stars and said it was "all about fun, and [Space Channel 5] delivers with a song." Entertainment Weekly gave the same version an A− and said that "gamers of all ages undoubtedly will want to help Ulala get her groove back — if not get their hands on a pair of those boots." IGN's Travis Fahs called Space Channel 5 "a product somehow greater than the sum of its parts", and that the presentation of Part 2 "had been polished to such a degree that it elevated the game to a new level."

Rez, in particular, has received much positive feedback and several re-releases. The game received an award from The Agency for Cultural Affairs Media Art Festival in Japan. Writing for Games in 2002, reviewer Thomas L. McDonald described Rez as "a game that carves out its own niche: the art-house abstract musical rail-shooter", and emphasized the game's differences from traditional rhythm games while noting that "the result is awesome, but trying to describe it in words is like trying to sculpt Jell-O. Simply put, it's like nothing you've ever seen before." The game would go on to receive "Runner Up" in the category of "Electronic - Puzzle and Classic" in Games's annual "The Games 100". In 2009, Edge ranked the game #49 on its list of "The 100 Best Games To Play Today", calling it "Astonishing to watch [and] uniquely absorbing to play". In 2012, Rez was listed on Time's all-time 100 greatest video games list. Rez would later be re-released in 2007 for the Xbox 360 as Rez HD, which Mizuguchi noted during the show that he "always dreamed of a high-def wide screen and very good sound", and described the game as "100 percent the same game" as the original Dreamcast version. After seeing the potential for virtual reality, Mizuguchi created a new development studio, Enhance Games, to redevelop Rez for VR gaming as Rez Infinite for the PlayStation 4. Rez Infinite received widespread acclaim from critics. Review aggregate Metacritic assigned the game a score of 89 out of 100, based on 44 reviews, making Rez Infinite the highest rated PSVR game on the site. The game received unanimous praise for its immersion, sense of place, visual and sound design, and its new level Area X. Despite the age of its previous iterations, many reviewers considered it to be the finest PSVR title to date, and an essential game for anyone owning the device. Martin Robinson of Eurogamer called the game a "modern masterpiece", and Alexa Ray Corriea of GameSpot considered it to be "a new classic". Lucas Sullivan of GamesRadar thought that the game "achieves its full potential with PSVR", while Edge summarized "Rez Infinite is 15 years old, and the best VR game of 2016."

According to Fahs, United Game Artists has a legacy connected with that of the Dreamcast, even though all of their games were ported to the PlayStation 2. He stated that elements of what was UGA can be found in Sonic Team games Feel the Magic: XY/XX and The Rub Rabbits!, and that when it comes to their legacy, "UGA turned trite criticisms of 'style over substance' into a badge of honor. Their short run proved just how far dazzling presentation could go."

== See also ==
- Sega development studios
- Sega AM1
- Sega AM2
- Sega AM3
- Amusement Vision
- Smilebit
- Sonic Team
