= Magical Chinese Girl Paipai! =

Television series

- Genre: Tokusatsu; Magical girl
- Created by: Shotaro Ishinomori
- Directed by: Tarō Sakamoto
- Starring: Natsuki Ozawa; Takanobu Yumoto; Kazuki Yamanaka; Daisuke Ishigami; Shigeru Saiki; Rie Shibata; Shun Ueda; Hidekazu Nagae; Masakazu Arai; Ren Osugi; Isamu Ichikawa; Hiroo Oikawa; Atsuo Mori; Torauemon Utazawa; Yōsuke Ishii
- Opening theme: "Ano Ko ga Machi ni Yattekita!" Performed by Hiroko Asakawa
- Ending theme: "Hoshizora no Diary" Performed by Hiroko Asakawa
- Composer: Yūsuke Honma
- Country of origin: Japan
- Original language: Japanese
- No. of episodes: 26

Production
- Running time: approx. 24 minutes
- Production company: Toei

Original release
- Network: Fuji TV
- Release: January 15 – July 9, 1989

Magical Chinese Girl Paipai! (魔法少女ちゅうかなぱいぱい!, Mahō Shōjo Chūkana Paipai), also known as Magical Girl Chukana Paipai, is a Japanese tokusatsu drama television series produced by Toei Company. It was originally broadcast from January 15, 1989, to July 9, 1989. Toei gave this series the name The Good Little Witch for international distribution.

== Story ==
After Paipai escaped from the Chinese Magic Realm to Japan after King Gomoku tried to get her to marry him instead of Raymond, she keeps getting pursued by King Gomoku's henchmen, Nurhaci and Taklamakan. In the human world, where she stays with the Takayama family, Paipai has to conceal her magical identity from the humans.
