= Sega Touring Car Championship =

1996 video game

- European Saturn cover art
- Developer: Sega AM Annex
- Publisher: Sega (Note: Released for the Saturn under the Sega Sports banner.)
- Director: Kenji Sasaki
- Producer: Tetsuya Mizuguchi
- Programmer: Sohei Yamamoto
- Artist: Kenji Sasaki
- Platforms: Arcade, Sega Saturn, Windows
- Release: Arcade: JP: September 1996; NA: 1996; EU: 1996; Saturn: EU: November 7, 1997; NA: November 24, 1997; JP: November 27, 1997; Windows: NA: February 19, 1998; JP: February 27, 1998; EU: 1998
- Genre: Racing
- Modes: Single-player, multiplayer
- Arcade system: Sega Model 2

Sega Touring Car Championship (セガ ツーリングカーチャンピオンシップ) is an arcade racing game released by Sega's AM Annex for the Model 2 mainboard in 1996. It was later ported to the Sega Saturn and Microsoft Windows.

The game was housed in a sit-down cabinet with speakers installed on either side of the player's head and a subwoofer under the seat. Sega Touring Car Championship received mixed reviews, with critics generally commenting that it has a remarkable sense of speed and realism, but that those factors also make the game excessively difficult.

== Gameplay ==
The game has four tracks, one of which is a secret track unlocked by reaching the final race of the season. The Saturn port includes an unlockable fifth track, allows players to create customized cars and save them to memory, and uses a split screen for multiplayer modes.

== Development ==
The game was developed by a 15-person hand-picked team led by Sega AM3's Tetsuya Mizuguchi. This team, a new internal Sega division called Sega AM Annex, consisted of both staff who had transferred from other Sega departments and newly hired employees. Mizuguchi stated, "We wanted good working conditions, and our new department is small. From a creativity point of view, big teams have advantages and disadvantages. We certainly don't believe that it's bad to be separated from AM3. Before creating the department, I explained the concept to AM3's manager and then to Higashi Suzuki, the head of amusement machine development at Sega. Together we all agreed that creating a new department, separate from AM3, would be a good thing."

Mizuguchi was inspired to create Sega Touring Car Championship by a video he saw of the Deutsche Tourenwagen Meisterschaft (German Touring Car Championship) while he was working on Manx TT Super Bike. He described the impression the video made on him: "When I saw the inside of the cars they looked just like F1 Grand Prix. Incredible! The race was full of cars crashing into each other. The competition looked so straight forward and unreserved. Also, all the countries are different so it has a nationalistic battle atmosphere to it." Development began in April 1996.

To research the game, the staff watched videos, read magazines and books, attended races, and in some cases rode as passengers in real Touring Cars driven by championship drivers. The engine sounds were all sampled from real cars. Mizuguchi recounted that acquiring the rights to use the numerous sponsorship stickers which appear in the game "wasn't so much difficult, more like time consuming. In a fairly short period of time we had to meet a lot of people and get numerous approvals etcetera. I myself went to Europe and the United States around three times and [assistant producer] Mr. Taniguchi also went once."

The team decided to use a techno soundtrack to fit the game's sense of acceleration. They contacted the record label Avex Trax, who produced for them several tracks from well-known artists from Belgium and Italy, and held auditions to select the four Japanese musicians who recorded the remaining tracks.

When the game was subjected to location tests, many players complained that the game was difficult, but the team decided not to rework the game based on this because they could not reduce the difficulty without making compromises on the realism, which they did not want to do.

During the final fine-tuning stage of development, race driver Naoki Hattori "test drove" the game and gave advice to the AM Annex team. The completed game was displayed at the September 1996 Japan Amusement Machine and Marketing Association show.

=== Home versions ===
The Sega Saturn conversion of the game was announced at the April 1997 Tokyo Game Show, with Mizuguchi on hand to show a demo of the game. The conversion was handled by one of Sega's CS (consumer division) teams, but was overseen by the original AM Annex team, who also designed the Saturn-exclusive modes.

A home version for PC was also released in 1998. Two rally cars from Sega Rally Championship are unlockable in the home console versions, the Toyota Celica GT-Four (ST205) and the Lancia Delta HF Integrale.

Columbia Music Entertainment released a music video/racing techniques 45' VHS in Japan to promote the Sega Saturn version.

== German Touring Car Championship ==
This "Touring Car Championship" is actually based upon the famous Deutsche Tourenwagen Meisterschaft (DTM) '95 and '96 series (German Touring Car Championship) where three European makers were competing at this time. Although the DTM cars are licensed, the three courses named "Country Circuit", "Grünwalt Circuit" and "Brickwall Town" (as well as the bonus stages) are all fictitious, though they are designed like real racing circuits, complete with grandstands and pit roads. Since it was released one year after the original arcade version, the Sega Saturn port includes both the DTM'95 series and ITC'96 series. The Toyota Supra doesn't compete at DTM, but at JGTC GT500 instead.

== Sega Touring Car Championship Special ==
Following from Sega Rally Special Stage, a Sega Touring Car Championship Special (セガツーリングカーチャンピオンシップスペシャル) attraction version was specially designed for the "Tokyo Joypolis" (in Shinjuku district) theme park featuring real cars instead of the common single/dual-seat cabinet. On this ultimate version, the player physically select his car, seat in the Toyota Supra, AMG-Mercedes C-Class or Alfa Romeo 155 and watched on a huge widescreen through the vehicle's windscreen. Changes were made since the original version as now up to three players could race in a multiplayer mode; the game broadcast live on three public screens, while the Opel Calibra and the external car view were removed from the so-called "Special" version. Later, this rare attraction was made available in the Kyoto and Okayama Joypolis game centers too.

== Reception ==
Reception

Aggregate score
Aggregator	Score
GameRankings	66% (SAT); 44% (PC)

Review scores
Publication	Score
Electronic Gaming Monthly	6.5/10 (SAT)
GameSpot	5/10 (SAT)
IGN	5/10 (PC)
Next Generation	3/5 (ARC); 4/5 (SAT); 2/5 (PC)
Sega Saturn Magazine	79% (SAT)

Upon the game's release in arcades, a Next Generation critic remarked that "where this title truly excels is also where, in its way, it fails: Sega Touring Car is the most painstakingly realistic driving game yet." He elaborated that the game requires extreme precision to avoid crashing during turns, and the unforgiving difficulty means the player must often find ways to shave fractions of a second off completion times. He also complimented the force feedback steering wheel and the soundtrack.

The Saturn version received mixed reviews, though most critics regarded it as a major disappointment given what a high-profile release it was for the console. While reviews widely remarked that Sega Touring Car Championship has a lack of slowdown and overall sense of speed which is virtually unprecedented for a home console racer, they also said that the controls are overly touchy and never feel quite right even when the player takes the time and practice needed to adjust to them. As a result, the Saturn version has the same punishing difficulty as the arcade release. Kelly Rickards commented on this in Electronic Gaming Monthly: "Now although it's much easier to shave those precious milliseconds off your time when you don't have to pay a buck per play, the Saturn version is still one of the more challenging racing games in recent memory. ... This game is too hardcore even for me and that's scary." Most critics said that the control is better with the Saturn analog pad, but that using one does not overcome the essential control issues. However, Rickards' co-reviewers Crispin Boyer and John Ricciardi and Next Generation all denied the control problems altogether, stating that the controls work well with either the analog pad or standard Saturn joypad. Next Generation had a positive impression of the Saturn version in general, concluding that "Touring Car caps off the Sega racing franchise on Saturn very well. It also demonstrates that if you want the best in hard-core arcade racing, Saturn still has what it takes."

Other critics found the Saturn conversion was compounded with problems besides the difficult controls. GameSpot complained at the small number of tracks and the lack of licensing compared to competing racers, and summed the game up as a mixed bag with merits which are not enough to justify putting up with its shortcomings. Sega Saturn Magazine opined that the conversion was too ambitious, bringing over a level of detail and special effects (like the rear-view mirror) from the arcade version which the Saturn simply could not cope with at a stable frame rate. Additionally noting the amount of polygon glitching and the rough textures, they deemed it "possibly the weakest arcade-to-Saturn conversion to date, bar the godawful Sky Target." GamePro similarly criticized the rough, low-resolution textures, and additionally dismissed the music as "17 indistinguishable dance mixes". They concluded that though the game has its merits, most Saturn gamers would be better off replaying the by-then two years old Sega Rally Championship.

Next Generation reviewed the PC version of the game, and stated that "As it stands, Touring Car is a decent choice for those without access to the Saturn version of the game (which is definitely superior)."

M! Games gave it a score of 65 out of 100, calling it a fun game, but saying that the controls were sluggish and dampened the quality of the game significantly.

== See also ==
- Virtua Racing
- Daytona USA
- Sega Rally Championship
- Scud Race
- Le Mans 24
- Ferrari F355 Challenge
- Initial D Arcade Stage
