= Natsuki Ozawa =

Japanese pornographic actress (born 1972)

- 小沢 なつき
- Born: April 19, 1972 (age 54); Oizumigakuen, Nerima, Tokyo, Japan
- Occupation: Actress

Natsuki Ozawa (Japanese: 小沢 なつき, Hepburn: Ozawa Natsuki) (born April 19, 1972) is a Japanese singer, actress and AV actress who has appeared in mainstream films and adult videos.

== Life and career ==
As a teenager, Ozawa had roles in two 1987 films, the youth action comedy Be-Bop High School: Koko yotaro march and the fantasy Nineteen. She also had a featured role in the 1988 slapstick comedy Yamadamura waltz. As a singer, Ozawa released two J-pop CD albums during these years, Chocolate Candle (Dec. 9, 1987) and Natsuki Dreaming (Aug. 26, 1988). In 1989 Ozawa starred as the magical fairy Paipai in the 26-episode Fuji TV series of that name. Ozawa also starred in the 1995 V-cinema production Zero Woman 2, the second sequel to Miki Sugimoto's 1974 film.

Ozawa was one of the two young stars (along with Naomi Akimoto) of director Toshiki Satō's 1996 lesbian-themed film Atashi wa juice (aka I Am Juice). In 2000, Ozawa had a role in the yakuza zombie movie Junk distributed by Japan Home Video.

After a number of years away from the entertainment industry, Ozawa created a stir when she made her debut as an AV performer in April 2004 with the video Decision (決心) for the Alice Japan studio, the AV subsidiary of Japan Home Video. Ozawa made several more featured actress AVs with Alice Japan over the next two years. In 2007 and in 2009, Alice Japan released two videos on their Alice Pink label which collected scenes from Ozawa's previous videos remastered in the new thinner mosaic used to censor the genitals in all Japanese AVs.

== Filmography ==
=== Mainstream film & TV ===
- Be-Bop High School: Koko yotaro march (ビー・バップ・ハイスクール 高校与太郎行進曲) (March 1987) - Saki
- Nineteen (１９ ナインティーン) (August 1987)
- Yamadamura waltz (山田村ワルツ) (February 1988) - Reika Ayakoji
- Hana no Asuka-gumi! (1988 TV series) - Miko
- Magical Chinese Girl Paipai! (魔法少女 ちゅうかなぱいぱい！) (1989 TV series) - Paipai
- Zero Woman (1995 aka Zero Woman 2) - Rei
- Atashi wa juice (アタシはジュース) (July 1996)
- Junk (January 2000)

=== Adult videos (AV) ===
Released	Video title	Company	Director	Notes
2004-04-30	Decision 決心	Alice Japan; KA-2171	Yoshinori Kasuga	
2004-05-21	Idols アイドルの性	Alice Japan; KA-2174		
2004-06-18	Y-Setsu Model 猥褻モデル	Alice Japan; KA-2178		
2004-07-30	Mejiri: Natsuki Ozawa 女尻 小沢なつき	Alice Japan; KA-2184	Takao Nakano	
2004-08-27	Confined Training Teacher 女教師監禁飼育	Alice Japan Babylon; KR-9213	Shigeo Katsuyama	
2004-09-30	The Contrary Soap Heaven: Natsuki Ozawa 逆ソープ天国 小沢なつき	Alice Japan Babylon; KR-9215	Shigeo Katsuyama	
2005-11-18	Widow in Mourning Dress 喪服の未亡人	Alice Japan Babylon; KR-9242	Shigeo Katsuyama	
2005-12-23	Female Private Eye's Lewd Investigation デキる女探偵のやりすぎ調査	Alice Japan Babylon; KR-9246	Kazutoshi Goto	
2006-01-27	Step-mother was an Idol 義母は元アイドル	Alice Japan Babylon; KR-9250	Shigeo Katsuyama	
2006-02-24	Bitch Fucks Her 牝に犯られる女	Alice Japan Babylon; KR-9254	Yuji Sakamoto	Lesbian
2006-03-31	Natsuki Ozawa becomes a Prostitute! 風俗で小沢なつきとしたいっ！	Alice Japan Babylon; KR-9256	Kazutoshi Goto	
2007-07-05	Alice Pink File New Mosaic Standard アリスピンクファイル あの新基準モザイクで魅せる!	Alice Japan Alice Pink; PDV-004		Compilation
2009-07-10	Natsuki Ozawa Alice Pink File 2 アリスピンクファイル 小沢なつき２	Alice Japan Alice Pink; PDV-074		Compilation

== Photobooks ==
- Natsuki Ozawa, Totteoki Sumairu 小沢なつき とっておきスマイル March 10, 1988, publisher: Kodansha (non-nude)
- Itsunomanika Seishojo いつのまにか青少女 March 10, 1989, publisher: Wani Books (non-nude)
- Natsuki Ozawa Photobook: Alone (小沢なつき写真集 alone December 20, 1995, publisher: P-PRESS (nude)

== See also ==
- Otocky, Japanese video game endorsed by Natsuki Ozawa
