= Feel the Magic: XY/XX =

2004 video game

Feel the Magic XY/XX
- North American box art
- Developer: Sonic Team
- Publisher: Sega
- Director: Takumi Yoshinaga
- Producer: Yojiro Ogawa
- Designers: Emiko Sunaga; Takako Nagase
- Artist: Nanako Yarimizu
- Writer: Chizuru Asyura
- Composers: Naofumi Hataya; Tomoko Sasaki; Mariko Nanba
- Platform: Nintendo DS
- Release: NA: November 21, 2004; JP: December 2, 2004; AU: February 24, 2005; EU: March 11, 2005
- Genre: Mini-games
- Mode: Single-player

Feel the Magic: XY/XX, known in Japan as Kimi no Tame nara Shineru (きみのためなら死ねる; lit. 'I would die for you') and in Europe and Australia as Project Rub, is a minigame video game compilation developed by Sonic Team and published by Sega for the Nintendo DS handheld game console. It was released in North America in November 2004, December 2004 in Japan, February 2005 in Australia, and March 2005 in Europe.

It follows the attempts of a young male protagonist trying to impress a young woman while being aided by a group of people known as the "Rub Rabbits". The game consists of a series of minigames in relation to the overall plot. These minigames are all controlled only by the Nintendo DS touch screen and microphone.

== Plot ==
Feel the Magic: XY/XX follows the events of a young man who meets a girl and instantly falls in love; however, she is not nearly as receptive, and the protagonist attempts to win her over, ranging from romantic gestures to protecting her from a stampede of bulls. As he attempts this, he is assisted and cheered on by a group of men called the "Rub Rabbits"; however, he is also pursued by a romantic rival antagonist, vying for the girl's affection, using his incredible intelligence and technology to steal her from him.

== Gameplay ==
One of the minigames from Feel the Magic: XY/XX called "Goldfish"

Feel the Magic: XY/XX is played solely with the stylus and microphone, and features a voice recognition system through both speaking and breathing. It is composed of several minigames that are loosely linked, as the player tries to impress the girl.

There are three main modes of play. Story mode is the main mode which contains the minigames in each chapter with three levels of difficulty, 'Normal', 'Hard', and 'Hell'. Memories is a gameplay mode where one can play any of the previous minigames previously beaten. Stars can be collected in Memories, that can unlock certain pieces of clothing. The third mode, Maniac, is where one is able to take all the articles of clothing earned during the game to dress up the girl.

There are other features in the game. It can be played in English or Japanese, allowing it to be import friendly. 'Hidden Rabbits' can be collected in the cutscenes through Story mode, and after collecting enough, clothing can be unlocked. There are 60 Hidden Rabbits. After completing the game, the Sound Test is unlocked, where the sound effects and music can be listened to. Feel the Magic: XY/XX has automatic saves.

== Development ==
In 2003, Sega dissolved United Game Artists (UGA), one of its internal game development studios. The head of the studio, Tetsuya Mizuguchi, left Sega that year to form Q Entertainment. Former members of UGA, such as Space Channel 5 veterans Takumi Yoshinaga and Takashi Yuda, were merged into Sonic Team. At Sonic Team, Yuda produced Sonic Riders, while Yoshinaga created Feel The Magic (as well as its prequel, The Rub Rabbits!). Development on the latter title began after Nintendo unveiled the Nintendo DS hardware, which features a touch screen that can be rubbed with a stylus. After observing that the word "rub" sounds similar to the word "love", Yoshinaga decided to create a game built around both concepts. A "love comedy story" was the basis for the title's plot; Yoshinaga chose to represent its characters with silhouettes to allow greater room for player interpretation. Although this subject matter was suggestive, Yoshinaga had no desire to include overtly sexual content, and considered the input of the predominantly female development team to avoid incorporating offensive material.

Feel the Magic: XY/XX was originally announced at E3 2004 under its code name, Project Rub. Then-executive managing director Yuji Naka said the title would place "an emphasis on controls using a Touch Screen, which will allow us to achieve the concept of 'rubbing,' a unique and fun gameplay mechanic made possible by the DS. We will investigate a wide-range of gaming elements unique to DS, so look forward to future Sega titles." Game details and previews came much later, in October.

== Reception and legacy ==
Reception

Aggregate score
Aggregator	Score
Metacritic	75/100

Review scores
Publication	Score
Edge	6/10
Electronic Gaming Monthly	8/10
Eurogamer	7/10
Famitsu	33/40
Game Informer	8.5/10
GamePro	4.5/5
GameRevolution	C−
GameSpot	7.7/10
GameSpy	3.5/5
IGN	7.8/10
Nintendo Power	4.6/5
The Sydney Morning Herald	3/5
The Times	5/5

The game received "generally favorable reviews" according to the review aggregation website Metacritic. In Japan, Famitsu gave it a score of one eight, one nine, one seven, and one nine for a total of 33 out of 40. It received a runner-up placements in GameSpot's 2004 "Best Puzzle/Rhythm Game" and "Most Innovative Game" award categories across all platforms, losing both to Katamari Damacy.

Author Torill Elvira Mortensen used Feel the Magic as a good example of a game that makes use of its respective console's technology. Torill noted that after its release, it was considered the best game for the Nintendo DS in terms of its utilization of the DS' touch screen and microphone. Torill also noted that its humor and its gameplay were appealing to reviewers.

The Times gave it all five stars and said that the game "makes no use of the DS’s wireless communication feature, so there is no multiplayer event. Still, this off-beat gem is a must-have game for any fledgling DS collection." The New York Times gave it a favorable review and said that it "often lets you bypass annoying games in favor of entertaining ones, so the ratio of fun to aggravation is pretty good." However, The Sydney Morning Herald gave it three stars out of five, saying, "Completed mini-games can be played individually with increasing difficulty, but there is little long-term appeal once the delightfully barmy story has finished."

On February 2, 2006, the game won the "Best Concept" award at the 2006 Imagina Games Awards. Game Informer named the game one of the top ten weirdest of all time.

A prequel to Feel the Magic: XY/XX, titled The Rub Rabbits!, was released in Japan in 2005. Later it released in North America and Europe in 2006.

The color scheme along with the black and blue rabbits in the 2020 Nintendo 3DS title The Queen TV-Game 2 were inspired by the visual design of Feel the Magic: XY/XX.
