= The Rub Rabbits! =

2005 video game

- Developer: Sonic Team
- Publisher: Sega
- Director: Takumi Yoshinaga
- Producer: Masahiro Kumono
- Designers: Emiko Sunaga; Takako Nagase
- Programmer: Yoshihiko Toyoshima
- Artist: Nanako Yarimizu
- Composers: Naofumi Hataya; Tomoko Sasaki
- Platform: Nintendo DS
- Release: JP: October 20, 2005; NA: February 7, 2006; EU: February 10, 2006
- Genre: Mini-games
- Mode: Single-player

The Rub Rabbits!, known in Japan as Aka-chan wa Doko Kara Kuru no? (赤ちゃんはどこからくるの?; lit. "Where do Babies Come From?"), is a minigame compilation video game developed by Sonic Team and published by Sega for the Nintendo DS handheld video game console. It was first released in Japan on October 20, 2005, and was later released in North America on February 7, 2006, and in Europe three days later. It is a prequel to Feel the Magic: XY/XX.

== Plot ==
The premise of the game is that the player's female love interest gets into perilous situations or is placed out of reach from the male protagonist. A minigame must be completed in order to rescue her, or sometimes, get the male protagonist out of trouble. All of these minigames require use of the stylus, and the DS to be held in a certain way, even upside-down. Some require use of the DS's built-in microphone.

== Gameplay ==
Some examples of these minigames are:

- The male protagonist runs up a downward moving escalator, and must avoid Sumo wrestlers along the way by moving left and right. There is a similar variation where he paddles up a river avoiding giant crocodiles.
- The mysterious girl in lavender ties the protagonist to a chair and throws various food items at him. He must avoid eating the purple cakes, but can eat the other morsels like pizzas and white-iced cakes.
- The female love interest performs yoga, while the male protagonist tries to keep a sweet-smelling rose within the range of her sense of smell.

The player's performance is graded as an amount of 'Hearts', which are given at the end of a minigame depending on how well they did.

There are a few multiplayer minigames which involve four differently coloured protagonists competing over the love interest, such as an elimination based game of catching an ever-growing beach ball which eventually explodes, and log rafting while trying to rescue the female from the water, while trying to steal her from other player's log rafts.

== Reception ==
Reception

Aggregate score
Aggregator	Score
Metacritic	68/100

Review scores
Publication	Score
Electronic Gaming Monthly	5.67/10
Eurogamer	8/10
Famitsu	32/40
Game Informer	7.5/10
GamePro	4.5/5
GameRevolution	C−
GameSpot	6.2/10
GameSpy	3.5/5
GameZone	7/10
IGN	8/10
Nintendo Power	8/10
Detroit Free Press	3/4
The Times	1/5

The game received "average" reviews according to the review aggregation website Metacritic. In Japan, Famitsu gave it a score of two eights, one seven, and one nine for a total of 32 out of 40.

Detroit Free Press gave it a score of three stars out of four and stated, "The music here and the design all are distinctly Japanese, with crazy refrains like "Rub it!" being shouted all the time. Don't ask me to explain. Just pick up and enjoy." However, The A.V. Club gave it a C+, saying that "True love takes more than moony-eyed flirting; Sega needs to get the mechanics right to make the magic happen." The Sydney Morning Herald gave it two-and-a-half stars out of five, stating that the game is "inventive, creative and strangely compelling, but the more difficult tasks can be frustrating and its lasting appeal is limited." The Times gave it one star out of five and called it "mind-bogglingly shallow".
