= Yamaha Tenori-on =

Electronic musical instrument

Tenori-on
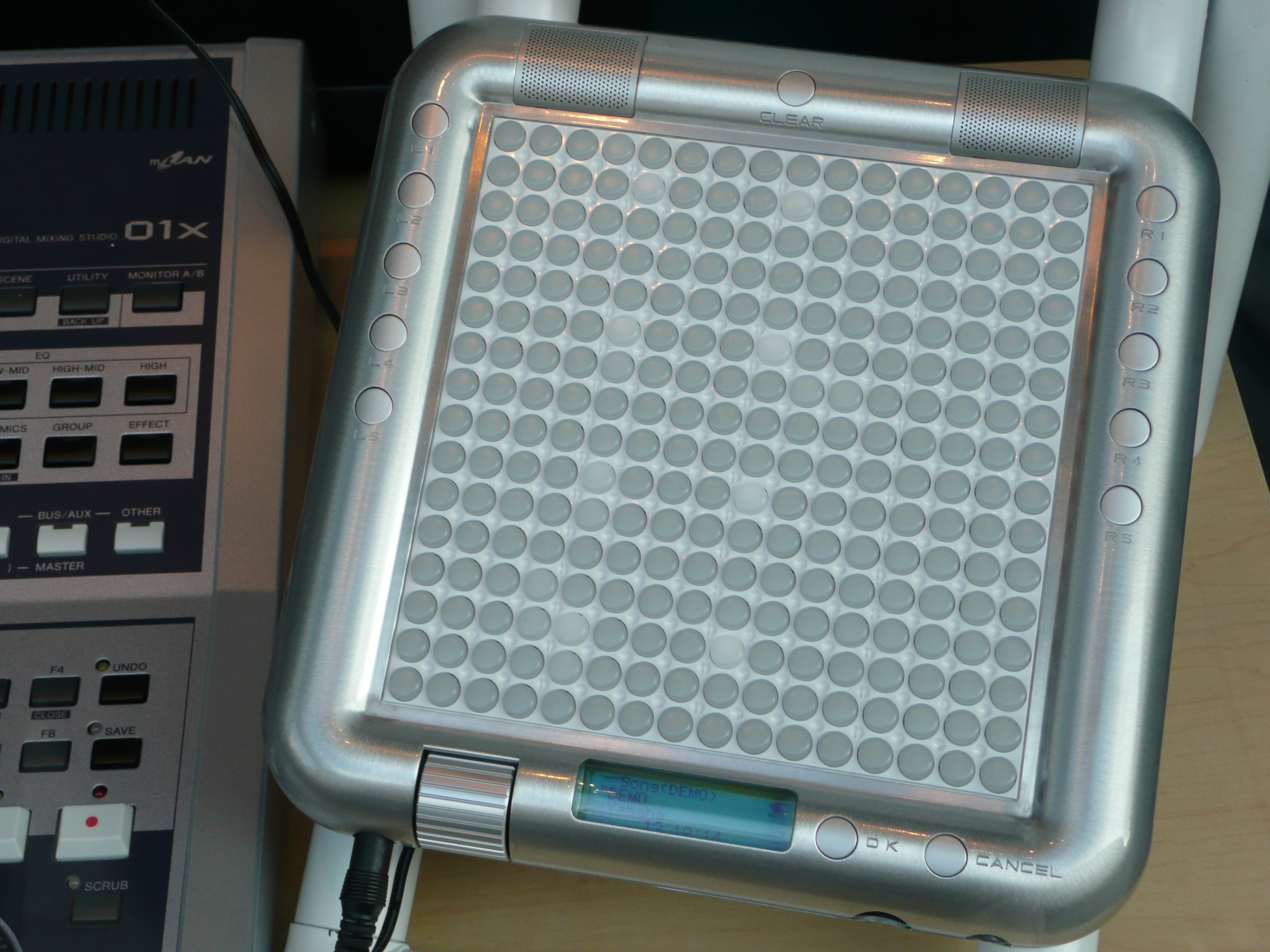
- Manufacturer: Yamaha
- Dates: 2007
- Price: £599

Technical specifications
- Polyphony: 32-note
- Timbrality: 16-part
- Synthesis type: PCM (AWM2)
- Aftertouch expression: No
- Velocity expression: Yes
- Effects: Reverb, chorus

Input/output
- Keyboard: 16×16 grid
- External control: MIDI

The Yamaha Tenori-on is an electronic musical instrument designed and created by the Japanese artist Toshio Iwai and Yu Nishibori of the Music and Human Interface Group at the Yamaha Center for Advanced Sound Technology.

== Description ==
The Tenori-on consists of a hand-held screen in which a sixteen-by-sixteen grid of LED switches are held within a magnesium plastic frame. Any of these switches may be activated in a number of different ways to create sounds. Two built-in speakers are located on the top of the frame, as well as a dial and buttons that control the type of sound and beats per minute produced.

There are two versions of the device available. The original TNR-W (Tenori-On White) features a magnesium frame, 256 rear panel LEDs and can run on batteries whilst the more affordable TNR-O (Tenori-On Orange) features a white plastic frame, has no rear LEDs and does not take batteries. The modes and sound sets in these instruments are the same.

Both devices have an LCD screen on the bottom edge of the frame. Using the connection function, it is possible to play a synchronized session, or to send and receive songs between two of the devices.

In 2001 Toshio Iwai did a limited-edition release of a simple step sequencer for the handheld game console WonderSwan, named Tenori-on (テノリオン). This non-game would be the precursor to the more advanced 2005 version released together with Yamaha.

The Yamaha Tenori-on was demonstrated at SIGGRAPH 2005 held in Los Angeles in August, 2005. A detailed discussion of the design of the Tenori-on is given in a paper presented at NIME 2006 conference held at IRCAM, Centre Pompidou in Paris, France in June, 2006.

Toshio Iwai has been using the Tenori-on in live performances (such as at Sónar in Barcelona, in June 2006, and Futuresonic in Manchester] in July 2006, the Futuresonic 2006 live show had some good feedback from the audience and that was one of the most important triggers to make it a real product). The instrument was launched in London on September 4, 2007, for a recommended retail price of $1,200 (£599). To promote this launch, three prominent electronic and experimental musicians -- Jim O'Rourke, Atom Heart, and Robert Lippok—were invited to compose "demo" tracks utilizing the device. These tracks have since been released as promotional MP3s from the Tenori-on website.

Iwai's intention was to create an electronic instrument of beauty.

In days gone by, a musical instrument had to have a beauty, of shape as well as of sound, and had to fit the player almost organically. [...] Modern electronic instruments don't have this inevitable relationship between the shape, the sound, and the player. What I have done is to try to bring back these [...] elements and build them in to a true musical instrument for the digital age.

The instrument builds on Iwai's previous work, such as his Electroplankton software for the Nintendo DS in the blending of light and sound, as well as the aesthetic elements of the interface.

A World Tour introducing Tenori-on began in Frankfurt, Germany, on March 12, and finished in Tokyo on 25 April 2008. Artists on the tour included Jim O'Rourke, Atom Heart, To Rococo Rot, Pole, Robert Lippok, Sutekh, The Books, Krikor, Safety Scissors, I Am Robot and Proud, Lou6Journey and Nathan Michel. It is also featured as the Tonematrix on Audiotool.

== Performers ==
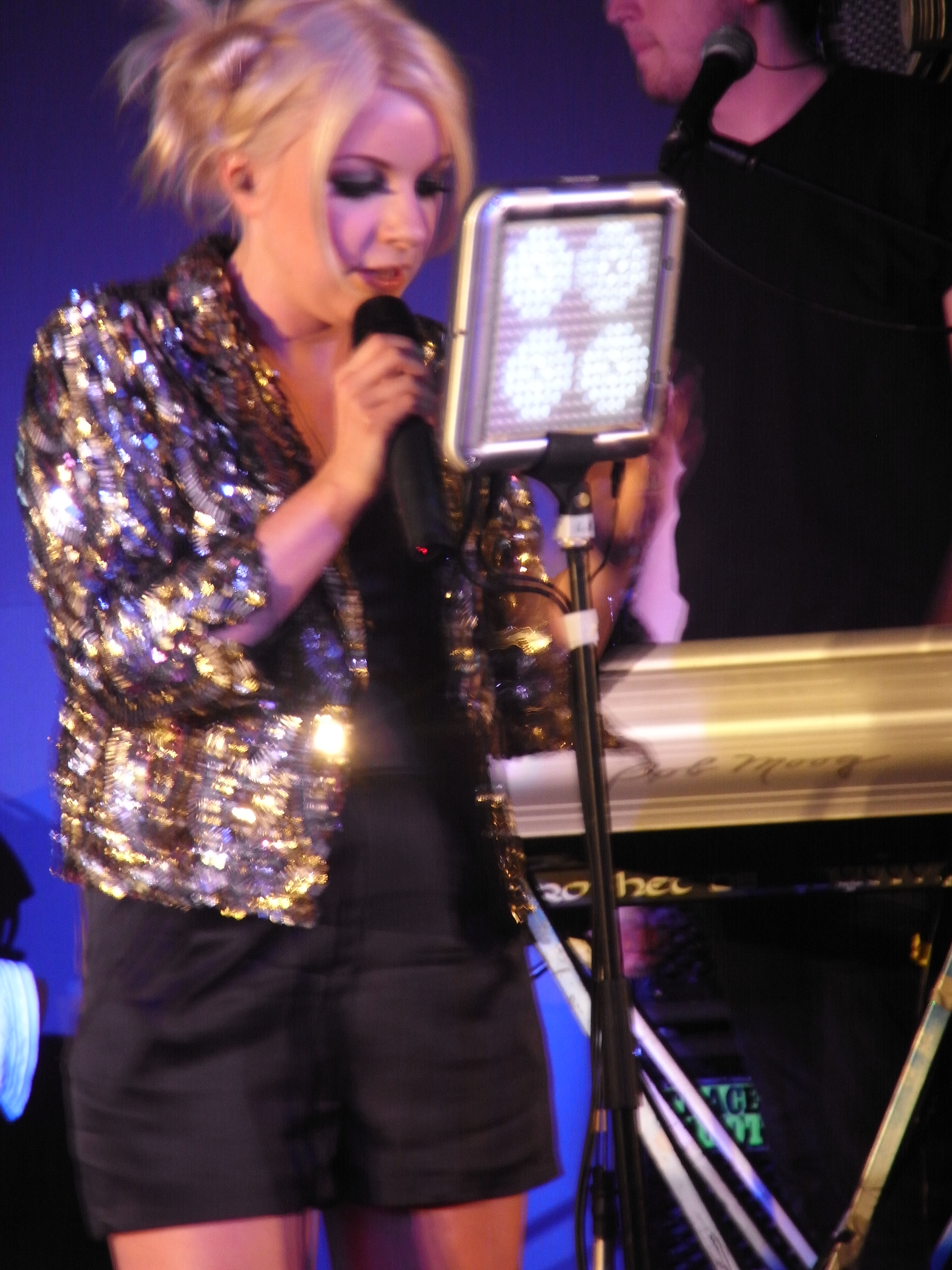
Little Boots using a Tenori-on

- English comedian Bill Bailey occasionally uses this instrument in his live performances including his 2009-2010 world tour; it is featured in Dandelion Mind.
- Little Boots is known for using a Tenori-On for live performances, and it has featured in the videos she has released on YouTube.
- Björk has used a Tenori-on in her live performance of the song Who Is It on Voltaic tour.
- Jon Hume from New Zealand band Evermore has a Tenori-On built into his silver Gibson guitar used on-stage during the Truth of The World and subsequent tours.
- Gotan Project on tour 2010/2011.
- London based Electronic musician Four Tet has stated that he has used the Tenori-on as part of his creative process
- Mexican electronic music act Nortec Collective Presents Bostich + Fussible
- Jonathan Coulton frequently uses a Tenori-On when performing his song My Monkey.
- Jean-Jacques Birgé has been using a Tenori-on live since Feb.2008, now playing simultaneously with two.
- Future Loop Foundation use Tenori-On as an inspiration tool to jam along to tracks by playing it through a sound card.
- Film composer, Hans Zimmer, used the Tenori-On during his performance at The Dark Knight premiere.
- Film composer, Luis Delgado, used the Tenori-On as an inspiration tool for the "Planetario de Madrid" music.
- During her May 2014 tour, Priscilla Ahn performed her song "In a Closet in the Middle of the Night" using the Tenori-On.
- Ariana Grande cites using and owning one when she was 14 while on the show Hot Ones.

In the 8th episode of the fourth series of the British coming-of-age television drama series Skins the character Pandora performs an original song she wrote to cheer her friend Effy up on her Tenori-On. Several years later in a look back video on his favorite Skins musical moments, series co-creator Jamie Brittain revealed the Tenori-On used in the show is actually his and he lent it to the production as producers did not want to spend money on buying one for that scene.

== TNR-i software ==
As of June 2011, Yamaha made Tenori-on also available as a software app for Apple iOS devices (iPhone, iPad, iPod).

In 2013, a second app TNR-e was released, with a changed sound set to suit the EDM style of music, and an additional effects section.

== See also ==
- Monome
- Reactable
- Electronic instruments
- List of music software
