= Rez (video game) =

2001 video game

- Box art used in Japan for the Dreamcast and PS2 releases
- Developer: United Game Artists (Note: Rez HD co-developed by Q Entertainment and HexaDrive; Rez Infinite co-developed by Enhance Games, Resonair and Monstars.)
- Publishers: Sega: Dreamcast Sega PlayStation 2; WW: Sega; EU: Sony Computer Entertainment HD Microsoft Game Studios Infinite Enhance Games
- Director: Jun Kobayashi
- Producer: Tetsuya Mizuguchi
- Designers: Hiroyuki Abe; Katsuhiko Yamada
- Programmer: Mitsuru Takahashi
- Artist: Katsumi Yokota
- Composer: Keiichi Sugiyama (Note: Sound director and designer, composer of opening stage track and additional music.)
- Engine: Unreal Engine 4 (Rez Infinite) (Note: Area X); Unreal Engine 5 (Rez Infinite PS5)
- Platforms: Dreamcast; PlayStation 2; Xbox 360; PlayStation 4; Windows; Android; Oculus Quest; PlayStation 5
- Release: November 22, 2001: Dreamcast; JP: November 22, 2001; EU: February 20, 2002 PlayStation 2; JP: November 22, 2001; NA: January 8, 2002; EU: February 20, 2002 Xbox 360 January 30, 2008 PlayStation 4 October 13, 2016 Windows August 9, 2017 Android November 20, 2017 Oculus Quest October 13, 2020 PlayStation 5 February 22, 2023
- Genres: Rail shooter, music
- Mode: Single-player

Rez (Note: Rezu (Japanese: レズ)) is a music rail shooter video game developed by United Game Artists and published by Sega for the Dreamcast and PlayStation 2. It was released in Japan in 2001, followed by releases to the United States and Europe in 2002. The game was ported to Xbox 360 as Rez HD by Q Entertainment and HexaDrive in 2008. A virtual reality-compatible expanded version dubbed Rez Infinite was co-developed and released through 2016 to 2023 by Enhance Games, Resonair and Monstars for PlayStation 4, Windows, Android, Oculus Quest and PlayStation 5.

Following a hacker's journey into a malfunctioning AI system, the game has players controlling their avatar as they shoot down numerous enemies. The gameplay and projectile hits sync with the music and have vibration feedback for different controllers, aiming to create a sense of synesthesia. The narrative is told using little description and no dialogue and includes thematic references to the journey of life and technological singularity.

The game was conceived by Tetsuya Mizuguchi during 1994 and 1995, drawing inspiration from European disco music. Production began in 1999 after United Game Artists finished work on Space Channel 5. The design concept drew from rave culture and classic rail shooters, and level design made extensive use of wire frame graphics inspired by the paintings of Wassily Kandinsky. The music, supervised by Keiichi Sugiyama, featured collaborations with multiple Japanese and European music artists and influenced level designs.

The game met with low sales, but strong critical reception due to its music, gameplay and graphics, though several reviewers faulted a lack of content. It also received several industry award nominations, and has been remembered as one of the Dreamcast's best titles. Rez HD and Rez Infinite have likewise met with praise from journalists. Rez Infinite in particular was hailed for its virtual reality integration and its additional Unreal Engine 4-powered zone Area X, described as the closest people might see to a true sequel. Mizuguchi eventually produced a spiritual successor to Rez at Q Entertainment titled Child of Eden.

== Gameplay ==
Rez in-game screenshot on the Sega Dreamcast

Rez is a video game that combines mechanics from the music game genre and rail shooters like Panzer Dragoon. Players take the role of a hacker infiltrating a malfunctioning artificial intelligence and fighting off viruses and corrupted security programs. Destroying data nodes in each level raises the "layer level" to a maximum number of 10. Raising a layer level changes the background music, layout, and enemies of a level. There are five levels, dubbed Areas, although at the start only four can be accessed.

The player character can assume six forms at different power levels, with a seventh unlocked for Area 5. The player starts the game by default at Level 01. Upon being damaged, the player devolves into a previous form. The lowest possible is Level 00, and if hit again in this state the game ends. The player raises their level using Progress Nodes, which appear after a certain number of enemies are destroyed. There are singular Progress Nodes and X3 Progress Nodes that fill three bars on the level meter. The player can also collect up to four Overdrive Nodes, which fill a meter and trigger automatic screen-clearing attacks.

During gameplay, the player runs through a level on rails and manually aims a lock-on missile launcher at up to eight targets. As the player shoots down enemies, the impact automatically syncs with the background track to create additional musical layers within each level. The shots can be fed back to the player through controller vibration feedback. Each Area ends in a boss fight. Bosses scale in difficulty depending on the number of enemies killed in the previous layers.

Progress through the game unlocks additional areas and modes including an enemy-free exploration mode, score attack, and boss rush. There is also a mode where all five areas are played back to back with raised difficulty. Each area's completion is scored by Analyzation (data nodes accessed), Shot Down (enemies destroyed) and Support Item (support nodes collected).

== Synopsis ==
The narrative of Rez is told without dialogue and using minimal description, relying on in-game visual storytelling. In the future, amid a rising population and an overflowing amount of information corrupting cyberspace, a new network dubbed "K Project" is created to manage the data. At the heart of K Project is an artificial intelligence called Eden. Overwhelmed by the ever-increasing flow of information, Eden begins doubting its purpose and existence, withdrawing into sleep at the heart of cyberspace when finally confronted with humanity's clashing nature and actions in the real world. The player, a hacker, dives into cyberspace and fights off viruses and infected firewalls to find and wake Eden. When they reach the final area, the hacker is confronted with questions about the meaning of life, then after a final battle succeeds in reconstituting and waking Eden.

== Production ==
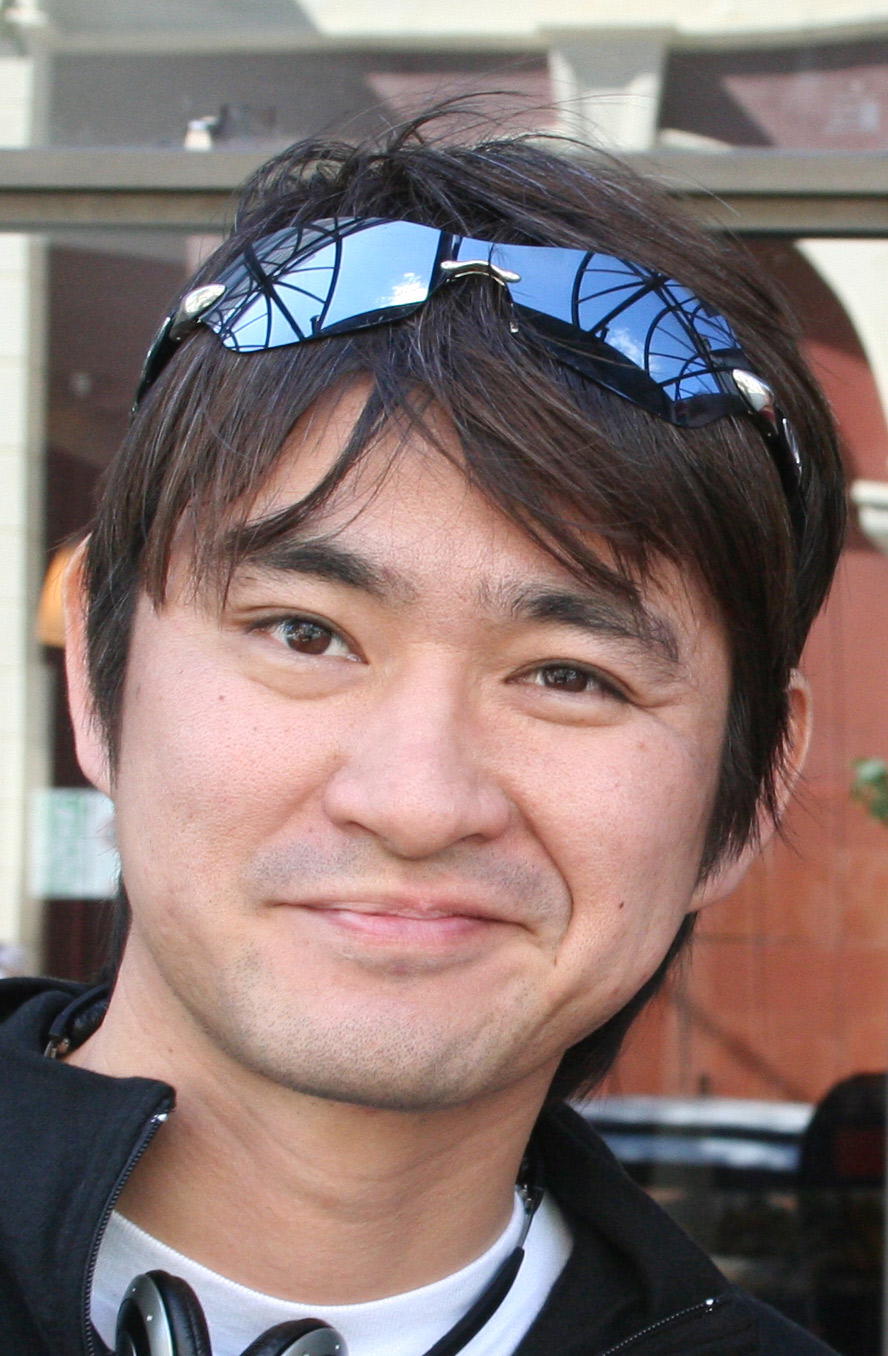
Tetsuya Mizuguchi in 2007

Rez was developed by United Game Artists, an internal studio of Sega led by Tetsuya Mizuguchi, who was then known for his work on racing games. The original concept for Rez originated between 1994 and 1995. During research work in Europe on Sega Rally Championship 2, Mizuguchi and a few friends attended the open-air music event Street Parade. Seeing people swaying en masse to the music, he decided that this was the type of game he wished to make. At this time, the technology was inadequate for realising his vision. In 1998, Mizuguchi was approached about forming a dedicated team to work on new innovative titles for Sega's new Dreamcast console; his first project along these lines was Space Channel 5, and during its production he made plans for Rez. He built up his new team at what would become United Game Artists. As with Space Channel 5, Mizuguchi wanted to draw in casual gamers from across demographics, along with people who would normally not play games. He had great difficulty pitching the game to Sega, as he found it difficult to explain what Rez was until they played the prototype.

Production proper began in 1999 following the completion of Space Channel 5. A large portion of the staff were drawn from Team Andromeda, creators of Panzer Dragoon. Pre-production lasted a year, and due to the variety of staff on the project there were several strife-filled periods and disagreements between groups within the team. The game went through different working titles including "The Sound Project", "Project Eden", "K-Project" and "Vibes". There were early plans to title the final game "K-Project" or "K". Once "Rez" was suggested, Mizuguchi felt it was a name which would be both memorable and have international appeal. The final title was meant to be a contraction of "Resolve", but during a studio visit from Edge Magazine staff, he was inspired to connect it to the concept of "de-rezzing" from the 1982 movie Tron. A different source is given by director Jun Kobayashi, who stated the title came from the word "resolute".

Searching for people who could help realise his vision, Mizuguchi met up with and employed a group of VJs dubbed "Mommy's Endorphin Machine", with Kobayashi being a member. He had difficulty explaining the concept to staff members before the first programming prototypes were created. Production of the game began on Dreamcast, but during development a version was put into motion for the PlayStation 2 (PS2) which would release simultaneously with the Dreamcast version. This was due to the commercial failure of the Dreamcast and Sega's move to third-party software production. The team's morale was severely affected by the change to a multiplatform release. Rez was the first Sega-produced game released on the PS2, and one of Sega's last first-party titles for the Dreamcast. The production was described by multiple staff members as hard but rewarding. According to technical officer Ryuichi Hattori, a lot of problems stemmed from it being the team's first PS2 title.

=== Game design ===
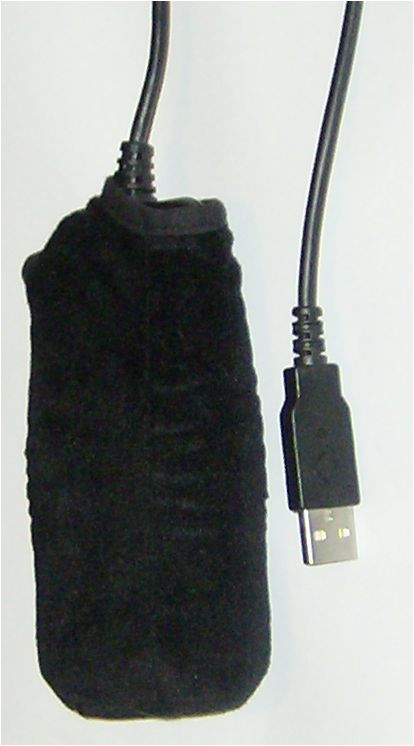
Trance Vibrator in protective pouch. The controller was developed by United Game Artists for Rez to increase the player's sensory immersion.

The first concept for the gameplay of Rez was that when the player shot something down, it would create a sound in sync with the background music, coupled with a vibration through the controller. Mizuguchi wanted the game to be a "full body" experience, paying homage to arcade titles he had worked on early in his career at Sega including Sega Rally. The overall design drew from several different sources of inspiration, including rave culture as exemplified in events such as Street Parade, and a video from Africa he saw online where a man started clapping and people either swayed and stamped to the beat or joined in. Figuring that the capacity for music and sights to draw in a crowd would be the essential element to his envisioned game, Mizuguchi began exploring how to programmatically recreate this effect. Much of Mizuguchi's time during development was listening to music to inspire his designs.

Mizuguchi particularly wanted to create a non-violent shooter appealing to many people. A key element was allowing for mistakes and fluffs from the player—penalised in other titles within the genre—to be incorporated into the score of Rez. The musical gameplay was developed following a call and response approach (the audience responds to something from a singer or performer), similar to that of what a disc jockey would do to get reaction from the crowd. In parallel with the development of the game's narrative and aesthetic, the team developed its mechanic of quantizing the notes, so that regardless of the player's imprecision that they would play out on the beat, which they "felt like magic" to players of any skill level. The decision to use a rail shooter template for gameplay originated from the number of staff who were veterans of both Sega Rally and the Panzer Dragoon series.

The game's software was developed entirely from scratch, causing issues for the team, particularly due to the PS2 release. The game went through several prototypes, with different variations on the theme of a musical rail shooter. Its earliest concepts were described by artist Jake Kazdel as "wild", with creations ranging from character action inspired by Space Harrier to abstract characters and enemies designed like musical props. These early stages were difficult for anyone to understand, and eventually it settled down into having a more traditional player character and enemies. The first working prototype featured a figure running through a cyberspace environment, while a later build used a fighter jet. Although designed to emphasize music, Mizuguchi has stated that he did not intend the game to be considered a music or rhythm game. The idea that musical skill would be a prerequisite for full appreciation of the game was something that both Mizuguchi and Kobayashi were anxious to avoid. Instead, the team adopted a quantization mechanic for the gameplay that allowed even players without natural rhythm to interact musically with the game through a process of "locking on" to enemies. This mechanic formed a core theme along which the gameplay developed.

The vibration feedback made use of the Dreamcast vibration pack, the DualShock 2 controller for PS2, and a custom controller created by Mizuguchi's team for the game dubbed the Trance Vibrator that could be used with the PS2 version. The Trance Vibrator was Mizuguchi's idea, starting as a joke to enhance the visual mechanics of the game. The concept was born alongside the original plan for Rez when Mizuguchi visited Europe. While the standard controllers gave good vibration feedback, it only fed into the hands. Mizuguchi's aim with the Trance Vibrator was to allow a player to place it somewhere else in contact with their skin and feel the vibrations from there. He admitted that this lent itself to situations where it could be used for sexual stimulation.

=== Art design and scenario ===
The game's art director and lead artist was Katsumi Yokota, noted for his work on Panzer Dragoon Saga. Kazdel, who worked on Space Channel 5, was on board as a character artist and graphics co-designer with Ryutaro Sugiyama. One of the game's earliest visual inspirations was the work of Wassily Kandinsky, a 19th-century artist whose abstract work made a profound impression on Mizuguchi and his work. The original name "Project K" was a homage to Kandinsky, and Mizuguchi dedicated the game to him. The early plans had levels directly inspired by Kandinsky's artwork, but Mizuguchi decided against this. Other early versions drew direct inspiration from hip hop culture and the evolutionary history of life. One of the principle inspirations was Kandinsky's theories on synesthesia, sensations created by the combination of different sensory inputs that had already inspired Mizuguchi's work on Space Channel 5.

A major decision for the team was using wire frame graphics for everything from character models to environments, paying homage to early video game graphics such as were seen in the 1983 Star Wars game and Missile Command. The decision to use this style was described by Yokota as "quite interesting", as his work on Panzer Dragoon had been aiming for the highest realism possible. The graphics mirroring the music drew direct stylistic inspiration from the Winamp media player display. All but Area 5 were created using the same methodology; the wire frame was in the level foreground, while any particle effects and other visual elements were placed in the background area. This was the only feasible way to synchronise the music and visuals. The first four levels had different visual themes and two key colors each. The first area drew from Ancient Egypt and used red and orange, the second used Indian culture with blue and purple, the third used Mesopotamian designs and the colors green and cyan, while the fourth area drew from Chinese culture and had a yellow and green color design. Each stage boss had a name taken from one of the planets. The final area had a design influenced by the natural world. Kazdel described this last area as Yokota's "personal trip out level".

Mizuguchi's first ideas for the game's plot, which is delivered through "sensory" means rather than being driven by text and narration, was to form a connection between life and music. While presented as a cyberpunk plot, Mizuguchi envisioned the narrative as a metaphor for the journey of life. Mizuguchi has suggested that the questions during the game's climax are intended to provoke the realization that the player is "not a hacker but a sperm", that Rez is a story of conception set against the backdrop of an emergent AI. The awakening of Eden at the game's end is a reference to the theoretical technological singularity. According to Kobayashi, their journey to awake Eden allows the hacker experience elevation to a higher existence within cyberspace, achieving something similar to enlightenment. This was visually referenced through the various forms the hacker can take as they raise their level. To achieve this fusion of themes with the visuals and score, Mizugushi worked with Yokota and team musician Nobuhiko Tanuma so the art design and musical progression would illustrate these themes. The narrative poem shown during Area 5 was written by Yokota. The English text was written by Kazdel.

=== Music ===
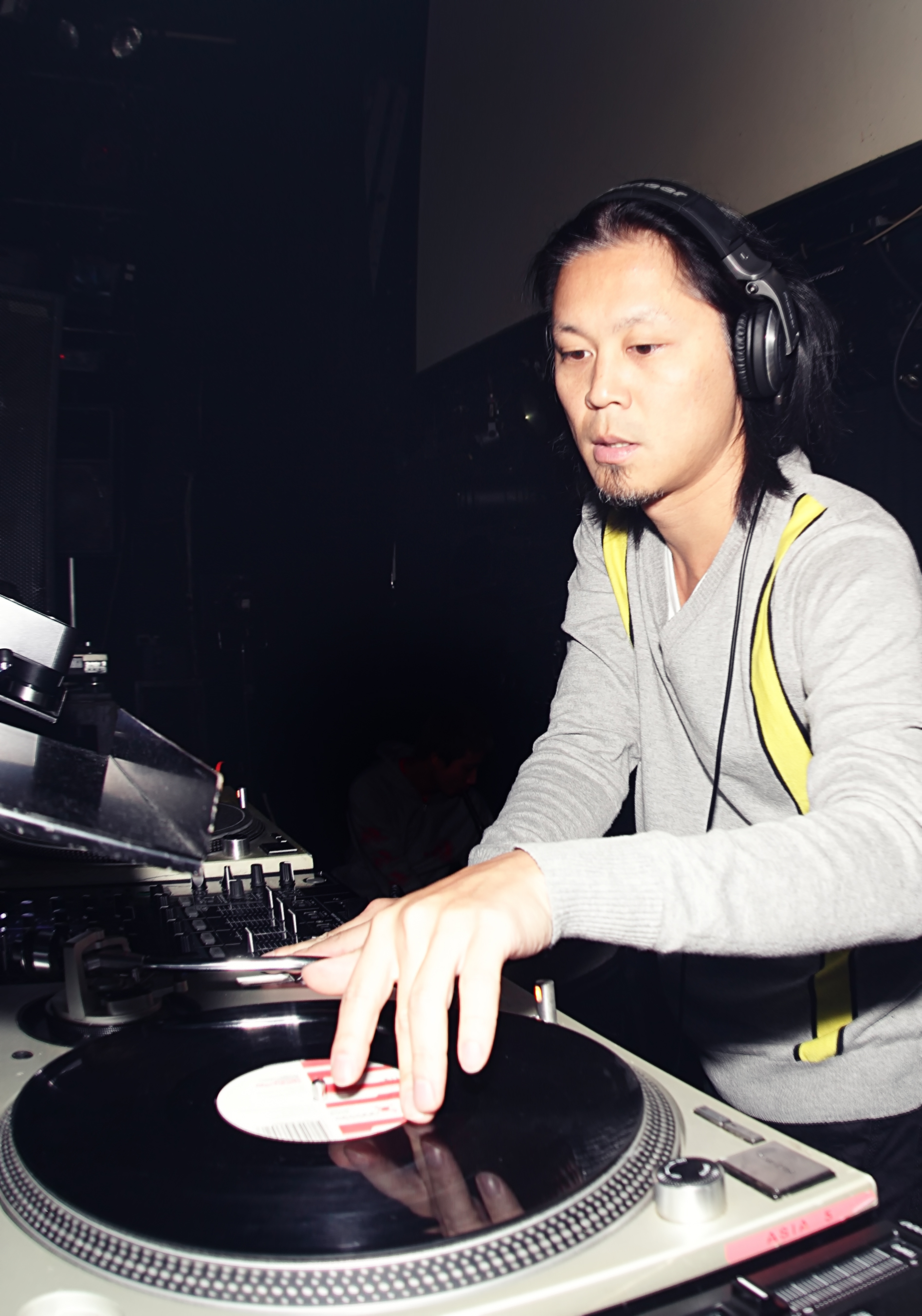
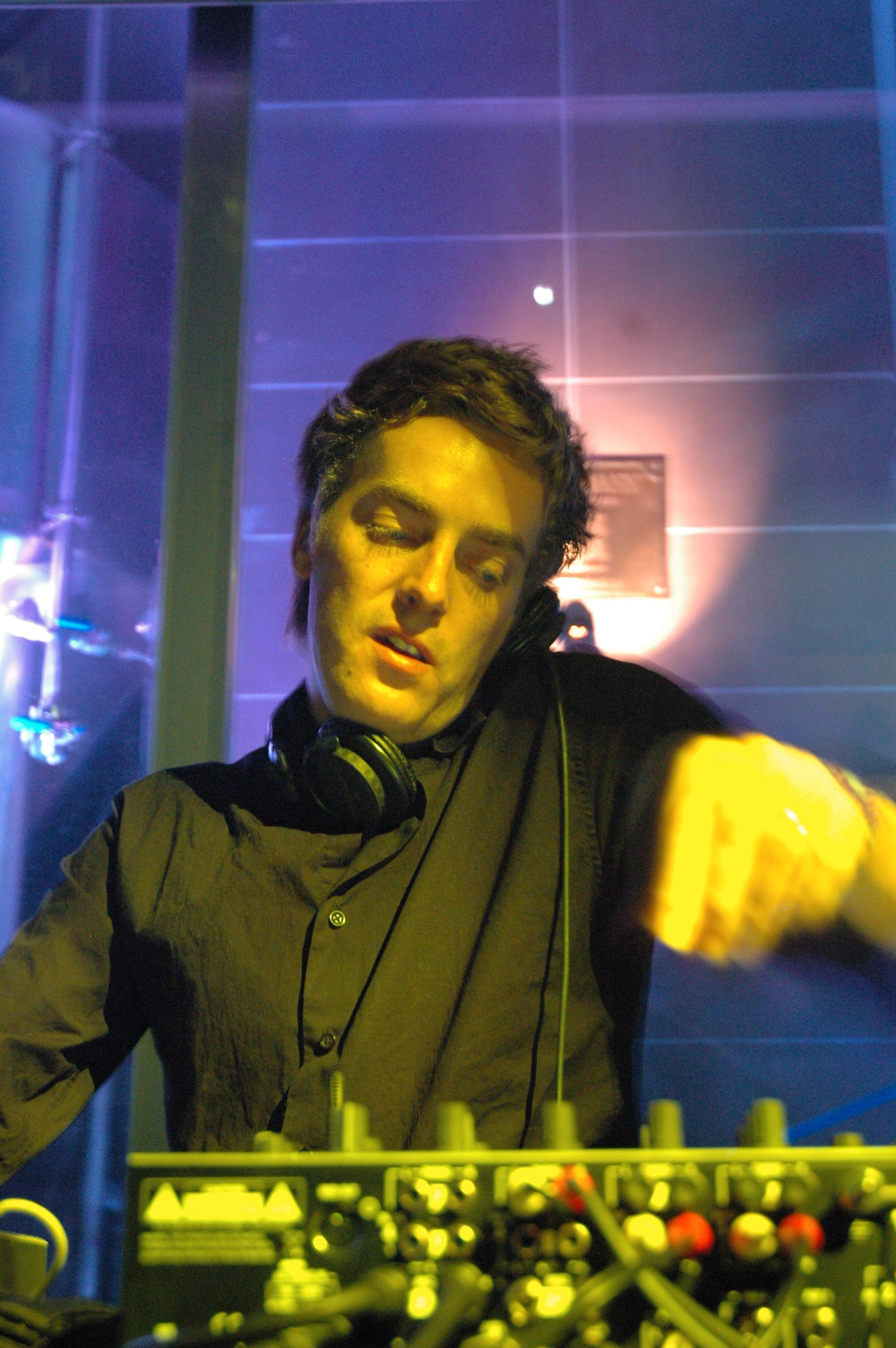
The music for Rez featured collaborations with electronic music artists from Japan and Europe, including Ken Ishii (left) and Adam Freeland (right).

For the musical style, Mizuguchi decided on using electronic dance music, emulating the music he had experienced during his time in Europe. The sound design and some of the music was handled by Keiichi Sugiyama, a member of Sega's WaveMaster label. The music score was coordinated by Masakazu Hiroishi. It drew inspiration from the soundtracks of Xenon 2 Megablast (1989) and Xevious (1983), along with Haruomi Hosono's 1984 Super Xevious remix single. Mizugushi and Yokota began investigating different musical genres that would evoke emotional and psychological responses appropriate to produce the primal and synaesthetic experience Rez was intended to provide. After hours of investigation, they concluded that due to its digital simplicity which allowed a designer to isolate a single note and to alter the timing of the overall rhythm, the techno genre offered the greatest promise for producing the desired effects. Music coordination was done by a DJ called Ebizoo, who helped incorporate the call and response methods into the in-game score. The project went through an intensive period of matching music to visuals requiring multiple iterations of back-and-forth alterations in which both music (sometimes from the first note) and art (including entire bosses) were significantly modified.

During early production, Ebizoo used placeholder tracks by Fatboy Slim and Underworld for test levels. Hiroishi contacted multiple composers to contribute tracks for each zone, including Ken Ishii and Joujouka as well as English artists Coldcut and Adam Freeland. These people both contributed original tracks and licensed remixes of existing numbers for the game. The team also reached out to Underworld, Fatboy Slim, The Chemical Brothers and Aphex Twin, but failed to reach an agreement about using their tracks. In the case of Underworld, the team wanted to use their track "Rez" for the opening area, as they had been doing during prototyping. Underworld declined as they did not wish to be associated with any kind of video game violence as the game involved "shooting things". This led to Sugiyama creating the opening stage track. The game also included two tracks from Oval, and a track from Ebizoo. The final boss theme was composed by Coldcut and Tim Bran.

Mizuguchi had a university friend with Joujouka's Tsuyoshi Suzuki, and the two had long wanted to collaborate on a project. The track used, "Rock is Sponge", was one of a group Joujouka was creating for an album release. Mizuguchi listened to the early versions of tracks, picking "Rock is Sponge" as most suitable. For Ishii's contribution, Sega asked for five or six variations within the track, which was around five minutes long. Ishii found this challenging, but satisfying. Mizuguchi personally approached Coldcut about using their music. They immediately understood what he was trying to do, and rather than licensing their track "Timber" as originally requested, they composed an original track for the game. Freeland also created his track "Fear" as an original piece, inspired by Mizuguchi's description of the game as being inspired by the artwork of Kandinsky. "Fear" contained the lyric "Fear is the Mind Killer", taken from the novel Dune by Frank Herbert. This was intended as being inspirational, and emblematic of life's struggle. "Fear" was also slower-paced than the other tracks, fitting in with the area's themes and feel.

For the album release, the team asked each composer to create a new remix that was the "highest" form of the track that had been mixed and synced to gameplay. The soundtrack album, titled Rez / Gamer's Guide to..., was co-published in collaboration with United Game Artists by Musicmine, an imprint of Universal, and independent record company Third Ear. It included ten tracks from across the game, including secret areas. The soundtrack was released January 23, 2002. Third Ear also released two vinyl LPs. The Rez soundtracks were Third Ear's first major commercial release, with one of its founders using contacts within Sega to get the publishing contract.

Tracklist
No.	Title	Writer(s)	Length
1.	"Buggie Running Beeps01"	Keiichi Sugiyama	5:50
2.	"Protocol rain"	mist	7:08
3.	"Creation The State of Art"	Ken Ishii	6:34
4.	"Rock Is Sponge"	Joujouka	7:31
5.	"Fear (Rez Mix)"	Adam Freeland	5:07
6.	"Boss Attacks (Remix)"	Coldcut & Tim Bran	7:15
7.	"F6 G5"	Ebizoo	7:48
8.	"Octaeder 01"	Oval	3:50
9.	"Creative State"	Ken Ishii	6:21
10.	"P-project"	Oval	5:39

== Release ==
The game was first announced at E3 2001 under its working title "K-Project". It was shown off by both Sega and Sony for their respective consoles. The game was announced under its official title the following month at the Shibuya-AX Sony PlayStation 2 party. Concerned about the upheavals at Sega, and feeling a lack of support for Rez, Mizuguchi was anxious to make an impression with his presentation of the game. To achieve this he bleached and dyed his hair pure white and made his presentation—a solo demonstration of himself playing the game live—without saying a word after taking the stage. Mizuguchi's intention was for the game to primarily speak for itself, and the reaction he received from both Sega and Sony executives was exactly what he had hoped for. In wrapping up the party, Sony Computer Entertainment chairman and former Sony Music president Shigeo Maruyama took the stage and gave specific praise for Rez, suggesting that it would "not only make, but change history for music in games". Working together, marketing teams from both Sega and Sony developed innovative strategies to market the game including co-promoting it with electronic music festivals. For the launch party in Akasaka, Tokyo, Mizuguchi previewed music from the game alongside Freeland, Joujouka, and Coldcut via a livestream.

Sega acted as publisher for the Dreamcast version worldwide and the PS2 version in Japan and North America. The game was released in Japan for both PS2 and Dreamcast on November 22, 2001. A special "Absolute Set" edition, limited to 500 units, was sold exclusively through the Tsutaya store chain. The edition included a copy of the game and the Trance Vibrator, and themed merchandise including a T-shirt, headphones and eyedrops. Further goods along those same lines were sold at special events in the months following the game's release. The Japanese versions also included a Morolian alien from Space Channel 5 as a secret playable character if players had save data from Space Channel 5. While the Dreamcast version was localised into English for a European release, it went unreleased in North America. The PS2 version was marketed and published in Europe as part of Sony's deal with Sega to distribute multiple titles in the region. The game released on January 8, 2002, in North America, and February 20 in Europe. The Trance Vibrator was offered for a limited time through Sega's American online store.

=== Rez HD ===
A high-definition remaster for Xbox 360, titled Rez HD, was developed by Mizuguchi's studio Q Entertainment and HexaDrive. The game was released through Xbox Live Arcade on January 30, 2008. It was published by Microsoft Game Studios. Mizuguchi wanted to release an improved version of Rez on modern consoles, and so acquired the rights from Sega. Mizuguchi described Rez HD as a "pure port" that was as close as possible to what he initially envisioned for the game. Production took between seven and eight months. Both Mizuguchi and Yokota were involved in the project. He chose the 360 due to its graphics and 5.1 surround sound capacity. The download service also allowed him to distribute the game at a low price to the widest possible audience. Rez HD was HexaDrive's first job as a company. They were able to complete the project quickly due to their in-depth knowledge of then-current consoles. The team consisted of around ten people; three came from HexaDrive, and seven or eight from Q Entertainment. For the conversion, the team adjusted the aspect ratio, and raised the framerate from 30 to 60 per second.

=== Rez Infinite ===
Area X, a zone exclusive to Rez Infinite powered by Unreal Engine 4

Rez Infinite is an expanded release of Rez, first announced in December 2015 for PlayStation 4 (PS4). While packaged with the original version, it also shipped with a new level called Area X, and both modes were made compatible with virtual reality (VR) devices. For the PS4, this was achieved using the PlayStation VR. The biggest addition to the game for Infinite was "Area X", which was built from scratch using Unreal Engine 4 and unlocked after playing the original for one hour. In contrast to the on-rails gameplay of Rez, "Area X" allows the player to roam freely around the cyberspace environment.

Mizuguchi wanted to attract both fans of the original game and newcomers who had not heard of or played Rez. Alongside porting the game to new platforms, the team wanted to create something new. He led development under two small studio entities he founded; Enhance Games which oversaw and publicised the project, and the group Resonair. Over an eighteen-month period, Enhance and Resonair created the basics of the project before bringing in external studio Monstars to "color between the lines". Mizuguchi used this approach to avoid issues he had faced at Q Entertainment, which he left some years prior due to dissatisfaction with the company. He opted to return to gaming after seeing the potential for VR, creating Enhance Games to redevelop Rez for VR platforms. The team received additional marketing support from 8-4. The entire production lasted two years. The game's subtitle "Infinite" symbolised Mizuguchi's wish for both present and future players to enjoy the game.

Area X was born from Enhance Games wanting to strip Rez down to its basics and rebuild it using modern technology. Mizuguchi decided on two points; first to have particles generated from impacts so players could see a visualisation of the sounds and music, and second that players could roam freely. He compared the desired experience of Area X to "flying like Peter Pan". This provided a substantial challenge, as they needed to sync impact notes with the score without the rail shooter gameplay providing a constant speed. Area X made extensive use of particle-based rendering in its graphics, with light particles making up everything in the level. Its visual design supplied by Takashi Ishihara at the request of Mizuguchi and designer Osamu Kodera. Enemy AI within Area X was improved and Mizuguchi composed a new poem on the theme of birth to act as a coda to Yokota's original poem. The music for "Area X" was composed by Hydelic, a musical group which formed part of Resonair.

The PS4 version released on October 13, 2016. It was later updated to support the PlayStation 4 Pro model. A notable piece of merchandise was a four-disc vinyl release of the game's soundtrack, which included both the original album tracks and the piece used in Area X. The release, co-created by Iam8bit, also featured a large book detailing the making of both Rez and Rez Infinite, with extensive interviews with Mizuguchi and other staff members. The soundtrack later saw release on CD and digitally. A version for Microsoft Windows was released on August 9, 2017. This version was compatible with the HTC Vive and Oculus Rift. Mizuguchi planned for a Windows version from an early stage, beginning development using Windows before bringing it over into the PS4 environment. He reasoned that while consoles have a finite life, games have far longer lifespans through a digital Windows release. It was also ported to Android on November 20, requiring use of the Google Daydream peripheral. It was also a launch title for a new model of the Oculus Quest VR headset, releasing on October 13, 2020. It was one of the titles available through the Amazon Luna cloud platform during its beta release on October 20, 2020. A port to PlayStation 5, with compatibility with the PlayStation VR2, which features an upgraded version of Area X using Unreal Engine 5 to take advantage of its features, was released on February 22, 2023. Owners of the PS4 version were offered an upgrade to the PS5 version at a discounted price.

== Reception ==
Reception

Aggregate score
Aggregator	Score				
Aggregator	Dreamcast	PC	PS2	PS4	Xbox 360
Metacritic	N/A	89/100	78/100	89/100	89/100

Review scores
Publication	Score				
Publication	Dreamcast	PC	PS2	PS4	Xbox 360
1Up.com	N/A	N/A	N/A	N/A	A+
Destructoid	N/A	N/A	N/A	9.5/10	N/A
Edge	9/10	N/A	9/10	9/10	N/A
Eurogamer	8/10	N/A	N/A	Essential	10/10
Famitsu	31/40	N/A	32/40	N/A	N/A
GameSpot	N/A	9/10	7.9/10	9/10	8.5/10
IGN	N/A	N/A	8.5	8.2/10	8.6/10
PC Gamer (UK)	N/A	88/100	N/A	N/A	N/A
ODCM (UK)	82%	N/A	N/A	N/A	N/A
PSM2	N/A	N/A	66/100	N/A	N/A

=== Original release ===
Sega originally shipped Rez in fairly small quantities. In Japan, the PS2 version sold just under 37,600 units. By 2003, the PlayStation 2 version had sold over 100,000 copies in North America. Although generally low, North American sales were worse than in Japan, though Mizuguchi held out hope for European sales. On the whole, Rez was classified as a commercial failure worldwide, blamed alternately on poor marketing support from Sega, and its non-standard gameplay and art style.

Japanese gaming magazine Famitsu reviewed both versions of the game in the same issue. In their PS2 version review, Famitsu praised its combination of rail shooter and music genre mechanics while also praising the visual design. The Dreamcast version was given one point less than the PS2 version, with a reviewer citing the added gameplay immersion from the Trance Vibrator as the reason for the PS2 version's higher score.

Edge reviewed both versions, preferring the PS2 version due to experiencing slowdown on the Dreamcast release, but lauding both for their visual design and blend of absorbing musical and visual elements. Eurogamer's Martin Taylor noted a lack of gameplay content failing to justify a full price purchase, but gave full praise to the visual and music, feeling the game was a well-designed throwback to arcade games from the early days of the medium. Sam Jones of Official Dreamcast Magazine UK lauded the visual design and music, but felt a lack of challenge and noted that Sega should develop a sequel to smooth out some of the game's issues. A second opinion from Martin Mathers cited the game as an "essential purchase" and good swansong for the Dreamcast.

IGN's David Smith lauded the graphics and found the narrative engaging, and enjoyed the music despite comments that players needed to like the style; he sadly noted that its blend of styles would limit its audience. Jeff Gerstmann, writing for GameSpot, said that Rez was strongest in its presentation and music, with the gameplay feeling basic compared to other rail shooters, closing by referring to the game as "decidedly different than other games on the market". Duncan Baizley of PSM2 was less positive, recognising its niche appeal but finding it lacking as a game for mainstream players; the environments and concept met with praise, but he faulted the music and found the gameplay difficult due to the graphic style. Writing for Games in 2002, reviewer Thomas L. McDonald described Rez as a game that "carves out its own niche" as an abstract shooter, both emphasising its differences from traditional rhythm games and its laudable result.

=== Later releases ===
Giving Rez HD a perfect score, Sam Kennedy of 1Up.com felt that the release proved the original was ahead of its time, saying its stylised graphics had hardly aged and that the graphical and audio updates showed off the game as its best. GameSpot's Don Francis, despite finding the music monotonous after a while, lauded the technical improvements made and how well the original graphics and gameplay had aged. Erik Brudvig of IGN praised the upgrade to the game, citing it as unique among the Xbox Live library and worth trying for any gamer, while admitting its niche appeal and lack of new content. Simon Parkin, writing for Eurogamer, also gave the port a perfect score and noted that modern gamers would be more appreciative of the title than those when it first released.

Both the PS4 and PC versions of Rez Infinite received "generally favourable" reviews, earning scores of 89 points out of 100 on review aggregate Metacritic. Martin Robinson of Eurogamer called the game a "modern masterpiece", and GameSpot's Alexa Ray Corriea gave it general praise, citing it as a modern classic despite a lack of content. Chris Carter of Destructoid praised the game's unique nature, and IGN's Vince Ingenito called it the most complete version of Rez with or without the VR functions. Lucas Sullivan, writing for GamesRadar, lauded the additions and gameplay despite a lack of content and online elements. Edge called it the best VR-based title of 2016, and Phil Savage of PC Gamer lauded the range of graphics option alongside the aesthetic upgrades and new content. The VR mode and Area X were universally lauded, with the latter being praised for both its music and graphics. Both Sullivan and Corriea felt that the game had achieved its full potential with Rez Infinite.

=== Accolades and retrospectives ===
Rez received an award from The Agency for Cultural Affairs Media Art Festival in Japan. At the 2002 NAVGTR awards, Rez was nominated in the "Outstanding Innovation in Game Play" category, and was nominated for "Console Action/Adventure Game of the Year" at the 6th Annual Interactive Achievement Awards. At the second Game Developers Choice Awards in 2001, the game was one of five titles highlighted in the "Game Innovation Spotlights" category, and was one of four games nominated for the 2001 BAFTA Interactive Entertainment Awards in their "Interactive Arts" category. It also won GameSpot's 2002 "Best Graphics (Artistic) on PlayStation 2" award, and was nominated in the "Best Game No One Played on PlayStation 2" category.

In anniversary retrospectives and lists of memorable Dreamcast titles from multiple websites including Gamasutra and IGN, Rez was noted for its visual design and blend of gameplay and music. As part of a feature on Mizuguchi's career and work, James Mielke of 1Up.com considered Rez underrated in its time and having aged well compared to its contemporaries. The game would go on to receive "Runner Up" in the category of "Electronic - Puzzle and Classic" in Games's annual "The Games 100". In 2009, Edge ranked the game #49 on its list of "The 100 Best Games To Play Today", calling it "Astonishing to watch [and] uniquely absorbing to play". In 2012, Rez was listed on Time's list for the 100 greatest video games of all time. Rez was chosen as one of the Dreamcast games to be shown at the Smithsonian American Art Museum's 2012 exhibition, The Art of Video Games. Rez HD was rated the 13th best Xbox Live Arcade of all time by IGN in a September 2010 listing. In 2023, a poll by GQ conducted among a team of video game journalists across the industry ranked Rez the 99th best video game of all time.

At The Game Awards 2016, Rez Infinite was nominated for "Best Music/Sound Design" and won "Best VR Game". It was also nominated for the equivalent "Best VR/AR Game" award at the 2016 Game Developers Choice Awards. At the 2017 British Academy Games Awards, the game was nominated in the "Audio Achievement" category.

== Legacy ==
Despite low sales, a sequel to Rez was being planned at Sega prior to its internal restructuring. Mizuguchi has continued to expand upon his game designs, aiming to bring in casual players and have them experience synesthesia as he wanted to do with Rez. The Ubisoft-published Child of Eden is a spiritual successor to Rez, designed around the same gameplay and sensory principles. Mizuguchi envisioned Rez as being the first in a trilogy of similar titles. According to a 2017 interview, Area X was seen by him partly as a prototype for the conceptual third title.
