= Music video game =

Video game genre

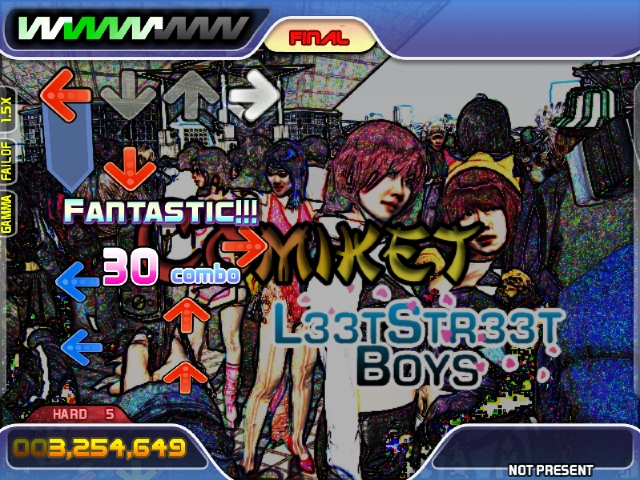
Open source music video game StepMania

A music video game, also commonly known as a music game, is a video game where the gameplay is meaningfully and often almost entirely oriented around the player's interactions with a musical score or individual songs. Music video games may take a variety of forms and are often grouped with puzzle games due to their common use of "rhythmically generated puzzles".

Music video games are distinct from purely audio games (e.g. the 1997 Sega Saturn release Real Sound: Kaze no Regret) in that they feature a visual feedback, to lead the player through the game's soundtrack, although eidetic music games can fall under both categories.

== Overview ==
Music video games are games where there is typically some type of interactivity of the gameplay with the game's music. This may be where the music is generated in response to the player's actions, or where the player reacts to the beats and notes of the music. As the genre has gained popularity and expanded, music video games have demonstrated the ability to support a range of various styles of gameplay, making the genre itself rather diffuse. A game such as Rayman Legends features levels that are based on endless runners but where the player scores better by matching their actions to the musical cues, which could make this a music video game.

Instead, it is easier to consider the sub-genres of music video games based on how the player interacts with the music in the game, of which there are four main types as described by the concepts of "matching, making, mixing, and metonymy" as described by Michael Austin, the director of the School of Music at Louisiana Tech University. These ideas correlate to the subgenres as described below. Music games may feature multiple modes; for example, Frequency is primarily a scored rhythm matching game but also includes a music mixing gameplay feature for players to make their own mixes of the available songs.

=== Rhythm-matching games ===
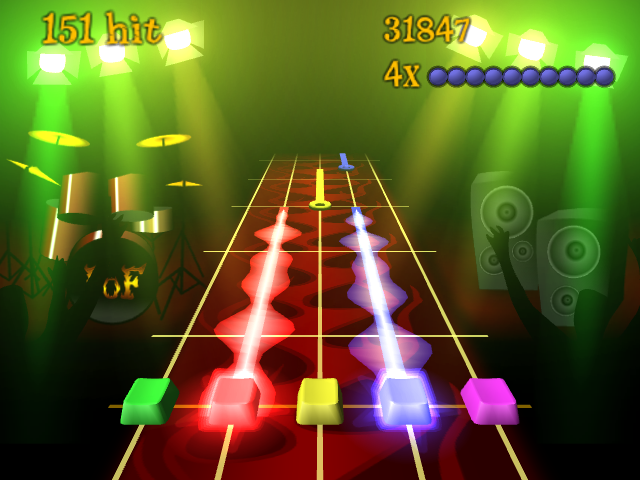
Frets on Fire, an open-source Guitar Hero clone, is an example of a rhythm-matching game.

Rhythm-matching games or simply rhythm games require the player to respond in some fashion in time to music as it is played and shown via the game, all generally to emphasize the rhythm of the song being played. This may be by performing specific actions on a controller with precision timing as the note is played. Players are generally scored by not only hitting the right control but how precisely they hit it in time with the music. To improve in such games, players often begin to learn the required actions to memory as to be able to anticipate difficult sections or areas where high scoring is possible.

The wide variety of possible player input has created a range of rhythm games, from Dance Dance Revolution where players input moves on a dance mat, Donkey Konga in which players beat on a conga drum-like controller, and the Guitar Hero series where players simulate the fingering and strumming on a guitar-shaped controller. This concept also extends to singing games like Karaoke Revolution, with players scored for how well they match the pitch of the vocal track.

Rhythm games are the most dominant form of the music game genre. The electronic game Simon is considered the earliest example of a rhythm game, while early games that defined the rhythm-matching aspects include Dance Aerobics (1987) and PaRappa the Rapper (1996). More recent titles include the Guitar Hero (2005) and Rock Band (2007), Rhythm Heaven Fever (2011), Beat Saber (2019), and Friday Night Funkin'.

==== Hybrid rhythm games ====
A further class of rhythm games is hybrid rhythm games or music reactive games. In comparison to the forementioned rhythm games where the rhythm matching is the primary focus and the player's action helps to generate the music that they hear, reactive games let the background music guide the player action, leaving the rhythm gameplay elements secondary to the main gameplay form. Often in these hybrid rhythm games, the player plays the game as they normally would but can use the in-game music to time actions often to better their score, thus affecting the interaction between the player and the in-game dynamics as goal of the game. In Rez, for example, the game takes the form of a simple rail shooter; however, by integrating sound effects created by the actions of the player (as he completes the normal tasks of rail-shooting) with the soundtrack as a whole, the game is intended to permit the player's direct interaction with the soundtrack and to encourage the creation of a synaesthetic experience. Other similar games include Pteranodon, Rhyme Rider Kerorican, or iS – internal section. A further class of these games allow for users to provide music that is then processed dynamically by the game to create challenges for that song, so that players are not dependent on the game's developer to extend the game's library of songs. Such games include Vib-Ribbon, Audiosurf, Dance Factory, or Dance Fabulous.

=== Music-making games ===
Music-making freeform music games are those in which the creation of music takes predominance over gameplay and as such these games are often more similar to non-game music synthesizers such as the Tenori-on. Players are given the ability to create their own music from a variety of sounds, instruments or voices, typically with no goal or objective. Free form music games occupy a position somewhere between generative hybrid music games and non-game utilities dependent upon the degree to which their gameplay relies upon a driving underlying plotline. This form of music game is closely analogous to sandbox games in the realm of non-musical games and the term "sandbox" has been used to describe this form of gameplay. Examples of such games include SimTunes or the music composition tool in Mario Paint.

=== Music-mixing games ===
Music-mixing games are those in which players take premade sounds, music, or other audio tracks and interact with them in the game to create new works. These games are similarly sandbox in nature a music-making games, though by creation of certain combination of sounds, the player may be awarded points or unlock additional features. Such games include Incredibox and Fuser.

=== Music education games ===
Music education video games are interactive titles designed primarily to teach musical skills like rhythm, melody, harmony, or instrument technique through structured, feedback-based gameplay. These titles aim for measurable learning outcomes. Popular educational games for music include Synthesia, Yousician, Rocksmith and Simply Piano.

=== Music-themed games ===
The fourth subgenre of music games are those that are related to the metonymy of music, where the game may feature narration about the creation of music but not feature gameplay related to music. For example, Michael Jackson's Moonwalker would be a considered a music-themed game as it is based on the musical works of Michael Jackson, but as a beat'em up, has none of the typical mechanics associated with the other subgenres of music games. One of the first examples of this type of subgenre, and of music games in general, is the 1983 arcade game Journey, named after band of the same name, which featured some of the group's music and digitized versions of the band members.

== Music games for live performance ==
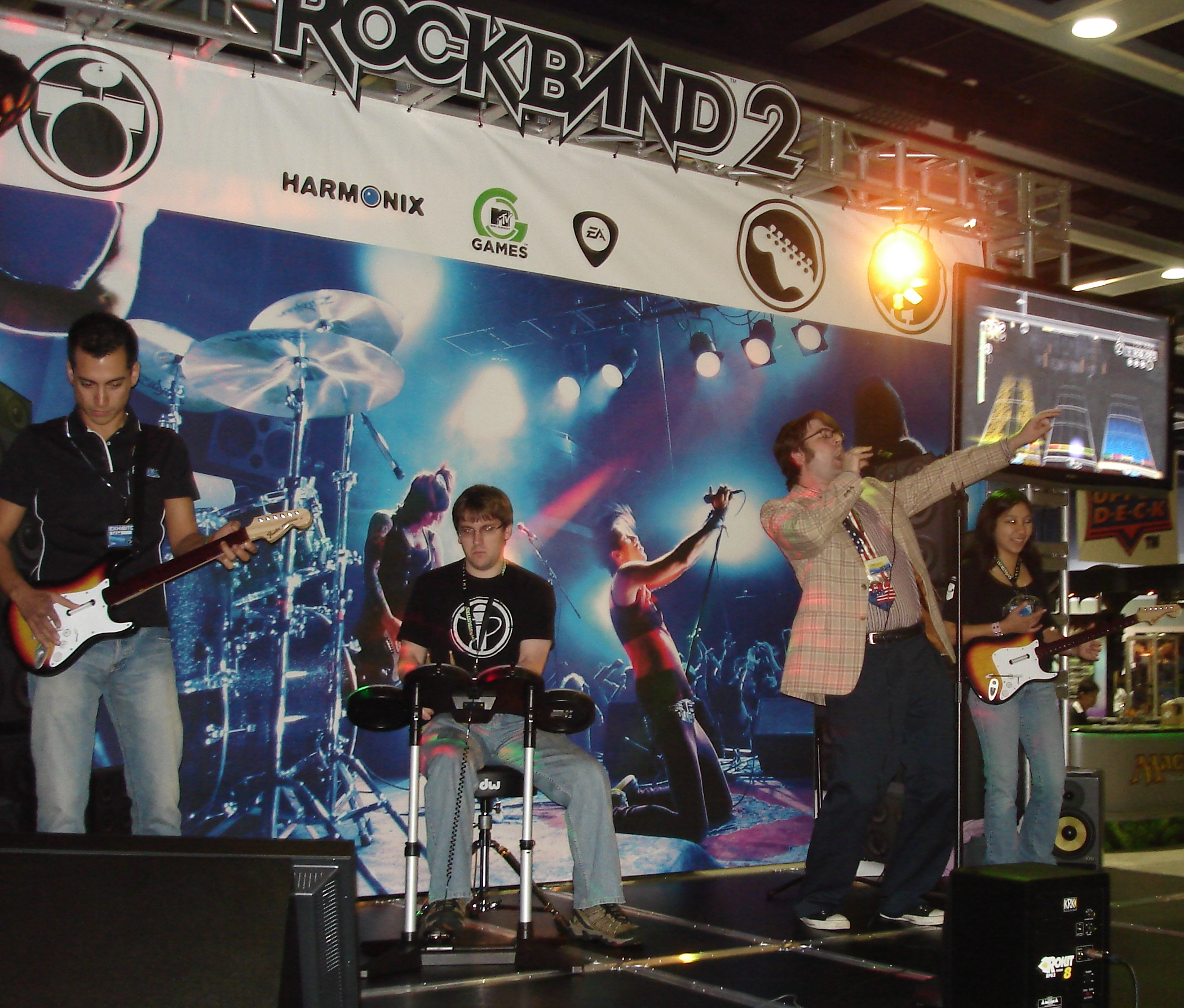
Players performing at a PAX event while playing Rock Band 2

Some music video games, regardless of their fundamental gameplay, may offer modes to allow players to use the game for creating live performances, typically using freeform or non-scoring modes with multiple local players. Games like Guitar Hero and Singstar offer such modes that also give the player the opportunity for physical presence as part of their performance for others.

== See also ==
- Video game music
- List of music video games
