= SimTunes =

- Developer: Maxis
- Publisher: Maxis
- Producer: Michael Wyman
- Designer: Toshio Iwai
- Programmer: Heather Mace
- Artist: Toshio Iwai
- Composers: Jerry Martin (main theme and samples); Toshio Iwai, Benimaru Itoh, UrumaDelvi, and others (included songs)
- Series: Sim
- Platform: Windows
- Release: 1996
- Genre: Simulation
- Mode: Single-player

SimTunes is a children's software toy designed by Toshio Iwai and released by Maxis in 1996.

== Gameplay ==
SimTunes is a music video game. Players select four characters named Bugz that each represent one of 48 different instruments, including piano, guitar, bass, drum, vocals and sound effects. Bugz are placed on a plane and play sounds when passing colored squares that correspond a to musical notes, guiding their path by placing blocks that can turn them left, right, or in the opposite direction.

== Development ==
SimTunes was created by Japanese developer Toshio Iwai, who adapted the game's concept from Musical Insects, a 1992 work exhibited at the San Francisco Exploratorium, driven by an interest in using the computer to allow users to express themselves musically without the need for formal study or practice. Iwai originally created a more complex version of Musical Insects for Nintendo on the Super Famicom titled Sound Fantasy. Sound Fantasy was completed over 1993–4 after a Nintendo representative viewed Musical Insects. Iwai speculates that the game was never released by Nintendo due to the desire to pivot to 3D titles.

Maxis, a San Francisco based company, adopted the project after a staff member happened to view Music Insects at the Exploratorium. Producer Michael Wyman stated the concept appealed to the studio due to its open-ended nature, and the decision was made to rename it to SimTunes. The game was one of four titles in the Sim series announced by Maxis for the 1996 Christmas season, alongside SimCopter, SimGolf and SimPark. In 2001, the game was re-released by Maxis alongside SimTown, SimAnt, SimSafari, and SimPark in a compilation titled SimMania for Kids.

== Reception ==
Reception

Review scores
Publication	Score
AllGame	4/5
Daily News	3/5
PC Home	8/10

Reviewers praised SimTunes as a method for teaching children to create music, highlighting its accessible tools and guidance, and appeal to players who did not have formal experience making music.
