= Make Believe =

Make Believe may refer to:

- Make believe, a form of play

== Literature ==
- Make Believe Stories, a children's book series
- Make Believe: A Terry Dowling Reader, a 2009 book by Terry Dowling

== Music ==
- Make Believe (band), an indie rock band

=== Albums ===
- Make Believe (Jessica Molaskey album), 2004
- Make Believe (Pineforest Crunch album), 1996
- Make Believe (Platinum Weird album), 2006
- Make Believe (Weezer album), 2005
- Make Believe, a 1994 album by Mr. Rocket Baby, fronted by Johnny Goudie
- Make Believe, a recording produced by FilKONtario

=== Songs ===
- "Make Believe" (Jerome Kern song), from the musical Show Boat, 1927
- "Make Believe" (Sibel Redžep song), 2008
- "Make Believe" (Toto song), 1982
- "Make Believe", composed by Benny Davis and Jack Shilkret; see 1921 in music
- "Make Believe", by Angra from Holy Land
- "Make Believe", by Backstreet Boys from In a World Like This
- "Make Believe", by Juice Wrld from Death Race for Love
- "Make Believe", by Kelly Rowland from Here I Am
- "Make Believe", by Kero Kero Bonito from Time 'n' Place
- "Make Believe", by Korn from Untouchables
- "Make Believe", by Memphis May Fire from Remade in Misery
- "Make Believe", by the Pixies, a B-side of the single "Velouria"
- "Make Believe", by Rachel CHinouriri from I Think I Spoke Too Soon
- "Make Believe", by Sarah Brightman from the soundtrack of Granpa
- "Make Believe", by Silversun Pickups from Neck of the Woods
- "Make Believe", by Wind featuring Tony Orlando

== Television episodes ==
- "Make Believe" (The Bill)
- "Make Believe" (Blue Murder)
- "Make Believe" (Casualty)
- "Make Believe" (McLeod's Daughters)

== Other uses ==
- "make.believe", a slogan used by Sony
- Make Believe (horse), a racehorse

== See also ==
- "It's Only Make Believe", a 1958 song by Conway Twitty
- "Making Believe", a 1955 song by Jimmy Work, popularized by Kitty Wells
- Land of Make Believe (disambiguation)
