= Storm Season =

Studio album by White Willow
- Released: 2004
- Genre: Progressive rock
- Length: 47:23
- Label: Laser's Edge Records
- Producer: Ken Golden, Jacob Holm-Lupo

White Willow chronology
Sacrament (2000)	Storm Season (2004)	Signal to Noise (2006)

Professional ratings
Review scores
Source	Rating
DPRP	8.5/10 stars
Rockreviews	8.5/10 stars

Storm Season is the fourth studio album by the Norwegian progressive rock band White Willow. It is the last album to feature Sylvia Erichsen (currently known as Sylvia Skjellestad) on vocals until her return on 2011's Terminal Twilight.

== Track listing ==
All songs have been composed by Jacob Holm-Lupo except where noted.

1. "Chemical Sunset" (Holm-Lupo, Traditional) – 7:58
2. "Sally Left" – 6:33
  - Voice – Teresa K. Aslanian
3. "Endless Science" – 3:37
4. "Soulburn" – 9:21
  - Vocals – Finn Coren
5. "Insomnia" – 5:49
6. "Storm Season" (Lars Fredrik Frøislie) – 4:21
7. "Nightside of Eden" (Holm-Lupo, Johannes Sæbøe) – 9:44
8. "Headlights" (Japanese bonus track) – 6:22

== Personnel ==
- Marthe Berger Walthinsen – bass, tambourine
- Sigrun Eng – cello
- Aage Moltke Schou – drums, percussion
- Johannes Sæbøe – electric guitar
- Jacob Holm-Lupo – electric guitar, acoustic guitar, keyboards
- Ketil Vestrum Einarsen – flute, synthesizer, tambourine
- Lars Fredrik Frøislie – piano, keyboards, synthesizer, electric piano, glockenspiel
- Sylvia Erichsen – vocals
- Øystein Vesaas – engineer
