= The Opium Cartel =

Music band

The Opium Cartel is Jacob Holm-Lupo's solo-project away from his other band, White Willow. The project involves musicians from White Willow, Wobbler, Änglagård, Pineforest Crunch, Jaga Jazzist, No-Man, Rhys Marsh and the Autumn Ghost, The Rentals and more. The debut album is entitled "Night Blooms". It was released on Termo Records in April 2009. It is mastered by Jens Petter Nilsen of Xploding Plastix, and feature artwork by Japanese artist Mako.
