= No Torso =

- No Torso performing in Norway.

Background information
- Origin: Oslo, Norway
- Genres: Ska; Indie rock Punk rock
- Years active: 2003–2009
- Labels: Asian Man Records, Kasbah Records
- Website: http://www.myspace.com/notorsoska

No Torso was a Norwegian eight piece, DIY ska band from Oslo, Norway. The band began in 2001 as a three-piece with just Eivind, Chris, and Martin as members. Between then and 2006, the band would add members and drop only one until the current lineup was formed.

== History ==
Despite being from Scandinavia, the band is involved and celebrated in the United States' ska and DIY scene. This is due in large part to their relations with seminal and long-standing independent label Asian Man Records. Asian Man had released the band's debut full-length effort, Several Brains, in 2006 to warm critical and popular reception.

Since the release of Several Brains, No Torso has recorded a second release, Ready Already, which was released during the West Coast leg of the band's first United States tour. The tour was during the summer of 2008 and, in some instances, was shared with other Asian Man bands such as Lemuria and Bomb The Music Industry!.

On May 19, 2009, guitarist Martin Brostigen announced that the band was breaking up. The decision was made after failing to replace Lars, Chris and Kristian, who left after the 2008 US tour. All of the members went on to form new bands.

They have played together as a ska cover band that was originally named Bekkestua All-Stars and later renamed Yoga Grossist, a word play on the Norwegian band Jaga Jazzist. Nerland and Hamang started a punk band called Hamstern and the Pepsikids; Brostigen joined the Norwegian ska band The Phantoms. The horn section, Brænne, Solheim and Friis, have toured with numerous bands including Orbo & The Longshots, Noora Noor and Los Plantronics. Lars Oskarsen took a break from music to focus on his family but has appeared as guest musician for several Oslo based bands including Dead Parrot Society. Dypvik joined Amerikanerne, a reggae band from Oslo.

== Sound ==
No Torso is distinguished by a sound clearly backed by a solid knowledge of traditional ska music, mixed with heavy DIY-punk influences, with Hot Water Music often being cited in this regard — the result is a sound similar to that of an experimental Mighty Mighty Bosstones. Furthermore, the band's poetic lyrics and positive attitude have garnered them respect within the international ska scene as well as others.

== Discography ==
=== Album ===
- Fatal Fraud EP (2004)
- Several Brains (2005)
- Ready Already EP (2008)

=== Compilations ===
- Plea for Peace Vol. 2 – «Fight the blue horizon»
- Himmelblå – «Fight the blue horizon»
- The Best Fucking Ska in the World, Vol. 2 – «Fatal Fraud»
- The Best Fucking Ska in the World, Vol. 3
- Punk in disguise, Vol. 2 – «Fatal Fraud, I`m glad I`m alive»
- Mowhawks and whiskey shots
- Bergen Rock City, Vol. 2

== Former members ==
- Martin Brostigen – guitar (2001 - 2009)
- Eivind Dypvik – drums (2001 - 2009)
- Bendik Brænne – tenorsax (2001 - 2009)
- Hans Foyn Friis – trombone (2004 - 2009)
- Eivind Solheim – trumpet (2005 - 2009)
- Johannes Sæbøe – bass (2009 - 2009)
- Lars Oskarsen – vocals (2003 - 2008)
- Chris Nerland – bass (2001 - 2008)
- Kristian Hamang – guitar (2002 - 2009)
- Anders Kjaer – tenorsax (2001 - 2005)
