= Child of Eden =

2011 video game

- European cover art
- Developer: Q Entertainment
- Publisher: Ubisoft
- Director: Tetsuya Mizuguchi
- Producers: Sawako Yamamoto; James Mielke
- Designer: Eiichiro Ishige
- Programmers: Osamu Kodera; Takanori Uchida
- Artist: Makoto Takanashi
- Writers: Tetsuya Mizuguchi; Alexis Nolent
- Composers: Yuki Ichiki; Shogo Ohnishi; Genki Rockets
- Platforms: Xbox 360; PlayStation 3
- Release: Xbox 360: NA: 14 June 2011; AU: 16 June 2011; EU: 17 June 2011; JP: 6 October 2011; PlayStation 3: NA: 27 September 2011; AU: 29 September 2011; EU: 30 September 2011; JP: 6 October 2011
- Genres: Rail shooter, music
- Mode: Single-player

Child of Eden (Note: Chairudo Obu Eden (Japanese: チャイルド オブ エデン)) is a 2011 musical rail shooter game developed by Q Entertainment and published by Ubisoft for Xbox 360 and PlayStation 3. Following the player's journey to purge a far-future internet of viruses, the gameplay features shooting numerous enemies from a first-person perspective, with scores based on performance and bonuses awarded for syncing groups of shots with each stage's musical track. In addition to standard controllers, each version has the option to use motion controls through the Kinect and PlayStation Move respectively. It is a spiritual successor to the 2001 title Rez, carrying over the aim of producing a feeling of synesthesia in players.

The game was conceived by Q Entertainment founder Tetsuya Mizuguchi, and was his last major project with the company. Beginning production in 2008, it carried over Mizuguchi's gameplay philosophies from earlier titles. Motion controls were incorporated after production began. The music and sound production was led by Yuki Ichiki, and featured new and existing music from Genki Rockets, a music group co-created by Mizuguchi. The title met with positive reviews, and saw award nominations. Praise was directed towards its visuals and use of motion controls, while recurring complaints were focused on its short length. Eventually shipping 500,000 copies worldwide, Ubisoft was disappointed in its initial sales.

On August 26, 2025, Atari announced it had acquired all intellectual property rights for Child of Eden from Ubisoft. Atari plans to re-release the title on modern hardware.

== Gameplay ==
A level in Child of Eden

Child of Eden is a musical rail shooter. The game is split into six levels called Archives: five make up the main campaign, with a sixth unlocked as a post-game challenge. Each level is replayable, changing each time depending on the player's performance and style of play in the previous run. The aim is to get through each Archive, defeat its boss, earning points and Stars to unlock more levels. In addition to standard controllers, each version uses motion controls as an alternative; the motion technology uses Kinect for Xbox 360 with different actions mapped to hand and arm movements, and PlayStation Move for PlayStation 3 incorporating swiping and stabbing motions with the control sticks.

Each Archive is played from a first-person on-rails perspective, with an aiming reticle, health meter, and a limited number of screen-clearing attacks dubbed Euphoria Bombs. The UI style and sound effects change depending on the Archive being played. During levels, the player is attacked by enemy viruses, which can be attacked in two ways; a lock-on missile attack, or a purple-colored rapid fire attack. Some enemies and attacks can only be stopped using the rapid fire. The lock-on missile can target up to eight enemies at once. If eight enemies are targeted, a score bonus is granted if players launch the attack in time to the Archive's music track. Use of the lock-on attack increases the player's score multiplier. Enemies that have been purified of viruses will occasionally drop health orbs or Euphoria Bombs. Using Euphoria Bombs negatively impacts the player's score, reducing their rank at the end of the level.

There are multiple difficulty levels available; Easy and Normal are available at the outset, while Hard is unlocked after completing the game on Normal. Easy allows players to go through levels without threat of damage from enemy attacks. On level completion, extras are unlocked for the player, mainly coming in the form of decorations for Lumi's Garden, a customizable home screen area. On achieving feats, other rewards can be unlocked, including concept art, music videos, and sound and visual options which alter levels. Additionally, players can post their scores into online leaderboards.

== Synopsis ==
The narrative of Child of Eden is told primarily through its visuals and music. The game's events take place in the year 2219, hundreds of years after humanity has spread beyond Earth. The internet exists as a virtual realm holding all human knowledge called Eden. A project is underway to resurrect the personality of Lumi, the first person born in space, using her preserved memories split into the Archives. Viruses unexpectedly infect Eden and endanger Lumi's existence, with the player being tasked with cleansing Eden's Archives and saving both it and Lumi. Each section of Eden ends with a boss fight against a powerful virus holding a piece of Lumi's data. As Eden is purified of the viruses, Lumi's personality and memories are restored, allowing her to sing and flood Eden with positive emotion.

== Development ==
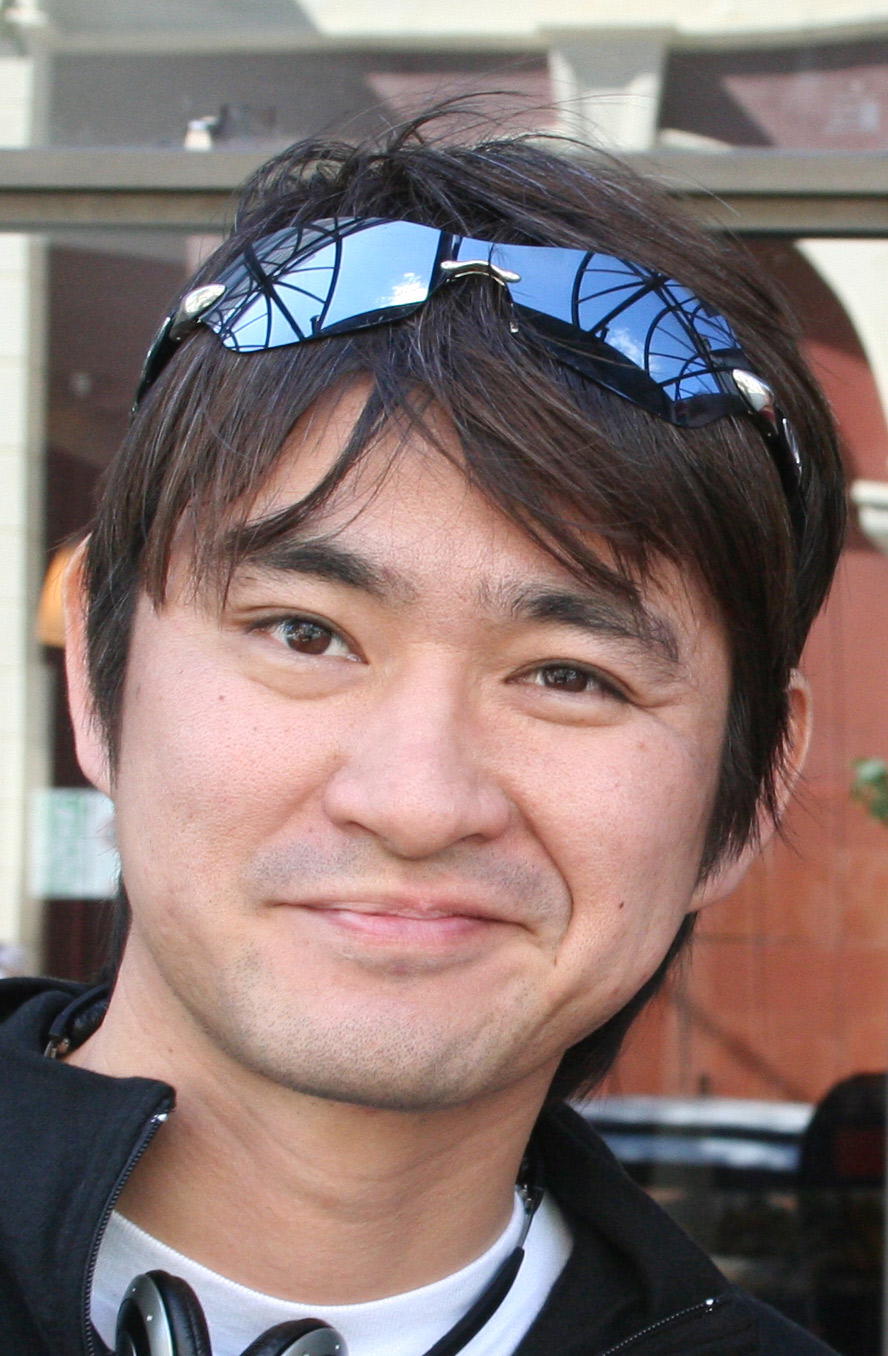
Tetsuya Mizuguchi in 2007

Child of Eden was developed by Q Entertainment. The game's concept was created Tetsuya Mizuguchi, who had worked at Sega on multiple projects including Space Channel 5 and Rez, the latter earning a cult status due to its graphics and music. After leaving Sega in 2003, Mizuguchi co-founded Q Entertainment and went on to produce the Lumines series, beginning with Lumines: Puzzle Fusion in 2004. During this period, Mizuguchi also created Genki Rockets, a music group to create music to his tastes, with their first major project being the music video "Heavenly Star". The reception to "Heavenly Star" prompted a live concert for Genki Rockets, and its mixture of visuals and sound inspired Mizuguchi to create a new project based around Genki Rockets and its fictional lead singer Lumi. The title shares several elements with Rez, and Mizuguchi described it as a spiritual successor. He described Child of Eden as a chance to develop multiple ideas that needed to be left out of Rez due to technical limitations or was not satisfied with. As with earlier titles, Mizuguchi wanted to promote a feeling of sensory immersion, encouraging a form of synesthesia within players. Production began in 2008.

The success of Lumines forged a positive relationship between Q Entertainment and its Western publisher Ubisoft. Mizuguchi was contacted by Ubisoft CEO Yves Guillemot and asked what project he wished to work on next, prompting Mizuguchi to pitch Child of Eden. During these early talks, Ubisoft demonstrated the Kinect peripheral to Mizuguchi, and he was inspired to incorporate motion controls into the title. Traditional controls were still included, with Mizuguchi feeling the game needed additional sensory elements which were not possible with motion controls. During its early production, it went under the working title of Eden. It was originally planned as a PS3 exclusive involving the Move, but the 360 version with Kinect was pushed for, so the team created a software environment compatible with both systems. The game was produced by a small development team of 25 people, most of which were unfamiliar with Rez. Mizuguchi acted as director, and co-wrote the scenario with Alexis Nolent. The title was Mizuguchi's last major project before leaving Q Entertainment in 2013. The game was co-produced by Sawako Yamamoto and James Mielke. The lead designer was Eiichiro Ishige, who worked with Mizuguchi on later projects.

Child of Eden was announced at E3 2010. At the time of its announcement, it was around 60% completed. While always planned for a Western release, a Japanese release at the time was "undecided". The 360 version released in North America on 14 June 2011. It later released in Australia on 14 June and Europe on 15 June. The game received a release that bundled it with the Kinect peripheral in August. Production of the PS3 version began with a small team during the last months of the original version's production. The hardware differences caused issues with the sound channels, as the PS3 had fewer sound layers available than the 360. The PS3 version was delayed due to it being developed in-house rather than outsourced to another studio. The PS3 version was released on 27 September in North America and 30 September in Europe. This version supported Move and 3D settings. Its release for the platform was noted as being far cheaper than the 360 original. Both versions released in Japan on 6 October.

=== Design ===
At the beginning of the project, Mizuguchi wrote a 40-page poem, which was turned into the design and flow of each level. The poem acted as the founding document, read by the rest of the team as a guide for their work. The scenario, rather than being traditionally told, was communicated through its visuals and music, with Mizuguchi wanting players to be in tears by its ending. The central themes were "Hope and Happiness", and the tale of a girl becoming human. The storyline focuses on Lumi, portrayed by Rachel Rhodes and Nami Miyahara, who was described by Mizuguchi as his muse. Lumi was chosen to emphasise the central themes and message. His work writing lyrics for Genki Rockets was long inspired by the concepts that would create Child of Eden. Compared to the narrative of Rez which was fast-paced and action-focused, Child of Eden was paced to be more dramatic and thematic. The game included live-action sections featuring the character Lumi, which were projected into the game once the levels and CGI elements were finalised.

Concept artist Takashi Ishihara created over a thousand pieces of artwork during pre-production, depicting a wide range of objects and environments. Transferring the artwork into the game environment as workable assets was a problem for the team. The graphical design called for a large number of particle effects, which using standard rendering methods exceeded the performance of the console's GPUs and would have required using some of the CPU's capacity. To bypass this limitation, the team used a combination of console-specific hardware workarounds and geometry instancing to reduce the GPU load. To help with effect generation, the team licensed the graphical middleware Bishamon, collaborating directly with the middleware's designers to customise it for Child of Eden. Each level had a different visual aesthetic, and the overall design was meant to evoke an organic natural feeling compared to the technological atmosphere of Rez. They were also aiming for a smooth and soft aesthetic compared to that earlier title's hard geometric style. In the second level "Evolution", a discarded concept from Rez of a whale swimming through the environment was used. Mizuguchi wanted the title to combine design elements from across his work in the music genre.

When creating the design, Mizuguchi classified the game as a "synesthesia shooter". As with Rez, musical notes were synced with the player's actions, though there were more and with many layers that needed adjustment. The first-person perspective was chosen to immerse players in the game's world as far as possible. The motion controls were also designed to help with immersion. During production, the team experimented with the Kinect controls, including testing the possibility of using the entire body for gameplay. As the shooter design was in place from an early stage, the music underwent a long period of quantization so the sounds would remain melodic despite potential randomness caused by player inputs. The levels were first sketched out on paper, then created in 3D and its length was decided based upon its visual design and the music's desired tempo. This phase of production involved a lot of trial and error before everyone was satisfied. For the final level, Q Entertainment sent out a request for fan-submitted photos that would be incorporated into the game, with Mizuguchi wanting to express the narrative themes by people sharing their happiness through the game. The team received between four and five thousand submissions, and had to narrow it down to between 400 and 500 images.

=== Music ===
The music and sound design of Child of Eden was handled by Yuki Ichiki. Prior to this, he had never worked on a game that used music interactively. The game was his first project both for Q Entertainment and as a freelancer following many years with FromSoftware. Rather than using stock music and sound effects, Ichiki and the team wanted to create new or unusual sounds that would make levels stand out for players. Since each level was different in its pacing and design, the music and sound design was also different for each level. Blending the music with the visuals and gameplay elements required the design of a special sound engine, and several MIDI drivers tied to different animation elements. During one point, there were four sound teams, but Ichiki had only one person working on integrating the music into each level. The opening cutscene's music was composed by Shogo Ohnishi, who worked for music company OneTrap and had worked on Resident Evil: Degeneration.

Each level featured a track from Genki Rockets. Four pieces were remixes of earlier titles, while two were original compositions. The lyrics were written by Mizuguchi, who chose which songs to include in the game. The lyrics were inspired by Lumi's feelings of seeing the Earth and wanting to communicate her feelings through song. The choice of Genki Rockets was due to Mizuguchi wanting full control over the design, scenario and music. One of the new tracks, "Flow", was released 6 June 2011 as an EP with an earlier music track "make.believe". The tracks were remixed by multiple DJs, including Metalmouse and Q'hey. Ichiki worked with the DJs, sending them music samples and giving them guidelines for remixes based on the lengths of levels. It was a collaborative process generally, but during the final phases of production the in-house sound team did most of the work. Q'hey worked on the track "Star Line", used for the Evolution level, and "Maker" for the level Passion. Some remixes resulted in complete level redesigns.

== Reception ==
Reception

Aggregate score
Aggregator	Score	
Aggregator	PS3	Xbox 360
Metacritic	81/100	84/100

Review scores
Publication	Score	
Publication	PS3	Xbox 360
1Up.com	N/A	B+
Edge	N/A	8/10
Eurogamer	N/A	9/10
Famitsu	35/40	36/40
Game Informer	N/A	8/10
GameSpot	8.5/10	8.5/10
GameTrailers	N/A	8.4
IGN	6.5/10	8.5/10
Joystiq	N/A	5/5
PlayStation Official Magazine – UK	8/10	N/A
PALGN	8/10	N/A
Play	80%	N/A
X-Play	N/A	5/5

Critical reception for Child of Eden was generally positive according to review aggregate website Metacritic. For the 360 release, visuals and music saw common praise from reviewers, and several noted the implementation of Kinect as being better than many other titles used to market the technology. A recurring complaint was its short length and lack of unlockable content. It was nominated at the 2011 Golden Joystick Awards for "Best Music-based Game". At the 2012 British Academy Games Awards, it was nominated for the "Game Innovation" category. In its 2012 game awards, Edge was a runner-up for their visual award.

Japanese gaming magazine Famitsu lauded the title despite its short length, giving particular praise to its motion controls and visual style. Jose Otero, writing for 1Up.com, was surprised at finding Kinect to be his preferred way of playing the title, praising the game overall but faulting a lack of experimentation when compared to Rez. Edge called it "a masterclass in audio design and the emotive power of CG imagery", in addition to a prime example of the use of motion controls. Eurogamer's Simon Parkin felt that the game was best played with a controller, both due to the vibration feedback and problems he experienced with Kinect that interrupted his enjoyment of the title.

Guy Cocker of GameSpot also noted some difficulty using Kinect, but otherwise praised its music and visual design. Annette Gonzalez, writing for Game Informer, lauded the title's aesthetic and use of Kinect, praising the experience despite its short length. GameTrailers described it as more of a "musical experience" than a traditional video game, saying players tired of traditional music games might find it enjoyable. Kristine Steimer of IGN gave complete praise to the soundtrack and lauded the gameplay and its implementation of Kinect, but again faulted its short length alongside a lack of extras. Joystiq's Griffin McElroy gave the title a perfect score, praising it as "absolutely essential" for players despite its short length and high price. Adam Rosenberg of X-Play noted the high difficulty of later levels and need to replay levels, but again gave praise to the experience as a whole.

Famitsu gave the PS3 version praise for its visuals, music and gameplay, although it received a lower score than the 360 version. The reviewers attributed the score difference to the 360 version's use of Kinect. Cocker shared most of his original praise for the 360 version, also noting that the Move controls were usable and enjoyable. Ryan Clements of IGN was fairly mixed on the game, praising its visuals and music, but faulting its gameplay as shallow, compounding issues with its length and problems with the controls. David Meikleham, writing for PlayStation Official Magazine – UK, noted some stiffness in the Move controls but was generally positive about the game. PALGN's Jeremy Jastrzab was generally positive, and speaking about the controls said that "Move is still an accurate experience that outweighs the conventional controller, and will make this the most accessible version." Samuel Roberts of Play Magazine praised the visuals and music, and how the two were integrated together. Many of the reviewers gave praise to the Move control scheme. By contrast, both Clements and Roberts were negative about it compared to the Kinect version.

=== Sales ===
During the first two weeks of its North American release, Child of Eden was the top-selling title in the multiplatform and 360 charts. By the following month, the game had sold 34,000 units, ranking as the 83rd best-selling title of June. In the UK, the game entered gaming charts in 25th place. In their Q1 fiscal report, Ubisoft suffered lower earnings compared to the previous quarter and did not mention Child of Eden, attributing their profits to back catalogue titles, digital releases and the release of Michael Jackson: The Experience. In a later interview, Ubisoft's sales and marketing vice president Tony Key noted that the 360 version "didn't sell as many copies as [Ubisoft] hoped". By April 2012, all versions had sold 500,000 copies worldwide.
