= Rei Yasuda =

Japanese singer

Rei Yasuda 安田レイ
- Born: Rachel Rhodes; April 15, 1993 (age 33); North Carolina, U.S.
- Origin: Tokyo, Japan
- Genres: J-pop
- Occupations: Singer, model, radio host
- Years active: 2006–present
- Labels: Sony Music Japan; Sacra Music (Since 2023)
- Website: yasudarei.net

Rachel Rhodes (born April 15, 1993), known professionally as Rei Yasuda (安田レイ, Yasuda Rei), is a Japanese singer and model. She portrayed and co-voiced the character Lumi, the fictional lead vocalist of Genki Rockets in 2006. She debuted as a solo singer in 2013.

== Early life and education ==
Rachel Rhodes was born in North Carolina, United States on April 15, 1993, but moved to Japan at the age of 3. She attended an American school at Yokota Air Base. Rhodes is a hāfu from an American father who was from Michigan and a Japanese mother and is fluent in both English and Japanese. When Rhodes was in first grade, she was inspired to become a singer after hearing her mother listening to "First Love" by Hikaru Utada. She was later influenced by Mariya Takeuchi and Love Psychedelico. When she was in third grade she listened to American R&B artists Alicia Keys and Usher. Her younger brother is model Musashi Rhodes.

== Career ==
=== 2006–2013: Genki Rockets ===
Yasuda first began modeling in 2006, and appeared in a promotional campaign for Sony's CMOS Sensors. At age 13, Yasuda auditioned to appear in Genki Rockets' music video by dancing to BoA's "Valenti" and singing "Happy Birthday to You." She passed the audition two days later and was not only asked to appear in the music video, but as a singer as well. Yasuda became the image model for Lumi, the band's virtual vocalist, and providing vocals along with Nami Miyahara. The band's first single "Heavenly Star" and its music video were featured in video game Lumines II and No More Heroes. The song was nominated for Best Song by Spike Video Game Awards in 2006 while the band won Best New Artist in Electronic category from iTunes in 2007. As her junior high school didn't allow students to perform, Yasuda kept her work with Genki Rockets a secret and later transferred schools to continue pursuing a singing career.

Yasuda acted as Lumi in Child of Eden, where she was resurrected as a persona in the 23rd century. The player is tasked with saving her from a malicious virus. While in Genki Rockets, Yasuda gained no stage experience because all of the band's events use high tech pre-recorded video of her for Live PA, with the notable example of Lumi introducing the former U.S. Vice President Al Gore using Musion Eyeliner in Live Earth concert, Tokyo 2007. Yasuda noted that at first her voice and appearance are heavily processed but later the process effect became weaker and her identity became more clear.

=== 2013–present: Solo career ===
After graduating high school, Yasuda decided to pursue a full-time music career in spite of advice given to her to attend university instead. In 2013, Yasuda changed agencies and debuted as a solo singer under Sony Records with her Japanese name, Rei Yasuda, debuting with "Best of My Love", which served as the ending theme to Space Battleship Yamato 2199. Unlike Genki Rockets, the song's music video was shot on location instead of a green screen. In its music video, the UFO came to the world where the civilization hasn't been developed, which Yasuda found that that contrast is interesting. Kenji Tamai, who Yasuda worked with in Genki Rockets, helped produce and prepare for her solo debut after her high school graduation. In addition to singing, Yasuda also continued modeling, starting the fashion blog Nylonista for Nylon Japan and performing for Nylon's special stage in Girls Award 2013 Autumn/Winter. In April 2014, she started shoe blog for ABC-Mart, accompanied with the release of her single "Passcode 4854." She participated in Escada fashion event in April 2014 and Tokyo Girls Collection festival once a year from 2013 to 2016, with the 2013 Autumn/Winter being her first live performance. She was featured in Sendai Collection 2014 and her song "Inside Out" became the brand's promotional single for the brand's event in August 2014.

Her first two albums, Will and Prism, both ranked first on the Japanese iTunes Store's J-Pop Top Album chart and second on the Overall Album chart. She was selected as Japanese iTunes New Artist 2014 and nominated in 57th Japan Record Awards for Best New Artist in 2015.

In August 2015, she performed to 34,000 youths from 150 countries gathered in Yamaguchi Prefecture for 23rd World Scout Jamboree.

She had been appeared as a model for three consecutive years on Flags fashion building in Shinjuku for its 16th-18th anniversary and was selected along with Rihwa as campaign ambassadors for its 20th anniversary. She was both the performer and model for Kansai Collection Autumn/Winter 2016. She was the 60th Tokyo IT Girls model for Vogue Girl Japan.

Her first live performance outside Japan was in November 2016 for the event "Japan Media Mix Festival in Taipei 2016". She was nominated for Best Teen Choice Award in 2016 MTV Video Music Awards Japan.

In 2017, she became Lumine Est brand ambassador and her song "Up to Me" became its promotional theme for their summer collection and "Not Enough" for winter collection.

=== Radio host ===
Rei hosted her own program "City Girls Music" for Japan FM Network since 2016. She also co-host "JA Zen-noh Countdown Japan" with another British-Japanese radio personality George Williams for Tokyo FM in every Saturday noon began in April 2017.

=== Other works ===
Rei was the NylonTV Japan's backstage reporter for Vantan Cutting Edge 2013 fashion show. She was selected as Yahoo! Japan smartphone guide for iTunes Festival 2014 in London, interviewing Foxes, Jenny Lewis, and Clean Bandit. She wrote the lyrics for the Japanese version of Charli XCX's song "Boom Clap" and later wrote the lyrics for some of her own songs. She made a cameo appearance in TBS drama 100 days: Love, Marriage, Sickness and Mom that used her song "Ashitairo" as theme song.

== Discography ==
=== Albums ===
List of studio albums, with selected chart positions, sales figures and certifications
Title	Album details	Peak chart positions		Sales
Title	Album details	Oricon Albums Chart	Billboard Japan Top Albums Sales	Sales
Will	Released: October 8, 2014; Label: SME Records; Formats: CD, digital download	15	13	—
Prism	Released: February 3, 2016; Label: SME Records; Formats: CD, digital download	15	16	5,863
Re:I	Released: March 18, 2020; Label: SME Records; Formats: CD, digital download	44	42	1,478
Circle	Released: February 8, 2023; Label: SME Records; Formats: CD, digital download	65	52	—
"—" denotes releases that did not chart or were not released in that region.

=== EP ===
Title	EP details	Peak chart positions	Tie-in
It's You	Released: November 3, 2021; Label: SME Records; Formats: CD, digital download	161	Campaign song for Shiseido Anessa sunscreen in TikTok (A Perfect Sky, a cover of a Bonnie Pink song with the same name)
Ray of Light	Released: February 7, 2024; Label: Sacra Music; Formats: CD, digital download	82	Insert song for movie Love You as the World Ends Final (Ray of Light) Ending theme song for the Japanese broadcast version of Chinese TV animation Drowning Sorrows in Raging Fire (Koe no Kakera)

=== Singles ===
Title	Year	Peak chart positions		Tie-in	Album
Title	Year	Oricon Singles Chart	Billboard Japan Hot 100	Tie-in	Album
"Best of My Love"	2013	21	27	Second ending theme song for Space Battleship Yamato 2199	Will
"Brand New Day"	2014	84	32	TV Commercial song for Nissen Spring 2014	Will
"Passcode 4854"	2014	84	90	First ending theme song for Kindaichi Case Files R	Will
"Mirror"	2014	19	25	Second ending theme song for the anime The Irregular at Magic High School	Will
"Koiuta"	2015	43	22	Theme song for the TBS drama Zanka: Beautiful Snares; Cover of an Ikimono-gakari song with the same name	Prism
"Tweedia"	2015	23	33	Ending theme song for Pokémon the Movie: Hoopa and the Clash of Ages	Prism
"Ashitairo"	2015	41	33	Theme song for the TBS drama 100 days: Love, Marriage, Sickness and Mom	Prism
"Message"	2016	51	46	First ending theme song for the anime Ace Attorney	Non-album single
"Kiminouta"	2017	65	98	Ending theme song for Natsume's Book of Friends Season 6	Re:I
"Sunny"	2018	128	84	Opening theme song for Fuji TV drama adapted from manga of the same name Caseworker's Diary - Constitutional Rights	Re:I
"Blooming"	2019	78	—	Second opening theme song for Layton Mystery Tanteisha: Katori no Nazotoki File	Re:I
"Over and Over/Dazzling Tomorrow"	2019	105	—	TV commercial song for Kao merit PYUAN shampoo (Dazzling Tomorrow)	Re:I
"Asymmetry"	2019	74	72	Opening theme song for Fuji TV drama adapted from manga of the same name Ex-Enthusiasts: Motokare Mania	Re:I
"Through the Dark"	2020	34	—	Ending theme song for White Cat Project anime adaptation Zero Chronicle	Circle
"Not the End"	2021	62	68	Insert song for Nippon TV drama Love You as the World Ends (Not the End) Theme song for movie Photograph of Memories (Amber)	Circle
"Kazenonaka"	2022	91	—	Second ending theme song for the anime Love All Play	Circle
"Hikarinosumika/Broken Glass"	2025	—	—	Opening theme song for the anime Ruri Rocks (Hikarinosumika) Theme song for the TV Asahi drama Ubai Ai, Manatsu (Broken Glass)	
"—" denotes releases that did not chart.

==== Digital singles ====
Title	Year	Tie-in	Album
"Let It Snow"	2013	Sony Headphone MDR-10 commercial music video	Will
"Classy"	2016	TV commercial song for Sony Bravia	Re:I
"Dazzling Tomorrow"	2019	TV commercial song for Kao merit PYUAN shampoo	Re:I
"A Perfect Sky"	2021	Campaign song for Shiseido Anessa sunscreen in TikTok Cover of a Bonnie Pink song with the same name	It's you
"Each Day Each Night"	2022	SoftBank HeartBuds special short movie	Circle

==== As featured artist ====
Title	Year	Peak chart positions		Sales	Album
Title	Year	Oricon Singles Chart	Billboard Japan Hot 100	Sales	Album
"Onajisora" (Spicy Chocolate feat. Naoto Inti Raymi & Rei Yasuda)	2016	—	55	—	Shibuya Junai Monogatari 3
"—" denotes releases that did not chart.
