= Genki Rockets =

Band

- Origin: Tokyo, Japan
- Genres: Electronic dance, pop, house music
- Years active: 2006-present
- Labels: Avex Trax and Q Entertainment (2007-2008); Sony Records (2010-present)
- Members: Tetsuya Mizuguchi, Kenji Tamai and Lumi
- Website: www.genkirockets.com

Genki Rockets (元気ロケッツ) was a virtual band created by video game developer Tetsuya Mizuguchi and record producer Kenji Tamai. Rachel Rhodes portrayed the band's frontwoman, a fictional 17-year-old girl named Lumi who was the first human born in outer space on the International Space Station on September 11, 2019.

== Biography ==
=== 2006-2008: Genki Rockets I: Heavenly Star ===
The two producers behind Genki Rockets are renowned digital media creator Tetsuya Mizuguchi of Q Entertainment, and Kenji Tamai, a renowned music producer and CEO of Agehasprings Corporation, who has produced other musicians and acts such as Yuki, Yuna Ito, Base Ball Bear, and TRF. Mizuguchi co-produced and wrote the lyrics for the first song, "Heavenly Star", and directed the music video, which debuted in the video game Lumines II and was later used in the Wii game No More Heroes. An AAC version of the song began selling on the iTunes Store in December 2006 and was eventually accompanied by several different remixes from various artists such as Metalmouse, Headwaters, Techriders, and DJ Sodeyama (the "Count Down", "Glorious", "Love", "Space Walk", "Sunrise", "Aurora", "Floating", and "LnM Projekt" remixes). "Heavenly Star" was nominated for the Best Song category at the 2006 Spike TV Video Game Awards. The original song, seven remixes, and a second song, "Breeze", were released as a maxi single on July 4, 2007. The single peaked at number 24 on the Oricon charts and stayed on the charts for 15 weeks. In September 2007, "Breeze" received its own standalone single and video and was later remixed several times. In October 2007, a "Heavenly Star" trance remix single was released on 12" vinyl by Avex Trax's sublabel Rhythm Republic; it featured remixes by Overhead Champion, Delaction and DJ Ten. Genki Rockets was also awarded with the Best New Artist (Electronic) Award in 2007 by iTunes.

In 2008, the Genki Rockets released two new songs: the medium-tempo "Smile" was released for download on March 23, and the rock-influenced "Star Line" became downloadable on May 14. A music video for "Star Line" was also released around the same time. "Smile" was used in an advertisement for the Menard Facial Salon and "Star Line" was used in promotions for the annual 4-day sale held by Parco. It was later announced that the two songs, along with three remixes, would be featured on Genki Rockets' second maxi single through Avex Trax, which was released on June 11, 2008. The single was followed a month later on July 2 by the release of the group's debut album, Genki Rockets I: Heavenly Star.

On November 24, 2008, Genki Rockets participated in the YouTube Live Tokyo event, playing a non-stop mix of their most popular songs.

=== 2009-2011: Genki Rockets II - No Border Between Us ===
In January 2009, a 15-second clip of a previously unreleased song called "Reaching for the Stars" was used for Parco Japanese department store advertising a 4-day sale. Throughout the year, Genki Rockets did not release any original material, but performed at various live events, such as House Nation. The group remixed two tracks for Japanese artists, Crystal Kay's "Koi ni Ochitara" (included on the album "The Best Remixes of CK"), and Floor on the Intelligence's "Fade" (included on the album "Romaholic").

In 2010, Genki Rockets created the world's first 3D and full CG music video, and presented it at Sony's "make.believe" 3D event in Japan. This made Genki Rockets the first to ever host a live 3D concert in the world. In June 2010, a remix of "Star Line" was used in the reveal trailer for the interactive video game Child of Eden. The game was produced by Tetsuya Mizuguchi and Q Entertainment, and published by Ubisoft for Xbox 360 and PlayStation 3 platforms. Lumi is featured heavily in Child of Eden, with the central plot focusing on rescuing "Project Lumi" from a malevolent force. The game's soundtrack is composed entirely of Genki Rockets songs and remixes.

At the 2010 IFA exhibition in Berlin, the group performed daily at Sony's "make.believe" stand.

In January 2011, Genki Rockets performed in the United States for the first time at the CES convention, where a preview of the new song "Curiosity" debuted. Throughout the year, the new songs "Reaching for the Stars" and "Touch Me" were used in Japanese television advertisements. Commercial ringtones of the songs were made available for download through the Japanese ringtone store Chaku-uta. In June 2011, the 3D music video for "Curiosity" was released, showcasing Lumi dancing on a futuristic platform surrounded by holograms. Genki Rockets' second album, Genki Rockets II: No Border Between Us, was released on September 7, 2011. The album updates the band's biography, Lumi has visited the Earth when she reaches 20 years old in 2039.

== Image and artistry ==
Genki Rockets' music videos are all almost entirely computer-generated, and all feature Lumi (who sometimes appears as a digitization and other times in the flesh). The visual art style for the "Heavenly Star" video was created by Japan's Glamoove Inc., and was inspired by Norwegian band A-ha's music video for their single "Take On Me". During live performances, a DJ (wearing a space suit costume to conceal their identity) controls a DJ mixer to play a DJ mix, while Lumi appears to the audience via bleeding edge electronic visual display.

Singers Rachel Rhodes and Nami Miyahara provide the vocals for the fictional character Lumi. Rei also appears as Lumi on the group's album covers, in their music videos, and in the 2011 video game Child of Eden. Rei noted that at first her voice and appearance are strongly processed, but later the processing effect had become weaker and her identity became more clear.

=== Notable Live Performances ===
Event	Location	Display Technology
Live Earth concert, Tokyo	Makuhari Messe	Musion Eyeliner
HOUSE NATION Fiesta -"Best Gig" Release Tour Final-	Studio Coast	See-through LED
YouTube Live, Tokyo	Studio Coast	See-through LED
Expo 2010	Japan Pavilion, Shanghai	See-through LED
Sony make.believe dot park	Roppongi Hills Arena	280-inch 3D LED Wall
3D world Created by Sony, 2010 FIFA World Cup	Nelson Mandela Square	280-inch 3D LED Wall
Internationale Funkausstellung Berlin 2010	Messe Berlin	280-inch 3D LED Wall
Consumer Electronics Show 2011	Las Vegas Convention Center	1,027-inch 3D LED Billboard
Genki Rockets 3D Music Video Screening	Communication Zone OPUS, Sony Building (Tokyo)	200-inch 3D screen from Sony SRX-T110 digital cinema projector
Splash Live!! in Okinawa	Chura Sun Beach	40 x 15 metres water screen projection
Genki Rockets Special Night!!	Toho Cinemas, Roppongi Hills and Nagoya Bay City	MI-2100 digital 3D system and MI-1000 dual projection 3D glass filters

=== Charity ===
The "Heavenly Star" pack was available for purchase for Lumines Live! on the Xbox Live Marketplace from June 27, 2007 to July 17, 2007. A remix of the song was available in the "SOS Campaign Charity Pack". A portion of the proceeds were donated to Live Earth.

=== Other appearances ===
"Heavenly Star" first appeared in Lumines II and can also be heard as a background song for a number of cutscenes and shop sections in the Wii game No More Heroes. It is the opening theme of the fictional anime "Pure White Lover Bizarre Jelly" that exists in the No More Heroes universe. The music video can also be viewed on Travis' television in the Japanese and European versions of the game. Mizuguchi's videogame, Child of Eden, features Lumi as the central character, as well as music from Genki Rockets.

Japanese electropop singer Mitsuki Aira performed a cover of the song during concerts, and a rare CD copy of it was distributed during the live shows. A Cantonese version of "Heavenly Star" was recently introduced in Hong Kong, featured on pop singer Jill Vidal's new album Jillympics, released on August 8, 2008. It is the first track of the album, titled "Youth We Can Hear" in Chinese.

Rhodes sang Heavenly Star live at 23rd World Scout Jamboree and Count Down TV Special. She also sang Heavenly Star in Christmas Special Live 2014 and Touch Me in 2015. Her first solo debut album also included Heavenly Star (Acoustic Version). She sang Heavenly Star again in her concert "It’s you" at Billboard Live TOKYO 2021.

On March 7th of 2024, on the Playstation official YouTube Channel, they post a new music video in collaboration with Japanese singer Aimer. The song name 「Play Goes On｣

== Discography ==
=== Albums ===
- [2008.07.02] Genki Rockets I: Heavenly Star (元気ロケッツ I -Heavenly Star-)
- [2011.09.07] Genki Rockets II: No Border Between Us (元気ロケッツ II No Border Between Us)
- [2012.08.08] Genki Rockets II: -No border between us- Repackage (元気ロケッツ II -No border between us- Repackage)

=== Singles ===
- [2007.07.04] Heavenly Star / Breeze
- [2008.06.11] Star Line / Smile
- [2010.06.06] Make.Believe / Flow

=== Vinyl ===
- [2007.02.16] Heavenly Star
- [2007.08.24] Breeze
- [2007.10.11] Heavenly Star (TRANCE MIX)
- [2007.11.23] Breeze (REMIX)
- [2008.07.16] Star Surfer

=== Music Videos ===
- [2010.12.22] make.believe 3D Music Clips e.p.
- [2011.06.27] Curiosity" 3D Music Clips e.p.

=== Digital Downloads ===
- [2008.03.26] Smile
- [2008.05.14] Star Line
- [2008.08.13] Genki Rockets iTunes Live From Tokyo
- [2010.06.06] Make.Believe / Flow
- [2011.04.27] Reaching for the Stars (CM ver.)
- [2011.04.27] Touch Me (CM ver.)

=== Remixes ===
- [2007.07.18] Melody (Genki Rockets Remix) - FreeTEMPO
- [2008.01.06] Life Is Once (Genki Rockets Remix) - Alpha
- [2009.07.08] Fade (Genki Rockets Remix) - Floor on the Intelligence
- [2009.12.16] Koi ni Ochitara (Genki Rockets Remix) - Crystal Kay
- [2011.06.15] Bad Girl (Korean Version - Genki Rockets Remix) - Beast
- [2012.10.03] Fuyu no Diamond (Re-echoed by Genki Rockets) - Aimer
- [2013.03.20] Hoshi no Kieta Yoru ni (Re-echoed by Genki Rockets) - Aimer
- [2013.12.04] Best of my Love -Genki Rockets Remix- - Rei Yasuda

=== Compilations / Other ===
- [2007.05.23] HOUSE NATION Tea Dance Vol.0
- [2007.08.08] HOUSE NATION Tea Dance - Premiere Gig
- [2007.08.29] SUPER★BEST TRANCE PRESENTS DJ Marie in CELEBRITY MIX
- [2007.12.05] HOUSE NATION Tea Dance - Second Gig
- [2007.12.05] SUPER★BEST TRANCE 08
- [2007.12.26] TOKYO AUTO SALON 2008 presents EVOLUTION #04
- [2008.01.09] D.A.D presents LUXURY HOUSE
- [2008.01.23] THE BEST OF OVERHEAD CHAMPION
- [2008.01.30] SPEED & POWER STYLE 2008
- [2008.02.20] Alpha - Life is once
- [2008.02.27] SUPER★BEST TRANCE x ULTRA Z-TRANCE 03
- [2008.07.02] HOUSE NATION - beach
- [2008.07.23] 20years 200hits -Complete Best Collection Box-
- [2008.07.23] 20th Anniversary -THE LEGEND OF INTERNATIONAL DANCE TRAX-
- [2008.08.06] HOUSE NATION - Best Gig
- [2008.08.06] SUPER★BEST TRANCE 09
- [2008.09.17] ZIP DANCE NATION ZIP-FM 15th ANNIVERSARY ~BEST HIT DANCE~
- [2008.12.10] HOUSE NATION - Fourth Gig
- [2009.01.21] DAISHI DANCE remix.
- [2009.02.04] Hadaka no Koi ga Shitai Kara. Season 3 (裸の恋がしたいから。Season 3)
- [2009.03.04] CLUB LEGEND 20th －1988-2008－ THE BEST OF BEST 50
- [2009.03.04] 20years 200hits Complete Best + aLOVE
- [2009.07.08] Floor on the Intelligence - Romaholic
- [2009.08.05] PANIC Level 01
- [2009.10.07] HOUSE NATION Terminal Disco
- [2009.12.16] Crystal Kay - THE BEST REMIXES of CK
- [2010.07.07] DJ Kaya - Japanation
- [2010.08.04] HOUSE NATION Complete Best
- [2010.10.20] DJ Hello Kitty In The Mix
- [2010.12.15] Gossip
- [2010.12.22] Ongaku 3D Sengen! - 3D Music Video Selection Vol.00
- [2011.02.23] Francfranc presents BLOOMIN' Garden
- [2016.06.22] Tropical Disco Remix
