= Horse to the Water =

Song by Jools Holland's Rhythm and Blues Orchestra

from the album Small World, Big Band
- Recorded: 2 October 2001
- Songwriters: George Harrison; Dhani Harrison

"Horse to the Water" is a song written by George Harrison and his son Dhani. It was originally performed by Jools Holland's Rhythm and Blues Orchestra, featuring Harrison, on the album Small World, Big Band Recorded on 2 October 2001, the song is Harrison's last recorded performance, and a rare instance of him only singing as he was too ill to play guitar; he died just over eight weeks later on 29 November. He listed the song's publisher as "R.I.P. Music Ltd" instead of his usual music company Harrisongs. (In the liner notes of some versions of the CD, the credit is "Umlaut Corporation.")

== Other versions ==
Holland played the song in tribute to Harrison at 2002's Concert for George, with Sam Brown on lead vocals. This performance was included in the film but not the official CD release of the concert.

In 2010 Norwegian band ORBO & The Longshots released their version as a bonus track on their Live 10 album.
