= Johannes Sæbøe =

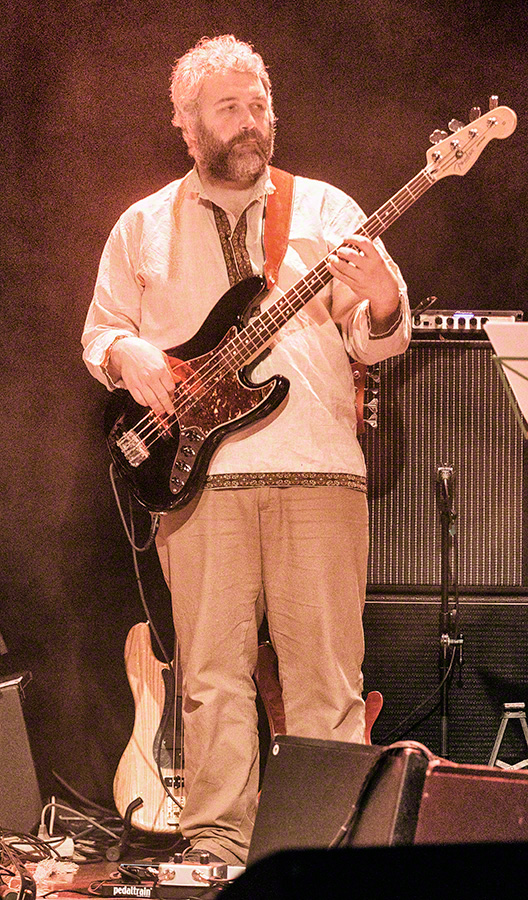
- Johannes Sæbøe at Cosmopolite Scene in Oslo in 2016

Background information
- Born: Johannes Sæbøe; 1976 (age 48–49)
- Origin: Norway
- Genres: progressive rock, ska
- Occupation: musician
- Instrument: guitar
- Years active: 2000–present
- Formerly of: White Willow (2000-2004); No Torso (2006-2009)

Johannes Sæbøe (born 1976) is a Norwegian musician, notable for his act in the progressive rock band White Willow. Sæbøe was recruited by the band in 2000 to play electric guitar and is featured on the albums Sacrament and Storm Season. He left the group shortly after the release of Storm Season.

After White Willow, Sæbøe played in the ska band No Torso for a short while until the group disbanded in 2009. He is now a part of a local Oslo band called Frank Znort Quartet.
