= Hybris (album) =

Studio album by Änglagård
- Released: 1992
- Recorded: July–September 1992
- Genre: Progressive rock, symphonic rock
- Length: 51:39
- Label: Mellotronen, Alvarsdotter
- Producer: Änglagård, Roger Skogh

Änglagård chronology
| Hybris (1992) | Epilog (1994) |

Professional ratings
Review scores
| Source | Rating |
|---|---|
| AllMusic | 3/5 stars |

Hybris (Swedish: hybris 'hubris') is the first studio album by Swedish progressive rock group Änglagård.

Released in late 1992, it would become one of the most influential albums of the new wave of progressive rock in the 1990s. It begins with "Jordrök" (which means 'earth-smoke'), the only fully instrumental piece on the album.

The remastered CD version of the album contains a bonus track called "Gånglåt från Knapptibble". The song was originally included on the Ptolemac Terrascope Number 5 CD sampler. The song also appears on the Hurricane Katrina benefit album After the Storm (NEARfest Records, 2005).

== Track listing ==
- All music written and arranged by Änglagård. All lyrics by Tord Lindman.
1. "Jordrök" ('Earth Smoke') – 11:10
2. "Vandringar i vilsenhet" ('Wanderings in Confusion') – 11:56
3. "Ifrån klarhet till klarhet" ('From Clarity to Clarity') – 8:08
4. "Kung Bore" ('King Winter') – 13:04
5. "Gånglåt från Knapptibble" ('Marching Tune from Knapptibble') (bonus track) – 7:19

== Personnel ==
- Tord Lindman: Vocals, Gibson 335, nylon and steel acoustic guitars
- Jonas Engdegård: Stratocaster, Gibson 335, nylon and steel acoustic guitars
- Thomas Johnson: Mellotron, Hammond Organ B-3 & L-100, Solina, clavinet, pianet, Korg Mono/Poly, piano and church organ
- Anna Holmgren: Flute
- Johan Högberg: Rickenbacker bass, bass pedals and Mellotron effects
- Mattias Olsson: Sonor drumset, Zildjian cymbals, concert bass drum, triangles, tambourines, vibraslap, Po-Chung, gong, castanets, line bells, cowbell, wood block, glockenspiel, tubular bells, bongos, bells, ice-bell, finger cymbals, waterfall, agogô bells, cabasa, claves, French cowbell, African drums and effect-flute
- Pär Lindh (uncredited): guest keyboardist

== Production ==
- Produced and mixed by Änglagård and Roger Skogh
- Engineered by Roger Skogh

== Reception ==
In February 2018, Hybris was ranked twentieth on the Prog Archives Top Studio Albums of All-Time. It is additionally the highest-ranked album of the entire 1990s on this list and the third-highest album released after the 1970s (after Wobbler's From Silence to Somewhere [2017], at #15 overall, and Rush's Moving Pictures [1981], at #16).
