= Panamarenko (album) =

Studio album by Pineforest Crunch
- Released: 2002
- Recorded: 1998–2002
- Genre: Pop
- Label: Exergy
- Producer: Pineforest Crunch, Ulf Turesson, Anders Ehlin

Pineforest Crunch chronology
Watergarden	Panamarenko

Professional ratings
Review scores
Source	Rating
Groove.no	5/7 stars

Panamarenko is the third album by Swedish pop band Pineforest Crunch, released in 2002. The album was recorded following the band's US tour of Autumn 1998.

== Track listing ==
All tracks are written by Pineforest Crunch

No.	Title	Length
1.	"Situation Endless"
2.	"Queen of the Nineties"
3.	"College Radio Listeners"
4.	"Slowly"
5.	"Wake Up"
6.	"Innocent"
7.	"Romantic Strings"
8.	"Car Crash"
9.	"Coronation"
10.	"Leave It All Behind"
11.	"Happy Valentine"

== Personnel ==
- Åsa Eklund: Lead vocals, acoustic guitars, flute and theremin
- Mats Lundgren: bass and basspedals, keyboards
- Olle Söderström: Acoustic and electric guitars, backing vocals
- Jonas Petterson: Acoustic and electric guitars, backing vocals, clarinet
- Mattias Olsson: drums and percussion
