= Viljans Öga =

Studio album by Änglagård
- Released: 2012
- Recorded: 2011–2012
- Genre: Progressive rock
- Length: 57:23
- Label: Änglagård
- Producer: Änglagård

Änglagård chronology
Buried Alive (1996)	Viljans Öga (2012)

Professional ratings
Review scores
Source	Rating
All About Jazz	4/5 stars

Viljans Öga (Eye of the Will) is the third studio album from Swedish progressive rock group Änglagård, released after the band's near-20 year hiatus following 1994's Epilog. Although the album is instrumental, band members Johan Brand, Thomas Johnson and Anna Holmgren wrote short poems corresponding to each of the songs, which is also the source of the English translations of the song titles.

== Track listing ==
All tracks are written by Änglagård.

No.	Title	Length
1.	"Ur vilande (Once Dormant)"	15:44
2.	"Sorgmantel (Mourning Cloak)"	12:07
3.	"Snårdom (Brushwood Hide)"	16:14
4.	"Längtans klocka (Clock of Longing)"	13:18
Total length:		57:23

== Personnel ==
Änglagård

- Jonas Engdegård – guitars
- Johan Brand – bass and Taurus pedals
- Thomas Johnson – pianos, Mellotrons and synths
- Anna Holmgren – flute and saxophone
- Mattias Olsson – drums, percussion and noise

Additional musicians

- Tove Törnberg – cello
- Daniel Borgegård Älgå – clarinet, bass clarinet, baritone saxophone
- Ulf Åkerstedt – bass tuba, bass trumpet, contrabass trumpet
