= Buried Alive (Änglagård album) =

1996 live album by Änglagård

Live album by Änglagård
- Released: 18 November 1996
- Recorded: 5 November 1994
- Genres: Progressive rock, symphonic rock
- Length: 72:16
- Label: Musea
- Producers: Änglagård, Roger Skogh

Änglagård chronology
Epilog (1994)	Buried Alive (1996)	Viljans Öga (2012)

Professional ratings
Review scores
Source	Rating
Allmusic	link

Buried Alive is a live album and the third album from Swedish progressive rock group Änglagård. It was recorded 1994 in Los Angeles at Progfest. This was their last performance before the break-up.

== Track listing ==
All songs were written by Änglagård.

1. "Prolog" – 2:20
2. "Jordrök" – 11:46
3. "Höstsejd" – 14:03
4. "Ifrån klarhet till klarhet" – 9:03
5. "Vandringar i vilsenhet" – 13:07
6. "Sista somrar" – 9:21
7. "Kung Bore" – 12:34

== Personnel ==
- Thomas Johnson – Mellotron, Hammond B-3, grand piano and other keyboards
- Tord Lindman – Acoustic and electric guitar, mellotron, vocals and percussion
- Anna Holmgren – Flute and mellotron
- Johan Högberg – Bass and bass pedals
- Jonas Engdegård – Electric and acoustic guitar
- Mattias Olsson – Percussion
