= Orchestron =

Keyboard instrument made in the 1970s

The Vako Orchestron is a keyboard instrument made in the 1970s, that produces its sound through electronic amplification of sounds pre-recorded as an optical track on a disc. It is the professional version of the Mattel Optigan, an earlier and lower-priced model intended for amateur musicians.

== History ==
Vako Synthesizers Incorporated, founded by electronic instrument pioneer and former Moog technician and salesperson David Van Koevering, started to build improved versions of the Optigan under the name Orchestron in 1975. Intended for professional use as an alternative to the Mellotron (hence the name Orchestron), it featured improved recorded sounds over the Optigan. The Optigan was an organ that played its sounds from light-scanned graphic waveforms encoded on film discs. The sounds with the highest fidelity were on the outer rings of these discs, and these outer rings were used for the Orchestron sounds to improve the sound. Although the Model A Orchestron is identical to the Optigan, the models B, C, and D follow the designs of the Chilton Talentmaker. The Talentmaker was taken out of the market after Optigan's manufacturer – Optigan Corporation, a subsidiary of toy company Mattel – threatened to sue Chilton because of patent infringements.

Some Orchestron models included sequencers and synthesizers. These were the larger Model X and Phase 4 units, though very few of these made it past the prototype stage. While the same fidelity limitations of the Optigan applied to the Orchestron, these instruments were built to be more reliable and were used successfully in commercial recordings.

The band Kraftwerk made heavy use of the Orchestron on their albums Radio-Activity (1975), Trans Europe Express (1977) and The Man-Machine (1978). It is a common misconception that the band Yes used the Orchestron on their Relayer (1974) album. In fact, keyboardist Patrick Moraz did not acquire his until 1975. Yes's USA Summer 1975 Tour programme (June-July 1975) is the first Yes tour programme to list the keyboard (specifically, '1 triple Orchestron', said to be the three-manual Model X designed for him), in Moraz's equipment list. However, the Orchestron was not a commercial success. An estimated total of 70-100 units were built before production ceased after a couple of years. Its rarity and popularity amongst low fidelity enthusiasts makes the Orchestron highly sought after.

== Technical description ==
The Orchestron uses basically the same principle as the Optigan: each note of the keyboard is recorded onto a short, looped track on a pre-recorded, interchangeable optical disc. A beam of light is sent through the disc; variations in the light intensity are detected and amplified.

Originally, there were only eight sounds available for the Orchestron:

- Violin
- Hammond B3
- Flute
- Cello
- Vocal choir
- Saxophone
- Pipe organ
- French horn

New discs have been made available by Pea Hicks and his team from Optigan.com, as well as remastered versions of the original discs. These new sounds are:

- Solo trombone
- Solo trumpet
- Vibraphone
- Solo female voice
- Tremolo electric guitar
- String ensemble
- Piano
- Marimba

The violin sound is the most commonly heard, being used by several bands as a type of Mellotron substitute. The choir sound follows, then the "Cello" sound.

== Models ==
- Model A – (1974) an updated version of the Optigan (used by Kraftwerk)
- Model B – (1974) an updated version of the Talentmaker (used by Patrick Moraz / Yes)
- Model C – (1975) a Model B in a new (black) housing
- Double C – (1975) a double Model C
- Model D – (1975) a Model C in a roadcase (from this model on, Viking Keyboard Systems instead of "Vako" was the name of David Van Koevering's company)
- Double D – (1975) a double model C in a roadcase
- Model X – (1975) a specially built model for Patrick Moraz (prototype)
- Model Phase 4 – (1975) a prototype model that blends the disks' sounds with built-in synthesizers

== Orchestrons used in professional recordings ==
- Kraftwerk's Florian Schneider bought an Orchestron Model A during their Autobahn tour in the United States in 1975. The instrument can be heard on the unofficial live album Concert Classics, recorded during their 1975 tour. Ralf Hütter played the instrument on the Kraftwerk albums Radio-Activity (1975), Trans-Europe Express (1977) and The Man-Machine (1978).
- Patrick Moraz had a special version Model X (1975) of the Orchestron built for him, with three manuals. He used a prototype of it during the recording of Yes' Relayer (1974) album. Moraz also had an Orchestron Model B which he used on his The Story of I (1976) album. His Model X instrument broke and disappeared after being sent for repair.
- Vincent Gallo played an Orchestron on his When (2001) album released on Warp Records. It can be heard on the track "My Beautiful White Dog". Gallo also owns a working Model A, B, C, D, Double C and Double D, as well as the entire VAKO blueprint archives. He purchased his Model Double D directly from David Van Koevering. It was Mr. Van Koevering's personal unit and the last unit built by his company.
- Jethro Tull arranger Dee Palmer played a Vako Orchestron on the group's 1976 album Too Old to Rock 'n' Roll: Too Young to Die!
- Rainbow keyboard players Tony Carey (1975-1977) and David Stone (1977-1979) used an Orchestron Model B. It can be heard on the song "Stargazer" from the album Rising (1976), and "Lady of the Lake" and "Gates of Babylon" from the album Long Live Rock 'n' Roll (1978). David Stone can be seen playing the instrument in the music video for "Gates of Babylon". Rainbow's 1977 live album On Stage includes the Orchestron on a list of equipment for the band's 1977 tour, although it is not actually heard on the album.
- Foreigner's keyboardist Al Greenwood played an Orchestron on their hit "Cold as Ice" (1977), using the violins sound in the middle vocal break of the song.

Like the Mellotron, the Orchestron experienced a revival or sorts in the early 1990s, and many musicians embraced using the instrument for the first time since the late 1970s. The Orchestron, however, had much less widespread use as there were very few surviving examples. And like the Chamberlin, most Orchestron sounds heard after the year 1999 will be from digital samples and not the actual instrument. Exceptions are from noted Orchestron owners and users.

- Michael Penn features a real Orchestron at the close of his song "Drained" from album Free-for-All (1992).
- Benmont Tench played an Orchestron on Tom Petty's song "A Higher Place" (from the 1994 Wildflowers album).
- Semisonic uses a real Orchestron and the violins sound for their song "In Another Life" from their Great Divide 1996 album.
- AK-Momo uses an Orchestron Model A prominently on their album Return to N.Y (2005). The album was recorded using only Optigans, Orchestrons and Mellotrons. Swedish record producer and progressive rock musician Mattias Olsson has since the late 90s recorded several albums that features the Orchestron and Optigan prominently.
- The Orchestron Model A features in the soundtrack of the 2010 Canadian Film Primordial Ties.
- British band Arctic Monkeys used an Orchestron Model C on the albums AM (2013), and Tranquility Base Hotel and Casino (2018), played by producer James Ford and vocalist Alex Turner.
- Robin Pecknold of American band Fleet Foxes plays an Orchestron on the song "Jara" on the group's 2020 album Shore.

The improvement of the Orchestron over the Mellotron was overcoming the eight-second limitation inherent in the Mellotron and Chamberlin designs. Although the sound was of lower fidelity, this was made up for in reliability as there were no tapes to potentially foul as in the Mellotron and Chamberlin. Although scratches on the disk could be audible, one could hold notes for as long as a key was pressed, and not worry about running out of sound when holding a note or chord. The downside of this was that the attack transient was lost and occasionally an audible thump could be heard on the discs when the loop point came around. This is usually hidden or masked in recordings through effects. The audible loop thumps were addressed in another Mellotron related instrument called a Birotron.

An estimated 40 Orchestrons still exist today, and replacement discs and new discs are being produced for the instrument. While not as popular or well known as the Mellotron, the Orchestron is still revered and sought after by musicians for the low fidelity and murky atmospheres it provides.
