= Mattias Olsson =

Swedish musician

- Born: 9 January 1975 (age 51); Hong Kong
- Genres: Classical; pop; big band; progressive rock
- Occupations: Drummer, record producer
- Years active: 1983–present

Mattias Olsson (born 9 January 1975) started his career as a classical percussionist playing in orchestras and big bands on Ekerö outside of Stockholm. As a sideline to recording and producing bands Mattias Olsson writes articles (music-related) for several Swedish magazines.

== Early life ==
He was born in Hong Kong to Swedish parents. In 1981 he moved to Stockholm. Starting as a drummer at eight years old he started off playing in big bands, pop and classical ensembles.

== Career ==
When he was 17 he joined progressive rock band Änglagård. Änglagård consisted of musicians from Ekerö as well as Waxholm. The band was heavily influenced by bands such as King Crimson, Yes and Genesis but also listened to less famous bands such as Shylock, Cathedral and Yezda Urfa. Änglagård quickly became known for their instrumentation skills and their dynamic range often reminiscent of classical music. When the band started the current trend in progressive rock was to use the newest digital equipment. Änglagård decided instead to use old classic prog equipment like the Rickenbacker bass, Minimoog and the Mellotron. Änglagård recorded two studio albums in the 1990s, Hybris (1992) and Epilog (1994). They also recorded a live album called Buried Alive (1996). The title was a joke from Mattias, the worst title for a live album must be ...Buried Alive. After a long hiatus, the band released their third album Viljans Öga in 2012.

He also did some sessions with White Willow and Pär Lindh.

After Änglagård, he joined Swedish pop band Pineforest Crunch who have so far recorded three albums: Make Believe, Watergarden and Panamarenko. The band's influences ranged from R.E.M, American Music Club to King Crimson and the Sundays. Pineforest Crunch had a very strong D.I.Y ethos and recorded six demos before getting signed to Abbas' old label Polar. The band had a hit from the first album, "Cup Noodle Song". The single was a hit in Sweden and Japan and led to intensive touring. The second album, Watergarden, was recorded in England with Radiohead producer Jim Warren. Watergarden mixed orchestral textures with Mellotrons and experimental guitars. Parallel with Pineforest Crunch, he started playing drums and occasional keyboards with Reminder.

He has since then played in numerous projects and is now active as a record producer. He has recorded albums with Deadwood Forest, Devi, Clockwork, AK-Momo, Nanook of the North, Vijaya and others.

=== Theatre and film ===
Together with musician and composer Matti Bye, Mattias Olsson has written music for both film and theatre. In 2009 they wrote music for productions at both Dramaten and Stadsteatern in Stockholm. They have also played together at silent movie festivals and showings both in Tromsø and Stockholm. They have written and played music for Berlin, Nanook of the North and Fritz Langs Metropolis.

=== Studio ===
Mattias Olsson runs his own studio outside of Stockholm called Roth Händle Studio. The studio started as a simple home studio using an Akai DPS-12 and a handful microphones. There was no plan to become a producer but as bookings started to appear albums started getting recorded. The small home studio is where the Swedish pop band Andreas & Jag started recording three albums. Andreas & Jag was Mattias Olsson and Andreas Morland. Other bands that recorded at the home studio are Pineforest Crunch and Nanook of the North. The first real location was at Finnboda Varv just outside Stockholm. At this studio location bands like Kit le fever and Clockwork recorded early EPs. The Studio has a collection of musical artifacts including claviolines, pipe organs, Stylophones, Mellotrons, Celesta, Orchestrons and Talentmakers.

In 2010 the location in Sundbyberg closed and the studio went into storage for a brief while before being relocated to Sollentuna.

== Personal life ==
Mattias Olsson is married to Åsa Carild and has three children.

== Film Scores ==
Lapporten Blått Blod När världen kom till Ronneby Lollipop

== Selected discography ==
- Walrus - Walrus
- Fredde Wadling - Jag är Monstret
- The Winter Tree - Earth Below
- Galasphere - I
- New Grove Project - Epiquirium
- Andreas & Jag – The Uri Geller Syndrome
- Andreas & Jag – Everyone Loves You
- Andreas & Jag – Aretha Live in Pakistan
- Anima Morte – The Nightmare Becomes Reality
- Krysztof Antkowiak – Antkowiak
- Clockwork – Garden
- Ellesmere - Wyrd
- Gösta Berlings Saga – Detta har hänt
- Gösta Berlings Saga – Glue Works
- Ingranaggi Della Valle – In Hoc Signo
- Necromonkey – The shadow of the blind man
- Necromonkey – Necroplex
- Necromonkey – Live at Pianos (N.Y)
- Necromonkey – Show me where it Hz
- Necromonkey – A Glimpse of Possible Endings
- The Opium Cartel – Night Blooms
- Vera Vinter – Du gör mig Rädd
- The Opium Cartel – Ardor
- Vak - I
- Vly - Vly
- Kaukasus - Kaukasus
- Pär Lindh Project – Gothic Impressions
- Pär Lindh Project – Nagelfar
- Pineforest Crunch – Make Believe
- Pineforest Crunch – "Cup Noodle Song" (single)
- Pineforest Crunch – Watergarden
- Pineforest Crunch – Shangri-la (Japanese version of Watergarden with bonus tracks)
- Pixie Ninja - Ultrasound
- Pixie Ninja - Colors out of space
- Pixie Ninja - Hypnagogia
- Reminder – Broken Tone
- Geller – "Judas" (single)
- Vijaya – Vijaya
- Two Times the Trauma – "A Little Sign" (single)
- Two Times the Trauma – I Fell in Love With an Ocean
- The Tarantula Waltz – The Tarantula Waltz
- Nanook of the North – The Täby Tapes
- Ludvig Andersson – S.R.O
- Mellodrama – OST
- Molesome – Songs for Vowels & Mammals
- Molesome - Aftonland
- Molesome - Are you there
- Molesome - Kino
- Molesome - Tom & Tiger
- Molesome - Be my Baby tonight
- Molesome – Dial
- AK-Momo – Return to N.Y
- Matti Bye & Mattias Olsson – Elephant & Castle
- In these Murky waters - In these murky waters
- Saint She – Ska jag berätta en hemlighet
- Tiger Olsson - Vässarö (Single)
- Tiger Olsson - Box of hearts
- Von Andersson noise system - Echoes
- Lennart Grabe - Sånger 1967 - 2017
- Kit le fever – Soldier Blue
- Rising Shadows – Finis Gloriae Mundi (2010)
- Therion – Sitra Ahra (2010)
- Therion – Les Fleurs du Mal (2012)
- White Willow – Terminal Twilight (2011)
- White Willow - Future Hopes
- Änglagård – Hybris (1992)
- Änglagård – Epilog (1994)
- Änglagård – Buried Alive (1996)
- Änglagård – Ptolemaic Terrascope 7" Gånglåt från Knapptibble
- Änglagård – Viljans Öga (2012)
- Döskalle - Aliver at Copperfields (2019)
- The Devils staircase - The devils staircase (2020)
- Isobar - Isobar
- Isobar - II
- Isobar - III
- Isobar - IV
- Obygden - Mumbai
- Obygden - Stickling, tackling och Ättling
- Kinski Pop - Happiness Swish
- Obygden -Isstorm
- Elisa Montaldo - Im still here
- Sonos Umbra - Whiteout
- Liz de Riada- Rizoma
- Obygden - Pärlor
- Blanc - Le long de lignes
- Weserbergland - Am ende der welt
- Obygden - Sommarlov
- T.al.l - T.al.l

== Live & Concert work ==
- Andreas & Jag
- Matti Bye Ensemble
- Vera Vinter
- Vijaya
- Kenny Håkansson
- Tom Doncourt
- Nicolai Dunger
- Kris Woodbird
- T.O.D
- Elephant & Castle
- Molesome
- Wendy McNeill
- In these murky waters
- Jbird Shogren
- AK-momo
- Von Andersson Noise system
- Away
- Tangle Edge
- The Devils staircase
- Ludvig Andersson
- Two times the trauma
- Jonathan Segel
- Öresund space collective
- Donald Lupo
- Pixie Ninja
- Deadwood Forest
- Små Djur
- Vera Vinter
- My god damn territory
- Walrus
- Värddjuret
- Obygden
- Pineforest Crunch
- Reminder
- Incest Brothers
- Dödsbabs
- Pär Lindh Project
- Il tempio delle Clessidre
- Gösta Berlings Saga
- Anekdoten
- Enheten`
- Kinski Pop
- Mögel
- Necromonkey
- Änglagård
- Döskalle
- Akaba
- Mögel
- Washing Machina
- Kajholst
