= Umi Monogatari =

Japanese manga & anime television series

- Cover of first DVD of Umi Monogatari: Anata ga Ite Kureta Koto as released by Zexcs

うみものがたり 〜あなたがいてくれたコト〜 (Umi Monogatari 〜Anata ga Ite Kureta Koto〜)
- Genre: Action, Magical girl
- Manga
- Written by: Akira Katsuragi
- Published by: Mag Garden
- Magazine: Monthly Comic Blade
- Original run: February 28, 2009 – January 30, 2010
- Volumes: 2
- Manga

Umi Monogatari: Minna Aishiteru!
- Written by: Tonmi Narihara
- Published by: Futabasha
- Magazine: Comic High!
- Original run: March 21, 2009 – January 22, 2010
- Volumes: 2
- Anime television series
- Directed by: Yuu Kou; Junichi Sato
- Written by: Toshihiko Tsukiji
- Music by: Ken Muramatsu
- Studio: Zexcs
- Original network: CBC, AT-X, HBC, MBS, RCC, RKB, SBS, TBC, TBS
- Original run: June 24, 2009 – September 17, 2009
- Episodes: 12

Umi Monogatari ~Anata ga Ite Kureta Koto~ (うみものがたり 〜あなたがいてくれたコト〜; lit. 'Sea Story: That You Were There For Me') is a Japanese anime series, directed by Yuu Kou and Junichi Sato and produced by Zexcs. It began airing on Chubu-Nippon Broadcasting on June 24, 2009. An unaired episode was featured in the final DVD volume, released on March 26, 2010. The anime is based on a pachinko game manufactured by Sanyo Bussan.

== Plot ==
The story centers on Marin and Urin, two "pure" mermaid sisters who live alongside the fish in the sea, but yearn to be in the world beyond the water and above ground. One day, a beautiful ring falls in the middle of the sea, and Marin and Urin retrieve it. The two decide to leave their waterbound world for the first time to deliver the ring. After an arduous journey, they come across an isolated island where a high school girl named Kanon lives. Urin accidentally unleashes Sedna, a powerful entity sealed a long time ago on the island and in the sea, and the only ones who can defeat her are Marin and Kanon, as priestesses of the sea and the sky.

Mentored by the Elder Turtle, the girls fight various sea creatures that Sedna has transformed into monsters, but Urin's growing jealousy of Kanon and inability to fight on her own draws Sedna to corrupt her. Taking the role of priestess of darkness and Sedna's host body, Urin releases Sedna's sea half to restore her full strength and declares Marin and Kanon her enemies. The despair from losing her sister and her own inability to cope with darkness causes Marin to lose her powers. Kanon similarly despairs over her fear of making meaningful connections with people and driving them away, in particular her distant ex-boyfriend, Kojima.

While Kanon works to develop her powers and help Marin regain hers, the Elder Turtle is adamant that Urin is a lost cause and focuses on stopping Sedna by force, as previous priestesses had done, even if it kills her host. After confronting her own insecurities, Kanon helps Marin come to terms with her fear, and she regains her powers. They are determined to save Urin, but Sedna absorbs their magic and destroys the stones they use to transform. Confronted with Sedna's darkness, Marin and Kanon realize that Sedna is actually the combined sorrow the islanders committed to the sea, afraid to face what was in their hearts—she's not evil, but a necessary part of humanity. With this knowledge and the experience gained from their journey, Marin and Kanon help the islanders accept Sedna back into their hearts, freeing a remorseful Urin and letting Sedna disappear peacefully. Marin and Urin soon return to the sea, but Kanon will never forget them and admits to Marin that she loves her.

== Characters ==
Marin (マリン)
Voiced by: Kana Asumi

A sea dweller who lives with Urin, Sam, and Warin. While people of the sea are born from shells and thus lack parents or direct family, she considers Urin her sister, whom she showers with affection. When Kanon's ring is thrown into the sea, she is the one who finds it and decides to search for its owner. Later, she becomes the priestess of sea and starts fighting Sedna along with Kanon.

Kanon Miyamori (宮守夏音, Miyamori Kanon)
Voiced by: Minako Kotobuki

A high school senior who lives at the island. She is the owner of the ring that Marin found (it was a gift from her boyfriend), which she angrily discarded when she decided to break up. After Urin unleashes the power of Sedna, she becomes the priestess of sky.

Urin (ウリン)
Voiced by: Yui Horie

A sea dweller whom Marin sees as her little sister, and who sees Marin as her big sister. She is the one who accidentally unleashes Sedna's power. In the middle of the series, she becomes Sedna's vessel.

Warin (ワリン)
Voiced by: Yukari Fukui

A sea dweller, friend of Marin and Urin, and frequent companion of Sam.

Sam (サム, Samu)
Voiced by: Junji Majima

Another sea dweller who is a friend of Marin and Urin, and frequent companion of Warin.

Matsumoto (松本)
Voiced by: Rokurō Naya

An old turtle whose form was a statue in the island's forest until it came to life when Sedna was unsealed. Speaking human language, he advises Marin and Kanon regarding their roles as priestesses, comes to live in Kanon's house, and can generate the fireball needed for one of Kanon's spells.

Kojima (小島)
Voiced by: Miyuki Sawashiro

Kanon's ex-boyfriend. He and Kanon have some feelings toward each other, and Kojima once gave Kanon a ring, but at the start of the series, Kanon ended their relationship over due to tensions regarding how it was evolving.

Oshima (大島)
Voiced by: Aki Toyosaki

A schoolmate of Kanon and Kojima, she is romantically interested in Kojima (and tries to be conspicuous about this), though he does not share her feelings. She considers Kanon to be her rival for Kojima's affections.

Suzuki (鈴木)
Voiced by: Yuko Gibu

A schoolmate and close friend of Kanon.

Miyako Miyamori (宮守都, Miyamori Miyako)
Voiced by: Sachiko Nagai

Kanon's mother, who typically sports a carefree attitude, as well as a penchant for seeing opportunities for money-making. She uses a special golden ring to make delicious pickles, in a recipe passed down in the family.

Sedna (セドナ, Sedona)
Voiced by: Houko Kuwashima

An evil spirit sealed away in part on the island and in part in the sea. The seal on Sedna is broken as Marin and Urin are trying to retrieve Kanon's ring.

Ichikawa (市川)
Voiced by: Satomi Akesaka

Matsumoto's daughter. Unlike her father, Ichikawa does not speak a human language. She enjoys Miyako's pickles.

Utasha (唄者)
Voiced by: Nami Miyahara

== Manga ==
Two manga adaptations of Umi Monogatari were serialized in two different magazines by different publishers. The first one, with the title Umi Monogatari ~Anata ga Ite Kureta Koto~, follows the same story as the anime. The second, titled Umi Monogatari: Minna Aishiteru! (Sea Story: Everyone, I love you!), has a yonkoma format and follows Marin and Urin's experiences on the island.

The first manga, illustrated by Akira Katsuragi, was serialized in Mag Garden's Monthly Comic Blade magazine. The second manga, illustrated by Tonmi Narihara, was serialized in Futabasha's Comic High! magazine.

== Music ==
The anime uses two theme songs. The opening theme is "violet" by Marble and the ending theme is "Tōmei na Inori" (透明な祈り) by Masumi Itō. Lantis has released three soundtracks for Umi Monogatari ~Anata ga Ite Kureta Koto~. The first, "violet", was released on July 23, 2009. The second, "Treasure!? ~Kimi to Deaeta koto~" (Treasure！～君と出逢えたコト～), was released on August 5, 2009. The third, "Tōmei na Inori" (透明な祈り), was released on August 26, 2009.
