= Signal to Noise (White Willow album) =

Studio album by White Willow
- Released: 2006
- Genre: Progressive rock
- Length: 51:28
- Label: The Laser's Edge
- Producer: Ken Golden, Tommy Hansen, White Willow

White Willow chronology
Storm Season (2004)	Signal to Noise (2006)	Terminal Twilight (2011)

Professional ratings
Review scores
Source	Rating
Allmusic	4/5 stars
DPRP	9/10 stars
Rockreviews	9/10 stars

Signal to Noise is the fifth studio album by the Norwegian progressive rock band White Willow. This is the first White Willow album to feature Trude Eidtang on vocals.

== Track listing ==
1. "Night Surf" (Holm-Lupo) – 4:12
2. "Splinters" (Holm-Lupo) – 8:36
3. "Ghosts" (Frøislie, Holm-Lupo, Walthinsen) – 5:48
4. "Joyride" (Holm-Lupo) – 4:18
5. "The Lingering" (Holm-Lupo) – 9:25
6. "The Dark Road" (Holm-Lupo) – 4:17
7. "Chrome Dawn" (Holm-Lupo) – 7:12
8. "Dusk City" (Holm-Lupo, Walthinsen) – 6:05
9. "Ararat" (Holm-Lupo) – 1:35

== Personnel ==
- Trude Eidtang – vocals
- Jacob Holm-Lupo – electric guitar, acoustic guitar, sitar, E-bow, keyboards
- Lars Fredrik Frøislie – Hammond organ, mellotron, synthesizer, electric piano, clavinet, grand piano
- Marthe Berger Walthinsen – bass, cymbal
- Aage Moltke Schou – drums, percussion, glockenspiel
- Ketil Vestrum Einarsen – woodwind
- Brynjar Dambo – engineer (flute & percussion overdubs)
- Luca Kleve-Ruud – photography
- Tommy Hansen – mixing
