= Make Believe (Pineforest Crunch album) =

Studio album by Pineforest Crunch
- Released: 1996
- Recorded: September and December 1995 at Park and EMI
- Genre: Pop
- Length: 44:20
- Label: Polar
- Producer: Gunnar Nordén and Peter Kvint

Pineforest Crunch chronology
Make Believe	Shangri-la

Make Believe is the first album by Swedish pop band Pineforest Crunch, released in early 1996. By the end of the year the album had gone gold, and first single "Cup Noodle Song" had reached number 3 in the Swedish charts.

== Track listing ==
All tracks are written by Pineforest Crunch

No.	Title	Length
1.	"Cup Noodle Song"	3:36
2.	"Unleashed"	3:23
3.	"General Carter Accordingly"	3:45
4.	"Teenage Alex"	3:54
5.	"Barbie"	4:24
6.	"Poor Little Man"	4:19
7.	"Märklin"	3:46
8.	"Lines"	3:34
9.	"French Connection"	3:50
10.	"Smile, Flash, Snap"	3:32
11.	"Trees"	6:05
12.	"Starfish" (Japan only bonus track)
13.	"Very Special Date" (Japan only bonus track)

== Personnel ==
- Åsa Eklund: vocals, flute
- Mats Lundgren: bass, melotron and other keyboards
- Olle Söderström: vocals, acoustic guitar, 12 stringed electric guitar on "Unleased"
- Jonas Petterson: electric guitar, clarinet, nylon acoustic on "Poor Little Man"
- Mattias Olsson: drums, cymbals and assorted devices
