= Lars Fredrik Frøislie =

- Born: 28 July 1981 (age 44); Hønefoss, Norway
- Genres: Progressive rock, rock, pop, black metal, electronica, film music
- Occupations: Musician, composer, music producer, art historian, record label owner
- Instruments: Keyboards, drums, vocals
- Labels: Termo Records, The Laser's Edge, Pancromatic Records

Lars Fredrik Frøislie (born 28 July 1981 in Hønefoss, Norway) is a Norwegian musician. His main instruments are keyboards and drums. He is also a music producer and runs Termo Records together with Jacob Holm-Lupo.

Frøislie mainly uses vintage analog instruments like Mellotron M400, Chamberlin M-1, MiniMoog Model D, Hammond C3, Rhodes MkII, Hohner Clavinet D6, Arp synthesizers, Sequential Circuits Prophet-5, Roland VP-330, Solina String Ensemble, Korg VC-10, Spinet, Upright Piano, Marxophone, Tremoloa and so on.

He is a member of Wobbler, In Lingua Mortua, Tusmørke and White Willow and has played keyboards for various artists such as Xploding Plastix, Finn Coren, Rachel Haden, Shining, Ásmegin, Urgehal, Trollfest, The Opium Cartel and The Electones to name a few.

== Film music ==
Together with musician and composer Ketil Vestrum Einarsen (Jaga Jazzist, Motorpsycho), Lars Fredrik Frøislie has written music for a number of films for both TV and cinema.

== Selected discography ==
- 2003: Ásmegin - “Hin vordende sod & sø”
- 2004: White Willow - “Storm Season”
- 2005: Wobbler - “Hinterland”
- 2006: White Willow - “Signal to Noise”
- 2007: In Lingua Mortua - “Bellowing Sea – Racked by Tempest”
- 2008: Xploding Plastix - “Treated timber resists rot”
- 2008: Finn Coren - “I Draumar fær du ”
- 2008: Ásmegin - “Arv”
- 2009: Wobbler - “Afterglow”
- 2009: The Electones - “If you..ll be null i..ll be void”
- 2009: The Opium Cartel - “Night Blooms”
- 2009: Shining - “VI/Klagopsamler”
- 2009: Rhys Marsh and the autumn ghost - “Dulcima”
- 2009: Urgehal - “Iconoclast”
- 2010: Angst Skvadron - “Sweet Poison”
- 2010: In Lingua Mortua - “Salon des Refusés”
- 2011: Trollfest - “En Kvest for den Hellige Gral”
- 2011: Wobbler - ”Rites at Dawn”
- 2011: Shining - “VII/Född Forlorare”
- 2011: White Willow - “Terminal Twilight”
- 2011: Finn Coren - “Mitt hjerte”
- 2012: Furze - “Psych minus space control”
- 2012: Matilda Gressberg – ”A Heart”
- 2012: Tusmørke – ”Underjordisk Tusmørke”
- 2013: Koldbrann – “Vertigo”
- 2013: Shining – “8 ½ – Feberdrömmar i vaket tillstånd”
- 2013: The Opium Cartel – “Ardor”
- 2014: Tusmørke – ”Riset bak speilet”
- 2014: Haakon Ellingsen – ”Orkaner og fuglesang”
- 2017: Wobbler - "From Silence to Somwhere"
- 2017: Tusmørke – "Hinsides"
- 2020: Wobbler - "Dwellers of the Deep"
- 2023: Lars Fredrik Frøislie - "Fire Fortellinger"
- 2023: The Chronicles Of Father Robin - The Songs & Tales of Airoea, Book I
- 2023: The Chronicles Of Father Robin - The Songs & Tales of Airoea, Book II
- 2025: Lars Fredrik Frøislie - "Gamle Mester"
