= AK-Momo =

Music duo from Stockholm, Sweden

AK-Momo are a musical duo from Stockholm, Sweden. They met through mutual friends at a bar in central Stockholm. Olsson invited Malmborg to his studio for a visit. The group consists of Anna Karin ('AK') von Malmborg (vocals, Optigan and whistling) and Mattias Olsson (Optigan, Mellotron and Orchestron). The band formed in July 2003 and recorded the basis for their debut album Return to NY in six afternoons writing two songs every time. The music is based around the sounds in the Roth Händle studio. After the initial six afternoons, Olsson recorded additional overdubs with the Mellotrons, Optigans and Orchestrons and mixed the album.

They have been compared to Portishead for their use of vintage synth instruments (and most undoubtedly for letting their inner John Barry out of the proverbial cage), Kate Bush for the vocals and Felt Mountain era Goldfrapp.

== Studio albums ==
- AK-Momo (2004)
