= Genki Rockets I: Heavenly Star =

Studio album by Genki Rockets
- Released: July 2, 2008 (Japan); August 11, 2008 (International)
- Recorded: 2006–2008
- Genre: Pop, electronica
- Length: 52:44 (CD), 16:52 (DVD), 72:52 (International)
- Language: English
- Label: Avex Trax
- Producer: Tetsuya Mizuguchi, Kenji Tamai

Genki Rockets chronology
Genki Rockets I: Heavenly Star (2008)	Genki Rockets II: No Border Between Us (2011)

CD+DVD Cover

Singles from Genki Rockets I: Heavenly Star
- 1. "Heavenly Star / Breeze" Released: July 4, 2007; 2. "Star Line / Smile" Released: June 11, 2008

Genki Rockets I: Heavenly Star is the debut studio album by Genki Rockets. The album is primarily electric in style, with Lumi's vocals displaying an omission of vibrato, which she later included into her vocals in the second album. The first 10 songs are original while 11-13 are bonus tracks which are one Japanese version of one of the original songs and two remixes.

== Track listing ==
CD
No.	Title	Length
1.	"Prologue: Earth Rise"	1:45
2.	"Breeze"	3:28
3.	"Smile"	4:23
4.	"Star Line"	3:59
5.	"Heavenly Star"	3:58
6.	"Intermediate: Orbit Swimming"	3:13
7.	"I Will"	4:17
8.	"Star Surfer"	4:37
9.	"Never Ever"	4:34
10.	"Fly!"	4:31
11.	"Star Line (Japanese Version)"	4:00
12.	"Breeze: Summer Afternoon Mix"	4:31
13.	"Breeze: Star Breeze Mix"	5:28

DVD
No.	Title	Length
1.	"Heavenly Star (Music Clip)"	4:00
2.	"Breeze (Music Clip)"	3:56
3.	"Star Line (Music Clip)"	4:10
4.	"Debut Live at Live Earth: 2007.07.07"	4:46

International iTunes/Amazon version
No.	Title	Length
11.	"Heavenly Star (Glorious Remix)"	5:20
12.	"Breeze (Champagne Breeze Mix)"	7:42
13.	"Star Line (Stratos Mix)"	5:56
14.	"Smile (Chemistry of Sound Mix)"	8:11
15.	"Star Surfer (Passionate Mix)"	6:56
