= Genki Rockets II: No Border Between Us =

2011 album by Genki Rockets

Studio album by Genki Rockets
- Released: September 7, 2011
- Genre: Pop, electronica
- Length: 62:48 (CD) 22:50 (DVD)
- Label: Sony Music

Genki Rockets chronology
Genki Rockets I: Heavenly Star (2008)	Genki Rockets II: No Border Between Us (2011)	Genki Rockets II: -No border between us- Repackage (2012)

Genki Rockets II: No Border Between Us (元気ロケッツ II 『-No border between us-』) is the second full-length album from virtual band Genki Rockets. The album was released on September 7, 2011, roughly 3 years and two months after their first eponymous debut Genki Rockets I: Heavenly Star. The album comprises around twenty tracks which remain in the same J-pop and electronica genre as the first album. To accompany the first single Make.Believe the band made a 3D video which has been shown in Expos in Tokyo and Los Angeles. Followed by another 3D video, published in June 2010: Curiosity. Instead the third music video Touch me was released with the CD in 2D. The cover art depicts fictional lead singer Lumi floating on an unknown planet while the earth revolves in the background which is also a screenshot from the make.believe video. The first 13 tracks are original while tracks 14–17 are bonus tracks which are remixes.

== Repackage ==
Genki Rockets II: -No border between us- Repackage

Studio album by Genki Rockets
- Released: August 8, 2012
- Genre: J-pop, electronic pop, dance pop
- Length: 1:13:22
- Label: Sony

On August 8, 2012, Genki Rockets II was re-packaged with remixes (including some remixed tracks from Genki Rockets I) and new tracks and re-issued as Genki Rockets II: -No border between us- Repackage.

== Track listing ==
CD
No.	Title	Length
1.	"Prologue: The Blue"	1:41
2.	"Curiosity"	4:20
3.	"Touch Me"	4:22
4.	"Fluffy"	0:45
5.	"Reaching for the Stars"	3:10
6.	"Dreaming Across Stars"	2:36
7.	"Make.Believe"	5:08
8.	"Flow"	3:25
9.	"Wonderland"	4:28
10.	"Maker"	4:27
11.	"Rebirth"	0:27
12.	"Hikari no Tabi"	3:59
13.	"Good Night"	1:56
14.	"Touch Me (metalmouse + Mix)"	4:05
15.	"Make.Believe (The_AIU Mix)"	5:02
16.	"Curiosity (RAC Mix)"	4:40
17.	"Touch Me (Dorian Mix)"	8:16

DVD
No.	Title	Length
1.	"Make.Believe (Music Clip)"	5:10
2.	"Curiosity (music Clip)"	4:20
3.	"Heavenly Star 3D Dimensional Mix (Music Clip)"	4:37
4.	"Star Line (GRHN) (Music Clip)"	4:21
5.	"Touch Me (Music Clip)"	4:22

=== Repackage ===
All tracks are written by Tetsuya Mizuguchi, Kaori Fukino, Kenji Tamai.

No.	Title	Length
1.	"Crystalfall"	5:14
2.	"Revive"	4:04
3.	"Touch me (kz Remix)"	6:17
4.	"Make.Believe (八王子P Mix)"	6:06
5.	"Hikari no tabi (sasakure.UK BrokenWonder Mix)"	4:40
6.	"Dreaming Across Stars (Bossa Rosa Mix)"	2:42
7.	"Flow (Child of Eden Mix)"	3:22
8.	"Star Surfer (3-Dimensionally Mix)"	6:21
9.	"Heavenly Star (3-Dimensionally Mix)"	4:37
10.	"Star Line (GRHN Mix)"	4:16
11.	"Breeze (SYKZ Mix)"	3:40
12.	"Maker (Child of Eden Mix)"	7:20
13.	"Reaching for the stars (“alto-shuri Mix”~KMSK groove~)"	3:15
14.	"Curiosity ("That's REMIX ~SKN groove~")"	4:36
15.	"Wonderland (Tumultuous Mix)"	4:56
16.	"Good Night (Revival Rhythm Mix)"	1:55
Total length:		1:13:22
