= Pineforest Crunch =

Swedish band

- Origin: Solna, Sweden
- Genres: pop
- Years active: 1993–present
- Past members: Åsa Söderström, Olle Söderström, Mats Lundgren, Jonas Petters, Mattias Olsson
- c

Pineforest Crunch is a Swedish pop music band based in Solna. They have released three albums and toured extensively internationally selling over 250,000 albums worldwide. Their music is highly textured and often features the use of unusual musical instruments to complement the overall sound. Members include Åsa Eklund on vocals and flute, Mats Lundgren on bass guitar, mellotron, and keyboards, Olle Söderström on guitar and vocals, and Mattias Olsson on drums and percussion.

== Discography ==
Albums

- Make Believe (1996)
- Water Garden (1997)
- Panamarenko (2002)

Singles

- "Cup Noodle Song" (1996 single)
- "Teenage Alex" (1996)
- "Shangri-la" (1997)
- "Innocent" (2000)
- "College Radio Listeners"

== See also ==
- Polar Music
