= Land of Make Believe =

Land of Make Believe or The Land of Make Believe may refer to:

== Music ==
- "Land of Make Believe" (Easybeats song), 1968
- Land of Make Believe (Chuck Mangione album), 1973
- Land of Make Believe (Kidz in the Hall album), 2010
- "The Land of Make Believe", a 1980 song by Bucks Fizz
- "The Land of Make-Believe", a song by R. Nelson, U. Ray, D. Alex recorded by Fats Domino
- "The Land of Make Believe", a song by R. Miller and A. Miller, performed by Diana Ross and the Supremes from The Never-Before-Released Masters
- "The Land of Make-Believe", a song by The Moody Blues from the Seventh Sojourn album
- "(In the) Land of Make Believe", a song written by Burt Bacharach & Hal David and sung by The Drifters, Dionne Warwick, Dusty Springfield and others
- "Land of Make Believe", a song by From Ashes to New on the album Day One

== Other ==
- Land of Make Believe (amusement park), an amusement park in Hope Township, New Jersey, United States
- Land of Makebelieve, a former amusement park in Upper Jay, New York, United States
- The Neighborhood of Make-Believe, a segment on the children's television program Mister Rogers' Neighborhood
