= Änglagård =

Swedish progressive rock band

- Origin: Sweden
- Genres: Progressive rock
- Years active: 1991–1994, 2002–2003, 2009–present
- Labels: Änglagård Records, Mellotronen, Alvarsdotter, MUSEA
- Members: Johan Brand; Jonas Engdegård; Mattias Olsson; Oskar Forsberg; Staffan Lindroth
- Past members: Thomas Johnson; Tord Lindman; Anna Holmgren; Erik Hammarström; Linus Kåse

Änglagård is a Swedish progressive rock band whose music draws on influences such as King Crimson, Genesis, Gentle Giant, Trettioåriga Kriget, Schicke Führs Fröhling, and Van der Graaf Generator. The band was formed in 1991 by Tord Lindman (guitars and vocals) and Johan Högberg (bass guitar), and disbanded in 1994. They briefly reunited in 2002–2003, and have been active again since 2009. Their music combines vintage analogue sounds with a modern classical approach to composition and arrangement. They have released three studio albums and three live recordings.

== History ==
=== Formation and early albums ===
Hybris, the band's debut album, and its 1994 instrumental follow-up, Epilog, were both voted "album of the year" in polls of progressive rock fans. The band disbanded in 1994, shortly after the release of Epilog.

=== First reunion and Viljans Öga ===
In 2003, the band briefly reunited without founding member Lindman, performing new material at several concerts, including NEARfest 2003; during this period they debuted the pieces that later became "Sorgmantel" and "Längtans klocka" on their third album, although the songs were then untitled. In 2009, Mattias Olsson confirmed on his MySpace blog that the band had been recording new material, although no release date was announced. Änglagård's third studio album, Viljans Öga, was released in July 2012.

=== Lineup changes and renewed touring ===
On October 4, 2012, the band announced on its official website that Tord Lindman had rejoined. The lineup also changed with the addition of Erik Hammarström on drums and percussion and Linus Kåse on keyboards and saxophone. Hammarström is a former member of The Flower Kings, and both Hammarström and Kåse are members of the Swedish progressive rock band Brighteye Brison. This lineup made its live debut at Bryggarsalen in Stockholm on February 23, 2013. The band continued to tour over the following months. They opened for The Crimson ProjeKct for three consecutive nights, March 15—17, at Club Citta' in Kawasaki, Japan. Prog på Svenska: Live in Japan was recorded at these shows and released in 2014. In April 2013, they performed at the Baja Prog festival in Mexico and at the Prog-Résiste Convention in Belgium. On July 14, 2013, Änglagård appeared at Night of the Prog in Loreley, Germany, with former Flower Kings member Jaime Salazar temporarily substituting on drums. Further 2013 appearances included Ino-Rock in Poland on August 31 and Melloboat, between Sweden and Latvia, on September 6.

=== Mid-2010s activity ===
In 2014, the band played four shows: in the Netherlands on April 11, Mexico on May 23, the UK on August 3, and Italy on September 6. In October 2014, the band announced the return of guitarist Jonas Engdegård. In 2015, Änglagård toured more extensively, playing three shows in February in Italy and Norway, followed by an eight-date European tour in April, and concluding the year with two dates in Japan and four in the United States in November. The February 21, 2015, show in Sandvika, Norway, was filmed and recorded, and was released in 2017 as Änglagård Live: Made in Norway. In 2017, the band played seven shows, beginning with two February performances on the Cruise to the Edge festival, which sailed from Tampa, Florida, followed by five spring concerts in Sweden, Spain, Canada, and the United States, including an appearance at the Rites of Spring festival.

=== Anniversary performances and current lineup ===
In September 2022, original drummer Mattias Olsson posted on Facebook that he had met with Jonas Engdegård and Johan Brand, and that they had been rehearsing Hybris during the album's 30th anniversary year. In December 2022, the band announced plans to perform in 2023, focusing on the entirety of their debut album. The new lineup consisted of Olsson, Brand, and Engdegård, joined by Oskar Forsberg and Staffan Lindroth. The first announced dates included June 10 at Minnuendo in Spain and November 3 at the Haugaland Prog & Rock Festival in Norway.

== Members ==
Current line-up

- Johan Brand (born Högberg) – bass, bass pedals, synthesizer (1991–1994, 2002–2003, 2009–present)
- Jonas Engdegård – guitars (1991–1994, 2002–2003, 2009–2012, 2014–present)
- Mattias Olsson – drums, percussion (1991–1994, 2002–2003, 2009–2012, 2022–present)
- Oskar Forsberg – flutes, saxophones, keyboards (2022–present)
- Staffan Lindroth – keyboards (2022–present)

Former members

- Thomas Johnson – keyboards (1991–1994, 2002–2003, 2009–2012)
- Tord Lindman – guitars, vocals, percussion (1991–1994, 2012–2022)
- Anna Holmgren – flute, Mellotron, tenor saxophone, recorder, melodica (1992–1994, 2002–2003, 2009–2022)
- Erik Hammarström – drums, percussion, glockenspiel (2012–2022)
- Linus Kåse – keyboards, soprano saxophone, vocals (2012–2022)

== Discography ==
=== Studio albums ===
Year	Album	Peak positions
Year	Album	SWE
1992	Hybris	—
1994	Epilog	—
2012	Viljans Öga	6

=== Live albums ===
Year	Album	Peak positions
Year	Album	SWE
1996	Buried Alive	—
2014	Prog på Svenska: Live in Japan	33
2017	Änglagård Live: Made in Norway	—
