= Jacob Holm-Lupo =

Norwegian musician

Jacob Holm-Lupo (born 15 July 1971) is a Norwegian guitarist, composer and producer. He is the main songwriter in White Willow and the Opium Cartel. He also runs Termo Records together with Lars Fredrik Frøislie., and the recording and mixing studio Dude Ranch Studio. With White Willow he is currently working on their seventh studio album.

Partial discography:

White Willow - Ignis Fatuus (1995), composer, producer, guitar

White Willow - Ex Tenebris (1998), composer, producer, guitar

White Willow - Sacrament (2000), composer, producer, guitar, bass guitar, vocals

White Willow - Storm Season (2004), composer, producer, guitar, programming

Wobbler - Hinterland (2005), producer, acoustic guitar

White Willow - Signal To Noise (2006), composer, producer, guitar

the Opium Cartel - Night Blooms (2009), composer, producer, engineer, mix, guitar, keyboards, bass, vocals

Frequency Drift - Personal Effects (Part Two) (2009), guitar

Sinthome - Ficciones (2010), guitar, keyboards

In Lingua Mortua - Salon Des Refuses (2010), guitar

Radiant Frequency - The Abandoned (2010), mix, keyboards

White Willow - Terminal Twilight (2011), composer, producer, engineer, mix, guitars, keyboards

The Glutton - Parts of Animals (2013), engineer, mix

Bravehearts (motion picture soundtrack) (2013), guitar

Mathilda Gressberg - How To Fly (single, 2013), guitar

the Opium Cartel - Ardor (2013), composer, producer, engineer, mix, guitar, bass guitar, keyboards, vocals

the Opium Cartel - When We Dream (single, 2013), composer, producer, engineer, mix, guitar, bass guitar, keyboards

Three Winters - Chroma (2014), guitar

Anders Brørby - Nocturnal Phases (2014), mix, keyboards

Frequency Drift - Summer (EP) (2014), mastering

Haakon Ellingsen - Orkaner & Fuglesang (2015), bass guitar

The Nerve Institute - Fictions (2015), guitar, synth

White Willow - Animal Magnetism (single), guitar, bass, synth, production, mix

The Winter Tree - Earth Below (2015), guitar, synth, mix

Eivind Johansen - Braveheart (single) (2015), keyboards, mix, mastering
