= Make Believe Stories =

1918–1923 story series

The Make Believe Stories series, begun in 1918 under the pseudonym of Laura Lee Hope (best known for the Bobbsey Twins series), consisted of 12 books. The final book was published in 1923, while the series continued to be printed in different versions for years to come. It is highly likely that Lilian Garis and her husband Howard R. Garis were responsible for the writing of these books for the Stratemeyer Syndicate, although other syndicate authors may have been involved.

== Titles ==
The stories, all illustrated by Harry L. Smith, are:

1. The Story of a Sawdust Doll (Copyright 1920 by G&D)
2. The Story of a White Rocking Horse (Copyright 1920 by G&D)
3. The Story of a Lamb on Wheels (Copyright 1920 by G&D)
4. The Story of a Bold Tin Soldier (Copyright 1920 by G&D)
5. The Story of a Candy Rabbit (Copyright 1920 by G&D)
6. The Story of a Monkey on a Stick (Copyright 1920 by G&D)
7. The Story of a Calico Clown (Copyright 1920 by G&D)
8. The Story of a Nodding Donkey (Copyright 1921 by G&D)
9. The Story of a China Cat (Copyright 1921 by G&D)
10. The Story of a Plush Bear (Copyright 1921 by G&D)
11. The Story of a Stuffed Elephant (Copyright 1922 by G&D)
12. The Story of a Woolly Dog (Copyright 1923 by G&D)

== Editions ==
The books were published in four different versions, all by Grosset & Dunlap. All 12 books were assumedly published in each of the four versions (as the series was published in its entirety in the original red cover version), so you can collect an entire set in 1 of the 4 versions.

The original version was shorter than most Grosset & Dunlap books, and had a red cover and blank white endpapers. Books 1 through about book 9 were printed with the same cover image on the book and dust jacket. Eventually around the 9th book, individual pictures were made for the remaining books.

The second version retained the same shortened book size, but changed to a gray cover vice red, with the same cover images. And the endpapers changed to a pictorial, shown below.

The 3rd version changed to a thinner paper, so the entire book became thinner. The book height was slightly larger, and the book covers were changed completely. A selection of colors like blue, yellow and gray were used on this version, and the 4th. The dust jacket retained the original artwork, but added a larger band of white on the top and bottom.

The 4th version was thin, like the 3rd, but the height was increased (now larger than other G & D books). The dust jacket retained the original dust jacket art, but not in the same relation to cover size as the original sizes did.
