= Epilog (album) =

Studio album by Änglagård
- Released: 1994
- Recorded: 28 July–28 August 1994
- Genre: Progressive rock
- Length: 43:44
- Label: Private label
- Producer: Änglagård, Roger Skogh

Änglagård chronology
Hybris (1992)	Epilog (1994)	Buried Alive (1996)

Professional ratings
Review scores
Source	Rating
AllMusic	3/5 stars

Epilog is the second studio album from the Swedish progressive rock group Änglagård. A darker and completely instrumental work, it was supposed to be the band's final chapter, hence the name.

== Availability ==
Although re-released in 2003 on the Exergy label, it was unavailable for a long time until it was re-released by the band in 2010 as a double CD.

== Track listing ==
All songs were written by Änglagård.

1. "Prolog" – 2:00
2. "Höstsejd (Rites of Fall)" – 15:32
3. "Rösten (The Voice)" – 0:14
4. "Skogsranden (Eaves of the Forest)" – 10:48
5. "Sista somrar (The Last Summer)" – 13:10
6. "Saknadens fullhet (The Fullness of Longing)" – 2:00

== Personnel ==
- Mattias Olsson – drums, cymbals and percussion
- Johan Högberg – Bass
- Thomas Johnson – Hammond organ, mellotron and keyboards
- Jonas Engdegård – Guitar
- Tord Lindman – Guitar
- Anna Holmgren – Flute

== Guest musicians ==
- Åsa Eklund – Voice
- Martin Olofsson – Violin
- Karin Hansson – Viola
- Jan C. Norlander – Cello
