= Wobbler (band) =

Norwegian progressive rock band

- Origin: Hønefoss, Norway
- Genres: Progressive rock
- Years active: 1999-present
- Labels: Termo Records
- Members: Kristian Karl Hultgren; Lars Fredrik Frøislie; Martin Nordrum Kneppen; Andreas Wettergreen Strømman Prestmo; Geir Marius Bergom Halleland
- Past members: Morten Andreas Eriksen; Tony Johannessen

Wobbler is a Norwegian progressive rock band formed in 1999.

== History ==
The band was formed near Hønefoss, Norway, in early 1999 with a desire to recreate some of the musical expressions of the early 1970s, especially in the use of the instruments of that time and the compositions of the progressive rock scene from 1969 to 1974. Bands like PFM, King Crimson, Gentle Giant, Yes, Museo Rosenbach, ELP and so on were highly influential on the group. In a few months the basic ideas for the demo and the album Hinterland was created. There was a pause from 2001 to around 2003, until a demo was recorded at Lars' studio, put out on the internet.

Wobbler ended up signing a record deal with the American record label The Laser's Edge. By now, Lars Fredrik Frøislie's vintage keyboard collection had grown and the recording of Hinterland began in June 2004. They did not use any MIDI, and only pre-1975 instruments were applied, for instance keyboards such as Mellotron, Hammond organ, Minimoog, Rhodes piano, clavinet, ARP, piano and harpsichord. After eight months of studio work, the album was ready. In July 2005, Hinterland was revealed at NEARfest in Bethlehem, Pennsylvania, one of their rare live performances.

In February 2009, the band released the second album Afterglow. The album was released on Termo Records.

The band released their third album Rites at Dawn on Termo Records in May 2011.

Their fourth album, named From Silence to Somewhere, was released in 2017 and met with overwhelming acclaim. As of April 2021, it is the top rated album of the entire twenty-first century on the progressive rock database Prog Archives, with an average user rating of 4.35 from over 700 ratings, and the website's thirty-second-highest rated album of all time. It also appeared in the top 40 albums of the year on the user ratings website Rate Your Music, being the highest-ranked progressive rock album on the list. Although the album's niche genre resulted in limited exposure in some parts of the music press, it received reviews ranging from favourable to rapturous on Angry Metal Guy, The Prog Space, Prog Report, Prog Radar, Team Rock, and many others; Sonic Perspectives and The Fire Note ranked it as the best progressive rock album of the year, while the Norwegian website Evig lyttar ranked it as the best Norwegian album of the year.

The band's fifth and most recent album, Dwellers of the Deep, was released on October 23, 2020, and quickly jumped to the top of the Prog Archives 2020 albums chart within two days of its release.

Band members Prestmo, Kneppen, and Frøislie collaborated with other Norwegian prog artists on the long-running project The Chronicles Of Father Robin which released three volumes of The Songs & Tales of Airoea in 2023 and 2024, initially as a crowdfunded box set, and later via individual releases on Karisma Records. In 2025, it was announced that Father Robin are working on a new album together during the fall and winter.

== Line-up ==
- Kristian Karl Hultgren - bass, bass clarinet, bass recorder (1999–present)
- Lars Fredrik Frøislie – keyboards, backing vocals (1999–present)
- Martin Nordrum Kneppen - drums, percussion, recorder (1999–present)
- Andreas Wettergreen Strømman Prestmo - lead vocals, guitar, glockenspiel, percussion (2009–present)
- Geir Marius Bergom Halleland - lead guitar, backing vocals (2011–present)

Former members

- Morten Andreas Eriksen - lead guitar, mandolin, tambourine, kazoo (1999-2011)
- Tony Johannessen - lead vocals (1999-2009)

Guests:

- Tony Johannessen - vocals
- Ketil Vestrum Einarsen - flute
- Aage Moltke Schou - percussion, vibraphone, glockenspiel
- Sigrun Eng - cello
- Ulrik Gaston Larsen - theorbo, baroque guitar
- Pauliina Fred - recorder

== Discography ==
- Demo (self-released EP, 2003)
- Hinterland (September 2005)
- Afterglow (February 2009)
- Rites at Dawn (May 2011)
- From Silence to Somewhere (October 2017)
- Dwellers of the Deep (October 2020)
