= Make.believe =

Former brand strategy by Sony

Sony make.believe logo

The phrase "make.believe" was a global brand strategy for multinational conglomerate corporation Sony.

== Development and announcement ==
Previously, the company adopted separate strategies in its promotion of entertainment and electronics products.

The "make.believe" campaign marked the first time any message has served to represent the company's entire range of products.

Sony announced a brand strategy at IFA 2009 to replace the "like.no.other" moniker. The words "make.believe" form the "Sony Group Brand Message."

== Sony's explanation of the phrase 'Sony make.believe' ==
The company described their campaign as follows:

make.believe symbolizes the spirit of our brand. It stands for the power of our creativity, our ability to turn ideas into reality, and the belief that anything we can imagine, we can make real.

Sony emphasizes the importance of the period between "make" and "believe", saying it is "where imagination and reality collide."

Sony's Group Marketing Communication Department heads the "make.believe" project. Designers of the "make.believe" logo produced an animated version before producing a static one. They made versions in both 2D and 3D. The animation begins with light emerging from the center, while colored rays represent "make" and "believe." A dot appears, followed by the words of the message. The designers found it difficult to effectively adapt the animation to a 3D context, and thus turned to Sony Pictures Entertainment and PCL for advice.

Junichi Nagahara of Sony Creativeworks was asked to create sound for the animated logo. His superior, Nobuhiro Jogano, asked him to represent the sound of light, as well as the sounds of the words "make" and "believe." The company even produced a surround sound version of the sound for the animation, concerned that a stereo version would distract audiophiles. Daigo Maesaka adapted the logo for the print medium, and put together simulations of recommended uses.

== Implementation ==
Following the announcement of the "make.believe" brand strategy, the company included the logo at the end of advertisements. Not until November 2009 did it launch its first advertisement. The ad, created by 180, illustrated a boy on a "magical journey" through the worlds created by Sony offerings. Sony expanded the initial ad to print, television, digital, and outdoor advertisements across Europe. The company launched the "make.believe" strategy in the United States in January 2010.

Sony budgeted US$100 million for its "make.believe" campaign in 2010. That same year, Sony rolled out the second portion of the campaign, focused on promoting its 3D offerings. It broadcast television advertisements featuring American football player Peyton Manning as well as pop singer Justin Timberlake. The advertisements were intended to teach consumers about 3D and reduce misconceptions about the technology. As a part of the push, the company planned to conduct several thousand demonstrations in retail settings, allowing consumers to see 3D technology first-hand.

== Reception ==
The Financial Times mocked Sony's tagline, arguing that it represented Sony's "make believe" attitude of ignoring serious problems.

== See also ==
- Sony marketing
