= ORBO & The Longshots =

Norwegian band

ORBO & The Longshots is a rock & roll band from Bergen, Norway. The band was established in the year 2000 by singer, songwriter, guitarist and producer Ole Reinert Berg-Olsen a.k.a. ORBO.

After ten years of endless driving, wet asphalt and band car on high octane band has learned the craft from the ground. To date, they have released 6 albums, and won the Norwegian equivalent to the American Grammy Award, Spellemannsprisen for their 2008 album "High Roller". The bands' releases can be found on Blue Mood Records / Grappa and Columbia.

The band disbanded in 2012 and ORBO continued as a solo artist.

== Line up ==
- Ole Reinert Berg-Olsen a.k.a. ORBO
- Ine Tumyr
- Reidar F. Opdal
- Stian Tumyr
- Paul Inge Vikingstad
- Magnus Åserud Skylstad

== Honors ==
- Spellemannprisen 2008 in the class Blues

== Discography ==
- 2005: Seven (Blue Mood Records)
- 2006: Dead Man Walking EP
- 2006: Genuine Handmade Rock’n’Roll (Blue Mood Records)
- 2008: High Roller (Blue Mood Records), Awarded Spellemannprisen in the class Blues
- 2009: Masquerade (Columbia)
- 2010: Live 10 (Blue Mood Records)
- 2011: Prairie Moon (Bonus Tracks) EP (Blue Mood Records)
- 2011: Prairie Sun (Blue Mood Records)

| Preceded by Grande | Recipient of the Blues Spellemannprisen; 2008 | Succeeded by Reidar Larsen |
