= Nami Miyahara =

- 宮原 永海
- Born: January 24, 1978 (age 48); Tokyo, Japan
- Occupations: Voice actress; singer
- Years active: 1986–present
- Employer: Atomic Monkey
- Children: 1
- Musical career
- Genre: J-pop
- Instruments: Vocals; guitar
- Years active: 2003–present
- Label: Dream Records

Nami Miyahara (宮原 永海, Miyahara Nami; born January 24, 1978 in Tokyo) is a Japanese voice actress and singer associated by Atomic Monkey. Miyahara debuted as a voice actress in 1998 as Shouko Yamanobe in Mamotte Shugogetten. Notable roles she has played include Momoko Asuka and Masaru Yada from the Ojamajo Doremi series, Wallace from Digimon Adventure 02, Miyako Gōtokuji/Rolling Bubbles from Powerpuff Girls Z, Lyuze from Casshern Sins, and Akari Tsukumo from Yu-Gi-Oh! Zexal.

In addition to her voice acting, Miyahara also pursued a singing career and released her first extended play, Reason, in 2003. She also provided vocals for Genki Rockets.

== Early life ==
When Miyahara was in junior high, she and her family moved to Austria, where she attended an international school and learned English.

== Career ==
=== Voice acting career ===
Miyahara began her voice acting career in 1997.

=== Musical career ===
Miyahara pursued a musical career alongside her voice acting works. Aside from performing image songs associated with some of the characters she voiced, she performs at open mics. She released her first indies album, titled REASON, in 2003. Miyahara also lent her vocals to some of Genki Rockets' songs as part of fictional space girl Lumi's image.

Miyahara was also a featured artist in one of FreeTEMPO's albums.

== Personal life ==
Miyahara gave birth to a boy on July 29, 2019.

== Discography ==
=== Extended plays ===
Title	Details	Peak chart positions	Sales
Title	Details	JPN	Sales
Reason	Released: January 22, 2003; Label: Dream Records; Formats: CD	—	—
"—" denotes releases that did not chart or were not released in that region.

=== Singles ===
==== As featured artist ====
Title	Year	Peak chart positions	Sales	Album
Title	Year	JPN	Sales	Album
"Dreaming" (FreeTEMPO featuring Nami Miyahara)	2007			Sounds

== Filmography ==
=== Film and television ===
Year	Title	Role	Notes
1998	Mamotte Shugogetten	Shouko Yamanobe	
1998	Yume no Crayon Oukoku	Yukkutakku	
1998	St. Luminous Mission High School	Irina Goinov	
1999	Magic Users' Club	Jurika Jinno	
1999	Ojamajo Doremi	Masaru Yada	
2000	Ojamajo Doremi #	Masaru Yada	
2000	Digimon Adventure 02: Part I: Digimon Hurricane Touchdown!! / Part 2: Supreme Evolution!! The Golden Digimentals	Wallace	First major role in theatrical film; also voiced the character in subsequent drama CDs
2001	Mo~tto! Ojamajo Doremi	Momoko Asuka, Masaru Yada, Nini	
2002	Ojamajo Doremi Dokka~n!	Momoko Asuka, Masaru Yada, Nini	
2005	Kouchuu Ouja Mushiking ~Mori no Tami no Densetsu~	Popo	
2006	Demashita! Powerpuff Girls Z	Miyako Gōtokuji/Rolling Bubbles	
2008	Casshern Sins	Lyuze, Janice (singing voice)	Provided the singing voice of Janice only.
2008	Inazuma Eleven	Yuuya Kogure	
2009	Umi Monogatari ~Anata ga Ite Kureta Koto~	Utasha	
2009	Astro Boy	Sludge	
2010	So Ra No Wo To	Aisha Aldola	Performed in German (in-universe language of Roman Empire)
2011	Yu-Gi-Oh! Zexal	Akari Tsukumo	
2020	Looking for Magical Doremi	Momoko Asuka	
2023	Detective Conan: Black Iron Submarine	Nina	

=== Video games ===
Year	Title	Role	Notes
2004	Ojamajo Adventure: Naisho no Mahou	Momoko Asuka	
2009-25	Inazuma Eleven series	Yuuya Kogure / Ian Marron	
2019	Puyo Puyo Quest	Momoko Asuka	Voiced as part of an event celebrating the 20th anniversary of the Ojamajo Doremi anime

== Dubbing ==
=== Animation ===
  - Ultimate Spider-Man - Jessie Prescott (Debby Ryan)

=== Live-action ===
- Debby Ryan
  - The Suite Life on Deck - Bailey Pickett
  - Wizards of Waverly Place - Bailey Pickett
  - 16 Wishes - Abigail "Abby" Jensen
  - The Suite Life Movie - Bailey Pickett
  - Jessie - Jessie Prescott
  - Zeke and Luther - Courtney Mills
  - Radio Rebel - Tara Adams
  - Austin & Ally - Jessie Prescott
  - Good Luck Charlie - Jessie Prescott
  - Girl Meets World - Aubrey
- Bridge of Spies – Peggy Donovan (Jillian Lebling)
- True Memoirs of an International Assassin - Rosa Bolivar (Zulay Henao)
- Invasion (2021 TV series) - Mitsuki Yamano (Shioli Kutsuna)
