= White Willow (band) =

Norwegian progressive rock band

White Willow is a Norwegian art rock band, mixing elements of orchestral pop, 1970s progressive rock, jazz-rock and electronic elements.

White Willow's influences range from 10cc, The Beach Boys, Big Star and Steely Dan to King Crimson, Magma, Weather Report and Nick Drake and Joni Mitchell. Typical of their sound is the prominence of female vocals, flute and mellotrons and analog synthesizers.

Many guest artists have appeared on White Willow's albums. They include Norwegian singer/songwriter Finn Coren, British art-pop vocalist Tim Bowness, and US avant-rock guitarist Michael S. Judge.

== Band members ==
=== Current band members ===
- Venke Knutson - vocals
- Lars Fredrik Frøislie - keyboards
- Ketil Einarsen - flutes
- Jacob Holm-Lupo - guitars
- Ellen Andrea Wang - bass
- Mattias Olsson - drums

=== Former band members ===
- Sylvia Erichsen - vocals
- Trude Eidtang - vocals
- Marthe Berger Walthinsen - bass
- Aage Moltke Schou - drums
- Erik Holm - drums
- Danny Young - drums
- Alexander Engebretsen - bass
- Per Christian Stenberg - bass
- Eldrid Johansen - vocals
- Sara Trondal - vocals
- Tirill Mohn - violin
- Audun Kjus - flute and vocals
- Jan Tariq Rahman - keyboards, bass, woodwinds and vocals (founding member)

== Discography ==
- Ignis Fatuus (1995, The Laser's Edge)
- Ex Tenebris (1998, The Laser's Edge)
- Sacrament (2000, The Laser's Edge)
- Storm Season (2004, The Laser's Edge; Japanese version released through Avalon/Marquee)
- Signal to Noise (2006, The Laser's Edge)
- Terminal Twilight (2011, Termo Records)
- Occultations: An Introduction to White Willow (2015, White Willow)
- Future Hopes (2017, The Laser's Edge)
