= Video games as an art form =

Artistic value of video games

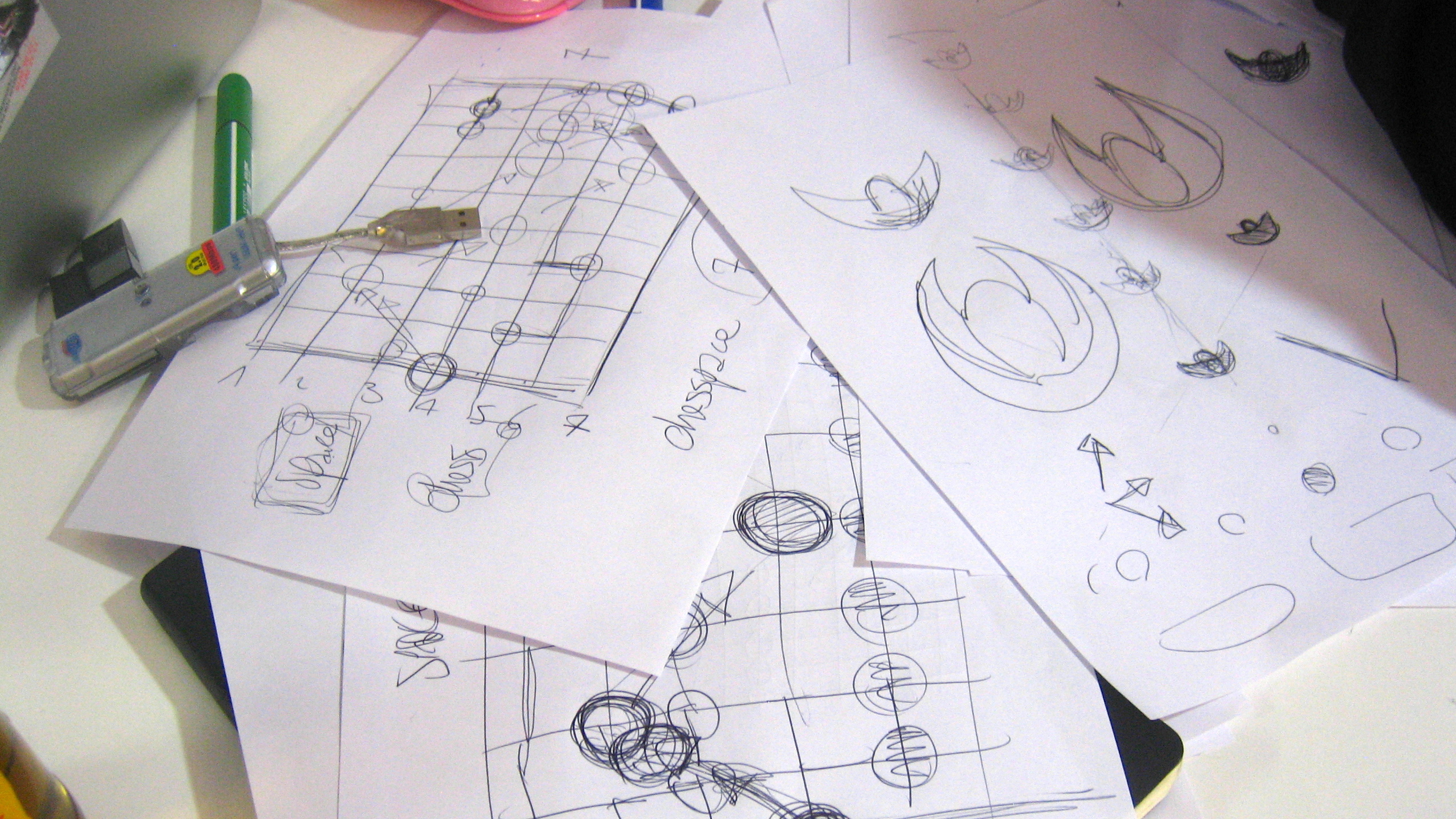
While creating a video game requires the use of artistic materials and techniques like the sketches above, whether the final product counts as art is up for debate.

The concept of video games as a form of art is a commonly debated topic within the entertainment industry. Though video games have been given legal protection as creative works by the Supreme Court of the United States, the philosophical proposition that video games are works of art remains in question, even when considering the contribution of expressive elements such as acting, visuals, design, stories, interaction, and music. Even art games, games purposely designed to be a work of creative expression, have been challenged as works of art by some critics.

== History ==
In 1983, the video game magazine Video Games Player stated that video games "are as much an art form as any other field of entertainment".

The earliest institutional consideration of the video game as an art form came in the late 1980s when art museums began retrospective displays of then newly-outdated first and second generation games. In exhibitions such as the Museum of the Moving Image's 1989 "Hot Circuits: A Video Arcade", video games were showcased as preformed works whose quality as art came from the intent of the curator to display them as art. Further explorations of this theme were set up in the late 1990s and early 2000s with exhibitions like the Walker Art Center's "Beyond Interface" (1998), the online "Cracking the Maze - Game Plug-Ins as Hacker Art" (1999), the UCI Beall Centre's "Shift-Ctrl" (2000), and a number of shows in 2001.

The concept of the video game as a Duchamp-style readymade or as found object resonated with early developers of the art game. In her 2003 Digital Arts and Culture paper, "Arcade Classics Span Art? Current Trends in the Art Game Genre", professor Tiffany Holmes noted that a significant emerging trend within the digital art community was the development of playable video game pieces referencing or paying homage to earlier classic works like Breakout, Asteroids, Pac-Man, and Burgertime. In modifying the code of simplistic early games or by creating art mods for more complex games like Quake, the art game genre emerged from the intersection of commercial games and contemporary digital art.

At the 2010 Art History of Games conference in Atlanta, Georgia, professor Celia Pearce further noted that alongside Duchamp's art productions, the Fluxus movement of the 1960s, and most immediately the New Games Movement had paved the way for more modern "art games". Works such as Lantz' Pac Manhattan, according to Pearce, have become something like performance art pieces. Most recently, a strong overlap has developed between art games and indie games. This meeting of the art game movement and the indie game movement is important according to Professor Pearce, insofar as it brings art games to more eyes and allows for greater potential to explore in indie games.

In March 2006, the French Minister of Culture first characterized video games as cultural goods and as "a form of artistic expression", granting the industry a tax subsidy and inducting two French game designers (Michel Ancel, Frédérick Raynal) and one Japanese game designer (Shigeru Miyamoto) into the Ordre des Arts et des Lettres. In May 2011, the United States National Endowment for the Arts, in accepting grants for art projects for 2012, expanded the allowable projects to include "interactive games", furthering the recognition of video games as an art form. Similarly, the United States Supreme Court ruled that video games were protected speech like other forms of art in the June 2011 decision for Brown v. Entertainment Merchants Association. In Germany, prior to August 2018, the Unterhaltungssoftware Selbstkontrolle (USK) software ratings body enforced Strafgesetzbuch (German code) section 86a as outlined by the German government, which banned the sale of games that contained imagery of extremist groups such as Nazis; while Section 86a allowed for use of these images in artistic and scientific works, video games were not seen to fall within an artistic use. On August 9, 2018, the German government agreed to recognize some of the artistic nature of video games and softened the restriction on Section 86a, allowing the USK to consider games with such imagery as long as they fell within the social adequacy clause of Section 86a.

The lines between video games and art become blurred when exhibitions fit the labels of both game and interactive art. The Smithsonian American Art Museum held an exhibit in 2012, entitled "The Art of Video Games", which was designed to demonstrate the artistic nature of video games, including the impact of older works and the subsequent influence of video games on creative culture. The Smithsonian later added Flower and Halo 2600, games from this collection, as permanent exhibits within the museum. Similarly, the Museum of Modern Art in New York City aims to collect forty historically important video games in their original format to exhibit, showcasing video game interaction design as part of a broader effort to "celebrate gaming as an artistic medium". The annual "Into the Pixel" art exhibit held at the time of the Electronic Entertainment Expo highlights video game art selected by a panel of both video game and art industry professionals.

The Tribeca Film Festival, while having featured video games in the past, had its first Tribeca Games Award at the 2021 event.

== Philosophical arguments ==
Video games have been of interest in philosophical aesthetics and the philosophy of the arts since at least the mid-2000s where a growing body of literature typically examines video games in the context of traditional philosophical questions concerning the arts. One such question is whether video games are a form of art. In a 2005 essay in the journal Contemporary Aesthetics, "Are Video Games Art?", the philosopher Aaron Smuts argued that "by any major definition of art many modern video games should be considered art". The New Zealand philosopher Grant Tavinor's 2009 book The Art of Videogames argues that when considered under disjunctive definitions or cluster accounts that have been employed to address the question of the definition of art itself, that "though they have their own non-artistic historical and conceptual precedents, videogames sit in an appropriate conceptual relationship to uncontested artworks and count as art". In a later paper Tavinor also argues that despite ontological differences to other examples in the category, video games count as examples of what the philosopher Noël Carroll has referred to as "mass art". Dominic McIver Lopes, a philosopher at the University of British Columbia, writing in a book on computer art, gives similar reasons to consider video games as a form of art, though also noting that their characteristic interactivity may mean that in comparison with established forms of art such as architecture and music, each "realizes positive aesthetic properties in its own way".

Following on from these initial philosophical accounts of video games as art, video games have become an established topic in the philosophy of the arts, appearing as a frequent topic in aesthetics journals such as The Journal of Aesthetics and Art Criticism; receiving their own entry in the Oxford Encyclopedia of Aesthetics; and appearing in multiple readers and collections of works in philosophical aesthetics.

Much of the literature has now turned from the question of whether video games are art, to the question of what kind of art form they are. University of St Andrews philosopher Berys Gaut considers video games to be a case of "interactive cinema". In The Aesthetics of Videogames, a 2018 collection of philosophical essays on games edited by Tavinor and Jon Robson, several philosophers consider the kind of art form games are, and whether they include characteristic or unique artistic interpretative practices. In his chapter, "Appreciating videogames", Zach Jurgensen, while accepting that previous philosophical arguments that videogames are art are "convincing", finds that they typically neglect gameplay in their accounts, and "what makes studying videogames as works of art worthwhile is grounded partly in our understanding of them as games" In 2020, University of Utah philosophy professor C. Thi Nguyen published Games: Agency as Art to examine the concept of video games as art in the context of the wider consideration of non-electronic games.

=== Empathy games ===
While many video games are recognized as art for their visual imagery and storytelling, another class of games has gained attention for creating an emotional experience for the player, generally by having the user role-play as a character under a stress-inducing situation, covering topics associated with poverty, sexuality, and physical and mental illnesses. Such games are considered to be examples of an empathy game, loosely described by Patrick Begley of the Sydney Morning Herald as a game that "asks players to inhabit their character's emotional worlds". For example, Papers, Please is a game ostensibly about being a border agent checking passports and other travel documents in a fictional Eastern Bloc country, with the player-character's pay reflecting how few mistakes they made and going to feed and house their family. The game requires the player to make decisions about letting in certain people who may not have all their proper papers but have dire reason to be allowed through such as to be reunited with their own loved ones, at the cost of their own pay and well-being of their family.

== Reception ==
=== Legal status ===
American courts first began examining the question of whether video games were entitled to constitutional guarantees of free speech as under the First Amendment in strings of cases starting around 1982 related to ordinances that limited minors from buying video games or from video game arcades, such as America's Best Family Showplace Corp. v. City of New York, Dept. of Bldgs. These ordinances and regulations had come from a moral panic around the potential for violence and addictive behavior of video games and arcades in the wake of the golden age of the arcade, with games like Space Invaders and Pac-Man drawing in millions in revenue from minors. Precedent began to be established for finding that video games were no more expressive than pinball, chess, board- or card-games, or organized sports, and thus could not be considered protected speech. The bulk of these cases declined to grant video games protection under the First Amendment and ruled in favor of the municipalities that their concern about limiting behavior was a more compelling concern at the time. However, these early cases brought into question the potential that video games may be more advanced than just pinball machines due to the virtual worlds they could represent, and as technology advanced, could change the precedence.

The release of Mortal Kombat intensified debate around violence in video games, and the U.S. Congress held hearings in 1993 and 1994 criticizing the industry for lack of a ratings system. The hearings prompted the formation of the Interactive Digital Software Association in 1994 – later renamed as the Entertainment Software Association – and the creation of the Entertainment Software Rating Board (ESRB) to stave off proposed legislation to regulate the industry. While the ESRB system was voluntary, retailers agreed to not sell unrated games or those rated "Adults Only" while restricting sales of "Mature" games to minors.

Despite the ESRB system, several states attempted to create laws that enforced the ESRB ratings on the basis that violent video games were harmful to minors. A series of cases at federal district and circuit courts starting in 2000 which challenged these ordinances and restrictions began an alteration of precedent of the nature of expression of video games. In these cases, the courts identified two elements of video games; that they were expressive works that had the potential to be protected by the First Amendment, and that under review using the Miller test, video games were not seen as obscene, and thus were not restricted from being protected works. The Seventh Circuit case American Amusement Machine Ass'n v. Kendrick in 2001 is considered the most definitive basis of the new precedent set by these cases, in which Judge Richard Posner recognized that obscenity, related to sexualized content, was separate from violent content. Posner reasoned that, unlike cases involving obscene content, there was no similar prurient interest to support excluding violent content from First Amendment protection. Applying this reasoning, video games were treated by reviewing courts as protected works under the First Amendment, with decisions generally ruling that ordinances blocking minors from playing or purchasing them were unconstitutional. However, in the absence of Supreme Court precedent, these decisions did not set nationwide standards.

Violence in video games remained a concern for parents, advocates, and lawmakers. Following the "Hot Coffee" discovery in Grand Theft Auto: San Andreas in 2005, and the ESRB's re-rating of The Elder Scrolls IV: Oblivion in 2006, both which revealed sexually explicit content within the game's assets that were only viewable with mods, new federal and state laws were proposed to further enforce the ESRB's system as well as to mandate processes for the ESRB. Other states passed laws to enforce sales of games based on the ESRB ratings, most designed to prevent sales of games rated "Mature" to minors by fining retailer. Video game industry trade groups sued to block these laws, generally succeeding based on similar precedence from the early 2000 cases that video games, even violent ones, were protected speech.

In 2011's Brown v. Entertainment Merchants Association, which was based on a similar law in California to block the sales of mature video games to minors, the United States Supreme Court ruled that games are entitled to First Amendment protection, with the majority opinion reading, "Like the protected books, plays, and movies that preceded them, video games communicate ideas—and even social messages—through many familiar literary devices (such as characters, dialogue, plot, and music) and through features distinctive to the medium (such as the player's interaction with the virtual world). That suffices to confer First Amendment protection."

=== Theory of legitimization ===
Emerging art forms depend upon existing communities for recognition and legitimization, even as they compete with those incumbents for ideological and material support. Games have faced suspicion from critics of established media, just as film, television, and comics were once doubted. Keith Stewart, games editor for The Guardian, sees mainstream media as preferring to approach games from the angle of the human stories surrounding them – making indie games with identifiable creators attractive to journalists. Critical communities devoted to games have likewise embraced auteur theory of games' artistic potential as underpinned by the creative visions of sole creators. John Lanchester of the London Review of Books noted that even as video games become a larger market by revenues compared to films and books, the amount of attention given to video games is generally delegated to a limited set of sources and do not readily enter the "cultural discourse".

Auteur theory has led to some overlap between indie status and artistic cachet, with critics praising stylistic choices in indie games, when those same choices would be deplored in a commercial game. Rather than defending the medium as a whole, proponents of art games attempt to create a separate milieu opposed to video games they accept to be low culture. In practice, indie auteurs often receive commercial backing, while mainstream creators such as Shigeru Miyamoto and Peter Molyneux are increasingly viewed as auteurs as well. The conflation of indieness and artistry has been criticized by some, including Anna Anthropy, Lucy Kellaway, and Jim Munroe, who argue the characteristics that distinguish indie games from the mainstream are not inherently artistic.

Munroe suggested that video games often face a double standard in that if they conform to traditional notions of the game as a toy for children then they are flippantly dismissed as trivial and non-artistic, but if they push the envelope by introducing serious adult themes into games then they face negative criticism and controversy for failing to conform to the very standards of non-artistic triviality demanded by these traditional notions. He further explained games as a type of art more akin to architecture, in which the artist creates a space for the audience to experience on their own terms, than to a non-interactive presentation as in cinema.

Video game designer Kim Swift believes games can be artistic but denies that they need to be art in order to have cultural value. She feels video games should aspire to be toys through which adults can exercise their imaginations.

=== Roger Ebert on video games as art ===
The question rose to wide public attention in the mid-2000s when film critic Roger Ebert participated in a series of controversial debates and published colloquies. In 2005, following an online discussion concerning whether or not knowledge of the game Doom was essential to a proper appreciation of the film Doom (which Ebert had awarded one star) as a commentary on the game, Ebert described video games as a non-artistic medium incomparable to the more established art forms:

To my knowledge, no one in or out of the field has ever been able to cite a game worthy of comparison with the great dramatists, poets, filmmakers, novelists and composers. That a game can aspire to artistic importance as a visual experience, I accept. But for most gamers, video games represent a loss of those precious hours we have available to make ourselves more cultured, civilized and empathetic.

— Roger Ebert

In 2006, Ebert took part in a panel discussion at the Conference on World Affairs entitled "An Epic Debate: Are Video Games an Art Form?" in which he stated that video games do not explore the meaning of being human as other art forms do. A year later, in response to comments from Clive Barker on the panel discussion, Ebert further noted that video games present a malleability that would otherwise ruin other forms of art. As an example, Ebert posed the idea of a version of Romeo and Juliet that would allow for an optional happy ending. Such an option, according to Ebert, would weaken the artistic expression of the original work. In April 2010, Ebert published an essay, dissecting a presentation made by Kellee Santiago of thatgamecompany at the 2009 Technology Entertainment Design Conference, where he again claimed that games can never be art, due to their rules and goal-based interactivity.

One obvious difference between art and games is that you can win a game. It has rules, points, objectives, and an outcome. Santiago might cite [an] immersive game without points or rules, but I would say then it ceases to be a game and becomes a representation of a story, a novel, a play, dance, a film. Those are things you cannot win; you can only experience them.

— Roger Ebert

Ebert's essay was strongly criticized by the gaming community, including Santiago herself, who believes that video games as artistic media are only at their infancy, similar to prehistoric cave paintings. Ebert later amended his comments in 2010, conceding that games may indeed be art in a non-traditional sense, that he had enjoyed playing Cosmology of Kyoto, and addressing some replies to his original arguments.

Although Ebert did not engage with the issue again and his view remains mired in controversy, the notion that video games are ineligible to be considered fine art due to their commercial appeal and structure as choice-driven narratives has proved persuasive for many including video game luminary Brian Moriarty, who in March 2011 gave a lecture on the topic entitled An Apology For Roger Ebert. In this lecture Moriarty emphasized that video games are merely an extension of traditional rule-based games and that there has been no call to declare games like Chess and Go to be art. He went on to argue that art in the sense that Romantics like Ebert, Schopenhauer, and he were concerned with (i.e. fine art or sublime art) is exceptionally rare and that Ebert was being consistent by declaring video games to be without artistic merit in as much as Ebert had previously claimed that "hardly any movies are art". Moriarty decried the modern expansion of the definition of art to include low art, comparing video games to kitsch and describing aesthetic appreciation of video games as camp. After addressing the corrupting influence of commercial forces in indie games and the difficulty of setting out to create art given the "slippery" tools that game designers must work with, Moriarty concluded that ultimately it was that player choices were presented in games that structurally invalidated the application of the term "art" to video games as the audience's interaction with the work wrests control from the author and thereby negates the expression of art. This lecture was in turn criticized sharply by noted video game designer Zach Gage.

=== Other critics ===
In a 2006 interview with US Official PlayStation 2 Magazine, game designer Hideo Kojima agreed with Ebert's assessment that video games are not art. Kojima acknowledged that games may contain artwork, but he stressed the intrinsically popular nature of video games in contrast to the niche interests served by art. Since the highest ideal of all video games is to achieve 100% player satisfaction whereas art is targeted to at least one person, Kojima argued that video game creation is more of a service than an artistic endeavor.

At the 2010 Art History of Games conference, Michael Samyn and Auriea Harvey (founding members of indie studio Tale of Tales), argued in no uncertain terms that games "are not art" and that they are by and large "a waste of time". Central to Tale of Tales' distinction between games and art is the purposive nature of games as opposed to art: Whereas humans possess a biological need that is only satisfied by play, argues Samyn, and as play has manifested itself in the form of games, games represent nothing more than a physiological necessity. Art, on the other hand, is not created out of a physical need but rather it represents a search for higher purposes. Thus the fact that a game acts to fulfill the physical needs of the player is sufficient, according to Samyn, to disqualify it as art.

Gamers were surprised by this controversial stance due to the frequency of prior third-party characterizations of Tale of Tales' productions as "art games", however Tale of Tales clarified that the games they were making simply expanded the conception of games. The characterization of their games as "art games", noted Samyn, was merely a byproduct of the imaginative stagnation and lack of progressivism in the video game industry. While Tale of Tales acknowledged that old media featuring one-way communication was not enough, and that two-way communication via computers offers the way forward for art, the studio argued that such communication today is being held hostage by the video game industry. To enable and foment this futuristic two-way art, suggests Tale of Tales, the concept of "the game" must be eviscerated by games that do not fit within the current paradigm and then "life must be breathed into the carcass" through the creation of artworks Samyn and Harvey refer to as "not games".

In 2011, Samyn further refined his argument that games are not art by emphasizing the fact that games are systematic and rule-based. Samyn identified an industry emphasis on gameplay mechanics as directly responsible for the marginalization of artistic narrative in games and he described modern video games as little more than digital sport. Pointing to systemic problems, Samyn criticized the current model whereby the putative artist must work through a large and highly efficient development team who may not share the artist's vision. However, Samyn does not reject the idea that games, as a medium, can be used to create art. To create art using the medium of the video game Samyn suggests that the artistic message must precede the means of its expression in the guidance of gameplay mechanics, the development of "funness" or economic considerations must cease to guide the work's creation, and the development process must embrace a model wherein a single artist-author's vision gains central primacy.

In 2012, Guardian art critic Jonathan Jones published an article arguing that games are more like a playground and not art. Jones also notes that the nature of creating video games robs "one person's reaction to life" and that "no one owns the game, so there is no artist, and therefore no work of art".

== See also ==
- Classificatory disputes about art
- Artistic freedom
- Video game auteur
- Electronic Language International Festival
- Game canon
- Game Masters, an exhibition at the Australian Centre for the Moving Image that explored key artists and designers of the video game medium
- Game studies
- Interactive art
- Machinima, the use of games for storytelling
- Kokoromi collective
- Playing Columbine, a film that explores the concept of video games as art and the role they play in modern society
- Video game art, artistic expressions using video games as a medium
- Video game development, the process of creating a video game
- Visual novel
