= Art game =

Genre of electronic structured play intended primarily as creative expression

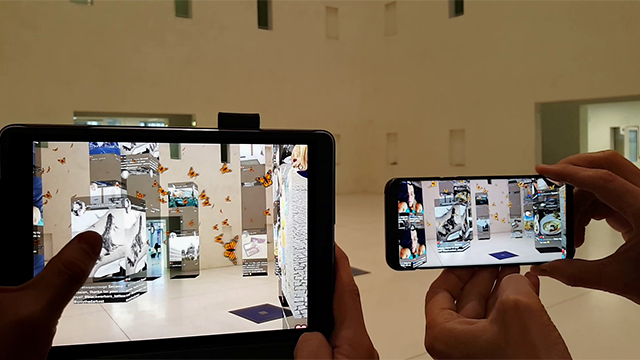
10.000 Moving Cities, Marc Lee, Augmented Reality Multiplayer Game, Art Installation

An art game (or arthouse game) is a work of interactive new media digital software art as well as a member of the "art game" subgenre of the serious video game. The term "art game" was first used academically in 2002 and has come to be understood as describing a video game designed to emphasize form or whose structure is intended to produce some kind of reaction in its audience. Art games are interactive (usually competitive against the computer, self, or other players) and the result of artistic intent by the party offering the piece for consideration. They also typically go out of their way to have a unique, unconventional look, often standing out for aesthetic beauty or complexity in design. The concept has been extended by some art theorists to the realm of modified ("modded") gaming when modifications have been made to existing non-art games to produce graphic results intended to be viewed as an artistic display, as opposed to modifications intended to change game play scenarios or for storytelling. Modified games created for artistic purposes are sometimes referred to as "video game art".

Art games are often considered a means of demonstrating video games as works of art.

== Overview ==
A definition of the art game was first proposed by Tiffany Holmes in her 2003 paper for the Melbourne DAC Conference, "Arcade Classics Spawn Art? Current Trends in the Art Game Genre". Holmes defined the art game as "an interactive work, usually humorous, by a visual artist that does one or more of the following: challenges cultural stereotypes, offers meaningful social or historical critique, or tells a story in a novel manner." The paper stated that an art game must contain at least two of the following: "[1] a defined way to win or experience success in a mental challenge, [2] passage through a series of levels (that may or may not be hierarchical), [3] a central character or icon that represents the player." This definition was narrowed by Rebecca Cannon in an October 2003 paper where she highlighted the competitive, goal-oriented nature of the genre in defining art games as "compris[ing] an entire, (to some degree) playable game... Art games are always interactive—and that interactivity is based on the needs of competing [...] Art games explore the game format primarily as a new mode for structuring narrative, cultural critique." In a 2015 article, Colombian video game theorist Carlos Díaz placed importance on the "reflection experience" as an integral aspect of the art game. This experience can pertain to a variety of cultural avenues, but it transcends the medium and its structure.

Within the topic of the art game, further subdivisions have been proposed. In her 2003 paper, Holmes identified two common art game types as the "feminist art game" (an art game that generates thinking about gender and typecasting), and the "retro-styled art game" (an art game that juxtaposes low-resolution graphics with academic or theoretical content, and that creatively subverts the format of an arcade classic to support a conceptual creative agenda). In 2005, art theorist Pippa Tshabalala née Stalker broadly defined the art game as "a video game, normally PC as opposed to console based, that generally but not exclusively explores social or political issues through the medium of video games." She proposed two different categorical schemes to further subdivide the genre by theme and by type. Subdividing by theme, Stalker defined "aesthetic art games" to include "games that deal with using the game medium to express an artistic purpose," and she defined "political" or "agenda-based art games" as art games that "have some sort of ulterior motive other than aesthetics" and whose basis is in "using the medium of the computer games to bring an issue to the public's, or at least the art world's, attention in order to attract support and understanding for a cause." Subdividing by type, Stalker identified the "art mod", the "physical manifestation art game" (the player is involved physically in the game, often experiencing physical consequences, such as pain, for their actions), "machinima", and "3D real-time [art] game" (an art game that displays all the characteristics of a complete level-based commercial game, both on the programming and commercial side). The identification of art mods and machinima as forms of the art game conflicts with Cannon's definition of the art mod that highlights the non-interactive and non-competitive nature of these forms of media.

Distinctions are drawn in describing the art game as a genre compared to traditional video game genres (such as the platformer or first-person shooter). Rather than describing the game on a surface level, descriptions focus on the artistic intent, as well as the execution and implementation of the gameplay. For instance, Bethesda's 2008 release Fallout 3 is considered to be a role-playing game with first-person shooter elements, but it could also be considered to have elements consistent with art games—it implements moral player choices for the sole purpose of provoking emotion or thought in the player. There are several recent instances of video games that similarly involve the characteristics of art games, such as Braid and Undertale. Games like these aren't necessarily created or marketed under the classification of "art game", but are still created for artistic purposes that transcend their respective structures. The potentials and limitations of the medium are increasingly discovered as the video game industry develops, therefore resulting in the recent popularity of art game elements. If nothing else, the genre can be seen as a means to push the medium to its conceptual limit.

Since the development of these early definitions, art theorists have emphasized the role of artistic intent (of author or curator) and further definitions have emerged from both the art world and the video game world that draw a clear distinction between the "art game" and its predecessor, "video game art". At the core of the matter lies an intersection between art and the video game. Easily confused with its often non-interactive sibling art form video game art, and the concept of video games as an art form (irrespective of artistic intent), the essential position that art games take in relation to video games is analogous with the position that art film takes in relation to film. ACM SIGGRAPH opened an online exhibit "The Aesthetics of Gameplay" in March 2014, featuring 45 independently developed games selected via a nomination process, where the mechanics of gameplay are, in part, tied to the visuals and audio of the game. Greg Garvey, the curator of this exhibit, compared this to the concept of Gesamtkunstwerk where the work attempts to encompass other art forms, though as Garvey comments, the "merger of interaction with the aesthetics" drives these games beyond this concept.

=== "Art game" versus "game art" ===
Due to the contemporaneous improvement of graphic capabilities (and other aspects of game art design) with the trend toward recognition of games as art and the increases in video game art production and art game releases, discussions of these topics are often closely interleaved. This has led to the drawing of a number of critical distinctions between the "art game" and the various kinds of "game art".

In drawing a distinction between games with artistic imagery and art games, commentators have compared the art to sculpture and have emphasized the concept of artistic intent in the creation of the art game. This difference has been described by Justin McElroy of Joystiq as "the same [as that] between a sculpture and a building. Though a building/game can be aesthetically pleasing, an art game/sculpture is using its very structure to produce some kind of reaction." This same comparison has been used by Jenova Chen in an interview discussing art games and the prominence of non-games to the artistic gamer community. Along with expanding on the notion of art games as comparable to architecture in a 2010 interview with Nora Young for Spark, Jim Munroe stated that whereas video games such as the "art game" are shifting in the direction of the "high arts" within the realm of art generally, traditionally video games have occupied a position in the "cultural gutter" (making up the "low arts").

Another key distinction that has been made between art games and games with artistic imagery (and indeed all games viewed as art) is that art games are intended as artistic creations from the outset, whereas traditional games are often commercially motivated and play-oriented. Thus the "game" portion of "game art" is merely the means to an artistic end. This has been expanded by some commentators to include the artistic intention of the curator as well as the original creator.

This distinction also brings into focus the concept of "serious play." In Art Games: Interactivity and the Embodied Gaze (2006), Elizabeth Coulter-Smith (with Graham Coulter-Smith) introduced the concept of "serious play," defining it as "a mode of communication that is not instrumental and not overbearingly focused on the linguistic model," a communicative medium that involves the concrete action of participants rather than abstractions such as language. This has significant implications for games as an artistic medium, as it facilitates communication of meaning through empathetic and embodied interaction. Unlike other media, players of games must invest not only time but effort—in the form of problem-solving or the application of reflexes. This participatory element demonstrates that adding effort as an element in an artwork can result in a higher degree of emotional investment, and therefore a greater potential impact of artistic intent on the participant.

In distinguishing between art games and video game art, the elements of interactivity and often competition (or goals) are frequently emphasized. Because art games are games and because games are interactive, definitions for the art game tend to require interactivity whereas video game art can be either interactive or non-interactive. Beyond this, the questions of whether competition, rules, and goals are intrinsic to games and to what extent "play" is even definable in the context of an art game raise thorny problems for critics who compare a game like chess to a game like Sim City and who question the playfulness of a game like Escape From Woomera. A number of commentators have included the concept of competition as part of the definition of the art game to distinguish it from video game art. An example of such a definition is offered by Professor John Sharp: "Artgames are games in the formal sense of maintaining the experiential and formal characteristics of videogames—rules, game mechanics, goals, etc.—as an expressive form in the same way other artists might use painting, film or literature." Thus game art pieces can be seen to employ traditional (non-art) games as the canvas or artistic medium whereas art games employ the formal qualities of the game as the artistic medium.

=== "Art game" versus "art mod" ===
The idea of a distinction between art games and artistic modifications to existing games is one that several commentators including Rebecca Cannon and Matteo Bittanti have found useful in further discussing the related topics. Using Tiffany Holmes' original definition of the "art game" as a starting point, Cannon emphasized that whereas art games "always comprise an entire, (to some degree) playable game" and may be made from scratch, art mods by definition "always modify or reuse an existing computer game but only rarely include a reward system, and if so, only when of thematic relevance." Likewise, whereas interactivity and playability are defining characteristics of the art game, they are often of no consequence for the art mod.

For Cannon, the nature of a work as a modification is not alone determinative of the question of whether the work is an art game or an art mod. Some modifications are "art games" despite being mods according to her definition. In addressing the potential for confusion on this point, she has stated that at the most basic level, "art games explore the game format primarily as a new mode for structuring narrative and/or cultural critique, whilst art mods employ game media attributes for extensive artistic expressions." Thus, whereas art games explore the game format, art mods explore game media and whereas art mods always exploit existing games, art games often replace them. Fluxus scholar Celia Pearce describes the art mod or "patch" as an "interventional strategy," referencing the Dadaist concept. She argues that the art mod is an example of this pseudo-vandalism involving subversion and reflection within the cultural context of video games.

Other art theorists including Pippa Tshabalala have rejected this narrow definition of the "art game" and have instead adopted a broad definition under the theory that the concept of the game is not limited to systems where the author has created rules and goals, but that games emerge whenever the observer self-limits play experience. Thus, observers experiencing the Jodi art mod, SOD (a modification of Wolfenstein 3D), can experience it as an art game as soon as they decide that their goal will be to progress to the next level.

== History ==
=== Origins and first wave art games ===
The art game genre has emerged most directly from the intersection of commercial culture (specifically commercial video games) and contemporary digital art. In attempting to determine the earliest origins of the genre, however, art theorists including Tiffany Holmes and Greg Costikyan have identified its earliest roots in Dada and the collaborative drawing games of the Surrealist artists of the 1920s. Others have drawn still broader connections to literary games invented by the author for the reader in 19th and 20th century literature. By treating the game as a topic of artistic utility, these earlier art movements legitimized the concept of the game as an artistically explorable form and as more than simply idle amusement.

At the Art History of Games conference in Atlanta, Georgia, Professor Celia Pearce further noted that since the Fluxus movement of the 1960s and Marcel Duchamp's art productions, procedurality has taken a central position in certain forms of art. The artistically motivated imposition of strict rules of creation for an art piece (in this case the restriction by the author to the format or medium of the video game) brought video games and art into a collision resulting in the first true art games. Although early game-like programs such as Conway's zero-player Game of Life (1970) were foundational to later art games, Pearce identifies the earliest true art games as originating in a small wave in the early 1980s with games such as Bernie DeKoven and Jaron Lanier's Alien Garden (1982). Other early art games from this period include Jane Veeder's Warpitout (1982), Lanier's Moondust (1983), and Lynn Hershman Leeson's Laserdisc games LORNA (1983) and Deep Contact (1984). Following this period of activity, art game production would see a lull until the end of the 1990s.

Video games were first displayed in the art museum setting during the 1980s, in retrospective exhibitions like Corcoran Gallery of Art's "ARTcade" (1983) and Museum of the Moving Image's "Hot Circuits: A Video Arcade" (1989). However, just as with the production of art games, the practice became much more common during the late 1990s and early 2000s. Exhibitions like the Walker Art Center's "Beyond Interface" (1998), the online "Synreal" (1998) and "Cracking the Maze – Game Plug-Ins as Hacker Art" (1999), shift e.V.'s "RELOAD" (1999), the UCI Beall Centre's "Shift-Ctrl" (2000), and several others in 2001 were among the first wave of video game exhibitions that popularized the concept. This expanded to exhibitions heavily featuring or exclusive to art game content in the early 2000s with shows like MASS MoCA's "GameShow" (2001) San Francisco MOMA's "010101: Art in Technological Times" (2001), the Whitney Museum's "Bitstreams" (2001), and the New York Museum of the Moving Image's "<ALT> Digital Media" (2003).

=== Rise of the "artist game" ===
Drawing from the modern traditions of the 1970s New Games Movement, where the playing of a game could be regarded as a form of performance art, art pieces such as Frank Lantz' Pac Manhattan, Blast Theory's Can You See Me Now? and similar hybrid performance-art/art-games including Painstation (2001), Go Fish (2001), and Vagamundo (2002) came in the early years of the modern period of art game production. The burgeoning video game art movement also provided direct inspiration for art game development particularly in the creation of art mods. Art theorist Rebecca Cannon identifies the earliest example of a purposeful art mod to be Iimura Takahiko's 1993 AIUEOUNN Six Features (a modification of Sony's "System G"), although the transgressive capability of mods like Castle Smurfenstein (1983) had already been recognized during the first period of art game creation. Online artist collectives including Jodi.org and the Australian SelectParks soon began production of art games in the studio setting, repurposing older games through the use of interactive art mods.

The use of mods within art games became one of the primary tools for art game creators who designed games with a message, such as the addition of female characters to a traditionally male-centric game, or to force the audience to re-examine a familiar work in a different light. Consequently, the early history of art games is intimately connected to the history of commercial video games and the establishment of video gaming conventions, and significant events in the history of video games have corresponding significance to art games. This is true both in terms of the level of technological advancement that make up the substance of art games as well as by providing cultural touchstones (such as the classic arcade games and blockbuster titles from the 1990s like Doom and Myst) that art games may use referentially or as the subject of an homage. Art games of this kind have been defined by theorists as "artist games"—art games created by non-developer contemporary artists rather than by game developers. Typically produced on a smaller budget and with less technical (coding) knowledge than art games emerging from the game scene itself, "artist games" are often more explicit in terms of their artistic ambitions and commonly occupy "the grey area between modification and original game" because they are frequently based on classic arcade titles from the 1980s. Early examples of this kind of game include Thompson and Craighead's Trigger Happy (1998), Esc to Begin's Font Asteroids (1999), and Natalie Bookchin's The Intruder (1999).

As video games became increasingly common as a form of media throughout the 2000s, video games that deemphasized the game portion of the medium (such as serious games, non-games and art games) saw a rise in production. This in turn led to recognition of the game as a vehicle for ideas instead of simply an entertaining diversion. The term "art game" was first used in the scholarly setting by Professor Tiffany Holmes in her 2002 paper, "Art games and Breakout: New media meets the American arcade". Holmes presented this paper at the Computer Games and Digital Cultures conference in Tampere, Finland, and at SIGGRAPH 2002, later expanding it by defining the term in a 2003 paper for the Melbourne DAC Conference. Further refinements to the definition were made by theorist Rebecca Cannon in her late 2003 paper, "Introduction to Artistic Computer Game Modification."

=== Rise of the indie art game ===
Beginning in the early to mid-2000s with games such as Samorost (2003) and The Endless Forest (2005), a strong overlap developed between art games and indie games. This meeting of the art game movement and the indie game movement brought art games to the attention of the video game culture at large, and sparked large debates regarding whether or not video games can be fairly considered as works of art, as well as a backlash against use of the term. These debates have in turn led to the retrospective determination of numerous older commercial video games (prior to the use of the term "art game") as art games. As indie art games have seen a dramatic rise in production in the late 2000s (especially from 2008 and onwards), indie game developers like Jenova Chen, Molleindustria, Jason Nelson, Jason Rohrer, and Tale of Tales have become established and "artist games" have become relatively less common.

Discussions over the commercial viability of art games have led to speculation concerning the potential for the commercial video game industry to fund the development of "prestige games" (games that are unlikely to be commercially successful but whose artistic vision marks them as important to the development of the medium). These considerations are generally regarded as premature, as the concept of "prestige" hasn't yet taken hold for publishers as it has for developers in the nascent industry. Consequently, publishers are generally unwilling to take on commercially risky high-concept games the same way that major film studios (who often have arthouse divisions) might for art films that could enhance their prestige. The need for adequate funding to produce high quality art games has been recognized by art game creators like Florent Deloison and Mark Essen, who in 2011 joined designer game firms where individualized art games can be commissioned as luxury items by art patrons for a substantial price.

== Criticism of the term "art game" ==
Alongside the growing use of the term "art game", numerous members of the video game culture have reacted negatively to its application. Critics have noted that the term turns away a certain segment of the gamer population who reject the notion that games can be works of art, and who equate "art games" with elitist gaming. This kind of reaction has in turn caused some game developers to reject the use of the term to describe their games, instead using terms like "not-game", "un-game", or simply refusing to accept any categorical label for their work. Some common criticisms of the term include:

- A view from some within the gaming community that describing a game as an art game means that it is pretentious and not fun.
- A view that those who play and enjoy art games (known as "art gamers") are snobby and not to be emulated.
- A view that the term "art game" needlessly introduces the distinction between high art and low art within video games where it has never existed previously.
- A view that the term "art game" is over-broad and that it is incorrectly used synonymously with "indie game" thereby improperly co-opting the concept of innovation when innovation itself is not art.
- The idea that the term "art game" implies an exclusive claim to artistry within the medium of the video game and that art games are therefore superior to other forms.
- The idea that works today labeled as "art games" lack the formal properties to properly be called games or art at all.

== See also ==
- Art film
- Auteur theory
- Computer art
- Game studies
- Glitch art
- Video games as an art form
- Video game art
