= Alice: An Interactive Museum =

1991 video game

- The box art for Alice: An Interactive Museum
- Developers: Synergy Inc. Toshiba EMI Ltd
- Publisher: Synergy Interactive Corp.
- Designer: Haruhiko Shono
- Artists: Kuniyoshi Kaneko; Kusakabe Minoru
- Composer: Kazuhiko Katō
- Platforms: Windows 3.x, Macintosh
- Release: 1991
- Genre: Adventure
- Mode: Single-player

Alice: An Interactive Museum is a 1991 point-and-click adventure game, developed by Toshiba-EMI Ltd and directed by Haruhiko Shono. It uses elements and ideas inspired by Lewis Carroll's Alice's Adventures in Wonderland, and pioneered the use of pre-rendered 3D computer graphics, being released two years before 1993's highly notable The Journeyman Project and Myst. It was initially designed for Mac computers and later released for the Windows 3.x and Windows 95 platform. In 1991, Shono won the Minister of International Trade and Industry's AVA Multimedia Grand Prix Award (AVAマルチメディアグランプリ 通産大臣賞を受賞) for the game, and in 1995, Newsweek coined the term "cybergame" to describe games such as Alice and Shono's second game, L-Zone. They were followed by Shono's third title, Gadget: Invention, Travel, & Adventure, in 1993.

== Plot ==
The player wanders through a mansion of twelve rooms including a gallery, an atelier, a wine cellar and a photo studio. Each room is interconnected via halls, doors, and secret passages - one of which leads to the outside world. The player must collect all of the cards missing from a 53-card set of playing cards and then decipher the associated clues that appear on the cards. Correctly solving the puzzle will lead to The Last Room and the end game. The artwork on the walls is very interactive resulting in clues or surprises.

== Production ==
Alice was developed with MacroMind Director and Ray Dream Designer. With music by Kazuhiko Katō, and artwork by Kuniyoshi Kaneko, the game has been noted as an ambitiously artistic piece of software.

== Reception ==
Computer Gaming World in 1993 called Alice "like some kind of charmingly weird and elusive scavenger hunt where one is never really quite sure where they may be going or what they are looking for". The magazine praised the art as "a very elegant and richly rendered environment that makes it a browser's paradise", comparing it to the René Magritte's surrealism. It recommended Alice to those interested in a "surreal 'electronic toy'", not a CD-ROM game.

Shono was heralded as a pioneer by America's Newsweek and Japan's Ministry of International Trade and Industry. Following the sleeper success of Shono's third title Gadget: Invention, Travel, & Adventure (1993), Alice and L-Zone were re-released in America.
