= Kazuhiko Katō =

Japanese musician (1947–2009)

- Katō in 2008

Background information
- Born: March 21, 1947; Fushimi-ku, Kyoto, Japan
- Died: October 17, 2009 (aged 62) Karuizawa, Nagano, Japan
- Genres: Folk, pop, rock, psychedelia
- Occupations: Record producer, composer, and singer
- Years active: 1967–2009

Kazuhiko Katō (加藤 和彦, Katō Kazuhiko; March 21, 1947 – October 17, 2009), nicknamed "Tonovan" (トノヴァン), was a Japanese record producer, songwriter and singer. He sometimes used the spelling of "Kazuhiko Katoh".

== History ==
As a member of the Folk Crusaders, Katō launched his recording career in the mid-1960s. "Kaettekita Yopparai (I Only Live Twice)", their psychedelic debut song composed by Katō and released in 1967, sold more than 1.3 million copies in Japan, and became one of the best-selling singles of the early Japanese popular music industry. The group also starred in director Nagisa Oshima's 1968 film Kaette kita yopparai (alternately known as Sinner in Paradise or Three Resurrected Drunkards).

After the breakup of Folk Crusaders in 1970, Katō gained success for his production works for other musicians, including Shigeru Izumiya, Mariya Takeuchi, and Takuro Yoshida. In particular, Sadistic Mika Band, the acclaimed project he started with his first wife Mika Fukui, received international success. Their 1974 album entitled Kurofune (Black Ship) is regarded as one of the most significant Japanese rock albums of the mid-1970s. The group was disbanded and reassembled again several times, with new vocalists such as Yumi Matsutoya, Karen Kirishima, and Kaela Kimura.

As a composer, Katō wrote the theme song "Ai Oboete Imasu ka" for the anime film Macross: Do You Remember Love?, which was released during the summer of 1984 in Japan. He later formed a songwriting team with his second wife, the late Kazumi Yasui. Most of the songs they wrote were recorded and produced by Kenji Sawada. In 1990, Katō teamed up with graphic artists, Haruhiko Shono and Kuniyoshi Kaneko, to provide the music for the award-winning Japanese computer game, Alice.

In March 2008, Katō formed the rock band Vitamin-Q with Masami Tsuchiya, Gota Yashiki, Rei Ohara and Anza.

== Death ==
Katō committed suicide by hanging on October 17, 2009, at a hotel in Karuizawa, Kitasaku District, Nagano Prefecture, Japan. Police discovered a suicide note in his hotel room.

== Albums ==
All but それから先のことは and あの頃、マリー・ローランサン originally titled in English/romaji.

- ぼくのそばにおいでよ (Come To My Bedside) (1969)
- スーパー・ガス (Super Gas) (1971)
- それから先のことは (Then What Lies Ahead) (1976)
- ガーディニア (Gardenia) (1978)
- パパ・ヘミングウェイ (Papa Hemingway) (1979)
- うたかたのオペラ (1980) (L'Opéra Fragile")
- ベル・エキセントリック (Belle Excentrique) (1981)
- あの頃、マリー・ローランサン (Back Then, Marie Laurencin) (1983)
- ヴェネチア (Venèzia) (1984)
- マルタの鷹 (The Maltese Falcon) (1987)
- ボレロ・カリフォルニア (California Bolero) (1991)
