= Bernie De Koven =

American game designer

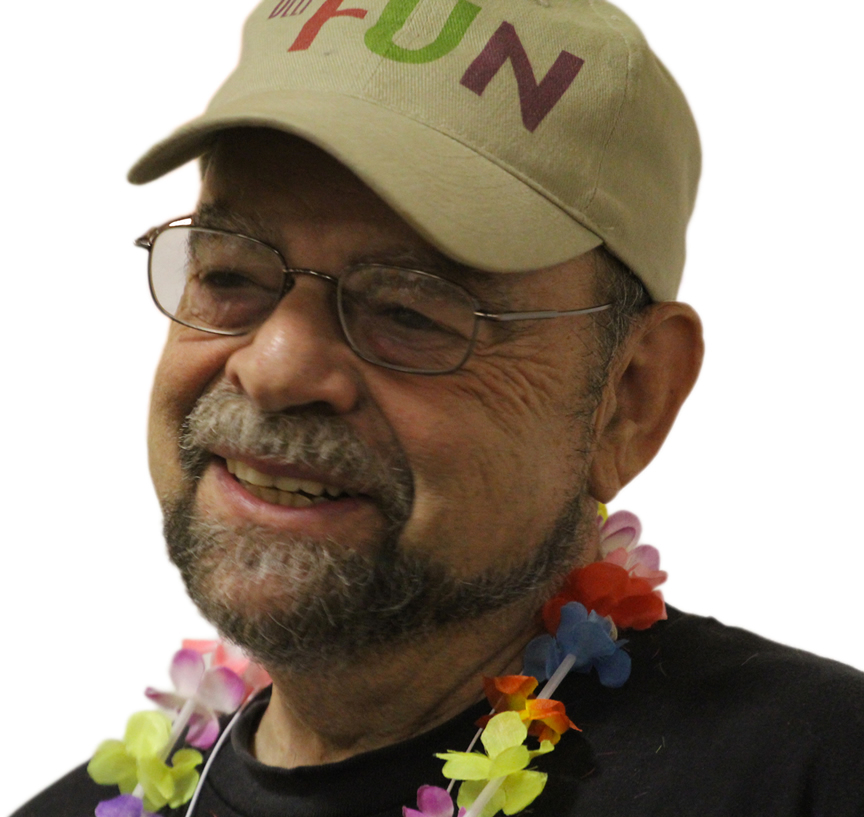
- Born: Bernard Louis De Koven; October 15, 1941; Appleton, Wisconsin, U.S.
- Died: March 24, 2018 (aged 76)
- Education: Villanova University
- Occupations: Game designer, writer, humorist, fun theorist
- Spouse: Rosanne "Rocky" Friedlander (m. 1966)
- Children: Shael, Elyon Avram Micah
- Writing career
- Pen name: Major Fun, General Fun
- Period: 1967–2018
- Notable work: The Well Played Game
- Notable awards: 1967 Rockefeller Fellowship (playwriting); 2006 Iffil-Raynolds award
- Website: www.deepfun.com

Bernard Louis De Koven or DeKoven (October 15, 1941 – March 24, 2018) was an American game designer, author, lecturer and fun theorist. He is most notable for his book The Well Played Game, for his contributions to the New Games Foundation, his pioneering work in computer game design, and for his long-running web site, deepFUN.com.

== Career ==
In 1968, De Koven began work on his Interplay Curriculum for the School District of Philadelphia. The curriculum was published in 1971, and a second edition printed in 1974.

In 1971, De Koven and his family established The Games Preserve, a retreat center for the study of games and play located in Eastern Pennsylvania.

In 1975, De Koven first became involved with the New Games Foundation.

In 1976, De Koven designed Playday on the Parkway for the city of Philadelphia - the culminating event in Philadelphia's Bicentennial celebration.

In 1978, De Koven authored The Well-Played Game, which BYTE later called "wonderful ... a must for prospective game designers". In 1982, BYTE's reviewer called his strategy game Ricochet (coauthored with Jeff Connelly and published by Automated Simulations) "easily the most original game I've seen this year ... a game-player's delight", and stated that it "expresses many of the ideals" of The Well-Played Game. That year De Koven was interviewed by InfoWorld magazine concerning the future of computer gaming; he accurately predicted the advent of games using motion control similar to the Kinect, as well as app store and related game distribution systems, stating that networking "will greatly increase the availability of games. Instead of having to buy each game, users will be able to download more and more complex games as networks become more popular."

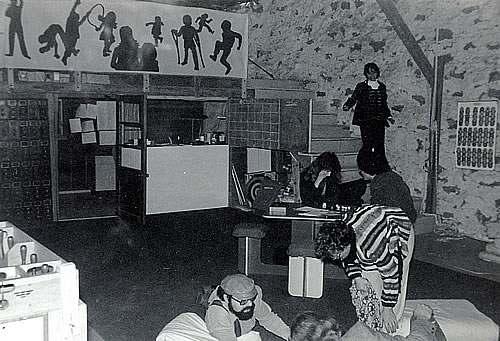
Bernie De Koven's Games Preserve circa 1976. De Koven is pictured in the center foreground.

Katie Salen and Eric Zimmerman, in their 2003 game design textbook Rules of Play: Game Design Fundamentals, extensively reference De Koven's The Well-Played Game.

Christopher Noxon's interview of De Koven was featured in the 2006 book Rejuvenile. His role as a professional "fun coach" is emphasized, as is De Koven's involvement with the New Games Movement of the mid-1970s, and his later work with the Esalen Institute in California.

De Koven has worked with major toy and game manufacturers to design and develop new products. Notably, he has partnered with LEGO on the development of their LEGO Game System. Additionally, De Koven has designed award-winning games for Ideal Toy Company, Children's Television Workshop, CBS Software and Mattel Toys.

In September 2011, De Koven was a keynote speaker at the 2011 Digital Games Research Association Conference ("Think Design Play"). His talk, "Playing Well Together," described some of the underlying principles of New Games and his book, The Well-Played Game.

De Koven was a lifetime member of The Association for the Study of Play.

In spring of 2017, De Koven notified his blog followers that he had terminal cancer and only about one year left to live, asking them to spread the joy of play.

He died of cancer on 24 March 2018 at the age of 76.

== Awards ==
- 2006 Ifill-Raynolds award for "outstanding achievement in the field of fun" from the North American Simulation and Gaming Association

== Books / publications ==
- Interplay: a curriculum for elementary school children, Office of Policy Planning and Development, School District of Philadelphia, 1971 (OCLC 9095130)
- "The Play Community" in The New Games Book, 1976 (ISBN 0-385-12516-X)
- The Well-Played Game, 1978, updated edition 2002 (ISBN 978-0595217908), MIT Press edition August, 2013 (ISBN 978-0262019170)
- Connected Executives: A Strategic Communications Plan, 1986 (ISBN 978-0962583407)
- Junkyard Sports, 2004 (ISBN 978-0736052078)
- Great Games for Big Activity Balls (with Todd Strong), 2009 (ISBN 978-0736074810)
- A Playful Path, 2013 (ISBN 978-1490333816)
- The Infinite Playground, 2020, with Celia Pearce and Holly Gramazio (editors), (ISBN 0262044072)

== Games and interactive media ==
- Ricochet (1981): one of the first abstract strategy games for computers by Automated Simulations (designer), E. Connelley, programmer
- Alien Garden (1982): one of the first computer art games. Released by Automated Simulations. (designer; programmed by Jaron Lanier)(Video on YouTube)
- Light Waves (1984): computer game by Children's Computer Workshop (designer; prototype by Dave Winer)
- Junkyard Games (2008) business simulation game published by HRDQ (designer; manual by Ron Roberts)
