= Tetsujin =

Tetsujin (鉄人) means "iron man" in Japanese. It may refer to:

== People ==
- Kenta Kobashi (born 1967), a Japanese retired professional wrestler
- Andy Hug (1964–2000), a Swiss muay thai, kyokushinkai and K-1 fighter
- Terao Tsunefumi (1963 - 2023), a Japanese professional sumo wrestler

== Television ==
- Tetsujin Tiger Seven, a 1973 television series produced by P Productions
- Uchuu Tetsujin Kyodain, a 1976 television series created by Shotaro Ishinomori and Toei Company
- Daitetsujin 17, a 1977 television series created by Shotaro Ishinomori and Toei Company
- Iron Chef (Ryori no Tetsujin), a 1999 cooking show created by Fuji Television

== Video gaming ==
- Iron Angel of the Apocalypse, a 1994 video game released as Tetsujin in Japan
- Tetsujin (Tekken), a fictional character in the Tekken video game series
- PC-FX, a video game console from NEC based on 32-bit "Tetsujin" architecture

== Other uses ==
- Tetsujin 28-go, a 1956 comic book written and illustrated by Mitsuteru Yokoyama
- "Tetsujin", a track by Juno Reactor and Don Davis for The Matrix Revolutions, available on its soundtrack album

== See also ==
- Tatsujin, a 1988 video game
