= Synergy Inc. =

Japanese video game company

- Native name: 株式会社 シナジー幾何学
- Romanized name: Kabushiki gaisha Shinajī Ikunangaku
- Type: Kabushiki gaisha
- Industry: Video games
- Founded: July 24, 1986; 40 years ago
- Defunct: Unknown
- Headquarters: Tokyo, Japan
- Key people: Haruhiko Shono
- Products: Alice: An Interactive Museum; L-Zone; Gadget: Invention, Travel & Adventure; Iron Angel of the Apocalypse
- Number of employees: 30 (as of February 1, 1997)
- Website: www.synergy-j.co.jp (archived)

Synergy Inc., which went by the trade name Synergy Geometry Co., Ltd., was a Japanese video game developer and publisher headquartered in Shinjuku-ku, Tokyo. The company is best known for its point-and-click adventure games, which employed pre-rendered 3D computer graphics, including Alice: An Interactive Museum (1991) and Gadget: Invention, Travel & Adventure (1993), both of which were designed by Haruhiko Shono.

The company also had an American branch named Synergy Interactive Co., based in San Mateo, California, which focused on video game localization, publishing and marketing for western audiences.

== List of games ==
Year	Title	Publisher	Platform
1991	Refixion	Synergy Inc.	Macintosh
1991	Alice: An Interactive Museum	Toshiba-EMI	Macintosh, Microsoft Windows
1992	L-Zone	Synergy Inc. (Japan); Synergy Interactive Co. (USA)	Apple Pippin, Macintosh, PC-98, Microsoft Windows
1992	Refixion II: Museum or Hospital	Synergy Inc.	Macintosh
1992	Refixion III: The Reindeer Story	Synergy Inc.	Macintosh
1993	Gadget: Invention, Travel & Adventure	Toshiba-EMI (Japan); Synergy Interactive Co. (USA)	Apple Pippin, FM Towns, Macintosh, Microsoft Windows
1994	Zeddas: Servant of Sheol (Note: Developed by Caravan Interactive)	Synergy Inc. (Japan); Synergy Interactive Co. (USA)	Macintosh, Microsoft Windows
1994	Iron Angel of the Apocalypse	Synergy Inc. (Japan); Synergy Interactive Co. (USA)	3DO
1995	Four-Sight	Synergy Inc.	Macintosh, Microsoft Windows
1995	Iron Angel of the Apocalypse: The Return	Synergy Inc. (Japan); Synergy Interactive Co. (USA)	3DO, Microsoft Windows
1995	Yellow Brick Road	Synergy Inc. (Japan); Acclaim Japan Ltd. (PS1, SS); Synergy Interactive Co. (USA)	Apple Pippin, Macintosh, Microsoft Windows, PlayStation, Sega Saturn
1996	Yellow Brick Road II: Glinda to Nishi no Majo	Synergy Inc.	Apple Pippin, Macintosh, Microsoft Windows
1997	Yellow Brick Road: Harapeko Tsuki To Hoshi Atsume	Synergy Inc.	Macintosh, Microsoft Windows
1997	Gadget: Past as Future	Synergy Inc. (Japan); Cryo Interactive Entertainment (Europe)	Macintosh. Microsoft Windows, PlayStation
1997	Preview & Reprise	Synergy Inc.	Macintosh, Microsoft Windows

== Cancelled projects ==
=== Underworld: The Sands of Time ===
"Underworld: The Sands of Time" Key Art (1997).

Underworld: The Sands of Time, originally announced under the tentative title of The Underground, was a point-and-click interactive movie directed by Haruhiko Shono, following the development of Gadget: Past as Future. A roughly 5 minute sneak peek for the game was included in Preview & Reprise, an interactive CD-ROM released on November 27, 1997.

=== Woodcutters from Fiery Ships ===
Woodcutters from Fiery Ships was announced in early 1998 as a collaboration between Synergy Inc. and David Lynch's interactive company SubStation, with a tentative release window of Fall 1999. In the press release, Lynch said: "I saw the work that Synergy did on Gadget – the way that the game delivered an immersive experience to the user. By collaborating with Synergy, I look forward to Woodcutters From Fiery Ships expanding existing forms in terms of story, characters and environment. I hope we will give people totally unexpected experiences."

In a November 1999 interview with The Guardian, Lynch stated that the project was "blocked from the get-go", as it was going to be "completely boring to game buffs".
