= Portable Island: Te no Hira no Resort =

2006 video game

- Developer(s): Bandai Namco Games
- Publisher(s): Bandai Namco Games
- Platform(s): PlayStation Portable
- Release: JP: July 30, 2006
- Genre(s): Simulation, Non-game
- Mode(s): Single-player

Portable Island: Te no Hira no Resort (ポータブルアイランド 手のひらのリゾート, Pōtaburu Airando Te no Hira Rizōto, Portable Island: Palm Resort) is a game for the PlayStation Portable handheld system. It was shown at Sony's PlayStation Meeting on the 22 July 2005. It involves the player spending time on a tropical island. The game's clock is based on the PSP's internal clock, so if its day in the real world it will be day in the game world and if its night time it will be night time in the game. Other features include an alarm clock and also interaction with the objects in the game. For example, if the player character picks up a ukulele on the beach, the PSP can then be used as a ukulele with the buttons being the chords and the analog pad is used to strum.
