= Gadget: Invention, Travel, & Adventure =

1993 video game

- Developer: Synergy Inc.
- Publishers: Toshiba-EMI; Synergy Interactive; Cryo Interactive Entertainment; NTT Resonant (iOS)
- Designers: Haruhiko Shono; Hirokazu Nabekura
- Artists: Haruhiko Shono; Minoru Kusakabe; Isao Konaka
- Engine: Macromedia Director; Proprietary (PlayStation, iOS)
- Platforms: FM Towns; Mac OS; Microsoft Windows; Apple Pippin; PlayStation iOS
- Release: November 1993: Gadget: Invention, Travel, & Adventure; FM Towns; JP: November 1993 Mac OS; JP: 28 November 1993; NA: 1994 Microsoft Windows; NA: 1994; JP: 1995 Apple Pippin; JP: 1996 Gadget: Past as Future; Mac OS, Microsoft Windows; JP: 27 November 1997; EU: 1998 PlayStation; JP: 27 November 1997 iGadget; iOS; WW: 23 March 2011
- Genres: Adventure, interactive movie
- Mode: Single-player

Gadget: Invention, Travel, & Adventure (or Gadget: Past as Future) is an adventure game designed by Haruhiko Shono and first released by Synergy Interactive in 1993, following his earlier works Alice: An Interactive Museum (1991) and L-Zone (1992). Like Shono's earlier titles, Gadget uses pre-rendered 3D computer graphics and resembles a point-and-click adventure game similar to Myst (1993), but with a strictly linear storyline culminating in a fixed finale. It thus sometimes tends to be classified more as an interactive movie rather than a video game.

The story centers around a future dominated by retro technology from the 1920s and 1930s, especially streamlined locomotives and flying machines. The game received praise upon release.

== Plot ==
Screenshot from shortly after the start of the game.

The game's plot takes place in an unspecified (albeit vaguely Eastern European) nation headed by the dictator Orlovsky. The protagonist is a government agent tasked with discovering the whereabouts of a missing scientist named Horselover Frost. He begins his quest in a third-floor room of a luxury hotel (which is in fact the headquarters of the government's intelligence arm). After collecting his belongings in a suitcase, the protagonist takes an elevator ride to the lobby, during which a boy replaces the case with another identical one containing various spy-related paraphernalia. In the lobby, the government's intelligence chief briefs the protagonist on his mission. The protagonist then moves to the central railway station. From this point on all the events of the story take place on trains or at the various stations (which include the national science institute) along the nation's main rail line. The player must engage in scripted conversations with various individuals, each of whom reveals pieces of information that advance the protagonist in his quest.

== Release ==
The game was originally released on one Compact Disc in 1993 by Synergy Interactive, based in Tokyo, Japan. A special edition of the game, Gadget: Past as Future, was later released on four CDs in 1997 by Cryo Interactive for Windows, Macintosh, and the PlayStation home console. A remastered version of Gadget: Past as Future was released for iOS by NTT Resonant Inc. in March 2011.

== Reception ==
Gadget was reviewed in 1994 in Dragon #212 by Ken Rolston in the "Eye of the Monitor" column, who gave it a positive review. Stewart Cheifet of Computer Chronicles in 1995 said that it was "captivating in the same way that Myst draws you in". In 1996, Billboard described the game as a sleeper success and noted that it had attracted a cult following in America, leading to the re-release of earlier Shono titles Alice: An Interactive Museum and L-Zone. Shono was heralded as a pioneer by America's Newsweek and Japan's Ministry of International Trade and Industry.

Filmmaker David Lynch called Gadget "an immersive experience" and began development on a different game with Synergy Inc. in 1998, though the game never came to fruition. According to Mexican filmmaker Guillermo del Toro (director of Hellboy and Pan's Labyrinth), Gadget was influential on films like Dark City and The Matrix. Del Toro mentioned Gadget as one of his favorite games, along with Cosmology of Kyoto, Asteroids and Galaga.

== Related media ==
A companion volume of additional art and background plot material, Inside Out with Gadget, was available, as well as a DVD entitled Gadget Trips/Mindscapes and an auxiliary CD-ROM containing videos, stills, previews and interactive 3D models under the title 'Preview and Reprise'.

=== The Third Force: A Novel of Gadget ===
A tie-in novel titled The Third Force: A Novel of Gadget, written by author Marc Laidlaw, was released in 1996. He travelled to Tokyo to work with Synergy on the novel. This influenced his decision to pursue video game writing. He used a number of ideas from the novel when he later wrote the computer game Half-Life (1998), the world of which he viewed as a spiritual successor to the world of Gadget. Laidlaw wrote about the connections between Gadget and Half-Life:

The main character is Elena Hausmann, and for a while our Judith Mossman was actually called Elena Mossman until I realized it was probably too similar to be healthy. The xen crystal (and the name Xen itself) has its origin in The Third Force (where much is made of the mysterious orange crystal known as xenium), and the G-Man is sort of weirdly/interdimensionally related to a very similar kind of character known, in the Gadget universe, as Slowslop. His relationship with Elena is kind of similar to the G-Man's relationship with Alyx Vance. Maybe there are more connections there...oh, well, Gadget has a science team, it's all about them. It's a book I had a ton of fun writing, and you don't need to have played Gadget to read it...they wanted something that stood on its own as a creation in the Gadget universe. I think some of the Japanese fans recognized the connection between Half-Life and Gadget a long time ago, but it has been sort of overlooked here. In my mind the two worlds kind of bleed together
