= Into the Pixel =

Video game art exhibition

- Status: Active
- Genre: Video games; Interactive entertainment
- Venue: Los Angeles Convention Center
- Locations: Los Angeles, California
- Country: United States
- Inaugurated: 2004
- Most recent: 2019
- Organizer: Academy of Interactive Arts & Sciences, Entertainment Software Association
- Website: www.intothepixel.com (archived copy)

"Into the Pixel" was an annual art exhibit centered on video game concept artwork, and started in 2004. The exhibit, sponsored by the Academy of Interactive Arts & Sciences (AIAS) and the Entertainment Software Association (ESA), was designed to showcase concept artwork from past and future video games, with sixteen winners selected from a panel of judges from both the field of video games and from art museums. The winners were presented for public display during the annual Electronic Entertainment Expo (May–June), and with subsequent showings at other video game-related exhibitions such as the Penny Arcade Expo. The winning works of art were then later auctioned at the annual D.I.C.E. Summit (February) with the funds put towards a scholarship program. For the 2013 program, more than 200 works were submitted by various artists.

"Into the Pixel" was started in 2004 to coincide with the 10th anniversary of the Electronic Entertainment Expo. The exhibit was designed to help promote the concept of video games as an art form; ESA's Michael Gallagher stated that the creative energy from video game developers "belongs here with film, it belongs here with music" and that "graphics are one of the powerful components that draw people in" to a game.
