= Zeddas: Servant of Sheol =

1994 video game

- Promotional cover art
- Developer: Caravan Interactive
- Publisher: Synergy Inc.
- Directors: Yayoi Yamada; Yoshio Kawasaki
- Producers: Shigeru Kawamata; Taketoshi Kashiwabara
- Designer: Hirokazu Sato
- Programmer: Katsumi Ishida
- Composer: Keiichi Sugiyama
- Series: Zeddas/Horror Tour
- Engine: Macromedia Director
- Platforms: Macintosh, Microsoft Windows, Sega Saturn
- Release: Mac OS/Windows: JP: 1994; NA: February 1996; Saturn: JP: March 29, 1996
- Genre: Graphic adventure
- Mode: Single-player

Zeddas: Servant of Sheol, known as Horror Tour (ホラーツアー, Horā Tsuā) in Japan, is a horror adventure video game developed by Japanese studio Caravan Interactive, and published by Synergy Inc. in 1996 for Macintosh, SEGA Saturn, and Windows 3.x.

== Gameplay ==
Gameplay screenshot

In Zeddas: Servant of Sheol, the player plays as themselves within the second person perspective as a servant to a castle. The player moves around the castle utilizing a set of arrows that allow for movement. The player explores the castle for keys to open locked doors, in attempt to escape.

== Development and release ==
The game was developed using Macromedia Director.

== Reception and legacy ==
Reception

Review scores
Publication	Score
Famitsu	(SS) 5/10, 5/10, 5/10, 4/10
M! Games	(SS) 41%
PC Gamer (US)	(Win) 58%
Computer Player	(Win) 5/10
High Score	(Mac/Win) 80/100
PC Joker	(Win) 44%
Sega Saturn Magazine (JP)	(SS) 6.66/10

Zeddas: Servant of Sheol was met with mixed critical reception from reviewers. PC Joker 'Markus Ziegler deemed it "shitty". Swedish magazine High Score gave it a positive outlook but recommended users writing their own notes when playing, as the game takes time to complete. PC Gamer's T. Liam McDonald noted the game's weird visual elements. PC Game Center, 'Al Giovetti commended on the graphics, campy and unusual character designs, voice acting, film. Hardcore Gaming 101's Tom Davey felt the game put its visual and technological gimmicks over any semblance of gameplay. Inside Mac Games rated the game 3.5 out of 5, calling it " a lavishly animated and rendered fantasy arena with some occasional gauntlets you have to overcome in order to allow you access to marvel at the next incredible scene". The review criticized puzzles that were rarely challenging and sometimes difficult to manipulate, concluding that the game was "at its core [...] a startlingly bland storyline" with mostly mediocre gameplay but beautiful animation and art.

The Japanese Sega Saturn conversion titled Horror Tour was also met with mixed reception from critics. Fan reception was mixed as well; readers of the Japanese Sega Saturn Magazine voted to give the Saturn version a 4.7368 out of 10 score, ranking at the number 870 spot, indicating a middling following.

A sequel was released entitled Horror Tour 2, which was followed by Labyrinthe (1998). The third game in the series was rediscovered in 2018 in a file from a private collector on a forum.
