= Imabikisō =

2007 video game

- Developer: Chunsoft
- Publisher: Sega
- Director: Kojiro Nakashima
- Producer: Jiro Ishii
- Artist: Haruhiko Shono
- Composers: Kōji Ueno; Yuichi Matsuzaki
- Platforms: PlayStation 3, Wii
- Release: PlayStation 3: JP: October 25, 2007; Wii: JP: August 7, 2008; iOS: JP: February 29, 2012
- Genre: Sound novel
- Mode: Single-player

Imabikisō (忌火起草, Imabikisō) is a visual novel developed by Chunsoft and published by Sega for the PlayStation 3. It is the first visual novel to be released on a seventh generation console. It was later released for the Nintendo Wii under the title Imabikisō: Kaimei-hen with additional content. The game imagery consists mostly of static or animated photographs, though live-action clips are scattered throughout.

The game was created under the Sega Chun Project partnership between Chunsoft and Sega.

== Plot ==
"Vision" is a new drug that's hitting the streets of Japan. The drug, allows the users to see visions from a user's perspective while being high, created from a mysterious flower called Imabikisō. Players play a university student named Hiroki Makimura, who gets involved when cases of burned bodies were uncovered by the police, which has something to do with Imabikisō.

== Development ==
Imabikisō was showcased during the TGS 2007 convention where a demo was shown to visitors, portraying the gameplay as a mixture of text-based narration with voiceovers and photography based on real people. The PS3 Dual Shock controllers will rumble during scary moments.

The game script was handled by Yukinori Kitajima with production done by Takashige Ichise.

=== Media ===
==== Playstation 3 ====
The game was released on the PS3 on October 25, 2007.

Additional contents were also made available on the PlayStation Store, these were two extra free of charge chapters.

==== Nintendo Wii ====
The game was released as Imabikisō: Kaimei-hen on August 7, 2008.

==== Joypolis ====
Sega opened an attraction at Tokyo Joypolis on July 21, 2007, which was known as Imabikisō: Taidō-hen.

== Reception ==
Famitsu gave the game a score of 33/40.

The game was reported by Famitsu on the list of Top 20 Best-selling PS3 Games in Japan for 2007 with 39,299 copies sold at the time.
