= Cosmology of Kyoto =

1993 video game

- Developer: Softedge
- Publisher: Yano Electric
- Director: Kazuhiko Komatsu (supervision)
- Producers: Kōichi Mori, Kiso Yoshio, Masaichi Tanaka, Yuri Kawata, Hiroshi Ōnishi
- Designer: Kōichi Mori
- Artists: Kiyoshi Kondo, Kayoko Fujita, Masashi Imanaka, Miho Hayashi
- Writers: Takashi Kawahara (Japanese script), Stephen Suloway (English translation)
- Composer: Yūko Anzai
- Platforms: Mac OS, Microsoft Windows, MS-DOS
- Release: Windows: JP: 1993; NA: July 1, 1995; Mac OS: JP: February 1, 1994; NA: August 1, 1994
- Genres: Adventure game Horror; Educational

Cosmology of Kyoto (京都千年物語, Kyoto Sennen Monogatari; lit. "Kyoto Thousand-Year Monogatari") is an adventure game developed by Softedge and published by Yano Electric. It was released for Japan in 1993, and then in North America, for the Macintosh in 1994 and then for the PC in 1995.

It is a game where the player, from a first-person perspective, explores the ancient city of Heian-kyō (Present-day Kyoto) during 10th–11th century Japan. The game lacks a clear goal, but is instead nonlinear and emphasizes open exploration, giving players the freedom to explore the city and discover many pathways, buildings, situations, stories and secrets. The game deals with historical, horror, religious and educational themes, and features karma and reincarnation gameplay mechanics. Released on CD-ROM, the dialogues in the game are fully voiced in Japanese, with English subtitles in the localized North American version. The game was not a commercial success, but was critically acclaimed and attracted a cult following.

== Gameplay ==
Screenshot of Cosmology of Kyoto gameplay

The game is controlled by clicking hotspots and text options when appropriate. The user also types in sentences, upon occasion. At the start, the player character is created by the player using a character creation system, with the player able to customize what the player character looks like. As the game begins, the player character is born and must take the clothes off a nearby corpse. The game does not have a clear goal, but is instead nonlinear and emphasizes open exploration, giving the player the freedom to explore Kyoto, with many pathways, buildings, situations, stories and secrets to discover throughout the city, including both realistic and supernatural elements. The progress through the city effects a journey through history, with a street map and online guide provided to ancient (and modern) Kyoto at various points through the game. It provides enough freedom to allow for the player to experiment with the game, such as using it as a resource for their own role-playing game campaign, for example.

Screenshot of the Cosmology of Kyoto character creation screen

The game uses karma and reincarnation gameplay mechanics, based on Buddhist concepts of Saṃsāra. During the game, the player will often die after being attacked by evil demons or robbers, and will then go to one of the realms of reincarnation, depending upon the player's conduct in that life. In these Buddhist hells, the player character is tortured in various ways. Once the player escapes hell, they are reborn, as a new character with a new appearance. If the player has too much negative karma, they may be reincarnated as a dog rather than a human. After being reborn, the player must take the clothes from their last body to continue. As the player progresses through the city, new abilities and items are revealed that protect the player from death.

== Plot ==
The game is set in the medieval city of Heian-kyō around the year 1000, during the Heian period of Japanese history. The game lacks an overall plot, but it instead presents fragmented narratives in a non-linear manner, as the player character encounters various non-player characters while wandering the city. These narratives are cross-referenced to an encyclopedia, providing background information as the narratives progress and as the player comes across various characters and locations, with various stories and related information appearing at distinct locations.

Many of the characters in the game are based on real-life characters from the city and their appearances in the game are often loosely based on tales from the Konjaku Monogatarishū. The game deals with religion and philosophy, particularly Buddhism and Buddhist philosophy, as well as myth and legend.

== Development ==
The game was authored using Macromedia Director.

TRIPITAKA 玄奘三蔵求法の旅 (TRIPITAKA Genshōsanzō Guhō no Tabi, lit. "Tripitaka: Xuanzang Sanzo's Dharma-Seeking Journey"), a sequel, was released by 1999. Long considered vaporware or lost media, its existence was only verified to the broader enthusiast community through discovery of the sole publicly known copy by a collector in 2023, subsequently posted online as abandonware in 2025.

== Reception ==
Upon release in North America, the game received wide critical acclaim. However, it was not a commercial success in North America, attracting only a devoted cult following, partly because of its limited production run making it difficult to find and partly because of its slow-paced gameplay.

=== Critical reception ===
In September 1994, a review by film critic Roger Ebert was published in Wired magazine, where he stated the "richness is almost overwhelming", noting "the resources of this game are limitless", that "no two players would have the same experience" and that he had barely "begun to scratch the surface" of the city despite exploring for two weeks. He stated it was "the most beguiling computer game I have encountered, a seamless blend of information, adventure, humor, and imagination" with "the gruesome side-by-side with the divine." He praised the "hauntingly effective" widescreen graphics, the "vivid facial characteristics" of the characters (describing them as "a cross" between "medieval Japanese art" and "modern Japanimation"), and the voices "filled with personality". He concluded it to be "a wonderful game" where there "is the sense, illusory but seductive, that one could wander this world indefinitely." Later in 2010, he mentioned it in a column on whether video games can be art. After previously arguing that video games are categorically not art, he stated, "In my actual experience, I have played Cosmology of Kyoto, which I enormously enjoyed, and Myst, for which I lacked the patience." Cosmology of Kyoto is the only video game that Ebert is known to have reviewed and enjoyed.

In October 1994, Los Angeles Times published a review by David Coller, who described it as an "adventure-cultural-historical game" that is "graphically violent at times," but a "cerebral game" that "in no way resembles Doom or Rebel Assault", stating "you have to throw away your Western ideas about game play". He stated he could not find an ending "even after many hours of play" but praised the graphics and soundscape as "beautiful" and concluded it to be "truly unsettling." Stone Bridge Press founder Peter Goodman also praised the game, stating he had "never gotten to the end of it" but "it sure is beautiful", which Coller agreed with.

In issue 218 (June 1995) of Dragon magazine, it was reviewed by game designer David "Zeb" Cook in the "Eye of the Monitor" column. He described it as "a unique gaming experience" that is part "game, part history lesson, and part software toy," recommending it to players "looking for an adventure game unlike any they've ever seen" as "Cosmology of Kyoto is unlike anything else out there", noting how it departed from other adventure games, such as its lack of a clear goal other than being killed "over and over and over again" and how "you're just an ordinary person" with no special abilities. He described it as "frustrating, flawed, and fascinating", criticizing the slow pace, "limited" interaction, and slow CD-ROM loading times, yet found it "appealing", stating "the wonder of the setting and its approach outweighs these irritations" as there "are too many fascinating things to discover, from haunted houses to backgammon-playing demons" and the reincarnation mechanic gives the game "a certain freedom", enough that the player "could even use it as a resource for" their "own role-playing game" campaign. According to Cook, "Ultimately, Cosmology of Kyoto is best viewed as less a game and more a software toy, one of those things you plug in and fiddle with. Once you forget about winning and indulge your curiosity, the CD-ROM's strength truly shines."

At the AUUG Conference in September 1995, Cosmology of Kyoto was described as "extremely interesting and groundbreaking", for "many aspects" such as the way it presents and cross-references its fragmented narratives in a non-linear way, the Buddhist themes, the way it draws from "the art and literature of Kyoto at about 1000 AD, the simple elegance of the screen design, and the beauty of the water-colour images used throughout."

=== Retrospective reception ===
Retrospectively, the game has also been critically well received. In 2008, video game journalist Jenn Frank retroactively compared it to contemporary survival horror games. She noted Cosmology of Kyoto lacks a "real plot or goal" but considered an "unfairness" to be characteristic of horror with "encounters with ghosts and demons" that are "often random, sudden, inescapable". She concluded it to be an "extremely eerie" and "Memorably frightening game." In 2011, Ryan McSwain of Hardcore Gaming 101 states that it "attempts to be many things", including "a game, an educational tool, and a work of art", concluding that "it manages to be all of these and more." After Ebert mentioned the game on his blog in 2010, Chris Person reviewed the game on Kotaku in 2012, where he described it as an "edu-horror" and "one of the most disturbing" games he had ever played, depicting themes such as poverty, sickness, suffering, and cruelty (such as a scene where a child is beheaded by a nobleman, and scenes depicting torture in hell), and praises the game for the way it expresses its Buddhist themes. Mexican filmmaker Guillermo del Toro mentioned Cosmology of Kyoto as one of his favorite games, along with Gadget: Invention, Travel, & Adventure, Asteroids and Galaga.

== See also ==
- Shin Onigashima (1987)
- Otogirisō (1992)
- Kamaitachi no Yoru (1994)
