= Non-game =

Video game genre

Non-games are a class of software on the border between video games and toys. The term "non-game game" was coined by late Nintendo president Satoru Iwata, who describes it as "a form of entertainment that really doesn't have a winner, or even a real conclusion". Will Wright had previously used the term "software toy" for the same purpose. The main difference between non-games and traditional video games is the lack of structured goals, objectives, and challenges. This allows the player a greater degree of self-expression through freeform play, since they can set up their own goals to achieve. Some genres that have been considered non-games include language-learning software, digital tabletop games, simulation video games, and art games.

== History ==
Non-games have existed since the early days of video games, although there hasn't been a specific term for them. One of the first is Atari Inc.’s 1977 Surround, a two-player snake game for the Atari VCS, which contains a free-form drawing mode called "Video Graffiti." Later examples which were sold as games but present a less structured experience are Alien Garden (Epyx, 1982), Moondust (Creative Software, 1983), Worms? (one of the 1983 launch titles from Electronic Arts), I, Robot (Atari, 1983) which contains an "ungame mode" called "Doodle City," and Jeff Minter's Psychedelia (Llamasoft, 1984), which is an interactive light synthesizer.

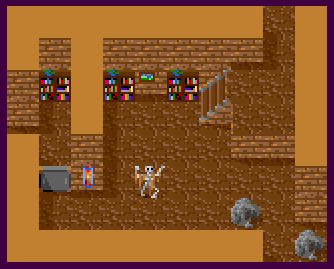
A map created in Adventure Construction Set

Bill Budge's Pinball Construction Set (Electronic Arts, 1983) popularized software where building something is more entertaining than playing the finished product. To a lesser extent, some games became construction sets through the inclusion of level editors, like Doug Smith's Lode Runner (Broderbund, 1983), Ron Rosen's Mr. Robot and His Robot Factory (Datamost, 1983), and John Anderson's Rally Speedway (Adventure International, 1983). Other more proper construction sets followed, such as EA's Adventure Construction Set (1984) and Racing Destruction Set (1985).

In January 1984, Joel Gluck presented a simple toy called Bounce in his game design column in ANALOG Computing. Bounce lets users draw low-resolution lines, then release a block that leaves a trail as it moves across the screen, making patterns as it reflects off of obstacles (other than its own trail). The program is specifically designed not to have goals or scorekeeping, other than what's in the user's head. Bounce was revisited several times in ANALOG, including a version which allows multiple active blocks at once.

The 1989 simulation game SimCity was called a software toy by its creator Will Wright, since there is no ultimate objective in the main game; scenarios with objectives exist in some incarnations of the game, such as SimCity 2000, but these are not the focus.

Non-games have been particularly successful on the Nintendo DS and Wii, where a broad range of Japanese titles have appealed to a growing number of casual gamers. Some examples of non-game genres are: gamified language-learning software for English and Japanese (including one for the memorization of kanji), Go-learning games, puzzle (e. g., Tetris), sandbox (such as Minecraft), as well as simulation, art, and cooking games.

== See also ==
- Falling sand game
- Sandbox game
- Serious game
- Video games as an art form
