= Iron Angel of the Apocalypse: The Return =

1995 video game

- North American 3DO cover art
- Developer: Synergy, Inc.
- Publisher: Synergy Interactive
- Director: Minoru Kusakabe
- Producer: Masanori Awata
- Designers: Yoshitaka Komura; Yukihiro Kuroda
- Programmers: Takakiyo Maruyama; Takeshi Suzuki
- Writer: Jirou Kaneko
- Composer: Norikazu Miura
- Series: Iron Angel of the Apocalypse
- Platforms: 3DO Interactive Multiplayer; Microsoft Windows
- Release: 3DO: JP: 22 September 1995; NA: 22 September 1995; Windows: JP: 19 March 1996
- Genre: First-person shooter
- Mode: Single-player

Iron Angel of the Apocalypse: The Return (Note: Also known as Tetsujin Returns (Japanese: 鉄人リターンズ, Hepburn: Tetsujin Ritānzu) in Japan.) is a video game developed and published by Japanese studio Synergy, Inc. for the 3DO in 1995 and Windows in 1996. It is the sequel to Iron Angel of the Apocalypse.

== Gameplay ==
Iron Angel of the Apocalypse: The Return is a first-person shooter. It is set in a sci-fi futuristic and shooter themes.

== Synopsis ==
The story picks up shortly after the events of the previous game. After his showdown with the Scientist and the Android, Tetsujin finds himself disembodied. A mysterious corporation known as SCR gives Tetsujin a new body, but their plans for Tetsujin are mysterious.

== Reception ==
Reception

Review scores
Publication	Score
GamePro	12/20
Next Generation	2/5

Next Generation reviewed the 3DO version of the game, rating it two stars out of five, and stated that "Having sacrificed a lot of the more bizarre elements that made the original worth playing, the sequel simply doesn't offer enough improvements to make up for the loss."

== Reviews ==
- 3DO Magazine
