= Iron Angel of the Apocalypse =

1994 video game

- North American cover art
- Developer: Synergy, Inc.
- Publishers: JP: Panasonic; NA: Synergy Interactive
- Director: Minoru Kusakabe
- Producer: Masanori Awata
- Designer: Masao Asakawa
- Programmer: Takakiyo Maruyama
- Artists: Hiroyuki Miura; Keisuke Shimada
- Composer: Kyusaku Shimada
- Series: Iron Angel of the Apocalypse
- Platform: 3DO Interactive Multiplayer
- Release: JP: 9 April 1994; NA: 1995
- Genre: First-person shooter
- Mode: Single-player

Iron Angel of the Apocalypse (Note: Also known as Tetsujin (Japanese: 鉄人, Hepburn: Tetsujin) in Japan.) is a video game developed by Synergy, Inc. and published by Panasonic for the 3DO.

== Gameplay ==
Iron Angel of the Apocalypse is a first-person game set in a maze.

== Synopsis ==
In a tower rising high above a desolate city, a mad-genius scientist pursues his experiments. His mission: to create the ultimate killing machine and purge the world! The means of achieving his wild ambition will soon be set in motion. All that remains is the last piece of equipment for Tetsujin... and you (which is the player) have been chosen.

== Development and release ==
Iron Angel of the Apocalypse was developed by Synergy, Inc. The game was first released by Panasonic in Japan as Tetsujin on April 9, 1994, making it one of first titles available for the 3DO Interactive Multiplayer in that region. It was also distributed in Europe by the same publisher that year. However, Panasonic chose not to give it a North American localization due to possible copyright infringement, so Synergy handled the release itself in 1995, retitling it Iron Angel of the Apocalypse. English subtitles were used with the original Japanese voice-overs.

== Reception ==
Reception

Review scores
Publication	Score
Electronic Gaming Monthly	13/40
Famitsu	21/40
Game Informer	5.5/10
GameFan	236/300
GamePro	12/20
Next Generation	3/5
3DO Magazine	2/5
Game Players	63%
Génération 4	29%
Strana Igr	3/10

Next Generation reviewed the game, rating it three stars out of five, and stated that "Not better than the rest, just different." Next Generation also reviewed the US version of the game, rating it three stars out of five, and stated that "it goes a long way toward leaving the trippy dreaminess from the Japanese version intact, and in some ways, makes it creepier."

== Sequel ==
There is a sequel to Iron Angel of the Apocalypse, entitled Iron Angel of the Apocalypse: The Return for the 3DO and Microsoft Windows.
