= Video game art =

Creative works using existing video game structure as its media

Video game art is a form of computer art that uses video games as an artistic medium. It encompasses a range of artistic practices, including the modification or repurposing of existing games and game structures, as well as the creation of art games from scratch or by modifying existing games.

Artists may intervene in online gameplay, use game engines to produce animation through machinima, adapt game environments for installation and performance art, or create generative artworks using game technologies.

Examples of video game art include Cory Arcangel's Super Mario Clouds and I Shot Andy Warhol, Joseph DeLappe's Dead in Iraq and Salt Satyagraha Online: Gandhi's March to Dandi in Second Life, the 2004–2005 Rhizome Commissions relating to games, Paolo Pedercini's Molleindustria works such as Unmanned and Every Day the Same Dream, and Ian Bogost's Cow Clicker.

== Techniques ==
=== Machinima ===
Machinima filmed in Second Life

Machinima is the use of real-time three-dimensional (3-D) graphics rendering engines to generate computer animation. The term also refers to works that incorporate this animation technique.

=== In-game intervention and performance ===
Artists may intervene in online games in a non-play manner, often disrupting games in progress in order to challenge or expose underlying conventions and functions of game play. Examples of this include Anne Marie Schleiner's Velvet-Strike (a project designed to allow players of realistic first person shooter games to use anti-war graffiti within the game to make an artistic statement) and Dead in Iraq (an art project created by Joseph DeLappe in which the player character purposely allows himself to be shot and then recites the names of US soldiers who have died in the Iraq War).

=== Site-specific installations and site-relative mods ===
Site-specific installations and site-relative gaming modifications ("mods"), replicate real-world places (often the art gallery in which they are displayed) to explore similarities and differences between real and virtual worlds. An example is What It Is Without the Hand That Wields It, where blood from kills in Counterstrike manifests and spills into a real life gallery.

=== Real-time performance instruments ===
Video games can be incorporated into live audio and visual performance using a variety of instruments and computers such as electronic keyboards embedded with music chips. See also chiptune and the Fijuu project.

=== Generative art mods ===
Generative art mods exploit the real-time capabilities of game technologies to produce ever-renewing autonomous artworks. Examples include Julian Oliver's ioq3apaint, a generative painting system that uses the actions of software agents in combat to drive the painting process, Alison Mealy's UnrealArt which takes the movements of game entities and uses them to control a drawing process in an external program, Kent Sheely's "Cities in Flux," a Grand Theft Auto: San Andreas mod that glitches and distorts the game's world in real-time, and RetroYou's R/C Racer a modification of the graphic elements of a racing game which results in rich fields of colour and shape.

== See also ==
- Art game
- Adaptive music
- Demoscene
- Digital art
- Electronic art
- Electronic Language International Festival
- Game Masters
- Game studies
- Interactive art
- Internet art
- In-game photography
- Mod (video gaming)
- Software art
- Virtual art

== Sources ==
- GameScenes: Art in the Age of Videogames. (Johan & Levi, 2006). Edited by Matteo Bittanti and Domenico Quaranta.
- Cannon, Rebecca. "Introduction to artistic computer game modification" (PDF). Archived from the original on 2004-03-09.
- Videogames and Art by Andy Clarke and Grethe Mitchell (eds.)
- Journal of Media Practice vol 7, no. 1 (special edition on videogames and art) by Andy Clarke and Grethe Mitchell (eds.)
- Switch, Art & Games issue, 1999, online magazine of the CADRE Laboratory for New Media, San Jose State University
- From "First-Person Shooter" to Multi-User Knowledge Spaces Mathias Fuchs and Sylvia Eckermann
- Konsum Art-Server nTRACKER Margarete Jahrmann and Max Moswitzer
- Messages For A First Person Perspective Maia Engeli
- Smuts, Aaron (2005). "Are Video Games Art?". Archived from the original on 2010-12-14.
