= Haruhiko Shono =

Japanese artist and video game director

Haruhiko Shono (庄野 晴彦, Shōno Haruhiko; born 1960) is a Japanese computer graphics artist for films as well as a video game director. He has served as director for numerous computer games and has provided CG work for motion pictures with Will, Ltd. (有限会社ウイル), where he serves as corporate representative. He is best known to Western audiences for his steampunk-inspired visual novel, Gadget, and for his work on the 2004 film, Casshern.

Shono's creative career began in 1985 with the formation of Radical TV. Shono was hired as a member of the visual performance unit, and here he gained an interest in the visual aspects of the film industry. With evidence of visual artistry talent already apparent, Shono was entrusted with the responsibility to act as lead visual display artist in Radical TV's audio-visual display showcase at Expo '85 entitled TV War. The display would be recognized as one of the most significant affirmations of the Japanese IDM subculture.

Shono's first solo-work came in the form of Alice (1991), a highly stylistic visual novel based on the Alice in Wonderland stories. This game won Shono the Multimedia Grand Prix MITI Minister's Prize. In 1992 Shono would again win the MITI Prize for his game L-Zone, which would remain on Japan's list of best-selling CD-ROMs for several years. In 1993, Shono was again awarded the MITI Prize as well as the Multimedia Association Chairman's Prize for his game, Gadget.

For his striking visual style and his mastery of lavish computer graphics at the dawn of the point-and-click adventure game genre, Newsweek named him one of the "most influential people to watch in Cyberspace," and coined the term "cybergames" to describe his highly-realistic visual games whose visual style have been compared to those of Cyan's 1993 best-seller, Myst.

== Film ==
- 1992 - Virtual Drug Trance (director)
- 1992 - Virtual Drug Zone (director)
- 1995 - Gadget Trips/Mindscapes - A kaleidoscopic 79-minute retelling of the 1993 Gadget story intended to explain the development of the Sensorama weapon and the war that serves as backdrop to the game. (director)
- 1998 - Gadget Trips/Mindscapes - A remake of the earlier Mindscapes employing enhanced graphics. (director)
- 2001 - Virtual Drug VRD 2001 (voice actor)
- 2002 - Tokyo Noise (interview)
- 2004 - Casshern (Conceptual design / CG Supervisor)
- 2006 - Archangels Smile (笑う大天使) (Mechanical designer)
- 2011 - Eiga Kaibutsukun (CG Modeling director)
- 2016 - Terra Formars (テラフォーマーズ) (CG director)
- 2016 - Kōkaku Kidōtai - Shin Gekijōban: Virtual Reality Diver (Digital art)

== Television ==
- 1985 - Radical TV (Video performance unit)
- 1989 - IQ Engine (IQエンジン) (Opening CGI)

== Games ==
- 1991 - Alice (PC) (director)
- 1992 - L-Zone (PC) (director)
- 1993 - Gadget (PC) (director)
- 1997 - GADGET Past as Future (director) - An enhanced remake of the 1993 Gadget (PC) (director)
- 1997 - Preview & Reprise Haruhiko Shono (PC) - Including preview version of the unreleased Underworld
- 2002 - Kamaitachi no Yoru 2 (かまいたちの夜2 監獄島のわらべ唄) (PS2, PSP) (CG Supervisor) - Sequel to Chunsoft's 1994 Kamaitachi no Yoru
- 2007 - Imabikisō (PS3, Wii) (art director, CG work)

== Books ==
- 1994 - Inside Out With GADGET: Age of Irons and Weapons (Inside Out with GADGET 『鉄と兵器の時代』) - A detailed look at the steampunk-inspired world of Gadget.

== Awards and honors ==
- 1991 - Minister of International Trade and Industry's AVA Multimedia Grand Prix Award (AVAマルチメディアグランプリ 通産大臣賞を受賞) (for Alice)
- 1992 - MMA Chairman's Grand Prix Award for Multimedia (マルチメディアグランプリ MMA会長賞を受賞) (for L-Zone)
- 1993 - MITI Multimedia Grand Prix Award (for Gadget)
- 1995 - Named one of the "most influential people to watch in Cyberspace" (Newsweek Magazine)
