= Kuniyoshi Kaneko =

Japanese painter, illustrator and photographer

Kuniyoshi Kaneko (金子 國義, Kaneko Kuniyoshi; 23 July 1936 – 17 March 2015) was a Japanese painter, illustrator and photographer perhaps best known for his paintings and drawings of women in bondage such as his illustrations for a Japanese edition of Lewis Carroll's Alice in Wonderland. The musical performer Momus released a song about his work entitled "The Cabinet of Kuniyoshi Kaneko". In 1991 Kaneko provided the artwork for Alice: An Interactive Museum click-and-go adventure game. In 1992 his work was included in Adam and Eve an exhibition at the Saitama Kenritsu Kindai Bijutsukan (Museum of Modern Art) in Saitama. Kuniyoshi died of heart failure on 17 March 2015 at the age of 78.

== Biography ==
Descended from proprietors of a brothel in the Yoshiwara pleasure district of Tokyo, and immersed in traditional Japanese culture from an early age, Kaneko became fascinated with dance and kabuki theater during his childhood. While studying fine arts, he worked as an assistant creating stage sets for kabuki productions. Raised in a predominantly female environment, he initially drew women—particularly fashion models, actresses, and dancers—but, captivated by the films of Federico Fellini and Luchino Visconti, he soon developed a desire to paint heroines inspired by Western culture. In 1965, he met the writer Tatsuhiko Shibusawa (1928–1987), a leading Japanese specialist on eroticism and translator of Sade and Georges Bataille, who recognized his talent. It was, however, Kosaku Ikuta (1924–1994), another Japanese translator of Bataille, who asked him in 1975 to illustrate Story of the Eye and Madame Edwarda.

He is best known for his erotic paintings and drawings of women, as well as for his highly provocative illustrations for a 1974 Japanese edition of Alice's Adventures in Wonderland by Lewis Carroll. He also illustrated Story of O by Pauline Réage in 1966 and, on several occasions during the 1970s and again in the 1990s, works by Georges Bataille, including the Japanese edition of Story of the Eye, translated by Kosaku Ikuta and published in 1976 (a new edition issued in 1997 was expanded with additional drawings). Above all, however, it was Madame Edwarda that profoundly influenced him, to the point that he sometimes identified himself with the novella's eponymous character. This fascination was further reinforced by his meeting with Pierre Bourgeade in Paris in 1997. His style has often been compared to the surrealism of Balthus, Magritte, and Pierre Molinier. In addition to his work as a painter, Kaneko created theatrical productions and performance art, and was also a photographer. Among his published photographic albums are Vamp (1994), Les Jeux (1997), La Porte dévergondée (1999), and Drink Me Eat Me, Seven Oriental Beauties (2004), a volume devoted to seven Japanese femme fatales portrayed in seductive and provocative poses.

In 1991, Kaneko provided the illustrations for the point-and-click adventure game Alice: An Interactive Museum. In 1992, his work was featured in the exhibition Adam and Eve at the Saitama Museum of Modern Art (Saitama Kenritsu Kindai Bijutsukan). Kuniyoshi Kaneko died of heart failure on 17 March 2015 at the age of 78.

The musical artist Momus wrote a song inspired by Kaneko's work entitled "The Cabinet of Kuniyoshi Kaneko".
