= Moondust (video game) =

1983 video game

- Box art
- Publisher: Creative Software
- Designer: Jaron Lanier
- Platform: Commodore 64
- Release: 1983
- Genres: Music game, art game
- Mode: Single player

Moondust is a 1983 generative music video game created for the Commodore 64 by virtual reality pioneer, Jaron Lanier. Moondust was programmed in 6502 assembly in 1982, and is considered the first art video game. Moondust has frequently been used as an art installation piece in museum exhibitions from Corcoran Gallery of Art's 1983 "ARTcade" to the Smithsonian's 2012 "The Art of Video Games". It has also been used by Lanier and others in papers and lectures as an example to demonstrate the unexpected ephemerality of digital data.

Moondust is also considered to be the first interactive music publication, and it sold quite successfully. With the profits from Moondust and additional funding from Marvin Minsky, Lanier formed VPL which would later go on to create the DataGlove and the DataSuit and to become one of the primary innovators of virtual-reality research and development throughout the 1980s.

== Gameplay ==
Screenshot of gameplay

Moondust's gameplay is characterized by graphical complexity, and the game features an abstract ambient score. The goal of the game is to cover the bullseye at the center of the screen with "moonjuice". To do this, the player controls spaceman Jose Scriabin (named in honor of synaesthetic composer Alexander Scriabin) as he drops a seed square and then moves around the screen in arcing paths to run over the seed, smearing it to cover the bullseye. As Jose travels, his flight patterns and those of the bullet-shaped spaceships he must avoid are created and as they pass through the trails that are created, and as the moonjuice spreads and smears, the musical score is modified according to a generative algorithm. In-game scoring system assigns point-values according to an algorithm when the level is completed. Players start with three seeds but may acquire more if they have scored highly enough. The game has been compared to the works of Jeff Minter.

The game features 4 modes: Beginner, Evasive, Freestyle, and Spinsanity. In Beginner mode, the seeds that Jose must smear remain in one position wherever they had been dropped. In Evasive mode, however, the seeds seek to evade Jose by rushing to the edge of the screen. Freestyle mode greatly increases the player's control over Jose, removing the physical element of momentum to connect Jose's motions directly to the joystick controller's. In Spinsanity mode, the spaceships travel in a spiral pattern making smearing of the seed more difficult for the player.

== Reception ==
Ahoy!'s review began "And now for something completely different. You have never seen anything like Moondust ... No mazes, no nuke the alien aggressors, no 'find ring, sit on ring'". The magazine, which gave the game a grade of B for graphics and A for gameplay, stated that it was "not for everybody", warning that "the instructions are confusing. Even the people at Creative Software didn't know what Lanier was up to". The review nonetheless concluded "Players shopping for a non-violent game that incorporates graphics and music will want to consider Moondust ... I recommend it". The Commodore 64 Home Companion agreed on Moondust's uniqueness, describing it as "one of the most creative new games I've seen for any computer". Describing gameplay as "more like ballet than combat", the book concluded that it "is a computer game for people who don't like computer games".
