= The New Games Book =

1976 collection of games focused on physicality, play, and cooperation

The New Games Book (1976)

The New Games Book and its companion, More New Games, were resources developed for the "New Games" movement which began in the late 1960s to encourage people to play non-competitive or friendlier games. Many of the "New Games" may now be seen played, in their modern variants, in church youth groups, summer camps, gym classes, theatre workshops and as team-building exercises for organizations.

The New Games movement was initiated by Rose (Pat) Farrington, who helped to organize the first New Games Tournament at Gerbode Preserve in October 1973. The tournament was funded by The Point Foundation.

The success of this tournament led to the creation of the New Games Foundation, which published The New Games Book in 1976 when the Foundation was under the direction of Bernie DeKoven, Burton Naiditch and John O'Connell. DeKoven was one of the main contributors to the development of the New Games Training program, which was key to the dissemination of the New Games concept worldwide. The Foundation dissolved in 1983.

- The New Games Book edited by Andrew Fluegelman, 1976 ISBN 0-385-12516-X
- More New Games edited by Andrew Fluegelman, 1981 ISBN 0-385-17514-0
- New Games for the Whole Family by Dale N. Le Fevre, 1988 ISBN 0-399-51448-1 (revised as The Spirit of Play, 2007 ISBN 1-84409-092-2).
- Best New Games by Dale N. Le Fevre, 2002, ISBN 0-7360-3685-7
  - Best New Games—Updated Edition by Dale N. Le Fevre, 2012 ISBN 1-4504-2188-1
