= Fun =

Pleasure, enjoyment, or amusement

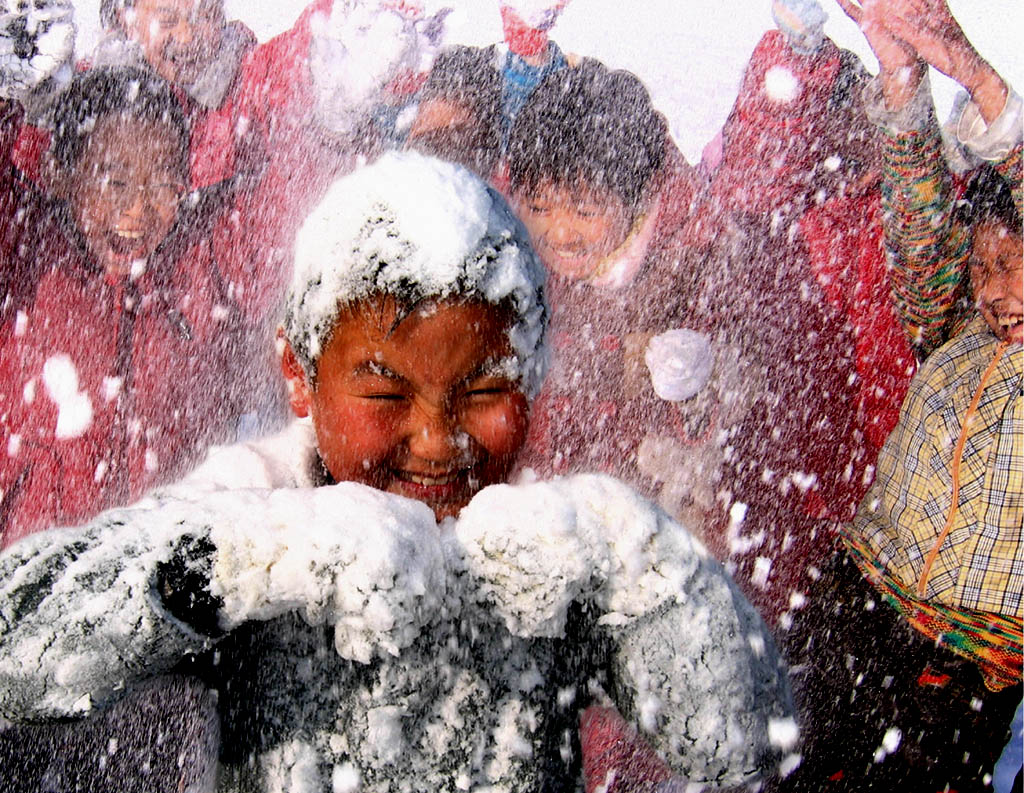
Children having fun playing with snow

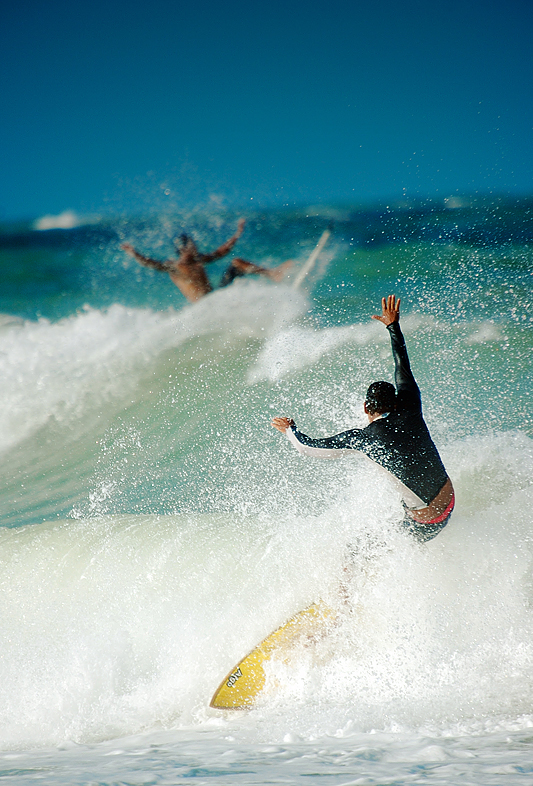
Surfers enjoying their sport

Fun is defined by the Oxford English Dictionary as "light-hearted pleasure, enjoyment, or amusement; boisterous joviality or merrymaking; entertainment".

== Etymology and usage ==
The word fun is associated with sports, entertaining media, high merriment, and amusement. Although its etymology is uncertain, it has been speculated that it may be derived from Middle English fonne (fool) and fonnen (the one fooling the other). An 18th-century meaning (still used in Orkney and Shetland) was "cheat, trick, hoax", a meaning still retained in the phrase "to make fun of".

The landlady was going to reply, but was prevented by the peace-making sergeant, sorely to the displeasure of Partridge, who was a great lover of what is called fun, and a great promoter of those harmless quarrels which tend rather to the production of comical than tragical incidents.
Henry Fielding, The History of Tom Jones, a Foundling (1749)

The way the word fun is used demonstrates its distinctive elusiveness and happiness. Expressions such as "Have fun!" and "That was fun!" indicate that fun is pleasant, personal, and to some extent unpredictable. Expressions such as "I was making fun of myself" convey the sense that fun is something that can be amusing and not to be taken seriously. The adjective "funny" has two meanings, which often need to be clarified between a speaker and listener. One meaning is "amusing, jocular, droll" and the other meaning is "odd, quirky, peculiar". These differences indicate the evanescent and experiential nature of fun and the difficulty of distinguishing "fun" from "enjoyment".

== Activities ==
Many physical activities provide opportunities to play and have fun. Not only can these activities be fun, but they can also improve physical and mental states.

Opportunities for fun
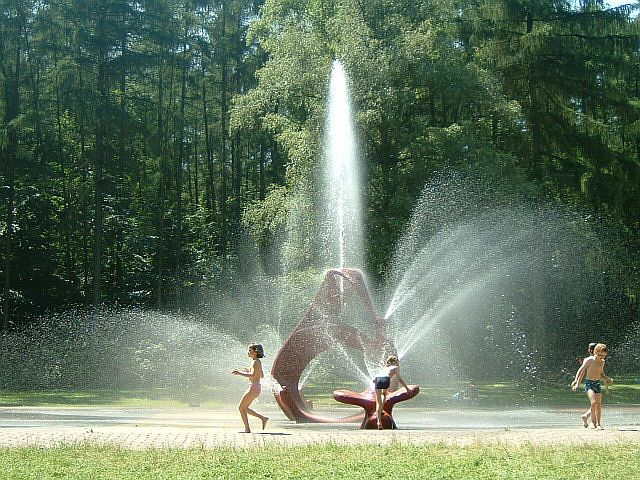
Children in a playground fountain (Frankfurt 2006)

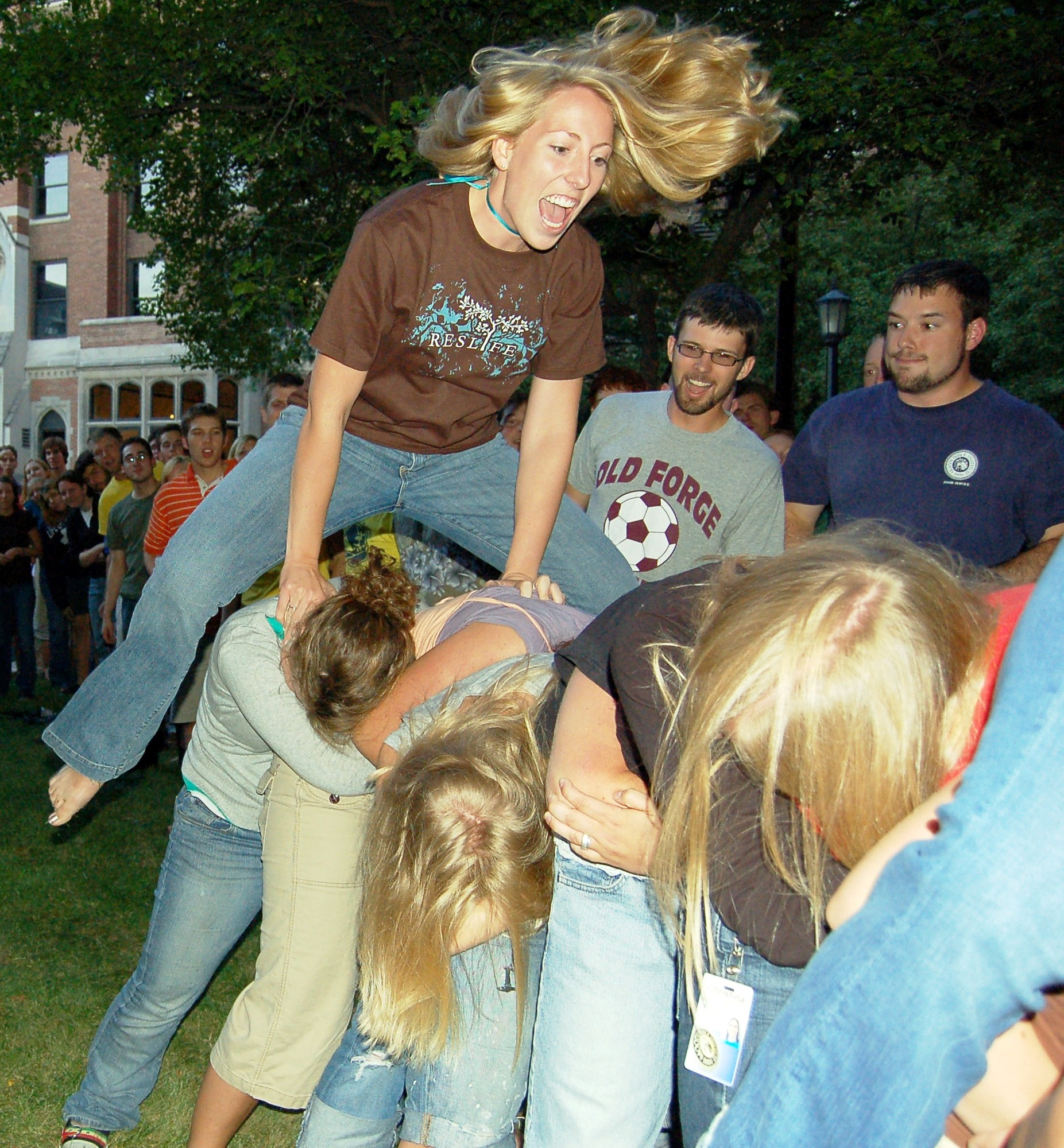
Young adults playing (Chicago 2006)

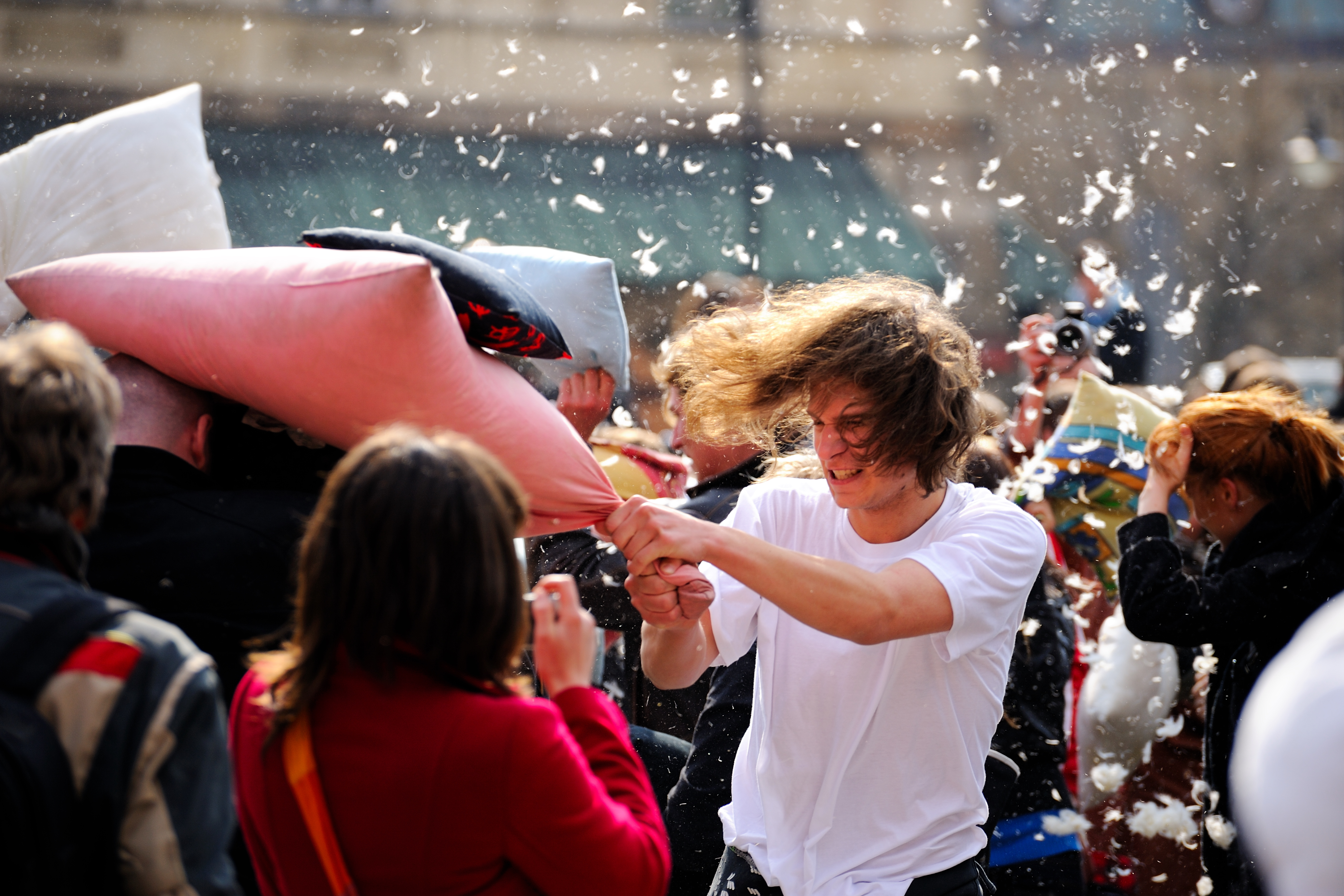
Pillow fight (Warsaw 2010)

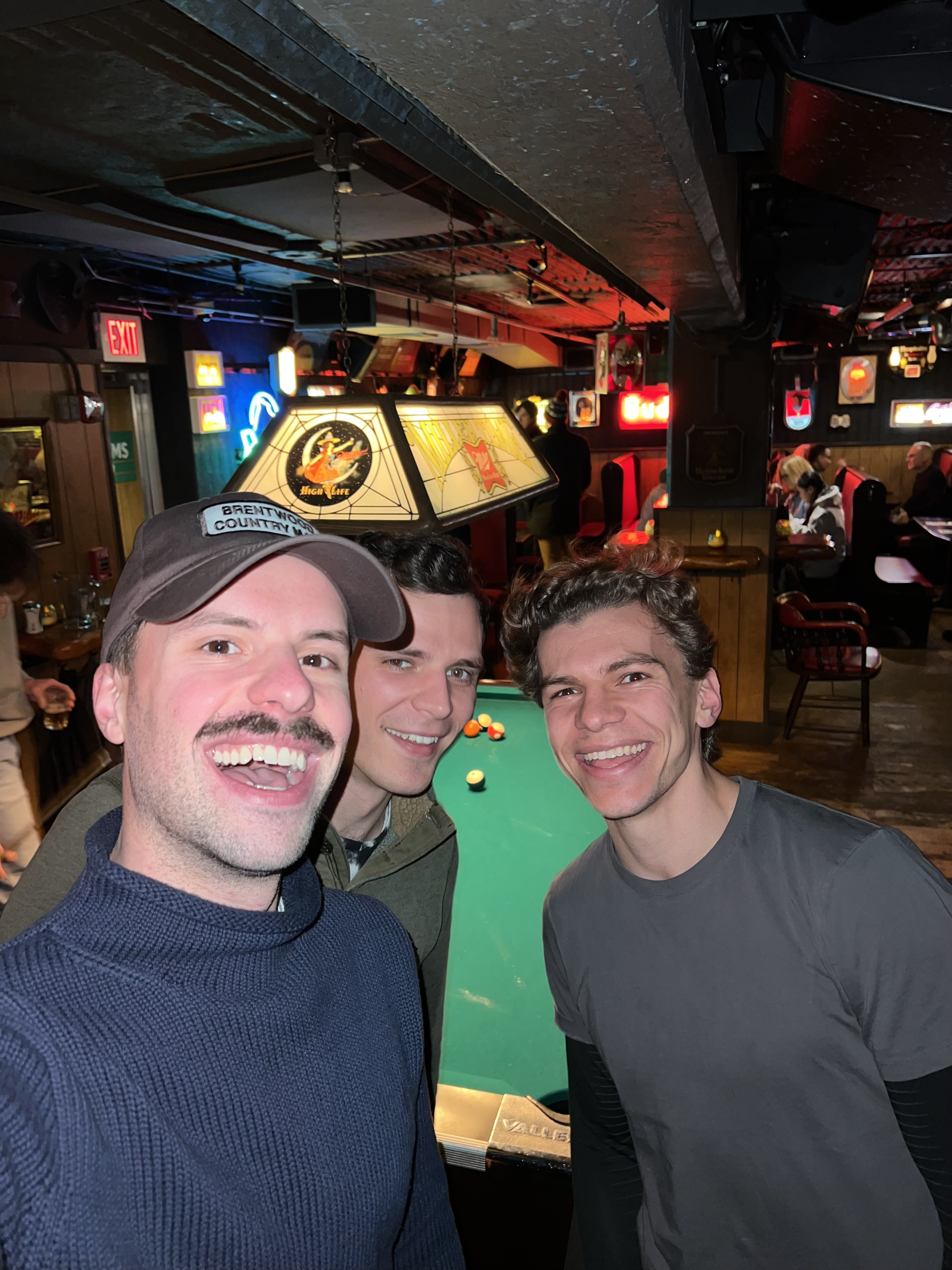
Three people at a dive bar (Boston 2023)

== Psychology ==
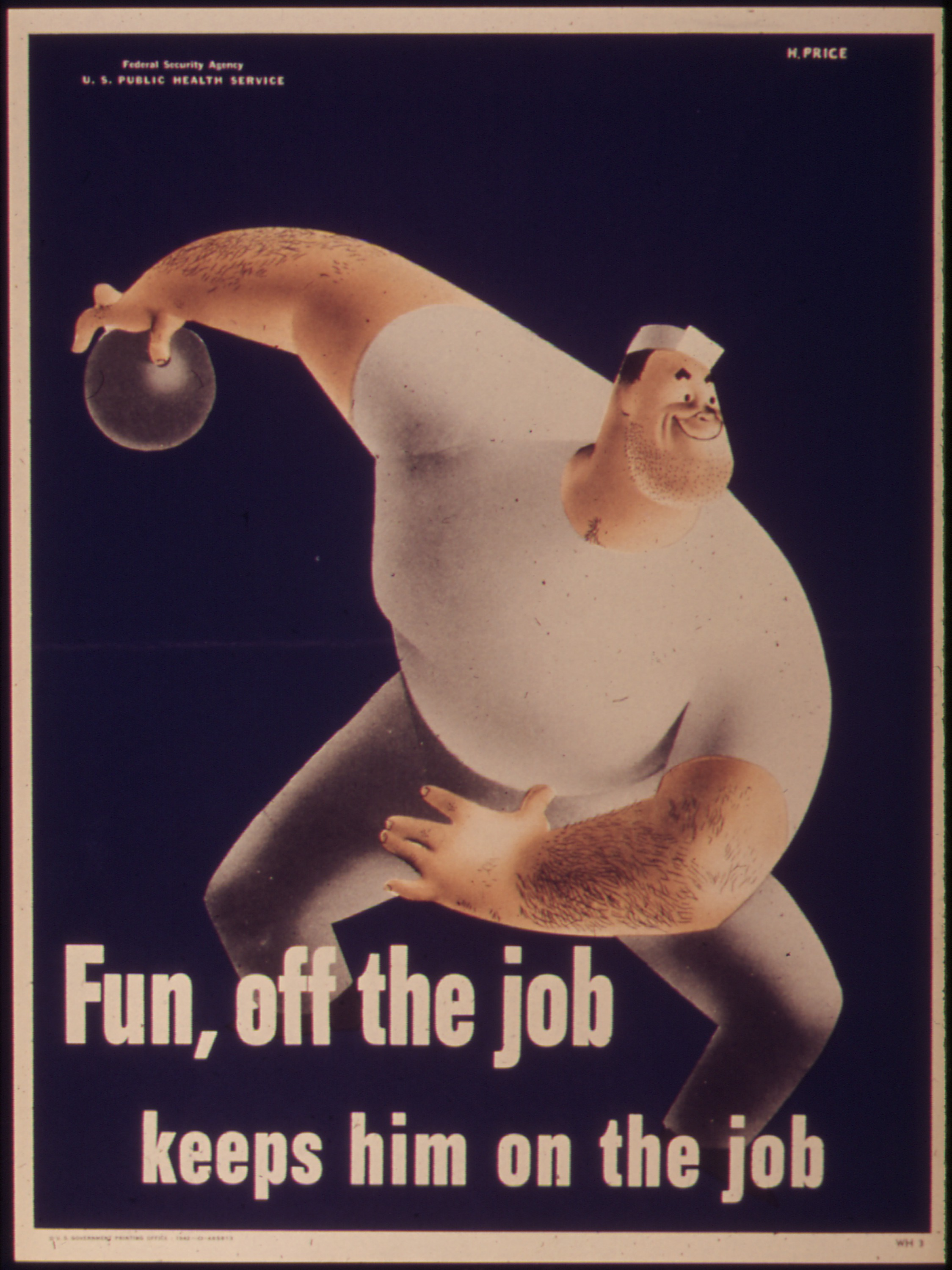
World War II era employment poster about the importance of fun

According to Johan Huizinga, fun is "an absolutely primary category of life, familiar to everybody at a glance right down to the animal level." Psychological studies reveal both the importance of fun and its effect on time perception, which is sometimes said to be shortened when one is having fun. As the adage states: "Time flies when you're having fun".

It has been suggested that games, toys, and activities perceived as fun are often challenging in some way. When a person is challenged to think consciously, overcome challenge and learn something new, they are more likely to enjoy a new experience and view it as fun. A change from routine activities appears to be at the core of this perception, since people spend much of a typical day engaged in activities that are routine and require limited conscious thinking. Routine information is processed by the brain as a "chunked pattern": "We rarely look at the real world", according to game designer Raph Koster, "we instead recognize something we have chunked, and leave it at that. [...] One might argue that the essence of much of art is in forcing us to see things as they really are rather than as we assume them to be". Since it helps people to relax, fun is sometimes regarded as a "social lubricant", important in adding "to one's pleasure in life" and helping to "act as a buffer against stress".

For children, fun is strongly related to play and they have great capacity to extract the fun from it in a spontaneous and inventive way. Play "involves the capacity to have fun – to be able to return, at least for a little while, to never-never land and enjoy it."

== Physiology ==
Some scientists have identified areas of the brain associated with the perception of novelty, which are stimulated when faced with "unusual or surprising circumstances". Information is initially received in the hippocampus, the site of long-term memory consolidation, where the brain attempts to match the new information with recognizable patterns stored in long-term memory. When it is unable to do this, the brain releases dopamine, a chemical which stimulates the amygdala, the site of emotion, and creates a pleasurable feeling that is associated with the new memory. In other words, fun is created by stimulating the brain with novelty.

== In popular culture ==
With the emergence of entertainment industry, fun is sold as a consumer product in the form of games, novelties, television, toys and other amusements. Marxist sociologists such as the Frankfurt School criticise mass-manufactured fun as too calculated and empty to be fully satisfying. Bill Griffith satirises this dysphoria when his cartoon character Zippy the Pinhead asks mechanically, "Are we having fun yet?" In The Beatles song "She's Leaving Home" fun is called "the one thing that money can't buy."

== See also ==
- Epicurus
- Hedonic treadmill
- Hedonism
