= Tiffany Holmes =

American artist and educator

- Born: 1964 (age 61–62); Baltimore, Maryland, U.S.
- Education: Williams College, Maryland Institute College of Art, University of Maryland, Baltimore County, University of Plymouth
- Website: tiffanyholmes.com

Tiffany Holmes (born 1964) is an American new media artist and educator. She is based in Chicago, Illinois.

== Early life and education ==
Tiffany Holmes was born in 1964 in Baltimore, Maryland. Her formal education includes: a PhD (2004–2010) "Eco-visualization: Combining art and technology to reduce energy consumption," from the Arts Department at University of Plymouth. Additionally she has an MFA degree (1996–1999) in Imaging and Digital Arts, University of Maryland, Baltimore County; an MFA degree (1992–1996) in Painting, Maryland Institute College of Art (MICA); and a BA degree (1986–1990, cum laude) Art History with a minor in Environmental Studies, Williams College.

== Work ==
In her research and practice, Holmes explores the potential of technology to promote positive environmental stewardship. She coined the term "eco-visualization" in 2005. Her creative projects include a commission for the National Center for Supercomputing Applications where sequences of experimental animations visualize real time energy loads.

Her paper detailing this work, “Eco-visualization: Combining art and technology to reduce energy consumption,” won a Best Paper award at Creativity and Cognition 2007 and a 2010 doctoral degree. She lectures and exhibits worldwide in these venues: Museum of Contemporary Art Chicago, J. Paul Getty Museum in Los Angeles, 01SJ Biennial, SIGGRAPH 2000, Worldart in Denmark, Interaction ’01 in Japan, ISEA Nagoya. A recipient of the Michigan Society of Fellows research fellowship in 1998, Holmes has earned the Illinois Arts Council individual grant, an Artists-in-Labs residency award in Switzerland, and a 2010 Rhizome Commission.

Holmes has been a professor in the Department of Art and Technology Studies at the School of the Art Institute of Chicago, and in 2018 joined the administrative leadership team at Maryland Institute College of Art.

== Art work ==
- We can't swim forever (2011)
- darkSky (2009)
- World Offset (2008)
- fishbowl (2005)
- Floating Point (2004)
- Follow the Mouse (2001)

== Publications ==
- Socializing Blogs, a Guide for Beginners (2011) Learning Through Digital Media: Experiments in Technology and Pedagogy, editor, 27-34.
- Beyond Eco-Art: 21st century Eco-visualization (2010) Transdiscourse: Volume 1: Mediated Environments, Springer Press.
- Searching for stories in the sea of data: Promoting environmental stewardship though ecovisualization (2007) Journal of Museum Education, Volume 32, Number 3 / Fall 2007: 273-284.
- Eco-visualization: combining art and technology to reduce energy consumption (2007) Proceedings of the 6th ACM SIGCHI conference on Creativity & Cognition, Washington, DC, USA, SESSION: Tools, media and environments: 153-162.
- Environmental Awareness though Eco-visualization: Combining Art and Technology To Promote Sustainability. Reconstruction 6.3: Studies in Contemporary Culture on “Water: Resources & Discourses,” summer 2006.
- Floating Point: A Creative Visualization of Water Quality, residency report, in Artists-In-Labs: Processes of Inquiry, editor, Jill Scott, Springer Press, 2006.
- The Mighty Mouse: Communicating addiction research through computer art, Intelligent Agent, thread: biotech/transgenics, Winter-Summer 2003, http://www.intelligentagent.com/.
- Arcade Classics Spawn Art? Current Trends in the Art Game Genre. Fine Arts Forum, 2003.
- What do computers eat? Teaching beginners to think critically about technology and art, in Computers and Graphics, Elsevier, June 2003, Volume 27, No. 3, 361-368.
- Performing Virtual Dissection, in Art, Technology, Consciousness, London: Intellect Books, 2000.
- The Corporeal Stenographer: Language, Gesture, Cyberspace, published in conjunction with catalogue of international traveling exhibit, The Digital Salon. Leonardo Almanac: International Resources in Art, Science, Technology, Volume 32, Cambridge, MA: MIT Press, 1999.
