= Celia Pearce =

American game designer (born 1961)

- Born: September 6, 1961 (age 65); Los Angeles, California, US

Academic background
- Education: SMARTlab, Central Saint Martins College of Art and Design, University of the Arts London (PhD)
- Doctoral advisor: Lizbeth Goodman

Academic work
- Main interests: Game design
- Website: cpandfriends.com

Celia Pearce (born September 6, 1961) is an American game designer currently teaching at Northeastern University in the College of Arts Media and Design. She is a co-founder and current Festival Chair of IndieCade, an international festival of independent games, co-founder of the Ludica women’s game collective, and founder of the Playable Theatre Project. She also gives occasional talks and shows games at events such as Different Games and Incubate Arcade.

== Life and career ==
Before working in game design starting in the 1980s, Pearce designed theme park and museum attractions making "location-based entertainment. She previously held a position at the Georgia Institute of Technology as Head of the Experimental Game Lab and Emergent Game Group. In 2018, Pearce worked on a summer residency at Blast Theory. She was an artist in residence at the University of California, Los Angeles Game Lab in 2015.

Pearce's work focuses on the creation and moderation of virtual worlds and networks, as well as covering topics such as cosplay, role-playing, and gender representation in video games. In her profession, Pearce has also worked with other game designers such as Tracy Fullerton, Will Wright, and Eric Zimmerman.

== Games ==
=== Friendship Adventure Cards for Girls (1997) ===
A set of trading cards to extend the Rockett's World and Secret Paths CD-ROM game from Purple Moon, a girl gaming company founded by Brenda Laurel.

=== Candy Crusher (2015) ===
- A strategic board game in which players rearrange and smash candy pieces with hammers in order to create the longest row. The game was designed in collaboration with Jeanie Choi, an MFA masters student in Interdisciplinary Arts at Northeastern.

=== CLITar (2016) ===
- A plush toy covered in pompoms. The player has to find hidden buttons between the pompoms, which then play synthesized woman's noises through a speaker.

=== eBee (2016) ===
- An electronic quilting game in which players build circuits with quilted hexagons that connect the central hub with a power source.

== Written works ==
- The Interactive Book: A Guide to the Interactive Revolution (1997)

A book exploring the history and potential of digital and interactive media.

- Playing Dress-Up: Costumes, Roleplay and Imagination (2007)

A co-authored essay exploring dressing up as a historically female practice and how it fits into modern entertainment means.

- Communities of Play (2011)

An exploration of emergent fan cultures in digital worlds with integrated player networks.

- Ethnography and Virtual Worlds (2012)

A guide meant for those interested in studying online virtual worlds using scientific methods and descriptions. Co-authored with Tom Boellstorff, Bonnie Nardi, and T. L. Taylor.

- Meet Me at the Fair: A World’s Fair Reader (2014) A group of short texts examining world's fairs. Coauthored with Laura Hollengreen, Rebecca Rouse, and Bobby Schweizer.

- Playframes: How do we know we are playing? (2024)

A theory of what playing is and why we need it. Foreword by Janet Murray.
