= L-Zone =

1992 video game

- Developer: Synergy Inc.
- Publisher: Synergy Inc.
- Platforms: Classic Mac OS; NEC PC-9801; Windows
- Release: 1992
- Genre: Adventure game

L-Zone is a 1992 video game published by Synergy Inc.

== Gameplay ==
L-Zone is a game in which the player explores the setting in the far future, in a valley by the deserted Dome City of No Name.

== Reception ==
Tony Reveaux reviewed the game for Computer Gaming World, and called L-Zone an embodiment of technological adventure in the future tense.
