= Game studies =

Study of games and the act of playing them

Game studies, also known as ludology (from ludus 'game' and -logia 'study, research') or gaming theory, is an interdisciplinary academic field focused on the analysis of games, the act of playing them, players, and the sociocultural contexts surrounding these activities. It is a field of cultural studies that deals with all types of games throughout history. This field of research employes methodologies from folkloristics and cultural heritage, sociology and psychology, while examining aspects of the design of the game, the players within the game, and the role the game plays in its society or culture. Game studies is oftentimes confused with the study of video games, but this is only one area of focus; in reality game studies encompasses all types of gaming, including sports, board games, etc.

Before video games, game studies were rooted primarily in anthropology. However, with the development and spread of video games, games studies has diversified methodologically, to include approaches from sociology, psychology, and other fields.

There are now a number of strands within game studies: "social science" approaches explore how games function in society, and their interactions with human psychology, often using empirical methods such as surveys and controlled lab experiments. "Humanities-based" approaches emphasise how games generate meanings and reflect or subvert wider social and cultural discourses. These often use more interpretative methods, such as close reading, textual analysis, and audience theory, methods shared with other media disciplines such as television and film studies. Social sciences and humanities approaches can cross over, for example in the case of ethnographic or folkloristic studies, where fieldwork may involve patiently observing games to try to understand their social and cultural meanings. "Game design" approaches are closely related to creative practice, analysing game mechanics and aesthetics in order to inform the development of new games. Finally, "industrial" and "engineering" approaches apply mostly to video games and less to games in general, and examine things such as computer graphics, artificial intelligence, and networking.

== History ==
Scholars began to get the sense that the study of games could (and should) be considered a field in its own right when:

1. Irving Finkel organized a colloquium in 1990 that grew into the International Board Game Studies Association.
2. Gonzalo Frasca popularized the term "ludology" (from the Latin word for game, ludus) in 1999.
3. Academic journals like Board Game Studies and Game Studies published their first issues in 1998 and 2001 respectively.
4. The Digital Games Research Association was created in 2003.

As a young field, it gathers scholars from different disciplines that had been broadly studying games, such as psychology, anthropology, economy, education, and sociology. The earliest known use of the term "ludology" occurred in 1982, in Mihaly Csikszentmihalyi's "Does Being Human Matter – On Some Interpretive Problems of Comparative Ludology."

== Social science ==
A line of research in media violence studies, including a 1971 experimental field study on television violence, suggested that exposure to fictional violence might reduce aggressive behavior. This interpretation later became associated with the catharsis hypothesis, which was subsequently applied in research on violent video games, suggesting that playing such games could channel latent aggression and thereby reduce aggression in players' real lives. However, a meta-study performed by Craig A. Anderson and Brad J. Bushman, in 2001, examined data starting from the 1980s up until the article was published. The purpose of this study was to examine whether or not playing violent video games led to an increase in aggressive behaviors. They concluded that exposure to violence in video games did indeed cause an increase in aggression. However, it has been pointed out, and even stressed, by psychologist Jonathan Freedman that this research was very limited and even problematic since overly strong claims were made and the authors themselves seemed extremely biased in their writings. More recent studies, such as the one performed by Christopher J. Ferguson at Texas A&M International University have come to drastically different conclusions. In this study, individuals were either randomly assigned a game, or allowed to choose a game, in both the randomized and the choice conditions exposure to violent video games caused no difference in aggression. A later study (performed by the same people) looked for correlations between trait aggression, violent crimes, and exposure to both real life violence and violence in video games, this study suggests that while family violence and trait aggression are highly correlated with violent crime, exposure to video game violence was not a good predictor of violent crime, having little to no correlation, unless also paired with the above traits that had a much higher correlation. Over the past 15 years, a large number of meta-studies have been applied to this issue, each coming to its own conclusion, resulting in little consensus in the ludology community. It is also thought that even nonviolent video games may lead to aggressive and violent behavior. Anderson and Dill seem to believe that it may be due to the frustration of playing video games that could in turn result in violent, aggressive behavior.

Game designers Amy Jo Kim and Jane McGonigal have suggested that platforms which leverage the powerful qualities of video games in non-game contexts can maximize learning. Known as the gamification of learning, using game elements in non-game contexts extracts the properties of games from within the game context, and applies them to a learning context such as the classroom.

Another positive aspect of video games is its conducive character towards the involvement of a person in other cultural activities. The probability of game playing increases with the consumption of other cultural goods (e.g., listening to music or watching television) or active involvement in artistic activities (e.g., writing or visual arts production). Video games, by being complementary to more traditional forms of cultural consumption, exhibit value from a cultural perspective.

More sociologically-informed research has sought to move away from simplistic ideas of gaming as either 'negative' or 'positive', but rather seeking to understand its role and location in the complexities of everyday life. For example, it has been suggested by Nina Fefferman that the very popular MMO World of Warcraft could be used to study the dissemination of infectious diseases because of the accidental spread of a plague-like disease in the gameworld.

== "Ludology" vs "narratology" ==
A major focus in game studies is the debate surrounding narratology and ludology. Many ludologists believe that the two are unable to exist together, while others believe that the two fields are similar but should be studied separately. Many narratologists believe that games should be looked at for their stories, like movies or novels. The ludological perspective says that games are not like these other mediums due to the fact that a player is actively taking part in the experience and should therefore be understood on their own terms. The idea that a videogame is "radically different to narratives as a cognitive and communicative structure" has led the development of new approaches to criticism that are focused on videogames as well as adapting, repurposing and proposing new ways of studying and theorizing about videogames. A recent approach towards game studies starts with an analysis of interface structures and challenges the keyboard-mouse paradigm with what is called a "ludic interface".

Academics across both fields provide scholarly insight into the different sides of this debate. Gonzalo Frasca, a notable ludologist due to his many publications regarding game studies, argues that while games share many similar elements with narrative stories, that should not prevent games to be studied as games. He seeks not "to replace the narratologic approach, but to complement it."

Jesper Juul, another notable ludologist, argues for a stricter separation of ludology and narratology. Juul argues that games "for all practicality can not tell stories." This argument holds that narratology and ludology cannot exist together because they are inherently different. Juul claims that the most significant difference between the two is that in a narrative, events "have to" follow each other, whereas in a game the player has control over what happens.

Garry Crawford and Victoria K. Gosling argue in favor of narratives being an essential part of games as these will contribute to, and be informed by, a gamer's personal life and identity narratives. As they write "it is impossible to isolate play from the social influences of everyday life, and in turn, play will have both intended and unintended consequences for the individual and society."

Janet Murray, in support of the narratologist method of video game argues that "stories can be participatory." In this argument, Murray is linking the characteristics of video games to narratives to further her point that video games should be analyzed through narratology. The term Ludonarrative dissonance refers to a conflict between both, such as when freedom in gameplay contradicts character development, such as criticism in the narrative of games like Red Dead Redemption 2.

Michalis Kokonis argues in favor of Gonzalo Frasca's article entitled "Ludologists love stories too: notes from a debate that never took place", which aimed to list and explain the misunderstandings, mistakes, and prejudices surrounding the narratology vs. ludology debate. Kokonis noted that "endorsing [Frasca's] constructivist spirit we will have to agree that the so-called Narratology vs. Ludology Dilemma is a false one and that this debate will have to be resolved, as it is of no help to the cause of establishing Computer Games Study as an autonomous and independent academic field."

== Other areas of research ==
As is common with most academic disciplines, there are a number of more specialized areas or sub-domains of study.

=== History of games ===
The study of the history of games can fall within the wider field of game studies, although it can also fall within and overlap with the field of history more generally.

This includes, for example, the study of the "pre-history" of video games, examining the origins of modern digital games in other 19th-20th century popular entertainments: fairground attractions and sideshows such as shooting games; early "Coney Island"-style pleasure parks with elements such as large roller-coasters and "haunted house" simulations; nineteenth century landscape simulations such as dioramas, panoramas, planetariums, and stereographs; and amusement arcades that had mechanical game machines and also peep-show film machines.

=== Historical game studies ===
Historical game studies is a sub-field that overlaps with the wider study of history, focused on analysing the way that games use and represent historical ideas and topics (as opposed to history of games, which is the study of how games themselves developed, were played, and changed over time).

=== Queer game studies ===
Queer game studies is an interdisciplinary field of inquiry that examines the intersection of video games and queer theory. It explores how video games serve as a platform for the expression and exploration of queer experiences, identities, and desires. While traditional understandings of LGBTQ representation in games focus on the inclusion of queer characters or narratives, queer game studies broadens this perspective to encompass the ways in which games themselves can be played, interpreted, and designed through queer standpoints.

=== Virtual economies in gaming ===
Massive multiplayer online games can give economists clues about the real world. Markets based on digital information can be fully tracked as they are used by players, and thus real problems in the economy, such as inflation, deflation and even recession. The solutions the game designers come up with can therefore be studied with full information, and experiments can be performed where the economy can be studied as a whole. These games allow the economists to be omniscient, they can find every piece of information they need to study the economy, while in the real world they have to work with presumptions.

Former Finance Minister of Greece and Valve's in-house economist Yanis Varoufakis studied EVE Online as a measure for the Greek economic recovery and argued that video game communities such as Neopets and Fortnite give economists a venue for experimenting and simulating the economies of the future. Edward Castronova has studied virtual economies within a variety of games including Everquest and World of Warcraft.

=== Games and aging ===
In light of population ageing, there has been an interest into the use of games to improve the overall health and social connectedness of ageing players. For example, Adam Gazzaley and his team have designed NeuroRacer (a game that improves cognitive tasks outside of the game among its 60+ year old participants), while the AARP has organized a game jam to improve older people's social connections. Researchers such as Sarah Mosberg Iversen have argued that most of the academic work on games and ageing has been informed by notions of economical productivity, while Bob De Schutter and Vero Vanden Abeele have suggested a game design approach that is not focused on age-related decline but instead is rooted in the positive aspects of older age.

=== Cognitive benefits ===
The psychological research into games has yielded theories on how playing video games may be advantageous for both children and for adults. Some theories claim that video games in fact help improve cognitive abilities rather than impede their development. These improvement theories include the improvement of visual contrast sensitivity. Other developments include the ability to locate something specific among various impediments. This is primarily done in first-person shooter games where the protagonist must look at everything in a first person view while playing. By doing this they increase their spatial attention due to having to locate something among an area of diversions. These games place the player in a high intensity environment where the player must remain observant of their surroundings in order to achieve their goal, e.g., shooting an enemy player, while impediments obstruct their gameplay in the virtual world.

Another cognitive enhancement provided by playing video games would be the improvement of brain functioning speed. This happens as the player is immersed in an unendingly changing environment where they are required to constantly think and problem solve while playing in order to do well in the game. This constant problem solving forces the brain to constantly run and so the speed of thought is sharpened greatly, because the need to think quickly is required to succeed. The attention span of the player is also benefited. High action video games, such as fighting or racing games, require the user's constant attention and in the process the skill of concentration is sharpened.

The overcoming of the condition known as dyslexia is also considered an improvement due to the continuous utilization of controllers for the video games. This continuous process helps to train the users to overcome their condition which impedes in their abilities of interpretation. The ability of hand-eye coordination is also improved thanks in part to video games, due to the need to operate the controller and view the screen displaying the content all at the same time. The coordination of the player is enhanced due to the playing and continuous observation of a video game since the game gives high mental stimulation and coordination is important and therefore enhanced due to the constant visual and physical movement that is produced from the playing of the video game.

The playing of video games can also help increase a player's social skills. This is done by playing online multiplayer games which can require constant communication, this leads to socialization between players in order to achieve the goal within the game they may be playing. In addition it can help the users to meet new friends over their online games and at the same time communicate with friends they have already made in the past; those playing together online would only strengthen their already established bond through constant cooperation. Some video games are specifically designed to aid in learning, because of this another benefit of playing video games could be the educational value provided with the entertainment. Some video games present problem solving questions that the player must think on in order to properly solve, while action orientated video games require strategy in order to successfully complete. This process of being forced to think critically helps to sharpen the mind of the player.

=== Game culture ===
One aspect of game studies is the study of gaming culture. People who play video games are a subculture of their own. Gamers will often form communities with their own languages, attend conventions where they will dress up as their favorite characters, and have gaming competitions. One of these conventions, Gamescom 2018, had a record attendance with an estimated 370,000 attendees.

Esports are making a significant impact in gaming culture. In 2018, Newzoo, a marketing analytics company reported that 380 million people will watch esports that year. Many gamers seek to form communities to meet new people and share their love of games. In 2014, Newzoo reported that 81% of gamers attend esport to be a part of the gaming community. "61% of gamers attend live events and tournaments to connect with friends that they've met and played with online."

Throughout the years, there has been much research on the topic of game culture, specifically focusing on video games in relation to thinking, learning, gender, children, and war. When looking at game culture, particularly for early studies, multiplayer online games were usually the basis for research. However, more recent and wider ranging research has sought to understand not just gaming cultures, but in turn, how video games provide important insights into the modern nature of digital and participatory culture, patterns of consumption and identity formation, later modernity and contemporary political rationalities.

=== Demographics of video gamers (in the US) ===
- 75% of households have a gamer.
- 65% of adults play video games.
- 60% of adults play on smartphones, 52% play on a personal computer, and 49% play on a dedicated game console.
- 32 is the average age of male gamers.
- 34 is the average age of female gamers.
- 54% of gamers are men. 46% are women.

== See also ==
- Art game
- Video game art
- Video games as an art form
- Ludonarrative dissonance
