= Ludic =

Ludic may refer to:

- Games, structured play
- Ludic language, spoken in Russia

== See also ==
- Ludic fallacy, the misuse of games as models
- Ludic interface, in computing
- Ludic linguistics
- Ludology, or game studies
