= NeuroNation =

German cognitive training software

- Website type: cognitive training
- Available in: German, English, Spanish, Portuguese, Italian, Russian, French, Polish, Korean, Japanese
- Headquarters: Berlin, Germany
- Creators: Rojahn Ahmadi and Jakob Futorjanski
- Website: www.neuronation.com
- Commercial: yes
- Users: 10 million
- Launched: 2011

NeuroNation and its associated medical app NeuroNation MED are cognitive training software applications developed by the German healthcare technology company Synaptikon GmbH. NeuroNation was launched in 2011.

== Platform ==
The online platform was launched in 2011, and initially served Germany, Austria, and Switzerland. In 2014, Der Spiegel and XLHealth AG bought a 25% stake in NeuroNation, financing an expansion into English, French, Spanish, Italian, Russian, Japanese, and Portuguese markets.

NeuroNation is a multi-modal cognitive training application for prevention of neurodegenerative diseases and cognitive enhancement.

Its use is reimbursed by several German health insurers, including Deutsche BKK. While the NeuroNation app and similar ones are heavily advertised with claims of improving general cognitive function, there is no evidence to show that NeuroNation or similar programs do so; at most they improve performance in the training tasks given in the program.

The program began with a single-payment model, later shifting to a subscription business model. The app offers some content free, while other activities are available through in-app purchases.

== Scientific research ==
In the "Intera-KT" project, NeuroNation collaborated with the Berlin University Hospital Charité and other partners to digitise paper-based cognitive tests.

NeuroNation is currently participating in a study on the effects of independent cognitive training using Neuronation MED on patients with mild cognitive disorders and patients with Post COVID-19 condition.

In several studies, healthy participants who have used NeuroNation as a cognitive training tool have shown positive effects for working memory, memory, and executive functions. One study by MSH Medical School Hamburg and the University of Würzburg observed that subjects who participated in NeuroNation exercises exhibited improved memory, concentration, and general well-being.
