= LearningRx =

Brain training franchise

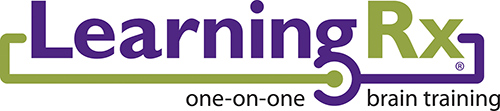
- Company type: Franchise
- Industry: Learning
- Founded: August 2002; 23 years ago in Colorado Springs, Colorado
- Founder: Ken Gibson
- Headquarters: Colorado Springs, Colorado, United States
- Website: Official website

LearningRx is a franchise based in Colorado Springs, Colorado. The company claims to improve cognitive abilities.

== Background and history ==
The company was founded by Ken Gibson, who started the first LearningRx in August 2002 in Colorado Springs, Colorado. The first franchise had $250,000 in revenue in its initial four months. Other LearningRx franchises were opened in 2003; 27 were started that year. The company says its teaching methods are grounded in founder Ken Gibson and his brother Keith Gibson's experience.

As of 2016 the company says its games are "designed by scientists to challenge core cognitive abilities;" prior to that, according to the FTC, it had "deceptively claim[ed] their programs were clinically proven to permanently improve serious health conditions like ADHD (attention deficit hyperactivity disorder), autism, dementia, Alzheimer's disease, strokes, and concussions".

== Legal matters ==
In January 2016, the Federal Trade Commission (FTC) settled with Lumosity which sold "brain training" programs or other products intended to improve cognitive function. FTC settled with LearningRx for $200,000 for similar reasons.

The FTC stated LearningRx made unproven assertions in its marketing materials that clinical trials had demonstrated LearningRx helped increase people's IQ and income and mitigated clients' medical issues. In its lawsuit, the FTC said LearningRx had been "deceptively claim[ing] their programs were clinically proven to permanently improve serious health conditions like ADHD (attention deficit hyperactivity disorder), autism, dementia, Alzheimer's disease, strokes, and concussions". LearningRx had made these claims on its website, Facebook, Twitter, advertising mail, as well as in advertisements in newspapers and on radio.

In 2016, LearningRx settled with the FTC by agreeing not to make the disputed assertions unless they had "competent and reliable scientific evidence" which was defined as randomized controlled trials done by competent scientists. For the judgment's monetary component, LearningRx agreed to pay $200,000 of a $4 million settlement.

== Reception ==
The "brain training" field has been controversial in the scientific community; in 2014 a group of 75 scientists put out a statement saying that most claims made by companies in the field were pseudoscience, which was countered several months later by an industry-organized group of scientists who said that there was evidence for their effectiveness.

In 2012 Douglas K. Detterman of the Case Western Reserve University said that the program's exercises help improve skills in tests conducted by the institution itself but not improvement on skills in general and that the studies conducted by commercial services that support their claims of benefits are poorly done.

== See also ==
- Cogmed
- Brain training
