= Neurohacking =

Modification of the brain

Neurohacking is a subclass of biohacking, focused specifically on the brain. Neurohackers seek to better themselves or others by "hacking the brain" to improve reflexes, learn faster, or treat psychological disorders. The modern neurohacking movement has been around since the 1980s. However, herbal supplements have been used to increase brain function for hundreds of years. After a brief period marked by a lack of research in the area, neurohacking started regaining interest in the early 2000s. Currently, most neurohacking is performed via do-it-yourself (DIY) methods by in-home users.

Simple uses of neurohacking include the use of chemical supplements to increase brain function. More complex medical devices can be implanted to treat psychological disorders and illnesses.

== History ==
The use of mind-altering substances derived from plants dates back to ancient history. Neurohackers use a class of chemical substances that improve higher order brain functions called nootropics. The term nootropics was first proposed in 1972 by Corneliu Giurgea, a Romanian chemist from University of Bucharest.

In his study, he classified Piracetam as a nootropic and determined that nootropics should fit the following criteria:

- Enhance learning
- Resist impairing agents
- Augment informational transfer between the two hemisphere of the brain
- Heighten the brain's resistance against various forms of "aggressions"
- Improved "tonic, cortico-subcortical 'control'"
- Lack of pharmacological effects of other common psychoactive drugs.

Today, various nootropics are available via prescription and over the counter.

The 2000 study by Michael A. Nitsche and Walter Paulus at the University of Goettingen is considered to be one of the first device-oriented attempts at influencing the brain non-invasively. The study found that the motor cortex of the brain responds to weak electrical stimuli in the form of transcranial direct current stimulation (tDCS). A later study in 2003 by Branislav Savic and Beat Meier found that (tDCS) improves motor sequence learning. More recent studies have concluded that tDCS may alleviate neuropathic pain, depression, schizophrenia, and other neurological disorders. Methods of non-invasive brain stimulation (NIBS) have been found to enhance human performance. In 2019, a study funded by the US Department of Defense found that cognition and motor performance could be improved by tDCS. This investigation showed that tDCS could be used to enhance the abilities of military personnel. However, side effects such as "itching, tingling, and headaches" were noted. The study concluded that more research into adequate safety regulations is needed before it can be properly implemented.

A resurgence in the popularity of at-home and DIY neurohacking started in 2011. The recent availability of brain stimulation devices contributed to the rise in the home neurohacking movement. Individuals applied weak electrical currents to their brain in hopes of improving performance and productivity. Since 2017, neurohacking devices have been available to the general public for unsupervised use. However, these methods of neurohacking have yet to gain widespread acceptance from the general public, and user retention rate for the devices remains low.

In 2018, Marom Bikson and his colleagues at the City College of New York released a report to aid consumers in making an informed choice regarding the purchase of tDCS devices. In particular, Bikson stated that the report hoped to educate consumers on the reasons why a significant price differentiation existed across the various devices on the market.

== Technology ==
There are three main categories of neurohacking methods: oral supplements or ingestibles, procedural training exercises, and the transmission of electrical currents through the brain.

=== Oral supplements and ingestibles ===
Nootropics are any chemical compounds that cause an improvement in brain function. Although many are naturally produced by the body, ingestible supplements are often required to artificially raise the concentration of these compounds in the bloodstream to produce a significant effect. Nootropics can be further classified into two categories: synthetics nootropics and natural nootropics.

=== Synthetic nootropics ===
Synthetic nootropics refer to any lab-produced nootropics, including Piracetam. Synthetic nootropics can act at three different junctions:

1. Dopamine receptors
2. Adrenergic receptors
3. Acetylcholine and glutamate receptors

=== Natural nootropics ===
Natural, or herbal, nootropics, include food-based antioxidants and vitamin supplements. There are three main mechanisms by which natural nootropics affect brain activity:

1. Neurotransmitter modulation
2. Modulation of signal transduction
3. Vasodilation

Popular supplements such as Ginkgo biloba and Panax quinquefolius (American ginseng) are characterized as natural and herbal nootropics. Few studies have been conducted regarding the safety and long-term effects of prescribing these herbal supplements as a means of mitigating age-related cognitive decline. However, current research has indicated that these methods have the potential to alleviate the mental deterioration in older individuals.

=== Procedural training exercises ===
Procedural training methods strengthen the connections between neurons. For example, brain training games have been around since the 2000s. Companies such as PositScience, Lumosity, and CogniFit created video games designed to improve the user's brain function. These brain-training games improve neural capacity by adding game-like features to comprehension skills.

=== Transmission of electrical currents ===
There are three methods by which electrical currents are transmitted through the brain: deep brain stimulation (DBS), transcranial magnetic stimulation (TMS), and transcranial direct current stimulation (tDCS).

==== Deep brain stimulation (DBS) ====
DBS involves implanting an electrical device, or neurostimulator, into the brain. The neurostimulator is a thin wire with electrodes at its tip. Low levels of electric current are transmitted through the brain. The location where the electrodes are implanted depends on the neurological disorder being treated. The company Neuralink hopes that their DBS device will include "as many as 3072 electrodes distributed along 96 threads", and that the procedure to implant the threads would be as non-invasive as LASIK eye surgery.

==== Transcranial magnetic stimulation (TMS) ====
TMS sends short bursts of magnetic energy to the left frontal cortex through a small electromagnetic coil. Some studies have found that TMS improves cognition and motor performance. Other studies have investigated the relation between TMS and its ability to recover lost memories.

==== Transcranial direct current stimulation (tDCS) ====
Brain cells, or neurons, emit chemical signals across the gaps, or synapses, between neurons. When learning a new skill or topic, the neurons involved in understanding that particular subject are then primed to emit signals more readily. Less electrical current is required to signal the neurons to secrete the chemicals for transport across the synapse. tDCS involves running a very low current (less than 2mA) through an anode and a cathode placed on the head. The research shows that brain function improves around the anode, with no change or reduced function around the cathode.

== Applications ==
Many applications of neurohacking center around improving quality of life.

=== Mental health ===
Bettering people's mental health is one primary application of neurohacking.

Virtual reality exposure therapy is one application of neurohacking, and is being used to treat post traumatic stress. The USC Institute for Creative Technologies has been working on exposure therapy techniques since 2005, and exposure therapy is now an evidence based treatment for post traumatic stress.

Exposure therapy retrains the mind of the patient to reduce the fear associated with feeling a certain way or experiencing certain triggering stimuli. By confronting situations in a safe and controlled virtual reality environment, the patient is able to reduce the anxiety associated with those circumstances.

The FDA has approved DBS devices for the treatment of both Parkinson's disease and dystonia. There are several risks involved with this treatment, such as depression, hypomania, euphoria, mirth, and hypersexuality. However, permanent complications are rare. DBS has also been used to treat Tourette syndrome, dyskinesia epilepsy and depression, although more research is needed in these areas before it can be deemed safe.

=== Human enhancement ===
Enhancing the human experience is another application of neurohacking. Methods include simple brain-training games, chemical enhancers, and electrical brain stimulation.

Caffeine is an effective method for enhancing human performance in everyday life. Caffeine is the most popular drug in the world (humans drink a collective 1.6 billion cups of coffee per day) and is also the most popular method by which people are neurohacking. Caffeine improves memory, sociability, and alertness.

=== Information retrieval ===
The third primary application of neurohacking is information retrieval from the brain. This typically involves the use of a brain-machine interface (BMI) – an apparatus to measure electrical signals in the brain.

In 2016, researchers modeled an individual's interest in digital content by monitoring their EEG (electroencephalogram). The researchers asked the user to read Wikipedia articles. From data in the EEG, they could predict which article the user would want to read next based on the individual's expressed interest in each topic. The researchers claim this paradigm can be used to "recommend information without any explicit user interaction".

In July 2019, Neuralink – a company developing implantable brain-machine interfaces – presented their research on their high bandwidth BMI. Neuralink claims to have developed an implantable BMI device that is capable of recording and delivering full bandwidth data from the brain. The company hopes to use this technology to create a high-speed connection between the brain and digital technology, bypassing the need to type search queries or read the results.

== Legal and ethical aspects ==
=== Advertisement of brain-training software ===
The neurohacking trend has been heavily commercialized, with companies such as Lumosity and CogniFit marketing games that allegedly optimize the performances of the brain as well as alleviate the symptoms of senescence-related cognitive decline and other neurodegenerative disorders. Several studies have called into question the effectiveness of these softwares. The Federal Trade Commission (FTC) has filed claims against some companies producing brain training software for misleading marketing. Claims against Lumosity for misleading advertisement are over $2 million. Conclusive evidence regarding the effectiveness of brain training software has yet to be presented. Despite this uncertainty, the public demand for such products is rising. Sales in 2015 reached $67 million in the United States and Canada.

=== Unfair advantages ===
No governing organizations responsible for overseeing athletics and education have policies regulating neurohacking. Athletes and students can use neurohacking to gain an unfair advantage in sporting events and academic settings. Studies have indicated that neurohacking can improve memory, creativity, learning speed, muscle gain, and athletic performance. However, there are no well-developed tests or instruments capable of detecting neurohacking. Students and athletes may utilize neurohacking techniques and never be detected.

=== Side effects and potential risks ===
Most manufacturers fail to disclose the potential side effects of neurohacking devices, including significant changes to the user's self-identity and decreased reasoning skills. Affordable neurohacking devices are available online with prices ranging from $99 to $800, making them easily accessible to consumers. For instance, a "brain stimulator" device produced by the "Brain Stimulator" company that utilizes tDCS is priced $127 to $179. However, these devices are rarely regulated by the government. Using these unapproved devices with no medical supervision could cause devastating side effects. Cases have been cited where individuals physically harm others as a side effect of neurohacking.

=== Insurance claims ===
The Vercise DBS System produced by Boston Scientific Corporation is the only neurohacking medical device for sale that is approved by the Food and Drug Administration (FDA), Code of Federal Regulations (CFR), and Good Practices in Clinical Research. With the rise of DIY neurohacking, many individuals self-treat without proper supervision by a medical professional. Insurance companies deny medical insurance compensation for users who are injured using unapproved medical-grade neurohacking devices. Most neurohacking devices are uncertified and unregulated.

== See also ==
- Biohacking
- Psychonautics
- Wetware (brain)
- Neuroenhancement
- Do-it-yourself biology
