= NeuroRacer =

2013 video game

- Developer(s): University of California, San Francisco
- Director(s): Adam Gazzaley
- Release: 2013
- Genre(s): Physical therapy
- Mode(s): Single-player

NeuroRacer is a video game designed by a team of researchers at the University of California, San Francisco led by Adam Gazzaley as a way to help with mental cognition. It was designed as an "Adam Gazzaley intervention" for "top-down modulation deficits in older adults." A study on 60- to 85-year-olds showed that the multitasking nature of the game caused improvements in tasks outside of the game involving working memory and sustained attention. The game is presented as a driving simulator. Gameplay involves driving a vehicle down windy roads and pushing buttons when a sign appears.

A 2013 review concluded that there is no good medical evidence to support claims that memory training helps people improve cognitive functioning. However, Neuroracer differs from conventional "memory training" apps, in that it focuses on multi-tasking in a virtual environment.

On June 25, 2020, the University of California published an online news article entitled: "The U.S. Food and Drug Administration has approved the first video game therapeutic as a treatment for attention deficit hyperactivity disorder (ADHD) in children, based on research by UC San Francisco’s Adam Gazzaley, M.D., Ph.D."

== See also ==
- Cogmed
- Lumosity
- Posit Science Corporation
