= C19H22N4O3 =

The molecular formula C_{19}H_{22}N_{4}O_{3} (molar mass: 354.41 g/mol) may refer to:

- Iclaprim
- Neurinostat
