= Apensar =

2013 video game

Apensar: Guess the Word
- Developer: ICO Group
- Platforms: iOS; Android; Facebook; Amazon appstore
- Release: 2013
- Genres: Brain trainer, Word game
- Mode: Single-player

Apensar (aka Wordie) is a "brain trainer" mobile game, developed by ICO Group in 2013 (now known as The Fastmind). The game is available in English, Spanish, Portuguese, French and Italian. Gameplay consists of finding the common word between four images to reach the next level. It is available for iOS and Android, Amazon Appstore and Facebook.

== Game characteristics ==
The game features over 3,500 levels. To pass each level and receive coins, the user must guess the word in common between four images. If they are unsure, they can ask their contacts through social media (Facebook, Twitter, Instagram, and WhatsApp), text message, email, or pay for clues with coins.

== Reception ==
Apensar was ranked in the top 10 free games in over 30 countries, in the top 3 in the United States, and first in Venezuela. The app currently has over 20,000,000 downloads worldwide, and each player remains active, on average, for 12 minutes a day.
