= Pearson Education =

Education publishing and assessment company

- Type: Subsidiary
- Founded: 1998; 28 years ago
- Headquarters: London, England
- Area served: Worldwide
- Products: Textbooks, e-textbooks, tests, assessments
- Number of employees: c. 20,000 (2023)
- Parent: Pearson plc
- Website: pearson.com

Pearson Education (branded as Pearson since 2011) is the educational publishing and services subsidiary of the international corporation Pearson plc, formed in 1998, when Pearson plc acquired Simon & Schuster's educational business and merged it with Pearson's existing education company Addison-Wesley Longman. Pearson Education was rebranded as Pearson in 2011. In 2016, the parent corporation Pearson plc rebranded to focus solely on education publishing and services; as of 2023, Pearson Education is Pearson plc's main subsidiary.

In 2019, Pearson Education began phasing out its hard-copy textbooks in favor of digital textbooks, which were cheaper and easier to update.

As of 2023, Pearson Education has testing/teaching centers in over 55 countries worldwide; the UK and the US have the most centers. The headquarters of parent company Pearson plc are in London, England. Pearson Education's US headquarters were in Upper Saddle River, New Jersey, until the headquarters were closed at the end of 2014. Most of Pearson Education's printing is done by third-party suppliers.

== History ==
=== Early history ===
Following the British government's acquisition and nationalization of several of Pearson's aviation, fuel, and energy divisions in the early 1940s, the diversified multinational conglomerate entered the education market. It acquired the textbook publisher Longman in 1968.

In the late 1980s and 1990s, Pearson plc divested further from a number of its industries and acquired more educational publishing companies, and its education publishing operations became steadily larger and more significant. In 1988, Pearson plc purchased Addison-Wesley, the sixth-largest publisher of textbooks in the US, and merged it with Pearson's educational books subsidiary Longman to create Addison-Wesley Longman. In 1996, it acquired HarperCollins Educational Publishing and merged it with Addison-Wesley Longman.

Marjorie Scardino, who was CEO of Pearson plc from 1997 to 2013, increasingly focused the company on education, emphasizing acquisitions in the sector. In 1998, Pearson plc purchased the education division of Simon & Schuster, which included Prentice Hall, Allyn & Bacon, and parts of Macmillan Inc. including the Macmillan name. Later in 1998, Pearson merged with Simon & Schuster's educational business with Addison Wesley Longman to form Pearson Education.

Pearson Education sold and divested most of its Simon & Schuster divisions in 1999. It sold Silver Burdett Ginn Religion, a Catholic publishing division it operated under the Scott Foresman imprint, to RCL Benziger in 2007. In 2007, Pearson Education sold the Macmillan name to Holtzbrinck Publishing Group, which had purchased Macmillan Publishing Ltd. in the late 1990s.

In 2000, Pearson acquired Virtual University Enterprises, an electronic testing company founded in 1994, and renamed it Pearson VUE. According to the company, as of 2023, it delivers numerous skills tests and certification tests electronically in over 180 countries.

=== Pearson formation and rebranding ===
Pearson Education was rebranded as simply Pearson in 2011, and split into Pearson North America and Pearson International. A restructuring announced in 2013 combined Pearson North America and Pearson International into one Pearson company organised around three global lines of business: School, Higher Education, and Professional.

Following the sale of its financial news publications Financial Times and The Economist in 2015, Pearson plc rebranded in January 2016 to focus solely on education, and the corporation adopted a new logo. The logo features the interrobang (‽), a combination of a question mark and an exclamation point, to convey a "combination of excitement, curiosity and individuality" and "the excitement and fun of learning".

In late 2025, Pearson VUE announced it would rebrand as simply Pearson, with its assessment segment identified as Pearson Professional Assessments.

=== Digital transformation ===
In 2019, Pearson announced it would begin the process of phasing out the publishing of printed textbooks, in a plan to move into a more digital first strategy. E-textbooks will be updated frequently, while printed books will be updated less often. Students wanting printed books will need to rent them. As of 2019, the firm received more than half of its annual revenues from digital sales, and the US accounted for 20 percent of Pearson's annual revenue coming from courseware.

In 2019, Pearson sold its US K-12 courseware business to the private equity firm Nexus Capital Management, which rebranded it as Savvas Learning Company. In 2019, Pearson also sold its remaining 25% stake in Penguin Random House to Bertelsmann.

In 2022, Pearson Education announced that they intended to sell their digital textbooks as NFTs, in order to profit from secondhand sales.

In 2022, Pearson acquired ClutchPrep, a Miami-based edtech startup that offers sample questions, test prep and college exam prep video guides. The service has been renamed Channels.

== Imprints ==
Pearson has a number of publishing imprints, including:

- BBC Active (joint venture)
- InformIT
  - Addison-Wesley Professional
  - Adobe Press
  - Cisco Press
  - FT Press
  - Peachpit Press
  - Que Publishing
  - Sams Publishing
- Longman
- Rigby (outside the United States, where the imprint is owned by Houghton Mifflin Harcourt)
- York Notes (partnership)

== InformIT ==
InformIT, a subsidiary of Pearson Education, is an online book vendor and an electronic publisher of technology and education content. It is headquartered in Indianapolis, Indiana.

It publishes books, e-books, and videos, and its imprints include Addison-Wesley Professional, Cisco Press, Pearson IT Certification, Que Publishing, and Sams Publishing.

InformIT.com is one of the websites of the Pearson Technology Group, and one of several sites in the InformIT Network. The site features free articles, blogs, and podcasts on IT topics and products, as well as a bookstore carrying all titles from its imprints.

Other sites in the InformIT Network include Peachpit.com. Peachpit is a publisher that has been producing books on graphic design, desktop publishing, multimedia, web design and development, digital video, and general computing since 1986. Peachpit is a publishing partner for Adobe, Apple, Macromedia, and others.

In 2001, the Pearson Technology Group and O'Reilly Media LLC formed a joint partnership called Safari Books Online, to offer a web-based electronic library of technical and business books from InformIT's imprint partners and O'Reilly Media. The InformIT Network offers access to this service via its web sites. Pearson sold its interest in Safari Books Online to O'Reilly in 2014.

== Technology products ==
Pearson's products include MyMathLab and Mastering Platform.

In 2006, Pearson School Systems, a division of Pearson Education, acquired PowerSchool, a student information system, and parent portal, from Apple; terms of the deal were not disclosed. PowerSchool was a profitable product for Pearson; in 2014, it generated $97 million in revenue and $20 million in operating income. In 2015, Pearson sold PowerSchool to Vista Equity Partners for $350 million cash.

In 2007, the company developed the youth-oriented online quest game Poptropica, through its Family Education Network. In 2015, Pearson's Family Education Network, along with Poptropica, were sold to the London-based investment group Sandbox Partners.

In 2010, Pearson purchased Cogmed, a brain fitness and working memory training program founded in 1999 by Swedish researcher Torkel Klingberg. In 2019, Cogmed was transferred back to the original founders.

In 2016, Pearson acquired StatCrunch, a statistical analysis tool created by Webster West in 1997. Pearson had already been the primary distributor of StatCrunch for several years.

== Partnerships ==
In 2007, Pearson partnered with four other higher-education publishers to create CourseSmart, a company developed to sell college textbooks in eTextbook format on a common platform. In 2011, Pearson obtained a five-year, $32 million contract with the New York State Department of Education to design tests for students in grades 3–8.

Que Publishing, a publishing imprint of Pearson based out of Seattle, partnered with AARP in 2014 to develop and add to a series of technology books for seniors. The series, which includes My iPad For Seniors, and My Social Media for Seniors, are large-print and colourful.

== Criticism ==
=== Errors in tests ===
In the spring of 2012, tests that Pearson designed for the NYSED were found to contain over 30 errors, which caused controversy. One of the most prominent featured a passage about a talking pineapple on the 8th Grade ELA test (revealed to be based on Daniel Pinkwater's The Story of the Rabbit and the Eggplant, with the eggplant changed into a pineapple). After public outcry, the NYSED announced it would not count the questions in scoring. Other errors included a miscalculated question on the 8th Grade Mathematics test regarding astronomical units, a 4th grade math question with two possible correct answers, errors in the 6th grade ELA scoring guide, and over twenty errors on foreign-language math tests.

== See also ==
- Educational publishing companies
- List of largest UK book publishers
- Houghton Mifflin Harcourt
- McGraw-Hill Education
