= Synapsinostat =

Clinical data
- Other names: CN13
- Drug class: Histone deacetylase inhibitor; Cognitive enhancer
- ATC code: None

Identifiers
- IUPAC name: N-[(E)-(2-bromophenyl)methylideneamino]-N'-hydroxyheptanediamide
- PubChem CID: 42612827
- ChemSpider: 26286755

Chemical and physical data
- Formula: C_{14}H_{18}BrN_{3}O_{3}
- Molar mass: 356.220 g·mol^{−1}
- 3D model (JSmol): Interactive image
- SMILES: C1=CC=C(C(=C1)/C=N/NC(=O)CCCCCC(=O)NO)Br
- InChI: InChI=1S/C14H18BrN3O3/c15-12-7-5-4-6-11(12)10-16-17-13(19)8-2-1-3-9-14(20)18-21/h4-7,10,21H,1-3,8-9H2,(H,17,19)(H,18,20)/b16-10+; Key:ADVRIFQAHYTQJB-MHWRWJLKSA-N

Synapsinostat, also known as CN13, is a histone deacetylase (HDAC) inhibitor and possible cognitive enhancer. It potently inhibits the class I HDAC1, HDAC2, and HDAC3, with IC_{50} values of 39 nM, 41 nM, and 100 nM, respectively, whereas other HDACs were not assessed. The drug has been found to potently promote synaptogenesis in vitro. Synapsinostat was first described in the scientific literature by 2009. Subsequently, other improved analogues acting as HDAC inhibitors such as crebinostat and neurinostat, which show much greater potency, were described.

== See also ==
- Histone deacetylase inhibitor
- Crebinostat
- Neurinostat
- Vorinostat
