= Communalness =

Communalness, as suggested by Robert A. Freitas Jr., is a level of an emergent phenomenon which originates from electronic sentience, and represents a broader mode of thinking than just normal consciousness. While consciousness is limited to the individual, communalness describes a complex organization of numerous individuals which on a higher level is tightly connected to each other. Such an organization would maybe have the same intimate awareness of its own existence as a whole as people have consciousness of their own bodies.

== See also ==
- Collective consciousness
- Collective identity
- Collective intelligence
- Collective memory
- Group mind (science fiction)
- Neurohacking
