= Crebinostat =

Clinical data
- Drug class: Histone deacetylase inhibitor; Cognitive enhancer
- ATC code: None

Identifiers
- IUPAC name: N'-hydroxy-N-[(E)-(4-phenylphenyl)methylideneamino]heptanediamide
- CAS Number: 1092061-61-4
- PubChem CID: 25118059
- ChemSpider: 58863792
- ChEBI: CHEBI:125541
- ChEMBL: ChEMBL3759982

Chemical and physical data
- Formula: C_{20}H_{23}N_{3}O_{3}
- Molar mass: 353.422 g·mol^{−1}
- 3D model (JSmol): Interactive image
- SMILES: C1=CC=C(C=C1)C2=CC=C(C=C2)/C=N/NC(=O)CCCCCC(=O)NO
- InChI: InChI=1S/C20H23N3O3/c24-19(9-5-2-6-10-20(25)23-26)22-21-15-16-11-13-18(14-12-16)17-7-3-1-4-8-17/h1,3-4,7-8,11-15,26H,2,5-6,9-10H2,(H,22,24)(H,23,25)/b21-15+; Key:AEIVDBATQVVQFS-RCCKNPSSSA-N

Crebinostat is a histone deacetylase (HDAC) inhibitor and possible cognitive enhancer.

== Pharmacology ==
Crebinostat activities
Enzyme	IC_{50} (nM)
HDAC1	0.7–1.4
HDAC2	1.0–2.1
HDAC3	2.0–3.4
HDAC4	>2,000
HDAC5	>2,000
HDAC6	0.6–9.3
HDAC7	>2,000
HDAC8	>2,000
HDAC9	>2,000
HDAC10	ND
HDAC11	ND
Refs:

Crebinostat is a histone deacetylase (HDAC) inhibitor, specifically inhibiting the class I HDAC1, HDAC2, and HDAC3, the class IIb HDAC6, and weakly the class I HDAC8, with no significant inhibition of the class IIa HDAC4, HDAC5, HDAC7, or HDAC9. The drug has been found to robustly activate CREB-mediated transcription and to upregulate brain-derived neurotrophic factor (BDNF) expression and increase synaptogenesis. It has been found to enhance memory in rodents. The pharmacokinetics of crebinostat have been studied in rodents.

== Chemistry ==
The chemical synthesis of crebinostat has been described. A notable analogue of crebinostat is neurinostat.

== History ==
Crebinostat was first described in the scientific literature by 2013. It was identified via screening of a library of over 1,200 compounds designed to target HDACs. There is interest in crebinostat as a potential novel cognitive enhancer in humans. Subsequent to the development of crebinostat, an analogue known as neurinostat with improved properties was discovered and described.

== See also ==
- Histone deacetylase inhibitor
- Synapsinostat
- Neurinostat
- Vorinostat
