= Neurinostat =

Clinical data
- Drug class: Histone deacetylase inhibitor; Cognitive enhancer
- ATC code: None

Identifiers
- IUPAC name: N'-hydroxy-N-[(E)-(4-pyridin-3-ylphenyl)methylideneamino]heptanediamide
- CAS Number: 1872405-20-3
- PubChem CID: 73707550
- ChemSpider: 58863399
- ChEBI: CHEBI:125577
- ChEMBL: ChEMBL3759794

Chemical and physical data
- Formula: C_{19}H_{22}N_{4}O_{3}
- Molar mass: 354.410 g·mol^{−1}
- 3D model (JSmol): Interactive image
- SMILES: C1=CC(=CN=C1)C2=CC=C(C=C2)/C=N/NC(=O)CCCCCC(=O)NO
- InChI: InChI=1S/C19H22N4O3/c24-18(6-2-1-3-7-19(25)23-26)22-21-13-15-8-10-16(11-9-15)17-5-4-12-20-14-17/h4-5,8-14,26H,1-3,6-7H2,(H,22,24)(H,23,25)/b21-13+; Key:SOSXJHXYTVYMTE-FYJGNVAPSA-N

Neurinostat is a histone deacetylase (HDAC) inhibitor and possible cognitive enhancer.

== Pharmacology ==
Neurinostat activities
Enzyme	IC_{50} (nM)
HDAC1	1.1
HDAC2	10.8
HDAC3	0.8
HDAC4	ND
HDAC5	IA
HDAC6	0.5
HDAC7	ND
HDAC8	ND
HDAC9	ND
HDAC10	ND
HDAC11	ND
Refs:

Neurinostat is a histone deacetylase (HDAC) inhibitor and potently inhibits the class I HDAC1, HDAC2, and HDAC3 and the class IIb HDAC6, with IC_{50} values of 0.5 to 10.8 nM at the preceding HDACs, whereas no activity against the class IIa HDAC5 was observed. Activities at the class I HDAC8 and at the class IIb HDAC4, HDAC7, and HDAC9 were not assessed nor described. The pharmacokinetics of neurinostat in rodents have been studied.

== Chemistry ==
The chemical synthesis of neurinostat has been described. A notable analogue of neurinostat is crebinostat.

== History ==
Neurinostat was first described in the scientific literature by 2016. It was derived via structural modification of the earlier HDAC inhibitor crebinostat and differs from this compound only in the replacement of a phenyl ring with a pyridine ring. The drug shows enhanced potency as well as modestly improved pharmacokinetics compared to crebinostat. In addition, while potency against HDAC1 and HDAC3 was increased, neurinostat showed reduced potency at HDAC2 compared to crebinostat, thus having around 10- to 14-fold selectivity for HDAC1 and HDAC3 over HDAC2.

== See also ==
- Histone deacetylase inhibitor
- Crebinostat
- Synapsinostat
- Vorinostat
