= Internet Routing Architectures =

1997 technical book by Sam Halabi

- First-edition cover
- Author: Bassam (Sam) Halabi
- Language: English
- Subject: Internet routing, Border Gateway Protocol
- Published: April 23, 1997 (first edition); August 23, 2000 (second edition)
- Publisher: Cisco Press, New Riders
- Media type: Print and e-book
- Pages: 477 (first edition); 528 (second edition)
- ISBN: 978-1-56205-652-0 (first edition)
- OCLC: 36988820

Internet Routing Architectures is a technical book about inter-domain routing and the Border Gateway Protocol (BGP), which are part of the infrastructure of the Internet, written by Sam Halabi. Cisco Press published the first edition in 1997. A second edition followed in 2000. It explains the design and operation of networks using BGP-4, with implementation examples based on the Cisco IOS operating system.

The book has been used as a BGP reference in professional contexts, university courses, and academic research. The second edition was in its twelfth printing by May 2011, and Japanese and Chinese translations were published.

== Content ==
The first part of the book describes the development and structure of the Internet, the characteristics of Internet service providers, and IP address allocation. The second introduces interdomain routing and BGP-4. The third applies BGP to network-design problems, including route filtering, aggregation, redundancy, load balancing, large autonomous systems, and routing stability. The final part provides Cisco IOS configuration examples. The appendices contain a BGP command reference, suggestions for further reading, and material on outbound route filtering and multiprotocol BGP. The book covers both practical implementation and protocol details, including scenario-based explanations, configuration examples, and frequently asked questions.

== Publication history ==
The first edition (ISBN 978-1-56205-652-0) was published on April 23, 1997. The second edition (ISBN 978-1-57870-233-6) was published on August 23, 2000, as part of Cisco Press's Networking Technology series. It included an updated treatment of BGP-4.

In a 2006 press release marking the publisher's tenth anniversary, Cisco Press identified Internet Routing Architectures as its first book and described it as an immediate bestseller. The second edition was in its twelfth printing by May 2011.

A Japanese translation of the second edition, titled インターネットルーティングアーキテクチャ (Internet Routing Architecture), was published by SoftBank Publishing in August 2001. A revised Chinese-language second edition, Internet 路由结构, was published by People's Posts and Telecommunications Press in 2015.

== Reception ==
In a 1998 review for the ACCU, Ruben Galea gave the first edition three out of five stars. Galea described it as a comprehensive treatment of interdomain routing, noting its progression from introductory concepts to practical BGP design. He said that it would be useful to organizations providing Internet service or connecting to an Internet service provider. In 2003, Greg Hankins wrote in the USENIX magazine ;login: that it was the "BGP bible", with practical examples, and that the principles were useful beyond the Cisco-specific configurations. In The Internet Encyclopedia, Prabhaker Mateti said Halabi's book was one of two works that covered routing protocols extensively. Jisc's guidance on multihoming called it "the definitive bible" on BGP, and a TU Wien data-communications literature list also said it was the "BGP Bible".

The second edition has been used in university courses on Internet routing. A 2002 Columbia University course assigned chapters from the book for classes on addressing and routing protocols. It was also among the recommended books for a 2005 graduate seminar on network routing at Princeton University. A network-architecture course at Instituto Superior Técnico provided the first six chapters as supporting material for its unit on interdomain routing and BGP. The Barcelona School of Informatics lists the book in the basic bibliography for its Internet Protocols course.

The book has been referenced in work on operational and theoretical routing problems. A 1999 USENIX paper about the redesign of Lucent Technologies' enterprise Internet connections cited the first edition in its explanation of BGP and AS-path manipulation. Feng Wang and Lixin Gao cited the second edition in their 2003 study of routing policies between autonomous systems, and Bernard Fortz, Jennifer Rexford and Mikkel Thorup cited it in their work on traffic engineering with conventional IP routing protocols.
