= EndeavorRx =

Video game used in ADHD therapy

EndeavorRx; EndeavorOTC
- Developer: Akili Interactive Labs, Inc.
- Engine: Akili Selective Stimulus Management
- Platforms: iOS; Android
- Mode: Single-player

EndeavorRx and EndeavorOTC are video games used to treat Attention Deficit Hyperactivity Disorder developed by Akili Interactive. It was based on a prototype game called NeuroRacer that was invented by Adam Gazzaley and studied by researchers at the University of California San Francisco. The game runs on an engine known as the Akili Selective Stimulus Management engine. EndeavorRx was known as AKL-T01 or Project: EVO ADHD Treatment during its development. On June 15, 2020, it became the first ever video game to be cleared by the FDA. It was approved to be used as a treatment for children with ADHD with the age range of 8–12. Five studies on over 600 children were conducted to measure the effectiveness of EndeavorRx. They found "a 36% improvement in at least one objective measure of attention." The side effects found by the researchers include frustration, dizziness, headaches, and aggression.

In the game, the player is tasked with flying a spaceship across many levels. The player is faced with numerous tasks such as finding collectibles or catching animals. The game will alter its objectives based on the player's performance. It may add new rewards and objectives or modify the game's pace in accordance with the pace of the player. EndeavorRx and EndeavorOTC attempts to challenge the player and force them to learn to multitask and ignore distractions. Although both EndeavorRx and EndeavorOTC can be downloaded for mobile devices, EndeavorRX cannot be played without a prescription from a pediatrician while EndeavorOTC is sold over the counter and can be played without a prescription although it is used for adults and not children. It is recommended that the game should be played for 25 minutes a day, 5 days a week, for 4 weeks. Once the game has been played for the allotted time it will not let the player continue.

On June 7, 2023, Akili announced that the video game will be released as an OTC for Adults with ADHD. The game received FDA Approval a year later on June 18, 2024.
