= Adam Gazzaley =

American neuroscientist (born 1968)

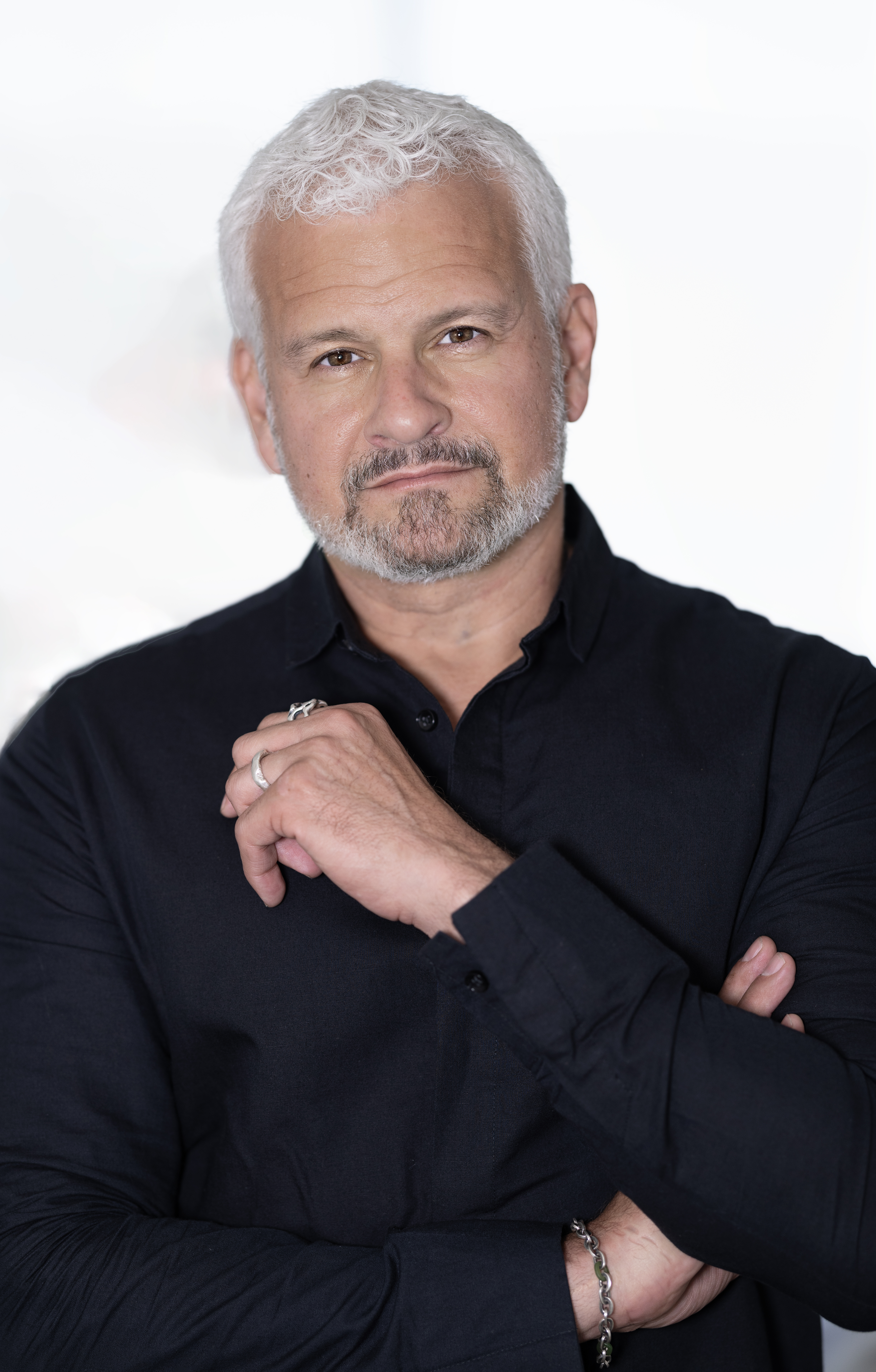
- Born: Adam Gazzaley; December 29, 1968 (age 57); Brooklyn, New York, U.S.
- Education: Binghamton University, Mount Sinai School of Medicine
- Spouse: Jo Gazzaley (m. 2016)
- Scientific career
- Fields: Neuroscience
- Workplaces: University of California, San Francisco

Adam Gazzaley (born December 29, 1968) is an American neuroscientist, author, photographer, entrepreneur and inventor. He is the founder and executive director of Neuroscape and the David Dolby Distinguished Professor of Neurology, Physiology, and Psychiatry at University of California, San Francisco (UCSF). He is co-founder and chief science advisor of Akili Interactive Labs and JAZZ Venture Partners. Gazzaley is the inventor of the first video game approved by the FDA as a medical treatment. He is a board of trustee member, science council member and fellow of the California Academy of Sciences. He has authored over 200 scientific articles.

== Career ==
=== Early life ===
Gazzaley graduated from the Bronx High School of Science in 1986. He received a Bachelor of Science degree in biochemistry from Binghamton University in 1990, followed by MD and PhD degrees in neuroscience through the NIH-sponsored Medical Scientist Training Program at the Mount Sinai School of Medicine in New York. His doctoral research on plasticity of glutamate receptors in the hippocampus and implications for cognitive changes in normal aging earned him the 1997 Krieg Cortical Scholar Award. He completed an internship in internal medicine (1998–1999) and residency in neurology (1999–2002) at the University of Pennsylvania Health System.

Following residency in 2002, Gazzaley had a research fellowship at the University of California, Berkeley, and simultaneously worked as attending neurologist at the Northern California VA Medical Center, UCSF Medical Center and completed a clinical fellowship in cognitive neurology at the University of California, San Francisco Memory and Aging Center where he became board-certified in neurology.

=== Research ===
Gazzaley founded Gazzaley Lab in 2006, the UCSF Neuroscience Imaging Center in 2007, and the Neuroscape Lab in 2014 at UCSF. His research approach uses a combination of human neurophysiological tools, including functional magnetic resonance imaging (fMRI), electroencephalography (EEG) and transcranial stimulation (TES). His work focuses on the role of top-down modulation as the neural connection between attention and working memory, with an emphasis on how this is impacted by aging. Among his notable scientific contributions is showing that healthy older adults exhibit deficits in suppressing distractions and multitasking, which relates to their working memory abilities. These results have been interpreted as an underlying neural mechanism of “the senior moment”.

Gazzaley's translational studies have explored how cognitive abilities may be enhanced via engagement with custom designed, closed-loop video games, neurofeedback and transcranial stimulation. In 2009 he designed a video game, NeuroRacer, which was shown to improve working memory and sustained attention in older adults in a study published as a September 2013 cover story in the journal Nature. After a decade of development and clinical trials, this became the first video game approved by the FDA as a medical treatment.

In 2016, he merged Gazzaley Lab, the Neuroscience Imaging Center and Neuroscape Lab into a research center, Neuroscape, which serves as a platform to develop and validate approaches that assess and optimize brain function of healthy and impaired individuals. With his team at Neuroscape, Gazzaley continues to advance the role of interactive experiences delivered through closed-loop video games to improve cognition; an approach he has coined Experiential Medicine. Beneficial effects of Neuroscape’s video games have been reported in both older and younger adults: Meditrain, Body Brain Trainer, Coherence and Labyrinth.

Gazzaley and colleagues at Neuroscape developed the award-winning GlassBrain, a 3D MRI brain visualization that displays overlaid rhythmic brain activity in real-time using EEG recordings in collaboration with Mickey Hart and scientists at UCSD.

=== Industry ===
In 2001, Gazzaley founded his first company, Wanderings Inc, to sell fine art prints of his nature photography.

In 2011, Gazzaley co-founded Akili Interactive Labs, a company that develops, validates and distributes digital medicine via scientifically validated video games, and serves as a science advisor. On June 15, 2020, Akili's EndeavorRx was FDA-authorized as a prescription treatment for children with ADHD. This landmark event marked the first FDA-authorized digital treatment for ADHD, and the first video game approved by the FDA as the treatment of any medical condition. It was reviewed through FDA's de novo pathway and so its clearance creates a new regulatory classification of medicine.

In 2015, he co-founded JAZZ Venture Partners, a venture capital firm investing in experiential technology to improve human performance, and served as its chief scientist until 2024.

In 2016, Gazzaley co-founded Sensync, a company creating a sensory immersion vessel to offer a novel wellness treatment called the Deep Brain Massage. He served as its chief science advisor until 2021 when the company was dissolved.

== Public and media appearances ==
Gazzaley has delivered over 800 invited talks worldwide on his research and perspectives. His public speaking has been recognized by receiving the 2015 Science Educator Award by the Society for Neuroscience.

He has been profiled in The New York Times, The New Yorker, The Wall Street Journal, Time, Discover, Wired, PBS, NPR, CNN, NBC Nightly News, The Today Show, and Good Morning America. In 2013, he wrote and hosted the nationally televised, PBS-sponsored special, "The Distracted Mind with Dr. Adam Gazzaley". In 2014, he co-hosted TEDMED. He has appeared in TV documentaries.

== Awards and honors ==
- 1997 Krieg Cortical Kudos- Cortical Scholar Award
- 2005 Cermak Award
- 2015 Elected Membership in American Society for Clinical Investigation
- 2015 Society for Neuroscience – Science Educator Award
- 2017 Prose Award
- 2020 Fellow of the California Academy of Sciences
- 2020 Global Gaming Citizen Honor
- 2021 Newsweek's inaugural list of America's Greatest Disruptors
- 2022 Fast Company's list of the World's Most Innovative Companies
- 2022 AURORA Institute Prize

== Works ==
=== Book ===
Gazzaley authored The Distracted Mind: Ancient Brains in a High-Tech World, along with Dr. Larry Rosen. It was published by MIT Press in October 2016. ISBN 978-0-262-03494-4 It won the 2017 Prose Award in the category of Biomedicine and Neuroscience.

=== Select research articles ===
- Gazzaley, A. H.; Siegel, S. J.; Kordower, J. H.; Mufson, E. J.; Morrison, J. H. (1996). "Circuit-specific alterations of N-methyl-D-aspartate receptor subunit 1 in the dentate gyrus of aged monkeys". Proceedings of the National Academy of Sciences of the United States of America. 93 (7): 3121–5. Bibcode:1996PNAS...93.3121G. doi:10.1073/pnas.93.7.3121. PMC 39772. PMID 8610179.
- Gazzaley, Adam; Cooney, Jeffrey W; Rissman, Jesse; d'Esposito, Mark (2005). "Top-down suppression deficit underlies working memory impairment in normal aging". Nature Neuroscience. 8 (10): 1298–300. doi:10.1038/nn1543. PMID 16158065. S2CID 205430780.
- Clapp, W. C.; Rubens, M. T.; Sabharwal, J.; Gazzaley, A. (2011). "Deficit in switching between functional brain networks underlies the impact of multitasking on working memory in older adults". Proceedings of the National Academy of Sciences. 108 (17): 7212–7. Bibcode:2011PNAS..108.7212C. doi:10.1073/pnas.1015297108. JSTOR 41242155. PMC 3084135. PMID 21482762.
- Zanto, Theodore P; Rubens, Michael T; Thangavel, Arul; Gazzaley, Adam (2011). "Causal role of the prefrontal cortex in top-down modulation of visual processing and working memory". Nature Neuroscience. 14 (5): 656–61. doi:10.1038/nn.2773. PMC 3083493. PMID 21441920.
- Anguera, J. A.; Boccanfuso, J.; Rintoul, J. L.; Al-Hashimi, O.; Faraji, F.; Janowich, J.; Kong, E.; Larraburo, Y.; Rolle, C.; Johnston, E.; Gazzaley, A. (2013). "Video game training enhances cognitive control in older adults". Nature. 501 (7465): 97–101. Bibcode:2013Natur.501...97A. doi:10.1038/nature12486. PMC 3983066. PMID 24005416.
- Mishra, Jyoti; De Villers-Sidani, Etienne; Merzenich, Michael; Gazzaley, Adam (2014). "Adaptive Training Diminishes Distractibility in Aging across Species". Neuron. 84 (5): 1091–103. doi:10.1016/j.neuron.2014.10.034. PMC 4264379. PMID 25467987.
- Ziegler, DA; Simon, AJ; Gallen, CL; Skinner, S; Janowich, JR; Volpini, JJ; Rolle, CE; Mishra, J; Kornfield, J; Anguera, JA; Gazzaley, A (2019). "Closed-loop Digital Meditation Improves Sustained Attention in Young Adults". Nature Human Behaviour. 3 (7): 746–757. doi:10.1038/s41562-019-0611-9. PMC 7534732. PMID 31160812.
