= Cisco Press =

Publisher

- Parent company: Cisco Systems; Pearson Education
- Status: Active
- Founded: 1996
- Country of origin: United States
- Headquarters location: Indianapolis, Indiana
- Publication types: Books; Practice tests; Software; Videos
- Nonfiction topics: Networking technology; Certification study materials
- Official website: www.ciscopress.com

Cisco Press is a publishing alliance between Cisco Systems and Pearson Education, the world's largest education publishing and technology company which is part of Pearson plc. Cisco Press distributes its titles through traditional resellers as well as through the O'Reilly Online Learning e-reference service. Cisco Press allows Cisco Systems to publish books about Cisco networking technology, as well as certification study materials. Cisco Press's first book, Internet Routing Architectures, was published in 1997.
