= Historical game studies =

Historical game studies is the academic field that covers the representation and use of historical materials, concepts and ideas in games. It therefore overlaps the fields of history, especially subfields such as reception of the past, and game studies.

Games often use historical material to appeal to audiences and provide particular aesthetics and ideas within game-worlds. This sometimes involves using an entirely historical premise but might also mean using historically inspired elements such as the large contribution of medievalisms to the fantasy genre. There is also often interest in the use of games in teaching contexts for history, which is another driver behind interest in historical game studies.

== Development ==
A number of approaches to historical games may be traced before the development of the academic field in full. Multiple scholars have especially suggested William Uricchio's 2005 paper 'Simulation, History, and Computer Games' as a key early example of a historical game studies approach: the field then developed more strongly in the early to mid 2010s, including the foundation of specific academic networks and events. A further milestone was the 2013 volume Playing With the Past, edited by Matthew Wilhelm Kapell and Andrew B. R. Elliott, which historian Esther Wright cited as "the first defined space that assembled a (large) cohort interested in how the past was represented, and how history was expressed, through digital games".

A parallel, and older, branch of Historical Game Studies stems from work stretching back well into the 1980s on how and why to effectively use historical games, not least of all digital games, in secondary and university-level history education. Articles in History Microcomputer Review took the lead in the 1980s. The first monograph focused on using video games as effective pedagogies in history education was Jeremiah McCall's 2011 Gaming the Past: Using Video Games to Teach Secondary History, since published in a second edition in 2022.

A number of organisations and bodies exist for the furtherance of historical game studies. Perhaps the first and most prominent of these is the Historical Games Network (initially the Historical Game Studies Network) which was set up in 2014-15. Other initiatives focus on specific historical periods, such as the Middle Ages in Modern Games conference series.

== Theoretical approaches and concepts ==
The distinction between approaches focused on accuracy (the extent to which a game or game element precisely replicates a historical situation) and authenticity (the extent to which a game or game element feels like it represents a situation to the audience) is a common theoretical starting point for historical game studies.

Prominent scholars in the field have tended to reject accuracy as a strict metric, citing that the importance of games is in the impact on players and the ways that games contribute to mythologising and building new understandings of the past. However, authenticity has been noted as being 'nebulous' and difficult to assess because of its subjective nature and the difficulty of proving particular impacts. Furthermore, some scholars have noted the importance of measures that ensure accuracy in building and retaining feelings of authenticity for parts of the player community.

A further common theory, more specific to games with fully historical settings, is differentiating reconstructionist, constructionist, and deconstructionist games. Reconstructionist games are those that assume a singular, real past, associated with realist simulation, recreating specific situations with very high fidelity, especially visually. This happens in for example the more historical elements of the Assassin's Creed game series. Constructionist games attempt to recreate the mechanisms and processes of history, as for example in the Crusader Kings series, and are associated with a more conceptual simulation style. A rarer category of deconstructionist games such as Pentiment gamify and take into account questions of sourcing and historical memory to call the basis of a player's historical knowledge into question.

Historical game studies also uses and develops frameworks for thinking about the player's position within a game in a historical context, most notably Jeremiah McCall's Historical Problem Space approach which focuses on how a game provides a player with a good (or bad) representation of the choices available to historical actors.

Approaches based around ethnic or national identity are also common in historical game studies. Particular conceptions of history are often important in constructing modern ideas about gender or nationality and their origins, and these can be transmitted through game media. Related historical dynamics that still have strong resonances in the present and may be played out in games, such as colonisation and postcolonial processes, can also be of particularly significant interest to scholars seeking to question how games interact with modern understandings of the past.
