= Bob De Schutter =

Belgian video game designer

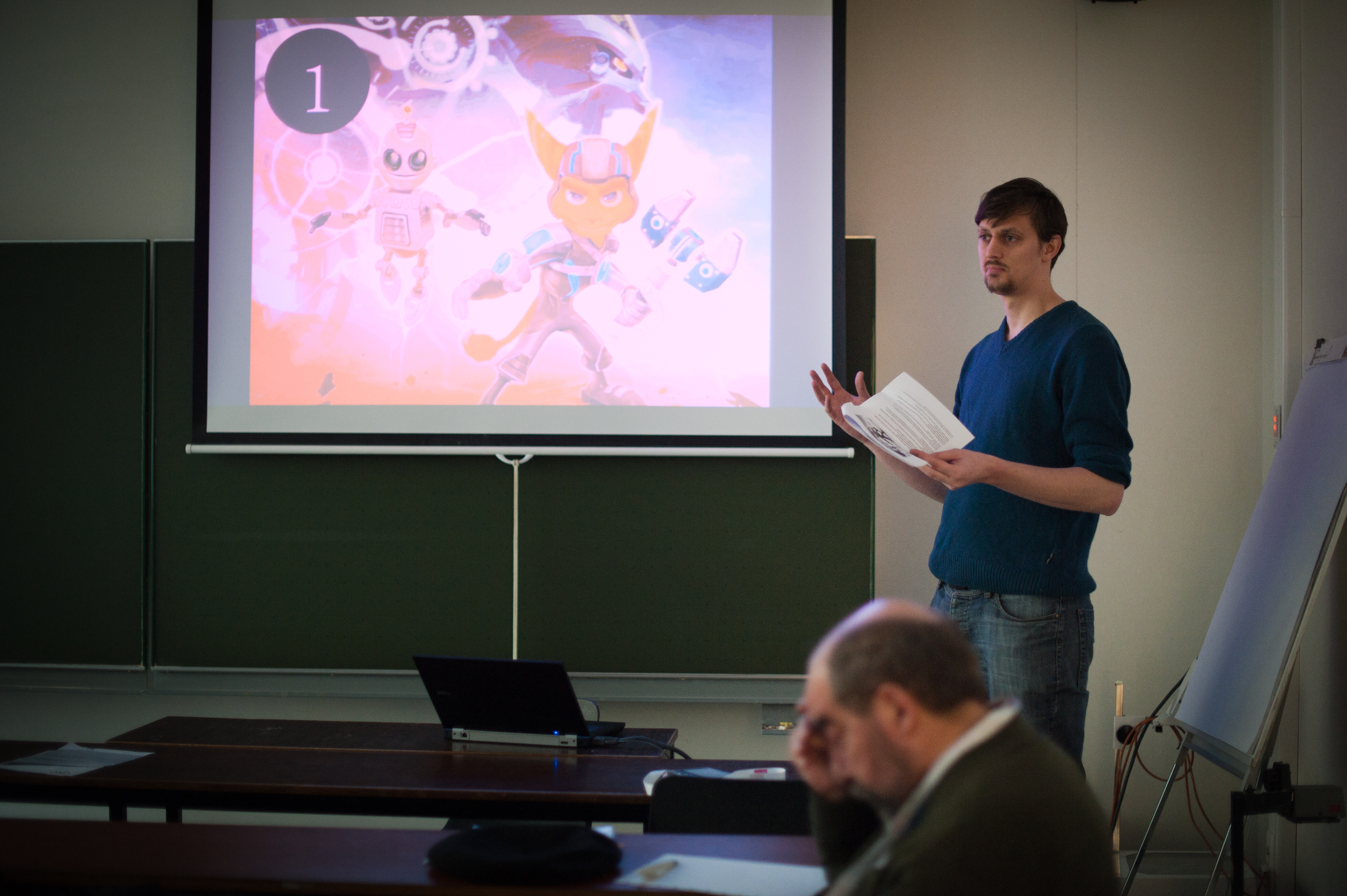
- De Schutter at the 2011 CHI Belgium Barcamp
- Born: 1981 (age 44–45); Belgium
- Education: Katholieke Universiteit Leuven, Karel de Grote-Hogeschool
- Occupations: Video game designer, researcher, professor
- Employer: Miami University
- Known for: Game Design for Older Adults
- Title: C. Michael Armstrong Professor of Applied Game Design
- Website: www.bobdeschutter.be

Bob De Schutter is a Belgian video game designer and researcher, who is the C. Michael Armstrong professor of Applied Game Design at Miami University (Oxford, Ohio). He is best known for his work on the design of video games for players in middle through late adulthood. He has advocated the importance of play in later life and has spoken out against the stereotyping of older video game players in marketing and game design. He has also published on the design of experimental classrooms for gameful instruction.

== Education ==
De Schutter graduated from the Karel de Grote-Hogeschool (Antwerp, Belgium) in 2003 with an MA in Visual Arts, and in 2011 he received his Ph.D. in the Social Sciences from the Katholieke Universiteit Leuven (Leuven, Belgium). His doctoral thesis was on "The meaning of digital games to an older audience".

== Career ==
From 2007 until 2012 De Schutter was a researcher, teacher and game designer for the e-Media Lab of the Katholieke Universiteit Leuven (campus Group T), where he worked on games to facilitate inter-generational knowledge transfer, rehabilitate psycho-motor skills, train entrepreneurial skills, sensitize university students on urban mobility for the disabled and teach the psychology of game design. At Miami University, he worked on an interactive app about Freedom Summer.

De Schutter founded the Flemish Chapter of the Digital Games Research Association and chaired its executive board until May 2013. He is an honorary member of DiGRA Flanders.

Since August 2013, he is the C. Michael Armstrong Professor at the College of Education, Health & Society and the Armstrong Institute for Interactive Media Studies of Miami University (Oxford, Ohio). He is also a research fellow at the Scripps Gerontology Center.

In 2014, De Schutter became the founding president of the Gerontoludic Society.

De Schutter was one of the speakers at South by Southwest in 2013 in a panel on "Designing Games for Realism". He spoke at TEDxMiami University on April 25, 2015. He presented at the main conference of the Game Developers Conference in San Francisco with a talk called "Beyond Ageism: Designing Meaningful Games for an Older Audience". He has organized several workshops on game design for older adults.

He is a lifetime member of the International Game Developers Association and a board member of the International Society for Gerontechnology.

He is currently an associate professor at Northeastern University, holding a joint appointment with the College of Arts, Media and Design and Khoury College of Computer Sciences.

== Selected publications ==
De Schutter has published more than 30 peer-reviewed research papers in areas such as design, communication, education, media studies and technology.

Some selected works can be found below:

=== Games and ageing ===
- De Schutter, B., Vanden Abeele, V. (2015). "Towards a Gerontoludic Manifesto". Anthropology & Aging: Journal of the Association of Anthropology & Gerontology, 36(2), 112-120.
- De Schutter, B., Brown, J. A., Vanden Abeele. V. (2014). "The domestication of digital games in the lives of older adults". New Media & Society, 17(7), 1-17.
- De Schutter, B., Malliet. S. (2014). "The Older Player of Digital Games: A Classification Based on Perceived Need Satisfaction". Communications: The European Journal of Communication Research, 39(1), 66-88.
- Vanden Abeele, V. & De Schutter, B. (2010). "Designing intergenerational play via enactive interaction, competition and acceleration". Personal and Ubiquitous Computing, 14(5), 425-433.
- De Schutter, B. (2010). "Never Too Old to Play: The Appeal of Digital Games to an Older Audience". Games and Culture: A Journal of Interactive Media, 6(2), 155-170.
- De Schutter, B., & Vanden Abeele, V. (2008). "Meaningful Play in Elderly Life". Presented at the Annual Meeting of the International Communication Association, Quebec, Montreal, Canada.

=== Gameful instruction ===
- De Schutter, B., & Papa, S. (2015). "Return of Gradequest - Evaluating the Third Iteration of a Gameful Course". Foundations of Digital Games, Pacific Grove, CA.
- De Schutter, B. (2014). "The Gradequest Tale of Scrotie McBoogerballs - Evaluating the Second Iteration of a Gameful Undergraduate Course". Meaningful Play, East Lansing, Michigan.
- De Schutter, B. (2014). "Gradequest Strikes Back - The development of the second iteration of a gameful undergraduate course". Games+Learning+Society 10, Madison, WI: ETC Press.
- De Schutter, B., & Vanden Abeele, V. (2014). "Gradequest — Evaluating the impact of using game design techniques in an undergraduate course". Foundations of Digital Games 2014, Fort Lauderdale, FL.
