= Transcranial stimulation =

Transcranial stimulation may refer to:

- Transcranial magnetic stimulation (TMS or rTMS or deep TMS)
- Transcranial direct current stimulation (tDCS)
- Transcranial alternating current stimulation (tACS)
- Transcranial pulsed ultrasound (TPU)
- Transcranial focused ultrasound stimulation (tFUS)
- Cranial electrotherapy stimulation (CES), also called transcranial electrotherapy

== See also ==
- Electro stimulation (disambiguation)
