= Lumosity =

Brain training program (launched 2007)

- Website type: Public
- Available in: English, Spanish, German, French, Japanese, Korean, Portuguese
- Key people: Bob Schafer (CEO); Krishna Kakarala (Executive Chairman of the board)
- Revenue: $23.7 million (2012)
- Website: www.lumosity.com
- Commercial: Yes
- Registration: Required
- Launched: 2007
- Current status: Active

Lumosity is an online program consisting of games claiming to improve memory, attention, flexibility, speed of processing, and problem solving.

== History ==
Lumos Labs was founded in 2005 by Kunal Sarkar, Michael Scanlon, and David Drescher. Lumosity.com launched in 2007 and, as of January 2015, has 70 million members.

== Financials ==
The company raised $400,000 in capital from angel investors in 2007, a Series A of $3 million from Harrison Metal Capital, FirstMark Capital and Norwest Venture Partners in 2008, a Series C of $32.5 million led by Menlo Ventures, and a Series D of $31.5 million led by Discovery Communications with participation from existing investors.

== Effectiveness and legal history ==
On January 5, 2016, Lumos Labs agreed to a $50 million settlement (reduced to $2 million subject to financial verification) to the Federal Trade Commission over claims of false advertising for their product. The Commission found that Lumosity's marketing "preyed on consumers' fears about age-related cognitive decline, suggesting their games could stave off memory loss, dementia, and even Alzheimer's disease", without providing any scientific evidence to back its claims. The company was ordered not to make any claims that its products can "[improve] performance in school, at work, or in athletics" or "[delay or protect] against age-related decline in memory or other cognitive function, including mild cognitive impairment, dementia, or Alzheimer's disease", or "[reduce] cognitive impairment caused by health conditions, including Turner syndrome, post-traumatic stress disorder (PTSD), attention deficit hyperactivity disorder (ADHD), traumatic brain injury (TBI), stroke, or side effects of chemotherapy", without "competent and reliable scientific evidence".

In December 2025, the FDA granted 510(k) clearance for Lumosity Rx, a prescription digital therapeutic app designed to improve attention in adults ages 22–55 with attention deficit hyperactivity disorder (ADHD). The app will use 13 cognitive games to target inattentive and combined-type ADHD. Lumosity Rx was cleared under the name Prismira but will be marketed as Lumosity Rx.

Medical evidence to support claims that memory training helps people improve cognitive functioning typically show near transfer (improvement on related trained skills), but weaker evidence for far transfer (broad intelligence, real-world cognition, or generalized executive enhancement).

== See also ==
- Brain training
- Cogmed
- NeuroRacer
- Posit Science Corporation
