= Ludic interface =

Computer interface

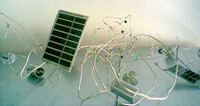
Student experiment in Interface Design developed at UP Valencia

A ludic interface is an inherently "playful" type of computer interface. This field of human–computer interaction research and design draws on concepts introduced by Dutch historian and cultural theorist Johan Huizinga in the book Homo Ludens ("Man the Player" or "Playing Man"). Huizinga's work is considered an important contribution to the development of game studies.

The various tools and concepts associated with ludic interface development differ from mainstream technological systems that employ human computer interfacing and interaction. Ludic interfaces tend to be more playful, are user-generated and user-driven, flexible, low-cost and cooperative. Such interfaces are often experimental and draw upon methods and knowledge from video game design, interactive media, modding cultures, media conversion, and social networking. The goal of ludic interface design is to create interfacing technology that offers ease of use and is inherently playful.

== Core concept ==
At its core, "ludic interfaces" is a subcategory of interfaces in general. The notion is not restricted to electronics or human–computer interaction, even if the terminology was developed in respect to digital technology. Various authors suggest to use the term "ludic interfaces" for non-digital phenomena, e.g. architectural facades, skins, wearable computers, media art. "Ludic Interfaces" is also a Masters programme development on a European level. It is the title of a European collaboration in creating a network of academic institutions and of world leading media centres to investigate, design and test publicly shared digital content. The programme development is a joint project by the University of Potsdam, Universidad Politécnica de Valencia, Universität für künstlerische und industrielle Gestaltung in Linz, and by the University of Salford in Greater Manchester.

== History ==
Ludic interface design was first defined in 2002 by William Gaver, in "Designing for Homo Ludens", expanded in a later article in 2009.

The term was revisited in 2008 by International Symposium on Electronic Art) curators Gunalan Nadarajan and Vladimir Todorović to describe a panel section of ISEA2008 in Singapore. The term was introduced with the aim of counterbalancing the tendency of "infantilization of play" and stressing the "complicities between technology and pleasure".

In the same year a group of game artists and scholars at Leuphana University in Lueneburg started lecturing and writing about the theory of ludic interfaces and applied for a European grant to develop a Masters programme in Ludic Interfaces. The application was successful and the development has successfully been completed in 2013.

The notion of "ludic interfaces" has also historical roots in artistic practice and analysis of interfaces (cf. Christa Sommerer, Laurent Mignonneau), the notion of "playfulness" as a design and arts strategy, or the "Ludic Society" arts organisation.

== Examples ==
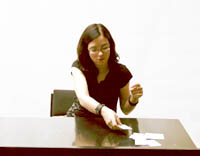
Ludic interface experiment by student Jess Kilby from University of Salford, using RFID tag technology for a digital tarot reader.

Ludic interface by Mathias Fuchs, using Djing tools in combination with a game engine: "postvinyl"

Jess Kilby's RFID Tarot table consists of a hand-painted black table with letters and signs drawn upon it, and a white set of cards containing radio-frequency tags. The installation is an example for a ludic set-up where the interface contributes significantly to the magic of the game. Hidden information within the blank cards allows the RFID reader, a digital tarot reader automaton, to interpret information hidden from the human eye. Kilby's system interprets the information contained within the cards and displays videos of a frightening future. The game could certainly be implemented as a Flash simulation or be built for a 2D monitor display system, but without the materiality of the ludic interface, without the special lighting, and without the artist dressed in a fortune teller's dress the game would not work at all. The same holds true for Mary Flanagan's "Giant Joystick". It is the interface with all its materiality, erotic connotations and haptic features which makes the ludic installation work so well. Ludic interfaces can also facilitate play in a musical sense. The "postvinyl" performance, originally commissioned by futuresonic festival Manchester in 2004 recontextualizes a computer game in a performance environment.
