= Posit Science Corporation =

American software company

- Type: Private
- Founded: 2002; 24 years ago
- Founders: Jeffrey Zimman; Michael Merzenich
- Headquarters: San Francisco, California, U.S.
- Area served: Worldwide
- Website: www.brainhq.com

Posit Science Corporation is an American company providing brain training software and services.

Originally known as Neuroscience Solutions Corporation, the company was founded in 2002 by neuroscientists Michael Merzenich and Henry Mahncke, who originally intended to help people with schizophrenia. It was renamed Posit Science Corporation in January, 2005.

Between 2002 and 2011, the company received about $36 million in funding from venture capitalists and others. During that time, its customers and funding sources included the U.S. Department of Defense and the National Institutes of Health, as well as insurance companies Group Health Cooperative, The Hartford, and Allstate. It grew to have 86 employees in 2007 and then cut staff to 11 by 2011, since revenue was not meeting their expectations.

The field of brain training has been driven by advertising making strong claims. Starting in January 2015, the United States Federal Trade Commission (FTC) sued companies selling "brain training" programs or other products marketed as improving cognitive function, including WordSmart Corporation, the company that makes Lumosity, for deceptive advertising and later that year the FTC also sued LearningRx; Posit was not sued by the FTC.

A 2016 review of studies in the field found that there was some evidence that some of brain training programs improved performance on tasks in which users were trained, less evidence that improvements in performance generalize to related tasks, and almost no evidence that brain training generalizes to everyday cognitive performance; in addition most clinical studies were flawed.

In 2017, a group of Australian scientists undertook a systematic review of what studies have been published of commercially available brain training programs in an attempt to give consumers and doctors credible information on which brain training programs are actually scientifically proved to work. Unfortunately, after reviewing close to 8,000 studies about brain training programs marketed to healthy older adults that were studied, most programs had no peer reviewed published evidence of their efficacy and of the seven brain training programs that did, only two of those had multiple studies, including at least one study of high quality: BrainHQ (from Posit Science) and CogniFit.
