= Neuroenhancement =

Extension of cognition in the healthy

Neuroenhancement or cognitive enhancement is the experimental use of pharmacological or non-pharmacological methods intended to improve cognitive and affective abilities in healthy people who don't have any mental illness. Agents or methods of neuroenhancement are intended to affect cognitive, social, psychological, mood, or motor benefits beyond normal functioning.

Pharmacological neuroenhancement agents may include compounds thought to be nootropics, such as modafinil, caffeine, and other drugs used for treating people with neurological disorders.

Non-pharmacological measures of cognitive enhancement may include behavioral methods (activities, techniques, and changes), non-invasive brain stimulation, which has been used with the intent to improve cognitive and affective functions, and brain-machine interfaces.

== Potential agents ==
There are many supposed nootropics, most having only small effect sizes in healthy individuals. Neuroenhancement's most common pharmacological agents include modafinil and methylphenidate (Ritalin). Stimulants in general and various dementia treatments or other neurological therapies may also affect cognition.

Neuroenhancement may also occur from:

- mood ('mood enhancement')
- motivation
- sociability (e.g., talking-related or empathy)
- creativity
- cognitive endurance
- psychological resilience

Enhancers are multidimensional and can be clustered into biochemical, physical, and behavioral enhancement strategies.

=== Modafinil ===
Approved for treating narcolepsy, obstructive sleep apnea, and shift work sleep disorder, modafinil is a wakefulness-promoting drug used to decrease fatigue, increase vigilance, and reduce daytime sleepiness. Modafinil improves alertness, attention, long-term memory, and daily performance in people with sleep disorders.

In sustained sleep deprivation, repeated use of modafinil helped individuals maintain higher levels of wakefulness than a placebo, but did not help attention and executive function. Modafinil may impair one's self-monitoring ability; a common trend found in research studies indicated that participants rated their performances on cognitive tests higher than it was, suggesting an "overconfidence" effect.

=== Methylphenidate ===
Methylphenidate (MPH), also known as Ritalin, is a stimulant that is used to treat attention-deficit hyperactivity disorder (ADHD). MPH is abused by a segment of the general population, especially university students.

A comparison between the sales of MPH to the number of people for whom it was prescribed revealed a disproportionate ratio, indicating high abuse. MPH may impair cognitive performance.

=== Others ===
Studies are too preliminary to determine whether there are any cognitive-enhancing effects of agents such as memantine or acetylcholinesterase inhibitors (examples: donepezil, galantamine).

=== Possible adverse effects ===
Common drugs intended for neuroehancement are typically well-tolerated by healthy people. These drugs are already in mainstream use to treat people with different kinds of psychiatric disorders.

Assessment to determine potential adverse effects are drop-out rates and subjective rating. The drop-out rates were minimal or non-existent for donepezil, memantine, MPH, and modafinil. In the drug trials, participants reported the following adverse reactions to use of donepezil, memantine, MPH, modafinil or caffeine: gastrointestinal complaints (nausea), headache, dizziness, nightmares, anxiety, drowsiness, nervousness, restlessness, sleep disturbances, and insomnia, diuresis. The side effects normally ceased in the course of treatment. Various factors, such as dosage, timing and concurrent behavior, may influence the onset of adverse effects.

== Non-pharmacological ==
=== Neurostimulation ===
Neurostimulation methods are being researched and developed. Results indicate that details of the stimulation procedures are crucial, with some applications impairing rather than enhancing cognition and questions are being raised about whether this approach can deliver any meaningful results for cognitive domains. Stimulation methods include electrical stimulation, magnetic stimulation, optical stimulation with lasers, several forms of acoustic stimulation, and physical methods like forms of neurofeedback.

=== Software and media ===
Applications of augmented reality technologies may affect general memory enhancement, extending perception and learning-assistance. The Internet may be considered a tool for enabling or extending cognition. However, it is not "a simple, uniform technology, [n]either in its composition, [n]or in its use" and, as "an informational resource, currently fails to enhance cognition", partly due to issues that include information overload, misinformation and persuasion.

== Quality and social issues ==
=== Validation and quality control ===
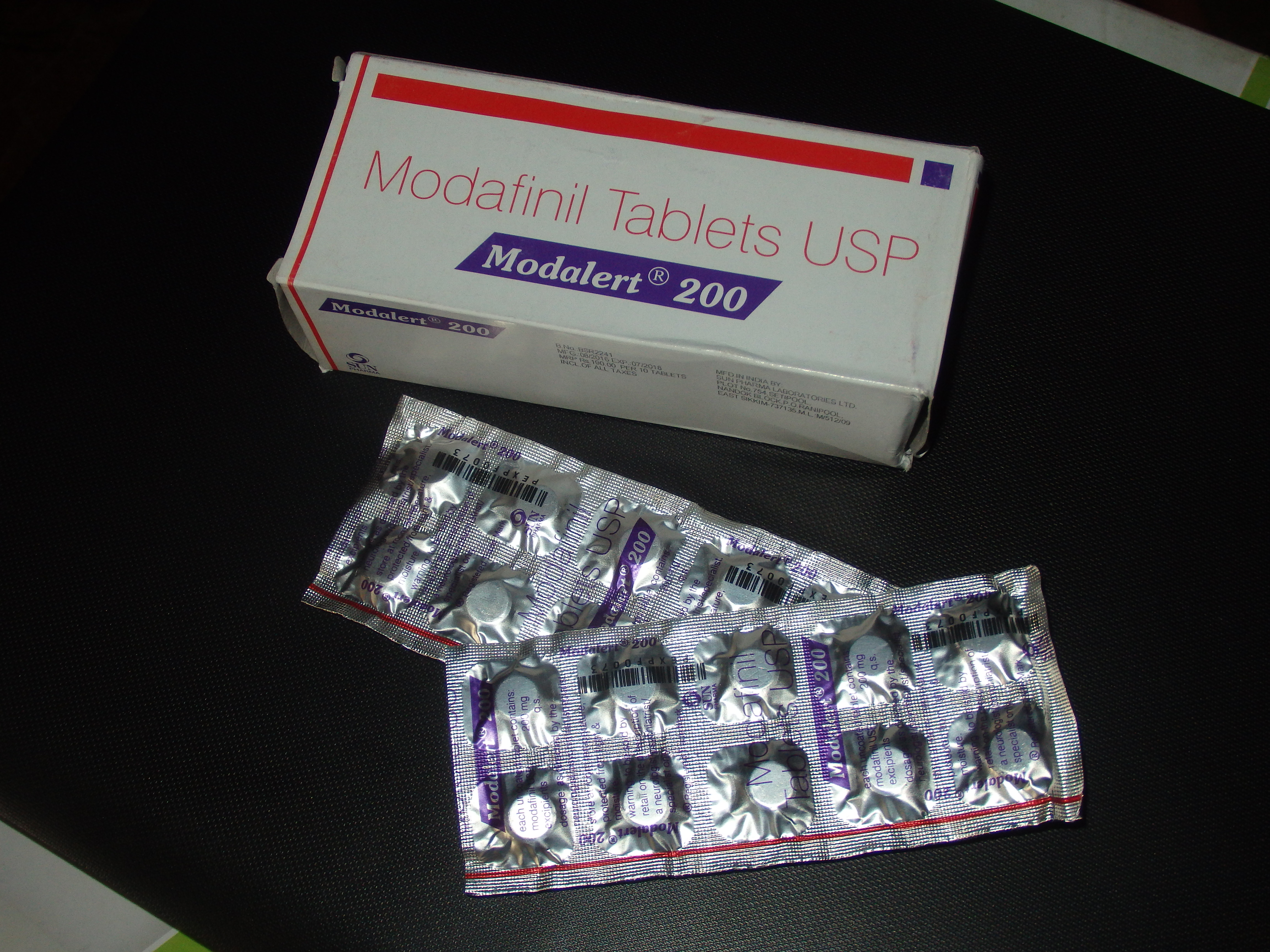

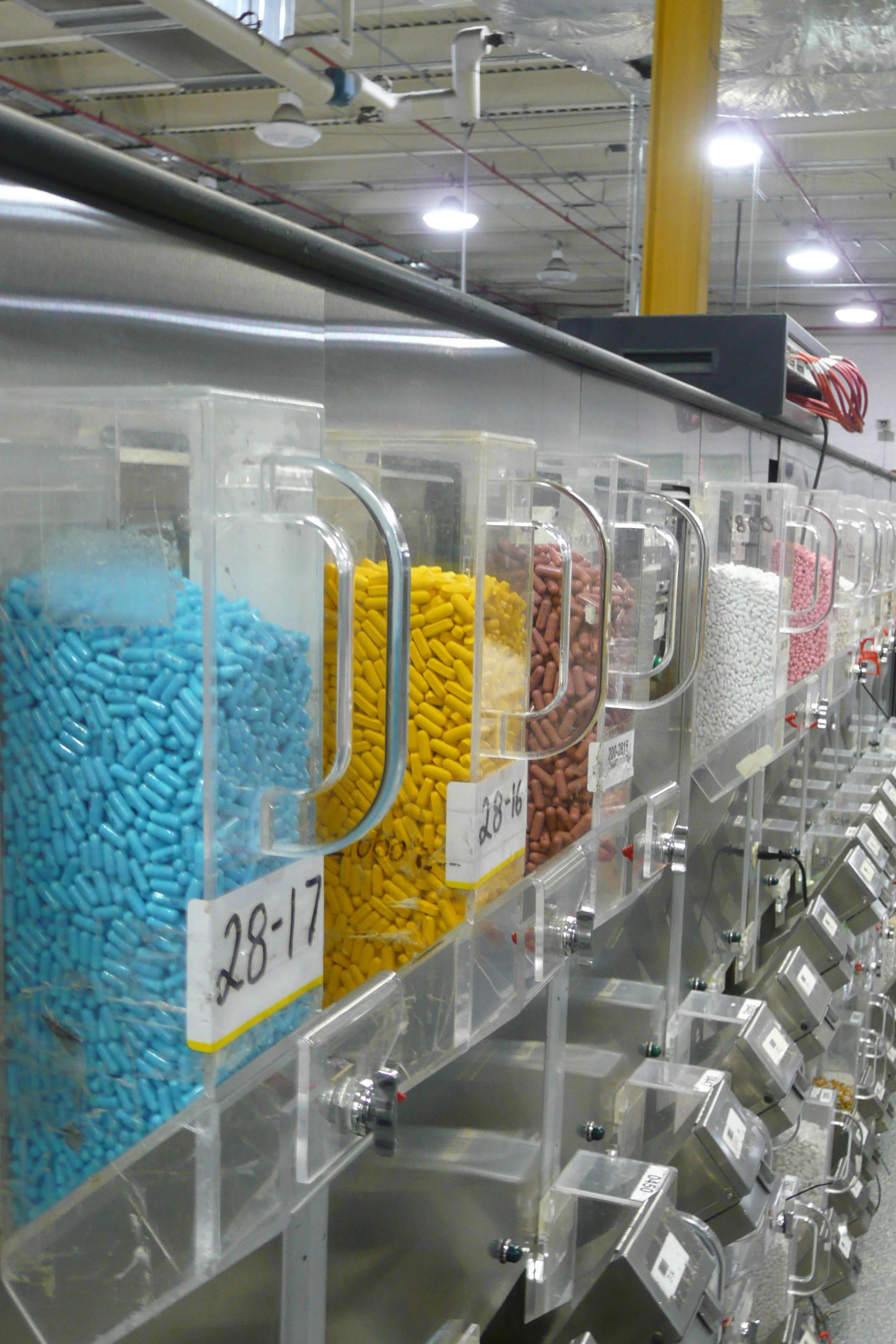
Upper photo of modafinil tablets acquired via the Internet; below photo is a mail order pharmacy dispenser

Quality standards, validation and authentication, sampling and lab testing are commonly substandard or absent for products thought to be cognitive enhancers, including dietary supplements.

=== Well-being and productivity ===
Neuroenhancement products or methods are used with the intent to:

- improve well-being
- possibly encourage societal productivity
- increase incentives to develop potential therapies for various brain diseases, such as Alzheimer's disease.

=== In popular culture ===
Neuroenhancement products are mentioned in entertainment productions, such as Limitless (2011), which may to some degree probe and explore opportunities and threats of using such products.

== Prevalence ==
In general, people under the age of 25 feel that neuroenhancement agents are acceptable or that the decision to use them is to be made individually. Healthcare officials and parents feel concerned due to safety factors, lack of complete information on these agents, and possible irreversible adverse effects; such concerns may reduce the willingness to take such agents.

A 2024 study based on a representative sample of more than 20,000 adults in Germany showed that around 70% of those surveyed had taken substances with the aim of improving mental performance within a year, without a medical prescription. The consumption of caffeinated drinks, such as coffee and energy drinks, was widespread (64% of users), expressly with the aim of improving performance, followed by dietary supplements and home remedies, such as ginkgo biloba (31%). Around 4% stated that they had taken prescription drugs for cognitive enhancement (lifetime prevalence of 6%), corresponding to around 2.5 million users in Germany.

A 2016 German study among 6,454 employees found a rather low life-time prevalence of cognitive enhancement prescription drug use (namely 3%), while the willingness to take such drugs was found in 10% of respondents. A survey of some 5,000 German university students found a relatively low 30-day prevalence of 1%, while 2% of those sampled used such drugs within the last 6 months, 3% within the last 12 months, and 5% of others used the drugs over their lifetimes. Of those students who used such substances during the last 6 months, 39% reported their use once in this period, 24% twice, 12% three times, and 24% more than three times. Consumers of neuroenhancement drugs are more willing to use them again in the future due to positive experiences or a tendency towards addiction.

== See also ==
- Alertness
- Cognitive development
- Cosmetic pharmacology
- Deep brain stimulation
- Intelligence amplification
- Neurohacking
- Neuromarketing
- Neuroregeneration
- Performance enhancement
- Transcranial magnetic stimulation
