= Cogmed =

Cognitive training software program

- Industry: Cognitive training
- Founded: 2001; 25 years ago in Stockholm, Sweden
- Products: Cogmed Working Memory Training
- Parent: Neural Assembly Int AB
- Website: cogmed.com

Cogmed is a cognitive training software program created in the lab of Torkel Klingberg, a neuroscientist at the Karolinska Institute. Torkel Klingberg was using it to present working memory challenges to people while he studied their brains using fMRI, to try to learn about neuroplasticity. When the studies appeared to show that the challenges improved working memory, Klingberg founded Cogmed in 2001, with financial backing from the Karolinska Institute and venture capitalists.

Cogmed's initial marketing was focused on helping people with attention deficit hyperactivity disorder and expanded to other impairments of working memory, such as persons with learning disabilities, and people who had a stroke or other traumatic brain injury.

In 2010, Cogmed was purchased by Pearson Education and became a part of the Pearson Clinical Assessment Group. Karolinska received 22 m SEK and double-digit royalties as part of the transaction. In 2019, Cogmed was transferred back to the original founders.

== Effectiveness ==
A 2012 meta-analysis of 23 research studies on seven different commercial and non-commercial working memory training techniques (including Cogmed) found that "working memory training programs give only near-transfer effects, and there is no convincing evidence that even such near-transfer effects are durable." Another 2012 review of Cogmed found that many of the problem-solving or training tasks presented in Cogmed are not related to working memory, that many of the attention tasks are unrelated to ADHD, and that there is limited transfer to real-life manifestations of attention deficits, concluding "The only unequivocal statement that can be made is that Cogmed will improve performance on tasks that resemble Cogmed training."

In the years following, several independent research groups have published studies supporting the original findings, and showing that Cogmed improves working memory and attention in children with ADHD, children post cancer treatment, and stroke patients.

The largest Cogmed study to date(a randomized, controlled trial by independent researchers, including close to 600 typically developing children) found that Cogmed training led to improvements in "geometry skills, reading skills, Raven's fluid IQ measure, the ability to inhibit prepotent impulses and self-regulation abilities". The study also found that, "3–4 years after the intervention, the children who received training [had] a roughly 16 percentage points higher probability of entering the academic track in secondary school".

The company's marketing efforts have been described in popular media. A 2013 article in The New Yorker magazine said that brain training games are "bogus." A later review in PNAS argued that the question "does cognitive training work" is similar to asking "does medicine cure disease", and suggested that in order to determine the validity of the question, one needs to specify which type of cognitive training, for which group and for which purpose.

A metanalysis published in 2023 by European ADHD Guidelines Group (EAGG) suggests that Cogmed training can lead to improvement in ADHD-related attention symptoms, however the authors state that "clinical effects were limited to small, setting specific, short-term effects".

== See also ==
- Brain training
