= Brain training =

Activities intended to maintain or improve cognitive abilities

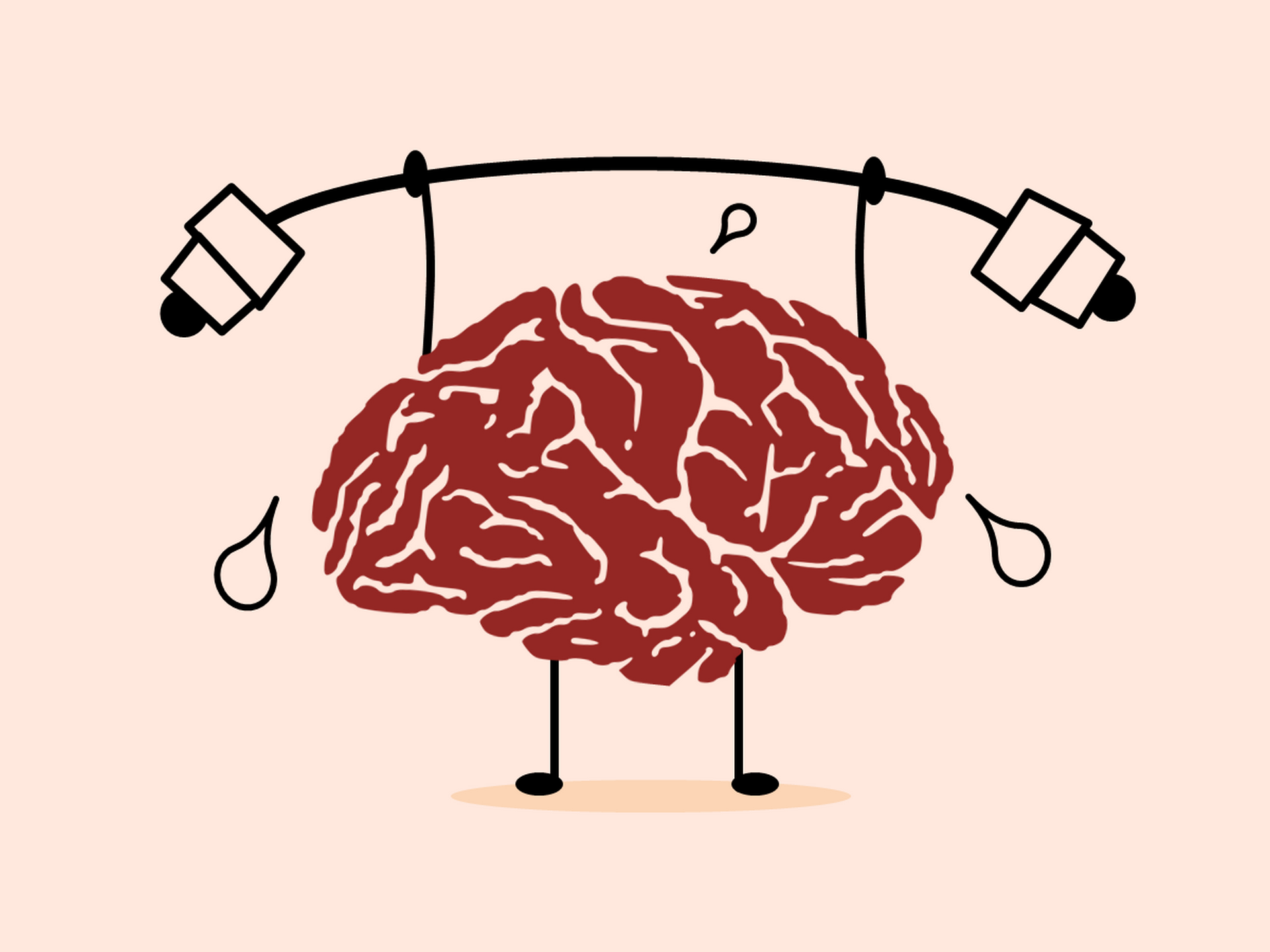
A depiction of a brain doing an overhead press workout

Brain training (also known as a mental exercise or cognitive training) is a program of regular activities purported to maintain or improve one's cognitive abilities. The phrase "cognitive ability" usually refers to components of fluid intelligence such as executive function and working memory. Cognitive training reflects a hypothesis that cognitive abilities can be maintained or improved by exercising the brain, analogous to the way physical fitness is improved by exercising the body. Cognitive training activities can take place in numerous modalities such as cardiovascular fitness training, playing online games or completing cognitive tasks in alignment with a training regimen, playing video games that require visuospatial reasoning, and engaging in novel activities such as dance, art, and music.

Numerous studies have indicated that aspects of brain structure remain "plastic" throughout life. Brain plasticity reflects the ability for the brain to change and grow in response to the environment. There is ample debate within the scientific community on the efficacy of brain training programs and controversy on the ethics of promoting brain training software to potentially vulnerable subjects.

== Studies and interventions ==
Cognitive training has been studied by scientists for the past 100 years.

Cognitive training includes interventions targeted at improving cognitive abilities such as problem-solving, reasoning, attention, executive functions, and working memory. These kinds of abilities are targeted because they are correlated with individual differences such as academic achievement and life outcomes and it is thought that training general cognitive functions will lead to transfer of improvement across a variety of domains. Cognitive reserve is the capacity of a person to meet the various cognitive demands of life and is evident in an ability to assimilate information, comprehend relationships, and develop reasonable conclusions and plans. One hypothesis to support cognitive training is that certain activities, done regularly, might help maintain or improve cognitive reserve.

Cognitive training studies often target clinical groups such as people with neurodegenerative disorders such as Alzheimer's and children with ADHD that experience general cognitive deficits. More broadly, it is thought that cognitive training may especially benefit older adults as there is a general decline in fluid intelligence with age as there are decreases in speed of processing, working memory, longterm memory, and reasoning skills. Some researchers argue that the lower performance of older adults on cognitive tasks may not always reflect actual ability as older adults may show performance decrements due to strategy choice, such as avoiding using memory retrieval in memory tasks.

== Conceptual basis ==
Cognitive training is grounded in the idea that the brain is plastic. Brain plasticity refers to the ability for the brain to change and develop based on life experiences. Evidence for neuroplasticity includes studies on musical expertise and London taxicab drivers that have demonstrated that expertise leads to increased volume in specific brain areas. A 2008 study that trained older adults in juggling showed an increase in gray matter volume as a result of the training. A study attempting to train the updating component of executive function in young and older adults showed that cognitive training could lead to improvements in task performance across both of the groups, however, general transfer of ability to new tasks was only shown in young adults and not older adults. It has been hypothesized that transfer effects are dependent on an overlap in neural activation during the trained and transfer tasks. Cognitive training has been shown to lead to neural changes such as increased blood flow to the prefrontal cortex in attention training and decreased bilateral compensatory recruitment in older adults.

== Mental exercises ==
Mind games for self-improvement fall into two main categories. There are mental exercises and puzzles to maintain or improve the actual working of the brain.

Mental exercises can be done through simple socializing. Social interaction engages in many facets of cognitive thinking and can facilitate cognitive functioning. Cartwright and Zander noted that if an alien was visiting Earth for the first time, they would be surprised by the amount of social contact humans make. Caring for one another and growing up in a group setting (family) shows a certain degree of interdependence that shows deep phylogenetic roots.

There are many things involved in a simple interaction between two people: paying attention, maintaining in memory the conversation, adjusting to a different perspective than your own, assessing situational constraints, and self-monitoring appropriate behavior. It is true that some of these are automatic processes, but attention, working memory, and cognitive control are definitely executive functions. Doing all these things in a simple social interaction helps train the working memory in influencing social inference.

Social cognitive neuroscience also supports social interaction as a mental exercise. The prefrontal cortex function involves the ability to understand a person's beliefs and desires. The ability to control one's own beliefs and desires is served by the parietal and prefrontal regions of the brain, which is the same region emphasizing cognitive control.

The other category of mental exercises falls into the world of puzzles. Neurocognitive disorders such as dementia and impairment in cognitive functioning have risen as a healthcare concern, especially among the older generation. Solving jigsaw puzzles is an effective way to develop visuospatial functioning and keeping the mind sharp. Anyone can do it, as it is low-cost and can be intrinsically motivating. The important part about jigsaw puzzles is that it is challenging, especially compared to other activities, such as watching television. Engagement in such an intellectual activity predicts a lower risk in developing a cognition disorder later on in life.

There is also the category of the self-empowering mind game, as in psychodrama, or mental and fantasy workshops – elements which might be seen as an ultimate outgrowth of yoga as a set of mental (and physical) disciplines.

The ability to imagine and walk oneself through various scenarios is a mental exercise in itself. Self-reflection in this way taps into many different cognitive capabilities, including questioning rigid viewpoints, elaborating on experience, and knowing oneself through their relational context.

== Commercial programs ==
By 2016, companies offering products and services for cognitive training were marketing them as improving educational outcomes for children, and for adults as improving memory, processing speed, and problem-solving, and even as preventing dementia or Alzheimers. They often have supported their marketing with discussion about the educational or professional background of their founders, some discuss neuroscience that supports their approach—especially concepts of neuroplasticity and transfer of learning, and some cite evidence from clinical trials. The key claim made by these companies is that the specific training that they offer generalizes to other fields—academic or professional performance generally or everyday life.

CogniFit was founded in 1999, Cogmed in 2001, Posit Science in 2002, and Brain Age was first released in 2005, all capitalizing on the growing interest within the public in neuroscience, along with heightened worries by parents about ADHD and other learning disabilities in their children, and concern about their own cognitive health as they aged.

The launch of Brain Age in 2005 marked a change in the field, as prior to this products or services were marketed to fairly narrow populations (for example, students with learning problems), but Brain Age was marketed to everyone, with a significant media budget. In 2005, consumers in the US spent $2 million on cognitive training products; in 2007 they spent about $80 million.

By 2012, "brain training" was a $1 billion industry. In 2013 the market was $1.3 billion, and software products made up about 55% of those sales. By that time neuroscientists and others had a growing concern about the general trend toward what they called "neurofication", "neurohype", "neuromania", and neuromyths.

=== Regulation and lawsuits ===
Starting in January 2015, the United States Federal Trade Commission (FTC) sued companies selling "brain training" programs or other products marketed as improving cognitive function, including WordSmart Corporation, the company that makes Lumosity, and Brain Research Labs (which sold dietary supplements) for deceptive advertising; later that year the FTC also sued LearningRx.

The FTC found that Lumosity's marketing "preyed on consumers' fears about age-related cognitive decline, suggesting their games could stave off memory loss, dementia, and even Alzheimer's disease", without providing any scientific evidence to back its claims. The company was ordered not to make any claims that its products can "[improve] performance in school, at work, or in athletics" or "[delay or protect] against age-related decline in memory or other cognitive function, including mild cognitive impairment, dementia, or Alzheimer's disease", or "[reduce] cognitive impairment caused by health conditions, including Turner syndrome, post-traumatic stress disorder (PTSD), attention deficit hyperactivity disorder (ADHD), traumatic brain injury (TBI), stroke, or side effects of chemotherapy", without "competent and reliable scientific evidence", and agreed to pay a $50 million settlement (reduced to $2 million).

In its lawsuit against LearningRx, the FTC said LearningRx had been "deceptively claim[ing] their programs were clinically proven to permanently improve serious health conditions like ADHD (attention deficit hyperactivity disorder), autism, dementia, Alzheimer's disease, strokes, and concussions". In 2016, LearningRx settled with the FTC by agreeing not to make the disputed assertions unless they had "competent and reliable scientific evidence" which was defined as randomized controlled trials done by competent scientists." For the judgment's monetary component, LearningRx agreed to pay $200,000 of a $4 million settlement.

== Effectiveness ==
Studies that try to train specific cognitive abilities often only show task-specific improvements, and participants are unable to generalize their strategies to new tasks or problems. In 2016, there was some evidence that some of these programs improved performance on tasks in which users were trained, less evidence that improvements in performance generalize to related tasks, and almost no evidence that "brain training" generalizes to everyday cognitive performance. In addition, most clinical studies were flawed. But in 2017, the National Academies of Sciences, Engineering, and Medicine found moderate strength evidence for cognitive training as an intervention to prevent cognitive decline and dementia, and in 2018, the American Academy of Neurology guidelines for treatment of mild cognitive impairment included cognitive training.

To address growing public concerns with regard to aggressive online marketing of brain games to older population, a group of scientists published a letter in 2008 warning the general public that there is a lack of research showing effectiveness of brain games in older adults.

In 2010, the Agency for Healthcare Research and Quality found that there was insufficient evidence to recommend any method of preventing age-related memory deficits or Alzheimer's.

In 2014 another group of scientists published a similar warning. Later that year, another group of scientists made a counter statement, organized and maintained by the Chief Scientific Officer of Posit. They compiled a list of published studies on efficacy of cognitive training across populations and disciplines.

In 2014, one group of over 70 scientists stated that brain games cannot be scientifically proven as being cognitively advantageous, whether that be in preventing cognitive decline or improving cognitive functioning. Another group argued the opposite, with over 130 scientists saying that there is valid evidence in the benefits of brain training. The question is how these two groups reached different conclusions in reading the same literature. Different standards on both sides can answer that question. In a more specific manner, there is indeed a great deal of evidence that brain training does indeed improve performance on trained tasks, but less evidence in closely related tasks. There is even less evidence on distantly related tasks.

In 2017, a committee of the National Academies of Sciences, Engineering, and Medicine released a report about the evidence on interventions for preventing cognitive decline and dementia.

In 2017, a group of Australian scientists undertook a systematic review of what studies have been published of commercially available brain training programs in an attempt to give consumers and doctors credible information on which brain training programs are actually scientifically proved to work. After reviewing close to 8,000 studies about brain training programs marketed to healthy older adults, most programs had no peer-reviewed published evidence of their efficacy. Of the seven brain training programs that did, only two of those had multiple studies, including at least one study of high quality: BrainHQ and CogniFit.

In 2019, a group of researchers showed that claims of enhancement following brain training and other training programs have been exaggerated, based on a number of meta-analyses. Other factors, e.g., genetics, seem to play a bigger role.

=== Cognitive training for Parkinson's disease ===
A 2020 Cochrane review found no certain evidence that cognitive training is beneficial for people with Parkinson's disease dementia (PDD) or Parkinson's disease-related mild cognitive impairment (PD-MCI), however the authors also note that their conclusion was based on a small number of studies with few participants, limitations of study design and execution, and imprecise results, and that there is still an overall need for more robust studies involving cognitive training as it pertains to PDD and PD-MCI.

== See also ==
- Brain rot
- Brain training programs
- Cognitive intervention
- Environmental enrichment
- Logic puzzle
- Neurocognition
- Neurobabble
- Neuroplasticity
- Sudoku
