= TV-B-Gone =

Universal remote control device

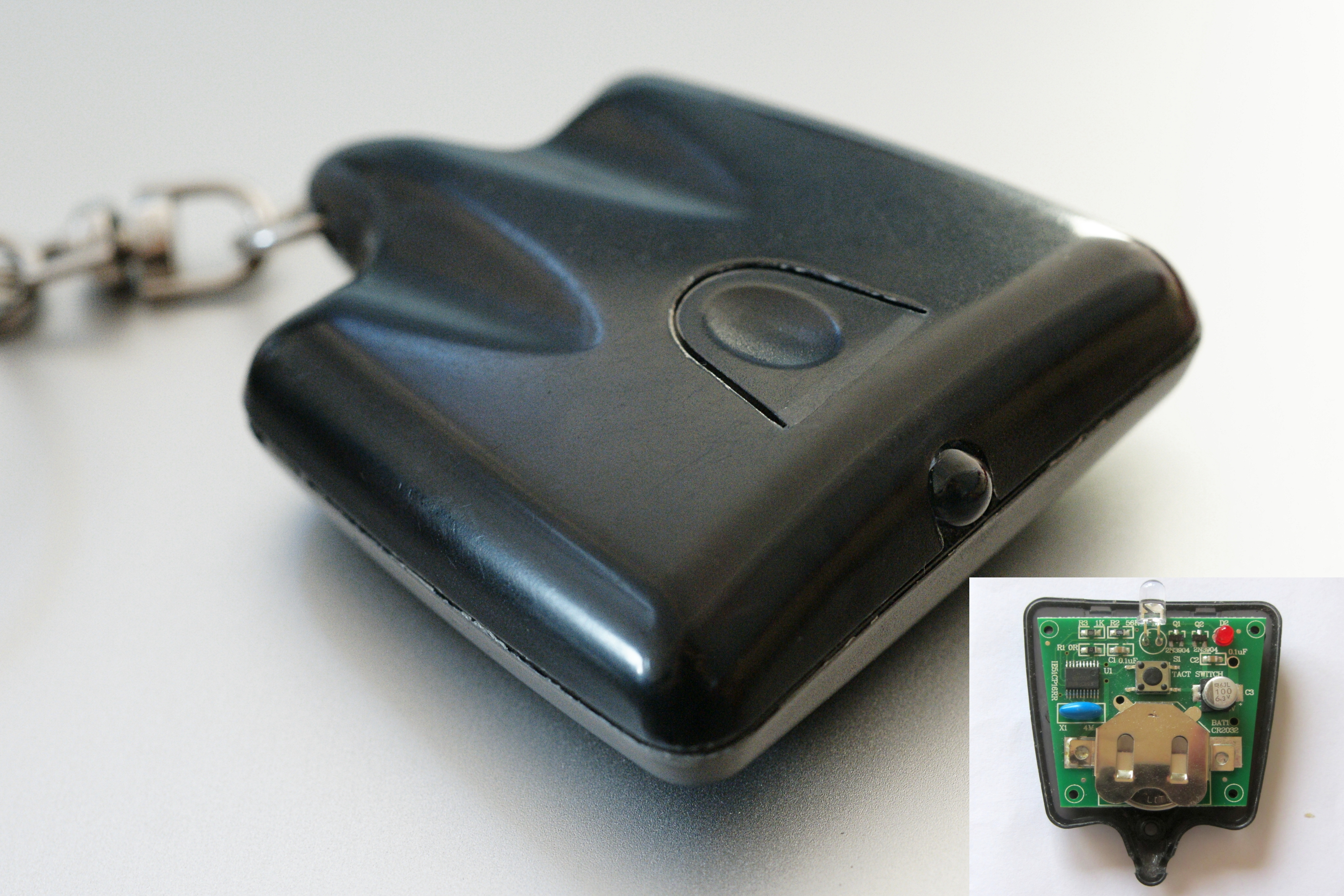
A TV-B-Gone

TV-B-Gone is a universal remote control device for turning off various brands of television sets. Released in 2004, its inventor referred to it as "an environmental management device". Although it can require up to 69 seconds for the device to find the proper code for a particular television receiver, the most popular televisions turn off in the first few seconds.

== History ==
TV-B-Gone was invented by Mitch Altman and is sold by his company Cornfield Electronics. The standard model TV-B-Gone consists of an infra-red LED, two CR2032 cells and an Integrated circuit containing the television power code database, all in a plastic case. The original case aesthetics and design were created by Robert Ellis.

== Models ==
=== TV-B-Gone Pro SHP ===
The TV-B-Gone Pro SHP (Super High Power) is the latest TV-B-Gone to be announced. It is considerably more powerful than the standard model, using eight infra-red LEDs to allow TVs to be turned off from distances of up to 100 meters (300 feet). TV-B-Gone Pro SHP is switchable between its North American and European databases of POWER codes. Later, in 2009, Mitch Altman made a new kind of TV-B-Gone Pro SHP. Instead of disguising it as an iPhone, Mitch Altman has made the new and improved TV-B-Gone look like an iPod Nano and go ten more yards than the old one.

The recent invention of >1W 850 and 970 nm IREDs makes a miniature long range version of the TV-B-Gone feasible.

=== TV-B-Gone Kit ===
At several hacker conventions Mitch Altman has run workshops that allow participants to build their own TV-B-Gones using Adafruit Industries' micro controller–based mini-POV kit. Around January 2008, Adafruit Industries released a kit to build an open source TV-B-Gone.

== Consumer Electronics Show controversy ==
During the 2008 Consumer Electronics Show, Richard Blakeley—associated with Gizmodo—brought a TV-B-Gone remote control and shut off many display monitors at booths and during demos affecting several companies. These actions caused the individual to be banned for life from future CES events.

== See also ==
- TV turnoff
- White Dot
