= Mitch Altman =

American hacker and inventor

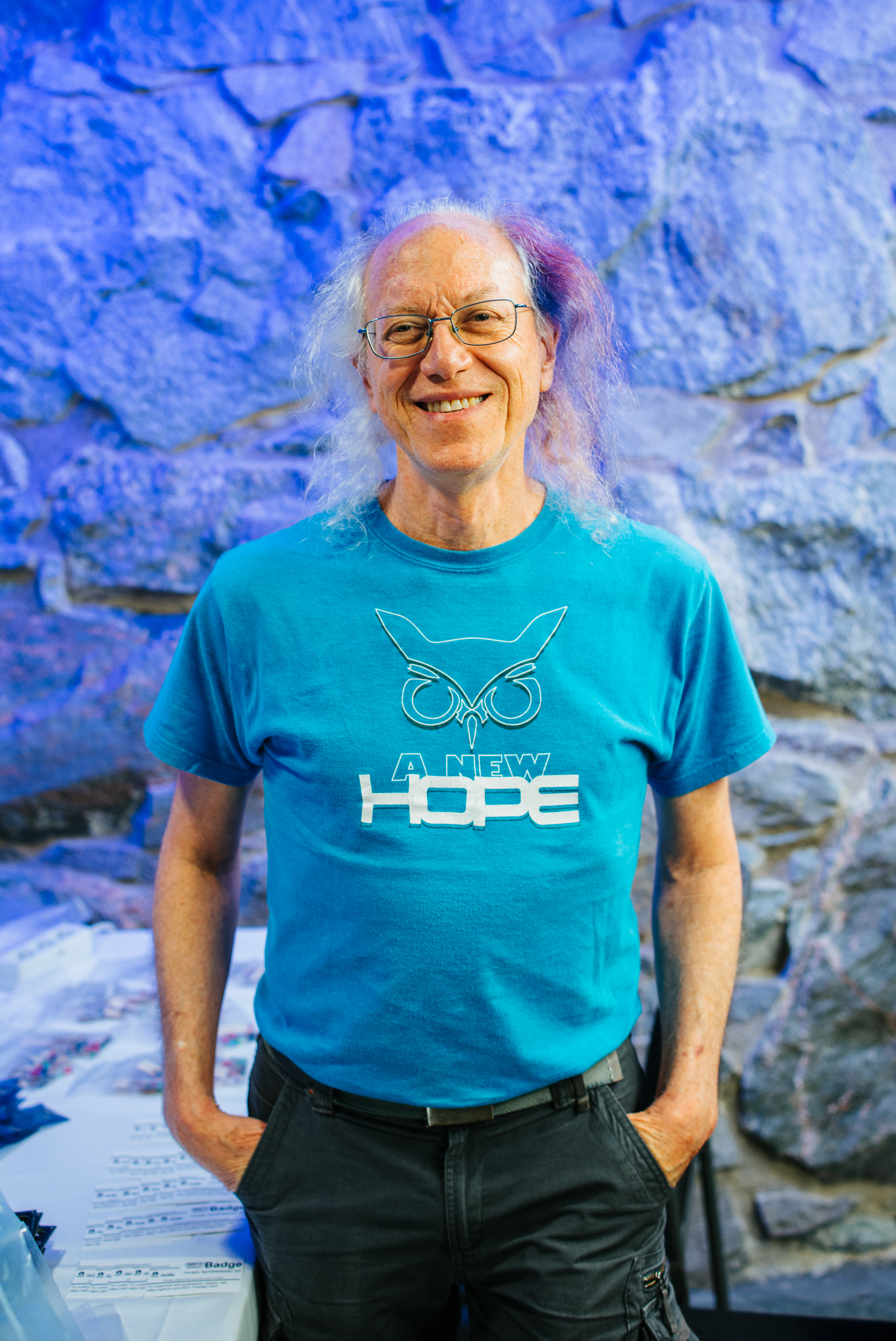
- Mitch Altman in SEC-T conference, 2024
- Born: December 22, 1956 (age 69)
- Education: University of Illinois
- Occupation: Inventor
- Website: TV-B-Gone

Mitch Altman (born December 22, 1956) is a Berlin-based hacker and inventor of TV-B-Gone. He is a featured speaker at hacker conferences, an international expert on the hackerspace movement, and teaches introductory electronics workshops. He is also Chief Scientist and CEO of Cornfield Electronics.

== Early life and education ==
Altman grew up in Rogers Park, Chicago, Illinois. After kindergarten his family moved to Highland Park, Illinois. Altman graduated from Deerfield High School (Illinois) in 1975. Altman is an alumnus of the University of Illinois at Urbana–Champaign, where he earned an undergraduate degree (1980) and a master's degree (1984) in electrical engineering. While at the University of Illinois, Altman co-organized the first Hash Wednesday in Champaign-Urbana in 1977. Altman moved to the San Francisco Bay Area in 1986 to work in Silicon Valley.

== VPL Research, 3ware, Cornfield Electronics, Maker Faire ==
Altman was an early developer of virtual reality technologies, working at VPL Research with Jaron Lanier. In addition to Lanier, Altman worked alongside about 15 other individuals. Altman left VPL Research in protest when it accepted contracts with the United States Department of Defense.

Altman co-founded Silicon Valley start-up 3ware in February 1997 with J. Peter Herz and Jim MacDonald (who is on the advisory board of Cornfield Electronics). Applied Micro Circuits Corporation agreed to acquire 3ware in 2004.

Altman started Cornfield Electronics as a consulting company. After the launch of TV-B-Gone Altman gave the company the tagline "We make Useful Electronics for a Better World".

Following extensive involvement in the "Maker" movement and Make magazine, including being featured in a Make magazine April Fool's Day prank, Altman publicly parted ways with the Maker Faire in 2012 after the Maker Faire accepted contracts with the United States Department of Defense.

== TV-B-Gone ==
In 2004 Altman released a one-button universal remote control called TV-B-Gone, to be used for turning off TVs in public places. Altman used money from the sale of 3ware to pay for the manufacture of the first 20,000 units of TV-B-Gone. By February 2014, he was reported to have sold more than 500,000 units. TV-B-Gone is in its 4th generation, and Altman developed a new product called the TV-B-Gone SHP (Super High Power).

== Other activities ==
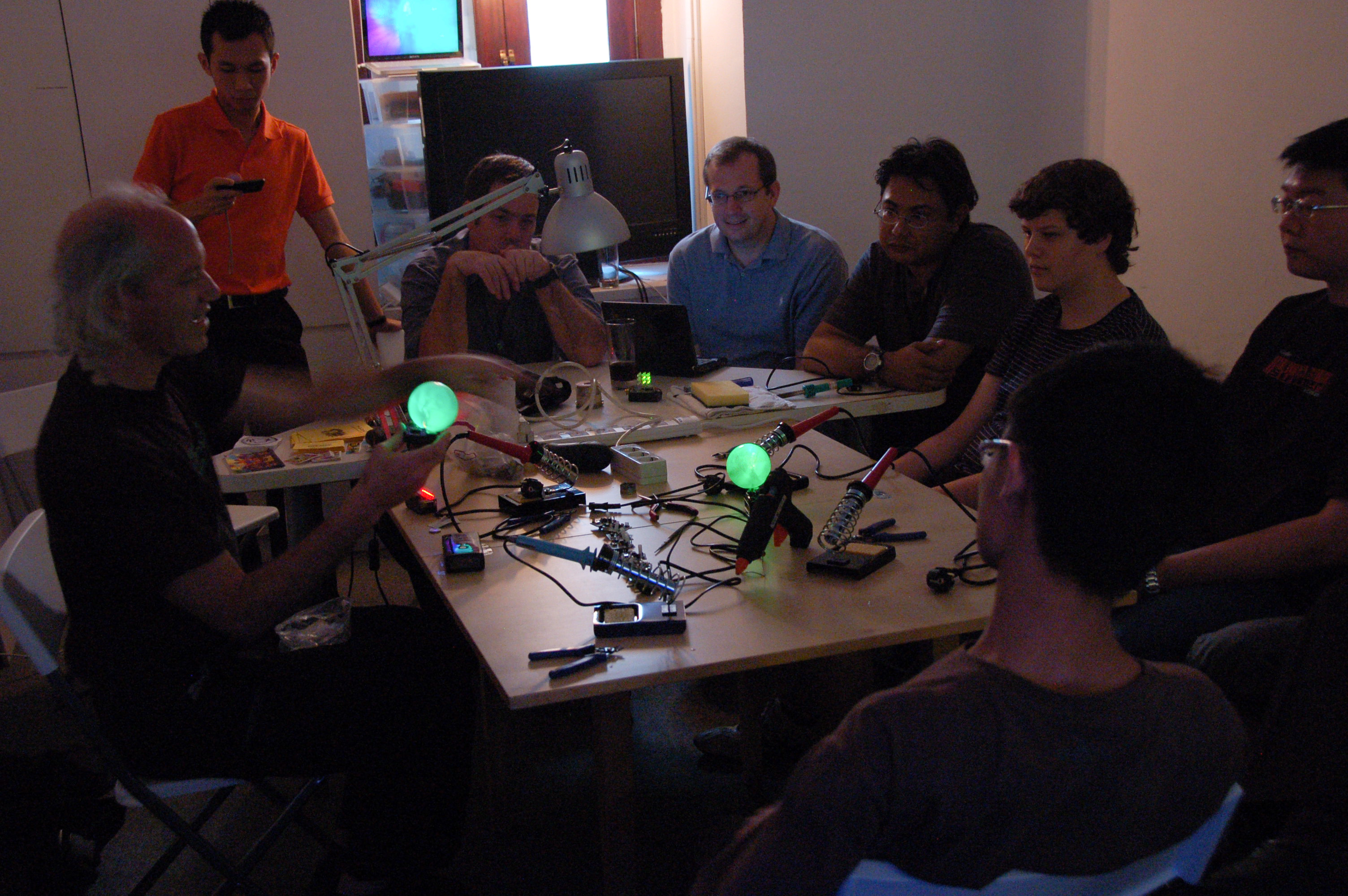
Altman at a workshop at HackerspaceSG in Singapore

Mitch Altman is an important figure in the international "hackerspace" and "maker" movements. While attending the 2007 Berlin Chaos Communication Camp, Altman and Jacob Appelbaum began discussing the idea of a San Francisco hackerspace, at which time there were no hackerspaces in the United States. In October 2008 he co-founded Noisebridge, which was probably the third hackerspace formed in the US. Since then, Altman has traveled extensively, encouraging the formation of hackerspaces, holding panels and workshops on depression, teaching introductory electronics workshops to people of all ages and visiting electronics enthusiast groups around the world. TedX Brussels invited Altman to give a Ted Talk the Hackerspace movement, Make magazine has referred to Altman as "the Johnny Appleseed of hackerspaces", and Altman, who has also written for the magazine, was awarded the first "Maker Hero" award—named in his honor—by Make Magazine on May 20, 2011.

In September 2018, Altman announced that he had left Noisebridge.
