= Television addiction =

Proposed addiction model

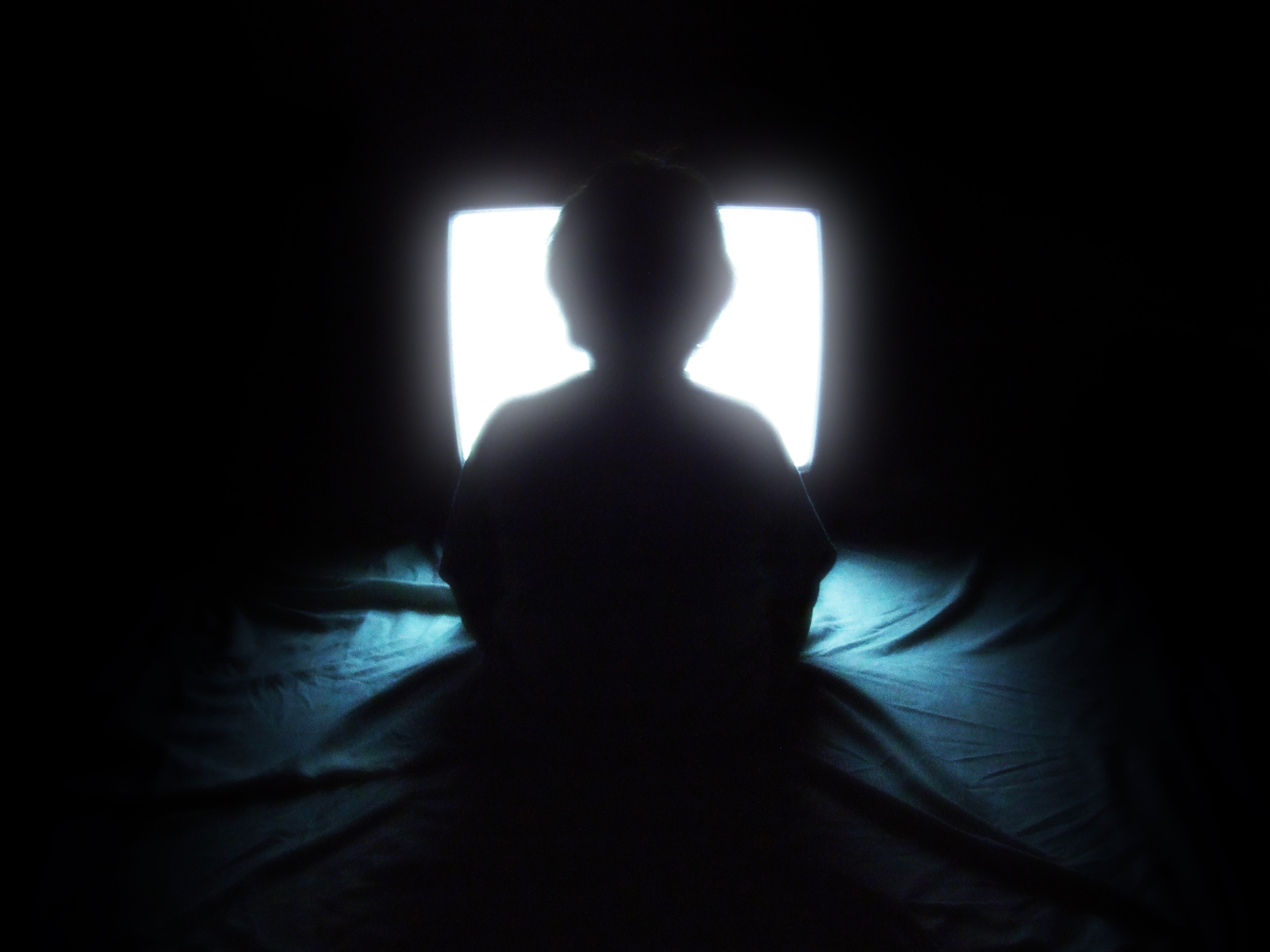
A child watching in front of a TV illustrates the addiction of television on children.

Television addiction is a proposed behavioral addiction which is typically associated with heavy consumption of television programming, which may continue to persist over time.

== Analysis ==
The most recent medical review on this model concluded that pathological television watching behavior may constitute a true behavioral addiction, but indicated that much more research on this topic is needed to demonstrate this. The compulsion can be extremely difficult to control in many cases. The television addiction model has parallels to other forms of behavioral addiction, such as addiction to drugs or gambling, which are also forms of compulsive behavior.

== Recognition ==
Television addiction is not a diagnosable condition of DSM-IV.

== See also ==
- Addiction
- Behavioral modernity
- Evolutionary mismatch
- Social aspects of television
- Television consumption
- TV Turnoff Week
- Video game addiction
