= Digital Maoism =

Essay by Jaron Lanier

"Digital Maoism: The Hazards of the New Online Collectivism" is an essay written by Jaron Lanier, originally published in Edge – the third culture.

== Essay ==
In his online essay, in Edge magazine in May 2006, Lanier criticized the sometimes-claimed omniscience of collective wisdom (including examples such as the Wikipedia article about himself), describing it as "digital Maoism". He writes "If we start to believe that the Internet itself is an entity that has something to say, we're devaluing those people [creating the content] and making ourselves into idiots."

His criticism aims at several targets which concern him and are at different levels of abstraction:

- any attempt to create one final authoritative bottleneck which channels the knowledge onto society is wrong, regardless whether it is a Wikipedia or any algorithmically created system producing meta information,
- sterile style of wiki writing is undesirable because:
  - it removes the touch with the real author of original information, it filters the subtlety of his opinions, essential information (for example, the graphical context of original sources) is lost,
  - it creates the false sense of authority behind the information,
- collective authorship tends to produce or align to mainstream or organizational beliefs,
- he worries that collectively created works may be manipulated behind the scene by anonymous groups of editors who bear no visible responsibility,
  - and that this kind of activity might create future totalitarian systems as these are basically grounded on misbehaved collectives which oppress individuals.

This critique is further explored in an interview with him on Radio National's The Philosopher's Zone, where he is critical of the denatured effect which "removes the scent of people".

In December 2006 Lanier followed up his critique of the collective wisdom with an article in Edge titled "Beware the Online Collective". Lanier writes:

I wonder if some aspect of human nature evolved in the context of competing packs. We might be genetically wired to be vulnerable to the lure of the mob....What's to stop an online mass of anonymous but connected people from suddenly turning into a mean mob, just like masses of people have time and time again in the history of every human culture? It's amazing that details in the design of online software can bring out such varied potentials in human behavior. It's time to think about that power on a moral basis.

Lanier argues that the search for deeper information in any area sooner or later requires that you find information that has been produced by a single person, or a few devoted individuals: "You have to have a chance to sense personality in order for language to have its full meaning." That is, he sees limitations in the utility of an encyclopedia produced by only partially interested third parties as a form of communication.

== Reviews ==
- Chris Suellentrop (June 14, 2006). "The Problem With 'Online Collectivism'". The New York Times.
- Tumlin, Markel; Harris, Steven R.; Buchanan, Heidi; Schmidt, Krista; Johnson, Kay (March 2007). "Collectivism vs. Individualism in a Wiki World: Librarians Respond to Jaron Lanier's Essay "Digital Maoism: The Hazards of the New Online Collectivism"". Serials Review. 33 (1): 45–53. doi:10.1016/j.serrev.2006.11.002.

== Editions ==
- "DIGITAL MAOISM: The Hazards of the New Online Collectivism". Edge Foundation, Inc. May 29, 2006.
