= VPL Research =

Virtual reality company

- Industry: Marketing
- Founded: 1984
- Founder: Jaron Lanier
- Defunct: 1990
- Fate: Bankruptcy

VPL Research was one of the first companies that developed and sold virtual reality products. It was founded by computer scientist Jaron Lanier in 1984. "VPL" stood for "Virtual Programming Languages". In 1990, VPL Research filed for bankruptcy and in 1998 all of its patents were bought by Sun Microsystems.

VPL's funding came in part from Marvin Minsky.

== Products ==
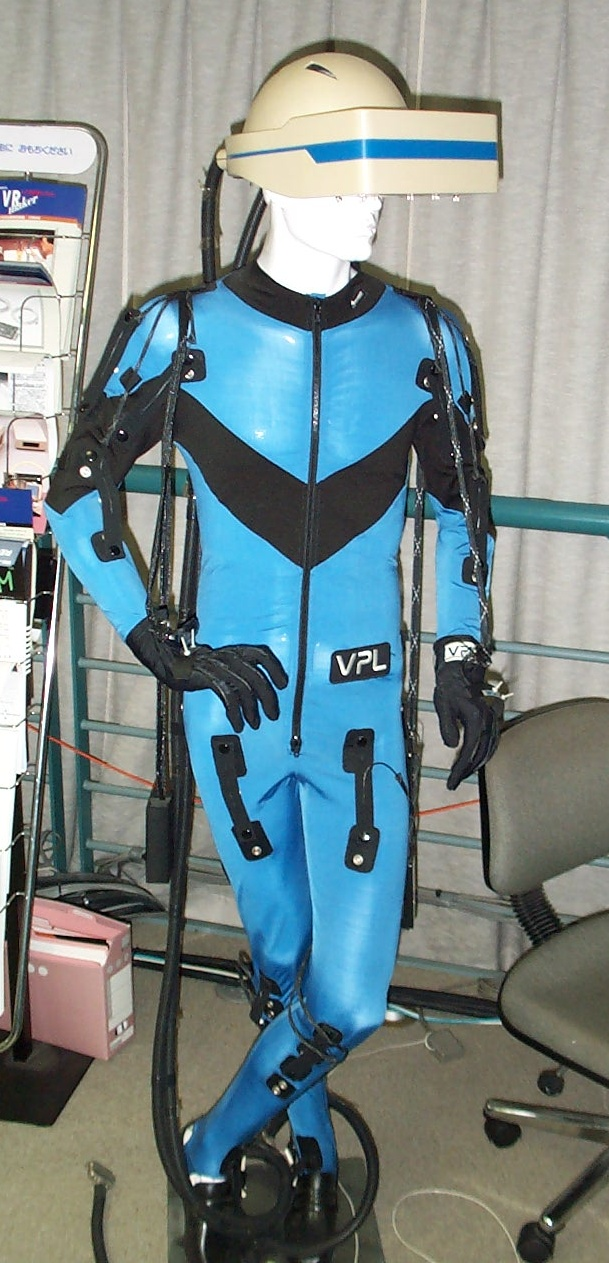
A VPL Research DataSuit, a full-body outfit with sensors for measuring the movement of arms, legs, and trunk. Developed circa 1989. Displayed at the Nissho Iwai showroom in Tokyo

=== The DataGlove ===
This device originally started as an input system for computers. It was later used for virtual reality systems. Thomas Zimmerman invented the prototype of the DataGlove and began looking for other people to help work on it. The device used 6502 microcontrollers. Zimmerman met Mitch Altman and asked him to join VPL part-time because Altman knew how to program the microcontrollers.

The system was wired to a computer. It was interactive and contained fiber-optic bundles to track movements and orientation. That data would then be transmitted to the computer so that the information could be duplicated virtually. It allowed for people to manipulate and re-orient virtual objects. Applications for this wearable device centered on input computer control, gaming, and also the potential for remote surgery.

VPL licensed the DataGlove technology to Mattel, which used it to make the Power Glove.

=== The EyePhone ===
This was a head mounted display (HMD) that was meant to immerse users into a computer simulation. Despite being one of the earliest virtual reality systems in history, it could track head movements - even back then. However, the technical specifications were somewhat limited. For instance, the headset could only generate five or six frames per second, which was less than the 30 frames per second generated by common television sets at the time.

The EyePhone was primarily a research device. Although it was displayed at technology conferences like the Texpo Telecommunications Show, the cost kept the device out of reach from consumers. The entire system, including the computers required to run it, cost upwards of $250,000.

The headset used Fresnel lenses.

=== The DataSuit ===
The DataSuit was a full-body outfit with sensors for measuring the movement of arms, legs, and trunk.

== Team members ==
R&D team

- Jaron Lanier
- Mitch Altman
- Thomas Zimmerman
- Chuck Blanchard
- Steve Bryson
- Young Harvill – In his spare time, Harvill created a program called Swivel 3D which was used for creating computer art. It gave the users the ability to generate virtual worlds on a Macintosh computer. He licensed that software to VPL. Shortly after, Harvill joined VPL as their fourth employee in 1985. During his time there, he worked on a project called "Reality Built for Two (RB2)" which was the first VR system at that time. He also helped with the Data Glove as well.
- Jeff Wright – Worked with Lanier and Blanchard on the Embrace visual programing language from 1988 to 1991. In his Dec. 1989 Computer Graphics World article "Altered States: a software developer's vision of the future of virtual reality" he asked, "What would it mean for people to be able to choose and create their own reality?" speculating that it would "... make people aware of the fact that they already do that, whether or not they realize it, in the natural construction of ordinary reality."
- David Levitt
- Marc deGroot
- Mark Oberman

Management

- Jean-Jacques Grimaud - Co-founder, President, VP of Engineering

Associated people

- Timothy Leary – When Leary got out of jail, he was interested in finding legal ways to explore consciousness which led him to working with individuals at VPL.

== In popular culture ==
- The Data Suit and EyePhone were featured in the 1992 science fiction film The Lawnmower Man.
- Based on VPL's $10,000 Data Glove, Mattel rushed its $90 Power Glove to market, becoming "one of the hottest gift items of the 1989 holiday season" and selling 1.3 million worldwide, but disappointed buyers with its lack of functionality in video games for the Nintendo Entertainment System.
