= Jaron Lanier =

American computer scientist, musician, and author (born 1960)

- Lanier in 2010
- Born: Jaron Zepel Lanier; May 3, 1960 (age 66); New York City, U.S.
- Education: New Mexico State University
- Occupations: Computer scientist, composer, visual artist, author
- Employer(s): Atari; Advanced Network and Services; VPL Research; Silicon Graphics; Columbia University; New York University; Microsoft
- Known for: Co-founder of virtual reality
- Children: 1
- Website: www.jaronlanier.com

Jaron Zepel Lanier (/ˈdʒeɪrɪn lɪˈnɪər/, born May 3, 1960) is an American computer scientist, futurist, and composer. Considered a founder of virtual reality, Lanier and Thomas G. Zimmerman left Atari in 1985 to found VPL Research, Inc., the first company to sell VR goggles and wired gloves. In the late 1990s, Lanier worked on applications for Internet2, and in the 2000s, he was a visiting scholar at Silicon Graphics and various universities. In 2006, he began to work at Microsoft, and since 2009 he has worked at Microsoft Research as an Interdisciplinary Scientist.

Lanier has composed contemporary classical music and is a collector of rare instruments (of which he owns one to two thousand); his 1994 acoustic album Instruments of Change features Asian wind and string instruments such as the khene mouth organ, the suling flute, and the sitar-like esraj. Lanier worked with Mario Grigorov to compose the soundtrack to the documentary film The Third Wave (2007).

In 2005, Foreign Policy named Lanier one of the top 100 Public Intellectuals. In 2010, Lanier was named to the TIME 100 list of most influential people. In 2014, Prospect named Lanier one of the top 50 World Thinkers. In 2018, Lanier was featured as a keynote speaker at the WIRED25 Festival marking the magazine's 25th anniversary, delivering the closing address on digital culture and human agency.

== Early life and education ==
Born Jaron Zepel Lanier in New York City, Lanier was raised in Mesilla, New Mexico. His mother and father were Jewish; his mother was a Nazi concentration camp survivor from Vienna, and his father's family had emigrated from Ukraine to escape the pogroms. When he was nine years old, his mother was killed in a car accident. He lived in tents with his father for a long period before starting a seven-year project to build a geodesic dome home that he helped design.

At age 13, Lanier convinced New Mexico State University (NMSU) to let him enroll. At NMSU, he took graduate-level courses; he received a grant from the National Science Foundation to study mathematical notation, which led him to learn computer programming.

From 1979 to 1980, Lanier's NSF-funded project at NMSU focused on "digital graphical simulations for learning". Lanier also attended art school in New York during this time, but returned to New Mexico and worked as an assistant to a midwife. The father of a baby he helped deliver gave him a car as a gift, which Lanier later drove to Santa Cruz.

== Atari Labs, VPL Research (1983–1990) ==
Lanier made a game, Moon Dust, for the Commodore 64, which led to a job at Atari. While working for Atari in California, he met Thomas Zimmerman, inventor of the data glove. After Atari was split into two companies in 1984, Lanier became unemployed. The free time enabled him to concentrate on his own projects, including VPL, a "post-symbolic" visual programming language. Zimmerman and Lanier founded VPL Research, focusing on commercializing virtual reality technologies; the company prospered for a while, but filed for bankruptcy in 1990. In 1999, Sun Microsystems bought VPL's virtual reality and graphics-related patents.

Lanier's ideas about programming languages, music, and the power of information are described in the book Programmers at Work, a collection of interviews published by Microsoft Press in 1986.

== Internet2, visiting scholar (1997–2001) ==
From 1997 to 2001, Lanier was the Chief Scientist of Advanced Network and Services, which contained the Engineering Office of Internet2, and he served as the Lead Scientist of the "National Tele-immersion Initiative", a coalition of research universities studying advanced applications for Internet2. The Initiative demonstrated the first prototypes of tele-immersion in 2000 after a three-year development period. From 2001 to 2004, Lanier was visiting scientist at Silicon Graphics Inc., where he developed solutions to core problems in telepresence and tele-immersion. He was also visiting scholar with the Department of Computer Science at Columbia University from 1997 to 2001, a visiting artist with New York University's Interactive Telecommunications Program, and a founding member of the International Institute for Evolution and the Brain.

== Personal life ==
Jaron Lanier and his wife, Lena, have one child.

== Selected works ==
=== One-Half a Manifesto (2000) ===
In One-Half a Manifesto, Lanier criticizes the claims of writers such as Ray Kurzweil and opposes the prospect of so-called "cybernetic totalism", which he defines as "a cataclysm brought on when computers become ultra-intelligent masters of matter and life." Lanier's position is that humans may not be considered biological computers, i.e., they may not be compared to digital computers in any proper sense, and it is very unlikely that they could be generally replaced by computers easily in a few decades, even economically. While transistor count increases according to Moore's law, overall performance rises only very slowly. According to Lanier, this is because human productivity in developing software increases only slightly, and software becomes more bloated and remains as error-prone as ever. "Simply put, software just won't allow it. Code can't keep up with processing power now, and it never will."

=== "Post-symbolic communication" (2006) ===
Lanier has speculated about what he calls "post-symbolic communication". In his April 2006 Discover magazine column, he wrote about cephalopods (i.e., the various species of octopus, squid, and related molluscs), many of which are able to morph their bodies, including changing the pigmentation and texture of their skin, as well as forming complex shape imitations with their limbs. Lanier sees this behavior, especially as exchanged between two octopuses, as a direct behavioral expression of thought.

=== Wikipedia and the omniscience of collective wisdom (2006) ===
In his online essay "Digital Maoism: The Hazards of the New Online Collectivism", published in Edge magazine in May 2006, Lanier criticized the sometimes-claimed omniscience of collective wisdom (including examples such as the Wikipedia article about him, which he said exaggerates his film-directing work), calling it "digital Maoism". He wrote: "If we start to believe that the Internet itself is an entity that has something to say, we're devaluing those people [creating the content] and making ourselves into idiots."

His criticism aims at several targets at different levels of abstraction:

- any attempt to create one final authoritative bottleneck that channels the knowledge onto society is wrong, regardless of whether it is Wikipedia or any algorithmically created system producing meta information,
- it creates a false sense of authority behind the information,
- a sterile style of wiki writing is undesirable because
  - it removes the touch of a real author of original information, it filters the subtlety of the author's opinions, essential information (such as the graphical context of original sources) is lost,
- collective authorship tends to produce or align to mainstream or organizational beliefs,
- anonymous groups of editors who bear no visible responsibility may manipulate collectively created works behind the scenes, and
  - this kind of activity might lead to totalitarian systems as it is basically grounded on misbehaved collectives that oppress individuals.

This critique was explored in an interview on Radio National's The Philosopher's Zone, in which Lanier criticizes the denatured effect that "removes the scent of people".

In December 2006, Lanier followed up his critique of the collective wisdom with an article in Edge titled "Beware the Online Collective". He wrote:

I wonder if some aspect of human nature evolved in the context of competing packs. We might be genetically wired to be vulnerable to the lure of the mob... What's to stop an online mass of anonymous but connected people from suddenly turning into a mean mob, just like masses of people have time and time again in the history of every human culture? It's amazing that details in the design of online software can bring out such varied potentials in human behavior. It's time to think about that power on a moral basis.

Lanier argues that the search for deeper information in any area eventually requires finding information produced by a single person or a few devoted people: "You have to have a chance to sense personality in order for language to have its full meaning." That is, he sees limitations in the utility of an encyclopedia produced by only partially interested third parties as a form of communication.

=== You Are Not a Gadget (2010) ===
In his book You Are Not a Gadget, Lanier criticizes what he perceives as the hive mind of Web 2.0 (wisdom of the crowd) and calls the open source and open content expropriation of intellectual production a form of "Digital Maoism". He accuses Web 2.0 developments of devaluing progress and innovation and glorifying the collective at the expense of the individual. He criticizes Wikipedia and Linux as examples of this—Wikipedia for what he sees as its "mob rule" by anonymous editors, the weakness of its non-scientific content, and its bullying of experts.

Lanier also argues that certain aspects of the open source and content movement lack the ability to create anything truly new and innovative. For example, he argues that the open source movement did not create the iPhone, and accuses Web 2.0 of making search engines lazy, destroying the potential of innovative websites such as Thinkquest, and hampering the communication of ideas such as mathematics to a wider audience.

Lanier further argues that the open-source approach has destroyed opportunities for the middle class to finance content creation and results in the concentration of wealth in a few individuals—"the lords of the clouds"—people who, more by virtue of luck rather than innovation, manage to insert themselves as content concentrators at strategic times and locations in the cloud. Lanier also criticizes the MIDI Standard for musical instrument commonality.

=== Who Owns the Future? (2013) ===
External videos
- Presentation by Lanier on Who Owns the Future, May 15, 2013, C-SPAN

In his book Who Owns the Future?, Lanier posits that the middle class is increasingly disenfranchised in online economies. By convincing users to give away valuable information about themselves in exchange for free services, firms can accrue large amounts of data at virtually no cost. Lanier calls these firms "Siren Servers", alluding to the sirens in the Odyssey. Instead of paying each person for their contribution to the data pool, the Siren Servers concentrate wealth in the hands of the few who control the data centers.

For example, he points to Google's translation algorithm, which amalgamates translations people have uploaded, giving the user its best guess. The people behind the translations are not paid, and Google profits from increased ad visibility as a powerful Siren Server. In another example, Lanier points out that in 1988, when it led the digital imaging industry, Kodak employed 140,000 people. By 2012, Kodak had filed for bankruptcy due to free photo-sharing sites such as Instagram that employed only 13 people at the time.

As a solution to these problems, Lanier puts forth an alternative structure for the Web based on Ted Nelson's Project Xanadu. Lanier proposes a two-way linking system that would point to the source of any piece of information, creating an economy of micropayments that compensates people for their work.

=== Dawn of the New Everything (2017) ===
External videos
- Presentation by Lanier on Dawn of the New Everything, December 7, 2017, C-SPAN

In his book Dawn of the New Everything: Encounters with Reality and Virtual Reality, Lanier reflects on his upbringing in 1960s New Mexico, his lifelong relationship with technology, and his path to Silicon Valley. Part personal memoir and part rumination on virtual reality, Lanier highlights VR's versatility in historical context and projects its functions into the future.

Lanier writes of VR's capacity to engage and inspire more than any other kind of technology ("TV and video games draw people into a zombielike trance ... while VR is active and makes you tired after a while"). He writes that the older, poorer VR equipment might have done an even better job at exposing one's own process of perception, since "the best enjoyment of VR includes not really being convinced. Like when you go to a magic show." And he underscores how VR helps the user focus on reality rather than the virtual world, explaining that the best VR magic happens in the moments right after the demo ends (his lab often gave visitors coming out of the headset flowers, as the visitors would experience them as though for the first time).

Lanier cites modern VR's rich résumé beyond gaming and entertainment: it has been used to treat war veterans overcoming PTSD; by doctors to perform intricate surgeries; by paraplegics wanting to feel the sense of flight; and as a mechanism to prototype almost every vehicle fabricated in the last two decades. Throughout the book Lanier intersperses 51 definitions of VR, illuminating its many uses, gifts, and pitfalls.

=== Ten Arguments for Deleting Your Social Media Accounts Right Now (2018) ===
External videos
- Presentation by Lanier on Ten Arguments for Deleting Your Social Media Accounts Right Now, June 19, 2018, C-SPAN

Lanier is concerned about the influence of social media, arguing that platforms such as Twitter and Facebook have made their users cruder, less empathetic, and more tribal. He worries that reliance on social media platforms is reducing people's capacity for spirituality, and that social media users are in essence turning into automated extensions of the platforms.

=== There Is No A.I. (2023) ===
In April 2023, Lanier published in The New Yorker an alternative view of artificial intelligence (A.I.) as less intelligent than its name, and popular culture, suggest. Lanier concludes his essay as follows: "Think of people. People are the answer to the problems of bits."

== Assessment of the Internet ==
Lanier asserted in 1998 that the Internet mirrors the contemporary culture accurately,

The Internet has created the most precise mirror of people as a whole that we've yet had. It is not a summary prepared by a social scientist or an elite think tank. It is not the hagiography of an era, condensed by a romantic idealist or a sneering cynic. It is the real us, available for direct inspection for the first time. Our collective window shades are now open. We see the mundanity, the avarice, the ugliness, the perversity, the loneliness, the love, the inspiration, the serendipity, and the tenderness that manifest in humanity. Seen in proportion, we can breathe a sigh of relief. We are basically OK.

== Views about Wikipedia ==
While talking to Simon Hattenstone, Lanier said:

Wikipedia is run by super-nice people who are my friends. But the thing is it's like one encyclopedia. Some of us might remember when on paper there was both an Encyclopedia Britannica and Encyclopedia Americana and they provided different perspectives. The notion of having the perfect encyclopedia is just weird.

== Music ==
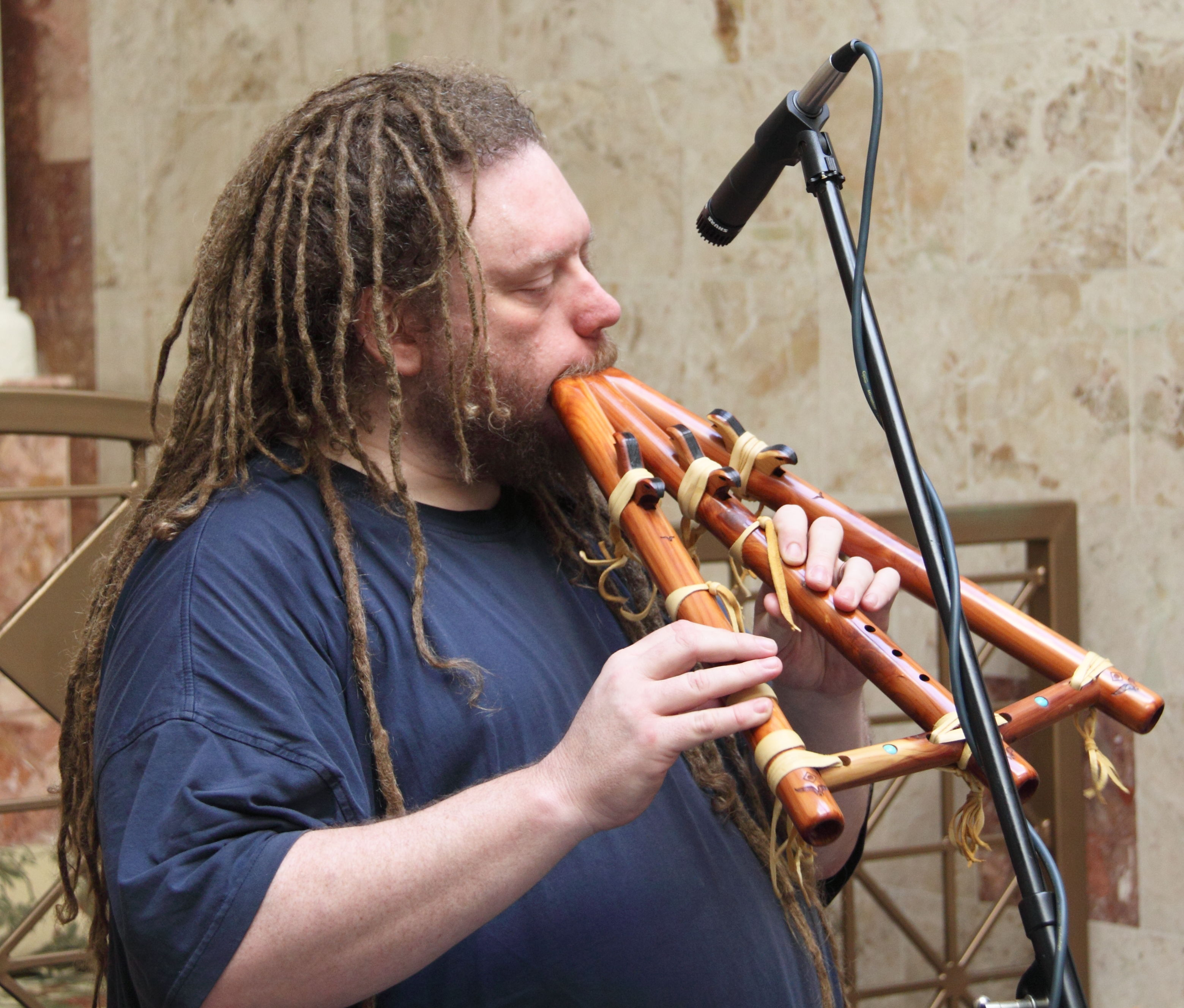
Lanier performing at the Garden of Memory Solstice Concert in June 2009

Lanier has been active since the late 1970s in the world of contemporary classical music, sometimes known as "new classical". He is a pianist and a specialist in many non-Western musical instruments, especially the wind and string instruments of Asia. He maintains one of the world's largest and most varied collections of actively played rare instruments. Lanier owns a BACH.Bow, a convex curved bow which, unlike an ordinary bow, renders possible polyphonic playing on a string instrument. Lanier has performed with artists as diverse as Philip Glass, Ornette Coleman, George Clinton, Vernon Reid, Terry Riley, Duncan Sheik, Pauline Oliveros, and Stanley Jordan. Recording projects include his acoustic techno duet with Sean Lennon and an album of duets with flutist Robert Dick.

Lanier also writes chamber and orchestral music. His commissions include an opera that will premiere in Busan, South Korea; a symphony, Symphony for Amelia, premiered by the Bach Festival Society Orchestra and Choir in Winter Park, Florida, in 2010; Earthquake! , a ballet that premiered at the Yerba Buena Center for the Arts in San Francisco in 2006; Little Shimmers for the TroMetrik ensemble, which premiered at ODC in San Francisco in 2006; Daredevil for the ArrayMusic chamber ensemble, which premiered in Toronto in 2006; a concert-length sequence of works for orchestra and virtual worlds (including Canons for Wroclaw, Khaenoncerto, The Egg , and others) celebrating the 1,000th birthday of the city of Wrocław, Poland, premiered in 2000; a triple concerto, The Navigator Tree, for the National Endowment for the Arts and the American Composers Forum, premiered in 2000; and Mirror/Storm, a symphony commissioned by the St. Paul Chamber Orchestra, premiered in 1998. Continental Harmony, a PBS special that documented the development and premiere of The Navigator Tree, won a CINE Golden Eagle Award.

In 1994, Lanier released the contemporary classical music album Instruments of Change on POINT Music/Philips/PolyGram Records. On "The Crane Flies West 2" (episode 357) of Hearts of Space, Stephen Hill called it a Western exploration of Asian musical traditions. Lanier is working on a book, Technology and the Future of the Human Soul, and a music album, Proof of Consciousness, in collaboration with Mark Deutsch.

Lanier's work with Asian instruments can be heard extensively on the soundtrack of Three Seasons (1999), the first film to win both the Audience and Grand Jury awards at the Sundance Film Festival. He and Mario Grigorov scored The Third Wave, a film that premiered at Sundance in 2007. He is working with Terry Riley on a collaborative opera, Bastard, the First.

Lanier has also pioneered the use of Virtual Reality in musical stage performance with his band Chromatophoria, which has toured worldwide, playing venues such as the Montreux Jazz Festival. He plays virtual instruments and uses real instruments to guide events in virtual worlds. In 2010, Lanier collaborated with Rollins College and John V. Sinclair's Bach Festival Choir and Orchestra on the premiere of his Symphony for Amelia.

Lanier contributed the afterword to Sound Unbound: Sampling Digital Music and Culture (MIT Press, 2008) edited by Paul D. Miller, a.k.a. DJ Spooky.

On May 9, 1999, Lanier published "Piracy is Your Friend", a New York Times opinion piece in which he argued that record labels were a much bigger threat to artists than piracy. The original article is no longer available, but an excerpt, "Making an Ally of Piracy", exists. The original article is quoted in a separate New York Times article by Neil Strauss. On November 20, 2007, Lanier published a mea culpa sequel in The New York Times titled "Pay Me for My Content".

On August 31, 2023, Lainer made a guest appearance as a pianist at the Great American Music Hall in San Francisco, improvising at John Zorn's 70th birthday celebration with Zorn, Bill Frisell, Laurie Anderson, and Dave Lombardo.

== Memberships ==
Lanier has served on numerous advisory boards, including the Board of Councilors of the University of Southern California, Medical Media Systems (a medical visualization spin-off company associated with Dartmouth College), the Microdisplay Corporation, and NY3D (developers of auto stereo displays).

In 1997, he was a founding member of the "National Tele-Immersion Initiative", an effort to use computer technology to give people separated by great distances the illusion that they are physically together. Lanier is a member of the Global Business Network, part of the Monitor Group.

== In the media ==
Lanier has appeared in several documentaries, including the 1990 documentary Cyberpunk, the 1992 Danish television documentary Computerbilleder – udfordring til virkeligheden (Computer Pictures—a Challenge to Reality), the 1995 documentary Synthetic Pleasures, the 2004 television documentary Rage Against the Machines, and the 2020 Netflix documentary The Social Dilemma. Lanier was credited as a crew member for the 2002 film Minority Report. He said his role was to help make up the gadgets and scenarios. Lanier has appeared on The Colbert Report, Charlie Rose, and The Tavis Smiley Show. He appeared on ABC's The View on June 19, 2018, promoting his book Ten Arguments For Deleting Your Social Media Accounts Right Now. He was a guest on the Radiolab podcast episode "The Cataclysm Sentence", released on April 18, 2020. Lanier was interviewed by Andrew Yang in the "Yang Speaks" podcast episode "Who owns your data? Jaron Lanier has the answer" on May 28, 2020. Lanier appeared on the Lex Fridman podcast on September 6, 2021, to talk about his views on AI, social media, VR, and the future of humanity. He has had speaking engagements and presentations at Concordia University Wisconsin and University Temple United Methodist Church.

== Awards ==
- Jill Watson Festival Across the Arts Wats:on? Award in 2001
- Finalist for the first Edge of Computation Award in 2005
- Honorary doctorate from New Jersey Institute of Technology in 2006
- IEEE Virtual Reality Career Award in 2009
- Named one of Time magazine's Time 100, one of the most influential thinkers in 2010
- Honorary doctorate from Franklin and Marshall College in 2012
- Awarded the Goldsmith Book Prize for best trade book in 2014
- Peace Prize of the German Book Trade in 2014

== Works ==
=== Western classical music ===
- Instruments of Change (1994), POINT Music/Philips/PolyGram Records

=== Video games ===
- Alien Garden (Atari 800, 1982, with designer Bernie DeKoven)
- Moondust (C64, 1983)

=== Books ===
- Information Is an Alienated Experience, Basic Books, 2006, ISBN 0-465-03282-6
- You Are Not a Gadget: A Manifesto, New York: Alfred A. Knopf, 2010, ISBN 978-1-84614-341-0
- Who Owns the Future?, San Jose: Simon & Schuster, UK: Allen Lane, 2013, ISBN 978-1-846145223
- Dawn of the New Everything: Encounters with Reality and Virtual Reality, New York: Henry Holt and Co., 2017, ISBN 9781627794091
- Ten Arguments for Deleting Your Social Media Accounts Right Now, New York: Henry Holt and Co., 2018, ISBN 978-1-250-19668-2
