= Comfort television =

Rewatching television programs for comfort and stress relief

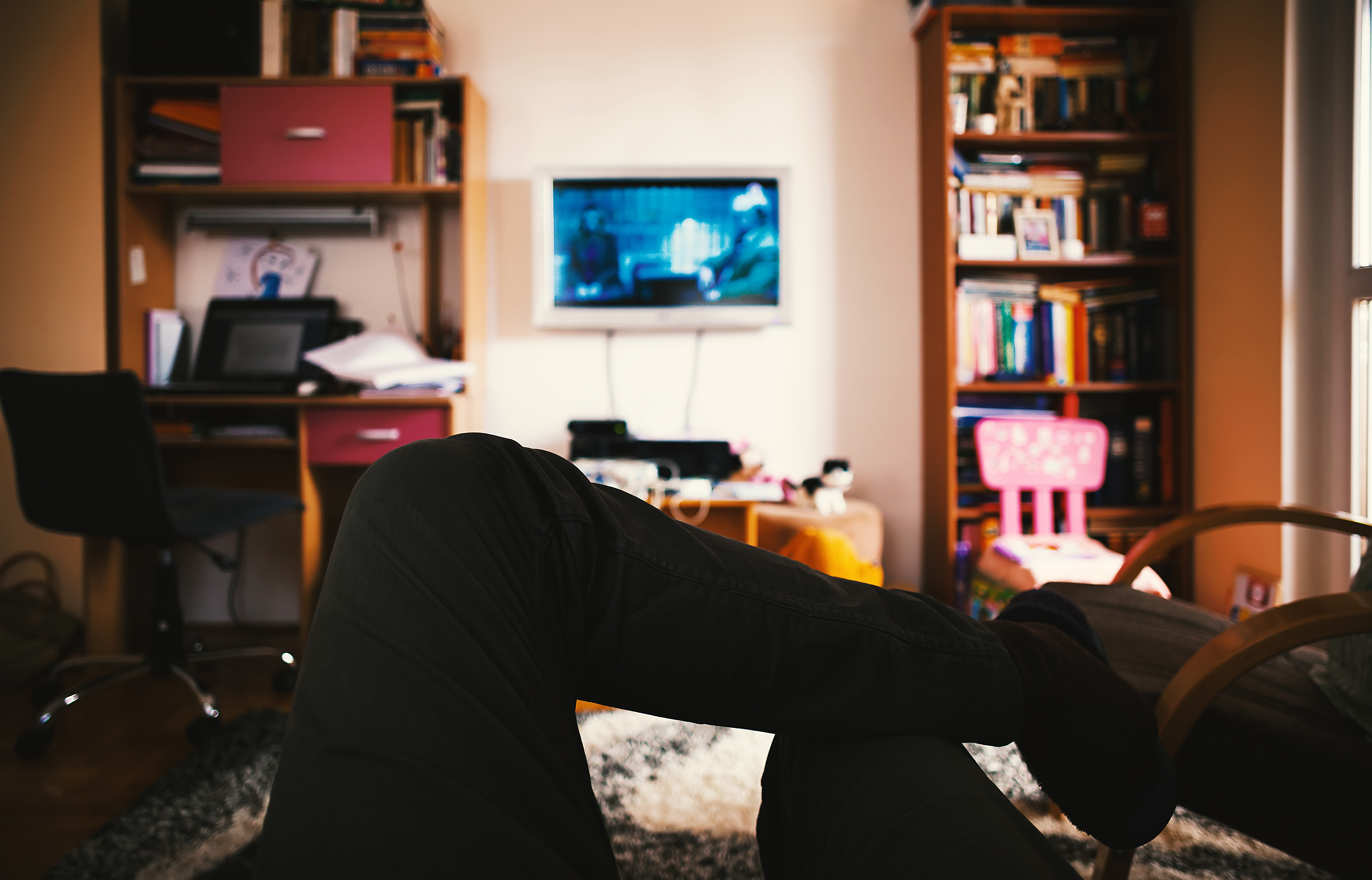
A person watching television in a relaxed home setting.

Comfort television, also referred to as comfort TV or comfort shows, is the act of rewatching the same television program, often repeatedly, for feelings of comfort and stress relief. Rather than being considered a formal television genre, it is typically understood as a viewing practice shaped by individual viewer preferences and emotional responses to media.

The concept of comfort television has been discussed in numerous news articles in the streaming television era, when media content can be viewed repeatedly due to the availability of on-demand platforms. Additionally, scholars have examined comfort television as a way individuals manage emotional needs and maintain a sense of stability in their daily lives.

== Patterns ==
Comfort television is a concept that describes a viewer's relationship to a specific television program rather than a category defined by genre or format. Programs such as sitcoms, dramas, reality shows, or animated series may all function as comfort television, provided they are repeatedly viewed for familiarity, emotional ease, or attachment to characters. Individuals identify their own comfort shows based on personal experience and emotional connection.

Comfort television has become especially popular during periods of uncertainty for viewers, such as during the COVID-19 pandemic when viewers turned to comfort television to help manage their stress and anxiety levels.

Comfort television has also been linked to the concept of parasocial interaction, in which viewers form one-sided relationships with media figures and characters. These perceived relationships can foster feelings of companionship and emotional connection despite the absence of real-world interaction. Additionally, comfort viewing is often associated with nostalgia, as repeated exposure to familiar programs may evoke memories and emotional attachment over time.

== See also ==
- Binge-watching
- Media psychology
- Television studies
- Television consumption
- Comfort food
