= Who Owns the Future? =

Book by Jaron Lanier

- First edition (US)
- Author: Jaron Lanier
- Language: English
- Genre: Non-fiction
- Published: Simon & Schuster (US); Allen Lane (UK)
- Media type: Book
- Pages: 396
- Awards: 2014 Goldsmith Book Prize
- ISBN: 9781451654967

Who Owns the Future? a non-fiction book written by Jaron Lanier published by Simon & Schuster in 2013. The book was well received and won multiple awards in 2014: Peace Prize of the German Book Trade, the Goldsmith Book Prize, and Top honors at the San Francisco Book Festival.

== Content ==
Lanier posits that the middle class is increasingly disenfranchised from online economies. By convincing users to give away valuable information (personal data) about themselves in exchange for free services, firms can accrue large amounts of data at virtually no cost. Lanier calls these firms "Siren Servers," alluding to the Sirens of Ulysses. Instead of paying each individual for their contribution to the data pool, the Siren Servers concentrate wealth in the hands of the few who control the data centers. For example, he points to Google's translation algorithm, which amalgamates previous translations uploaded by people online, giving the user its best guess. The people behind the source translations receive no payment for their work, while Google profits from increased ad visibility as a powerful Siren Server. As a solution to this problem, Lanier puts forth an alternative structure to the web based on Ted Nelson's Project Xanadu. He proposes a two-way linking system that would point to the source of any piece of information, creating an economy of micropayments that compensates people for original material they post to the web.

== Structure ==
The book is divided into nine parts plus a conclusion. Lanier ends each part of the book with interludes. Each interlude is tailored to the theme of the chapters contained in each part of the book. The interludes read like mini fictional short stories, and others suggest guiding thoughts on what reader could take away from the theme in each cluster of chapters.

=== Parts ===
1. First Round
2. The Cybernetic Tempest
3. How This Century Might Unfold, from Two Points of View
4. Markets, Markets, Energy Landscapes, and Narcissism
5. Contest to Be Most Meta
6. Democracy
7. Ted Nelson
8. The Dirty Pictures (or, Nuts and Bolts: What a Humanistic Alternative Might Be Like)
9. Transition
10. Conclusion

== Reception ==
Joe Nocera from the New York Times said:

The most important book I read in 2013 was Jaron Lanier's "Who Owns the Future?".

Janet Maslin from the New York Times compared Lanier to Michael Jackson, the "King of Pop", while dubbing Lanier "the father of virtual reality".

Hiawatha Bray from the Boston Globe said:

In Lanier's world, our personal information is recognized as private property. Any business that wants to use it — Google, Amazon, your cellphone carrier, your bank — would have to pay for the privilege, sending you a few bucks every time. Even the cops would have to pay you if they subpoenaed your cellphone records. Indeed, Lanier's plan has a clever side benefit — it protects our privacy by making it costly to spy on us.

Peter Lawler commented:

So Lanier gives us (Captain) "Kirk's wager." Let's be optimistic that the TV versions (as opposed to the dumb movies) of Star Trek, despite the silliness of the techno-details, are basically right. Our techno-future is not only about the endless procession of new gadgets and instruments but likely to be "a more moral, fun, adventurous, and sexy world."

Laurence Scott of The Guardian suggests that, though Lanier's vision of the future is intriguing, Lanier's unbridled love for Silicon Valley keeps the author from considering the negative psychological and social implications of a world saturated with data gathering, data analysis, and advertising. Nonetheless, Scott says:

And yet one of the triumphs of Lanier's intelligent and subtle book is its inspiring portrait of the kind of people that a democratic information economy would produce.

The Economist commented:

Mr Lanier has an audacious solution. If information is worth money (and the rise of companies trading on data would suggest that is the case) then people should be paid for what they contribute. He envisions a complicated mechanism in which services such as Facebook stop being free, but also stop obtaining data for nothing. Creators of data would be remunerated with millions of nanopayments; users of information would have to pay. Even the author admits this would be a hard sell.

The Independent said:

Lanier's explicit identification of his system with a bourgeois interest is also useful – as an alternative Marxist explanation is easily to hand. The forces of production are about to take another enormous leap forward, while the relations of production are straggling far behind.

Columbia Journalism Review:

Some of the most insightful passages in Lanier's book explain how themes of "self-actualization" borrowed from eastern religions have combined with Silicon Valley's tech bubble to build a faith in technology as the means to ultimate self-expression and self-perfection: "Going about my day," he writes, "there is nothing unusual at all about running into a friend at the coffee shop who is a for-real, serious scientist working on making people immortal."

The Daily Telegraph said:

Sensibly, Lanier doubts whether this will result in us all simply reclining in the lap of luxury. We may, of course, all become software programmers. Lanier makes a persuasive case, and it's hard to dispute his suggestions for the future until we get there. History, thankfully, suggests he will be proven wrong.

The Los Angeles Times noted:

His ideas for brokering those payments are a bit fuzzy and, because they'd require a two-way accounting of who does what where online, run counter to some of the underlying ideas of the Internet, both structurally and ideologically. He's able to layer his argument so that it makes sense to a Silicon Valley outsider, while communicating some of the insider's point of view.

The Washington Post review said:

Lost in his own brand of digital sophistry, Lanier never gets around to asking how a fully automated society ought to function. Is the idea of education embedded in massive online open courses worth embracing? Is automated journalism — with algorithms churning out trivial news stories — compatible with a democratic society? A clever micropayment system won't answer these questions.

In a somewhat critical review, Evan Hughes of The New Republic commented:

The failings of Lanier's vision, however, should not obscure his achievements. His book not only makes a convincing diagnosis of a widespread problem, but also answers a need for moonshot thinking. If the alternate society he proposes looks too flawed, he deserves to be applauded for at least putting one forward, no matter who might look at him funny while he gives his office-wide speech.

== See also ==
- Content farm
- Crowdsourcing
- Knowledge worker
- Open-source intelligence
- Post-scarcity
- Sharing economy
- Surveillance capitalism
- Social networking websites (category)
- Social media § Criticisms
- User-generated content
- The Wealth of Networks
