= Television consumption =

Major part of media consumption in Western culture

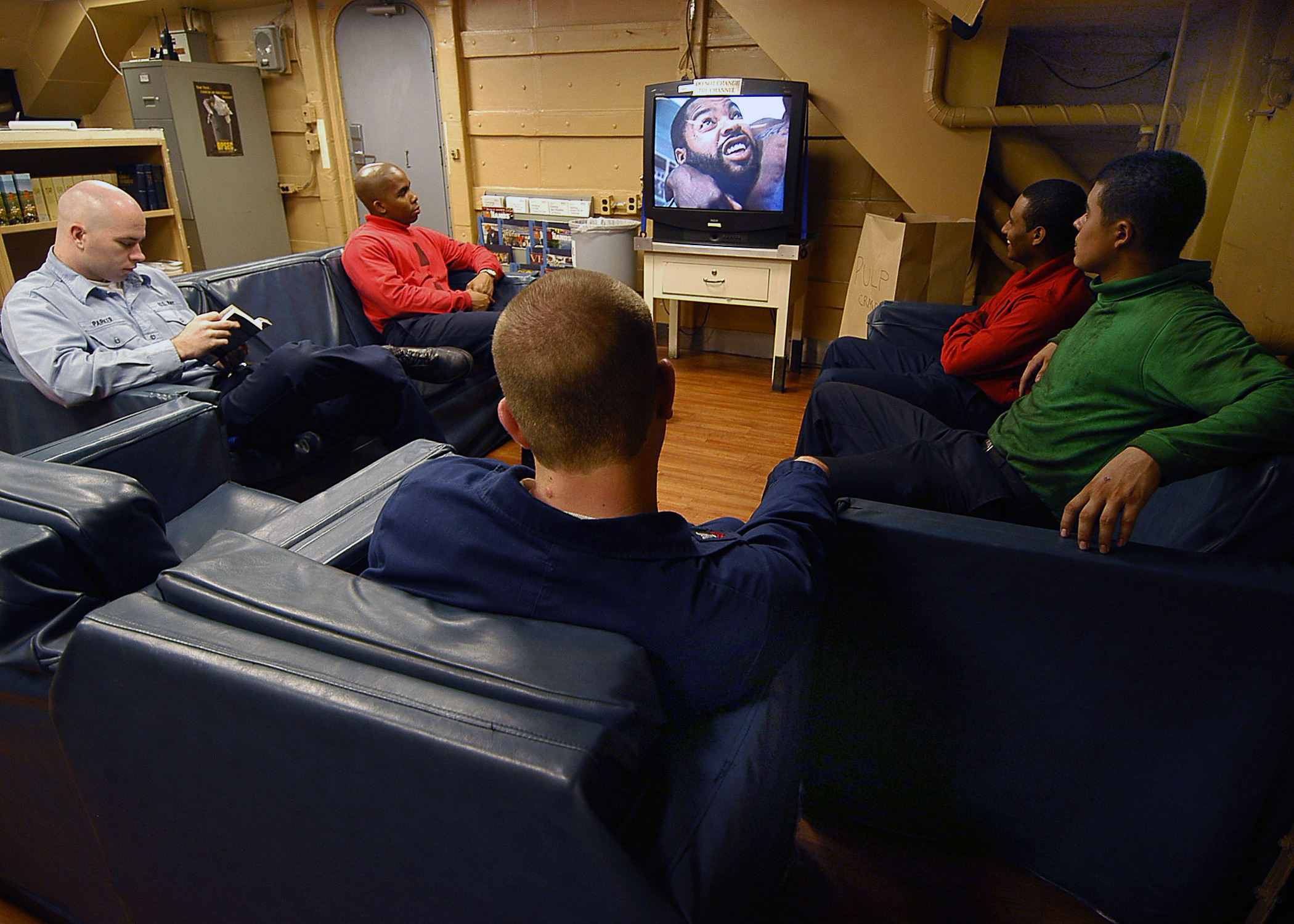
A group of people watching television

Television consumption constitutes a significant aspect of media consumption in Western culture. Similar to other high-consumption lifestyles, habitual television viewing is often driven by a pursuit of pleasure, escapism, or psychological numbing (sometimes described as "anesthetization"). Excessive television engagement has been compared to behavioral addictions, as it may align with established diagnostic criteria for addictive disorders, including impaired functioning in occupational, academic, or domestic settings. Research suggests that negative psychological, social, or physical consequences may arise from prolonged or compulsive consumption.

== Statistics ==
Television viewership has historically risen with the medium's accessibility, though younger demographics increasingly favor alternative forms of entertainment, contributing to a gradual decline in traditional TV consumption. Global television viewing peaked in 2020 during the COVID-19 pandemic lockdowns but decreased slightly to an average of 2 hours and 33 minutes daily by 2023. Despite this decline, screen-based content consumption persists, with audiences shifting toward streaming platforms accessed via smartphones, tablets, and laptops. Between May 2021 and May 2022, streaming service usage grew by 21%, accounting for 32% of total television time.

In early 2023, streaming platforms experienced a broad decline in weekly usage. A survey revealed Netflix retained its dominance at 68.3% of weekly users despite minor losses, while Disney+ dropped to 32.3% (down 5.4%) and Hulu fell to 42.6% (down 4.6%). Overall, 85% of respondents reported using at least one streaming service weekly, contrasted with 15% who did not.

=== Demographic patterns ===
From 2013 to 2017, adults aged 65 and older averaged 4.3 hours of daily television viewing—the highest among age groups—while those aged 25–34 watched the least (just over 2 hours daily). Employment status correlated with viewing habits: employed individuals (full- or part-time) watched approximately 2.2 hours daily, compared to 3.8 hours among the unemployed. As 80.2% of adults over 65 were not employed during this period, retirement likely contributed to their higher consumption, whereas younger demographics prioritized work and family commitments.

=== Advertising exposure ===
Approximately 30% of local TV news broadcast time is allocated to advertisements, resulting in the average person viewing 2 million TV commercials by age 65. In the United States, children typically see 20,000 thirty-second commercials annually. Time spent watching ads decreases when viewing recorded television, and studies suggest commercials are often ignored due to media multitasking behaviors.

== Change in consumption ==
The rise of streaming platforms and online television has driven a significant shift toward over-the-top (OTT) media services, disrupting traditional cable television markets. By 2013, 63% of U.S. households had adopted video streaming services, with 22% accessing Netflix weekly. In English Canada, 25% of households used Netflix, a figure rising to 33% among households with adolescent children. The platform's emphasis on on-demand, commercial-free content across devices has redefined viewer habits, accelerating the transition to digital consumption.

The COVID-19 pandemic further amplified television-related leisure activities, as lockdowns limited travel, work commutes, and outdoor recreation. Studies conducted between May and December 2020 revealed that Americans averaged 3.1 hours of daily screen time dedicated to television content, including cable, DVDs, streaming, and mobile device viewing. In 2020, television-based activities—spanning traditional broadcasts, streaming services, and portable devices—constituted the most time-consuming leisure pursuit in the United States.

== Binge-watching ==
Binge-watching refers to the practice of viewing multiple episodes of a television series consecutively in a single session. The behavior became prevalent in the Digital Age, facilitated by streaming platforms offering on-demand access, advancements in technology, and lower costs for high-bandwidth internet. Proponents argue that binge-watching enhances comprehension of narrative arcs and character development compared to episodic viewing, prompting scholars and industry analysts to study viewer motivations through uses and gratifications theory to optimize content delivery. Related viewing practices, while distinct from binge-watching, include Comfort television, in which viewers repeatedly engage with familiar content for relaxation or emotional regulation.

=== Trends and examples ===
In 2013, Netflix pioneered full-season releases for original series, accelerating binge-watching trends. When Arrested Development (Season 4) debuted in summer 2013, 10% of viewers completed the season within 24 hours. Similarly, House of Cards and Orange Is the New Black saw significant audiences finishing entire seasons within days of release, regardless of genre differences.

=== Risks and psychological impacts ===
Excessive binge-watching has been linked to symptoms of behavioral addiction, with researchers comparing its compulsive gratification-seeking mechanisms to problematic gambling. Common motivations include escapism and alleviating loneliness, particularly among vulnerable individuals. These motivations also overlap with practices such as Comfort television, in which viewers return to familiar programs for emotional comfort and stress relief. While not inherently harmful, compulsive binge-watching may correlate with pre-existing mental health conditions such as depression or social anxiety, potentially exacerbating these issues.

=== Demographics ===
A 2013 study found that 62% of U.S. adults engaged in regular binge-watching, with higher prevalence among those aged 18–39 compared to older demographics. Gender differences were minimal overall but influenced genre preferences. Subsequent research associates binge-watching with patterns seen in video game and social media addiction, characterized by immediate gratification and loss of self-control. Additionally, studies by Merrill and Rubenking suggest a correlation between binge-watching and procrastination behaviors.

== Effects of television consumption ==
Excessive television consumption, particularly through prolonged viewing or binge-watching, has been linked to adverse physical, psychological, and social outcomes.

=== Obesity ===
Television viewing is correlated with sedentary behavior and childhood obesity across multiple cultures. In the United States, adolescents who engage in prolonged screen time while consuming sugary drinks exhibit heightened energy intake, contributing to weight gain. Children under 15 are particularly vulnerable, as those watching over two hours daily are twice as likely to develop obesity compared to peers with limited screen time. Screen exposure also increases cravings for calorie-dense foods, exacerbated by frequent advertisements for fast food and snacks.

A study of 15,000 U.S. high school students found 43% exceeded two hours of daily TV viewing on school days, with 31% reporting no daily physical activity, 11% classified as overweight, and 76% consuming insufficient fruits and vegetables. Correlations between screen time and obesity were significant for White males, White females, and Hispanic females, while Black males showed increased physical activity with higher TV consumption. No association was observed for Black females or Hispanic males.

=== Body image attitudes ===
Television frequently promotes narrow beauty standards, emphasizing thinness for women and muscularity for men. Underrepresented audiences may internalize these ideals, leading to diminished self-esteem among adolescents who perceive their bodies as socially inadequate. While entertainment remains a primary motive for viewing, escapism and social learning through TV correlate more strongly with negative body image outcomes.

Characters conforming to conventional attractiveness are often portrayed as successful or heroic, whereas those deviating from these norms are frequently relegated to comedic or marginalized roles. Such portrayals reinforce the "thin ideal," perpetuating the notion that physical appearance dictates social value and access to opportunities.

=== Crime shows and attitudes towards crime ===
Crime-themed programming often distorts public understanding of law enforcement and criminal justice. Heavy viewers of local news and crime dramas overestimate societal violence and hold unrealistic expectations of policing efficacy. While regular crime show consumption does not correlate with punitive attitudes or perceived police effectiveness, it may amplify fear of crime.

Research indicates program content—not viewing duration—shapes audience perceptions. Shows emphasizing graphic violence or fear-driven narratives are more likely to skew viewers' perceptions of real-world crime risks.

== Global trends in television consumption ==
=== Historical rankings ===
Global television viewing habits have varied significantly by region and year. In 2015, the United States led in daily TV viewing time, followed by Poland, Japan, Italy, and Russia. Earlier statistics from 2014 placed the United Kingdom first, ahead of the United States, France, Indonesia, Kenya, and Nigeria. In 2002, the U.S. and U.K. tied at 28 hours of weekly viewing per person, with Italy, Germany, France, and Ireland trailing closely.

=== Pandemic impact ===
The COVID-19 pandemic dramatically increased television consumption worldwide. In Europe, midday news viewership doubled, with the largest growth (20%) among younger audiences. U.S. data from early 2020 showed a 60% surge in overall TV consumption, a 42% rise in evening news viewership, and a 92% increase in cable news audiences compared to pre-pandemic levels.

=== Contemporary shifts ===
As of 2023, global media consumption averages approximately 455 minutes daily, though traditional TV viewership among adults aged 18–34 declined by 14% between 2015 and 2020. This shift reflects the rise of mobile streaming, social media, and gaming. Despite these trends, broadcast television remains widely used for news and entertainment; Japan, for example, reported daily TV viewership of 3 hours and 42 minutes in 2019. Paid video-on-demand (VOD) subscriptions are projected to reach 1.79 billion globally in 2023, driven by streaming accessibility and diverse content offerings.

Average media consumption (minutes per day) in 2015
Region	min/day
Asia Pacific	154.5
Central and Eastern Europe	222.9
Latin America	199.0
North America	292.6
MENA	249.7
Western Europe	220.5
Rest of world	211.0

== See also ==
- Decline of newspapers
- Digital divide
- Internet television (Online TV)
- People meter
- Smart TV
- Social aspects of television
- Streaming service
- Television addiction
- Television advertising
- Television program
- Television studies
