= White Dot =

UK-based anti-television organization

White Dot is an anti-television organisation based in the UK. It encourages people to not watch television, and also to switch off televisions in cafés and pubs with devices such as the TV-B-Gone. It also organises what it calls zocalo (a Mexican term for a town square) events where people are requested to turn off their televisions, go outside and talk to their neighbours.

The organisation is named after the white dot that appeared in the middle of old CRT television screens when switched off—as the capacitors discharged, the cathode ray would continue to emit electrons although no longer being controlled horizontally or vertically.

White Dot is based in the area around Brighton in England. It is a member of the United States-based TV turnoff organisation.

It is a part of an anti-television movement. It is associated with Cornfield electronics, the manufacturer of TV-B-Gone, and has published two books- Get A Life! The Little Red Book of White Dot, and Spy TV: About Interactive Television.

== See also ==
- TV turnoff
