= The Philosopher's Zone =

Australian radio program

- Genre: Discussion
- Running time: Approx. 25 minutes
- Country of origin: Australia
- Language: English
- Home station: ABC Radio National
- Hosted by: Alan Saunders, Joe Gelonesi, David Rutledge
- Original release: January 2005 – present
- No. of episodes: more than 240
- Website: www.abc.net.au/radionational/programs/philosopherszone/ www.abc.net.au/radionational/programs/philosopherszone/past-programs/

The Philosopher's Zone is a weekly ABC Radio National radio discussion series exploring philosophical issues.
