= Screen-Free Week =

Annual event

- Date: Officially first week of May
- Frequency: Annually
- Inaugurated: 1994
- Website: www.screenfree.org

Screen-Free Week (formerly TV Turnoff Week and Digital Detox Week) is an annual event where children, families, schools and communities around the world are encouraged to turn off screens and engage in life. Instead of relying on screen-related media such as television programming or video games for entertainment, participants read, daydream, explore, enjoy nature, and spend time with family and friends.

In 2010, Campaign for a Commercial-Free Childhood (CCFC) (rebranded to Fairplay) became the home of Screen-Free Week at the request of the Board of the Center for SCREEN-TIME Awareness (CSTA), which ran the initiative since 1994. CCFC launched a new website and developed a new Organizer's Kit, fact sheets, and other materials for Screen-Free Week 2011 and beyond. The Screen-Free Week Organizer's Kit is available as a free download.

== History ==
In 1994, the week was first championed by TV-Free America and its founders Henry Labalme and Matt Pawa, and promoted by Adbusters magazine and other organizations.

In 2008, Adbusters changed the name of TV Turnoff Week to Digital Detox Week to reflect the growing predominance of computers and other digital devices.

CCFC changed the name of TV-Turnoff Week to Screen-Free Week in 2010, since entertainment media (and advertising) are increasingly delivered through a variety of screens (computers, hand-held devices, etc.), and not just traditional television commercials.

In January 2025, CCFC handed over control of the event to International Play Association USA as CCFC stepped away as main contributor.

== Members and supporters ==
Important members of the network include Adbusters in Canada and White Dot in the UK (named after the small white dot that would briefly appear when turning off older TV sets, especially black-and-white ones). In Brazil, Alana promotes the Semana sem telas.

More than seventy other organizations, such as the American Heart Association, the American Medical Association, Big Brothers Big Sisters of America, the YMCA, and the Association of Waldorf Schools of North America (AWSNA) support the movement in the US. In 2004, the American Academy of Pediatrics also backed up the event.

== See also ==
- Culture jamming
- Digital addict
- Digital detox
- Four Arguments for the Elimination of Television
- History of television
- Media psychology
- Social aspects of television
- Television studies
