= List of video game genres =

A video game genre is a specific category of games related by similar gameplay characteristics. Video game genres are not usually defined by the setting or story of the game or its medium of play, but by the way the player interacts with the game. For example, a first-person shooter is still a first-person shooter regardless of whether it takes place in a science fiction, western, fantasy, or military setting, so long as it features a camera mimicking the perspective of the protagonist (first-person) and gameplay centered around the use of ranged weaponry.

Genres may encompass a wide variety of games, leading to even more specific classifications called subgenres. For example, an action game can be classified into many subgenres such as platform games and fighting games. Some games, most notably browser and mobile games, are commonly classified into multiple genres.

The following is a list of most commonly defined video game genres, with short descriptions for individual genres and major subgenres.

== Action ==
Action games emphasize physical challenges that require hand-eye coordination and motor skill to overcome. They center around the player, who is in control of most of the action. Most of the earliest video games were considered action games. Today, it is still a vast genre covering all games that involve physical challenges.

Action games are classified by many subgenres. Platform games and fighting games are among the best-known subgenres, while shooter games became and continue to be one of the dominant genres in video gaming since the 1990s. Action games usually involve elements of twitch gameplay.

=== Platform games ===
Platform games feature vertical environments with leaping and climbing between suspended platforms, hence the name platform game.

Platform games, or platformers, have gameplay primarily centered around jumping and climbing to navigate the player's environment. They may have enemies or obstacles to avoid and fight or may just be pure jumping puzzles. Generally the playable characters in a platform game are able to jump many times their own height and the player is offered some control over their movement in midair as well as the height and distance of their jumps. Settings tend to be vertically exaggerated with much uneven terrain that the player can leap up to or fall off of.

Donkey Kong (1981) was one of the earliest and best-known platformers. The American gaming press classified it using the term climbing game at the time. Super Mario Bros. (1985), a platformer, was one of the best-selling games of all time, with more than 40 million copies sold.

=== Shooter games ===
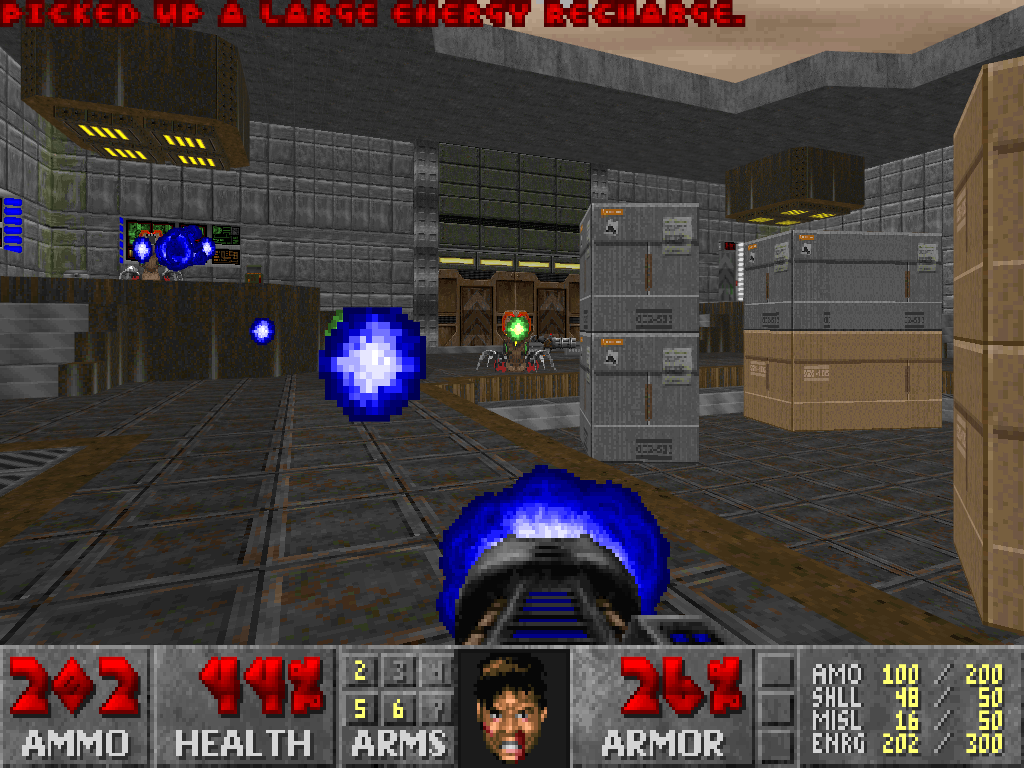
This picture shows gameplay of a freely licensed version of Doom, a highly influential first-person shooter.

In shooter games, or simply shooters, players use ranged weapons to participate in the action, which takes place at a distance. Most shooters involve violent gameplay. Lethal weaponry is used to damage opponents. However, some shooters, such as Splatoon, have non-violent objectives.

Since the 1990s, shooters, most notably first-person shooters, have become widely successful in video gaming, accounting for a large percentage of video game sales. Wolfenstein 3D, created by Id Software and released in 1992, was credited for pioneering gameplay and graphics elements incorporated by many other shooters. Also developed by Id and published one year after Wolfenstein 3D's release, Doom is broadly considered to be one of the most influential games in video gaming history. Other successful shooter series include Half-Life, a widely acclaimed and commercially successful series noted for its influence on contemporary shooters, and the Call of Duty franchise, with more than 250 million sales across all its titles.

Shooters, aside from subgenre classifications, can be further classified by their perspective of play.

==== First-person shooters ====
First-person shooters are played within the protagonist's perspective. They often include a heads-up display showing key information such as the current health of the protagonist.

==== Third-Person Shooters ====
In third-person shooters are Shooter games where the protagonist's body can be seen fully. The environment is rendered from a distance. Some shooters incorporate both perspectives.

==== Hero shooters ====
Hero shooters are either first- or third-person multiplayer shooters that emphasize pre-designed "hero" characters, with each possessing distinctive abilities and/or weapons that are specific to them. Hero shooters strongly encourage teamwork between players on a team, guiding players to select effective combinations of hero characters and coordinate the use of hero abilities during a match. Outside of a match, players have the ability to customize the appearance of the heroes but with no other in-game effects. Hero shooters are inspired by the multiplayer online battle arena genre, and popular team-based shooters like Team Fortress 2. Examples of hero shooters include Overwatch, Paladins, Apex Legends, and Valorant.

==== Light gun shooters ====
Light gun shooters are controlled with a gun-shaped controller. Light guns function via a light sensor, hence the name "light gun". The technology has been used as early as the 1920s for shooter games, although electronic video gaming did not exist at that time. A popular light gun shooter is Duck Hunt.

==== Shoot 'em ups ====
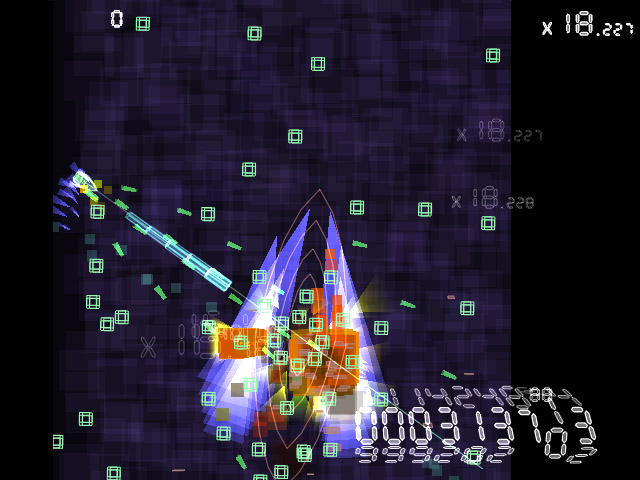
This picture shows gameplay of a shoot 'em up.

Shoot 'em ups pit players, who are usually piloting some form of flying vehicle, or flying by some other means, against large waves of opponents. The player is continuously moving and must attack and avoid opponent's attacks as well as obstacles.

=== Fighting games ===
Fighting games center around close-ranged combat, typically one-on-one fights or against a small number of equally powerful opponents, often involving violent and exaggerated unarmed attacks. Most fighting games feature a large number of playable characters and a competitive multiplayer mode. While most fighting games emphasize hand-to-hand combat, some fighting games such as Soulcalibur and Samurai Shodown center around combat with melee weapons. Many fighting games incorporate heavily emphasized attacks based on various martial arts systems. Fighting games were one of the dominant genres in video gaming until the late-1990s, where the genre saw a slight decline.

This decline was short-lived, for titles such as Mortal Kombat, Street Fighter, Tekken, and Super Smash Bros. dominate the fighter demographic of the modern era. Different sub-genre games are starting to become more popular. Super Smash Bros., and its deviation from the traditional fighting game rule set, gained a large following because of its "fun over form" party game development mentality.

=== Beat 'em up games ===
Beat 'em ups, or brawlers, are a related, but distinct genre to fighting games. While they both involve close-range combat, beat 'em ups put players against large waves of opponents as opposed to a few. Beat 'em ups often incorporate mechanics from other action genres, and multiplayer in beat 'em up games tends to be co-operative rather than competitive. Beat 'em ups saw a sudden decline in popularity in the early 1990s with the release of fighting games, but 3D beat 'em ups have kept the genre alive. Hack and slash is a sub-genre often used to refer to weapons based beat 'em ups.

=== Stealth games ===
These games tend to emphasize sneaking around and avoiding enemy notice over direct conflict, for example, the Metal Gear series, and the Sly Cooper series. In a Stealth game, players are usually still able to engage in loud, conspicuous combat, but are often punished for it. In other games, such as Dishonored, the player can obtain their goal with or without stealth, but stealth is encouraged as the player is at a disadvantage over many of their enemies. The inclusion of stealth as a mechanic in a game does not necessarily make it a Stealth Game. For example, Skyrim has an entire perk tree dedicated to "Sneaking" despite that most of the dungeons in the game can be completed using a hack-and-slash strategy.

The first stealth game was Manbiki Shounen (Shoplifting Boy), published in November 1979. The PET 2001 personal computer game was developed by Hiroshi Suzuki.

Hideo Kojima's Metal Gear was the first mainstream stealth game, with the player starting the game unarmed, and sold over a million copies in the United States. Metal Gear 2: Solid Snake evolved the stealth gameplay of its predecessor. Metal Gear and Metal Gear 2 are credited with pioneering stealth mechanics. Metal Gear Solid, which debuted at the 1996 Tokyo Game Show, was the first 3D stealth game, and is credited with popularizing the stealth game genre, as well as the hiding-behind-cover mechanic.

=== Survival games ===
Survival games start the player off with minimal resources, in a hostile, open-world environment, and require them to collect resources, craft tools, weapons, and shelter, in order to survive as long as possible. Many are set in procedurally generated environments, and are open-ended with no set goals. They may overlap with the survival horror genre, in which the player must survive within a supernatural setting, such as a zombie apocalypse.

=== Rhythm games ===
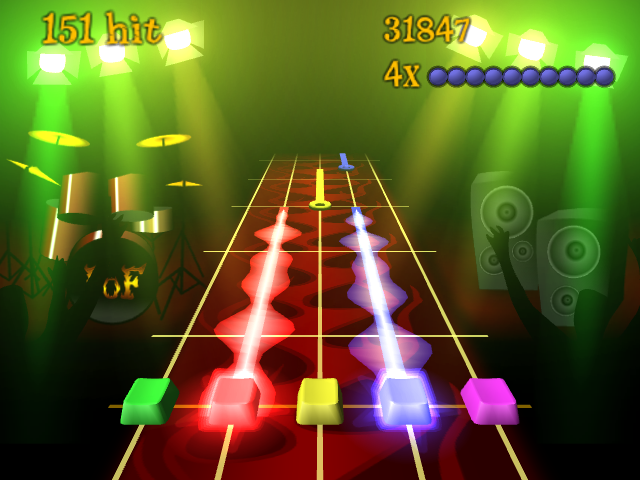
Frets on Fire is a music game.

Rhythm game or rhythm action is a genre of music-themed action video game that challenges a player's sense of rhythm. The genre includes dance games such as Dance Dance Revolution and music-based games such as Rock Band and Guitar Hero. Games in the genre challenge the player to press buttons at precise times: the screen shows which button the player is required to press, and the game awards points both for accuracy and for synchronization with the beat.

PaRappa the Rapper has been deemed the first influential rhythm game; whose basic template formed the core of subsequent games in the genre. Other popular rhythm games include Dance Dance Revolution, Maimai, Project Diva, Cytus, Love Live: School Idol Festival, The Idolmaster, osu!, Taiko no Tatsujin, and Crypt of the Necrodancer.

=== Battle royale games ===
A battle royale game is a genre that blends the survival, exploration and scavenging elements of a survival game with last man standing gameplay. Battle royale games challenge a large number of players, starting with minimal equipment, to search for weapons and armor and eliminate other opponents, while trying to stay in safe playable area which shrinks as the time passes, with the winner being the last competitor in the game. Notable battle royale games include PlayerUnknown's Battlegrounds, Fortnite Battle Royale, Free Fire, Apex Legends, and Call of Duty: Warzone, each having received tens of millions of players within months of their releases.

== Action-adventure ==
Although action-adventure games can divide into action or adventure games, they combine elements of their two component genres, typically featuring long-term obstacles that must be overcome using a tool or item as leverage, which is collected earlier, as well as many smaller obstacles almost constantly in the way, that require elements of action games to overcome. Action-adventure games tend to focus on exploration and usually involve item gathering, simple puzzle solving, and combat. "Action-adventure" has become a label which is sometimes attached to games which do not fit neatly into another well known genre. Because of their prevalence on video game consoles and the absence of typical adventure games, action-adventure games are often called "adventure games" by modern gamers.

One of the first action-adventure games was the Atari 2600 game Adventure (1980). It was directly inspired by the original text adventure, Colossal Cave Adventure. In the process of adapting a text game to a console with only a joystick for control, designer Warren Robinett created an action-adventure game by incorporating action arcade game elements.

The action-adventure later became an established genre with Shigeru Miyamoto's The Legend of Zelda (1986), which became a success due to how it combined elements from different genres to create a compelling hybrid, including exploration, transport puzzles, adventure-style inventory puzzles, an action component, a monetary system, and simplified RPG-style level building without the experience points. The game was also an early example of open world, non-linear gameplay, and introduced innovations like saving on battery backup. It became one of the most influential games of the 8-bit era, inspiring action-adventures like Metroid and RPGs like Final Fantasy. Zelda has since remained the most prolific action-adventure game series through to the present day.

=== Survival horror ===
Survival horror games focus on fear and attempt to scare the player via traditional horror fiction elements such as atmospherics, death, the undead, blood and gore. One crucial gameplay element in many of these games is the low quantity of ammunition, or number of breakable melee weapons. Notable examples include Silent Hill and Resident Evil.

The first survival horror game was AX-2: Uchuu Yusousen Nostromo (AX－2 宇宙輸送船ノストロモ), developed by Akira Takiguchi, a Tokyo University student and Taito contractor, for the PET 2001. It was ported to the PC-6001 by Masakuni Mitsuhashi (also known as Hiromi Ohba, later joined Game Arts), and published by ASCII in 1981, exclusively for Japan.

=== Metroidvania ===
Metroidvania games are a subgenre of platformer, named after its two first well-known franchises, Metroid and Castlevania. They feature large interconnected world maps the player can explore, but access to parts of the world is limited by doors or other obstacles that can only be opened after the player has acquired special tools, weapons or abilities within the game. Acquiring such improvements also aids the player in defeating more difficult enemies and locating shortcuts and secret areas, and often includes retracing one's steps across the map. Metroidvanias usually do not consist of any linear gameplay and often involve much backtracking – especially after new power-ups or tools have been obtained. Games include: Hollow Knight, Hollow Knight: Silksong, Dead Cells and Nine Sols, Each being a mix of Metroid and Castlevania and adding to it or being a twist on those games.

== Adventure ==
Adventure games were some of the earliest games created, beginning with the text adventure Colossal Cave Adventure in the 1970s. That game was originally titled simply "Adventure," and is the namesake of the genre. Over time, graphics have been introduced to the genre and the interface has evolved.

Unlike adventure films, adventure games are not defined by story or content. Rather, adventure describes a manner of gameplay without reflex challenges or action. They normally require the player to solve various puzzles by interacting with people or the environment, most often in a non-confrontational way. It is considered a "purist" genre and tends to exclude anything which includes action elements beyond a mini game.

Because they put little pressure on the player in the form of action-based challenges or time constraints, adventure games have had the unique ability to appeal to people who do not normally play video games. The genre peaked in popularity with the 1993 release of Myst, the best-selling PC game of all time up to that point. The simple point and click interface, detailed worlds and casual pace made it accessible, and its sense of artistic surrealism caused news outlets such as Wired Magazine, The New York Times, and the San Francisco Chronicle to declare that the gaming industry had matured. It had four proper sequels, but none managed to experience the same level of success. The success of Myst also inspired many others to create similar games with first person perspectives, surreal environments and minimal or no dialogue, but these neither recaptured the success of Myst nor of earlier personality-driven adventures.

In the late 1990s the genre suffered a large drop in popularity, mass-market releases became rare, and many proclaimed the adventure game to be dead. More accurately, it has become a niche genre. Adventure games are not entirely uncommon, but they tend to be very low budget in anticipation of modest sales. The genre was somewhat rejuvenated with the release of The Longest Journey in 1999, which emphasized stronger story elements and more interaction with different characters. A recent resurgence of adventure games on Nintendo consoles might signify a new interest in the genre. A successful Kickstarter campaign in 2012, run by Doublefine Studios, also spoke to the continued interest in Adventure games. The game produced as a result was mired in controversy and production delays, and to some, signalled the true end of the genre outside of niche markets.

=== Text adventures ===
The earliest adventure games were text adventures, also known as interactive fiction. Games such as the popular Zork series of the late 1970s and early 1980s allowed the player to use a keyboard to enter commands such as "get rope" or "go west" while the computer describes what is happening. A great deal of programming went into parsing the player's text input.

=== Graphic adventures ===
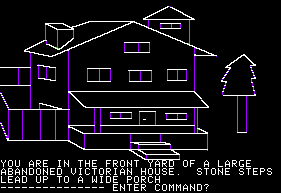
Mystery House for the Apple II was the first adventure game to use graphics in the early home computer era.

Adventure games emerged as graphics became more common. Adventure games began to supplement and later on replace textual descriptions with visuals, for example, a picture of the current location. Early graphic adventure games used text-parsers to input commands. The growing use of computer mice led to the "point-and-click" genre of adventure games, where the player would no longer have to type commands. The player could, for example, click on a hand icon and then on a rope to pick up the rope.

=== Visual novels ===
A visual novel (ビジュアルノベル, bijuaru noberu) is a game featuring mostly static graphics, usually with anime-style art. As the name might suggest, they resemble mixed-media novels or tableau vivant stage plays. Many visual novels track statistics that the player must build in order to advance the plot, and permit a variety of endings, allowing more dynamic reactions to the player's actions than a typical linear adventure plot. Many visual novels are dating sims, including bishōjo games.

Visual novels are especially prevalent in Japan, where in the mid-2000s they made up nearly 70% of PC games released. They are rarely produced for video game consoles, but the more popular games are sometimes ported to systems such as the Dreamcast or the PlayStation 2. The market for visual novels outside Japan, was nearly non-existent prior to the success of the Nintendo DS, for which several Japanese visual novels were released in the West, such as the Ace Attorney series and the School Days series.

=== Interactive movie ===
The interactive movie genre came about with the invention of laserdiscs. An interactive movie contains pre-filmed full-motion cartoons or live-action sequences, where the player controls some of the moves of the main character. For example, when in danger, the player decides which move, action, or combination to choose. In these games, the only activity the player has is to choose or guess the move the designers intend them to make. Interactive movies usually differ from games that simply use full motion video, FMV, extensively between scenes in that they try to integrate it into the gameplay itself. This has been used in everything from racing games to fighting games.

A few adventure game have tried to use the term to liken the storytelling of their games to those in movies, most notably the later Tex Murphy games and the more recent Fahrenheit (Indigo Prophecy), although they are more aptly classified as genre hybrids. Elements of interactive movies have been adapted for game cut scenes, in the form of Quick Time Events, to keep the player alert. Games like Resident Evil 4 present obvious in-game prompts for the player to react to. Not doing so usually results in the player character either getting hurt or outright killed.

== Puzzle ==
Whether simple adaptations of real-world puzzles like Sudoku or full-blown puzzle games meant to be explored in a video game environment, there's a lot of variety on offer. They test the player's problem-solving skills including logic, pattern recognition, sequence solving, and word completion. Puzzle games continue to find millions of fans, especially on mobile devices where casual games and tile-matching puzzle games are extremely popular.

Puzzle games focus on logical and conceptual challenges, although some of them also include a real-time component and require quick thinking. While many action games and adventure games include puzzle elements in level design, a true puzzle game focuses on puzzle solving as its primary gameplay activity. This genre sometimes crosses over with educational games.

Rather than presenting a random collection of puzzles to solve, puzzle games typically offer a series of related puzzles that are a variation on a single theme. This theme could involve pattern recognition, logic, or understanding a process. These games usually have a set of rules or mechanics, where players manipulate game pieces on a grid, network or other interaction space. Players must unravel clues in order to achieve some victory condition, which will then allow them to advance to the next level. Completing each puzzle will usually lead to a more difficult challenge.

=== Breakout clone game ===
Breakout clone, also known as block-breaking or ball-and-paddle, is a sub-class of the puzzle genre. This genre is named for the dynamics of the player-controlled block (called a "paddle") which the game is based on that hits a ball towards different objects such as colored tiles, special tiles and indestructible tiles, called a "brick". The term "brick buster" was coined in the early 2000s, mostly refers to more modern games. Some early examples is Arkanoid developed by Taito in 1986 and the original Breakout developed by Atari in 1976.

=== Logical game ===
Logical puzzle games exhibit logic and mechanisms that are consistent throughout the entire game. Solving them typically requires deductive reasoning skills.

==== Physics game ====
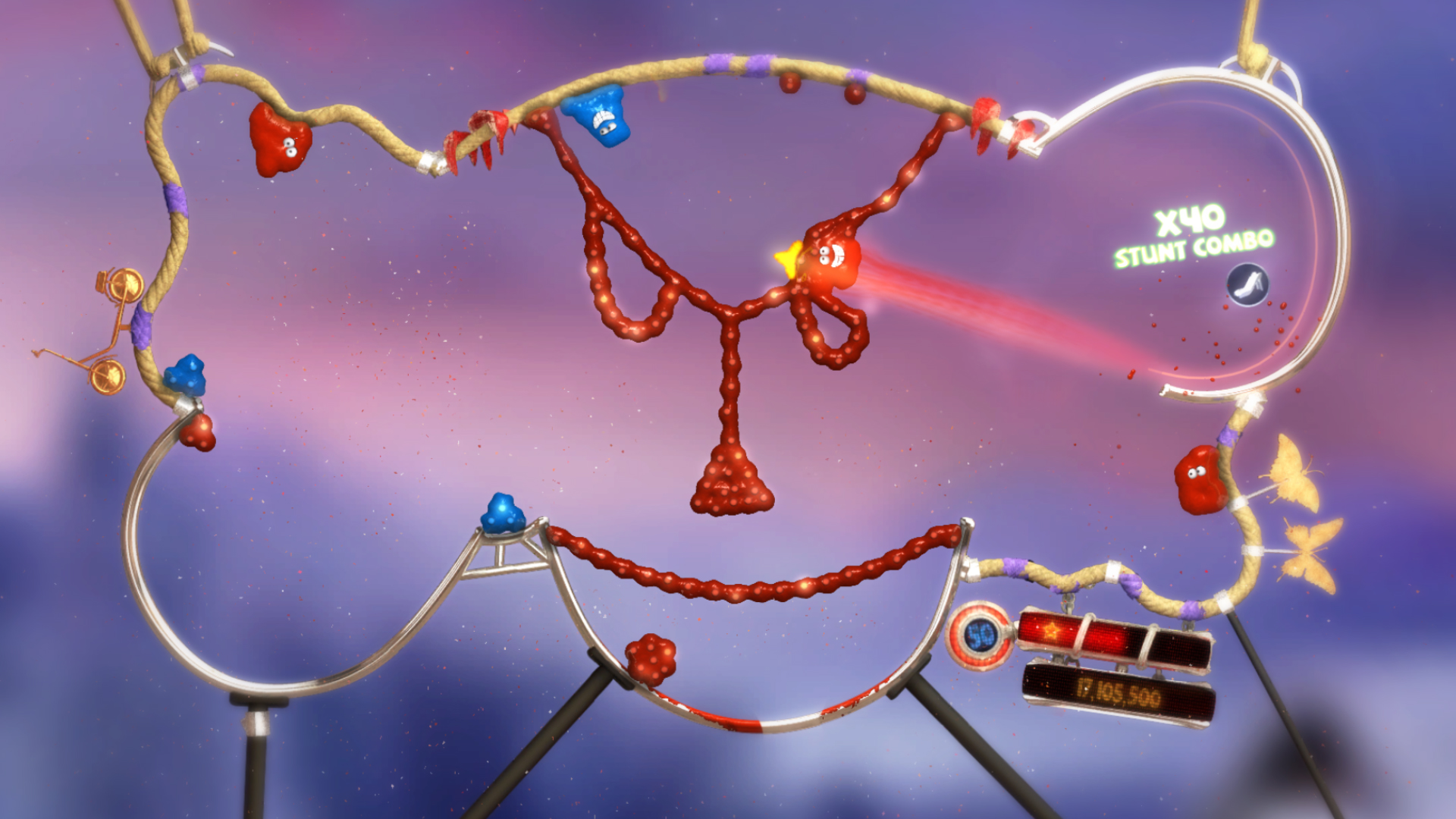
The Splatters, a physics based Xbox Live Arcade game

A physics game is a type of logical puzzle video game where the player must use the game's physics and environment to complete each puzzle. Physics games use consistent physics to make games more challenging. The genre is especially popular in online flash games and mobile games. Educators have used these games to demonstrate principles of physics.

Popular physics-based logic puzzle games include Portal, The Talos Principle, Braid, Fez, World of Goo, Cut the Rope, and Inside.

These also include projectile collision games such as Angry Birds, Peggle, Monster Strike, and Crush the Castle.

==== Programming game ====
A programming game is a computer game where the player has limited or no direct influence on the course of the game. Instead, a computer program or script is written in some domain-specific programming language in order to control the actions of the characters, usually robots, tanks or bacteria. In SpaceChem, for example, players design circuits used for creating molecules from raw materials.

Examples include The Incredible Machine, SpaceChem, Infinifactory, and Shenzhen I/O. A few strategy games, such as Final Fantasy XII, also include some elements of a programming game, as the player can customize the playable characters' AI, although the player can also choose to directly control the action.

==== Puzzle-platform game ====
Puzzle platformers are characterized by their use of a platform game structure to drive a game whose challenge is derived primarily from puzzles.

Enix's 1983 release Door Door and Sega's 1985 release Doki Doki Penguin Land (for the SG-1000) are perhaps the first examples, though the genre is diverse, and classifications can vary. Doki Doki Penguin Land allowed players to run and jump in typical platform fashion, but they could also destroy blocks, and were tasked with guiding an egg to the bottom of the level without letting it break.

The Lost Vikings (1993) was a popular game in this genre. It has three characters players can switch between, each with different abilities. All three characters are needed to complete the level goals.

Wario Land 2 moved the Wario series into the puzzle-platform genre by eliminating the element of death and adding temporary injuries, such as being squashed or lit on fire, and specialized powers.

=== Hidden object game ===
A hidden object game (sometimes called hidden picture or hidden object puzzle adventure (HOPA)) is a genre of puzzle video game in which the player must find items from a list that are hidden within a scene. Hidden object games are a popular trend in casual gaming, and are comparatively inexpensive to buy. Mystery Case Files: Huntsville, released by Big Fish Games in 2005, is considered the first modern hidden objects game, coming at the rise of casual gaming in the mid-2000s.

=== Reveal the picture game ===
A reveal the picture game is a type of puzzle game that features piece-by-piece revealing of a photo or picture.

=== Tile-matching game ===
In tile-matching video games, the player manipulates tiles in order to make them disappear according to a matching criterion. The genre began with 1985's Chain Shot! and has similarities to "falling block" games such as Tetris. This genre includes games that require pieces to be swapped such as Bejeweled or Candy Crush Saga, games that adapt the classic tile-based game Mahjong such as Mahjong Trails, and games in which pieces are shot on the board such as Zuma. In many recent tile-matching games, the matching criterion is to place a given number of tiles of the same type so that they adjoin each other. That number is often three, and the corresponding subset of tile-matching games is referred to as "match-three games". Other examples include Threes and Lumines.

=== Traditional puzzle game ===
There have also been many digital adaptations of traditional puzzle games, including solitaire and mahjong solitaire. Even familiar word puzzles, number puzzles, and association puzzles have been adapted as games such as Dr. Kawashima's Brain Training.

== Role-playing ==
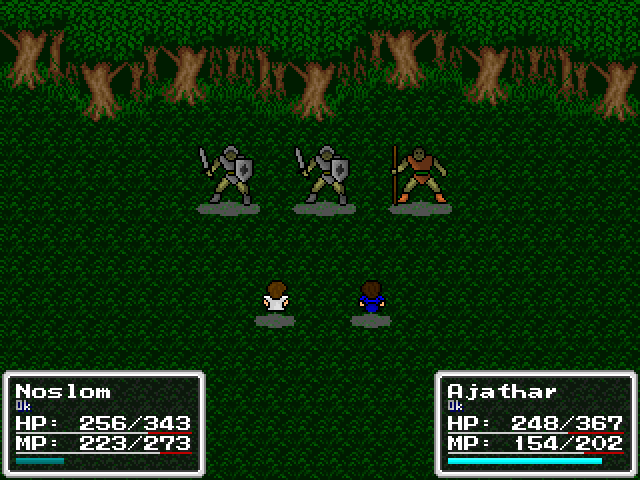
KQ is a role-playing game.

Role-playing video games draw their gameplay from traditional tabletop role-playing games like Dungeons & Dragons. Most of these games cast the player in the role of a character that grows in strength and experience over the course of the game. By overcoming difficult challenges and/or defeating monsters, the player gains experience points which represent the character's progress in a chosen profession or class, such as melee combat or ranged magic spells, and allow the player to gain new abilities once a set amount are obtained.

Many RPGs contain an open world known as an overworld, which is usually populated with monsters, that allows access to more important game locations, such as towns, dungeons, and castles. Since the emergence of affordable home computers coincided with the popularity of paper and pencil role-playing games, this genre was one of the first in video games and continues to be popular today. Gameplay elements strongly associated with RPG, such as statistical character development through the acquisition of experience points, have been widely adapted to other genres such as action-adventure games.

Though nearly all of the early entries in the genre were turn-based games, many modern role-playing games progress in real-time. Thus, the genre has followed the strategy game's trend of moving from turn-based to real-time combat. The move to real-time combat began with the release of Square's, now Square Enix's Final Fantasy IV, the first game to use the Active Time Battle system. This was quickly followed by truly real-time action role-playing games such as the Mana series, Soul Blazer and Ultima VII. Although older turn-based system still exist, such as the Golden Sun series for Game Boy Advance as well as Pokémon.

=== Action RPG ===
Video showing basic point and click action RPG gameplay

The action role-playing game (ARPG) is a type of role-playing video game which incorporates real-time combat as opposed to turn-based or menu-based, often borrowing elements from action games or action-adventure games. Some of the first action role-playing games were produced by Nihon Falcom in the 1980s, such as the Dragon Slayer series and the Ys series. Later so-called "Diablo clones" are also part of this genre. Although the precise definition of the genre varies, the typical action RPG features a heavy emphasis on combat, often simplifying or removing non-combat attributes and statistics and the effect they have on the character's development. Combat always takes place using a real-time system, hence the "action", that relies on the player's ability to perform particular actions with speed and accuracy to determine success, rather than mainly using the player character's attributes to determine this.

=== CRPG ===
Computer role-playing games, or CRPGs, are a style of RPG meant to mimic the gameplay of tabletop role-playing games. CRPGs represent some of the earliest RPG video games, including Dungeon and Moria, both from the mid-1970s. More modern examples include Planescape: Torment, Disco Elysium, Solasta: Crown of the Magister and the Baldur's Gate series.

=== MMORPG ===
Massively multiplayer online role-playing games, or MMORPGs, emerged in the mid to late 1990s as a commercial, graphical variant of text-based MUDs, which had existed since 1978. By and large, MMORPGs feature the usual RPG objectives of completing quests and strengthening one's player character, but involve up to hundreds of players interacting with each other on the same persistent world in real-time. The massively multiplayer concept was quickly combined with other genres.

Fantasy MMORPGs, like Final Fantasy XI, The Lord of the Rings Online: Shadows of Angmar, and The Elder Scrolls Online, remain the most popular type of MMORPG, with the most popular "pay-to-play" game being World of Warcraft, and the most popular "free-to-play" games including RuneScape and TERA, yet other types of MMORPGs are appearing. Sci-fi MMORPGs like Phantasy Star Online and Star Wars: The Old Republic hold a smaller part of the market, with the popular space sci-fi game EVE Online being the most notable. Other massively multiplayer online games which do not have a conventional RPG setting include Second Life and Ingress.

=== Roguelikes ===
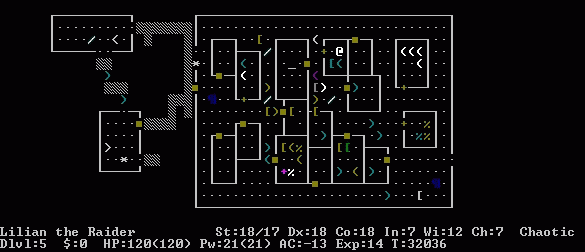
NetHack is a roguelike game. The text display seen here is common in games in the roguelike genre.

The roguelike video game subgenre borrows its name and gameplay elements from the 1980 computer game Rogue. Superficially, a roguelike is a two-dimensional dungeon crawl with a high degree of randomness via procedural generation, an emphasis on statistical character development, and the use of permadeath. Though traditionally featuring a text user interface, many such games utilize graphic tiles to overcome character set limitations. Newer games that move away from traditional hack-and-slash elements but otherwise keeping procedural generation and permadeath features are sometimes called "rogue-lites".

=== Tactical RPG ===
The tactical role-playing game subgenre principally refers to games which incorporate gameplay from strategy games as an alternative to traditional RPG systems. Like standard RPG, the player controls a finite party and battles a similar number of enemies, but this genre incorporates strategic gameplay such as tactical movement on an isometric grid. The genre has its origins in tabletop role-playing games, where each player has time to decide his or her characters' actions.

=== Sandbox RPG ===
The sandbox role-playing game subgenre, also known as the open world role-playing game subgenre, allows the player a large amount of freedom and usually contain a somewhat more open free-roaming, meaning that the player is not confined to a single path restricted by rocks or fences etc. world. Sandbox RPGs contain similarities to other sandbox games such as the Grand Theft Auto series, with a large number of interactable non-player characters, large amount of content and typically some of the largest worlds to explore and longest playtimes of all RPG subgenres due to an impressive amount of secondary content not critical to the game's main storyline.

Sandbox RPGs often attempt to emulate an entire region of their setting. Popular examples of this subgenre include the Dragon Slayer series by Nihon Falcom, the early Dragon Quest games by Chunsoft, Wasteland by Interplay Entertainment, the SaGa and Mana series by Squaresoft, System Shock 2 by Irrational Games and Looking Glass Studios, Deus Ex by Ion Storm, The Elder Scrolls and Fallout series by Bethesda Softworks and Interplay Entertainment, Fable by Lionhead Studios, the Gothic series by Piranha Bytes, and the Xenoblade series by Monolith Soft.

=== First-person party-based RPG ===
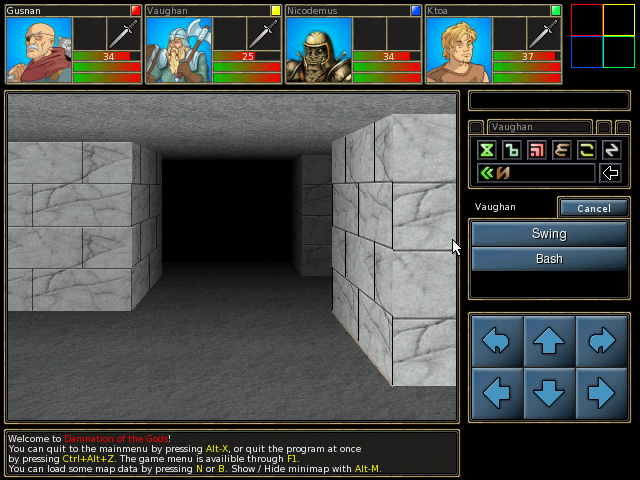
Screenshot of Damnation of Gods, a Dungeon Master clone. All four members of the players's party move around the game world as a single unit in first-person perspective.

Also known as DRPG (Dungeon RPG), this subgenre consists of RPGs where the player leads a party of adventurers in first-person perspective through a dungeon or labyrinth, typically in a grid-based environment. Examples include the aforementioned Wizardry, Might and Magic and Bard's Tale series, as well as the Etrian Odyssey and Elminage series. Games of this type are also known as "blobbers", since the player moves the entire party around the playing field as a single unit, or "blob".

Most "blobbers" are turn-based, but some titles such as the Dungeon Master, Legend of Grimrock, and Eye of the Beholder series are played in real-time. Early games in this genre lack an automap feature, forcing players to draw their own maps in order to keep track of their progress. Environmental and spatial puzzles are common, meaning players may have to, for instance, move a stone in one part of the level in order to open a gate in another part of the level.

=== Monster-taming ===
A variant of the RPG formula where the player recruits monsters to fight for or alongside them. Collected creatures can often be raised or bred to create stronger monsters or to increase their abilities in battle. An example of a monster tamer game is Pokémon.

== Simulation ==
Simulation video games is a diverse super-category of games, generally designed to closely simulate aspects of a real or fictional reality.

=== Construction and management simulation ===
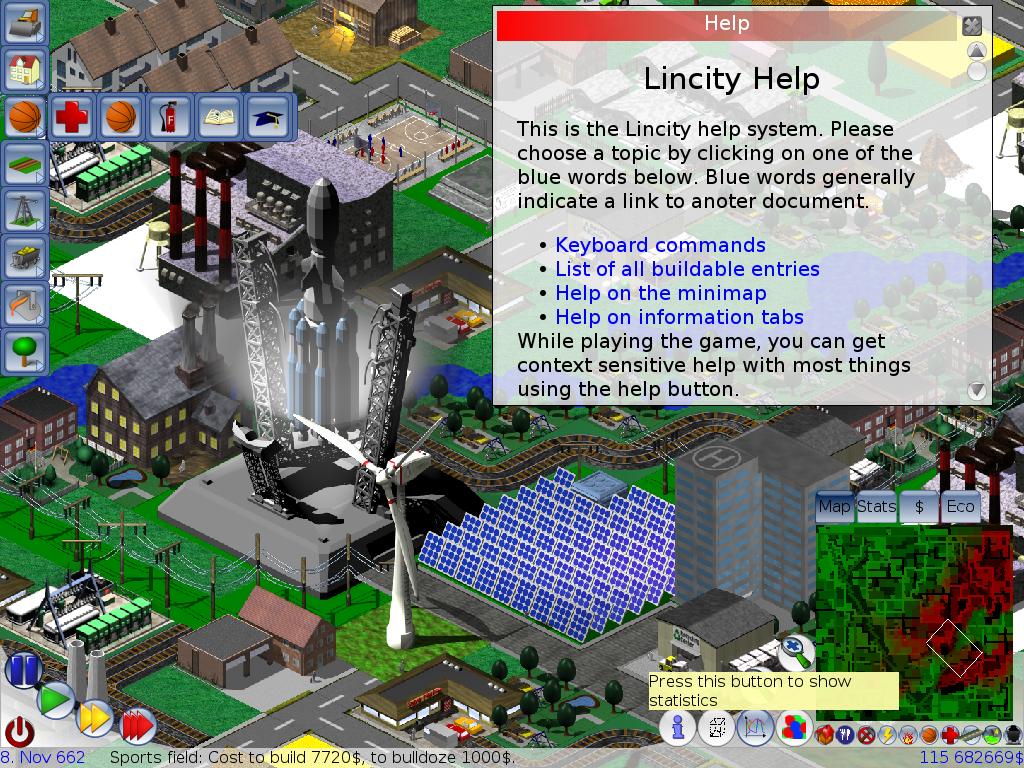
A sample city from Lincity NG

Construction and management simulations, or CMS, are a type of simulation game which task players to build, expand or manage fictional communities or projects with limited resources.

In city-building games the player acts as overall planner or leader to meet the needs and wants of game characters by initiating structures for food, shelter, health, spiritual care, economic growth, etc. Success is achieved when the city budget makes a growing profit and citizens experience an upgraded lifestyle in housing, health, and goods. While military development is often included, the emphasis is on economic strength. Perhaps the most known game of this type is SimCity, which has had great influence on later city-building games like Cities: Skylines. SimCity also belongs to the God Games genre, since it gives the player god-like abilities in manipulating the world. Caesar was a long-running series in this genre, with the original game spawning three sequels.

Business simulation games generally attempt to simulate an economy or business, with the player controlling the economy of the game.

A government simulation game, or "political game", involves the simulation of the policies, government or politics of a country, but typically excludes warfare. Recently, these types of games have gained the moniker "serious game".

=== Life simulation ===
Life simulation games, or artificial life games, involve living or controlling one or more artificial lives. A life simulation game can revolve around individuals and relationships, or it could be a simulation of an ecosystem.

Biological simulations may allow the player to experiment with genetics, survival or ecosystems, often in the form of an educational package. An early example is SimLife, while relatively recent ones are Jurassic Park: Operation Genesis and Spore. In other educational simulations such as Wolf, the player "lives the life" of an individual animal in a relatively realistic way. Hailed as one of the greatest life simulation games, is Creatures, Creatures 2, Creatures 3, where the player breeds generations of a species in a hugely detailed ecosystem.

Unlike other genres of games, god games often do not have a set goal that allows a player to win the game. The focus of a god game tends to be control over the lives of people, anywhere from micromanaging a family to overseeing the rise of a civilization.

Pet-raising simulations, or digital pets, focus more on the relationship between the player and one or few life forms. They are often more limited in scope than other biological simulations. This includes popular examples of virtual pets such as Tamagotchi and the Petz series.

Social simulation games base their gameplay on the social interaction between multiple artificial lives. The most famous example from this genre is Will Wright's The Sims. Dating sims and romance simulation games fall under this category.

Raising simulation games focus on nurturing and developing a character over time. Examples include Princess Maker, Monster Rancher, and Umamusume: Pretty Derby.

=== Vehicle simulation ===
Vehicle simulation games are a genre of video games which attempt to provide the player with a realistic interpretation of operating various kinds of vehicles.

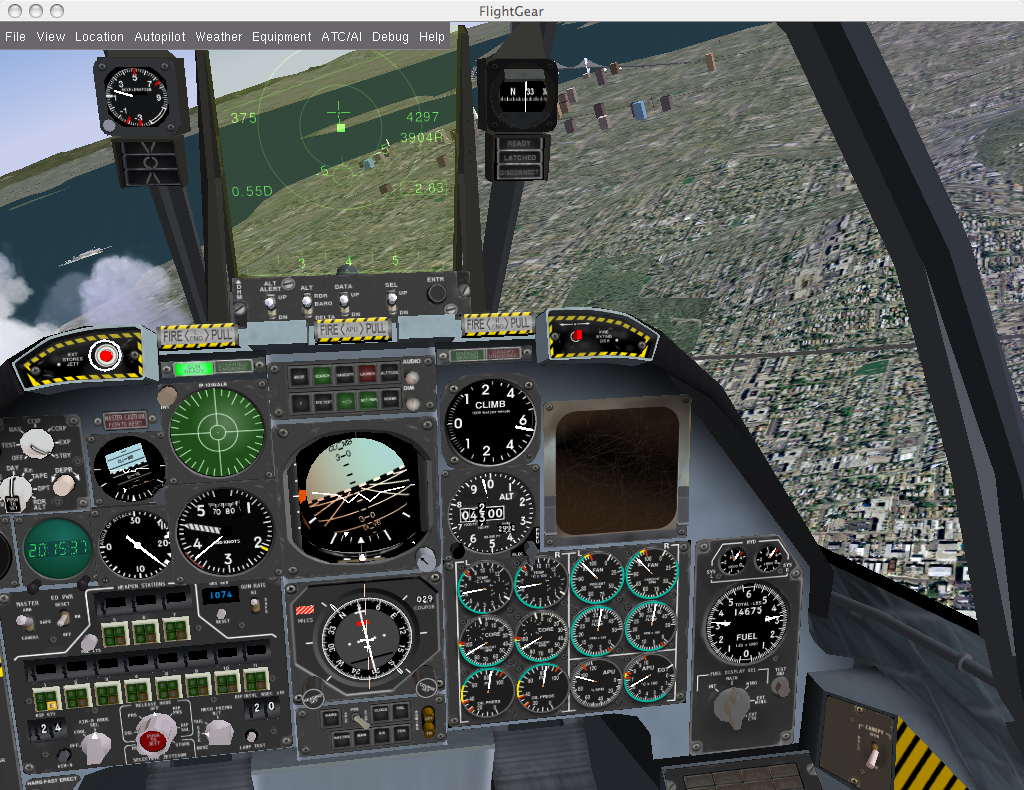
FlightGear is a flight simulation game.

Flight simulation tasks the player with flying an aircraft, usually an airplane, as realistically as possible. Combat flight simulators are the most popular subgenre of simulation. The player controls the plane, simulating the act of flying, and combat situations. There are also civilian flight simulators that do not have the combat aspect.

Racing games typically place the player in the driver's seat of a high-performance vehicle and require the player to race against other drivers or sometimes just the clock. This genre of games is one of the staples of the computer gaming world and many of the earliest computer games created were part of this genre. Emerging in the late 1970s, this genre is still very popular today and continues to push the envelope in terms of graphics and performance. These games "tend to fall into organized racing and imaginary racing categories".

Organized racing simulators attempt to "reproduce the experience of driving a racing car or motorcycle in an existing racing class: IndyCar, NASCAR, Formula One, and so on." Imaginary racing games involve "imaginary situations, driving madly through cities or the countryside or even fantasy environments". These "imaginary" racing games are sometimes called arcade racing games, in contrast to their more realistic "racing simulation" counterparts. These include Need For Speed, Crash Team Racing and Gran Turismo. Rollings and Adams note that "racing games are often sold in the sports category," but "from a design standpoint, they really belong in ... vehicle simulations".

Space flight simulator games are a subgenre that involve piloting a spacecraft. Space simulators are different from other subgenres, and are not generally considered to be simulators, as their simulated objects do not always exist and often disregard the laws of physics, with exceptions like Orbiter and Kerbal Space Program.

Train simulators simulate the vehicles, environments and often economics associated with railway transport. These are frequently historical in nature, reminiscing on the evolution and emergence of the railroad in various countries and the economic booms that often accompanied them.

Vehicular combat or car combat games focus on fast-paced action, as the player operates a car or other vehicle and attempts to disable or destroy AI or human opponents. Vehicular combat games often allow a player to choose from a variety of potential vehicles, each with their own strengths and weaknesses. Vehicular combat was born out of racing/shooter combinations like Spy Hunter, RoadBlasters, and Rock 'N' Roll Racing, but differs in that the players can, if desired, take their vehicles off predefined routes and do battle wherever they please. A subgenre of vehicular combat is Mecha combat, where vehicles generally include giant robot-like tanks.

== Strategy ==
Strategy video games focus on gameplay requiring careful and skillful thinking and planning in order to achieve victory and the action scales from world domination to squad-based tactics. "In most strategy video games," says Andrew Rollings, "the player is given a godlike view of the game world, indirectly controlling the units under his command". Rollings notes that "The origin of strategy games is rooted in their close cousins, board games."

Strategy video games generally take one of four archetypal forms, depending on whether the game is turn-based or real-time and whether the game's focus is upon strategy or tactics. Real time strategy games are often a multiple unit selection game. Multiple game characters can be selected at once to perform different tasks, as opposed to only selecting one character at a time, with a sky view, looking down from above. Some recent games such as Tom Clancy's EndWar, are single unit selection and third person view. Like many RPG games, many strategy games are gradually moving away from turn-based systems, to more real-time systems.

=== 4X game ===
4X refers to a genre of strategy video game with four primary goals: eXplore, eXpand, eXploit, and eXterminate. A 4X game can be turn-based or real-time. Perhaps the best known example of this genre is Sid Meier's Civilization series. 4X games often cover a very large period of time, giving the player the control of an entire civilization or species. Typically these games have a historical setting, encompassing a large amount of human history (Civilization, Empire Earth) or a science fiction setting where the player controls a species set to dominate the galaxy (Master of Orion, Galactic Civilizations).

=== Artillery game ===
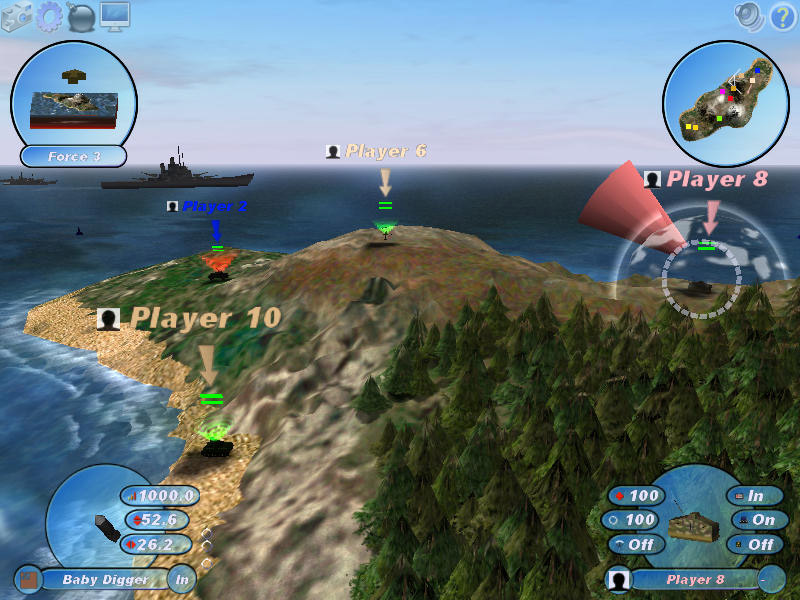
Scorched 3D is an artillery game.

Artillery is the generic name for early two or three-player, usually turn-based, computer games involving tanks fighting each other in combat or similar derivative games. Artillery games were among the earliest computer games developed and can be considered an extension of the original use of computers, which were once used for military-based calculations such as plotting the trajectories of rockets. Artillery games are considered a type of turn-based tactics game. They have also been described as a type of "shooting game". Examples of this genre are Pocket Tanks, Hogs of War, Scorched 3D and the Worms series.

=== Auto battler (Auto chess) ===
Auto battler, also known as "auto chess", is a type of strategy game that features chess-like elements where players place characters on a grid-shaped battlefield during a preparation phase, who then fight the opposing team's characters without any further direct input from the player. It was created and popularized by Dota Auto Chess in early 2019, and saw more games in the genre by other studios, such as Teamfight Tactics, Dota Underlords, and Hearthstone Battlegrounds releasing soon after.

=== Multiplayer online battle arena (MOBA) ===
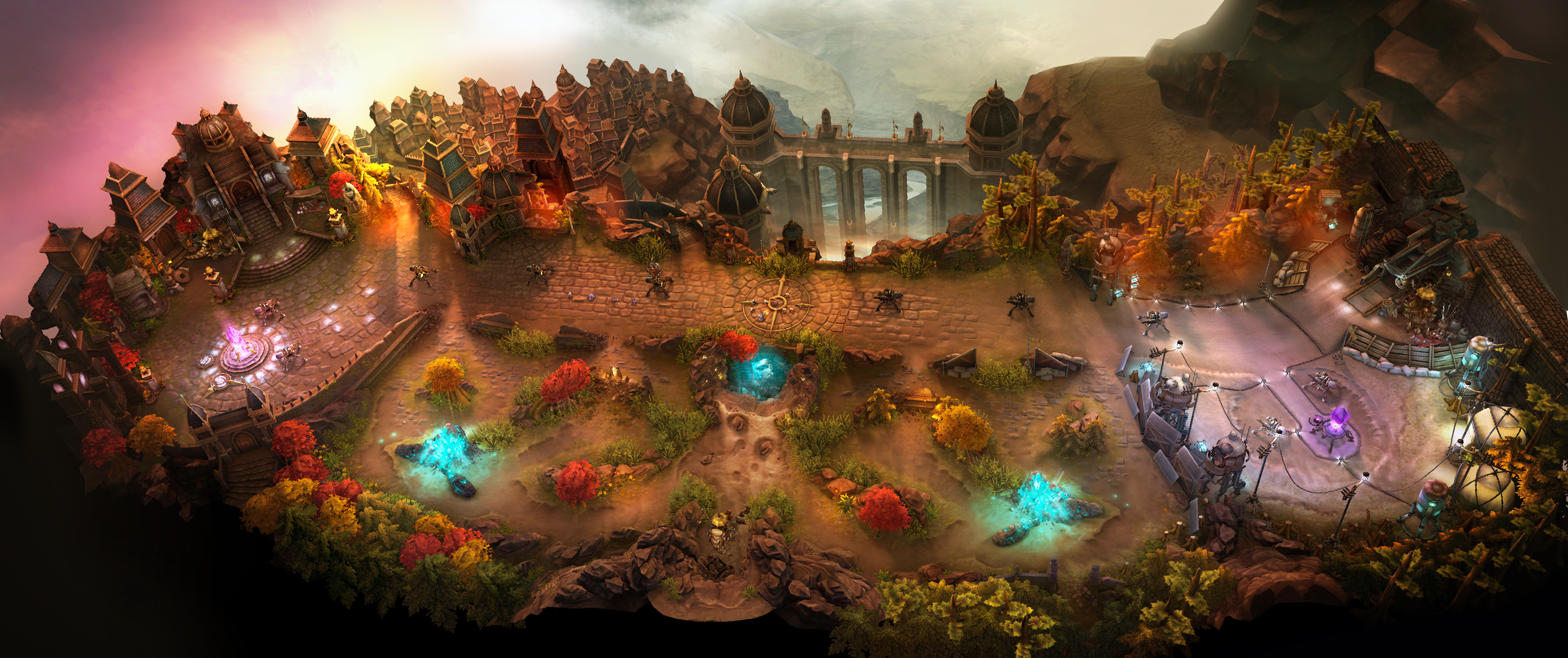
Vainglory is a multiplayer online battle arena game designed for smartphones and tablets.

Multiplayer online battle arena (MOBA) is a genre of strategy video games where two teams of players compete to destroy the opposing team's main structure while defending their own. Players control characters called "heroes" or "champions" with unique abilities, and are aided by computer-controlled units that march along set paths (called "lanes") toward the enemy base. The first team to destroy the enemy's base wins. MOBA games combine elements of real-time strategy, role-playing, and action games, focusing on team coordination, character progression, and fast-paced combat. Unlike traditional real-time strategy games, players do not build structures or units.

The genre gained popularity in the early 2010s, with Defense of the Ancients mod for Warcraft III, League of Legends, Dota 2, Heroes of the Storm, and Smite. MOBA games are well-represented in esports, with prize pools reaching tens of millions of dollars.

=== Real-time strategy (RTS) ===
The moniker "real-time strategy" (RTS), indicates that the action in the game is continuous, and players will have to make their decisions and actions within the backdrop of a constantly changing game state. This genre is probably the most well known of strategy games, and is what most websites mean when they say "strategy games". Real-time strategy gameplay is characterised by obtaining resources, building bases, researching technologies and producing units. Blizzard Entertainment's StarCraft is a popular RTS played competitively in South Korea and televised to large audiences. Other notable games include the Warcraft series, Age of Empires series, SpellForce series, Company of Heroes, Command and Conquer, Dawn of War, and Dune II, essentially the first RTS game. Outside of PCs, very few strategy games are real-time. A few examples are Battle for Middle-earth II, Pikmin, and Halo Wars. Even fewer ones use physical pieces, such as Icehouse.

=== Real-time tactics (RTT) ===
Real-time tactics, abbreviated RTT and less commonly referred to as "fixed-unit real-time strategy", is a subgenre of tactical wargames played in real-time, simulating the considerations and circumstances of operational warfare and military tactics. It is sometimes considered a subgenre of real-time strategy, and may in this context exist as an element of gameplay or as a basis for the whole game. It is differentiated from real-time strategy gameplay by the lack of resource micromanagement and base or unit building, as well as the greater importance of individual units and a focus on complex battlefield tactics. Example titles include Warhammer: Dark Omen, World In Conflict, the Close Combat series, and early tactical role-playing games such as Bokosuka Wars, Silver Ghost, and First Queen.

=== Tower defense ===
Tower defense games have a very simple layout. Usually, computer-controlled monsters move along a set path, and the player must place, or "build" towers along this path to kill the enemies. In some games, towers are placed along a set path for the enemies, while in others, towers can interrupt enemy movement and change their path. In most tower defense games, different towers have different abilities such as poisoning enemies or slowing them down. The player is awarded money for killing enemies which then can be used to buy more towers or tower upgrades such as increasing power or range. Examples include Plants vs. Zombies, Kingdom Rush, and Bloons Tower Defense.

=== Turn-based strategy (TBS) ===
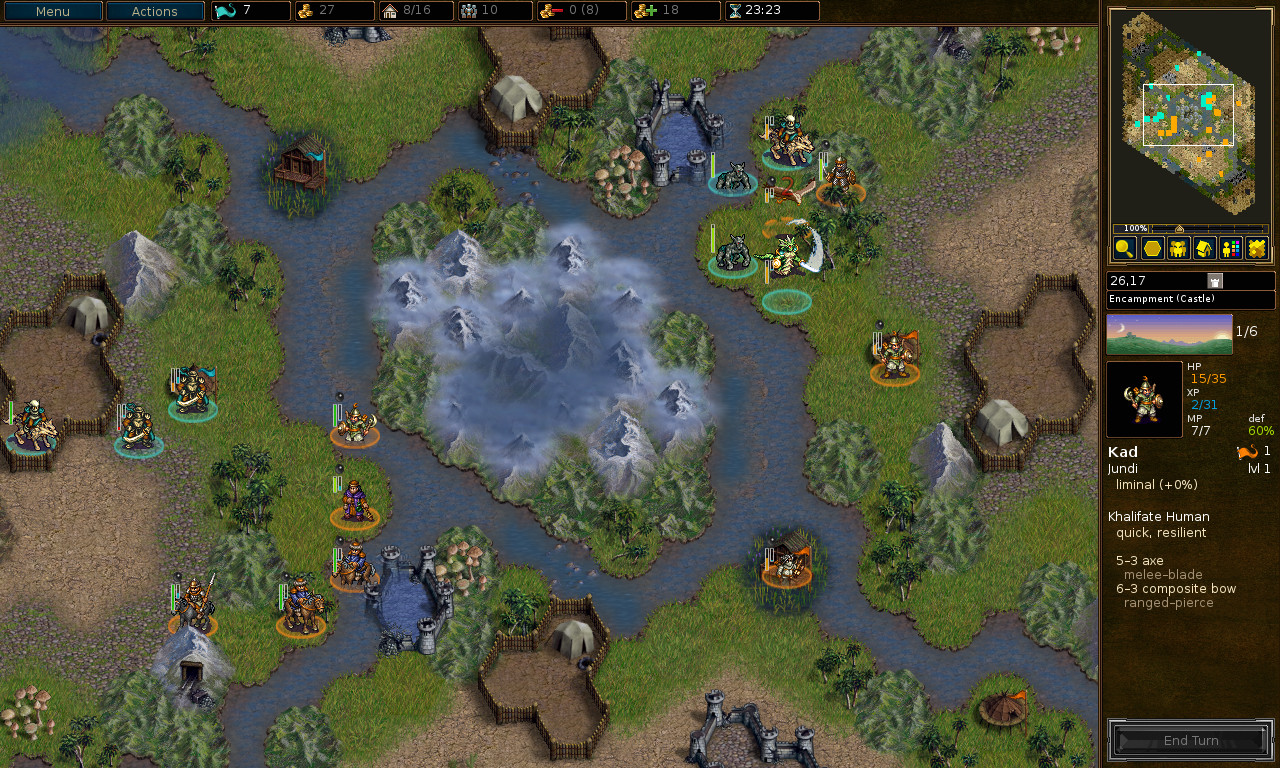
The Battle for Wesnoth is a turn-based strategy game.

The term turn-based strategy (TBS) is usually reserved for certain computer strategy games to distinguish them from real-time strategy games. A player of a turn-based game is allowed a period of analysis before committing to a game action. Some games allow a certain number of moves or actions to take place in a turn. Like real-time strategy games, this genre can include many strategy games which are not solely turn-based games and games which may contain other features not related to whether the game is turn-based or not. Examples of this genre are Civilization, Heroes of Might and Magic, Making History, and Master of Orion. The 'Warhammer' franchise has some notable turn-based strategy games, such as 'Warhammer 40K: Battlesector'.

Some recent turn-based strategy games features a different gameplay mechanic, that being a simultaneous resolution of the turns. Every player prepares their future actions in the planning phase and then lets the game follow the orders given at the same time. This causes orders to be interrupted by the opponents actions, changing the gameplay from reacting to the opponent's action, into guessing them.

=== Turn-based tactics (TBT) ===
The gameplay of turn-based tactics games (TBT) is characterized by the expectation of players to complete their tasks using the combat forces provided to them usually by the provision of a realistic (or at least believable) representation of military tactics and operations. Examples of this genre include the Wars, Jagged Alliance and X-COM series, as well as tactical role-playing games such as the Fire Emblem and Final Fantasy Tactics.

=== Wargame ===
Wargames are a subgenre of strategy video games that emphasize strategic or tactical warfare on a map. Wargames generally take one of four archetypal forms, depending on whether the game is turn-based or real-time, and whether the game's focus is upon military strategy or tactics.

=== Grand strategy wargame ===
A grand strategy wargame is a wargame that places focus on grand strategy- military strategy at the level of movement and use of an entire nation state or empire's resources. An example of this subgenre is the Hearts of Iron franchise.

== Sports ==
Sports games simulate the rules and gameplay of real life sports to varying degrees of accuracy. The opposing team(s) can be controlled by other players or by artificial intelligence.

=== Racing ===
Racing games involve characters competing in races (typically with vehicles, although games like Sonic R and Mad Dash Racing focus on foot racing). Racing games have multiple subgenres, such as kart racers (which tend to involve go-karts, power-up items and are usually themed around popular media franchises, such as Mario Kart), arcade racers (featuring a fast-paced experience and far more liberal physics, most Need for Speed games serving as an example), and sim racers (which attempt to accurately simulate the operation of real motor vehicles, such as Gran Turismo and Forza Motorsport).

=== Sports game ===
Sports games emulate the playing of traditional physical sports. While most sports games have players control the competitors directly, others simulate the coaching and management of teams, such as Championship Manager. Others satirize the sport for comedic effect, such as Arch Rivals. Some sports games are not based on real-life sports, but instead a fictional sport made for the purposes of the game, such as Rocket League and Speedball. One of the best selling series in this genre is the FIFA series. This genre emerged early in the history of video games (with Pong being a notable example).

== MMO ==
A massively multiplayer online game, also called MMO or MMOG, is a multiplayer online video game which is capable of supporting large amounts of players simultaneously. Many games have at least one persistent world while others have large numbers of players competing at once, in one form or another, without any lasting effect to the world. These games can usually be found via network-capable platforms, including the personal computer, video game console, or smartphones and other mobile devices. An example is the widely played game Minecraft which can be played both as an MMO or a single player game.

MMO games can enable players to cooperate and compete with each other on a large scale, and sometimes to interact meaningfully with people around the world. They include a variety of gameplay types, representing many video game genres such as MMORPG, MMOFPS, MMORTS, MMOTBS and MMO simulation games.

== Other notable genres ==
=== Board game or card game ===
Many popular board games and card games have computer versions. AI opponents can help improve one's skill at traditional games. Chess, Checkers, Othello (also known as Reversi), and Backgammon have world class computer programs. Mahjong and related games are immensely popular in China and Japan. Go is popular in East Asia, though it is notoriously difficult to program a computer to play Go well.

=== Casino game ===
There are three general categories of casino games: gaming machines, table games, and random number games. Gaming machines, such as the slot machine and pachinko, are usually played by one player at a time and do not require the involvement of players to play. Tables games, such as blackjack or craps, involve one or more players who are competing against the house, the casino itself, rather than each other. Random number games may be played at a table or through the purchase of paper tickets or cards, such as keno or bingo.

=== Digital collectible card game ===
A digital collectible card game (DCCG) is a computer or video game usually played online that emulates collectible card games (CCG), or in many cases, doesn't use any card-like images, but instead uses icons, avatars or other symbols to represent game pieces. Originally, DCCGs started out as replications of a CCG's physical counterpart such as Magic: The Gathering, but many DCCGs have foregone a physical version and exclusively release as a video game, such as with Hearthstone.

=== Digital therapeutic video game ===
A digital therapeutic video game is a digital treatment for a cognitive impairment, such as ADHD, delivered through the experience of a video game. These video games create immersive engagement that activates the brain networks selectively in order to improve cognitive function over time. Games like EndeavorRx and EndeavorOTC present specific sensory stimuli and simultaneous motor challenges to the user or patient in order to target neural systems in the brain related to paying attention and sustaining focus. The efficacy of these treatments have been rigorously evaluated across multiple clinical studies for those diagnosed with ADHD, validating the benefit to users.

=== Gacha game ===
Gacha games are video games that implement the gacha (toy vending machine) mechanic. Similar to loot boxes, gacha games induce players to spend in-game currency to receive a random virtual item. Most of these games are free-to-play mobile games, where the gacha serves as an incentive to spend real-world money.

=== Horror game ===
Horror games are games that incorporate elements of horror fiction into their narrative, generally irrespective of the type of gameplay. It is one of the few major video game categories that are recognized by narrative elements rather than by gameplay, gameplay mode, or platform. Survival horror is a subgenre of horror games focused on an action-adventure style of gameplay.

=== Idle game ===
In an IGN article, Cookie Clicker is credited as one of the few games to have played a major role in the establishment of the genre of idle gaming.

This genre involves games that orient the player with a trivial task, such as clicking a cookie; and as the game progresses, the player is gradually rewarded certain upgrades for completing said task. These games generally require very little involvement from the player, and in most cases, play themselves; hence the use of the word "idle".

In early 2014, Orteil released an early version of Idle Game Maker, a tool allowing customized idle games to be made without coding knowledge.

=== Party game ===
Party games are video games developed specifically for multiplayer games between many players. Normally, party games have a variety of mini-games that range between collecting more of a certain item than other players or having the fastest time at something. Such games include the Mario Party series, Crash Bash, and Rayman Raving Rabbids. Versus multiplayer games are not generally considered to be party games.

=== Photography game ===
A photography game tasks players with taking photos using the in-game camera system, typically awarding more points for better composed images. Photography mechanics are often implemented as sidequests in games in other genres, but there are some games where photography is the main gameplay mode. These include Pokémon Snap, Afrika and the Fatal Frame series.

=== Social deduction game ===
A social deduction game is a game in which players attempt to uncover each other's hidden role or team allegiance. During gameplay, players can use logic and deductive reasoning to try to deduce one another's roles, while other players can bluff to keep players from suspecting them. A notable example of a social deduction video game is Among Us, which received a massive influx of popularity in 2020 due to many well-known Twitch streamers and YouTubers playing it.

=== Trivia game ===
Trivia games are growing in popularity, especially on mobile phones where people may only have a few minutes to play the game. In trivia games, the object is to answer questions with the goal of obtaining points. Some are based on real-life trivia game shows such as Are You Smarter than a 5th Grader? or Family Feud.

=== Typing game ===
A typing game is any game that uses typing as the main method of interaction. While they initially started as a type of educational game, they later became more entertainment focused as indie developers explored possibilities within the genre.

== Video game genres by purpose ==
While most video games are designed as entertainment, many video games are designed with additional purposes. These purposes are as varied as the nature of information itself—to inform, persuade, or stimulate. These games can have any kind of gameplay, from puzzles to action to adventure.

=== Advergame ===
Advergames, in the context of video game genres, refers to promotional software specifically made to advertise a product, organization or viewpoint. The first advergames were distributed on floppy disk by the Chef Boyardee, Coca-Cola, and Samsung brands, while the first cereal box advergame was Chex Quest in 1996. The majority of advergames are found online and mostly include simple and cheaply made Flash games. Some advergames were released to consoles, like Pepsiman for Sony PlayStation.

=== Art game ===
Art games are designed so as to emphasize art or whose structures are intended to produce some kind of non-ludological reaction in its audience. Art games typically go out of their way to have a unique, unconventional look, often standing out for aesthetic beauty or complexity in design. This concept extends to the realm of modified ("modded") gaming when modifications have been made to existing non-art-games to produce graphic results intended to be viewed as an artistic display, as opposed to modifications intended to change game play scenarios or for storytelling. Modified games created for artistic purposes are sometimes referred to as "videogame art."

=== Casual game ===
Casual games are designed to be easily picked up and put down again with relatively low time commitment, allowing for potentially short bursts of play. Because this genre of gaming is meant to be a short and relaxing pastime and a rest in between other occupations, it is most popular with demographics who have less free time. They usually have very simple rules or play techniques and a very low degree of strategy. They have no lengthy tutorials and require no special skills, making them easy to learn and play as a pastime.

Retaining players involves carefully designing levels, challenges, and events. Market leaders in this genre are often boldly colored, designed for intuitive interaction, and hold a high balance of reward to time in order to keep players returning to the game. Designers of these games frequently add "juice" (sound and motion elements that excite the senses) to make them stand out in a sea of highly similar games.

Casual games are typically played in web browsers or on mobile devices; however, they are starting to become more popular on game consoles. They often have auto-saving and syncing so the games can be minimized, put into sleep, or otherwise put down with no loss to the player. There are comparatively low production and distribution costs for the producer.

=== Christian game ===
Christian games attempt to provide the dual purposes of spreading the Christian religion to non-believers through the medium of video games, and providing gamers who identify as Christian with a common pool of games. Christian video games were first developed by Wisdom Tree for the NES, without license. While largely regarded as derivative titles by the mainstream gaming culture, Christian games have nevertheless expanded in distribution since their inception.

=== Educational game ===
Educational games, as the name implies, attempts to teach the user. Most of these types of games target young users from the ages of three years old to mid-teens; past the mid-teens, subjects become so complex (e.g. Calculus) that teaching via a video game is generally impractical, though exceptions do exist in some areas, such as programming. Numerous sub-genres exist in fields such as math or typing.

=== Esports ===
Esports games are multiplayer games that are usually played competitively at the professional level. These games are often targeted at the "hardcore" gaming audience and are usually first-person shooter games, requiring twitch-based reaction speed and coordination, or real-time strategy games, requiring high levels of strategic macro- and/or micromanagement, or MOBAs, which require both.

=== Exergame (Fitness Game) ===
An exergame (portmanteau of "exercise" and "game") is a video game that provides exercise. "Exergames" sub-divide into two main implementations, those with a game specifically designed to use an exercise input device (for example, the game Wii Fit using the Wii Balance Board) and those implementations using a genre of a game. Games fit into the category of entertainment, and similarly "exergames" are a category of "exertainment" (formed from "exercise" and "entertainment"). "Exertainment" refers to one aspect of adding entertainment to an exercise workout.

=== Personalized game ===
Personalized games are created for one specific player or a group of players usually as a gift. They are hand-made to feature real names, places and events from the recipient's life. Usual occasions for such games are birthdays, anniversaries, and engagement proposals.

=== Serious game ===
Serious games are intended to educate or train the player. These games tend to promote "education, science, social change, health care or even the military". Some of these games have no specific ending or goal in the game. Rather, the player learns a real life lesson from the game. For example, games from websites such as Newsgaming.com and gamesforchange.org raise political issues using the distinct properties of games.

=== Live Interactive Game ===
Live interactive games, also known as bullet screen interactive game, are a genre of games built on live streaming platforms. During a live broadcast, the host initiates the game, and viewers can participate by forming teams, giving likes, sending gifts, and posting comments. The barrage mechanism translates these signals into in-game resources or effects, transforming the live broadcast from a one-to-many format to a space where viewers can also interact with each other.

== Sandbox / open world games ==
Sandbox and open-world games are not specifically video game genres, as they generally describe gameplay features, but often games will be described as a sandbox or an open-world game as if it were a defining genre. They are included here for such distinguishing purposes.

=== Sandbox ===
A sandbox game is a video game with a gameplay element that gives the player a great degree of creativity to complete tasks towards a goal within the game, if such a goal exists. Some games exist as pure sandbox games with no objectives; these are also known as non-games or software toys. More commonly, sandbox games results from these creative elements being incorporated into other genres and allowing for emergent gameplay. Sandbox games are often associated with open world concepts which gives the player freedom of movement and progression in the game's world. The "sandbox" term derives from the nature of a sandbox that lets children create nearly anything they want within it.

Early sandbox games came out of space trading and combat games like Elite (1984) and city-building simulations and tycoon games like SimCity (1989). The releases of The Sims and Grand Theft Auto III in 2000 and 2001, respectively, demonstrated that games with highly detailed interacting systems that encouraged player experimentation could also be seen as sandbox games. Sandbox games also found ground with the ability to interact socially and share user-generated content across the Internet like Second Life (2003). Minecraft (2011) is the most successful example of a sandbox game, with players able to enjoy in both creative modes and through more goal-driven survival modes.

=== Creative ===
Creative games are games that are often grounded into other genres but have certain modes of gameplay that allow for a Sandbox and/or Openworld Gameplay, It is extremely common for a "Creative" Game mode to use the same aspects, assets, mechanics, etc. of the Parent Game. However, this isn't always the case as some games have used assets unavailable in the normal Game. Story/Narrative is often removed or non-existent in these modes. However, while generally rare, creative modes have been seen to have an independent story from the main game or even be an entirely independent game.

=== Open world ===
In video games, an open world is a game mechanic of using a virtual world that the player can explore and approach objectives freely, as opposed to a world with more linear and structured gameplay. While games have used open-world designs since the 1980s, the implementation in Grand Theft Auto III (2001) set a standard that has been used since.

Games with open or free-roaming worlds typically lack level structures like walls and locked doors, or the invisible walls in more open areas that prevent the player from venturing beyond them; only at the bounds of an open-world game will players be limited by geographic features like vast oceans or impassible mountains. Players typically do not encounter loading screens common in linear level designs when moving about the game world, with the open-world game using strategic storage and memory techniques to load the game world in a dynamic and seamless manner. Open-world games still enforce many restrictions in the game environment, either because of absolute technical limitations or in-game limitations imposed by a game's linearity.

While the openness of the game world is an important facet to games featuring open worlds, the main draw of open-world games is about providing the player with autonomy – not so much the freedom to do anything they want in the game, which is nearly impossible with current computing technology, but the ability to choose how to approach the game and its challenges in the order and manner as the player desires while still constrained by gameplay rules.

Examples of high level of autonomy in computer games can be found in massively multiplayer online role-playing games (MMORPG) or in single-player games adhering to the open-world concept such as the Fallout series. The main appeal of open-world gameplay is that they provide a simulated reality and allow players to develop their character and its behaviour in the direction and the pace of their own choosing. In these cases, there is often no concrete goal or end to the game, although there may be the main storyline, such as with games like The Elder Scrolls V: Skyrim.

== Scientific studies ==
As video games are increasingly the subject of scientific studies, game genres are themselves becoming a subject of study.

An early attempt at analysis of the action and adventure genres appeared in a Game Developers Conference 2000 paper 'Mostly Armless: Grabbing the 3D World'. This critiqued a variety of adventure and action games to categorize gameplay and interaction for adventure, action, and hybrid genres. It provided a graph of the genres along the axes of 'immediacy' vs 'complexity', with an 'ideal-zone' for gameplay that covered and linked adventure and action games. It detailed various interaction styles present in these genres and extrapolated to future user interface and gameplay possibilities for these and other genres. Some of these have since been adopted by persistent worlds. For example, Second Life uses some of the gameplay investment and interface elements described in section 4 of the paper.

In a University of Queensland study, game enjoyment was correlated with attributes such as immersion, social interaction, and the nature of the goals. These may be underlying factors in differentiating game genres.

Statistical scaling techniques were used in a study presented at the 2007 Siggraph Video Game Symposium to convert subject ratings of game similarity into visual maps of game genres. The maps reproduced some of the commonly identified genres such as first-person shooters and god games. A Michigan State University study found that men have a higher preference for genres that require competition and three-dimensional navigation and manipulation than women do.

== See also ==
=== Game interfaces ===
- Audio game
- Browser game
- Text-based game
- Tile-based video games
- Side-scrolling video game

=== Game platforms ===
- Arcade game
- Console game
- Handheld video game
- Massively multiplayer online game
- Mobile game
- Online game
- Personal computer game

=== Other related topics ===
- Game classification
- List of types of games
- List of gaming topics
- Nonviolent video game
- Non-game
- Video game
- Asymmetry

== Bibliography ==
- Adams, Ernest (2013). Fundamentals of Game Design (3rd ed.). San Francisco: New Riders. ISBN 978-0-321-92967-9.
- Adams, Ernest (2014). Fundamentals of Action and Arcade Game Design. San Francisco: New Riders. ISBN 978-0-13-381130-8.
- Adams, Ernest (2015). Fundamentals of Shooter Game Design. San Francisco: New Riders. ISBN 978-0-13-381094-3.
- Wolf, Mark, J. P. (2012). Encyclopedia of video games : the culture, technology, and art of gaming. Vol. 1. Santa Barbara, California: ABC-CLIO. ISBN 978-0313379369.
- Rogers, Scott (2014). Level Up! The Guide to Great Video Game Design (2nd ed.). Chichester, England: John Wiley & Sons. ISBN 978-1-118-87716-6.
- Call, Joshua; Whitlock, Katie; Voorhees, Gerald A. (2012). Guns, Grenades, and Grunts: First-Person Shooter Games. London: Bloomsbury Publishing. ISBN 9781441193537.
- Barton, Matt; Loguidice, Bill (2009). Vintage Games. Boston: Focal Press. ISBN 978-0-240-81146-8.
