= Sokoban =

Puzzle video game

- Sokoban official fan kit banner
- Genre: Puzzle
- Developers: Thinking Rabbit; ASCII; Itochu; Unbalance; Falcon Other: Atelier Double; Epoch; J Wing; Konami; Media Rings; Micro Cabin; Namco; NCS; Outback; Pack-In-Video; Riverhill Soft; Sega; Soft Office; Spectral Associates; Spectrum HoloByte; Three D
- Publishers: Thinking Rabbit; ASCII; Itochu; Unbalance Other: Chukyo Television; DreamWorks; Dwango; Epoch; FCI; Fujitsu Parex; J Wing; Konami; Masaya; Media Rings; Micro Cabin; Miyagi Television; Namco; NEC; Nintendo; Nippon Television; Oh!Dyna; Pack-In-Video; PC Magazine; Pony Canyon; Riverhill Soft; Sega; Sharp; Skill Information; Spectrum HoloByte; Square Enix; Tandy
- Creator: Hiroyuki Imabayashi
- Platforms: Various: Android; Apple II; Commodore 64; EZweb; Famicom Disk System; FM Towns; Fujitsu FM-7; Game Boy; Game Gear; Game Pocket Computer; IBM PC; i-mode; iOS; Macintosh; MB-S1; MSX; MSX2; Namco System 1; Nintendo Switch; NEC PC-6001mkII; NEC PC-8001mkII; NEC PC-8801; NEC PC-9801; PlayStation; PlayStation 4; Sega Genesis; SG-1000; Sharp MZ-2000; Sharp X1; Sharp X68000; Super Famicom; TurboGrafx-16; Windows
- First release: Sokoban; 1982 (Note: 1982 is the official year, though 1983 is also reported in certain sources; see § History.)
- Latest release: The Sokoban; 2021

Sokoban (倉庫番, Sōko-ban; lit. 'warehouse keeper') is a puzzle video game created in 1981 by Hiroyuki Imabayashi. In Sokoban, the player pushes boxes in a warehouse to get them onto storage locations. The game is viewed from a top-down perspective. Boxes can only be pushed, and only one box can be pushed at a time. The principal challenge is planning moves correctly to avoid causing a deadlock, a situation where a box or the player becomes permanently trapped, making the puzzle unsolvable.

Imabayashi's company, Thinking Rabbit, released the first commercial version in Japan in 1982. Following this debut, Thinking Rabbit and its licensed partners developed a series of new titles until 2000. The game debuted internationally in 1988 with the U.S. release Soko-Ban. Falcon, a Japanese software company, acquired the rights to Sokoban in 2001. Since then, new installments have been published either by Falcon under the Thinking Rabbit brand or by licensed partners.

Over its history, the Sokoban series has sold over 4.1 million copies worldwide, with more than 40 official games released across various platforms. Reviewers have highlighted the game's simplicity, its addictive and challenging nature, and the depth of thought required. Sokoban's core mechanics have been replicated in numerous clones, and the game has inspired thousands of community-created levels. The Sokoban puzzle concept of pushing boxes to clear a path or move them to targets has also appeared in other video games. Furthermore, Sokoban has been studied in the fields of computational complexity and artificial intelligence.

== Gameplay ==
The puzzles in Sokoban require the player to push boxes to designated spots (shown as red dots in the animation) in the game world.

Sokoban takes place in a warehouse viewed from above and composed of walls and floor squares. A floor square may be empty, occupied by the player, or occupied by a box. Some floor squares are storage locations. The number of storage locations equals the number of boxes. The objective of the puzzle is to push all boxes onto storage locations.

The player can move one square at a time, either horizontally or vertically, onto an empty floor square. Boxes and walls block the player's movement, but the player can walk up to a box and push it to an empty square directly beyond it. If a box is pushed against a wall or another box, it does not move. Pulling boxes is not possible.

Sokoban requires players to plan several moves ahead and consider all possible outcomes. Careless moves could leave a box permanently trapped against a wall or another box, stuck in a dead end, or permanently prevent access to boxes that still need to be moved. Any such situation creates a deadlock that makes the puzzle unsolvable, regardless of future moves, unless the player undoes enough steps.

== History ==
In 1981, Hiroyuki Imabayashi created the Sokoban video game for the NEC PC-8001 as a hobby, featuring text-based graphics and five original levels. He had long been intrigued by the movement of a character pushing luggage in the action game Aldebaran #1 (1980), in which luggage was used as an obstacle; he implemented that movement as a puzzle using BASIC in the spring, envisioning a warehouse setting where incorrect box placement could make further progress difficult or impossible. In the autumn, he completed the design of levels that proved challenging even for his friends. That winter, his wife's parents owned a record store, and there was talk of setting up a small computer section in it. Around the time this came up, a salesman happened to see Sokoban and suggested to Imabayashi that it had commercial potential.

First level of Sokoban for the NEC PC-8801, designed by Hiroyuki Imabayashi.

Imabayashi then began preparing Sokoban for commercial release; using an NEC PC-8801 in the computer section, he decided on the design, enhanced the graphics, and expanded the level count to twenty. He founded Thinking Rabbit to market Sokoban, which became the company's first commercial title. The timeline of these events varies across sources: official records report a 1982 founding and a December 1982 release, while other sources date these events to 1983, placing the company's founding in spring, its debut or incorporation in June, and the game's release in April, May, or June.

In August 1983, the Japanese magazine PC Magazine published Sokoban Extra Edition as a type-in program with ten new levels, developed by Thinking Rabbit at the magazine's request. In 1984, Thinking Rabbit released Sokoban 2, which included fifty new levels and a puzzle editor. Throughout the 1980s, new titles appeared on various Japanese platforms, including home computers such as the MSX and PC-9801, and consoles like the Famicom, Sega SG-1000, Sega Mega Drive, and Game Boy. These releases were developed either by Thinking Rabbit or by other companies under license agreements. Spectrum HoloByte in California licensed Sokoban from Japan's ASCII and adapted the MSX version for IBM PC, Apple II, and Commodore 64, adding features for the U.S. market; it was released as Soko-Ban in early 1988. Falcon, a Japanese software company, trademarked the game's kanji name "倉庫番" in 1988. In 1991, Thinking Rabbit released Sokoban Revenge, which featured 306 levels submitted by users. New titles in the official series were released in Japan throughout the 1990s for platforms including the Super Famicom, Windows, Macintosh, and PlayStation.

Around 2000, Thinking Rabbit became inactive but remained a legal entity. In 2001, Falcon acquired the copyrights for Sokoban, and trademarked the Latin-script name "Sokoban" in 2003 and the name "Thinking Rabbit" in 2011. From 2004 to 2007, Falcon developed several titles for Japanese mobile phones. Between 2015 and 2018, Falcon developed five Sokoban titles for Windows and the smartphone game Sokoban Touch (2016), publishing each under the Thinking Rabbit brand. Falcon bundled four of these Windows titles into the Sokoban Complete Pack (倉庫番 コンプリートパック) (2016) to commemorate the series' 35th anniversary, which was published by Skill Information. Falcon developed three Sokoban titles for Japanese digital terrestrial television broadcasters in 2018. Unbalance developed and published an official title in 2021, The Sokoban, for the Nintendo Switch and PlayStation 4.

== Games ==
Sokoban has a fixed set of gameplay rules; however, certain official releases have expanded the rules or introduced variations on the core mechanics. For example, the first commercial release of the game, Sokoban (倉庫番) (1982–1983), allows certain walls to be broken from level 11 onward. The PlayStation version of Ultimate Sokoban (究極の倉庫番) features a set of levels in which boxes must be stored in an arrangement that completes an electrical circuit. Sokoban Special of Tears (涙の倉庫番スペシャル) and Sokoban Legend: Land of Light and Darkness (倉庫番伝説 光と闇の国) each offer a game mode that follows standard Sokoban rules. Additionally, each offers another mode featuring action-oriented mechanics; in the former title, the mode allows the use of tools such as ropes, whereas in the latter title, the mode requires pushing enemies into holes and puppets onto magic circles. Super Sokoban (Super倉庫番) offers a two-player mode in which players compete to solve the same puzzle. Each player's area is displayed on a different side of the screen, and the areas randomly rotate during the match. The first to finish wins. Conversely, Power Sokoban (Power倉庫番) is an action-puzzle game that deviates from the warehouse keeper mechanic; the player shoots orbs at enemies and pushes boulders into holes.

More than 20 official Sokoban titles have been released across over 30 platforms. The following table lists titles in the Sokoban series; it is not exhaustive.

Title	Release	Platform	Developer	Publisher	Region
Sokoban (倉庫番)	1982–1983	NEC PC-8801; NEC PC-6001mkII; NEC PC-8001mkII; Fujitsu FM-7; Sharp MZ-2000; Sharp X1	Thinking Rabbit	Thinking Rabbit	Japan
Sokoban Extra Edition (倉庫番[番外編])	1983	NEC PC-8801	Thinking Rabbit	PC Magazine	Japan
Sokoban 2 (倉庫番2)	1984	NEC PC-9801; NEC PC-8801; NEC PC-6001mkII; NEC PC-8001mkII; Fujitsu FM-7; Sharp X1; MB-S1	Thinking Rabbit	Thinking Rabbit	Japan
Sokoban (倉庫番) (ROM pack)	1984	MSX	Seiji Nishikawa	ASCII	Japan
Sokoban Toolkit (倉庫番ツールキット) (Tape pack)	1984	MSX	Seiji Nishikawa	ASCII	Japan
Sokoban (倉庫番)	1985	Game Pocket Computer	—	Epoch	Japan
Sokoban (倉庫番)	1985	SG-1000	—	Sega	Japan
Sokoban Special of Tears (涙の倉庫番スペシャル)	1986	Famicom Disk System	Thinking Rabbit	ASCII	Japan
Soko-Ban	1988	IBM PC; Commodore 64; Apple II	Spectrum HoloByte	Spectrum HoloByte^{US} Mirrorsoft^{UK}	North America, Europe
Soko-Ban	1988	TRS-80 Color Computer 2	Spectral Associates	Tandy	North America
Sokoban Perfect (倉庫番Perfect)	1989	NEC PC-9801	Thinking Rabbit	Thinking Rabbit	Japan
Sokoban Perfect (倉庫番Perfect)	1989	NEC PC-8801	Thinking Rabbit	Thinking Rabbit	Japan
Sokoban Perfect (倉庫番Perfect)	1989	Sharp X68000	Thinking Rabbit	Thinking Rabbit	Japan
Sokoban Perfect (倉庫番Perfect)	1989	Sharp X1	Thinking Rabbit	Thinking Rabbit	Japan
Sokoban Perfect (倉庫番Perfect)	1989	MSX2	—	Micro Cabin	Japan
Sokoban (倉庫番); Boxxle^{NA,EU}	1989	Game Boy	Atelier Double	Pony Canyon^{JP} FCI^{NA} FCI France^{EU}	Japan, North America, Europe
Sokoban (倉庫番); Boxxle^{NA,EU}	1990^{NA}	Game Boy	Atelier Double	Pony Canyon^{JP} FCI^{NA} FCI France^{EU}	Japan, North America, Europe
Sokoban (倉庫番); Boxxle^{NA,EU}	1991^{EU}	Game Boy	Atelier Double	Pony Canyon^{JP} FCI^{NA} FCI France^{EU}	Japan, North America, Europe
The Greatest Sokoban in History (史上最大の倉庫番); Shove It! The Warehouse Game^{NA}	1990	Sega Genesis	NCS	Masaya^{JP} DreamWorks^{NA}	Japan, North America
The Greatest Sokoban in History (史上最大の倉庫番); Shove It! The Warehouse Game^{NA}	1990^{NA}	Sega Genesis	NCS	Masaya^{JP} DreamWorks^{NA}	Japan, North America
Sokoban World (倉庫番World); Boxyboy^{NA}	1990	TurboGrafx-16	Media Rings	Media Rings^{JP} NEC^{NA}	Japan, North America
Sokoban World (倉庫番World); Boxyboy^{NA}	1990^{NA}	TurboGrafx-16	Media Rings	Media Rings^{JP} NEC^{NA}	Japan, North America
Sokoban 2 (倉庫番2); Boxxle II^{NA}	1990	Game Boy	Atelier Double	Pony Canyon^{JP} FCI America^{NA}	Japan, North America
Sokoban 2 (倉庫番2); Boxxle II^{NA}	1992^{NA}	Game Boy	Atelier Double	Pony Canyon^{JP} FCI America^{NA}	Japan, North America
Sokoban Deluxe (倉庫番Deluxe)	1990	Namco System 1	—	Namco	Japan
Sokoban (倉庫番)	1990	Game Gear	—	Riverhill Soft	Japan
Sokoban Revenge (倉庫番Revenge)	1991	NEC PC-9801	Thinking Rabbit	Thinking Rabbit	Japan
Sokoban Revenge SX-68K (倉庫番リベンジ SX-68K)	1993	Sharp X68000	Thinking Rabbit	Sharp	Japan
Super Sokoban (Super倉庫番)	1993	Super Famicom	Thinking Rabbit	Pack-In-Video	Japan
Sokoban (倉庫番) (for Windows/for Macintosh)	1995	Windows	Outback	Itochu	Japan
Sokoban (倉庫番) (for Windows/for Macintosh)	1996	Macintosh	Outback	Itochu	Japan
Ultimate Sokoban (究極の倉庫番)	1996	PlayStation	Thinking Rabbit	Itochu	Japan
Ultimate Sokoban (究極の倉庫番)	1998 (Note: Two editions were released. The first was published by Itochu in March, and the second was published by Unbalance as a repackaged edition with no changes to the game program.)	Windows	Outback	Itochu	Japan
Ultimate Sokoban (究極の倉庫番)	1998	Windows	Outback	Unbalance	Japan
Chō Sokoban 55 (チョー倉庫番55)	1997	LCD handheld game	Xing	Bandai Music Entertainment	Japan
Sokoban Basic (倉庫番ベーシック)	1997	PlayStation	Outback	Itochu	Japan
Sokoban Selection (倉庫番セレクション)	1997	Windows	Outback	Itochu	Japan
Sokoban Selection (倉庫番セレクション)	1997	Macintosh	Outback	Itochu	Japan
Sokoban Special 102 (倉庫番スペシャル102)	1998	Windows	Outback	Fujitsu Parex	Japan
Sokoban Basic 2 (倉庫番ベーシック2)	1998	PlayStation	Soft Office; Thinking Rabbit	Unbalance	Japan
Power Sokoban (Power倉庫番)	1999	Super Famicom	Atelier Double	Nintendo	Japan
Sokoban Legend: Land of Light and Darkness (倉庫番伝説 光と闇の国)	1999	Game Boy	J Wing	J Wing	Japan
Sokoban: Guide to Difficult Puzzles (倉庫番 難問指南)	1999	PlayStation	Thinking Rabbit; Three D	Unbalance	Japan
Sokoban: Guide to Difficult Puzzles (倉庫番 難問指南)	2000	Windows	—	Unbalance	Japan
Sokoban (倉庫番)	2000 (Note: Two editions were released by Unbalance, the first in March and the second in May.)	Windows	—	Unbalance	Japan
Sokoban First Step (倉庫番ファーストステップ)	2004	EZweb	Falcon	Square Enix	Japan
Sokoban Perfect (倉庫番パーフェクト) (1/2/3)	2004	EZweb	Falcon	Square Enix	Japan
Sokoban First Step (倉庫番ファーストステップ)	2004	i-mode	Falcon	Dwango	Japan
Sokoban Perfect (倉庫番パーフェクト) (1-1/1-2/1-3/2-1/2-2/2-3/3-1/3-2/3-3)	2004–2005	i-mode	Falcon	Dwango	Japan
Konami Wai Wai Sokoban (コナミワイワイ倉庫番)	2007	i-mode	Konami	Konami	Japan
Sokoban Perfect Plus A-side (倉庫番パーフェクト プラス A面)	2015	Windows	Falcon	Thinking Rabbit	Japan
Sokoban Perfect Plus B-side (倉庫番パーフェクト プラス B面)	2015	Windows	Falcon	Thinking Rabbit	Japan
Sokoban First Step Plus (倉庫番ファーストステップ プラス)	2016	Windows	Falcon	Thinking Rabbit	Japan
Sokoban Revenge Reprint (倉庫番リベンジ 復刻版)	2016	Windows	Falcon	Thinking Rabbit	Japan
Sokoban Touch	2016	Android iOS	Falcon	Thinking Rabbit	Worldwide
Sokoban Complete Pack (倉庫番 コンプリートパック)	2016	Windows	Falcon	Skill Information	Japan
Sokoban Smart (倉庫番スマート)	2018	Windows	Falcon	Thinking Rabbit	Japan
Chukyo-kun no Sokoban (チュウキョ～くんの倉庫番)	2018	Digital terrestrial television	Falcon	Chukyo Television	Japan
Dayon no Sokoban (だよんの倉庫番)	2018	Digital terrestrial television	Falcon	Miyagi Television	Japan
Kumojiro no Sokoban (くもジローの倉庫番)	2018	Digital terrestrial television	Falcon	Nippon Television	Japan
Minna no Sokoban (みんなの倉庫番)^{JP} The Sokoban	2019^{JP}	Nintendo Switch; PlayStation 4	Unbalance	Unbalance	Japan
Minna no Sokoban (みんなの倉庫番)^{JP} The Sokoban	2021	Nintendo Switch; PlayStation 4	Unbalance	Unbalance	Worldwide

== Reception ==
The first Sokoban title became a bestseller in Japan, with over 50,000 copies sold by October 1984. Junji Tanaka wrote that the first level of the PC-8801 version perplexed puzzle enthusiasts upon release. Titles for Japanese home computers, such as the NEC PC-9801 and Sharp X1, were said to have sold more than 100,000 copies combined. The MSX version alone, published by ASCII, sold over 400,000 copies and was considered a commercial success. The U.S. release, Soko-Ban, surpassed 50,000 units by mid-September 1988. By c. 1996, after 13 years of availability, the series had sold over one million copies. By c. 1998, after 15 years, total sales, including Ultimate Sokoban (究極の倉庫番) for PlayStation, exceeded 1.4 million units across all platforms, including game consoles, word processors, and electronic organizers. By 2018, Chukyo Television Broadcasting reported that the series had sold over 4.1 million copies worldwide since its 1982 release.

The 1990 book PC Games 1980s Chronicles (パソコンゲーム80年代記) described Sokoban as "the king of PC puzzles (これぞパソコンパズルの王様だ)", listing Sokoban 1, Sokoban 2, and Sokoban Perfect. It included Sokoban 1 (1983) in its top 10 games of the 1980s, a list selected by 71 industry experts based on titles they considered most memorable rather than personal preference. A 1993 article in Dengeki Oh (電撃王) magazine noted that the Sokoban series had continued for 11 years, remarking that it was unusual for a puzzle game to remain popular for more than a decade, unlike simulation and role-playing game series. Jugemu (じゅげむ) magazine noted in 1995 that Sokoban maintained its status as an exceptionally long-selling and popular puzzle game. A 1997 article published in Weekly TV Gamer (週刊TV Gamer) introduced Chō Sokoban 55 (チョー倉庫番55) and noted that Sokoban had sparked a craze among office workers through its electronic-organizer versions.

Reviewers often emphasized the game's addictive nature. In 1983, Micomgames staff remarked that players would find it difficult to stop playing Sokoban. In 1988, Roy Wagner of Computer Gaming World suggested that anyone trying the US version, Soko-Ban, would likely remain absorbed for an extended period. The Computer Entertainer newsletter described the Apple II version as engrossing and difficult to put down. Computer and Video Games magazine called Sokoban for Game Boy "an infuriatingly addictive little title" and said its appeal was "not far off" from Tetris. In 1990, Famicom Winning Guide (ファミコン必勝本) recognized Sokoban as a staple puzzle game, citing its difficulty, depth, and continued presence across multiple platforms.

Commentators often highlighted one or more aspects of the game: its simplicity, the depth of thought it required, or its challenging nature. Micomgames staff described Sokoban as simple yet requiring as much thought as, or more than, playing Go or Shogi. The 1988 book Video Games: Complete Collection of TV Games (テレビゲーム: 電視遊戯大全) described Sokoban as a pure puzzle game played on a computer, with a logic akin to Japanese disentanglement puzzles. It stated that while the game appears simple, the boxes are arranged in intricate configurations; some levels require moving other boxes for twenty moves just to shift a single target box one space. Henk Rogers of BPS described Sokoban as a great idea, noting that, unlike role-playing and simulation video games, which involved extensive scenarios and programming, it was very simple yet entertaining. Satoru Sato of ASCII wrote that Sokoban, despite its visual simplicity, was exceptionally enjoyable and reminded him of the essence of games.

A 1989 review in MSX Magazine cited Sokoban as the representative example of a purely logic-based puzzle, distinguishing it from puzzles that incorporate action elements such as enemies or time pressure, and those involving elements of chance. Family Computer Magazine's All Catalog supplement described Sokoban for Game Boy as great due to the simplicity of its gameplay, and Computer and Video Games magazine staff called it one of the Game Boy's "simple but effective puzzle games".

Reviewers for the German magazine Happy Computer praised Soko-Ban as a brilliant logic puzzle that kept players thinking without pressure and recommended that players carefully observe a level before moving a box. In Computer Gaming World, Wagner summarized it as "very playable and mentally challenging". In Game Player's magazine, Tom R. Halfhill reviewed Shove It! for the Sega Genesis, noting it was challenging and would require players to plan their moves carefully, and reviewing Boxxle for Game Boy, he stated that it required careful planning or plenty of trial and error (usually both). He later commented on Boxyboy for the TurboGrafx-16 that while the initial rooms were not difficult, players would eventually encounter a seemingly impossible room.

The series faced occasional criticism for a lack of variety. Halfhill wrote that the puzzles in Shove It! were "essentially the same", and noted that in Boxxle, variation was limited to crate count, placement, and room shape. Reviewing Boxyboy, he described it as "virtually identical" to the others, concluding that all three games required players to enjoy solving the same type of puzzle repeatedly.

== Legacy ==
Sokoban was regarded in 1990 as a pioneer in puzzle games. It sparked a "puzzle game boom (パズルゲーム・ブーム)" in the Japanese personal computer market starting in 1983 and continuing for a time. A 1984 magazine reported that the first Sokoban game was so groundbreaking that programmers at several software houses described it as an eye-opening experience. In the decades since, the series has attracted many enthusiasts in Japan and overseas. The game's core mechanics have been replicated in numerous clones across a wide variety of platforms, including the web. The Sokoban community has created thousands of levels distinct from the official releases, freely available online and ranging in difficulty.

Puzzles resembling Sokoban, involving pushing boxes or similar obstacles to the correct targets, have been present in gaming, particularly in 1980s and 1990s action-adventure games with grid-based movement. The Legend of Zelda series and titles such as Adventures of Lolo (1989) and LIT (2009) incorporate Sokoban-style elements into their gameplay; for example, The Legend of Zelda: A Link to the Past (1991) has a puzzle in which blocks must be pushed to clear a path to a treasure chest. The Legend of Zelda: Ocarina of Time (1998) includes puzzles imitating Sokoban. Resident Evil 2 (1998) includes a puzzle similar to Sokoban in which two statues must be pushed onto corresponding marked floor areas, with the correct matching inferred. Additionally, Sokoban-like games such as Sokomania 2 (2014) introduce new mechanics, including switches and conveyor belts. Sokobond (2013) is a puzzle game with elements of Sokoban and a chemical compound theme. Order of the Sinking Star (2026) recreates and combines four puzzle games in the style of Sokoban.

=== Research ===
In computational complexity theory, deciding whether any given Sokoban puzzle is solvable is a problem known to be NP-hard and PSPACE-complete. In artificial intelligence research, Sokoban serves as an experimental testbed. In 1996, Murase et al. presented a program for automatic Sokoban puzzle generation. It consisted of three stages: generation, solvability checking, and evaluation. Across 500 trials, it output 44 candidates, of which experts considered 14 to be good puzzles.

As a problem domain, Sokoban exhibits a variable branching factor and solution lengths significantly longer than in other domains. In the standard XSokoban test suite, consisting of ninety problems, box counts range from 6 to 34. With up to four potential pushes per box, the branching factor ranges from 0 to 136. Reported solution lengths for this suite range from 97 to 674 pushes. These lengths far exceed the maximum solution lengths of the 15-puzzle and Rubik's Cube, which require at most 80 and 20 moves, respectively. The search space for 20×20 Sokoban mazes is estimated at 10^{98}.

The standard test suite presents a medium-level challenge to humans but has proven difficult for automated solvers. Humans solve Sokoban puzzles by breaking them down into subproblems, recognizing patterns and exceptions, and drawing on learning from prior puzzles. An automated Sokoban solver developed at Meiji University by Ueno et al. in 1994 solved 25 of the 90 problems in the suite. In subsequent research, Rolling Stone, developed by Andreas Junghanns at the University of Alberta, was described in publications from 1997 to 2001. It employed a conventional search algorithm enhanced with domain-specific techniques such as deadlock detection. By 2001, it had solved 59 problems in the standard test suite. Talking Stones, developed at the University of Liège by Demaret et al., solved 54 problems in 2008 in the same suite.

In 2020, Yaron Shoham and Jonathan Schaeffer introduced FESS, a search algorithm that uses two related spaces: the domain space and an abstract feature space defined by handcrafted, application-specific features. The feature space guides the search in the domain space. The Festival solver, based on FESS, solved all 90 problems in the standard test suite, becoming the first program to solve the entire suite. That same year, Feng et al. proposed an approach based on curriculum learning, in which a model is trained to solve a level by first solving easier versions with fewer boxes and storage locations, and gradually increasing the difficulty until the model can solve the full level. This approach was able to solve several hard levels. In 2021, Shoham and Gal Elidan presented a reinforcement learning approach in which a backward-learning agent generated paths that were subsequently used to provide hints to a forward-learning agent. After training both agents on 155 beginner levels, the approach solved 88 of the 90 problems in the standard test suite.

== See also ==
- Logic puzzle
- Sliding puzzle
- Transport puzzle
- Motion planning
