= Shove It! The Warehouse Game =

1990 video game

- North American box art
- Developer: NCS
- Publishers: Masaya (Japan); DreamWorks (NA)
- Series: Sokoban
- Platform: Sega Genesis
- Release: JP: 30 January 1990; NA: April 1990
- Genre: Puzzle
- Mode: Single-player

Shove It! The Warehouse Game (Note: Known in Japan as The Greatest Sokoban in History (Japanese: 史上最大の倉庫番, Hepburn: Shijō Saidai no Sōkoban)) is a 1990 sokoban puzzle video game developed by NCS in Japan. A port of the game was later released in North America by DreamWorks. (Note: Not to be confused with DreamWorks Interactive) The game was showcased by DreamWorks at the Sega booth of the Winter 1990 Consumer Electronics Show. Upon release in North America, the game received mixed reviews, with some critics finding the gameplay challenging and addictive, and others faulting the game's graphics, sound, and lack of features.

== Gameplay ==
Gameplay screenshot

The player is a dockworker named Stevedore who is working overtime to move crates to earn money to purchase a red sports car to win the affections of his love interest. As with other sokoban puzzle games, the objective of Shove It! is to maneuver Stevedore to push all crates into specific areas on the floor designated by white dots. The game features 16 levels, each with 10 puzzles, with completion of 8 puzzles in a level allowing the player to progress to the next. Progression is saved using a password system. Players have several options to assist them to complete puzzles: they can press a button to undo their last move, restart the level, or restart the level and repeat the steps of their previous attempt up until before they made a mistake. The game also features an Edit mode that allows players to create new sokoban puzzles.

== Reception ==
Reception

Review scores
| Publication | Score |
|---|---|
| Electronic Gaming Monthly | 4/10, 3/10, 3/10, 3/10 |
| VideoGames & Computer Entertainment | 4/10 |

Describing the game as "extremely tough" and addictive, GamePro praised the game's challenge, although wrote its music and graphics were "not the strongest". Reviewers for Electronic Gaming Monthly questioned the game's inclusion on the Genesis, expecting more of the gameplay and finding it "boring and repetitive". Critiquing the game's "redundant play [and] silly objective", Video Games & Computer Entertainment described the game's premise as sexist and considered the graphics were disappointingly "flat".
