= Boxxle =

1989 video game

- North American version cover
- Developer: Atelier Double Co.
- Publishers: Pony Canyon, FCI
- Platform: Game Boy
- Release: JP: 1 September 1989; US: 15 March 1990; EU: 1991
- Genre: Puzzle
- Mode: Single-player

Boxxle (Note: Known in Japan as 倉庫番 (Sōkoban)) is a 1989 sokoban puzzle video game for the Game Boy developed by Atelier Double Co. and published by Pony Canyon in Japan and FCI in North America and Europe.

The game was one of the first licensed third-party titles for the Game Boy. released in Japan for the Game Boy on September 1, 1989. A sequel, Boxxle II, was released in 1990.

== Gameplay ==
Gameplay screenshot

Similar to other sokoban puzzles, the objective of Boxxle is to manoevure the player to push a series of boxes on dots in designated positions to clear the level. The game features 108 levels. An edit mode allows the player to create and modify their own levels. The game uses a password system for players to save progress.

== Reception ==
Reception

Review scores
Publication	Score
Computer and Video Games	88%
Electronic Gaming Monthly	7/10, 7/10, 6/10, 5/10
Famitsu	6/10, 6/10, 7/10, 6/10
Total!	69%

Boxxle was released in Japan for the Game Boy on September 1, 1989.

Several critics praised the challenge and addictiveness of the sokoban puzzles. Electronic Gaming Monthly praised the level of thought and planning required to solve the puzzles, although found the game "gets so hard and complex it becomes more of a chore". Comparing the game to Tetris, Computer & Video Games praised the game as "simple but effective", "infuriatingly addictive", and ideal for the Game Boy. TOTAL! found the game "unspectacular-looking", unexciting and lacking variety, and the puzzle concept "too basic [to] hold interest for long". Comic Book Resources and TheGamer retrospectively described Boxxle as one of the most difficult titles for the Game Boy.

== See also ==
- List of Game Boy games
