= Boxxle II =

1990 video game

- North American version cover
- Developer: Atelier Double Co.
- Publishers: JP: Pony Canyon; US: FCI
- Platform: Game Boy
- Release: JP: 22 June 1990; US: June 1992
- Genre: Puzzle
- Mode: Single-player

Boxxle II (Note: Known in Japan as 倉庫番 2 (Sōkoban 2)) is a 1990 sokoban puzzle video game for the Game Boy developed by Atelier Double Co.. It was published by Pony Canyon in Japan and FCI in the United States. It is the sequel to the 1989 Game Boy title Boxxle.

== Gameplay ==
Gameplay screenshot

In Boxxle II, the female love interest of the protagonist, Willy, has been abducted by an alien spacecraft. Willy must push boxes to earn money to buy a spacecraft to rescue her. The objective of the game, as in Boxxle and other sokoban puzzles are to push boxes into all marked positions to complete the level. Players can press a button to undo their last move. There are 120 levels in groups of ten. The game introduces a new feature: 'reappearance', which allows players to review and change their moves in the last attempt of a level to omptimise their strategy. It also features an editor in 'create' mode for players to create and modify levels. A password system allows players to save progress.

== Release and reception ==
Reception

Review scores
Publication	Score
Famitsu	6/10, 7/10, 7/10, 5/10
Mega Fun	75%
Total!	72%
Video Games	80%

Boxxle II was published in Japan by Pony Canyon on June 22, 1990. It was released in the United States in June 1992 where it was published by FCI America.

A number of critics considered Boxxle II to be virtually the same as its predecessor and to be similarly challenging, with Video Games writing that "apart from the intro, story and appearance of the levels, nothing has changed". The Japanese Family Computer's All Catalog supplement noted that this second installment was significantly more difficult.Total! stated the game offered "no real improvement over the first one", and felt it was infuriatingly difficult, and the levels were "very samey". Nintendo Power reviewers felt the sokoban puzzles were quickly too challenging, and wished the game had a feature to provide players with the solution if they were stuck. Mega Fun felt the game was entertaining but "incredibly tough", also encountering issues with the reliability of the game's password system which "ruined the fun". Video Games lamented that the lack of a battery in the game cartridge meant that players could not save their own rooms.

== See also ==
- 1990 in video games
- List of Game Boy games
