= Transport puzzle =

Type of logic puzzle

Transport puzzles are logistical puzzles, which often represent real-life transportation problems. The classic transport puzzle is the river crossing puzzle in which three objects are transported across a river one at time while avoiding leaving certain pairs of objects together. The term should not be confused with the usage of transport puzzle as a shortened form of transportation puzzle, representing children's puzzles with different transportation vehicles used as puzzle pieces.

== Description ==
A transport problem is one in which objects are moved from a starting position to a destination position following the logical rules of the puzzle. Transport puzzles do not necessarily involve any physical movement of objects, although they often do. Rather, they are those puzzles that consist of finding a path through the state space of the puzzle to reach the goal state. State changes can include rotations and distortions of the object being transported as well as its translation in space.

As in rearrangement puzzles, no piece is ever lost or added to the board. In contrast to rearrangement puzzles, however, transport puzzles have all persons and objects follow certain routes given on the board; they cannot be lifted off the board and placed on faraway positions that have no visible connection to the from-position. Hence transport puzzles often mean that the player has to move (physical) objects in a very restricted space. The player may or may not be part of the game (either directly, or as a player character on the board).

== Types of transport puzzles ==
- Tour puzzles are first-person transport puzzles: the player does the tour him/herself or is represented by a player character on the board.
  - labyrinths: player runs one convoluted path way, no dead ends.
  - mazes: player runs fixed set of pathways, many dead ends.
  - Sokoban-type puzzles: player pushes objects into place.
  - sliding puzzles with single player, for example Rush Hour
  - other first-person transport puzzles. Some of them are elimination puzzles: these are similar to Sokoban-type puzzles, but one eliminates pieces on the way rather than pushing them around.
- Other transport games: The player is not represented in the game.
  - sliding puzzles: slide pieces (on a board) into place.
    - The fifteen puzzle is the best known example of these.
  - train shunting puzzles: move trains and carriages along tracks.
  - river crossing puzzles: move a set of pieces across a river using a bridge or boat. Certain conditions apply.

== Math ==
The Seven Bridges of Königsberg is a historically notable problem in mathematics. Its negative resolution by Leonhard Euler in 1736 laid the foundations of graph theory and prefigured the idea of topology.

== Literature ==
The famous British puzzler Henry Dudeney added several puzzles to this category.

Transportation puzzles can be used to study intelligence and educational issues. They are good for this purpose because, as logic puzzles, they require no outside information. Everything needed is contained within the puzzle. Also, the state-space representation makes them amenable to computer analysis, but at the same time they are appealing to human subjects of cognitive psychology experiments.

== See also ==
- List of puzzle video games
- Puzzle
- Motion planning

== Bibliography ==
- Coldridge, Jack; Amos, Martyn (2010). "Genetic algorithms and the art of Zen". 2010 IEEE Fifth International Conference on Bio-Inspired Computing: Theories and Applications (BIC-TA). pp. 1417–1423. arXiv:1005.4446. doi:10.1109/BICTA.2010.5645284. ISBN 978-1-4244-6437-1. S2CID 14437463.
- Amos, Martyn; Coldridge, Jack (2011). "A genetic algorithm for the Zen Puzzle Garden game". Natural Computing. 11 (3): 353–359. doi:10.1007/s11047-011-9284-7. ISSN 1567-7818. S2CID 2118389.
- Jarušek, Petr; Pelánek, Radek, "What determines difficulty of transport puzzles?", Proceedings of the Twenty-fourth International FLAIRS Conference, pp. 428-433, 18-20 May 2011.
- Postma, Jelle, Generic Puzzle Level Generation for Deterministic Transport Puzzles, Utrecht University, December 2016.
- Uduslivii, Igor, iPhone Game Blueprints, Packt Publishing, 2013 ISBN 1849690278.
