= Haruka Sawamura =

Fictional character in the Yakuza video game series

- Yakuza / Like a Dragon character
- Haruka Sawamura as she appears in Yakuza 6: The Song of Life (2016)
- First game: Yakuza (2005)
- Created by: Toshihiro Nagoshi
- Voiced by: English: Debi Derryberry (2005) Xanthe Huynh (2023–present); Japanese: Rie Kugimiya
- Portrayed by: Natsuo (Like a Dragon); Ran Sakai (Ryu ga Gotoku stage play)

In-universe information
- Nationality: Japanese

Haruka Sawamura (Japanese: 澤村 遥, Hepburn: Sawamura Haruka) is a main character in Sega's action-adventure game franchise Like a Dragon (formerly known as Yakuza in English localization). She is introduced in the first Yakuza game as a young child searching for her missing mother, while being mysteriously pursued by multiple yakuza clans, including the Tojo Clan. Kazuma Kiryu, the main playable character throughout most of the franchise, protects and assists her during her search for her mother and Haruka is later adopted by him at the end of the first game.

Over the course of the series, Haruka grows up alongside her adoptive father, debuting as a playable character in Yakuza 5 working as an idol and eventually starting a family of her own in Yakuza 6: The Song of Life. Haruka is voiced by Rie Kugimiya in Japanese, by Debi Derryberry in the English version of the first game, and by Xanthe Huynh in English releases from Like a Dragon Gaiden: The Man Who Erased His Name onward.

Haruka was created by Toshihiro Nagoshi as an alternative protagonist to Kiryu due to her growth in her debut. Although initially absent from Yakuza 6, Nagoshi wrote the narrative to mark the appearance of her son Haruto as the center of Haruka's past once again. Critical reception to Haruka has been positive based on her relationship with Kiryu and her growth in Yakuza 5.

== Creation and development ==
Although Kazuma Kiryu is the player character for Yakuza, Toshihiro Nagoshi refrained from calling him the protagonist, as the narrative was focused on the character Haruka Sawamura, who has a more significant character arc over the course of the game. The same strategy was used for Yakuza 2 where the narrative focuses more on the new character Kaoru Sayama rather than Kiryu. Nagoshi said that Kiryu and Haruka are trying to live a "more 'human' life" throughout Yakuza 3.

When Haruka was confirmed playable in Yakuza 5, Nagoshi refrained from revealing her gameplay, but still noted it would be different the other members from the cast. Sega claims that thanks to Haruka's characterization Sega was able to introduce new types of gameplay in Yakuza 5. When asked about the character in the context of her debut as a playable protagonist, Nagoshi said "this is the first time we've included a female protagonist, Haruka Sawamura. The game's overall theme is dreams, and the game follows the lives of those people who are pursuing their dreams."

Yakuza 6 focuses on the family relationship between Kiryu and Haruka after years of being separated. In retrospective Nagoshi stated that while Haruka aged in Yakuza 5 notably in comparison to her debut, she was still the same character. He added that while Haruka was originally "a presence that you constantly have to think about her at the centre of things", this type of focus was decreased in later games. As a result, with the appearance of Haruka's son, Haruto, in Yakuza 6, Nagoshi believes that Haruka was once again the center of attention to the audience, even if she is not physically present. In regard to Haruka's presence, Nagoshi wanted the premise to focus on the new characters related to Haruka.

Haruka's voice actress is Rie Kugimiya, who found her character "refreshing" in the cast of the series. Kugimiya's role was found challenging by the developers but in the end, they found it appealing. Kugimiya regarded Haruka difficult due to her complicated background.

== Appearances ==
Haruka as she appears in Yakuza Kiwami, the 2016 remake of the original Yakuza.

Introduced in Yakuza, Haruka is a young girl searching for her mother, Mizuki, who appears to be the sister of Yumi Sawamura. Haruka is also somehow connected to the Tojo Clan money that went missing before Kiryu's release from prison, and after finding her in the aftermath of a violent clash between Yakuza, Kiryu decides to protect her and help her find her mother. Kiryu eventually learns that Mizuki is Yumi, and that she and Haruka were hiding from her husband, Jingu, a politician who had tried to kill them both to prevent a scandal from affecting his career. Jingu also wants Haruka's pendant, which will grant him access to the missing money. Jingu tries to kill Haruka, and Yumi is fatally injured protecting her. After Yumi's death, Kiryu decides to adopt Haruka and start a new life.

In Yakuza 2, she is 10 years old. Haruka has lived with Kiryu as her adoptive father since the events of the first game. In the beginning of the game, she stays at Sunflower Orphanage while Kiryu investigates Terada's murder. She is kidnapped by Sengoku's men in an attempt to lure Kiryu into a trap; in the end he manages to defeat Sengoku's men and rescue Haruka with the help of Ryuji Goda, who is disgusted by Sengoku's willingness to hurt children to gain power.

In Yakuza 3, Haruka now lives in the Morning Glory Orphanage run by Kiryu in Okinawa with a group of other orphans while she attends school. She is the oldest of the children and takes on responsibilities helping Kiryu and assisting him with his tasks.

Haruka does not play a major role in Yakuza 4, although she and Kiryu assist the recently escaped Taiga Saejima when he is injured. She later disagrees with Kiryu's decision to return to Kamurocho, due to her fear of losing him.

In Yakuza 5, she is 16 years old, and becomes one of the five playable characters. In 2012, Haruka has left Okinawa for Osaka to pursue her dream of becoming an idol. Despite the stress of her new career, Haruka rises in popularity while working in Sotenbori, but is shocked when her manager Mirei Park dies, seemingly of suicide. She meets up with Kiryu's friend, money lender Shun Akiyama, and the two search for the truth behind Park's death, discovering that she was actually murdered. During her idol debut in Tokyo, Haruka comes to regret her choices, especially after learning she was still being aided by Kiryu, who was trying to prevent Yakuza interference with the concert. In the end, Haruka abandons her career as an idol and returns to Morning Glory with her adoptive father.

In Yakuza 6: The Song of Life, Haruka abandons the orphanage after seeing how her friends are being affected by the media attention to her Yakuza connections. Released from prison after three years, Kiryu returns to Kamurocho to search for Haruka. He discovers that she is in a coma after a hit and run incident, and that she has an infant son, Haruto. Kiryu travels to the town of Onomichi, where he learns that Haruka had been friendly with the Yomei Alliance's Hirose family and had entered into a relationship with Yuta Usami. The revelation of Yuta being the heir of the Saio Triad results in her being attacked by Tatsukawa. Haruka recovers from her injuries and decides to start a family with Yuta and Haruto in Morning Glory. However, she does so without Kiryu, who has faked his death to protect her and Haruto.

In Like a Dragon Gaiden: The Man Who Erased His Name, Haruka continues to look after the residents of Morning Glory. When Kiryu attempts to call the orphanage to warn them of the Daidoji agents, Haruka answers the phone but hears no response, due to Kiryu being blackmailed by his handler Kihei Hanawa. On the anniversary of Kiryu's "death", Haruka takes Haruto to visit Kiryu's grave in Okinawa, unaware of the hidden camera nearby that watches over the grave.

In Like a Dragon: Infinite Wealth, Haruka alongside Haruto visit Serena to meet Makoto Date and Shun Akiyama, unbeknownst to her the latter two had planned for her to meet Kazuma Kiryu. Kiryu overhearing her conversation decided not to visit her. This action angered the Daidoji Faction and Makoto Date suffered a violent punishment as a result of his betrayal towards them, they did however spare him from death as Kiryu did not visit Haruka.

Later in the game Haruka and Haruto after learning about Kiryu being alive, visit him in hospital. They arrive at his room but he is absent from his room as he receives radiation treatment for cancer, Haruka reassures Haruto that Kiryu will return.

=== Spinoffs and other appearances ===
Haruka appears in the non-canonical spinoff Yakuza: Dead Souls, where she is 14 years old and the victim of a kidnapping by a mysterious man. Versions of Haruka with the same name and avatar also appear in the spin-off titles Ryū ga Gotoku Kenzan! and Like a Dragon: Ishin!.

Haruka is portrayed by an actress named Natsuo in the 2007 live-action film adaptation Like a Dragon, and by Ran Sakai for the stage play adaptation.

== Reception ==
Critical reception to Haruka has been positive. Vandal claimed that Haruka's meeting with Kiryu was one of the biggest points from the series due to how their relationship develops until Yakuza 6. RPGamer criticized that in her debut Haruka is kidnapped multiple times in the story, making the game ridiculous. Destructoid reported that the cutscenes involving Kiryu and Haruka were the most entertaining parts of the series. PCInvasion regarded Haruka's relationship with Kiryu as the strongest part from Yakuza Kiwami as they develop a strong bond with Haruka's traits making Kiryu less stoic to the point of comparing them as a daughter and a father, respectively. In a 2018 popularity poll, Haruka was voted as the 17th best Yakuza character. GamesRadar listed her as one of gaming's best female characters, due to her care towards other members in the cast of the Yakuza series.

Many commenters focused on her debut as playable character. USGamer appreciated playing as Haruka in Yakuza 5 due to the change of pace Sega provided after multiple types of fighters in the narrative and felt that her long distanced relationship with her adoptive father was the most appealing area of the game. HobbyConsolas stated while idols might not be interesting to Western gamers, Haruka still offered more variety to the game. GameSpot also liked the handling of her story due to how the character has matured ever since her debut although the reviews had mixed opinions about Haruka's career. Egmnow praised how Haruka's character stands out across the series starting with how Kiryu finds her in a store alone and how she grows into a popular idol in Yakuza 5. As a result, the writer believes Haruka added "a feminine touch" into a narrative focused on masculine fighters. Polygon wrote an article about how Haruka is relevant in a narrative filled with toxic masculinity, she is still depending on others including Kiryu and Akiyama despite achieving her dreams of becoming an idol. IGN liked how surprising the option to play as Haruka was due to how different she is from other characters. Meanwhile, RPGFan considered Haruka's gameplay to be most outstanding in the game due to how the mechanics emulate Kiryu's fight as Haruka has to keep her own health meter during dance fights. Rock Paper Shotgun called her as one of the most deep female character in the franchise as previous female characters are often the subject of male gaze for the players despite the developers attempt to bring active female character to the narrative like Kaoru Sayama in Yakuza 2; Haruka was noted to stand out as her career forces her to encounter fans of idols which contrasts police dramas-like stories featured in Yakuza 5. In another article, the same website enjoyed the J-pop work as the player encounters more singers in Haruka's life performing different typs of themes.

There has been commentary about Haruka's role in Yakuza 6. Destructoid liked the handling of Kiryu, due to his more serious personality caused by Haruka's crisis. GameRevolution shared similar comments, mainly on how Haruka also has been developing in previous games to stay close to her adoptive father and this time it was Kiryu's quest to protect her in Yakuza 6. Kotaku claimed while Haruka's newfound happiness with Haruto serves a positive note to close Kiryu's arc, the fact that Kiryu survives and leaves reduced the tension the player has.
