= Yakuza: Dead Souls =

2011 video game

- Developer: Sega CS1 R&D
- Publisher: Sega
- Director: Kazuki Hosokawa
- Producer: Yasuhito Baba
- Designer: Riichirō Yamada
- Artist: Saizo Nagai
- Writer: Tsuyoshi Furuta
- Composer: Mitsuharu Fukuyama
- Series: Yakuza
- Platform: PlayStation 3
- Release: JP: June 9, 2011; NA: March 13, 2012; EU: March 16, 2012
- Genres: Action-adventure, survival horror
- Mode: Single-player

Yakuza: Dead Souls (Note: Japanese: 龍が如く OF THE END(オブ ジ エンド), Hepburn: Ryū ga Gotoku OF THE END) is a 2011 action-adventure survival horror video game developed and published by Sega for the PlayStation 3. The game is a spin-off of the Like a Dragon series. The game was originally scheduled for release in Japan on March 17, 2011 two days after the release of Yakuza 4 in North America; however, after the 2011 Tōhoku earthquake and tsunami, the release was indefinitely delayed. A new release date, setting the game's release for June 9, was announced on April 7. The game was also released in North America and Europe by Sega in March 2012. The gameplay and themes are based on another Sega horror-themed rail shooter called The House of the Dead series.

== Plot ==
=== Synopsis and characters ===
Dead Souls is a non-canonical side story set during April 2011, one year after the events of Yakuza 4. A sudden zombie outbreak spreads throughout Kamurocho, and is slowly quarantined as the Japan Ground Self-Defense Force is called in to contain the infection. In the wake of the outbreak, four men seek to help the people of Kamurocho and find the source of the disease: Shun Akiyama, a moneylender attempting to rescue his secretary Hana; Goro Majima, a feared yakuza and construction boss trying to stave off his own infection; Ryuji Goda, who has survived his wounds at the end of Yakuza 2 and is working as a takoyaki chef; and Kazuma Kiryu, an orphanage caretaker and former yakuza forced to return to Kamurocho when his adopted daughter Haruka is kidnapped. The game is split in four parts, each focusing on a particular character.

=== Summary ===
Shun Akiyama and his secretary Hana witness a zombified figure attacking yakuza of the Tojo Clan. With the assistance of Tojo Clan member Tomoaki Nagahama, Akiyama and Hana are able to return to their office. Later, Hana falls ill while their office is overrun by zombies, so Akiyama moves her to the New Serena bar. While looking for medicine for Hana, Akiyama sees several massive barricades planted all over Kamurocho by the Japanese Self-Defense Force (SDF) in order to contain the outbreak. After getting the medicine for Hana and parting ways with Nagahama, Akiyama returns to find Hana gone and New Serena overrun. He receives a message from her that she moved to an abandoned hotel; Akiyama reunites with her and saves her from a powerful mutant known as the "Prototype". Akiyama manages to kill it, and discovers that the prototype was manufactured by someone who may also know about the outbreak in Kamurocho.

Meanwhile, Goro Majima's headquarters are attacked by the zombies, but a combat-enthusiastic Majima easily dispatches them. Majima heads to Kamurocho Hills to help escaping citizens and to locate the remaining Tojo Clan members. With help from Tojo chairman Daigo Dojima, Majima is able to assist the survivors, but is bitten by a zombie in the process. At Purgatory, a gambling den, an information broker known as "The Florist" suggests to Daigo and Majima that the Omi Alliance might be responsible for Kamurocho's outbreak, as the initial attack was against the Tojo Clan, and former member Ryuji Goda and top officer Tetsuo Nikaido were seen in Kamurocho before the outbreak started. Akiyama and Majima go to the batting cage where they encounter Nikaido and an unknown accomplice of his, who admit to being behind the outbreak; Nikaido declares that he wants to avenge Ryuji's defeat at the hands of Kiryu, despite Ryuji's disapproval. Nikaido then summons another prototype mutant, but it is eventually killed due to the sudden arrival of Ryuji.

A flashback reveals that after Ryuji's expulsion from the Omi Alliance, he started a new life working at a takoyaki stand under the mentorship of a veteran chef called Pops. One day, Nikaido urged him to return to the alliance, but Ryuji refused and insisted that he has no intention of getting revenge on Kiryu. In the present, Ryuji goes to a night club to confront Nikaido; when Ryuji once again refuses to take part in his vendetta against Kiryu, Nikaido releases another prototype which is revealed to be a mutated Pops, and a dejected Ryuji is forced to kill him before swearing vengeance on Nikaido.

In Okinawa, Kazuma Kiryu receives a mysterious phone call from someone who claims to have kidnapped Haruka; the caller demands Kiryu return to Kamurocho if he wants to see Haruka again. Kiryu arrives in Kamurocho and meets SDF soldier Misuzu Asagi. After killing the zombified Nagahama, the two head to Kamurocho Hills to look for Asagi's comrades, but they have already been zombified by the mutant which attacked the Tojo earlier: Hiroshi Hayashi, former Omi Alliance officer and an old rival of Kiryu. After killing the zombified soldiers, Kiryu and Asagi meet Majima, who tells them that survivors are taking refuge in Purgatory. Majima then leaves them both, not wanting to endanger them if he turns, and to find a cure for his infection. Kiryu also recalls the flashback where he received the mail meant for Haruka's new career at Kamurocho, before he learned too late that the mail was a set up by Nikaido to kidnap her, in order to lure Kiryu into his trap via zombie outbreak.

The Florist and Akiyama inform Kiryu that Nikaido's accomplice is an arms dealer named "DD", who started the outbreak with Thanatos, a bioweapon of DD's creation. Kiryu and Ryuji then storm the Millennium Tower to save Haruka and defeat Nikaido. Along the way, they defeat Hayashi, who reveals that he was made into a mutant after refusing Nikaido and DD's plan to destroy the Tojo Clan before dying. They continue to fight through Nikaido and DD's remaining prototypes and witness DD turn Nikaido into a mutant. Kiryu and Ryuji defeat Nikaido, but he further mutates into a towering beast; after Kiryu defeats him a final time with the help of Asagi, DD tries to escape in a helicopter which is piloted by Akiyama; he jumps to safety before letting the helicopter and DD crash into the zombies below.

The next morning, the SDF has eliminated the remaining zombies and ended the outbreak. Majima is revealed to be well, as the zombie that bit him had dentures, and his fever was simply due to his pollen allergy. Some time later, everyone returns to their old lives; Akiyama and Hana resume their moneylending business, Majima continues to supervise Kamurocho Hills, Ryuji now runs the takoyaki stand in Pops' place, and Kiryu and Haruka return to Okinawa once more.

In a post-credits scene, the police and SDF have a tense standoff with a supposed zombie, but he is revealed to simply be a drunken man.

== Development and release ==
Promotional image of the game, showing Kamurocho in ruins

The game was first announced in June 2010, during an interview with series producer Toshihiro Nagoshi in Japanese gaming magazine Famitsu, during which he mentioned that a new Ryū ga Gotoku game was in development and that it would star Goro Majima. Majima, as well as the new project, was officially confirmed on July 1, on the official website.

In August 2010, a two-page advertisement appeared in Famitsu, showing Kamurocho in ruins, with the words "The End" over the image. The name of the game was officially announced in a September issue of Famitsu and confirmed on the game's official site on September 9. Video footage of the game was shown for the first time at the Tokyo Game Show 2010, showing footage of minigames such as darts, fishing, batting and karaoke. It also showed scenes of the town being overrun by zombies and destroyed by a large, black monster and many small creatures. Footage afterwards on the Ryu-Stream channel showed the cabaret girls' actors "shooting" a zombie actor with guns.

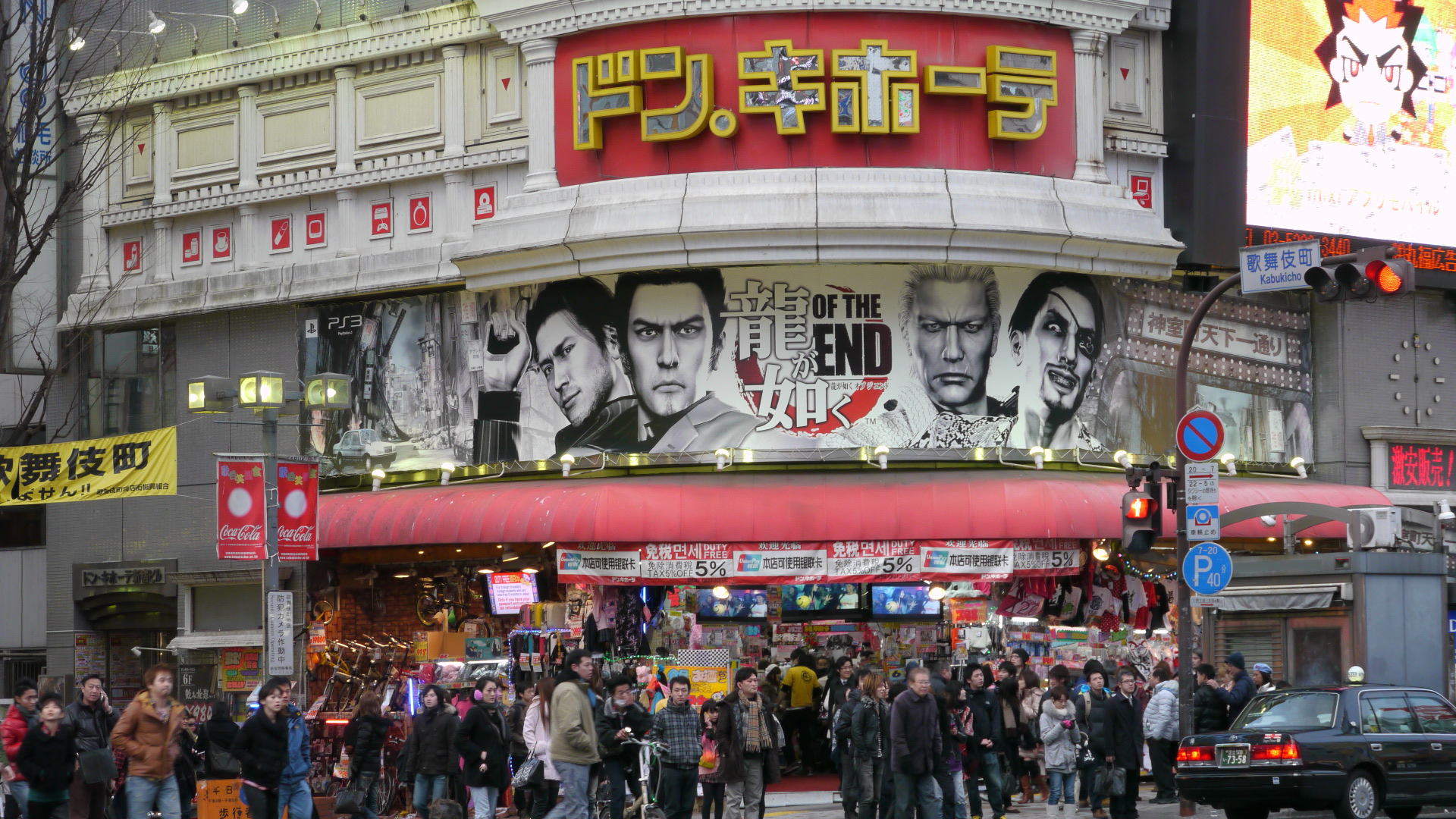
Promotional advertisement of Dead Souls, styled with its original Japanese title, at a Don Quijote outlet in Kabukichō

A series of announcements were then made on the main site, beginning in late July and continuing throughout August, with all four main characters being revealed one by one. Kazuma Kiryu was the first to be confirmed after Majima, on July 21. Shun Akiyama was then announced on August 4, and Ryuji Goda was then revealed in the final announcement on August 18. Following each character's confirmation, a large poster of him was erected across the east exits of the Shinjuku branch of Don Quijote, a shop that features in the game itself as a tie-in, and was replaced by the next character when he was announced.

=== Tie-ins ===
A recurring theme in the series is tie-ins, in which real-life businesses, restaurant chains or products are promoted prior to the game's release and within the game itself. A range of awamori drinks by Okinawa's Seifuku Distillery were licensed. A range of goods, including bracelets and T-shirts, was sold at Don Quijote, a store chain which has been featured in most games so far. Also sold at Don Quijote was a themed energy drink called "Energy Dragon".

Another returning tie-in was a promotion with 777town, in which a Kazuma Kiryu avatar was available for use with the 777town website, and Volcano, a pachinko centre sponsored by the website, was included within the game. A collaboration with a hat brand, Override, was shown in-game; the hat was also available for purchase from Override's website. A men's fragrance, "Black Dragon", was designed by producer Toshihiro Nagoshi, and appears both in-game and at retailers such as Don Quijote.

Another promotion with Kai Razor included a Ryū ga Gotoku strap and razor case, and protagonist Kazuma Kiryu is shown shaving with one of their razors in an in-game cutscene. Another Kai Razor campaign featured bracelets designed by Nagoshi, Takaya Kuroda, Hidenari Ugaki, and the hostess' performers, as well as a nail clipper.

Karaoke Kan, a karaoke venue featured in the game since Yakuza 3, was included in another promotion. The first 200 customers to visit the special series rooms were awarded one of the three tie-in prizes (80 of each of the T-shirt and Kai Razor prizes were available, while 40 bottles of Black Dragon were given away), and an alternative "Karaoke Kan Version" of the game's commercial was played there, featuring Jun Komori, a model who appears as a masseuse in the game.

The game's characters, and a Kamuro-cho gate outfit, are available in the PSP game Taiko no Tatsujin Portable DX, which features "Machinegun Kiss", a karaoke song from the Yakuza series.

=== Limited edition ===
In the aftermath of the 2011 Tōhoku earthquake and tsunami, the game's packaging was changed to a "Ganbarō, Nippon!" version with Kiryu and Haruka on the cover; the first pressing included a set of stickers featuring the two. Also included with early preorders was a soundtrack CD, part of the series' recurring Kamutai preorder bonus series.

=== Special items ===
Like its PS3 predecessors, some special items are available in the game if a save file from another game in the series is detected. If Yakuza 3 save data is present, players receive the Sunshine Belly Warmer, while Ryū ga Gotoku Kenzan! save data grants the Gion Bell (祇園の鈴 (Gion no Suzu)) and Yakuza 4 data awards the Sugar Daddy Amulet (札束のお守). In the western release, players with a Yakuza 3 save receive both the Sunshine Belly Warmer and the Gion Bell, due to Kenzan! not receiving an English-language release.

== Reception ==
Reception

Aggregate score
Aggregator	Score
Metacritic	64/100

Review scores
Publication	Score
Destructoid	7/10
Eurogamer	7/10
Game Informer	7.75/10
GameRevolution	7/10
GameSpot	5.5/10
GamesRadar+	3/5
IGN	5/10
PlayStation Official Magazine – UK	6/10
Push Square	6/10

The game received overall average reviews, with most criticism focused on its combat system, and praise focused on the story. The game is assigned a 64/100 on Metacritic, classified as mixed or average reviews as the most common reviews of the game.

PlayStation LifeStyle's Heath Hindman called the game "OK for what it is" in his review, praising the story and boss fights, but didn't like the dwarfed exploration and how dull the combat became as the game went on, saying, "Yakuza: Dead Souls isn't going to bring in any new blood to the Yakuza series, but for its existing fans, it provides an interesting story and gameplay elements that haven't been explored previously. Combat against the common zombies gets old fast, but there are some great boss battles to balance it out. As a huge Yakuza fan myself, I somewhat enjoyed the game, but wish there would have been a little better pacing and more chances to explore."

Retrospectively reviewing Dead Souls for Tom's Guide in light of the series' later popularity and expanded availability, Marshal Honorof criticized it for its "abysmal" shooting controls which they said had poor precision and mobility options, as well as the indefinite respawning of zombie enemies which they believed made the game tedious and unfun. Additionally, they said that the choice to make the game a third person shooter instead of a brawler like the main series made the game feel inauthentic to the Japanese setting. While Honorof praised the humor, premise, and optional content of Dead Souls, as well as its partner system, they said that it was readily apparent why Sega had not rereleased the game on modern platforms as they had done with many other games in the series. However, Honorof also said it "deserves credit for trying something new" and expressed concern about its limited availability.

=== Sales ===
Within five days of its release in Japan, the game sold 298,717 copies, topping the Media Create sales chart for its release week. It remained in the top 20 by its fifth week of release, selling a total of 394,902 copies. As of March 31, 2012, it sold 550,000 copies worldwide.

== See also ==
- Impact of the 2011 Tōhoku earthquake and tsunami on the video game industry
