= Characters of the Yakuza series =

A promotional illustration of a number of characters from the Yakuza series in a popularity contest launched by Sega in 2018. From left to right: Akira "Nishiki" Nishikiyama, Makoto Date, Haruka Sawamura, Taiga Saejima, Kazuma Kiryu, Goro Majima, Shun Akiyama, and Ryuji Goda.

A screenshot of Like a Dragon: Infinite Wealth, which shows the game's cast of playable characters.

Japanese video game developer Sega's Yakuza media franchise, known as Ryū ga Gotoku (龍が如く, lit. "Like a Dragon") in its native Japan and other Asian territories, features an extensive cast of characters. This article describes notable characters who appear in the Yakuza main series video games and associated remasters or remakes, with characters sorted by organizations or groups according to the original works. The English-language adaptation equivalents are mentioned when available.

In the first three installments, the sole playable protagonist is Kazuma Kiryu, a former yakuza who after ten years of imprisonment deals with chaos emerging from the yakuza organization he was formerly affiliated with, the Tojo clan. Yakuza 4 introduces three playable protagonists in addition to Kiryu. Yakuza 5 continued this trend and features five playable protagonists including Haruka Sawamura, a ward of Kiryu's whose story arc is devoid of combat mechanics. The prequel installment Yakuza 0 featured two protagonists, Kiryu and recurring supporting character Goro Majima. Kiryu is the only playable character in Yakuza 6, while an additional story played from Majima's perspective was added to the remake of Yakuza 2, Yakuza Kiwami 2. The 2 most recent mainline instalments, Yakuza: Like a Dragon and Like a Dragon: Infinite Wealth, features a new cast of characters. Players take control of a group of companions led by Ichiban Kasuga and the game introduces a new turn-based fighting style, opposed to the brawler free roam style of earlier instalments .

== Concept and design ==
The series originated from creator Toshihiro Nagoshi's desire to design a game that would tell the way of life of the yakuza. Nagoshi initially struggled to greenlight the project. Portrayals of the Japanese underworld were common in manga and movies, but not in video games. Nagoshi brought his story for Yakuza to scenario supervisor Hase Seishu two years before the game started development. Seishu had been a video game player since the days of Space Invaders, but over the past four or five years he had lost interest, as he was less concerned with 3D visuals and gameplay than he was with story. Yakuza caught his attention though, and he decided to accept the project even though it came at the busiest point of his professional writing career. Nagoshi chose the focus on yakuzas due to the amount of violence the subject tends to incorporate. This was also done in order to attract more gamers with this theme, believing there were less gamers during the time the game was made. The PlayStation 3 installments' realistic character design is based on Cyberware 3D scanner, Softimage XSI 6.5 3D models and Sega's Magical V-Engine.

Scenario editor Hasei Seishu assisted with the conception of Kiryu and Date in order to make them fit into the narrative. By Yakuza 4, Kiryu was seen as "indestructible" by the staff, and as a result, he was made the last character playable in the game, following three new characters that stood out thanks to their different traits. Yakuza 4 adjusted several of these localisation changes, following criticism of the previous games, and in particular the content excised from the Western release of Yakuza 3. Producer Noguchi noted that there was an attempt to "bring a more complete localization that was more faithful to the source material". This included reversing several name changes. In addition, some conventions were changed; in previous Western localisations, protagonist Kazuma Kiryu had been referred to primarily by his given name. In Yakuza 4, he is referred to primarily by his family name, Kiryu, which more closely reflects the original dialogue.

Many characters of the Yakuza series have had their faces modeled and mapped after their Japanese voice actors since the 2008 spinoff Ryū ga Gotoku Kenzan!. Cyberware Inc.'s head & face color 3D scanner is used in Hollywood's film industry and was exploited to reduce 3D model production time. Yu Suzuki introduced 3D scanning technology back in 1998 for Project Berkeley / Shenmue.

Since Yakuza 6: The Song of Life concludes the story arc of recurring series protagonist Kazuma Kiryu, the franchise's developers Ryu Ga Gotoku Studio wanted to create a new lead character to continue the narrative of the fictional universe they have created, with chief producer and writer Masayoshi Yokoyama describing Ichiban Kasuga as a "catalyst" for change. Ichiban is described by Yokoyama as the opposite of Kiryu: "Ichiban is thoroughly uncomplicated, direct, cheerful, reckless. Well, he's a "fool", isn't he." As a result, he marks a major contrast with the game's dark setting. Auditions of the character started early in development to appreciate him sooner. Kazuhiro Nakaya was one of the multiple candidates to be seen. Yokoyama felt that Nakaya stood out to the character due to sharing a rebellious personality when the script was sent. After a discussion between Yokoyama and Nagoshi, Nakaya was chosen for the role. Nakaya described Ichiban as an energetic and vivid character when reading the script. The character's fascination with Dragon Quest serves as the reason for the series' change from action adventure to role-playing games. Tang describes him as a "whimsical" character who despite being the game's protagonist, he also serves the role of a supporting character due to how he often assists his allies.

== Player characters ==
=== Kazuma Kiryu ===
Voiced by: Takaya Kuroda (Japanese); Darryl Kurylo (Yakuza, Yakuza: Like a Dragon), Yong Yea (Like a Dragon Gaiden: The Man Who Erased His Name onwards), Aleks Le (Like a Dragon: Yakuza) (English)
Portrayed by: Masakatsu Funaki (Like a Dragon: Prologue), Kazuki Kitamura (Like a Dragon), Eiji Takigawa (stage play), Ryoma Takeuchi (Like a Dragon: Yakuza), Yasukaze Motomiya (Ryu ga Gotoku x Nihon Touitsu)
Introduced in: Yakuza

Kazuma Kiryu (桐生 一馬, Kiryū Kazuma) is the main protagonist in the series. Born on June 17, 1968, he was raised during the 1970s in the Sunflower Orphanage with Akira "Nishiki" Nishikiyama, who became his best friend, the latter's sister Yuko and Yumi Sawamura who joined in 1980. When he was a child, his parents were killed by Shintaro Kazama, a Tojo Clan affiliate Dojima Family lieutenant, who brought him to the Sunflower orphanage which he himself financed. In 1986, Kazama introduced Kiryu and Nishiki in the Dojima and Kazama families respectively. Kazama became a father figure for Kiryu who supported him within the Dojima Family and years later when he was released from prison. Kiryu rose through the Tojo hierarchy and earned the nickname "the Dragon of Dojima" (堂島の龍, Dōjima no Ryū) because of the dragon tattoo on his back, but the main reason was because he gained the victory fight against Keiji Shibusawa who wanted to be called the Dragon of Dojima in Yakuza 0. He was planning on starting his own subsidiary group until he took the blame for the murder of his boss, Sohei Dojima, to protect his best friend, Nishiki, and was imprisoned for ten years. These events lead into the plot of Yakuza.

=== Goro Majima ===
Voiced by: Hidenari Ugaki (Japanese); Mark Hamill (Yakuza), Matthew Mercer (Yakuza: Like a Dragon onwards) (English)
Portrayed by: Goro Kishitani (Like a Dragon), Shunsuke Kubozuka (stage play), Munetaka Aoki (Like a Dragon: Yakuza)
Introduced in: Yakuza

A lieutenant of the Shimano family and later head of the Majima Family, Goro Majima (真島 吾朗, Majima Gorō) is an acquaintance of Kiryu with a twisted sense of loyalty. His temper and lack of mercy earned him the nickname "the Mad Dog of Shimano". Majima holds a strong rivalry with Kiryu, believing himself the only one who has the right to kill him, but over time becomes one of Kiryu's most stalwart allies. He appears in every mainline Yakuza game and a majority of the spinoff entries. He becomes playable for the first time in Yakuza: Dead Souls, with his first canon playable entry in Yakuza 0 and again in Yakuza Kiwami 2's Majima Saga. He is the protagonist of "Like a Dragon: Pirate Yakuza in Hawaii", where he is the sole playable character.

=== Ichiban Kasuga ===
Voiced by: Kazuhiro Nakaya (Japanese); Kaiji Tang (English)
Introduced in: Ryu ga Gotoku ONLINE

Ichiban Kasuga (春日 一番, Kasuga Ichiban) is the main protagonist of Yakuza: Like a Dragon. The character first appears in the Japan-exclusive mobile game Ryu ga Gotoku ONLINE (Note: Also referred to as Yakuza ONLINE by non-Japanese media) (龍が如く ONLINE, lit. "Like A Dragon ONLINE"). Originally a member of Tojo Clan's Arakawa Family, in 2001 he is asked by the family's patriarch Masumi Arakawa to go to prison for a murder that he did not commit, which he accepts as his way of repaying his patriarch's favor. In 2019, Kasuga is released from prison only to find that the Tojo Clan has collapsed, and nobody remembers him. He goes to confront Arakawa, who shoots him in the chest. Several days later, Kasuga regains consciousness and finds himself in the Yokohama district of Isezaki Ijincho, where he is unwittingly embroiled in a conspiracy involving multiple yakuza families and their connection to Japan's political figures.

=== Shun Akiyama ===
Voiced by: Kōichi Yamadera (Japanese); Stephen Fu (Like a Dragon: Infinite Wealth) (English)
Introduced in: Yakuza 4

Shun Akiyama (秋山 駿, Akiyama Shun) is one of the playable characters introduced in Yakuza 4. A former homeless person, Akiyama owns Sky Finance, a loan company, as well as the hostess club Elise, which he started up using the money he gathered that fell from Millennium Tower in 2005. Once helped out by the yakuza Hiroaki Arai, he looked up to Arai as a potential new leader of Kamurocho who could eventually succeed Kazuma Kiryu. Akiyama was portrayed to be an elite in his 20s, during which time he dated his coworker, Eri, a woman who bears a striking resemblance to Yasuko Saejima (Lily). In 2005, he was framed for stealing from the bank and was fired. All of his remaining money was spent investigating who framed him, and his money eventually ran out without him finding an answer. He was then forced to sleep on the streets until one fateful night, when money appeared to fall from the sky. He gathered up a large amount of money, but it was stolen by a group of thugs. Arai retrieved the money for him, and he used it to set up a business. Akiyama meets a woman named Lily (later revealed to be Yasuko Saejima), who bears a striking resemblance to his ex-fiancée, Eri. Lily requests to borrow money from him. After a series of "tests" he agrees to lend her the money, though he knows he likely will not get it back. This angers Hana, his secretary, and she quits. Kido discovers the secret safe behind the bookcase in Akiyama's office and steals 100 billion yen in cash.

Later in the game, Akiyama uses his own money to lure the men to the Millennium Tower roof, where he fights Arai. He is shot by Munakata at the end, but a thick padding of bills, his last money, stops the bullet and saves his life. Alongside Sky Finance, he runs a hostess club and is considered to be an entrepreneur of some sort.

Akiyama is considered to be quite lazy, often forgetting to clean his office and frequently neglects his duties. He also appears in Yakuza 5, Yakuza 6: The Song of Life and during the events of the spinoff Dead Souls where he teams up with Kiryu, Majima and Ryuji Goda to stop the zombie plague.

=== Taiga Saejima ===
Voiced by: Rikiya Koyama (Japanese); Ron Yuan (Yakuza: Like a Dragon), James Kirkland (Like a Dragon: Pirate Yakuza in Hawaii) (English)
Introduced in: Yakuza 4

Taiga Saejima (冴島 大河, Saejima Taiga) is one of the four playable characters in Yakuza 4, and one of five playable characters in Yakuza 5. A 45-year-old physically imposing former yakuza who was sentenced to death for having killed 18 members of the Ueno Seiwa Clan by himself in 1985. His tattoo is a tiger, a pun on his name. After serving 25 years, a few days before his scheduled execution, he is suddenly transferred to a secret prison off the coast of Okinawa, where he meets Goh Hamazaki, who persuades him to break out together. He agrees and manages to escape, falling into the sea. Some time later, he washes up on the beach at Morning Glory Orphanage, where he is found by Haruka. Saejima gives his name as "Suzuki" to Haruka and Kiryu, and, after getting tickets and pocket money from Kiryu, heads to Kamurocho. Here he reunites briefly with Majima. Soon after he and Yasuko, his sister, are kidnapped by Katsuragi, where they see each other for the first time in 25 years. Here Katsuragi explains that Saejima did not kill the men; the real culprit is Katsuragi himself. The rounds Saejima used were rubber bullets, and the targets survived Saejima's attack, instead being briefly knocked unconscious. After Saejima left, Katsuragi returned and shot them all in the head, framing Saejima for the crime. Kido shoots Katsuragi and Saejima warns Kiryu and Yasuko of the bulletproof vest he is wearing, but the warning comes too late, and Yasuko is fatally shot protecting Taiga. Taiga later fights Kido on top of the Millennium Tower. After serving out an additional 5-year sentence for assaulting the 18 Ueno Seiwa members, and the events of Yakuza 6 he officially becomes part of the Tojo again until its collapse in 2019. Although he did not make an appearance in Yakuza: Dead Souls, his name was mentioned by one of the Tojo Clan members stating that he was in China on business during the events that took place in Kamurocho.

When Saejima was younger, he and his sister decided to run away from their caretakers and live on their own, as they felt they were imposing on them. One day, however, Yasuko got sick, and the doctors told them that she needed a kidney transplant. Yasuko had a rare blood type, and since she and Saejima were stepsiblings, their kidneys were not compatible. Saejima had to look for Yasuko's biological father, who was actually a high-ranked yakuza. Yasuko's father demanded compensation in exchange for his kidney, 30 million yen. With no way to easily obtain the money, Saejima took to street fights to scrape up whatever money he could. On one such occasion, he decided to pick a fight with a middle-aged man. The man easily defeated Saejima, then asked Saejima why he was sad. Saejima then poured his heart to the man, who turned out to be Hideki Sasai. Sasai agreed to pay the 30-million-yen Saejima needed. In exchange, Saejima had to become a member of the Sasai Family.

=== Masayoshi Tanimura ===
Voiced by: Hiroki Narimiya (2010), Toshiki Masuda (2019)
Introduced in: Yakuza 4

A 29-year-old policeman of the Japanese National Police, Masayoshi Tanimura (谷村 正義, Tanimura Masayoshi) is one of the last playable characters introduced in Yakuza 4, known as "The Parasite of Kamurocho" for his corruption and love of gambling. At heart, however, he is actually just and caring, using the money he wins to finance the raising of orphaned Asian children. He is also fluent in several Asian languages, able to speak Chinese, Korean and Tagalog alongside his native Japanese, and it is revealed in a sub-story that his mother was half-Thai. In secrecy, he is also tracking Saejima's murder case 25 years ago, a case that his father, also an inspector, died following. He goes to meet Mishima, a Ueno Seiwa-kai member to give him protection, but Mishima is shot and killed by Junji Sugiuchi. After being cornered by Sudo, Sugiuchi flees to the water and attempts to escape by speedboat but is pursued by Tanimura. Tanimura attempts to handcuff him but Sugiuchi escapes and the two fight. A defeated Sugiuchi reveals he knows what happened the day of the murder and that it was he who killed his father, though he was not a police officer, but really a yakuza. He is quickly shot by a mystery man on a speedboat (who turns out to be Hisai). Later, Tanimura defeats Munakata and his SWAT-uniformed squad (total 10 of them) on top of the Millennium Tower. After the events of the game he works with Date, who rejoins the force.

=== Tatsuo Shinada ===
Voiced by: Toshiyuki Morikawa
Introduced in: Yakuza 5

Tatsuo Shinada (品田 辰雄, Shinada Tatsuo) is one of the five playable characters in Yakuza 5. He had a promising career in the major leagues, but it was cut short in 1997 when he was set up and received a lifetime ban for a baseball gambling/game fixing scandal he didn't commit. Since then, Shinada earns a meager living as an adult entertainment writer in Nagoya's Kineicho district. But his life takes a turn when a disguised Daigo Dojima confronts Shinada and tells him to uncover the truth behind his ban and clear his name.

=== Haruka Sawamura ===
Voiced by: Rie Kugimiya (Japanese); Debi Derryberry (Yakuza), Xanthe Huynh (Like a Dragon Gaiden: The Man Who Erased His Name onwards) (English)
Portrayed by: Natsuo (Like a Dragon), Ran Sakai (stage play)
Introduced in: Yakuza

Haruka Sawamura (Japanese: 澤村 遥, Hepburn: Sawamura Haruka) is a fictional character from the series Yakuza. Introduced in Yakuza, Haruka was born to Yumi Sawamura and politician Kyohei Jingu in 1996, and grew up in the Sunflower Orphanage where Kiryu, Nishiki and Yumi grew up in. During the events of Yakuza, Haruka is looking for her missing mother. Kiryu finds her and protects her from multiple yakuza outfits from the Tojo Clan and Omi Alliance who are seeking her as she is the key to finding the missing 10 billion yen. After her mother's death at the hands of Jingu, Kiryu adopts her, and the two eventually start the Morning Glory Orphanage in Okinawa in 2007. Across the series, Haruka grows up alongside her adoptive father, debuting as a playable character in Yakuza 5 working as an idol, and starting her own family in Yakuza 6.

=== Joongi Han ===
Voiced by: Yuichi Nakamura (Japanese); Keong Sim (English); Ji-woon Lee (The Korean-speaking part of the Japanese version of Yakuza 7)
Introduced in: Yakuza 6: The Song of Life

Several characters who bear the name and likeness of Joongi Han (ハン・ジュンギ, Han Joongi) (Note: The character's name was initially localized in English as Joon-gi Han, then corrected from Like a Dragon: Infinite Wealth onward.) appear in the series. In Yakuza 6: The Song of Life, Joongi Han is the leader of the resurgent Korean criminal group Jingweon Mafia who has acquired the host bar Stardust as his base of operations. He is presented as an antagonist who clashes with Kazuma Kiryu on multiple occasions and is assassinated by an unidentified hitman shortly after his final fight with Kiryu.

A former body double to Joongi Han from The Song of Life appears in Like a Dragon as a member of the Geomijul, a splinter group to the Jingweon Mafia operating out of Isezaki Ijincho. He is the strategist and second-in-command of Seonhee, the Geomijul leader, who joins Ichiban Kasuga's group following a period of upheaval within Isezaki Ijincho's criminal underworld.

A third incarnation of Joongi Han appears in Ryu ga Gotoku ONLINE as a major character.

=== Koichi Adachi ===
Voiced by: Akio Ōtsuka (Japanese); Andrew Morgado (English)
Introduced in: Yakuza: Like a Dragon

Koichi Adachi (足立 宏一, Adachi Kōichi) is one of Ichiban Kasuga's companions in Yakuza: Like a Dragon. Adachi is a former police detective who is demoted prior to the events of Like a Dragon. Suspecting that the Arakawa Family is involved in corruption within the Tokyo Metropolitan Police and that Ichiban's imprisonment is part of a criminal conspiracy, Adachi meets the latter on the day of his release in an attempt to persuade him to cooperate with his unilateral investigation into the Arakawa Family's activities. He is fired from the police force after Ichiban is shot by Masumi Arakawa but reunites with him in Isezaki Ijincho and starts a new life there.

=== Yu Nanba ===
Voiced by: Ken Yasuda (Japanese); Greg Chun (English)
Introduced in: Yakuza: Like a Dragon

Yu Nanba (難波 悠, Nanba Yū) is one of Ichiban Kasuga's companions in Yakuza: Like a Dragon. Nanba is a disbarred nurse who lives as a homeless man in Isezaki Ijincho. He uses his skills as a former health professional to nurse Ichiban back to health after the latter is dumped in the district's homeless area. Nanba later discloses that he deliberately chooses to live as a homeless person in Yokohama as part of his attempt to investigate his brother's mysterious disappearance.

=== Saeko Mukoda ===
Voiced by: Sumire Uesaka (Japanese); Elizabeth Maxwell (English)
Introduced in: Yakuza: Like a Dragon

Saeko Mukoda (向田 紗栄子, Mukōda Saeko) is one of Ichiban Kasuga's companions in Yakuza: Like a Dragon. An employee of the soapland proprietor Nonomiya who runs a hostess bar he owns as its mama-san, she joins Ichiban's group to help with their investigation into the suspicious circumstances behind his apparent suicide.

=== Tianyou Zhao ===
Voiced by: Nobuhiko Okamoto (Japanese); Robbie Daymond (English)
Introduced in: Yakuza: Like a Dragon

Tianyou Zhao (趙 天佑, Zhao Tianyou) is the leader of the Yokohama Liumang, the city's Chinese Japanese criminal group, and the proprietor of a Chinese restaurant in Isezaki Ijincho's Chinatown. Following a failed coup d'état by his lieutenant Akira Mabuchi, he joins Ichiban Kasuga's group in Yakuza: Like a Dragon.

Zhao makes a non-speaking cameo appearance in the 2021 title Lost Judgment.

=== Eri Kamataki ===
Voiced by: Herself (Japanese); Eden Riegel (English)
Introduced in: Yakuza: Like a Dragon

Eri Kamataki (鎌滝 えり, Kamataki Eri) is the chief executive officer of Ichiban Confections who recruits Ichiban to assist her in managing her troubled company in Yakuza: Like a Dragon. She is modeled on and named exactly after her Japanese voice actress. Eri is available as an optional player character in Ichiban's party once the first milestone objective within the business management minigame is reached.

=== Seonhee ===
Voiced by: Hana Takeda (Japanese); Fiona Rene (English)
Introduced in: Yakuza: Like a Dragon

Seonhee (ソンヒ, Sonhi) (Note: The character's name was initially localized in English as Seong-hui, then corrected from Like a Dragon: Infinite Wealth onward.) is the leader of the Korean syndicate Geomijul, who operates primarily in Isezaki Ijincho, Yokohama. She is initially introduced as an antagonist in Yakuza: Like a Dragon, but following several encounters with Ichiban Kasuga and his friends, she becomes more cooperative. Following Tianyou Zhao joining Kasuga's group, Seonhee is bequeathed the title of leadership of Zhao's own gang, the Yokohama Liumang.

In Like a Dragon: Infinite Wealth, Seonhee joins Kazuma Kiryu's party as a playable ally.

=== Eric Tomizawa ===
Voiced by: Satoru Iguchi (Japanese); Matthew Yang King (English)
Introduced in: Like a Dragon: Infinite Wealth

Eric Tomizawa (エリック・トミザワ, Erikku Tomizawa) is a Hawaiian taxi driver and a member of the Yamai Syndicate. Tomizawa first appears as a hostile enemy to Ichiban Kasuga, and attempts to rob him, but fails. He later is joined by members of the Yamai Syndicate, but is later persuaded by Kasuga to ditch the group as he is mistreated by their leader, Yutaka Yamai. It is later revealed that Tomizawa holds a grudge against one of the Hawaiian crime lords, Dwight Mendéz, for causing him to go to prison and losing his wife who had a miscarriage. Tomizawa later joins Kasuga's group and becomes a playable ally in his party.

=== Chitose Fujinomiya ===
Voiced by: Anju Inami (Japanese); Suzie Yeung (English)
Introduced in: Like a Dragon: Infinite Wealth

Chitose Fujinomiya (不二宮 千歳, Fujinomiya Chitose) is the heiress to the Fujinomiya Group, a wealthy corporation. She goes to Hawaii initially to study abroad, and works for a woman named Akane Kishida as a housemaid. Chitose first encounters Ichiban Kasuga at Akane's home, where she drugs the latter and steals his clothes and belongings, leaving him stranded and later arrested in public. Later, Chitose encounters Kasuga, joined by Kazuma Kiryu and Eric Tomizawa, in District 5 and decides to ally with them as they share the same goal.

It is later revealed that Chitose secretly runs a VTuber account named Hisoka Tatara, and she was responsible for exposing various yakuza's past lives, ruining their chance at finding a career following the Great Dissolution. She did so while being coerced by Eiji Mitamura, but later reconciled with Kasuga and his friends, and later she used the same account to expose the actions of the criminals in Hawaii.

=== Yoshitaka Mine ===
Voiced by: Nakamura Shidō II (Japanese); Daman Mills (English)
Introduced in: Yakuza 3

Yoshitaka Mine (峯 義孝, Mine Yoshitaka) is the 34-year-old President of the Hakuho Clan (白峯会, Hakuhō-kai), a Tojo Clan affiliate, and serves as one of the main antagonists (as well as the final boss) in Yakuza 3. He is also a playable protagonist in Dark Ties, a prequel story to Yakuza 3 that was bundled with its remake, Yakuza Kiwami 3.

Mine was solely raised by his father who later died of an unknown illness. Before his father died, on his deathbed he advised Mine that because of his high intelligence he should make something of himself and that he was sorry to leave him alone. In adulthood, he became a very successful Japanese businessman; he had all the money he wanted and could have any woman he desired. However, after his company voted him out of his own board of directors, Mine felt he was ultimately betrayed, and that people only idolized him for his wealth. Following that incident, Mine witnessed a shootout between rival yakuza gangs, including members of the Tojo Clan trying to protect their chairman Daigo Dojima. He sought to join the clan to understand why these men would die for Daigo, and to see whether true bond between men existed. After Daigo saved Mine from a disgruntled former member of the clan, Mine came to admire Daigo and realize that the Tojo Clan was where he belonged.

Throughout the events of Yakuza 3, Mine initially appears supportive of Kiryu, wishing for him to take Daigo's place as clan chairman to ensure the clan would not fall out of line. However, Mine eventually asserts his stance, opposing that of Kiryu, believing that he is unfit for the position, and that Mine would do what it takes to bring the clan to prosper. He works with the black market dealer Andre Richardson in secret, supporting his plan to use the Tojo Clan's political influence and get the National Diet to pass a law, allowing the construction of a tourist resort and military base in Okinawa, which would also benefit the clan. While Daigo remains in a coma, Mine also visits him, though he believes that Daigo should be put out of his misery. Eventually, Kiryu confronts Mine and defeats him after a grueling fight. Richardson and his men arrive, intending to finish off Kiryu, Mine, and a recently-awakened Daigo, but Mine tackles Richardson and jumps off the roof of the hospital, plunging both of them to their deaths.

Unbeknownst to both Kiryu and Daigo, both Mine and Richardson miraculously survived their falls, and Mine was rescued by an agent of the Daidoji faction, who later recruits him as one of their own. Though Mine remains presumed dead in the original ending of Yakuza 3, he appears in the ending of Kiwami 3, preventing Goh Hamazaki from confronting Kiryu and also recruiting Hamazaki for a Daidoji mission.

== Tojo Clan ==
The Tojo Clan or "Tojo Association" (東城会, Tōjō-kai), founded by Makoto Tojo, is the Kanto region's largest yakuza organization within the franchise's universe.

=== Masaru Sera ===
Voiced by: Ryūji Mizuki (original), Toru Okawa (remake) (Japanese); Alan Dale (Yakuza), Nobi Nakanishi (Yakuza 0: Director's Cut) (English)
Portrayed by: Kōichi Satō (Like a Dragon: Yakuza)
Introduced in: Yakuza

Masaru Sera (世良 勝) is the third chairman of the Tojo Clan. He headed up all the affiliate families that made up the Tojo Clan. He first served as the head of his own yakuza group called the Nikkyo Consortium until 1989 when he was promoted to Tojo Clan Captain for his acquisition of the Empty Lot. He was regarded as a legend for achieving the position of chairman in his 40s and under his leadership from 1993 to 2005, the Clan prospered. In the first Yakuza, Nishiki calls an emergency meeting of all the captains of the Tojo Clan where he revealed that the 10 billion yen that the Clan had gained over the years had been stolen. Sera went to investigate what had happened to the money but was assassinated when he found out what happened. The chairmanship was left open as a result, and the top captains - Kazama, Shimano, and Nishiki - all fought for the position.

It was later revealed that the 10 billion yen actually belonged to Kyohei Jingu who used the Tojo Clan to launder money, and Sera worked together with Shintaro Kazama and Yumi Sawamura to steal the money from Jingu and prepared a will entrusting the decision of who became the 4th Chairman of the Tojo Clan to Kazama. He later entrusted it to Kiryu, which allowed Kiryu to become the 4th Chairman.

Sera also appears in Yakuza 0 as a supporting character, which details his eventual rise as a dominant figure within the Tojo Clan.

=== Dojima Family ===
==== Sohei Dojima ====
Voiced by: Hisao Egawa (Japanese); Imari Williams (Yakuza 0: Director's Cut), Kaiji Tang (Like a Dragon: Yakuza) (English)
Portrayed by: Harumi Sone (Like a Dragon: Prologue), Masaya Kato (Like a Dragon: Yakuza)
Introduced in: Yakuza

Sohei Dojima (堂島 宗兵, Dōjima Sōhei) was the cunning but violent head of the Dojima Family. Dojima was known for getting his way by any means necessary. He is Daigo's father, and Yayoi's husband. His death at the hands of Akira Nishikiyama in 1995 caused Shintaro Kazama, the Dojima captain, to absorb the Dojima men into his own Kazama Family. Kazuma Kiryu covered up Nishiki's murder and served 10 years in prison.

It is revealed in a flashback during Yakuza 2 by Kashiwagi that he was behind the Jingweon mafia massacre in 1980, ordering Kazama and Futoshi Shimano to kill all 46 members of the mafia. He appears again in Yakuza 0 where he and his family lieutenants fought against Kiryu, Goro Majima, Masaru Sera, and Tachibana Real Estate to acquire the Empty Lot, but failed to do so as Sera secured the lot with both Kiryu and Majima's help.

==== Yayoi Dojima ====
Voiced by: Orine Fukushima
Introduced in: Yakuza

Yayoi Dojima (堂島 弥生, Dōjima Yayoi) is married to Sohei Dojima and the mother of Daigo Dojima. In the events of Yakuza 2, she becomes the acting Chairwoman of the Tojo Clan because of the murder of fifth chairman Yukio Terada, and she asks Kiryu to negotiate with the Chairman of the Omi Alliance, Jin Goda, for a truce. Later, she is taken prisoner by Koji Shindo, the second chairman of the Nishikiyama Family, who plans to sell out the Tojo Clan to the Omi and take Yayoi as his lover. However, she defies him and is saved by Kiryu and her son Daigo, the latter of whom kills Shindo.

==== Daigo Dojima ====
Voiced by: Satoshi Tokushige (Japanese); Roger Craig Smith (Yakuza: Like a Dragon, Yakuza Kiwami 3 & Dark Ties), Tim Friedlander (Like a Dragon Gaiden: The Man Who Erased His Name, Like a Dragon: Infinite Wealth) (English)
Introduced in: Yakuza 2

Daigo Dojima (堂島 大吾, Dōjima Daigo) is Sohei and Yayoi Dojima's son. He holds a deep respect for Kiryu, and in Yakuza 2, accompanies him to Kansai to settle a score with Ryuji Goda, the patriarch of the Omi Alliance's Go-Ryu Clan and the man who sent him to prison for 5 years as part of a set-up. He and Chairman Jin Goda of the Omi Alliance are kidnapped by the Jingweon Mafia, but eventually is rescued by Kiryu and Kaoru Sayama. He then takes on a leadership role and brings the fragments of the Tojo Clan together, to lead them into Kamurocho to stop the Jingweon and the Go-Ryu from destroying the city.

Prior to the events of Yakuza 3, Daigo becomes the sixth chairman of the Tojo Clan. At the start of the game, he is shot by CIA operative Joji Kazama, the brother of the late Shintaro Kazama. His fate is left uncertain until Kashiwagi reveals that he has stashed him in a hospital to recover but has not told anyone of Daigo's whereabouts. Mine Yoshitaka of the Hakuho Clan eventually finds his way to the hospital (as does Kiryu) and prepares to kill Daigo out of compassion as he holds too much respect to see him living off a hospital machine. Daigo awakens after Mine's defeat and saves the two from Black Monday syndicate leader Andre Richardson.

During Yakuza 4, Daigo holds an emergency meeting with the Ueno Seiwa Clan following Ihara's death. Isao Katsuragi, the head of the Ueno Seiwa, demanded from Daigo that, to make up for Ihara's murder, the life of Arai or control of the business Majima runs, but Daigo refused. He was then asked by Katsuragi to use Majima instead since he is the "only one to measure up Ihara's murder."

Katsuragi then leaves and tells Daigo to decide what he should do. It was later revealed by Majima that he told Kiryu that Daigo set him up by giving him away to the police. Later Daigo is fought and defeated by Kiryu on top of the Millennium Tower.

Daigo also appears in Yakuza 0, Yakuza 5, Yakuza: Dead Souls, Yakuza 6: The Song of Life and Yakuza: Like a Dragon.

==== Hiroki Awano ====
Voiced by: Riki Takeuchi (Japanese); Eliah Mountjoy (English)
Introduced in: Yakuza 0

Hiroki Awano (阿波野 大樹, Awano Hiroki), is one of the three lieutenants of the Dojima Family, and the patriarch of its subsidiary family, the Taihei Association.

=== Kazama Family ===
==== Shintaro Kazama ====
Voiced by: Tetsuya Watari (Japanese); Roger L. Jackson (Yakuza), Paul Nakauchi (Like a Dragon: Yakuza, Yakuza 0: Director's Cut) (English)
Portrayed by: Hirotaro Honda (Like a Dragon: Prologue), Sansei Shiomi (Like a Dragon), Toshiaki Karasawa (Like a Dragon: Yakuza)
Introduced in: Yakuza

Shintaro Kazama (風間 新太郎, Kazama Shintarō) (known as Fuma in the English versions of the first three games and by his original name Shintaro Kazama from Yakuza 4 onward) was the head of the Kazama Family who had provided funding for the Sunflower Orphanage that Kazuma Kiryu, Akira Nishikiyama (aka "Nishiki"), and Yumi Sawamura grew up in. In 1986, as Captain of the Dojima Family, Kazama inducted both Kiryu and Nishiki as his protégés, with Kiryu joining the Dojima Family proper and Nishikiyama joining the Kazama Family. Kazama remained a father-figure to both of them during their time in the yakuza.

After patriarch Sohei Dojima's murder at the hands of Nishiki in 1995, Shintaro absorbed the remains of the Dojima Family, thus making his Kazama Family the most powerful in the Tojo Clan. This advantage helped keep the other affiliate captains in check. However, a year after the murder, a rift was created in the Kazama Family when Nishiki broke away and declared his own family. This caused many of Kazama's men to desert him and join the rival family. Kazama helped inform Kiryu about the current state of affairs when he was released from prison. At Masaru Sera's funeral, Kiryu meets with Kazama, but the latter is shot by Nishiki. Shinji Tanaka, Kiryu's former partner who is working undercover as Nishiki's lieutenant under orders from Kazama, takes him to a hospital to recover. At some point, Shinji turns Kazama over to Yukio Terada, a lieutenant of the Omi Alliance who is indebted to the latter. Kazama is kept on Terada's yacht until Kiryu can meet him. Futoshi Shimano then attacks the yacht but is defeated by the Kazama Family's reinforcements. Kazama is killed while protecting Haruka Sawamura from a grenade thrown by Shimano, who is then killed by Terada. Shortly before he dies, Kazama admits that he was the one who killed Kiryu's parents and that the Sunflower Orphanage is where he sends the children of the people he kills, making them into orphans. Despite this, Kiryu forgives Kazama and calls him his true father.

In Yakuza 2, it is revealed Kazama participated in the 1980 massacre of the Jingweon mafia in at Sohei Dojima's behest, which he agreed to after much reluctance. During a flashback sequence, it is shown that Kazama, unwilling to kill the Jingweon boss, attempted to strike a deal and told them that if they would leave town, he would spare their lives. However, a 12-year-old Kazuma Kiryu, thinking Kazama was in danger, ran into the room with a pipe with intent to attack the Jingweon boss. Thinking he had been double-crossed, the boss attempts to shoot Kiryu, prompting Kazama to shoot. This began the massacre. In Yakuza 3, a man who resembles Kazama is involved in a situation where Daigo Dojima is shot. This is later revealed to be his younger brother, Joji Kazama, who is an operative for the CIA.

==== Osamu Kashiwagi ====
Voiced by: Shunsuke Sakuya (Japanese); John DiMaggio (Yakuza), David Hayter (Yakuza: Like a Dragon onwards) (English)
Introduced in: Yakuza

Osamu Kashiwagi (柏木 修, Kashiwagi Osamu) is the second-in-command of the Kazama Family who holds a deep respect for his patriarch, Shintaro Kazama. He is seen at the beginning of Yakuza trying to tell a tale about his boss but is silenced by Kazama. Kashiwagi is not seen again until end of Chapter 12, when he arrives with backup to the final confrontation against Futoshi Shimano, ending with the deaths of both Shimano and Kazama.

Prior to Yakuza 2, Kashiwagi becomes the patriarch of the Kazama Family following Kazama's death. He is also the acting Captain of the Tojo Clan. He appears throughout the game, cooperating with Kiryu, Daigo Dojima, and Kaoru Sayama to solve the problems of the Tojo Clan and stop the Go-Ryu Clan and Jingweon Mafia.

In Yakuza 3, Kiryu visits Kashiwagi at the Kazama Family office in the Millennium Tower, but Kashiwagi is gunned down by a helicopter, putting him into a coma for a decade. Before falling unconscious, he tells Kiryu to find the man in the picture, who is the spitting image of Kazama (later revealed to be his brother, Joji Kazama of the CIA). In the events of Yakuza: Like a Dragon, he awakens from his coma and opened up his own bar in Yokohama called Survive Bar to remind himself of how he miraculously survived that day.

Kashiwagi also appears in Yakuza 0, and he provides assistance to Kiryu and Nishiki during the final battle of the game, where Kiryu is fending off Keiji Shibusawa to protect Makoto Makimura, the owner of the sought after Empty Lot.

=== Nishikiyama Family ===
==== Akira Nishikiyama ====
Voiced by: Kazuhiro Nakaya (Japanese); Michael Rosenbaum (Yakuza), Johnny Yong Bosch (Like a Dragon: Yakuza), Kaiji Tang (Yakuza 0: Director's Cut) (English)
Portrayed by: Mikio Ohosawa (Like a Dragon: Prologue), Claude Maki (Like a Dragon), Gaku Sano (stage play), Kento Kaku (Like a Dragon: Yakuza)
Introduced in: Yakuza

Akira "Nishiki" Nishkiyama (錦山 彰, Nishikiyama Akira) was born on October 8, 1968, known as simply "Akira Nishiki" in English versions of the first two games and by his original name in Yakuza 4. He is the former best friend and sworn brother of Kiryu, and one of the main antagonists of Yakuza.

==== Yuko Nishikiyama ====
Introduced in: Yakuza

Yuko (錦山 優子, Nishikiyama Yūko) was Nishiki's younger sister raised with him, Kazuma Kiryu and Yumi Sawamura in Shintaro Kazama's Sunflower Orphanage. She suffered from a disease which had her periodically going to the hospital since 1984. In 1995, her final possible surgery and reliance on her elder brother is the reason Kazuma Kiryu takes the fall for Sohei Dojima's murder. She dies in 1996, and her death coupled with Nishiki's inferiority complex spiraled his descent into darkness.

==== Shinji Tanaka ====
Voiced by: Takafumi Yamaguchi (Yakuza), Tomokazu Sugita (Yakuza Kiwami) (Japanese); Daniel Capellaro (Yakuza) (English)
Introduced in: Yakuza

Kazuma Kiryu's partner, Shinji Tanaka (田中 シンジ, Tanaka Shinji) looks up to Kiryu and helps him out when he can. He was part of the Dojima Family but joined the Kazama Family after Sohei Dojima's death in 1995. While many of Kiryu's old friends forgot about him while he was in prison, Shinji did not, and he eventually works with Kiryu again after his release from prison. During the events of the first game, Kazama has Shinji work undercover as the Nishikiyama Family lieutenant to find out Nishiki's true intentions. However, his cover is eventually blown and he dies from gunshot wounds inflicted by Arase of the Nishikiyama Family.

Shinji also appears in Yakuza 0 during a side quest.

==== Koji Shindo ====
Voiced by: Tomoyuki Dan
Portrayed by: Shōhei Uno (Like a Dragon: Yakuza)
Introduced in: Yakuza

Initially a lieutenant of the Nishikiyama family in Yakuza, Koji Shindo (新藤 浩二, Shindō Kōji) serves as a boss in Chapter 7.

In Yakuza 2, he becomes the second chairman of the Nishikiyama Family following Nishiki's death. Shindo then betrays the Tojo Clan and holds members hostage, wanting Yayoi Dojima as his lover. When Kiryu defeats Shindo in combat, Shindo attempts to kill Kiryu and Yayoi, but her son, Daigo Dojima, intervenes and kills Shindo.

==== Kazuto Arase ====
Voiced by: Hidenori Takahashi
Introduced in: Yakuza

A cold-hearted yakuza officer who is renowned for his brutality and his high marksmanship, Kazuto Arase (荒瀬 和人, Arase Kazuto) kills Reina and Shinji in Yakuza on the orders of Nishki before being defeated by Kiryu.

In Yakuza 3, it is revealed that he was disowned from the Nishikiyama Family by Shindo for his failure to kill Kiryu. He forms the yakuza assassin group the "Avengers", made up of disowned yakuza, with his ultimate goal to take his revenge on Kiryu and kill him. He fails and disbands the Avengers but swears to have one final showdown with Kiryu in the future.

==== Tsuyoshi Kanda ====
Voiced by: Hiroyuki Miyasako (Japanese); Nick Gligor (English)
Introduced in: Yakuza 3

Tsuyoshi Kanda (神田 強, Kanda Tsuyoshi) is 49 years old, and is the third and final chairman of the Nishikiyama Family in the events of Yakuza 3. He is defeated by Kiryu at a love hotel before being killed by Mine.

==== Hasebe ====
Voiced by: Kazuya Nakai (Japanese); Derek Phillips (English)
Introduced in: Yakuza 3

Hasebe (長谷部) is Kanda's lieutenant. He is noticeable for his dreadlocks and his blue suit with a yellow shirt. He goes to Stardust along with his men to take over the bar. He is defeated by Kazuma Kiryu, and reveals that Osamu Kashiwagi will be assassinated.

=== Shimano Family ===
==== Futoshi Shimano ====
Voiced by: Naomi Kusumi (Japanese); Michael Madsen (Yakuza), Fred Tatasciore (Like a Dragon: Pirate Yakuza in Hawaii, Yakuza 0: Director's Cut) (English)
Introduced in: Yakuza

Futoshi Shimano (嶋野 太, Shimano Futoshi) is the head of the Shimano Family, an affiliate of the Tojo Clan. Much like his former patriarch Sohei Dojima, he has a reputation for his ruthless, violent nature. In the events of Yakuza, he has a brutal grudge against Kiryu for Dojima's death. At Masaru Sera's funeral, Shimano fights Kiryu after the latter is discovered. After Shinji leaves Kazama on Terada's boat, the Shimano Family attacks. After being defeated by Kiryu and the Kazama Family reinforcements, Shimano throws a grenade towards Haruka, which kills Kazama when he saves Haruka's life, shortly before being shot and killed by Terada.

Before the events of Yakuza 0, he expelled Goro Majima from the Shimano Family in 1985. Infuriated with his failure to participate in the raid of the Ueno Seiwa Clan, he orders Majima to be tortured in his private chambers where he endured a year of pain and suffering by Shimano's personal hands. In 1987, Shimano exiles Majima to Sotenbori, and entrusts him to Tsukasa Sagawa, the patriarch of the Omi Alliance's Sagawa Family, who offers him to a chance to rejoin the Tojo Clan if he kills Makoto Makimura. Shimano does not reappear until later in the game after Majima and Sagawa finds and knocks Sera unconscious, and reveals they wanted Makoto alive so she would willingly give Shimano the deed to the Empty Lot due to her feelings for Majima. After Sera secured the Empty Lot, Majima was tasked with killing Shimano for his secret alliance with the Omi, but Shimano demonstrates his loyalty by killing the envoy of the Omi Alliance present for negotiations which spares him of his involvement in the plot to betray the Tojo.

=== Majima Family ===
==== Daisaku Minami ====
Voiced by: Hideo Ishikawa (Japanese); Mark Whitten (English)
Introduced in: Yakuza 4

Minami (南 大作, Minami Daisaku) is a member of the Majima Family. In Yakuza 4 he is first seen arriving at a dance club owned by Akiyama looking for Lily. After trading insults and refusing to leave, he and Akiyama fight in which he is defeated. He then attempts to continue fighting until he is stopped by Majima, who then reveals that he is looking for Lily in order to protect her. He later appears in the Millennium Tower when Taiga Saejima arrives looking for Goro Majima. He then orders members of the Majima Family to attack the intruder and fights Taiga personally after they are defeated in which he is defeated himself. He uses "drunken style" while fighting in which he attacks opponents while intoxicated, which makes him more agile and nimble than he is normally.

=== Arakawa Family ===
==== Masumi Arakawa ====
Voiced by: Kiichi Nakai, Taishi Murata (teen) (Japanese); George Takei, Johnny Yong Bosch (young adult), Zach Aguilar (teen) (English)
Introduced in: Yakuza: Like a Dragon

Masumi Arakawa (荒川 真澄, Arakawa Masumi) In Yakuza: Like a Dragon, he is the first patriarch of the Arakawa Family and the acting captain of the Omi Alliance. In Ryu Ga Gotoku Online, he is the patriarch of the Arakawa Family and the captain of the Omi Alliance.

His long history as a hitman and his reputation as the militant leader of the Arakawa Family earned him the nickname "Arakawa the Assassin" (殺しの荒川, Koroshi no Arakawa). As a yakuza patriarch, Masumi appears as a considerate person towards his underlings, especially Ichiban, whom he treats just like an actual son and able to persuade Ichiban to work better with Sawashiro during his tenure.

==== Masato Arakawa (Ryo Aoki) ====
Voiced by: Kosuke Toriumi (Japanese); Will Yun Lee (English)
Introduced in: Yakuza: Like a Dragon

Ryo Aoki (青木 遼, Aoki Ryō), formerly known as Masato Arakawa (荒川 真斗, Arakawa Masato), is the main antagonist and final boss of Yakuza: Like a Dragon. He is the current governor of Tokyo as well as the founder of the non-profit organization Bleach Japan.

Aoki was born to Ikumi and Jo Sawashiro on December 31, 1976, in the bathroom of a department store. He was locked in coin locker number 0099 at Shinjuku Station as a newborn and abandoned by his parents, who were unable to care for him.

Masumi Arakawa retrieved him, unknowingly believing him to be his child with Akane, who he had instructed to hide their baby in a coin locker in order to keep him safe while the two were being pursued by members of Hikawa Industries. However, it was a cold night, and hypothermia set in before Arakawa was able to take Masato out of the locker and bring him to a hospital, resulting in multiple organ failure.

He was given the name Masato Arakawa and raised as Arakawa's only son. Although he grew up in wealth, he appears to have had an unhappy childhood due to chronic illness, which required him to use a wheelchair from a very young age. He experienced a great deal of shame about this, to the point that he was once in such distress about his inability to walk that he had to be restrained from hitting his legs, a sight that inspired Sawashiro to join the Arakawa Family in order to watch over him. Ichiban Kasuga was tasked with Masato's care sometime after his induction into the Arakawa Family.

==== Jo Sawashiro ====
Voiced by: Shinichi Tsutsumi (Japanese); Brian Bloom (English)
Introduced in: Yakuza: Like a Dragon

Jo Sawashiro (沢城 丈, Sawashiro Jō) is a secondary antagonist in Yakuza: Like a Dragon

In Yakuza: Like a Dragon, he is the former captain and second patriarch of the Arakawa Family, a former lieutenant of the Omi Alliance, and the founder and first chairman of the Tokyo Omi Alliance.

=== Hamazaki Family ===
==== Goh Hamazaki ====
Voiced by: George Takahashi (Yakuza 3), Teruyuki Kagawa (Yakuza Kiwami 3) (Japanese); George Ackles (English)
Introduced in: Yakuza 3

Goh (浜崎 豪, Hamazaki Gō) is the tough leader of the Hamazaki Family (浜崎組, Hamazaki-gumi). A major antagonist in Yakuza 3, he earned the nickname "Emperor of Hama" (ハマの帝王, Hama no Teiō); "Hama" being short for Yokohama, the family's hometown. Although tall and strong, Hamazaki is more tactful and cunning than Kanda, using intimidation, manipulation and business connections to further his ambitions.

With only 10 members in his family, Hamazaki rose to the top ranks of the Tojo Clan after taking over Yokohama from the Japanese branch of the Snake Flower Triad 4 years ago. It is shown that Hamazaki was secretly working with the Snake Flower Triad leader Lau Ka Long, who survived the events of Yakuza, in order to accomplish this.

Interested in the land resort deal, he works with the land minister Suzuki in order to remove the orphanage. With the land in his possession, he plans to create a secret casino for the Triad group.

To stop Kiryu from interfering in his plans to take over the Tojo Clan and claim the Okinawa resort land in his possession, he blackmails Goro Majima to use his family to stop him. When that does not go to plan, he convinces his partner Lau Ka Long and his Triad to invade Kamurocho, though Lau is more than obliged out of revenge against Kiryu. After Lau Ka Long is killed, the Snake Flower Triad HQ in China destroys Goh's Hamazaki Family for allowing their Japanese branch leader to be killed. He then goes into hiding.

In Yakuza 3's ending, he appears again in Theater Square confronting Kazuma. Devoid of the power he once had as a yakuza chairman, Goh tells Kiryu that he is a wanted man and that he would be better off dead than to live in personal shame. Kiryu convinces Goh that it is not too late to mend his ways as long as he is alive, stretching his hand out as a sign of trust. Goh walks towards Kiryu, stabbing him in his abdomen with a knife. With Kiryu dying, Goh mockingly states to Kazuma that his idealism will not amount to anything now that he is near death, and Kiryu responds that he still believes in people and his ideals even if he is dying, as the now-deceased Mine taught him this lesson. Bemused by Kiryu's resolve, he is tackled by Kazuki and Yuya, and forced to the ground as the police sirens wail in the background.

Goh Hamazaki appears again in Yakuza 4, now as a 51-year-old prisoner at the same facility Taiga Saejima is transferred to. After Saejima is beaten, Hamazaki manages to get in to see him and convinces him to join his escape effort. With weapon expert Kamiyama's help, who is also an inmate at the prison, the two manage to get past the guards. While sneaking out, Hamazaki obtains confidential documents pertaining to the Tojo Clan. After a final showdown with prison guard Saito, Hamazaki is shot multiple times. Before he and Saito fall into the sea, he tells Saejima to find a man named Kiryu. Hamazaki washes up on the Sunshine Orphanage's beach in Okinawa sometime later. Haruka, remembering the events of the previous year, refuses to let him near the other children. Kiryu and Hamazaki head into town only to meet up with Yasuko, Saejima's half-sister. The group meets at Tamashiro's abandoned office but are ambushed by Saito and the other guards. Although Saito is defeated, Hamazaki sustains a fatal back wound and dies in hospital. Haruka keeps his body at the orphanage until Kiryu returns so he can be buried.

=== Shibata Family ===
==== Kazuo Shibata ====
Voiced by: Hōchū Ōtsuka
Introduced in: Yakuza 4

Kazuo Shibata (柴田 和夫, Shibata Kazuo) is a chairman of the Tojo Clan-affiliated Shibata Family (柴田組, Shibata-gumi) in Yakuza 4. Carries out yubitsume at Arai's behest. After kidnapping Yasuko Saejima in order to question her about killing his men, he is killed by Arai on Katsuragi's orders. 25 years earlier, he and Katsuragi used each other in conjunction with the Ueno Seiwa Clan shooting incident. He is indirectly responsible for Majima losing his left eye after kidnapping him on Chairman Dojima's orders in order to prevent him from participating in the Ueno raid.

=== Kanemura Enterprises ===
Kanemura Enterprises (金村興業, "Kanemura Kōgyō") is a part of the Tojo Clan, under the Shibata Family's umbrella.

==== Hiroaki Arai ====
Voiced by: Ikki Sawamura
Introduced in: Yakuza 4

Hiroaki Arai (新井 弘明, Arai Hiroaki) is Akiyama's friend and Kido's superior. In Yakuza 4, he is secretly working undercover for Munakata. He is shot during the incident at Elnard. He later appears as Akiyama's final boss on top of the Millennium Tower, where he stops Tanimura from shooting Munakata. It is Arai's gun that Munakata uses to kill himself with.

==== Takeshi Kido ====
Voiced by: Kenta Kiritani
Introduced in: Yakuza 4

Takeshi Kido (城戸 武, Kido Takeshi) looks up to Arai in Yakuza 4. He is abducted by Midorikawa and Hatsushiba Clan men before Akiyama rescues him. His strength impresses Akiyama. Discovers Kanemura's body. He finds Akiyama's secret safe containing 100 billion yen, which he steals to help Arai. He takes the money to Katsuragi, where he is shot (purposely non-fatally) in the stomach by Arai. Saejima's final boss.

=== Hatsushiba Clan ===
The Hatsushiba Clan is a group with its offices located under Theater Square. After it is cleared out by Akiyama, it is used as a hideout.

==== Hatsushiba ====
Introduced in: Yakuza 4

Hatsushiba (初芝) is the Shibata Family-derived Hatsushiba Clan (初芝会) chairman. In Yakuza 4, he orders lieutenant Midorikawa, to attack Sky Finance, stealing the client list and abducting Kido, who is rescued by Akiyama.

=== Sasai Family ===
The Sasai Family (笹井組, Sasai-gumi) was a former group under the Tojo Clan in the 1980s.

==== Hideki Sasai ====
Hideki Sasai (笹井 英樹, Sasai Hideki) is the former boss of the Sasai Family. He disbanded the family immediately after the Yoshiharu Ueno shooting in 1985 and vanished. He was planning on using the assassination to quickly defuse the conflict as a mediator in the conflict but Shibata and Katsuragi found out and this opportunity to annihilate the clan as well as allow Katsuragi certain hopes of succeeding as their Chairnan. He was found by Majima, half-dead, and was taken to Purgatory, but was incapacitated. After Saejima escapes from prison he is reunited with Sasai, who says Saejima's name, which are his first words he spoke in 25 years. Before his descent into dementia, Sasai was an adherent to using the threat of force over wealth to establish a clan's authority. Such values are passed on to Saejima in his substories.

== Omi Alliance ==
The "Omi Alliance" (近江連合, Ōmi Rengō) is a powerful yakuza association based in Osaka.

=== Ryuji Goda ===
Voiced by: Masami Iwasaki
Portrayed by: Sho Jinnai (stage play)
Introduced in: Yakuza 2

Ryuji Goda (郷田 龍司, Gōda Ryūji) is the adopted Korean son of Jin Goda, second chairman of the Go-Ryu, and is known as the "Dragon of Kansai". He dislikes this nickname, because he believes that there should only be one true dragon in Japan; to this end he seeks to defeat Kazuma Kiryu, who appears as his rival in Yakuza 2. Goda stages a coup while Kiryu is in Osaka attempting to broker a peace deal, and kidnaps Jin and Daigo, wanting to start a war between the Tojo Clan and Omi Alliance. It is later revealed that Goda is the son of the Jingweon boss and his wife Suyeon, and that Kaoru Sayama is his half-sister. Due to the massacre of the Jingweon in 1980 by the Tojo Clan's Dojima Family, Goda wants to destroy the town and the Tojo. To do this he works with the Jingweon, though later states he hated doing so. At the climax of the story, the two fight on the top of Kamurocho Hills. After his defeat, and the killing of Jin and Terada, he gets up and charges Takashima with a gun. Goda is shot multiple times before finally shooting Takashima in the head.

In the non-canon spin-off Yakuza: Dead Souls, it is revealed that Goda survived the encounter on Kamurocho Hills, albeit with major injuries to his right arm. After four years of wallowing in his failure, the ongoing zombie apocalypse convinces him to take action, after which he meets an old gunsmith and gets a mechanical Gatling gun arm.

=== Jin Goda ===
Voiced by: Masuo Amada
Portrayed by: Ryudo Uzaki (Like a Dragon: Yakuza)
Introduced in: Yakuza 2

Jin Goda (郷田 仁, Gōda Jin) is the elderly 5th chairman of the Omi Alliance, and adoptive father of Ryuji Goda. However, he has difficulty controlling the organization since it has become too big for him to handle. He is kidnapped by Ryuji in a coup d'état, along with Daigo Dojima, after Kazuma Kiryu attempts to create a peace deal between the Tojo and the Omi. In the final chapter of the game, Jin explains the truth about Ryuji's original family. He took Ryuji in at the request of his real mother Suyeon, wife of the Jingweon boss, and mother of Kaoru Sayama. In the end, he is shot and killed by Ryo Takashima.

=== Yukio Terada ===
Voiced by: Kenji Nomura (Yakuza), Go Shinomiya (Yakuza 2)
Introduced in: Yakuza

Yukio Terada (寺田 行雄, Terada Yukio) is the 5th Chairman of the Tojo Clan, succeeding Kazuma Kiryu. Prior to this he was a friend of Shintaro Kazama before his death, and a member of the Kansai-based Omi Alliance. His assassination in December 2006 started a war between the Tojo Clan and the Omi Alliance, his last wish being peace between the two organizations. In the final chapter of the game, it is revealed that he is a Korean whose real name is Daejin Kim, a survivor of the Jingweon massacre in 1980, and that he faked his death in order to start a war between the Tojo and Omi. He did this in order to avenge the murders of the Jingweon members. He also conspired with Ryo Takashima but is betrayed by him. After Takashima shoots Kaoru and Jin Goda, he reveals that he does not need Terada anymore and shoots him. Terada tells Takashima that he never really trusted him, and that he will never let him get what he wants. His last words to Kiyru are "Trust me:. He then activates the bomb, but the bomb's fuse falls from Terada's body, revealing that he had no intention of detonating it. In the epilogue Haruka can be seen praying at his grave, saying, "Thank you for everything."

=== Ryo Takashima ===
Voiced by: Hiroshi Tachi
Introduced in: Yakuza 2

Ryo Takashima (高島 遼, Takashima Ryō) is the Chief Director of the Omi Alliance. He took over when Yukio Terada had left the organization to become fifth chairman of the Tojo Clan, though he was actually working as Terada's mole in the alliance. Takashima, however, betrays him, intending to take both the Omi and the Jingweon to spread throughout mainland Asia. However, he is killed by Ryuji Goda before his plans can be realized.

=== Toranosuke Sengoku ===
Voiced by: Tadahisa Saizen
Introduced in: Yakuza 2

A flashy and brash lieutenant of the Omi Alliance, Toranosuke Sengoku (千石 虎之介, Sengoku Toranosuke) is one of the Omi's "Four Kings". He sends men into Kamurocho to destroy the Tojo Clan, but they are all defeated single-handedly by Goro Majima. He then kidnaps Haruka to lure Kiryu to him. After Kiryu defeats him, he is killed by Ryuji Goda who is disgusted that he put a child in danger for a shot at killing Kiryu. He is arrogant and incredibly wealthy, owning a castle in Osaka which can split in two, revealing a second castle made of gold filled with samurai and ninjas. Also, inside are two tigers, which he uses in attempt to kill Kiryu (in reference to his given name; the first character, "Tora", means "tiger").

Hiroshi Hayashi

Voiced by: Shun Sugata
Introduced in: Yakuza

Hiroshi Hayashi (林 弘, Hayashi Hiroshi) is a member of the Omi Family working for Akira Nishikiyama to kidnap Haruka Sawamura during the events of Yakuza. Hayashi and his men meet Kazuma Kiryu at Mizuki's bar, Ares, on top of the Millennium Tower. Hayashi corner Kiryu and demands Haruka be handed over. Kiryu resists, defeating them.

In Yakuza 2, he has left the Omi Family and started working for Ryuji Goda and Go-Ryu Clan. Hayashi and seven men are sent to attack the transformer room that serves Kage's new surveillance point in the Millennium Tower. He is once again defeated by Kazuma Kiryu.

=== Tsubasa Kurosawa ===
Voiced by: Eiji Okuda
Introduced in: Yakuza 5

Tsubasa Kurosawa (黒澤 翼) is the seventh chairman of the Omi Alliance, and the main antagonist of Yakuza 5. With most of the characters believing he is an invalid on his deathbed, he is in truth manipulating both the Tojo Clan and Omi Alliance, along with Kiryu Kazama, to destruction.

=== Masaru Watase ===
Voiced by: Rintarō Nishi (Japanese); James C. Burns (English)
Introduced in: Yakuza 5

A hot-headed and vicious yakuza, but with a strong sense of honor, Masaru Watase (渡瀬 勝) is the captain of the Omi Alliance and patriarch of the Watase Family, alongside being one of the leading candidates as the eighth chairman of the Omi Alliance.

=== Naoki Katsuya ===
Voiced by: Mitsuru Fukikoshi
Introduced in: Yakuza 5

Naoki Katsuya (勝矢 直樹) is the head of Osaka Talent, a major entertainment corporation, and Osaka Enterprises, a major front for the Omi Alliance. He is one of the main candidates for becoming eighth chairman.

== Ueno Seiwa Clan ==
Debuting in Yakuza 4, the Ueno Seiwa Clan (上野誠和会) is an organization that was in the midst of a power-struggle with the Tojo Clan in 1985. 18 of its men were gunned down by a single man. Soon after the incident, the organization reconciled with the Tojo Clan.

=== Yoshiharu Ueno ===
Introduced in: Yakuza 4

Yoshiharu Ueno (上野 吉春, Ueno Yoshiharu) is a former chairman of the Ueno Seiwa Clan. After 18 of his men were shot by Saejima, he was the only man other than Katsuragi left alive. Shortly after the incident he promoted Katsuragi to lieutenant for his brave actions that spared Ueno's life, though unbeknownst to Ueno it was Katsuragi who really killed the men. Now elderly and confined to his bed, he puts Katsuragi in charge.

=== Isao Katsuragi ===
Voiced by: Fumihiko Tachiki
Introduced in: Yakuza 4

Isao Katsuragi (葛城 勲, Katsuragi Isao) is a main antagonist for most of Yakuza 4. He is a Ueno Seiwa Clan lieutenant, and one of few survivors of the shooting in 1985. After Ihara, another member of the organization, is killed by Arai of Kanemura Enterprises, Katsuragi complains to Daigo Dojima, sixth chairman of the Tojo Clan. He asks for the rights to Kamurocho Hills as compensation but is refused. Katsuragi is later revealed to be the true culprit in the shooting 25 years before, having conspired with Shibata. Using Taiga Saejima's discarded gun he shot the men, before instructing Sugiuchi to shoot him in the shoulder, so as not to look suspicious. The incident was covered up with help from Sugiuchi and Munakata, who helped to frame Saejima. He kidnaps Yasuko, Saejima's sister, in an attempt to lure Taiga to him. When he arrives, Taiga is also tied up, and when Kazuma Kiryu catches up Kido appears with the 100 billion yen in cases. Kiryu gives him the file containing information about the stolen money and Kido returns Yasuko to him. Katsuragi then orders Kido to shoot her, but he turns and shoots Katsuragi in the chest instead. Kiryu frees Saejima, who warns them that Katsuragi is wearing a bulletproof vest, as on the night of the shooting. Katsuragi shoots at Taiga, hitting him in the arm, before shooting once more; this time Yasuko takes the bullet fatally in the back. Before dying, she takes the gun given to her by Tanimura and shoots Katsuragi in the head, killing him instantly.

=== Junji Sugiuchi ===
Voiced by: Kenichi Endou
Introduced in: Yakuza 4

Junji Sugiuchi (杉内 順次, Sugiuchi Junji) is a detective of the criminal investigation division, and a 30-year veteran who appears in Yakuza 4 who hates yakuza. 25 years before the events of Yakuza 4, he had been investigating the shooting of Yoshiharu Ueno, submitting a false report to Munakata to the director of the criminal investigations department which implicating Saejima as the perpetrator. After being cornered by Sudo and subsequently defeated by Tanmiura following a speedboat chase, he admits that it was he who killed Tanimura's father. He also revealed that he himself had been a member of the Ueno family with Katsuragi, and not a police officer. He is then shot by an unknown man and dies in Tanimura's arms.

=== Yutaka Mishima ===
Voiced by: Takahiro Fujimoto
Introduced in: Yakuza 4

Yutaka Mishima (三島 豊, Mishima Yutaka) is Ihara's underling, with whom he created a disturbance in club Elnard. When Akiyama arrives at the club, Mishima attempts to attack Akiyama after ignoring his warnings, but he is knocked out, and Ihara is forced to fight alone. After his defeat, Mishima is in a room adjacent to the Seiwa Clan's main office and by chance, overhears the phone call announcing Ihara's death. Realizing his life is in danger, Mishima goes into hiding. Tanimura offers to take him into police protection, planning to root out the traitor within the police force. Tanimura meets him in a warehouse near the dock, and as he promises him protection Mishima is shot and killed by Sugiuchi.

== Yomei Alliance ==
Debuting in Yakuza 6: The Song of Life, the Yomei Alliance (陽銘連合会, Yōmei Rengō-kai) is the third largest criminal organisation in Japan. Headquartered in Onomichi, their operations have been largely focused on Hiroshima, with little to no attempt to expand beyond their existing territory. Heavily connected to the Iwami Shipbuilding Company

=== Heizo Iwami ===
Voiced by: Masane Tsukayama

Heizo Iwami (巌見 兵三) is the founder of Iwami Shipbuilding and the chairman of the Yomei Alliance under the alias of Takeru Kurusu (来栖 猛). Building a global shipping company based in Onomichi, Iwami did his best to dissuade his son from entering the criminal underworld. During the war, Iwami was secretly contracted by the military to build the Yamato Mark II. Despite the war ending and the project having no more use, Iwami refused to cancel the project, using the "secret of Onomichi" as political blackmail for all of those involved.

After the Hirose family and Kiryu discover the Yamato Mark II, Iwami first orders Toru Hirose to kill his subordinates, but when Hirose disobeys, Iwami then shoots Hirose himself. Soon after, Tsuneo Iwami reveals that he was fully aware of his father's actions and secrets, and orders Koshimizu to execute him, his death is covered up as a suicide.

=== Tsuneo Iwami ===
Voiced by: Nao Ōmori

Tsuneo Iwami (厳見 恒雄) is the son of Heizo Iwami and the current CEO of Iwami Shipbuilding. The true main antagonist of Yakuza 6 - Iwami orchestrates the conflict between the Tojo clan, the Yomei Alliance, and the Jingweon Mafia through collusion with the Saio Triad and elements of the Tojo clan.

After killing Heizo Iwami, Tsuneo, under orders from Minoru Daidoji, is tasked with putting Kiryu to death. To do this, he orders Someya, under threat of his ex-wife Kiyomi's death, to do his bidding. After the attack on Millenium Tower, Kiryu and the Hirose family meet Iwami again at his father's funeral, finally defeating him.

=== Kanji Koshimizu ===
Voiced by: Ayumi Tanada

Kanji Koshimizu (小清水 寛治), is the captain of the Yomei Alliance and the patriarch of the Koshimizu Family. Koshimizu is ordered by Heizo Iwami to kidnap Haruto, as a way to prevent Tsuneo Iwami from using it to overthrow him. However, Kiryu and Nagumo are able to knock him out in a fight before he could do so.

After Kiryu discovers the secret of Onomichi, Koshimizu sides with Tsuneo and kills Heizo Iwami, with the death framed as a suicide. Under Tsuneo's orders, Koshimizu then kidnaps Kiyomi, in order to force Someya to fight Kiryu. He is next met during the funeral of Heizo Iwami, where he is knocked out by Kiryu and the Hirose Family. After Tsuneo Iwami's arrest, Koshimizu becomes the second chairman of the Yomei Alliance.

=== Koji Masuzoe ===
Voiced by: Wataru Takagi

Koji Masuzoe (舛添 耕治) is the patriarch of the Masuzoe Family. Born a heihaizi, Masuzoe was handed over to the Saio Triad by his parents at a young age. He was raised by the Saio Triad to act as a mole within the Yomei Alliance, and with another mole, Shu Tatsukawa, monitor Big Lo's second son, Yuta Usami. After discovering that Yuta had fathered a child with Haruka Sawamura, Masuzoe attempts to convince Haruka to abort the child, causing her to leave Onomichi. After initially attacking the Hirose Family, his subordinates, for not following his orders, later being ordered to punish them, only to be thwarted by Kiryu.

After the raid on the Saio Triad Headquarters, Masuzoe unveils his true allegiance to Kiryu, attempting to shoot him. He is only stopped by the arrival of Big Lo. Learning that Tatsukawa was killed by the Saio Triad due to him swearing allegiance to Tsuneo Iwami, Masuzoe decides to betray the Saio Triad by revealing the truth, only to be killed by Toru Hirose immediately after for knowing the secret of Onomichi.

=== Hirose Family ===
A subsidiary of the Masuzoe Family. Headquartered in Onomichi, Hiroshima and allies to Kiryu during the events of Yakuza 6

==== Toru Hirose ====
Voiced by: Takeshi Kitano

Toru Hirose (広瀬 徹) was the patriarch of the Hirose Family, shortly after the bombing of Hiroshima, Hirose had started his own gang. After an unsuccessful raid on an Iwami Shipbuilding facility, Hirose was recruited by Heizo Iwami and mentored into becoming one of the organisation's top assassins, in order to protect the secret of Onomichi. After killing the fathers of Tsuyoshi Nagumo and Takaaki Matsunaga, Hirose showed pity by adopting their sons into his family.

After Kiryu discovers the secret of Onomichi, Heizo orders Hirose to execute him and the rest of the Hirose Family. Ultimately, Hirose is unable to do so, and is fatally shot by Heizo.

==== Tsuyoshi Nagumo ====
Voiced by: Hiroyuki Miyasako

Tsuyoshi Nagumo (南雲 剛) is the captain of the Hirose Family. Nagumo becomes a staunch ally of Kiryu, along with the rest of the Hirose Family. During high school, Nagumo, Kiyomi and Ino were classmates, with both Nagumo and Ino developing a crush for Kiyomi. As a result, Nagumo continues to hold unrequited feelings for Kiyomi, becoming heavily distraught when Someya tells him that she is his ex-wife.

Believing Kiryu to be a threat and a rival to Kiyomi's affection when he arrives in Onomichi, he attempts to fight Kiryu multiple times, all inevitably ending in failure. However, after Kiryu stops Masuzoe from threatening Kiyomi's bar for extortion money, Nagumo immediately gains respect for Kiryu, now referring to him as his "aniki".

==== Yuta Usami ====
Voiced by: Tatsuya Fujiwara

Yuta Usami (宇佐美 勇太) is a member of the Hirose Family and the father of Haruto Sawamura. The son of Big Lo and the younger brother of Jimmy Lo, Yuta was raised in secret due to being a heihaizi(黑孩子), a forbidden second child. In a pact between the Saio Triad and the Yomei Alliance, Yuta's Japanese citizenship was forged and he was closely monitored by Saio agents.

When Haruka arrives in Onomichi, she and Yuta quickly begin showing feelings for one another, eventually leading to them briefly dating and Yuta accidentally conceiving a child with her. He is entirely unaware of this fact until Masuzoe informs the Hirose Family. Yuta quickly becomes a close ally of Kiryu, accompanying him to Kamurocho. While there, he learns that he is now the heir to the Saio Triad, with Jimmy Lo having been killed. This in addition to losing Haruto to the Jingweon Mafia causes Yuta to languish in despair, eventually setting fire to the Saio Triad headquarters in a suicide attempt.

After the events of Yakuza 6, Yuta leaves the Hirose Family to help Haruka take care of the children in the Morning Glory Orphanage. He is last seen filming Haruto's first steps.

==== Takaaki Matsunaga ====
Voiced by: Doronzu Ishimoto (Japanese); James C. Burns (English)

Takaaki Matsunaga (松永 孝明) is a senior member of the Hirose Family. A ship enthusiast typically seen building model ships in his free time, he is also the proprietor of the club Moreno in Onomichi.

==== Naoto Tagashira ====
Voiced by: Yoshimasa Hosoya (Japanese); Brent Mukai (English)

Naoto Tagashira (田頭 直人) is a member of the Hirose Family. Notably more technologically adept and quick witted than the other members of the family. Tagashira was capable of solving the secret of Onomichi.

== Snake Flower Triad ==
The Snake Flower Triad (蛇華, Jaka, Lit. "The Snake Flower") is a Chinese criminal gang that appears in the Yakuza series.

They have a branch in Japan led by Lau Ka Long, which appears as an adversarial organization in Yakuza/Yakuza Kiwami and Yakuza 3. The group makes brief appearances in stories Yakuza 2/Yakuza Kiwami 2, Yakuza 6: The Song of Life, and Yakuza: Like a Dragon.

By controlling a sizable portion of Yokohama's underworld in the 1980s, Lau Ka Long established the Snake Flower Triad's influence in Japan. The group forgeried passports and travel documents for unauthorized immigrants while extorting neighborhood businesses for large sums of protection money. In a sizable Chinese eatery in the city, Lau set up the Triad's main office. Snake Flower Triad had rivalry with the Yokohama Liumang, another Chinese group in the city. By the early 1990s, when Snake Flower chose to avoid the Liumang's primary territory in Isezaki Ijincho, the conflict had largely been resolved. After that, the two sides would continue to fight.

=== Lau Ka Long ===
Voiced by: Shinichi Takizawa (Japanese); James Horan (Yakuza) Johnny Yong Bosch (Yakuza: Like a Dragon onward) (English)
Introduced in: Yakuza

Lau Ka Long (ラウ・カーロン, 劉家龍) is a Chinese martial arts master and the President (総統, sōtō) of the Chinese mafia triad called Snake Flower (蛇華, Jaka). In 1993, Lau had Kazuma Kiryu tortured in his private chambers after Lau found out that he and the Dojima Family were trying to muscle in on his passport forgery business. After Lau leaves Kiryu to die, he is rescued by Shintaro Kazama. In 2005, Lau, working for Futoshi Shimano, has Haruka kidnapped. Kazuma confronts Lau and defeats him but is then caught and blamed for Haruka's abduction. Lau Ka Long returns in Yakuza 3 when the Snake Flower Triad invades Kamurocho at Hamazaki's behest. He kidnaps Rikiya as bait to lure Kazuma out and take revenge for his defeat 4 years ago. He is supposedly killed by Joji Kazama when he shoots Lau in the head.

In the events of Yakuza: Like a Dragon, Lau is revealed to have somehow survived being shot in the head and has since been working as an underground weapons dealer in Ijincho under the name Chau Ka Long. Lau can only appear once the gambling hall is unlocked. Once it is, Iroha Yanagi will let Ichiban Kasuga know of the underground dealer and the password required to reach him. Kasuga gets to Zhou Long Distribution and is ambushed after providing the password. Lau then appears and asks to meet Kasuga near Kinka Bridge, having passed his test.

When they meet again, Lau asks Kasuga if he was part of a yakuza family, to which the latter replies that he was part of the Tojo Clan before. Lau muses about how Shintaro Kazama and Kazuma Kiryu were also in the Tojo Clan, and when asked if they were friends, Lau replies that he would rather not be seen by the Tojo again, implying he does not know about the Tojo being severely weakened and driven out prior to their meeting.

After explaining the reasoning for his subordinates fighting him, Lau offers his services to Kasuga, under the condition that he never mentions this to anyone. Once Kasuga builds his confidence up, Lau decides to assist him in battle as a Poundmate, as losing him would be bad for business.

== Tokyo and Osaka Police ==
Junichi Sudo (須藤 純一, Sudō Jun'ichi)

Voiced by: Mitsutaka Tanaka (Yakuza - Yakuza 4), Masato Obara (Yakuza Kiwami - Yakuza Kiwami 3) (Japanese); Skyler Stone (Yakuza), Jamieson Price (Yakuza Kiwami 3) (English)

Chief superintendent of the criminal investigation division. He asks Date to investigate the money-laundering during the missing 10-billion-yen case.

During Yakuza 2, Sudo helps with the investigation of the Jingweon mafia. He pilots a helicopter to evacuate Kiryu and Sayama from the bomb at the end of the game, but due to the lack of time he is forced to retreat from the area.

Sudo only appears at the start of Yakuza 3, where he reveals to Date that the people involved in the Jingweon incident were promoted to keep their mouths shut about Kurahashi infiltrating the police force.

He reappears twice in Yakuza 4. He aids in the cornering of Sugiuchi at the docks but is hesitant to use force to stop him knowing the kind of immunity Sugiuchi possessed. He again flies a helicopter above the Millennium tower after the final battle with Seishiro Munakata, while Date distributes copies of newspapers all over town telling the truth about Munakata.

Jiro Kawara (瓦 次郎, Kawara Jirō)

Voiced by: Susumu Terajima

A hard-boiled veteran detective known as "Killer Kawara", who is on the trail of a Korean crime gang, which is later revealed to be the secretive Jingweon mafia. He was present at the massacre of the Jingweon 25 years ago and saved the boss's wife and son. After taking care of the woman, called Suyeon, he later married and had a child with her. The child is later revealed to be Kaoru Sayama, and this is revealed by Kurahashi, a Jingweon survivor, mere moments before Kawara's death in Kaoru's arms.

Wataru Kurahashi (倉橋 渉, Kurahashi Wataru)

Voiced by: Shun Sugata (Yakuza 2), Houka Kinoshita (Yakuza Kiwami 2)

Wataru Kurahashi is a 42-year-old chief superintendent. Secretly, he was a Korean named Yeongmin Ji and a survivor of the Jingweon mafia massacre 25 years before by the Tojo Clan. Kurahashi took Japanese citizenship and joined the Tokyo Metropolitan Police. Unbeknownst to him, Kawara was watching him the entire time. He, Yukio Terada, and Ryo Takashima plotted to destroy the Tojo. Kurahashi and his men kidnapped Makoto Date to set a trap for Kiryu. Kurahashi reveals to Kaoru Sayama that Kawara is her father after shooting him. Kazuma and Kurahashi fight and Kurahashi is defeated but manages to pick up a gun. He tries to shoot Kaoru, but Kawara uses his body to shield her and takes the bullet before shooting Kurahashi and killing him.

Satoshi Hisai (久井 聡, Hisai Satoshi)

Voiced by: Hideyuki Tanaka

A member of the community safety division in Yakuza 4, who is kind towards Tanimura. He was sent by Munakata to "dipose of" Sugiuchi and Tanimura, but spares Tanimura. After writing a false report to Munakata, lying about having killed both men, and holding Tanimura's adoptive family hostage at their restaurant, he commits suicide.

Seishiro Munakata (宗像 征四郎, Munakata Seishirō)

Voiced by: Kinya Kitaōji

Assistant commissioner in Yakuza 4. He and Sugiuchi covered up the true perpetrator of the case 25 years before, Katsuragi, in which 18 yakuza were killed, letting Taiga Saejima take the blame. He was involved in the missing 10-billion-yen incident five years before and had many secret funds which he used to build illegal prisons and control criminals. Using his influence, he sends Arai undercover as a member of the Tojo Clan. In an attempt to get the 100 billion yen from Kiryu he orders Arai to take the children at Sunshine Orphanage hostage. Rejecting him, Arai shoots Munakata, though the bullet is only plastic. He later appears with the three other men (Arai, Kido and Daigo) on top of the Millennium Tower to claim the money. Tanimura takes him on as the final battle and, after his defeat and Date outing the truth about Munakata, he commits suicide with Arai's discarded gun.

Kaoru Sayama (狭山 薫, Sayama Kaoru)

Voiced by: Yū Daiki (Yakuza 2 – 3); Aya Hisakawa (Yakuza Kiwami 2 onwards) (Japanese) Minae Noji (Like a Dragon: Infinite Wealth onwards) (English)

25-year-old Sayama is a lead detective of the Osakan police. Sayama's work within Division 4 earned her the nickname "the Yakuza Eater". She originally studied programming at college as a way of getting into the police force (as part of their hi-tech crimes division) but requested a transfer as soon as she was established and rose through the ranks quickly, promoted to division lieutenant after only four years in the police. She is initially ordered to take Kiryu into protective custody, during which she can follow the Tojo Clan's activities. During this time, she begins to fall for Kiryu. She believes she may be a Jingweon survivor, but eventually discovers she is really the child of the Jingweon boss's wife and Jiro Kawara, also making her Ryuji's half-sister.

At the start of Yakuza 3, Kaoru Sayama meets Kiryu at the graveyard and tells him that she is leaving Japan to receive training in the United States. While she plays no further role in the game, completing special tasks will prompt a text message from Sayama to come through on Kiryu's phone.

== Central Intelligence Agency (CIA) ==
Joji Kazama (風間 譲二, Kazama Jōji)

Voiced by: Tetsuya Watari (Japanese); Paul Nakauchi (English)

60 years old. He is the younger brother of Shintaro Kazama, founder of the Kazama Family and father figure to Kazuma Kiryu. 30 years ago, Joji was an elite member of the National Police Agency within the Secretariat of the Minister of State's international section. He received persecution because his brother Shintaro was a known yakuza of the Tojo Clan, so Joji had to resign and he eventually joined the CIA, and became a close friend of Tamiya. Due to his near identical looks to those of his dead brother, and Shintaro never having told people of Joji, he is initially presumed to be Shintaro after shooting Daigo and Nakahara. He shoots and kills both Lau Ka Long and Tamashiro.

Andre Richardson (アンドレ・リチャードソン)

Voiced by: Charles Glover (Yakuza 3, Yakuza Kiwami 3), Yusuke Shirooka (Like a Dragon: Infinite Wealth, Like a Dragon: Pirate Yakuza in Hawaii); Fred Tatasciore (Like a Dragon: Infinite Wealth onward) (English)

51 years old. Andre Richardson, a.k.a. the "Man in Black", is first thought to be a CIA agent, but it is later revealed by Mine that he is really the leader of Black Monday, a powerful illegal arms dealing organisation. He falls to his apparent death when Mine jumps off the roof of the hospital holding on to him, after being shot. Years after his presumed death, he opens a bar in Hawaii known as Revolve Bar and operates it as its proprietor, and is only known to Kiryu's group as "The Bartender".

== Politicians ==
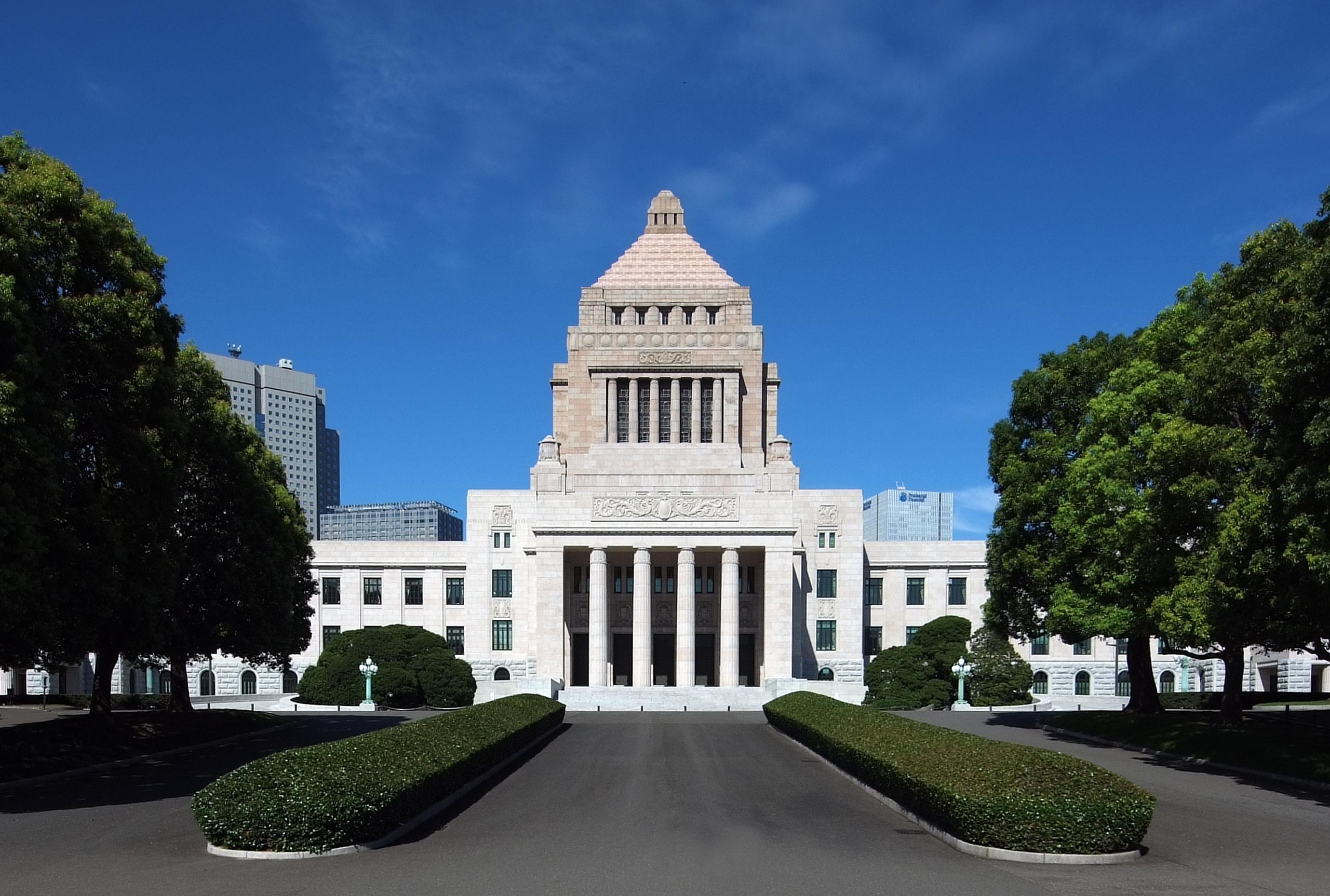
Kiryu Kazuma is invited to the National Diet Building by the Minister of Defense in Yakuza 3.

Kyohei Jingu (神宮 京平, Jingu Kyōhei)

Voiced by: Hiroaki Yoshida (Japanese); Robin Atkin Downes (English)

The mastermind behind the Tojo Clan robbery. He is Haruka's father. He and Yumi met after she lost her memory, following the murder of Sohei Dojima, and the two conceived Haruka. Jingu left Yumi and Haruka when he received a marriage proposal from the Prime Minister's daughter, desperate for power and riches. He ordered the death of a reporter who was threatening to reveal the truth about Yumi and Haruka. He then requested that Sera, then Tojo Clan chairman, hire an assassin to kill Yumi and Haruka. Before the assassin could kill them, Shintaro Kazama arrived and shot the assassin. As a result of this incident, Yumi regained her memory. When Kiryu and Haruka go to Ares to meet Yumi, Jingu and his men are waiting for them. He then shoots Haruka, but Kiryu takes the bullet, shocked that Haruka's own father would shoot her. Jingu explains that Yumi and Haruka are nothing more than a problem for him. Then Yukio Terada, the lieutenant of the Omi Family, arrives and holds Jingu at gunpoint. Jingu laughs and, as the Omi soldiers grab Terada, reveals the Omi Family work for him. Makoto Date appears in a helicopter and orders Jingu's arrest. Jingu's men shot Date's helicopter and ordered every witness to be killed. After Kiryu defeats Jingu, Yumi revealed the safe containing the money. Jingu shot Kiryu twice, but Yumi takes the second (and fatal) bullet. Nishiki then charges Jingu with a knife and stabs him, before setting off the bomb.

=== Democratic Party of Japan ===
Ryuzo Tamiya (田宮 隆造, Tamiya Ryūzo)

Voiced by: Akio Ōtsuka

A member of the ruling Democratic Party of Japan and the Minister of Defense. Tamiya launches a plan to expand an airbase in Okinawa for the purpose of testing a new Ballistic Missile Defense system. Minister Suzuki opposes this plan, submitting a resort proposal instead. The B.M.D. project is actually fake and is part of an anti-criminal plot in conjunction with the CIA against a now Okinawa-based American weapon smuggling organisation called Black Monday. Concerned about the threat to his Private Secretary, now the CIA is after him for disclosing the plot, Tamiya sends Kiryu back to Ryukyu to save the lives of both Toma and his long-time friend, Joji Kazama.

Yoshinobu Suzuki (鈴木 善伸, Suzuki Yoshinobu)

Suzuki is the Minister of Land (DPJ) who opposes Tamiya's B.M.D. project, promoting his own Okinawan resort development. In order to force the land purchase for his resort plan, Suzuki connects with the Tojo Clan through its affiliated Hakuho Clan, headed by Mine, and the local Tamashiro Family. However, the resort proposal is regarded as a threat by the CIA, for it would cancel the whole Black Monday operation.

Shoyo Toma (當眞 昌洋, Tōma Shōyō)

Toma is the private secretary of Minister Tamiya (DPJ). He lets out the truth behind Tamiya's proposal to thwart the plan, which he believes will harm his beloved Okinawa, not knowing the real reason for the proposal. When the CIA learn Toma betrayed Minister Tamiya for his rival Suzuki, thus threatening the Black Monday project, Joji Kazama is sent to Ryukyu's Canal Grande hostess club to assassinate him. He is stopped by Kiryu.

== Kamurocho inhabitants ==
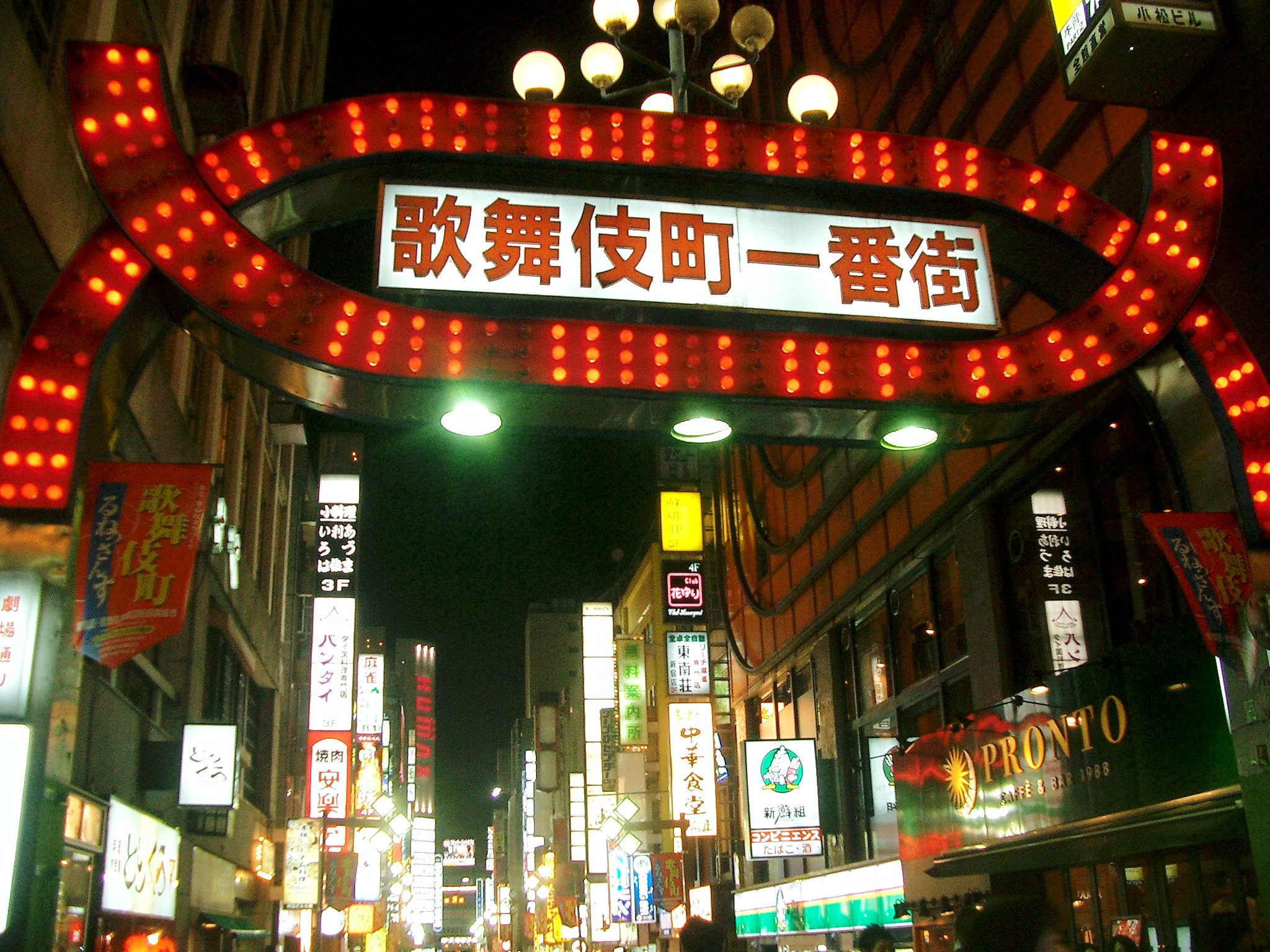
The Kamurocho area is modeled after Tokyo's Kabukicho (歌舞伎町).

=== Kiryu's allies ===
Makoto Date (伊達 真, Date Makoto)

Voiced by: Kazuhiro Yamaji (Japanese); Bill Farmer (English)

Portrayed by: Yutaka Matsushige (Like a Dragon), Subaru Shibutani (Like a Dragon: Yakuza)

Introduced in Yakuza, Detective Makoto Date often frequents Kiryu in regard to conflicts happening in the narrative. After Dojima's murder, 41-year-old Detective Date was the only one not fully convinced of Kiryu's guilt. He continued to investigate the case even after Kiryu's incarceration, which earned him an unwanted transfer to the Organized Crime Unit. He is the father of Saya Date. After Kiryu is arrested, he chooses to forsake his career in the police (justifying it by saying that his time was limited anyway) to spring him from jail. He helps Kiryu throughout the game, becoming one of his closest friends. At the end of the game, he appears with Sudo in a helicopter, trying to arrest Jingu. Eventually they are shot down, but it is later discovered that both Date and Sudo survived the crash. In the end, it is his words that encourage Kiryu to keep going after the deaths of Yumi and Nishiki.

After the events of Yakuza, he chose to retire from the police to live with Saya. However, during Yakuza 2, he is recruited, along with his old mentor Kawara, by Sudo in a secret mission to uncover the truth behind the Jingweon mafia. During a shoot-out with a fake Kazuki, an illegal immigrant who is shot and killed, he is falsely accused as the killer.

Prior to Yakuza 3 Date becomes a reporter and continues to assist Kiryu with information about the Tojo Clan and the incidents. He is shown to have a crush on Mariko, the owner of New Serena, and when she is kidnapped by the same man who killed her first husband, a detective, years before he saves her. Due to the memories of this incident she refuses to enter into a relationship with Date, but by the end of the game suggest that someday she might change her mind.

During Yakuza 4 Date takes care of New Serena for Mariko while she is at home, due to a bereavement in her family, though he continues his activities as a reporter. He also meets Saya's boyfriend, though at first he disapproves of him. After the fight with Munakata, Date distributes copies of a newspaper article he has written detailing the truth about Munakata from a helicopter above the Millennium Tower. In the epilogue he is shown to have been reinstated to the police force, working with Sudo and Tanimura.

During Yakuza 6 Date plays a minor role as he helps Kiryu to secure Haruka's safety. He is also forced to keep the secret of Onomichi after the politician bribed Kiryu and unwillingly help Kiryu to fake his death.

Date also makes his return in Yakuza: Like a Dragon as a minor character.

Tsumura (津村)

Tsumura is a Jingweon man working for Daejin Kim and Wataru Kurahashi. He is also an employee that works in Kage's office. Tsumura is first seen talking to Ryuji Goda about activating one of the bombs in the Millennium Tower. After Hiroshi Hayashi and his men invade the transformer room, Tsumura attempts to stop Kage finding out Daigo Dojima's location by hacking the computers, but Kaoru Sayama beats him. Tsumura was later seen with Kurahashi and attempted to shoot Kiryu when he grabbed Kurahashi, but he was shot in the arm and fled. When Yukio Terada revealed himself as Jingweon survivor Daejin Kim, Tsumura was one of his men that attempted to kill Kiryu. At the end, Tsumura is killed along with all of Terada's remaining henchmen.

New Serena's Mama (ニューセレナのママ, Nyū Serena no Mama)

Named Mariko in overseas versions of Yakuza 3, Mama bought Serena and reopened it after refurbishing the bar. When Date confesses his feelings towards her, she rejects him, fearing that an incident in which her former husband, a police officer, was killed would happen again. After Date saves her from the man again, however, she appears to reconsider.

Yuya (ユウヤ, Yūya)

Voiced by: Kenta Miyake (Japanese); Dave Fouquette (Yakuza), Patrick Seitz (Like a Dragon: Infinite Wealth onwards) (English)

Yuya is the manager of host club Stardust and owner Kazuki's right-hand man. He is outspoken, proud, and more than willing to fight for both Kazuki and Stardust. His girlfriend, Miyu, is the main attraction at Kamurocho's Asia strip club. It is revealed that he has a deep hatred for the yakuza when Yuya mistakes Kiryu for a yakuza before getting beaten by him. He holds a deep respect for Kiryu. He used to belong to a biker gang called Black Thunder, which he co-founded, before joining Stardust and cleaning himself up.

Kazuki (一輝)

Voiced by: Hiroshi Tsuchida (Japanese); Keith Ferguson (Yakuza), Christopher Sean (Like a Dragon: Infinite Wealth onwards) (English)

Portrayed by: Haruhiko Kato (Like a Dragon)

Kazuki is the young owner of Stardust, a popular host club located directly opposite Serena. Kind and charismatic, he is indebted to Kazama and helps Kiryu at his request.

During Yakuza 2, Kazuki is pursued by Kawara and Date, when Kawara reveals that Kazuki is not actually Japanese, but a Korean and part of the Jingweon Mafia. It is revealed that the Kazuki seen at the start of the game is actually a Korean doppelgänger, and the real Kazuki has been held captive for approximately six months. In the ensuing struggle between Kiryu and the impostor, Kazuki is shot and is hospitalized for the rest of the game. After the Jingweon invade Emoto's clinic, where Kazuki is recovering, mistaking him for the fake, Kazuki reveals that the Jingweon have hidden bombs all over the town.

Emoto (柄本)

Emoto is the only doctor in Kamurocho, and heads Kamurocho's Emoto Clinic, which is funded by Shintaro Kazama. He is a former head of surgery at Toto Hospital. He saves a boy with appendicitis in Yakuza and makes numerous appearances later in the series.

During the events of Yakuza 2 he helps Kazuki and Kawara after they are shot, and later Majima.

Emoto provides Tatsuya in Kurohyou with medical treatment for a cheap payment as he was working for the Kuki family who have relations to the Tojo.

The Florist of Sai (サイの花屋, Sai no Hanaya)

Voiced by: Yoshiaki Fujiwara (Japanese); Dwight Schultz (Yakuza), Patrick Seitz (Yakuza Kiwami 3) (English)
Portrayed by: Tomoya Maeno (Like a Dragon: Yakuza)

Originally named Kage the Florist in English localization, the Florist of Sai is the mastermind behind a self-sufficient underground world called Purgatory and a district-wide surveillance system, a notorious professional informant and can provide any information for a price. The Florist, whose real name is a mystery, once worked for the police until he was busted by fellow detective Makoto Date for selling information on the black market. He abandoned his family when he went underground, but still watches over them. His Japanese name is taken from "Sai no Kawara" (the Japanese name for Purgatory) and "Hanaya", the Japanese word for florist, since he provides his information using cards attached to flower bouquets.

During Yakuza, the Florist is based in Purgatory. In Yakuza 2 he has moved to the Millennium Tower's 50th floor, before returning to Purgatory. During Yakuza 3 and 4, he borrows the space from Majima, who now owns the area to build Kamurocho Hills.

His son, Takashi, is involved with a girl called Kyoko, who happens to be the daughter of the head of the Atobe Family. The Florist repeatedly helps his son out, although Takashi does not know who the Florist really is, and says someday he would like to meet Takashi as a father rather than as an informant. In Yakuza 4, Takashi requests that the Florist tells him who his real father is, and the Florist sends him a bouquet telling him his father is dead; Takashi, however, recognises the flowers and makes the connection.

=== Other characters ===
Yumi Sawamura (澤村 由美, Sawamura Yumi)

Voiced by: Miyako Uesaka (Yakuza), Maaya Sakamoto (Yakuza Kiwami) (Japanese); Eliza Dushku (Yakuza), Xanthe Huynh (Like a Dragon: Yakuza (English)
Portrayed by: Ayaka Maeda (Like a Dragon: Prologue), Saki Takaoka (Like a Dragon), Yuumi Kawai (Like a Dragon: Yakuza)

Born June 30, 1971, Yumi grew up with Kiryu and Nishiki, and worked as a hostess at Serena. She was abducted by Sohei Dojima, and the trauma of the event caused her to lose her memory; shortly after, she checked herself out of the hospital and disappeared. She meets the corrupt politician Kyohei Jingu while amnesiac, with whom she conceives Haruka. She is later taken in by Kazama, who attempts to help her regain her memory. She eventually recalls the traumatic events she witnessed when Nishiki shot Dojima. She creates a cover identity of a fictional younger sister and calls herself Mizuki Sawamura (澤村 美月, Sawamura Mizuki); she raises Haruka at the Sunflower orphanage to keep her safe from Jingu, and manages her own bar, called Ares, located on top of the Millennium Tower. She later steals 10 billion yen from the Tojo Clan along with Kazama and Sera, as it is in fact Jingu's money, who has been using the Tojo Clan to make money for him for years. Kiryu and Yumi are eventually reunited in the final chapter of the first Yakuza, but she is ultimately killed when she sacrifices herself to save Kiryu and Haruka from a shot fired by Jingu.

Reina (麗奈)

Voiced by: Junko Mihara (Yakuza), Hiromi Tsuru (Yakuza 0), Atsuko Tanaka (Yakuza Kiwami) (Japanese); Rachael Leigh Cook (Yakuza), Michelle Wong (Yakuza 0: Director's Cut) (English)
Portrayed by: Saki Takaoka (Like a Dragon: Yakuza)

A woman who runs Serena during the events of Yakuza and Yakuza 0. A long-time friend of Kiryu and Nishiki who were regulars at her bar before Dojima's murder. Reina helps Kiryu by letting him use Serena as a hideout and takes care of Haruka whenever Kiryu has to go somewhere. In chapter 9, it is revealed that she betrayed Kiryu out of love for Nishiki and became his informant. After attempting to kill Nishiki herself, she is rescued by Shinji from Nishiki's agents, but both ultimately met their demise.

Gary Buster Holmes (ゲーリー・バスター・ホームズ)

Voiced by: Yasuhiro Mamiya (Japanese); Gary Anthony Williams (Yakuza), Isaac C. Singleton Jr. (Yakuza: Like a Dragon) (English)

Gary Buster Holmes is the African-American Underground Coliseum 2003–2005 champion, undefeated until he fights Kiryu. He also works as a bodyguard for Kage within the Purgatory area. He speaks fluent Japanese but points out to Kiryu that he does not actually understand the words.

During Yakuza 2, he works as a builder at the Kamurocho Hills construction site. He is still working there during Yakuza 4 and decides to challenge Kiryu to one last fight.

Saya Date (伊達 沙耶, Date Saya)

Voiced by: Akina Okada (Yakuza), Ryoko Shiraishi (Yakuza Kiwami) (Japanese); Nan McNamara (Yakuza) (English)

The rebellious only daughter of Detective Makoto Date, she often goes looking for trouble in the streets of Kamurocho. In Yakuza 2, she decides to become a hairdresser. In Yakuza 4 she is shown to have become successful and wants her father to meet her new boyfriend. Although she now lives with her mother, she and Makoto still have a good relationship.

Renji Kamiyama (上山 連次, Kamiyama Renji)

Renji is Kamurocho's Kamiyama Works (ワークス上山) owner. He tunes up and repairs weapons; he also sells DVDs to Kiryu that allow weapon modification. He is Renta Kamiyama's younger brother and is himself a fighter, using a pair of kali sticks in Kamurocho's "Weapon Master GP" underground fighting tournament under the nickname "The Weaponmaster".

Yasuko Saejima (冴島 靖子, Saejima Yasuko)

Voiced by: Maju Ozawa

A mysterious woman who requests to borrow 100 million yen from Akiyama, using the pseudonym, Lily. She murdered Kanemura and the owner of Daijoyū at the behest of Katsuragi. Taiga Saejima's younger sister. She encounters each of the main characters on her search for her brother. When the two are finally reunited, Katsuragi shoots her and having spoken to her brother one last time and killed Katsuragi, she dies in Taiga's arms.

Hana (花)

Voiced by: Aya Hirano

Akiyama's secretary and the only employee at Sky Finance, who appears in Yakuza 4. She craves the kalbi at Korean yakiniku restaurant Kanrai, and is surprisingly strong, even able to defend herself against a troupe of yakuza. She formerly worked with Akiyama at the same bank he was employed at. After Akiyama lends Yasuko the 100 million yen she asks for, even though he knows he likely would not get it back, Hana becomes enraged and runs away. After being caught by Akiyama, she quits. She returns in the epilogue, now thin. The two almost kiss, but Akiyama quickly beings to talk about Hana's favourite kalbi, for which she admonishes him, asking if he's trying to make her fat again. Hana (EP version) can be called to sing karaoke with Akiyama on a Premium New Game, as well as her standard version.

In the zombie spinoff Dead Souls, she appears as her former self, having returned to her old body type after going back to her old diet.

== Okinawa inhabitants ==
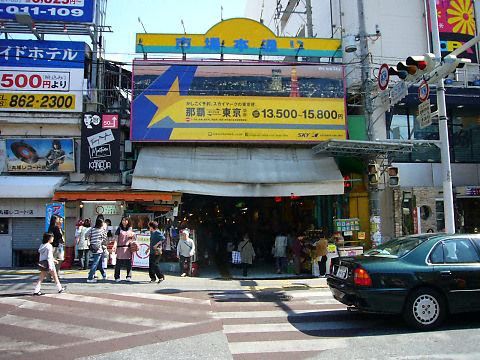
The Karyushi Arcade and Ryukyugai areas are modeled after Naha's Ichiba Hondorigai (市場本通り) and Kokusaidori (国際通り).

=== Morning Glory Orphanage ===
Morning Glory Orphanage (アサガオ, Asagao, originally localized as Sunshine Orphanage) is located on Naha's coast opposite a beach. The institution hosts eight local children plus Haruka Sawamura and is managed by Kazuma Kiryu, though the land belongs to Shigeru Nakahara. Kiryu was himself raised in a similar institution called Sunflower Orphanage during the 1970s and 1980s, so when was asked if he knew anyone to take on the job, he volunteered himself.

Taichi (太一, Ta'ichi) 10 years old. A tough boy, he acts as the orphanage children's natural leader. He dreams about becoming a professional wrestler. He appears in Yakuza 4 as an 11-year-old.

Ayako (綾子) 11 years old. Being the orphanage's second eldest she carries the "mother" role as her duty, often at her own expense. She appears in Yakuza 4 as a 12-year-old.

Koji (宏次,Kōji) 10 years old. Koji is into sports and often plays with the other orphanage boys on the orphanage's beach. He appears in Yakuza 4 as an 11-year-old.

Eri (エリ) 9 years old. She is a withdrawn girl who has difficulties getting along with the other children.

Mitsuo (三雄) 9 years old. Mitsuo is the son of an African-American father and a Japanese mother. His mother raised him alone in Japan as his father returned to America without knowing he has a child. He joined the orphanage after the death of his mother. His closest friend is Taichi. He has a crush on Riona.

Riona (理緒奈) 9 years old. She always wears long-sleeved clothes to hide the scars on her arms, caused by the fire that killed her parents.

Shiro (志郎, Shirō) 8 years old. He is shy but smart and wants to become a doctor. Shiro has trouble at school with the teacher's son bullying him.

Izumi (泉) 8 years old. As the orphanage's youngest and smallest, she tends to be selfish and somewhat of a loner. She takes care of and trains Mame, the orphanage dog, which reminds her of a dog she used to own.

=== Ryudo Family ===
The Ryudo Family (琉道一家, Ryūdō Ikka) is a small Okinawan bōryokudan headed by Nakahara, featured in Yakuza 3.

Shigeru Nakahara (名嘉原 茂, Nakahara Shigeru)

Voiced by: Shigeru Izumiya (Yakuza 3), Ryo Ishibashi (Yakuza Kiwami 3) (Japanese); Jesse Corti (English)

Nakahara is the owner of the Sunshine Orphanage's land. He is the old yet tough leader of the Ryudo yakuza family.

Rikiya Shimabukuro (島袋 力也, Shimabukuro Rikiya)

Voiced by: Tatsuya Fujiwara (Yakuza 3), Show Kasamatsu (Yakuza Kiwami 3) (Japanese); Zeno Robinson (English)

Rikiya, 25, is Nakahara's senior henchman, who has a fierce love of Okinawa. His self-proclaimed nickname, "Bare-Handed Viper" (ステゴロのハブ, Sutegoro no Habu) comes from the habu pitviper tattoo on his back. Initially hostile towards Kiryu, he gradually came to respect him and refer to him as "brother". Rikiya was kidnapped by Lau Ka Long's men and almost killed but was saved by Joji Kazama. After returning to Okinawa, and after the orphanage was destroyed, he took a bullet meant for Kiryu while rescuing Nakahara.

Mikio Aragaki (新垣 幹夫, Aragaki Mikio)

Voiced by: Daisuke Miyakawa (Japanese); Earl Baylon (English)

Mikio is Rikiya's friend and fellow Ryudo family member, but still a rookie. He has blonde hair and a purple shirt. He built a doghouse for Rex. The locals are fond of him and refer to him as "Mikio-chan".

Saki (咲)

12 years old. Saki is a young girl that became mute after being abused by her mother and witnessing her father's suicide and can only communicate by drawing pictures in her sketchbook. She was raised by Nakahara. It is Saki who first alerts Kiryu to Kazama having shot Nakahara. She first speaks again to warn Nakahara to get out of the way of a charging bull.

=== Tamashiro Family ===
The Tamashiro Family (玉城組, Tamashiro-gumi) is a powerful Okinawan yakuza group and a rival to Nakahara's Ryudo family during the events of Yakuza 3.

Tetsuo Tamashiro (玉城 鉄生, Tamashiro Tetsuo)
54 years old, who wears sunglasses and a red suit with a black shirt. Tamashiro is the head of the Tamashiro Family of Ryukyu. His fighting style includes local brass knuckles, tekko. After he is defeated by Kiryu he shoots at him, but Rikiya takes the bullet and dies. Joji Kazama arrives just after Rikiya is shot and kills Tamashiro.

In Yakuza 4, Tamashiro's vacant office is used as a meeting place by Kiryu, Hamazaki and Yasuko.

== Reception ==
As a result of the early games being only in Japanese, Caroline Almeida Santos from Universidade Federal de Santa Catarina and Philippe René Marie Humbl from Universiteit Brussel praised the characterization of leads, with special focus on Majima's tone whenever he talks with somebody he cares. Sam Greszes from Polygon opined that the conflict between positive and toxic masculinity is at the core of the Yakuza franchise, and it is exemplified in the deterioration of Kiryu's relationship with Nishiki; he believes that Nishiki's circumstances are a clear representation of the horrific manner in which toxic masculinity can warp an individual's personality. Greszes was of the view that Nishiki's inferiority complex, borne from being unfavorably compared with Kiryu by his adopted father and other members of the Tojo Clan, combined with a series of personal tragedies culminating in his sister's tragic death, led him to become cold and unfeeling instead of grappling with his own intense pain and sadness. Greszes suggested that this causes men such as Nishiki - consumed by ambition, abuse, or deep emotional repression - to violently and randomly lash out at other men, to emotionally and physically abuse women, and to betray trusted friends. Conversely, Peter Glagowski from Destructoid said that Kiwami 2 tries to build up Goda as a menacing villain with an interesting backstory, but paradoxically does not afford him adequate screen time; as a result, he found the character to be unconvincing as an "ultimate threat" to Kiryu. Hayden Dingman from PCWorld agreed that Goda is underutilized, but is nevertheless a fantastic foil to Kiryu.

Claudia Bonillo Fenrnandes from Zaragorza University said Majima and Kiryu's roles in Yakuza 0 are similar to 1980s yakuza as in such period Kansai used to get into conflicts with Kanto. Majima's story also explores the traffic of firearms and later traffic of humans when he meets Makoto Makimura. Majima's idolatrion for Shimano's clan reflects a similar trend in Japanese movies which embodies the concept of manliness in the same fashion as how Kiryu and Nishikiyama which to become yakuza like their guardian Kazama. However, the embodiment of violence present in the yakuza heavily affects Majima in the narrative to the point he tries as much he can to stop Makoto Makimura from getting involved with them. The brotherly love between Majima and his sworn brother Saejima in entire series noted by the writer to be popular enough within Japan to appeal to fans of boy's romance.

USGamer appreciated playing as Haruka in Yakuza 5 due to the change of pace Sega provided after multiple types of fighters in the narrative and felt that her long distanced relationship with her adoptive father was the most appealing area of the game. HobbyConsolas stated while idols might not be interesting to Western gamers, Haruka still offered more variety to the game. Polygon wrote an article about how Haruka is relevant in a narrative filled with toxic masculinity, she is still depending on others including Kiryu and Akiyama despite achieving her dreams of becoming an idol.

Kotaku claimed that while Haruka's newfound happiness with Haruto serves as a positive note to close Kiryu's arc, the fact that Kiryu survives after receiving mortal wounds and leaves reduced the tension the player felt. Leah Williams and Tegan Jones from Kotaku Australia welcomed the decision to have Ichiban succeed Kiryu as the new lead character of the franchise, lauding his character arc to be simultaneously moving as well as one filled with ridiculous fun. In his review of Like a Dragon, Espcapist Magazine commended it for how "a likeable protagonist and a bit more of a lean into the usual wackiness it has successfully charmed the nurses into keeping the life support machine plugged in. Every Yakuza game is basically a loose box of disconnected toys, but for the record, this is a particularly nice box with some choice toys. Like, Legos and Masters of the Universe." Kotaku criticized the continuous usage of the character in latter games for continue having new arcs and feared his return as a playable and major character in Infinite Wealth would take the spotlight over his successor, Ichiban Kasuga.
