= Yakuza 4 =

2010 video game

- Developer: Sega CS1 R&D (Note: Ryu Ga Gotoku Studio developed the remastered version. Ported to Windows by QLOC.)
- Publisher: Sega
- Director: Jun Orihara
- Producer: Masayoshi Kikuchi
- Programmer: Koji Tokieda
- Artist: Kazuki Hosokawa
- Writer: Masayoshi Yokoyama
- Composer: Hidenori Shoji
- Series: Yakuza
- Platforms: PlayStation 3; PlayStation 4; Windows; Xbox One
- Release: PlayStation 3: JP: March 18, 2010; NA: March 15, 2011; EU: March 18, 2011; PlayStation 4: JP: January 17, 2019; WW: October 29, 2019; Windows, Xbox One: WW: January 28, 2021
- Genres: Action-adventure, beat 'em up
- Mode: Single-player

Yakuza 4 (Note: Japanese: 龍が如く4 伝説を継ぐもの, Hepburn: Ryū ga Gotoku Fō: Densetsu wo Tsugumono; lit. "Like a Dragon 4: Heir to the Legend") is a 2010 action-adventure game developed and published by Sega for the PlayStation 3. The sequel to Yakuza 3 and the fourth main installment in the Yakuza series, it was released in Japan in March 2010 and internationally in March 2011.

A remaster was released on the PlayStation 4 on January 17, 2019, in Japan, and worldwide on October 29, 2019, as part of The Yakuza Remastered Collection. Versions for Windows and Xbox One were released in January 2021. Because Hiroki Narimiya retired from acting due to allegations of drug use, the role of Tanimura was recast with Toshiki Masuda taking over. A sequel, Yakuza 5, was released in 2012.

== Gameplay ==
The available mini-games are pachinko, fishing, onsen, massage, table tennis, hanafuda and karaoke, including duets with non-player characters (NPCs). In Haruka's Wish, the player must raise Haruka's trust level. Each main character has a side game or goal which must be completed, and many side games are related to trophies.

Akiyama may create friendship (馴染み, Najimi) with some NPCs by buying them items, or with some storekeepers by being a regular customer. His other mission, Create a #1 Hostess! (No. 1キャバ嬢をつくろう！, No. 1 Kyabajō o Tsukurō!), is to scout girls for the cabaret he owns. A girl is improved by dressing her up and training her. After she becomes number one, the player can choose a final outfit for her and she will appear at the cabaret. A similar challenge in the Japanese version of Yakuza 3 was cut from overseas versions and was reintroduced for its remastered edition.

Saejima's mission, Create a Fighter! (格闘家をつくろう！, Kakutōka o Tsukurō!) is to train fighters to win tournaments after 50 rounds or less of training (building up movesets). Different movesets allow different moves to be performed.

Tanimura's mission, Resolving Police-Radio Disputes (警察無線トラブル解決バトル, Keisatsu Musen Toraburu Kaiketsu Batoru), is to keep the peace on the streets of Kamurocho. Radio reports tell him where to find incidents, and the player must defeat the perpetrator. In Kiryu's mission, Team Encounter Battle (チームエンカウントバトル), seven gangs attack him and he must fight to reach each gang leader.

Each character has his own style of fighting and special moves as their body frames are different. Kiryu focuses on the powerful blows of Karate and Boxing, Akiyama prefers swift attacks using Taekwondo, Saejima favors powerful and slow brawling/grappling attacks using wrestling techniques, and Tanimura uses the defensive maneuvers of Aikido and Jiu Jitsu that he learned from his time at the police academy.

== Story ==
=== Setting ===
Left to right: Shun Akiyama, Taiga Saejima, Kazuma Kiryu and Masayoshi Tanimura

Yakuza 4 takes place one year after the events of Yakuza 3. Like the original game, most of the action takes place in Kamurocho (resembling Shinjuku's red-light district, Kabukichō). Three locations have been added since Yakuza 3: a rooftop area stretching across a large portion of the town, the back streets of Kamurocho (known as Rojiura (路地裏)) and a third area known as the underground (or "chika" (地下), which includes the city's sewers, parking lot and shopping arcades). The underground area is also known as Kamuchika (カムチカ), short for Kamuro Chika (Kamuro underground).

=== Characters ===
Yakuza 4 has three new protagonists in addition to Kazuma Kiryu (Takaya Kuroda), the main character since the original Yakuza game: Masayoshi Tanimura (Hiroki Narimiya/Toshiki Masuda), Shun Akiyama (Koichi Yamadera) and Taiga Saejima (Rikiya Koyama). Other new characters include Junji Sugiuchi (Kenichi Endō), a Tokyo Metropolitan Police Department detective; Hiroaki Arai (Ikki Sawamura), a Tojo Clan yakuza; Takeshi Kido (Kenta Kiritani), Kanemura Enterprises member; Seishirō Munakata (Kinya Kitaoji), a high-ranking police officer and a woman, Lily (Maju Ozawa). Returning characters are Haruka Sawamura (Rie Kugimiya), Goro Majima (Hidenari Ugaki), Makoto Date (Kazuhiro Yamaji), Daigo Dojima (Satoshi Tokushige) and Goh Hamazaki (George Takahashi).

=== Plot ===
Loan shark Shun Akiyama learns that members of the Ueno Seiwa Clan, a Yakuza faction involved in a power struggle with the Tojo Clan since the early 1980s, are causing a disturbance. Akiyama beats them up as Tojo Clan members Hiroaki Arai and Takeshi Kido arrive. One of the men, Masaru Ihara (Takahiro Fujimoto), shoots at Arai and flees. Akiyama returns to his office only to find that Arai killed Ihara. Arai flees, and Akiyama is brought in for questioning. His secretary, Hana (Aya Hirano), gets him released, but detective Junji Sugiuchi warns Akiyama to avoid the yakuza. Akiyama reveals to Kido that he used money from the Millennium Tower explosion (Note: As depicted in Yakuza.) to start his firm, Sky Finance. Later on, a woman named Lily requests a ¥100 million loan. Akiyama learns that people involved with her are being killed, and when he confronts her, she takes the money and flees. Akiyama eventually meets Goro Majima, who reveals that he is looking for Lily.

In 1985, Majima and his blood brother, Taiga Saejima, prepare to assassinate the chairman of the Ueno Seiwa Clan. Saejima is forced to perform the hit alone, killing eighteen men, though the chairman and one other officer, Isao Katsuragi (Fumihiko Tachiki), survive. Saejima is sentenced to death. In the present, just days before his scheduled execution, Saejima is transferred to a prison off the coast of Okinawa. He meets former Tojo patriarch Goh Hamazaki, imprisoned for attempting to murder Kiryu. (Note: As depicted in Yakuza 3.) He reveals to Saejima that he was set up. They escape, and Hamazaki seemingly sacrifices himself to save Saejima from the prison chief, Saito (Masato Obara). Saejima washes up to shore and meets Kiryu and Haruka. With help from Kiryu, Saejima tracks down and fights Majima, who reveals that he was intercepted on the day of the hit.

Detective Masayoshi Tanimura investigates Ihara's murder. He finds Lily, who is revealed to be Saejima's sister Yasuko, and rescues her from the Shibata Family. He learns that patriarch Kazuo Shibata (Hōchū Ōtsuka) is working with Arai and organized the 1985 hit with help from Katsuragi. Arai kills Shibata under Katsuragi's orders and flees. Tanimura tells Yasuko that his father was investigating the hit, but was killed. Yasuko tells him that she was coerced into killing Shibata's men by Katsuragi, who promised to have Saejima's case reexamined if she eliminated them or gave him ¥100 million. Tanimura meets Katsuragi and hands him the money. Katsuragi then reveals that he was responsible for the eighteen murders, and orders Tanimura killed. However, Sugiuchi saves him.

Tanimura's superior, Satoshi Hisai (Hideyuki Tanaka), reveals that Sugiuchi was his father's partner. Tanimura returns the money to Akiyama, and they conclude that Katsuragi is silencing anyone involved with the hit. Yutaka Mishima (Yoshihiro Kanemitsu), Ihara's friend, contacts Tanimura, offering to inform on Katsuragi. Sugiuchi kills Mishima and reveals that he is Katsuragi's mole, and that he killed Tanimura's father. He reveals that he and Katsuragi covered up the hit with help from Deputy Commissioner Seishiro Munakata. Hisai, who was Munakata's mole, killed Sugiuchi and committed suicide out of guilt.

Hamazaki, having survived, arrives at Kiryu's orphanage. He tells Kiryu he wants to reform and reveals a ledger indicating that the police instigated the 10 billion yen incident alongside Kyohei Jingu. He links the scheme to Munakata and Katsuragi, who plan to destroy the Tojo and allow the Ueno Seiwa to take over Kamurocho. When Hamazaki is about to turn himself in, he and Kiryu find Yasuko, and offer to help her. Saito arrives with orders to kill them. Kiryu beats him and goes to Kamurocho with Yasuko; Hamazaki is wounded and later dies.

Later on, Sky Finance is raided, so Akiyama and Tanimura agree to work together. Kiryu leaves Yasuko with Date, and goes to meet Majima, who is seen being arrested. Munakata tells Daigo Dojima his plan to give the police control of organized crime, and offers to eliminate the Ueno Seiwa if Daigo promotes Arai, who is an undercover police officer.

Kiryu finds Date drugged by Yasuko, and is forced to track her down. He is confronted by Akiyama and Tanimura, but beats them, and then learns that Yasuko and Saejima have been captured by Katsuragi. Back at Serena, Akiyama tells everyone that Kido, under orders from Katsuragi, stole ¥100 billion yen from him. At Kamurocho Hills, Katsuragi tells Kiryu he will return the Saejimas and the money in return for the ledger, but Kido shoots him and gives the ledger to Arai, who shoots him and leaves. Katsuragi and Yasuko kill each other; and Arai shoots Munakata when he orders him to kidnap Haruka and Kiryu's orphans to recover the money.

Kiryu uses Hamazaki's and Yasuko's deaths to motivate Saejima, Tanimura and Akiyama. They use Akiyama's money as bait on the roof of the Millennium Tower. Daigo and Arai arrive to claim it, along with Kido, who reveals he is working for Daigo. Munakata, having faked his death, brings officers to kill the others. Akiyama, Kiryu, Saejima and Tanimura defeat Arai, Daigo, Kido, and Munakata and his men. When Munakata declares that he is untouchable, Date scatters newspapers exposing his corruption. He shoots Akiyama, but a wad of money stops the bullet. Faced with prison, Munakata commits suicide. Arai surrenders to the authorities.

Months later, the group meets outside Akiyama's office, where he intends to restart his business. Date rejoins the police and asks Kiryu what he intends to do; Kiryu, Daigo, and a newly freed Majima appoint Saejima as patriarch of his own family at Tojo Clan headquarters.

== Soundtrack ==
The theme song to the Japanese version, played during the introductory video when starting the game, is "Butterfly City" by Japanese hip-hop artist Zeebra featuring Ryo the Skywalker and Mummy D. (Rhymester) with music by DJ Hasebe (also known as Old Nick). The music video, posted on Ariola Japan's YouTube channel, disclosed that R&B singer Double contributed vocals to the song. The CD was released by Ariola Japan (SME) on March 17, 2010, in a regular edition (BVCL-89) and a first-press limited edition, including a bonus video DVD (BVCL-87) and an alternate cover with Kiryu. Zeebra first contributed to the series with Ryū ga Gotoku Kenzan!'s opening theme, "Bushido". The western version removes these songs and replaces them with original pieces due to licensing issues.

== Release ==
The game was formally announced on July 24, 2009. A promotional video was presented at the 2009 Tokyo Game Show. It was released on March 18, 2010, in Japan, after a playable demo was released on the Japanese PlayStation Store on March 5. Yakuza 4 was released in Europe and North America in March 2011.

Limited edition apparel was released in Japan and the United States.

Three new tie-ins were made to shops: Watami's izakaya on Nakamichi Street, along with Cuez Bar and Milestone in the underground. Advertisements for other companies (such as Nico Nico Douga) are in the game, especially on the walls in the underground. Promotional flyers can be found in the underground of the bowling alley, some of which offer discounts on in-game products, and there is advertising on both sets of coin lockers. A staff member at Volcano, the pachislot building, will ask for a password obtainable from the 777town website. Kamurocho residents' conversations refer to companies such as 777town.

== Reception ==
Reception

Aggregate scores
| Aggregator | Score |
|---|---|
| Metacritic | PS3: 78/100; PS4: 78/100 |
| OpenCritic | 83% recommend(Remaster) (Note: Based on 12 reviews) |

Review scores
| Publication | Score |
|---|---|
| Famitsu | 38/40 |
| GameSpot | 8/10 |

Yakuza 4 received mostly positive reviews from critics. The game received an Award for Excellence at the 2010 Japan Game Awards, and received a score of 38 out of 40 from Famitsu. GameSpot described it as 'positively bursting with other things to do', and found the story 'benefits a great deal from its focus on four distinct heroes', though noted that it 'isn't always told in an engaging way'. It has a valuation of 78 out of 100 on Metacritic based on 59 reviews.

=== Sales ===
In the week of its debut, Yakuza 4 sold over 384,000 units.

== Sequel ==
On August 31, 2011, two new Yakuza games were announced: Yakuza 5 and a sequel to the PSP game, Kurohyō 2. Yakuza 5 was released in Japan on December 6, 2012, and received a worldwide release on December 8, 2015, as a PlayStation Network download.
