= Characters of the Judgement series =

List of video game characters

From left to right: Fumiya Sugiura, Takayuki Yagami, Mahasaru Kaito and Toru Higashi.

Judgment and its sequel Lost Judgment are two action games published by Sega and created by Ryu Ga Gotoku Studio that feature original characters living primarily in the Kamurochō district as well as Isezaki Ijincho. Both games follow lawyer-turned-detective Takayuki Yagami as he investigates criminal cases. Yagami's friend Masaharu Kaito is the central focus of The Kaito Files, a downloadable content expansion pack for Lost Judgment.

== Creation ==
Judgment was created by several staff members who previously worked in the Yakuza series. The team enhanced the game engine from the latest Yakuza games to improve character design, changing the game's lighting to emphasize its theme of "legal suspense". The team decided to explore the fictional city of Kamurocho (from Yakuza) using a different approach. Similar to Yakuza, real-world shops such as Don Quijote were used to impart realism. A "friendship" system was developed to characterize Yagami's personality as he forms bonds with several non-playable characters, which integrates them into the setting. His traits are balanced in the main story and the sidequests for a balance between seriousness and comedy—his seriousness is explored in the main story, while comedy is featured in the sidequests. Despite the similarities, producer Kazuki Hosokawa said that Judgment is not a spin-off to Yakuza and instead its own IP leading to its characters being completely original without any intention to feature characters from the other series. However, characters from Judgment would eventually appear as part of the side content in the Yakuza side game Like a Dragon Gaiden: The Man Who Erased His Name.

The details of Yagami's past, as well as his new life as a detective, were elaborated on to attract players to him. Because of the popularity of detective stories, Yagami was written to obtain knowledge throughout the game, along with the player. Multiple actors were chosen based on their experience. Akira Nakao plays attorney Ryuzo Genda, who looked after Yagami when he was a lawyer. Shosuke Tanihara was cast as detective Mitsuru Kuroiwa because of his strong visual appearance, making impressive scenes when he and Kimura appear together. Pierre Taki was cast as Kyohei Hamura because of his history of portraying famous criminals. While Yagami is linked with multiple female characters, none of them were created as a love interest to avoid using romance in the narrative.

Lost Judgment was written to be realistic, something the staff found challenging while providing themes seen as sensitive to the audience like bullying as well as what should people call justice, with the latter being explored through Yagami's characterization. The youth drama is meant to balance the dark storytelling based on how Yagami interacts with teenagers. Hosokawa said the team read books from authors like Keigo Higashino and Hideo Yokoyama when preparing to write the game with the former's novel The Devotion of Suspect X being a major influence. The narrative focuses primarily on bullying as they consider it as a "Distorted justice" which clashes with Yagami's morals. Strichart commented that Yagami is not a hero so he is not able to solve all these cases on his which contrast the fantasy style Persona 5 which often deals with the protagonists saving victims using their powers. During Lost Judgment Yagami meets Kuwana who instead tries to solve every attempt of bullying regardless of methods. In contrast to Judgment, the sequel does not end on satisfactory note for Yagami as Kuwana manages to escape from the protagonist. Nevertheless, Yagami demonstrates a major influence on the bullies he meets in the game's beginning to the point they become heroic figures during the climax.

=== Localization ===
Sega believed that Judgment would be a better choice as the studio's first English dub localization, as it could attract newcomers to the series. In scripting, Strichart insisted that the English actors keep using Japanese honorifics to retain the Japanese cast's impact. Localization producer Scott Strichart observed that the portrayals of yakuza are faithful to the main series due to multiple characters being involved in the clans. Yagami was noted for standing out among the cast as he has multiple life choices in contrast to the other cast members, who are forced to be yakuza. Multiple auditions were held to cast the English-language voice actors, aiming to make the English dub as natural as possible. Greg Chun was pleasantly surprised when he was selected to voice Yagami in Judgment since he was familiar with the franchise. Chun said, "I'm super psyched to be a part of this game", adding that he liked what he had seen of the character.

For the English version of Lost Judgment, many of the cast members from the first installment returned, but Strichart said some were replaced for logistical reasons. The English recording studio was made in PCB Productions owned by Keith Arem with major aid by Vicky Lee. The translation was done by Jyun Takagi, shored up with support from Shun Fukuda and Mino Iwasaki. Josh Malone, who worked on Yakuza: Like a Dragon and Shinada in the Yakuza remasters, stepped up in a big way to help handle voice over. He was supported by Shervin Zadeh, Shaun Gannon, and Stephanie Spoleti, who was also a Yakuza vet.

== Protagonists ==
=== Takayuki Yagami ===
Voiced by: Takuya Kimura (Japanese); Greg Chun (English)

Takayuki Yagami (八神 隆之, Yagami Takayuki), "Tak" (ター坊, Tabo) for short, is the protagonist of both Judgment and Lost Judgment. Following the femicide of a nurse at the hands of a man he once defended, Yagami quits his work as a lawyer and becomes a detective with the former yakuza Masaharu Kaito. Yagami struggles with solving a case involving corpses lacking their eyes which is connected with Emi's death. While Judgment focuses on Yagami's redemption, Lost Judgment instead focuses on Yagami's actions that he can do to save others and whether or not he can trust the law.

=== Masaharu Kaito ===
Voiced by: Shinshu Fuji (Japanese); Crispin Freeman (English)

Masaharu Kaito (海藤 正治, Kaitō Masaharu) is a friend of Yagami who also works with him. Both's original meeting takes back to decades before the first game's story where the two repeatedly fight with Kaito's boss, Matsugane, overseeing them. While Kaito is a trusted yakuza, during an rob orchestrated by Hamura secretly, he is forced to leave the family with Yagami recruiting him before he has to lose a finger. Kaito often assists Yagami in battle but is also a boss character in an obligatory quest. Kaito remains working with Yagami in Lost Judgment and is the protagonist of the downloadable content The Kaito Files.

== Genda Law Office ==
=== Ryuzo Genda ===
Voiced by: Akira Nakao (Japanese); Brian McNamara (English)

Ryuzo Genda (源田 龍造, Genda Ryūzō) is the director of Genda Law. He sees his coworkers as his own children and often gives Yagami extra work especially in Judgment when dealing with his past. Both he and Mastsugane treated the orphan Yagami when he was a child to educate himself and become a lawyer. Akira Nakao, who voices Genda in Japanese, noted that he became highly popular thanks to Judgment especially within the young demographic.

=== Saori Shirosaki ===
Voiced by: Yuko Kaida (Japanese); Aimée Castle (Judgment), Stephanie Sheh (Lost Judgment) (English)

Saori Shirosaki (城崎 さおり, Shirosaki Saori) is a defense attorney working at the Genda Law Office. She is friendly with the other members from the Office and often thinks about her former classmate Mafuyu Fujii date Yagami. During the two games, Yagami requests Shirosaki help with solving different cases which leads to areas where the player controls the defense attorney.

=== Issei Hoshino ===
Voiced by: Yuu Hayashi (Japanese); Joe Zieja (English)

Issei Hoshino (星野 一生, Hoshino Issei) is a young member of Genda Law Office who often solves cases with the other members and Yagami. He has feelings for Shirosaki but finds it challenging to express himself.

=== Masamichi Shintani ===
Voiced by: Takuya Kirimoto (Japanese); Keythe Farley (English)

Masamichi Shintani (新谷 正道, Shintani Masamichi) is a defense attorney working for Genda Law. A superior to Yagami, who often sees him as a mentor despite the jealousy he has over his fame. In Judgment, Shintani remains busy investigating the Mole case on his own apart from his friends which costs his life in the process at the hands of the culprit. Shintani's last calls and state of body help Yagami investigate the Mole case with new hints.

== Matsugane Family ==
=== Mitsugu Matsugane ===
Voiced by: Tomomichi Nishimura (Japanese); JB Blanc (English)

Mitsugu Matsugane (松金 貢, Matsugane Mitsugu) is the patriarch of the Matsugane clan which is controlled in Judgment by Captain Kyohei Hamura as a result of a loss of money. Years before the story's beginning, Matsugane meets Yagami as he was battling a younger Kaito in the streets and decide to care for him alongside Genda. Although Hamura is the true mastermind behind clan's problems, Matsugane feels guilty for this, leading to his sacrifice when the Mole tries to silence. Matsugane dies after being shot 3 times while using his body as a shield to protect Hamura.

=== Kyohei Hamura ===
The new character model for Hamura (left) and Pierre Taki's model before his removal

Voiced by: Pierre Taki (original), Miou Tanaka (revised) (Japanese); Fred Tatasciore (English)

Kyohei Hamura (羽村 京平, Hamura Kyōhei) is the captain of the Matsugane family. Early in Judgment, Hamura is suspected of being the criminal the Mole who has been killing several civilians. Although Yagami proves his innocence, Hamura is still suspected of helping the Mole in his works. This leads to several encounters between Hamura and Yagami, as the former tries to silence the latter leading to the point of a boss battle. Defeated, Hamura confesses his alliance with the Mole, especially his mondus operandi. When the Mole kills Matsugane, Hamura reveals that the Mole is Kuroiwa and later confesses the rest of his crimes.

After Pierre Taki, a Japanese actor whose voice and likeness had been used for the character of Hamura, was arrested for cocaine possession and use by officers of the Narcotics Control Department (NCD) of the Ministry of Health, Labour and Welfare. Sega did not comment on whether Taki's arrest would affect Judgment's Western release. According to the NCD, Taki had been under investigation since 2018 following tips from unnamed sources and was asked to submit a urine sample. After Taki's arrest, Ryu Ga Gotoku Studio producer Daisuke Sato tweeted that he would not allow Taki's arrest to interrupt the game's success or allow the actor's contribution to the game to be deleted. Sega later said that Taki's voice and likeness would be replaced, but the game's planned release date in the West on June 25, 2019, would remain unchanged. The character's new design was not based on any actor.

=== Toru Higashi ===
Voiced by: Yoshihisa Kawahara (Japanese); Steve Blum (English)

Toru Higashi (東 徹, Higashi Tōru) appears in Judgment as a member of the Matsugane clan who is conflicted over his attachment to the group and his sworn brother Kaito, who was forced to abandon the yakuza after Hamura's works. Higashi eventually becomes a boss character but later helps Yagami and Kaito in solving the Mole case. In Lost Judgment, Higashi has left the yakuza and instead works as the manager of the arcade Charles (シャルル, Sharuru). He keeps his relationship with Kaito stable and often accompanies him to fights.

== Yokohama 99 ==
=== Makoto Tsukumo ===
Voiced by: Jun Miyamoto (Japanese); River Kanoff (English)

Makoto Tsukumo (九十九 誠一, Tsukumo Makoto) is a shut-in who first appears in Judgment as a close friend of Yagami and often helps him at solving cases. In Lost Judgment, Tsukumo moves to Isezaki Ijincho where he has become a detective alongside Sugiura. He remains on friendly terms with Yagami and Kaito.

=== Fumiya Sugiura ===
Voiced by: Junta Terashima (Japanese); Mark Whitten (English)

Fumiya Sugiura (杉浦 文也, Sugiura Fumiya), real name Fumiya Terasawa (寺澤 文也, Terasawa Fumiya), first appears in Judgment as a delinquent from Kamurocho. Upon meeting Yagami, he displays an interest in his work and both become allies. Later in the game, Sugiura confesses his true identity as Terasawa's brother who wants to reveal his sister's murderer's identity. By Lost Judgment, Sugiura has moved to Isekai Ijincho to help Tsukumo in their own work while still helping Yagami. He is in love with Yagami.

== Others ==
=== Mafuyu Fujii ===
Voiced by: Risa Shimizu (Japanese); Cherami Leigh (English)

Mafuyu Fujii (藤井 真冬, Fujii Mafuyu) is a public prosecutor and a past lover of Yagami. She is a close friend of the members from Genda Law as well as Yagami and Kaito. Although Shirosaki often tried to make Mafuyu and Yagami date, none of them ever decide to take such initiative. Nagoshi said that although was a larger focus on romance, it was cut out as he thought it would affect the courtroom thriller feel.

=== Kazuki Soma ===
Voiced by: Hiroshi Tamaki (Japanese); Matthew Yang King (English)

Kazuki Soma (相馬 和樹, Sōma Kazuki) is one of the main antagonists of Lost Judgment and the leader of RK (Red Knife, full term of RK). who initially aid Kuwana. Hiroshi Tamaki focused on realism when recording, comparing the entire game with a film. His first work in video game, the actor found it as an "out-of-body" experience. He described Soma as looking like "aloof" and "clearly perceptive" but hides a true persona he wanted the fans to look forward in the game.

=== Yoji Shono ===
Voiced by: Makoto Nagai (Japanese); Michael Gough (English)

Yoji Shono (生野 洋司, Shōno Yōji) is a researcher at the Advanced Drug Development Center. Despite his calm personality, Shono is one of the masterminds behind the Mole case, having experimented a drug AD-9 to cure Alzheimer's. However, the sideeffects of AD-9 lead to the death of the patient Koichi Waku and the nurse Emi, which would result on Yagami quitting his work. Upon discovering Shono was behind Terasawa's death, Yagami tries to expose Shono who kills himself with his own drug.

=== Ryusuke Kido ===
Voiced by: Hiroshi Shirokuma (Japanese); Andrew Morgado (English)

Ryusuke Kido (木戸 隆介, Kido Ryūsuke) is the Director of the Advanced Drug Development Center (ADDC for short). He appears as man proud of the AD-9 whom the player must attract while controlling Shirosaki in order to help Yagami obtain information about the Mole's identity and solve the case. After being captured by Yagami, Kido confesses his crimes in court.

=== Mitsuru Kuroiwa ===
Voiced by: Shosuke Tanihara (Japanese); Matthew Mercer (English)

Mitsuru Kuroiwa (黒岩 満, Kuroiwa Mitsuru) is a detective under the Tokyo Metropolitan Police Department's Organized Crime Division. Initially, he investigates the case of the Mole in Judgment, suspecting Kazuya Ayabe for being a dirty cop but in true he is the criminal referred to Yagami known as the Mole. When Hamura exposes his identity to Yagami, the protagonist faces Kuroiwa several times at the ADDC but loses and is shot by the police.

=== Kazuya Ayabe ===
Voiced by: Kenichi Takitoh (Japanese); Matthew Yang King (English)

Kazuya Ayabe (綾部 和也, Ayabe Kazuya) is a cop working for the Tokyo Metropolitan Police Department who provides Yagami with information in regards to several cases in Judgment. These actions led to Ayabe's arrest after the Mole leaves his own gun in Shintani's dead body as a means to stop him from revealing information. After Yagami solves the Mole case, Ayabae is freed.

=== Jin Kuwana ===
Voiced by: Koji Yamamoto (Japanese); Todd Haberkorn (English)

Jin Kuwana (桑名 仁, Kuwana Jin), also known by his birth name, Yu Kitakata (喜多方 悠, Kitakata Yū), is a character appearing in Lost Judgment as an ally to Yokohama 99 and, in the process, Yagami and Kaito. During the narrative it is revealed that Kuwana has killed bullies in his own group which leads to his rivalry with Yagami who wants him sent to jail. Although Yagami defeats Kuwana, he finds it impossible to bring proper justice as he fears Kuwana might be killed instead. Koji Yamamoto, Kuwana's Japanese voice, said he was fascinated by the work, especially since it was his debut in a video game. He was surprised by Kuwana and the narrative due to how Kuwana's role changes.

== Reception ==
Early impressions of the cast of Judgment were positive. Because it introduced a new cast instead of reusing characters, GameInformer found the story "refreshing" and described Yagami's investigations as intriguing. GameSpot praised the storyline, particularly Yagami and Kaito, calling them "genuinely likable characters". Engadget enjoyed both the main character and the multiple sidecases the game offers as it helps to explore the supporting cast as well as civilians living in Kamurocho. RPGamer found the entire cast stands out to the ones featured in the Yakuza series with sidequests having also different tones as they range from dark to comical. VG247 lamented the handling of female characters, especially Saori Shirosaki due to how her role in the first game is to provide comic relief in the form charming a man to the point it felt like fanservice in an anime. In retrospective, the writer lamented how the studio kept downplaying the role of female characters ever since the Yakuza series those games also sidelined the female characters with the exception of Kaoru Sayama from Yakuza 2.

Both CGMagazine and GameSpot felt that the sequel had Yagami struggle with the themes of whether or not the lead is able to deal justice by himself. Additionally, the subplot of Yagami working in a school attracted positive response by the same publication due to how fun it becomes. Computer Games Magazine stated that the two antagonists Kuwana and Soma pose as interesting characters, they do it at the expense of returning members from the first game who do little in comparison, Although he does not team up with Kaito many times in the sequel, GameSpot felt that Yagami became a more likable character in the sequel and is able to deliver emotional scenes properly. Inverse in particular enjoyed the character of Amasawa, calling her one of the best written female characters Ryu Ga Gotoku Studios has ever created due to her personality and dynamic with Yagami to the point she might be a break out character.

In regards to the DLC, RPGSite enjoyed the narrative, mostly praising the handling of Kaito as a protagonist. Mako Reactor also found it accessible as a result of not referencing previous events from the story and found the content more enjoyable than Goro Majima's sidestory from Yakuza Kiwami 2 which gave a major role to such character. Crispin Freeman and Suzie Yeung's performances were also the subject of praise.

VideoGamer's reviewer liked the original Japanese cast's striking performances, despite the reviewer's initial preference for the English dub. The English voice actors' performances were praised; Ogilvie called the game's English voice acting "excellent" but noticed inconsistent English lip-syncing. EGM Now said Chun gave a more striking performance than Kimura, whom the writer did not find suitable for the character. RPGamer awarded the first game "Best Voice Acting" GameSpot and Collider praised the presentation in terms of graphics, character renders and two districts Yagami can visit. The latter also praised both Japanese and English voice actors for giving good deliveries though the lypsinced are more appropriate in Japanese unless a cutscene is played. Shack News also noted the voice actors, most notably Yagami's Takuya Kimura and Greg Chun, to give appealing works most notably when playing a serious scene. Besides enjoying Yagami's actors, Metro also felt that Kaito and Soma's actors deliver strong performance regardless of language. In the 2022 "Famitsu Dengeki Game Awards", the game the "Best Actor Award" for Kimura's performance as Yagami.
