= Kamurochō =

Fictional district of Tokyo

- Yakuza location
- The red gate landmark of Kamurochō's Tenkaichi Street, as it appears in Yakuza 6: The Song of Life
- First appearance: Yakuza (2005)
- Created by: Toshihiro Nagoshi

In-universe information
- Type: District of Tokyo
- Characters: Yakuza characters Judgment characters

Kamurochō (Japanese: 神室町) is a fictional district of Tokyo from Sega's Yakuza media franchise. It is modelled after Kabukichō, Tokyo's renowned red-light district and entertainment precinct situated in Shinjuku ward. Like its real world counterpart, there are many retail shops, izakaya, restaurants, and mizu shōbai establishments like host and hostess clubs, soaplands, casinos and nightclubs within the district. Kamurochō has appeared as the primary setting in most Yakuza main series titles and several spin-off games, as well as adaptations of the franchise in other media.

A constant fixture of Sega's interactive urban planning across the franchise's in-universe continuity, Kamurochō has been cited as a notable example of an effective, flexible cityscape primed for "virtual tourism". Kamurochō has been well received by critics and the video game community, with praise for the level of detail and believability of each iteration of the district since the release of the first Yakuza in 2005.

== Concept and design ==
In-game (Yakuza Kiwami 2)

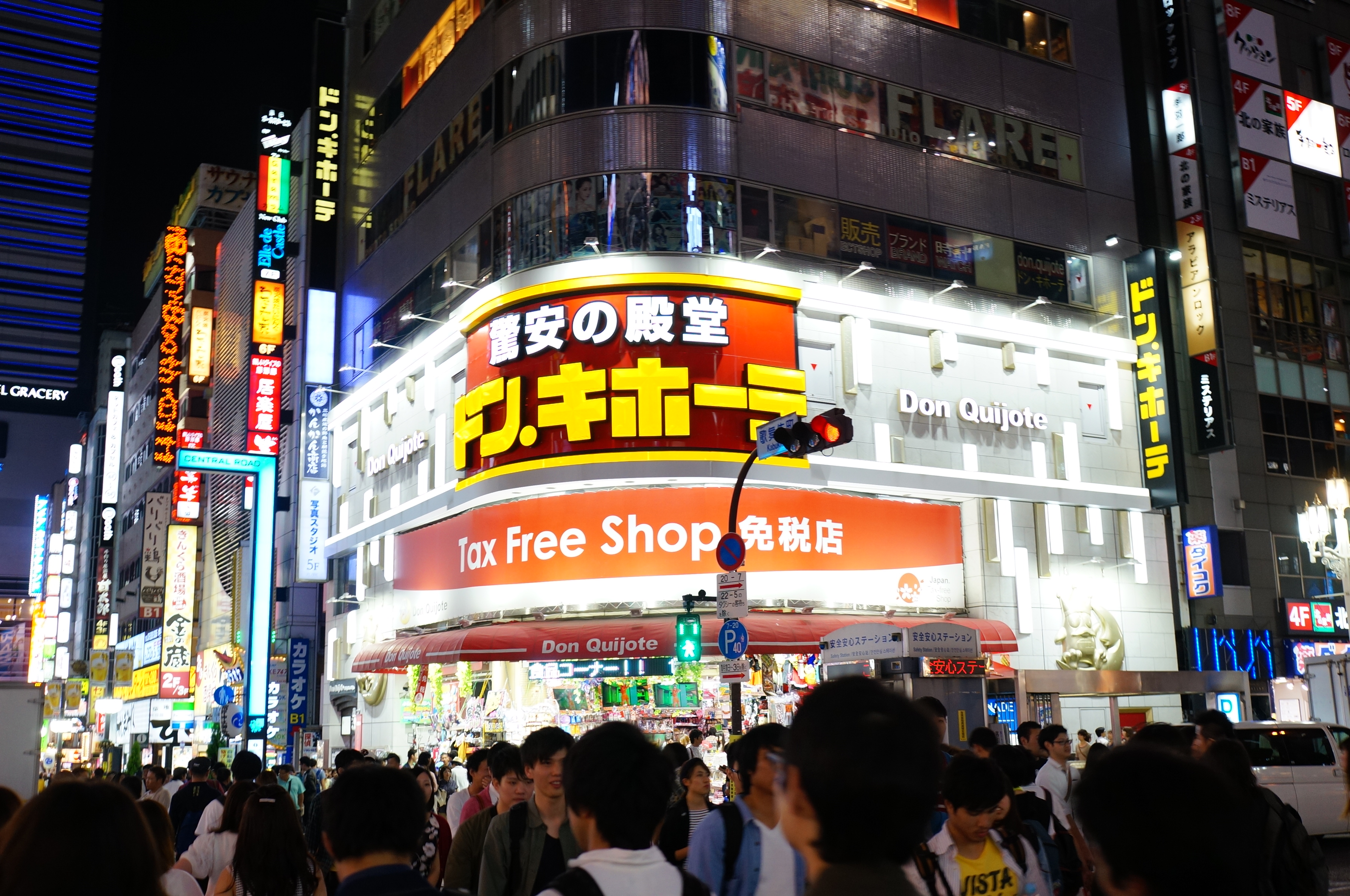
Actual

Comparing the Don Quijote store in Kamurochō (top), and its real-life equivalent in Kabukichō (bottom)

Kamurochō is modeled after Shinjuku ward's Kabukichō district. Executive producer and creator of the Yakuza franchise Toshiro Nagoshi wanted players to vicariously enjoy walking around the streets of Kamurochō through their player character or avatar. The developers emphasizes realism in their approach towards designing Kamurochō's landmarks and inhabitants. Some in-game buildings and locations, such as the Don Quijote discount store, Pronto cafe, and the Club Sega arcade game centers, are direct recreations of its real life counterparts and are situated in their accurate locations. Other locations are unambiguous and deliberate close approximations, such as Kamuro Theater in place of Shinjuku Koma Theater, or Shinjuku Mach Bowl where Milano Bowl is supposed to be situated.

Producer Masayoshi Kikuchi and writer Hiroyuki Sakamoto, the primary author of the first Yakuza's side stories, supervised numerous aspects of the setting, from the district's neon signs and crowded streets to conversations with hostess club female employees. According to Kikuchi, Kabukichō is within an hour away from Sega's development office, so team members could make frequent short trips to take videos or photos for each game. Team members, led by Nagoshi, would also visit drinking establishments within the Roppongi and Kabukicho districts at least two or three nights each week and converse with people in the local area as part of their research. A frequent venue of interest for the team are hostess clubs, which are prominently featured in the franchise's games. Kikuchi said that aspects of the conversations involving hostess characters in the Yakuza franchise are lifted directly from his personal interactions with hostesses during the aforementioned trips. While conceding that Kabukichō in more recent times has few areas that he would consider to be dangerous, Kikuchi noted that feedback from the Japanese public is predominantly positive, and claimed that a local club owner was full of praise for the realistic recreation of the Kabukichō area and its residents after playing the first Yakuza game during an interview with a media publication.

Sega has engaged in extensive tie-in advertising campaigns and product placements with Japanese brands and companies which are prominently displayed throughout Kamurochō. This includes in-game advertising material for several Japanese brands, branded beverage products found in Kamurochō's nightlife establishments, and Boss Coffee vending machines which offer the sale of beverages using in-game currency. Sega originally faced difficulty securing collaborations with established companies for product placement due to the real-world cultural stigma surrounding yakuza culture as well as the mature nature of the video game series' content, though Suntory emerged as one of the series' early supporters as the game's player demographic is perceived to be compatible with the whiskey-drinking demographic. Other notable brands which appear include Shogakukan's Sabra magazine, Fujisankei Communications Group's SPA! magazine and Panini Group's FIFA Club World Cup stickers.

== Appearances ==
=== Video games ===
Video games set in Kamurochō
2005	Yakuza
2006	Yakuza 2
2007
2008
2009	Yakuza 3
2010	Yakuza 4
2010	Kurohyō: Ryū ga Gotoku Shinshō
2011	Yakuza: Dead Souls
2012	Kurohyō 2: Ryū ga Gotoku Ashura Hen
2012	Yakuza 5
2013
2014
2015	Yakuza 0
2016	Yakuza Kiwami
2016	Yakuza 6: The Song of Life
2017	Yakuza Kiwami 2
2018	Ryū ga Gotoku Online
2018	Judgment
2019
2020	Yakuza: Like a Dragon
2020	Streets of Kamurocho
2021	Lost Judgment
2022
2023
2024	Like a Dragon: Infinite Wealth
2025
2026	Yakuza Kiwami 3
2026	Dark Ties

Kamurochō has appeared in every Yakuza main series title, beginning with the franchise's inaugural 2005 eponymous title. The district is introduced as the seat of power for the Tojo Clan (東城会, Tōjō-kai), the dominant yakuza organization in the Tokyo metropolitan area as well as the wider Kanto region of eastern Japan, its borders marking the organization's gang territory. The game's narrative follows ex-Tojo Clan member Kazuma Kiryu and his experiences within the district, marked by a time jump from 1995 to 2005 as a result of the character's decade-long incarceration in prison early in the game's story.

The explorable areas of Kamurochō are expanded in later sequels or remakes, beginning with Yakuza 4, to include rooftop areas, underground shopping arcades, basement car parks and sewer passageways, with players no longer confined to ground level areas as in earlier titles from the 2000s. Subsequent titles also introduce new districts situated within other Japanese metropolitan areas, though Kamurochō always plays a key story role.

Spin-off media which feature Kamurochō as an important setting include the Kurohyō sub-series which follows delinquent youth Tatsuya Ukyo; Yakuza: Dead Souls, which depicts several major characters confronting a zombie-infested Kamurochō; Ryū ga Gotoku Online, a mobile game which feature several story scenarios set within the district; and the Judgment video game sub-series, which stars private detective Takayuki Yagami. Streets of Kamurocho, a 2D brawler title patterned after the gameplay of the Streets of Rage series, saw a limited promotional release in 2020 to commemorate Sega's 60th anniversary.

The only two games in the series thus far to be set in the modern day and not feature Kamurochō are Like a Dragon Gaiden: The Man Who Erased His Name and Like a Dragon: Pirate Yakuza in Hawaii.

Players can engage in a multitude of mini-games at various locations in Kamurochō, the availability of which differs from title to title. Potential mini-games include karaoke, golf driving ranges, bowling, batting cages, darts, arcade video games, claw machines, table tennis, business management simulations, dating sim scenarios, and gambling activities such as pachinko and illegal casino games.

=== In other media ===
Kamurochō appears in adaptation works of the Yakuza franchise outside of the video game series. For the Japanese and Asian market releases of the original game in 2005, Sega created a pre-order campaign limited bonus item called Kamutai Magazine, a full-color magazine which was a travel guide to various locations within the district. Kamurochō is depicted in two live action movies, 2006's Like a Dragon: Prologue and 2007's Like a Dragon, as well as the television adaptation of the Kurohyō sub-series.

Several voice actors from the Yakuza series have performed in a radio drama known as Ryu Ga Gotoku Presents Kamuro-cho Radio Station (龍が如くPresents神室町RADIOSTATION). The second season Shin Kamuro-cho Radio Station (新・神室町RADIOSTATION), which covers 2009~2010, has episodes available for download as podcasts. The Kamurocho Caba Jou TV (神室町キャバ嬢 T V) is a Japanese web television dedicated to the series' cabaret club hostesses.

== Cultural impact ==
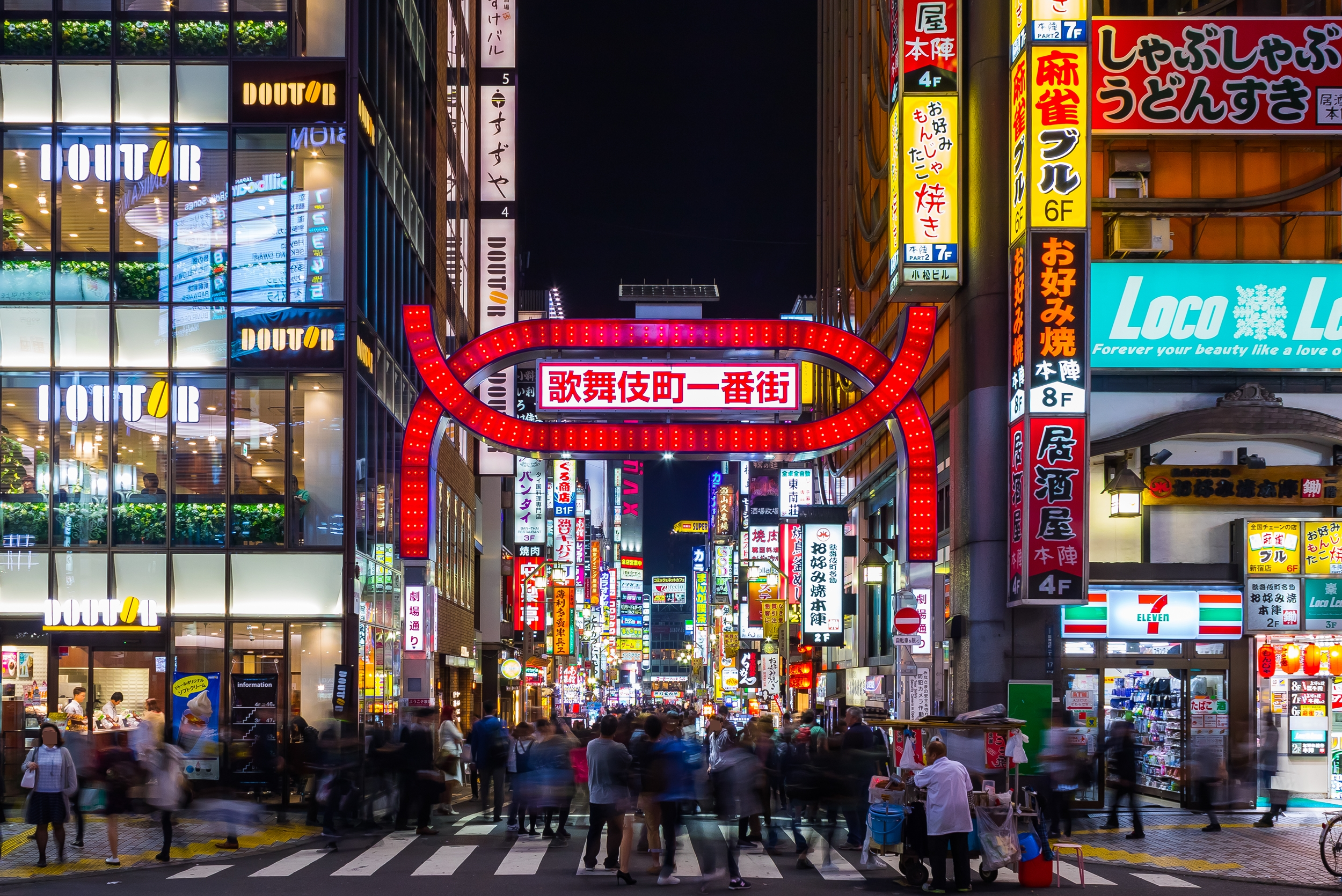
Kamurochō reproduces several of its real life equivalent's street layouts and landmarks, like the Ichiban-gai gate entrance.

Kamurochō has received acclaim from critics and the wider video game community for its authentic, and at times near-identical, recreation of Kabukichō's culture and sights. Daniel Robson from Japan Times claimed that Kabukichō is so realistically recreated in Kamurochō, "that real-life visitors may not need the on-screen map" if they are familiar with Kabukichō. A number of fans have been inspired to travel to Kabukichō after experiencing Kamurochō within the gameplay of the Yakuza video game series. Critics have described the phenomenon of exploring the representation of a real-life location within a virtual world as "virtual tourism". In 2016, a YouTube content creator started a video series which investigates the level of faithfulness behind Kamurochō's mirror of localities in Kabukichō.

=== Critical reception ===
Both Rock, Paper, Shotgun staff as well as Heather Alexandra from Kotaku considered Kamurochō to be one of the greatest video game locations. Several critics agree that while Kamurochō has remained a familiar constant in the franchise, even with the passage of time, plot developments in each succeeding title irreversibly transform specific localities within the district and ensure that the location is never quite the same from one game to the next.

Robson observed that the Yakuza franchise offers a "rich portrayal of central Tokyo in which players abroad can walk around and really engage". Writing for Kotaku, Alexandra explored the developers' technique of populating Kamurocho with potential threats, which in her view helps place an emphasis on the non-player characters encountered by the player character and encourage thorough exploration of the region. Gavin Greene praised the "layers" of sophisticated and involving design work behind Kamurochō, as well as the developers' "keen eye for constant, steady aesthetic refinement, and iterative design" which helped keep the setting relevant in video game culture. Alex Bosso from Playstation Lifestyle considered Kamurochō to be a character in its own right due to the immersion and “realistic feeling” it provides, singling out its iteration in Yakuza 0 as a series highlight. In response to the impending release of Yakuza: Like a Dragon and its apparent break from its predecessors over many of the franchise's conventions and traditions, Tyler Treese from GameRevolution lamented the possible reduction of Kamurochō's importance and prominence within series canon.

In his 2019 review of Judgment, Jeffrey Parkin from Polygon praised the friendship mechanic introduced by the game, where players could build friendships between player character Takayuki Yagami and various non-player characters within Kamurochō. Parkin said he felt invested and connected, and that Kamurochō is further enriched as a virtual world as a result. Giancarlo Valdes share a similar sentiment, and that Kamurochō's overall depiction in Judgment elevates it to one of the most realistic virtual tourism games. For Lost Judgment, Computer Games Magazine lamented Kamurochō was less entertaining to visit than Isezaki Ijincho (a fictional counterpart to Yokohama's Isezakichō district), while GameSpot still enjoyed visiting it.
