= Yakuza Kiwami 3 & Dark Ties =

2026 video game

- Developer: Ryu Ga Gotoku Studio (Note: Additional development work by Yuke's)
- Publisher: Sega
- Director: Ryosuke Horii
- Producers: Ryosuke Horii; Hiroyuki Sakamoto
- Writers: Masayoshi Yokoyama; Kazunobu Takeuchi (Note: Masayoshi Yokoyama is credited for the original story depicted in Yakuza 3. Kazunobu Takeuchi is credited for writing the "Dark Ties" storyline and new scenarios for the main game.)
- Composer: Saori Yoshida (Note: Saori Yoshida served as the game's music director, directing other composers Yasuyuki Nagata, Keitarou Hanada, Etsuko Shimada, Takenobu Mitsuyoshi, Shunsuke Minami, Makoto Tokuyama, Tomoyuki Tanaka, Hideki Onoue, Hideaki Kobayashi, Kenichi Tokoi, Yuri Fukuda, Ryo Fukuda, Homari Kawazu, Hyd Lunch, Satoshi Okamura, Hidenori Shoji, and Chihiro Aoki.)
- Series: Like a Dragon
- Platforms: Nintendo Switch 2; PlayStation 4; PlayStation 5; Windows; Xbox Series X/S
- Release: February 12, 2026
- Genres: Action-adventure, beat 'em up
- Mode: Single-player

Yakuza Kiwami 3 & Dark Ties is a 2026 action-adventure game developed by Ryu Ga Gotoku Studio and published by Sega. A part of the Like a Dragon series, the game comprises two distinct campaigns: Yakuza Kiwami 3, (Note: Known in Japan as Ryū ga Gotoku Kiwami 3 (Japanese: 龍が如く 極 3; lit. "Like a Dragon Extreme 3")) a remake of the 2009 video game Yakuza 3; and Dark Ties, (Note: Known in Japan as Ryū ga Gotoku 3 Gaiden: Dark Ties (Japanese: 龍が如く3 外伝 Dark Ties(ダークタイズ); lit. "Like a Dragon 3 Side Story: Dark Ties")) a spin-off title taking place before the events of Yakuza 3. As in the original game, Kiwami 3 continues the story of Kazuma Kiryu, following the events of Yakuza 2 and its remake Kiwami 2. Kiryu, after retiring from his life of crime to become an orphanage caretaker, is forced to protect his new family from the threats of Japan's underworld. Dark Ties stars Yoshitaka Mine, a major antagonist of Yakuza 3, and chronicles his rise to power as a yakuza.

The game was released for Nintendo Switch 2, PlayStation 4, PlayStation 5, Windows, and Xbox Series X/S, on February 12, 2026. The game received mixed reviews from critics, with praise for the improved gameplay mechanics and Dark Ties's story, but criticism towards the visuals, altered story and removed content from Yakuza 3, and the length of Dark Ties.

== Gameplay ==
In Yakuza Kiwami 3 & Dark Ties, players control the respective protagonist of each title, Kazuma Kiryu and Yoshitaka Mine, as they explore the towns of Kamurochō, Tokyo, and Downtown Ryukyu, Okinawa (the latter exclusive to Kiwami 3). Both titles utilize a beat 'em up combat system. In Kiwami 3, Kiryu has access to two fighting styles: the "Dragon of Dojima: Kiwami" style, which is said to be the ultimate evolution of his classic combat style from previous Like a Dragon games, and the "Ryukyu" style, a weapons-based style inspired by traditional Okinawan martial arts. In Dark Ties, Mine has access to a singular boxing-based fighting style, but he can also trigger a "Dark Awakening" mode, allowing him to perform more powerful, relentless combo attacks.

Kiwami 3 features a number of side activities for Kiryu to partake in. One such activity is called "Bad Boy Dragon", in which Kiryu is tasked with building a delinquent gang and assisting the local Okinawan women-only group, the Haisai Girls. Also featured in Kiwami 3 is "Life at Morning Glory", an expansive side story comprising various minigames in which Kiryu partakes to help out the children at his orphanage. Progression in this mode unlocks additional storylines with the children. As with previous Like a Dragon games, Kiwami 3 features "substories" where Kiryu can interact with a variety of non-playable characters (NPCs) and engage in scenarios outside of the main story. Dark Ties also features activities unique to the game, including the "Hell's Arena" mode, an underground fight club where Mine can engage in combat against a variety of enemies under different rule sets; and "Kanda Damage Control", a set of side missions and challenges that Mine can undertake to progress a rank system and improve the reputation of his yakuza boss.

For the first time in the franchise, players can access emulated versions of 12 Game Gear games, including a selection of Bandai Namco games, available in both Kiwami 3 and Dark Ties. These include Columns, Fantasy Zone Gear, Galaga '91, The G.G. Shinobi, G-LOC: Air Battle, Mappy, Pac-Man, Puyo Puyo, Sonic Chaos, Sonic Drift, Streets of Rage, and Woody Pop.

== Plot ==
=== Yakuza Kiwami 3 ===
Following the end of the Tojo Clan-Omi Alliance war in late 2006, (Note: As depicted in Yakuza 2 (2006) and Yakuza Kiwami 2 (2017).) former yakuza Kazuma Kiryu (Takaya Kuroda/Yong Yea) retires to Ryukyu, Okinawa where he takes over the Morning Glory Orphanage and raises a group of nine children. However, when his new home is under threats of eviction, Kiryu finds himself in the middle of a new conflict between Japan's underworld and the official government, facing new allies and enemies, including: Shigeru Nakahara (Ryo Ishibashi/Jesse Corti), patriarch of the local Okinawan group Ryudo Family; Rikiya Shimabukuro (Show Kasamatsu/Zeno Robinson), captain of the Ryudo Family; Daigo Dojima (Satoshi Tokushige/Roger Craig Smith), the newly appointed sixth chairman of the Tokyo-based Tojo Clan; and Tojo Clan lieutenants Yoshitaka Mine (Nakamura Shidō II/Daman Mills), Tsuyoshi Kanda (Hiroyuki Miyasako/Nick Gligor), and Goh Hamazaki (Teruyuki Kagawa/George Ackles).

In the original ending of Yakuza 3, Mine sacrifices himself to save Kiryu and Daigo from the terrorist Andre Richardson (Charles Glover/Fred Tatasciore) by tackling the latter off the roof of Touto University Hospital, leading to their presumed deaths; a vengeful Hamazaki later confronts Kiryu in Kamurocho and stabs him, before he is subdued by Kiryu's friends Kazuki (Hiroshi Tsuchida/Christopher Sean) and Yuya (Kenta Miyake/Patrick Seitz). In Kiwami 3, it is revealed that Mine survives the fall, and he later stops Hamazaki before the latter could face Kiryu. Speaking to Hamazaki in private, Mine asserts that both of them have lost to Kiryu and his love for his foster children; Mine also believes Kiryu's decision to retire to Okinawa is a form of self-imposed exile, and that he is living a lie by choosing to hide his true violent nature. They conclude that Kiryu must be prevented from returning to Kamurocho in the future to help out the Tojo Clan whenever he is needed. Mine also convinces Hamazaki to join him in meeting "the Fixer", (Note: Also known as Minoru Daidoji, who appeared in Yakuza 6: The Song of Life (2016).) a mysterious influential individual who has a task for the both of them.

=== Dark Ties ===
In 2007, startup entrepreneur Yoshitaka Mine is voted out of his company's board of directors due to his reckless investments, leaving him feeling betrayed by his subordinates. Mine later encounters a public shootout between members of the Tojo Clan and a rival yakuza gang, the former protecting their chairman Daigo Dojima. Seeking to understand why the Tojo men were willing to sacrifice their lives for Daigo, Mine attempts to join the Tojo Clan by establishing a relationship with Tsuyoshi Kanda, a member of the Nishikiyama Family subsidiary who is recently released from prison. Following an initially hostile encounter, Mine bribes Kanda with a large sum of money, allowing him to be introduced in the family.

Using aggressive tactics, Mine helps Kanda expand the Nishikiyama Family's territory and headcount by taking over various properties and absorbing smaller families. The duo's success causes conflict with Shinpei Ikari (Kenji Matsuda/John Eric Bentley), the family's acting patriarch, who eventually dispatches a hitman to kill Kanda, but fails. Mine and Kanda set Ikari up to take the fall for an illicit arms deal, leading to him becoming wanted by the police and being expelled from the family. Kanda becomes third patriarch in Ikari's place, with Mine as his right-hand man. Mine's activities attract the attention of Daigo, who warns him that his methods are against the yakuza's moral code and could get him killed. Mine, however, dismisses Daigo's numerous advice as mere platitudes.

During a mission to transport money to the clan headquarters, Mine and Kanda are ambushed by Ikari and men from several families Mine had poached. Outnumbered, Kanda decides to abandon Mine and drive away with the money. Daigo intervenes in the conflict, offering to pay Ikari a billion yen in exchange for Mine's life, and even taking a bullet for him. An enraged Mine defeats Ikari, then later calls an ambulance for Daigo. Following this encounter, Daigo appoints Mine chairman of his own subsidiary, the Hakuho Clan, allowing him to distance himself from Kanda. Mine, having a newfound respect and admiration for Daigo, realizes that the yakuza has what he has been searching for: true bond between men.

In 2009, several months following Mine's presumed death, Daigo returns to a bar where he once shared a drink with Mine, and laments over his sacrifice. Mine, observing Daigo from outside the bar, pays his respects then walks away. As he reflects on his near-death experience, it is revealed that a hedge on the hospital's ground floor cushioned Mine's fall, leaving him only severely injured, while a man (Note: Identified off-screen as Yoshimura, a Daidoji agent who first appeared in Like a Dragon Gaiden: The Man Who Erased His Name (2023).) later found his body and presumably saved him. Musing to himself, Mine affirms that his former self is dead, and he is now nothing more than "another man who erased his name".

== Development ==
The development of Yakuza Kiwami 3 was first alluded to by the head of Ryu Ga Gotoku Studio, Masayoshi Yokoyama, during a studio livestream in 2024. When discussing the then-unannounced upcoming title, Yokoyama stated that it was not Kiwami 3, but he assured that the team was going to make it "sooner or later".

On September 17, 2025, the studio's website was updated with a listing for "Yakuza Kiwami 3", which was promptly removed, leading to fans speculating that an announcement was imminent. A week later, Kiwami 3 was formally revealed at the studio's "RGG Summit" event, alongside Dark Ties. During the presentation, developers from the studio unveiled additional details about the game.

According to Yokoyama, both Kiwami 3 and Dark Ties were developed based on the concept "a legend is reborn and a new legacy begins". He elaborated that the development team approached making Kiwami 3 differently compared to the previous Like a Dragon remake projects, citing the difference in hardware gap between each original title and its Kiwami counterpart. Producer and director Ryosuke Horii explained that Kiwami 3 was rebuilt from the ground up, with additional cutscenes not present in the original Yakuza 3, as well as several old scenes having been changed drastically, promising different outcomes compared to the original story. Yokoyama further explained this point, stating that the core story remained unchanged, but the team was aiming to refine ambiguous or missing details in the original game. Horii also added that the team went back to adjust the actors' performance, in order to improve the delivery of the original cutscenes.

When comparing Kiwami 3 to Yakuza 3, Horii admitted that the original game had "many rough edges", and he and the development team approached the remake in the spirit of respecting the original title "without relying on it too much", explaining that having romanticized memories of past titles can cloud their judgment. As an example, Horii cited Yakuza 3's combat system, noting it as one of the hardest games to beat in the series, while also pointing out that the game engine has changed since the original release, and the number of games the team has developed since allowed them to modernize the system for Kiwami 3, justifying its existence. Horii also highlighted "Life at Morning Glory" as the "most essential content in [Kiwami 3]" and encouraged players to not skip this portion of the game, citing its importance in establishing Kazuma Kiryu as a fatherly figure to his foster children. He noted that even though Yakuza 3 depicted the bond between Kiryu and the children, the original story lacked depth, and Kiwami 3 was an opportunity for him and the team to expand on this aspect of Kiryu's character.

In contrast, Dark Ties was originally envisioned as a bonus scene for Kiwami 3; however, the development team decided to shift its scope to a full game, as they recognized Yoshitaka Mine's popularity with the fans and that making him playable was "the best way" to tell his story. The story of Dark Ties was written by Kazunobu Takeuchi, who originally wrote a story arc detailing Mine's past for the mobile title Ryu ga Gotoku Online (2018); the same story arc was used as the basis for Dark Ties, with Takeuchi expanding upon the original material by fleshing out Mine's backstory even further. Series chief producer Hiroyuki Sakamoto considered Dark Ties to have the darkest story out of all Like a Dragon entries to date, with it largely focusing on Mine's inner monologue and self-questioning, setting him apart from other series protagonists like Kiryu.

In a separate interview, Yokoyama stated that both Kiwami 3 and Dark Ties would contain hints about the future direction of the Like a Dragon series, which the players would get "a solid sense of" once they get to play the game. In February 2026, during a studio livestream, he elaborated on this, stating that Kiwami 3 would be the last title within the Kiwami series, and a new series with "a different meaning" would continue in its place, separate from the mainline titles.

== Reception ==
Reception

Aggregate scores
Aggregator	Score
Metacritic	NS2: 76/100; PS5: 74/100; Win: 73/100; XSXS: 79/100
OpenCritic	62% recommend (Note: Based on 120 reviews)

Review scores
Publication	Score
Game Informer	8/10
GameSpot	6/10
GamesRadar+	4/5
IGN	7/10
Push Square	8/10
Shacknews	6/10
TechRadar	3.5/5
Video Games Chronicle	2/5

Yakuza Kiwami 3 & Dark Ties received "mixed or average" reviews from critics for the PlayStation 5 and Windows versions, and "generally favorable" reviews for the Nintendo Switch 2 and Xbox Series X/S versions, according to the review aggregation website Metacritic. Fellow review aggregator OpenCritic assessed that the game received fair approval, being recommended by 62% of critics. A majority of reviews praised the improved gameplay mechanics in Kiwami 3 and the new narrative presented in Dark Ties, while criticisms were generally given toward the side content, visuals, changes made to the story of Kiwami 3 compared to Yakuza 3, and the short length of Dark Ties.

Writing for Game Informer, Michael Murphy noted that Kiwami 3 "continues the solid streak for Ryu Ga Gotoku and the series", praising the narrative and combat, while also highlighting Dark Ties for its depiction of Mine's relationship with other characters. Ultimately, Murphy concluded that the game continues to deliver what players enjoy, though it doesn't "raise the bar" in any way. Robert Ramsey of Push Square also gave praise to the narrative and combat elements of Kiwami 3, and added that Dark Ties elevates Mine to being a more intriguing personality, adding depth to his character; however, Ramsey noted that some of the more controversial elements, such as story changes and recasts, would "stain the experience" for many people.

In a more critical review, Ashley Schofield of Video Games Chronicle deems the game "a disappointing remake built on disdain, not reverence", citing issues such as the quality of Kiwami 3's combat styles and the removal of side content previously present in Yakuza 3, as well as Dark Ties's short runtime. Schofield also criticized the recasting of several characters, such as Show Kasamatsu's Rikiya and Teruyuki Kagawa's Hamazaki, deeming them inferior to the original performances in Yakuza 3. Lucas White of Shacknews similarly criticized Hamazaki's recasting, noting Kagawa's past sexual misconduct as "gross" and contrary to the franchise's image and themes.

=== Casting controversy ===
The casting of Teruyuki Kagawa in Yakuza Kiwami 3 as Hamazaki received criticism in the West due to the actor's sexual misconduct allegations towards women in 2019. Within the Yakuza fandom, Kagawa's inclusion was controversial, with some fans demanding that the actor be recast, under the banner of the hashtag "#REMOVEKAGAWA". Director Ryosuke Horii addressed the casting in an interview, stating that Kagawa had been chosen for the role because he was believable as "a creep" and that the studio was not concerned with any criticism for recasting the character. One fan of the series, speaking to Aftermath, said they felt Kagawa's casting showed a double standard at the studio considering actor Pierre Taki's recasting in previous series game Judgment following his arrest for cocaine use.
