= Goro Majima =

Recurring character in the Yakuza series

- Yakuza / Like a Dragon character
- Goro Majima as he appears in Yakuza: Like a Dragon (2020)
- First game: Yakuza (2005)
- Voiced by: Japanese; Hidenari Ugaki; English; Mark Hamill (2005); Matthew Mercer (2020–present)
- Portrayed by: Goro Kishitani (Like a Dragon); Shunsuke Kubozuka (Ryu ga Gotoku stage play); Munetaka Aoki (Like a Dragon: Yakuza); Yoshiyuki Yamaguchi (Ryu ga Gotoku Powered By Nihon Touitsu)

In-universe information
- Nationality: Japanese

Goro Majima (Japanese: 真島 吾朗, Hepburn: Majima Gorō) is a main character in Sega's Like a Dragon video game franchise, known as Yakuza outside of Japan. He first started off as one of the secondary antagonists of Yakuza, before becoming one of the main playable protagonists of Yakuza 0 and Yakuza: Dead Souls, as well as the main protagonist of the Majima Saga of Yakuza Kiwami 2 and Like a Dragon: Pirate Yakuza in Hawaii.

Introduced as a member of the Tojo Clan and patriarch of its subsidiary group, the Majima Family as well as second-in-command of the Shimano Family, nicknamed "Mad Dog of Shimano", he develops a sadomasochistic obsession with the protagonist Kazuma Kiryu. He continually seeks to fight him, seeing him as the perfect rival, but eventually bonds with him across the franchise and becomes an important ally of his. He is also the sworn brother of Taiga Saejima who is one of the protagonists of Yakuza 4 and Yakuza 5.

Majima's character is explored in more detail during the prequel Yakuza 0, in which he is a 24-year-old former Yakuza and a playable protagonist along with Kiryu. In this game, Majima has a much more calm and serious demeanor that develops into his standard sadomasochistic one during a war between a number of families in a fight for a patch of land known as the Empty Lot, while protecting the owner of the lot, Makoto Makimura, who serves as Majima's love interest. Majima also appears in the spin-off Dead Souls as well as the crossover Project X Zone 2.

Ryu Ga Gotoku Studio created Majima as a "clown" character who would contrast his calmer characterization in Yakuza 0, where the localization shifted Majima's character arc so he would not come across as insane.

Ever since his appearance, Majima has been critically acclaimed by many critics and fans alike, with Majima becoming a breakout character in the franchise, due to his crazy antics that had made him popular with the fanbase and even having earned a CD with all the songs Ugaki plays in his karaoke mini-games while topping a popularity poll. His character, story arc, and fighting style in Yakuza 0 were highly praised by critics.

== Creation and development ==
According to Scott Strichart, who handled localization and production on a number of Yakuza games, Majima is a bit of a "class clown"—someone with a "joker-esque personality"—which is opposite to his calm demeanor in the prequel. However, he noted that while fans felt that Majima went "insane", the Ryu Ga Gotoku Studio said that he "makes a conscious choice to... let loose". This was something the translators found challenging while localizing the game. Strichart pointed out that through Majima's interactions with Nishitani, he gains insight into how someone like that would live. The goal of the localization team was to make Majima and Kiryu more likeable with their changes, although Strichart believed Kiryu was more popular than Majima in Western countries. Strichart said that while fans might miss previous Yakuza characters like Kiryu and Majima, he hoped they would be receptive to Takayuki Yagami, the protagonist from the next game Judgment.

Series' producer Daisuke Sato said that ever since the release of Yakuza 0, Majima has become far more popular, to the point that many developers thought it was possible to create a new spin-off game focused around him.

== Appearances ==
=== Yakuza (2005) / Yakuza Kiwami (2015) ===
Goro Majima first appears in the original Yakuza game as a secondary antagonist, being the patriarch of the Majima Family and a lieutenant of Futoshi Shimano. Nicknamed "The Mad Dog of Shimano" (嶋野の狂犬, Shimano no Kyōken), he takes an interest in the protagonist Kazuma Kiryu because Kiryu refuses to fight him when provoked. This results in Majima spending the rest of the game's plot trying to goad Kiryu into fighting him just for fun.

The remake of the game, Yakuza Kiwami, further explores his rivalry with Kiryu, as well as adding further scenes where Majima stalks Kiryu, aiming to make his rival stronger through new fights. This led to a new system in the remake called the "Majima Everywhere", where Majima attacks Kiryu using a large variety of ways to ensure his rival fights backs. Kiryu becomes stronger each time Majima is defeated, but that also means Majima gets stronger as well, which makes him far more challenging the more he continues to attack Kiryu.

=== Yakuza 2 (2006) / Yakuza Kiwami 2 (2017) ===
During Yakuza 2—and its 2017 remake, Yakuza Kiwami 2, Majima left the Tojo Clan and forms his own criminal organization, the Majima Construction Company, which ran several construction rackets, along with an underground fighting arena and an illegal casino. Because of the looming threat of an invasion of Tokyo by the rival Yakuza organization, the Omi Alliance, Kiryu convinces Majima to ally with the Tojo Clan once again and provide the Majima Construction Company's support if a war breaks out. Though initially hesitant, Majima agrees after Kiryu beats him in a fight in his underground coliseum. Majima's crew ultimately proves instrumental in defending Tokyo against Omi attacks.

In the bonus episode "Majima Saga" featured in Kiwami 2, Majima's story between the events of Yakuza and Yakuza 2 is fleshed out further, where it is revealed that the Majima Family was disbanded to prevent bloodshed between the Tojo Clan and Omi Alliance, following a conflict incited by a Tojo officer, Kei Ibuchi. Majima also later reunites with Makoto during his investigation, where he learns that Makoto has formed a family. After disbanding his clan and leaving the Tojo Clan, Majima and remnants of his family formed his construction company, Majima Construction, takes over Purgatory, and beginning work on Kamurocho Hills.

=== Yakuza 3 (2009) ===
During Yakuza 3, Kiryu pleads with Majima once more to go back to the Tojo Clan and support the newly appointed Sixth Chairman, Daigo Dojima, as a contingency against any future troubles. Sometime later, Majima is blackmailed by Goh Hamazaki as a suspect in the clan's internal dispute.

=== Yakuza 4 (2010) ===
In Yakuza 4, Majima follows the trail of Yasuko Saejima, determined to protect her on behalf of Taiga Saejima. Majima tells Shun Akiyama of Sky Finance that he is looking for Yasuko to protect her and to make amends with Saejima. On his way to see Majima, Kiryu, having returned to Kamurocho, witnesses Majima's arrest and calls out to him. Majima tells him that it was Daigo Dojima who set him up. Afterwards, Majima is released from prison and joins Kiryu in welcoming Saejima back to the Tojo Clan.

=== Yakuza 5 (2012) ===
In Yakuza 5, Majima is in negotiations with the Tsukimino branch of the Omi Alliance under Dojima's orders to help put a stop to the rising tensions between the two clans. Despite his claims he wants peace, Tsubasa Kurosawa orders assassins to kill Majima mid-negotiation, which he survives, but is kidnapped. Majima reveals that the reason he was unable to resist Kurosawa was the threat to Haruka at her debut concert as an idol.

=== Yakuza 0 (2015) ===
The prequel Yakuza 0 provides additional backstory for Majima, presenting a different and much more controlled version of the character years prior to his first appearance. It is revealed that he was thrown out of the Shimano Family for attempting to aid his sworn brother Saejima in an attack on the Ueno Seiwa Clan, which landed the latter in prison with the death penalty. Majima was tortured for a year and his left eye gouged out, after which he was handed over to Shimano's sworn brother Tsukasa Sagawa in the Omi Alliance. Sagawa forces Majima to manage the Cabaret Grand in Sotenbori, Osaka, where he is nicknamed by the locals the "Lord of the Night" due to his managerial acumen and proven success in turning the club's fortunes around. Wishing to return to his yakuza roots, Majima gets the opportunity to make a comeback by killing a blind masseuse known as Makoto Makimura. However, he accidentally bonds with Makimura and is unable to kill her. Working to protect her, he learns that Makimura is caught up in the dispute for the "Empty Lot," a piece of real estate in Kamurocho sought by members of the Tojo Clan and Omi Alliance for its importance in a hugely valuable real estate deal. Majima manages to protect Makimura and rejoins the Shimano Family, but he distances himself from her as he returns to his yakuza life, hoping Makimura enjoys a peaceful life instead.

=== Yakuza 6: The Song of Life (2016) ===
In Yakuza 6: The Song of Life, Majima plays a minor role in the story. Following the events of Yakuza 5, when a fire breaks out in Little Asia and destroys it, Majima and Daigo are arrested by the police on suspicion of having orchestrated the event. In 2017, Majima, alongside Saejima and Daigo, are released from prison after Kiryu made a deal with an unnamed politician in exchange for his silence in the Onomichi scandal, as well as his service to the Daidoji faction. The three of them, unaware of Kiryu's survival, proceeds to carry out his will and forms a partnership with the Yomei Alliance in Hiroshima.

=== Yakuza: Like a Dragon (2020) / Like a Dragon Gaiden: The Man Who Erased His Name (2023) ===
In Yakuza: Like a Dragon and Like a Dragon Gaiden: The Man Who Erased His Name, it is revealed the Tojo Clan was targeted by the new Governor of Tokyo, Ryo Aoki. Majima, Saejima and Daigo met with one of the family captains, Masumi Arakawa, to discuss a plan. Arakawa would pretend to betray the clan and leak secrets to the police, while the other three escape and go into hiding. Arakawa would join the ranks of the Omi Alliance, where he would become its acting captain after Masaru Watase was arrested for an unrelated incident. Majima attends a private meeting in Omi Alliance HQ, where Watase would make his first appearance following his release, and announce the dissolution of both the Omi Alliance and Tojo Clan, alongside Daigo. Prior to the meeting, Majima and Saejima encounter Ichiban Kasuga and his party, and dueled with them out of boredom. Arakawa and Daigo stopped them, and informed Kasuga of their plan. The next day, Watase arrived at the Omi HQ, and proceeded to make his announcement, inciting a riot among the Omi members. Majima, joined by Saejima, Arakawa, and Kasuga and his party, battles the rioting Omi members. Amidst the fight, Kiryu makes an appearance as Watase's bodyguard, to Majima's excitement.

After the team defeated the Omi members, Majima, Saejima, Daigo, Watase, Kiryu, and Watase Family captain Yuki Tsuruno left the premise, but they were stopped by Watase's lieutenant Kosei Shishido, who was against the dissolution plan. An enraged Shishido rallied the remaining Omi Alliance members to surround them, but ultimately he was defeated by Kiryu and detained by Daidoji agents. Sometimes later, Majima, Saejima and Daigo attended Arakawa and Aoki's funeral. The latter offered Kasuga a chance to join his new security firm, formed alongside Watase, but he declined.

=== Like a Dragon: Infinite Wealth (2024) ===
Some time after establishing the security firm is formed, Majima, Saejima and Daigo were forced to close their business, as members of the firm were gradually exposed by the VTuber Hisoka Tatara for their criminal pasts. With their reputation in ruins, the trio retreated to a remote village where they became fishermen, living out their lives in complete isolation from the world. In December 2023, the trio were visited by Kiryu, who revealed to them that he had cancer with only a short time to live, while also telling them of his ongoing mission to support Kasuga, who was in Honolulu, Hawaii at the time. Kiryu requested the trio to lend their strength in supporting Jo Sawashiro and taking down the Seiryu Clan chairman Masataka Ebina, but they refused. Afterwards, Kiryu mocked their pride, triggering them into fighting him and his allies. In the ensuing fight, the trio begged Kiryu not to throw his life away, but he left them behind.

Much later, as Kiryu and his friends stormed Millenium Tower in Kamurocho to confront Ebina, Majima, Saejima, and Daigo joined them to help them defeat the Seiryu clansmen. After clearing out the henchmen, the trio joined Kiryu just as he delivered a final blow to Ebina, and witnessed him collapse from exhaustion. They watched Kiryu's friends escort him into a helicopter as they flew away to a hospital.

=== Like a Dragon: Pirate Yakuza in Hawaii (2025) ===
Majima once again serves as the main protagonist in Like a Dragon: Pirate Yakuza in Hawaii. Set six months after the events of Infinite Wealth, Pirate Yakuza in Hawaii sees Majima washed on up on Rich Island with amnesia and leads him into battle with pirate yakuza as he attempts to regain his memory. Majima ultimately becomes captain of a pirate crew as he gets wrapped up in a hunt for a lost pirate treasure, while forming a close bond with a boy named Noah Rich. When nearing the treasure, Majima regains his memory and once the treasure is found, he returns to Japan. Here he visits Kiryu in hospital, where he reveals that he'd been looking for the treasure because of a rumour it contained an elixir said to extend the lifespan of the person that consumes it, Majima hoping he could use it to help Kiryu. Despite not finding the elixir, he promises to tell Kiryu about his adventures as a pirate.

=== Spinoffs and other appearances ===
Outside of the main Yakuza series, Majima is playable in Yakuza: Dead Souls, fighting against an army of zombies. Majima's avatar is used in Ryū ga Gotoku Ishin! and its 2023 remake for the samurai Okita Sōji. He also appears alongside Kiryu in the crossover game Project X Zone 2, as well as Binary Domain. He appears as a playable racer in Sonic Racing: CrossWorlds via free downloadable content.

In the film Like a Dragon, an adaptation of the first game, he is portrayed by Goro Kishitani. In the Ryu ga Gotoku stage play, he is portrayed by Shunsuke Kubozuka. Munetaka Aoki portrayed Majima in the TV series Like a Dragon: Yakuza, while Yoshiyuki Yamaguchi portrays Majima in a separate live-action series, Ryu ga Gotoku Powered By Nihon Touitsu, a collaboration between the Like a Dragon franchise and the drama series Nihon Touitsu, the latter of which Yamaguchi stars in.

Majima has also made an appearance as a crossover skin in Tom Clancy's Rainbow Six Siege for Japanese defending operator Echo.

Majima also appears in a limited-time DLC for Dave the Diver, and as a DLC boss in Shinobi: Art of Vengeance.

== Critical reception ==
Goro Majima has been popular with the Yakuza fanbase. His songs performed during his appearances were collected in 2017 on a CD titled Goro Majima's Best Hits. In a 2018 popularity poll, Majima was voted the most popular Yakuza character. GameInformer also listed him as the best main character in 2017 based on his characterization from Yakuza 0. Several writers enjoyed the character's fighting style in Yakuza 0, finding him more interesting than Kiryu. GameSpot highly praised Majima's character arc in that game for changing into the narrative, as well as how many allies and enemies he makes. Similarly, IGN liked the handling of Majima's and Kiryu's storylines, finding them simple in contrast to the ones in Yakuza 5, which the website deemed convoluted. Polygon stated that Majima was quite different from his portrayal in the regular games in the series because his story was set in the past. A similar comment was made by PlayStation Life Style because both Majima and Kiryu change across the plot of this prequel. The Jimquisition said that both characters were "like-able protagonists who consistently have to act as straight men in a variety of weird situations".

Oyungezer regarded Majima as Kiryu's opposite due to their constrasting characterization yet at the same time more appealing. In contrast, his appearance before he got the nickname "Mad Dog" and gave it his due was very different, he was running a casino with his gentlemanly attitude. He was always being used by his troublesome customers, and even tolerated people pushing him around. Ultimately, Majima is freed from his forced servitude, and realizes that he wants to choose the right thing when conflicted between his duties and his rights He swore to live the way he wanted to live from now on, adopting a new persona that gave him the title Mad Dog of Shimano. The writer claims that Majima's craziness is actually a mask that hides his serious persona carefully. Real Sound compared Majima to Revolver Ocelot from Metal Gear considering the mix of inexperience and depth both undergo across the narrative while encountering their respective games. His nature has been alive and well since his first appearance in Yakuza, and soon after reuniting with Kiryu, who has just been released from prison after serving a 10-year sentence, he starts fights in all sorts of situations. His constant approaches, calling out "Kiryu-chan!" and spouting off in a strange Kansai dialect, is strangely terrifying yet endearing. Meanwhile, Majima's depth is further explored in the prequel Yakuza 0.

Destructoid enjoyed the comical characterization in Yakuza Kiwami because of his constant interactions with Kiryu. Game Informer noted despite not being playable with his longer screen time Majima manages to aid the player to make Kiryu a stronger fighter. However, they were highly critical of his different personality in Kiwami, calling it "jarring", and added that Yakuza 0 failed to close this character arc. While calling him "Zero's standout character", GameSpot stated that they enjoyed these interactions, as it added more side content to the remake of the first game. IGN referred to this take of Majima as "lovably weird" based on his traits. Polygon criticized Majima's fights for lacking the challenge seen in regular boss fights. They added that "Majima's constant intervention feels a little more ingrained in the story, providing some character depth that the original game lacked."

With Yakuza Kiwami 2, Destructoid criticized Majima's "overpowered" abilities, which players continuously pressed the same buttons to use them. Game Informer praised Majima's story in this game, as it helped to develop his change of character from Yakuza 0 further, while also finding his mini game refreshing because of how different it is from common regular fights. Game Revolution agreed, finding Majima's interactions with Makoto during his own side story provides further depth to the "fan favorite" character. Despite liking the character, GameSpot criticized him for lacking his own character progression during his chapters. The Gamer referred to Majima's narrative in Yakuza Kiwami 2 as a masterpiece due to how it expands on his role from Yakuza 0 by interacting with Makoto Makimura while expanding on his main role within the main series as the character often became a minor one. The writer went to compare Majima to Ciri from Witcher 3 due parallels between how both characters are expanded in the process.

Like a Dragon: Pirate Yakuza in Hawaii led to criticism by Aftermath for exaggerating Majima's comical traits through the amnesia as writer Luke Plunkett claims that in previous installments there was proper balance between Majima's seriousness and joker sides.

The 2019 adventure game Later Alligator features a character named "The Knife" who resembles Majima and makes several references to the Yakuza series.

=== Analysis ===
Caroline Almeida Santos from Universidade Federal de Santa Catarina and Philippe René Marie Humbl from Universiteit Brussel acknowledged that Sega's translation of Yakuza 0 was faithful to the original Japanese as Majima uses Japanese suffixes when interacting with others in order to further explore how important were his relationships. Majima generally uses polite expressions when working as a cabaret manager in early scenes, but when dealing with his yakuza he changes form and uses forms that reference his Kansai dialect. Sagawa treats Majima like a child whenever they talk which led Sega to keep the word "chan" which is commonly used in Japanese whenever there is an inimate or playful relationship. Claudia Bonillo Fenrnandes from Zaragorza University said Majima and Kiryu's roles in Yakuza 0 are similar to 1980s yakuza as in such period Kansai used to get into conflicts with Kanto. Majima's story also explores the traffic of firearms and later traffic of humans when he meets Makoto Makimura. Majima's idolatrion for Shimano's clan reflects a similar trend in Japanese movies which embodies the concept of manliness in the same fashion as how Kiryu and Nishikiyama wish to become yakuza like their guardian Kazama. However, the embodiement of violence present in the yakuza heavily affects Majima in the narrative to the point he tries as much he can to stop Makoto Makimura from getting involved with them. The brotherly love between Majima and his sworn brother Saejima in entire series noted by the writer to be popular enough within Japan to appeal to fans of boy's romance.
