= Yakuza 5 =

2012 video game

- Developer: Ryu Ga Gotoku Studio (Note: Ported to Windows by QLOC.)
- Publisher: Sega
- Directors: Kazuki Hosokawa; Masayoshi Yokoyama
- Producers: Masayoshi Kikuchi; Masayoshi Yokoyama
- Designer: Ryosuke Horii
- Programmer: Koji Tokieda
- Artist: Saizo Nagai
- Writers: Masayoshi Yokoyama; Koji Yoshida
- Composers: Mitsuharu Fukuyama; Hidenori Shoji; Takeshi Isozaki; Chihiro Aoki; Hyd Lunch; ZENTA
- Series: Yakuza
- Platforms: PlayStation 3; PlayStation 4; Windows; Xbox One
- Release: PlayStation 3: JP: December 5, 2012; WW: December 8, 2015; PlayStation 4: JP: June 20, 2019; WW: February 11, 2020; Windows, Xbox One: WW: January 28, 2021
- Genres: Action-adventure, beat 'em up
- Mode: Single-player

Yakuza 5 (Note: Japanese: 龍が如く5 夢、叶えし者, Hepburn: Ryū ga Gotoku Faibu: Yume, Kanaeshi Mono; lit. "Like a Dragon 5: Fulfiller of Dreams") is a 2012 action-adventure game developed by Ryu Ga Gotoku Studio and published by Sega for the PlayStation 3. It is the fifth main entry in the Yakuza series. The game was released in December 2012 in Japan, and localized for North America, Europe and Australia as a PlayStation Network download in December 2015. A remaster with improved resolution and frame rate was released for the PlayStation 4 on June 20, 2019, in Japan, and worldwide on February 11, 2020, as part of The Yakuza Remastered Collection. Versions for Windows and Xbox One were released in January 2021.

The game features a new game engine, unlike previous games in the series that have been re-utilizing the same engine since Ryū ga Gotoku Kenzan!. For the first time in the series, it features five settings across Japan along with five playable main characters. Yakuza 5 was followed up by the spinoff Like a Dragon: Ishin! and the prequel installment Yakuza 0 in 2014 and 2015 respectively. A direct sequel titled Yakuza 6: The Song of Life was released in 2016.

== Gameplay ==
The gameplay is relatively similar to previous games in the series, with a few changes. Similar to past games, gameplay is divided into two components: Adventure Mode and Combat Mode. Adventure Mode allows players to explore different areas and participate in side activities including mini-games and retro games such as Virtua Fighter 2 and Taiko No Tatsujin. The cities are also significantly bigger than previous games, providing more areas to explore in the game and is said to feature the greatest volume of play spots across cities in the series' history. The change between the game's Adventure Mode and Combat Mode is also said to be more seamless than previous games, which involved a transitional change when encountering enemies whilst in adventure mode. Controls for the game have also been said to have been improved "dramatically" as with the tempo of the game's combat mode.

== Plot ==
=== Setting and characters ===
The game features five main protagonists, the highest number of main protagonists of any game in the series, with the previous highest being Yakuza 4's four main protagonists. The game features series protagonist, Kazuma Kiryu (Takaya Kuroda), the main character since the original Yakuza game. There are also two returning protagonists from Yakuza 4, namely Shun Akiyama (Koichi Yamadera) and Taiga Saejima (Rikiya Koyama). One of the new main protagonists is Haruka Sawamura (Rie Kugimiya), a recurring character of the series since the original game. Though she has always been an integral part of the story, she has never been a playable main character before the game. She is also the only playable character whose gameplay is exclusively focused on rhythm. Nonetheless, her gameplay incorporates mechanics similar to her combat-based counterparts, including a Heat gauge. Lastly is Tatsuo Shinada (Toshiyuki Morikawa), a new character to the Like a Dragon series.

For the first time in the series, the game features five distinct locales across Japan. First of which, returning from previous games, is Kamurocho, a fictionalized yet realistic recreation of Shinjuku's red-light district, Kabukichō. Second is Sōtenbori, a fictional Osaka district based on Dōtonbori, returning from Yakuza 2. The three new cities in the game are: Nagasugai, the fictional red light district of Fukuoka, based on Nakasu; Tsukimino, part of the fictional Sapporo, based on Susukino; and Kin'eicho, part of the fictional Nagoya, based on Sakae. According to general director Toshihiro Nagoshi and producer/writer Masayoshi Yokoyama, it would be like the "San Andreas" of the Like a Dragon series, as a "massive expansion on the core concept that takes the franchise to new heights."

=== Story ===
In December 2012, the 7th chairman of the Omi Alliance, Tsubasa Kurosawa, is terminally ill. With his impending death, the truce between the Tojo Clan and Omi Alliance deteriorates. Daigo Dojima (Satoshi Tokushige) leads delegations to negotiate with Yamagasa Family patriarch Tadashi Madarame (Kenji Utsumi). Daigo then meets Kazuma Kiryu, who is working as a taxi driver under the alias Taichi Suzuki.

After work, Kiryu meets Daigo's bodyguards, Yu Morinaga (Hiroki Tōchi) and Masato Aizawa (Hiroki Yasumoto), who inform him that Daigo is missing. Minoru Aoyama (Kenyu Horiuchi) becomes interim chairman in his absence. Kiryu meets detective Kazuhiko Serizawa (Eiji Okuda), who points out Omi Alliance Captain Masaru Watase (Rintarō Nishi) as a suspect. Watase is unaware of Daigo's whereabouts, but claims that Aoyama has been secretly giving him information. At a hotel where Madarame and Aoyama are meeting, Kiryu finds Madarame stabbed by Aoyama, who plans to take over the Tojo Clan. Afterwards, Kiryu learns from Madarame that Daigo had gone into hiding in fear of Aoyama, who looks to start a conflict with the Yamagasa. Preventing bloodshed, Kiryu defeats Aoyama's army by himself. Before Aoyama can reveal his boss's identity, Morinaga kills him, and directs Kiryu to Kamurocho. While making preparations for his return, Serizawa reveals that Goro Majima (Hidenari Ugaki) has died.

Taiga Saejima is serving his sentence at Abashiri Prison, where he learns of Majima's death. The deputy warden helps Saejima and his cellmate Shigeki Baba (Shunsuke Daito) escape. The two kidnap Taizo Kitakata (Kōzō Shioya), Majima's supposed killer, who reveals that Majima faked his death. Baba shoots Kitakata to silence him, but he survives. Baba also reveals to Saejima that he deliberately planned to have him and Saejima escape prison so that he could be lured. Saejima subdues him but decides to spare Baba. He is then directed by Serizawa to Kamurocho.

Haruka Sawamura trains to be the top J-pop idol to earn money for her family. She had been scouted by Mirei Park (Romi Park), who forced Kiryu to hide his identity and leave the orphanage to protect Haruka's reputation. Haruka and Park bond, and Park confesses she received a letter from her ex-husband, who she plans to meet. The following day, she is found dead, of apparent suicide. Her death alerts Shun Akiyama, who reunites with Haruka. They conclude Park's suicide note was forged, at the behest of Naoyuki Katsuya (Mitsuru Fukikoshi), CEO of Osaka Enterprises, a subsidiary of the Omi Alliance. Akiyama finds Haruka's trainer, Kan Ogita (Ryōta Takeuchi), who confesses to killing Park accidentally after he tried to obtain a letter from Goro Majima from her, to find his whereabouts. Ogita is killed by Kamon Kanai (Hideo Ishikawa), the Captain of Osaka Enterprises. It is revealed that Park's ex-husband was Majima. With Haruka's competitions completed and her protected from Kanai by Akiyama, she and Akiyama head to Tokyo, with Katsuya following.

Former pro-baseball player Tatsuo Shinada is hired by a disguised Daigo to investigate a match-fixing scandal that led to his wrongful banishment from professional baseball in 1997. Shinada investigates the scandal with Koichi Takasugi (Show Aikawa), his loan shark, and finds that his former manager, Fujita (Junpei Morita), is responsible for framing him, which led to the police investigation and subsequent expulsion of the local Tojo and Omi families. Daigo reveals his true identity, and the two return to Tokyo.

As Kiryu arrives in Tokyo, he learns that Baba is an accomplice in the Omi Alliance's plan, who planned to draw out Saejima and Kiryu. Serizawa tasks Saejima with finding Morinaga, but he is revealed to be dead. Akiyama and Shinada meet, and learn that Haruka may be targeted during the Princess League. Investigation into Katsuya reveals that he was Park's friend, and did not order her death.

Baba, Kiryu, Saejima and Aizawa see a broadcast claiming Haruka's concert has been canceled. Thinking Katsuya guilty, Kiryu and Saejima confront him. They, along with Watase, reach Katsuya, who intends to lure out the actual mastermind, Serizawa who is revealed to be Chairman Kurosawa. Daigo intervenes, but is shot and knocked unconscious by Kanai, who is also affiliated with Kurosawa. Kiryu refuses to cancel Haruka's concert, and the four decide to protect her. Majima is revealed to have only faked his death so that he could secretly investigate Kurosawa.

Before the plan can start, Kurosawa's men, impersonating the Majima Family, arrive at the Millennium Tower guns blazing to destroy Majima's reputation. With Haruka's concert underway, Akiyama and Kiryu fend off Kurosawa's men while Shinada fights Baba. At the top of the Millennium Tower, Saejima and Majima fight to a stalemate. Kurosawa loses his leverage when Baba refuses to shoot Haruka. Kurosawa attempts to kill Majima and Saejima, but is stopped by Daigo and Katsuya. In the streets, Akiyama defeats Kanai before being relieved by Watase, Madarame, and Kitakata.

At the Tojo Clan Headquarters, Kiryu learns that Aizawa is Kurosawa's son. Kurosawa wanted to leave the Tojo Clan and Omi Alliance to Aizawa, but Aizawa desired to gain power independently. A wounded Kiryu defeats Aizawa. Regretting her sacrifices to become an idol, Haruka publicly confesses her background and retires. She reunites with Kiryu not long afterwards, who proceeds to collapse from his injuries.

== Development ==
The game had double the development time of previous games in the series, which generally had a one-year development cycle. The game was developed as something akin to being a reboot of the series, and dubbed as a "New Yakuza" by developers with the goal of having one of the greatest scripts and scenarios in the series' history. In addition, the game was developed on an all new game engine. The game was seen as a fresh start for developers, who treated Yakuza: Dead Souls as the end for everything developed for the series up to that point. On December 5, 2014, Sega announced Yakuza 5 would be released worldwide on December 8, 2015, as a digital download via the PlayStation Network.

A remaster with improved resolution and frame rate was released for the PlayStation 4 on June 20, 2019, in Japan. The remaster was released in English on February 11, 2020, as part of The Yakuza Remastered Collection, alongside remasters of Yakuza 3 and Yakuza 4, with a re-translated English script, restored content from the Japanese version, and a togglable option between Japanese kanji and romaji lyrics and English translated lyrics for the karaoke tracks.

== Reception ==
Reception

Aggregate scores
Aggregator	Score
Metacritic	PS3: 83/100; PS4: 82/100
OpenCritic	92% recommend(Remaster) (Note: Based on 12 reviews)

Review scores
Publication	Score
Destructoid	8.5/10
Famitsu	40/40
GameRevolution	4.5/5
GameSpot	8/10
GamesRadar+	4/5
Hardcore Gamer	4.5/5
HobbyConsolas	93%
IGN	8.4/10 (Italy)

Yakuza 5 received generally positive reviews release in western territories, while receiving critical acclaim in Japan. It holds a score of 83 out of 100 on review aggregator website Metacritic. The game received a perfect score of 40 out of 40 from Japanese gaming magazine Famitsu. Hobby Consolas called it "one of the best games in the history of PS3" and "an incomparable piece of art that has everything: five main characters, five cities, an attractive script, lots of missions, a great combat system." Hardcore Gamer called it "one of the best games of last generation."

IGN Italy said it is "steeped in Japanese culture to the core and exciting in its multiple storylines." GameSpot praised the "Engrossing storylines", "large variety of rich minigames", locales "alive with activity and diversions galore", "welcome surprise" pop idol chapter, and "Hard-hitting combat", but said the "Combat mechanics show their age". The Game Scouts said it looks "better than most recent next-gen releases" with "some of the best facial models" and "authentic" environments, stated the "writing is absolutely masterful, walking a fine line between satirical humor and serious gangster drama", and called it "a masterpiece", "one of the greatest games" on the PS3, and "right next to The Witcher 3" as a Game of the Year candidate. GameSpot also liked the handling of her story due to how the character of Haruka has matured ever since her debut although the reviews had mixed opinions about her career. HobbyConsolas stated while idols might not be interesting to Western gamers, Haruka still offered more variety to the game.

=== Sales ===
The game sold 590,000 copies in Japan by April 2013. In Japan, approximately 21,047 physical units for PlayStation 4 were sold during its PS4 release launch week becoming the second best selling game of any format.
