= Takayuki Yagami =

Fictional character in the 2018 video game Judgment

- Judgment character
- Takayuki Yagami as seen in Lost Judgment (2021)
- First game: Judgment (2018)
- Created by: Toshihiro Nagoshi
- Voiced by: Japanese; Takuya Kimura; English; Greg Chun

Takayuki Yagami (Japanese: 八神 隆之, Hepburn: Yagami Takayuki), "Tak" (ター坊, Tābō) for short, is a character in Sega's 2018 action-adventure video game Judgment, which is a spin-off from the Yakuza game series. Yagami is a former defense attorney who resigns after a client he successfully defended kills their partner. Three years later, Yagami is a private detective in his own "Yagami Detective Agency" (八神探偵事務所, Yagami Tantei Jimusho) and investigates a serial killer who gouges out their victims' eyes. The character returns in Lost Judgment as he investigates a criminal accused of both sexual harassment and murder. Yagami is voiced by Takuya Kimura in Japanese and by Greg Chun in English. Yagami's physical appearance is also based on Kimura.

When developing Yagami, the Ryu Ga Gotoku Studio team wanted to create a new type of main character following the release of Yakuza 6: The Song of Life, which concludes the story of series protagonist Kazuma Kiryu. Contrasting Kiryu's strong, heroic presence, Yagami is meant to be a more relatable character due to his troubled life. To differentiate between the two protagonists, Yagami was given sidequests in which he becomes friends with residents of Kamurocho. Takuya Kimura was chosen to voice Yagami to appeal to a wide audience. Greg Chun, who played Yagami in English-language versions of the game, said the role was challenging but enjoyable.

Critical response to Yagami has been generally positive. Video game journalists have praised the depth of Yagami's character arc and backstory in Judgment, and have favorably compared him to former protagonist Kiryu. Kimura and Chun have both been commended for their portrayals of the character.

== Creation and development ==
=== Personality and influences ===
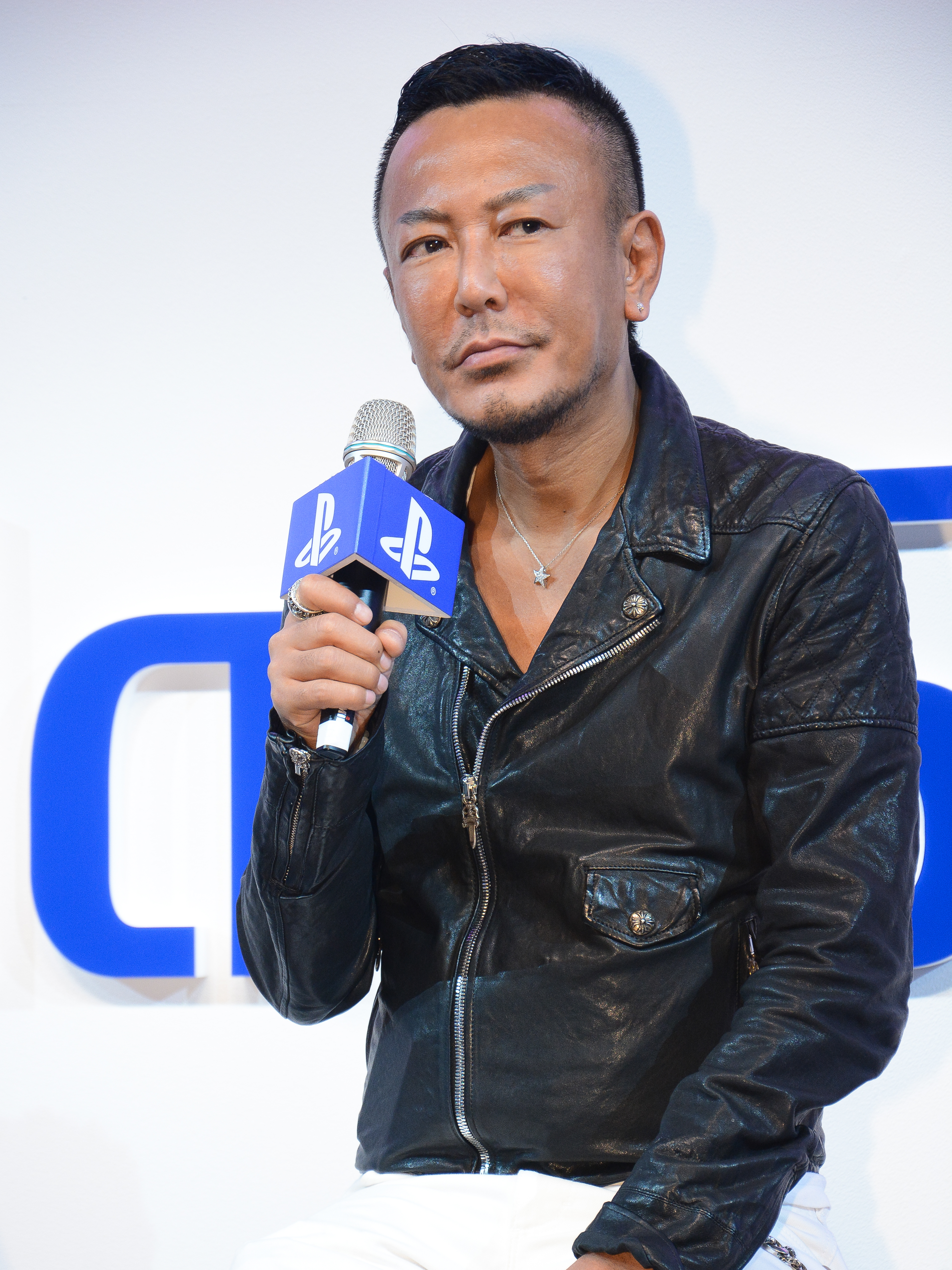
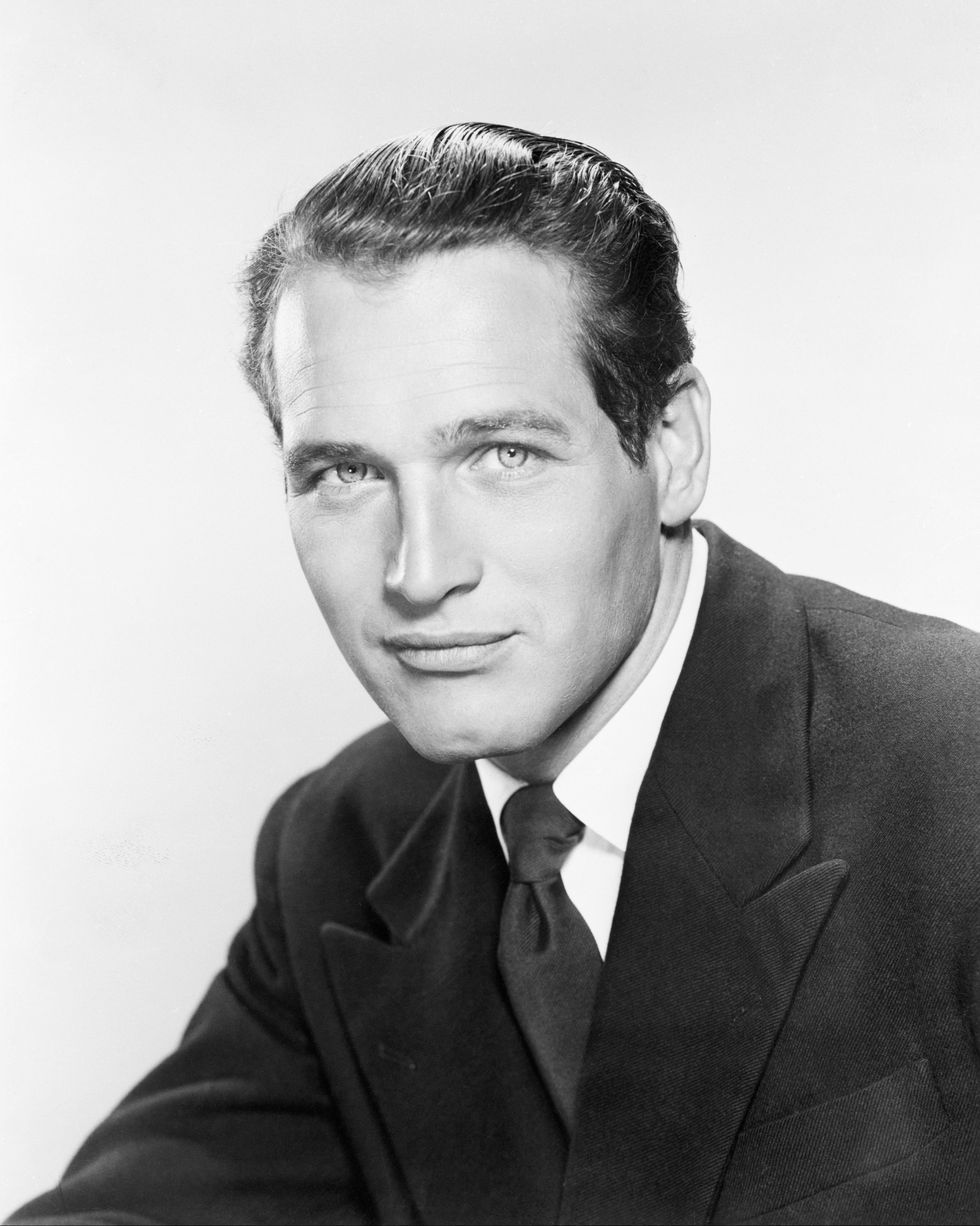
Writer and executive director Toshihiro Nagoshi used multiple detective stories as inspiration for Yagami's character, most notably Paul Newman in The Verdict.

Since the game Yakuza 6: The Song of Life concluded the story of Yakuza series protagonist Kazuma Kiryu, the Ryu Ga Gotoku Studio game developers wanted to create a distinctive character for the story. At the behest of producer Kazuki Hosokawa, the team decided the character should be a detective. The biggest influence was the Paul Newman film The Verdict, in which Newman's character Frank Galvin suffers a crisis similar to Yagami's in regards to his career as a lawyer. In order to establish a stark contrast between Kiryu and the new protagonist, the staff wanted to develop Yagami as a more flawed character, with his fall from grace and gradual redemption arc being designed to appeal to players who wanted a more distinct and relatable protagonist. Due to the popularity of detective stories, Ryu Ga Gotoku Studio wrote Yagami as a man who would become more knowledgeable alongside the player as the game progressed.

Sega described Yagami as "a man of conviction who fights for his beliefs, despite the overwhelming despair surrounding him".

Executive director and writer Toshihiro Nagoshi said the detective idea drew on multiple influences, primarily Korean films. Because there are few games based on detective dramas, Hosokawa wanted Yagami to stand out but recognized creating a new character is a major challenge. To make a protagonist who would be a fitting successor to Kiryu, Hosokawa wanted Yagami to be "more grounded to fit the noir vibe". He also said:

"When you're writing a story and there's a really solid character that's been around for a long time, the character dictates what happens next. In contrast to that, with Yagami, at the start of development we didn't really have anything attached to him at all. It was a challenge, but also an opportunity for a development team that has been working so long on the same series."

The staff wanted the protagonist to have a deep connection to the city. To emphasize this, they introduced a gameplay mechanic known as the Friendship System, allowing Yagami to befriend and form bonds with the residents of Kamurocho. The developers used the main story to explore facets of Yagami's personality, using sidequests to please fans wanting a balance between seriousness and comedy. Hosokawa regarded the friendship system as one of his favorite parts of Judgment due to the bonds Yagami forms with other characters. As a result, Hosokawa believes that a Judgment sequel would have to remain in Kamurocho due to Yagami's strong connection with the city and its people. In contrast to previous Yakuza protagonists, who are often only visitors to Kamurocho, Yagami was written as a civilian resident in the city, allowing his social life to be further explored.

Localization producer Scott Strichart said though fans might miss previous Yakuza characters, like Kiryu and Goro Majima, he hoped they would be receptive to Yagami, describing him as "his own person – super smart, a razor-sharp wit, and a guy who harbours his own flaws, too". Strichart discussed that the portrayals of yakuza are faithful to the main series due to multiple characters being involved in the clans. However, Yagami was noted for standing out within the cast as he has multiple life choices in contrast to others who are forced to be yakuza or already have a path.

The relationship between Yagami and his ex-lover Mafuyu Fujii was changed during development because Nagoshi found the romance spoiled the thriller aspects of Judgment. Nagoshi also expressed doubts about the game's popularity in English-speaking countries because Takuya Kimura is not popular in Western regions. Following the release of the game, Sega staff felt that if there should be a sequel to Judgment, Yagami and his partner Masaharu Kaito would retain their lead roles and would still be set in Kamurocho.

In Lost Judgment, the narrative focuses primarily on bullying as they consider it as a "Distorted justice" which clashes with Yagami's morals. Strichart commented that Yagami is not a hero so he is not able to solve all these cases on his which contrast the fantasy style Persona 5 which often deals with the protagonists saving victims using their powers. During Lost Judgment Yagami meets handyman Jin Kuwana who instead tries to solve every attempt of bullying regardless of methods. In contrast to Judgment, the sequel does not end on satisfactory note for Yagami as Kuwana manages to escape from the protagonist. Nevertheless, Yagami demonstrates a major influence on the bullies he meets in the game's beginning to the point they become heroic figures during the climax. Due to the character's unspecified age in Lost Judgment, Sega hopes to feature him as the protagonist at least one time again in video game form. Hosokawa commented the player should sympathize with the lead, which made Yagami's characterization to be consistent with the first game with the idea that Yagami is a common person without supernatural powers.

=== Casting ===
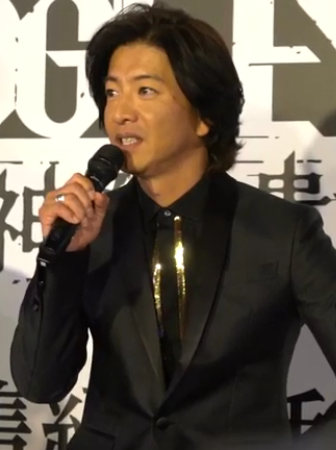
Takuya Kimura served as a face model to Yagami as well as Japanese actor.

Early in the development of Judgment, the developers considered using a famous actor to portray Yagami, deciding upon Takuya Kimura. Nagoshi was afraid audiences would accuse them of toning down the character due to Kimura's popularity. However, Kimura was open to the team's suggestions and worked with the developers to hone the character. Yagami has more spoken dialogue in Judgment than Kiryu had in any individual Yakuza game. Sega was pleased with Kimura's performance, noting he needed far fewer retakes during recording than they anticipated. Some lines were rewritten to better fit Kimura's delivery, but the writers ensured these changes would not deviate from Yagami's personality. The game's dialogue was recorded in chronological order so players would feel Kimura's voice evolving as Yagami's character develops during the story. Kimura enjoyed his work on the game, and Nagoshi remarked on Kimura's quick response to his messages. In contrast with previous Yakuza titles, the game was not recorded until after the whole scenario was written, which helped Kimura and the other actors. Yagami's character was revealed alongside the Japanese marketing of the game in September 2018. Sega stated that Kimura spent "more than 1,000 minutes of voice recording time for his lines". As a result, the company aimed to bring a major appeal in the protagonist. Kimura's influence in Judgment was compared to Keanu Reeves's in Cyberpunk 2077 as the Nagoshi believes the games would make extra sales as a result of their popularities. However, did not want Kimura's presence to be the only reason why Judgment would be popular.

Nagoshi also expressed doubts about the game's popularity in English-speaking countries because Kimura is not popular in Western regions. The game also references other parts of Kimura's career, such as the dialogue line "Chotto mateyo" (Hey, wait a minute!), a line spoken by Kimura's character in the 1997 television drama Love Generation and Yagami's use of multiple outfits like Kimura. Stritchart claimed that Kimura's inclusion as Yagami was kept in secret between staff members, shocking the localization staff when the first video of Yagami was revealed. Stritchart was initially confused, believing Yagami's similarities with Kimura might be accidental but the inclusion of his lines made him realize the actor's connections.

=== Localization ===
Based on his previous knowledge of the Yakuza franchise, Greg Chun was surprised and pleased to be selected to voice Yagami in the English-language version of Judgment. Yagami's voice was meant to make him sound like a "bona fide badass" regardless of language, something the localization team believed they succeeded at. The actor found his work on the game gratifying, saying, "it really did require me to let go of the tricks that you use to push a performance through, and I really did need to fall back on authenticity and genuine groundedness". He claimed that staying faithful to the "spirit of the Japanese version" was challenging, but enjoyed portraying Yagami's blend of seriousness and comedy. He said having to scream in certain parts of the game was difficult. Chun was surprised by the depth of Yagami's character arc, considering his work on the game an unforgettable experience. Nevertheless, Chun felt the character easy to connect with because of his realistic characterization.

For Lost Judgment, Chun noted that the predecessor helped to properly develop Yagami to the point he seemed like another person when quitting his lawyer occupation as he took a liking to being a humble detective; This was mostly seen through the scene where Yagami tells Kaito that they should search for a lady's cat as part of their job in pleased manner something the localization team enjoyed recording. As a result, he claims that for the sequel "the game kind of teed me up to really be in that Yagami mindset where, yeah, I love being a detective, but some cases are real bummer and super boring." However, in regards to the narrative, he claimed that he had to keep "living the character" due to new elements provided. He believes that Lost Judgment explores more Yagami's anger, something the first game did not focus on.

=== Gameplay ===
Although Yagami claims that his fighting style is self taught to the point of calling it "Kamurocho School" (神室町流, Kamurochō-ryū), the creators of the game were inspired by Chinese martial arts. Ryu Ga Gotoku Studio developed multiple techniques for Yagami. While the team had experience thanks to the main Yakuza game, they felt that Yagami should have own new investigative actions. This was provided by the fact that Judgment is a "legal suspense" game and thus were restricted to techniques that fit the genre. This was balanced by giving Yagami his own detective skills not present in any of their previous works. Nagoshi wanted to make Yagami's moves entertaining in order to make the player relief stress from the dark narrative but did not want him to use over-the-top fighting techniques. Yagami was given the Parkour moves like the wall kick with the intention of making the character being easy to control. Yagami's fighting style was inspired by Asian movies with a stylishness based on Kung Fu style and Parkour moves at the same time. In order to fit the actor behind the character, Nagoshi claimed that he drew parallels from Power Rangers-like characters. This further made Nagoshi felt Yagami's character would be fitting to Kimura.

In the original Japanese version of the game, Yagami's fighting styles are known as Flash (一閃, Issen) and Waltz (円舞, Enbu) stances. Sega changed them for the Western release to crane-style and tiger-style stances since they found order to these two words more common for English speakers. As downloadable content, Yagami can perform Qi techcniques. For Lost Judgment a new fighting style known as Snake was added; it was based on Aikido with Nagoshi commenting it served as a merciful style. Lost Judgment also features a fourth fighting style, Fists of Might, based on boxing, as part of an optional paid downloadable content pack.

== Appearances ==
=== Judgment ===
Born in 1983, Takayuki Yagami is orphaned as a teenager after his attorney father proves an accused murderer innocent, leading the victim's father to kill his parents in retribution. Yagami moves to Kamurocho, where he is taken in and raised by yakuza patriarch Mitsugu Matsugane. Matsugane's friend Ryuzo Genda takes an interest in Yagami, paying his law school tuition and later hiring him to work at his law firm. Yagami gains widespread recognition in 2015 after proving Advanced Drug Development Center (ADDC) janitor Shinpei Okubo innocent of murdering patient Koichi Waku. Shortly thereafter, Okubo is arrested for killing his girlfriend Emi Terasawa and burning down his apartment. As a result, Yagami gives up practicing law.

Three years later, at the beginning of Judgment, Yagami has become a private detective, working alongside former Matsugane family yakuza Masaharu Kaito. While helping prove Matsugane captain Kyohei Hamura innocent of murder, Yagami becomes interested in a serial murder case in which the victims' eyes are removed from the bodies. Dubbing the killer "The Mole", Yagami and Kaito begin investigating the case with help from several others.

After the Mole kills Yagami's former colleague Masamichi Shintani, Yagami discovers ties between the Mole and ADDC doctor Yoji Shono. Yagami meets Shigeru Kajihira, who reveals a failed plan to take over the area around the ADDC for a land redevelopment program that was foiled when researchers claimed to have found a potential cure for Alzheimer's disease named "AD-9". Kajihira asks Yagami to investigate the death of former ADDC vice-director Toru Hashiki. While police detective Mitsuru Kuroiwa accuses fellow detective Kazuya Ayabe of being the Mole, Yagami theorizes the real culprit is conducting human experiments to test the effectiveness of AD-9 and that the deaths of Waku, Shintani and Hashiki were failed experiments. He also suspects Shono killed Terasawa to cover up the experiments.

After Matsugane is killed defending them both from the Mole, Hamura tells Yagami that Kuroiwa is the Mole and provides Yagami with evidence of the ADDC's connection to Shintani's murder. Yagami successfully defends Ayabe in court and proves the ADDC's involvement in the murders. During the trial, Yagami learns Kuroiwa has escaped and pursues him to the ADDC. Yagami defeats Kuroiwa, who is shot by the police, while Shono dies of side effects from an AD-9 injection. The court frees Okubo and places the others involved in the conspiracy under arrest. In the aftermath, Yagami declines to take up law again and continues to work with Kaito at the Yagami Detective Agency.

=== Lost Judgment ===
Yagami returns in the 2021 game Lost Judgment. Producer Kazuki Hosokawa claimed that a new side of Yagami's personality would be explored when interacting with high school students. Yagami and Kaito help two detectives from Yokohama in Yokohama's Seiryo High School. He is then called by Shirosaki at the Genda Law Office whose client, Akihiro Ehara, was arrested and convicted for sexual battery, but during his court testimony he revealed he knew about the death of Hiro Mikoshiba, who he holds responsible for his son's suicide. As Yagami investigates, he discovers that Ehara's case is connected to an attempted suicide in 2008 which led to the victim, Mitsuru Kusumoto, being trapped in a coma. Yagami learns from Seiryo teacher Yoko Sawa that Mikoshiba was in fact bullying Toshiro, but she was coerced by the school to stay silent. During this investigation, Yagami meets handyman Jin Kuwana who acts as an ally and is related with the deaths of bullies. However, despite these successes, Yagami is unable to save Sawa from being murdered by the RK, a Hangure gang led by Kazuki Soma, who are hunting Kuwana.

Sawa's death angers Yagami as he is unable to find evidence to capture Soma. Yagami discovers that the police have pinned Sawa's death on Kuwana. Further investigation leads to Yagami discovering that the National Police Agency's Public Security Division, led by Hidemi Bando, has secretly hired RK to capture Kuwana, as they have learned that Mitsuru's mother, Vice Health Minister Reiko Kusumoto, murdered one of Mitsuru's bullies, Shinya Kawai, with Kuwana's assistance. Yagami wants Kuwana to offer himself to the police but they clash as the latter share's Kuwana assistance. After Kuwana fakes his death in a ship, Yagami joins Shirosaki at having Ehara confess his true crime to the law, using a recording of the students that reveals that Mikoshiba was responsible for Toshiro's suicide.

Following this case, Yagami and his friends face the RK in order to save them from Kuwana. Yagami manages to capture Soma after several battles. Kuwana still refuses to turn himself even after being defeated by Yagami but as there is no proof that of his crimes, he escapes. Before his departure, Yagami tells Kuwana that he while the law might not be perfect, he will fight for its sake and arrest him the next time they meet.

== Reception ==
=== Critical response ===
Critical response to Takayuki Yagami has been generally positive. GamesRadar+ considered Yagami's character one of the biggest differences between Judgment and the Yakuza games, highlighting Yagami's different worldview; the reviewer praised Yagami because he stands out both physically and mentally. RPGamer and IGN called Yagami a likable hero and considered his character arc the best part of the game, In regards to the way Judgment was translated by Sega, Matteo Fabbretti from Translation Matters noted that the localization of the game makes a major contrast between Yagami's and Kaito's dialogues. In the English version, Yagami retains the Japanese honorifics the Yakuza series is known for while Kaito instead comes with an idea of scepticism. GamingBolt and HardcoreGamer in particular praised Yagami's fighting styles, considering one of the best executed in gaming as well as Heat sequences.

Yagami's role in Lost Judgment was praised by Destructoid for giving new parts of his personality that are developed in the narrative. In particular Inverse enjoyed the dynamics between Yagami and supporting character Kyoko Amasawa when interacting in the school. RPGFan found Yagami's time dealing with high school students in Lost Judgment as one of the best side stories in ever developed by Sega due to the multiple tactics employed by the protagonist to work out with teenagers which serves as a major contrast to the dark main narrative of the game. Screenrant acclaimed Lost Judgment Yagami as "The Perfect RGG Hero", finding him superior to Kasuga and Kiryu for his heroic deeds, social life and lack of relationship with corrupted people as his only yakuza friends left it in favor of other jobs. Yagami was also praised for his sympethetic personality which allows him to easily make more friends during his job. CBR regarded Yagami's interaction with the Profession Arc as one of the best ones from the game as it delves on the message. of community and forgiveness.

Journalists also commented on the vocal performances of Yagami's two voice actors. RPGamer gave Judgment its Editors' Choice Award for Best Voice Acting, praising both Kimura and Chun's performances as Yagami. VG247, Kotaku USGamer noted Kimura's appeal to female Japanese fans based on his portrayal of the character. Chun's performance as Yagami was praised by The Hollywood Reporter and Game Informer, with EGM Now finding his performance more striking than Kimura's. In the 2020 NAVGTR Awards, Kimura was nominated for the "Performance in a Drama, Lead" award for his work as Yagami, but lost to Charlotte McBurney's Amicia from A Plague Tale: Innocence. Due to Kimura's popularity within Judgment, Japanese fans have often nicknamed the game Kimutaku ga Gotoku (キムタクが如く; lit. "Like KimuTaku") with "Kimutaku" being a short of Takuya Kimura while "Gotoku" ("Like a" in Japanese) as a reference to the original Japanese title of the Yakuza franchise: Ryu Ga Gotoku ("Like a Dragon"). For Lost Judgment both actors received equal positive response especially when Yagami is involved in a dark scene. In the 2022 "Famitsu Dengeki Game Awards", Lost Judgment' won "Best Actor Award" for Kimura's performance as Yagami.

=== Analysis ===
In the book Globalization and Sense-Making Practices, Yagami was compared with Kasuga due to how both possess a complex sense of morality despite the differences in style between the two Judgment games and the Like a Dragon games that were released after Yakuza 6 while drawing parallels about the handling of bullying heavily explore in Persona 5 which Yagami also tries to solve in Lost Judgment. Jacqueline Roshman from Dalarna University noted that the translation in Lost Judgment also tries being faithful to the original Japanese version with Yagami often being called "Yagami-shi" with the honorifics referring to his status as a detective while others kept focused on to properly change Yagami's impoliteness while interacting with Kuwana or when talking in a friendly manner with Kaito.

In Faces of justice in the video game Lost Judgment, Intan Annisya Puspa Jelita and Isti Siti Saleha Gandana claimed that Yagami expressed "distributive justice" in contrast to the antagonist Jin Kuwana's "retributive" side. Both characters have ties with the law that gave them negative ideas and have developed ideas that are relevant in Japan. Yagami's sense of justice is notable when he often shows the need of helping others in important situations and claims it is not fair to take justice in one's hand just like Kuwana tries. Yagami's ideas of justices can be linked to Morton Deutsch's and Peter T. Coleman's philosophy. In conclusion, the writers claim that Yagami and Kuwana were created to show different views on justice.

=== Controversy ===
In July 2021, Sega expressed concern over the usage of Kimura's appearance for Yagami. Kimura's talent agency, Johnny & Associates disapproved the idea of Judgment and Lost Judgment being ported to the PC, fearing improper usage of their actor. As a result, writers expressed fear over the future of Judgment series to the point Lost Judgment might be the final game in the series due to Johnny & Associates disliking the apparent changes to the PC and Sega failing to get approval to make Steam ports in the process. In response, TheGamer said that a sequel to Judgment is still possible with another character that might replace Yagami and continue the narrative like Sugiura or Kaito.

Despite the controversy, both Judgment and Lost Judgment were released on Steam on September 14, 2022, following a surprise announcement from RGG Studio on the same day.
