= Yakuza Kiwami =

2016 video game

- Developer: Ryu Ga Gotoku Studio (Note: Ported to Windows by Lab42)
- Publishers: WW: Sega; PAL: Deep Silver (PS4)
- Director: Koji Yoshida
- Producers: Masayoshi Yokoyama; Mitsuhiro Shimano
- Designer: Kazuki Hosokawa
- Programmers: Koji Tokieda; Yutaka Ito
- Artist: Nobuaki Mitake
- Writer: Masayoshi Yokoyama
- Composer: Hidenori Shoji
- Series: Yakuza
- Platforms: PlayStation 3; PlayStation 4; Windows; Xbox One; Nintendo Switch; Nintendo Switch 2; PlayStation 5; Xbox Series X/S
- Release: PlayStation 3: JP: January 21, 2016; PlayStation 4: JP: January 21, 2016; WW: August 29, 2017; Windows: WW: February 19, 2019; Xbox One: WW: April 21, 2020; Amazon Luna: US: December 22, 2022; Nintendo Switch: WW: October 24, 2024; Nintendo Switch 2: WW: November 13, 2025; PlayStation 5, Xbox Series X/S: WW: December 8, 2025
- Genres: Action-adventure, beat 'em up
- Mode: Single-player

Yakuza Kiwami (Note: Japanese: 龍龍が如く 極, Hepburn: Ryū ga Gotoku Kiwami; lit. "Like a Dragon Extreme") is a 2016 action-adventure game developed by Ryu Ga Gotoku Studio and published by Sega. It is a remake of Yakuza, the first game in the Yakuza series, originally released on the PlayStation 2. Yakuza Kiwami was released on PlayStation 3 and PlayStation 4 in Japan on January 21, 2016, and on PlayStation 4 in Europe and North America on August 29, 2017. It was also ported to Windows via Steam worldwide on February 19, 2019, to Xbox One on April 21, 2020, to Amazon Luna on December 22, 2022, to Nintendo Switch on October 24, 2024, and to Nintendo Switch 2 on November 13, 2025. Versions for PlayStation 5 and Xbox Series X/S were released on December 8, 2025.

Like the original PlayStation 2 game, Yakuza Kiwami explores the life of Kazuma Kiryu who is demoted from his clan after taking the blame for his boss's murder. After a decade in prison, Kiryu searches for his old friends who have gone missing. The remake adds extra elements to the story, including Akira Nishikiyama's corruption during Kiryu's imprisonment and constant struggles between Kiryu and his rival Goro Majima. The gameplay was adjusted to resemble the prequel Yakuza 0, with the aim of adding more depth to the fighting system.

Sega had ideas to remake the first Yakuza game in 2015 as part of the series' 10th anniversary but were unsure about developing due to their team focused on making Yakuza 0. Following the success of Yakuza 0, Sega started working on the remake of the first game and aimed to add new elements to the story while trying to make it more enjoyable than the original game. The game was well received, earning positive sales. Critics praised the simplicity of the combat but were divided by the handling of the storyline and side missions. Nonetheless, the Majima Everywhere system was praised for its comedic value. Yakuza Kiwami was followed up by Yakuza 6: The Song of Life later in 2016, and another remake based on the second game titled Yakuza Kiwami 2 was also released in 2017.

== Gameplay ==
Like the original game, Yakuza Kiwami is an action-adventure game with role-playing elements set in an open world environment and played from a third-person perspective. The player controls protagonist Kazuma Kiryu as he explores the streets of Kamurocho, a fictional district of Tokyo based on the real-life Kabukichō district. In addition to the main story, players will randomly encounter enemies on the street to battle, as well as meet people that will offer Kiryu side quests which can be completed for rewards.

Yakuza Kiwami entirely forgoes the combat system of the original game; its combat is largely similar to the prequel Yakuza 0. Just like 0, Kiwami features four fighting styles that the player can switch between in combat: the balanced Brawler style, the slow and heavy Beast style, the weak but quick Rush style, and Kiryu's traditional Dragon style. Players will earn both money and experience points by defeating enemies or completing side quests. Experience points can be used to acquire upgrades for Kiryu such as new techniques or an extension to his health bar. Money can be spent to purchase equipment or healing items, or to play various minigames and side-activities such as gambling, karaoke, and the card battle game Mesuking. Completing certain objectives will also grant the player special Completion Point currency; this CP can be spent to receive additional bonuses, such as special items or character upgrades.

Kiwami introduces a new gameplay system called "Majima Everywhere", which replaces the Mr. Shakedown system previously present in Yakuza 0, in which rival character Goro Majima will appear frequently to challenge Kiryu to a fight. Majima will appear randomly during exploration, as well as in predetermined challenges based on the player's progress in Majima Everywhere. Majima will also sometimes appear when playing a minigame (like darts or bowling) and will challenge Kiryu. Defeating Majima in different scenarios will increase the player's Majima Everywhere rank and unlock new abilities in Kiryu's Dragon style.

== Plot ==
Similar to the plot of the original Yakuza, the game centers around yakuza lieutenant Kazuma Kiryu (Takaya Kuroda), who takes the blame up for the murder of his patriarch Sohei Dojima, committed by his sworn brother and best friend Akira Nishikiyama (Kazuhiro Nakaya), spending ten years in prison before being granted parole. A free man, Kiryu discovers that Nishikiyama is now a powerful but cold-hearted yakuza boss, his childhood friend and girlfriend Yumi Sawamura (Maaya Sakamoto) has gone missing, and everyone is searching for ten billion yen that was stolen from his former organization, the Tojo Clan. As war erupts throughout the streets of Kamurocho between many different factions (including government agents and the Triad), Kiryu decides to find Yumi and the missing money, and protect Haruka (Rie Kugimiya), a mysterious young girl whom everyone seems to be after. Eventually, a remorseful Nishikiyama sacrifices himself to kill Haruka's father, Kyohei Jingu (Hiroaki Yoshida), who was a corrupt politician bent on destroying the Tojo and his loved ones, while Yumi died in Kiryu's arms from a gunshot wound. Rather than give in to despair and allow himself to be arrested, Kiryu leaves the Tojo and becomes Haruka's adoptive father.

Kiwami's story introduces flashback sequences in between each chapter, focused on Nishikiyama's descent into madness. The day after Dojima's murder and Kiryu's arrest, the Dojima Family tries to figure out the real culprit while mocking Nishikiyama for his ineptitude. In 1996, the Kazama Family patriarch, Shintaro Kazama (Tetsuya Watari), decides to give Nishikiyama his own "family" to control, with the expectation that he would look out for Kiryu when the latter is released from prison. However, Nishikiyama proves to be an incompetent leader, with his family captain, Matsushige (Hitoshi Ikeda), disrespecting him and commanding more respect among his men. As Yuko, his terminally ill sister, requires a heart transplant, Nishikiyama visits a doctor, who asks him to pay 30 million yen for the operation. Nishikiyama tells Matsushige to get the money by any means, prompting him to shake down stores in the Kazama Family territory. Osamu Kashiwagi (Shunsuke Sakuya), the Kazama Family captain, violently disciplines Nishikiyama, then forgives him but tells him that Kiryu would be morally better as a leader. Nishikiyama later encounters the Shimano Family patriarch, Futoshi Shimano (Naomi Kusumi), who accuses Kazama of deliberately giving Nishikiyama men he cannot control, and advises that Nishikiyama should learn to care for himself instead of Kiryu. Eventually, Nishikiyama learns from Matsushige that the doctor was a fraud who had use the money to pay off his gambling debt. Nishikiyama rushes to confront the doctor, but discovers that he has run away, and Yuko had died from her condition. Nishikiyama prepares to commit seppuku, but is interrupted by Matsushige. Finally fed up with the disrespect and harassment, Nishikiyama stabs Matsushige and confesses to Dojima's murder before using the blood to slick back his hair.

== Development ==
A comparison between the graphics of the original Yakuza (left) and Kiwami

Series writer Masayoshi Yokoyama stated that Sega had plans to develop Kiwami in 2015, with the company wishing gamers to enjoy the first Yakuza game in a more modern quality. However, they were busy during that time making the game Yakuza 0. Positive feedback to the prequel led to the making of Kiwami. The franchise's 10th anniversary and the engine used for Yakuza 0 also provided help, according to Yokoyama. The gameplay was made to be as friendly as possible to newcomers, with them being options to save the game's progress whenever they wanted. There were ideas in regards to changing the cast and recordings of the original games, but the staff felt it would not be an appealing remake if there were so many changes.

Rather than make it look like a retro game retaining the elements from the original PlayStation 2 games, the gameplay was made similar to eighth generation titles, most notably Yakuza 0. Therefore, the team had to face the challenge of understanding the quality of the graphics and audio they could produce with a next-generation console in contrast to the original console, which left the team wondering if there were issues with different parts of the game, like the way the original Yakuza camera worked. The new voice actors include Tomokazu Sugita (who plays Shinji); however, his characterization was left to keep faithful to his bond with Kiryu despite their different ranks. The story was further expanded to increase the length while adding new minigames. The fighting system was borrowed from Yakuza 0 with a focus on grinding. Similar to that game, Yakuza Kiwami has strong depictions of violence, most notably in the Heat Action sequences the player can perform. Yokoyama stated they wanted to make them as intense as possible.

The plot was further explored to focus on the depths of characters who did not have many appearances in the original game. Due to Goro Majima's popularity, he was made to clash with Kiryu often during sidequests. Majima's characterization was influenced by previous games to keep him motivated with the idea of strength following the events of Yakuza 0 which further focused on him. Kiwami improves the resolution, framerate, textures and loading times compared to the original game, and additional content was added to resolve some of the more confusing plot points, as well as tie the story more closely to the events of the prequel title Yakuza 0.

A steelbook edition of the game was released as part of the Western launch. A version for Windows was released on February 19, 2019. The game was released for Xbox One on April 21, 2020, for Amazon Luna on December 22, 2022, and for Nintendo Switch on October 24, 2024.

On 24 September 2025, SEGA and Ryu Ga Gotoku Studio announced an enhanced port of Yakuza Kiwami for Nintendo Switch 2, PlayStation 5, Xbox Series X/S, and PC via Steam, with the latter platform as an update (which also adds Traditional Chinese and Korean, which were originally available on the Microsoft Store release). The new version adds expanded language support (plus a new language to the series), including French, German, Italian, Spanish, Latin American Spanish, Brazilian Portuguese, Russian, and Simplified Chinese, as well as pre-rendered cutscenes now running at 60fps. It was released on November 13, 2025, for Nintendo Switch 2 and on December 8, 2025, for PlayStation 5, Xbox Series X/S, and PC.

== Reception ==
Reception

Aggregate scores
Aggregator	Score
Metacritic	PS4: 80/100; PC: 80/100; XONE: 81/100
OpenCritic	80% recommend (Note: Based on 145 reviews)

Review scores
Publication	Score
Destructoid	8/10
Famitsu	34/40
Game Informer	8.5/10
GameRevolution	8/10
GameSpot	8/10
GameStar	83/100
Hardcore Gamer	4.5/5
HobbyConsolas	89/100
IGN	7.9/10
Jeuxvideo.com	18/20
Polygon	7/10
RPGFan	83/100

Yakuza Kiwami holds an average of 80 out of 100 on Metacritic indicating "generally favorable reviews". It is recommended by 80% of critic reviews on review aggregator, OpenCritic, with a top critic average of 81 out of 100. Critics praised the improvements in regards to the fighting system due to the moves Kiryu can perform, with IGN and GameSpot comparing them positively to the previous Yakuza title, Yakuza 0. Game Informer referred to it as "simple and satisfying", commenting positively on the way Kiryu can easily perform intense fighting techniques. Polygon criticized how Dragon style has to be grinded as the multiple fights against Majima might make the player lose most of their health points. On the other hand, Eurogamer praised the interactions with Majima not only for the grinding but also because of the comic appeal the character brings. While not finding the remake as appealing as other titles, Destructoid found the game overall enjoyable, however, they criticized the boss fights because of their health regenerating during combat as well their style recycled from the fighting system of Yakuza 0. While overall praising the game, Game Informer criticized the side missions because of their repetitive formula. Nevertheless, the encounters with Majima were praised. GameSpot criticized how going around Kamurocho might feel underwhelming to the players comparing it to other open worlds found in gaming.

In regards to the presentation, the critical response has been mixed. The story was noted by Polygon as being more mature and brutal than in the prequel. Eurogamer praised the additions of the cutscenes involving Nishikiyama due to the new depths Sega brought in the way Kiryu is seen becoming his nemesis. GameSpot also praised the story, calling it "captivating" as generating a contrast between the dark aspects of the main story and the comical aspects of the side missions. Game Informer had mixed thoughts about the way the story was handled because of the "melodramatic" tone and the length of the cutscenes. Destructoid reported that the cutscenes were shorter and more entertaining than the ones from Yakuza 4, most notably whenever Kiryu interacts with Haruka. Another area praised by Destructoid was the comical spin given to the encounters of Majima. IGN was harsher, believing the game's pacing, storytelling, and length were its weakest points.

For the PC port of the game, Yakuza Kiwami retained the same Metacritic score. RPGFan praised the game storyline though it felt somewhat simple and linear. Both RPGFan and PC Invasion described Kiwami as an enjoyable starting point for newcomers to the series despite its issues. Vandal felt that the port was well executed and faithful to the original PlayStation 4 game, but lamented that its text was only in English.

The game was nominated for Game, Classic Revival at the National Academy of Video Game Trade Reviewers Awards.

=== Sales ===
The PlayStation 4 and PlayStation 3 versions were the top two best-selling games in Japan during their release week, selling 103,256 copies for PlayStation 4 and 60,427 for PlayStation 3. Sega's Chief creative officer Toshihiro Nagoshi stated that the western preorders for Yakuza Kiwami were generally good for the series. As of June 28, 2018, Yakuza 0 and Yakuza Kiwami were relaunched as PlayStation Hits. The Windows version of Kiwami was among the best-selling new releases of the month on Steam. (Note: Based on total revenue for the first two weeks on sale)

Masayoshi Yokoyama stated that the sales of the game on Switch exceeded far beyond their expectations.

== Sequel ==
Yakuza Kiwami 2, a remake of Yakuza 2 in the same style as Yakuza Kiwami, was originally released for PlayStation 4 on December 7, 2017, in Japan, and worldwide on August 28, 2018. The Windows version was released on May 9, 2019, and the Xbox One version was released on July 30, 2020.
