= Yakuza Kiwami 2 =

2017 video game

- Developer: Ryu Ga Gotoku Studio (Note: Ported to Windows by QLOC)
- Publisher: Sega
- Director: Hiroyuki Sakamoto
- Producers: Masayoshi Yokoyama; Daisuke Sato; Mitsuhiro Shimano
- Designer: Takeshi Tanaka
- Programmers: Koji Tokieda; Yutaka Ito
- Artist: Nobuaki Mitake
- Writer: Masayoshi Yokoyama
- Composers: Hidenori Shoji; Yuri Fukuda; Chihiro Aoki; Saori Yoshida
- Series: Yakuza
- Platforms: PlayStation 4; Windows; Xbox One; Nintendo Switch 2; PlayStation 5; Xbox Series X/S
- Release: PlayStation 4: JP: December 7, 2017; WW: August 28, 2018; Windows: WW: May 9, 2019; Xbox One: WW: July 30, 2020; Nintendo Switch 2: WW: November 13, 2025; PlayStation 5, Xbox Series X/S: WW: December 8, 2025
- Genres: Action-adventure, beat 'em up
- Mode: Single-player

Yakuza Kiwami 2 (Note: Japanese: 龍龍が如く 極 2, Hepburn: Ryū ga Gotoku Kiwami Tsū; lit. "Like a Dragon Extreme 2") is a 2017 action-adventure game developed by Ryu Ga Gotoku Studio and published by Sega. It is a remake of the 2006 video game Yakuza 2 for the PlayStation 2, the second remake in the Yakuza series following 2016's Yakuza Kiwami. It was developed using the Dragon Engine, previously used for Yakuza 6. The game was released for PlayStation 4 on December 7, 2017 in Japan, and worldwide on August 28, 2018. It was released for Windows worldwide on Steam on May 9, 2019 and released for Xbox One on July 30, 2020. A version for cloud-based platform Amazon Luna was released on January 19, 2023. It was released on Nintendo Switch 2 on November 13, 2025. Versions for PlayStation 5 and Xbox Series X/S were released on December 8, 2025.

Yakuza Kiwami 2 was followed up by the spinoff titles Fist of the North Star: Lost Paradise and Judgment in 2018, and the next mainline installment Yakuza: Like a Dragon in 2020. The Kiwami remake series was followed by a Yakuza 3 remake titled Yakuza Kiwami 3 & Dark Ties, released in February 2026.

== Gameplay ==
Yakuza Kiwami 2 is a remake of Yakuza 2, and is an action-adventure game set in an open world environment and played from a third-person perspective. Similar to the previous remake title, Yakuza Kiwami, Kiwami 2 follows the same plot structure of Yakuza 2 while adding new gameplay features and enhancements from later titles, as well as new story elements to resolve confusing plot points in the original release and tie the game more closely to other titles in the series. The player controls series protagonist Kazuma Kiryu as they explore the fictional Japanese districts of Kamurocho, Tokyo and Sotenbori, Osaka, based on the real life locations of Kabukicho and Dōtonbori, respectively. Combat is based on that previously seen in Yakuza 6, though with a variety of new moves and special cinematic 'Heat Moves'. A new story scenario, entitled "The Majima Saga" features recurring series anti-hero Goro Majima as a playable character. The Cabaret Club minigame from Yakuza 0 returns, as does the Clan Creator from Yakuza 6, bringing in New Japan Pro-Wrestling stars Keiji Mutoh, Masahiro Chono, Riki Choshu, Genichiro Tenryu, and Tatsumi Fujinami.

== Plot ==
A year after leaving his former life in the Tojo Clan behind, ex-yakuza Kazuma Kiryu (Takaya Kuroda) is called back into action when the clan's Fifth Chairman, Yukio Terada (Kenji Nomura), is murdered by assassins from a rival organization, the Omi Alliance. Returning to Kamurocho, Kiryu must find a new chairman for the Tojo Clan and prevent an all-out war between the Tojo and the Omi, bringing him into conflict with Ryuji Goda (Masami Iwasaki), the legendary "Dragon of Kansai" of the Omi Alliance. Kiryu also comes into contact with several new allies and enemies, including: Daigo Dojima (Satoshi Tokushige), the son of the late Dojima Family patriarch whose death was blamed on Kiryu; Kaoru Sayama (Aya Hisakawa), an Osakan police detective who has disdain for the yakuza; Jiro Kawara (Susumu Terajima), a veteran detective who is investigating the resurgence of the Korean syndicate Jingweon Mafia; Ryo Takashima (Hakuryu), an ambitious Omi Alliance lieutenant; and Wataru Kurahashi (Houka Kinoshita), the chief of the Tokyo Metropolitan Police Department's Foreign Affairs Division.

A new scenario, entitled "The Majima Saga", is centered around Goro Majima (Hidenari Ugaki) and explains how he came to leave the Tojo Clan following the death of his patriarch, Futoshi Shimano, a year earlier and form a legitimate enterprise, "Majima Construction", between the events of Yakuza and Yakuza 2.

=== Majima Saga ===
In February 2006, the Tojo Clan's Fifth Chairman Yukio Terada announces a reformation plan for the organization, which requires a replacement for the clan captain position. In the running for the position are newcomers, Akinobu Uematsu (Miou Tanaka) and Kei Ibuchi (Takehito Koyasu), as well as Goro Majima, all of whom were making the most profits among the clan. Majima, however, has no interest in the position and only participated to ensure the other families can band together to keep the newcomers from seizing power. Majima later returns to Kamurocho, where he finds himself ambushed by several assassins. After quickly dealing with them, Majima returns to his family office, where he finds his men supposedly beaten up by the Uematsu Family. Majima heads to Uematsu's office, but finds Uematsu himself having been killed.

After reporting the incident to Tojo Clan members, Majima is tipped by Kazama Family patriarch Osamu Kashiwagi (Shunsuke Sakuya) to find the Florist of Sai (Yoshiaki Fujiwara), an information broker who can assist him. Upon meeting with the Florist, he agrees to help Majima in exchange for the latter taking over his old base in the secret adult entertainment hub Purgatory. Majima learns that one of his subordinates, Ryota Kawamura (Naoto Takeda), was last seen at the crime scene. He travels to Sotenbori to track down Kawamura, and eventually learns that he's a regular gambler who frequents the massage parlor Hogushi Kaiken. While at the parlor, Majima receives service from Makoto Tateyama (Miyuki Sawashiro), a woman whom Majima saved from the Tojo Clan 18 years prior. (Note: As depicted in Yakuza 0) Majima, while attempting to hide his identity, learns that Makoto still keeps her old watch as a memento of her savior.

Majima later picks up a tip that Kawamura murdered an Omi Alliance officer at the Cabaret Grand. He heads there and confronts Kawamura. The latter is easily defeated, but is then killed by Ibuchi, who exploited Kawamura's debt and used him to get rid of Uematsu, in order to spark a war between the Omi Alliance and the Tojo Clan, which would lead to their eventual merging and Ibuchi seizing power from Terada. Majima defeats Ibuchi, but the latter commits suicide rather than allowing himself to be arrested to incite conflict between both sides. In the aftermath, Majima and Terada come to an agreement to disband his family, as a gesture of apology for Kawamura's action against the Omi Alliance. Majima and the remnants of his family then form Majima Construction, and begin work on the Kamurocho Hills complex. Some time later, Makoto leaves the country with her family; she receives an anonymous gift prior to her departure, which turns out to be a replacement strap for her watch. Realizing that her customer was her savior from 18 years ago, Makoto finds comfort knowing she has no regrets leaving Japan.

== Development ==
Yakuza Kiwami 2 was initially leaked on August 24, 2017 via a listing on the Taiwanese PlayStation Store. The title was officially announced two days later alongside Yakuza: Like a Dragon, Ryu ga Gotoku Online, and Fist of the North Star: Lost Paradise. The game runs on the Dragon Engine which was previously used in Yakuza 6: The Song of Life. Several characters were recast for the remake, including Hakuryu as Ryo Takashima, Houka Kinoshita as Wataru Kurahashi, and Yuichi Kimura as Tsutomo Bessho. The in-game arcade features playable versions of Virtua Fighter 2 and Virtual On: Cyber Troopers. An enhanced port of the game on Nintendo Switch 2, PlayStation 5, Xbox Series X/S and PC, with the latter platform receiving an update on the Steam version (which didn't have Traditional Chinese and Korean languages that were added on the Microsoft Store version), running on an updated version of the Dragon Engine, which features additional language support, including a new language to the series, in French, German, Italian, Spanish, Latin American Spanish, Brazilian Portuguese, Russian and Simplified Chinese, as well as pre-rendered cutscenes now running at 60fps, was released on November 13, 2025 on Nintendo Switch 2 and December 8 on other platforms.

== Music ==
Japanese rock band SiM provided the theme songs for Kiwami 2. The first song "A" serves as opening theme while the second song "The Sound of Breath" serves as an insert song. Both of these themes are also featured in the ending credits of the game.

== Reception ==
Reception

Aggregate scores
Aggregator	Score
Metacritic	PS4: 85/100; PC: 82/100; XONE: 88/100
OpenCritic	92% recommended (Note: Based on 129 reviews)

Review scores
Publication	Score
Computer Games Magazine	8.5/10
Destructoid	7.5/10
Easy Allies	8.5/10
Famitsu	37/40
Game Informer	9/10
GameRevolution	5/5
GameSpot	8/10
HobbyConsolas	91/100
IGN	8/10
RPGFan	85/100
Shacknews	9/10
PlayStation Universe	9/10

Yakuza Kiwami 2 was well received by critics. It is recommended by 93% of 114 critic reviews on review aggregator OpenCritic, with a top critic average of 86/100. It was the best selling game in Japan during its debut week, selling 131,931 units; this was the lowest debut for a Yakuza game, which was noted as expected due to being the first stand-alone PlayStation 4 title that is not a new main entry. The PC version was among the best-selling new releases of the month on Steam. (Note: Based on total revenue for the first two weeks on sale)

Famitsu liked the seamless transitions when entering shops or starting battles, and enjoyed being able to use various items in the city as weapons.

The game was nominated for the Freedom Tower Award for Best Remake at the New York Game Awards, and for "Animation, Technical" and "Game, Classic Revival" at the National Academy of Video Game Trade Reviewers Awards.

== Sequel ==
Yakuza Kiwami 2 was followed by a remake of 2009's Yakuza 3, called Yakuza Kiwami 3, which released worldwide on 12 February 2026 for PlayStation 4, PlayStation 5, Nintendo Switch 2, Windows, and Xbox Series X/S. The game also includes a new story mode called Dark Ties which follows the rise of Yoshitaka Mine (the main antagonist of Yakuza 3 and Kiwami 3) to the top of the Tojo Clan.
