= Yakuza 2 =

2006 video game

- North American cover art
- Developer: New Entertainment R&D Dept. (Note: HD Edition developed by Ryu Ga Gotoku Studio.)
- Publisher: Sega
- Director: Ryuta Ueda
- Producer: Masayoshi Kikuchi
- Designers: Takeshi Tanaka; Daisuke Sato
- Programmers: Tetsuya Kaku; Koji Tokieda
- Artist: Daisuke Sato
- Writers: Masayoshi Yokoyama; Makoto Itakura; Hase Seishū
- Composers: Hidenori Shoji; Hideki Sakamoto; Norihiko Hibino; Takahiro Izutani
- Series: Yakuza
- Platforms: PlayStation 2; PlayStation 3; Wii U
- Release: PlayStation 2: JP: December 7, 2006; NA: September 9, 2008; EU: September 19, 2008; AU: September 25, 2008; PlayStation 3: JP: November 1, 2012; Wii U: JP: August 8, 2013
- Genres: Action-adventure, beat 'em up
- Mode: Single-player

Yakuza 2 (Note: Japanese: 龍が如く2, Hepburn: Ryū ga Gotoku Tsū; lit. "Like a Dragon 2") is a 2006 action-adventure game developed and published by Sega for the PlayStation 2. The second installment of the Yakuza series and the sequel to Yakuza, it was released on December 7, 2006, in Japan and in September 2008 in North America and Europe.

The game focuses on the former yakuza Kazuma Kiryu who receives a request for help from his former group, the Tojo Clan yakuza of eastern Japan, to stabilize relationships with the Omi Alliance group of western Japan. Across Kiryu's journey, he learns of a Korean mafia group linked with both the Omi and his own past, and becomes the rival of the Omi's "Dragon of Kansai", Ryuji Goda.

Yakuza 2 introduced several new gameplay features. Sega wished to improve the fighting engine based on fan input to provide a more rich experience. The story was aimed to feature a deep adult love story, something not seen in the previous game. Additionally, for the western versions the original Japanese audio was kept in contrast to the previous game which contained English audio.

Critical reception to Yakuza 2 was positive, with reviewers praising the presentation and fighting system. Yakuza 2 was followed up by a spinoff, Yakuza Kenzan, in 2008, and then by a direct sequel, Yakuza 3, in 2009. A remake of the game titled Yakuza Kiwami 2 was released in 2017 for the PlayStation 4, and later ported to Windows and Xbox One.

== Plot ==
=== Setting ===
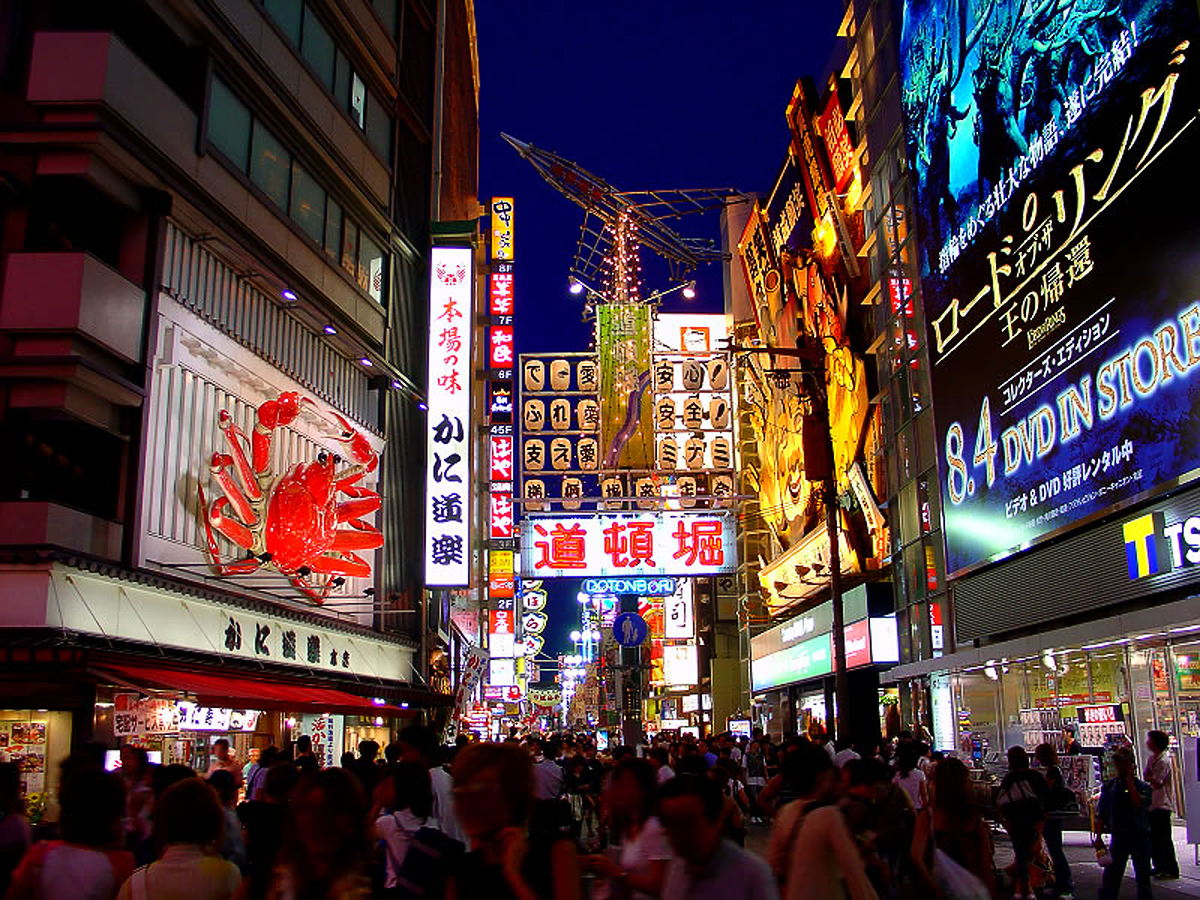
Sotenbori area is modeled after Osaka's Dōtonbori (道頓堀).

Half of the game takes place in Tokyo's Shinjuku ward, most noticeably a recreation of Shinjuku's red-light district Kabukichō renamed Kamurocho.

The other half takes place in Osaka, with the fictitious Sotenbori and Shinseicho areas modeled after Osaka's respectively Dōtonbori and Shinsekai districts. Although these areas were recreated as fictionalized versions, many real life landmarks remain such as Dōtonbori's Sammy Ebisu Plaza (サミー戎プラザ) and Shinsekai's Tsutenkaku Tower (通天閣) and Billiken (ビリケン).

=== Story ===
In December 2006, Kazuma Kiryu and Haruka Sawamura are living a peaceful life, but Tojo Clan chairman Yukio Terada appears and asks for his help in preventing a war between the Tojo and the Osaka-based Omi Alliance. The group is ambushed by Omi assassins and Terada is fatally shot, asking Kiryu to negotiate peace in his place. Kiryu recruits former comrade Daigo Dojima to become the new chairman, and the two travel to Osaka, where Kiryu forms a rivalry with the Omi chairman Jin Goda's son, Ryuji. Ryuji refuses the idea of a truce between the Omi and the Tojo and attempts to stage a coup, but they are interrupted and arrested by the Osaka police, led by Detective Kaoru Sayama. Sayama makes a deal with Kiryu to help him stop the Omi threat in exchange for information on the Tojo, as she believes they are connected to her parents' disappearance as a child.

Kiryu and Sayama discover that Omi patriarchs Ryo Takashima and Toranosuke Sengoku have placed hits on them, and that Daigo and Jin Goda have been kidnapped. The two escape to Tokyo, where they find Detectives Makoto Date and Jiro Kawara investigating a bombing of the Kazama family offices by the Jingweon Mafia, a Korean syndicate thought to have been massacred by the Tojo in 1980. Fearing an invasion by the Omi and Jingweon, Kiryu recruits former allies Goro Majima and the Florist of Sai for help and rescues Daigo as well as preventing a coup staged by Koji Shindo, the second patriarch of the Nishikiyama Family. During Terada's funeral, Ryuji warns the Tojo that he will give them three days to mourn, after which his men will attack Kamurocho.

Kiryu and Sayama learn that three Jingweon men survived the massacre and went into hiding. The two find a survivor in Osaka, who claims that the Jingweon will not stop until either they or the Tojo are destroyed. The survivor also reveals that the Jingweon boss's wife Sueyon and her child survived the massacre thanks to Kawara, but is assassinated before he can reveal more. Sengoku kidnaps Haruka to trap Kiryu, but Kiryu defeats all of Sengoku's forces. Sengoku attempts to flee, only for Ryuji to kill him, out of disgust for Sengoku's willingness to hurt children.

Date discovers Tokyo Metropolitan Police Superintendent Wataru Kurahashi is a Jingweon survivor and has been using his position to conceal the Jingweon's operations. Kurahashi takes Date and the Florist of Sai hostage and plans to bomb the room, only for Kiryu, Sayama and Kawara to arrive and defeat him. Kurahashi reveals to Sayama that her parents are Kawara and Suyeon. While they are distracted by this, Kurahashi shoots Kawara, before being shot by Sayama. Before dying, Kawara admits Suyeon was killed by the Jingweon after Sayama's birth as she refused to partake in Jingweon's quest for revenge, and he gave her and Suyeon's other child away to different families to keep them safe and ruthlessly hunted down members of the syndicate in doing so. The Florist of Sai discovers the Jingweon have placed bombs throughout Tokyo and plan to detonate them on the anniversary of the massacre, when Ryuji intends to invade the city.

On the night of the invasion, Kiryu and his allies disarm the bombs and defeat Ryuji's men. Ryuji challenges Kiryu to a final battle atop the Kamurocho Hills construction site. Arriving, Kiryu also finds chairman Goda and Sayama, who attempts to dissuade Ryuji from fighting after learning from Kurahashi's files that he is Suyeon's other child. Undeterred, Ryuji battles Kiryu, ultimately losing. Terada appears and reveals that he was the last survivor and the Jingweon's leader. He believed that gaining Kiryu's trust and faking his death would trigger a war between the Tojo and the Omi so that the Jingweon could destroy them both and fill the power vacuum. Kiryu defeats Terada's men, but Takashima appears and shoots Kiryu, who covered up Terada's truth in exchange for power. However, Takashima kills chairman Goda and Terada to usurp them, telling Kiryu that he never cared about the Jingweon's quest for revenge in the first place.

Terada reveals a hidden time bomb as he dies and Takashima attempts to launch his final attack, but is killed by Ryuji. Believing neither of them can escape in time given their wounds, Ryuji and Kiryu have a final battle, with Kiryu emerging victorious as Ryuji acknowledges Kiryu's strength and dies in his half-sister's arms. Unable to move due to his injuries, Kiryu tells Sayama to run, but she elects to stay with him to the end. The bomb turns out to have had its fuse removed by Terada from the beginning, because he knew that Takashima would betray him. Some times later, Kiryu and Haruka visit Terada's grave, while also joined by Sayama.

== Development ==
Yakuza 2 was announced in August 2006 with Sega promising an improved fighting system and further exploration. Nagoshi commented on some of his goals with Yakuza 2. In addition to providing a deeper dramatic storyline over what was found in the original, the game also has some themes that were not in the original, including an adult love story. The Sega team considered fan input when making changes to Yakuza 2. One of the main aims in developing Yakuza 2 was improving its fighting engine. Accounting for fights against multiple opponents was one of the most important things that were considered when improving the fighting engine. It was made much easier, for instance, to attack foes that come at the player character from multiple directions, and to switch targets in the middle of a combo in order to quickly take out someone who may have snuck up on your flank. As a result, the fighting system was polished and the staff believed they succeeded. In localizing the game, the Japanese audio was kept instead of producing an English dub. This proved no difficulties. The team also added more Heat moves to make the fights more exciting.

The director of the voice recordings discouraged the voice actors from falling back on the cliches of anime character acting. When scenes involving characters exchanging insults and threatening each other take on cartoon cadences, the sense of tension and suspense evaporates. The decision not to use an overblown style of acting was what the composer thought it added to the distinctive dramatic feel of the series. This is the first game in the series to feature only Japanese voice acting for its U.S. and PAL release as a response to the criticism of the English voice acting in the first game.

=== Soundtrack ===
The Ryū ga Gotoku & Ryū ga Gotoku 2 Original Sound Track (HCV-287) dual-disc boxset was published by Wave Master in Japan on January 25, 2007. The music was composed by Hidenori Shoji, Hideki Sakamoto, Norihiko Hibino and Takahiro Izutani. During the development of Super Monkey Ball: Banana Blitz for the Wii, Sega sound manager Haruyoshi Tomita became interested in the company's approach to sound design. As it so happened, Sakamoto was a huge fan of the original Yakuza game, so being commissioned for the sequel was not the kind of offer that he was about to pass up. Shoji had developed a stimulating guitar sound for the game, so he was interested in seeing what he could do with piano compositions. His use of instruments and editing techniques offered ample resources for him to study upon entering the production side of the series. His own compositional style has its roots in classical music, which might be one distinction that helped differentiate their musical approaches. To write music that complements the compelling depth of the narrative, it was necessary to proceed from the point of view of bridging the gap between the scenarist and the player.

As with the first game a classic gospel, this time Franz Gruber's Silent Night, Holy Night (Stille Nacht, heilige Nacht), is sung in English by Eri Kawai. Singer So Yoki performs Kamuro Setsugekka (神室雪月花).

== Marketing ==
In order to make realistic recreations of Tokyo's Kabukicho and Osaka's Dōtonbori, Sega made 17 tie-in with famous Japanese companies. As a result, some places found in the game, such as the Don Quijote discount store, the Club Sega game centers and the Matsuya (松屋) restaurants (replacing its unlicensed version called Akagyu) are modeled after the real life buildings. The Tōkaidō Shinkansen high-speed train is also featured in the game.

In order to support the game's expensive production, Sega used product placement strategy and introduced ads within the game. This includes the Japanese coffee brand Boss Coffee, numerous brands of alcohol appearing in the game's bars and pubs including Suntory Whiskey, Jack Daniel's Bourbon or Carlsberg Beer.

Famous real life arcades are included in the game. Sega's UFO Catcher crane game machine is included as a minigame, and arcade cabinets of Virtua Fighter 4 can be seen in the Club Sega game centers.

== Reception ==
Reception

Aggregate score
Aggregator	Score
Metacritic	77/100

Review scores
Publication	Score
1Up.com	B+
Eurogamer	8/10
Famitsu	38/40
GameFan	Very Good
GameSpot	7.5/10
GameZone	8.5/10
IGN	8.5/10
GameDaily	8/10

Famitsu gave the game a score of 38 out of 40. IGN gave Yakuza 2 a score of 8.5 out of 10, and GameFan gave the game a score of Very Good, as well as their 'Best PlayStation 2 Game' award for 2008. Eurogamer rated the game eight out of ten.

=== Sales ===
In the week of its release in Japan, Yakuza 2 sold 281,836 copies. As of December 31, 2006, it sold 550,000 copies. It was the 98th best-selling game in Japan in 2008 selling 136,809 copies that year, while it was the third best-selling PlayStation 2 game in its release year, 2006, reaching lifetime sales of 827,978 in Japan. Only 40,000 copies were sold in North America.

== Releases ==
The Japanese version of the game, Ryū Ga Gotoku 2, was ported to the PlayStation 3 and Wii U consoles. This remastered edition of the second game in the series is bundled with the original Japanese version of the first game. Both compilations were released in Japan.

=== PlayStation 3 ===
On November 1, 2012, a PlayStation 3 HD remaster of the Japanese original version of Yakuza and Yakuza 2 titled Ryu Ga Gotoku 1&2 HD edition was released in Japan. This "HD edition" features both game remasters bundled in a single Blu-ray disc and later in a ~19GB downloadable file.

On December 11, 2014, this "HD edition" was re-released in the budget range "PlayStation 3 the Best" dedicated to best sellers on the Japanese domestic market. Simultaneous to this Blu-ray re-release, an 18.1GB downloadable version was also made available for purchase on the Japanese PlayStation Store.

=== Wii U ===
On August 8, 2013, a Wii U HD remaster of the Japanese original version of Yakuza and Yakuza 2 titled Ryu Ga Gotoku 1&2 HD for Wii U was released in Japan. This "HD for Wii U" release features both game remasters bundled in a single disc or in a 19.8GB file for download. This Wii U release is notable for being the first Yakuza/Like a Dragon title on a non-Sony platform and remained as the only Yakuza release on a Nintendo console until the Nintendo Switch port of Yakuza Kiwami released in 2024.

=== Yakuza Kiwami 2 ===
A remake of Yakuza 2, titled Yakuza Kiwami 2, was released on December 7, 2017 in Japan for PlayStation 4, and was later released worldwide on August 28, 2018. This remake is built on the Dragon Engine previously used in Yakuza 6: The Song of Life. Similar to 2016's Yakuza: Kiwami, the remake adds new elements not seen in the previous release, including a new playable story campaign for Goro Majima that continues story threads for the character that began in Yakuza 0.
