= Yakuza 3 =

2009 video game

- North American cover art
- Developer: Sega CS1 R&D (Note: Ryu Ga Gotoku Studio developed the remastered version. Ported to Windows by QLOC.)
- Publisher: Sega
- Director: Daisuke Sato
- Producer: Masayoshi Kikuchi
- Designer: Kazuki Hosokawa
- Programmer: Tetsuya Kaku
- Artist: Kazuki Hosokawa
- Writer: Masayoshi Yokoyama
- Composer: Hidenori Shoji
- Series: Yakuza
- Platforms: PlayStation 3; PlayStation 4; Windows; Xbox One
- Release: PlayStation 3: JP: February 26, 2009; NA: March 9, 2010; AU: March 11, 2010; EU: March 12, 2010; PlayStation 4: JP: August 9, 2018; WW: August 20, 2019; Windows, Xbox One: WW: January 28, 2021
- Genres: Action-adventure, beat 'em up
- Mode: Single-player

Yakuza 3 (Note: Japanese: 龍が如く3, Hepburn: Ryū ga Gotoku Surī; lit. "Like a Dragon 3") is a 2009 action-adventure game developed and published by Sega for the PlayStation 3. The third main entry in the Like a Dragon series, it was released in Japan and South East Asia on February 26, 2009, and in North America and Europe on March 9, 2010, and March 12, 2010. A remaster containing all cut content was released in Japan on August 9, 2018, and worldwide on August 20, 2019, for the PlayStation 4, and on January 28, 2021, for Windows and Xbox One. A sequel, Yakuza 4, was released on March 18, 2010, in Japan. A remake, Yakuza Kiwami 3 & Dark Ties, was released on February 12, 2026.

== Gameplay ==
=== Features ===
Yakuza 3 introduces PlayStation Network Trophies to the series with 45 trophies (50 in the Eastern releases). It adds four gameplay elements:

- Seamless Battle (シームレスバトル shimuresu batoru): Seamless Battle is a streaming data-based loading-free system that allows the game to directly connect the adventure mode and the battle mode (called "Kenka") without the usual loading black screen.
- Chase Battle (チェイスバトル, cheisu batoru): Chase Battle is a new battle mode which replaces the regular brawling (Kenka) with a running sequence set within a certain area. Both the chaser and chased have a stamina gauge that decreases naturally as the character runs, by being hit with a thrown object or by colliding with a passer-by. When the stamina gauge is empty the exhausted character stops the chase. During the game a minor character, Mack Shinozuka, will train Kiryu to improve his running performance.
- Revelation (天啓, tenkei): Ten revelations, spread throughout the game, will allow Kazuma Kiryu to learn new Heat Actions (ヒートアクション) in Adventure mode; it is similar to the system introduced in the previous game Ryū ga Gotoku: Kenzan!. This time Kazuma uses the built-in camera on his cell phone to record new moves and techniques. These are acquired through hints and incidents spotted in First Person View. Learned Heat Actions are posted on Kazuma's personal blog, called "Kamuroblo", which uses the same template as general director Toshihiro Nagoshi's own blog.
- First Person View: When pressing the DualShock 3's R3 button during the adventure mode, the standard third person view switches to a brand new first person mode. This perspective allows a better observation of the streets and people, but looking some people in the eyes using First Person View will provoke them and they will attack. First Person View is disabled in some indoor places and at certain angles.

=== Event Mode ===
The main story spans twelve chapters plus a prologue. As with the earlier games, each chapter is preceded by a cinematic, called an "event scene", which later becomes available in the Gallery mode. Skipping these scenes using the Start button can only be done after enabling the scene-skipping option in the menu, which is switched off by default. The western version of Yakuza 3 features 295 minutes of cutscenes according to the BBFC.

Six sub-scenarios ("Date's Pride", "Two Fathers", "Hometown Girl", "The Finishing Touch", "Silver Screen Dragon", and "Murder at Café Alps") are special missions featuring "event scene" cinematics.

=== Adventure Mode ===
In the eastern releases, the main story is complemented with 123 unique side stories called "sub-scenarios" ("substory" in the original version, サブストーリー sabustori). These sub-scenarios are divided into two classes: Mission and Hitman. There are 103 standard missions, some of which are made up of different episodes, and 20 hitman sub-scenarios. Fifteen of these bounty hunter sidestories are located in Kamurocho, the remaining five in Ryukyu.

Twenty minigames are available within Adventure mode. These are aromatherapy massage (eastern releases only), darts, pool, karaoke, bowling, mahjong (eastern releases only), chinchirorin, shogi (eastern releases only), chō-han, koi-koi, oicho-kabu, roulette, poker, blackjack, Answer & Answer (eastern releases only), UFO Catcher, batting cage, golf, surf fishing and Boxcelios. 2-player support for some of these mini games and an expansion for Answer & Answer are added through DLC, as well as main menu direct access in the eastern releases. However, the quiz minigame's expansion was eventually removed from the western release and 2-player support became a time limited DLC exclusive to the North American release's Challenge Pack. Challenges like Mack Shinozuka's training, Inner Fighter 7 and Haruka's Request aren't considered either mini games or side stories.

Beating the game in "Hard" mode unlocks the "Ex-Hard" (extreme hard) extra difficulty level. Completing the game in any difficulty mode will create a "cleared data" save file and unlock "Premium New Game" and "Premium Adventure". The first allows to restart the game with all accumulated money, items, experience levels and fighting techniques. The latter is a free-run mode dedicated to exploration and completion as it doesn't include the main story, with only sub-scenarios remaining (though a small number of missions will only appear at a certain point in story mode, and cannot be triggered in Premium Adventure). Extra game contents are added through DLC.

=== Battle Mode ===
As with the previous games, the Underground Coliseum (闘技場, Tōgijō) is available. An illicit mixed martial arts competition sponsored by Majima is held in the area beneath Kamurocho Hills, formerly Purgatory. The arena is inspired by real life Japanese cage fighting competitions such as K-1 World Grand Prix; gameplay is similar to fighting games Toshihiro Nagoshi previously worked on such as Virtua Fighter 5 and SpikeOut. Single Tournament has 50 unique international fighters (a minor character with its own profile) and 11 grand prix tournaments to choose from. These 3-round competitions have various rings, rules and difficulty levels; the different types of tournament are Exhibition Tournament, Street Fight GP, Breakout GP, Heat GP, Bounding GP, Bomber GP, Golden Glove GP, Weapon Master GP, Hyper GP, Magnum Force GP and Maximum GP. Tag Tournament is a two-partner team match including 20 unique teams. Each team is made of paired Single Tournament fighters enhanced with a special duo attack. There are 2 available grand prix named Tag Match GP and Twin Dragon GP. Three Single Tournament fighters and two Encounter Battle characters will join Kazuma Kiryu's "Team Dragon" ("Team The Dragon" in the original release) as tag partners once he finds them in the Adventure Mode; these are boxer Maxim Soldatov (マクシム・ソルダドフ), kenpō Bruce Ebinuma (ブルース海老沼), puroresu Daiji Hiyama (桧山 大治), Keigo Kanno (神野 慶吾) and Masaki Hatae (波多江 真幸). Orders can be given to these partners using the DualShock 3's arrow keys.

Completing the story mode unlocks 35 additional Battle Missions gathered in a bonus mode called Final Competition (究極闘技, Kyōkyoku Tōgi; Ultimate Contest). The first competition has 10 missions and is called "Melee Competition" (乱戦闘技, Ransen Tōgi), the second has 5 missions and is called "Showdown Competition" (対決闘技, Taiketsu Tōgi), the third has 10 missions and is called "Trial Competition" (試練闘技, Shiren Tōgi), and fourth competition has 5 missions and is called "Cooperation Competition". Completing these four competitions unlocks a fifth competition called the Final Competition (究極闘技, Kyōkyoku Tōgi) which has 5 missions. Completing all 35 missions with an "S" rank, the highest rank possible, unlocks a special item delivered by Bob Utsunomiya, which is a talisman called the Fighting God's Talisman ((闘神の護符, Tatagami no Gofū) that, when equipped, permanently maintains the Heat Gauge at maximum level.

Once story mode is completed the player can start a Premium Adventure and meet a hidden minor character (a clairvoyant woman) who allows access to four exclusive modes (専用モード, Senyō mōdo) added through DLC, only available in a special edition of the game in Europe, and as a preorder bonus in North America. In Survival Battle Kazuma Kiryu must find and defeat the "Last Boss" (ラスボス, rasu bosu), Yoshitaka Mine; eight bonus bosses are disseminated within Kamurocho. In Survival Onigokko, Kazuma Kiryu is chased by Bob Utsunomiya in Kamurocho, with ten missions to complete in 3 minutes. All Star Tournament is an extra Arena single tournament that involves all 8 boss characters plus Goh Hamazaki, the latter of which can only be fought in this mode. All Star Tag Tournament is an extra tag tournament that pits Kazuma Kiryu and his fighting partner Goro Majima against 7 teams of bosses and bonus characters such as Kazuki, Yuya, Goh Hamazaki and Komaki.

=== Completion ===
The quest for the disseminated 100 coin lockers (half of them hidden in Kamurocho, the others in Ryukyu) is rewarded with the "Key Collector" Silver PSN Trophy. The latter was called "Kagi no Hōrōsha" (鍵の放浪者) (lit. "vagrant keys") and was only Bronze level in the Eastern releases. As a mixed game including elements of the sandbox game and RPG genres, Yakuza 3 includes a "Completion" feature that sums up what percentage of the game was actually completed by the player.

Only 100% completion (Completion + Sub-Scenario) will unlock the final mission involving a recurring hidden all-black character named Jo Amon 亞門 丈 (Amon Jo), a.k.a. "Mysterious Hitman", a returning character from the spinoff and a secret boss available since the original Yakuza title. In Yakuza 3, Jo Amon's weapon is dual light sabers.

== Plot ==
=== Setting ===
Yakuza 3 continues the adventures of Kazuma Kiryu, picking up after the events of Yakuza 2. The game takes place both in Kamurochō, a fictionalized version of Tokyo's red-light district Kabukicho, from the first two games, and in a brand new location called Downtown Ryukyu, located in Naha, Okinawa.

The area of Okinawa where the story takes place is a fictional area, based upon Naha's Makishi district. It includes real life landmarks such as the Ichiba Hondori (linked to Mutsumibashi Dori and Heiwa Dori) covered shopping arcade renamed "Karyushi Arcade" (かりゅしアーケード, karyushi ākēdo) in the game as well as the popular Makishi Public Market shortened "Public Market" (公設市場, Kōsetsu Ichiba), the famous entertainment strip Kokusai Street called "Ryukyu Street" (琉球通り, Ryūkyū Doori), the Okinawa Monorail Kencho-mae Station as "Ryukyugai-mae Station" (琉球街前, Ryūkyūgai Mae) or the Mitsukoshi department store (Okinawa Mitsukoshi) which kept its actual name as part of the game's tie-in policy.

=== Synopsis ===
In January 2007, after ending the war with the Omi Alliance, Kazuma Kiryu (Takaya Kuroda) and Haruka Sawamura (Rie Kugimiya) visit the cemetery where their loved ones rest. They are joined by Kaoru Sayama (Yū Daiki), who is preparing to leave for the United States. Kiryu accepts custody of an orphanage in Okinawa, hoping to raise orphans like his adoptive father, Shintaro Kazama, raised him. Before leaving, he enlists Goro Majima (Hidenari Ugaki) to assist Daigo Dojima (Satoshi Tokushige), Kiryu's successor, in his duties as Tojo Clan chairman.

A year later, Kiryu has settled into the orphanage and is dealing with eviction notices from the Ryudo Family, who owns the land the orphanage is built on. He confronts the Ryudo captain Rikiya Shimabukuro (Tatsuya Fujiwara), and meets the family's patriarch, Shigeru Nakahara (Shigeru Izumiya), who informs Kiryu that the land is wanted for a seaside resort. Kiryu refuses to close the orphanage, despite Nakahara's threats. The following week, Rikiya asks Kiryu for help in finding Nakahara's adoptive daughter, Saki (Umeka Shōji). Kiryu and Rikiya learn that Saki's mother is working with Tetsuo Tamashiro (Unshō Ishizuka), the patriarch of a rival family, who plans to use Saki as leverage to seize Nakahara's territory. Kiryu defeats Tamashiro and banishes his gang, and Saki returns to Nakahara when her mother rejects her. Nakahara pledges an oath to Kiryu in return. Daigo later meets with them and reveals that Tamashiro was recruited to secure the land in a scheme tied to Defense Minister Ryuzo Tamiya's (Akio Otsuka) "Military Base Expansion Bill". Daigo refuses to involve the Tojo Clan with the resort.

In March 2009, Daigo and Nakahara are shot in separate incidents, leaving Daigo comatose and the deed to the orphanage stolen. Kiryu learns from Saki that Nakahara's shooter is a man resembling Kazama, much to his shock. He travels to Kamurocho and meets Osamu Kashiwagi (Shunsuke Sakuya), Kazama's successor, who is assassinated. (Note: Yakuza: Like a Dragon (2020) and Like a Dragon: Infinite Wealth (2024) establish that Kashiwagi, Lau, and Richardson survived their apparent deaths, leading to their reappearances in said games and subsequent titles.) Fleeing from the scene, Kiryu is rescued by his old friend Makoto Date (Kazuhiro Yamaji), who informs him of three Tojo Clan lieutenants who are suspects in Kashiwagi's death: Yoshitaka Mine (Nakamura Shidō II), chairman of the Hakuho Clan; Goh Hamazaki (George Takahashi), a patriarch with ties to the Yokohama triads; and Tsuyoshi Kanda (Hiroyuki Miyasako), who controls Akira Nishikiyama's former gang.

Kiryu and Rikiya interrogate Kanda, and learn he is uninvolved. Kiryu later learns that Majima was contracted to build the resort, at the behest of Hamazaki who is working with Kiryu's old nemesis, Lau Ka Long (Shinichi Takizawa). Lau has Rikiya kidnapped and forces Kiryu to fight him. Rikiya is saved by Nakahara's shooter, who kills Lau. Kiryu later meets Mine, who presents him with Kanda's severed head as both a scare tactic and a peace offering. Mine also reveals that Hamazaki has disappeared, and his men have been killed, presumably by the triads.

Minister Tamiya meets with Kiryu and Date, and reveals that the Military Base Expansion Bill is part of a CIA operation to eliminate an arms smuggling group known as "Black Monday", and Nakahara's shooter is Kazama's brother Joji (Tetsuya Watari), who is a senior CIA operative. Tamiya agrees to stop the resort if Kiryu protects his former secretary from a planned hit by Joji. Kiryu intercepts Joji and defeats him. Returning home, Kiryu finds the orphanage in ruins; Mine had promised Tamashiro a share of the resort for securing the remaining land. Nakahara is attacked by bulls in Tamashiro's bullring hideout; just as he is about to be gored, Saki regains her voice and calls out to him, giving him the vigor to toss the bull away. Kiryu defeats Tamashiro, who attempts to shoot him from behind; Rikiya defends Kiryu and is fatally wounded. Joji kills Tamashiro, while the dying Rikiya asks Kiryu to stop Mine.

Joji has a jet fly Kiryu to Tokyo. Kiryu arrives at Touto University Hospital where Daigo is being treated, where he defeats the Hakuho Clan and a rogue CIA team led by Joji's colleague, Andre Richardson (Charles Glover). He locates Mine and Daigo on the hospital roof. Mine reveals that he idolizes Daigo, intending to euthanize him and take over the Tojo Clan. After Kiryu defeats Mine in combat, Richardson arrives with his team and reveals himself to be the leader of Black Monday. Before he can kill Mine and Kiryu, Daigo wakes up and kills Richardson's agents. Mine sacrifices himself to save Daigo and Kiryu by tackling Richardson off the roof to their deaths.

The next day, Kiryu bids farewell to his friends Kazuki (Hiroshi Tsuchida) and Yuya (Kenta Miyake) as he and Haruka prepare to go home. Kiryu is confronted by Hamazaki, who blames him for his misfortune and stabs Kiryu before Kazuki and Yuya subdue him. In a post-credits scene, Kiryu is revealed to have survived the stabbing as he rests at the orphanage.

== Development ==
The game's default video output is 720p HD graphics rendering at a resolution of 1024x768 without anti-aliasing but it supports 1080p mode upscale.

Daisuke Tomoda, CS1 Team (Sega CS R&D) visual artist and character design team leader of the Yakuza series since the original episode, partially unveiled Yakuza 3`s development at the 2009 Game Tools & Middleware Forum seminar held in Tokyo on June 15. Yakuza 3 character designing began shortly after the completion of Ryū ga Gotoku Kenzan! in 2008 with a three-week project phase followed by an eight months production. In the end, 110 high polygon characters, for they appear in Event Scene cinematics, plus 250 minor characters, were created by 60 teams producing a dozen characters each. Thus, 360 characters were produced following a "one person one body" philosophy and a three-day-per-body target schedule. As a comparison, the production of Yakuza on PlayStation 2 took ten months and had no more volume. The series' production pace is one game per year since the original Yakuza in 2005. CS1 used a slogan to describe the game's graphics: "Not Reality but Real (リアリティではなくリアル, Riariti de wa naku riaru).

=== Magical V-Engine ===
As with the previous PlayStation 3 Ryū ga Gotoku game, main characters have their face scanned through Cyberware's head & face color 3D scanner (model PS). As detailed at the GTMF 2009, Event Scene cinematics are real-time and render highly detailed XSI 6.5 2.5MB data size characters using 18,000~20,000 polygons each; 3D model bones are made of 107 meshes with 64 used for the body and the remaining 43 used for the face. In addition, the PlayStation 3 employs advanced graphics technologies without LOD, texture size 512×512 front buffer with 512×512 back buffer, diffuse map and normal map, multi map (ambient occlusion, specular mask, 8-bit specular power RGB) within cutscene. These Event Scene cinematics fully exploit Sega's in-house facial expressions engine called Magical V-Engine. This engine is based on a unique "wrinkle shader" technology 皺シェーダー (Shiwa shēdā) that allows for advanced facial animation from voice recordings alone. By animating based upon not only the phonetic lip syncing but tone, the software can emulate the basic human emotions in full facial expression.

== Audio ==
Yakuza 3 outputs uncompressed or compressed audio, respectively Linear PCM 2ch/5.1ch (stereo or surround) and Dolby Digital 5.1 surround.

=== Cast ===
The game's main characters have their face modeled in 3D after their voice actors, who are Japanese celebrities. Softimage XSI 3D data is obtained by scanning a human head with Cyberware Inc.'s latest scanner. These include returning voice actors Takaya Kuroda (as Kazuma Kiryu), Rie Kugimiya (as Haruka Sawamura), Hidenari Ugaki as (Goro Majima), and TV actor Satoshi Tokushige (as Daigo Dojima).

New cast additions to this entry of the Yakuza series are: Tatsuya Fujiwara as Rikiya Shimabukuro, who is best known for his role as Shuya Nanahara in Battle Royale and Battle Royale II: Requiem, Nakamura Shidō II as Yoshitaka Mine, who featured in Ronny Yu's Jet Li is Fearless, actor Tetsuya Watari as Joji Kazama, coincidentally famous for his yakuza roles in Seijun Suzuki's Tokyo Drifter, Kinji Fukasaku's Graveyard of Honor and Takeshi Kitano's Brother, singers and tarento Shigeru Izumiya as Shigeru Nakahara and George Takahashi as Goh Hamazaki, voice actor Akio Ōtsuka as Ryuzo Tamiya, tarento Daisuke Miyakawa as Mikio Aragaki and Hiroyuki Miyasako as Tsuyoshi Kanda.

=== Soundtrack ===
The Ryū ga Gotoku 3 Original Soundtrack (HCV-452) was published by Wave Master in Japan on February 26, 2009. It was bundled as a bonus enhanced CD in the Yakuza 3 PAL version's standard deluxe edition called the Battle Pack. The music was composed by Hidenori Shoji, Kentaro Koyama, Takahiro Kai, Hiroyoshi Kato, Yoshio Tsuru and Hideki Sakamoto, and includes a track by Love Sound System (DJ Giuliano, Ayako, Yoshiji Kobayashi). Performers are Minako Obata (a.k.a. Mooki), Chihiro Aoki (chorus) and Mitsuharu Fukuyama (trumpet). Two karaoke minigame songs are also included, performed by voice actors Takaya Kuroda (Kazuma Kiryu) and Rie Kugimiya (Haruka Sawamura).

Additional soundtrack includes three songs by Japanese rock music artist Eikichi Yazawa (exclusive to the Japanese version, as the western releases removes them and replaces them with original pieces due to licensing issues).

- Main Theme Song: Loser by Eikichi Yazawa. This main theme was released as a title track single by Garuru Records, the artist's own indie label (GRRC-7), on February 25, 2009.
- Ending Theme Song: Omoi Ga Afuretara (想いがあふれたら) by Eikichi Yazawa from Your Songs 2 released by Toshiba EMI in 2006 (TOCT-26004) and re-released in 2009 by Garuru Records (GRRC-2). This is a reprise of the original version released on his 1997 album Yes.
- Insert Song: Jikan yo Tomare (Subway Express 2 Version) (時間よ止まれ ~SUBWAY EXPRESS 2 バージョン~) by Eikichi Yazawa from his album Subway Express 2 released by Toshiba-EMI in 2002 (TOCT-24840).

== Downloadable content ==
=== Eastern releases ===
Eight packages of downloadable content (DLC) were delivered through a weekly game update campaign starting on March 5, 2009, with one DLC per week. These downloadable contents consist of:

- eight Item packs and eight S-Item packs delivered in-game by a minor character named Bob Utsunomiya
- 2-player support for five mini-games (pool, darts, bowling, golf and Answer & Answer)
- two add-ons (Yakuza quiz series for Answer & Answer and Rank Ex-SSS for Haruka's Request)
- three extra costumes for Kazuma Kiryu, Rikiya Shimabukuro and Haruka Sawamura (costume selection per character is four).

Four Premium Adventure exclusive modes are also added through DLC, these are:

- Survival Battle
- Survival Onigokko (サバイバル鬼ごっこ, Sabaibaru Onigokko)
- All-Star Tournament
- All-Star Tag Tournament

=== Western releases ===
==== Regular DLC ====
Four lots of DLC were delivered on release day with the PAL version's Battle Pack (also known as the Premium Pack). These free downloadable contents are:

- Battle For Survival: Take on all the bosses of Yakuza 3 as Kazuma (previously known as "Survival Battle" in the Japanese version).
- All-Star Tournament: 7 character tournament (completed game save file required to access content).
- All-Star Tag Tournament: 8 team tournament (completed game save file required to access content).
- Haruka's Request: This unique series of challenge missions will send Kazuma on a task of exploration throughout the entire Yakuza 3 world, playing minigames and entertaining Haruka (completed game save file required to access content).

All this DLC is also in the Japanese version. Regarding the western release of the DLC, a Sega America spokesperson officially stated on February 24, 2010: "[T]he western versions of the game will come pre-packaged with codes for the DLC, already localized and ready to be enjoyed".

==== Extra DLC ====
Two exclusive extra DLC codes were sent only to North American customers who pre-ordered Yakuza 3 in their local GameStop stores. These additional downloadable contents were:

- 2 player mini-games (for pool, bowling, darts and golf).
- 3 extra costumes for Kazuma, Haruka and Rikiya (completed game save file required to access content).

This pre-order only extra DLC are also available for the Japanese version, for which they were delivered for free through an eight-week downloadable content campaign. This DLC can be downloaded on the PlayStation Network. This was also released with pre-order in the UK.

== Marketing and release ==
=== Tie-in and product placement ===
General director Toshihiro Nagoshi made twenty-seven tie-in with local companies to produce 3D model reproductions of existing shop, restaurant or hostess bar buildings. Such replicas include real exterior, interior, products, menus and sometimes jingles.

Kabukicho's tie-in are Club Sega game centers, Don Quijote discount stores, Matsuya restaurants, Pronto cafés (a Suntory joint venture) and Karaoke Kan. Collaboration with Sole tanning studio, Promise, Aeon and Geos is limited to visible ads within Kamurocho.

Okinawa's tie-ins are Blue Seal ice cream parlor, Quickly bubble tea stand, Sam's Maui steak house, Stone Market accessory shop, Okinawaya (おきなわ屋), Okinawarigura (泡盛蔵) liquor store and Velotaxi Japan. Limited collaborations include the exterior design of Naha's Apa Hotel, Okinawa's Mitsukoshi and OPA department stores (which cannot be entered). Orion draft beer, Tantakatan (鍛高譚) shōchū, Higashuzou (比嘉酒造) awamori and Skymark Airlines have ads visible within the Downtown Ryukyu area.

Sega extended its product placement policy which was introduced in the original episode. Now real products can be bought within discount and convenience stores including Axe fragrance, various Ace Cook instant noodles, several Suntory beers or soft drinks (such as Boss Coffee and C.C. Lemon), Pepsi soda (a Suntory licensee), Kodansha magazines (including Young Magazine, Weekly Morning and Vivi). This also applies to bars and pubs, since the Suntory group produces alcohol and owns many licenses for foreign alcoholic beverages like Early Times whiskey, Beefeater Gin, Courvoisier cognac and Carlsberg Beer. Suntory vending machines are still disseminated within Kamurocho as in the previous games.

Some sub-scenarios even revolve around product placement with minor characters specially created to advertise products, for example, the side story involving Ace Cook noodles and the fictitious ramen shop Kyushu No. 1 Star (九州一番星, Kyūshū Ichibanboshi) or Young Magazine and the generic convenience store Poppo. Some items on the food and drink menu, required for 100% completion, cannot be purchased without first being in possession of a copy of Tokyo Isshukan.

=== Versions ===
==== Eastern releases ====
===== Kamutai Magazine bundle =====
As part of the pre-ordering campaign, the Japanese and Asian first prints were bundled with a limited item, a monography called Kamutai Magazine (February 2009 issue).

===== Rising Dragon Pack =====
Sony celebrated the Japanese release of the game with a 10,000 console limited edition of the Ceramic White 80GB model PlayStation 3 called the "Ryū ga Gotoku 3 Rising Dragon Pack" (龍が如く3昇り龍パック, Ryū ga Gotoku 3 Nobori Ryū Pakku).

===== Ukiyo's Bell =====
The eastern versions include an exclusive extra Adventure Mode item. If the game detects an existing save file of Ryū ga Gotoku Kenzan! stored on the PlayStation 3 hard disk drive, a reward item will be unlocked in Ryū ga Gotoku 3 upon beginning a new game. This is a red copper bell called "Ukiyo's Bell" (浮世の鈴, Ukiyo no Suzu) used by Miyamoto Musashi (a.k.a. Kazumanosuke Kiryu) in the spin-off, which grants 3 points in the defense, edge and firearm stats when equipped. The bell was carried on to Yakuza 4, and retains its appearance, but is renamed Gion's Bell, and instead of protecting the wearer, it rewards money for every step taken.

==== Western releases ====
===== Localization =====
The western version features the Japanese voice cast (with localized subtitles) and includes a previously unreleased 18-minute video interview of Tamiya according to the BBFC.

Other bonus contents include a free compact disc with the game's original soundtrack and an animated character guide. Western packages also come with PlayStation Network redeem codes to unlock DLC; these western bundles are called Challenge Pack (time limited) and Battle Pack (regular).

Although the game was not censored for the western release, much extra content was removed due to time constraints. According to a Sega representative:

"The content between Yakuza 3 US/UK and Yakuza JP is a little different in that we took out certain bits in order to bring the game to the west in the time alloted [sic] for us to do so. The parts we ended up taking out were parts that we felt wouldn't make sense (like a Japanese history quiz game) or wouldn't resonate as much (such as the concept of a hostess club). We didn't replace the parts we took out, but we made absolutely sure that the story continuity stayed intact so that the story experience was the same as the Japanese version and that it didn't take away the human drama so inherent to the Yakuza series."

The western localization of Yakuza 3 was officially unveiled by Sony and Sega in late December 2009. The same month, Sega Australia managing director Darren Macbeth declared in an interview with GameSpot:

"The publisher needs to be comfortable enough that there is a strong market in the West before giving the go-ahead to local Japanese releases like the Yakuza series. In a lot of cases we have a very strong vocal group of fans, who demand the opportunity to play these games in their local markets, and are very outspoken in their support. However, when the time comes, they are reluctant to stay committed and actually make the purchase."

===== Removed content =====
On February 24, 2010, a Sega America Blog community manager officially declared:

"We wanted to confirm that there is some content in the Japanese version of Yakuza 3 that didn't make it over to upcoming Western version, mostly involving the Hostess Clubs and the Japanese History trivia sections. [...] The choice that had to be made was either no Yakuza 3 in the west, or a version of the game that was almost exactly the same, but with a little less trivia."

This statement was an answer to IGN journalist Greg Miller's unofficial insight report of February 23 claiming:

"Even though the hostess clubs are out, you can still go on dates with the girls.[...] The strip clubs are still in Yakuza 3."

The referred strip clubs are "Show Pub Asia: Kamurocho Asia Beauty Show Dance and Pole" and Ryukyu's "Canal Grande: Cabaret Club", both are linked to main and side stories in the original Japanese release and therefore were not removed as confirmed by a new game trailer. A video showing the game's locations and was officially released by Sega on February 25. A Sega PR further commented to Kotaku blog on February 24, 2010:

"We had a tight schedule to abide by for localizing and releasing Yakuza 3 in the west. Due to the limited time we were given we had to leave certain bits of the game out and we chose portions we felt didn't resonate with western culture i.e. a Japanese history quiz show and the concept of hostess clubs. [...] Given the options of releasing the next chapter of a beloved game so that our fans can experience the story of Yakuza vs. not releasing it at all, we felt it was worth it to release it with 99% of the content intact. We made sure that the story in no way, shape or form changed from the lack of the quiz show or hostess clubs. You can still go into Cabarets and on dates with the ladies in the game."

Sega gave no further details about what was cut, but comparing the eastern and western releases PSN Trophy lists revealed that five trophies (out of 50) had been removed, two sub-scenario missions (out of 103) were cut as well half-aspect of romancing the club hostesses (out of 10 completion challenges) and four minigames (out of 20). The remaining 45 trophies are the same as in the original Japanese 2009 release, except two Bronze trophies, named "Legendary Champion" and "Key Collector", were upranked as Silver trophies. Removal of a first trophy called "Good Coordination" (グッドコーディネート, Guddo Kōdinēto) hinted that the sidestory called Creating a No.1 Hostess! (No.1キャバ嬢をつくろう！, No.1 Kyabajō) was cut. This mission consists of scouting a young female NPC in the Downtown Ryukyu (Shoko, Hiromi, Shō and Kirie) or Kamurocho (Ritsuko) areas, and to make her the top hostess at cabaret club South Island, by customizing her physical aspects (with variable parameters such as make-up, haircut, outfit and à la mode accessories). A similar club management mission was introduced in Yakuza 2, in which the club, rather than the girls, is customized. Club or "cabaret" hostesses are a common phenomenon in Japan and have dedicated fashion magazines; such as Koakuma Ageha which is a tie-in with the game. This mission reappeared in Ryū ga Gotoku 4.

Removal of a second trophy, "Futoppara" (太っ腹, "Generous"), hinted that the ten-episode hostess clubs completion challenge キャバクラ (Kyabakura, "cabaret club") had been partially cut, since the trophy is unlocked by spending a large amount of money in Club Ageha, Club Koakuma and Flawless. In this multipart completion, which is a romancing challenge, Kazuma Kiryu orders food and drink while conversing with the ten hostesses. All characters are modeled after a real Japanese hostesses cast and this gameplay element was introduced in the original Yakuza episode. The possibility of romancing club hostess characters outside clubs in the western releases of Yakuza 3, as officially announced by the Sega representatives, was eventually confirmed by the presence of Mika Tsuchiya of Flawless playing the pool minigame on the game's back cover. This possibility is inherited from the Japanese version since the romancing completion challenge actually includes both hostess club dialogues (ordering meals and offering presents) and dating activities such as dual sessions of pool, darts, bowling and karaoke. If the former text part was cut, the latter dating part, which requires a minor translation work, definitely remain in the western releases. While the hostesses remained, the trophy was still removed since it was impossible to spend money on them within the club setting.

The third trophy to be removed was "Esthe mania" (エステ・マニア, Esute Mania) which requires the player to take the Love In Heart massage parlor's two courses. This erotic minigame was cut along with its connected sidestory, "...About Me?" ((俺のこと？, Ore no Koto?) where the masseuse, Ayaka Tsubaki, comes out to Kiryu as trans. This minor character is modeled after her voice actor, Ayana Tsubaki, who is a Japanese TV personality and trans herself.

The fourth and fifth cut trophies, "Fudō no Kishi" (不動の棋士, "Immovable Shogi Player") and "Sarashi no Ryū" (晒しの龍, "Bleaching Dragon") respectively were the first sign that both shogi and mahjong minigames had been removed from the western releases. These are based on traditional board games that are fairly popular in Japan, yet uncommon overseas.

Another confirmed cut was Kamurocho Club Sega's Answer & Answer, a Japanese history quiz minigame based on the real Sega arcade game, which is only available in Japanese game centers. The last cut was an Adventure Mode unlockable bonus item, Ukiyo's Bell, which is awarded to players of the eastern-only PlayStation 3 spinoff Ryū ga Gotoku Kenzan! and, as such, would be both impractical and impossible for the majority of players.

===== Challenge Pack =====
According to a community manager's official announcement on the Sega America blog:

"Yakuza fans who pre-order the game at their local GameStop will receive additional content via the Challenge Pack. This will allow them to enjoy 2 player mini games, competing against their friends at Pool, Bowling, Darts and Golf. They will also be able to customize their principal characters with four alternative costumes for Kazuma, Haruka and Rikiya."

===== Battle Pack =====
The PAL version was released as a standard deluxe edition called Battle Pack (or Premium Pack). The package's sticker lists the following free contents:

"Bonus enhanced CD soundtrack with a guide to Who's Who in the world of Yakuza + 4 pieces of unlockable content."

As an ECD, this CD contains both audio and interactive features. The audio part is the full OST featuring the 31 tracks licensed by JASRAC; it was previously sold by Sega's audio branch in the Japanese market and is now offered to western customers. The data part contains a fully animated characters guide called Yakuza Who's Who; like the OST these profiles are exclusive to the western releases.

==== Licensed movie version ====
North American video distributor Tokyo Shock (Media Blasters) set the release date and cover art of its licensed DVD version for Like a Dragon in order to match the local marketing for Yakuza 3. The English subtitled version for Takashi Miike's 2007 live-action film adaptation of the first Yakuza game was originally planned for a March 2010 release date; the release schedule was eventually changed to February 23, 2010.

== Release ==
A free demo version was released on the Japanese PlayStation Store on February 19, 2009. The same demo was released on the European PlayStation Store on February 18, 2010.

Due to their commercial success all Asian versions had bargain re-releases, a PlayStation 3 the Best edition in Asia on November 30, 2009, then in Japan on December 3, 2009 and a PlayStation 3 BigHit Series edition on December 11, 2009, in Korea.

== Reception ==
Reception

Aggregate scores
Aggregator	Score
Metacritic	PS3: 79/100; PS4: 77/100
OpenCritic	64% recommend(Remaster) (Note: Based on 14 reviews)

Review scores
Publication	Score
1Up.com	A−
Computer and Video Games	9/10
Eurogamer	8/10
Famitsu	38/40
G4	4/5
GamePro	4.5/5
GameRevolution	A−
GamesMaster	90%
GameSpot	8/10
GameTrailers	8/10
IGN	8.5/10
PlayStation Official Magazine – UK	9/10
PALGN	8/10
Play	80%
PSM3	90%
VideoGamer.com	9/10
Dengeki PlayStation	37.5/40
The Daily Telegraph	9/10
Thunderbolt	9/10

Awards
Publication	Award
	2009 Japan Game Awards: Award for excellence (Games of the Year Division)
	2009 SCEJ PlayStation Awards: Gold Prize

The Japanese industry gave it the "Award for excellence" in the Japan Game Awards 2009's "Games of the Year Division" for its "Dramatic story development, freedom of the story, the graphics elaborated up to the details of the work, and the amusement found in every portion of the game including the vast number of sub-stories and mini games. This work was awarded the prize for providing a high quality of entertainment." Yakuza 3 also earned Sony Computer Entertainment's PlayStation Award 2009 Gold prize for achieving more than 500,000 sales in the Japanese market. Other Gold Prizes awarded that year included Resident Evil 5 (PS3) and Dissidia Final Fantasy (PSP). It was also well received in the west, with the UK's Official PlayStation Magazine awarding it 9/10; however, it was criticized for the removal of content during localization, which included several sub-stories.

Yakuza 3 is ranked as the second best selling 2009 PlayStation 3 game in Japan, following Square-Enix's Final Fantasy XIII, but outselling Capcom's Resident Evil 5, and is part of 2009's best-selling titles in this market with 499,436 copies sold as of December 7, 2009 according to Weekly Famitsu. By March 27, 2010, Yakuza 3 had sold more than 683,905 copies.

== Sequel and remake ==
Yakuza 4 was released in Japan in March 2010, and was released in North America and Europe at the first quarter of 2011. A spin-off game, Yakuza: Dead Souls, was originally scheduled for release in Japan in March 2011; however, due to the 2011 Tōhoku earthquake, the game was delayed until June 2011.

A remake of Yakuza 3, titled Yakuza Kiwami 3 & Dark Ties, was released on February 12, 2026, with the addition of a spin-off story starring Yoshitaka Mine, taking place before the events of Yakuza 3.
