= Yakuza (video game) =

2005 video game

- North American cover art
- Developer: New Entertainment R&D Dept. (Note: HD Edition developed by Ryu Ga Gotoku Studio.)
- Publisher: Sega
- Director: Ryuta Ueda
- Producers: Masayoshi Kikuchi; Toshihiro Nagoshi
- Designer: Takeshi Tanaka
- Programmers: Kazuhisa Hasuoka; Tetsuya Kaku
- Artist: Daisuke Sato
- Writers: Masayoshi Yokoyama; Hase Seishū
- Composer: Hidenori Shoji
- Series: Yakuza
- Platforms: PlayStation 2; PlayStation 3; Wii U
- Release: PlayStation 2: JP: December 8, 2005; NA: September 5, 2006; AU: September 14, 2006; EU: September 15, 2006; PlayStation 3: JP: November 1, 2012; Wii U: JP: August 8, 2013
- Genres: Action-adventure, beat 'em up
- Mode: Single-player

Yakuza (Note: Japanese: 龍が如く, Hepburn: Ryū ga Gotoku; lit. "Like a Dragon") is a 2005 action-adventure game developed and published by Sega for the PlayStation 2. It was released in December 2005 in Japan and in September 2006 internationally. The story follows Kazuma Kiryu, a yakuza who spent ten years in prison for a crime he did not commit. After being released, he learns that the criminal underworld is searching for 10 billion yen that has been stolen from the Tojo clan. The game takes place in Kamurochō, a realistic recreation of Tokyo's Kabukichō district.

Yakuza takes place in an open world and makes use of role-playing elements. The player gains experience from combat which is used to improve Kiryu's fighting capabilities. In order to finance the game's expensive production, Sega contracted a tie-in campaign with famous Japanese companies. A sequel, Yakuza 2 was released in Japan in 2006. The game, along with its sequel, received an HD remaster, released in Japan in 2012. A remake titled Yakuza Kiwami was released for PlayStation 3 and PlayStation 4 in 2016, and later ported to Windows, Xbox One, Nintendo Switch, and Nintendo Switch 2.

Critical reception was generally positive; its presentation and story were praised while its controls and mechanics were criticized. Yakuza was a commercial success and sold over one million units on PS2. Its success led to an ongoing franchise, now renamed Like a Dragon internationally.

== Gameplay ==
Gameplay of Yakuza. The top-left bars show Kiryu's health and energy while the bottom-right one shows the enemy's health. The bottom left displays a map.

Yakuza is a third-person open world action-adventure game where the player controls Kazuma Kiryu in the Tokyo district of Kamurochō. The game also utilises fixed camera system and incorporates role-playing elements. With the experience gained from combat, the player can level up Kiryu's attributes and increase his fighting capabilities in order to perform Heat actions which greatly damage his enemies. Yakuza utilizes quick time events during the fights.

While Kamurocho's map shows the linear path to continue the main story, the player may take on missions and side quests found around the city. The game is composed of three interconnected modes called Event, Adventure and Battle. In Encounter Battles, the player randomly encounters foes. Winning these battle nets some cash, which can be used to purchase equipment or healing items. Items can be bought in shops based on real life stores and are divided into multiple real companies.

The Battle Mode includes the Underground Arena which is located in Kamurocho's Purgatory area. Cutscenes are enabled after completing specific actions or beating a certain character during the Adventure Mode. They also introduce the chapter's objectives. Various minigames are available within 'Adventure Mode' in the form of arcade machines scattered throughout the game world. These include a claw crane, a batting cage, a casino (Baccarat (card game), blackjack and roulette), toba, and pachislot.

== Plot ==
The game follows the story of Kazuma Kiryu (Darryl Kurylo/Takaya Kuroda), a yakuza whose life changes when his boss, Sohei Dojima, attempts to rape Kiryu's childhood friend, Yumi Sawamura (Eliza Dushku/Miyako Uesaka). When Dojima is murdered by Kiryu's best friend and fellow yakuza, Akira Nishikiyama (Michael Rosenbaum/Kazuhiro Nakaya), Kiryu accepts blame for the murder, and is imprisoned for ten years. During his incarceration, Kiryu is expelled from his organization, the Tojo Clan, and Yumi goes missing. After his release, he learns that ten billion yen has been stolen from the Tojo Clan's private bank, and that the entire Japanese underworld is now searching for the lost wealth.

Kiryu asks his former captain and adopted father, Shintaro Kazama (Roger L. Jackson/Tetsuya Watari), about Yumi's disappearance, but Nishikiyama, who now controls his own gang, shoots Kazama after he reveals that Yumi was connected to the lost money. Kiryu manages to escape from the Tojo, who now regard him as an enemy and put a contract out on his life. His escape is aided by a detective named Makoto Date (Bill Farmer/Kazuhiro Yamaji), who had been investigating Kiryu ever since the death of Dojima, and is now investigating the murder of Third Chairman Masaru Sera (Alan Dale/Ryuji Mizuki), the former Tojo Clan leader whose death has triggered a war between Kazama, Nishikiyama, and an ambitious yakuza boss, Futoshi Shimano (Michael Madsen/Naomi Kusumi).

In his search for Yumi, Kiryu finds an orphan named Haruka Sawamura (Debi Derryberry/Rie Kugimiya) who is searching for her mother, Mizuki, who Date identifies as Yumi's younger sister. Haruka is also targeted by the yakuza, who believe that her pendant, which Yumi gave to her for safekeeping, is the key to the missing ten billion. Kazuma is forced to protect her from not just Shimano and Nishikiyama, but also Goro Majima (Mark Hamill/Hidenari Ugaki), Shimano's sadomasochistic lieutenant, as well as the Omi Alliance, a rival yakuza organization, the Snake Flower Triad, led by Kiryu's old enemy Lau Ka Long (James Horan/Shinichi Takizawa), and the MIA, a mysterious group with ties to the Japanese government.

Eventually, Kiryu learns from Kazama that Haruka is actually Yumi's daughter, and that "Mizuki" is Yumi under an assumed identity. Yumi suffered amnesia after she was attacked by Dojima, but recovered and married Kyohei Jingu (Robin Atkin Downes/Hiroaki Yoshida), an ambitious politician who allied himself with Sera. After accidentally killing a journalist who had tried to blackmail him with evidence that he committed adultery, Jingu asked Sera to have Yumi and Haruka murdered. Kazama saved the pair and persuaded Sera to turn on Jingu, having learned that the latter was using the clan to launder ten billion yen for his own purposes. It is then revealed that Kazama, Yumi and Sera robbed the ten billion yen so that Jingu would not use it to bribe the clan. Shimano ambushes them but Kiryu defeats him; however, Shimano mortally wounds Kazama with a grenade and his ally, Omi Alliance lieutenant Yukio Terada (Gregg Berger/Kenji Nomura), then shoots him dead in revenge. Before dying, Kazama confesses to Kiryu that he killed his parents when he was young and that he in fact operated the Sunflower Orphanage Kiryu grew up in.

Armed with the knowledge of the money's location, Kiryu and Haruka head to Millennium Tower, where they meet Yumi, who has recovered her memories and now intends to destroy the money with a bomb. Jingu arrives with the MIA and the Omi Alliance, revealing his newfound interest in bribing the Omi Alliance instead of the Tojo Clan. Kiryu subdues him and his men, but Nishikiyama, revealed to be cooperating with Jingu after the latter bribed him, arrives to challenge Kiryu and take the money for himself, but Kiryu defeats him. Jingu appears and shoots Yumi before a remorseful Nishikiyama stabs him and detonates the bomb by shooting at it, killing them both and destroying the entire floor in the process. Yumi then dies in Kiryu's arms, and with her, Nishiki and Kazama now dead, Kiryu decides to return to prison, but Date talks him out of it by reminding him that he is the only one who can take care of Haruka now. The Tojo Clan asks Kiryu to assume the role of Fourth Chairman in accordance with Sera's will, to which Kiryu complies but he retires instead mere hours later and names Terada as the new Chairman to rebuild the clan. The story ends with Kiryu beginning a new life as a civilian with Haruka as his newly-adopted daughter.

== Development ==
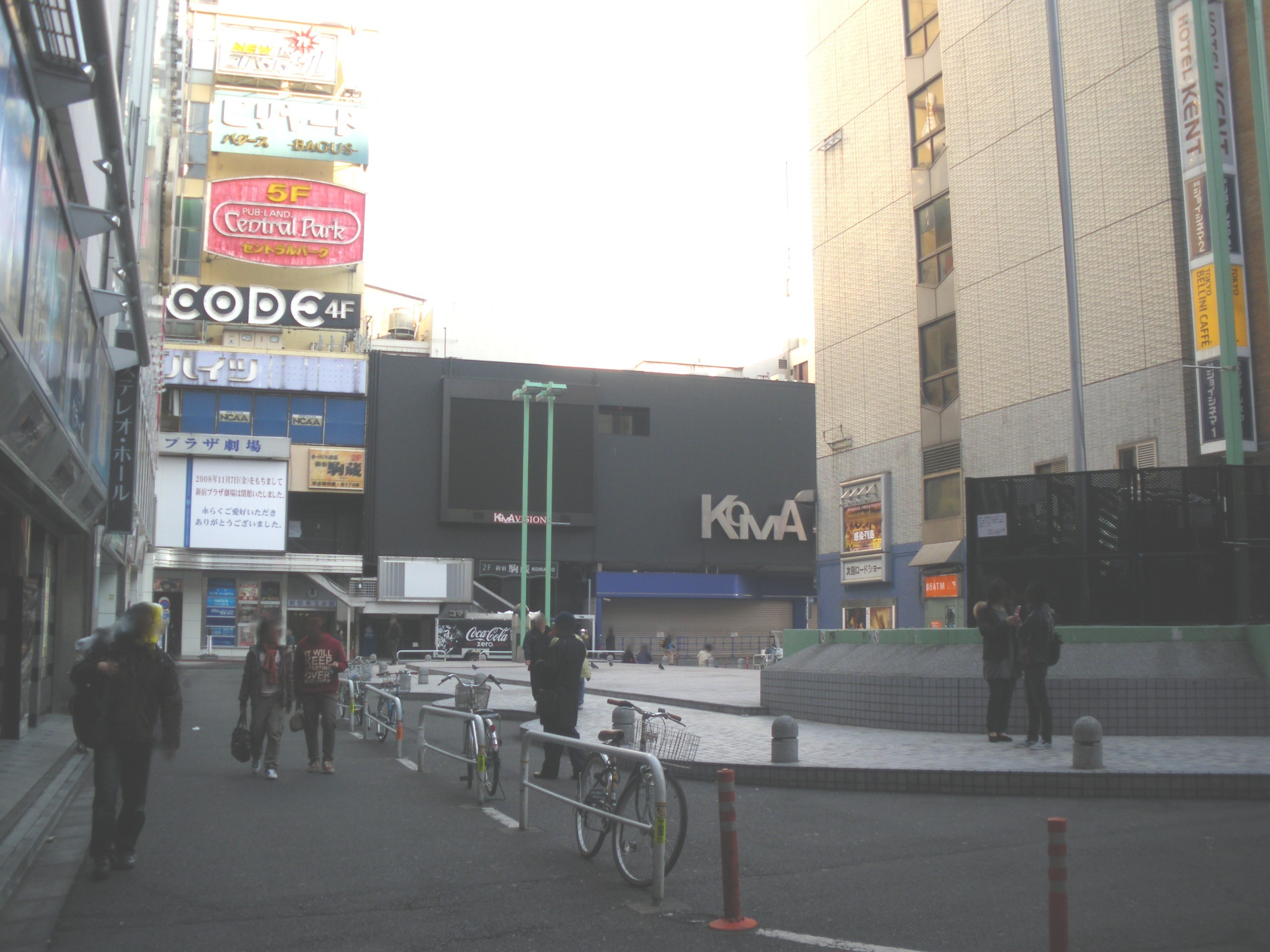
The Shinjuku Koma Theater is the model for the Kamuro Theater, which is a main landmark in the game. TV ads are displayed in-game and can be viewed in full screen.

The game was first hinted at in August 2005 as "Project J." Later that month, details were announced. Producer Toshihiro Nagoshi explained "For a while now, I've wanted to create a powerful, gritty drama where you feel the sense of humanity," Nagoshi explained. "After a lot of thought, this is the product that we've arrived at." Sega General Manager at the time, Hideki Okamura, revealed that as of August 23, 2005, the game had been in development for three years. The budget of the game was 2.4 billion yen (approx. $21 million).

Most of the team members are from different backgrounds, such as developers that have their roots in the arcade with titles such as Virtua Fighter 3 and Super Monkey Ball, as well as team members having experience in novel console titles like Panzer Dragoon and Jet Set Radio. The team members all felt that they went against their careers considering that the new game didn't match anything they had previously done. Nagoshi felt that this was an advantage, making them all play on even playing field. Anything that was done had to go through Nagoshi first, since only he had a concrete idea of how the game is going to end up.

During development, the team researched hostess clubs, which are prominently featured in the story, even attending hostess clubs themselves, including Roppongi and Kabukicho. The fictional setting of Kamurocho in the game was closely based on the red-light district of Kabukicho in Tokyo. The development team wanted to accurately portray yakuza, especially such as their obsession with jingi, their code of honor. Originally, the game had scenes where pinky fingers were cut off, a traditional punishment, but these scenes were removed so that CERO would give Yakuza a favorable rating. Though using the gameplay schematics of one of Nagoshi's earlier titles, SpikeOut, as basis for the combat, Yakuza utilized an entirely new engine crafted for the game. Some of the software used to help develop the game were Autodesk Softimage.

=== Writing ===
The game's development team was divided into two groups: one writing the main plot and the other writing the subplots. Novelist Hase Seishu was an editor of the central plot. Seishu was brought on board two years before the game development started. Seishu had been a gamer since the days of Space Invaders, but over the past four or five years, he had lost interest, as he was less concerned with 3D visuals and gameplay than he was with story. Yakuza caught his attention, and he decided to accept the project even though it came at the busiest point of his professional writing career. Nagoshi wanted players to get enjoyment from merely walking through Kamurocho. Nagoshi reveals that the game's title, which translates to Like a Dragon, was his creation; Nagoshi felt that dragons have a strong image, which would evoke Kazuma's strength and manliness.

Although Sega did have a plot in mind when they approached Seishu, they hoped that he could add realism and emotional weight to the scenes. Under Seishu's direction, the ages of Makoto Date and Kazuma Kiryu were modified. Writing the subplots did not prove challenging, as there was not a strict pattern to follow. The team wanted all subplots to keep the feeling from the main storyline. Several ideas did not make it into the game because the staff members found them silly. One subplot that made the final cut, which involves a man who tried to commit suicide when he was rejected by a girl, was nearly removed from this game for this reason.

=== Localization ===
In localizing the game, Sega funded an aggressive web and print advertising campaign, as well as an English voice cast composed almost entirely of cult performers like Michael Madsen, Eliza Dushku and Mark Hamill. Localization producer Kevin Frane recalls "When we released the original Yakuza, we knew that the game had been a hit in Japan, and we wanted to make sure that we put our best foot forward in releasing a new and unique product to the Western market that would draw just as much acclaim." However, technical limitations of the format made it impossible for the team to include both audio tracks on the disc. Scott A. Steinberg at Sega of America commented "in bringing the game to the U.S. market, we wanted to ensure that the subtle nuances of the game were brought to life." English voice actor Darryl Kurylo said that he wanted to sound as good as possible after being impressed by the characterization of Kiryu and the lines he had to give. However, he regrets some lines were lost in translation of the original game. Nevertheless, Kurylo enjoyed the experience to the point of playing the game multiple times alongside his son. In order to fit the lipsyncing from the original Japanese game, Kurylo often had to say a line in different styles. Kurylo still found more fun when doing the yells for the fight scenes.

There were also problems with promoting Yakuza before its English release. Frane added that the first trailer for the game "was constructed using an old scratch track [an unfinished soundtrack]. This made the rounds fairly quickly across gaming fan sites, highlighting what was considered poor quality, but this trailer actually wasn't at all representative of the voice quality of the finished product. The damage had already been done, though, for the most part, and so a lot of fans probably still don't realize that."

=== Soundtrack ===
The Ryū ga Gotoku & Ryū ga Gotoku 2 Original Sound Track (HCV-287) dual-disc boxset was published by Wave Master in Japan on January 25, 2007. The music was composed by Hidenori Shoji, Sachio Ogawa, Keitaro Hanada, Fumio Ito, Yuri Fukuda. The closing theme is John Newton's rendition of Amazing Grace, a classic hymn sung in English by Eri Kawai; additional performers are Makotch (vocals), Yuri (chorus) and Tomica (chorus).

== Marketing ==
In order to both support the game's expensive production, including making Kamurocho a realistic recreation of Tokyo's Kabukicho, Sega contracted a tie-in campaign with famous Japanese companies. As a result, some in-game locations, such as the Don Quijote discount store and the Club Sega game centers are modeled after the real life buildings.

Sega also used product placement, and introduced ads within the game. This includes a collaboration with the Japanese Suntory group which advertises in-game with ad banners, Boss Coffee ads and vending machines are also visible in Kamurocho; cans are purchasable within Kamurocho stores. Since the group produces local drinks and is a distributor of foreign alcohols, all brands appearing in Kamurocho's bars and pubs, being Whiskey, Jack Daniel's Bourbon or Carlsberg Beer, are real brands of Suntory. In promoting the game, Sega hired Takashi Miike. A member from the team had previously worked with Toei Company on V-cinema. Sega approached many companies to try to secure product placement, like car companies and fashion companies. But because of the mature nature of the Yakuza game, they were rejected by most of them. The whiskey distributor Suntory accepted, however, since they felt the game's demographic meshed nicely with the whiskey-drinking demographic.

Other product placements include Shogakukan's Sabra magazine, Fujisankei Communications Group's SPA! magazine and Panini Group's FIFA Club World Cup stickers. The latter appears in a TV ad, together with a Suntory drink and a Sega mahjong game, which is displayed in the Kamurocho theater wall screen. Sega's UFO Catcher crane game machines are included as a minigame, and arcade cabinets of Virtua Fighter 4 and SpikeOut can be seen in the Club Sega game centers.

=== Editions ===
As part of the pre-ordering campaign, the Japanese first edition was bundled with two limited items, a Tojo Clan lapel pin replica (特製ピンバッジ, tokusei pin bajji, lit. "deluxe pin badge") and a monography called Kamutai Magazine (December 2005 issue). The original PlayStation 2 the Best edition (SLPM-74234) included a bonus DVD with the trailer of Yakuza 2, while the reprint (SLPM-74253) which was released during the production of the spin-off was repackaged with a rose cover art instead of white (a.k.a. リパッケージ版, ripakkeji han lit. "repackage edition") and a bonus DVD with the trailer of Ryu Ga Gotoku Kenzan!, a voice cast message and a 20-minute producer interview.

There were no special editions of the game released outside Japan, but Sega Europe and America did use online marketing. A flash game, CodeYakuza.com, was created, and an English subtitled version of the game's 2006 live-action adaption directed by Takashi Miike, Like a Dragon: Prologue, was freely downloadable on the game's official website.

On November 1, 2012, a PlayStation 3 HD remaster of the Japanese original version of Yakuza and Yakuza 2 titled Ryū ga Gotoku 1&2 HD EDITION (Japanese: 龍が如く 1&2 HD EDITION; lit. "Like a Dragon 1&2 HD EDITION") was released in Japan. This "HD edition" features both game remasters bundled in a single Blu-ray disc and later as a downloadable title on the Japanese PlayStation Store.

On December 11, 2014, this "HD edition" was re-released in the budget range "PlayStation 3 the Best" dedicated to best sellers on the Japanese domestic market. Simultaneously to this Blu-ray re-release, an 18.1GB downloadable version was also made available for purchase on the Japanese PlayStation Store. The HD edition was later released for Wii U on August 8, 2013 in Japan. This Wii U release is notable for being the first port of the PlayStation-exclusive Yakuza series on a non-Sony platform.

== Reception ==
Reception

Aggregate score
| Aggregator | Score |
|---|---|
| Metacritic | 75/100 |

Review scores
| Publication | Score |
|---|---|
| 1Up.com | A− |
| Eurogamer | 8/10 |
| Famitsu | 37/40 |
| GamePro | 4.5/5 |
| GameRevolution | C− |
| GameSpot | 7.4/10 |
| GameTrailers | 8/10 |
| GameZone | 8.5/10 |
| IGN | 8.2/10 |
| UGO | A− |

Awards
| Publication | Award |
|---|---|
| Japan Game Awards | Award for Excellence |
| Famitsu Awards | Excellence Award |

The game was heavily acclaimed in Japan for combining innovative gameplay with cinema-like story telling and character development on the back of Japan's criminal underground. Yakuza received generally positive reviews among Western critics earning a 75 out of 100 in Metacritic. IGN praised its combat system and sense of style but criticized its tedious gameplay. Newtype USA called it "the adult-themed spiritual successor to the Dreamcast's Shenmue series" and found that the fighting system would interest many players. GamePro similarly compared it with Shenmue based on the amount of subscenarios. 1UP.com saw the potential of the fighting as it often earned the player money which can be used to buy items in the city. GameRevolution criticized the number of random encounters which resulted in a large amount of loading times. He also criticized the simplicity of the fighting system and few notable issues with GameTrailers agreeing on the difficulty in centering on an enemy. The amount of sidequests available received generally favorable response.

The game has been praised for the design of the city. 1Up.com wrote it was an "incredibly realistic and accurate portrayal of Tokyo's Kabuki-cho district", while IGN thought "the city actually feels alive". However, GameRevolution complained there is not much not to do in the streets "besides look for people who want to talk to you and begin missions". Delivery of the English voice acting was also praised. GameRevolution also praised it: "From an audio/video standpoint, Yakuza is exceptionally well-produced. Although the cut-scenes are [sic] all use the in-game engine, the complicated facial expressions are shockingly intricate and colorful, while some of the floral tattoos look too good to be true." UGO Networks praised the seriousness of the story as the game "respects and appreciates yakuza culture and its often forgotten roots in the samurai tradition/bushido code" and thus lamented the lack of the Japanese audio. GameTrailers also wished for a Japanese audio option, despite noting the English dub did a fine job. GameZone called it an "epic story that will keep you exploring the world filled with criminals and Kazuma's only friends who will help him along the way." Eurogamer also commented on the narrative praising the contrast between Kiryu's kindness and Nishikiyama's brooding.

=== Sales ===
The game sold 232,650 units in Japan during 2005. In 2006, it shipped 345,323 units. Due to its commercial success on the Japanese market, Yakuza had a PlayStation 2 The Best edition on October 26, 2006, and an exceptional reprint on December 6, 2007. In contrast, this Asian long seller title never had a Platinum or Greatest Hits re-release on the Western markets. The PS2 version had sold over 1 million copies.

=== Legacy ===
According to Toshihiro Nagoshi: "[Ryu ga Gotoku was successful] because there were only a few titles which directly portray original Japanese culture. Also, there is no other title which attempts to represent such a Japanese world view with a big budget title." The game was also recognized for excellence in the 2007 Japan Game Awards.

A sequel, titled Yakuza 2, was released in Japan on December 7, 2006, Sega promising an improved fighting system and further exploration. Nagoshi commented on some of his goals with Yakuza 2 being providing a deeper dramatic storyline over what was found in the original, the game also has some themes that were not in the original, including an adult love story.

A remake of Yakuza, titled Yakuza: Kiwami, was released on January 21, 2016 in Japan for PlayStation 3 and PlayStation 4. Kiwami improved the resolution, framerate, textures and loading times compared to the original game, and additional content was added to resolve some of the more confusing plot points and establish connections to the prequel title Yakuza 0.

Yakuza was the first and (until the release of Judgment) only game in the series to feature an English dub. The original game's localization and English dub, and the lack of Japanese audio as an option, has been retrospectively highlighted by critics as a perceived flaw of the game's original Western release. In particular, the dub has been criticized for the perceived poor quality of its voice acting, and the excessive use of profanity in its script, which was seen by some as an inappropriate attempt to appeal to the Western market. An unofficial undub patch, which also revised the game's English script, was created by a fan as a result of the English dub's poor reception.

== Live-action adaptations ==
In 2006, Takeshi Miyasaka directed a prequel titled Like a Dragon: Prologue (龍が如く 〜序章〜, ryu ga gotoku -joshou-) with mixed martial artist and puroresu wrestler Masakatsu Funaki as Kazuma Kiryu. A film adaptation titled Like a Dragon (龍が如く 劇場版, ryu ga gotoku: gekijoban) was directed by Takashi Miike in 2007. Kazuma Kiryu's role is played by actor Kazuki Kitamura, known outside of Japan for his roles in Shohei Imamura's The Eel, Takashi Miike's Dead or Alive and Quentin Tarantino's Kill Bill.

In September 2020, it was reported that Sega was developing a live-action adaptation for the video game with 1212 Entertainment and Wild Sheep Content. Erik Barmack, Roberto Grande and Joshua Long are set to produce. The series, which stars Ryoma Takeuchi in the lead role of Kazuma Kiryu, premiered in October 2024 on Amazon Prime Video.
