= Rent a Hero =

1991 video game

- Developer: Sega AM2
- Publisher: Sega
- Producer: Yu Suzuki
- Designer: Keiji Okayasu
- Programmers: Keiji Okayasu; Katsunori Itai
- Artists: Kazuhiro Izaki; Mika Kojima
- Writer: Yukinobu Arikawa
- Composer: Hiroshi Kawaguchi
- Platform: Mega Drive
- Release: JP: September 20, 1991
- Genre: Action role-playing
- Mode: Single-player

Rent a Hero is an action role-playing video game series released by Sega for the Mega Drive console in 1991 with a large emphasis on humor. The game features the same graphic engine previously used in the development of Sword of Vermilion. However, Rent a Hero has an unusual innovation for the genre. Instead of using standard turn-based battles, fights are in a similar format to 2D fighting games.

== Plot ==
Taro Yamada, or "Rent a Hero" (レンタヒーロー, Renta Hīrō) lives in the town of Corja in Japan with his mother, eccentric father and younger sister Alyssa; the family moved there after his father changed jobs. He received his Combat Armor by accident during their house-warming party, when he ordered pizza from 'Sensational Cafeteria' or SECA and instead received the suit. After realizing the suit gave him incredible strength, and that he is required to pay for the armor, Taro decides to become a hero for hire, performing various heroic tasks and odd-jobs for the townspeople of Corja.

== Release ==
Rent a Hero was released for the Mega Drive on September 20, 1991, in Japan by Sega. It was later released on the Wii's Virtual Console download service on April 17, 2007.

== Remake ==
Rent a Hero No. 1
- Developer: Aspect
- Publishers: Dreamcast: JP: Sega; Xbox: JP: Sega; NA: AIA Games
- Director: Toshiaki Arai
- Producer: Noriko Ishimoto
- Designer: Tombo Arikawa
- Programmers: Miaki Makishima; Kazuhiro Kabira
- Composers: Hiroshi Kawaguchi; Kojiro Mikusa; Kayoko Matsushima
- Platforms: Dreamcast, Xbox
- Release: Dreamcast: JP: May 25, 2000; Xbox: JP: September 4, 2003; NA: Cancelled
- Genre: Action role-playing
- Mode: Single-player

Rent a Hero No. 1, a remake of the original Mega Drive game, was released for the Dreamcast in 2000. It features similar events to Rent a Hero, this time adding Rent a Hiroko, a female counterpart of Taro. The fighting engine used for the game is the same used for Sega's SpikeOut games and allows the player to receive hints via in-game email.

The game was enhanced and given online capabilities by Coolnet Entertainment for the Xbox in 2003, and also translated into English for a North American release in what would have been the first Rent a Hero overseas release. However, the English version of the game was never released due to distribution problems, and the Xbox version remained only in Japan as had previously happened with the original Dreamcast version.

In 2008, the unreleased English-translated version of the game was leaked and appeared on torrent sites in an apparently complete state, with only minor text errors present. This version was very close to completion and was reviewed by GamePro and Electronic Gaming Monthly in February 2003. An unofficial English patch was released in 2023.

=== Reception ===
Reception

Review scores
| Publication | Score |
|---|---|
| Famitsu | 30 / 40 |
| GameSpot | 8 / 10 |
| IGN | 8.4 / 10 |

On release, Famitsu scored the Dreamcast version of the game a 30 out of 40. IGN called it "a bordering-on-cheesy, yet outstanding action-RPG". They praised the 3D combat system, comparing it to SpikeOut and Shenmue, as well as "the meticulous attention to detail" in "around five large neighborhoods, each with plenty of houses, universities, and restaurants" as well as a video arcade with minigames. They also praised the animation and "brilliantly rendered graphics", concluding that "the gameplay is tightly focused, it looks great, and definitely has a soul".

GameSpot called it a "wacky" game that is "definitely unique and uniquely Sega". They praised the battle system, comparing it to Virtua Fighter and Dynamite Deka, as well as the "admirable" camera work, "rock-steady 60fps" and "fluid" character animation. They criticized the character models for not looking "as nice as" Soul Calibur or Shenmue, but praised the environments for having "a texture quality that rivals" Sonic Adventure, indoor and outdoor designs that "are nothing short of breathtaking" and "a large number of suburban homes" where "each house is unique". They concluded that it is "a humorous, irreverent joy to experience" and a "surprisingly excellent game."

== Other media ==
=== Video Games ===
Taro is available in Fighters Megamix as an unlockable character. He is one of few characters to use projectile attacks, and one of the strongest fighters. However, he has an additional handicap: above his life bar are battery symbols, that deplete the longer a fight lasts, if they deplete fully, Taro's armor will disappear. In this state, he will not be able to perform a number of moves, including all projectile moves, and he will also take more damage.

==== Spin-Off ====
On June 18, 2026, Rent a Hero Z was made by LINE NEXT under license from Sega. It was only available for gamers based in Australia, Canada, and India for Android and iOS phones.

The game was close in September 2026.

=== Film ===
On July 12, 2016, it was announced that Steve Pink will direct and co-write with Jeff Morris a film version of Rent-A-Hero. There has been no news on this since.

==== Stage play ====
The series itself was adapted into stage play titled Rent a Hero and was hosted in Japan's Rokkokai Hall in Tokyo from January 17 to 21, 2018; it was sponsored and produced by SPIRAL CHARIOTS. Seiji Hattori, who runs SPIRAL CHARIOTS, was in charge of the script and direction with supervision and special cooperation from Sega Games and Sega Holdings.

Stage version main cast:

- Rental Hero/Rentaman/Taro Turner: Ken Ogasawara
- Rent-A-Hero Darkness/Mac Albite: Ryutora Isogai
- Susie Stripe: Haruka Ohara
- Rent-A-Hero Rent-A-Hiroko/Piano Doremy: Hana Toshima
- Rental Hero Ursalaman/Ursalaman: Shota Minami
- Combu Dasijiru: Tatsumi Sheena
- Rent-A-Hero Blycarnman/Will Antony: Sho Toda
- Organo Doremy: Sayuri Yamato
- Travel Travolta: Texas
- Money pear: Misa Kurihara
- Mink: Minami Kashimura
- Tomato: Karen Misaki
- Hyena: Ryotaro Matsumura
- Gazelle: Takahiro Saito
- Alisa Turner: Rio Sudo
- Yoshiko Turner: Saeko Shono
- Inspector Zenikase: South American Jin
- Officer Ryogae: Tooru Hirayama
- Buster Alvide (President of Nomorwa Chemical): Shota Yamada
- Kent Albede: Mahiro Komatsuzaki
- Maitake Jackson: Chizu Hanasaki
- Mu: Kaori Natsuka (voice appearance)
- Lars (Chief of Dahane Police Station): Seiji Hattori

== See also ==
- Hero Bank
