= Cyberware (company) =

Cyberware Inc. was a company that produced high-performance color 3D scanners. Cyberware was owned and managed by the Addleman family with headquarters in Monterey, California; it has scanning centers located in United States, UK, Europe, Australia and Asia.

== 3D Color Scanners ==
A 3D scanner is a device that analyzes a real-world object to collect data on its shape and appearance.

=== Head & Face ===
- Model PS
- Model PX

=== Whole Body ===
- Model WB2
- Model WB4
- Model WBX

=== Custom ===
- Model BK (Below the Knee)
- Model LSS (Large Statue Scanner)
- Model M15 (Desktop 3D Scanner)
- Model S (Shop)
- Model SG (Spherical Gantry)
- Model 3030 (Scanhead)
- Model 7G (Ear Impression)

== Selected films ==
Cyberware won the Academy award for Best Visual Effects in the Hollywood movie The Abyss.

- 1986: Star Trek IV: The Voyage Home (William Shatner, Leonard Nimoy and the Enterprise crew)
- 1989: The Abyss (Pseudopod)
- 1990: RoboCop 2 (computerized talking face)
- 1991: Terminator 2: Judgment Day (Linda Hamilton, Robert Patrick, Arnold Schwarzenegger and Dan Stanton)
- 1991: The Doors (film) (Val Kilmer)
- 1992: Batman Returns (Michael Keaton)
- 1993: Jurassic Park (film) (dinosaur models)
- 1994: The Mask (film) (dog model)
- 1996: Dragonheart (winged dragon model)

== Selected video games ==
- 2004: Onimusha 3: Demon Siege (Takeshi Kaneshiro and Jean Reno)
- 2008: Ryū ga Gotoku Kenzan! (Takaya Kuroda, Shota Matsuda, Susumu Terajima, Masaya Kato, Takashi Tsukamoto, Aya Hisakawa and other main characters)
- 2009: Yakuza 3 (Satoshi Tokushike, Tatsuya Fujiwara, Nakamura Shidō II, Tetsuya Watari, Shigeru Izumiya, George Takahashi and other main characters)
- 2010: Yakuza 4 (Kōichi Yamadera, Hiroki Narimiya, Rikiya Koyama, Majyu Ozawa, Kenta Kiritani and other main characters)
