= Binary Domain =

2012 video game

- North American cover art
- Developer: Ryu Ga Gotoku Studio (Note: Ported to Windows by Devil's Details.)
- Publisher: Sega
- Director: Daisuke Sato
- Producer: Masayoshi Kikuchi
- Designer: Hiroyuki Sakamoto
- Programmers: Tatsuya Kaku; Takashi Atsu
- Artist: Nobuaki Mitake
- Writers: Tsuyoshi Furuta; Antony Johnston
- Composers: Hidenori Shoji; Mitsuharu Fukuyama Grandfunk: NEWDEAL; Gabriele Roberto; metalmouse; Spacewalker: Heigo Tani; Masao Mase; LSI; Atsuhiro Watanabe; SoundDrive: Yuya Saito; Toshihiro Tanaka; Yuichi Wakabayashi; Takatsugu Wakabayashi
- Platforms: PlayStation 3; Xbox 360; Windows
- Release: PlayStation 3, Xbox 360: JP: February 16, 2012; AU: February 23, 2012; EU: February 24, 2012; NA: February 28, 2012; Windows: WW: April 27, 2012
- Genre: Third-person shooter
- Modes: Single-player, multiplayer

Binary Domain (Note: Japanese: バイナリー ドメイン, Hepburn: Bainarī Domein) is a third-person shooter video game developed by Ryu Ga Gotoku Studio and published by Sega. It was released for PlayStation 3 and Xbox 360 in February 2012 and Windows in April 2012. The game is set in Tokyo, Japan, in the year 2080. It features innovative artificial intelligence technology.

The game is set in a world where global warming has caused worldwide flooding, leaving much of the world uninhabitable. As a result, robots were used as the main labor force. The game features a consequence system, which decides how non-playable characters in the squad view and trust the player in story mode. The game also features seven different multiplayer modes, with five classes being available for players to choose.

It was conceived by Toshihiro Nagoshi, who created the Like a Dragon video game series. The characters of Binary Domain were created with making realistic personalities and behavior in mind. The Consequence System was created to make the game as a competitive game in the third-person shooter genre. The game received mixed to positive reviews upon launch, with critics praising the game's story and Consequence System. However, it received criticisms regarding its voice recognition system. The game sold only 20,000 copies in North America by April 2012.

== Synopsis ==
=== Plot ===
In the game's backstory, global warming has caused worldwide flooding, leaving much of the world uninhabitable. This forced the governments to build new cities above the waterline, using the ruined cities as foundations. Since much of the world's population had died during the climate crisis, robots were used as the main labor force. An American-based company called Bergen controlled a very large majority of the world's robotic industries, making America much more powerful. A Japanese corporation named Amada tried to sue Bergen for stealing their technology in a patent dispute. Despite the fact that Amada was the first robotics company to create a humanoid robot, the lawsuit failed, since Bergen had a great amount of influence. This resulted in Bergen controlling 95 percent of the robotics market.

World economic concerns lead to the creation of the "New Geneva Convention", a new set of international laws. One of the clauses outlined, Clause 21, banned research into robots that could pass for humans, called "Hollow Children" in the game. A majority of the world's countries agreed to sign the convention into law. An organization called the International Robotics Technology Association (IRTA) created a global task-force, nicknamed "Rust Crews", to deal with breaches of the convention.

Years after the treaty was signed, an android (a "Hollow Child") attacked Bergen's headquarters in Detroit, Michigan, previously having no idea that he was a robot himself. Believing that robotics genius and founder of Amada corporation, Yoji Amada, created the robot, the IRTA sent one of their Rust Crews to Japan to find Amada and bring him in for questioning under orders from the UN Security Council. This starts the game with the Rust Crew entering Tokyo via the seawall which has become necessary due to sea rise. The game follows the Rust Crew as they fight their way through Tokyo, slowly unravelling the story behind Bergen, Amada and the "Hollow Children".

=== Characters ===
Rust Crew

The Rust Crew team in Japan, operating under the codename "Beetle". From left to right: Faye, Dan, Big Bo, Charles, Cain and Rachel

- Dan Marshall (ダン・マーシャル) – Dan was born to a lower class working family in Nebraska. Dan enlisted in the United States Army in order to escape poverty, much like Big Bo. He served together with Big Bo in the Special Forces prior to serving in Rust Crew, where he earned the nickname "Survivor". Dan holds the rank of First sergeant.
- Faye Lee (フェイ・リー) – The daughter of a People's Liberation Army officer at the Central Military Commission, Faye studied under the supervision of the People's Liberation Army General Staff Department at the Robotic Military Command Institute. She experienced combat at the GSD's Robotic Operations Squad prior to being transferred to Rust Crew. She holds the rank of First lieutenant.
- Roy Boateng (ロイ・ボーテン) – Roy was born into a lower class working family living in Massachusetts. He enlisted in the United States Army and eventually to the Special Forces to escape poverty. He played football in college. He was nicknamed "Big Bo". Big Bo holds the rank of First sergeant.
- Cain (カイン) – A combat android made by Bergen for IRTA's French division, Cain is named after his serial number "CN-7". He has numerous capabilities, including hacking. His Japanese deployment is seen by the IRTA as a test case to see if combat androids can be deployed in future Rust Crew operations. Cain's AI system was created from data stolen from Amada Corporation patents.
- Rachel Townsend (レイチェル・タウンゼント) – Born in the United Kingdom, Rachel was known to have high athletic marks with superior physical abilities and reflexes. She served alongside Charles Gregory when they were with MI6 prior to joining the Rust Crew.
- Charles Gregory (チャールズ・グレゴリー) – Born in the United Kingdom, Charles studied at the Royal Military Institute before he joined with the British military. He then served with Rachel in MI6, but was forced to leave after he sustained an injury while on duty. During his time with MI6, Charles had participated in British-sanctioned black operations throughout the Asian continent. Charles serves as the commanding officer of the Rust Crew deployed covertly to Japanese territory.
- Jean - a French Rust Crew member.
- Philips (フィリップス) – An officer in the United States Marine Corps who holds the rank of Major, he is in charge of launching the Rust Crew operation into Japan. He is also responsible for providing liaison support between the USMC and Rust Crew forces.

Resistance Forces

- Akira Shindo (新堂) – A leader of an anti-government guerrilla fighter unit based at the ruins of the Greater Tokyo Area, he was born and raised in the slums. Because of his experiences, Shindo believed that he needed to fight a guerrilla war in order to get people living in the slums a decent life. He joins up with the Rust Crew as an additional player for a short time.
- Yoshiki (ヨシキ) – A trusted guerrilla fighter in Shindo's unit, he has been with him since the beginning of his struggles. However, he does not know that he is an android programmed to infiltrate the unit to take it out from within.
- Yuki (ユキ) – A young girl who lives in the slums, Yuki serves the resistance indirectly by acting as a courier. She also works under Mifune by being a guide for the Rust Crew.
- Mifune (三船) – A Yakuza who earns a living through the black market, Mifune was able to acquire a massive amount of money that enables him to live an upper class lifestyle. He assists anti-government forces by providing arms and equipment through his smuggling operations. Mifune also served as the Rust Crew's main contact when the team attempted to infiltrate Japan.

Amada Corporation

- Yoji Amada (天田洋二) – A man known in the robotics industry for founding the Amada Corporation, he was credited for creating humanoid robots with advanced AI features at a young age. He used his profits to back a new political party called the New World Order, which eventually gained power and isolated Japan from the rest of the world. This backing resulted in numerous contracts to reconstruct Japan after the floods. He isolated himself from the world after he lost a court case where he accused the Bergen Corporation of stealing most of his patents. Amada is viewed with suspicion by the international community as the person behind the Hollow Children.

Bergen Corporation

- Alexander Bergen (アレクサンダー・ベルゲン) – The current CEO of Bergen Corporation, he was brought in to advise the American government after a Hollow Child was detected by the U.S. Secret Service from within the administration.

Police

- Kurosawa (黒澤) – A police officer working under the Japanese Ministry of Homeland Affairs, Kurosawa was placed in charge of investigating reports that the Rust Crew was able to infiltrate Japanese territory.

== Gameplay ==
A screenshot of combat showing Dan Marshall firing an Orochi G6 minigun at Japanese Assault Shooter security robots

The player can issue commands to squad mates by pressing certain buttons or by voice, either via a headset or the Kinect System using the voice command feature on the Xbox 360 console. The game's AI is able to recognize six different languages, including English and Japanese.

A major part of the game is its consequence system, which decides how the squad views and trusts the player in story mode. Their opinion of the player is based on how the player performs and treats team members. This affects both the storyline and gameplay, where the characters behave differently depending on trust levels. Conversations between the player and the squad members can also affect trust levels. The end of the game will change, depending on the level of trust the team members have in the player.

Stats of both the player and the squad members can be augmented with nanomachines that need to be fitted in place in a style similar to a jigsaw puzzle. These nanomachines, as well as weapon upgrades, can usually be bought at shops that the player can find throughout the game. The use of grenades in combat is supported through a visible parabolic arc, which helps players to adjust their aim. The enemy AIs in Binary Domain adjust themselves on how to fight back against the player's advance, depending on the situation. For example, they can work together in groups to flank the player's position or toss fragmentation grenades if the player is in one spot for too long. There are certain stages where player will need to navigate through dangerous obstacles and enemies in order to advance to the next stage.

=== Multiplayer ===
Several multiplayer classes are available: Scout, Sniper, Striker, Soldier, and Heavy Gunner. For the English localization, these classes were reported to consist of Special Operations, Recon, Demolitions, Assault, and Heavy Gunner. There are two factions, the Ministry of Homeland Affairs' Interior Security Administration Division and the resistance fighters. Multiplayer modes consist of Data Capture, Domain Control, Team Survival, Operation, Invasion, Team Deathmatch, and Free for All.

== Development ==
Binary Domain was announced on December 1, 2010. General director Toshihiro Nagoshi said that the theme he wanted to explore was about life, especially when it was expressed through the use of robots. He stated that despite not being a fan of the robot genre, he wishes to use it as a major part of the game's drama. Several brands were promoted in the game, such as Nissin Foods, Shochiku, Timex and Tokyo Marui.

The characters of Binary Domain were created with making realistic personalities and behavior in mind. For the creation of Cain, Art Director Nobuaki Mitake said that he had to be careful not to make it visually similar to the enemy robots encountered by the Rust Crew. To this end, Cain was given a "bit of alien elements while giving personalities to his design and motions to make him a bit closer to human." There were unique animation sequences done for a variety of enemy robots as well in order to make them unique. Nagoshi stated that he intended to "create the human drama in the action moments, rather than showing them one after another in cutscenes." The development team acclaimed for the Yakuza series aimed to appeal to a global audience and worked closely with Sega Europe and its producer Jun Yoshino.

According to Takashi Atsu, one of the game's programmers, he said that the team used the Hierarchical Finite State Machine, which is an algorithm program used to determine many factors, such as the robot's condition and ally information to judge their next move. The creation of the Consequence System was done to make Binary Domain as a competitive game in the third person shooter genre. By using the system, it would allow players to reach out to the NPCs who fight alongside them in the game's story in conjunction with the trust levels. The development team has spent much time recording many dialogue lines to market the game in more than six spoken languages.

== Marketing and release ==
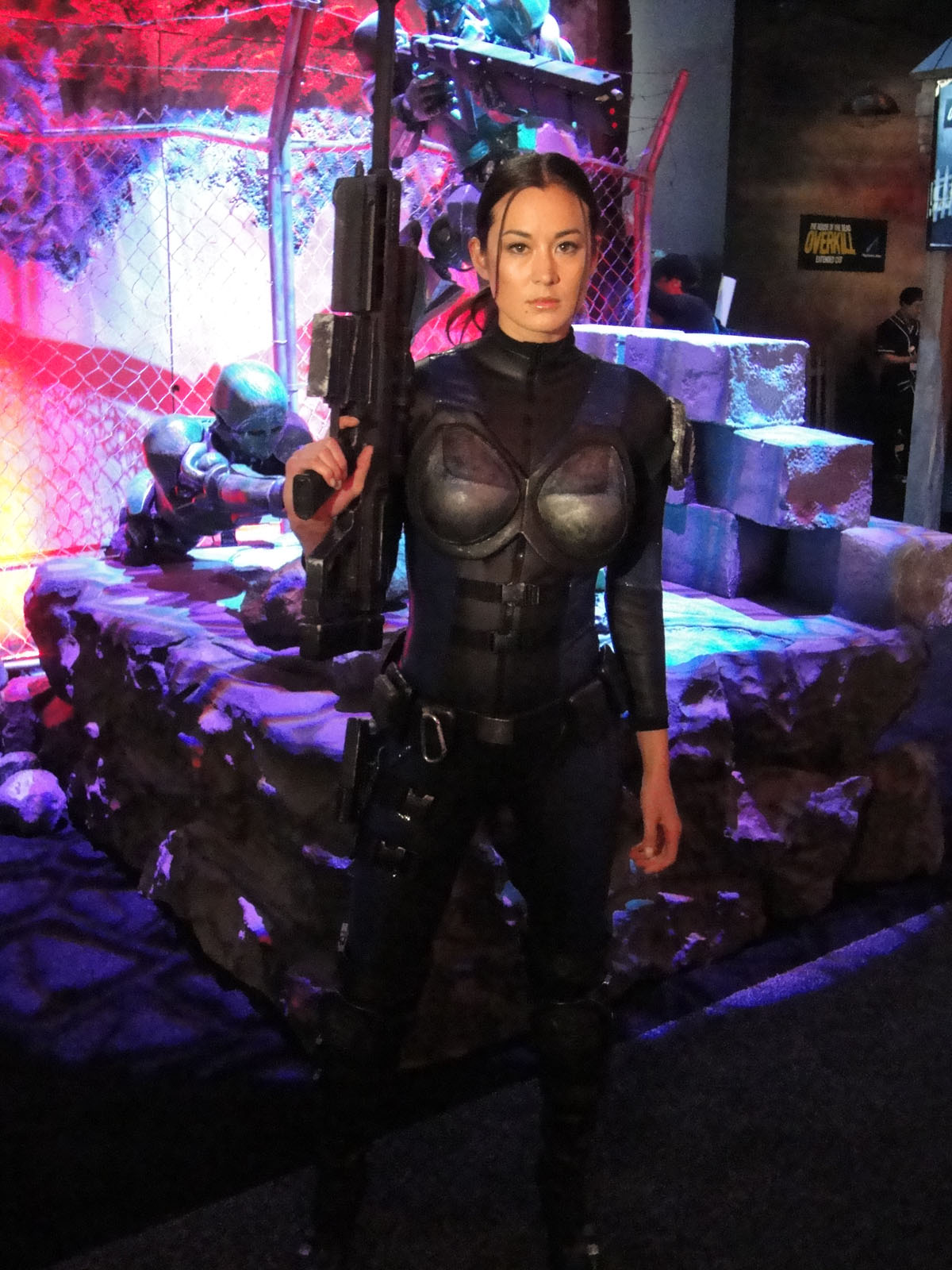
A promotional model dressed as Faye at E3 2011

Several videos were released on the Internet, detailing the everyday life of Mr. Assault, which was an enemy robot in the game. The trailers for the game utilized licensed music not featured in the game. The trailer titled "The Machine Age Has Begun" was released in April 2011, featuring music from 65daysofstatic's "Aren't We All Running", and narrated by Faye Lee, who speaks about the plot of the game, as well as emphasizing the importance of the trust feature in-game. In January 2012, a trailer titled "Bigger Than You Think" was released, using "When Things Explode" by Unkle featuring Ian Astbury, and primarily composed of in-game cutscene clips mixed with gameplay. Playable demo versions were shown at the Electronic Entertainment Expo 2011 and Tokyo Game Show 2011.

Sega released a pre-order exclusive for the game's multiplayer mode, which consists of the exclusive multiplayer map, "Outside High-rise, Upper City", the new Ninja class, and two multiplayer weapons, consisting of the Hoga Type 69 sniper rifle and the Yamato-0 revolver. Binary Domain was also released for the PC via Steam. Characters from the Like A Dragon series, including Kazuma Kiryu, Shun Akiyama, Ryuji Goda, and Goro Majima, were released as free downloadable content for use in the game's multiplayer. released in Japan on March 13, 2012. Customers who made pre-orders in Japan were able to acquire free download codes for the Kiryu multiplayer skin.

In November 2013, the game was made free for PlayStation Plus subscribers on the PlayStation 3 in North America.

== Reception ==
=== Critical reception ===
Reception

Aggregate score
| Aggregator | Score |
|---|---|
| Metacritic | PS3: 72/100; X360: 74/100; PC: 68/100 |

Review scores
| Publication | Score |
|---|---|
| Famitsu | 35/40 |
| Dengeki PlayStation | 85/100 |

Binary Domain received positive reviews from critics. Aggregating review website Metacritic gave the PlayStation 3 version 72/100, the Xbox 360 version 74/100, and the PC version 68/100.

Famitsu gave the game scores of 10, 9, 9, and 7, adding up to a total score of 35 out of 40. Another Japanese magazine Dengeki PlayStation has given the game scores of 80, 85, 90, and 85, averaging out to 85 out of 100.

GameSpot criticized the lag in multiplayer and that voice commands do not always get recognized by the game. Computer and Video Games shared GameSpot's criticism of the voice recognition system which was considered to be 'largely terrible' and was also unimpressed by the AI and level designs. They did, however, appreciate the interactive story elements. Eurogamer praised the lack of music as it allows gamers to factor in noise and in-game effects to determine their gaming strategy.

IGN noted that the game was somewhat derivative but nevertheless considered it to be "a fresh and often thrilling experience, with only a handful of negatives holding it back from greatness."

In a retrospective article published in 2015, Jon Gregory of Game Informer said he considered the game to be "one of the best third-person shooters from the last generation."

=== Sales ===
Despite favorable reviews, the game was a commercial failure, only selling 20,000 copies in North America by April 2012.

In Japan, it sold 73,683 copies when it was released, being the #2 game sold at the time. It remained in the top 20 on the Media Create sales chart by its third week of release, with the PlayStation 3 version selling 95,364 copies by March 4, 2012.

== Potential sequel ==
Producer Daisuke Sato mentioned in a July 2018 interview that he would be open to the idea of a sequel, as long as Sega is okay with it.
