= Like a Dragon: Prologue =

- Original DVD box
- Directed by: Takeshi Miyasaka
- Written by: Masaru Nakamura (credited as NAKA雅MURA)
- Based on: Yakuza by Sega
- Produced by: Artport
- Starring: Masakatsu Funaki; Mikio Ohosawa; Ayaka Maeda; Hirotaro Honda
- Music by: Kentaro Nijima
- Distributed by: Sega
- Release date: March 24, 2006 (Japan DVD)
- Running time: 43 minutes
- Country: Japan
- Language: Japanese

Like a Dragon ~ Prologue ~ (龍が如く 〜序章〜, Ryū ga Gotoku ~ Joshō ~), also known as Like a Dragon: Prologue, is a 2006 Japanese crime drama original video film directed by Takeshi Miyasaka with Takashi Miike as executive director. It is based upon Toshihiro Nagoshi's 2005 video game Ryū ga Gotoku, known in the West as Yakuza, released on PlayStation 2.

This drama stars puroresu champion Masakatsu Funaki in the title role and is a prequel to the inaugural installment of the Yakuza series, which was itself adapted by Takashi Miike as Like a Dragon: The Movie in 2007.

== Plot ==
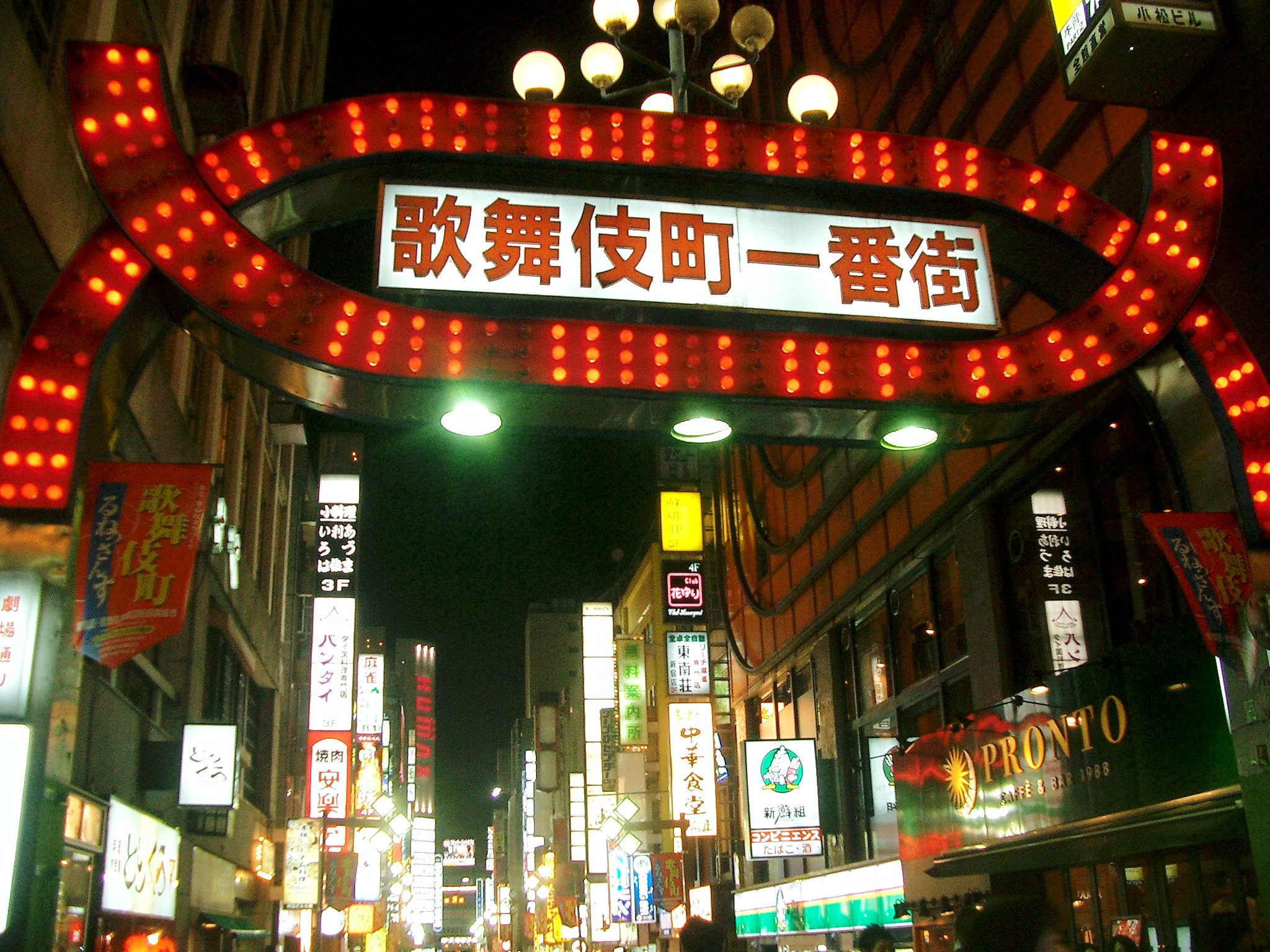
The movie was shot on location in Tokyo's Kabukicho (歌舞伎町) district which itself served as a basis for the background design of the game's Kamurocho area.

In 1970s-era Japan, three children, Kazuma Kiryu, Akira Nishikiyama (a.k.a. Nishiki), and his younger sister, Yuko Nishikiyama, are raised together in Shintaro Kazama (a.k.a. Fuma)'s Sunflower Orphanage. In the summer of 1980, Yumi Sawamura, a young girl whose parents were accidentally shot and killed during a gang's shootout, joins them in the orphanage. Following a yakuza tradition, the honorable Kazama secretly raises orphans whose parents he has directly or indirectly killed. In return, the children love him as a father and he eventually inducts the teenage Kiryu and Nishikiyama into the Dojima Family, a Tojo Clan affiliate of which he is a senior officer.

Years later, the promising Kiryu quickly rises through the yakuza hierarchy and earns the nickname "the Dragon of Dojima" for the dragon irezumi tattoo on his back (hence the original title Like a Dragon (龍が如く, Ryū ga Gotoku)). His childhood friend Nishikiyama is torn between loyalty for his kyodai (yakuza "brother") and jealousy against the one who has always been Kazama's protégé. Another subject of rivalry between the two friends is their secret love for Yumi, who looks up to them as her older brothers. In order to remain close to both of them, Yumi leaves the orphanage in 1990 and moves to Tokyo's red-light district Kamurocho, where she gets a job as a hostess at Reina's high-class bar Serena.

On October 1, 1995, Kiryu announces to his friends that he is ready to create his own yakuza family, which only lacks the go ahead from the Chairman of the Dojima Family, Sohei Dojima. Later that night, Dojima kidnaps Yumi from Serena, with Nishikiyama attempting to interfere only to be restrained by Dojima's bodyguards. When Nishikiyama eventually reaches the Chairman's office, he finds his boss raping Yumi and shoots him dead. Kiryu, who was at a meeting with Kazama before getting a worried call from Reina, arrives to find Dojima's dead body on the ground, Nishikiyama in shock, and Yumi curled up in fear. Kiryu decides that he will take responsibility for Dojima's murder in order to protect Yuko, who needs her brother Nishikiyama as she is about to get a desperately needed operation for her heart. Kiryu orders the pair to leave before the police arrives and holds Nishikiyama's gun, ready to surrender. The police conclude that the shooting is none of their concern, and Kiryu is sentenced to prison.

While en route to the hospital, Yumi has a flashback to her parents' murders and tries to jump out of the car. Nishikiyama calms her down, but she then escapes from the hospital and goes back to the only place she feels safe: Sunflower Orphanage, which is now closed and in ruins. The film ends with Kiryu nearing the end of his ten-year sentence and awaiting release.

== Cast ==
- Masakatsu Funaki as Kazuma Kiryu (桐生一馬). Kiryu is an honorable yakuza of the Dojima Family, known as the "Dragon of Dojima" for his strength and ferocity. He takes the fall for a murder committed by his blood brother to protect him.
- Mikio Ohosawa as Akira Nishikiyama (錦山彰). Nishikiyama is Kiryu's sworn brother and a member of the Dojima Family. He loves his brother, but is also jealous and resentful of Kiryu's accomplishments. When he kills the Dojima Chairman, he lets Kiryu take the blame.
- Ayaka Maeda as Yumi Sawamura (澤村由美). Yumi is the younger "sister" of Kiryu and Nishikiyama, both of whom are secretly in love with her. She is raped by their boss, an act that results in the impulsive Nishikiyama killing him.
- Harumi Sone as Sohei Dojima (堂島宗兵). Dojima is the Chairman of the Dojima Family, part of the Kanto-based Tojo Clan, a yakuza syndicate. He is thoroughly corrupted by his power, and rapes Yumi after abducting her on a whim. Nishikiyama shoots him without thinking, forcing Kiryu to take responsibility to protect his brother from punishment.
- Hirotaro Honda as Shintaro Kazama (風間新太郎). Kazama is an aging but highly respected yakuza and officer of the Dojima Family. He runs an orphanage, Sunflower, where he secretly raises the children of people killed by him or members of his family.
- Unknown actor as Sunflower principal, who manages the orphanage for Kazama.

== Video ==
As a direct-to-video product it was released on DVD by Sega on March 24, 2006 in Japan. Extra material included game FMVs.

The English subtitled version was released by Sega Europe on August 15, 2006 on the game's European website. It was made available as free VOD with four chapters called "episodes" available for download.
