= Hero Bank =

Anime and video game series

ヒーローバンク (Hīrō Banku)
- Video game
- Developer: Sega
- Publisher: Sega
- Genre: RPG
- Platform: Nintendo 3DS
- Released: March 20, 2014
- Anime television series
- Directed by: Yasutaka Yamamoto
- Written by: Atsuhiro Tomioka
- Studio: TMS Entertainment; 8PAN
- Original network: TXN (TV Tokyo)
- Original run: April 7, 2014 – March 30, 2015
- Episodes: 51
- Video game

Hero Bank 2
- Developer: Sega
- Publisher: Sega
- Genre: RPG
- Platform: Nintendo 3DS
- Released: November 27, 2014

Hero Bank (ヒーローバンク, Hīrō Banku) is a role-playing video game developed and published by Sega for the Nintendo 3DS. It was released in Japan on March 20, 2014. A sequel, Hero Bank 2, was released in Japan on November 27, 2014. An anime television series adaptation by TMS Entertainment began airing from April 7, 2014, and ended on March 30, 2015.

== Plot ==
In this world, players participate in a futuristic cyber sport called "Hero Battle" using Bankfon Gs or "Hero Gi", which allows them to rent powerful hero suits and fight battles against other players, receiving power boosts from the public. Kaito Gōshō, a young elementary school student who is always eager to help others, ends up hastily signing a contract to rent the powerful hero suit, Enter the Gold, from a mysterious priest named Sennen. However, he soon learns that this suit comes with a debt with 10 billion yen, which Kaito must now pay back by winning Hero Battles.

== Characters ==
Kaito Gōshō (豪勝 カイト, Gōshō Kaito)
Voiced by: Yūko Sanpei (1-26;32-51) Marie Mizuno (27-31)
The main protagonist, a hot-headed elementary school student who sports a regent hairdo and is known for making all sorts of crude jokes. He is the company president of the Gappori Company, which helps out others with various tasks. He obtains the powerful hero suit Enter the Gold (エンター・ザ・ゴールド, Entā za Gōrudo) from Sennen, but winds up with a 10 billion yen debt as a result.
Nagare Amano (天野 ナガレ, Amano Nagare)
Voiced by: Hiroshi Kamiya
Gappori Company's 'head of whatever' (or "Jack of all trades" to be more accurate) who often feels inferior to Kaito. Wanting to surpass him, he forms a contract with the Money Ghost, erasing his previous identity and granting him the power hero suit, The Dominion Dollar (ザ・ドミニオン・ダラー, Za Dominion Dorā).
Sekito Sakurada (桜田 セキト, Sakurada Sekito)
Voiced by: Kaito Ishikawa
Credit Loan Wolf (クレジット・ローンウルフ, Kurejito ron Urufu).
Mitsuo Zaizen (財前 ミツオ, Zaizen Mitsuo)
Voiced by: Miyuki Sawashiro
Gappori Company's managing director who is short and wears swirly glasses. His main hero suit is Game Console Beep Boop (ゲームキピコピコ, Gēmuki Pikopiko).
Fukuta Kanemaru (兼丸 フクタ, Kanemaru Fukuta)
Voiced by: Kazuya Nakai
Gappori Company's prophecy chief, who has a Frankenstein-esque appearance and often ends his sentences with "though" (ケド, kedo). He has a pet mouse named Platina (プラチナ, Purachina) who can predict the future, with Fukuta being the only one who can translate his readings. His main hero suit is Tea Picking Cat (チャツミネコ, Chatsumi Neko).
Boochokin (ブーチョッキン, Boochokin)
Voiced by: Mayumi Tanaka
A Pig.
Sennen (銭念)
Voiced by: Banjō Ginga
A mysterious priest who gave Kaito his Enter the Gold suit, along with his massive debt.
Money Ghost (マネーゴースト, Manē Gōsuto) / Sumimori Adachi (安立 純守, Adachi Sumimori)
Voiced by: Kenyu Horiuchi
A mysterious being who gave Nagare his The Dominion Dollar suit. He is soon revealed be Sumimori Adachi, the creator of Hero Battles, who vows revenge against money for the evils it has done.
Ai Gōshō (豪勝 アイ, Gōshō Ai)
Voiced by: Houko Kuwashima
Kaito's elder sister.
Zōan Gōshō (豪勝 蔵安, Gōshō Zōan)
Voiced by: Bin Shimada
Kaito's grandfather.
Isshin Uminari (海鳴 一心, Uminari Isshin)
Voiced by: Yū Kobayashi
A passionate boy who works in Big Money Bay's fishing district. His hero suit is Piscesamurai (ウオザムライ, Uozamurai).
Tetsunosuke "Kintetsu" Kanagata (金形 "キンテツ" 鉄之助, Kanagata "Kintetsu" Tetsunosuke)
Voiced by: Tetsu Inada
The son of a factory owner in Iron Town. As a result of protecting his father from an explosion, most of his body has been replaced with robotic parts. His hero suit is Karate Deiku (カラテデェーク, Karate Dēku).
Shishio Torai (虎井 獅子男, Torai Shishio)
Voiced by: Hisao Egawa
A bulky bully type who has a crush on Ai.
Deborah Kizaki (デボラ 貴崎, Debora Kizaki)
Voiced by: Ryōtarō Okiayu
The head of the Cyber Emperor company, which seeks to pave over the industrial parts of town. He uses the hero suit Baron the Euro (バロン・ザ・ユーロ, Baron za Yūro). He is defeated by Kaito and his company ends up bankrupt.
Rohan Yuri (由利 露藩, Yuri Rohan)
Voiced by: Ryōta Takeuchi
Li-Chi Long (龍 里千, Ron Rīchi)
Voiced by: Ayumi Fujimura
Hikari Takarano (宝乃 ヒカリ, Takarano Hikari)
Voiced by: Yuka Komatsu
A Hero Bank researcher who works alongside Sennen in fighting against Money Ghost.
Maki Kashii (香椎 真城, Kashii Maki)
Voiced by: Shiori Izawa
A TV reporter, whose name Kaito often mispronounces.
Announcer (実況, Jikkyō)
Voiced by: Shintarō Ōta

== Media ==
=== Video games ===
The video game, developed and published by Sega, was released in Japan on March 20, 2014. An arcade game has also been produced. A sequel, Hero Bank 2, was released on November 27, 2014.

=== Anime ===
An anime television series produced by TMS Entertainment began airing in Japan from April 7, 2014, and is being simulcast by Crunchyroll. The opening theme is "Kasege! Jarinko Hero!" (かせげ！ジャリンコヒーロー, Rake It In! Money Hero) by Nobuaki Kakuda, whilst the ending theme is "Sayonara Mata Itsuka" (サヨナラマタイツカ, Goodbye, Like Always) by Meg for the first 26 episodes. From episodes 27 to 51, The opening theme is "Kasege! Jarinko Hero!" (かせげ！ジャリンコヒーロー, Rake It In! Money Hero) by Kakuda featuring Kamen Joshi, whilst the ending theme is "SARB" by High speed boyz.

== See also ==
- Rent a Hero
