= Hidenari Ugaki =

Japanese actor (born 1963)

- 宇垣 秀成
- Born: July 25, 1963 (age 63); Tokyo, Japan
- Occupations: Actor; voice actor
- Agent: 81 Produce
- Website: Official profile

Hidenari Ugaki (宇垣 秀成, Ugaki Hidenari; born July 25, 1963) is a Japanese actor and voice actor affiliated with 81 Produce.

He is best known for his roles as Argo Gulskii in Mobile Fighter G Gundam, Donatello in the TV Tokyo dub of Teenage Mutant Ninja Turtles, Mr. Kaminari in the Doraemon television series, and Goro Majima in the Yakuza video game series.

== Filmography ==
=== Television animation ===
- Mobile Fighter G Gundam (1994) – Argo Gulskii, subordinate #B, thief #A
- Digimon Adventure (1999) – Nanomon
- Initial D: Second Stage (1999) – Papa (eps. 3–4)
- Crush Gear Turbo (2001) – Ming Wu
- Digimon Frontier (2002) – Wizardmon
- Rockman EXE (2002) – Bomberman
- Rockman EXE Stream (2005) – Bomberman
- Doraemon (2005) – Mr. Kaminari
- Aikatsu! (2012) – Miteru Itsumo
- JoJo's Bizarre Adventure: Stardust Crusaders (2015) – Khan, Chaka's father
- Kochoki: Wakaki Nobunaga (2019) – Shibata Katsuie
- Boruto: Naruto Next Generations (2019) – Gatai
- Shenmue (2022) – Chen Yao Wen
- The Human Crazy University (2022) – Professor
- The Aristocrat's Otherworldly Adventure: Serving Gods Who Go Too Far (2023) – Rex Terra Esfort
- Undead Girl Murder Farce (2023) – Passepartout
- I Parry Everything (2024) – Oaken

==== Unknown date ====
- Keroro Gunsō – Sanematsu
- Naruto – Fūjn
- Naruto Shippuden – Jinin Akebino
- One Piece – Yama
- Papuwa – Isami Kondou
- Pocket Monsters – Oji-san, Kaneyo's servant
- Pocket Monsters Advanced Generation – Donfan, Ogata
- Regalia: The Three Sacred Stars – Theodore Moore
- Soreike! Anpanman – Dojō-chichi, Shōyu-kun
- Gintama – Hachirou

=== Original net animation (ONA) ===
- Lost Song (2018) – King of Golt (eps. 2, 8, 11), Army Corps Chief (ep. 3)
- Tekken: Bloodline (2022) – Ganryu
- Cyberpunk: Edgerunners (2022) – Principal

=== Original video animation (OVA) ===
- Crows (1994) – Harumichi Bōya
- JoJo's Bizarre Adventure (xxxx) – Pilot B
- Kikaider 01: The Animation (xxxx) – Red Hakaider
- La Blue Girl (1994) – Danjo Matsunaga
- Melty Lancer: The Animation (xxxx) – I
- Mobile Suit Gundam SEED Astray (xxxx) – Reed Wheeler
- Mutant Turtles: Superman Legend (1996) – Donatello
- Street Fighter Zero (1999) – Zangief

=== Theatrical animation ===
- Evangelion New Theatrical Version: Beginning (xxxx) – Soldier
- Pocket Monsters: Mewtwo Strikes Back (1998) – Researcher #A
- Tekken: Blood Vengeance (2011) – Ganryu
- Crayon Shin-chan: The Storm Called: The Battle of the Warring States (2002) – Gonbe Sakuma
- Tokyo Godfathers (2003) – Additional voices

=== Video games ===
Year	Title	Role	Console	Source
2001	Final Fantasy X	Wen Kinoc, O'aka XXIII, other minor characters	PlayStation 2	
2003	Mega Man Network Transmission	Zero	GameCube	
2005	Yakuza	Goro Majima	PlayStation 2, PlayStation 3, Wii U	
2006	Yakuza 2	Goro Majima	PlayStation 2, PlayStation 3, Wii U	
2008	Ryu Ga Gotoku Kenzan!	Majima Gorohachi/Shishido Baiken	PlayStation 3	
2009	Yakuza 3	Goro Majima	PlayStation 3, PlayStation 4, Microsoft Windows, Xbox One	
2010	Yakuza 4	Goro Majima	PlayStation 3, PlayStation 4, Microsoft Windows, Xbox One	
2012	Yakuza 5	Goro Majima	PlayStation 3, PlayStation 4, Microsoft Windows, Xbox One	
2014	Ryu Ga Gotoku Ishin!	Hirayama Goro/Okita Soji	PlayStation 3, PlayStation 4	
2015	Yakuza 0	Goro Majima	PlayStation 3, PlayStation 4, Microsoft Windows, Xbox One	
2015	Project X Zone 2	Goro Majima	Nintendo 3DS	
2016	Yakuza Kiwami	Goro Majima	PlayStation 3, PlayStation 4, Microsoft Windows, Xbox One	
2016	Street Fighter V	Birdie	PlayStation 4, Microsoft Windows, Arcade	
2016	Yakuza 6	Goro Majima	PlayStation 4, Microsoft Windows, Xbox One	
2017	Yakuza Kiwami 2	Goro Majima	PlayStation 4, Microsoft Windows, Xbox One	
2020	Yakuza: Like a Dragon	Goro Majima	PlayStation 4, PlayStation 5, Microsoft Windows, Xbox One, Xbox Series X	
2023	Like a Dragon: Ishin!	Hirayama Goro/ Okita Soji	PlayStation 4, PlayStation 5, Xbox One, Xbox Series X, Microsoft Windows	
2023	Like a Dragon Gaiden: The Man Who Erased The Name	Goro Majima	PlayStation 4, PlayStation 5, Microsoft Windows, Xbox One, Xbox Series X	
2024	Like a Dragon: Infinite Wealth	Goro Majima	PlayStation 4, PlayStation 5, Microsoft Windows, Xbox One, Xbox Series X	
2025	Like a Dragon: Pirate Yakuza in Hawaii	Goro Majima	PlayStation 4, PlayStation 5, Microsoft Windows, Xbox One, Xbox Series X	
2025	Yakuza 0: Director's Cut	Goro Majima	Nintendo Switch 2	
2026	Shinobi: Art of Vengeance ("Sega Villains Stage" DLC)	Goro Majima	Nintendo Switch, PlayStation 4, PlayStation 5, Microsoft Windows, Xbox One, Xbox Series X	

- Orphen: Scion of Sorcery (2000) – Rufus
- Tekken 5 (2004) – Ganryu
- Atelier Iris 2: The Azoth of Destiny – Galahad
- Tekken 6 (2007) – Ganryu
- Ryū ga Gotoku Kenzan! (2008) – Majima Gorohachi/Shishido Baiken
- Yakuza: Dead Souls (2011) – Goro Majima
- Tekken Tag Tournament 2 (2011) – Ganryu
- Everybody's Golf 6 (2011) – Max
- Tekken 3D: Prime Edition (2012) – Ganryu
- Ryū ga Gotoku Ishin! (2014) – Okita Sōji
- Hokuto ga Gotoku (2018) – Jagi
- Tekken 7 (2019) – Ganryu

=== Tokusatsu ===
- B-Fighter Kabuto (1996) – Leaping Fist Beast Gangaroo (ep. 10), Rightful Warrior Beast Driceraija (ep. 26 - 27)
- Denji Sentai Megaranger (1997) – Stingray Nejire (ep. 2)
- Seijuu Sentai Gingaman (1998) – Rigurou (ep. 3)
- Hyakujuu Sentai GaoRanger (2001) – Boat Org (ep. 7)
- Ninpuu Sentai Hurricaneger (2003) – Gravity Ninja Omo-Karu (ep. 27)
- Bakuryu Sentai Abaranger (2003–2004) – Visionary Messenger Voffa (eps. 1 - 48)/DezumoVoorla (Voice of Masaharu Sato and Bunkou Ogata) (ep. 48)
- Bakuryū Sentai Abaranger DELUXE: Abare Summer is Freezing Cold! (2003) – Visionary Messenger Voffa
- Bakuryū Sentai Abaranger vs. Hurricaneger (2004) – Visionary Messenger Voffa
- Engine Sentai Go-onger vs. Gekiranger (2009) – Confrontation Beast Tortoise-Fist Meka
- Samurai Sentai Shinkenger (2009) – Ayakashi Okakurage (ep. 10)
- Tensou Sentai Goseiger (2010) – Brasca Alien Mizogu of the Clump (ep. 1)
- Ultraman X (2015) (Mold Spectre (ep. 13 - 14) /Guar Spectre (Voice of Minami Tsukui) (ep. 14)
- Kamen Rider Ghost (2015) – Yamaarashi-Roid (ep. 24)
- Ultra Fight Orb (2017) – Reibatos
- Kaitou Sentai Lupinranger VS Keisatsu Sentai Patranger (2018) – Merg Arita (ep. 7)

=== Dubbing roles ===
==== Live-action ====
- Back to the Future Part III (2018 BS Japan edition) – Zeke (Harry Carey Jr.)
- Death on the Nile – Monsieur Blondin (Rick Warden)
- ER – Fritz (tenth season), Otto (twelfth season), Fred (thirteenth season)
- The Little Things – LASD Captain Carl Farris (Terry Kinney)
- The Magnificent Seven – Gavin David (Ritchie Montgomery)
- Mighty Morphin Power Rangers – Lokar
- Pig – Chef Derek Finway (David Knell)
- Teenage Mutant Ninja Turtles III – Donatello

==== Animation ====
- Bob the Builder – Roley
- Class of 3000 – Principal Luna
- Gravity Falls – Stanford Pines
- Motorcity – Jacob
- Teenage Mutant Ninja Turtles (1987 TV series) (TV Tokyo edition) – Donatello
- Teenage Mutant Ninja Turtles (2003 TV series) – Shredder
- Teenage Mutant Ninja Turtles (2012 TV series) – '87 Donatello
- Teen Titans – Slade
- The Ant Bully – Glow Worm
- Thomas & Friends – Captain (Misty Island Rescue DVD onwards, replacing Kentarō Hayami)
