= Spikeout: Battle Street =

2005 video game

- European boxart
- Developer: Dimps
- Publisher: Sega
- Director: Mitsunori Fujimoto
- Producer: Toshihiro Nagoshi
- Artists: Hiroaki Hashimoto; Wilson Mui
- Composers: Shinji Hosoe; Ayako Saso
- Platform: Xbox
- Release: JP: March 24, 2005; NA: March 29, 2005; EU: April 22, 2005
- Genre: Beat 'em up
- Modes: Single-player; multiplayer (co-op)

Spikeout: Battle Street (Note: Spikeout: Battle Street (SPIKEOUT(スパイクアウト)：バトル ストリート, Supaikauto: Batoru Sutorīto)) is a 2005 beat 'em up game developed by Dimps and published by Sega for the Xbox. It is a successor to Sega's SpikeOut

Spikeout: Battle Street included online multiplayer through Xbox Live which was shut down on April 15, 2010. The game is now supported online with replacement online servers for the Xbox called Insignia.

== Reception ==
Reception

Aggregate score
Aggregator	Score
Metacritic	54/100

Review scores
Publication	Score
Edge	4/10
Famitsu	28/40
Game Informer	6.25/10
GameSpot	5.2/10
GameSpy	3.5/5
IGN	5.5/10
Official Xbox Magazine (US)	4.8/10
TeamXbox	7.9/10
VideoGamer.com	5/10
X-Play	1/5

The game received "mixed" reviews according to the review aggregation website Metacritic. In Japan, Famitsu gave it a score of all four sevens for a total of 28 out of 40.
