= Hidenori Shoji =

Japanese video game composer

- 庄司 英徳
- Born: January 7, 1975 (age 51); Mito, Ibaraki, Japan
- Occupations: Composer; musician
- Employer: Sega (1996–present)
- Musical career
- Genres: Video game music
- Instrument: Guitar

Hidenori Shoji (庄司 英徳, Shōji Hidenori) is a Japanese video game composer who has contributed to such Sega titles as Fighting Vipers 2 (1998) and F-Zero GX (2003). He is best known for his work as the music director of the Yakuza series and its Judgment spin-off series. He is a member of H., a band composed of Sega sound designers.

== Live performances ==
Shoji performed two songs from the Yakuza series at the 2008 Tokyo Game Show. Together with H., he performed several rock arrangements of Out Run and Fantasy Zone themes at music event in October 2008.

== Discography ==
List of video game music production credits
Year	Title	Notes	Ref.
1996	Virtua Fighter 3	With Takenobu Mitsuyoshi and Fumio Ito	
1996	Sega Touring Car Championship		
1997	Digital Dance Mix Vol. 1 Namie Amuro		
1998	Fighting Vipers 2		
1998	SpikeOut	With Shunsuke Suzuki	
2000	SlashOut		
2001	Spikers Battle		
2001	Super Monkey Ball	With Haruyoshi Tomita and Sakae Osumi	
2002	Super Monkey Ball 2	With Haruyoshi Tomita	
2003	F-Zero GX	With Daiki Kasho	
2005	Yakuza	Sound director.	
2006	Yakuza 2	With Hideki Sakamoto, Norihiko Hibino, and Takahiro Izutani	
2008	Ryū ga Gotoku Kenzan!	With Hideki Sakamoto, Hiroyoshi Kato, and Keisuke Ito	
2009	Yakuza 3		
2010	Yakuza 4		
2010	Kurohyo: Ryu ga Gotoku Shinsho		
2012	Binary Domain	Sound director	
2012	Yakuza 5		
2013	Code of Joker	"Electronic Brain"	
2014	Like a Dragon: Ishin!		
2015	Yakuza 0		
2016	Yakuza Kiwami		
2016	Yakuza 6: The Song of Life		
2017	Yakuza Kiwami 2	Music director	
2018	Fist of the North Star: Lost Paradise	Music director	
2018	Judgment	Music director	
2019	Super Monkey Ball: Banana Blitz HD	Music with Chihiro Aoki and Yuri Fukuda	
2020	Yakuza: Like a Dragon	Music director	
2021	Lost Judgment	Music director	
2021	Super Monkey Ball Banana Mania		
2023	404 Game Re:set	"Re;sistant"	
2023	Sonic Superstars	"Speed Jungle Zone Act 2"	
2024	Like a Dragon: Infinite Wealth		
2026	Sega Football Club Champions		
