= Ryū ga Gotoku Kenzan! =

2008 video game

- Developer: New Entertainment R&D Dept.
- Publisher: Sega
- Director: Daisuke Sato
- Producer: Masayoshi Kikuchi
- Artist: Kazuki Hosokawa
- Writer: Masayoshi Yokoyama
- Composers: Hidenori Shoji; Hideki Sakamoto; Hiroyoshi Kato; Keisuke Ito
- Series: Like a Dragon
- Platform: PlayStation 3
- Release: JP: March 6, 2008
- Genres: Action-adventure, hack and slash, beat 'em up
- Mode: Single-player

Ryū ga Gotoku Kenzan! (Note: Japanese: 龍が如く 見参！, Hepburn: Ryū ga Gotoku Kenzan!; lit. "Like a Dragon Arrival!") is a 2008 action-adventure video game developed and published by Sega for the PlayStation 3. It is a jidaigeki-themed spin-off game in the Like a Dragon series. It was unveiled at the Tokyo Game Show 2007 and released exclusively in Japan on March 6, 2008.

Kenzan! is a dramatic telling of the life of the historical figure Miyamoto Musashi, who retired and adopted a new identity, but is later drawn into a new conflict where he must hunt down an imposter using his namesake. A second Like a Dragon series spin-off set in samurai era, Ryū ga Gotoku Ishin!, was released in 2014 on both the PlayStation 3 and the PlayStation 4 systems, though Ishin! is set two centuries later than Kenzan! and is not considered a narrative sequel.

== Gameplay ==
Kenzan's gameplay utilizes a similar combat system as Yakuza and Yakuza 2, with little change and innovation, except for the new item storage system which allows access to an unlimited number of items from savepoints. There are four fighting styles in the game; fists, one blade, two blades and two-handed blades. There are also QTE-based special moves that the player can execute, known as "heat actions".

== Plot ==
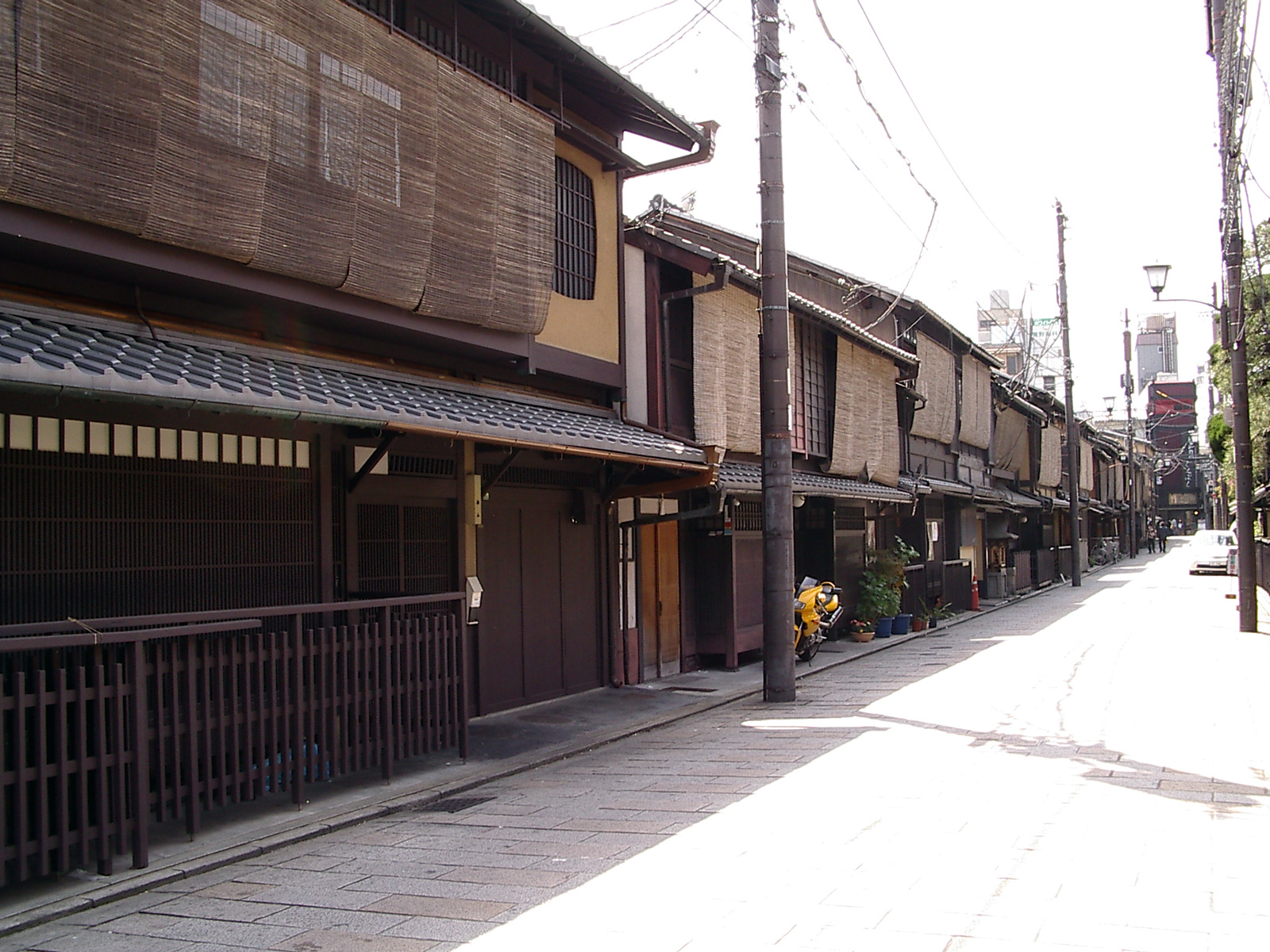
The action moves from Kamurocho to Kyoto's Gion district.

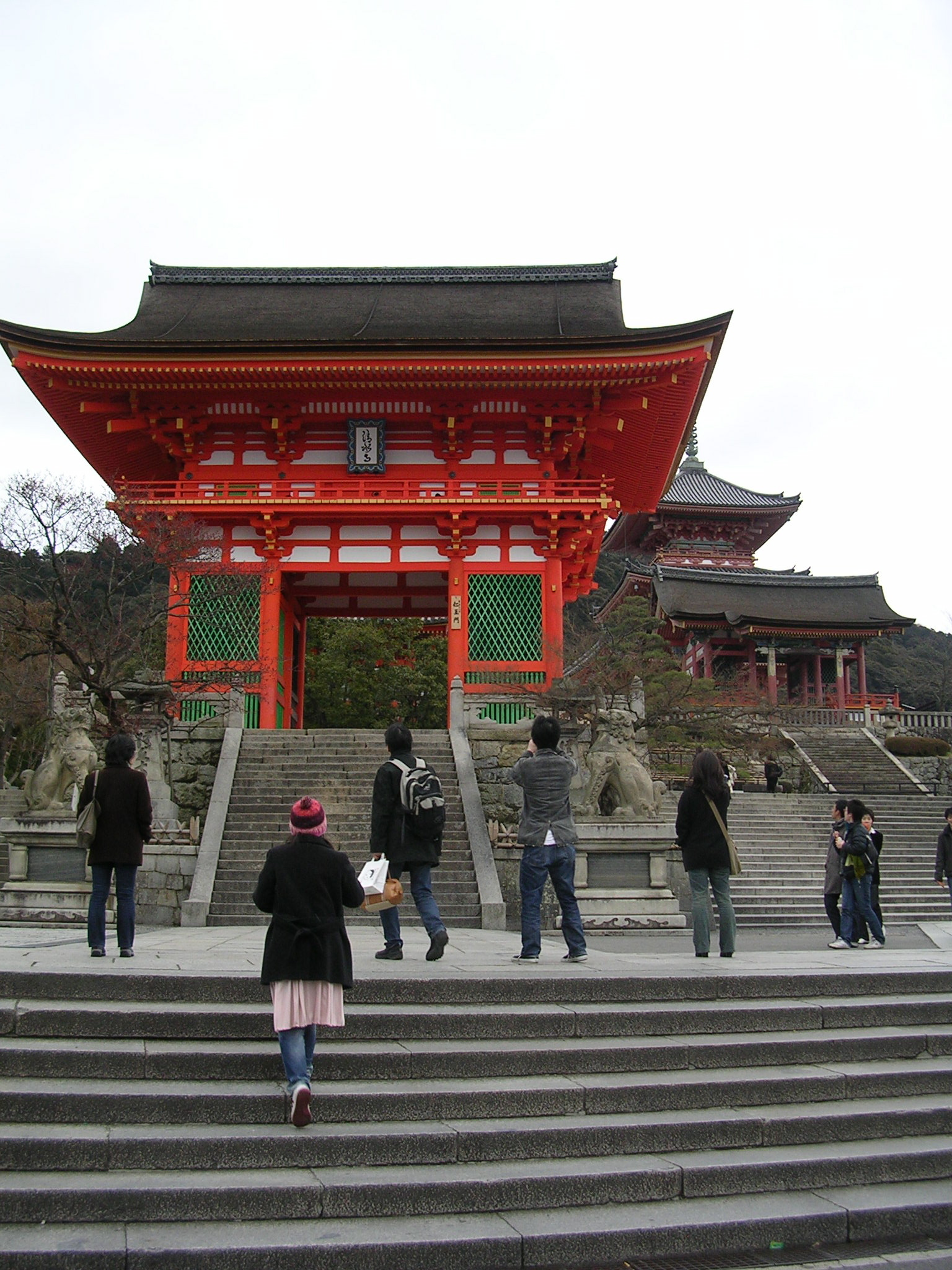
Landmarks such as the Kiyomizu Temple and Nijō Castle are modeled in the game.

=== Setting and characters ===
Ryu ga Gotoku Kenzan! is set in Kyoto during the Edo period, in 1605. It is an account of the life of Miyamoto Musashi (Takaya Kuroda), who resides in the Gion district using the alias Kiryu Kazumanosuke. Kiryu is forced out of retirement when a young girl, Haruka (Rie Kugimiya), requests him to kill an imposter using his old namesake. Major characters in the game include: Itō Ittōsai (Susumu Terajima), Kiryu's friend and a bodyguard of the Tsuruya brothel; Yoshino (Aya Hisakawa), a courtesan acquainted with Kiryu who works at Tsuruya; Marume Nagayoshi (Naoto Takenaka), the General of the Tokugawa Clan's army; Nankobo Tenkai (Kenji Utsumi), the emissary of the Shogunate Administration; Majima Gorohachi (Hidenari Ugaki), a notorious swordsman in the Tokugawa army; Sasaki Kojirō (Shota Matsuda), a swordsman who rebels against the Tokugawa Bakufu; Yagyū Sekishusai (Hiroki Matsukata), a mysterious monk who aids Kiryu in his quest; Hon'ami Kōetsu (Yoshiaki Fujiwara), a famous painter who also operates as an information broker; Yoshioka Seijuro (Masaya Kato) and Yoshioka Denshichiro (Taiki Matsuno), masters of the famed Yoshioka Dojo; Gion Toji (Takashi Tsukamoto) and Ueda Ryohei (Hisao Egawa), students of the Yoshioka Dojo; Tokugawa Ieyasu (Osamu Saka), the first Tokugawa shogun of Japan; and Tokugawa Hidetada (Masaya Onosaka), Ieyasu's third-born son who became shogun following the former's retirement.

=== Synopsis ===
In 1600, the swordsman Miyamoto Musashi is requested by General Marume Nagayoshi to aid the imminent battle at Sekigahara, between the armies of the Tokugawa and Toyotomi clans. The night before the battle, Miyamoto is assigned to assassinate a traitor within the Tokugawa clan's army, with the help of fellow soldier Majima Gorohachi. After carrying out the task, Miyamoto learns that his target was actually Yūki Hideyasu, the heir to the Tokugawa clan. Both Miyamoto and Majima escape, and later reunite with Marume, though he betrays them. Both men are also attacked by a platoon of soldiers led by Sasaki Kojirō, who bests them in combat. Nevertheless, the pair manage to escape Sasaki and Marume.

Many days later, Miyamoto and Majima are attacked once more by Tokugawa soldiers, but Majima seemingly sacrifices himself to allow Miyamoto to escape. Miyamoto takes Majima's sword to his village, and meets with his adopted sister, Ukiyo. The former learns that Majima was not Ukiyo's brother, but rather the murderer of her father, but Majima had taken up the duty of protecting Ukiyo and her village as penance for his sin. Miyamoto decides to give up his old life and stay with Ukiyo. A year later, bounty hunters arrive at the village looking for Majima, but recognize Miyamoto and fight him. Despite his efforts, Miyamoto is unable to prevent the hunters from fatally wounding Ukiyo. Miyamoto leaves behind one of his swords at Ukiyo's grave, then leaves the village. He fends off more bounty hunters until he is rescued by a wandering monk, who points him toward the Gion district. At Gion, Miyamoto encounters a courtesan named Yoshino, who bears a striking resemblance to Ukiyo. He ends up becoming a bodyguard for the Tsuruya brothel after saving one of the courtesans. The monk gives Miyamoto a new name: Kiryu Kazumanosuke.

In 1605, Kiryu is approached by a young girl named Haruka, who asks him to kill "Miyamoto Musashi", who allegedly murdered her parents. Kiryu initially declines, then later agrees to take the job when Haruka sells herself to Tsuruya and becomes a courtesan. Kiryu meets with the information broker Hon'ami Kōetsu, who tasks him with recovering a golden statue from a gang of thieves led by Shishido Baiken. To his surprise, Kiryu discovers that Shishido is actually Majima, who has become amnesiac following his sacrifice to save Miyamoto five years ago. After defeating Majima in combat, Kiryu acquires the statue for Kōetsu. Kōetsu reveals to Kiryu that he knew of the latter's identity, but decided to respect his wish and not expose him. He also reveals that a swordsman bearing the name "Miyamoto Musashi" has been wandering around various dojos for five years issuing them challenges. Kiryu follows up on Kōetsu's information and goes to the Yoshioka Dojo, "Miyamoto"'s next target.

Kiryu bribes a Yoshioka student, Gion Toji, to gain access to their entrance exam. The dojo's masters, the Yoshioka brothers Seijuro and Denshichiro, argue over accepting Kiryu into the dojo, due to his status as a masterless samurai. Eventually, they decide to have him battle Seijuro. Kiryu emerges victorious and is accepted, but Toji reveals that he knows of Kiryu's true identity, having previously been a part of Marume's army, and that Kiryu must represent the dojo in fighting "Miyamoto". Kiryu trains with the Yoshioka Dojo for a month in preparation. He is later greeted by an old friend, Itō Ittōsai, who accuses him of being Miyamoto. Kiryu defeats Itō and confesses; the latter reveals that his family was killed ten years prior by Sasaki, and he wants to claim the right to kill him from Kiryu. Itō informs Kiryu that Sasaki will be in Gion in two days to attend a banquet, in celebration of the new Governor of Kyoto, Itakura Katsushige. The pair plot to kill Sasaki on the night of the banquet; Kiryu also learns from Kōetsu that Marume will attend the banquet.

On the night of the banquet, Sasaki arrives and kills the attendees at Tsuruya. Kiryu and Itō confront him, but before they could kill him, the brothel is set on fire. Kiryu seeks out Haruka, who had been tasked to serve Governor Itakura, and saves her, while Itakura is killed by Marume. Days later, Kiryu tries to speak to Haruka, but the latter refuses, revealing that she knew of his identity, and that her parents' murderer had a charm tied to their sword, similar to his. Kōetsu later informs Kiryu that "Miyamoto" is attending a tournament at Hozoin Temple, prompting him to sign up for the tournament. He finds out, however, that it was a ruse, set up by the temple's masters and Marume. Marume reveals to Kiryu that Itakura was sent to take Haruka back to the Tokugawa Bakufu, and that both Marume and Sasaki were tasked by the same master to kill her; though Marume could not commit the deed. Marume stresses to Kiryu that Haruka bears great importance, though he refuses to elaborate further.

On the day of "Miyamoto"'s duel with the Yoshioka Dojo, Kiryu meets with Seijuro, who accuses him of being a spy, and fights him. Kiryu is forced to kill Seijuro in defense, but he then learns that the challenge was fabricated by Toji and fellow Yoshioka student Ueda Ryohei, who sought to usurp the Yoshioka brothers and take over the dojo. Itō arrives to fight Ueda, allowing Kiryu to find Toji before he could kill Denshichiro. Despite Toji's attempts to dissuade him, Kiryu fights and kill the former, then apologizes to Denshichiro for killing his brother. The next day, Kiryu meets with Ito and Kōetsu to discuss their next move. An old man who visits Kōetsu requests Kiryu to take him to Tsuruya to visit a relative. Upon returning to Tsuruya and meeting with Majima, the old man reveals to Kiryu that his relative was Haruka, and that he intends to buy her freedom from Tsuruya. Afterwards, Majima accidentally trips on a cobblestone and hits his head, recovering his memory in the process. Upon seeing Yoshino and mistaking her for Ukiyo, Majima deduces that Kiryu sold his sister to the brothel, and kidnaps Haruka. Kiryu learns of the kidnapping, and goes to Kiyomizu Temple to confront Majima. Yoshino stops them from fighting and reveals that she is Ukiyo's sister, Ageha, who sold herself to Tsuruya to give Ukiyo money.

Sasaki arrives at the temple, and reveals that Yoshino took his money to buy her own freedom, in exchange for setting Tsuruya on fire. He attempts to kill Haruka, but Majima stops him, though he is wounded and falls off a cliff afterwards. The old man arrives, prompting Sasaki to leave. The old man reveals to Kiryu and Haruka that he is the former shogun Tokugawa Ieyasu, and that he is also Haruka's grandfather. Her father, Yuki, was indeed murdered by Kiryu five years prior, under Marume's orders, who in turn took orders from the imperial liaison Nankobo Tenkai, as part of a plot to set up Ieyasu's third-born son, the easily manipulated Hidetada, as the next shogun. Marume was ordered by Tenkai to also murder Haruka and her adoptive family afterwards, but he could not carry out the deed and let her escape. At the time, Marume carried a sword similar to Kiryu's, which caused Haruka to mistake Kiryu as the killer. Ieyasu offers Haruka to come back to Edo Castle with him, but she refuses, wishing to stay with Kiryu and Yoshino. Ieyasu tells Kiryu to travel to Yagyū village and find the legendary swordsman Yagyū Sekishusai, in order to learn more about those who plotted against him and Haruka. Kiryu spends the night with Yoshino, then travels to Yagyū, where he learns that Sekishusai was the wandering monk who helped him years ago. Sekishusai reveals to Kiryu that Sasaki is actually his son, who was blackmailed by Tenkai to do his bidding. Marume arrives at Yagyū and reveals that he also betrayed Tenkai years ago and has been helping the Tokugawa clan and Sekishusai to foil his plan. After begging for Kiryu's forgiveness, the two of them duel, with Kiryu emerging victorious.

Upon returning to Gion, Kiryu finds that Haruka has gone missing with no traces. One week later, during a celebration at Tsuruya of Yoshino's freedom and engagement to Kiryu, Sasaki arrives and informs Kiryu that he kidnapped Haruka and took her to Tenkai, who wishes to marry her to his puppet shogun, whom he intends to replace Hidetada with. Kiryu bids farewell to his friends and embarks to Ganryū-jima, where he duels with Sasaki and defeats him. Tenkai appears and shoots Sasaki, boasting the imminent arrival of his army that would overthrow Hidetada. A defiant Kiryu defeats Tenkai's men before facing Tenkai himself and rescuing Haruka. Hidetada arrives at Ganryū, intending to kill Tenkai, but Kiryu stops him from doing so, suggesting that a trial be given to the traitor. However, as Tenkai's army approaches the island, a vengeful Sasaki kills Tenkai. Kiryu instructs Sasaki and Hidetada to escape with Haruka in tow, while he stays behind to fend off the army. As the army disembarks, Kiryu charges at them, his fate ultimately left unknown.

Ten years later, in 1615, Sasaki, having gone back to using his birth name Yagyū Munenori, joins Marume in commanding Tokugawa's forces to fight the Toyotomi Clan during the Siege of Osaka. The men form a plot to rescue Hidetada's daughter from enemy forces, with many volunteering to do it, having been inspired by the legend of Miyamoto Musashi. Elsewhere, a surviving Majima ponders whether Kiryu survived his fight with Tenkai's army.

== Development ==
After successfully releasing the first two Like a Dragon games on the PlayStation 2, the development team initially made fun of their goal of making the next game for the then-new PlayStation 3, while also moving to a different setting. However, they managed to make it in just over a year, and the staff felt refreshed.

Developing the title for the PlayStation 3 for the first time, Like a Dragon producer Masayoshi Kikuchi, known for his previous work on Panzer Dragoon and Jet Set Radio, felt unconstrained from the hardware constraints of earlier systems. Previously, Kikuchi's colleagues were restricted to conceptualizing ideas that were strictly feasible within the limitations of bespoke hardware. The initial concept of Kenzan originated from the premise, "What if Kazuma Kiryū were Miyamoto Musashi?" Upon deciding the concept had potential, the team moved forward with production. Kikuchi noted that few video games set in the Edo period matched the intended scale of Kenzan. Recreating the primary setting of Gion, a fictionalized entertainment district, presented a significant challenge for the development team; using historical references as a foundation, they had to rely on their imagination to appropriately depict an Edo-period entertainment district. To ensure the combat system felt authentic and satisfying, the lead combat designer, who held a black belt, worked alongside the team to interview a practitioner of iaidō. Additionally, because Miyamoto Musashi was also a renowned calligrapher, the developers incorporated calligraphy into the "Revelation" sequences, through which players learn new "Heat Actions." Regarding the game's side content, Kikuchi stated that his favorite minigame is Turtle Racing. As an avid player of horse racing games during his student years, he expressed high satisfaction with how the minigame turned out.

Cyberware Inc.'s facial scan technology was used with main characters and fully exploited on the Event Mode's high polygon models. Here, the character Gion Toji borrows actor Takashi Tsukamoto's physical appearance.

Kenzan is the first game in the series where the games' main characters have their face modeled in 3D after their voice actors who are Japanese celebrities. Cyberware's color 3D scanner (model PS) was used to analyze each actor's head & face in order to collect data on its shape and appearance, then this file was worked with the Softimage XSI 3D graphics application.

== Releases ==
=== Trial versions ===
Two playable demos were released on January 7, 2008, via the Japanese PlayStation Store. The first demo included sandbox play, and the second had a collection of various combat and romantic gameplay segments.

As part of the pre-ordering campaign, the Japanese first print was bundled with a limited item, a monography called Kamutai Magazine (March 2008 issue). Sony celebrated the Japanese release of the game with a 10,000 pieces limited edition Satin Silver 40GB model "PlayStation 3 Ryū ga Gotoku Kenzan! Pack" (PlayStation®3 龍が如く 見参！パック, Ryū Ga Gotoku Kenzan! Pakku) SKU including a "Rising Dragon" (昇竜, Noburyū) stickers set to customize the console case.

=== Asian and western markets ===
The Japanese version was released on March 6, 2008, in both Japan and South East Asia, while Sony published it in South Korea on March 25, 2008, with a subtitled script book.

In late December 2009, commenting the opportunity of a western release, Sega Australia managing director Darren Macbeth said there were no plans at the time for a potential "Yakuza Kenzan" release, as they were focusing on the release of Yakuza 3 at the time.

In 2019, then-producer of the series, Daisuke Sato, commented that due to its age as an early PS3 game, releasing a simple HD remaster as with Yakuza 3-5 (which were re-released as The Yakuza Remastered Collection) would make players today feel like something is missing, and as a result, Kenzan! would be suitable for a remake similar to Yakuza Kiwami and Yakuza Kiwami 2.

Though a Western release has yet to happen, the Western release of Like a Dragon: Ishin! in 2023 (a remake of the Japan-exclusive Ishin! which released originally in 2014) has led to an increased speculation about a Western release of Kenzan!. In response, executive producer Masayoshi Yokoyama and chief producer Hiroyuki Sakamoto stated that there was not enough demand for it, and a remake would have to be built from the ground up for the current generation of consoles.

=== Soundtrack ===
The Ryu Ga Gotoku Kenzan! Original Sound Track (HCV-381) album was published by Wave Master in Japan on March 6, 2008. The music was composed by Hidenori Shoji, Hideki Sakamoto, Hiroyoshi Kato, Keisuke Ito and Yuri Fukuda, with additional cutscene music by Hideki Naganuma.

The game also features two songs by Japanese hip hop artists Zeebra and Ketsumeishi; Zeebra collaborated later with the Yakuza 4 opening theme, "Butterfly City".

- Opening theme: Bushido by Zeebra. Released in Japan by Pony Canyon (PCCA-02642) as a dual-disc single on March 5, 2008. First disc is a CD including the title track and an instrumental version plus a B-side Lyrical Gunman (Three Gunz Up Remix) featuring Rudebwoy Face and Chappa Ranks. Second disc is a bonus DVD with the music video for Bushido which includes cutscene footages from the game.
- Closing theme: Life is Beautiful (ライフイズビューティフル, Raifu Izu Byutifuru) by Ketsumeishi from their 2007 album Ketsupolis 5 published in Japan by Toy's Factory.

== Marketing ==
=== Licensed products ===
Clothes manufacturer Cropped Heads collaborated with Sega to produce licensed Ryu Ga Gotoku Kenzan! tee-shirts, and Ace Cook produced Ryu Ga Gotoku Kenzan! cup noodles.

== Reception ==
Within four days of its release in Japan, Ryū ga Gotoku Kenzan! sold 177,897 copies. As of March 31, 2008, it sold 282,800 copies. As a best seller in Japan, the game received a budget re-release under the PlayStation 3 the Best bargain collection on December 11, 2008. It reached lifetime sales of 387,148 in Japan.

It earned the Award for Excellence at the Japan Game Awards 2008, and the Japanese video game magazine Famitsu reviewed it 37/40.
