= SpikeOut =

1998 video game

Spikeout
- Developer: Amusement Vision
- Publisher: Sega
- Director: Toshihiro Nagoshi
- Producer: Toshihiro Nagoshi
- Designer: Junichi Yamada
- Programmer: Tetsuya Kaku
- Artist: Toshihiro Nagoshi
- Composers: Shunsuke Suzuki; Hidenori Shoji
- Platform: Arcade
- Release: JP: September 1998; NA: October 1998; UK: December 1998; JP: January 1999 (Final Ed)
- Genre: Beat 'em up
- Arcade system: Sega Model 3 Step 2.1; Sega NAOMI

Spikeout: Digital Battle Online is a 3D beat 'em up video game developed by Toshihiro Nagoshi, and released by Sega for their Model 3 Step 2.1 arcade system board in 1998. An update, Spikeout: Final Edition, was released in 1999.

A follow-up, Slashout, which was a slash 'em up set in a medieval fantasy setting, was developed and released in 2000, also for arcades. A spinoff, Spikers Battle, adding a versus fighting element, was developed and released in 2001, again for arcades. Another follow-up, Spikeout: Battle Street, was developed by Dimps and released exclusively for the Xbox in 2005. A new port of Spikeout: Final Edition is included in the 2024 release of Like a Dragon: Infinite Wealth and 2025's Like a Dragon: Pirate Yakuza in Hawaii.

== Development ==
In a 2004 interview, Toshihiro Nagoshi said a Dreamcast version was not pursued because the hardware lacked sufficient performance. When Sega announced the Xbox version, GameSpot reported that the company viewed the platform as best suited to a faithful console port.

== Reception ==
In Japan, Game Machine listed SpikeOut on their November 15, 1998 issue as being the third most-successful arcade game of the month.
