= Like a Dragon: Pirate Yakuza in Hawaii =

2025 video game

- Developer: Ryu Ga Gotoku Studio
- Publisher: Sega
- Director: Yasuaki Uehara
- Producers: Ryosuke Horii; Hiroyuki Sakamoto
- Designer: Takanori Naganuma
- Programmer: Yutaka Ito
- Artists: Yuu Honya; Nobuaki Mitake
- Writer: Tsuyoshi Furuta
- Composer: Saori Yoshida (Note: Saori Yoshida served as the game's music director, directing other composers Keitarou Hanada, Yuri Fukuda, Ryo Fukuda, Takenobu Mitsuyoshi, Kenichi Tokoi, Mitsuharu Fukuyama, Hideaki Kobayashi, Kenji Mizuno, Etsuko Shimada, and Chihiro Aoki.)
- Series: Like a Dragon
- Platforms: PlayStation 4; PlayStation 5; Windows; Xbox One; Xbox Series X/S
- Release: February 21, 2025
- Genres: Action-adventure, beat 'em up, hack and slash
- Mode: Single-player

Like a Dragon: Pirate Yakuza in Hawaii (Note: Known in Japan as Ryū ga Gotoku 8 Gaiden: Pirates in Hawaii (Japanese: 龍が如く８外伝 Pirates in Hawaii(パイレーツ イン ハワイ); lit. "Like a Dragon 8 Side Story: Pirates in Hawaii")) is a 2025 action-adventure game developed by Ryu Ga Gotoku Studio and published by Sega. It is a spin-off of the Like a Dragon series and takes place six months after the events of Like a Dragon: Infinite Wealth. It was released for PlayStation 4, PlayStation 5, Windows, Xbox One, and Xbox Series X/S on February 21, 2025.

The game follows series mainstay Goro Majima, who, after being stranded on an island and losing his memories, now leads his own pirate crew to discover a hidden treasure. Alongside the series' returning beat 'em up gameplay, the game features elements of naval warfare based on its piracy theme.

Pirate Yakuza in Hawaii received generally positive reviews from critics. It was followed in February 2026 by a remake of Yakuza 3 called Yakuza Kiwami 3 & Dark Ties.

== Gameplay ==
In Pirate Yakuza in Hawaii, players control Goro Majima as they explore four different locales: Rich Island, a remote island in close proximity to Hawaii; Madlantis, a secret island frequented by criminals and pirates; Nele Island, the base of the Palekana religious group; and Honolulu, previously featured as the main setting of Infinite Wealth.

Similar to older Like a Dragon titles, Pirate Yakuza in Hawaii utilizes a beat 'em up combat system. Majima has access to two fighting styles: Mad Dog, a speed-focused style; and Sea Dog, which allows Majima to wield dual cutlasses and pistols, as well as other pirate tools. A new addition to the combat system is the ability to jump and perform mid-air combos.

Outside of regular combat and exploration, players can also assemble a pirate crew and upgrade their own ship, the Goromaru, which they can use to explore the sea and engage in combat with other pirate ships. Ship combat takes place in real-time, and players can board certain enemy ships after depleting their health to battle their crew and defeat their captain.

Pirate Yakuza in Hawaii features the return of several minigames from previous Like a Dragon titles, such as Karaoke, Crazy Delivery, and Dragon Kart. In addition, a new side activity, Masaru's Love Journey, focuses on Majima recruiting "Minato girls" to hang out with one of the game's characters, Masaru Fujita.

As with other Like a Dragon titles, Pirate Yakuza in Hawaii features unlockable emulations of older Sega games, such as the Master System and SG-1000 games Poseidon Wars 3-D, Space Harrier 3-D, Star Jacker, and the arcade game The Ocean Hunter.

== Synopsis ==
=== Premise ===
Like a Dragon: Pirate Yakuza in Hawaii takes place six months after the events of Like a Dragon: Infinite Wealth (2024), and features ex-Tojo Clan yakuza Goro Majima (Hidenari Ugaki/Matthew Mercer) as the sole playable character. Through unknown circumstances, Majima has been stranded on Rich Island, with no memories of his past life. After being saved by a local asthmatic boy named Noah Rich (First Summer Uika/Maya Aoki Tuttle), Majima finds himself embroiled in a new conflict, involving both local Hawaiian pirates and ex-yakuza members from Japan. He becomes the captain of a new pirate crew, and sets out in search of a hidden treasure, as well as to recover his memories.

In addition to Noah, Majima is joined by a new cast of characters, including: Jason Rich (Kenji Matsuda/Jeremy Brandt), Noah's father and a former treasure hunter who owns a bar on Rich Island; Masaru Fujita (Ryuji "Robert" Akiyama/Brent Mukai), a skilled chef who joins Majima's crew; Teruhiko Shigaki (Munetaka Aoki/Daisuke Tsuji), a former Tojo Clan patriarch who volunteered to clean up the pollution on Nele Island; Rodriguez (Ayumi Tanida/Josh Keaton), a disciple of the Palekana religious group; Mortimer (Shunsuke Daito/Matthew Waterson), a charismatic pirate who leads the Mortimer Armada; Moana Rich (Reina Ueda/Jennifer Sun Bell), Jason's middle daughter who helps him run the bar; Naomi Rich (Yoko Hikasa/Monique Burias Shi), Jason's oldest daughter who has an estranged relationship with him; Queen Michele (Romi Park/Debra Wilson), the ruler of Madlantis; Raymond Law (Miou Tanaka/Samoa Joe), the Pirate King who manages Madlantis' Pirate Coliseum; and Spade Tucker (Mugihito/Geoff Pierson), a New York loan shark who has knowledge of the hidden treasure. Returning characters from previous Like a Dragon titles include: Taiga Saejima (Rikiya Koyama/James Kirkland), Majima's sworn brother and fellow ex-yakuza; Nishida (Katsunori Okai/Brandon McInnis) and Daisaku Minami (Hideo Ishikawa/Mark Whitten), former members of Majima's yakuza family; and Ichiban Kasuga (Kazuhiro Nakaya/Kaiji Tang), an ex-yakuza who previously crossed paths with Majima.

=== Plot ===
In August 2024, Goro Majima awakens on Rich Island near Hawaii with no memory of his past. He rescues Noah Rich, a local boy with asthma, from pirates and meets Noah's father Jason, a retired treasure hunter who once sought the "Lost Treasure of the Esperanza"—a legendary hoard rumored to include an elixir that cures any disease. After defeating pirate leader Jack the Collector, Majima takes over his crew, recruits cook Masaru Fujita, and convinces Jason to join him and Noah in forming the Goro Pirates to search for the treasure on Nele Island.

On Nele Island, Majima is attacked by zealots of the Palekana cult, led by Rodriguez, but is saved by Teruhiko Shigaki, a former Tojo Clan patriarch. Shigaki explains that ex-yakuza now work legally to clean up the island and remove its radioactive waste storage, following a conspiracy involving the leaders of the Palekana and the Tojo Clan. (Note: As depicted in Like a Dragon: Infinite Wealth.) He also tells Majima that his sworn brother, Taiga Saejima, is coming to bring him back to Japan. Following yakuza ships, Majima sails to Madlantis, a pirate hub ruled by Queen Michele, where Jason's estranged daughter Naomi serves as her bodyguard. Masaru reveals that Spade Tucker, a New York moneylender, may know the location of the Esperanza treasure.

At Madlantis, Majima learns he has a bounty placed by Mortimer, a commodore who betrayed Jason years ago. After winning a coliseum battle, the Goro Pirates meet Michele, the Pirate King Raymond Law, Mortimer, and Naomi. Naomi secretly enlists Majima's help in finding a secret on Nele Island. When Noah is kidnapped by Palekana zealots, Majima rescues him and later meets Naomi in Honolulu. She confirms the treasure is buried on Nele Island and that Tucker is working with Shigaki to keep the island open. Confronting Shigaki, Majima learns he orchestrated Noah's kidnapping to delay Saejima and prevent interference. Shigaki repents and joins Majima's crew. Saejima soon arrives but clashes with Majima, refusing to let him stay; Majima defeats him.

Majima meets with Tucker, who produces a journal from a pirate who hid the Esperanza treasure in a cave on Nele Island. Rodriguez, revealed as the zealots' leader, attacks the yakuza settlement but later allies with Majima to stop Raymond, who plans to sell the treasure. To secure Tucker's passage, Majima defeats Mortimer in another coliseum fight; Mortimer is later killed by his own men. Masaru confesses he once accepted Raymond's bribe to sabotage Jason's ship but reconciles with Jason.

The Goro Pirates discover a cave near Nele Island and battle a giant squid responsible for Majima's amnesia, restoring his memory. Naomi reports to Michele, who sends her armada to seize the treasure. Raymond betrays and kills Michele, seizing control of Madlantis and kidnapping Jason's daughter Moana. In the ensuing conflict, Shigaki accidentally stabs Jason, who is taken to Honolulu by Tucker to seek medical aid. Regretful, Shigaki vows to help rescue Moana.

Majima, Saejima, and Naomi storm Madlantis, disable its defenses, and defeat Raymond, who is devoured by a white whale. The crew celebrates with Jason, now recovering, and agree to share the treasure, with Majima keeping only a photo as a keepsake. Six months later, Majima recounts his adventure while filming on a TV set with his subordinates Nishida and Daisaku Minami, as well as Ichiban Kasuga, while Noah visits him. On Rich Island, Jason and Masaru research the elixir, theorizing it is ambergris, while Rodriguez mourns his father's death. A flashback reveals Rodriguez's father, the last survivor of the Esperanza raid, lived unnaturally long thanks to ambergris and cast the remaining pieces into the sea.

In a post-credits scene, Majima and Saejima, back in Japan, muse about their journey, revealing that the former set out to find the elixir for their friend Kazuma Kiryu. They visit Kiryu in the hospital, preparing to recount their story.

== Development and promotion ==
Pirate Yakuza in Hawaii was developed as a standalone expansion to Infinite Wealth, following the success of the spin-off title Like a Dragon Gaiden: The Man Who Erased His Name. According to Ryu Ga Gotoku Studio's director Masayoshi Yokoyama, the concept of Gaiden was a gamble due to its more compact size and scale, but due to its positive reception, it allowed the team to develop the series more deeply. Yokoyama thought about writing a story depicting Goro Majima as a follow-up to Infinite Wealth, and chose the pirate angle as a way to do things differently than how the team usually did.

Development started shortly before the release of Infinite Wealth, and was first hinted at by Yokoyama in December 2023. Yokoyama estimated the main story to be 1.3-1.4 times larger than that of Gaiden, while the adventure section is much bigger due to the addition of new locations. Hawaii was chosen as a primary location as the team did not want to stop using the setting after just one game.

In May 2024, RGG Studio hosted a "Minato Girls" audition, similar to past games' audition contests, where the winner(s) would be chosen to appear in the then-unannounced new Like a Dragon game, in addition to performing promotional activities. The final five winners were announced on July 19, 2024. During the same month, the studio confirmed that they would reveal their new game at Tokyo Game Show 2024.

In September 2024, RGG Studio hosted their RGG Summit 2024 livestream event, where they revealed Pirate Yakuza in Hawaii for the first time, introduced the game's voice cast, and talked about the combat system and new activities. In October 2024, the studio released a second trailer detailing the naval combat system, while also confirming a new release date of February 21, 2025, moved up a week from its original date. The English and Chinese voiceover dubbings were included in a launch day patch for the game.

== Reception ==
Reception

Aggregate scores
Aggregator	Score
Metacritic	PS5: 79/100; Win: 81/100; XSXS: 87/100
OpenCritic	84% recommend (Note: Based on 165 reviews)

Review scores
Publication	Score
Digital Trends	3/5
Eurogamer	4/5
Famitsu	36/40
Game Informer	8.5/10
GameSpot	7/10
GamesRadar+	4/5
Hardcore Gamer	4/5
IGN	8/10
NME	4/5
PC Gamer (US)	70/100
PCGamesN	9/10
PCMag	4/5
Push Square	7/10
Shacknews	8/10
TechRadar	4.5/5
Video Games Chronicle	3/5
VG247	5/5

Like a Dragon: Pirate Yakuza in Hawaii received "generally favorable" reviews from critics, according to the review aggregation website Metacritic. OpenCritic determined that 84% of critics recommended the game. In Japan, four critics from Famitsu gave the game a total score of 36 out of 40, with each critic awarding the game a 9 out of 10.

=== Awards ===
Year	Award	Category	Result	Ref.
2025	Japan Game Awards	Award for Excellence	Won	
