= Like a Dragon Gaiden: The Man Who Erased His Name =

2023 video game

- Developer: Ryu Ga Gotoku Studio
- Publisher: Sega
- Director: Ryosuke Horii
- Producers: Hiroyuki Sakamoto; Makoto Suzuki
- Designers: Jun Orihara; Daisuke Takahashi
- Programmer: Yutaka Ito
- Artists: Daishi Kanaya; Nobuaki Mitake
- Writers: Tsuyoshi Furuta; Masayoshi Yokoyama
- Composers: Chihiro Aoki; Yuri Fukuda; Keitarou Hanada; Saori Yoshida; Hideaki Kobayashi; Shunsuke Minami
- Series: Like a Dragon
- Platforms: PlayStation 4; PlayStation 5; Windows; Xbox One; Xbox Series X/S
- Release: November 9, 2023
- Genre: Action-adventure
- Mode: Single-player

Like a Dragon Gaiden: The Man Who Erased His Name (Note: Known in Japan as Ryū ga Gotoku 7 Gaiden: Na wo Keshita Otoko (Japanese: 龍が如く７外伝 名を消した男; lit. "Like a Dragon 7 Side Story: The Man Who Erased His Name")) is a 2023 action-adventure game developed by Ryu Ga Gotoku Studio and published by Sega. It is a spin-off of the Like a Dragon series. Taking place during the events of Yakuza: Like a Dragon (2020), Like a Dragon Gaiden focuses on the series' original protagonist, Kazuma Kiryu, as he embarks on a new adventure in Osaka under the guise of a secret agent.

The game was conceived to expand further on Kiryu's backstory between the events of Yakuza: Like a Dragon and its 2024 sequel, Like a Dragon: Infinite Wealth. As such, the story of the game follows from Yakuza 6: The Song of Life then merges with the storyline of Yakuza: Like a Dragon. While the game introduces new characters, various characters from other Like a Dragon games and spin-offs appear as side characters. The spin-off also incorporates allusions to other Like a Dragon games, such as Yakuza and Yakuza 5.

Like a Dragon Gaiden was released for PlayStation 4, PlayStation 5, Windows, Xbox One, and Xbox Series X/S on November 9, 2023 and received generally positive reviews from critics.

== Gameplay ==
In Like a Dragon Gaiden: The Man Who Erased His Name, players control Kazuma Kiryu for parts of the game that take place in the Sotenbori district of Osaka. The Isezaki Ijincho district of Yokohama, a location prominently featured in Yakuza: Like a Dragon and Lost Judgment, is also partially available during the first chapter of the story. A third location, known as the Castle, is a hub area where players can participate in side activities. Minigames such as karaoke, Pocket Circuit racing, cabaret club, and fighting arena also return. A new character named Akame acts as an informant, providing Kiryu with sub-missions.

Kiryu has access to two fighting styles, Yakuza and Agent. The Yakuza style features aggressive brawler combat movement similar to Kiryu's classic fighting style from previous games, while the Agent style is described as having "absolute speed and precision", relying on high-tech gadgets.

Similar to Lost Judgment, Like a Dragon Gaiden features several Master System games which Kiryu can play: Alex Kidd in Miracle World, Alien Syndrome, Enduro Racer, Fantasy Zone, Fantasy Zone II: The Tears of Opa-Opa, Galaxy Force, Global Defense, Maze Hunter 3-D, Penguin Land, Quartet and Secret Command, as well the SG-1000 version of Flicky, among other arcade titles, such as Virtua Fighter 2, Sonic the Fighters, Motor Raid, Daytona USA 2 (renamed Sega Racing Classic 2 due to licensing issues) and Fighting Vipers 2. Like a Dragon Gaiden was the first time Sega Model 3 games have been emulated in an official Sega game.

Like a Dragon Gaiden features a special trial version of Like a Dragon: Infinite Wealth, which is unlockable after beating Gaiden's main story for the first time. The trial includes two demos: a "Story Demo", which continues from the end of Gaiden and features exclusive scenes not included in Infinite Wealth; and a "Hawaii Demo", which features a limited free-roam map of a fictionalized version of Honolulu, Hawaii for the players to explore and engage in side activities.

== Plot ==
=== Characters and settings ===
Like a Dragon Gaiden: The Man Who Erased His Name takes place after Yakuza 6: The Song of Life and concurrently with the events of Yakuza: Like a Dragon, serving as a prologue to Like a Dragon: Infinite Wealth. Following the ending of Yakuza 6, Kazuma Kiryu (Takaya Kuroda/Yong Yea) has faked his death and gone into hiding, in order to protect his foster children. Having signed a pact with the Daidoji faction to become their disciple, Kiryu now operates as one of their secret agents, codenamed "Joryu". However, after one of his missions go awry, Kiryu would soon be drawn into a new conflict as he is forced out of hiding by a mysterious figure.

New characters introduced in Like a Dragon Gaiden include: Kihei Hanawa (Hiroki Tōchi/Jake Eberle), a handler of the Daidoji faction; Homare Nishitani III (Kim Jae-wook/Tyler Yamabe), patriarch of the Kijin Clan, a subsidiary of the Osaka-based yakuza organization Omi Alliance; (Note: Nishitani's name is a title, inherited from the first Kijin Clan patriarch, who previously appeared in Yakuza 0.) Kosei Shishido (Yasukaze Motomiya/Matt Bushell) and Yuki Tsuruno (Yoshiyuki Yamaguchi/Eugene Nomura), respectively lieutenant and captain of the Omi Alliance's Watase Family; Akame (First Summer Uika/Holly Chou), an informant residing in Sotenbori; Yoshimura (Mitsuaki Kanuka/Alain Uy), a ruthless Daidoji faction manager who has contempt for Kiryu; the head priest of the Daidoji Temple (Ikkyu Juku/Kirk Thornton), one of the few people Kiryu confides in within the Daidoji faction; and the Boss (Hiroshi Naka/SungWon Cho), a mysterious high-ranking Daidoji officer operating the faction from the shadows.

Several characters from previous Like a Dragon titles return in Like a Dragon Gaiden, including: Masaru Watase (Rintarō Nishi/James C. Burns), patriarch of the Watase Family and captain of the Omi Alliance; Daigo Dojima (Satoshi Tokushige/Tim Friedlander), sixth chairman of the Tojo Clan; Goro Majima (Hidenari Ugaki/Matthew Mercer) and Taiga Saejima (Rikiya Koyama/Ron Yuan), senior Tojo Clan officers who accompany Daigo; and Ichiban Kasuga (Kazuhiro Nakaya/Kaiji Tang), a former Tojo Clan yakuza who would eventually become acquainted with Kiryu.

=== Synopsis ===
After faking his death in late 2016, (Note: As depicted in Yakuza 6: The Song of Life.) Kazuma Kiryu continues to live in secrecy, operating as an agent for the Daidoji faction under the codename "Joryu". He undertakes various tasks for the Daidoji via orders from his handler Kihei Hanawa, in exchange for anonymous funding to the Morning Glory Orphanage. Outside of his job, he spends time meditating in a Buddhist temple with the help of its head priest, it being a Daidoji front.

In 2019, Kiryu is tasked with providing security for a smuggling operation in Yokohama. The operation turns out to be a trap, as an unidentified yakuza group ambushes the agents and attempts to kidnap Hanawa. Kiryu manages to drive the yakuza away, though one of them recognizes him. The next day, Kiryu investigates the local Seiryu Clan in Isezaki Ijincho, but soon discovers that it was the Omi Alliance's Watase Family who ambushed the Daidoji agents. A group of Watase Family members, led by their captain Yuki Tsuruno and lieutenant Kosei Shishido, corners Kiryu, then kidnaps Hanawa when he refuses to comply. Kiryu is reprimanded by Daidoji manager Yoshimura, who suggests that they abandon Hanawa to maintain the Daidoji's secrecy. Kiryu refuses and, with the help of the head priest, escapes after defeating Yoshimura and several other agents.

Kiryu meets with Tsuruno in a bar in Ijincho, where the latter reveals that his patriarch, Masaru Watase, has requested his men to investigate Kiryu's supposed death since 2016, believing it to be fabricated. Tsuruno asks Kiryu to cooperate with the Watase Family in exchange for freeing him from the Daidoji and allowing him to re-fake his death and reunite with his foster children in Okinawa. Tsuruno sends Kiryu to Sotenbori, Osaka to meet with local fixer Akame. After helping Akame with a few of her jobs, she takes Kiryu to the Castle, a secret adult entertainment hub located on a ship outside of Sotenbori governed by the Omi Alliance's Kijin Clan. At the Castle, Kiryu signs up to fight in the Coliseum arena to prove his worth to Shishido, who then reveals Hanawa's location to Kiryu. Kiryu returns to Sotenbori, confronts Tsuruno and other Watase Family members, and frees Hanawa after defeating them.

Tsuruno reveals Watase's true intentions for requesting Kiryu's help: to oversee the dissolution of the Omi Alliance and the Tojo Clan, alongside the Tojo's sixth chairman Daigo Dojima. (Note: As depicted in Yakuza: Like a Dragon.) In spite of this revelation, Kiryu refuses to help them and leaves Tsuruno to the Daidoji. Kiryu later visits a Daidoji hideout in Sotenbori, where he is ordered by the Boss, a high-ranking Daidoji officer, to kill Tsuruno, Watase, and the rest of the Watase Family to maintain his cover. Kiryu holds Hanawa at gunpoint, allowing Tsuruno to escape. Hanawa threatens to harm the children at Okinawa, forcing Kiryu to surrender. Three days later, after a lengthy trial to test Kiryu and Hanawa's bond, the Boss lets go of Kiryu, with Tsuruno revealing to have made a deal with the Daidoji to lend Kiryu's services to the Watase Family.

Tsuruno later calls Kiryu to come to the Castle, where he reveals his intention: to lure out the Kijin Clan patriarch, Homare Nishitani III, from the Castle and kill him in time before Watase is released from prison, to ensure no high-ranking officers of the Omi Alliance rally the members to rebel against the dissolution. Kiryu, rejecting the proposal, strikes a deal to incapacitate him instead. Nishitani, having an interest in Kiryu, puts the Castle on lockdown. Kiryu is forced to punch Tsuruno to maintain the latter's cover and escape, knocking down Nishitani in the process. Later, Nishitani sends the Kijin Clan to find Kiryu in Sotenbori. Under Hanawa's advice, Kiryu and Tsuruno decide to mobilize the Watase Family to take over the Castle by force and leak its existence to the media. Having angered Nishitani enough, the two agree to a showdown in Nishitani's hideout on a shipyard outside Sotenbori. Kiryu and Shishido battle Nishitani and his goons while Tsuruno sets the hideout on fire. Nishitani is incapacitated, but Shishido, under orders from Tsuruno, stabs Nishitani to death before they can escape the building.

Several days later, Kiryu and the Watase Family arrive at a construction site outside Sotenbori to greet the recently released Watase. Shishido betrays the crew, having planned all along to stop the dissolution and take over the Omi Alliance. He rallies the Watase Family against Kiryu, Tsuruno, and Watase, and reveals that he faked Nishitani's stabbing. The three manage to fend off the attack, albeit Tsuruno and Watase are injured in the process. Hanawa, having been tipped off by Akame about Nishitani's survival, runs over Nishitani with a limo, leaving him unconscious. Hanawa escorts Kiryu, Tsuruno, and Watase to the meeting at the Omi Alliance HQ, where the latter announces the joint dissolution of the Omi Alliance and the Tojo Clan alongside Daigo. A riot breaks out in the process, and Tsuruno and Kiryu team up with Ichiban Kasuga and his friends, as well as Tojo Clan officers Goro Majima and Taiga Saejima, to protect Watase and Daigo. As Watase is escorted outside, Shishido, having survived the earlier battle, arrives, rallying the remaining Omi Alliance members. Daigo, Majima and Saejima fend off against the last of the Omi Alliance, while Kiryu confronts Shishido alone and defeats him. The latter is ultimately subdued by Yoshimura, who decides to keep him alive as a potential Daidoji agent, alongside Nishitani.

In 2020, Hanawa reveals that the Daidoji wants to reward Kiryu for his efforts in helping Watase, as well as aiding Kasuga in stopping the Tokyo Governor Ryo Aoki. The former shares a recording of a hidden camera overlooking Kiryu's grave, where two of his adopted children, Taichi and Ayako, update Kiryu on everyone at the Morning Glory Orphanage. Hanawa also shows a picture of a drawing by Haruka Sawamura's son, Haruto, causing Kiryu to break down in tears. Kiryu is then told by the head priest that he's allowed to go on a vacation, provided he maintains his cover. Hanawa informs Kiryu of his new alias, Taichi Suzuki, then bids him farewell.

In a post-credits scene, three years later, Kiryu enters Nanala Hill Church in Honolulu, Hawaii, and leaves a ring on the altar as a parting gift to his late girlfriend, Yumi Sawamura.

== Development and promotion ==
Like a Dragon Gaiden: The Man Who Erased His Name was originally conceived during the development of Like a Dragon: Infinite Wealth. Ryu Ga Gotoku Studio director Masayoshi Yokoyama suggested to the development team to expand further on Kazuma Kiryu's backstory in between the events of the prior titles, rather than restricting to an interlude for Infinite Wealth. It was discussed that the project be done in downloadable content format, before eventually evolving into a full game. The game was developed in parallel with Infinite Wealth and Like a Dragon: Ishin!, and was finished within six months.

Like a Dragon Gaiden was announced in September 2022 during RGG Studio's Summit livestream, alongside a debut cinematic trailer. Yokoyama explained that the game would be shorter in length compared to usual mainline entries. Gaiden's playtime was roughly estimated to be 10–20 hours, while Yokoyama promised that there would be an ample amount of activities for players to do.

In early 2023, RGG Studio hosted a Cabaret Club Grand Prix competition, in which five models were chosen to appear as live-action hostesses in the cabaret club minigame in Like a Dragon Gaiden, while the Grand Prix winner is given an in-game role in Infinite Wealth. Among the five finalists, the livestreamer and VTuber Kson ultimately won the Grand Prix.

The first story trailer premiered at Summer Game Fest 2023, showcasing new characters as well as gameplay footage of the new Agent fighting style, in addition to confirming the release date. Additional gameplay was shown at RGG Summit Summer 2023, alongside an introduction of the main cast members. In June 2023, RGG Studio revealed that Yong Yea would voice Kiryu in the English dub, replacing Darryl Kurylo who previously voiced Kiryu in Yakuza (2005) and Yakuza: Like a Dragon (2020).

The second story trailer premiered in August 2023, showcasing more characters in the story, including returning characters from previous Like a Dragon titles, in addition to a first-look at the various minigames. In September 2023, RGG Studio revealed the main theme song for the game, "Katatoki", performed by singer Yojiro Noda and rapper JID. It was also announced that characters from the Judgment spinoff series would appear in the game as part of its side content.

Professional wrestling promotion All Elite Wrestling (AEW) held a "Like a Dragon Gaiden Street Fight" to promote the game on the November 15, 2023, episode of Dynamite, between the Golden Dragons of Dojima (The Golden Jets (Kenny Omega and "The Ocho" Chris Jericho), "The Golden Star" Kota Ibushi and "No More BS" Paul Wright), and the Don Callis Family (Mogul Embassy's "The Machine" Brian Cage, Konosuke Takeshita, Kyle Fletcher and Powerhouse Hobbs). Omega would win the match for his team by pinning Cage after he and Jericho taped up Hobbs to the ropes, allowing Ibushi to join AEW following the match. The game was advertised on the ring apron for that episode of Dynamite and the week beforehand.

== Release ==
Like a Dragon Gaiden: The Man Who Erased His Name was released worldwide for PlayStation 4, PlayStation 5, Windows, Xbox One, and Xbox Series X/S on November 9, 2023. The game also launched on Xbox Game Pass for cloud, console, and PC. A pre-order bonus downloadable content pack included recurring Like a Dragon characters Goro Majima, Taiga Saejima, and Daigo Dojima as additional characters for the Arena minigame. Like a Dragon Gaiden released digitally, with only a limited physical edition available in select Asian territories. Unlike recent releases, Gaiden's English dub was not included at launch, and instead was added via an update on December 14, 2023.

== Reception ==
Reception

Aggregate scores
Aggregator	Score
Metacritic	(PC) 78/100 (PS5) 78/100 (XSXS) 79/100
OpenCritic	81% recommend (Note: Based on 118 reviews)

Review scores
Publication	Score
Destructoid	8/10
Digital Trends	3/5
Famitsu	35/40
Game Informer	8/10
GameSpot	8/10
GamesRadar+	3/5
IGN	7/10
PC Gamer (US)	70/100
Push Square	8/10
RPGFan	72/100
Shacknews	9/10
VG247	5/5

Like a Dragon Gaiden: The Man Who Erased His Name received "generally favorable" reviews from critics, according to review aggregator website Metacritic. In Japan, four critics from Famitsu gave the game a total score of 35 out of 40.

VG247 gave praise to the improvement in narrative approach, the shorter but more focused story, as well as the introduction of the Agent combat style that shakes up the gameplay formula. In a mixed review, Digital Trends praised the character writing but criticized the use of repetitive plot points. They also criticized the tedious nature of the game's side mission system, compared to previous Like a Dragon titles. The game won the Award for Excellence at the Japan Game Awards 2024.

=== Sales ===
The PlayStation 5 version of Like a Dragon Gaiden sold 63,319 physical units within its first week of release in Japan, making it the second best-selling retail game of the week in the country. The PlayStation 4 version sold 60,134 physical units in Japan throughout the same week, making it the country's third best-selling retail game of the week.

By June 2025, Like a Dragon Gaiden had been revealed to have sold 960,000 units.
