= Kazuma Kiryu =

Fictional character in the Yakuza video game series

- Yakuza / Like a Dragon character
- Kazuma Kiryu in his classic design as seen in the remake Yakuza Kiwami (2016)
- First game: Yakuza (2005)
- Voiced by: Japanese: Takaya Kuroda Kenji Nojima (Child); English: Darryl Kurylo (2005-2020); Yong Yea (2023–present); Aleks Le (2024, Amazon Prime TV Series, Dub); Topher Ngo (2025–present, singing voice)
- Portrayed by: Various: Masakatsu Funaki (Like a Dragon: Prologue); Kazuki Kitamura (Like a Dragon); Eiji Takigawa (Ryu ga Gotoku stage play); Ryoma Takeuchi (Amazon Prime TV series); Yasukaze Motomiya (Yakuza Powered By Nihon Touitsu)

In-universe information
- Nationality: Japanese

Kazuma Kiryu (Japanese: 桐生 一馬, Hepburn: Kiryū Kazuma) is a character and the initial main protagonist of Sega's action-adventure beat 'em up Japanese role-playing game franchise Yakuza / Like a Dragon. He is popularly known as "the Dragon of Dojima" (堂島の龍, Dōjima no Ryū) due to the tattoo of a dragon on his back and him originally being a fearsome member of the yakuza group known as the Dojima Family, a subsidiary of the Tojo Clan.

Kiryu was introduced in the series' 2005 debut game, where he took the blame for his boss's death to protect his sworn-brother Akira Nishikiyama, resulting in his expulsion from the clan and a ten-year stay in prison. After leaving prison, he fights against the new threats in his life, during which he meets Haruka Sawamura, to whom he eventually becomes an adoptive father.

Kiryu is voiced by Takaya Kuroda in Japanese and by Darryl Kurylo (2005, 2020) and Yong Yea (2023–present) in the series' English-dubbed releases. Besides the main series, Kiryu has also appeared in three live-action Like a Dragon projects: two films and a television series, as well as other video games including Project X Zone 2 and as downloadable content in the spin-off game, Fist of the North Star: Lost Paradise.

Sega producer Toshihiro Nagoshi stated he was created to appeal to a broad audience. Kiryu was the sole playable character for the first three games; in the next three, additional playable characters are included, causing him to take on a smaller role. He was once again the sole playable character in the series' seventh main installment, Yakuza 6: The Song of Life. The eighth installment, Yakuza: Like a Dragon, stars a new protagonist, Ichiban Kasuga, though Kiryu makes an appearance as a supporting character. Kiryu returns as the main protagonist in the spinoff title Like a Dragon Gaiden: The Man Who Erased His Name, and is one of the two main protagonists, alongside Kasuga, in Like a Dragon: Infinite Wealth, which would be his final journey as he now has cancer and has merely months to live.

Critical reception to Kiryu has been generally positive. Several critics have praised how Kiryu, despite his history as a yakuza, stood out because of his kindness and character development across the series' story.

== Creation and development ==
=== Concept ===
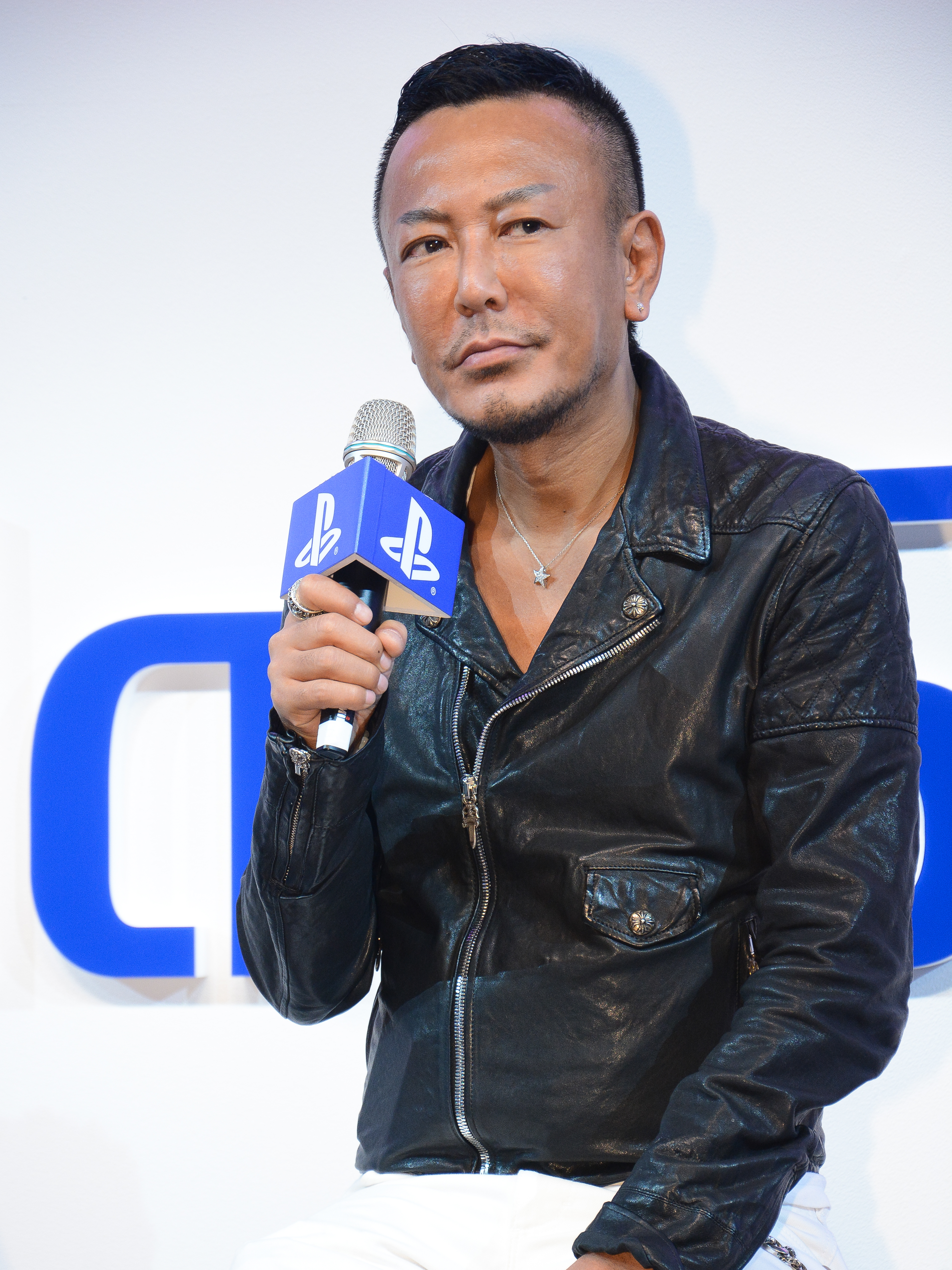
Toshihiro Nagoshi's development team created Kazuma Kiryu with Hasei Seishu's aid.

In creating Kazuma Kiryu, there were some issues regarding how realistic his position and age were. Scenario editor Hase Seishu told the staff the positions were too high for his age and thus Kiryu's age was revised. When describing Kiryu, the staff found his position would be of the noble samurai type who would often protect others. Although Kiryu is the player character for Yakuza, Nagoshi refrained from calling him the protagonist as the narrative was focused on the character Haruka Sawamura who has a character arc instead in the game. The same basis was used for Yakuza 2 where the narrative focuses more on the new character Kaoru Sayama rather than Kiryu. In localizing the games, the character was often referred to by his first name, but by Yakuza 4, producer Yasuhiro Noguchi made him most commonly called Kiryu in an attempt to make him fit with the other main characters also called by their last names. Kiryu was made to be a modern version of a typical Japanese hero. He was conceived as strong samurai-like character, inspired by the main characters in traditional Japanese "Ninkyo" movies.

=== Personality and development ===
Nagoshi believed that the tale of Kazuma Kiryu had yet to be completed following the release of the second game. As a result, he had Kiryu and Haruka trying to live a "more 'human' life" throughout Yakuza 3. For this game Nagoshi stated Kiryu was highly different from an iconic hero as a result of the way he enjoys his life. Furthermore, Nagoshi said this difference is shown across the series. Nagoshi thanked staff member and series writer Masayoshi Yokoyama that the team could further develop Kiryu's appeal across the franchise. The inclusion of Kiryu running an orphanage for Yakuza 3 was enjoyed by Yokoyama despite rewriting this subplot multiple times. Originally, Kiryu was meant to go to prison once again but because it was going to be obvious they changed his story in this game. Due to Kiryu taking care of the orphans, Yokoyama feared the character became too kind. Initially, there were issues within the Sega staff with regard to how Kiryu would act in the game. Designer Ryosuke Horii came up with the idea of expanding the idea of minigames to the point where the character would do karaoke or go fishing if the player wanted. This was discouraged by Sega as it would be out of character for Kiryu, especially his actor. Horii defended his idea as Kiryu had been viewed as a permanently frowning man and by doing these minigames, Kiryu would come across as a cooler character. Soon Horii's idea was approved by Nagoshi among other members of the team at least as a try.

Across all these games, the development team developed a sturdy understanding of his personality, and there was a lot of effort put into making the character attractive to the audiences as a result of being the only playable character. By Yakuza 4, Kiryu was seen as "indestructible" by the staff, and as a result, he was made the last character playable in the game, following three new characters that stood out thanks to their different traits. For Yakuza 5, while once again there were other protagonists alongside Kiryu, a new one, Haruka, was added as playable for the first time in order to make her character arc connect with the role of Kiryu and the other characters. Kiryu was made into a taxi driver but in a new city where he is not known by other people, this was done by the staff as they thought it would be the best choice for him.

For the prequel Yakuza 0 Sega wanted to make Goro Majima stand out from Kiryu as in this title the two share the role of protagonists. Sega described Kiryu as a "straight man trait – tough but honorable and keeps to himself a bit" implying there are not too many difficulties in writing him. Through this game and the remake of the first game, Kiwami, the relationship between Kiryu and Majima is explored more deeply in contrast to the initial game of the franchise, most notably because of the changes made to Majima's characterization and the way he sees Kiryu's actions, while being both friends and enemies at the same time. Yakuza 0 also served as a story of Kiryu that Sega wanted players to know before reaching Yakuza 6. Kiryu's traits in Yakuza 0 were specifically changed to a "loose-cannon hot-head" to the point where long-time fans would be surprised by his actions. However, chief producer and writer Masayoshi Yokoyama stated the character would mature across the storyline. Despite Kiryu's fame, developer Daisuke Sato noted that players ended up enjoying Majima far more in the franchise.

After several appearances, the classic Kiryu was redesigned for Infinite Wealth.

During development of Yakuza 4, the staff started wondering how they would end Kiryu's story as, unlike other video game characters, he did not possess supernatural powers. They compared the character with James Bond whose actor changed multiple times across his movies. Describing him as "a super-cool and masculine guy, but since he's a well-established character with a specific personality, there are things that he would and wouldn't do", the team decided he would need a successor who would bring the staff more creativity to work with. In late 2016, Nagoshi claimed he had been doing Kazuma's story for nearly a decade, stating "it had its pros and cons". He concluded by saying "I also think that's a way to give back to Kazuma Kiryu. Sooner or later, I want to announce something different." In April 2017 Sega confirmed that while Yakuza 6 would end Kiryu's story, the series would still go on. Deciding to bring the last tale of Kiryu with Yakuza 6, the staff wanted to make the game as appealing as possible. The game focuses on the family relationship between Kiryu and Haruka after years of being separated.

Although Ichiban Kasuga replaces in Kiryu in Like a Dragon, Sega used him in such game as a minor character with an untold backstory in regards to his current whereabouts that is explained in Gaiden. Kiryu was not planned to return in those games but it was collective decision within the development team on reusing the character. His return lead him to become Kasuga's superior but he was noted to keep his original personality rather than have a significant development. In Infinite Wealth, Kiryu's haircut was redesigned. Sakamoto think they have seen throughout the series that Kiryu's attire often represents him, and even his iconic suit has a meaning behind it and is never done without purpose. The new design was made to represent Kiryu's lower health as he has lost weight and shows notable signs of aging.

In retrospect, Kiryu's Yakuza 3 persona received negative response with Yokoyama addressing his poor clothing, obese looking appearance and sideburns. As a result, Kiryu was redesigned for Yakuza 3 Kiwami were is portrayed as more slim and with a different sense of fashion. His relationship with Rikiya was changed specifically with how he befriends his boss after a fight.

=== Voice actors ===
Nagoshi was impressed by Kiryu's Japanese voice actor, Takaya Kuroda, due to how he sang in the music minigame. Another staff member, Sato, was impressed by the karaoke game as it helped to show a fun side of Kiryu. Kuroda highly enjoyed voicing his character, being anxious in most scenes regardless of the tone he had to make. As a result, he wanted to keep Kiryu in character. Kuroda described Kiryu as a true shy character, stating he does not consider himself too attractive to the point where he could not form a formal romantic relationship with Sayama in Yakuza 2. Kuroda was surprised with the success of the first Yakuza game and thus hoped the series would continue. Kuroda expressed joy with his work, recalling people who recognized his voice from the games.

Kiryu's first English voice actor Darryl Kurylo said that he wanted to sound as good as possible after being impressed by the characterization of Kiryu and the lines he had to give. However, he regrets some lines were lost in translation of the original game. Nevertheless, Kurylo enjoyed the experience to the point of playing the game multiple times alongside his son. In order to fit the lipsyncing from the original Japanese game, Kurylo often had to say a line in different styles. Kurylo had even more fun doing the yells for the fight scenes. After 15 years of the series not being localized alongside an English dub, Kurylo reprised his role as Kiryu in 2020's Yakuza: Like a Dragon.

Prior to the release of Like a Dragon: Infinite Wealth, Yong Yea was cast as the new English voice for Kiryu. According to Yea, he was originally a candidate for other roles but was personally chosen by Sega of America as the top choice to voice the series's initial protagonist. The reasoning behind this recast is unknown, but Yea was given Kurylo's blessing via Twitter to voice Kiryu, noting Yea's greater dedication to acting and cultural connection to the character. Yea expressed comfort with the Like a Dragon series's voice director, as he often provided aid to the actor in regards to what lines were more fitting for the character. Yea also took inspiration from Kuroda's performance. However, he still aimed to give his own take due to difficulties in adapting so many Japanese lines. Yea in particular was a fan of Kiryu's relationship with Nishikiyama in Yakuza 0 and Kiryu tells his sworn brother to keep fighting even if it meant killing him. Yea also liked the balance in Kiryu's personality as he is both heartwarming and stoic depending on the type of cutscene. He also looked forward to making appealing karaoke mini-games like Kuroda has done.

== Appearances ==
=== Yakuza ===
Kiryu is a famous member of the Tojo clan, who earned the nickname of "the Dragon of Dojima". Early in the first game he was planning on starting his own subsidiary group until he takes the blame for the murder of his boss, Sohei Dojima, to protect his best friend, Akira Nishikiyama, and is imprisoned for ten years. After his release, Kiryu returns to his home town, Kamurocho, but due to his patricide he is marked for death by the entire yakuza community. Kiryu then learns that 10 billion yen has been stolen from the Tojo Clan. Soon after he meets a young girl called Haruka, whom seemingly every criminal group in the country is after. With the help of detective Date, Kiryu manages to learn the truth of the money. Upon reuniting with Yumi, his childhood love and Haruka's mother, he is confronted by Kyohei Jingu, Haruka's father, and the true owner of the money. After defeating Jingu, Kiryu is reunited with his old friend Nishiki. The two fight, with Kiryu coming out victorious. Jingu tries to shoot Kiryu but Yumi takes the bullet for him. Nishikiyama then kills himself with Jingu. After Yumi dies in Kiryu's arms, Kiryu subsequently decides to start a new, honest life with Haruka.

=== Yakuza 2 ===
In Yakuza 2, the fifth Chairman of the Tojo Clan, Yukio Terada, is assassinated and Kazuma Kiryu wants Sohei Dojima's son Daigo to take the clan's leadership and prevent an upcoming yakuza family war. While attempting to broker a peace deal between the Tojo and the Omi, Daigo and Jin Goda (the chairman of Omi) are kidnapped by Ryuji Goda, Jin's adopted son. Ryuji, through working with the Jingweon Mafia, attempts to destroy Kamurocho and Kiryu to be the only dragon in Japan. Kiryu is put under the protective custody of a female detective called Kaoru Sayama, who uses him to get close to the Tojo to discover her past. Eventually, Kiryu and Ryuji fight atop Kamurocho Hills. Kiryu is victorious, but Yukio Terada appears, revealing that he faked his own death to start a war and is really a Jingweon survivor. Terada is also defeated, but begs Kiryu to trust him. After Jin Goda, Takashima and Terada are dead, Kiryu and Ryuji have a final showdown, which Kiryu wins. A bomb Terada had triggered, but secretly removed the fuse from, fails to detonate, saving Kiryu and Kaoru's lives.

=== Yakuza 3 ===
For Yakuza 3 Kiryu leaves Kamurocho for Okinawa, where he now runs the Morning Glory (アサガオ) Orphanage. There he raises nine children, including Haruka. As time passes, Kiryu befriends the Ryudo Family from Okinawa despite initial conflicts over the Morning Glory's ownership. Kiryu is caught up in a government plot when Morning Glory's land is in the way of a proposed resort. Daigo is shot and falls into a coma; Nakahara is also attacked, and the deed to the orphanage is stolen by the brother of the late Shintaro Kazama. Date gives him information on the three most likely suspects for Kashiwagi's death: Yoshitaka Mine, a white-collar yakuza, Goh Hamazaki, a patriarch with ties to the triads, and Tsuyoshi Kanda, who has taken over the gang once controlled by Kiryu's sworn brother, Nishikiyama. The Military Base Expansion Bill is part of a CIA operation to eliminate a group of arms smugglers known as Black Monday, and the mystery assassin is Joji Kazama, Shintaro's younger brother who works for the CIA's Japanese division. In return for his help, Tamiya asks Kiryu to protect Toma, his former secretary, from a planned hit by Joji. Kiryu fights through his men to reach Daigo's hospital room, where he meets CIA operative Andre Richardson. Richardson explains that he has been using Mine as a way to gain access to what he believes to be an advanced missile defense system, unaware that it does not exist. Nevertheless, he prepares to finish off Kiryu. Daigo, having woken up from his coma, suddenly shoots him through the chest before Mine, in an act of self-sacrifice, throws himself and Richardson off the roof to their deaths.

=== Yakuza 4 ===
During Yakuza 4, Kiryu continues to run the orphanage. There, he and Haruka nurse a wounded prisoner, Taiga Saejima, washed ashore one day. Kiryu provides for him, allowing Saejima to return to the district upon his recovery. Sometime after Saejima leaves, Hamazaki washes ashore, warning Kiryu of a threat to the Tojo clan. Kiryu leaves and meets Saejima's sister, Yasuko, on their journey to Kamurocho to find his brother. There Kiryu witnesses Goro Majima being arrested and dragged away from Millennium Tower to police patrol cars. He chases her into the sewers, where Tanimura and Akiyama mistake him for a Ueno Seiwa Clan member and attack. After defeating them Kiryu chases Yasuko into Purgatory only to discover that she, along with Saejima, has been kidnapped by the Ueno Seiwa Clan. Kiryu speaks with Katsuragi and agrees to meet on the roof of Kamurocho Hills on the condition that he fights through the entire Ueno Seiwa Clan to get there. Once he does, he finds Yasuko and Saejima bound and gagged by Katsuragi. During the events that follow Yasuko is shot and kills Katsuragi before dying herself. Kiryu later fights Daigo Dojima on top of the Millennium Tower who was seeking money to run the Tojo Clan which was offered as bait by Akiyama. Following his defeat, Kiryu welcomes Saejima back into the Tojo Clan.

=== Yakuza 5 ===
In Yakuza 5, Kiryu has left the orphanage in Okinawa and becomes a taxi driver in Fukuoka under a false identity: Taichi Suzuki (鈴木 太一, Suzuki Taichi). When it is revealed that Daigo Dojima has gone missing, the truce between Tojo Clan and the Omi Alliance leads to a potential war. Kazuhiko Serizawa, an Osakan detective with the Organized Crimes Unit, warns Kiryu that he needs to meet with Omi Alliance Lieutenant Masaru Watase to prevent the war. Kiryu proposes he take on Aoyama's forces by himself to minimize bloodshed and is victorious. Before Aoyama can reveal his master's identity, he's shot in the head by Morinaga, who is part of the conspiracy. In Kamurocho, Kiryu learns of how the current war will affect the debut of Haruka's performance as an idol. At the Tojo Clan Headquarters, Kiryu learns that Aizawa is Kurosawa's son. Kurosawa wanted to leave Aizawa the entirety of the Tojo Clan and Omi Alliance as a legacy, but Aizawa is only interested in defeating Kiryu. A wounded Kiryu defeats Aizawa and reunites with Haruka.

=== Yakuza 0 ===
Set seventeen years before Yakuza, a 20-year-old Kiryu is framed for killing a civilian during a routine debt collection and must find the true killer before his mentor Shintaro Kazama is forced to take responsibility on his behalf. With the help of real estate agents Tetsu Tachibana and Jun Oda, Kiryu realizes that his situation was deliberately engineered by Sohei Dojima, who wished to remove the Kazama Family so that he could acquire the Empty Lot and gain supremacy over the Tojo Clan. They work to take over Kamurocho and protect the Empty Lot's owner, Makoto Makimura, who is also Tachibana's sister, from the bloodthirsty Dojima Family. After the Dojima Family admits defeat, Kiryu rejoins so that he could find purpose as a true yakuza. He also meets Goro Majima, his future rival, for the first time.

=== Yakuza 6: The Song of Life ===
In Yakuza 6: The Song of Life, Kiryu is imprisoned for three years. Once free, he learns Haruka is involved in a mysterious hit-and-run. Furthermore, Kiryu learns she is now a mother of an infant named Haruto and decides to take care of him until Haruka recovers from her coma. Finding out who is responsible takes Kiryu reluctantly back into the extrajudicial underbelly of Japan — Kamurocho, as well as a small fishing town near Hiroshima called Onomichi. There, Kiryu befriends the Yomei Alliance's Hirose family who know of Haruka but do not know of Haruto. During Kiryu's investigation, he learns that elements of the Tojo and Yomei Alliance have been secretly manipulating events behind the scenes in order to maintain "The Secret of Onimichi". Haruka's hit-and-run incident is later to be revealed as part of a retaliatory attack against the Yomei Alliance by the Kamurocho-based Saio Triad. Kiryu returns to Kamurocho with the Hirose's Tsuyoshi Nagumo and Yuta Usami, learning the child's father is a former member who hit Haruka. However, they find him dead and Hirose reveals that Yuta is the actual father, something he kept in secret due to him being the heir of the Saio Triad. Kiryu makes peace with Yuta but Hirose tries to kill him when revealing the secret of Onomichi, a hidden battle ship made since World War II developed by Iwami Shipbuilding, a company founded by the chairman of the Yomei Alliance. Tojo Clan advisor Katsumi Sugai and Iwami Shipbuilding CEO Tsuneo Iwami reveal themselves to be the masterminds behind the conflict, and in an attempt to halt Kiryu's interference, kidnap Haruka and Haruto. Kiryu's allies intervene, but Kiryu receives multiple injuries from Iwami and Sugai, with the latter attempting to shoot Haruka, Haruto, and Yuta before Kiryu is able to protect them at the last second, with him being shot instead. Afterwards, Kiryu fakes his death to protect Haruka and Haruto in exchange for keeping quiet on the secret of Onomichi. With Kiryu's apparent death, Haruka, Haruto, and Yuta start a new life at Morning Glory together.

=== Yakuza: Like a Dragon ===
While not its main protagonist, Kiryu appeared in Yakuza: Like a Dragon as a supporting character. His first appearance is stopping an Omi Alliance officer from attacking Masaru Watase shortly after his announcement of the Omi Alliance's disbandment. After Masumi Arakawa's death, Kiryu prevents protagonist Ichiban Kasuga from killing a man out of rage. He tells Kasuga that he has information regarding Ryo Aoki's next move, and that he would be waiting at Geomijul. After defeating Kasuga's party, Kiryu shares the information with him, disappearing shortly afterwards. He refuses to join Kasuga's party to uphold the deal he made with the Fixer's men, which he did to protect his family.

Upon defeating Amon in the post-game Final Millennium Tower dungeon, Kiryu expresses his approval of Kasuga – not as his successor, but as someone that could live his own life.

=== Like a Dragon Gaiden: The Man Who Erased His Name ===
Following the events of Yakuza 6, Kiryu became a disciple of the Daidoji faction, working for them as a secret agent, codenamed "Joryu" (淨龍). He resides in the Daidoji's temple, taking odd jobs while the faction anonymously supports the Morning Glory orphanage. In 2019, he is requested by his handler Kihei Hanawa to provide security for a smuggling operation in Yokohama. Unbeknownst to him, the operation is a trap set by the Watase Family in order to lure out Hanawa, who they deduced was related to Kiryu's disappearance. Under Hanawa's instructions, Kiryu investigates the Seiryu Clan in Yokohama, but he encounters men from the Watase Family, led by Captain Yuki Tsuruno, who requests his aid in overseeing the dissolution of the Tojo Clan and Omi Alliance. After facing opposition from higher-up Daidoji officers, Kiryu is eventually allowed to aid the Watase Family. Teaming up with his former Tojo allies as well as Ichiban Kasuga and his friends, Kiryu oversees the dissolution and prevents an all-out riot from Omi members. Months later, Kiryu is given an update on his foster children at Okinawa, and is given an indefinite vacation, while still being instructed to maintain his cover. Kiryu departs, and ends up in Hawaii in 2023, where he visits a local church and leaves the engagement ring he bought for Yumi several years back.

=== Like a Dragon: Infinite Wealth/Like a Dragon: Pirate Yakuza in Hawaii ===
In Infinite Wealth, Kiryu's fights are turn based unlike his other appearances. However, he unlocks an ability to fight in real time. While in Honolulu, Kiryu is given orders by the Daidoji to find Kasuga's biological mother, Akane Kishida, and teams up with Kasuga's party to protect her. Kiryu also reveals that he has contracted cancer and has just six months left to live, leading him to create a "bucket list" of things to do and people to reunite with before he dies. Kiryu and Kasuga ultimately stop a plan to lead ex-Yakuza to their deaths in a radioactive dumping ground but as it happens, Kiryu's death is revealed to the world as having been faked. Kiryu decides that life is still worth living, and though frail and weakened, attends hospital treatment, now able to freely use the name Kazuma Kiryu once more.

In Like a Dragon: Pirate Yakuza in Hawaii, Kiryu continues to receive hospital care a year after the events of Infinite Wealth, while receiving visits from Daigo, Majima, and Saejima. It is revealed that Majima, with the hope of allowing Kiryu to live longer, chased a rumour in Hawaii about an elixir of life that allows its consumer to extend their lifespan. While he was unable to obtain the elixir, Majima promises to tell Kiryu about his adventures as a pirate.

=== Other games ===
Outside the Yakuza / Like a Dragon series, Kiryu appears as a guest character via downloadable content in the Japanese versions of Binary Domain and Everybody's Golf 6. He is also a playable in Project X Zone 2 alongside Majima. In Fist of the North Star: Lost Paradise, a spin-off based on Fist of the North Star, Kiryu appears as a skin for Kenshiro via downloadable content. Kiryu also appears as an unlockable playable character in Super Monkey Ball Banana Mania.

In the 2024 PlayStation 5 game, Astro Bot, a "bot" version of Kiryu is able to be unlocked through gameplay. The "bot" version of Kiryu features Kiryu's iconic red shirt and grey suit as well as his hair style and facial hair, the bot Kiryu stands underneath a miniature version of the Kamurocho gate from the Yakuza games. Interacting with him will make the Kiryu bot drop a number of items from the series such as a dart board, traffic cone and golf club.

=== Other appearances ===
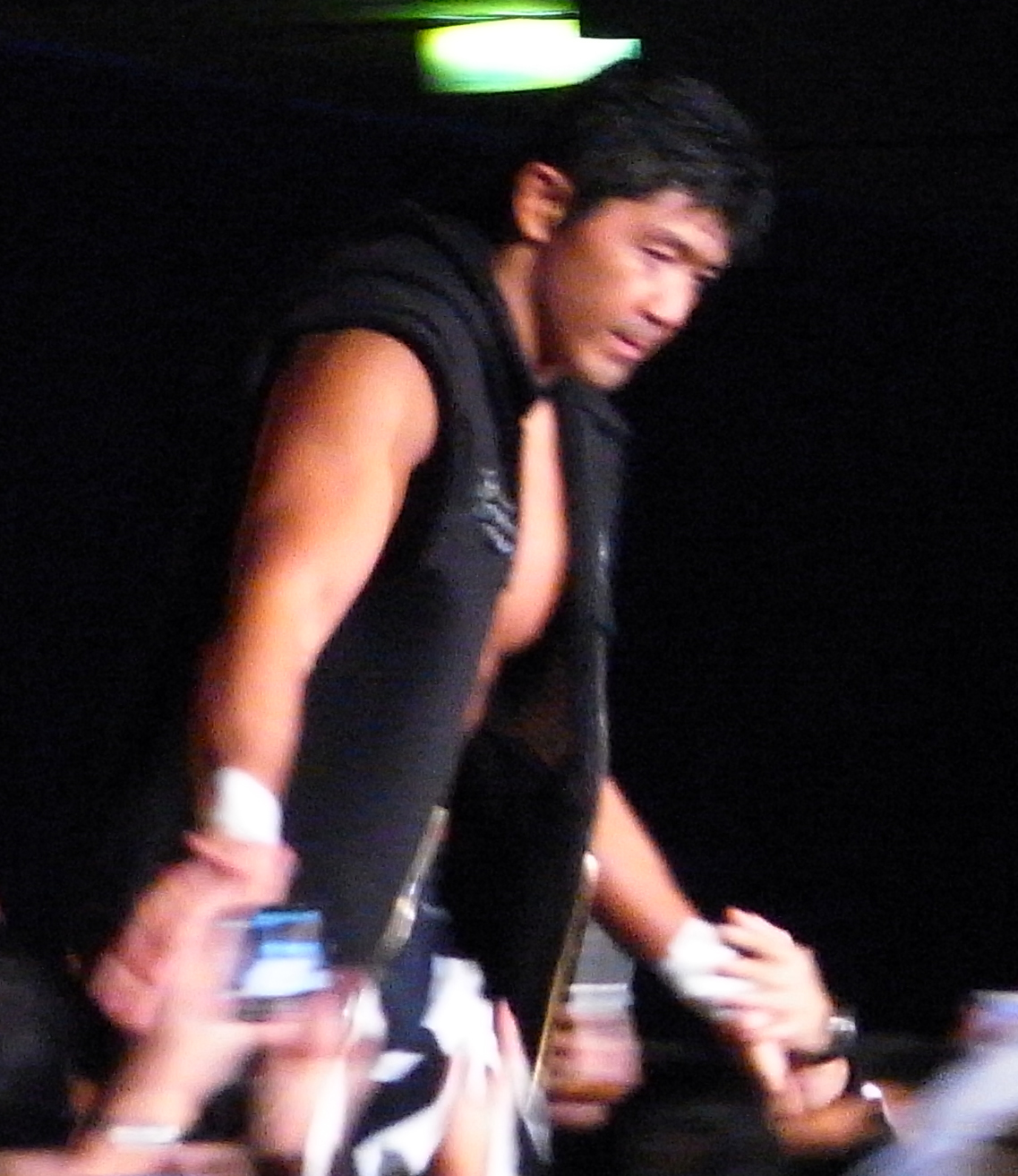
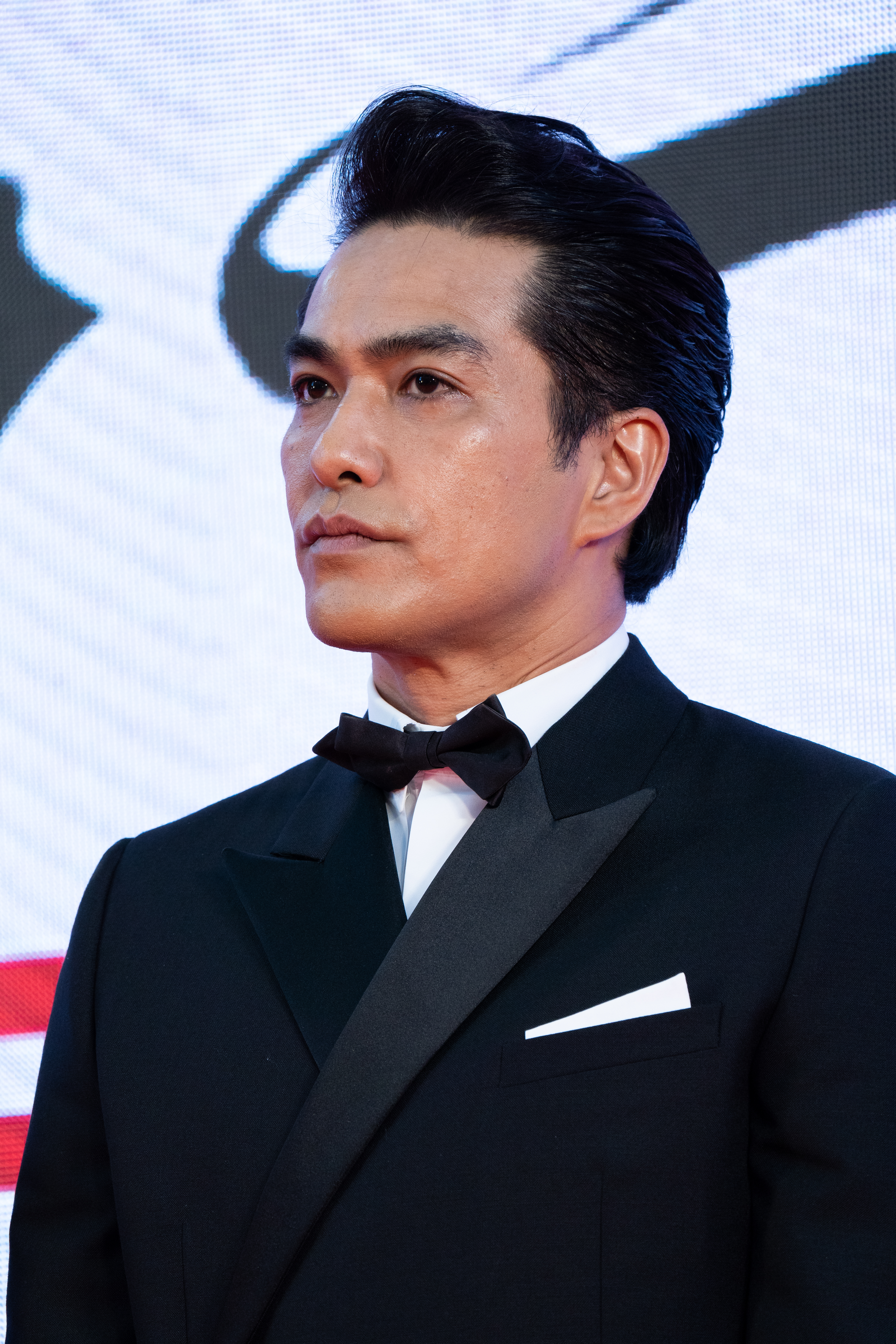
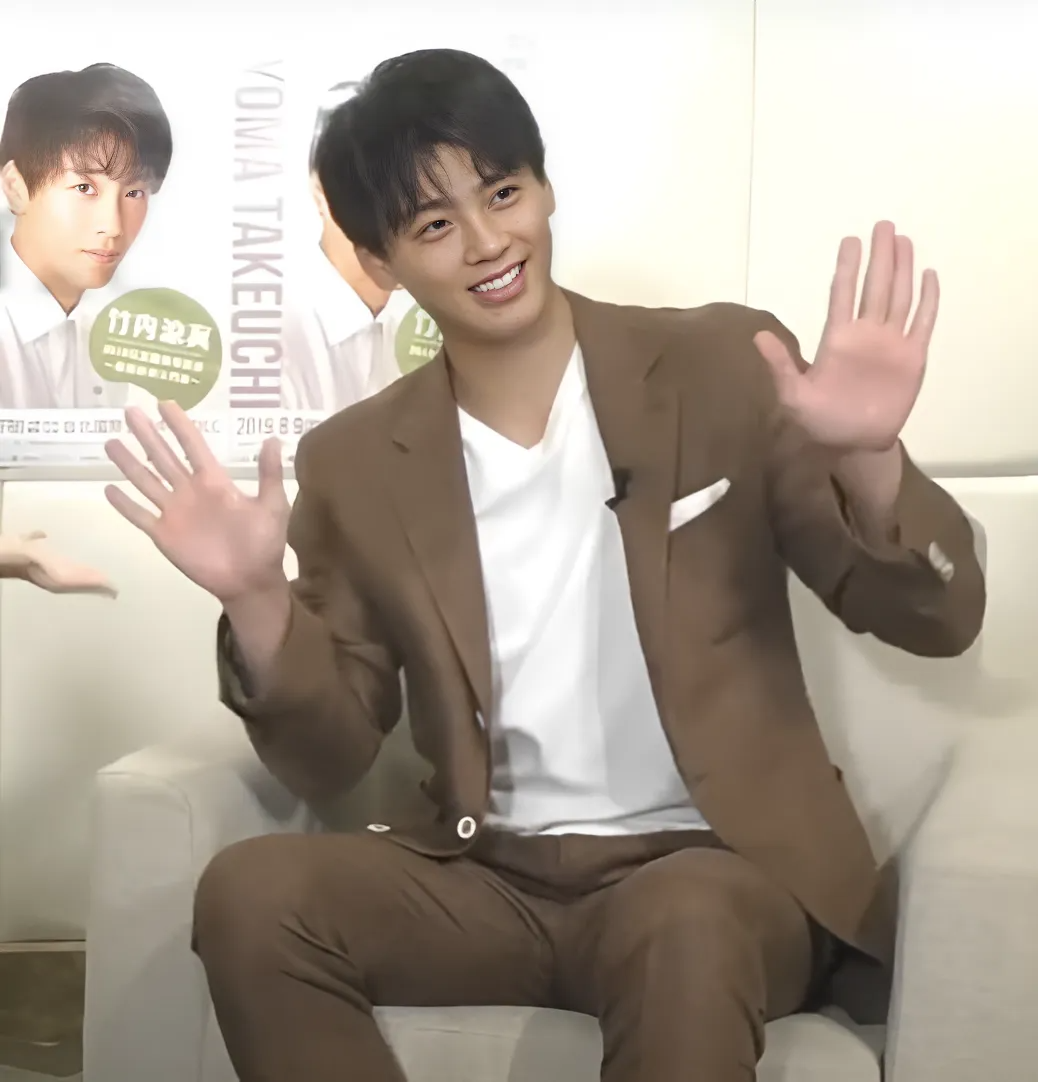
Masakatsu Funaki and Kazuki Kitamura have portrayed Kiryu in the live-action films whereas Ryoma Takeuchi portrays him in the drama series.

During the events of the zombie spinoff Yakuza: Dead Souls, Kiryu returns to Kamurocho after Haruka is kidnapped by a mysterious man. Kiryu's avatar is used in the spin-off title Ryū ga Gotoku Kenzan! for the protagonist Miyamoto Musashi, who also renames himself Kiryu Kazumanosuke. In Ryū ga Gotoku Ishin! and its remake Like a Dragon: Ishin!, Kiryu's avatar is once again used for the protagonist Sakamoto Ryōma.

In the film adaptation Like a Dragon: Prologue, Kiryu is portrayed by professional wrestler and mixed martial arts pioneer Masakatsu Funaki. This film serves as a prequel of the first Yakuza game describing Kiryu's youth where he meets recurring characters from the series. As he grows up, Kiryu starts desiring to form his own group, but gives up on this when his girlfriend is sexually assaulted and he decides to take the blame for killing the person to protect Nishikiyama. In the film, Like a Dragon, an adaptation of the first Yakuza game, Kiryu is portrayed by Kazuki Kitamura. In the Ryu ga Gotoku stage play, he is portrayed by Eiji Takigawa. Ryoma Takeuchi portrayed Kiryu in the 2024 live-action series, while Yasukaze Motomiya portrays Kiryu in a separate live-action series, Yakuza Powered By Nihon Touitsu, a collaboration between the Like a Dragon franchise and the drama series Nihon Touitsu, the latter of which Motomiya stars in.

== Reception ==
=== Critical response ===
Critical reception to Kiryu's character has been generally positive. IGN praised him as an appealing character, noting both his violent traits as well as his kindness. They further noted that while being a "badass", he stands out thanks to his kindness. The same website listed him as a notorious anti-hero as he "walks a fine line between good and bad." Greg Orlando from the magazine Newtype found him entertaining due to multiple actions he does across the series. Anthony John Agnello from GamesRadar praised Kiryu's initial appearance alongside his personality. Push Square listed him as one of the best characters seen in PlayStation games based on his skills in combat and sense of justice. The character's rivalry with Yakuza 2 antagonist Ryuji Goda was also the subject of positive response even if some writers felt it underused. 1UP.com called him "a hard-boiled thug" comparing him with characters like Niko and Alex Mercer due to his inhuman powers. They further noted that his powers can be "ridiculous." In a retrospective of the series, GameSpot compared Kiryu with Michael Corleone, the protagonist of the novel The Godfather by Mario Puzo. Colin Campbell from Polygon praised his heroic traits explored when dealing with multiple yakuzas. As a result, he found the PlayStation 3 Yakuza games less interesting due to a focus on Kiryu's struggle for a peaceful life, but, conversely, found Yakuza 5 to be more unique due to its wide variety of side content, including a minigame where Kiryu is a taxi driver.

As multiple games involved Kiryu returning to the yakuza life despite his retirement in the first game, USGamer criticized this recycling format and expected Yakuza 6 to bring the true end of Kiryu's arc. Matt Kim from US Gamer said Kiryu was his favorite paternal figure in gaming due to how caring he is to Haruka and to people in general despite his connections with the yakuza. GameSpot noted that while Kiryu was featured with pacifistic traits as he wishes to have a peaceful life with Haruka, he still has violent traits as he has no problems with beating up enemies across the series. In addition to Kiryu's story, the site also commented on how well developed his fighting style went from clunky to more unique, as latter games in the franchise included new characters with different fighting styles. GameInformer felt that the narrative gave the character an appropriate closure even if it is sad. Kotaku claimed that while Haruka's newfound happiness with Haruto serves as a positive note to close Kiryu's arc, the fact that Kiryu survives after receiving mortal wounds and leaves reduced the tension the player felt. Kotaku criticized the continuous usage of the character in latter games for continue having new arcs and feared his return as a playable and major character in Infinite Wealth would take the spotlight over his successor, Ichiban Kasuga. While praising the emotional moments Kiryu faces in Gaiden, Aftermath noted that the character's return in Infinite Wealth the character's death is definitive in comparison to the fake out from Yakuza 6 based on how the narrative focuses on Kiryu's health deteriorating due to cancer. Helping Kiryu remember his good actions and relationships was praised by Aftermath for adding to nostalgia value to returning gamers. Although the game does not give a full closure to Kiryu's life, the writer noted the final scenes show how much his health escalates but manages to make a proper closure.

In late 2023, scenes from Infinite Wealth were released showing Yong Yea's English voice work as Kiryu; some fans responded negatively, calling out Yea's work as disappointing, but Yea himself responded by pointing out that the fans had the option of playing in the original Japanese if they preferred.

=== Analysis ===
Sam Greszes from Polygon opined that the conflict between positive and toxic masculinity is at the core of the Yakuza franchise, and it is exemplified in the deterioration of Kiryu's relationship with Nishiki; he believes that Nishiki's circumstances are a clear representation of the horrific manner in which toxic masculinity can warp an individual's personality. Greszes was of the view that Nishiki's inferiority complex, borne from being unfavorably compared with Kiryu by his adopted father and other members of the Tojo Clan, combined with a series of personal tragedies culminating in his sister's tragic death, led him to become cold and unfeeling instead of grappling with his own intense pain and sadness. Andrew Tarantola from Engadget suggested that the majority of Kiryu's growth as a character in the series comes through his attempts to shield individuals he considers to be family from harm, such as Nishiki, and noted that he has many "families" with a complex degree of overlap and contradictory requirements between them. For example, Nishiki and Yumi were two-thirds of Kiryu's earliest family at Sunflower orphanage but also exist as part of the Serena Bar community, where Yumi worked with Reina, and where Nishiki and Kiryu were regular customers. Concurrently, Nishikiyama and Kazama make up the nexus of the "Tojima family", while Reina's unrequited love for Nishikiyama led her to betray Kiryu and other loyalists of the Tojo Clan, demonstrating the constant tension and competition between these factions and relationships.

Jay Castello from Eurogamer suggested that the series as a whole, particularly Yakuza Kiwami, is underpinned by the key theme of fatherhood. They suggested that both 0 and Kiwami demonstrate how both Nishiki and Kiryu were failed by their father figure, Shintaro Kazama, and that this failure is the true tragedy of the story arc. They noted that this theme comes from a specifically Japanese perspective, and is tied to the culture and structure of real-life yakuza crime families. Castello emphasized that Nishiki's loneliness and isolation, as he is often struggling to cope with his personal issues and does not have a support network of many other characters unlike Kiryu, is further compounded by what they identified as Kazama's favoritism for Kiryu and being a consistently absent parental figure to Nishiki. Castello observed that Kiwami also deals deeply with themes of accountability, noting that Kiryu came to realize that his decision to take the fall for Nishiki prevented both of them from dealing with the full extent of their responsibilities. Castello pointed out that Nishiki's final act as an apologetic gesture is to save Kiryu and his adoptive daughter Haruka Sawamura and destroy the money he had once been fighting for, albeit in the only way he knew how to: being over the top and driven purely by emotion.

Claudia Bonillo Fenrnandes from Zaragorza University said Majima and Kiryu's roles in Yakuza 0 are similar to 1980s yakuza as in such period Kansai used to get into conflicts with Kanto. Majima's story also explores the traffic of firearms and later traffic of humans when he meets Makoto Makimura. Majima's idolatrion for Shimano's clan reflects a similar trend in Japanese movies which embodies the concept of manliness in the same fashion as how Kiryu and Nishikiyama wish to become yakuza like their guardian Kazama.

Real life yakuza Midoriyama commented on the character during a review of the third game that "Kiryu is the way yakuza used to be. We kept the streets clean. People liked us. We didn't bother ordinary citizens. We respected our bosses. Now, guys like that only exist in video games." Critics have also noted that Kiryu was handled differently in the prequel Yakuza 0 and had mixed feelings on its execution. Anime News Network writer Dustin Bailey praised Kiryu's role in Yakuza 0 saying that while in most of the games he was portrayed as a "saintly Superman", in the prequel he enjoyed seeing the character involved in darker scenarios.

=== Legacy ===
In a Famitsu poll from 2010, Kiryu was voted as the eleventh best video game character. In a popularity poll from 2018 by Sega, Kiryu took the 2nd position behind Goro Majima. In 2024, a poll conducted by BAFTA with around 4,000 respondents named Kazuma Kiryu as the eighteenth most iconic video-game character of all time. Due to Like a Dragon's long running history of being exclusive to the PlayStation series of consoles, Kiryu is often recognized as a PlayStation mascot.

Kiryu's image was used to promote the male shaving brand Kai Razor, with Yakuza: Dead Souls featuring a scene of Kiryu using the product. Sega also sponsored a contest where the winner would get Kiryu's $9000 tattoo. The winner was Fari Salievski. The process took six months to complete. Salivevski commented, "Well, my nickname is now "The Dragon"... Whilst in Thailand, I had people coming up to me and taking photos, others came around wondering what all the fuss was about thinking I am some kind of celebrity. I could not stop laughing! my Facebook page gets a lot of comments too."

Kazuma Kiryu was the most requested second guest character in Bandai Namco's fighting game Tekken 7. Katsuhiro Harada, the producer of Tekken 7 and director of the series, stated that he was taken aback by the amount of demand there was for the character in the West. Even after the revealed guest characters were Geese Howard, Noctis Lucis Caelum, and Negan, fans of Kiryu took to Twitter to express their enthusiasm for having Kiryu included in the game. Yakuza producer Daisuke Sato stated that "As far as it comes down to the whole Tekken thing, if Harada-san actually says he wants to use Kiryu, then there it is."

Three years after the release of Tekken 7, Harada commented that the requests he receives for Kiryu to be in Tekken are still in high volume. In speaking to Red Bull France in an interview, Sega's chief creative officer Toshihiro Nagoshi had this to say in regard to Kiryu joining the Tekken roster: "We do get this request a lot. Of course, there are exceptions, but fighting games generally have female characters, and personally, I don't really want to see Kiryu beating up women." After Nagoshi's departure from Sega, Kiryu's inclusion in the Tekken franchise continues to be in high demand, particularly for 2024's Tekken 8.

In an interview with current series producer Masayoshi Yokoyama, in response to a question asked about including Kiryu in Tekken 8, he stated "I think it's better to say that going across mediums like how we did with [the Like A Dragon: Yakuza TV] series is better, rather than just going to another game...We receive all kind of invitations to appear in other games, but we never actually went over to their doorstep and said 'let us in.' I think going cross-medium is the better way to go about it."
