= Poseidon Wars 3-D =

1989 video game

- North American cover art
- Developer: Sega
- Publisher: Sega
- Platform: Master System
- Release: NA: March 1989; EU: 1989
- Genre: Rail shooter
- Mode: Single-player

Poseidon Wars 3-D is a 1989 rail shooter game developed and published by Sega for the Master System.

== Gameplay ==
The player has just been recruited to the United States Navy as a cadet. Like all cadets that serve in the U.S. Navy, the ultimate career goal is to be promoted to admiral. Players must go on various tours of duty with a submarine and destroy targets like battleships and anything vital to the enemy's war efforts. Upon completing a certain amount of missions, the player moves up in the Navy rankings.

If the player runs out of fuel or gets totally damaged, the mission becomes an immediate failure. In this manner, the fuel acts as a sort of time limit that is realistically indicated in-game.
