= Ichiban Kasuga =

Fictional character from the Yakuza series

- Yakuza / Like a Dragon character
- Render of Ichiban Kasuga as he appears in Yakuza: Like a Dragon (2020)
- First game: Ryu ga Gotoku Online (2018)
- Voiced by: EN: Kaiji Tang; JP: Kazuhiro Nakaya

In-universe information
- Nationality: Japanese

Ichiban Kasuga (Japanese: 春日 一番, Hepburn: Kasuga Ichiban), also nicknamed Ichi (一), is a main character from Sega's Like a Dragon video game franchise, formerly known internationally as Yakuza, taking over as the main protagonist of the franchise following Yakuza 6: The Song of Life, initially announced to be the final title with Kazuma Kiryu as the main protagonist. Kasuga was first introduced in the 2018 mobile game Ryu ga Gotoku Online, a freemium collectible card game spin-off which is exclusively released in Japan. Kasuga is the protagonist in the 2020 video game Yakuza: Like A Dragon, the first main series Yakuza title which does not feature the former series lead Kiryu as a playable character. Kasuga is voiced by Kazuhiro Nakaya (who previously voiced Akira Nishikiyama) in Japanese, and by Kaiji Tang in English.

Within the series, Kasuga is originally a low-ranking member of the Arakawa Family, a subsidiary yakuza family of the Kanto-based Tojo Clan. He willingly goes to prison for a murder that he did not commit at the turn of the 21st century, having acquiesced to the request of his clan patriarch, Masumi Arakawa. Upon his release 18 years later, Kasuga discovers that Arakawa has apparently betrayed the rest of the Tojo Clan to the Omi Alliance, a rival yakuza organization based in Osaka, and finds himself stranded in the city of Yokohama. In the sequel Like a Dragon: Infinite Wealth, Kasuga travels to Hawaii to find his mother Akane who is connected with Arakawa and meets several allies and enemies who have their own agenda for wanting to find the same person.

Kasuga was designed by franchise developers Ryu Ga Gotoku Studio for Ryu ga Gotoku Online, though a decision was later made by executive director and franchise creator Toshihiro Nagoshi and his team to position Kasuga as the lead character of future mainline entry games. Despite sharing certain traits in their backstories, both characters have little in common with each other in terms of personality, as Kasuga is written to be more emotive and outspoken in temperament. The character has received a generally positive response from critics and players in the video game community, with praise going towards his character arc and the vocal performances by Nakaya and Tang, as well as the consensus that he is a suitable choice to succeed Kiryu's role as the lead character in future games.

== Concept and design ==
The end of development for Yakuza 6: The Song of Life, which brought Kazuma Kiryu's story arc to a close, coincided with the commencement of development for the 2018 mobile title Ryu ga Gotoku Online. The Yakuza franchise's developers, Ryu Ga Gotoku Studio, wanted to create a new lead character to continue the narrative of the fictional universe they have created. Chief producer and writer Masayoshi Yokoyama noted that their goal after Yakuza 6 was not to "create the next Yakuza title" but to "create the next protagonist." Realizing that this new protagonist could serve as the franchise's "catalyst for change" by moving away from the exploration of a modern version of a typical Japanese hero in Kiryu, Yokoyama set about creating and portraying a "life-sized hero", a protagonist who is essentially a "normal guy" who is not as strong or mature as Kiryu.

To differentiate him from Kiryu, Kasuga is written to be less stoic and more emotive in comparison. Yokoyama positioned Kasuga's personality as the opposite of Kiryu's in many ways: "thoroughly uncomplicated, direct, cheerful, reckless". Toshihiro Nagoshi approved of the decision to change the franchise's lead character from Kiryu to Kasuga. Commenting on the transition of genres between an action-adventure game to a turn-based role-playing game for Like A Dragon, he said the change occurs because of the different objective, which itself had changed because of Kasuga's different personality to Kiryu's since they speak, think and act differently. Consequently, a storyline starring Kasuga would naturally include more comedic or goofy scenes due to the character's nature.

Kasuga is an orphan raised in Kamurochō by Jiro Kasuga, the manager of a soapland, a type of prostitution establishment that provides its services based on the exploitation of a loophole in Japanese law. His background of being born and raised in one of Japan's "grey zones" was set from the start. As a major story theme in Like a Dragon concerns the struggles of individuals who are not clearly defined by moral absolutes, this allowed the game's writers to position Kasuga from a perspective that humanizes such individuals as common everyday people. Yokoyama does not believe in portraying unconditional good and evil, as he believes that people with criminal records are capable of righteousness, while members of society who are respected by the public are capable of evil. To Yokoyama, Kasuga's comical "fool" deliberately contrasts the dark setting of Like a Dragon, and that his most important role in the game is to overturning "worldly prejudices" and fight against "invisible discrimination". The character's fascination with Dragon Quest serves as the impetus for the series' change from action adventure to role-playing games.

=== Casting ===
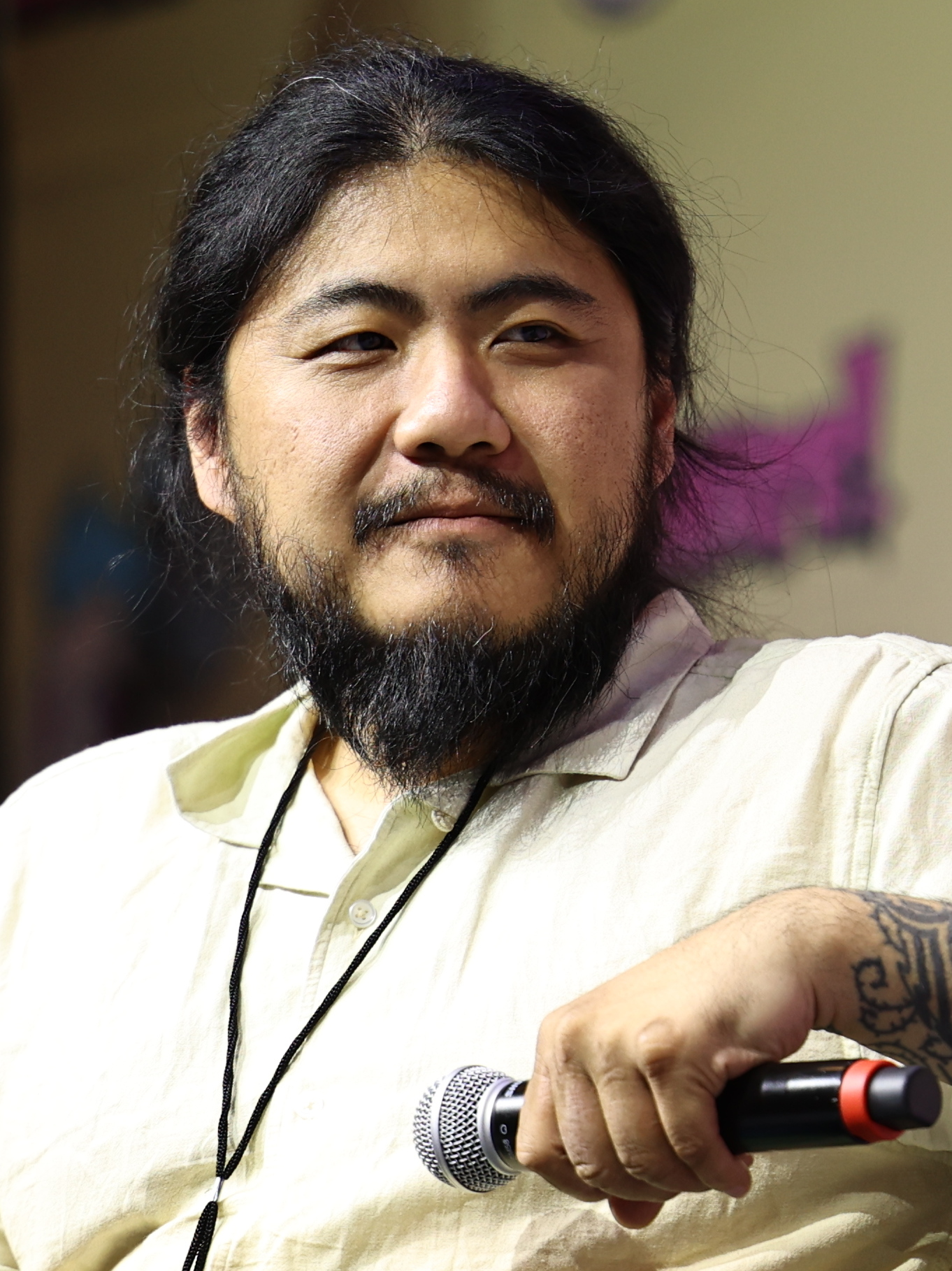
Kaiji Tang voices Kasuga in English.

Auditions of the character started early in development to appreciate him sooner. Kazuhiro Nakaya, who previously voiced recurring franchise character Akira Nishikiyama, was one of the candidates who read for the role. Yokoyama said that Nakaya's reading of the character's scripted lines projected a rebellious personality which stood out to the developers. After a discussion between Yokoyama and Nagoshi, Nakaya was chosen for the role. Nakaya interpreted Kasuga as an energetic and vivid character when reading the script. Following the worldwide release of Like a Dragon by late 2020, Nakaya indicated in an interview with Famitsu that Kasuga will lead the series for the foreseeable future, and that he was grateful for the support from Takaya Kuroda, Kiryu's voice actor, with regards to the transition.

Kasuga's English voice actor, Kaiji Tang, describes him as a "whimsical" character who, despite being the game's protagonist, also serves the role of a supporting character due to how he often assists his allies. Tang said that his character is the "opposite" of Kiryu in terms of personality. He believes that Kasuga fits the Yakuza setting due to his love for Dragon Quest, as well as his heroic demeanor which goes along the new type of gameplay Like a Dragon provided to the franchise. During recording of the game, Tang befriended Greg Chun, who voices supporting character Nanba. Tang and has cited Chun's work as an inspiration. Tang notes that he was able to draw upon his life experiences as an Asian man to help with his performance as Kasuga. For example, in a pivotal scene where Kasuga's mentor promises to take him to try Peking duck, he helped the rest of the cast understand what the dish was by ordering some for them to eat.

== Appearances ==
=== Yakuza: Like A Dragon ===
In 2001, Yakuza Ichiban Kasuga agrees to go to prison for a murder that he did not commit to repay Arakawa Family patriarch Masumi Arakawa for saving his life in his youth. 18 years later, Kasuga is released from prison. He meets ex-detective Koichi Adachi, who explains that while Kasuga was in jail, Arakawa defected to the Osaka-based Omi Alliance and betrayed the Tojo Clan to the Tokyo Metropolitan Police. Arakawa's son Masato, whom he used to serve as his personal attendant, had apparently died due to illness, the tragedy of which supposedly fuels Arakawa's ruthlessness behind his rise to power. Kasuga is shot by Arakawa when he attempts to confront him.

Kasuga is nursed back to health by Nanba, a local homeless man and disbarred nurse. Kasuga starts accepting work from an employment agency to earn a living, and later investigate the Liumang with his friends to learn the truth behind the murder of one of their employers, a soapland proprietor named Nonomiya. Kasuga's investigation embroils him in a conspiracy involving a massive counterfeiting ring being run by the Ijin Three at the behest of a powerful Japanese politician, Yutaka Ogikubo. He also discovers that the anti-crime activist group Bleach Japan is indirectly responsible for Nonomiya's death. After sighting a picture of Ryo Aoki, the upstart Governor of Tokyo and co-founder of Bleach Japan, Kasuga recognizes him as an actual living Masato Arakawa.

Kasuga learns from Seiryu Clan chairman Ryuhei Hoshino that the counterfeit bill is proof that Arakawa shot him in a non-lethal manner to create a false impression of his demise. Kasuga and the Ijin Three leaders resolve to field a candidate they would endorse to compete with Bleach Japan loyalist Souta Kume's candidacy for the upcoming regional representative election. During their preparations, Kasuga hears of an important Omi Alliance meeting in Osaka that Arakawa will attend. He infiltrates the meeting and finds Arakawa with several Tojo Clan figures. Kasuga learns that Arakawa is a double agent, and that once the Omi chairman, Masaru Watase, is released from prison, he will make a joint announcement with Dojima to disband their respective clans. After facing the Omi, Kasuga reconciles with Arakawa, but is shocked next day to learn of his death. To draw out Aoki in order to confront him, Kasuga decides to enter himself as an electoral candidate with Hoshino's support, but Aoki's henchman Jo Sawashiro assassinates Hoshino. Following his defeat, Sawashiro informs Kasuga that Arakawa's son was switched for his own son as an infant, and implies that Arakawa may have been Kasuga's birth father all along.

Kasuga confronts Aoki during an election rally and tricks him into sending his men to the Millenium Tower at Kamurochō after lying about Sawashiro leaking the existence of incriminating evidence at the Arakawa Family office. Kasuga arranges for Aoki to be lured to the Arakawa Family office, and used the opportunity to record incriminating evidence against him and expose his true nature to the general public. Kasuga trails a fleeing Aoki and pleads with him to give himself up. Aoki is about to come around but is fatally stabbed by a disillusioned Kume. Following the funeral service for Arakawa and Aoki, Kasuga decides to remain in Ijincho to stay with his friends.

=== Like a Dragon: Infinite Wealth ===
Three years after Arakawa's death, Kasuga tries to propose to Saeko but is rejected. VTuber Hisoka Tatara spreads false rumors of Kasuga building his own crime ring, which gets Kasuga fired from his job. Masataka Ebina informs them that he is working with Jo Sawashiro, who has been released from prison after being proven innocent, with the former's help, in the murder of the previous Seiryu Clan Chairman Ryuhei Hoshino. Sawashiro reveals to Kasuga that his biological mother, Akane Kishida, is alive and has been living in Honolulu, Hawaii, and asks Kasuga to meet her. Upon arriving in Hawaii, Kasuga encounters several people who try to be him as well as a dying Kiryu. Gaining intel from Chitose, Kasuga discovers that Akane was part of a religious charity group called Palekana and that two of Hawaii's largest gangs, the Barracudas and the Chinese Ganzhe Mafia, are also after Akane.

Kasuga tracks Akane and Lani hiding in a yacht offshore. En route to a Daidoji safehouse, Akane reveals that Lani is the last surviving member of the Mililani family, the true successor to the title of Sage of Palekana, and that Bryce usurped the position by murdering the previous Sage. Upon reaching the safehouse, Chitose reveals that Eiji is a Seiryu Clan spy, who faked his disability to gain Kasuga's trust. Kasuga's party investigates a secret passage within District Five, which leads to a hidden port heading to Nele Island. Lani is rescued from the Barracudas, and with Yamai's help, the party, Lani and Akane escape to Japan. With Lani and Akane safe in Japan, Kasuga assaults Nele Island and discover a natural cave filled with barrels of nuclear waste, revealing Palekana's waste disposal facility as a lie. Kasuga defeats Bryce, and Chitose livestreams the entire facility's nuclear waste and confesses to being Tatara. Kasuga tracks down an injured Eiji hiding in Kamurocho, and convinces him to turn himself in. A month later, Kasuga attempts to properly confess his feelings for Saeko, but inadvertently embarrasses her by wearing a t-shirt celebrating their relationship.

=== Other appearances ===
Kasuga first appears in the 2018 Ryu ga Gotoku Online, which presents an alternate version of his character arc following his release from prison. Unlike in Like A Dragon, this incarnation of Kasuga never leaves Kamurochō, and encounters a different cast of supporting characters as well as enemies. Kasuga appears as an unlockable player character of the promotional freeware game Streets of Kamurocho, developed and released as part of Sega's 60th anniversary celebrations in October 2020. Kasuga appears in a limited-time downloadable content for Dave the Diver. He also appears as a playable character via DLC in Sonic Racing: CrossWorlds.

== Reception ==
=== Promotion ===
Ichiban Kasuga was first publicly revealed in August 2017 as part of the developer's promotional efforts for the then-upcoming Ryu ga Gotoku Online. Kasuga was featured prominently in the marketing campaign for Like a Dragon, such as the game's cover art, promotional trailers, and social media videos. A 2019 gameplay trailer featuring Kasuga and his party engaging enemies in a turn-based RPG battle system was initially interpreted as an April Fools' Day joke due to its gameplay mechanics which was considered unusual for the series, as well as the timing of its release date and its proximity to the 1st of April. A line of Yakuza franchise merchandise developed by apparel company SuperGroupie was launched in June 2021, including watches, bags, jackets, and shoes, all of which will have details inspired by Kasuga's appearances in the games. A cologne label titled "Ichiban Kasuga Eau de Toilette", which was developed as a collaboration with fragrance company Fits Corporation, was unveiled during the franchise's 15th anniversary live stream by Sega.

=== Critical response ===
Kasuga was generally well received by critics in their preview commentary of Like a Dragon. GameSpot compared him to Goro Majima based on similar traits they share "though a lot less deranged", while also noting that he is quite different from Kiryu despite sharing other traits in their backstories. GamesRadar enjoyed the game mechanics presented towards Kasuga and his allies, making their wait for the game's release worthwhile. Eurogamer describes him as a kind character due to how Kasuga aims to become a hero regardless of not being as intelligent as other Yakuza main characters.

Kasuga has received a very positive response from the video game community following the release of Like a Dragon. Michael Higham from GameSpot praised Kasuga as an endearing lead character who is immediately loveable and helps gives the franchise "a fresh start". Jorge Jimenez from PC Gamer praised Kasuga's optimistic characterization, a "goofy, happy go lucky gangster who loves classic JRPGs", as an effective way of explaining the franchise's drastic genre shift with Like a Dragon. Leah Williams and Tegan Jones from Kotaku Australia welcomed the decision to have Kasuga succeed Kiryu as the new lead character of the franchise, lauding his character arc to be simultaneously moving as well as one filled with ridiculous fun. They believe that Kasuga is a good example of how slapstick humour can be blended seamlessly with high octane action to create an excellent, engaging story. Chris Moyse from Destructoid praised Kasuga's character arc for "masterfully blending stoicism, bravery, pathos, heroism, and just the right amount of complete and utter idiocy to immediately win the hearts of the Yakuza faithful". German publication GamePro lauded Kasuga for his big heart and highly emotive nature, qualities which they feel a lot of protagonist characters lack. On the other hand, Dia Lacina from Paste Magazine expressed mixed feelings over Kasuga's portrayal: while Lacina liked that Kasuga is more imminently relatable and achievable as a hero archetype, she criticized the naive speech Kasuga gives to defend Nonomiya's reprehensible behaviour based on his own experience of having grown up under the care of a brothel manager as unconvincing and somewhat insulting.

Several publications rated Kasuga as among the best video game characters featured in 2020, a year where Like A Dragon saw an international release. Giovanni Colantonio from Inverse considered Kasuga to be the best playable protagonist of 2020 because he is allowed to be a naive and flawed character who makes plenty of mistakes, a trait rarely seen in most video game heroes, which led to the best character development of any other character in the industry in his view. Hayes Madsen from Screen Rant said Kasuga is the most important protagonist in games for the year 2020, and called him an inspiring character due to his unfailing kindness and warmth of humanity, and that his story arc in Like a Dragon put forward meaningful commentary on the inequalities of society. Chingy Nea from Kotaku praised Kasuga as the Yakuza series' most relatable protagonist and one of its best characters, and the main reason why Like a Dragon was a source of comfort and joy for her in late-2020. Game Informer ranked Kasuga third place on the publication's list of the top 10 characters of 2020, with Joe Juba commenting that Kasuga's characterization balances the story's tension "with an infectious desire to help the people society overlooks". Naming Kasuga one of the best new characters of 2020, Destructoid staff observed that Kasuga managed to fill the void left by Kiryu "with relative ease", and that his immediate popularity with the video game community successfully secures the Yakuza franchise's future in their view.

Game Informer writer Marcus Stewart said that Ichiban Kasuga was similar to Sora from Kingdom Hearts but Kasuga stands out as more heroic and respected than stylish than Sora who does not make a notable arc in the multiple games he is featured in to the point of being overshadowed by his friends who are recognized as better Keyblade users. Stewart believes that Kasuga shows that a cheerful person can still be respectable and Sora needs to be shown in that regards.

The performances of both Kazuhiro Nakaya and Kaiji Tang as the Japanese and English voices of Kasuga were also praised by Polygon and Atomix. Anime News Network in particular enjoyed Tang's performance as "absolutely spot-on" due to the multiple expressions he gives to his character. RPGFan also regarded Tang as one of the best actors in the entire game based on the impact of his deliveries.
