= Yakuza 6: The Song of Life =

2016 video game

- North American cover art
- Developer: Ryu Ga Gotoku Studio (Note: Ported to Windows by QLOC)
- Publisher: Sega
- Director: Hiroyuki Sakamoto
- Producer: Masayoshi Yokoyama
- Designer: Ryosuke Horii
- Programmers: Koji Tokieda; Yutaka Ito
- Artist: Nobuaki Mitake
- Writers: Tsuyoshi Furuta; Masayoshi Yokoyama
- Composers: Chihiro Aoki; Hidenori Shoji; Saori Yoshida; Yuri Fukuda; Kenichi Tokoi; Hyd Lunch; ZENTA
- Series: Yakuza
- Platforms: PlayStation 4; Windows; Xbox One
- Release: PlayStation 4: JP: December 8, 2016; WW: April 17, 2018; Windows, Xbox One: WW: March 25, 2021
- Genres: Action-adventure, beat 'em up
- Mode: Single-player

Yakuza 6: The Song of Life (Note: Japanese: 龍が如く6 命の詩。, Hepburn: Ryū ga Gotoku Shikkusu: Inochi no Uta.; lit. "Like a Dragon 6: The Poem of Life.") is a 2016 action-adventure game developed by Ryu Ga Gotoku Studio and published by Sega for PlayStation 4. The game is the seventh main installment in the Yakuza series and the final main game to feature Kazuma Kiryu as the primary protagonist, and was released in Japan in December 2016. The English version was released in Southeast Asia in March 2018, and worldwide the following month. Versions for Windows and Xbox One were released in March 2021. The game was followed up by Yakuza Kiwami 2, a remake of the second game, and by Yakuza: Like a Dragon, the next chronological installment, released in 2020.

== Gameplay ==
Yakuza 6 is an action-adventure game set in an open world environment and played from a third-person perspective. It is similar to that of other Yakuza titles with exploration mixed with arcade style beat 'em up combat with ragdoll physics. Yakuza 6 was the first game in the series to use the new Dragon Engine game engine (later used in Yakuza Kiwami 2, Yakuza: Like a Dragon and the spin-off Judgment series), which overhauls the presentation and combat mechanics compared to past games. It also features an advanced variant of Yakuza 5's Dragon Spirit Mode, called Extreme Heat Mode, where Kiryu becomes resistant to knockback as long as his Heat remains, and his combo finishers can turn into Heat actions that take out immense amounts of health. Additionally, as is also later used in Yakuza Kiwami 2, the game categorizes experience points into different types and the player can grant themselves various upgrades by using experience of the correct type; experience points can also be earned by eating at restaurants, though doing this raises the hunger gauge which limits how much food the player can eat and reduces itself with time.

Unlike Yakuza 4, Yakuza 5 and Yakuza 0, Yakuza 6 does not feature any playable characters besides Kiryu himself. Additionally, unlike 0 and Yakuza Kiwami, Kiryu only uses one fighting style. This game features the series staple location of Kamurochō, Tokyo, as well as a new city, Onomichi, Hiroshima Prefecture. Onomichi stands out from other cities in the series in that its name is the same as its real world counterpart, with the area featured in game being a recreation of the city's Shingai district.

== Synopsis ==
=== Characters and settings ===
Yakuza 6: The Song of Life takes place in winter 2016, and features two major settings: the Kamurochō district of Tokyo, and the Jingaicho district of Onomichi, Hiroshima. Kazuma Kiryu (Takaya Kuroda) returns as the sole playable protagonist, along with several of his allies from previous titles in supporting capacities: Shun Akiyama (Koichi Yamadera), Makoto Date (Kazuhiro Yamaji), Daigo Dojima (Satoshi Tokushige), Goro Majima (Hidenari Ugaki), and Taiga Saejima (Rikiya Koyama). The story is centered around Kiryu's adoptive daughter, Haruka Sawamura (Rie Kugimiya), who has become a mother to an infant child named Haruto. Kiryu sets out to learn the truth about Haruto and the circumstances behind his birth, while being embroiled in a massive conflict between the Tojo Clan and several other crime organizations in Kamurochō and Onomichi.

Yakuza 6 features a new supporting cast in Onomichi, including: the local yakuza group Hirose Family, consisting of Patriarch Toru Hirose (Beat Takeshi), family captain Tsuyoshi Nagumo (Hiroyuki Miyasako), and members Yuta Usami (Tatsuya Fujiwara), Takaaki Matsunaga (Doronzu Ishimoto), and Naoto Tagashira (Yoshimasa Hosoya); and Kiyomi Kasahara (Yōko Maki), owner of a local snack bar. Opposing Kiryu and his allies are: Takeru Kurusu (Masane Tsukayama), real name Heizo Iwami, chairman of the Yomei Alliance, a Hiroshima-based yakuza organization; Tsuneo Iwami (Nao Ōmori), Kurusu's son and CEO of Iwami Shipbuilding; Kanji Koshimizu (Ayumi Tanida), captain of the Yomei Alliance; Katsumi Sugai (Ryūsei Nakao), acting chairman of the Tojo Clan; Takumi Someya (Shun Oguri), an aspiring Tojo Clan patriarch and Sugai's right-hand man, as well as Kiyomi's ex-husband; Big Lo (Junpei Morita), leader of the Chinese Saio Triad; and Joongi Han (Note: The character's name was originally spelled Joon-gi Han in English localization, but was corrected with the release of Like a Dragon: Infinite Wealth.) (Yuichi Nakamura), leader of the Korean Jingweon Mafia.

=== Plot ===
After recovering from injuries sustained in his fight with Masato Aizawa, (Note: As depicted in Yakuza 5) Kazuma Kiryu is arrested for his past crimes, and willingly spends three years in prison, hoping for a peaceful life with his fostered children. In his absence, an arson attack in Kamurocho's Little Asia district skews the criminal underworld's power balance: the Tojo Clan's chairman Daigo Dojima is framed for the arson and imprisoned alongside Goro Majima. Taiga Saejima also returns to jail for his actions in Hokkaido. Katsumi Sugai and Takumi Someya usurp the Tojo Clan; the Chinese Saio Triad, specializing in heihaizi human trafficking, rises to power in the area; and the Korean Jingweon Mafia resurfaces, occupying most of Kamurochō.

Upon release in 2016, Kiryu discovers that Haruka Sawamura hid herself in Onomichi, Hiroshima from the paparazzi after her controversial retirement, and is currently in a coma after a hit and run accident in Kamurochō. Learning that she has an infant son, Haruto, Kiryu travels with the baby to Onomichi. Upon arrival, Kiryu befriends the local Hirose family, its patriarch Toru Hirose, and members Tsuyoshi Nagumo, Naoto Tagashira, Takaaki Matsunaga and Yuta Usami. He also becomes acquainted with a local snack bar owner, Kiyomi Kasahara, who frequently takes care of Haruto.

Searching for Haruto's father, he meets prominent figures of the Onomichi yakuza world: Takeru Kurusu, real name Heizo Iwami, chairman of the powerful Yomei alliance, and his son Tsuneo Iwami, CEO of his front company, Iwami Shipbuilding. Kiryu also learns that Sugai and Someya initially provoked the war with the Saio Triad in the Tojo Clan's name, which included burning Little Asia, so that Daigo could be framed and arrested. However, the hostility between the gangs became genuine after Iwami empowered the Saio Triad. Iwami later betrayed them and dispatched the Jingweon Mafia to murder Jimmy Lo, the eldest son of their leader, Big Lo. Iwami and the Saio Triad also share the "secret of Onomichi". Likewise, Sugai and Someya want the Saio Triad suppressed, with the latter requesting support from Kiryu. Kiryu rejects the offer because of his role in framing Daigo.

Hirose eventually reveals that Yuta is Haruto's father, and the youngest son of Big Lo. From birth, Lo's subordinates secretly manipulated Yuta into learning Chinese culture in case his elder brother died, so that he could replace him and reign over the triad, per hereditary succession. After Jimmy's murder, the Saio Triad attempted to kill Haruto because of his mixed bloodline. However, Saio member Shu Tatsukawa and his Jingweon allies decided to sell Haruto to Iwami, who wanted to prove that he has the final authority over them by keeping the child. Tatsukawa convinced Haruka of the plan in Kamurochō but accidentally ran her over during the process. Tatsukawa would later be killed by the Saio for his treachery.

Iwami later orders the Jingweon Mafia to kidnap Haruto, who is saved by Kiryu and his allies. The Jingweon Mafia's leader, Joongi Han, attempts to reveal Onomichi's secret to Kiryu, but is killed by an unknown assailant. Yuta, disgusted by his father's actions, attempts to commit murder-suicide by burning down Little Asia, but Kiryu saves them both. Big Lo recovers and tells Kiryu that Hirose deliberately told Yuta about his background to provoke him into killing Lo, as he failed to obey Hirose's command to leave Japan, because of his knowledge of the "secret of Onomichi". Realizing that Hirose had been killing anyone connected to the "secret", including Han, Kiryu returns to Onomichi to confront him; the secret is revealed to be a third Yamato-class battleship, intended for use against the American occupation forces and built illegally by Iwami Shipbuilding who hired illegal Chinese immigrants in collusion with the Saio Triad. The project was funded by Minoru Daidoji, nicknamed the Fixer, a politician who embezzled taxpayer money from Hiroshima citizens. Kurusu appears and reveals himself as the mastermind behind the murders. He orders Hirose to kill Kiryu and the Hirose Family for exposing the secret but Hirose refuses, resulting in his execution. Daidoji later names Iwami as his new right-hand man and orders him to execute Kurusu, since he failed to execute Kiryu and his allies. Iwami also announces his plan to fully dominate the Yomei Alliance and Tojo Clan.

Kiryu and his allies assault the Millennium Tower to confront Iwami and Sugai, but Kiryu is forced to fight Someya. Kiryu defeats Someya but quickly learns that Kiyomi, Someya's ex-wife, is being held hostage at gunpoint by Iwami and Sugai. In an attempt to save Kiyomi, Someya commits suicide by stabbing himself in the stomach, but Kiyomi is seemingly killed. Mourning Someya and Kiyomi, Kiryu and the Hirose Family mount a full-scale invasion of the Yomei Alliance. In anticipation, Iwami and Sugai kidnap the awoken Haruka and Haruto. The Hirose Family rescues the two, and a heavily wounded Kiryu defeats Iwami, but is shot by Sugai. Kiryu seemingly dies before Sugai takes his own life. Iwami is imprisoned, Daidoji dies of old age, and the Hirose family and Haruka mourn Kiryu's death. It is revealed that Kiyomi survived and she is reunited with her daughter.

By January 2017, a politician serving as Daidoji's successor attempts to bribe an alive and recovering Kiryu into silence regarding Daidoji's crimes, which would jeopardize several high-profile politicians. In exchange for his silence, Kiryu demands Daigo's release from imprisonment to prevent a war between the Tojo Clan and Yomei Alliance, and has the politician fake his death to ensure that Haruka and her family can live in peace. After Daigo's release from prison, Daigo, Saejima, and Majima regroup and pledge to create an alliance with the Yomei in honor of Kiryu's will.

Returning to Okinawa one last time, Kiryu observes the Morning Glory orphanage from a distance, and sees that Haruka, Yuta, Haruto, and the other adopted children are living peacefully. As Haruto takes his first steps, he sees Kiryu, who walks away before anyone else can spot him.

== Development ==
Yakuza 6 was announced on September 15, 2015, at the Tokyo Game Show during the Sony conference, exclusively for PlayStation 4 and with a release date of "Autumn 2016". Toshihiro Nagoshi of Sega confirmed that more details would be revealed during the rest of the event. A traditional Chinese localization was announced for the Asia region. Beat Takeshi was also announced to be playing a character within the game. The game also features New Japan Pro-Wrestling wrestlers Hiroshi Tanahashi, Hiroyoshi Tenzan, Kazuchika Okada, Satoshi Kojima, Tetsuya Naito and Toru Yano, who play fictionalized versions of themselves in the game, all under a group known as "JUSTIS", in which Okada's entrance theme, "Rainmaker" by Yonosuke Kitamura, is played during his battle in the climax of the Clan Creator storyline. In addition, darts player Paul Lim, the first player to score a Nine-dart finish in a world championship appears as himself during a sub-story. He speaks English, only the second time the language is heard in the series.

This is the first game in the series to be developed exclusively for the PlayStation 4, featuring the all new "Dragon Engine".

Yakuza 6 also includes Virtua Fighter 5: Final Showdown, Puyo Puyo, Out Run, Super Hang-On, Space Harrier, and Fantasy Zone as playable games in the form of basic play spots. Virtua Fighter 5: Final Showdown and Puyo Puyo include two-player modes as well. Virtua Fighter 5: Final Showdown is based on Version B of the game and Yakuza 6 is the only official release of this version outside Japan. Puyo Puyo was based on Puyo Puyo Tetris.

For Yakuza 6, Kiryu's orphanage, named "Sunshine Orphanage" in previous western releases, was renamed to "Morning Glory" (the literal translation of its Japanese name Asagao (アサガオ)). Yakuza series localization director Scott Strichart explained that as Goro Majima had managed a cabaret club called Sunshine in Yakuza 0, it felt too much of a coincidence that both Majima and Kiryu would both come to have a place called "Sunshine" play a big part in their lives. He then said that as such, it would likely lead to the impression that Kiryu had decided to name his orphanage after the cabaret club, which seemed highly inappropriate for his character. This change was retained in later re-releases of prior games.

=== Demo ===
The demo for Yakuza 6 was released on February 27, 2018, for North America, Europe, and Australia. The US version was pulled from the PlayStation Store after Sega discovered that they accidentally released the full game in that region. The Australian and European demos were pulled from the PlayStation Store the next day, and all the free copies of the game in the US had their digital license revoked. On March 19, 2018, the demo was re-released on the PlayStation Store.

== Reception ==
=== Critical response ===
Reception

Aggregate scores
| Aggregator | Score |
|---|---|
| Metacritic | PS4: 83/100; PC: 82/100; XONE: 87/100 |
| OpenCritic | 91% recommend (Note: Based on 131 reviews) |

Review scores
| Publication | Score |
|---|---|
| Destructoid | 7/10 |
| Edge | 8/10 |
| Electronic Gaming Monthly | 9.0/10 |
| Famitsu | 39/40 |
| Game Informer | 9.25/10 |
| GameRevolution | 4.5/5 |
| GameSpot | 8/10 |
| GamesRadar+ | 4.5/5 |
| IGN | 7.5/10 |
| Polygon | 8.5/10 |

Yakuza 6: The Song of Life received "generally favorable" reviews from critics, according to review aggregator Metacritic.

The game received a score of 39/40 from the video game magazine Famitsu. The German magazine 4Players gave it 85 out of 100 points.

Some questioned the inclusion of the chat room mini game where real world AV models strip on successful button prompts. Though acknowledging their presence does truthfully reflect prominent parts of the real-world Japanese nightlife and adult industries, they felt they were inconsistent with the character of Kiryu.

=== Sales ===
In its first week of release in Japan, it sold 218,168 copies. Combined with the rest of Asia, the game shipped over 500,000 units by December 16, 2016. It was the third best selling video game in the United Kingdom during its European debut week, making it the biggest launch for the series in the UK. As of June 2018, the game has sold 800,000-900,000 units worldwide, with overseas markets accounting for approximately half of the game's sales.

=== Accolades ===
The game was nominated for "Best Storytelling" and "PlayStation Game of the Year" at the 2018 Golden Joystick Awards, and for the Tin Pan Alley Award for Best Music in a Game at the New York Game Awards.
