= Like a Dragon: Infinite Wealth =

2024 video game

- Developer: Ryu Ga Gotoku Studio
- Publisher: Sega
- Director: Ryosuke Horii
- Producer: Hiroyuki Sakamoto
- Designer: Hirotaka Chiba
- Programmer: Yutaka Ito
- Artist: Nobuaki Mitake
- Writers: Kazunobu Takeuchi; Tsuyoshi Furuta; Masayoshi Yokoyama
- Composers: Chihiro Aoki; Keitaro Hanada; Hyd Lunch; Hidenori Shoji; Yuri Fukuda; Saori Yoshida; 83key; Rintaro Soma
- Series: Like a Dragon
- Platforms: PlayStation 4; PlayStation 5; Windows; Xbox One; Xbox Series X/S
- Release: January 26, 2024
- Genre: Role-playing
- Mode: Single-player

Like a Dragon: Infinite Wealth (Note: Japanese: 龍が如く8, Hepburn: Ryū ga Gotoku Eito; lit. "Like a Dragon 8") is a 2024 role-playing video game developed by Ryu Ga Gotoku Studio and published by Sega. The ninth main installment in the Like a Dragon series, Infinite Wealth centers around Ichiban Kasuga, the protagonist of Yakuza: Like a Dragon (2020), and Kazuma Kiryu, the previous main protagonist of the series, as both of them are trying to find Kasuga's mother in Hawaii. It is the first game in the series to have settings outside Japan, allowing the player to explore areas of both the United States and Japan at different points in the game.

Like a Dragon: Infinite Wealth was released for PlayStation 4, PlayStation 5, Windows, Xbox One, and Xbox Series X/S on January 26, 2024. It received positive reviews from critics. The game was followed by a spin-off, Like a Dragon: Pirate Yakuza in Hawaii, in 2025.

== Gameplay ==
In Like a Dragon: Infinite Wealth, players control Ichiban Kasuga and Kazuma Kiryu, and their respective party members, as they explore the Isezaki Ijincho district of Yokohama, and Honolulu City in Hawaii. The Kamurochō district, a primary location from previous Like a Dragon titles, is featured as a third location. Similar to Yakuza: Like a Dragon, the game also has turn-based combat system for all playable characters.

The combat system, called the "Live Command RPG" Battle System, is similar to the previous entry, being turn-based combat, requiring the player to select actions for up to four party members on their respective turns in order to attack or defend. Unlike Yakuza: Like a Dragon, however, playable characters now possess a ring denoting their area of movement, allowing the player to freely move them within the ring during their turn. The positioning of characters influences combat in various ways: attacking near an enemy or from behind deals additional damage, objects near the character can be used in attacks, enemies can be knocked into other foes, attacking an enemy near a party member can cause them to add an additional attack. Character Skills show their area of effect, range, and direction. Hype Meter is added as a resource for all party members excluding Kasuga, that allows them to use team-up attacks with Kasuga in combat. Kasuga can perform an "Ultimate Tag Team" skill that uses all available party members' Hype Meters for larger damage. The game adds the ability to instantly defeat weaker enemies in the overworld, with reduced rewards. Returning from Yakuza: Like a Dragon, the Poundmates mechanic allows the player to summon non-player characters as supporting party members during fights in exchange for money, which allows them to act in combat without the player's input.

Similar to the previous entry, each character can choose from various character classes which are themed after real-world jobs, which have different abilities, statistics, and equipment. The game includes both new and returning jobs; all party members have at least one unique job, and male and female characters have different job selections. Kiryu's unique job, "Dragon of Dojima", provides him with the ability to switch between multiple fighting styles, and allows him to use his Hype Meter to temporarily perform real-time combat, similar to the brawler gameplay from previous Like a Dragon titles.

In addition to combat, the game features open world exploration throughout its three cities. During exploration, the player can encounter enemies, engage in sidequests which are called "sub-stories", collect items, raise bonds with party members, and play various minigames. Several minigames from previous entries return, such as Karaoke, Darts, Mahjong, and arcade games, including Virtua Fighter 3tb, Sega Bass Fishing, and SpikeOut. Infinite Wealth also introduces several minigames including Crazy Delivery, a food delivery game parodying Sega's Crazy Taxi franchise; Sujimon Battle, a Pokémon parody where certain enemies can be recruited for use in said battles; and Miss Match, a dating app for Kasuga. A major side activity, Dondoko Island, has the player manage a resort island, combining objectives such as resource gathering, crafting, and social interactions. Kiryu can complete his Bucket List, a series of tasks which involve Kiryu reminiscing his past, and reuniting with characters from previous Like a Dragon titles.

== Synopsis ==
=== Premise ===
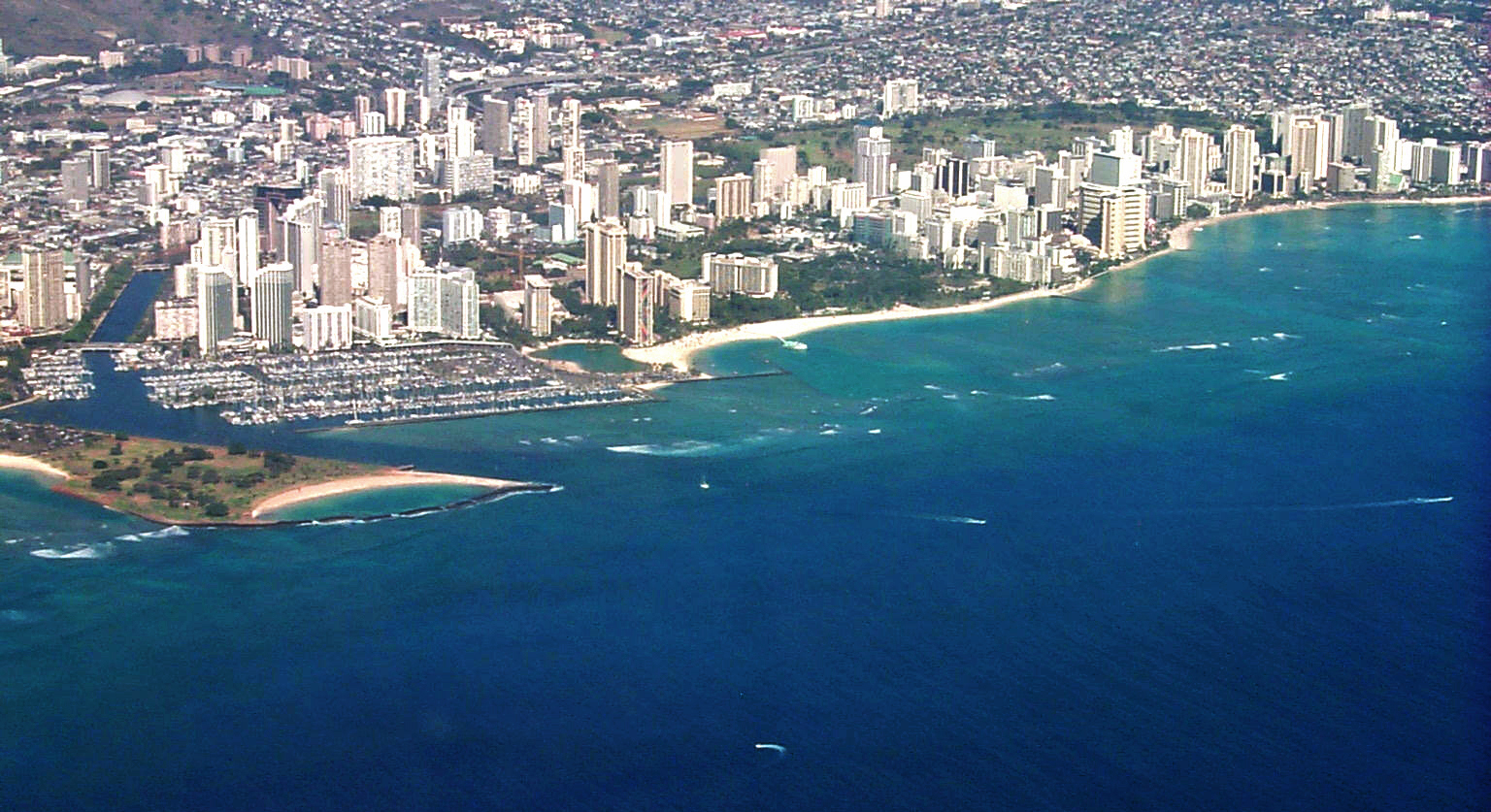
Honolulu, Hawaii, United States, a major setting in Infinite Wealth and the franchise's first setting outside of Japan

Like a Dragon: Infinite Wealth primarily takes place in 2023, and follows former Tojo Clan yakuza members Ichiban Kasuga (Kazuhiro Nakaya/Kaiji Tang) and Kazuma Kiryu (Takaya Kuroda/Yong Yea) (Note: Topher Ngo is Kazuma Kiryu's singing voice for the English dub.) as they embark on an adventure in Isezaki Ijincho, Yokohama and Honolulu, Hawaii. Following a tip from a former ally, Kasuga travels to Honolulu in search of his biological mother, Akane Kishida (Yoshiko Sakakibara/Patti Yasutake), who he thought had died many years ago. Also looking for Akane for different reasons, Kiryu teams up with Kasuga to find and protect her from various local criminal organizations as a larger, international conspiracy unearths.

Kasuga's party members from Yakuza: Like a Dragon return, including: Yu Nanba (Ken Yasuda/Greg Chun), Koichi Adachi (Akio Otsuka/Andrew Morgado), Saeko Mukoda (Sumire Uesaka/Elizabeth Maxwell), Tianyou Zhao (Nobuhiko Okamoto/Robbie Daymond), and Joongi Han (Yuichi Nakamura/Keong Sim). New party members in Infinite Wealth include Seonhee (Hana Takeda/Fiona Rene), leader of the Ijincho-based Geomijul syndicate and Yokohama Liumang gang, and a supporting character from the previous game; Eric Tomizawa (Satoru Iguchi/Matthew Yang King), a local taxi driver in Hawaii; and Chitose Fujinomiya (Anju Inami/Suzie Yeung), the heiress of a wealthy family who works part-time as Akane's personal maid.

Other major characters include: Jo Sawashiro (Shinichi Tsutsumi/Brian Bloom (Note: Although social media posts by the studio prior to the game's release stated that Ian Anthony Dale voices Sawashiro, the credits in the game proper state that Bloom voices Sawashiro.)), the former captain of the Tojo Clan's Arakawa Family and one of Kasuga's adversaries from the previous game; Eiji Mitamura (Ryo Narita/Aleks Le), a wheelchair-using engineer who Kasuga meets and befriends at Honolulu; Masataka Ebina (Hiroki Hasegawa/Daniel Dae Kim), captain and acting chairman of the Ijincho-based Seiryu Clan; Yutaka Yamai (Takehito Koyasu/Andrew Kishino), a disgraced Tojo Clan yakuza who forms his own group, the Yamai Syndicate, in Hawaii; Dwight Méndez (Shuhei Matsuda/Danny Trejo), (Note: Maxwell Powers voices Dwight's English dialogue in the Japanese audio.) leader of the Hawaiian Barracudas gang; Wong Tou (Takuya Matsumoto/Rich Ting), commander of the Chinese Ganzhe Mafia; Bryce Fairchild (Tōru Furuya/Chris Parson), the head of Palekana, a Hawaiian religious group; and Lani Mililani (Atsumi Tanezaki/Justine Lee), a young Hawaiian girl who is also targeted by the various gangs, and sheltered by Akane.

Infinite Wealth features a variety of returning characters introduced prior to Yakuza: Like a Dragon, appearing either in the main story or as part of Kiryu's "Bucket List" side story content. Returning major characters from the series include: Goro Majima (Hidenari Ugaki/Matthew Mercer), Taiga Saejima (Rikiya Koyama/Ron Yuan), Daigo Dojima (Satoshi Tokushige/Tim Friedlander), Osamu Kashiwagi (Shunsuke Sakuya/David Hayter), Makoto Date (Kazuhiro Yamaji/Bill Farmer), Shun Akiyama (Koichi Yamadera/Stephen Fu), and Haruka Sawamura (Rie Kugimiya/Xanthe Huynh).

=== Plot ===
In 2022, three years after the Tojo Clan and Omi Alliance's joint dissolution, (Note: As depicted in Yakuza: Like a Dragon and Like a Dragon Gaiden: The Man Who Erased His Name.) ex-yakuza Ichiban Kasuga is an employee at Hello Work, an employment agency in Isezaki Ijincho, Yokohama, determined to carry on his father Masumi Arakawa's legacy by helping ex-yakuza find legitimate work. By 2023, VTuber Hisoka Tatara spreads false rumors of Kasuga building his own crime ring, which causes Kasuga and his friends Yu Nanba and Koichi Adachi to become unemployed. A month later, they learn that the Seiryu Clan has been recruiting ex-yakuza en masse. They infiltrate the Seiryu Clan HQ and meet their Acting Chairman, Masataka Ebina, who reveals that he is hiring ex-yakuza into a legitimate waste management business and that he is organizing a "Second Great Dissolution" to disband the remaining yakuza clans across Japan. Ebina informs them that he is working with Jo Sawashiro, who has been released from prison after being proven innocent, with the former's help, in the murder of the previous Seiryu Clan Chairman Ryuhei Hoshino. (Note: As depicted in Yakuza: Like a Dragon.) Sawashiro reveals to Kasuga that his biological mother, Akane Kishida, is alive and has been living in Honolulu, Hawaii, and asks Kasuga to meet her.

Upon arriving in Hawaii, Kasuga befriends the wheelchair-using engineer Eiji Mitamura. Kasuga has run-ins with taxi driver Eric Tomizawa, who attempts to rob him, and later with Akane's maid and exchange student Chitose Fujinomiya, who strips him naked and steals his passport. Kasuga is arrested by police and escapes; he is then saved by Kazuma Kiryu, who is looking for Akane per the Daidoji faction's orders. While investigating Akane's house, Kasuga and Kiryu are confronted by the Yamai Syndicate and their patriarch, Yutaka Yamai, who is also searching for Akane. Tomizawa, who is coerced to work for Yamai, defects to Kasuga's side. Kasuga's group discovers that Chitose used Kasuga's passport to hide within District Five, home of the Barracudas gang. Kiryu reveals that he has cancer, contracted from an accident at a nuclear waste disposal plant in 2020, and he has only six months left to live.

The party infiltrates District Five and finds Chitose, who joins them to confront the Barracudas leader Dwight Méndez. Gaining intel from Chitose, the party discovers that Akane was part of a religious charity group called Palekana and that two of Hawaii's largest gangs, the Barracudas and the Chinese Ganzhe Mafia, are also after Akane. With assistance from Kiryu's handler Kihei Hanawa, Kasuga confronts Wong Tou, the Ganzhe's commander, and learns that the Barracudas and the Ganzhe are secretly controlled by Bryce Fairchild, the Sage of Palekana and "the Overseer" of Hawaii's underworld. Bryce is hunting down Akane to find Lani, a young girl currently under her protection. Wong is then betrayed by a spy, forcing Kasuga's group to escort Wong to safety, while Kiryu is captured by Yamai. Nanba and Adachi, having arrived in Hawaii, join Kasuga to confront Yamai, who was providing medical care to Kiryu out of respect. Learning of Bryce's true objective, Yamai calls off pursuing Akane. Kiryu returns to Japan with Nanba for recovery, while Kasuga confronts Bryce, who escapes.

Returning to Kasuga's apartment in Ijincho, Nanba is joined by Geomijul and Yokohama Liumang leader Seonhee, and hostess club owner Saeko Mukoda in helping Kiryu recover and manage his condition. Seonhee is later informed that the Seiryu Clan is planning to expand its waste management operations to Hawaii. Kiryu meets Ebina and Sawashiro at the former Tojo Clan Headquarters, where Ebina reveals he got the idea for his waste management business from Palekana, who runs a similar business on Nele Island and plans to partner with them. However, they claim they have no knowledge of Palekana hunting Akane. Later, Tatara publicly exposes Kiryu's survival and claims he plans to resurrect the Tojo Clan, seemingly corroborated by Ebina and Sawashiro.

Kasuga tracks Akane and Lani hiding in a yacht offshore. En route to a Daidoji safehouse, Akane reveals that Lani is the last surviving member of the Mililani family, the true successor to the title of Sage of Palekana, and that Bryce usurped the position by murdering the previous Sage. Upon reaching the safehouse, Chitose reveals that Eiji is a Seiryu Clan spy, who faked his disability to gain Kasuga's trust. The Barracudas raid the safehouse, killing Hanawa and Wong, while Eiji escapes with Lani. Chitose then confesses that she is Tatara, having been blackmailed by Eiji to spread online accusations against ex-yakuza across the country and serve as a spy on Kasuga's party. Kasuga focuses on rescuing Lani, while Kiryu focuses on Sawashiro.

Former Liumang leader Tianyou Zhao allies with Kiryu as they confront Sawashiro, who reveals that he has been secretly working behind Ebina's back to actually carry out the dissolution. Sawashiro realizes that Ebina's plan is a ruse after sending Kasuga to Hawaii, in order to expose Akane as a favor for Bryce. Ebina plans to make a deal with Bryce to store all of Japan's accumulated nuclear waste on Nele Island, allowing the government to resume Japan's nuclear industry. Sawashiro and Kiryu, however, share the belief that there's an ulterior motive behind Ebina's plans. Kasuga learns from surviving Daidoji agents that Eiji used to be a reporter who was framed by the Arakawa family for a hit-and-run and previously joined non-profit organization Bleach Japan to enact vengeance on the yakuza. Chitose makes amends with the party as they attempt to rescue Lani, but fail as Eiji flees with her.

Sawashiro sends Kiryu to Tojo Clan leaders Daigo Dojima, Taiga Saejima, and Goro Majima to expedite the dissolution. Kiryu meets them, where they reveal that a prior Tatara Channel exposé on their ex-yakuza employees shut down their security company. Daigo also reveals that Ebina may be Arakawa's illegitimate son and Kasuga's half-brother. Fearing another failure, Daigo, Saejima, and Majima refuse to help Sawashiro. Tatara, replaced with a substitute by Eiji, exposes the meeting, causing public backlash and a manhunt for Kiryu. That night, Tatara holds a live stream at the former Tojo HQ with Ebina and Sawashiro, where Ebina announces his deal with Palekana, the dissolution of the Seiryu Clan, the reformation of Bleach Japan, and his plan to pass their yakuza rehabilitation program to the government. Kiryu's team raids the former Tojo HQ, but find that the live stream was pre-recorded.

Joongi Han, Seonhee's right-hand man, arrives in Hawaii to help Kasuga infiltrate Nele Island. Kasuga's party investigates a secret passage within District Five, which leads to a hidden port heading to Nele Island. Lani is rescued from the Barracudas, and with Yamai's help, the party, Lani and Akane escape to Japan. Having failed Bryce, Dwight attempts to escape but is eaten by a shark. Upon arriving in Japan, the party is greeted by Kiryu's friend, Detective Makoto Date, who reveals that in exchange for a passage back to Japan, Yamai would confess to the murder of Shuji Tabata, Yamai's former patriarch. Yamai bids the clan's matriarch farewell and turns himself in.

With Lani and Akane safe in Japan, Kasuga and Kiryu regroup in Ijincho, where Ebina contacts them, saying that the rehabilitation program has been approved by the government, then reveals that he has Sawashiro hostage at the Millennium Tower in Kamurocho, Tokyo. The group then splits up: Kasuga's group returns to Hawaii to stop Bryce, while Kiryu's group assaults the Millennium Tower with Daigo, Saejima, and Majima's assistance. In Hawaii, Kasuga's team assaults Nele Island and discover a natural cave filled with barrels of nuclear waste, revealing Palekana's waste disposal facility as a lie. Kasuga confronts Bryce, who reveals his plan to use the island to store many nations' darkest secrets and gain global influence. Kasuga defeats him, and Chitose livestreams the entire facility's nuclear waste and confesses to being Tatara.

Kiryu's team confronts Ebina and find a barely living Sawashiro. Having a grudge against Arakawa and the entire yakuza, Ebina reveals his actual plan behind the Palekana deal: to force the yakuza to work on Nele Island's nuclear waste disposal, slowly torturing and killing them with radiation poisoning. Kiryu defeats Ebina, and as he sympathizes with his anger, begs him to give the yakuza a chance to atone. Kiryu then falls unconscious and is evacuated to a hospital. Meanwhile, Kasuga tracks down an injured Eiji hiding in Kamurocho, and convinces him to turn himself in.

A month later, the public has largely moved on from the Seiryu/Palekana controversy. Tomizawa devotes more time to helping the homeless in Hawaii, Chitose becomes the chairwoman of her family business, and Lani assumes her role as Sage to rebuild Palekana with Akane's assistance. Kasuga attempts to properly confess his feelings for Saeko, but inadvertently embarrasses her by wearing a t-shirt celebrating their relationship. Meanwhile, Kiryu's adopted daughter Haruka Sawamura and her son Haruto visit Kiryu at the hospital just as he's about to receive treatment. When the doctor asks to confirm his name, Kiryu answers with his real name.

== Development and promotion ==
Like a Dragon: Infinite Wealth was announced in September 2022 during Ryu Ga Gotoku Studio's Summit livestream, initially named Like a Dragon 8. The first announcement trailer featured voiceover from various characters in the game, followed by the on-screen appearance of both Ichiban Kasuga and Kazuma Kiryu. Kiryu's design was highlighted due to his character design being changed compared to past appearances.

In early 2023, RGG Studio hosted a Cabaret Club Grand Prix competition, in which five models were chosen to appear as live-action hostesses for the cabaret club minigame in Like a Dragon Gaiden: The Man Who Erased His Name, while the Grand Prix winner was chosen to appear as an in-game character in Infinite Wealth. Among the five finalists, livestreamer and VTuber Kson won the competition. Her character, Kei, appears as a minor character who works at Revolve Bar, a hangout spot for the player characters.

In addition to Kson, Infinite Wealth features several Japanese celebrities making in-game appearances, including MMA fighter and YouTuber Mikuru Asakura, TV announcer Risa Unai, Utamaru of the hip-hop group Rhymester, weather reporters Saya Hiyama and Yui Komaki, and the TV characters Gachapin and Mukku.

A second trailer was shown at Xbox Games Showcase 2023, teasing a new setting outside of Japan, while also confirming the new title. RGG Studio Head Masayoshi Yokoyama explained the Infinite Wealth subtitle as a direct tie to the themes in the story, and also as a differentiation between the international version of the game and its Japanese release, which is titled Ryū ga Gotoku 8.

In September 2023, RGG Studio hosted a second Summit livestream, detailing the story and characters, as well as the gameplay features of Infinite Wealth via two new trailers. The studio also revealed Japanese cast members of the game, and announced actors Danny Trejo and Daniel Dae Kim as part of the English voice cast. In addition to the English dub, for the first time in the series, a Chinese dub is also available for Infinite Wealth, with karaoke songs sung in Chinese by the Chinese voice cast, with lyrics shown in Chinese pinyin (on all languages, besides Simplified Chinese and Traditional Chinese, which now displays Traditional Chinese lyrics if the voices are set to Japanese; Simplified Chinese lyrics will be displayed when playing with Japanese, Simplified Chinese or Traditional Chinese text if the voices are set to Chinese).

In October 2023, RGG Studio unveiled Happy Resort Dondoko Island, a side activity featured in Infinite Wealth, as part of Xbox Partner Preview livestream. In December 2023, the studio released a trailer for the Bucket List story, noting it as a major side activity for Kiryu in Infinite Wealth.

Infinite Wealth features the song "Ariamaru Tomi" (The Invaluable) by Ringo Sheena as its theme song. Yokoyama stated that Sheena's music had a major influence on him during development of the story, leading to him requesting her song for inclusion in the game.

== Release ==
Like a Dragon: Infinite Wealth was released for PlayStation 4, PlayStation 5, Windows, Xbox One, and Xbox Series X/S on January 26, 2024. A special trial version for the game is included with the spin-off title Like a Dragon Gaiden: The Man Who Erased His Name, released on November 9, 2023, available after beating the game's main story for the first time.

== Reception ==
Reception

Aggregate scores
Aggregator	Score
Metacritic	PC: 89/100; PS5: 89/100; XSXS: 92/100
OpenCritic	96% recommend (Note: Based on 165 reviews)

Review scores
Publication	Score
Destructoid	8/10
Eurogamer	4/5
Famitsu	10/10, 10/10, 10/10, 10/10
Game Informer	8.5/10
GameSpot	8/10
GamesRadar+	4/5
IGN	9/10
PC Gamer (US)	80/100
PCGamesN	9/10
Push Square	9/10
Shacknews	10/10

Like a Dragon: Infinite Wealth received "generally favorable reviews" from critics for the PC and PS5 versions, while the Xbox Series X/S version received "universal acclaim", according to review aggregator website Metacritic.

Eric Van Allen for Destructoid praised the game for the range of activities on offer, and the character-focused story, although felt that while they like much of the game, "some portions feel way more fleshed out, and others feel like they drag the median down." Michael Higham for GameSpot praised the game for handling heavy tones, but felt it lost focus over the course of the narrative.

Writing for IGN, Tristan Ogilvie praised the improvements to the combat system, remarking that it "delivers a riotous level of chaos and carnage that makes its predecessor's more modest turn-taking seem almost polite by comparison."

Famitsu awarded the game a score of 40/40, making it the thirtieth game overall to receive a perfect score. This is the second game in the Like a Dragon series to receive a perfect score, after Yakuza 5.

=== Sales ===
Like a Dragon: Infinite Wealth sold one million copies both digitally and physically in the first week after its release.

By June 2025, Like a Dragon: Infinite Wealth sold 1.66 million units, selling 1.18 million units in 2024's fiscal year and 480 thousand units in 2025.

=== Awards ===
Year	Ceremony	Category	Result	Ref.
2023	The Game Awards 2023	Most Anticipated Game	Nominated	
2024	Japan Game Awards 2024	Award for Excellence	Won	
2024	Golden Joystick Awards	Best Storytelling	Nominated	
2024	Golden Joystick Awards	Best Lead Performer (Kaiji Tang)	Nominated	
2024	The Game Awards 2024	Best Narrative	Nominated	
2024	The Game Awards 2024	Best Role-Playing Game	Nominated	
2025	28th Annual D.I.C.E. Awards	Role-Playing Game of the Year	Nominated	
2025	25th Game Developers Choice Awards	Game of the Year	Honorable mention	
2025	25th Game Developers Choice Awards	Best Narrative	Nominated	
2025	Seiyu Award	Best Game Voice Acting	Won	
