= List of party video games =

This is a chronological list of party video games. The genre features a collection of minigames, designed to be intuitive and easy to control, and allow for competition between many players.

Title	Year released	Platform
Olympic Decathlon	1980	TRS-80, Apple II, IBM PC
Party Mix	1983	Atari 2600
Anticipation	1988	Nintendo Entertainment System
Taboo: The Sixth Sense	1989	Nintendo Entertainment System
Itadaki Street	1991	Nintendo Family Computer
Sonic the Hedgehog's Gameworld	1993	Sega Pico
Tails and the Music Maker	1994	Sega Pico
You Don't Know Jack	1995	Windows 3.1, Windows 95, Macintosh
Timon & Pumbaa's Jungle Games	1995	Microsoft Windows, Super NES
Sailor Moon Sailor Stars Tokimeki Party	1997	Sega Pico
Getter Love!!	1998	Nintendo 64
Bomberman Party Edition	1998	PlayStation, PlayStation Network
Mario Party	1998	Nintendo 64
South Park: Chef's Luv Shack	1999	Nintendo 64, Dreamcast, Microsoft Windows, PlayStation
Mario Party 2	1999	Nintendo 64
The Jungle Book Groove Party	2000	PlayStation, Microsoft Windows, PlayStation 2
Crash Bash	2000	PlayStation
Sonic Shuffle	2000	Dreamcast
Mario Party 3	2000	Nintendo 64
Super Monkey Ball	2001	GameCube
Fuzion Frenzy	2001	Xbox
Rayman Arena	2001	GameCube
Universal Studios Theme Parks Adventure	2001	GameCube
Rayman Rush	2002	PlayStation
Super Monkey Ball 2	2002	GameCube
Pac-Man Fever	2002	GameCube, PlayStation 2
Whacked!	2002	Xbox
Mario Party 4	2002	GameCube
Nickelodeon Party Blast	2002	Xbox, GameCube, Microsoft Windows
Rugrats: I Gotta Go Party	2002	Game Boy Advance
Shrek Super Party	2002	PlayStation 2, GameCube, Xbox
My Street	2003	PlayStation 2
Polly Pocket! Super Splash Island	2003	Game Boy Advance
Mario Party 5	2003	GameCube
Muppets Party Cruise	2003	GameCube, PlayStation 2
Ape Escape: Pumped & Primed	2004	PlayStation 2
Cartoon Network: Block Party	2004	Game Boy Advance
Sega SuperStars	2004	PlayStation 2
Mario Party 6	2004	GameCube
Ape Escape Academy	2004	PlayStation Portable
Mario Party Advance	2005	Game Boy Advance
Super Monkey Ball Deluxe	2005	Xbox, PlayStation 2
SpongeBob SquarePants: Lights, Camera, Pants!	2005	Xbox, PlayStation 2, GameCube
Mario Party 7	2005	GameCube
One Piece: Pirates' Carnival	2005	PlayStation 2, GameCube
Super Monkey Ball: Touch & Roll	2005	Nintendo DS
Every Party	2005	Xbox 360
Crash Boom Bang!	2006	Nintendo DS
Super Monkey Ball: Banana Blitz	2006	Wii
Rayman Raving Rabbids	2006	Game Boy Advance, Wii, Xbox 360, Microsoft Windows, Nintendo DS
Tamagotchi Party On!	2006	Wii
Wii Play	2006	Wii
WarioWare: Smooth Moves	2006	Wii
Sonic and the Secret Rings	2007	Wii
Fuzion Frenzy 2	2007	Xbox 360
Mario Party 8	2007	Wii
LOL	2007	Nintendo DS
Carnival Games	2007	Wii, Nintendo DS
Jackass: The Game	2007	PlayStation 2, Nintendo DS, PlayStation Portable
Viva Piñata: Party Animals	2007	Xbox 360
Mario Party DS	2007	Nintendo DS
Rayman Raving Rabbids 2	2007	Wii, Nintendo DS, Microsoft Windows
Game Party	2007	Wii
Doraemon Wii - Himitsu Douguou Ketteisen	2007	Wii
Rocky and Bullwinkle	2008	Xbox 360 (XBLA)
Hail to the Chimp	2008	Xbox 360, PlayStation 3
Wonder World Amusement Park	2008	Wii
Rayman Raving Rabbids TV Party	2008	Wii, Nintendo DS
Family Pirate Party	2009	Wii (WiiWare)
Family & Friends Party	2009	Wii (WiiWare)
M&M's Beach Party	2009	Wii (WiiWare)
5 Spots Party	2009	Wii (WiiWare)
Birthday Party Bash	2009	Wii
101-in-1 Party Megamix	2009	Wii, PlayStation Portable, Nintendo DS
We Wish You a Merry Christmas	2009	Wii
Hubert the Teddy Bear: Winter Games	2010	Wii (WiiWare)
Oops! Prank Party	2010	Wii
Wii Party	2010	Wii
The Garfield Show: Threat of the Space Lasagna	2010	Wii, PC
Super Monkey Ball: Step & Roll	2010	Wii
Guilty Party	2010	Wii
Start the Party!	2010	PlayStation 3
Club Penguin: Game Day!	2010	Wii
New Carnival Games	2010	Wii, Nintendo DS
Disney Channel All Star Party	2010	Wii
Pac-Man Party	2010	Wii, Nintendo 3DS, Windows Mobile 7
Raving Rabbids: Travel in Time	2010	Wii
You Don't Know Jack	2011	Wii, Nintendo DS, PlayStation 3, Xbox 360, Windows
Super Monkey Ball 3D	2011	Nintendo 3DS
We Dare	2011	PlayStation 3, Wii
Rio	2011	Wii, PlayStation 3, Xbox 360
Wii Play: Motion	2011	Wii
Go Vacation	2011	Wii, Nintendo Switch
Rabbids: Alive & Kicking	2011	Xbox 360
Fortune Street	2011	Wii
Mario Party 9	2012	Wii
El Chavo	2012	Wii
Nintendo Land	2012	Wii U
Sing Party	2012	Wii U
Rabbids Land	2012	Wii U
Family Party: 30 Great Games Obstacle Arcade	2012	Wii U
Super Monkey Ball: Banana Splitz	2012	PlayStation Vita
Game & Wario	2013	Wii U
GamePigeon	2013	iOS
Wii Party U	2013	Wii U
Barbie Dreamhouse Party	2013	Nintendo DS, Wii, Nintendo 3DS, Nintendo Wii U
Mario Party: Island Tour	2013	Nintendo 3DS
Fibbage	2014	Microsoft Windows, macOS, Linux, PlayStation 3, PlayStation 4, Xbox 360, Xbox One, Nintendo Switch
The Jackbox Party Pack	2014	Microsoft Windows, macOS, Linux, PlayStation 3, PlayStation 4, Xbox 360, Xbox One, Nintendo Switch
Town of Salem	2014	Microsoft Windows, macOS, iOS, Android
Mario Party 10	2015	Wii U
Quiplash	2015	Microsoft Windows, macOS, Linux, PlayStation 3, PlayStation 4, Xbox 360, Xbox One, Nintendo Switch
Keep Talking and Nobody Explodes	2015	Microsoft Windows, OS X, PlayStation 4
The Jackbox Party Pack 2	2015	Microsoft Windows, macOS, Linux, PlayStation 3, PlayStation 4, Xbox One, Nintendo Switch
Animal Crossing: Amiibo Festival	2015	Wii U
Drawful 2	2016	Microsoft Windows, macOS, Linux, PlayStation 4, Xbox One, Nintendo Switch
Tricky Towers	2016	Microsoft Windows, OS X, Linux, PlayStation 4
Overcooked	2016	Microsoft Windows, Xbox One, PlayStation 4, Nintendo Switch
Party Golf	2016	PlayStation 4, Microsoft Windows, Nintendo Switch
Mario Party: Star Rush	2016	Nintendo 3DS
The Jackbox Party Pack 3	2016	Microsoft Windows, macOS, Linux, PlayStation 4, Xbox One, Android, Apple TV, Nintendo Switch
Tower Unite	2016	Microsoft Windows
1-2-Switch	2017	Nintendo Switch
The Jackbox Party Pack 4	2017	Microsoft Windows, macOS, Linux, PlayStation 4, Xbox One, Android, Apple TV, Nintendo Switch
Mario Party: The Top 100	2017	Nintendo 3DS
Party Panic	2017	Microsoft Windows, macOS, Linux
Scribblenauts Showdown	2018	Nintendo Switch, PlayStation 4, Xbox One
Among Us	2018	iOS, Android, Microsoft Windows
Overcooked 2	2018	Microsoft Windows, Xbox One, PlayStation 4, Nintendo Switch, macOS, Linux
Bonkies	2018	Microsoft Windows, Xbox One, PlayStation 4, Nintendo Switch
Pummel Party	2018	Microsoft Windows
Super Mario Party	2018	Nintendo Switch
The Jackbox Party Pack 5	2018	Microsoft Windows, macOS, Linux, PlayStation 4, Xbox One, Android, Apple TV, Nintendo Switch
Super Monkey Ball: Banana Blitz HD	2019	Nintendo Switch, PlayStation 4, Xbox One, Windows
Alien League	2019	Microsoft Windows
The Jackbox Party Pack 6	2019	Microsoft Windows, macOS, Linux, PlayStation 4, Xbox One, Android, Apple TV, Nintendo Switch
Clubhouse Games: 51 Worldwide Classics	2020	Nintendo Switch
The Jackbox Party Pack 7	2020	Microsoft Windows, macOS, Linux, PlayStation 4, Xbox One, Android, Apple TV, Nintendo Switch
WarioWare: Get It Together!	2021	Nintendo Switch
The Jackbox Party Pack 8	2021	Microsoft Windows, macOS, Linux, PlayStation 4, PlayStation 5, Xbox One, Xbox Series X/S, Android, Apple TV, Nintendo Switch
Mario Party Superstars	2021	Nintendo Switch
Super Monkey Ball: Banana Mania	2021	Nintendo Switch, PlayStation 4, PlayStation 5, Windows, Xbox One, Xbox Series X/S
Crab Game	2021	Microsoft Windows, macOS, Linux
The Jackbox Party Starter	2022	Microsoft Windows, macOS, Linux, PlayStation 4, PlayStation 5, Xbox One, Xbox Series X/S, Android, Apple TV, Nintendo Switch
Kirby's Dream Buffet	2022	Nintendo Switch
The Jackbox Party Pack 9	2022	Microsoft Windows, macOS, Linux, PlayStation 4, PlayStation 5, Xbox One, Xbox Series X/S, Android, Apple TV, Nintendo Switch
Town of Salem 2	2023	Microsoft Windows, macOS
Everybody 1-2-Switch!	2023	Nintendo Switch
The Jackbox Party Pack 10	2023	Microsoft Windows, macOS, Linux, PlayStation 4, PlayStation 5, Xbox One, Xbox Series X/S, Android, Apple TV, Nintendo Switch
Demon Slayer: Kimetsu no Yaiba - Sweep the Board!	2024	Nintendo Switch, PlayStation 4, PlayStation 5, Xbox One, Xbox Series X, Microsoft Windows
The Jackbox Naughty Pack	2024	Microsoft Windows, macOS, Linux, PlayStation 4, PlayStation 5, Xbox One, Xbox Series X/S, Android, Apple TV, Nintendo Switch
The Jackbox Survey Scramble	2024	Microsoft Windows, macOS, Linux, PlayStation 4, PlayStation 5, Xbox One, Xbox Series X/S, Android, Apple TV, Nintendo Switch
Super Mario Party Jamboree	2024	Nintendo Switch
LEGO Party!	2025	Nintendo Switch, PlayStation 4, PlayStation 5, Xbox One, Xbox Series X, Microsoft Windows
The Jackbox Party Pack 11	2025	Microsoft Windows, macOS, Linux, PlayStation 4, PlayStation 5, Xbox One, Xbox Series X/S, Android, Apple TV, Nintendo Switch, Nintendo Switch 2
