= Toshihiro Nagoshi =

Japanese video game designer (born 1965)

- 名越 稔洋
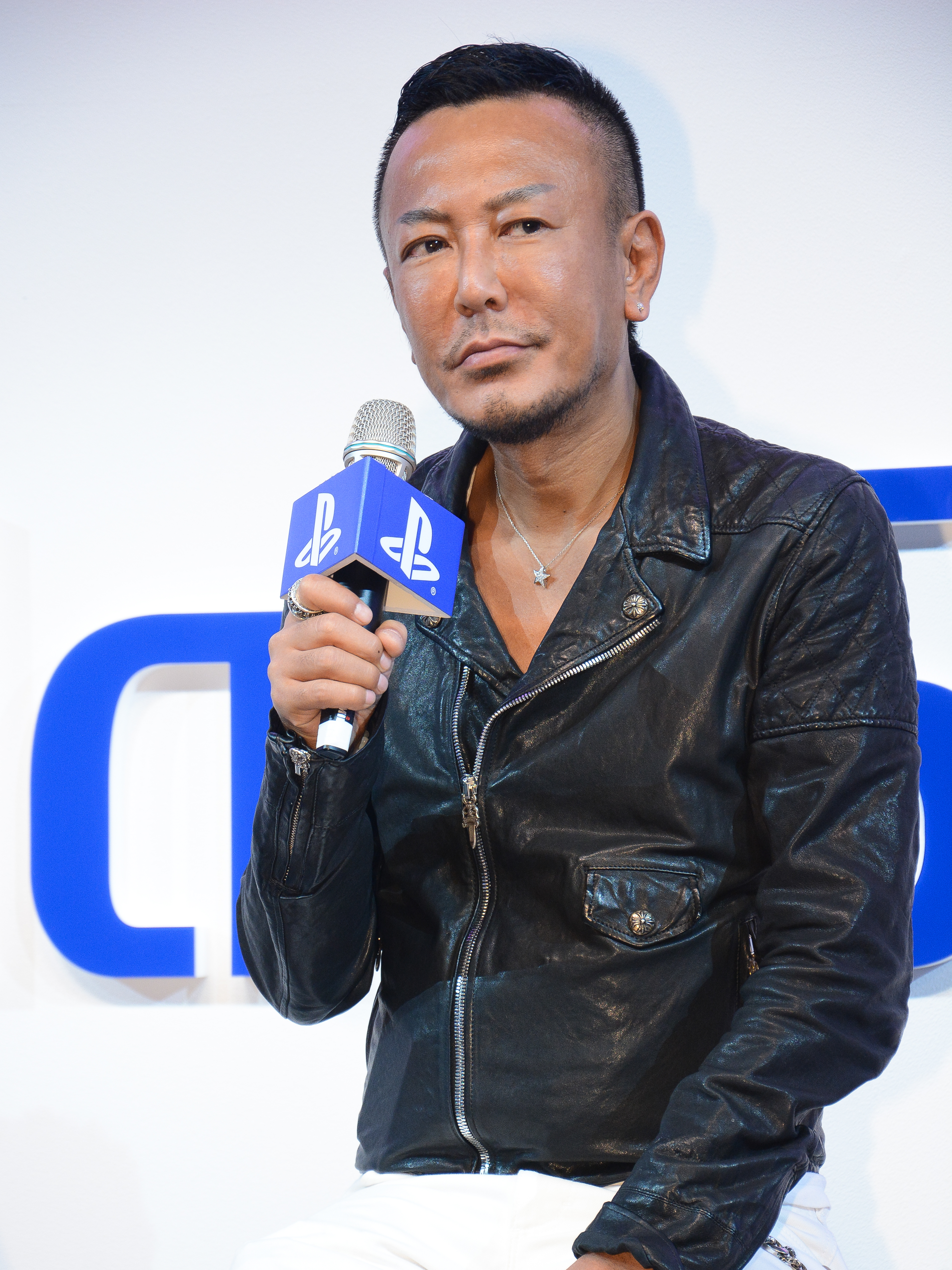
- Nagoshi in 2014
- Born: June 17, 1965 (age 61); Shimonoseki, Yamaguchi, Japan
- Education: Tokyo Zokei University
- Occupations: Game producer, designer, director
- Years active: 1989–present
- Employer(s): Sega (1989–2021); Nagoshi Studio (2021–2026)
- Known for: Super Monkey Ball series Yakuza series Daytona USA; F-Zero GX; Binary Domain

Toshihiro Nagoshi (Japanese: 名越 稔洋, Hepburn: Nagoshi Toshihiro; born June 17, 1965) is a Japanese video game producer, director, and designer. He was the chief creative officer for Sega until 2021 when he became creative director. He went on to be the general director of Ryu Ga Gotoku Studio, and later became a member of the board of directors for Atlus. He joined Sega in 1989 as a graphic artist and later transitioned into director and producer roles.

After working at Sega for thirty years, Nagoshi became the owner of Nagoshi Studio in 2021. Nagoshi Studio was shut down in 2026, after owner NetEase Games reportedly pulled funding.

== Career ==
=== Working at Sega AM2 ===
Nagoshi graduated from Tokyo Zokei University with a degree in movie production and joined Sega shortly thereafter, working for the second arcade department (AM2) under Yu Suzuki as a graphic artist.

His first title as a lead artist was Virtua Racing. It was then when he found his niche at Sega due to his study of movies being useful at adjusting and implementing the right camera angles in early 3D games; this was a major turning point for him at Sega. Before that point, he stated, "It really didn't take long for me to feel like I had come to the wrong place. But when I said I was lucky before, it's because during the time I began working, 2D was on its way out, and the industry was switching to 3D." According to Nagoshi, despite the fact the change to 3D had occurred, "nobody had actually studied the techniques needed to work in a 3D space." He knew the basics and gave them advice; it was easier for him to apply his knowledge after the transition to 3D took place.

Afterwards, he worked on Daytona USA, where he was made director. He came into this role after managing to produce a preview movie of the game for an arcade show. Daytona USA was the first game to use the Sega Model 2 arcade hardware which produced very advanced graphics and was developed jointly with General Electrics, which was located in the US. When Nagoshi paid them a visit, he happened to see a NASCAR race, which inspired Daytona USA initially. Tom Petit, president of Sega's arcade division in America also was in favour of NASCAR. In Japan, only F1 racing games were popular, though Nagoshi decided to not develop one. He also says that he stayed persistent in creating a more difficult kind of game. The development of Daytona USA brought great responsibility for Nagoshi as he was promoted into leadership positions relatively fast.

His next project, Scud Race, became once again a very technologically advanced game, however due to expenses, made less money than Daytona USA, though still made profit. Afterwards, he mentioned he did not want to make any racing games anymore, thinking that he graduated from the genre. Next, he worked on Spikeout, a cooperative beat em 'up with up to four players. It was well received by players, although arcade operators complained that it didn't bring in much money, due to the players not needing many credits if they properly work together.

Shenmue was the last time he worked with AM2 and Yu Suzuki. He first was a supervisor on the project but was dissatisfied with how the game went and asked for his own development division, which later became Amusement Vision. However, he was called in by the CEO at the time to get the game finished, and as a result, he had to serve as producer and director on the final months of development. The CEO knew that Nagoshi was the only person that Suzuki trusted. Nagoshi has said that there is no developer that he learnt more from than Suzuki.

=== CEO of Amusement Vision ===
In 2000, Sega restructured its arcade and console development teams into nine semi-autonomous studios headed by the company's top producers. Nagoshi became president of the studio Amusement Vision, and he was not sure on how to approach his new role at first. He thought that consistently making profit would be for the best. Nagoshi became interested in console development as a result of Sega leaving the hardware business. Specifically, he was interested in developing for Nintendo and acquired information about the GameCube at an early stage. The CEO of Sega at the time complained that games became too expensive to make, and Nagoshi told him that they couldn't do it any cheaper. As a type of protest, he developed a very simple and inexpensive game that just needed a lever to control with no buttons, just to prove that it was possible. That game was Super Monkey Ball, which initially launched as just Monkey Ball in the arcades. It didn't sell well in Japan, but became a hit overseas. The CEO was impressed, assuming that Nagoshi had the western market in mind, which Nagoshi didn't at all.

As a game developer, Nagoshi wanted to know how Nintendo worked, and wanted to be a sub-contractor for them. After some thought in regards to which Nintendo franchise he wanted to work on, Nagoshi ended up developing an entry for the F-Zero franchise, which was F-Zero GX. While Nagoshi could not convince Nintendo on several things, Nintendo was considerably impressed by the final product and asked for the source code of the game, as the game achieved a much higher quality than they anticipated. The game also sold really well, which gave the team confidence in being a third party developer. When asked about the differences in how Nintendo and Sega developed games, he would sum it up with Sega being more flashy and having a more light-hearted attitude when it comes to new ideas. Nagoshi says that if he started working at Nintendo instead of Sega, he would have already quit the videogame industry. Nagoshi's approach of managing Amusement Vision worked, as he was promoted to an executive role alongside Yuji Naka and Hisao Oguchi, who also ran profitable studios in the form of Naka's Sonic Team and Oguchi's Hitmaker.

=== Development of Yakuza and company promotions ===
Nagoshi decided not to compete with big western companies, including EA, Activision, and Rockstar. He decided to double down on the Japanese market instead. With the game Ryu Ga Gotoku, which then was localized as Yakuza in western markets, the only market left was the Japanese adult male. After a reorganization, Nagoshi's team became bigger after the non-sports staff of Smilebit moved to Amusement Vision, thereby falling under Nagoshi's responsibility. Amusement Vision and Smilebit had different cultures and strengths, so Nagoshi thought it'd be best for the staff morale to start from scratch and to develop a new IP in the form of Yakuza. By 2005, Amusement Vision was called New Entertainment R&D, which Nagoshi managed. The game had a difficult development cycle, as the first pitch was rejected by the higher-ups, due to expecting something different out of Nagoshi. At the time, Sega and Sammy merged to form Sega Sammy Holdings. The new owner and CEO of Sega Sammy, Hajime Satomi saw footage of Yakuza that was forcibly sneaked in a preview of upcoming Sega games, despite that it wasn't officially a project yet. Despite Sega executives viewing the game as an unprofitable risk due to its lack of broader appeal, Satomi took an interest in it. Through perseverance and Satomi's backing, Nagoshi managed to get the project started. It was his most personal project, as the people in the game are often named after people that Nagoshi knew personally. The main character Kazuma Kiryu is named after someone very dear to him. The stories are also based on his real life experiences in dating, partying and overall just having fun. When developing the Yakuza franchise, Nagoshi learned the difference between nurturing one IP and making many types of genres during his time at Sega AM2 and Amusement Vision. He thought it was very valuable to see both sides.

As of 2009, Nagoshi supervised all research and development of console game development at Sega of Japan. In 2010, Nagoshi's project Binary Domain was revealed, which was his desire to tell a science fiction story, while also developing a game that actively competed against popular western games at the time.

In February 2012 it was announced that Nagoshi would be promoted to the role of chief creative officer at Sega of Japan, as well as being appointed to the company's board of directors. He took up these positions on April 1, 2012. In October 2013, once Sega Sammy purchased the bankrupt Index Corporation under the shell corporation, Sega Dream Corporation, Nagoshi was appointed as a member of the board of directors for the reformed Atlus. As CCO, Nagoshi keeps being close to the games that his studio at Sega develops and stays up to date on the newest systems and technologies, although that is getting harder for him as he gets older. For the scripts of the Yakuza games, he still stays very involved, writing and adjusting whenever he feels like it.

In 2014, Nagoshi was involved in the multimedia kids franchise, Hero Bank, a superhero game that has money as a very important theme despite being aimed at kids.

With the 2016 game Yakuza 6: The Song of Life the story of Kazuma Kiryu ended. Nagoshi wants to continue to explore different types of drama and expand the overall playerbase further.

In January 2021, it was announced by Sega that Nagoshi would not be chief creative officer anymore but instead would take creative director as a position.

=== Departure from Sega ===
In October 2021, it was announced that Nagoshi would be leaving both Sega and Ryu Ga Gotoku Studio along with series director Daisuke Sato. The series producer and writer Masayoshi Yokoyama would become the new studio head in place of Nagoshi who was in the position since the beginning.

Nagoshi, Daisuke Sato, and several former Sega employees would soon establish Nagoshi Studio, a subsidiary of NetEase. The studio's first video game, Gang of Dragon, was shown at The Game Awards 2025. In March 2026, it was reported that NetEase would stop funding the game's development. In May 2026, the website of Nagoshi Studio and YouTube channel were removed, and multiple events cast Gang of Dragon's future in doubt. The studio officially shut down on October 31, 2026.

== Personal life ==
Nagoshi grew up in a small port town of Shimonoseki, Yamaguchi. He had a close relationship with his grandmother more than anyone else. His father was known to be in perpetual debt, something for which Nagoshi was frequently ostracized by other children. As an adult, he elected to leave his hometown for Tokyo and enroll into Tokyo Zokei University. Nagoshi has said that his interest in video games and game development was sparked when his girlfriend at the time gave him a Famicom with a copy of Super Mario Bros.. After gradually working his way up at Sega, he decided to return to his hometown in an effort to repay all of his father's numerous debts. In a tragic turn of events, a fire burned down his childhood home and claimed the life of his grandmother. His parents were physically unscathed, though his mother was left mentally scarred to such an extreme extent that she allegedly could not even recognize her own family. As a result of this, Nagoshi's relationship with his father deepened. Nagoshi has said that these events served as the primary source of inspiration for Yakuza's narrative.

Asked about his personal appearance, fashion style and how it changed over time, Nagoshi says he adapts to what his current girlfriend is into.

== Ludography ==
List of video game credits
| Year | Game | Role(s) | Ref. |
|---|---|---|---|
| 1990 | G-LOC: Air Battle | Graphic artist | |
| 1991 | Rent a Hero | Graphic artist | |
| 1992 | Virtua Racing | Chief artist | |
| 1993 | Virtua Fighter | CG artist | |
| 1994 | Daytona USA | Director, producer, chief artist | |
| 1994 | Virtua Fighter 2 | Stage artist | |
| 1996 | Virtua Fighter 3 | Character modeling direction, supervisor | |
| 1996 | Scud Race | Director, producer | |
| 1998 | Daytona USA 2 | Producer | |
| 1998 | SpikeOut | Director, producer, chief artist | |
| 1999 | Shenmue | Supervisor | |
| 2000 | Slashout | Producer | |
| 2000 | Planet Harriers | Director, producer | |
| 2001 | Daytona USA 2001 | Director, producer, art director | |
| 2001 | Spikers Battle | Producer | |
| 2001 | Monkey Ball | Director, producer | |
| 2001 | Super Monkey Ball | Director, producer | |
| 2002 | Super Monkey Ball 2 | Director, producer | |
| 2003 | F-Zero GX | Producer | |
| 2003 | Sonic Battle | Executive management | |
| 2003 | Billy Hatcher and the Giant Egg | Executive management | |
| 2004 | Shining Force: Resurrection of the Dark Dragon | Executive producer | |
| 2005 | Spikeout: Battle Street | Producer | |
| 2005 | Super Monkey Ball: Touch & Roll | Director, producer | |
| 2005 | Yakuza | Producer, general supervisor | |
| 2006 | Super Monkey Ball: Banana Blitz | Director, producer | |
| 2006 | Yakuza 2 | General director, original concept | |
| 2006 | Sonic Riders | Development support | |
| 2007 | Nights: Journey of Dreams | Chief producer | |
| 2008 | Ryu ga Gotoku Kenzan! | General director, original concept | |
| 2008 | Sonic Unleashed | Chief producer | |
| 2008 | Valkyria Chronicles | Chief producer | |
| 2008 | Thunder Force VI | Chief producer | |
| 2008 | Phantasy Star Portable | Chief producer | |
| 2008 | Phantasy Star 0 | Chief producer | |
| 2008 | The House of the Dead 2 & 3 Return | Chief producer | |
| 2009 | Wacky World of Sports | Chief producer | |
| 2009 | Sonic and the Black Knight | Chief producer | |
| 2009 | Puyo Puyo 7 | Chief producer | |
| 2009 | Phantasy Star Portable 2 | Chief producer | |
| 2009 | Mario & Sonic at the Olympic Winter Games | Chief producer | |
| 2009 | 7th Dragon | Chief producer | |
| 2009 | Bayonetta | Chief producer | |
| 2009 | Yakuza 3 | General Director, original concept | |
| 2010 | Kurohyō: Ryū ga Gotoku Shinshō | General director, story | |
| 2010 | Yakuza 4 | General director, original concept | |
| 2010 | Valkyria Chronicles II | Chief producer | |
| 2010 | Vanquish | Chief producer | |
| 2010 | Super Monkey Ball: Step & Roll | Chief producer | |
| 2010 | Sonic the Hedgehog 4: Episode I | Chief producer | |
| 2010 | Resonance of Fate | Chief producer | |
| 2010 | Sonic Colors | Chief producer | |
| 2010 | Sonic Free Riders | Chief producer | |
| 2011 | Yakuza: Dead Souls | General director | |
| 2011 | Super Monkey Ball 3D | Chief producer | |
| 2011 | Sonic Generations | Chief producer | |
| 2011 | Puyo Puyo!! 20th Anniversary | Chief producer | |
| 2011 | Rise of Nightmares | Chief producer | |
| 2011 | Mario & Sonic at the London 2012 Olympic Games | Executive supervisor | |
| 2012 | Binary Domain | General director | |
| 2012 | Yakuza 5 | General director | |
| 2012 | The House of the Dead 4 | Chief producer | |
| 2012 | Hell Yeah! Wrath of the Dead Rabbit | Executive producer | |
| 2012 | Phantasy Star Online 2 | Executive supervisor | |
| 2012 | Sonic the Hedgehog 4: Episode II | Chief producer | |
| 2012 | Rhythm Thief & the Emperor's Treasure | Chief producer | |
| 2012 | Hatsune Miku: Project DIVA F | Executive producer | |
| 2013 | Mario & Sonic at the Sochi 2014 Olympic Winter Games | Executive supervisor | |
| 2013 | Sonic Lost World | Chief producer | |
| 2014 | Hero Bank | Chief producer | |
| 2014 | Ryu ga Gotoku: Ishin! | General director | |
| 2014 | Puyo Puyo Tetris | Chief producer | |
| 2014 | Hatsune Miku: Project DIVA F 2nd | Executive producer | |
| 2014 | Dengeki Bunko: Fighting Climax | Executive producer | |
| 2015 | Yakuza 0 | Executive director | |
| 2015 | Tembo the Badass Elephant | Executive producer | |
| 2015 | Hatsune Miku: Project Mirai DX | Executive supervisor | |
| 2016 | Puyo Puyo Chronicle | Chief producer | |
| 2016 | Sonic Boom: Fire & Ice | Chief producer | |
| 2016 | Yakuza Kiwami | Executive director | |
| 2016 | Yakuza 6: The Song of Life | Executive director | |
| 2016 | Mario & Sonic at the Rio 2016 Olympic Games | Executive supervisor | |
| 2017 | Yakuza Kiwami 2 | Executive director | |
| 2017 | Hatsune Miku: Project DIVA Future Tone | Executive producer | |
| 2017 | Valkyria Revolution | Executive producer | |
| 2017 | Sonic Mania | Executive producer | |
| 2017 | Sonic Forces | Executive producer | |
| 2018 | Fist of the North Star: Lost Paradise | Executive director | |
| 2018 | Puyo Puyo Champions | Executive producer | |
| 2018 | Shining Resonance Refrain | Executive producer | |
| 2018 | Valkyria Chronicles 4 | Executive producer | |
| 2018 | Judgment | Executive director, story | |
| 2019 | Mario & Sonic at the Olympic Games Tokyo 2020 | Executive producer | |
| 2019 | Team Sonic Racing | Executive producer | |
| 2019 | Super Monkey Ball: Banana Blitz HD | Executive management | |
| 2019 | Sakura Wars | Executive producer | |
| 2020 | Yakuza: Like a Dragon | Executive director | |
| 2020 | Puyo Puyo Tetris 2 | Executive producer | |
| 2021 | Virtua Fighter 5: Ultimate Showdown | Creative director | |
| 2021 | Lost Judgment | Executive director, story | |
| 2021 | Super Monkey Ball Banana Mania | Executive management | |
