= SMB2 =

SMB2 may refer to:

- SMB 2.0 (also SMB2), a new version of the Server Message Block communication protocol included with Windows Vista
- Super Mystère B.2 (also SMB.2), a variant of the Dassault Super Mystère French fighter-bomber
- Super Mario Bros. 2, a 1988 Nintendo video game from the Super Mario franchise
  - Super Mario Bros.: The Lost Levels, the name given outside Japan to the initial 1986 Japanese exclusive version of Super Mario Bros. 2
- Super Monkey Ball 2, a Sega video game, which is also a sequel to Super Monkey Ball
