= Monkey ball =

Monkey ball or Monkey Ball may refer to:

== Plants ==
- Maclura pomifera, the Osage orange tree
- Liquidambar styraciflua, sweet gum tree fruit

== Other uses ==
- Super Monkey Ball, a platform video game series
  - Super Monkey Ball (video game), the first game in the series, originally an upright arcade cabinet called Monkey Ball
