= Super Monkey Ball Banana Rumble =

2024 video game

- North American box art
- Developer: Ryu Ga Gotoku Studio
- Publisher: Sega
- Director: Daisuke Takahata
- Producer: Nobuhiro Suzuki
- Designer: Tomoki Hatanaka
- Programmer: Yōichi Ishikawa
- Artist: Michio Abe
- Composer: Yuri Fukuda
- Series: Super Monkey Ball
- Engine: Unity
- Platform: Nintendo Switch
- Release: June 25, 2024
- Genres: Platform, party
- Modes: Single-player, multiplayer

Super Monkey Ball Banana Rumble (Note: Known in Japan as Sūpā Monkī Bōru Banana Ranburu (Japanese: スーパーモンキーボール バナナランブル)) is a 2024 platformer video game developed by Ryu Ga Gotoku Studio and published by Sega. It was released on June 25, 2024, for the Nintendo Switch and received generally favorable reviews from professional critics.

== Gameplay ==
Similar to previous games, Banana Rumble consists of controlling one of several playable characters on hazardous stages via tilting the stage, to reach the goal within the time limit without falling off the stage.

A new move, the Spin Dash, allows the player to gain a burst of speed to perform shortcuts, but the move has a cooldown upon use. Multiplayer is supported locally and online with four players, a feature returning from Super Monkey Ball, and in a battle mode where 16 players engage into minigames, both locally and online.

== Features ==
The game features 200 new stages, 18 characters, 11 of which are new characters, and 6 of which are paid DLC, and a multiplayer battle mode which features an assortment of items. Characters can also be customized, with accessories which can be unlocked through gameplay and paid DLC. The villain of the second console game, Dr. Bad-Boon, also makes an appearance as a playable character.

== Development ==
The game and its release date was announced during a Nintendo Direct Partner Showcase on February 21, 2024. Yukio Oda—a long-time level designer for the franchise—stated that the new Spin Dash move was meant to help "broaden" the possibilities for players, and explained that “even after looking back over 20 years, there are many levels that I think are very original. I think that the originality of the first Super Monkey Ball is the DNA of the series, so I made Banana Rumble keeping all of this in mind while also trying to adapt it to the changing times and the needs of the players."

Sega has continued to provide post-launch support for the game. The Sega Pass, which was available at launch and included with Digital Deluxe editions, contained six playable characters (the classic versions of Sonic the Hedgehog, Tails, Knuckles the Echidna, and Amy Rose from the Sonic the Hedgehog franchise, Beat from the Jet Set Radio series, and Axel from the Crazy Taxi series) that released throughout the year. On September 17, 2024, Version 1.2.0 released, which contained a new Battle Mode, Gem Heist. It also saw a collaboration with Dole, the first such collaboration in the series since Super Monkey Ball 2, which released over 20 years prior. On November 26 the same year, Version 2.0 released, featuring new rules and stages for Adventure Mode (including a first-person mode), new Battle Modes, quality of life improvements, as well as adding Godzilla and Hatsune Miku as playable DLC characters. A Crewmate from Among Us, Pac-Man, and Red from Angry Birds were later added in separate respective updates between January and April 2025. Godzilla and Hatsune Miku were delisted and became unavailable for purchase on November 26, 2025, and Pac-Man was delisted on March 26, 2026. Red from Angry Birds was delisted on April 8, 2026.

== Critical reception ==
Reception

Aggregate scores
Aggregator	Score
Metacritic	77/100 (Note: Based on 54 reviews, 38 (70%) of which were positive, 14 (26%) were "mixed", and 2 were unscored)
OpenCritic	70% recommend

Review scores
Publication	Score
Digital Trends	4/5
Famitsu	30/40
Game Informer	8/10
IGN	8/10
Nintendo Life	7/10
Nintendo World Report	8.5/10
Shacknews	8/10

According to review aggregator website Metacritic, Super Monkey Ball Banana Rumble received "generally favorable" reviews. Fellow review aggregator OpenCritic assessed that the game received strong approval, being recommended by 70% of critics. In Japan, four critics from Famitsu gave the game a total score of 30 out of 40.
