= RGG Studio =

Japanese video game developer

Sega Consumer Research and Development Dept. #1
- Trade name: RGG Studio
- Native name: RGGスタジオ
- Romanized name: Āru Ji Ji Sutajio
- Type: Division
- Industry: Video games
- Predecessor: Sega AM11 (1998–1999); Sega R&D4 (1999–2000); Amusement Vision, Ltd. (2000–2005); New Entertainment R&D Dept. (2005–2009)
- Founded: August 31, 2011; 15 years ago
- Founder: Toshihiro Nagoshi
- Headquarters: Shinagawa, Tokyo, Japan
- Key people: Masayoshi Yokoyama (studio head); Ryosuke Horii; Yutaka Ito; Hiroyuki Sakamoto
- Products: Like a Dragon series (2012–present); Binary Domain; Judgment series; Super Monkey Ball series (2019–present); Virtua Fighter series (2021–present)
- Number of employees: 300+ (2021)
- Parent: Sega
- Website: http://ryu-ga-gotoku.com/

Sega CS R&D Dept. No. 1, (Note: Japanese: セガ 第一CS研究開発部, Hepburn: Sega daiichi shīesu kenkyū kaihatsubu) doing business as RGG Studio (Note: Japanese: RGGスタジオ, Hepburn: Āru Ji Ji Sutajio) (formerly known as Ryu Ga Gotoku Studio (Note: Japanese: 龍が如くスタジオ, Hepburn: Ryū ga Gotoku Sutajio)), is a Japanese video game developer and a division of Sega. It is known for developing the games in the Like a Dragon series, which the studio is named after since Yakuza 5, and the Super Monkey Ball series.

The studio's origins can be traced back to Sega AM11 in 1998, which was renamed to R&D4 or AM4 in 1999. It was headed by Toshihiro Nagoshi, who joined Sega AM2 in 1989 and has been credited as the creator of the arcade games Daytona USA and Virtua Striker. Although Virtua Striker is attributed to another developer, Satoshi Mifune. Nagoshi requested his own development division during the development of Shenmue.

In 2000, AM4 was re-established as Amusement Vision, (Note: Japanese: アミューズメントヴィジョン, Hepburn: Amyūzumentovu~ijon) where it was best known for Super Monkey Ball and F-Zero GX. Several structural changes occurred in the years that followed. During a reorganization in 2003, the non-sports staff of Smilebit merged with Amusement Vision, and a year later Sega merged with Sammy to form Sega Sammy Holdings. Amusement Vision became New Entertainment R&D Dept. and the first Like a Dragon game was released. Ryū ga Gotoku Kenzan! was the last Like a Dragon game to be developed under the New Entertainment R&D name.

Since Yakuza 3, they were referred to as Sega's CS1 team, all the way up to Yakuza: Dead Souls. The first game to use the RGG logo was Binary Domain in Japan, released in February 2012. Eventually, the RGG Studio's logo became used consistently and the way they brand themselves and give themselves an identity of their own. The current iteration of the logo was introduced during the announcement of the western release of Yakuza Kiwami 2 in 2018. The studio's logo and name have become recognizable internationally for Sega as a whole, although studio leader Masayoshi Yokoyama stresses that it is not a separate company organization but a nickname for a development team within Sega.

== History ==
=== Amusement Vision ===
Amusement Vision logo

Toshihiro Nagoshi joined Sega in 1989 as a designer. As Sega began developing 3D games such as Virtua Racing, he was able to apply his knowledge of film in choosing the right camera angles in three dimensional spaces, something that the other team members had no experience with. Nagoshi became producer, director and chief designer of Daytona USA, which became one of the most successful arcade games of all time. Next he worked on another racing game, Scud Race, which, while successful, did not make as much money as Daytona USA. Nagoshi felt pressure to constantly deliver racing games as he became known for the genre in the company. He developed SpikeOut, which he described as a "personal rebellion" as it was a character based action game where players could play for a long time with just one credit, though profits for arcade operators suffered. Nagoshi requested his own development division during the development of Shenmue.

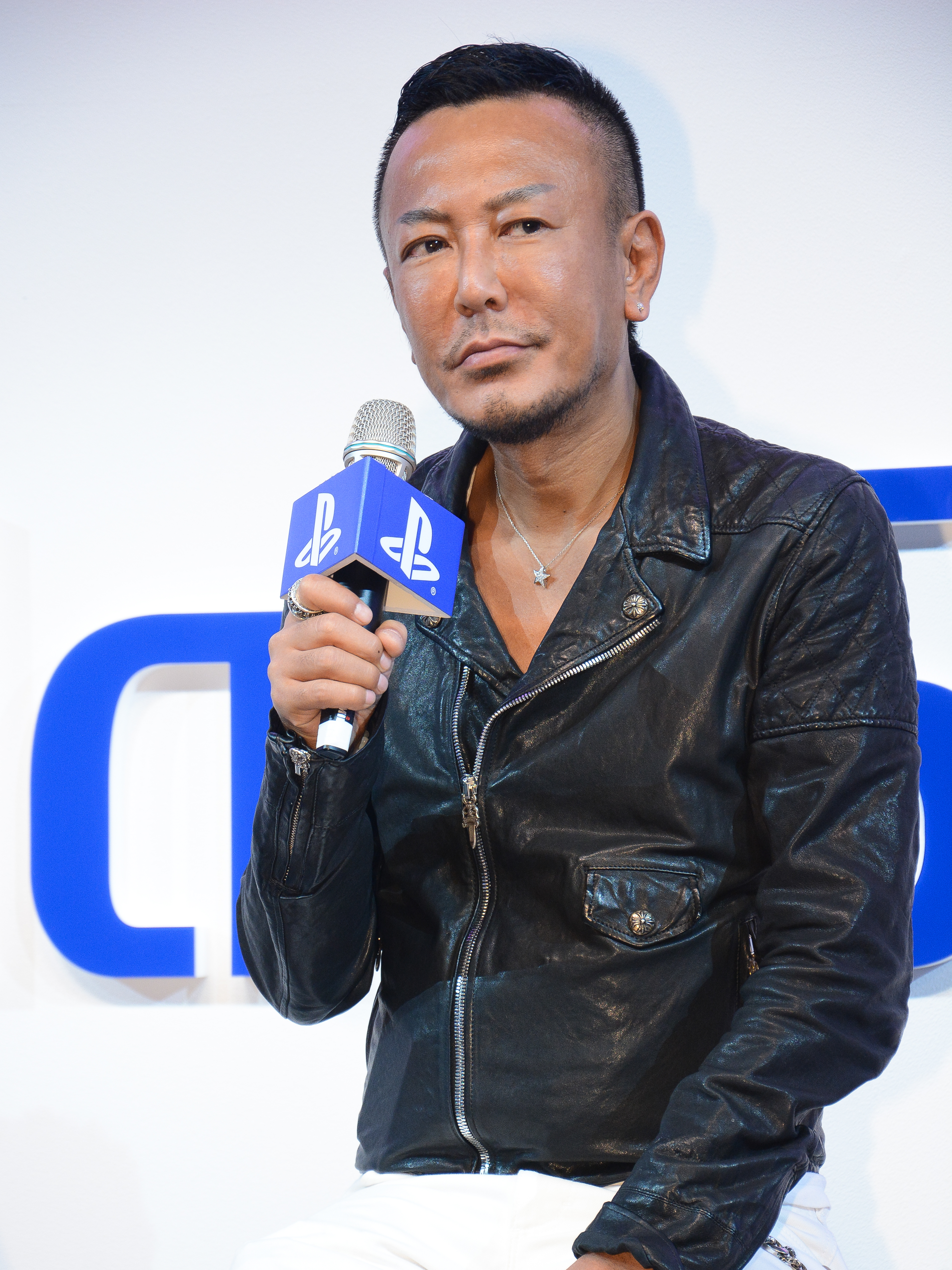
Toshihiro Nagoshi

In what has been called "a brief moment of remarkable creativity", in 2000, Sega restructured its arcade and console development teams into nine semi-autonomous studios headed by the company's top creators. In 2000, Toshihiro Nagoshi was the president of AV (Amusement Vision). Nagoshi chose the name because he was fond of the term "vision", and amusement was the core market of the studio. AV refers to Adult Video in Japan, however Nagoshi thinks with all adult videos being streamed in the future, people will instead think of amusement video when they see AV. Speaking about initial plans for AV, Nagoshi wanted to make original games in addition to sequels. He also was not fond of doing ports of arcade games, believing console and arcade games should be developed separately and in mind for their target market. Of the nine studios that Sega established, AV was the smallest, with about 50 employees.

Nagoshi devised the concept of rolling spheres through mazes based on his desire to create a game that was instantly possible to understand and play, as a contrast to increasingly complex games at Japanese arcades at the time. Another desire for developing the game was to prove that games can be successful without a huge budget, which was a particular complaint from Sega's CEO at the time.

AV developed it initially as an arcade game, Monkey Ball. Monkey Ball was first released in Japanese arcades in June 2001, and then received an upgraded version — Super Monkey Ball — as a GameCube launch game in all regions. After the success of the first Super Monkey Ball, it spawned a direct sequel on the GameCube. Following that, a collaboration with Nintendo happened. AV would develop F-Zero GX in a contracted development, while Nintendo would be responsible for the supervision, production and publishing of their IP. In the end, Nintendo was impressed with the product, considering it a step forward for the F-Zero franchise.

Amusement Vision consistently produced high selling games and was profitable every year. Nagoshi was promoted within Sega along with Yuji Naka and Hisao Oguchi who also ran profitable studios in the form of Naka's Sonic Team and Oguchi's Hitmaker. When Oguchi became company president in 2003, he announced his intention to consolidate Sega's studios into "four or five core operations". As part of the consolidation, the non-sports staff of Smilebit, developers of games like Jet Set Radio Future and Panzer Dragoon Orta on Xbox, were absorbed by Amusement Vision. Smilebit was considered to be less commercially successful than AV and also focused more on the console market, but had high technical skills. Nagoshi had to think about how to use everyone's skill to the best of their ability. When the idea of a game portraying the Japanese underworld came about from Nagoshi, Masayoshi Kikuchi who previously worked on the Jet Set Radio series at Smilebit, agreed to the concept. Coincidentally he was watching yakuza type movies and also had a desire to turn that type of atmosphere into a game. By 2004, AV had about 124 employees.

During 2004, Sammy Corporation bought a controlling share in Sega and created the new company Sega Sammy Holdings, an entertainment conglomerate. Since then, Sega and Sammy became subsidiaries of the aforementioned holding company, with both companies operating independently, while the executive departments merged. Prior to the acquisition by Sammy, Sega began the process of re-integrating its subsidiaries into the main company, which was completed by October 2004. Sega would also restructure the development studios again, consolidating the divisions further into the Global Entertainment, Amusement Software, and New Entertainment R&D divisions.

=== Development of Yakuza / Like a Dragon and building a franchise ===
By 2005, most Amusement Vision members were located at the New Entertainment R&D Dept. The first Like a Dragon game had a difficult development cycle, as the first pitch was rejected by the higher-ups, due to expecting something different out of Nagoshi. The CEO of Sega Sammy, Hajime Satomi saw footage of Like a Dragon that was forcibly sneaked in a preview of upcoming Sega games, in spite of that it wasn't officially a project yet. Satomi took an interest in it, though the Sega executives were unhappy about this move. Through perseverance however, Nagoshi managed to get the project started.

The project was risky as there was no estimate on how the market would accept a game aimed at only adult Japanese males, based in the Japanese underworld. The highest estimate was only 70,000 copies in Japan. However, over time, the game sold over 1 million copies. Nagoshi said that it gave the team confidence to press on and continue to evolve it into a series. The staff from Amusement Vision and Smilebit worked on many different console and arcade games, and they had confidence in their genres and careers. However, Like a Dragon did not match any of their past experiences, which Nagoshi saw as them all playing on a level playing field. Every element of the game had to go through Nagoshi first, because only he had a concrete idea of how the game was supposed to end up. However, some staff did not like the uncertain nature and overall pressure of the project, and ended up quitting. When the game grew into a franchise, the staff gained more freedom and independence in regards to which elements to put into the game, due to established rules by Nagoshi. Therefore, the games became more varied as the series went on. The initial target audience was adult Japanese males but over time, the series audience expanded into females and also overseas players, though the primary target audience still remains the adult Japanese males.

Nagoshi says that the development team of the Like a Dragon series always needs to have a sense of challenge. For Yakuza 2, they first thought about having a two-year development cycle, but after discussion, it was thought that releasing and developing the game just one year later would be better to keep audiences attention, though it meant more work for them. For the first spin-off Ryū ga Gotoku Kenzan!, the team initially made fun of their goal of making the game for the new PlayStation 3 while also moving to a different setting. However, they managed to make it in just a year and a bit, and the staff felt refreshed. The team held seminars in Japan explaining how to develop an HD game in 10 months.

While certain things have become routine, each game is still hard work for the team, but the fanbase keeps Nagoshi motivated. Nagoshi explains that the fast release schedule of one game per year with a massive amount of content is based on the team's desire to constantly keep delivering the fans with not just what they want, but also to surprise them.

The release of Yakuza 0 led to an increase in international recognition of the series. While previous localized installments did not always meet sales expectations, Yakuza 0, being a prequel, made it an easy jumping-in point for new fans as well as the localization expertise of recently merged Atlus USA, were factors in its success. This also led to the previous games getting remasters and remakes in the form of the two remakes Yakuza Kiwami and Yakuza Kiwami 2 and remasters of Yakuza 3, Yakuza 4 and Yakuza 5. Producer Daisuke Sato wanted to continue to create games that were well accepted globally, not only limited to Japan and niche consumers.

In October 2021, Sega announced that Nagoshi and Daisuke Sato were leaving the company after decades working in it. Due to this, series producer and writer Masayoshi Yokoyama would become the new studio head in place of Nagoshi who was in the position since the beginning. With the shift in leadership, the studio confirmed they were working on a sequel to Yakuza: Like a Dragon.

During a 2025 seminar, lead programmer Yutaka Ito explained that RGG Studio considered splitting its team into two, or using outsourcing for the development of their remakes and remasters. However, this has not worked out due to quality issues. Instead a call was made that programmers work on multiple titles in parallel.

=== Writing ===
The main writer behind the stories and scenarios of most of the Like a Dragon series has been Masayoshi Yokoyama, who previously was a senior planner for Jet Set Radio and director of Ollie King. When developing the first game, the tagline was "The maddog Yakuza and the 10 billion yen girl" and various members of the team were able to pitch a story. Yokoyama's proposal stood out where instead of focusing on a big plot twist that concerned the girl and the 10 billion yen, he drew up a character correlation chart, and explained how the various characters were related to each other. As a whole, Yokoyama focuses on entertaining characters and scenes, and only decides the culprit at the very end in the writing process, with a focus on who would be the most interesting to fight as a final boss. Yokoyama himself doesn't read novels and has no training in script writing, and is mostly inspired by visual mediums like film and TV shows. For the first two Like a Dragon games, crime novelist Hase Seishu was an editor of Yokoyama's scripts. He heavily critiqued the first draft, suggesting that it lacks realism, so Yokoyama did further research and adjusted the script in his own way. For the second game, Yokoyama only needed one round of editing from Seishu. Nagoshi is very involved in the creation of the scripts, and advocated for the various elements found in Yakuza 3, such as the more heartwarming atmosphere with the kids at the orphanage, the return of Joji Kazama, as well as suggesting the keywords "base" and "defense" for the story. For Yakuza 2, the golden Osaka Castle, was also Nagoshi's idea. For Yakuza: Like a Dragon, Nagoshi wanted to write all the lines for Saeko. As far as endings are concerned, Nagoshi insisted that they should be uplifting which is similar to Hollywood productions, while the rest adheres to different rules than western cinema.

A different writer includes Tsuyoshi Furuta, who wrote the scripts of Judgment and Lost Judgment. Before those games, Furuta was one of the writers of the well received Yakuza 0 and he was thought of Nagoshi to be the best choice to make a script that differentiates from the Like a Dragon series. Furuta did not start his game development career at Sega, but at Spike Chunsoft and worked on 428: Shibuya Scramble.

=== Other projects ===
One detour for the team was the game Binary Domain, which unlike the Like a Dragon series, was an attempt to make something for the worldwide audience. However, it was a commercial failure, only selling 20,000 copies in North America by April 2012. It made the team reflect on preferring to keep making authentic Japanese games rather than pretending to be something else.

Virtua Fighter 5: Ultimate Showdown, was co-developed with Sega AM2. A new Virtua Fighter, called Virtua Fighter: Crossroads, developed by RGG Studio is confirmed to be in development. As of 2024, AM2 is under the jurisdriction of RGG Studio and Masayoshi Yokoyama.

Nagoshi said that for the Super Monkey Ball series, he put the wheels in motion at the very beginning, but eventually, other staff continued where he left off when subsequent games got made. Jun Tokuhara who joined 1999 as a programmer, directed series entries Super Monkey Ball Step & Roll, Super Monkey Ball 3D and Super Monkey Ball: Banana Splitz. Between those, he worked on minigames of Ryu Ga Gotoku: Kenzan and Yakuza 3. Talks of bringing back the Super Monkey Ball IP with remasters were happening as the IP has remained important to the studio, but nothing came into fruition, due to struggling to get the right team of people. Masao Shirosaki was pondering what to work on next after finishing development as chief planner on Judgment, and as Shirosaki and some staff became available, the project officially began. Shirosaki revealed that Banana Blitz specifically was chosen for a remaster, because with the limited time and budget they had, it was the most reasonable choice. However, he stated that if successful, remakes of 1 and 2, as well as a new game would be possible. While there was initially no official word from Sega on how Banana Blitz HD performed, a remake of the first 3 Super Monkey Ball games, Super Monkey Ball Banana Mania that takes the series back to its origins, had ultimately come into fruition. Shirosaki later revealed in a September 2021 interview that Banana Blitz HD did actually receive a lot of support from the fans. The RGG Studio branding is not used consistently across regions and releases.

CS1 moved on to mobile games with Ryu Ga Gotoku Mobile released for GREE and Kingdom Conquest for iOS. The team that handled these mobile games formed a new team and left CS1 to establish a new division exclusively dedicated to these mobile games, due to the growth of mobile games and the release of internet enabled PlayStation Vita. It is headed by Like a Dragon producer Masayoshi Kikuchi, thus effectively leaving the studio with his last credit being Yakuza 5. For a time, the sports management simulator games that Sega develops, called the Saka Tsuku series, were made in the same CS1 department.

== Technology ==
In terms of technology, several Sega games influenced the first Like a Dragon game on PlayStation 2. One was the rendering techniques from Jet Set Radio to mask the relatively low polygon count, the other was the combat of Spikeout. At first the combat and exploration parts were very separated due to the nature of how parts of the team had different strengths and was less united. Informed by the techniques learned by making Binary Domain, the Dragon Engine developed for Yakuza 6: The Song of Life seamlessly integrated exploring, combat and story sequences. The Dragon Engine was also lent to Virtua Fighter 5: Ultimate Showdown. The studio also uses off the shelf engines Unreal and Unity depending on the project. The Super Monkey Ball series uses Unity since the remake of Super Monkey Ball Banana Blitz, while Like a Dragon: Ishin! uses the Unreal Engine. New employees to RGG Studio learn all three engines, Unity, Unreal and the in-house Dragon Engine.

== Games developed ==
=== As AM11 ===
Year	Game	Platforms	Ref.
1998	SpikeOut	Arcade	
1999	Virtua NBA	Arcade	

=== As Amusement Vision ===
Year	Game	Platforms	Ref.
2000	Slashout	Arcade	
2000	Planet Harriers	Arcade	
2000	Daytona USA 2001 (Note: Co-developed with Genki)	Dreamcast	
2001	Super Monkey Ball	Arcade, GameCube	
2001	Spikers Battle	Arcade	
2001	Virtua Striker 3	Arcade, GameCube	
2002	Super Monkey Ball 2	GameCube	
2003	F-Zero GX	GameCube	
2003	F-Zero AX	Arcade	
2004	Ollie King	Arcade	
2004	Shining Force: Resurrection of the Dark Dragon (Note: Co-developed with Climax Entertainment)	Game Boy Advance	

=== As New Entertainment ===
Year	Game	Platforms	Ref.
2005	Super Monkey Ball Deluxe	PlayStation 2, Xbox	
2005	Super Monkey Ball: Touch & Roll	Nintendo DS	
2005	Spikeout: Battle Street (Note: Co-developed with Dimps)	Xbox	
2005	Yakuza	PlayStation 2	
2006	Super Monkey Ball: Banana Blitz	Wii	
2006	Yakuza 2	PlayStation 2	
2008	Ryū ga Gotoku Kenzan!	PlayStation 3	

=== As CS1 R&D ===
Year	Game	Platforms	Ref.
2009	Yakuza 3	PlayStation 3	
2010	Super Monkey Ball: Step & Roll	Wii	
2010	Yakuza 4	PlayStation 3	
2010	Kurohyō: Ryū ga Gotoku Shinshō (Note: Co-developed with Syn Sophia)	PlayStation Portable	
2011	Super Monkey Ball 3D	Nintendo 3DS	
2011	Yakuza: Dead Souls	PlayStation 3	

=== As Ryu Ga Gotoku Studio ===
Year	Game	Platforms	Ref.
2012	Binary Domain	PlayStation 3, Windows, Xbox 360	
2012	Kurohyō 2: Ryū ga Gotoku Ashura hen (Note: Co-developed with Syn Sophia)	PlayStation Portable	
2012	Ryū ga Gotoku 1&2 HD	PlayStation 3, Wii U	
2012	Yakuza 5	PlayStation 3	
2014	Ryū ga Gotoku Ishin!	PlayStation 3, PlayStation 4	
2015	Yakuza 0	PlayStation 3, PlayStation 4, Windows, Xbox One, Amazon Luna	
2016	Yakuza Kiwami	PlayStation 3, PlayStation 4, Windows, Xbox One, Nintendo Switch, Nintendo Switch 2	
2016	Yakuza 6: The Song of Life	PlayStation 4, Windows, Xbox One	
2017	Yakuza Kiwami 2	PlayStation 4, Windows, Xbox One, Nintendo Switch 2	
2018	Fist of the North Star: Lost Paradise	PlayStation 4	
2018	Yakuza 3 Remastered	PlayStation 4, Windows, Xbox One	
2018	Ryū ga Gotoku Online (Note: Co-developed with Sega Division 3)	Android, iOS, Windows	
2018	Judgment	PlayStation 4	
2019	Yakuza 4 Remastered	PlayStation 4, Windows, Xbox One	
2019	Yakuza 5 Remastered	PlayStation 4, Windows, Xbox One	
2019	Super Monkey Ball: Banana Blitz HD	Nintendo Switch, PlayStation 4, Windows, Xbox One	
2020	Yakuza: Like a Dragon	PlayStation 4, PlayStation 5, Windows, Xbox One, Xbox Series X/S	
2021	Judgment Remastered	PlayStation 5, Stadia, Windows, Xbox Series X/S	
2021	Virtua Fighter 5: Ultimate Showdown (Note: Co-developed with Sega AM2) (Note: Dubbed as Virtua Fighter esports in Japanese version)	PlayStation 4, Arcade (Sega ALLS UX)	
2021	Lost Judgment	PlayStation 4, PlayStation 5, Windows, Xbox One, Xbox Series X/S	
2021	Super Monkey Ball Banana Mania	Nintendo Switch, PlayStation 4, PlayStation 5, Windows, Xbox One, Xbox Series X/S	
2023	Like a Dragon: Ishin!	PlayStation 4, PlayStation 5, Windows, Xbox One, Xbox Series X/S	
2023	Like a Dragon Gaiden: The Man Who Erased His Name	PlayStation 4, PlayStation 5, Windows, Xbox One, Xbox Series X/S	
2024	Like a Dragon: Infinite Wealth	PlayStation 4, PlayStation 5, Windows, Xbox One, Xbox Series X/S	
2024	Super Monkey Ball Banana Rumble	Nintendo Switch	
2025	Virtua Fighter 5 R.E.V.O. World Stage (Note: Originally released as Virtua Fighter 5 R.E.V.O.)	Nintendo Switch 2, Windows, PlayStation 5, Xbox Series X/S	
2025	Like a Dragon: Pirate Yakuza in Hawaii	PlayStation 4, PlayStation 5, Windows, Xbox One, Xbox Series X/S	
2025	Yakuza 0 Director's Cut	Nintendo Switch 2, Windows, PlayStation 5, Xbox Series X/S	
2026	Yakuza Kiwami 3 & Dark Ties	Nintendo Switch 2, PlayStation 4, PlayStation 5, Windows, Xbox Series X/S	

=== As RGG Studio ===
Year	Game	Platforms	Ref.
2027	Stranger Than Heaven	PlayStation 5, Windows, Xbox Series X/S	
2027	Virtua Fighter Crossroads	TBA	

== Marketing ==
The RGG Studio logo was established in late August 2011, and was first used to promote Binary Domain in Japan back in February 2012. RGG Studio strives to be consumer facing as fan communication is done in-house via social media and real life events, rather than simply using retailers and online game platforms, like a B2B business.

== Issues and controversies with real life actors ==
Prior to the release of Yakuza 4 Remastered in 2018 in Japan, Sega recast the voice actor and likeness of one of its playable characters. The character, voiced and based off the likeness of Hiroki Narimiya, was forced to be recast after the actor announced his retirement from the acting industry in 2016 over drug allegations

Sega released Judgment in Japan on December 13, 2018. Japanese sales of the game was temporarily halted on March 13, 2019, after Pierre Taki, a Japanese actor whose voice and likeness had been used for the character of Kyohei Hamura, was arrested for cocaine possession and use by officers of the Narcotics Control Department (NCD) of the Ministry of Health, Labour and Welfare. According to the NCD, Taki had been under investigation since 2018 following tips from unnamed sources and was asked to submit a urine sample. He was later found guilty and was sentenced to 18-months in prison, suspended for three years. Sega has since replaced Pierre with a new actor and face model and resumed sales of the game, with the Western release of the game using the new likeness

Yakuza Kiwami 3 & Dark Ties, a remake of Yakuza 3 that released on February 12, 2026, has received backlash from some of the western public after the release of a trailer for the game due to association with Japanese actor Teruyuki Kagawa, who was accused of sexual harassment towards two women in 2019, and confessed to kissing, groping and removing the bra of one of the women in 2022. Sega and RGG Studios have not addressed the backlash.

== See also ==
- Sega AM1
- Sega AM2
- Sega AM3
- Smilebit
- Sonic Team
- United Game Artists
