= Super Monkey Ball Banana Mania =

2021 video game

- Developer: Ryu Ga Gotoku Studio
- Publisher: Sega
- Director: Masao Shirosaki
- Producer: Masao Shirosaki
- Designers: Taisho Kin; Kagari Horiuchi
- Programmer: Yōichi Ishikawa
- Artist: Michio Abe
- Composers: Hidenori Shoji; Saori Yoshida; Satoshi Okamura
- Series: Super Monkey Ball
- Engine: Unity
- Platforms: Nintendo Switch; PlayStation 4; PlayStation 5; Windows; Xbox One; Xbox Series X/S
- Release: NS, PS4, PS5, Windows: WW: October 5, 2021; JP/AS: October 7, 2021; Xbox One, Xbox Series X/S: WW: October 5, 2021
- Genres: Platform, party
- Modes: Single-player, multiplayer

Super Monkey Ball Banana Mania (Note: Known in Japan as Tabegoro! Sūpā Monkī Bōru 1&2 Rimeiku (Japanese: たべごろ！スーパーモンキーボール 1＆2リメイク; lit. Good Enough to Eat! Super Monkey Ball 1&2 Remake)) is a platform party game developed by Ryu Ga Gotoku Studio and published by Sega. It is a remake of the first three console entries in the Super Monkey Ball series, and was released in celebration of the series' 20th anniversary for Nintendo Switch, PlayStation 4, PlayStation 5, Windows, Xbox One, and Xbox Series X/S on October 5, 2021. A version for Amazon Luna was released on May 12, 2022. It received favorable reviews from critics.

== Gameplay ==
As in previous Super Monkey Ball games, the objective of the primary game mode is to navigate a monkey in a ball across a series of suspended platforms to reach a goal and clear the stage. To do this, the player must tilt the stage to direct the ball's movement, utilizing the game's physics to clear obstacles and avoid falling off the edge. Banana Mania features recreations of all 300 stages from Super Monkey Ball Deluxe (2005), a compilation release of Super Monkey Ball (2001) and Super Monkey Ball 2 (2002). Certain stages have been rebalanced, decreasing their overall difficulty; the original versions of these stages can still be played in a new "Original Stage Mode". The Story mode from 2 also returns, now utilizing comic-book-style story sequences in place of the animated cutscenes from the original releases, along with all 12 multiplayer party games from DX.

A handful of new modes have been added to Banana Mania, each of which presents a selection of 10 stages from the main game that must be completed in alternate ways. These include "Golden Banana Mode", in which players must collect all the bananas in a stage; "Reverse Mode", in which a stage's starting and goal points are swapped; and "Dark Banana Mode", in which players must complete a stage without touching any rotten bananas. Other new features added to Banana Mania include a time attack mode, online leaderboards, and a photo mode. Several new optional accessibility features have been added as well, including the jumping mechanic from Super Monkey Ball: Banana Blitz, a "slow-motion" button, an extended time limit and an optimal path guide. Players can earn an in-game currency known as "Points" by completing stages and collecting bananas in the main game, or completing any of the 747 missions. These points can be spent at the in-game Points Shop to purchase new characters, modes, alternate costumes, accessories for character customization, and options for the photo mode.

AiAi, MeeMee, Baby and GonGon, the four playable characters from the original releases, all return for Banana Mania, alongside YanYan and Doctor from Banana Blitz; these six characters are playable in all modes and can be customized with unlockable accessories. Additional characters can be unlocked for use in the main game through the Points Shop; these include Jam from Super Monkey Ball: Step & Roll, Jet from Super Monkey Ball 3D, and several guest characters from other Sega games, including Sonic and Tails from Sonic the Hedgehog, Beat from Jet Set Radio, and Kazuma Kiryu from Yakuza. Three additional guest characters were also released as premium downloadable content: Morgana from Atlus' Persona 5; Sanrio's Hello Kitty; and Suezo from Koei Tecmo's Monster Rancher. These downloadable characters have since been delisted from digital storefronts.

== Development ==
Following the release of Super Monkey Ball: Banana Blitz HD and the support from the fans, the staff began talking about creating the next Super Monkey Ball game. According to director and producer Masao Shirosaki, they received a lot of feedback from the fans on how they "wanted original Super Monkey Ball and Super Monkey Ball 2 remakes", citing that had it not been for the voices of those fans, Banana Mania would never have come to be. The addition of support features was included to not make the game too difficult for players who have never played a Super Monkey Ball game. However, the development team did not want to change the structure of stages as they felt returning players might feel it would be an entirely different game from the originals.

The game began development around March 2020, and was developed remotely due to the COVID-19 pandemic. Development lasted for about a year and a half. The game's theme song, "Hello Banana!!", was performed in Japanese by the Banana Fritters, the members of which (Noriko Hidaka, Toshihiko Seki, and Koichi Yamadera) also voice the game's characters.

== Release ==
The game was announced on June 15, 2021, though the game had its title leaked prior to its official announcement. On April 15, the Australian Classification Board issued a rating to a game under the name, followed by Brazil on June 10. One day before the announcement, box art and screenshots were leaked online. An animated launch trailer was produced by Powerhouse Animation, featuring music by Hyper Potions.

Players who preordered the game received the "Bonus Cosmetic Pack" downloadable content (DLC) containing ten additional cosmetic customization items. A physical Anniversary Edition release comes with a collectible game sleeve, a reversible game cover, and a 40-page art book, along with a download code for the Bonus Cosmetic Pack DLC. The digital Deluxe Edition release includes four pieces of DLC, which are also available separately for purchase: the "Customization Pack" with ten additional customization items; the "Classic Character Pack", containing alternate skins for the six main characters that resemble the character models in the original Super Monkey Ball games; the "Classic Soundtrack" option, which replaces the in-game music tracks with their counterparts from the original Super Monkey Ball games; and the "Sega Legends Pack", containing three playable characters based on classic Sega game consoles: Game Gear, Sega Saturn, and Dreamcast.

== Reception ==
Reception

Aggregate scores
Aggregator	Score
Metacritic	NS: 76/100; PS4: 78/100; PS5: 75/100; XSXS: 77/100
OpenCritic	70% recommend

Review scores
Publication	Score
Destructoid	8/10
Eurogamer	Recommended
GameSpot	8/10
Hardcore Gamer	8/10
IGN	6/10
Nintendo Life	7/10
Nintendo World Report	8/10
Push Square	6/10
Shacknews	8/10
The Games Machine (Italy)	8.7/10
TouchArcade	4/5
VentureBeat	5/5
Video Games Chronicle	4/5

Upon release, Super Monkey Ball Banana Mania received "generally favorable" reviews, according to review aggregator website Metacritic. Fellow review aggregator OpenCritic assessed that the game received strong approval, being recommended by 70% of critics.

=== Sales ===
The game made it to #8 in the UK sales charts in its first week, selling more than double the copies Super Monkey Ball: Banana Blitz HD did.
