= Super Monkey Ball Jr. =

2002 video game

- North American box art
- Developers: Realism; Creations
- Publisher: Sega: NA: THQ
- Producers: Andy Onions; Marc Bowden
- Programmer: Dave Reed
- Artist: Dave Worton
- Composer: Martin Goodall
- Series: Super Monkey Ball
- Platform: Game Boy Advance
- Release: NA: November 20, 2002; PAL: April 4, 2003
- Genre: Platform
- Modes: Single-player, multiplayer

Super Monkey Ball Jr. is a platform video game developed by Realism and Creations and published by Sega for the Game Boy Advance. It is one of the few games on the system to make use of its 3D graphics capabilities. It reuses levels from other games in the Super Monkey Ball series. It was the last game to be developed by Creations before their acquisition by Acclaim Entertainment.

== Gameplay ==
Like many other games of Super Monkey Ball series, the player has the option to choose AiAi, MeeMee, Baby or GonGon. In multiplayer, two to four people can pick the same character.

=== Main game ===
As with previous entries, the objective of Super Monkey Ball Jr. is to control a monkey to reach the goal before time is over. New to this game, the player has the option to speed up or slow down the tilt by pressing the A or B Buttons respectively.

=== Party games ===
- Monkey Duel: Playable with only two players, both players race to the finish as fast as they can while picking up any nearby bananas. The winning player gets five bananas added to their overall total. The mode can be played up to five rounds and the player who has the most bananas at the end of the specified number of rounds wins. There is also an option to give one player or the other a head start, up to five seconds.

Monkey Bowling, Monkey Fight and Monkey Golf, all three mini-games that were present in Super Monkey Ball, return in this game and function exactly like their original appearances. With the exception of Monkey Fight, players can play Monkey Bowling and Monkey Golf on one Game Boy Advance system by alternating turns.

== Reception ==
Reception

Aggregate score
| Aggregator | Score |
|---|---|
| Metacritic | 82/100 |

Review scores
| Publication | Score |
|---|---|
| Eurogamer | 9/10 |
| Game Informer | 8/10 |
| GameSpot | 8/10 |
| IGN | 9/10 |

Super Monkey Ball Jr. received "generally favorable" reviews, with an average score of 82 out of 100, according to review aggregator website Metacritic, but the game was criticized for a lack of analog movement. IGN gave the game a 9/10, praising its high replayability and gameplay. GameSpot gave the game an 8/10, lauding the gameplay and its appeal to those who do not like puzzle games. Game Informer were also positive, describing it as "amazingly ambitious and well done" and having an "overall high quality" to its level, though noted that the controls "were a tad off".

In 2023, IGN named Super Monkey Ball Jr. the 25th best Game Boy Advance game of all time.
