= Super Monkey Ball Deluxe =

2005 video game

- North American Xbox cover art
- Developer: New Entertainment R&D Dept.
- Publisher: Sega
- Series: Super Monkey Ball
- Platforms: PlayStation 2 Xbox
- Release: NA: March 15, 2005; JP: March 24, 2005; EU: August 26, 2005
- Genres: Platform, party
- Modes: Single-player, multiplayer

Super Monkey Ball Deluxe is a 2005 platform video game developed and published by Sega for the PlayStation 2 and Xbox. Part of the Super Monkey Ball series, the game compiles all stages from Super Monkey Ball and Super Monkey Ball 2, as well as adding original levels. It is the first Super Monkey Ball game to not be developed by Amusement Vision, which rebranded during development.

Super Monkey Ball Deluxe was well received, with critics praising the gameplay, but criticizing its audio and graphics. The game is notable for its large number of customizable party mini-games, also returning from the previous titles. It is also notable for the stages it had restored, which were previously cut from the originals.

Super Monkey Ball Deluxe's exclusive stages were remade as a part of Super Monkey Ball Banana Mania.

== Gameplay ==
Gameplay from the Advanced extra stage "Fractal". The player must avoid falling off the edge of the platform while collecting the bananas scattered throughout the stage.

The gameplay is largely the same as the first two in the series. Much like the classic arcade game Marble Madness, the player must navigate a ball across many puzzling courses within a time limit, usually 60 seconds. The controls are very simple: the player uses the directional analog stick to move the entire floor in order to guide one of four anthropomorphic monkeys (encased in a large clear ball) towards the goal, while avoiding hazards and obstacles (for example, moving platforms, mazes, and ramps). Collecting bananas scattered throughout the stage raises the player's score, and awards extra lives. If the monkey ball falls off the edge of a platform or the time runs out, the player loses a life. If the player reaches the arch-shaped goal, the player finishes the stage and the player advances to the next stage. Higher levels have a greater challenge and complexity: most of the levels in Story Mode are characterised as Beginner, Advanced and Expert.

=== Main modes ===
Stage select screen for World 1 in Story Mode

The game has several game modes to play. The game's Story Mode is one player only, and features the same story mode featured in Super Monkey Ball 2. The plot involves the game's four protagonists, AiAi, MeeMee, Baby, and GonGon, who embark on a quest to stop the antagonist, Dr. Bad-Boon from stealing all the bananas on Jungle Island. It consists of ten worlds, each of which contains 20 levels, though only ten levels are required to be completed in order to advance to the next world. Players are allowed to select and complete levels in a world in any order they wish. A story cut-scene is played upon completion of a world. Unlike in Challenge Mode, the player has infinite lives.

Challenge Mode consists of 300 levels separated into sections based on difficulty level. Beginner difficulty has 40 stages, Advanced difficulty has 70 stages, Expert difficulty has 100 stages and Master difficulty has 20 stages. Each difficulty level also has 20 extra stages (with the exception of Master difficulty, which only has ten). This game also has an exclusive mode known as Ultimate, which tests the player's skill through every stage through the Beginner, Advanced, Expert and Master difficulties (if the player goes through the stages without continuing). Players are given three lives and five continues, but can get more lives by playing the game more. This mode can also be played with up to four players. The game also features a multiplayer mode known as Competition Mode, which allows up to four players to compete against each other on any of the maps unlocked in Challenge Mode. The same rules from the single-player Story Mode apply. The number of bananas a player collects determines which player is victorious.

Lastly, Practice Mode allows players to practice any of the unlocked levels from Story Mode or Challenge Mode. Whether failed or completed, the stage will replay indefinitely until the player quits.

=== Party games ===
Players can compete in a selection of mini-games known as "party games". All games are up to four players (which may include CPU controlled characters) and the player(s) may choose any of the four main monkey characters to play. All 12 party games from Super Monkey Ball 2 return in Deluxe, unlocked and available to play from the start. Available party games are listed below:

Monkey Race DX

In Monkey Race DX, the monkeys race around a course in their monkey balls and collect power ups to disrupt the opposition. The player wins by being the first to cross the finish line. This game mode can be played to up to four players. You can race on a single course on One Course Race Mode and you can enter a series races in the Grand Prix Mode. The player can also try to get the best time on a track in Time Attack Mode.

Monkey Fight DX

The aim of Monkey Fight DX is to knock off all the other monkeys on a stage. The monkeys have an extendable boxing glove to knock out other monkeys on the platform. The two modes are Normal mode where you get points for knocking monkeys out of the stage, and Survival Mode where the player has to remain on the stage to win. Players can also collect power ups that make knocking opponents off the stage easier.

Monkey Target DX

The aim of Monkey Target DX is to land on the target at the bottom of a steep ramp, scoring as many points as you can. The player rolls their monkey down a ramp to gain speed and momentum. When the monkey rolls off the ramp the player can open the monkey's ball which now acts as their glider. The player will eventually come across a landing pad where different areas of the platform have more points. The player can then land their monkey by turning their monkey's glider back into a monkey ball and they will be given the points allocated by the area where they have landed.

Monkey Boat

In Monkey Boat, the monkeys use their monkey balls as boats. The player can race on a single course in One Course Race Mode, race a series of races in Grand Prix Mode, or try to get the best time in a course in Time Attack Mode. The player must control the paddling of the boat to successfully move. The player can also get power ups in the course to sabotage their opponents with traps and weapons.

Monkey Shot

Monkey Shot is in the style of an old-school arcade shooter game. The player must shoot as many flying insects as they can while avoiding the missiles headed their way. The player can also find various bonus items either inside a ball or held by an enemy. In multiplayer mode, the winner is the player with the most points at the end of the stage.

Monkey Dogfight

Monkey Dogfight is a multiplayer combative game where the player must target and shoot the other players. The player's chosen monkey flies around a large plane using "wings" crafted from its monkey ball split in half. Ordinary bullets or lock-on missiles may be used to lower the enemy's health. When a player loses all their health, they respawn from the starting position. While each monkey has unlimited lives, the player who scores the most hits against other players is declared the winner.

Monkey Soccer

In the style of traditional 2-player soccer video games, Monkey Soccer is a five-a-side game on a small field, played for 60 seconds each half by default. There are four team types: normal, offensive, defensive and handicap. The game also includes Tournament and Penalty Kick Shootout modes.

Monkey Baseball

A baseball-type game for two players, Monkey Baseball has one player as batter with an oversized baseball bat, and another as "pitcher", who throws the entire monkey in its ball towards the batter. Instead of fielders, the pitch has a number of "pockets" at the edges which determine the effect of a successful bat (foul, out etc.) and "jump fields", which go up to block the ball from going in the pockets. The distribution of pockets and jump fields is determined randomly by a roulette at the start of the innings. A Tournament mode is also available.

Monkey Tennis

A singles or doubles tennis game for up to four players. The rules are largely the same as ordinary tennis. Depending on the return from the other player, the player may see a Smash Mark displayed on their side of the court. If the player stands on this mark hitting the ball, there will be a much more powerful return. A Tournament mode is available.

Monkey Golf DX

The rules of Monkey Golf DX are similar to Mini Golf. The player aims the monkey ball into a hole in each course. If the ball goes out of bounds, a one shot penalty is added and the player must take their next shot in the same position. After the player has taken at least nine strokes on any hole, the player is automatically forced to give up and receives ten points. This party game has two modes: Stroke play and Match play. In Stroke play, you play all the holes (nine or 18) and aim for the lowest score. This mode can be played up to four players and each player takes their shots in turn. Match Play involves two players playing a course for the lowest number of shots and the player who wins the hole will obtain the points. The player who wins the most games is the winner.

Monkey Bowling DX

The style of Monkey Bowling DX is similar to Ten Pin Bowling. This party game can be played up to four players. You can play Normal mode or two additional sets of rules: 9 Pins and Strike. The nine-pin rule is where there will be one pin missing in each lane. The missing pin will be counted towards the player's score and where the missing pin is placed will vary in each frame. Strike Rule has ten pins for each frame but you'll only have one throw each frame in a 20 frame game. There is also Special mode where each of the lanes will be oddly shaped. Challenge mode lets you select pin arrangement and give a limited number of tries to knock all the pins down.

Monkey Billiards DX

The style of Monkey Billiards DX is similar to the game Billiards. This game can be played for up to three players. The different rules that these party games can be played are US Nine-ball, Japan Nine-Ball, Eight-ball or Rotation. One player can also play Tournament mode where the player plays a series of games incorporating each rule system against the computer. Each player turn uses the cue ball to knock colored monkey balls into pockets. Which colored balls that the player can pocket depends on which rules that player is using. If the player pockets the cue ball or hits the wrong colored ball first then the player is given a foul, giving the opponent an advantage. If a player pockets the correct colored ball, the player is given another shot instantly.

== Characters ==
The playable characters, from left to right: MeeMee, AiAi, Baby, and GonGon.

Super Monkey Ball Deluxe features four playable characters: AiAi, MeeMee, Baby and GonGon. AiAi is the main protagonist and the only playable character in Story Mode. He is accompanied by MeeMee, his girlfriend; GonGon, his friend and former rival; and Baby, his and MeeMee's future child who travels back in time to aid them.

The game's main antagonist is Dr. Bad-Boon, an evil, genius scientist from the future. In the future world, he had fallen in love with MeeMee and asked her to marry him, but was rejected due to her marriage to AiAi. Subsequently, Dr. Bad-Boon went back in time before AiAi and MeeMee were married, and makes attempts to keep them from marrying. Dr. Bad-Boon in turn terrorizes the rest of the land's inhabitants as well. He also has a nameless assistant, who, no matter how badly Dr. Bad-Boon treats him, remains loyal.

== Reception ==
Reception

Aggregate scores
Aggregator	Score
GameRankings	(Xbox) 80.48% (PS2) 77.48%
Metacritic	(Xbox) 81/100 (PS2) 78/100

Review scores
Publication	Score
1Up.com	B+
Eurogamer	8/10
G4	4/5
GameSpot	7.9/10
GameSpy	3.5/5
IGN	8.4/10
PlayStation Official Magazine – UK	8/10
Official Xbox Magazine (US)	72/100

Super Monkey Ball Deluxe has been given positive reviews, particularly for the Xbox version of the game. On the review aggregator website Metacritic, it has an average score of 81/100 for the Xbox version and a 78/100 for the PlayStation 2 version. Another review aggregator website, GameRankings, gave similar results, with the Xbox version scoring an 80.48% and the PlayStation 2 version scoring a 77.48%.

GameSpot gave both versions of the game 7.9/10 commenting that: "The Monkey Ball series has always been about establishing a whimsical, energetic feel, and that still comes across in Deluxe." 1UP gave the Xbox release of the game a B+ has citing that: "If you enjoy and are up for the challenge, the adrenaline rush and controller-clutching is all yours". Eurogamer, which gave the game a score of 8/10, noticed that the game's Story Mode is easier and the mini games are unlocked by default, which they think is: "the developer's determination to open the game up to a much larger audience." As a port of its previous games, GameSpy considers it as: "the "Director's Cut" of the series, crammed with bells, whistles, and other trinkets of awesomeness", giving it 3.5 out of 5 stars for the PlayStation 2 version of the game. G4TV, which gave the game a score of 4/5 for the Xbox version, have commented that the game provides a lot of content for its retail price, expressing that it is "A whole lot of monkey balling to be had for your buck".

Critics have commented on the lack of online functionality as a missed opportunity, especially when it comes to multiplayer in the mini games. IGN, which gave the game an 8.4/10 on the Xbox, have said that: "It boggles the mind to think of the possibilities of online Monkey Ball tournaments and leaderboards." This publication has also criticized the sound effects, that they are "almost abrasive and will quickly annoy anyone within hearing distance who isn't playing." GameSpot has criticized the PlayStation 2 version's graphics as they "don't feel as crisp as they did when they first arrived on the GameCube". Critics have deemed the PlayStation 2 version of the game as inferior to the Xbox. GameSpy said the PlayStation 2 release "suffer from the frankly ridiculous load times and slowdown". G4TV have also commented that the game doesn't offer anything for fans of the Super Monkey Ball series, stating that: "If you've played it before on GameCube, you've seen it all before".
