= Super Monkey Ball: Touch & Roll =

2005 video game

- North American cover art
- Developer: New Entertainment R&D Dept.
- Publisher: Sega
- Director: Toshihiro Nagoshi
- Producer: Toshihiro Nagoshi
- Designer: Yukio Oda
- Artist: Saizo Nagai
- Composer: Chiho Kobayashi
- Series: Super Monkey Ball
- Platform: Nintendo DS
- Release: JP: December 1, 2005; NA: February 21, 2006; PAL: February 17, 2006
- Genre: Platform
- Modes: Single-player, multiplayer

Super Monkey Ball: Touch & Roll is a platform video game developed and published by Sega for the Nintendo DS. It is an installment of the Super Monkey Ball series. It uses the DS's touch screen as the primary controller for maneuvering the monkey around the level, although D-pad control is also supported.

== Gameplay ==
Super Monkey Ball: Touch & Roll has two different modes: "Party" and "Main". There are six minigames: Race, War, Bowling, Air Hockey, Golf, and Fight. Main has a Challenge Mode in which the player can try to beat the levels in a world without running out of lives, or Practice Mode. There are 12 worlds in total, ten of which are unlocked as the player progresses, and the last two being hidden worlds.

As in previous Super Monkey Ball games, the object is to roll a monkey from the start of a level to the finish line within an allotted time limit. Along the way, the monkey collects bananas and banana bunches, worth five bananas, for the chance to gain an extra life, after getting ten bananas. There are no continues in this game if the player runs out of lives, unlike in other installments. Characters include AiAi, MeeMee, Baby and GonGon.

== Reception ==
Reception

Aggregate score
Aggregator	Score
Metacritic	63/100

Review scores
Publication	Score
Eurogamer	6/10
GameSpot	6.6/10
GameSpy	2.5/5
GamesRadar+	3.5/5
GameZone	6.9/10
IGN	6.5/10

Super Monkey Ball: Touch & Roll received mixed reviews. On Metacritic, the game holds a score of 63/100 based on 40 reviews.
