= Super Monkey Ball: Banana Splitz =

2012 video game

- Developer: Marvelous AQL
- Publisher: Sega
- Directors: Jun Tokuhara; Yuichiro Shirai
- Producer: Jun Tokuhara
- Designer: Junichi Morita
- Programmer: Noboru Yanagisawa
- Composers: Saori Kobayashi; Yoshitaka Hirota
- Series: Super Monkey Ball
- Platform: PlayStation Vita
- Release: JP: June 14, 2012; NA: October 23, 2012; EU: October 24, 2012; AU: October 26, 2012
- Genres: Platform, party
- Modes: Single-player, multiplayer

Super Monkey Ball: Banana Splitz (Note: Known as Super Monkey Ball: Tokumori Asobita! (スーパーモンキーボール 特盛あそビ～タ！) in Japan) is a 2012 platform video game developed by Marvelous AQL and published by Sega for the PlayStation Vita. It is part of the Super Monkey Ball series. The game was released early on in the Vita's lifespan, in June 2012 in Japan, and in October in Western regions. Similar to the previous entries, players guide a monkey encased by sphere through maze-like platforms.

Reviewers were mixed on the game's merits; while some appreciated the game's core gameplay, others felt it was too redundant to prior entries. The game did not perform well commercially, and was the last original entry in the series to be released solely on a portable video game console until 2024's Super Monkey Ball Banana Rumble for the Nintendo Switch.

== Gameplay ==
The gameplay is largely similar to the gameplay of prior entries in the Super Monkey Ball series. The game is split into two main components - the main game, and the side mini-games.

=== Main game ===
The main game involves the player guiding a monkey encased by sphere through a maze-like level of an obstacle course. Each level is completed by directing the monkey through an end-goal gate before the time limit, using either the joystick or tilt-based motion control. If the monkey falls off the edge of a level or the time limit reaches zero, a life is lost. Losing all the lives ends the game. Floating bananas are also scattered throughout levels; collecting them increases the player's score and leads to earning further lives. In addition to over 100 pre-made levels, user-generated mazes can be created in the game's "Creation Mode" in which real-life photo's taken from the PlayStation Vita's camera are roughly converted into a maze for playing in the game.

=== Minigames ===
In addition to the main game, there is a collection of eight mini-games. "Monkey Target" involves launching monkeys off a ramp and onto a dart board like platform, gaining points based on where the monkey lands. "Love Maze" involves controlling two monkeys at the same time, one with each of the Vita's joysticks, and moving them through separate halves of an obstacle course concurrently from a top-down perspective, similar to the game Kuri Kuri Mix. "Monkey Bowling", as the name suggests, is a game of bowling, but with different shaped lanes and obstacles to avoid. "Monkey Billiards" is a four-player concurrent variant of billiards with obstacles placed on the table. "Monkey Bingo" is a variant of the game bingo. "Monkey Rodeo" involves a free-for-all where the player is placed in an area where they must collect bananas and attack other opponents to steal their bananas. "Number Ball" involves selecting balls in the correct order. Lastly, "Pixie Hunt" involves the use of the Vita hardware's camera function; the game tells the player a color, and the player must take a picture of something with the described color. Dependent on if and how well the color was captured, a number of pixies appear for the player to collect for points.

== Development ==
The game was first announced in September 2011, prior to the release of the Vita, and was initially scheduled to be released in "early 2012" placing it as a title in the platform's "launch window". A 50% complete build of the game was made playable at a Sega press event in New York that October. However, its release was later pushed back mid-2012, and then finally June in Japan and October for North America and Europe. Unlike most entries in the series, the game was not developed internally by Sega, but rather by Marvelous AQL. The game's Japanese release contained a code to download a level based around Japanese super model Yukie Kawamura (making the game receiving a C rating by CERO instead of the A one, which most games of the series received). This content was not included in the game's North American release. The game was not made compatible with PlayStation TV, the home video game console variant of the Vita.

== Reception and sales ==
Reception

Aggregate score
Aggregator	Score
Metacritic	66/100

Review scores
Publication	Score
Destructoid	5.5/10
Eurogamer	6/10
GameSpot	5/10
Hardcore Gamer	4/5
Pocket Gamer	4/5
Push Square	7/10

The game received generally mixed reviews from critics. At Metacritic, which assigns a normalized rating out of 100 to reviews from mainstream critics, the game has an average score of 66 out of 100, which indicates "mixed or average reviews" based on 31 reviews. Many critics' criticisms revolved around the premise and trajectory on the series in general; the initial Super Monkey Ball games were well-received due to in part of the simple premise, subsequent game's efforts to add to it made it lose its simple charm, while later entries, such as Banana Blitz, was seen as an attempt to return the series to its roots, but it now, in effect, lacked the originality of the original games. Reviewers were divided on many aspects of the game. While some reviewers praised the game's tilt-based motion control input for directing the monkey, other reviewers panned the motion controls for being imprecise compared to using the joysticks. Similarly, while some reviewers like Game Revolution praised the game's ability to create levels off of photographs taken with the Vita hardware, reviewers more frequently complained that it rarely created levels that were fun or resembled the original photograph. In regards to the mini-games, "Love Maze" was singled out as a stand-out aspect of the game.

The game did not perform well commercially, with it failing to chart any of the major video game charts; it did not make the UK's top 40 weekly chart, Japan's top 20 weekly chart, or North America's monthly chart. The next installment in the franchise, Super Monkey Ball Bounce, released for iOS in 2014, and played entirely differently from other entries in the series, instead playing more like Peggle and Pachinko games.
