= Super Monkey Ball =

Video game series

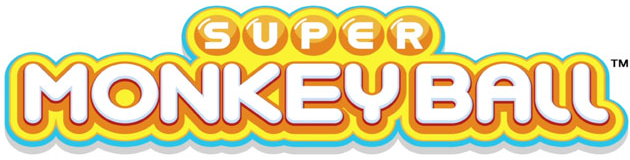
- Logo used from 2006–2019
- Genres: Platform, party
- Developers: Amusement Vision (2001–2004); Sega (2005–2012); Traveller's Tales (2006); Marvelous AQL (2012–2018); RGG Studio (2019–present)
- Publisher: Sega
- Creator: Toshihiro Nagoshi
- Platforms: Android; Arcade; GameCube; Game Boy Advance; iOS; Microsoft Windows; Nintendo 3DS; Nintendo DS; Nintendo Switch; N-Gage; PlayStation 2; PlayStation 4; PlayStation 5; PlayStation Portable; PlayStation Vita; Wii; Xbox; Xbox One; Xbox Series X/S
- First release: Monkey Ball; June 23, 2001
- Latest release: Super Monkey Ball Banana Rumble; June 25, 2024

Super Monkey Ball is a series of platform video games initially developed by Amusement Vision (now RGG Studio) and published by Sega. The series debuted in 2001 with the arcade game Monkey Ball, which was ported to GameCube as Super Monkey Ball later that year. Several sequels and ports have been released.

The gameplay involves moving one of several monkey characters in a ball through an obstacle course to a goal, with a time limit. Bananas can be collected for extra points. In addition, several minigames can be played, making the series party games as well.

== Games ==
Release timeline
2001	Monkey Ball
2001	Super Monkey Ball
2002	Super Monkey Ball 2
2002	Super Monkey Ball Jr.
2003	Super Monkey Ball (N-Gage)
2004
2005	Super Monkey Ball Deluxe
2005	Super Monkey Ball: Touch & Roll
2006	Super Monkey Ball Adventure
2006	Super Monkey Ball: Banana Blitz
2007	Super Monkey Ball: Tip 'n Tilt
2008	Super Monkey Ball (iOS)
2008	Super Monkey Ball: Tip 'n Tilt 2
2009	Super Monkey Ball 2 (iOS)
2010	Super Monkey Ball 2: Sakura Edition
2010	Super Monkey Ball: Step & Roll
2011	Super Monkey Ball: Ticket Blitz
2011	Super Monkey Ball 3D
2012	Super Monkey Ball: Banana Splitz
2013
2014	Super Monkey Ball Bounce
2015
2016
2017
2018
2019	Super Monkey Ball: Banana Blitz HD
2020
2021	Super Monkey Ball Banana Mania
2022
2023
2024	Super Monkey Ball Banana Rumble

- Monkey Ball (arcade) (June 23, 2001)
- Super Monkey Ball (GameCube) (September 14, 2001)
- Super Monkey Ball 2 (GameCube) (August 25, 2002)
- Super Monkey Ball Jr. (Game Boy Advance) (November 19, 2002)
- Super Monkey Ball (N-Gage) (October 7, 2003)
- Super Monkey Ball Deluxe (PlayStation 2 and Xbox) (March 15, 2005)
- Super Monkey Ball: Touch & Roll (Nintendo DS) (December 1, 2005)
- Super Monkey Ball Adventure (PlayStation 2, GameCube, PlayStation Portable) (June 30, 2006)
- Super Monkey Ball: Banana Blitz (Wii) (November 19, 2006)
- Super Monkey Ball: Tip 'n Tilt (J2ME) (2007)
- Super Monkey Ball (iOS, Windows Phone) (July 10, 2008 for iOS, March 18, 2011 for Windows Phone)
- Super Monkey Ball: Tip 'n Tilt 2 (J2ME) (2008)
- Super Monkey Ball 2 (iOS) (2009)
- Super Monkey Ball 2: Sakura Edition (iOS, Android, Windows Phone) (2010, re-released in 2018 for Android)
- Super Monkey Ball: Step & Roll (Wii) (February 9, 2010)
- Super Monkey Ball: Ticket Blitz (Arcade) (2011)
- Super Monkey Ball 3D (Nintendo 3DS) (March 3, 2011)
- Super Monkey Ball: Banana Splitz (PlayStation Vita) (June 14, 2012)
- Super Monkey Ball Bounce (Android, iOS) (2014)
- Super Monkey Ball: Banana Blitz HD (Windows, Nintendo Switch, PlayStation 4, Xbox One) (October 29, 2019 for Nintendo Switch, PlayStation 4, and Xbox One, December 10, 2019 for Windows)
- Super Monkey Ball Banana Mania (Windows, Nintendo Switch, PlayStation 4, PlayStation 5, Xbox One, Xbox Series X/S) (October 5, 2021) (May 12, 2022 for Amazon Luna)
- Super Monkey Ball Banana Rumble (Nintendo Switch) (June 25, 2024)

== Gameplay ==
As opposed to normal games where the player takes control of the character itself, Super Monkey Ball has the player move their character around in a gachapon ball by tilting the direction gravity pulls them down (the exception of this being Super Monkey Ball Adventure). By tilting gravity at various angles, players can control the speed and turning of the character. The goal of each level is to reach the goal gate before the timer runs out, and without falling off the floor. Bonus points and extra lives can be earned by collecting bananas on the stage. Early games use traditional controllers to play while many recent titles utilize modern technology, such as the accelerometers of the Wii and iPhone titles. The gameplay is similar to Atari Games' 1984 arcade video game Marble Madness.

== Characters ==
From left to right: MeeMee, Baby, AiAi and GonGon

The original Monkey Ball arcade cabinet featured three playable characters: the primary protagonist AiAi, his wife MeeMee, and their son Baby, who has traveled back in time from the future; a fourth, AiAi's best friend and former rival GonGon, was added in the game's GameCube port, Super Monkey Ball. These four have become the primary characters of the series, appearing in every subsequent title to date. Two new characters, the martial artist lemur YanYan and the amnesiac scientist Doctor, were introduced in Super Monkey Ball: Banana Blitz, while another two, athletic trainer Jam and AiAi's archrival Jet, first appeared in Super Monkey Ball: Step & Roll and Super Monkey Ball 3D, respectively. Another character was introduced in Super Monkey Ball Banana Rumble named Palette, an adventurer. Several games feature unlockable variations of these characters wearing alternate costumes, along with occasional guest playable characters such as Sonic the Hedgehog. Some games such as Super Monkey Ball 2 and Super Monkey Ball Adventure have also featured various non-player characters, such as the villainous Dr. Bad-Boon, a scientist from Baby's time who travels to the past to prevent MeeMee from marrying AiAi and take her as his bride.

Characters from the Super Monkey Ball series have been featured in other Sega titles. AiAi has appeared as a playable character in Sonic Riders, Sonic & Sega All-Stars Racing and as free downloadable content in Sonic Racing: CrossWorlds, while both AiAi and MeeMee make playable appearances in Sega Superstars Tennis and Sonic & All-Stars Racing Transformed. AiAi was also featured in Archie Comics' adaptation of Sonic & All-Stars Racing Transformed in issue #45 of Sonic Universe.

== Legacy ==
By December 2006, the franchise had sold 4 million copies. As of July 2024, the franchise has sold over 5 million units.

The iOS version was one of the first games on the Apple App Store, using the device's accelerometer to identify how it was being tilted, making the phone a positional game controller as well as display. It was spotlighted during the store's announcement in 2008, becoming the best selling app on launch day.

In 2009, Edge ranked the first Super Monkey Ball #39 on its list of "The 100 Best Games To Play Today". Writing in 1001 Video Games You Must Play Before You Die, Christian Donlan described Super Monkey Ball as "one of Sega's grade-A triumphs". An enhanced engine of the GameCube games was used in F-Zero GX, which was critically acclaimed and Nintendo considered a step forward for the franchise. The developers of Super Monkey Ball went on to make the Like a Dragon series.

When commenting on the differences of the franchise between the GameCube games and the Wii entries with Banana Blitz and Step & Roll in a Tokyo Game Show 2009 interview, Toshihiro Nagoshi stated that they were made easier for kids and families. However, he stated that if they got the chance, they definitely would like to go back and make a game in the style of the old games that particularly the fans overseas want. Due to the older demographic of the PlayStation Vita, the difficulty for Super Monkey Ball: Banana Splitz was made more on par with the GameCube entries.

In 2015, the mobile games were removed from App Store and Google Play.

The 2020 battle royale game Fall Guys: Ultimate Knockout has been described as "Super Monkey Ball for the Fortnite generation" by Tom Wiggins of Stuff magazine.

In 2023, the emulator touchHLE was released, supporting the 2008 original iOS version of the game.
