= Super Monkey Ball Adventure =

2006 video game

- PAL region PlayStation 2 cover art
- Developer: Traveller's Tales
- Publisher: Sega
- Director: Paul Gardner
- Producer: Graeme Monk
- Designer: Neall Jones
- Artist: Dave Walsh
- Composer: Simon Forster
- Series: Super Monkey Ball
- Platforms: PlayStation 2; PlayStation Portable; GameCube
- Release: PlayStation 2: EU: June 30, 2006; NA: August 1, 2006; AU: August 15, 2006; PlayStation Portable: EU: June 30, 2006; AU: August 15, 2006; NA: August 29, 2006; GameCube: EU: July 14, 2006; NA: August 1, 2006; AU: August 15, 2006
- Genre: Platform
- Modes: Single-player, multiplayer

Super Monkey Ball Adventure is a 2006 platform video game developed by Traveller's Tales and published by Sega. Part of the Super Monkey Ball series, it was released for the PlayStation 2, PlayStation Portable and GameCube.

Super Monkey Ball Adventure is a departure from the series in the sense that the puzzle-based gameplay is replaced by a more traditional 3D platform game world. Traveller's Tales has retained some of the mini-games, however, and integrated the features into the gameplay. Some new mini-games are also integrated into the adventure world. The game received mixed to negative reviews from critics, who derided the game's controls, difficulty, and gameplay shift, with some deeming it the worst installment in the series, though the soundtrack was praised.

== Plot ==
AiAi, MeeMee, Baby and GonGon are barbecuing bananas on Jungle Island when, all of a sudden, the alarm bells of the Tree Palace sound. King Junjun of Jungle Island tells them the sorrow and naysayers that have spread throughout the five kingdoms, brought on by Prince AbeABE of Monkitropolis and Princess Dee-Dee of Kongri-la's visit to the island. Once the prince and princess's identities are revealed, their true love for each other is, too. King Junjun and the Super Monkey Ball team work together to bring on the wedding of the year - but it is not easy. Monkitropolis and Kongri-la are great rivals, and before the wedding can happen, AiAi and friends must help bring peace to them.

If the game is 100% completed, a visit from AiAi from the future will tell how the monkeys are inside magic energy balls, which are invented by AiAi and GonGon from a later time period, which is the reason the monkeys have balls. Baby returns home with this version of his father.

== Gameplay ==
=== Story Mode ===
There are five main worlds, or "Monkey Kingdoms", through which the player progresses: Jungle Island, Moonhaven, Zootopia, Monkitropolis, and Kongri-la. The goal of the game is to unite the feuding kingdoms of Monkitropolis and Kongri-la. Follow the normal story and complete over 60 quests from the monkeys around the Monkey World, using up to three different files.

There are on average, four sections to each world. To enter a different section, the player must wait several seconds. During that time, the game depicts the entire level from a high angle, showing everything in the level in an animated style. The same style shows up when AiAi teleports to another level. It depicts the four main monkeys blasting off into the sky while loading the level.

Missions involve helping haywire problems going back to normal, fixing machines, and helping local monkeys out. Pospos the mailmonkey helps deliver messages to some characters invited to the wedding for a band reunion. However, he needs a little help remembering their name.

Although the player has to bring peace back to the five islands, there are some monsters, called "Naysayers", trying to stop them. These Naysayers are monsters that are formed from sorrow, as the peace had become disturbed. In order to advance to the next world, the player must complete at least 60% of missions in each world. Some missions are simple, while others are lengthier and challenging.

=== Challenge Mode ===
Re-visit puzzle stages that have been unlocked in the game and compete for high scores (possibly to win bananas that can be used to unlock new items). Unlike all the other games, Super Monkey Ball Adventure has no practice mode to practice levels that were previously completed by the player. These levels are contained in story mode.

Like all games in the Super Monkey Ball franchise, the player must control their selected monkey of the four main characters (AiAi, MeeMee, Baby and GonGon) with the analog stick to cross platforms, to reach the goal in a time limit of a minute. The goal is a circle-shape with a party ball on above a banner reading "GOAL". The monkey must pass through it to complete the stage, breaking open the party ball and celebrating. Falling off the platforms or letting the timer reach zero causes the player to lose a life. Fifty bananas are required to gain a life, which are usually placed in corners of levels and hard-to-reach and risky places.

The monkeys have unlimited lives here, with the choice to give up and return to the game. The levels are themed as the same as the main Monkey Kingdoms, depending on the difficulty (ex. Jungle Island's color, green, and backdrop is used for the beginner levels). Also, a feature removed is that there are no extra stages added on to the Beginner, Advanced and Expert modes. There are 49 stages; 12 beginner, 20 advanced and 17 expert. Stages have several random music tracks playing, some from previous Monkey Ball games.

During Story mode, these levels are in areas of the Monkey Kingdoms. In order to unlock new areas of the Kingdom, AiAi must complete a majority of the levels to progress. Stages come in bunches of four to ten stages per area.

=== Party games ===
There are six different available mini-games, complete with multi-player support, with 20 selectable characters to choose from. Additional features beyond the basic ones are unlocked through an NPC-Store using bananas gathered during adventure mode.

== Development ==
Whereas previous Super Monkey Ball games focused mainly on innovative gameplay, Sega emphasized plot in Super Monkey Ball Adventure as a move to make the game more accessible.

== Reception ==
Reception

Aggregate score
Aggregator	Score
Metacritic	(PS2) 53/100 (GC) 53/100 (PSP) 56/100

Review scores
Publication	Score
GamePro	5/10
GameSpot	5.7/10
GameZone	5.9/10
IGN	4.8/10
Nintendo Power	5.5/10
X-Play	1/5

Super Monkey Ball Adventure received "mixed or average reviews" from critics on all platforms, according to the review aggregator website Metacritic. It obtained a rare ranking of zero percent on Rotten Tomatoes' video game section. The game was criticized for the series’ unwelcome shift to platform-adventure gameplay, controls, and difficulty, with many publications deeming it the worst in the series. Nintendo Power gave the game a 5.5 out of 10 rating and it, along with many other sources, claimed it was the worst installment thus far in the Super Monkey Ball series. X-Play gave it a one out of five. IGN gave the game a "Bad" rating at 4.8 out of 10, criticizing the gameplay and difficulty, but the game's soundtrack was highly praised.
