= Super Monkey Ball: Banana Blitz =

2006 video game

- North American Wii box art
- Developer: New Entertainment R&D Dept.
- Publisher: Sega
- Director: Toshihiro Nagoshi
- Producer: Toshihiro Nagoshi
- Designer: Yukio Oda
- Artist: Saizo Nagai
- Composer: Yasushi Asada
- Series: Super Monkey Ball
- Platform: Wii
- Release: NA: November 19, 2006; JP: December 2, 2006; AU: December 7, 2006; EU: December 8, 2006
- Genres: Platform, party
- Modes: Single-player, multiplayer

Super Monkey Ball: Banana Blitz (Note: Known in Japan as Super Monkey Ball Ukiuki Party Daishūgō (Japanese: スーパーモンキーボール ウキウキパーティー大集合, Hepburn: Sūpā Monkī Bōru Ukiuki Pātī Daishūgō)) is a platform game developed and published by Sega, the seventh title in the Super Monkey Ball series, following Super Monkey Ball Adventure. It was released as a launch title for the Wii system on November 19, 2006, in North America, December 7 in Australia and December 8 in Europe.

An HD remake, Super Monkey Ball: Banana Blitz HD, (Note: Known in Japan as Tabegoro! Super Monkey Ball (Japanese: たべごろ！スーパーモンキーボール, Hepburn: Tabegoro! Sūpā Monkī Bōru)) was released worldwide on October 29, 2019, for the Nintendo Switch, PlayStation 4 and Xbox One, and in December for Windows via Steam. The Nintendo Switch and PlayStation 4 versions were also released in Japan on October 31.

== Gameplay ==
The game spans a total of 100 main game levels, and 50 mini-games that each use the controller in a different way (e.g. "Monkey Darts" has players simulate the action of throwing a dart using the Wii Remote) as well as the appearance of all major characters featured in past games. Unlike previous games in the Super Monkey Ball series, this game features eight boss battles, a feature new to the franchise. The Wii controller is held parallel to the ground, with the monkey character rolling based on the slope of the game world, directly corresponding with the relative tilt of the Wii controller. For the first time in a Super Monkey Ball game, players are able to jump by quickly flicking the controller up while holding B, or by simply pressing the A button. The game also features character-specific abilities and stats for the puzzle stages, previously unseen in any other game in the series.

=== Mini-games ===
There are 50 mini-games in total in Banana Blitz. There is also a "party" mode whereby players can choose tournament-type gameplay, selecting mini-games in an attempt to accumulate the most points. Recurring mini-games from previous titles include Monkey Target, Monkey Race, Monkey Bowling and Monkey Wars.

== Plot ==
Banana Blitz introduces a new pirate-like villain named Captain Crabuchin, previously confused with Dr. Bad-Boon. He has stolen the Golden Banana Bunch, and AiAi and his friends are on an adventure to recover the scattered pieces of it.

== Reception ==
Reception

Aggregate scores
Aggregator	Score
GameRankings	72.82%
Metacritic	74/100

Review scores
Publication	Score
Game Informer	6.75/10
GamePro	2.75/5
GameSpot	8.3/10
GameSpy	4/5
GameTrailers	7.2/10
IGN	8.4/10
Nintendo Power	8.5/10
Nintendo World Report	5.5/10

Super Monkey Ball: Banana Blitz received "mixed or average" reviews from critics, according to review aggregator website Metacritic. EGM awarded the game a 6.2, stating that the new Wii Remote-based control scheme made the game excessively difficult but enjoyed the large number of games even if a few were not fun, whereas IGN said the controls simply had a relatively steep learning curve, and once the player is used to them, are superior to control using an analog stick. GameSpot also praised the controls but criticized the single player game for its brevity. All three found the new cel-shaded visuals a little simplistic, although noting that it was well-suited to the tone of the game. GameSpot also stated that Banana Blitz was one of the "best in the series". Hyper's Kosta Andreadis commends the game for its "standout party games, great use of Wii-mote for main game and its multiplayer mode". However, he criticized its boss battles, stating that they "can get tedious [and] certain party games are atrocious".

=== Sales ===
As of December 31, 2006, the game sold 350,000 copies in North America. The game sold a total of 38,600 units in Japan.

== Remake ==
Super Monkey Ball: Banana Blitz HD
- PS4 western cover art
- Developer: Ryu Ga Gotoku Studio
- Publisher: Sega
- Director: Masao Shirosaki
- Producer: Masao Shirosaki
- Designer: Taisho Kin
- Artist: Yukio Oda
- Composers: Yuri Fukuda; Hidenori Shoji; Chihiro Aoki
- Series: Super Monkey Ball
- Engine: Unity
- Platforms: Nintendo Switch; PlayStation 4; Xbox One; Windows
- Release: October 29, 2019: Nintendo Switch, PlayStation 4; WW: October 29, 2019; JP/AS: October 31, 2019 Xbox One; WW: October 29, 2019 Windows; WW: December 10, 2019
- Genre: Platform
- Modes: Single-player, multiplayer

The HD remake under the title Super Monkey Ball: Banana Blitz HD was announced in July 2019, via a Famitsu issue, along with screenshots of the game and the box cover. Shortly after, Sega officially announced the game for a worldwide release. Development began after Masao Shirosaki was pondering what to work on next after finishing development on Judgment; before that, they had a tough time getting a team together. However, after Judgment, him and a few others had some downtime and got together in January 2019. The project was greenlit in February and development lasted for around 6 months. According to Shirosaki, some of the levels would've been too easy with the stick input, as they were originally designed with the Wii remote in mind. This means that some levels had to undergo some adjustments to become more enjoyable with current controls. Tweaks were made all the way up until the end. When asked in a later interview of why Banana Blitz specifically was chosen for a remaster, Shirosaki revealed that due to the time and budget they had, it was the most reasonable choice.

The remake features revamped controls, such as the ability to use the console's respective controller, as opposed the Wii Remote in the original version. As the game was nearing 13 years old by 2019, they consulted with the designers to rework the UI to mesh with "modern visual aesthetics". The remake also features new modes, such as a Time Attack Mode with online leaderboards, and the all-new "Decathlon Mode", which is a mode where the player "challenges themselves to beat ten mini-games in a row". Players are able to unlock new costumes for each of the returning characters, as well as Sonic the Hedgehog as a playable character, with all bananas replaced with rings.

Unlike the original, instead of the 50 mini-games, it includes enhancements of the ten most popular mini-games. The game features a different soundtrack in most of the worlds, due to licensing issues.

Reception

Aggregate score
Aggregator	Score
Metacritic	(PS4) 62/100 (XONE) 70/100 (NS) 63/100

Review scores
Publication	Score
Destructoid	7/10
GameSpot	5/10
Hardcore Gamer	3.5/5
Nintendo Life	6/10
Nintendo World Report	5.5/10
Push Square	4/10
Shacknews	5/10

== Notes ==
Translations: スーパーモンキーボールウキウキパーティー大集合: Super Monkey Ball: Exciting Party Large Gathering.
たべごろ！ スーパーモンキーボール: It's time to eat! Super Monkey Ball.
