= Super Monkey Ball 3D =

2011 video game

- Developer: Sega CS1 R&D
- Publisher: Sega
- Director: Jun Tokuhara
- Producers: Yasuhito Baba; Jun Orihara
- Composers: Hideki Naganuma; Keiichi Sugiyama; Yutaka Akiyama; Chiho Kobayashi
- Series: Super Monkey Ball
- Platform: Nintendo 3DS
- Release: JP: March 3, 2011; EU: March 25, 2011; NA: March 27, 2011; AU: March 31, 2011
- Genres: Platform, party
- Modes: Single-player, multiplayer

Super Monkey Ball 3D (Note: Japanese: スーパーモンキーボール 3D) is a 2011 platform video game developed and published by Sega for the Nintendo 3DS handheld game console. An installment of the Super Monkey Ball series, players can use either the Circle Pad or the internal gyroscope of the Nintendo 3DS to navigate AiAi and the others so they can collect as many bananas as possible within the time limit as in previous games in the series.

== Gameplay ==
Super Monkey Ball 3D supports three full-featured gameplay modes: traditional Super Monkey Ball puzzles, "Monkey Race" in which players race each other in frantic car battles, and "Monkey Fight" in which players fight each other in manic brawls. The latter two modes, Monkey Race and Monkey Fight, can be played via wireless connection with up to four players locally.

It was originally released on March 3, 2011 in Japan. It was later released as a launch title on March 25, March 27 and March 31 of the same year in Europe, North America and Australia, respectively. Sega has also released the game as the downloadable title for the Nintendo eShop in Europe and North America on April 3, 2014.

== Reception ==
Reception

Aggregate score
Aggregator	Score
Metacritic	55/100

Review scores
Publication	Score
Eurogamer	4/10
Game Informer	6/10
GameSpot	5/10
GamesRadar+	3/5
IGN	7.5/10
Nintendo Life	8/10
Nintendo World Report	3/10
Pocket Gamer	2.5/5
VideoGamer.com	5/10

Super Monkey Ball 3D received "mixed or average" reviews, according to review aggregator website Metacritic. Audrey Drake of IGN gave the game 7.5/10, praising the gameplay and story, but she criticized Monkey Race for being a "rip-off of Mario Kart with clunky controls", and Monkey Fight for "being a rip-off of Super Smash Bros. with clunky controls". Chris Schilling of Eurogamer gave the game a 4/10.
