= Super Monkey Ball: Step & Roll =

2010 video game

- Developer: Sega CS1 R&D
- Publisher: Sega
- Director: Jun Tokuhara
- Producer: Yasuhito Baba
- Composers: Tomoya Ohtani; Mariko Nanba
- Series: Super Monkey Ball
- Platform: Wii
- Release: NA: February 9, 2010; AU: February 11, 2010; EU: February 12, 2010; JP: February 25, 2010
- Genre: Platform
- Modes: Single player, Multiplayer

Super Monkey Ball: Step & Roll (Note: Known in Japan as Super Monkey Ball: Athletic (Japanese: スーパーモンキーボール アスレチック, Hepburn: Sūpā Monkī Bōru Asurechikku)) is a 2010 platform video game developed and published by Sega. Part of the Super Monkey Ball series, it was released in February 2010 worldwide for the Wii.

== Gameplay and development ==
Like the previous games, players must guide the ball to the goal in one minute without losing a life. Players are given four lives to begin with. There are six worlds, with the addition of one secret world which can be accessed by completing the other six worlds. Players can use the Wii Balance Board and shift their bodies to control the monkey ball. The new control scheme was an effort by developer Yasuhito Baba "to find a new way for players to experience Super Monkey Ball in order to increase the 'party feel' of the title". The game features 21 minigames which provide different scenarios for players to overcome. The minigames were developed for players to play with three Wii Remotes and one player with the Wii Balance Board; they were designed so that players battle against each other in asymmetric multiplayer.

== Reception ==
Reception

Aggregate score
Aggregator	Score
Metacritic	59/100

Review scores
Publication	Score
Eurogamer	3/5
Game Informer	6/10
GameSpot	5.5/10
IGN	7.8/10
Nintendo Power	5.5/10

The game received mixed reviews from reviewers. Craig Harris from IGN praised the game for its tight and natural controls using the Wii Remote, saying that "you're really controlling the tilt of the environment, not the momentum of the ball". He also praises the increased simplicity in the game with the lack of storyline, boss battles or jumping mechanic to slow it down. Laura Parker from GameSpot criticized the usage of the Wii Balance Board in the game, saying that the controls with the board are too sensitive. She notes that the usage of the board is more suited to the minigames than the main game. Martin Kitts from Computer and Video Games said that the game added nothing new from the previous games in the Super Monkey Ball series. Both he and Harris criticize the camera controlling; Kitts says that the camera doesn't switch angles when the player does or when it's necessary. Wiiloveit.com enjoyed the "user-friendly" package, and commented that the Balance Board can be "very rewarding" if you stick with it. Praise was also given to the Achievement system, the "fantastic" music, and the new Marathon Mode. Negative comments were mostly attributed towards the stage design; despite what was stated on the back of the box for the game, the stages were "hardly mind-blowing" and showed "little ingenuity". Steve Thomason of Nintendo Power was very critical of the game, commenting that the Balance Board-centric control scheme "simply doesn't work".
