= Super Monkey Ball 2 =

2002 video game

- North American cover art
- Developer: Amusement Vision
- Publisher: Sega
- Director: Toshihiro Nagoshi
- Producer: Toshihiro Nagoshi
- Designers: Yukinobu Arikawa; Hiroyuki Sakamoto
- Programmer: Hisashi Endo
- Artist: Mika Kojima
- Composers: Hidenori Shoji; Haruyoshi Tomita; Ryuji Iuchi
- Series: Super Monkey Ball
- Platform: GameCube
- Release: NA: August 26, 2002; JP: November 21, 2002; EU: March 14, 2003; AU: March 16, 2003
- Genres: Platform, party
- Modes: Single-player, multiplayer

Super Monkey Ball 2 (Note: Japanese: スーパーモンキーボール2, Hepburn: Sūpā Monkī Bōru Tsū) is a 2002 platform video game developed by Amusement Vision and published by Sega for the GameCube. It is the second installment in the Super Monkey Ball series, and the first installment to have a storyline and to be exclusively released on a home console.

Super Monkey Ball 2's stages were remade as a part of Super Monkey Ball Banana Mania.

== Gameplay ==
Super Monkey Ball 2 continues its predecessor's core Marble Madness-style gameplay. The player controls a monkey running in a ball with the joystick through maze-like stages with obstacles to dodge, which have to be completed under a time limit without the monkey falling off platform ledges. As the game progresses, there are more paths that loop, spin and corkscrew, and levels that move horizontally, vertically and 360-degrees. The sequel has a more spiked difficulty curve as a result of new design choices. Looped paths occasionally have obstacles and corkscrewed paths within them and some rotating stages have pillars popping out of holes. Another addition is switches scattered throughout that fast-forward, rewind, play and stop platforms while rolled over onto them, making the sequel more focused on strategy and puzzle-solving.

Unlike the first entry, Super Monkey Ball 2 has a single-player Story Mode grouping levels by ten. Dr. Bad-Boon is an evil scientist who steals all of the bananas from Monkey Island, putting four protagonists, AiAi, MeeMee, GonGon and Baby into action to chase him through booby-trapped stages he has set up. The story takes place over 100 levels split between ten worlds with animated cutscenes that play in between each. The player is given an infinite number of lives and can complete each world's ten stages in any order.

Screenshot of Super Monkey Ball 2, showing the player's head-up display and rolling mechanic. Unlike its predecessor, Super Monkey Ball 2 features widescreen support.

Challenge mode allows up to four players and plays like the main mode of the original Super Monkey Ball. There are three difficulty levels: Beginner, Advanced and Expert, consisting of 10, 30 and 50 floors each. Players navigate each set in order with a limited number of lives and continues. Beginner Extra, Advanced Extra and Expert Extra floors are unlocked when each respective difficulty level is completed without a single continue. There are ten extra stages in each difficulty. A hidden set of ten Master floors can be unlocked through playing the Expert Extra floors without using a continue. At this point, the player will be able to select this difficulty as if it were a normal mode. If a player completes all ten Master stages without using a continue, they will go to the Master Extra stages.

=== Multiplayer ===
There are 12 multiplayer mini-games, six of them reprisals from the predecessor with more gameplay styles and level types: Monkey Race, Monkey Fight, Monkey Target, Monkey Billiards, Monkey Bowling and Monkey Golf. Monkey Golf rejects the mini-golf courses of the first game for larger environments standard of regular golf, with terrain and wind affecting the power and trajectory of a shot, and the ability to drive and chip.

Monkey Race allows players to race up to eight computer opponents, larger than the previous game's three, and has new weapons such as the Hunter Missile which shoots several rockets at a time. Having only three arenas, Monkey Fight introduces crumbling fighting rings, the ability to charge a fight, and a sudden death mode. Monkey Billiards has Japanese 9 ball and Rotation as new gameplay modes, as well as a few more camera angle options.

Monkey Bowling contains a Special Mode in addition to the typical game present in the first. It has ten lanes that feature non-linear paths, such as zig-zag and concave, and moving parts. The monkeys also differ in attributes, such as GonGon being the best with speed and Baby better at maneuverability. Like the first game's mode, Monkey Target has the player controlling a gliding monkey to land on a target while avoiding falling into the water. However, it differs in how items are collected; instead of receiving them from bananas, which are now only points, they are now in the middle of the air to be collected on the monkey's trajectory. Formation flying, where the direction of up to five monkeys can be controlled simultaneously, and a split-screen feature of up to four players are additions.

The other six mini-games, Monkey Tennis, Monkey Baseball, Monkey Soccer, Monkey Boat, Monkey Shot and Monkey Dogfight, are introduced to the series. Some of these are replicas of Sega's Virtua franchises, such as Virtua Striker (1995–2004), Virtua Cop (1994–2003), and Virtua Tennis (1999–2012). In Monkey Baseball, the rolling monkey ball is pitched to the batter onto ramps that serve as bases and the home plate and lead into the outfield. Monkey Boat involves the racers kayaking down a river, with player's only control being the shoulder buttons to steer. Monkey Shot is a light gun shooter that also involves moving down a track, but to shoot at incoming enemies, missiles, and bosses while collecting items like upgrades to automatic guns. In Monkey Dogfight, the monkeys fly and shoot at each other.

== Reception ==
Reception

Aggregate score
Aggregator	Score
Metacritic	87/100

Review scores
Publication	Score
Eurogamer	8/10
Famitsu	31/40
G4	8/10
GamePro	9/10
GameRevolution	9/10
GameSpot	9/10
GameSpy	86/100
GamesRadar+	8.2/10
GameZone	9/10
IGN	9/10
Nintendo Power	4.9/5
Nintendo World Report	9.5/10

The game won the E3 2002 Game Critics Awards for Best Puzzle/Trivia/Parlor Game. GameSpot named it the best GameCube game of August 2002, and later declared it 2002's "Best Party Game on GameCube". It was nominated for GameSpot's annual "Best Sound on GameCube" and "Game of the Year on GameCube" awards, which went to Eternal Darkness: Sanity's Requiem and Metroid Prime, respectively.

Super Monkey Ball 2 received "generally favorable" reviews from critics, according to the review aggregation website Metacritic. IGN's Matt Casamassina praised the game for its core gameplay concepts, stating that it was "just as simple as the original, and also just as addictive... But where it's an entertaining single-player experience, it's a superb multiplayer one. All of the revamped mini-games are fantastic... this is one of the best multiplayer games for GCN, without a doubt and hands down."

Critics highlighted the level design, particularly the enhancements. Ryan Davis of GameSpot called it "bolder," Casamassina "revamped and fantastic," "more inspired and more extravagant." He noted their increased difficulty, where some tasks seem insurmountable initially. However, he also wrote they were addictive, where even skilled players who already defeated the harder stages would come back to figure out shortcuts and tricks to beat them in a shorter amount of time. He also positively noted the pacing, specifically the constant introduction of a new challenge every level. Mike Orlando of Nintendo World Report favorably discussed the levels' increased interactivity and strategy as a result of the introduction of switches, as well as the complexity of models built with otherwise simple polygons. Although finding a few stages gimmicky, particularly Launchers, he claimed the Labyrinth level was better than any stage in the first game.

The plot and cutscenes in the Story Mode were described as suitable to the exuberant nature of the overall experience, if "simple and at times ridiculous, weird and borderline disturbing". Orlando dismissed the story as having confusing concepts, such as the monkeys conjuring magical spells and GonGon chanting "Ei Ei Poo." However, he praised the Story Mode's inclusion as allowing less experienced players to enjoy a majority of the stages where they could not in the challenge mode.

Casamassina highlighted the limitless possibilities of play additions to the returning party mini-games provided. He reported a huge amount of depth in Monkey Bowling alone, to the point where it could have been its own game. He also praised the new mini-games, although argued they were not "as well conceived." Tennis was his most favorite of them for its combination of elements from Mario Tennis (2000) and Virtua Tennis, and the potential long replay value from the two-versus-two mode. Less favorably, he found Monkey Bassball too basic to be enjoyable for lengthy sessions, disliked Monkey Soccer's controls, and noted high difficulty in playing the otherwise fun Monkey Target and Monkey Boat Race. Orlando positively found Super Monkey Ball 2's Monkey Race more competitive than the first game's, coming from the higher number of opponents and less complicated tracks. He also enjoyed the formation flying and addition of a multiplayer mode in Monkey Target, as well as the Special Mode in Monkey Bowling for adding replay value. He also enjoyed Monkey Golf, although was confused by the wind and power shot statistics. Monkey Boat Race was noted by Orlando and Casamassina for its learning curve when it came to paddling the boat, which they wrote was rewarding.

Critics praised the use of animated assets in the backgrounds, such as volcanos, lava flows, clock gears and space stations, solving the first game's issues of drab, empty environments. They also appreciated the use of particle and lighting effects, such as sparks when a ball hits the ground and Volcanic Magma's flying embers.

The similarity between the first and second games' upbeat techno music, voice clips and sound effects were noted. However, Orlando highlighted the increased variety and depth to the soundtrack, and particularly enjoyed the music of the multiplayer modes.

By July 2006, Super Monkey Ball 2 had sold 760,000 copies and earned $22 million in the United States. Next Generation ranked it as the 80th highest-selling game launched for the PlayStation 2, Xbox or GameCube between January 2000 and July 2006 in that country. Combined sales of games in the Super Monkey Ball series released between those dates reached 1.1 million units in the United States by July 2006. The game sold well enough to warrant a GameCube Player's Choice budget re-release game.

== Legacy and impact ==
A 2002 study recognized Super Monkey Ball 2 as one of several video games associated with improved performance in laparoscopic surgery. An extended study, performed over three years with 300 participants, found that surgeons who played Super Monkey Ball 2 and other video games for at least six minutes prior to operating performed better in a virtual surgery simulation than surgeons that did not play. Results include a significant drop in errors and an increase in speed and overall score. In response to these findings, Dr. James Rosser created a gaming area in the physician's lounge at Florida Hospital Celebration Health, saying "I want all the surgeons to warm-up and make sure they give Super Monkey Ball a chance."
