= Super Monkey Ball (video game) =

2001 video game

- North American box art
- Developer: Amusement Vision
- Publisher: Sega
- Director: Toshihiro Nagoshi
- Producer: Toshihiro Nagoshi
- Designers: Yukinobu Arikawa; Hiroyuki Sakamoto
- Programmer: Hisashi Endo
- Artist: Mika Kojima
- Composers: Hidenori Shoji; Sakae Osumi; Haruyoshi Tomita
- Series: Super Monkey Ball
- Platforms: Arcade; GameCube
- Release: Arcade (Monkey Ball): JP: May 2001; GameCube (Super Monkey Ball): JP: September 14, 2001; NA: November 18, 2001; EU: May 3, 2002; AU: May 17, 2002
- Genres: Platform, party
- Modes: Single-player, multiplayer
- Arcade system: Sega NAOMI

Super Monkey Ball (Note: Japanese: スーパーモンキーボール, Hepburn: Sūpā Monkī Bōru) is a 2001 video game developed by Amusement Vision and published by Sega. The game debuted in Japan at the 2001 Amusement Operators Union trade show as Monkey Ball, (Note: Monkey Ball (Japanese: モンキーボール, Hepburn: Monkī Bōru)) an arcade cabinet running on Sega's NAOMI hardware and controlled with a distinctive banana-shaped analog stick. Due to the discontinuation of Sega's Dreamcast home console and the company's subsequent restructuring, an enhanced port dubbed Super Monkey Ball was released as a launch title for the GameCube in late 2001, garnering interest as Sega's first game published for a Nintendo home console.

Conceived by Amusement Vision head Toshihiro Nagoshi, Super Monkey Ball involves guiding a transparent ball through many levels, the ball containing one of four monkeys—AiAi, MeeMee, Baby, and GonGon—across a series of maze-like platforms. The player must reach the goal without falling off or letting the timer reach zero to advance to the next stage. There are also several multiplayer modes: independent minigames as well as extensions of the main single-player game.

Super Monkey Ball received highly positive reviews from critics, who praised the simplicity and subtle depth of its control scheme as well as the new multiplayer modes not present in its arcade counterpart, although some felt its presentation was lacking. The game was commercially successful and remained one of Sega's best-sellers in the United States for much of 2002, eventually spawning a direct sequel, Super Monkey Ball 2 (2002), and a broader Super Monkey Ball franchise. Super Monkey Ball's stages were remade as a part of Super Monkey Ball Banana Mania (2021).

== Gameplay ==
Super Monkey Ball has three game modes: main game, party games, and mini-games. The mini-games are unavailable at first, and must be unlocked by earning 2,500 "play points" through playing the main game in single-player mode.

=== Main game ===
The player about to start a stage during the main game

Reminiscent of Marble Madness and Labyrinth, the objective of the main game is to guide one of four playable monkeys (AiAi, MeeMee, Baby, and GonGon) encased in a transparent ball across a suspended series of platforms and through a goal. By moving the analog stick, the player tilts the entire set of platforms that make up a level, called a floor, and the ball rolls accordingly. If the ball falls off a floor (an event dubbed a fall out) or the in-game timer reaches zero, the player loses one of their three lives. The speed, in miles per hour, at which the ball is moving is displayed in the corner of the screen. Pausing the game and selecting the "View Stage" option allows one to rotate the camera around and examine the floor. A replay is presented after a floor's goal has been reached; replays can be saved to a memory card and viewed at whim. Every second remaining on the timer when a floor is completed adds 100 points to the player's score. Collectible bananas found throughout the game are also worth 100 points, while multipliers increasing the player's score by a factor of two or four are activated when a floor is finished in under half the allotted time or via a warp gate. The player receives an extra life for every 100 bananas collected.

The main game features three difficulty levels—Beginner, Advanced, and Expert, consisting of 10, 30, and 50 floors each—as well as three modes—Normal, Practice, and Competition. Normal mode allows one to four players to take turns progressing through the arcade Monkey Ball, whereas competition mode involves two to four player simultaneous split screen races across a selection of floors. In practice mode, any floor already played in normal mode can be repeated indefinitely with no penalties for failure. In normal mode, the player experiences a game over when they have lost all of their lives, but is allowed five opportunities to continue; eventually, unlimited "continues" can be unlocked. Beginner Extra, Advanced Extra and Expert Extra floors are unlocked when each respective difficulty level is completed without losing a single life (or without using a continue in Expert)—and a hidden set of Master floors can be unlocked through playing the Extra floors without using a continue.

=== Party games ===
The following party games are available:

- Monkey Race: One to four players simultaneously race across six courses divided into three difficulty levels. Steering is handled with the analog stick, while the A button is used to activate items (if enabled) that can be used to produce an increase in speed or to adversely affect opponents. A Time Attack mode involves the careful use of three available speed items to achieve faster times.
- Monkey Fight: One to four players simultaneously engage in combat by rolling in any direction with the analog stick and using the A button to punch opponents with a boxing glove attached to their monkey's ball. Points are awarded for knocking opponents off one of the three available arenas, with more points being awarded when the player currently in the lead is knocked off. The player with the most points is declared the winner of a round when the in-game timer reaches zero. Items can be used to extend the reach, size, and strength of one's boxing glove.
- Monkey Target: One to four players take turns rolling their monkey down a ramp, launching it into the sky. The monkey's ball opens on command to resemble a pair of wings, allowing it to fly. The monkey's trajectory is manipulated with the analog stick. Wind direction and strength, altitude, and speed (in addition to random hazards selected by an optional "Wheel of Danger" feature before each flight) impact the player's ability to land the monkey on one of several dartboard-like targets in the middle of the ocean. Bananas collected while airborne enable the use of items in later rounds that can eliminate wind resistance, control the ball's roll, multiply the player's score, or ensure a sticky landing.

=== Mini-games ===
The mini-games are based on real sporting activities, but with the player's ball containing their monkey. The following mini-games are available, once unlocked through the earning of play points:

- Monkey Billiards: One to two players take turns competing in a game of nine-ball. The analog stick determines the direction of each shot and the A button is used to stop the moving gauge that determines shot speed. A tournament mode featuring four AI challengers is also available.
- Monkey Bowling: One to four players take turns competing in a game of ten-pin bowling. The analog stick is used to move left and right, the A button sets the direction and strength for each throw, and the L or R buttons apply spin to the ball. A challenge mode featuring 10 pin arrangements and permitting only 12 throws is also available.
- Monkey Golf: One to four players take turns competing across 18 holes in a game of golf with stroke play scoring, or two players compete using match play scoring. The direction and general rolling distance of each shot is arranged with the analog stick, and the shot's strength is set by the A button.

== Development ==
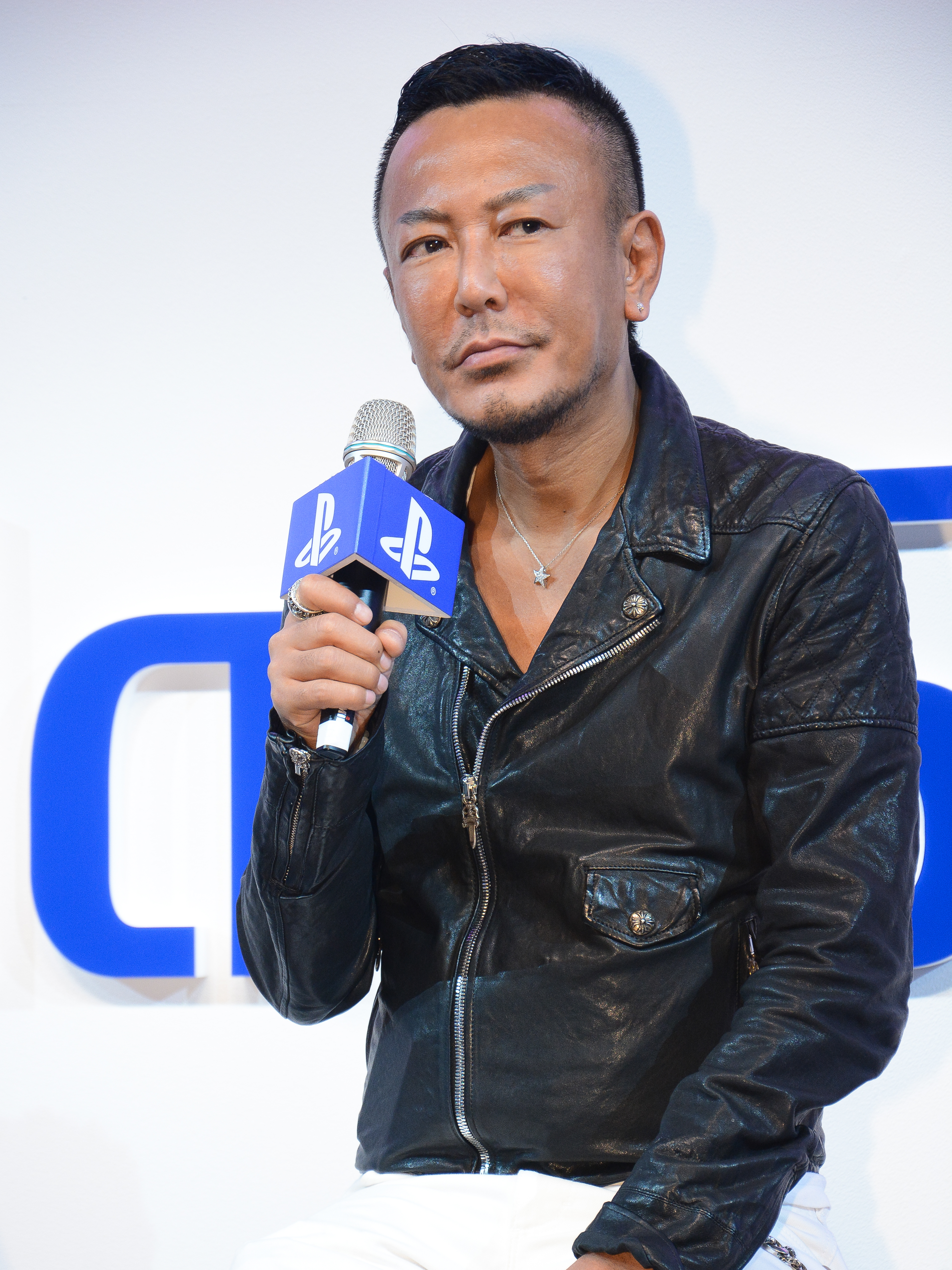
Director and producer Toshihiro Nagoshi in 2014

Super Monkey Ball was developed by Amusement Vision, a branch of the Japanese video game publisher Sega that was created in 2000 and composed of about fifty people. Amusement Vision president Toshihiro Nagoshi, who had previously worked under Sega AM2's Yu Suzuki and been credited as the creator of the arcade titles Daytona USA and Virtua Striker, devised the concept of rolling spheres through mazes based on his desire to create a game that was instantly possible to understand and play, as a contrast to increasingly complex games at Japanese arcades at the time. Prototypes involving a plain ball or a ball with an illustration were considered visually unappealing due to difficulties in perceiving its movement, so after a series of revisions monkey characters previously created by an Amusement Vision designer named Mika Kojima were placed inside the ball, with their appearance being altered to include their "distinctive" ears. Intended to feature a "cute" aesthetic and accurate physics engine, the game debuted at the 2001 Amusement Operator Union trade show as Monkey Ball, a single-player arcade cabinet controlled with a distinctive banana-shaped analog stick.

Japanese arcade flyer

In early 2001, Sega announced that it was discontinuing its Dreamcast home console and restructuring itself into a "platform-agnostic" third-party publisher. As a result, an enhanced version of Monkey Ball dubbed Super Monkey Ball was released for the GameCube as a launch game in Japan on September 14, 2001 and North America on November 18. The GameCube version was demonstrated to the public at E3 in May and at Nintendo's Space World show in August; Sega confirmed that it would arrive in time for the GameCube's launch at the June 2001 World Hobby Fair. As the first game Sega published for a Nintendo home console, Super Monkey Ball was considered a milestone for the company. Although Monkey Ball had been developed for Sega's NAOMI arcade board, which shared technology with the Dreamcast and was optimized to ensure games could be easily ported between the two platforms, Nagoshi commented that Nintendo's young demographic made the GameCube an even more fitting console for the title. According to Nagoshi, Amusement Vision staff felt more comfortable with the GameCube than Sega's own hardware and this ease of development contributed to their decision to focus on the system over the PlayStation 2 or Xbox; he also joked that Nintendo was the only hardware manufacturer the staff did not "hate". Out of a team composed of ten to twenty individuals, it took four Amusement Vision employees between several weeks and two months to port Monkey Ball to the GameCube. Its graphics were enhanced with new background details as well as reflections and particle effects. Moreover, the developers spent an additional six months incorporating six extra modes into the game, with an emphasis on multiplayer competition and the introduction of GonGon as a fourth playable character.

The bananas in the game display the Dole Food Company logo, but this was removed in Super Monkey Ball Deluxe due to a licensing dispute. A theme song called "Ei Ei Puh!", which was arranged by Cheru Watanabe and featured vocals by Yu Abiru, was created for the Japanese version of Super Monkey Ball but removed from its U.S. release. Tokyo-based voice actor Brian Matt provided the game's narration, albeit uncredited.

== Reception ==
Reception

Aggregate scores
Aggregator	Score
GameRankings	89%
Metacritic	87/100

Review scores
Publication	Score
Edge	9/10
Famitsu	8/10, 8/10, 8/10, 8/10 (Note: Each review is a different rating provided by a different reviewer for the publication.)
GamePro	4.5/5
GameSpot	8.8/10
GameSpy	91/100
IGN	8.3/10
Nintendo Power	5/5, 5/5, 5/5, 5/5, 5/5
N-Sider	9/10, 9/10, 8/10, 9/10
The Japan Times	Favorable

=== Sales ===
Super Monkey Ball was commercially successful upon release and remained one of Sega's best-selling titles in the United States through much of 2002. The game's North American sales were strong in 2001, in addition to a further 105,000 units sold through August 2002. At the GameCube's United Kingdom launch, Super Monkey Ball was among the four best-selling games for the system, with those titles occupying positions two through five on the all-formats chart.

While it sold well in all major territories, Nagoshi was disappointed by the game's performance in Japan, where he had expected it would be most successful; weak GameCube launch sales were cited as negatively impacting its performance in the country. The game sold 72,631 units in Japan.

=== Critical reception ===
Super Monkey Ball received "generally favorable" reviews, with aggregated scores of 87/100 on Metacritic and 88.7% on GameRankings, some journalists considered Super Monkey Ball the highlight of the GameCube's launch lineup. Edge praised the main game as "absorb[ing]" due to its high level of difficulty, noting that the trial and error required to complete challenging levels forces one to learn the nuances of its "reductive control system" and eventually enables the player to perform seemingly impossible tasks with increasing ease: "Once a level falls, the mysticism around it vanishes. It's beatable; it's an afterthought on the route to your next impossible hurdle." Ben Turner (GameSpy) commented on the "excellent progression of difficulty" engendered by three distinct difficulty modes and thoughtful stage design, expounding "most levels introduce some new idea or concept to the game" and "every single level played adds to your skill." Matt Casamassina (IGN) commended the "great level variation", with "well created mazes and puzzles that must be completed using a combination of physics calculations, careful planning and a huge helping of patience." Turner complimented the frequent introduction of incentives to keep playing such as additional continues and hidden levels, adding that a high "ceiling of mastery" enhanced the game's longevity through a "simple but well conceived" scoring system and the ability to test strategies in practice mode. Edge and Casamassina thought similarly, with the latter stating "there are shortcuts that can be carved out by the crafty player, physics to be considered when navigating and more." Tim Knowles (N-Sider) pointed out that "the latter levels in the game get extremely difficult and you will often get frustrated", while Casamassina felt "it may be a little too difficult for the casual gamer." However, Mark Medina (N-Sider) called the learning curve "perfectly spot on": "Any falling off the platforms feels entirely your fault and at the same time, you always get the sense that you're just that little bit closer to that elusive goal." Edge and Jason Nuyens and Will Stevenson (N-Sider) agreed with this sentiment, with the latter two emphasizing the addictive quality of the gameplay. On a technical note, Four-Eyed Dragon (GamePro) faulted the camera system, which "can get out of position, making it hard to maneuver in tight spots." Steven L. Kent (The Japan Times) described the game as "a test of nerve" requiring "advanced eye–hand coordination." Turner reflected on the game's ability to evoke feelings of "nervous excitement", "intensity", and "electrifying, stomach-wrenching fear": "It's a thrilling feeling to be winding down a paper-thin path with ten seconds on the clock, hoping against hope that you can keep your balance for just a few more seconds and make it to the goal before time expires." Edge opined that the game is "defined" by "unrefined and angular" emotions:

Every second brings another jagged spike of highrise elation or freefall despair, and that's what makes the game so superb ... when you finally beat a maze on your 15th try, on the last life of your last continue, it's all worth it. If that experience could be distilled into a single word, it would be euphoria; reducing Super Monkey Ball to one word is simpler. It's genius.

On the party and mini games, Kent asserted "All of the activities ... were designed with an unerring eye for quality", Edge contended "none are half-assed throwaway rewards", and Nintendo Power remarked "each one is a fully realized activity that you could play for hours." Ricardo Torres (GameSpot) called Monkey Race "a solid little racer", and Casamassina recounted it felt "polished and finely tuned." Stevenson "loved Monkey Fight", while Casamassina and Kent highlighted the use of a crown to identify the player currently in the lead as encouraging "players to gang up on each other." Casamassina hailed Monkey Fight as "a thing of beauty", but Turner dismissed it as "a dud, as it's too much frantic button smacking and not enough skill or thought." Monkey Target, lauded by Kent as the "most addictive interactive activity of 2001" and considered "the most complex" of the party games by Turner, was complimented by Casamassina for its "simple and brilliantly intuitive" control scheme and "careful science of when to use an item and when to forgo it." Nintendo Power and Medina, respectively, described Monkey Billiards as "a full-blown pool game" and "a very fun alternative to the real game"; Casamassina applauded its "ultra-realistic physics engine that perfectly mimics how pool balls would react ... it all works just as good if not better than any pool simulation available to home consoles." Casamassina was further impressed by the physics of Monkey Bowling, elaborating that "when the pins break apart one would swear it's the real deal", but Turner criticized its physics as "slightly wonky". Medina singled out Monkey Bowling's "nailbiting" challenge mode as a personal favorite, while Nintendo Power considered Monkey Bowling "as good as tenpin gets" and Kent wrote it "is one of the most robust bowling simulations I have ever played." Finally, Four-Eyed Dragon conveyed that Monkey Golf provided "a humongous challenge" with "crazy, lopsided miniature golf course[s]", while Kent called it an "absolutely infuriating ... test [of] your aim and your logic."

Although "not extremely complex or technically impressive in the way that many other launch titles strive to be" Turner believed the graphics were "extremely well-realized and perfectly suited to the game." According to Torres, "while the four selectable monkey models and the various levels are simple in design, they are generously modeled with well-textured and shaded polygons and have a very rich look." Four-Eyed Dragon spoke highly of the "hilarious" monkey animations, "sharp reflections and cool water effects". Likewise, Casamassina enjoyed the dances performed by the monkeys after winning a match and cited the water effects as "particularly incredible". The game was described by Turner as "colorful" and "crisp" and by Torres as "cartoony" and "clean". Edge likened the game's aesthetic to Sega's Sonic the Hedgehog series: "Every surface is bright and solid and shiny, every aspect impeccably presented." Casamassina, Turner, and Torres all praised the consistent frame rate, with Casamassina emphasizing "it truly, always runs at a full 60 frames per second." However, Four-Eyed Dragon noted the visuals were "not greatly detailed" and Casamassina observed "there isn't much geometry being drawn at any single point in the title and the backgrounds are often barren, whether it be for power or stylistic purposes." Moreover, Casamassina was disappointed that the three difficulty modes reused level themes and by the absence of progressive scan support. Torres regarded the game's sound as "good" but "probably [its] weakest aspect", calling the music "catchy" but finding the monkey noises repetitive and the remaining sound effects "unspectacular." Conversely, Blue-Eyed Dragon was favorable to the "boisterously entertaining monkey sounds that can be heard once a chimp hits a wall or falls off a ledge" as well as the "eclectic mix of instrumental tunes". Turner "thought the music ... set the mood perfectly, but some may find it annoying".

Kent named Super Monkey Ball "the best party game of all time." Torres opined that the game "makes a strong case for the power of simple yet incredibly addictive gameplay." Knowles stated it represented "Sega at its pure best." Famitsu "liked the mini-games in addition to the regular modes." Nintendo Power hailed the game as "one of the ultimate party games" and "the best in serious gaming, too." Turner declared it "that rarity of rarities: a perfectly-realized launch title", with a "bounty of extras" that set "a new standard for arcade to home conversions". According to Medina, "probably the greatest thing about this game is that it's so unassuming, in that you are genuinely very surprised at its extremely high quality."

Super Monkey Ball was a runner-up for GameSpot's annual "Best GameCube Game" award, which went to Super Smash Bros. Melee.

== Legacy ==
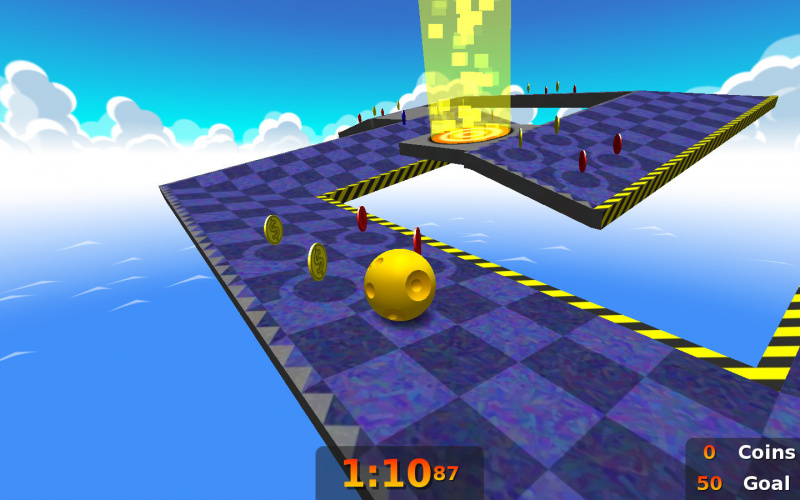
Neverball, a freely licensed game, was inspired by Super Monkey Ball.

The success of the game spawned a franchise, with 16 sequels or spin-offs released to date. Due to its complex physics engine and abundance of possible shortcuts, Super Monkey Ball has been popular with professional speedrunners. A 2006 study conducted by the Beth Israel Medical Center found that surgeons who played the game for 20 minutes prior to performing a surgical drill finished slightly faster and made fewer mistakes. Super Monkey Ball inspired Neverball, a free and open source game for Microsoft Windows, OS X, Linux, Dreamcast, and iOS. The 2020 battle royale game Fall Guys: Ultimate Knockout has been described as "Super Monkey Ball for the Fortnite generation" by Tom Wiggins of Stuff magazine.

In 2006, Nintendo Power ranked it the 38th best game available on Nintendo platforms, commenting "who knew that such cute characters with cinnamon roll ears could be the source of so much tension (when the clock is ticking) and so much relief (when they finally break the ribbon)?" In February 2009, Official Nintendo Magazine placed the game 90th on a list of the best Nintendo games, noting that "Along with the bum-clenchingly tricky puzzle stages, you get some great mini-games in this brilliant arcade game." In March 2009, Edge ranked the game #39 on its list of "The 100 Best Games To Play Today", stating "Seeing its sturdy physics model being used to perform incredible acrobatic feats shows just how finely honed it is." Writing in 1001 Video Games You Must Play Before You Die, Christian Donlan described Super Monkey Ball as "one of Sega's grade-A triumphs."
