= List of Yakuza media =

Like a Dragon, formerly titled Yakuza outside Japan, is a role playing video game series developed by Ryu Ga Gotoku and published by Sega. The series debuted in 2005 with the release of Yakuza on PlayStation 2. By 2022, the series sold over 19 million copies.

The majority games take place in the fictional red light district of Kamurocho, based on Kabukichō, Tokyo. Like a Dragon titles are usually released originally in Japan, before being released in the west a year later; the series is largely exclusive to the PlayStation series of consoles, and have made the transition to multiplatform releases in the eighth generation of video game consoles.

Related books, dramatizations and music albums have also been released.

== Video games ==
=== Main series ===
Game	Details
Yakuza Original release date(s): JP: December 8, 2005; NA: September 5, 2006; EU: September 15, 2006	Release years by system: 2005—PlayStation 2
Yakuza Original release date(s): JP: December 8, 2005; NA: September 5, 2006; EU: September 15, 2006	Notes: Worldwide sales: 1 million+ (Note: Sales figures may include remastered version); Originally released as Ryū ga Gotoku (Japanese: 龍が如く, lit. "Like a Dragon") in Japan; Rereleased in the remastered compilation Yakuza 1 + 2 HD in 2012
Yakuza 2 Original release date(s): JP: December 7, 2006; NA: September 9, 2008; EU: September 19, 2008; AU: September 25, 2008	Release years by system: 2006—PlayStation 2
Yakuza 2 Original release date(s): JP: December 7, 2006; NA: September 9, 2008; EU: September 19, 2008; AU: September 25, 2008	Notes: Worldwide sales: 870,000+ (Note: 830,000 units sold in Japan.; 40,000 units sold in North America); Originally released as Ryū ga Gotoku 2 (Japanese: 龍が如く 2, lit. "Like a Dragon 2") in Japan; Rereleased in the remastered compilation Yakuza 1 + 2 HD in 2012
Yakuza 3 Original release date(s): JP: February 26, 2009; NA: March 9, 2010; EU: March 12, 2010; AU: March 11, 2010	Release years by system: 2009—PlayStation 3
Yakuza 3 Original release date(s): JP: February 26, 2009; NA: March 9, 2010; EU: March 12, 2010; AU: March 11, 2010	Notes: Worldwide sales: 800,000; Originally released as Ryū ga Gotoku 3 (Japanese: 龍が如く3, lit. "Like a Dragon 3") in Japan; Rereleased in the remastered compilation The Yakuza Remastered Collection in 2020
Yakuza 4 Original release date(s): JP: March 18, 2010; NA: March 15, 2011; EU: March 18, 2011	Release years by system: 2010—PlayStation 3
Yakuza 4 Original release date(s): JP: March 18, 2010; NA: March 15, 2011; EU: March 18, 2011	Notes: Worldwide sales: 500,000+; Originally released as Ryū ga Gotoku 4: Densetsu wo Tsugumono (Japanese: 龍が如く4 伝説を継ぐもの, lit. "Like a Dragon 4: Successor of the Legend") in Japan; Rereleased in the remastered compilation The Yakuza Remastered Collection in 2020
Yakuza 5 Original release date(s): JP: December 5, 2012; WW: December 18, 2015	Release years by system: 2012—PlayStation 3
Yakuza 5 Original release date(s): JP: December 5, 2012; WW: December 18, 2015	Notes: Worldwide sales: 700,000+; Originally released as Ryū ga Gotoku 5: Yume, Kanaeshi Mono (Japanese: 龍が如く5 夢、叶えし者, lit. "Like a Dragon 5: Fulfiller of Dreams") in Japan; Rereleased in the remastered compilation The Yakuza Remastered Collection in 2020
Yakuza 0 Original release date(s): JP: March 12, 2015; WW: January 24, 2017	Release years by system: 2015—PlayStation 3 (JP Only), PlayStation 4 2018—Microsoft Windows 2020—Xbox One 2021—Amazon Luna 2025-(Director’s Cut) Nintendo Switch 2, Microsoft Windows, PlayStation 5, Xbox Series X/S
Yakuza 0 Original release date(s): JP: March 12, 2015; WW: January 24, 2017	Notes: Worldwide sales: 2,000,000+; Originally released as Ryū ga Gotoku Zero: Chikai no Basho (Japanese: 龍が如く0 誓いの場所, Like a Dragon 0: The Place of Oath) in Japan
Yakuza 6: The Song of Life Original release date(s): JP: December 18, 2016; WW: April 17, 2018	Release years by system: 2016—PlayStation 4 2021—Microsoft Windows, Xbox One
Yakuza 6: The Song of Life Original release date(s): JP: December 18, 2016; WW: April 17, 2018	Notes: Worldwide sales: 1 million~; Originally released as Ryū ga Gotoku 6: Inochi no Uta (Japanese: 龍が如く6 命の詩, Like a Dragon 6: Poem of Life) in Japan
Yakuza: Like a Dragon Original release date(s): JP: January 16, 2020; WW: November 10, 2020	Release years by system: 2020—PlayStation 4, Microsoft Windows, Xbox One, Xbox Series X/S 2021—PlayStation 5
Yakuza: Like a Dragon Original release date(s): JP: January 16, 2020; WW: November 10, 2020	Notes: Worldwide sales: 3,500,000+; Originally released as Ryū ga Gotoku 7: Hikari to Yami no Yukue (Japanese: 龍が如く7 光と闇の行方, Like a Dragon 7: Whereabouts of Light and Darkness)
Like a Dragon: Infinite Wealth Original release date(s): WW: January 26, 2024	Release years by system: PlayStation 4, PlayStation 5, Microsoft Windows, Xbox One, Xbox Series X/S
Like a Dragon: Infinite Wealth Original release date(s): WW: January 26, 2024	Notes: Worldwide sales: 1,000,000+

=== Remasters ===
Game	Details
Ryū ga Gotoku 1&2 HD EDITION Original release date(s): JP: November 1, 2012	Release years by system: 2012—PlayStation 3 2013—Wii U
Ryū ga Gotoku 1&2 HD EDITION Original release date(s): JP: November 1, 2012	Notes: Released only in Japan; HD remasters of Yakuza and Yakuza 2
The Yakuza Remastered Collection Original release date(s): JP: August 9, 2018	Release years by system: 2018—PlayStation 4 (Yakuza 3) 2019–PlayStation 4 (Yakuza 4, Yakuza 5) 2021—Microsoft Windows, Xbox One (Yakuza 3, Yakuza 4, Yakuza 5)
The Yakuza Remastered Collection Original release date(s): JP: August 9, 2018	Notes: Compilation of Yakuza 3, Yakuza 4, and Yakuza 5 remastered titled The Yakuza Remastered Collection released physically for PlayStation 4 on February 11, 2020

=== Remakes ===
Game	Details
Yakuza Kiwami Original release date(s): JP: January 21, 2016; WW: August 29, 2017	Release years by system: 2016—PlayStation 3 (JP Only), PlayStation 4 2019—Microsoft Windows 2020—Xbox One 2022—Amazon Luna 2024—Nintendo Switch 2025-Nintendo Switch 2, PlayStation 5, Xbox Series X/S
Yakuza Kiwami Original release date(s): JP: January 21, 2016; WW: August 29, 2017	Notes: Worldwide sales: 1,500,000 (Note: 103,256 sold for PlayStation 4 in Japan.; 60,427 sold for PlayStation 3 in Japan.); Originally released as Ryū ga Gotoku: Kiwami (Japanese: 龍が如く 極, lit. "Like a Dragon: Extreme") in Japan; Remake of the original game
Yakuza Kiwami 2 Original release date(s): JP: December 7, 2017; WW: August 28, 2018	Release years by system: 2017—PlayStation 4 2019—Microsoft Windows 2020—Xbox One 2025-Nintendo Switch 2, PlayStation 5, Xbox Series X/S
Yakuza Kiwami 2 Original release date(s): JP: December 7, 2017; WW: August 28, 2018	Notes: Worldwide sales: 1,300,000; Originally released as Ryū ga Gotoku: Kiwami 2 (Japanese: 龍が如く 極 2, Like a Dragon: Extreme 2) in Japan; Remake of Yakuza 2
Yakuza Kiwami 3 Original release date(s): WW: February 12, 2026	Release years by system: Nintendo Switch 2, PlayStation 4, PlayStation 5, Windows, Xbox Series X/S
Yakuza Kiwami 3 Original release date(s): WW: February 12, 2026	Notes: Remake of the 2009 Japanese video game of the same name. Comes with Dark Ties, a spin-off title starring Yakuza 3 antagonist Yoshitaka Mine, taking place before the events of Yakuza 3.

=== Spin-offs ===
Game	Details
Ryū ga Gotoku Kenzan! Original release date(s): JP: March 6, 2008	Release years by system: PlayStation 3
Ryū ga Gotoku Kenzan! Original release date(s): JP: March 6, 2008	Notes: Japanese sales: 270,438; Released in Japan only
Kurohyō: Ryū ga Gotoku Shinshō Original release date(s): JP: September 22, 2010	Release years by system: PlayStation Portable
Kurohyō: Ryū ga Gotoku Shinshō Original release date(s): JP: September 22, 2010	Notes: Released in Japan only
Ryū ga Gotoku Mobile for GREE Original release date(s): JP: 2011	Release years by system: February 23, 2011 - Phones July 1, 2011 - iOS July 12, 2011 - Android
Ryū ga Gotoku Mobile for GREE Original release date(s): JP: 2011	Notes: Released in Japan only
Yakuza: Dead Souls Original release date(s): JP: June 9, 2011; NA: March 13, 2012; EU: March 16, 2012	Release years by system: PlayStation 3
Yakuza: Dead Souls Original release date(s): JP: June 9, 2011; NA: March 13, 2012; EU: March 16, 2012	Notes: Worldwide sales: 309,058
CR Ryū ga Gotoku Kenzan! Original release date(s): JP: October 18, 2011	Release years by system:
CR Ryū ga Gotoku Kenzan! Original release date(s): JP: October 18, 2011	Notes: A Ryū ga Gotoku Kenzan! themed slot machine game; Released in Japan only
Kurohyō 2: Ryū ga Gotoku Ashura-hen Original release date(s): JP: March 22, 2012	Release years by system: PlayStation Portable
Kurohyō 2: Ryū ga Gotoku Ashura-hen Original release date(s): JP: March 22, 2012	Notes: Released in Japan only; Direct sequel to Kurohyō: Ryū ga Gotoku Shinshō
Ryū ga Gotoku Kizuna Original release date(s): JP: March 26, 2012	Release years by system: Android, iOS
Ryū ga Gotoku Kizuna Original release date(s): JP: March 26, 2012	Notes: Released in Japan only
Ryū ga Gotoku Ishin! Original release date(s): JP: February 22, 2014	Release years by system: PlayStation 3, PlayStation 4
Ryū ga Gotoku Ishin! Original release date(s): JP: February 22, 2014	Notes: Japanese sales: ~400,000; Released in Japan only; Launch title for PlayStation 4 in Japan
Fist of the North Star: Lost Paradise Original release date(s): JP: March 8, 2018; WW: October 2, 2018	Release years by system: PlayStation 4
Fist of the North Star: Lost Paradise Original release date(s): JP: March 8, 2018; WW: October 2, 2018	Notes: Worldwide sales: 123,116; Crossover title with the Fist of the North Star manga series on the Yakuza 5 engine; Originally released as Hokuto ga Gotoku (Japanese: 北斗が如く, Like the Big Dipper) in Japan.
Ryū ga Gotoku Online Original release date(s): JP: November 21, 2018	Release years by system: Microsoft Windows, Android, iOS
Ryū ga Gotoku Online Original release date(s): JP: November 21, 2018	Notes: Released in Japan only
Judgment Original release date(s): JP: December 13, 2018; WW: June 25, 2019	Release years by system: 2018—PlayStation 4 2021—Google Stadia, Xbox Series S/X, PlayStation 5 2022—Microsoft Windows
Judgment Original release date(s): JP: December 13, 2018; WW: June 25, 2019	Notes: Worldwide sales: 1,000,000+
Streets of Kamurocho Original release date(s): WW: October 17, 2020	Release years by system: Microsoft Windows
Streets of Kamurocho Original release date(s): WW: October 17, 2020	Notes: Developed by Empty Clip Studios and only available from October 17–19, 2020; Beat 'em up minigame inspired by Streets of Rage
Lost Judgment Original release date(s): WW: September 24, 2021	Release years by system: 2021—Xbox One, Xbox Series S/X, PlayStation 4, PlayStation 5 2022—Microsoft Windows
Lost Judgment Original release date(s): WW: September 24, 2021	Notes: Worldwide sales: 2,000,000+; Direct sequel to Judgment
Like a Dragon: Ishin! Original release date(s): NA: February 21, 2023; JP: February 22, 2023	Release years by system: Xbox One, Xbox Series S/X, Windows, PlayStation 4, PlayStation 5
Like a Dragon: Ishin! Original release date(s): NA: February 21, 2023; JP: February 22, 2023	Notes: Remake of the 2014 Japanese video game of the same name
Like a Dragon Gaiden: The Man Who Erased His Name Original release date(s): WW: November 9, 2023	Release years by system: Xbox One, Xbox Series S/X, Windows, PlayStation 4, PlayStation 5
Like a Dragon Gaiden: The Man Who Erased His Name Original release date(s): WW: November 9, 2023	Notes: Side Story to Yakuza: Like a Dragon and Like a Dragon: Infinite Wealth
Like a Dragon: Pirate Yakuza in Hawaii Original release date(s): WW: February 21, 2025	Release years by system: Xbox One, Xbox Series S/X, Windows, PlayStation 4, PlayStation 5
Like a Dragon: Pirate Yakuza in Hawaii Original release date(s): WW: February 21, 2025	Notes: Sequel/Side Story to Like a Dragon: Infinite Wealth
Dark Ties Original release date(s): WW: February 12, 2026	Release years by system: Nintendo Switch 2, PlayStation 4, PlayStation 5, Windows, Xbox Series X/S
Dark Ties Original release date(s): WW: February 12, 2026	Notes: A spin-off title starring Yakuza 3 antagonist Yoshitaka Mine, taking place before the events of Yakuza 3. Comes with the remake of the 2009 Japanese video game of the same name.

== Other media ==
=== Books ===
Game	Details
Kamutai Magazine Kamutai Magazine (カムタイマガジン) Original release date(s): December 2005	Release years by system: 2005—First issue released for Yakuza 2006—Second issue released for Yakuza 2 2008—Third issue released for Kenzan 2009—Fourth issue released for Yakuza 3 2010—Fifth issue released for Yakuza 4, sixth issue released for Kurohyo 2012—Seventh issue released for Kurohyo 2 2015—Final issue released for Yakuza 0
Kamutai Magazine Kamutai Magazine (カムタイマガジン) Original release date(s): December 2005	Notes: Preorder bonus coinciding with the release of each respective game
Kurohyou: Ryu Ga Gotoku Shinsho Original release date(s): December 2010	Release years by system: 2010
Kurohyou: Ryu Ga Gotoku Shinsho Original release date(s): December 2010	Notes: This manga has 3 volumes.; The manga adaptation to the video game of the same name.

=== Dramatizations ===
Game	Details
Like a Dragon ~ Prologue ~ (龍が如く 〜序章〜, Ryū ga Gotoku ~ Joshō ~) Original release date(s): JP: March 24, 2006; EU: August 15, 2006	Release years by system: 2006—DVD
Like a Dragon ~ Prologue ~ (龍が如く 〜序章〜, Ryū ga Gotoku ~ Joshō ~) Original release date(s): JP: March 24, 2006; EU: August 15, 2006	Notes: A direct-to-video prequel to Yakuza
Ryū ga Gotoku Gekijōban Original release date(s): JP: March 3, 2007; NA: June 23, 2008	Release years by system: 2010—DVD
Ryū ga Gotoku Gekijōban Original release date(s): JP: March 3, 2007; NA: June 23, 2008	Notes: Based on Yakuza
Ryu Ga Gotoku Presents Kamuro-cho Radio Station (龍が如くPresents神室町RADIOSTATION) Original release date(s): JP: September 2008	Release years by system: 2008–Radio drama
Ryu Ga Gotoku Presents Kamuro-cho Radio Station (龍が如くPresents神室町RADIOSTATION) Original release date(s): JP: September 2008	Notes: Featuring several voice actors from the Like a Dragon series
Shin Kamuro-cho Radio Station (新・神室町RADIOSTATION) Original release date(s): JP: 2009	Release years by system: 2009–Downloadable podcast
Shin Kamuro-cho Radio Station (新・神室町RADIOSTATION) Original release date(s): JP: 2009	Notes: Second season of the radio drama
Kurohyo Ryu ga Gotoku Shinsho Original release date(s): JP: October 5, 2010	Release years by system: 2010–TBS television series
Kurohyo Ryu ga Gotoku Shinsho Original release date(s): JP: October 5, 2010	Notes: Based on the PlayStation Portable game of the same name
Kurohyo 2 Ryu ga Gotoku Ashura-hen Original release date(s): JP: April 8, 2012	Release years by system: 2012–TBS television series
Kurohyo 2 Ryu ga Gotoku Ashura-hen Original release date(s): JP: April 8, 2012	Notes: Based on the PlayStation Portable game of the same name
Like a Dragon: Yakuza Original release date(s): WW: October 25, 2024	Release years by system: 2024–Amazon Prime Video television series
Like a Dragon: Yakuza Original release date(s): WW: October 25, 2024	Notes: Based on Yakuza

== Music albums ==
Title	Release date	Length	Label	Source
Yakuza 0 (Side A)	March 11, 2015	02:09:33	Laced Records	
Yakuza 0 (Side B)	March 11, 2015	01:25:49	Laced Records	
Yakuza 1 & 2	January 25, 2007	02:20:35	SEGA	
Yakuza 3	February 26, 2009	01:15:05	Sega/Wave Master	
Yakuza 4 (Volume 1)	March 24, 2010	01:52:32	SEGA	
Yakuza 4 (Volume 2)	March 24, 2010	01:29:30	SEGA	
Yakuza 5 (Volume 1)	December 5, 2012	01:49:14 (Original); 01:48:45 (-Revised-)	SEGA	
Yakuza 5 (Volume 2)	December 5, 2012	02:34:24	SEGA	
Yakuza: Dead Souls (Volume 1)	June 8. 2011	52:58	Sega	
Yakuza: Dead Souls (Volume 2)	June 8. 2011	54:04	Sega	
Ryu ga Gotoku Ishin! (Volume 1)	February 26, 2014	02:25:00	SEGA	
Ryu ga Gotoku Ishin! (Volume 2)	February 26, 2014	02:14:50	SEGA	
Ryu ga Gotoku Kenzan!	March 5, 2008	1:13:26	Sega/Wave Master	
Yakuza Kiwami	June 6, 2016	01:38:48	SEGA	
Yakuza 6: The Song of Life	August 27, 2017	02:56:59	enterbrain	
Yakuza Kiwami & Yakuza Kiwami 2	December 7, 2017	02:39:02 (complete); 01:08:18 (original)	SEGA	
Yakuza: Like a Dragon	February 14, 2022	02:44:04	SEGA MUSIC	
Kurohyou: Ryu Ga Gotoku Shinsho	October 6, 2010	57:09	SEGA	
Kurohyou 2: Ryu Ga Gotoku Ashura-hen	May 2, 2012	35:31	Wave Master Entertainment	
Judgment	December 13, 2018	03:08:12	enterbrain	
Lost Judgment	September 24, 2021	03:57:26	ebten records, SEGA MUSIC	
Like a Dragon: Ishin! Complete Karaoke Songs	February 22, 2023	28:25		
Like a Dragon Gaiden: The Man Who Erased His Name ORIGINAL SOUND TRACK	December 6, 2023	02:38:01	Sega/Wave Master	
Like a Dragon: Infinite Wealth ORIGINAL SOUNDTRACK	March 6, 2024	05:55:20	WAVE MASTER ENTERTAINMENT	
Like a Dragon: Pirate Yakuza in Hawaii Original Soundtrack	February 21, 2025	03:43:24		
Yakuza Kiwami 3 / Dark Ties Original Soundtrack	February 12, 2026	4:20:10		
