= Akira Nishikiyama =

Fictional character from the Yakuza series

- Yakuza / Like a Dragon character
- Akira Nishikiyama as he appears in Yakuza Kiwami (2016)
- First game: Yakuza (2005)
- Voiced by: EN: Michael Rosenbaum (Yakuza); Kaiji Tang (Yakuza 0: Director's Cut); Greg Chun (Yakuza 0: Director's Cut, singing voice); Johnny Yong Bosch (Like a Dragon: Yakuza); JA: Kazuhiro Nakaya
- Portrayed by: Mikio Ohosawa (Like a Dragon: Prologue); Claude Maki (Like a Dragon); Gaku Sano (stage play); Kento Kaku (Like a Dragon: Yakuza); Kazuhiro Nakaya (Ryu ga Gotoku Powered By Nihon Touitsu)

In-universe information
- Nationality: Japanese

Akira Nishikiyama (Japanese: 錦山 彰, Hepburn: Nishikiyama Akira), often shortened to Nishiki, is a fictional character from Sega's action-adventure game series Like a Dragon, previously titled Yakuza outside of Japan. He is the sworn brother and childhood best friend of series protagonist Kazuma Kiryu, who insists on taking the blame for Nishikiyama after he murdered their boss, which resulted in Kiryu's expulsion from the Tojo Clan, the dominant yakuza organization in Tokyo, and his imprisonment for ten years. Nishikiyama establishes the Nishikiyama Family as a "subsidiary" of the Tojo Clan, and later triggers an internal power struggle for the clan's leadership shortly after Kiryu's release, leading to the two men becoming mortal enemies.

Nishikiyama also appears as a main character in the prequel installment, Yakuza 0, which follows Kiryu's early years as a low-ranking member of the Tojo Clan. For Yakuza Kiwami, the remake of the original Yakuza, Nishikiyama's role in the narrative is expanded, with his motivations being more clearly explained.

He is voiced in Japanese by Kazuhiro Nakaya, and in English by Michael Rosenbaum in the first game and Kaiji Tang in the Director's Cut version of Yakuza 0. The character of Nishikiyama is positively received, particularly for his expanded story arc in Kiwami and when it is contrasted with his depiction as a benevolent character in 0.

== Creation and development ==
Nishikiyama has a tattoo on his back of a koi, a type of Asian carp which symbolizes strength and bravery and alludes to his namesake. The carp is closely connected to the dragon, based on the Chinese mythological tale of carps leaping over the Dragon Gate. According to the legend, carp that swim up the Yellow River in China and leap over a legendary waterfall known as the "Dragon's Gate" are transformed into dragons. This piece is done in the nukibori style, which means it does not have a background like Kiryu's dragon tattoo. The design shows an ascending koi, which thematically underscores the character and his relationship to Kiryu in the Yakuza storyline. Red and black are considered two of Japanese tattooing's traditional colors, which is intended to make Nishikiyama's tattoo especially striking. In the past prior to the widespread use of safer synthetic inks, the color red was considered to be especially macho in Japanese tattooing because of the harmful pigments it may have contained.

Nishikiyama's English voice actor, Michael Rosenbaum, was offered the role by a producer who had worked with Rosenbaum for the video game Gladius, and he was shown a completed version of the game for his consideration prior to joining the project. During an interview, he described Yakuza as "a little movie" and the kind of game that appeals to him, which motivates him to put in the effort for a good performance. He noted that recording sessions would last up to four or five hours long with a lot of dialogue to go through, hence it is not possible to do them together with other cast members in the studio due to the length of time required.

For the remake of the first Yakuza game, Yakuza Kiwami, a major theme presented by the developers of the Yakuza franchise was whether Nishikiyama was fated to betray Kiryu or whether he is simply a victim of circumstance. Sega aimed to show the reasonings behind Nishikiyama's corruption due to how he changes from Kiryu's sworn brother to a calculating and cruel mafioso. The character's Japanese voice actor, Kazuhiro Nakaya, noted that after reading the script for Kiwami, it was so rough on him that he felt like not reading any scripts for a while.

== Appearances ==
=== Video games ===
==== Yakuza ====
Nishikiyama grew up with Kiryu and Yumi Sawamura in Shintaro Kazama's Sunflower Orphanage, before joining Kazama's yakuza family in his teenage years. In 1995, Nishikiyama fatally shoots his boss, Sohei Dojima, to protect Yumi after she is kidnapped and sexually assaulted by Dojima. Kiryu tells him to flee the scene with Yumi so that Nishikiyama does not inadvertently abandon his responsibility to the family, and Nishikiyama reluctantly allows Kiryu to take the fall for his crime so he could tend to his terminally ill sister. When Kiryu returns to Kamurocho, he finds that Nishikiyama, the man he willingly gave up a decade of his freedom for, has betrayed Kazama to form his own family, and has changed into a cold, heartless man completely unlike his former self. Nishikiyama makes it clear he intends to seize control of the Tojo Clan of Tokyo, and makes a number of attempts on Kiryu's life.

It is later revealed that Reina, a bar owner and informant for Kiryu, was a mole for Nishikiyama all along. Because she was in love with him, she betrayed Kiryu, but then tried to kill him herself out of regret before being murdered by one of Nishikiyama's hitmen. Nishikiyama reveals in the final chapter of the story that he is aware of Jingu's scheme to manipulate the Tojo Clan, but doesn't care. After Kiryu went to prison and his sister died from complications of her heart condition, he chose to stop trusting anyone but himself. He reveals his romantic feelings towards Yumi, and that he that was jealous of Kiryu because she loves him, and because Kiryu was always stronger and more popular than him. Wanting to surpass Kiryu, he made sacrifices and numerous betrayals in order to claim the ten billion yen so that he may become the Tojo Clan's fourth chairman. With that realized, he would claim Yumi for himself. Yumi asks Nishikiyama if he is truly happy with the things he's done because of his obsession, and that he has failed to confront his inner problems. Nishikiyama scolds Yumi for not falling in love with the person he is, which makes her cry. Kiryu then tells Nishikiyama how he and Yumi are both irreplaceable to him. He couldn't change the hurt and pain from the past, even if he wanted to. Vowing to settle their feud once and for all, Nishikiyama accepts this final showdown with his former blood brother Kiryu, both removing their shirts to display their yakuza tattoos on their backs - the dragon and the koi. They fight to the bitter end, but Kiryu eventually wins. After Jingu fatally shoots Yumi while trying to kill Kiryu, Nishikiyama redeems himself by stabbing Jingu with a knife, giving up on the money he coveted and detonating a bomb and then sacrifices himself to kill Jingu.

==== Yakuza 0 ====
A 20 year old Nishikiyama appears in Yakuza 0, which is set seventeen years before the original Yakuza, where he is the first major character Kiryu interacts with. During the opening sequence of the game, Kiryu and Nishikiyama casually saunter through the streets of Kamurocho; players can hold a button to automatically walk beside Nishikiyama as he and Kiryu explore Kamurocho together. Nishikiyama is willing to support Kiryu when he finds himself kicked out of the Dojima Clan after he is accused of killing a man he had beaten up for a debt collection task during the opening sequence of the game. While Nishikiyama turns on his sworn brother a couple times over the course of the game, he always changes his mind and sides with Kiryu, even confessing at one point his inferiority complex towards Kiryu and that he is nothing without him, culminating in the duo teaming up together to unravel a conspiracy that threatens the balance of power within the Tojo Clan. In contrast to his original characterization, he is depicted as a warm and loving, if impulsive and emotional loudmouth who is image conscious and inclined to fun-loving pursuits. At certain points in the game's narrative, the player-controlled Kiryu can partake in multiple side activities together with Nishikiyama, such as going to karaoke establishments, batting cages together, and shopping for new suits. There are also instances where they fight alongside each other and can engage in unique team up moves against enemies.

==== Yakuza Kiwami ====
Yakuza Kiwami expands on the original game's story to follow Nishikiyama's rise to power during the ten years Kiryu was away, through a series of flashback cutscenes punctuating each chapter of the game which run parallel to Kiryu's story. Nishikiyama is shown being thrust into a leadership role that was meant for Kiryu, and the combination of stress from having to cope with his sister succumbing to a terminal illness and his guilt over letting Kiryu be punished for his crime prevents him from acting decisively as boss, allowing his subordinates to treat him with disrespect and steal from other yakuza families, while letting Nishikiyama take the blame for their actions. Nishikiyama finally snaps and decides to kill himself, but even then one of his tormentors interrupts him, triggering an epiphany for Nishikiyama in which he realizes that he must surpass Kiryu in every way in order to finally be content. Stabbing his tormentor to death, he transforms himself into a cold, calculating yakuza boss. This single-minded pursuit changes Nishikiyama so much that he spends the duration of the game trying to prove himself by killing Kiryu, having decided that he will never be complete until he has destroyed the legend of the "Dragon of Dojima".

==== Further appearances ====
Nishikiyama is occasionally referenced in sequel installments to the original Yakuza. In Yakuza 2 and its remake Yakuza Kiwami 2, Kiryu pays his respects to Nishikiyama at his grave, which is situated alongside the graves of Shintaro Kazama and Yumi Sawamura. The player will then have the option to play a recap of major events in the previous game, which are by narrated by Kiryu in flashback sequences. Nishikiyama's avatar is used in Ryū ga Gotoku Ishin! for the samurai assassin Okada Izō. The character appears as the final boss of the promotional freeware game Streets of Kamurocho, developed and released as part of Sega's 60th anniversary celebrations in October 2020. Nishikiyama is mentioned in the sequel game Like a Dragon Gaiden: The Man Who Erased His Name, which is set after Yakuza 6: The Song of Life and before, during, and after the events of Yakuza: Like a Dragon.

=== In other media ===
For the live action film adaptations of Yakuza Akira Nishikiyama is portrayed by Mikio Ohosawa in Like a Dragon: Prologue, and by Claude Maki in Like a Dragon. Gaku Sano played Nishikiyama for the stage play adaptation. Directed by Takahiro Tamura, the stage play ran with eight performances from April 24 to April 29, 2015, at the Akasaka ACT Theater in Akasaka, Minato Ward in Tokyo, Japan. Kento Kaku plays Nishikiyama in the 2024 TV series Like a Dragon: Yakuza, with Johnny Yong Bosch voicing the character in the show's English dub. Kazuhiro Nakaya reprises his role as Nishikiyama in a separate live-action series, Ryu ga Gotoku Powered By Nihon Touitsu, a collaboration between the Like a Dragon franchise and the drama series Nihon Touitsu.

== Analysis ==
Sam Greszes from Polygon opined that the conflict between positive and toxic masculinity is at the core of the Yakuza franchise, and it is exemplified in the deterioration of Kiryu's relationship with Nishikiyama; he believes that Nishikiyama's circumstances are a clear representation of the horrific manner in which toxic masculinity can warp an individual's personality. Greszes was of the view that Nishikiyama's inferiority complex, borne from being unfavorably compared with Kiryu by his adopted father and other members of the Tojo Clan, combined with a series of personal tragedies culminating in his sister's tragic death, led him to become cold and unfeeling instead of grappling with his own intense pain and sadness. Greszes suggested that this causes men such as Nishikiyama - consumed by ambition, abuse, or deep emotional repression - to violently and randomly lash out at other men, to emotionally and physically abuse women, and to betray trusted friends.

Andrew Tarantola from Engadget suggested that the majority of Kiryu's growth as a character in the series comes through his attempts to shield individuals he considers to be family from harm, such as Nishikiyama, and noted that he has many "families" with a complex degree of overlap and contradictory requirements between them. For example, Nishikiyama and Yumi were two-thirds of Kiryu's earliest family at Sunflower orphanage but also exist as part of the Serena Bar community, where Yumi worked with Reina, and where Nishikiyama and Kiryu were regular customers. Concurrently, Nishikiyama and Kazama make up the nexus of the "Tojima family", while Reina's unrequited love for Nishikiyama led her to betray Kiryu and other loyalists of the Tojo Clan, demonstrating the constant tension and competition between these factions and relationships. Series producer Masayoshi Yokoyama suggested that Kiryu never made any strong advances towards Yumi, his love interest in the original Yakuza because of Nishikiyama, but did not elaborate on whether Kiryu abstained out of respect or deterrence.

Jay Castello from Eurogamer suggested that the series as a whole, particularly Yakuza Kiwami, is underpinned by the key theme of fatherhood. They suggested that both 0 and Kiwami demonstrate how both Nishikiyama and Kiryu were failed by their father figure, Shintaro Kazama, and that this failure is the true tragedy of the story arc. They noted that this theme comes from a specifically Japanese perspective, and is tied to the culture and structure of real-life yakuza crime families. Castello emphasized that Nishikiyama's loneliness and isolation, as he is often struggling to cope with his personal issues and does not have a support network of many other characters unlike Kiryu, is further compounded by what they identified as Kazama's favoritism for Kiryu and being a consistently absent parental figure to Nishiki. Castello observed that Kiwami also deals deeply with themes of accountability, noting that Kiryu came to realize that his decision to take the fall for Nishikiyama prevented both of them from dealing with the full extent of their responsibilities. Castello pointed out that Nishikiyama's final act as an apologetic gesture is to save Kiryu and his adoptive daughter Haruka Sawamura and destroy the money he had once been fighting for, albeit in the only way he knew how to: being over the top and driven purely by emotion.

== Reception ==
Akira Nishikiyama has received a positive reception, and remains a popular character with the series' fanbase. In a 2018 popularity poll, Nishikiyama was voted as the 7th best Yakuza character.

Some reviewers agree that the release of Yakuza 0 in 2015 added a new depth to the Yakuza series, particularly to its first entry and to the character of Nishiki. Castello noted that 0 was released before Kiwami further fleshed out Nishikiyama's backstory with additional cutscene flashbacks, and it showed several facets to Nishikiyama's character which ultimately contribute to his downfall. Richard Dobson from TheXboxHub commented that Nishikiyama's stark difference in personality from 0 to its sequel never needed explaining on account of 0 not existing as a prequel prior to the original game's release. Heather Alexandra from Kotaku observed that 0 takes extra time to keep Nishikiyama and Kiryu involved with each other; this is expressed by scenes where the pair remain close to each other, punctuated by slower movements and close proximity which conveys familiarity and comfort. They noted that these small interactions and Nishikiyama's ability to actually aid Kiryu in combat in 0 helps form a bond that did not exist in the original game.

There is a consensus that the additional cutscenes in Kiwami which focus on Nishikiyama help add further depth to the character and build upon his role in 0, which made Nishikiyama transitioning from a meek wise-guy to a bloodthirsty yakuza boss believable. Janine Hawkins from Polygon opined that the Nishiki-centered cutscenes are undoubtedly "the soul of the game". She praised the character's voice acting and facial animations, noting that she found the overall virtual performance so powerful that she could not be distracted by any underlying flaws and that the "pathos of Nishikiyama's side of the story could almost carry this game on its own because of that power". She found that it effectively "weaponizes all that fascinating, near-hypnotic emotiveness", in spite of the fact that much of Nishikiyama's story arc "verges on cheap".

Alexandra proclaimed Nishikiyama to be one of gaming's best antagonists, through strong writing and gameplay contrasts between Yakuza 0 and Yakuza Kiwami. She noted that while the writing for Kiwami does a lot to show Nishikiyama's changing personality, he hardly comes face to face with Kiryu for the majority of its events; but when paired with 0, the series makes direct changes to its gameplay that stress the gap between Nishikiyama and Kiryu. Alexandra formed a view that the developers is able to give the sworn brothers' tragic final meeting a true sense of gravitas through a juxtaposed narrative and shifts in gameplay, and that players gets a sense that Kiryu has lost a dear friend, which in Alexandra's view is far more memorable than any evil overlord.

Alexandra also praised the boss fight with Nishikiyama in Kiwami, calling it "a brutal display of tragic violence, a catharsis of pent-up emotion that finally explodes in a flurry of kicks and punches". In the same way characters in musicals sing to express their abundance of feelings, Alexandra compared it to Kiryu and Nishikiyama having a boss fight, and "that final release of emotions somehow clears the air". Peter Glagowski from Destructoid was less impressed with the boss battles in Kiwami, noting that the remake of the original game almost plays like a "best of" version of the entire series. He is disappointed that certain boss fights utilize enemy patterns from Yakuza 2 and Yakuza 3, and completely disregards Kiryu's different combat styles, "apart from some tacked-on heat actions that require you to change". He criticized the bosses' tendency to regenerate health while the player had to change styles to perform a special finisher.

Josh Wise from Videogamer.com suggested that the developers ought to choose Nishikiyama as the lead character of a potential sequel to Yakuza 0 as he is a compelling character in his own right, and that it should take place during the interluding ten years when Kiryu is imprisoned.
