= Like a Dragon: Yakuza =

2024 American adaptation drama television series

- Release poster
- Genre: Crime drama; Action
- Created by: Sean Crouch; Yugo Nakamura
- Based on: Yakuza / Like a Dragon by Toshihiro Nagoshi
- Starring: Ryoma Takeuchi; Kento Kaku; Yuumi Kawai; Hinano Nakayama
- Composer: Harumi Fuuki
- Countries of origin: United States; Japan
- Original languages: Japanese; English
- No. of seasons: 1
- No. of episodes: 6

Production
- Executive producers: Erik Barmack; Roberto Grande; Joshua Long; Masayoshi Yokoyama
- Production locations: Roppongi, Tokyo
- Production companies: Amazon MGM Studios; The Fool; Wild Sheep Content; 1212 Entertainment

Original release
- Network: Amazon Prime Video
- Release: October 24 – October 30, 2024

Like a Dragon: Yakuza (Note: Known in Japan as Ryū ga Gotoku: Beyond the Game (Japanese: 龍が如く～Beyond the Game～; lit. "Like a Dragon: Beyond the Game")) is a Japanese-language American crime action television series produced by Amazon MGM Studios, Wild Sheep Content, and 1212 Entertainment. It is a live-action adaptation of Sega's Like a Dragon video game series, and the first since the 2007 film Like a Dragon. It follows Kazuma Kiryu (Ryoma Takeuchi), a former yakuza released after a ten-year sentence for taking the fall for a murder committed by Akira Nishikiyama (Kento Kaku). While trying to rebuild his life, Kiryu becomes caught up in a conspiracy involving his former organization, the Tojo Clan.

The series borrows the characters and setting of the original 2005 Yakuza game as well as its 2016 remake Yakuza Kiwami, but the story is a loose adaptation and follows an original plot, though some major plot-points are retained.

The project was initially announced as a film before being retrofitted into a television series instead. It premiered on Amazon Prime Video with the first three episodes on October 24, 2024, and with the remaining three on November 1, 2024.

The series received mixed reviews, praising the series for the performances, especially from Ryoma Takeuchi and Kento Kaku, but criticized it for its inconsistent pacing, unrefined editing and the lack of fidelity towards the source material.

== Cast ==
- Ryoma Takeuchi as Kazuma Kiryu, a former yakuza who returns to society following a ten-year prison sentence and becomes involved in a power struggle between rival factions in his old crime family. He is known for his fighting skills and street smarts. Aleks Le voices Kiryu in the English dub.
- Kento Kaku as Akira Nishikiyama, Kiryu's childhood friend who has become a ruthless yakuza boss in the last ten years. Johnny Yong Bosch voices Nishiki in the English dub.
- Munetaka Aoki as Goro Majima, a one-eyed member of the Shimano Family known as "Mad Dog". Matthew Mercer voices Majima in the English dub, reprising his role from the video games.
- Yuumi Kawai as Yumi Sawamura. Xanthe Huynh voices Yumi in the English dub.
- Hinano Nakayama as Miho Nishikiyama, Nishiki's younger sister.
- Toshiaki Karasawa as Shintaro Kazama, the adoptive father of Kiryu, Nishiki, Yumi, and Miho, and a former yakuza member himself.
- Kōichi Satō as Masaru Sera, Third Chairman of the Tojo Clan
- Subaru Shibutani as Makoto Date, a police detective who previously handled the case that sent Kiryu to prison.
- Saki Takaoka as Reina, the senior hostess at the hostess club that Yumi and Miho work at.
- Ryudo Uzaki as Jin Goda, the ailing Second Chairman of the Omi Alliance
- Shōhei Uno as Koji Shindo, Nishikiyama's ambitious right-hand man.
- Masaya Kato as Sohei Dojima, the patriarch of the Dojima Family within the larger Tojo Clan. Kaiji Tang voices Dojima in the English dub.
- Tomoya Maeno as The Florist of Sai, an underground informant and ex-cop.
- Orakio as Awano, a sadistic Dojima Family hitman.

== Episodes ==
=== Season 1 ===
No.	Title	Directed by	Written by	Original release date
1	"Departure／Return"	Masaharu Take	Sean Crouch & Yugo Nakamura	October 23, 2024
2	"Ambition／Desire"	Masaharu Take	Sean Crouch & Yugo Nakamura	October 23, 2024
3	"Brothers／Sisters"	Masaharu Take	Sean Crouch & Yugo Nakamura	October 23, 2024
4	"Betrayal／Promise"	Kengo Takimoto	Kana Yamada	October 30, 2024
5	"Despair／Hope"	Kengo Takimoto	Yasuhiro Yoshida	October 30, 2024
6	"Fate／Showdown"	Masaharu Take	Yasuhiro Yoshida	October 30, 2024
