= Yakuza (franchise) =

Video game series

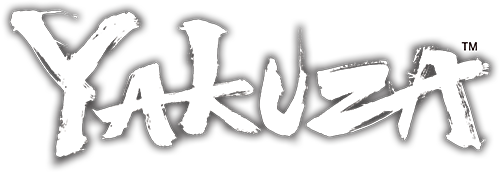
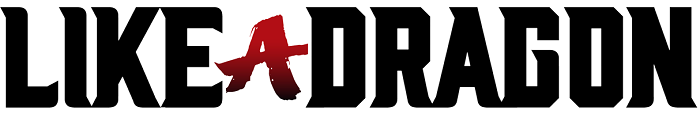
- Created by: Toshihiro Nagoshi
- Original work: Yakuza (2005)
- Owner: Sega
- Years: 2005–present

Films and television
- Film: Like a Dragon
- Television series: Like a Dragon: Yakuza

Games
- Video games: List of games

Yakuza, also known as Like a Dragon (Japanese: 龍が如く, Hepburn: Ryū ga Gotoku), is a video game series and media franchise created by Toshihiro Nagoshi for Sega. It incorporates elements of the action-adventure, beat 'em up, and role-playing genres.

Each installment is typically a crime drama, with plot lines inspired by yakuza films and pre-millennial Japanese crime dramas. The most frequently featured protagonist is Kazuma Kiryu, a reformed yakuza associated with the Kanto-based Tojo Clan. While Kiryu often finds himself working with the leaders of the Tojo Clan to thwart conspiracies aimed against them, the primary theme of the series is his desire to leave the yakuza for good and start over by raising orphans and trying to assimilate into civilian life. The gameplay of Yakuza / Like a Dragon has the player controlling Kiryu (or another character, depending on the title) in an open world where he can fight random groups of punks and gangsters, take on side missions and activities to earn experience and money, learn new moves from non-player characters (NPCs), eat and drink at various restaurants, visit hostess and cabaret clubs, craft items, and engage in a variety of mini games such as golfing, bowling, batting cages, video arcades, karaoke, and gambling games including poker, blackjack, Cee-lo, and Koi-Koi. The series is well known for the contrast between the dramatic main storyline and the humorous, over the top side content.

The franchise has become a commercial and critical success, and as of 2024, Sega has reported that the video game series has sold a combined total of 27.7 million units in physical and digital sales since its debut in 2005. Strong sales of the games in its original Japanese market has led to the franchise's expansion to other media, including film adaptations and a television series.

== Branding ==
Like a Dragon has been the franchise's branding in Japan since 2005. Yakuza was the primary international branding from 2006 to 2022, when Sega announced it would be discontinued; Like a Dragon became the international branding with Like a Dragon: Ishin! (2023). However, Sega has continued to use the Yakuza branding alongside Like a Dragon, and video game journalists continue to refer to the franchise as Yakuza.

== Setting ==
Selected locations in Yakuza / Like a Dragon games:
1 Kabukichō, Tokyo ('Kamurochō' in-game)
2 Dōtonbori & Shinsekai, Osaka ('Sotenbori' & 'Shinseicho')
3 Kokusai Dori & Downtown Naha ('Downtown Ryukyu')
4 Nakasu, Fukuoka ('Nagasugai')
5 Susukino, Hokkaido ('Tsukimino')
6 Sakae, Nagoya ('Kineicho')
7 Onomichi, Hiroshima
8 Isezakichō, Yokohama ('Isezaki Ijincho')
9 Honolulu, Hawaii

The Yakuza / Like a Dragon game series is set primarily in the fictional district of Kamurochō (神室町), which is based on Kabukichō, an actual red-light district of Tokyo. Other actual locations reproduced in the game series include:

- Dotonbori and Shinsekai, Osaka (as "Sotenbori" and "Shinseicho" in-game, respectively, first introduced in Yakuza 2);
- Kokusai Dori and the surrounding downtown area of Naha, Okinawa (as "Downtown Ryukyu", first introduced in Yakuza 3);
- Nakasu, Fukuoka (as "Nagasugai", first introduced in Yakuza 5);
- Susukino, Hokkaido (as "Tsukimino", first introduced in Yakuza 5);
- the Nishiki district of Sakae, Nagoya (as "Kineicho", first introduced in Yakuza 5);
- Onomichi, Hiroshima (first introduced in Yakuza 6: The Song of Life);
- Isezakichō, Yokohama (as "Isezaki Ijincho", first introduced in Yakuza: Like a Dragon);
- Honolulu, Hawaii (first introduced in Like a Dragon: Infinite Wealth).

The appearances of the in-game districts and towns are based on their contemporary actual locations from the year each game came out, and are often renovated and remodeled in newer games. However, specific stores and buildings are often different or carry fictionalized branding compared to their real life counterparts, replacing them with real-life product placements or plot-important locations.

=== Characters ===
The primary protagonist of the Yakuza / Like a Dragon franchise is Kazuma Kiryu, who is playable in every numbered entry of the main video game series through Yakuza 6: The Song of Life. Some games, such as Yakuza 4 and Yakuza 5, feature multiple playable characters, with players switching between them at predetermined points in the story. Ichiban Kasuga became the new lead character of the main series games beginning with Yakuza: Like a Dragon, with up to six of his companions available as playable characters during combat sequences, though Kiryu appeared in a non-playable capacity and became playable again in subsequent installments.

Other characters have appeared as the protagonists of various spin-off titles. The samurai-era titles Ryū ga Gotoku Kenzan! and Ryū ga Gotoku Ishin! are based around fictionalized versions of historical figures Miyamoto Musashi and Sakamoto Ryōma respectively, both of whom are modeled after Kiryu. The Kurohyō: Ryū ga Gotoku subseries features its own protagonist, street punk Tatsuya Ukyo, while the Judgment subseries follows private detective Takayuki Yagami. Fist of the North Star: Lost Paradise, a video game adaptation of the manga franchise Fist of the North Star by Buronson and Tetsuo Hara, features similar gameplay and thematic links to the Yakuza / Like a Dragon franchise, with many of its characters like Kenshiro voiced by the same voice actors who play recurring characters in the main series games.

== Gameplay ==
Exploration gameplay of Yakuza 5. A recurring character, Shun Akiyama, is seen exploring Sotenbori, a recurring setting. Akiyama is drunk (a recurring status effect in the series) as indicated by the bottle icon in the game's HUD. An enemy approaches, in the process of interrupting the exploration mode by triggering a random battle encounter.

All Yakuza / Like a Dragon games feature a mixture of combat, story and exploration. The main character randomly encounters foes on their path, triggering combat. In fights, the player character uses hand-to-hand combat, using combos, grabs, throws and finishing moves, and some games allow the player character to select from and use multiple fighting styles. Players can also grab nearby objects on the street to beat the enemies. Despite the emphasis on hand-to-hand combat, weapons can be obtained and used by grabbing weapons dropped by the enemies or purchasing them from weapon shops. Some characters, such as Goro Majima and Tatsuo Shinada, have fighting styles centered around their trademark weapons, which have infinite durability. Winning some of these battles can result in obtaining money or items which can be sold or used to purchase equipment or a variety of items in shops, gamble, or play mini-games. Battles end quicker by finishing the enemies using powerful moves called Heat Actions, which require the filling of the 'Heat Gauge' to become usable. Some of these tend to include quick time events. As the player character fights, they gain experience points that can be used to increase their stats and become a stronger fighter. The eighth installment in the series, Yakuza: Like a Dragon, includes a new battle system where the player character recruits party members to fight alongside them in turn-based role-playing game battles against enemies, and to play alongside them in mini-games. Due to its success, Sega has confirmed that future titles will continue to use turn-based gameplay, while the Judgment series will retain the action gameplay of earlier titles. However, there is no solid plan, the type of gameplay is chosen depending on what is considered to be best suited for the story.

The series has a high number of sub-stories, which are side missions that often complement the main story. These give the player extra experience. There are many mini-games; for example, Yakuza: Like a Dragon featured a total number of 24 different minigames. The games range from activities like bowling, darts, and arcade games, to much more complex ones, like professions, which can take a number of hours over the course of several sessions to complete. Examples include:

- Coliseum Fights: where the player fights in three-round mini championships against various opponents in different challenges to earn points which can be spent on unique items.
- Weapon/gear crafting: the player needs to find various components and blueprints to produce powerful and varied gear and weapons.
- Cabaret Club Management: the player runs a hostess club in three-minute sessions and tries to earn as much money as possible by matching up the right girl with the right client and quickly responding to their calls for help. They also take part in battles against other hostess clubs.
- Pocket Circuit: a minigame where Pocket Circuit cars (like slot cars, but bounded by the car's lane and self-powered, similar to Tamiya's Mini 4WD line of scale model cars) race against each other. In both Yakuza 0 and Yakuza Kiwami, there are several race series that take place and a number of side stories relating to this minigame.
- Hostess/Cabaret Clubs: this involves talking to hostess girls to fill out their "love" gauge, as well as ordering the right food/drink, buying gifts and wearing the right accessories to please them as much as possible, until they can be taken out on a date. This was one of many aspects that was controversially cut from the Western release of Yakuza 3, leading to criticism of Sega for ignoring Western gamers' desire to experience Japanese culture. This content was restored in the remastered version.
- Club Sega: a virtual recreation of the real-life Sega arcade chain that features activities such as UFO catchers, darts, and playable emulations of classic Sega arcade titles such as Fantasy Zone and Virtua Fighter. The available games differ with each series installment. Some entries also feature playable Master System games.

A recurring superboss known as Amon appears in most of the games. Depending on the title, there may be more than one. For example, Yakuza 5 features an Amon for each playable character, including an idol version for Haruka to face off against.

== Development ==
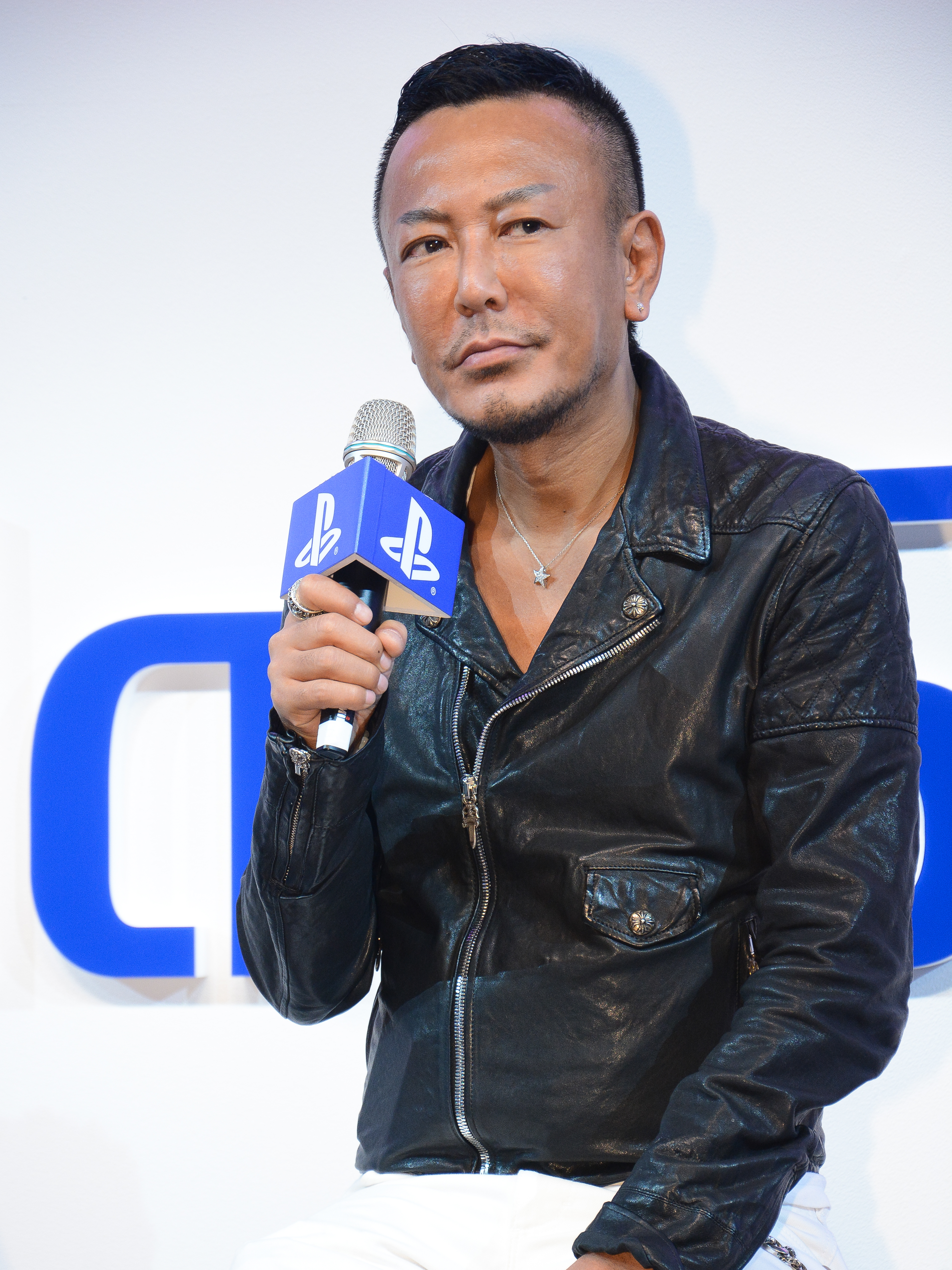
Toshihiro Nagoshi, who initially conceived the series

The series originated from creator Toshihiro Nagoshi's desire to design a game that would tell the way of life of the yakuza. Nagoshi initially struggled to greenlight the project. Portrayals of the Japanese underworld were common in manga and movies, but not in video games. Toshihiro Nagoshi brought his story for Yakuza to scenario supervisor Hase Seishu two years before the game started development. Seishu had been a video game player since the days of Space Invaders, but over the past four or five years he had lost interest, as he was less concerned with 3D visuals and gameplay than he was with story. Yakuza, however, caught his attention, and he decided to accept the project even though it came at the busiest point of his professional writing career. Masayoshi Yokoyama was the writer of the development team at Sega and worked under Seishu's guidance for the first two games of the franchise.

Touching upon the game's name, Nagoshi revealed that it was his idea: the original Japanese name Ryū ga Gotoku translates to "Like a Dragon", as Nagoshi felt that dragons have a strong image about them, and that when players sample it, they would, as the title suggests, get a feel for the strength and manliness of the main character.

Sega's leadership was hesitant about the perceived limited appeal, but eventually approved the development of the project. Sony and CERO were initially disapproving about the depiction of violence and adult material, though Sony eventually showed interest in the prospect of the game after Nagoshi persevered.

=== Music ===
The three Yakuza original soundtrack albums are composed by Hidenori Shoji, Hideki Sakamoto et alii and are published by Wave Master. Additional soundtrack features songs from Japanese artists Crazy Ken Band, Zeebra, Ketsumeishi and Eikichi Yazawa.

=== Voice cast ===
A Yakuza 3 Event Mode minor character's face being modeled in 3D through Softimage XSI 6.5. During this scan, the actor wore a swim cap to substitute for his character's police peaked cap.

The game's original voice actors are Japanese celebrities who encompass voice actors, singers, tarento, film or TV series actors, radio or television celebrities. Cabaret girls and alike characters have featured models, gravure idols and adult actresses as voice actresses and likenesses. Since the 2008 spin-off Ryū ga Gotoku Kenzan!, the game series' main characters have their face modeled in 3D after their voice actors. As in the Virtua Fighter series, Western main and minor characters do not speak in Japanese, but rather in English. Minor Chinese and Korean characters also often speak their native tongues.

The first game in the series was dubbed into English when released outside of Japan. However, due to criticism of the English voice acting, each subsequent Western release through Yakuza 6 retained the original Japanese voice acting. Beginning with the release of the 2018 spinoff Fist of the North Star: Lost Paradise, all new entries in the series have featured dual language voiceover support in their Western release.

The PlayStation 3 installments' realistic character design is based on Cyberware 3D scanner, Softimage XSI 6.5 3D models and Sega's Magical V-Engine.

=== Localization changes ===
When the series was internationalized and localized to fit the Western market, several changes occurred. Prior to 2022, the series was renamed to Yakuza outside of Japan, although the eighth main entry used its original name as a subtitle. Following the reveal of three titles at RGG Summit 2022, Sega confirmed plans to rebrand the series as "Like a Dragon" to more closely align with the original Japanese title, beginning with the remaster of Like a Dragon: Ishin! and Like a Dragon Gaiden: The Man Who Erased His Name in 2023. Despite this, re-releases of games already available outside Japan such as Yakuza 0 Director's Cut and Yakuza Kiwami 3 retain their original title treatments.

Yakuza 4 adjusted several localization changes, following criticism of the previous games, and in particular the content excised from the Western release of Yakuza 3. Producer Noguchi noted that there was an attempt to "bring a more complete localization that was more faithful to the source material". This included reversing several name changes. In addition, some conventions were changed; in previous Western localizations, protagonist Kazuma Kiryu had been referred to primarily by his given name. Beginning in Yakuza 4, he is referred to primarily by his family name, Kiryu, which more closely reflects the original dialogue.

== Games ==
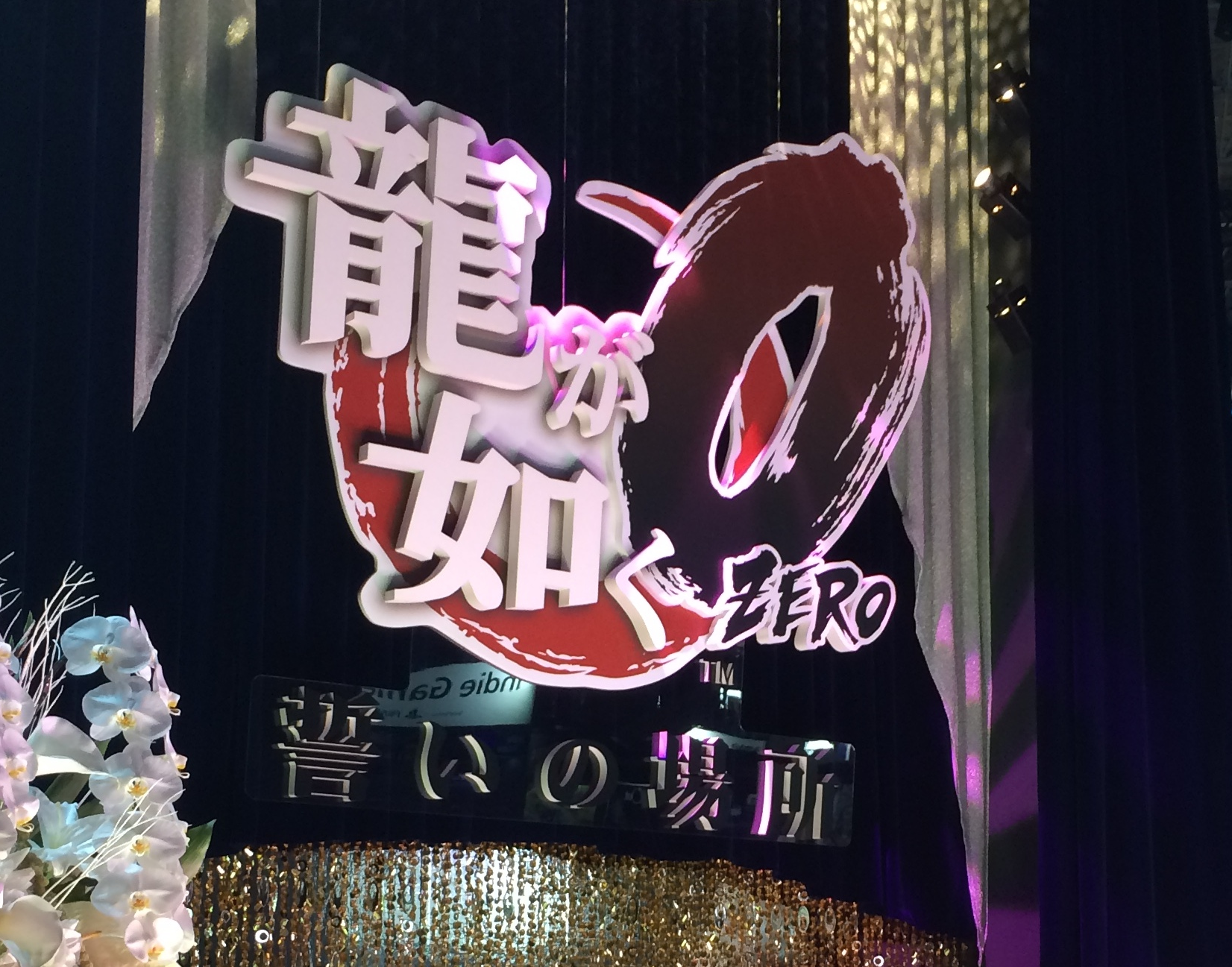
Advertising at Tokyo Game Show 2014 for Yakuza 0

As of 2024, the Yakuza / Like a Dragon series includes nine main games, with each installment following the events of the previous title. With the exception of the prequel Yakuza 0, they were released in chronological order. There are also several spin-off titles, either starring different protagonists or featuring different settings.

With the exception of the Kurohyō: Ryū ga Gotoku titles, which were developed by Syn Sophia, and Streets of Kamurocho, which was developed by Empty Clip Studios, all games were developed by Sega's CS1 R&D team, later renamed Ryū ga Gotoku Studio, and currently as RGG Studio.

Release timeline Major releases in bold
2005	**Yakuza**
2006	**Yakuza 2**
2007
2008	Kenzan!
2009	**Yakuza 3**
2010	**Yakuza 4**
2010	Kurohyō: Shinshō
2011	Dead Souls
2012	Kurohyō 2: Ashura Hen
2012	**Yakuza 5**
2013
2014	Ishin!
2015	**Yakuza 0**
2016	Yakuza Kiwami (**remake**)
2016	**Yakuza 6: The Song of Life**
2017	Yakuza Kiwami 2 (**remake**)
2018	Fist of the North Star: Lost Paradise
2018	Ryū ga Gotoku Online
2018	Judgment
2019
2020	**Yakuza: Like a Dragon**
2020	Streets of Kamurocho
2021	Lost Judgment
2022
2023	Like a Dragon: Ishin! (**remake**)
2023	Gaiden: The Man Who Erased His Name
2024	**Like a Dragon: Infinite Wealth**
2025	Gaiden: Pirate Yakuza in Hawaii
2026	Yakuza Kiwami 3 & Dark Ties (**remake**)
2027	Stranger Than Heaven

=== Main series ===
The storytelling of the series is inspired by yakuza films, one of the most popular cinematic genres in Japan; specifically, the category of direct to video "V-Cinema" that was popular in video rental stores in Japan. Novelist Hase Seishu, a writer of yakuza crime fiction, consulted on the first two games. The main story in each game is presented in chapters.

- **Yakuza**: The first game follows the story of Kazuma Kiryu, a formerly promising yakuza who is released from a ten-year prison sentence in December 2005, having taken the fall for the murder of his family's patriarch to protect his sworn brother, Akira Nishikiyama. He discovers that the Tojo Clan, whom he was once sworn to, has had ¥10 billion (approximately US$100 million) stolen from their accounts, and the clan's third chairman has been murdered, resulting in a power vacuum. Kiryu finds himself forced back into the brutal, lawless world of the yakuza, while also protecting a young girl, Haruka Sawamura, who is seemingly tied to the missing 10 billion.
- **Yakuza 2**: A year after restoring order within the Tojo Clan, Kiryu is drawn back into their conflict as the clan's fifth chairman is gunned down. Kiryu is forced to take action against Ryuji Goda, an ambitious yakuza from a rival clan, the Omi Alliance, who seeks an all-out war with the Tojo Clan. Seeking new and old allies, Kiryu is tasked with stopping a fallout between both organizations, while also facing the threat of a Korean mafia syndicate.
- **Yakuza 3**: In March 2009, Kiryu now runs the Morning Glory Orphanage in Okinawa, where he raises nine children, including his surrogate daughter Haruka. When a business deal backed by members of the Tojo Clan threatens to tear down the orphanage, Kiryu travels from the beaches of Okinawa back to Kamurocho to confront new emerging threats within the clan.
- **Yakuza 4**: In March 2010, Kiryu finds himself once again caught up in events beyond his control. First, a yakuza from a syndicate allied with the Tojo Clan is fatally shot by a member of the clan. Then, a man investigating the murder is stabbed to death. These events spark a full-blown struggle for money, power, and above all, honor, in a story experienced through the eyes of Kiryu and three new characters: loan shark Shun Akiyama; former yakuza and convict Taiga Saejima; and corrupt cop Masayoshi Tanimura.
- **Yakuza 5**: In December 2012, the seventh chairman of the Omi Alliance is on his deathbed. His death would end the hard-won truce between the Tojo Clan and the Omi Alliance, opening the door for renewed conflict. Anticipating this, the Tojo Clan is forced to strengthen their organization by aligning themselves with older clans based in other major cities across Japan to create a massive new syndicate rivaling that of the Omi Alliance. This new alliance would breach the old traditional barriers of clan territories, leading Tojo Clan chairman Daigo Dojima to head for Fukuoka. Kiryu, now working as a taxi driver, reluctantly returns to his old organization, determined to end the old struggle between the clans for good. He shares the story with returning Yakuza 4 characters Shun Akiyama and Taiga Saejima, and a new ally, the disgraced baseball player Tatsuo Shinada.
- **Yakuza 0**: In December 1988, many years before the original Yakuza, a young Kiryu is framed for the murder of a civilian, leaving him stripped of his place in the Tojo Clan and forcing him to rebuild his reputation from scratch. At the same time, cabaret club manager Goro Majima finds himself protecting a helpless blind girl whom he was ordered to assassinate, making him a target for defying orders. The two must each attempt to protect themselves and uncover the truth, including how both incidents are tied to the mysterious "Empty Lot".
- **Yakuza 6: The Song of Life**: In 2016, after willingly spending three years in prison for his past crimes, Kiryu is released only to discover that Haruka has disappeared, later found comatose and critically injured after a hit-and-run accident. A devastated Kiryu decides to travel to Onomichi Jingaicho in Hiroshima, hoping to find the truth behind what happened to Haruka while protecting her infant son.
- **Yakuza: Like a Dragon**: In 2019, Ichiban Kasuga, a former member of the Tojo Clan's Arakawa Family, is released after eighteen years in prison for a murder he didn't commit. Expecting to be welcomed back, he instead discovers that his former patriarch has aligned himself and his family with the Omi Alliance and the police to destroy the Tojo Clan. Shot and left for dead in Yokohama by the man he looked up to as a second father, Kasuga, joined by a group including a homeless nurse, a disgraced cop, and a hostess who lost her employer to gang violence, sets out to uncover the truth behind his patriarch's betrayal while becoming a hero to the outcasts of Yokohama.
- **Like a Dragon: Infinite Wealth**: In 2023, Kasuga learns that his biological mother, Akane, is still alive and residing in Honolulu, Hawaii. Kasuga travels to Honolulu on his own, and allies with Kiryu to find and protect Akane from various local criminal organizations. Kiryu also struggles with his own survival, having contracted cancer with an undetermined amount of time to live.

=== Spin-offs ===
- **Ryū ga Gotoku Kenzan!**: The first franchise spin-off, Kenzan! is set in Kyoto during the Edo period, in 1605, and follows the life of legendary swordsman Miyamoto Musashi. The game was released in Japan and Asia on March 6, 2008.
- **Kurohyō: Ryū ga Gotoku Shinshō**: Formerly known under the working title "Project K", Kurohyō is a spin-off that follows Tatsuya Ukyo, a street punk who gets into trouble with the Tojo Clan after accidentally killing one of their captains. Co-developed by Syn Sophia, it was released in Japan on September 22, 2010, for the PlayStation Portable.
  - **Kurohyō 2: Ryū ga Gotoku Ashura hen**, a sequel to Kurohyō, was released in Japan on March 22, 2012.
- **Yakuza: Dead Souls**: Dead Souls is a non-canon story set during a zombie outbreak in Kamurocho. It was initially scheduled for Japanese release on March 17, 2011, but the release was delayed to June 9, 2011, following the Tohoku earthquake on March 11, 2011. The game was later released in the West in March 2012.

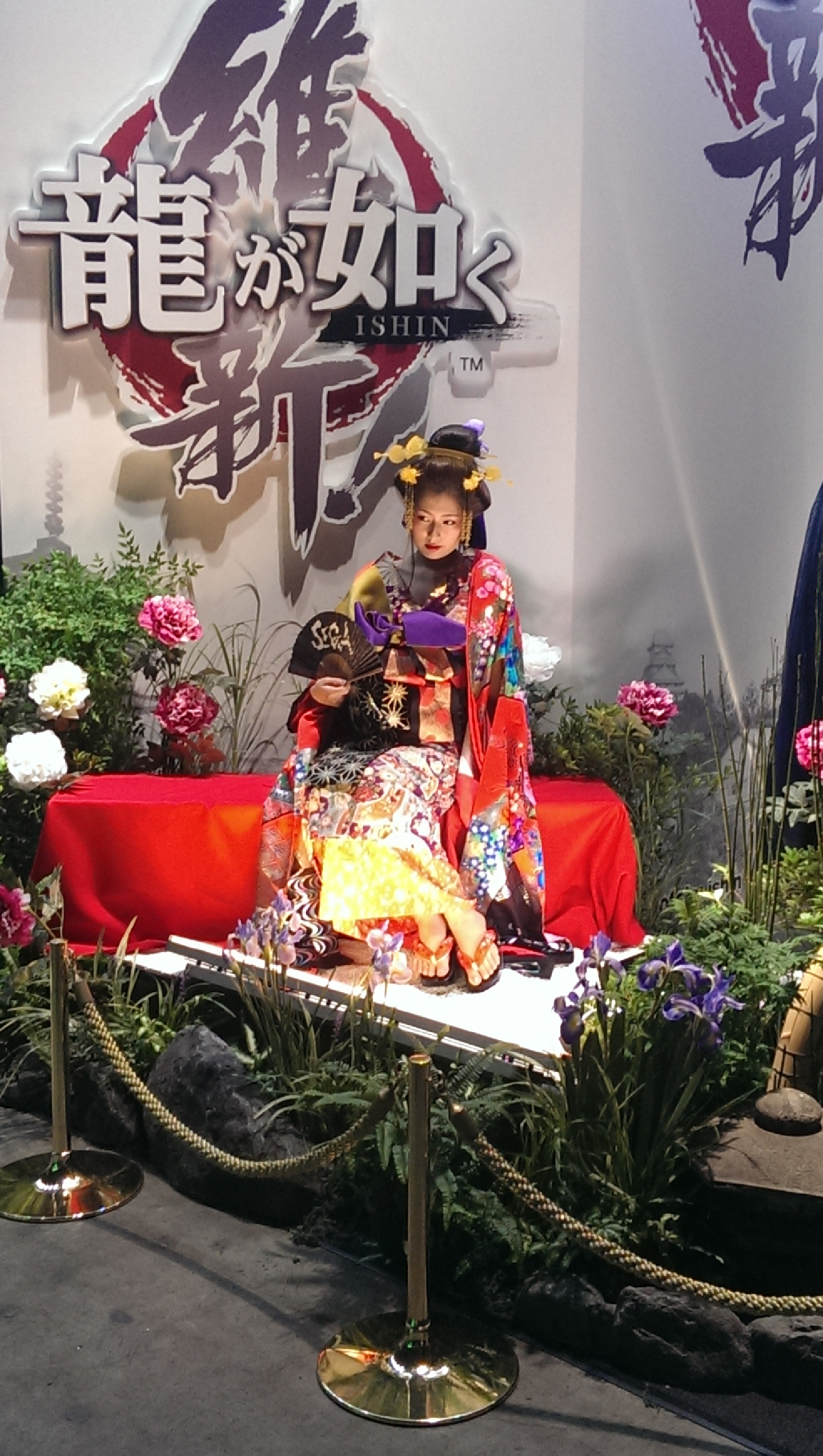
Promotion for Ryū ga Gotoku Ishin! at Tokyo Game Show 2013

- **Ryū ga Gotoku Ishin!**: a spin-off set during Japan's Bakumatsu period (between 1853 and 1867) that follows the adventures of samurai Sakamoto Ryōma. It was released in Japan on PlayStation 3 and as a launch title for PlayStation 4 on February 22, 2014.
- **Fist of the North Star: Lost Paradise**: a spin-off title based on the manga series Fist of the North Star, while utilizing gameplay mechanics of the Yakuza / Like a Dragon franchise. The game was released for the PlayStation 4 in Japan on February 22, 2018, and worldwide on October 2, 2018. It was the first Yakuza / Like a Dragon title since the original 2005 game to release with an English dub, and the first overall with dual audio options. Kazuma Kiryu appears as an equippable DLC skin, while other Yakuza / Like a Dragon characters make minor cameo appearances. The story follows Kenshiro, an expert martial artist who travels the post-apocalyptic land of Asura seeking his lost fiancée Yuria, who is hiding in Eden, "the city of miracles".
- **Ryū ga Gotoku Online**: a non-canonical free-to-play collectible card game spin-off released on Android, iOS, and PC on November 21, 2018. The game features both Kazuma Kiryu and new protagonist Ichiban Kasuga.
- **Judgment**: a legal thriller set in the same world as the mainline Yakuza / Like a Dragon games, and follows lawyer-turned-private detective Takayuki Yagami (portrayed by Japanese actor Takuya Kimura and voiced in English by Greg Chun) whose investigation into a serial killer in Kamurocho unravels a shocking conspiracy. The game employs a fighting system similar to the one from Yakuza 0 where players can use different styles of attack. Additionally, it features an investigation mode where the player has to find evidence at crime scenes. It was released for PlayStation 4 on December 13, 2018, with a Western release following in June 2019. A remastered version of Judgment was released for the PlayStation 5 and Xbox Series X on April 23, 2021, while a Windows release was made available on September 14, 2022.
  - **Lost Judgment**, a sequel to Judgment, was released in September 2021 for PlayStation 4, PlayStation 5, Xbox One, and Xbox Series X/S. The game was released on Windows alongside Judgment on September 14, 2022. In it, Yagami and his allies are called in to investigate bullying in a private school in Isezaki Ijincho (the setting of Yakuza: Like a Dragon). This seemingly innocuous case soon overlaps in surprising and sinister ways with both the discovery of a murder victim in the city, and a highly publicized sexual assault case in Tokyo. The game expands on the gameplay in Judgment, featuring additional fighting styles for Yagami and more refined and balanced investigation procedures. Lost Judgment also features a story expansion, The Kaito Files, which is a self-contained four-chapter story that follows Yagami's ally and best friend Masaharu Kaito as he investigates the appearance in Kamurocho of a woman who was previously thought dead, and encounters a young man who claims to be his son. Like Yagami, Kaito has multiple fighting styles, although Kaito's emphasize his "unrefined and reckless" strength rather than agility.
- **Streets of Kamurocho**: a side scrolling beat 'em up minigame inspired by the Streets of Rage series, featuring characters from the Yakuza / Like a Dragon franchise. The minigame was developed by Empty Clip Studios and was available on Windows via Steam between October 17–19 and November 13–16, 2020, as part of Sega's 60th anniversary celebration.
- **Like a Dragon Gaiden: The Man Who Erased His Name**: a spin-off title that takes place concurrently with the events of Yakuza: Like a Dragon, starring Kazuma Kiryu as the protagonist. The game explores Kiryu's life following the end of Yakuza 6 as a secret agent working for the Daidoji faction, leading to his involvement in Like a Dragon and Infinite Wealth. The game was announced on September 14, 2022, with a release date of November 9, 2023, on PlayStation 4, PlayStation 5, Xbox One, Xbox Series X/Series S and Windows.
- **Like a Dragon: Pirate Yakuza in Hawaii**: a spin-off title starring Goro Majima, Pirate Yakuza in Hawaii takes place after the events of Infinite Wealth, and features an amnesiac Majima taking on the role of a pirate captain as he pursues a hidden treasure while battling local Hawaiian pirates and ex-yakuza members. The game was announced on September 20, 2024, with a release date of February 21, 2025, on PlayStation 4, PlayStation 5, Xbox One, Xbox Series X/Series S and Windows.
- **Stranger Than Heaven**: a prequel to the events of the Like a Dragon series, which takes place in five different Japanese districts across five different eras. The game follows the life of Makoto Daito, a young Japanese-American outcast who travels to Japan to start a new life, and his eventual founding of the Tojo Clan. The game is set to release on January 15, 2027, on PlayStation 5, Xbox Series X/Series S and Windows.

=== Re-releases and compilations ===
- A high-definition remaster of the first two games in the series, titled **Ryū ga Gotoku 1&2 HD**, was released in Japan on November 1, 2012, for PlayStation 3. The high-definition remaster was ported to Wii U and released in Japan on August 8, 2013, under the title **Ryū ga Gotoku 1&2 HD for Wii U**. Both versions of the compilation were only released in Japan.
- **Yakuza Kiwami**, a remake of Yakuza, was released in Japan on January 21, 2016, for PlayStation 3 and PlayStation 4; the PS4 version received a Western release in August 2017. The two versions were the top two best-selling games in Japan during their release week, selling 103,256 copies for PlayStation 4 and 60,427 for PlayStation 3. The game was later released for Windows on February 19, 2019, and for Xbox One on April 22, 2020. The game released on the Nintendo Switch on October 24, 2024 to coincide with the release of the Amazon Prime adaptation, Like a Dragon: Yakuza.
- **Yakuza Kiwami 2**, a remake of Yakuza 2, was released for the PlayStation 4 on December 7, 2017, in Japan, and in North America and Europe on August 28, 2018. The game runs on the Dragon Engine, which was previously used in Yakuza 6: The Song of Life. The remake also adds The Majima Saga, a new prequel story that feature Goro Majima as a playable character, continuing stories of his that were previously established in Yakuza 0. Kiwami 2 was released for Windows on May 9, 2019, and for Xbox One on July 30, 2020.
- A compilation re-release, titled **The Yakuza Remastered Collection**, was announced and released digitally in English-speaking territories on August 20, 2019, for the PlayStation 4. The collection contains the remastered versions of Yakuza 3, Yakuza 4 and Yakuza 5, which were released in Japan individually between 2018 and 2019. The remasters feature re-translated game scripts and include most content removed from the original English releases, though some content was removed from all versions, such as a set of missions in Yakuza 3 featuring a transphobic character depiction. At the time of the collection's launch, only Yakuza 3 was available; Yakuza 4 was released on October 29, 2019, and Yakuza 5 was released on February 11, 2020. A physical release containing all three games was released alongside Yakuza 5 with a collectible PlayStation 3 styled case for Yakuza 5, which was initially a digital-only release in the West. The Yakuza Remastered Collection was released for Xbox One and Windows on January 28, 2021.
- **Like a Dragon: Ishin!**, a remake of the original spin-off title Ryū ga Gotoku Ishin!, was released on February 21, 2023, for PlayStation 4, PlayStation 5, Xbox One, Xbox Series X/Series S and Windows. Like a Dragon: Ishin! is developed on Unreal Engine 4.
- **Yakuza 0 Director's Cut**, an expanded re-release of Yakuza 0, was announced in April 2025 and released on June 5, 2025, as a launch title and timed exclusive for Nintendo Switch 2. Versions for PlayStation 5, Windows and Xbox Series X/S later released on December 8, 2025. It features new cutscenes, options for English and Chinese voiceover, as well as subtitles in French, German, Italian and Spanish, and an online multiplayer horde mode called Red Light Raid, which allows multiple players to select from a roster of 60 characters and fight waves of enemies.
- **Yakuza Kiwami 3 & Dark Ties**, a remake of Yakuza 3, was announced in September 2025, and was released on February 12, 2026, for Nintendo Switch 2, PlayStation 4, PlayStation 5, Windows and Xbox Series X/S. The game features an additional storyline taking place before the events of Yakuza 3, starring Yoshitaka Mine as the playable character.

== Adaptations ==
The Yakuza / Like a Dragon franchise includes various types of merchandise and adaptations outside of the video games. This includes a direct-to-video movie, a feature film, a stage play, original soundtracks, official guides, Kamutai Magazines (pre-order campaign limited book) and other licensed products such as Cropped Heads long tee shirts and parkas based on main characters tattoos, limited edition PlayStation 3 console packs, Kubrick toys and action figures manufactured by Maitan.

=== Books ===
Kamutai Magazine (カムタイマガジン)
Date	Game	Cover Model(s)	Ref.
Dec 2005	Yakuza	Mihiro	
Dec 2006	Yakuza 2	Nana Natsume	
Mar 2008	Kenzan	Yinling of Joytoy	
Feb 2009	Yakuza 3	Shizuka Mutou; Sayaka Araki; Rina Sakurai	
Mar 2010	Yakuza 4	—	
Sep 2010	Kurohyō	Takumi Saitoh	
Mar 2012	Kurohyō 2	—	
Mar 2015	Yakuza 0	—	

For the Japanese and Asian market releases of the original game in 2005, Sega created a pre-order campaign limited bonus item called Kamutai Magazine, a full-color magazine which was a travel guide to the fictional in-game location of Kamurocho. The first book was a monography dedicated to the game with Mai, a sub-scenario female character, as the cover girl. This character's physical aspect was inspired by its voice actor, Mihiro, a Japanese adult video idol.

Many of the new Yakuza series games since have included a new Kamutai Magazine issue as a preorder bonus in Japan, featuring a voice actress as cover girl. Hence this December 2005 issue was followed by a December 2006 issue (cover girl is Japanese AV idol Nana Natsume), a March 2008 issue (cover girl is Taiwanese model Yinling of Joytoy) and a February 2009 issue (cover girls are Shizuka Mutou, Sayaka Araki and Rina Sakurai). The fifth issue was bundled with Ryu Ga Gotoku 4 and released in March 2010.

=== Original video ===
Takeshi Miyasaka directed an original video during the promotion period for the Western release of the game, which depicted Kiryu, Nishikiyama, and Yumi growing up at the Sunflower Orphanage and leaving for Tokyo. This short film called Like a Dragon: Prologue (龍が如く 〜序章〜, ryu ga gotoku -joshou-) serves as a prequel and sets up the events that take place in the game.

=== Feature film ===
A film adaptation was released in Japanese theaters on March 2, 2007, called Like a Dragon: The Movie (龍が如く 劇場版, ryu ga gotoku: gekijoban). It is based on the first installment of the series and was directed by Takashi Miike. The movie premiered in the United States on June 23 at IFC theater. American distributor Tokyo Shock, a Media Blasters affiliate, released a licensed DVD on February 23, 2010.

A live-action film adaptation of Stranger Than Heaven was announced to be in development in September 2026, as part of a collaboration between Sega and Netflix.

=== Radio dramas ===
Since September 2008, Japanese voice actors from the Yakuza / Like a Dragon series, including Takaya Kuroda (Kazuma Kiryu) and Hidenari Ugaki (Goro Majima), are running a radio drama which is known as Ryu Ga Gotoku Presents Kamuro-cho Radio Station (龍が如くPresents神室町RADIOSTATION). The second season Shin Kamuro-cho Radio Station (新・神室町RADIOSTATION), which covers 2009~2010, is ongoing with back number episodes available for download as podcasts. Past episodes from the 2008~2009 season, Kamuro-cho Radio Station (神室町RADIOSTATION), are also available as archived podcasts.

=== TV series ===
A television series was adapted based on the spin-off PSP title Kurohyō: Ryū ga Gotoku Shinshō which began airing on TBS on October 5, 2010, and ended after 11 episodes. The series spawned a sequel in 2012 based on the 2011 PSP game Kurohyō 2: Ryū ga Gotoku Ashura hen, the series also ran for 11 episodes

The Kamurocho Caba Jou TV (神室町キャバ嬢 T V) is a Japanese web television dedicated to the series's cabaret girls. Main contents are audition and girls profile, but it can also be related to other aspect of the game series; for example volume 15 focuses on its soundtrack artists. All shows, called "volumes", are archived within the web TV's official website.

A four-episode television drama titled "Yakuza: Soul Song" premiered in 2016, starring Shono Hayama in the lead role.

A Japanese and American co-produced television series adaptation titled Like a Dragon: Yakuza premiered on October 25, 2024, with Ryoma Takeuchi in the lead role of Kazuma Kiryu. Other cast members include Kento Kaku as Akira Nishikiyama, and Munetaka Aoki as Goro Majima. The project was initially announced as a film before shifting to a television series.

In September 2025, Ryu Ga Gotoku Studios announced a collaboration with the drama series Nihon Touitsu to create a new live-action Like a Dragon series. The series, titled Ryu ga Gotoku Powered by Nihon Touitsu, stars Nihon Touitsu cast members Yasukaze Motomiya and Yoshiyuki Yamaguchi in the roles of Kazuma Kiryu and Goro Majima, respectively, with Kazuhiro Nakaya reprising his role from the games as Akira Nishikiyama, and Kenji Matsuda portraying Makoto Date. The series, consisting of 3 episodes, aired February 10, 2026, on Amazon Prime Video.

=== Stage play ===
A stage play based on the events of Yakuza was performed in Tokyo from April 24 to April 29, 2015. Cast members included Eiji Takigawa, Gaku Sano, Yuma Ishigaki, and Kei Hosogai.

== Reception and impact ==
=== Critical reception ===
Game	Metacritic	GameRankings	Famitsu
Yakuza	75/100	77.67%	37/40
Yakuza 2	77/100	78.41%	38/40
Yakuza 3	79/100	79.92%	38/40
Yakuza 4	78/100	79.98%	38/40
Yakuza 5	83/100	83.79%	40/40
Yakuza 0	85/100	85.25%	36/40
Yakuza Kiwami	80/100	79.79%	34/40
Yakuza 6: The Song of Life	83/100	84.60%	39/40
Yakuza Kiwami 2	85/100	85.01%	37/40
Yakuza: Like a Dragon	84/100	N/A	38/40
Like a Dragon: Infinite Wealth	89/100	N/A	40/40
Yakuza Kiwami 3	74/100	N/A	36/40

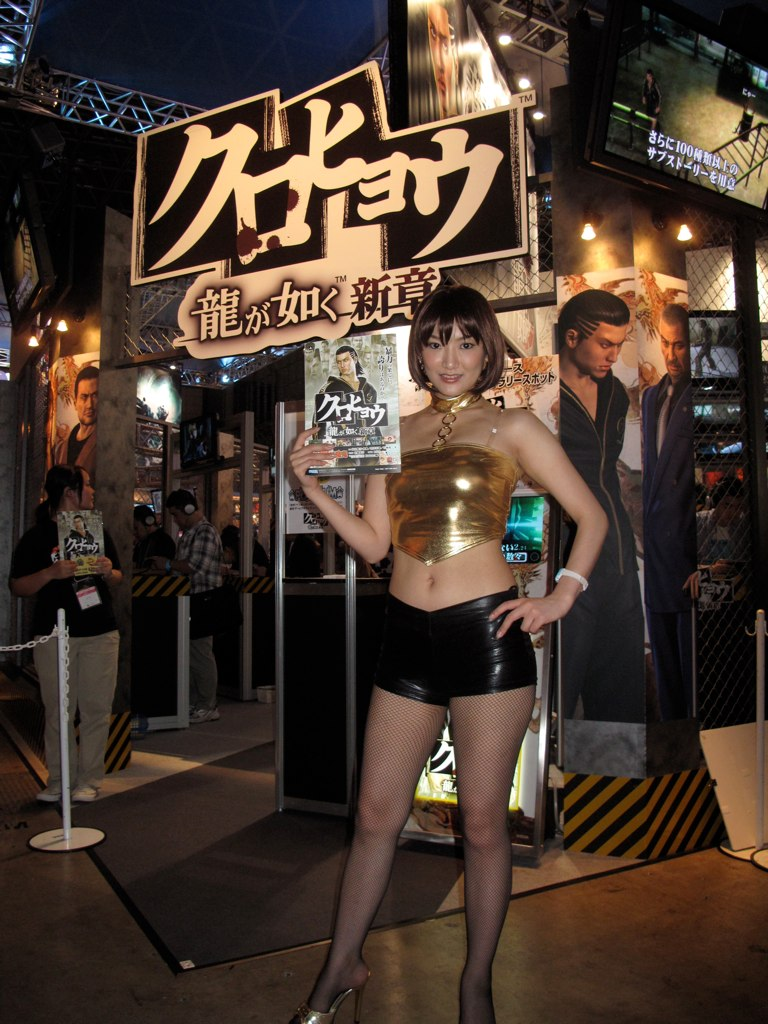
Promotion of Kurohyou at TGS 2010

The original game was heavily acclaimed in Japan for combining innovative gameplay with cinema-like storytelling and character development on the back of Japan's criminal underground. Weekly Famitsu gave high scores to the series, Yakuza scored 37/40 (92.5/100), Yakuza 2 scored 38/40 (95/100), Ryū Ga Gotoku Kenzan! scored 37/40 (92,5/100), Yakuza 3 scored 38/40 (95/100) and Yakuza 4 scored 38/40 (95/100). Yakuza 5 scored (40/40) which has the highest score out of all of the Yakuza installments. Yakuza 6: The Song of Life scored (39/40). The Western localized versions were released between one and three years after the originals and received generally favorable reviews.

Each installment earned an excellence award at the Japan Game Awards and had a PlayStation the Best re-release in both Japanese, Asian and Korean markets. The Japanese entertainment industry gave Yakuza 3 the "Award for Excellence" in the 2009 Japan Game Awards "Games of the Year Division" for its "dramatic story development, freedom of the story and the graphics elaborated up to the details of the work. In addition, amusement found in every portion of the game including the vast number of sub-stories and mini games. This work was awarded the prize for the high quality of entertainment". In 2010, the Japan Game Awards once again gave the Yakuza series game the "Award for Excellence". Yakuza 4 won due to "a rich story with a high degree of freedom that is developed from the different perspectives of the 4 characters. There are also many play spots that boast several sub-stories and mini games. The astounding quality and volume provide a high level of entertainment and was the reason for granting this award".

Although the narrative has often been praised, the poor portrayal of female characters have been noted by reviewers, with some noting that important female characters like Haruka Sawamura and Makoto Makimura are underutilized. Taking the criticism into consideration, development staff member for Judgment Scott Strichart said players have the opportunity to empathize with the sexism experienced by female characters like Saori Shirosaki in the English localization.

=== Sales ===
The series sold 3.2 million games worldwide as of 2009 and 4 million copies as of September 2010; the best sellers then being the first two games which sold between 500,000 – 1 million worldwide, each winning the PlayStation Gold Award. Yakuza 3 sold 500,000 copies in the Asian markets as of 2010, also winning SCEJ's PlayStation Gold Award. However, after Yakuza 4, Sega said that sales were slow in North America and Europe due to "the adverse market condition", noting "sluggish personal consumption" in those regions.

The series' overseas performance subsequently improved. In 2018, Sega reported that Yakuza 6: The Song of Life had sold as many copies overseas as it had in Japan, contrasting this with earlier entries for which the Japanese market had generated the majority of sales.

By June 2015, the entire series sold over 7 million units worldwide. As of 2023, the series has sold over 21 million copies. Like a Dragon: Infinite Wealth reached the milestone of 1 million copies sold one week post launch.

As of November 4, 2024, the Like a Dragon series has sold over twenty eight million copies worldwide.

=== Virtual tourism ===
Some fans have been inspired by the Yakuza / Like a Dragon game series to visit their real-world counterparts. One reviewer praised the detailed recreation of specific districts, including "trivial, incidental stuff", that enables virtual exploration of real-life locations. Although not explicitly marketed as "virtual tourism", another reviewer noted "Yakuza still gives you the best opportunity to really get engaged with a country and its people that I can think of. ... [It] has become a connection to a country I love very much, not because of the sights it shows me, but for all the boring things it lets me do". Series writer and producer Masayoshi Yokoyama particularly thinks of Yakuza 5 as a game that provides "all the fun of modern Japan".

=== Internet meme ===
In 2020, an internet meme emerged utilizing deepfakes to generate videos of people and fictional characters singing the chorus of "Baka Mitai" (ばかみたい; lit. "I've Been a Fool"), a song which first appears in the karaoke minigame of Yakuza 5. Most iterations of this meme use a 2017 video uploaded by English YouTuber Dobbsyrules, who lip syncs the Taxi Driver (Yakuza 5 (Kiryu) / Yakuza 0 / Like a Dragon Gaiden / Yakuza Kiwami 3) version of the song, as a template.

=== Connection to Shenmue ===
Journalists frequently made comparisons to Sega's Shenmue series when Yakuza was first revealed. Series creator Nagoshi was aware of this, and said that these are different games entirely and should not be compared. Shenmue creator Yu Suzuki (who worked with Nagoshi) said that the challenges that he endured while making Shenmue were something Nagoshi learned from and gave back to Sega. According to former Sega manager Hisashi Suzuki, Yakuza was only possible because of Shenmue and described it as a "Sega-like" work. Other Sega games also had an influence. It inherited elements of the SpikeOut arcade games, games that Nagoshi was previously involved in. The development tools to create the map came from Jet Set Radio.
