= Saki Takaoka =

Japanese actress (born 1972)

- Born: 高岡 佐紀子 (Takaoka, Sakiko); December 3, 1972 (age 53); Fujisawa, Kanagawa, Japan
- Years active: 1988–present
- Spouse: Naoki Hosaka (m. 1996; div. 2004)
- Children: 3
- Awards: Japanese Academy Awards – Best Actress, Newcomer of the Year; 1995 Crest of Betrayal – Oiwa

Saki Takaoka (高岡 早紀 (たかおか さき); born December 3, 1972) is a Japanese actress. She won the award for best actress at the 19th Hochi Film Award for Crest of Betrayal.

== Life and Career ==
Saki's father, a pianist, passed away, leaving her mother to raise her and her siblings as a single mother. Saki trained in ballet as a child and attended Horikoshi High School. In 1987, while trying to raise funds to study abroad with the intention of becoming a ballerina, she learned about the "3rd Cinderella Contest," which she won. This victory shifted her career focus from ballet to modeling.

Later, she ventured into acting and met Kinji Fukasaku, who cast her as Oiwa in "Chushingura Gaiden: Yotsuya Kaidan" (1994). This role marked a breakthrough in her acting career, earning her critical acclaim and the Best Actress award.

== Personal life ==
She had two sons with Naoki Hosaka, and a daughter born in 2010 from a previous relationship. Since 2014, she has been in a relationship with Atsuhisa Matsumura.

== Filmography ==
=== Film ===
- cf girl (cfガール, 1989)
- Swimming Upstream (バタアシ金魚, 1990), Sonoko
- The River with No Bridge (橋のない川, 1992), Nanae Minemura
- Crest of Betrayal (忠臣蔵外伝 四谷怪談, 1994), Oiwa
- Kyoko (KYOKO, 1996), Kyoko
- Happy People (HAPPY PEOPLE, 1997)
- Young Thugs: Nostalgia (岸和田少年愚連隊 望郷, 1998), Miss Itō
- Tales of Terror (怪談新耳袋「手袋」, 2004)
- Koi wa go-shichi-go! (恋は五・七・五!全国高校生俳句甲子園大会, 2004)
- Nureta akai ito (濡れた赫い糸, 2005)
- Female (female フィーメイル, 2005), Masako Kihara
- Desire (欲望, 2005)
- Nezu no ban (寝ずの番, 2006)
- Kanashiki Tenshi (悲しき天使, 2006)
- A Long Walk (長い散歩, 2006), Saichi's mother
- Like a Dragon (龍が如く 劇場版, 2007), Yumi Sawamura
- The Harimaya Bridge (The Harimaya Bridge はりまや橋, 2009), Noriko Kubo
- The Tempest 3D (2012)
- Eden (2012)
- Lesson of Evil (2012)
- Love For Beginners (2012)
- Monster (2013)
- A Courtesan with Flowered Skin (2013)
- 5-nijyu-Go (2014)
- Shinya Shokudo (2015), Tamako Kawashima
- Cosmetic Wars (2017)
- The Lowlife (2017)
- Snow Flower (2019)
- First Love (2021)
- Rika: Love Obsessed Psycho (2021), Rika Amamiya
- Masquerade Night (2021)
- Just Remembering (2022)
- In Love and Deep Water (2023), Misaki Kuruma
- A Day Begins (2024)
- Ravens (2025), the bar owner
- The Girl Who Sees (2025), Tōko Yotsuya

=== Television ===
- Genroku Ryōran (1999), Ojun
- Tekkōki Mikazuki (2000)
- Gunshi Kanbei (2014), Okon
- Rika (2019), Rika Amamiya
- Detective Yuri Rintaro (2020), Sakura Hara
- Rika: Rebirth (2021), Rika Amamiya
- Welcome Home, Monet (2021), Satoko Takamura
- Laughing Matryoshka (2024), as a mysterious woman
- Like a Dragon: Yakuza (2024), Reina
- Unbound (2025), Tsuyo
