= Stranger Than Heaven =

Upcoming video game

- Developer: RGG Studio
- Publisher: Sega
- Directors: Mikinobu Abe; Ryosuke Horii
- Producer: Hiroyuki Sakamoto
- Artist: Daishi Kanaya
- Writers: Masayoshi Yokoyama; Kazunobu Takeuchi
- Composer: Mitsuharu Fukuyama
- Series: Like a Dragon
- Platforms: PlayStation 5; Windows; Xbox Series X/S
- Release: January 15, 2027
- Genre: Action-adventure
- Mode: Single-player

Stranger Than Heaven (Note: Japanese: ストレンジャー ザン ヘヴン, Hepburn: Sutorenjā Zan Hevun) is an upcoming action-adventure game developed by RGG Studio and published by Sega. A distant prequel to the Like a Dragon franchise, the game will depict the journey of Makoto Daito, a Japanese-American outcast who finds a new life in Japan, spanning over the course of 50 years.

Stranger Than Heaven is set to be released for PlayStation 5, Windows and Xbox Series X/S on January 15, 2027.

== Gameplay ==
Stranger Than Heaven features a third-person perspective with a focus on action and combat. Players control the protagonist Makoto Daito and explore five different locales in five different eras. In combat scenarios, Daito's left and right sides can be controlled independently, allowing players to perform punches, kicks or blocks using buttons on the corresponding side. Daito can also utilize a variety of weapons which can be upgraded further.

Music plays a major role in Stranger Than Heaven's gameplay system; as Daito navigates the environments surrounding him, he can pick up various sounds and "save" them as "recordings"; later, Daito may encounter composers, allowing him to use the collected sounds to create original compositions. The game incorporates management activities, in which Daito must take on the role of a showman and organize different musical shows, including picking out musicians to participate, recruiting them on the street, and placing advertisements for the shows. Minigames such as arm wrestling, shooting gallery, and dice betting, are also present, tailored to each individual era.

== Premise ==
Stranger Than Heaven takes place in five different cities in Japan across five different eras: Kokura, Fukuoka Prefecture in 1915; Kure, Hiroshima Prefecture in 1929; Minami, Osaka Prefecture in 1943; Atami, Shizuoka Prefecture in 1951; and Shinjuku, Tokyo in 1965. The game chronicles the life of Makoto Daito (Yu Shirota), a Japanese-American orphan who stows away on a ship from San Francisco to Japan, and his struggle to settle in a new home over the course of 50 years. The game also depicts the origin of the yakuza organization Tojo Clan, prominently featured throughout the Like a Dragon series, of which Daito becomes the eventual co-founder and first chairman.

Stranger Than Heaven features a diverse cast of both Japanese and American characters, including: Yu Shinjo (Dean Fujioka), Daito's best friend and rival who is of British and Japanese descent; Orpheus (Snoop Dogg), a smuggler who takes up Daito as his disciple; Tae Matsumoto (Moeka Hoshi), a café waitress in Kokura who is also a yakuza's mistress; Suzy Day (Tori Kelly), a singer from overseas looking to make a career in Japan; Heigo Yashima (Akio Otsuka), a merchant in Kokura who built his fortune in the trade business; Kiyoshi Otsuru (Tokuma Nishioka), a "stylish" old man with authority; Takashi (Satoshi Fujihara), a young yakuza member and Daito's sworn brother who is also a gifted pianist; The Veiled Stranger (Cordell Broadus), a man stationed in post-war Japan; Keiko Shirai (Ado), a singer who is dubbed "the diva of wartime Osaka"; Genzo Iwaki (Bunta Sugawara/Takashi Ukaji), (Note: Sugawara's likeness is used to depict Iwaki, while Ukaji voices the character.) an influential yakuza boss in Kure; Tadashi Hataoka (Takashi Ukaji), a violent yakuza from Kokura; Takeo Godai (Takaya Kuroda), a skilled craftsman; Suekichi (Kouhei Tsuji), a dependable yakuza member who is also Daito's sworn brother; Tetsuya Hama (Yasukaze Motomiya), Iwaki's right-hand man; Amaru (Tupac Shakur) (Note: Shakur's likeness is used to depict Amaru, while a yet-to-be-named actor voices the character.), a man in hiding in Japan; and Kimura (Daisuke Shiba), a nightclub employee in Kamurochō.

== Development ==
In an 2021 interview with Famitsu, it was reported that RGG Studio was working on a new IP separate from the Like a Dragon and Judgment series. Stranger Than Heaven was first announced at the Game Awards 2024 under the code name Project Century; the official title of the game would later be revealed in June 2025.

Developers from RGG Studio discussed the game in details for the first time in May 2026, as part of a presentation in collaboration with Xbox. During a follow-up livestream, studio head and executive director Masayoshi Yokoyama revealed that he announced Project Century in 2024 as he was impressed by the work on the Kokura level, which only took about two to three months to finish and had been completed by that point. Despite having narrative ties to the Like a Dragon series, Yokoyama clarified that the game is not meant to depict the past of that series, and will not feature younger iterations of certain Like a Dragon characters, or require knowledge of the series in order to play.

According to Yokoyama, Stranger Than Heaven was originally envisioned as a trilogy in order to fully realize the concept of depicting the protagonist's life over the course of five decades; however, it was decided that the final product would be one singular title to avoid fragmenting the experience and making players have to wait. The main story was developed over the course of six to seven years, as a result of its scale. It was noted that due to the game's historical setting, there would be less minigames compared to other Like a Dragon titles, while substories would also feature a notably different tone.

The scale of each location in Stranger Than Heaven is roughly comparable to those from the Like a Dragon series, though with more accessible interiors and less tall buildings. Yokoyama noted that the locations are not exact replicas of their real-life counterparts, citing the studio's prioritization of creating original play spaces over historical accuracy. To that end, real historical events from each corresponding era are also omitted from the game, unless they were directly connected to the story of the protagonist Makoto Daito.

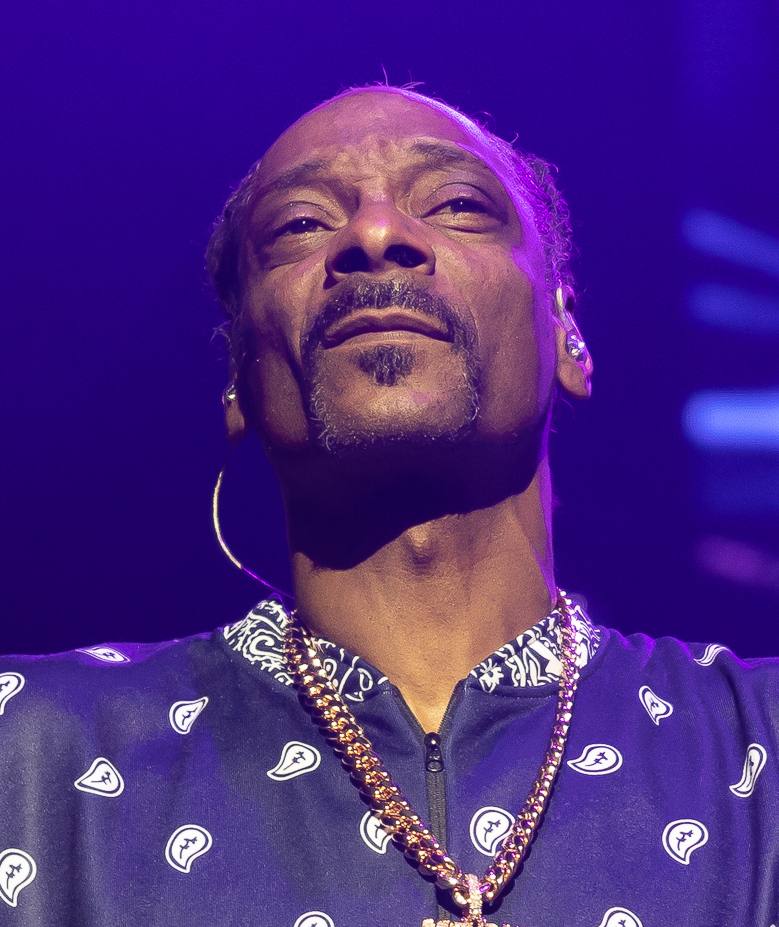
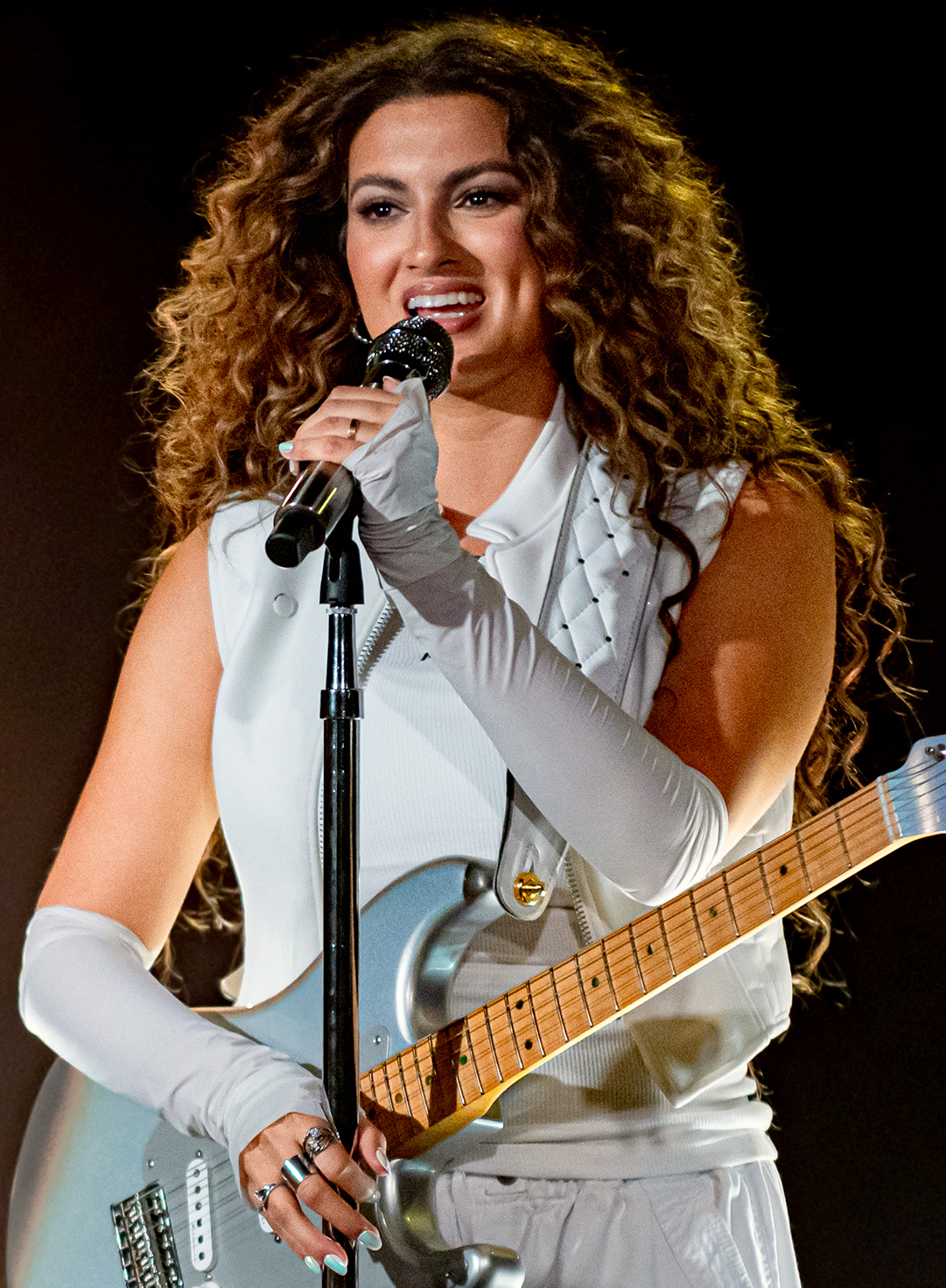
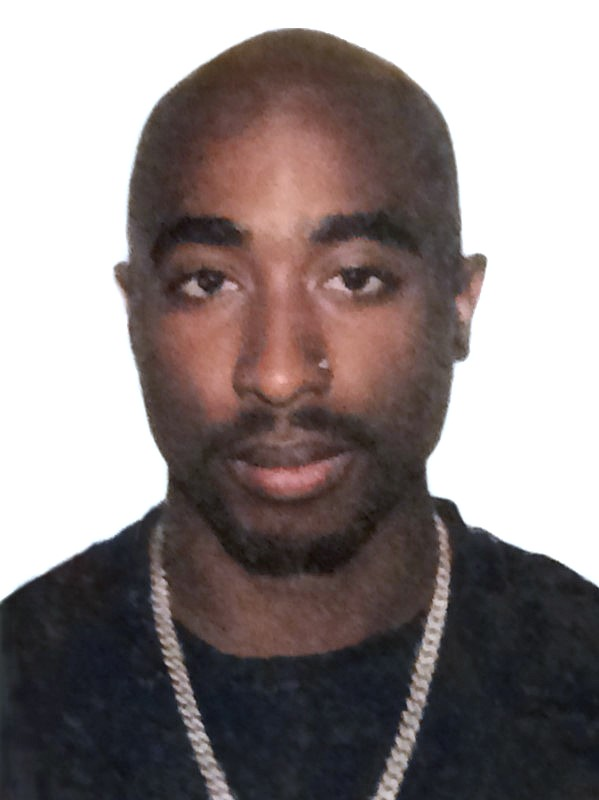
Snoop Dogg and Tori Kelly are part of Stranger Than Heaven's voice cast in addition to performing the game's theme song. Late actor Bunta Sugawara and rapper Tupac Shakur are featured in the game in the form of digital likenesses.

Stranger Than Heaven features a mixed voice cast of Japanese and American actors, including musicians Snoop Dogg, Tori Kelly, Ado and Official Hige Dandism's lead vocalist Satoshi Fujihara; all four artists perform the main theme song of the game, "Stranger Than Heaven", in addition to portraying their characters. The appearance of Ado's character, Keiko Shirai, was stated to be an original design, with supervision and approval from Ado's representatives, in an effort to maintain the singer's secret identity; Yokoyama added that any resemblance between Ado and her character would be purely coincidental. Yokoyama cited Yu Shirota as a "perfect fit" for the role of Makoto Daito, as the actor is also of mixed race, highlighting the "estranged" and "ambiguous" nature of Daito. Both Shirota and Dean Fujioka, who portrays Daito's friend and rival Yu Shinjo, have musical backgrounds, which further compliments their characters' roles and connection to the game's theme. In contrast with recent RGG Studio titles which feature separate audio tracks for Japanese and English voiceover, Stranger Than Heaven uses only one audio track with both languages being used, dependent on the setting, background, and context of each scenario. According to Yokoyama, this was done to preserve the authenticity of the game world, reflecting the characters' origins and language fluency.

Stranger Than Heaven features the likenesses of late actor Bunta Sugawara and rapper Tupac Shakur, with permission from their respective estates; Sugawara's character Genzo Iwaki is voiced by Takashi Ukaji, while a voice actor for Shakur's character Amaru has not yet been named. Speaking on the inclusion of both Sugawara and Shakur, Yokoyama stated that RGG Studio spoke to both actors' estates and their respective family members in order to ensure that the characters would honor the actors and their families, while also confirming that they would not use generative AI to replicate the actors' voices for their characters. The addition of Shakur was made late into the game's development, and was suggested to Yokoyama by Snoop Dogg, who would later introduce the studio to Shakur's estate and family to discuss his inclusion. The reveal of Shakur's involvement in the game was met with mixed reactions from fans, with some expressing concern over the use of a deceased person's likeness for profit, while others supported his appearance, believing that it was done with consent from all parties involved. Yokoyama acknowledged the international reception to the studio's decision, noting that domestic fans had a similar reaction to Sugawara's inclusion; however, he reaffirmed the studio's belief that the decision would add value to the game, and their goal was to create something that players would enjoy.

== Release ==
Stranger Than Heaven is set to release for PlayStation 5, Windows and Xbox Series X/S on January 15, 2027.

== Live-action adaptation ==
In September 2026, Sega announced that a live-action film adaptation of Stranger Than Heaven was being developed in collaboration with Netflix. Sega's Senior Executive Officer Toru Nakahara is set to be a producer of the film.
