= Kurohyō: Ryū ga Gotoku Shinshō =

2010 video game

Kurohyōu: Ryū ga Gotoku Shinshō
- Japanese cover art
- Developers: Sega CS3; Syn Sophia
- Publisher: Sega
- Directors: Akihiro Nozaki; Yukinobu Arikawa
- Producer: Yojiro Ogawa
- Designers: Katsuhito Goto; Masao Shirosaki
- Programmer: Yoshiyuki Okada
- Writer: Toshihiro Nagoshi
- Composers: Hidenori Shoji; Hyd Lunch; Yukie Sugawara; Hideki Naganuma
- Series: Yakuza
- Platform: PlayStation Portable
- Release: JP: September 22, 2010
- Genre: Action-adventure
- Mode: Single-player

Kurohyō: Ryū ga Gotoku Shinshō (Japanese: クロヒョウ 龍が如く新章; "Black Panther: Like a Dragon New Chapter"), codenamed "Project K", is a 2010 video game developed by Sega along with syn Sophia and released by Sega for the PlayStation Portable (PSP) in 2010. The game was introduced on April 21, 2010 by Famitsu and is a spin-off of Sega's Yakuza series. An adaptation of the game was televised from October 5 to December 21, 2010, on MBS and TBS.

== Overview ==
The game was developed as the 6th overall entry in the series and focused on a whole new set of characters and a new game system. Both physical and digital versions of the game exist and save data is compatible with both. The game differs from the previous spinoff, Ryū ga Gotoku Kenzan!, by being set in the time same timeline as the main series. However, the story is completely separate.

According to General Director, Toshihiro Nagoshi, theme of the work was "violence." He had this to say regarding the theme and the term itself, which was written on the teaser site: "'Violence' is not a word that sounds nice at all. Of course, it is loathed in society. However, there are people in this world that can't find something meaningful without violence. Those people, alongside the word 'violence' itself, come to be called the enemies of society." (Note: 決して美しい響きの言葉ではありません。もちろん社会的にも、忌み嫌われる言葉です。しかし世の中には、暴れることでしか、何かを見つけられない存在達が居ます。そして彼らはいつの間にか、暴力という言葉と共に、社会の敵と呼ばれるようになります)

== Plot ==
On September 22, 2010, street punk Tatsuya Ukyo attempts to rob Choraku, the front of the Chinese mafia while posing as a Tojo Clan enforcer, but accidentally kills a Tojo Clan yakuza, Naoki Toda of the Kuki Family, during his escape. He is caught and brought before Toda's patriarch, Ryutaro Kuki, who introduces him to Dragon Heat, an underground fighting circuit where spectators bet on the victor. Kuki gives Tatsuya an ultimatum: earn his freedom by winning ten consecutive matches there, or be handed over to the police for murder. With no alternative, Tatsuya enters Dragon Heat. Tatsuya tries to escape the Kuki Family, but is caught by them.

At the Dragon Heat, he meets Amamiya Taizan, the chiropractor of Dragon Heat's infirmary, & his assistant, Saki Kudo. He defeats Tomoki in his debut match. After the match, he meets Hyuga Sho, a star fighter in the Dragon Heat, who teases Tatsuya.

Tatsuya spectates Hyuga's match & later meets DJ Rikuoh, the ring announcer of the Dragon Heat, who takes Tatsuya to a cabaret club. He encounters Hyuga, who enrages Tatsuya. Kuki sets the match between Tatsuya & Hyuga the very next day. Tatsuya defeats Hyuga, who smiled at Tatsuya after being knocked out, showing his approval of Tatsuya. Taizan teaches Tatsuya of a fighter's philosophy.

The next day, Kuki gets a call & leaves while talking to Tatsuya about Shozo Takenaka, a youth division detective & Tatsuya's handler. He hangs out with Rikuoh, but leaves after spotting Takenaka. While fleeing, he encounters his teacher, Masumi Yuki, who had been beaten up by Tatsuya for calling the police while extorting money & bullying students back in high school. Tatsuya's third match has been set up against Yuki, who was a master in Aikido & Karate. After defeating Yuki, he tells Tatsuya the reason why he didn't fight back that day, as he lost his old job for slapping a student.

Tatsuya spots his friend, Sakaaki Tenma talking to Takenaka. While walking, Takenaka chases Tatsuya, but he flees in a taxi. Unbeknownst to him, the driver was Nobumichi Fujimoto, the father of Tsuneo Fujimoto, a student who was paralyzed after the fight with Tatsuya, leading to Tatsuya's arrest & expulsion from high school. He throws Tatsuya to a group of delinquents. One of them knew who paralyzed Tsuneo & Tatsuya chases him down. Tatsuya fights Fujimoto in the Dragon Heat & defeats him. Fujimoto learns the truth, as the real perpetrator was arrested & his son finally started to walk. Tatsuya's right ankle was injured during the battle. While walking, he sees Toda alive, but flees with Tenma after being spotted by Takenaka. Tatsuya splits up with Tenma, believing he ratted Tatsuya to the police.

Kozo Nioka, patriarch of the Nioka Family, issues a challenge for Tatsuya to fight against Hayato Makabe, in order to break Tatsuya's streak & take control of the Dragon Heat from Kuki. While searching for the truth of Toda being alive, he spots Tenma talking to a Nioka Family member, regarding Tatsuya's injured ankle as an advantage. Tatsuya defeats Makabe, who kicks the wrong ankle. The Nioka family beat up Tenma, but is saved by Tatsuya. Tenma reveals that he gave them misinformation as he wants to gain Tatsuya's trust & friendship back.

The police find Toda's body in the mountains. Angered, Tatsuya confronts Kuki, who denies that he murdered Toda for keeping Tatsuya in the Dragon Heat. Tatsuya meets the Florist of Sai, searching for Toda's murderer. He tells Tatsuya about a fighter who had a nine-win streak at the Dragon Heat & to meet a woman named Chiaki for information regarding Toda. She tells him that Toda was dealing with the Chinese & was trying not to give money to the Kuki Family. At the Dragon Heat, Tatsuya battles an enraged Hyuga. After defeating Hyuga, he angrily confronts Tatsuya in the Infirmary after the Nioka told him that Tatsuya kidnapped Chiaki, who is his sister, but was just a ruse to defeat Tatsuya.

Nioka tells Tatsuya that the next challenger is Cho Komei, the leader of the Lone Wolf Society. Tatsuya & Tenma try to find Takenaka, but spots him in Champion District with Cho, who was offering flowers for his deceased mother who died in an arson fire fifteen years ago. Cho tells Tatsuya that he must defeat him in order to get the identity of the arsonist. Tatsuya defeats Cho in the Dragon Heat & reconciles with Cho. Kuki was attacked by an unknown assailant, who frames Tatsuya by leaving his bracelet & a handkerchief.

The Kuki Family attack Tatsuya thinking that he attacked Kuki. Cho & Tatsuya finds a man who knew the owner of the building that was destroyed in the arson. Kuki calls Tatsuya to Choraku & tells him the truth of what happened that day. After Tatsuya's escape, Kuki had found Toda alive. The reason he forced Tatsuya to battle in the Dragon Heat was due to a wager made by Isamu Washio, a high ranking police officer, to reveal the traitor in the Tojo Clan who was informing about their illegal gambling dens. To do so, he has to represent a fighter who can win ten consecutive times. He also tells Tatsuya that Toda was involved in the arson, but recorded conversations in a memory card. Before revealing the location, Kuki dies. As Tatsuya leaves, he is kidnapped by a group of bikers who ask the location of the card, but is rescued by Cho. Tatsuya fights Tsuyoshi Aramaki, a mercenary hired by Washio, & defeats him.

Tatsuya breaks in Choraku, finding more info & finds a picture of a hostess, who works in a cabaret club in the Millennium Tower. He arrives at the tower entrance, but is intercepted by the Nioka Family, who forces him to fight Tetsuji Shima, a former boxing world champion. He entrusts Takenaka with the task of interrogating the hostess & also deduces that the traitor is Toru Nogi. After defeating Shima, he tells Tatsuya that the other person that defeated him previously was Nogi. Taizan's real identity (Nogi) was revealed by Shima. Nogi challenges Tatsuya for his tenth battle in the Dragon Heat, in exchange for the truth whether he killed Toda & Kuki, & whether he is responsible for the arson. Tatsuya defeats Nogi.

Tatsuya was about to beat down Nogi in anger but is stopped by his sister, Saeko, who reveals that Nogi is Tatsuya's biological father. She also tells him that they aren't biological siblings. Her parents were the owner of the building where Cho & Tatsuya's mothers used to work. Nogi, who was trying to enter the world of professional boxing to support his family, wasn't present during the time. Nogi took care of Saeko after the fire & left them in care with Tatsuya's mother's relatives. Nogi reveals that he made a deal with Takenaka to join the Tojo Clan & find the ones responsible, while being a police informant. Takenaka informs Tatsuya about the whereabouts of the card in the tower. Washio is killed & Takenaka is knocked out unconscious by the same assailant who killed Toda & Kuki. Tatsuya, Saki & Nogi go to the cabaret club in the tower & finds the card, which had the recordings of Toda & an unknown person. They are intercepted by Masatoyoshi Tsutsui, the true mastermind of the arson & his top assassin Reiji Shinjo. Tatsuya challenges Shinjo, who must defeat Tatsuya in order to get the card & kill the trio. Tatsuya & Shinjo battle on top of the tower & Tatsuya wins. Takenaka & the police arrive, but Nogi is fatally injured by Shinjo's toe kick while shielding Tatsuya. A dying Nogi apologises & tells Tatsuya to be strong.

Tsutsui & Shinjo were arrested, with Shinjo saying that he was forced by Tsutsui to murder. Takenaka says goodbye to Tatsuya, who wishes to be a great fighter. In the post credits scenes, Tadashi Tsurumi becomes the governor of Tokyo & he uses the same handkerchief that was used to frame Tatsuya, indicating he was deeply involved in this whole plot.

== Gameplay ==
The gameplay is focused on 1-on-1 brawling and martial arts, rather than the beat-em-up gameplay of the main Yakuza series. The combat is modeled after Def Jam: Fight for NY, made by AKI Corporation (now syn Sophia), combined with elements of the main series' titles such as heat actions, overworld enemy encounters, and picking up weapons scattered around the arena. The 3D rendered gameplay uses the same kind of fixed camera system as in the first two Yakuza games on the PlayStation 2.

== Content ==
Though on PSP, the game has similar mini-games to the main series, such as bowling, claw machines, and a batting center. Hostess clubs feature an interaction for a Kiss, which depends on how highly hearted the hostess is. Part-time jobs have been added for gaining money, as it is purposefully scarce in the game compared to other franchise titles.

== Communication mode ==
As part of the game's multiplayer mode, a custom character is required to play online. This mode consists of missions to unlock items for character customization, and can be played either solo or cooperatively with another player. A standard VS mode can also be played among other players and teams. Fighting styles and stats are carried over from offline mode, and are based on the player's progress in the game.

== TV drama ==
A television series based on the game began airing on TBS on October 5, 2010 and ended after 11 episodes. The series spawned a sequel in 2012 based on the game's sequel, the series also ran for 11 episodes.

== Sequel ==
Kurohyō 2: Ryū ga Gotoku Ashura Hen being advertised at the Shinjuku Don Quijote store, a virtual version of which appears in the game

A sequel, Kurohyō 2: Ryū ga Gotoku Ashura Hen (Japanese: クロヒョウ2 龍が如く 阿修羅編; lit. "Black Panther 2: Like a Dragon Ashura Chapter") was introduced for PSP by Ryū ga Gotoku series creator Toshihiro Nagoshi in Weekly Famitsu and released in Japan on March 22, 2012.

== Legacy ==
Although the game, along with its sequel, is one of the few entries in the Yakuza series which has never received an international release, interest from fans has led to the development of fan translations for both games.
