= Kento Kaku =

Japanese actor (born 1989)

- 賀来 賢人
- Born: 3 July 1989 (age 37); Tokyo, Japan
- Citizenship: Japan
- Occupations: Actor; producer
- Years active: 2006–present
- Agent: Amuse, Inc.
- Notable work: From Today, It's My Turn!!
- Spouse: Nana Eikura (m. 2016)
- Children: 2
- Relatives: Chikako Kaku (aunt)
- Website: Official website

Kento Kaku (賀来 賢人, Kaku Kento; born 3 July 1989) is a Japanese actor born in Tokyo. He has appeared in a number of feature films, television series, and stage productions. His wife is actress Nana Eikura.

== Early life ==
Kaku was born on July 3, 1989 as the youngest of two sons. He attended Gyosei Junior and Senior High School before dropping out of Aoyama Gakuin University's School of Business.

During his high school years, he was devoted to the basketball club. Around the time he retired from club activities, he told his family about being scouted by a talent agency. Coincidentally, an employee from his current agency saw a family photo of the Kaku family and passed on a business card with a message: "Please tell this person (Kento) to contact me." Kaku, who was already interested in acting because he enjoyed watching dramas, contacted the agency himself and signed with them, thus beginning his entertainment career.

== Career ==
He made his acting debut in films in 2007. In 2009, he had his first lead role in the film Giniro no Ame. In 2012, he starred in the television drama Clover. He played the hero, Hanako's brother Kichitaro Ando in the Asadora Hanako to Anne broadcast in the first half of 2014. He later played in the 2015 Taiga drama Hana Moyu as Shinsengumi Okita Sōji.

In April 2015, he was appointed a New Caledonia Tourism Goodwill Ambassador.

Kaku's career took off from 2018 onwards, getting cast in leading roles for several series, resulted in his winning of the 2019 GQ Japan's Men of the Year Awards for Breakthrough Actor.

On September 1, 2022, he announced that he had ended his exclusive contract with Amuse Inc.—the agency he had been with for approximately 16 years—and would become independent.

On April 3, 2024, he reported on his Instagram that he had established the video production company "SIGNAL181" in collaboration with Dave Boyle, the director of House of Ninjas, a series which he starred in and wrote the original story for.

== Personal life ==
On 7 August 2016, he announced that he had married actress Nana Eikura whom he co-starred with in TV drama Testimony of N. They have two children.

== Filmography ==
=== Television dramas ===
Dates	Title	Role	Notes	Ref.
2011	Ranma ½	Ranma Saotome (male)	Television film	
2012	Clover	Hayabusato Misaki	Lead role	
2014	Hanako and Anne	Kichitaro Ando	Asadora	
2014	Testimony of N	Nozomi Ando		
2015	Burning Flower	Okita Sōji	Taiga drama	
2016	Double Duty	Mikio Kobayashi		
2017	Super Salaryman Mr. Saenai	Ikesugi		
2017	Akira and Akira	Ryuma Kaido		
2017	My Lover's Secret	Akito Tachibana		
2017	Wani tokage gisu	Tadashi Hayashi		
2018	Princess Jellyfish	Kai Fish		
2018	From Today, It's My Turn!!	Takashi Mitsuhashi	Lead role	
2019	Afro Tanaka	Hiroshi Tanaka	Lead role	
2019	Nippon Noir	Kiyoharu Yusa	Lead role	
2020	Hanzawa Naoki	Masahiro Moriyama		
2020	Daddy is My Classmate		Cameo	
2021	Tokyo MER: Mobile Emergency Room	Nao Otowa		
2024	House of Ninjas	Haru Tawara	Lead role	
2024	Like a Dragon: Yakuza	Akira Nishikiyama		
2025	Alice in Borderland	Ryuji	Season 3	
2026	Human Vapor	Kenta		
2026	Did Someone Happen to Mention Me?	Tetsu Okamoto		

=== Film ===
Date	Title	Role	Notes	Ref.
2007	Shindō	Kenji Shimizu		
2007	Little DJ	Shuhei Yuki		
2008	700 Days of Battle: Us vs. the Police	Great Inoue		
2009	Giniro no Ame	Kazuya Hirai	Lead role	
2013	I'll Give It My All... Tomorrow	Real store manager		
2016	Moriyamachu Driving School	Todoroki	Lead role	
2017	The Disastrous Life of Saiki K.	Aren Kuboyaasu		
2018	Chihayafuru Part 3	Hisashi Suo		
2019	The Bucket List	Teruo Miki		
2020	AI Amok	Satoru Nishimura		
2020	Wotakoi: Love Is Hard for Otaku	Shinji Sakamoto		
2020	From Today, It's My Turn!! The Movie	Takashi Mitsuhashi	Lead role	
2020	The Untold Tale of the Three Kingdoms	Zhou Yu		
2023	Gold Kingdom and Water Kingdom	Naranbayar (voice)	Lead role	
2023	Tokyo MER: Mobile Emergency Room – The Movie	Nao Otowa		
2023	Spy × Family Code: White	Luka (voice)		
2024	Midnight	Midnight	Lead role; short film	
2024	Saint Young Men: The Movie	Brahmā		
2025	Tokyo MER: Mobile Emergency Room – Nankai Mission	Nao Otowa		
2025	Crayon Shin-chan the Movie: Super Hot! The Spicy Kasukabe Dancers	Wolf (voice)		
2025	New Interpretation of the End of Edo Period	Gotō Shōjirō		
2026	Never After Dark		Also producer	
2026	Tokyo MER: Mobile Emergency Room – Capital Crisis	Nao Otowa		

=== Dubbing ===
Date	Title	Role	Notes	Ref.
2019	The Lion King	Simba	Lead role	

=== Stage ===
Dates	Title	Role	Locations	Notes	Ref.
Aug–Sep 2017	Young Frankenstein	Igor	Tokyo International Forum Hall C, Orix Theater		
8–27 Dec 2017	M&O plays Produce Nagareyama Bluebird		Honda Theater		

== Commercials ==
- Asics Corporation
  - Asics (2010)
- Benesse
  - Shinken Seminar High School Course (2006)
- Central Japan Railway Company
  - Tokyo Bookmark (image character)(2015)
- Nintendo Co., Ltd.
  - Nintendo 3DS Pro Evolution Soccer 6 (2006)
- NTT, Inc. NTT Docomo
  - Ahamo (2026–) with Arashi's Kazunari Ninomiya
  - Docomo Style series "Style Iluminations" (2009) with Maki Horikita
- Otsuka Pharmaceutical
  - Pocari Sweat Pocari Sweat Ion Water (2015)
- Rohto Pharmaceutical
  - Rohto Rise eye drops (2008)
- Shinto Holdings Co., Ltd.
  - Russ-K (image character) (2010)
- Tokyu Group SHIBUYA109
  - 109men (brand model) (2013)

== Awards and nominations ==
Year	Award	Category	Work(s)	Result	Ref.
2021	45th Elan d'or Awards	Newcomer of the Year	Himself	Won	
