= Masayoshi Yokoyama =

Japanese video game director

- 横山 昌義
- Born: June 30, 1976 (age 50); Kanagawa Prefecture, Japan
- Education: Tokai University
- Occupations: Game director; game producer; game designer; writer
- Employer: Sega (1999–present)
- Known for: Yakuza series Jet Set Radio series
- Title: Head of RGG Studio

Masayoshi Yokoyama (横山 昌義 Yokoyama Masayoshi, born June 30, 1976) is a Japanese game producer, director and writer for Sega, more specifically Ryu Ga Gotoku Studio, a studio within Sega Development Division 1, where he's been the head of the division and studio since 2021. He is mainly known for his work on the Yakuza series, where he has been working since the very beginning as a writer, and later on as a producer.

== Career ==
Yokoyama studied marketing and applied to various jobs as a planner, not knowing what it really meant. He was open to entering any industry as a planner, be it a wedding planner or financial planner. He then realized that the games industry, specifically in Japan, also had planner positions. In the end, he chose Sega because it seemed the most interesting to him, due to being asked very different questions during the interview process than other companies at the time. Due to his father managing a toy store, he knew the name Sega and was surrounded by games, but was actually more of the athletic type, and never thought he would join the game industry.

His first title since joining the workforce was Jet Set Radio where he did "menial tasks" and "everything he could" such as level design, voice recordings and enemy placement. His level design work was influenced by Excitebike on the NES. Later on, he became a key developer for the Yakuza franchise. He once again did multiple jobs, including writing, sound and stage direction and, since Yakuza 5, also producing. For the Like a Dragon series, the greatest influence is Oishinbo, since he has read that manga over and over again since childhood. Working on the Yakuza series gave him pride as a creator, as before, he has worked on games that some people thought were interesting but did not do great business wise.

In October 2021, after Yakuza series creator Toshihiro Nagoshi left Sega and Ryu Ga Gotoku Studio to join NetEase and establish his own studio, Yokoyama took over and became the new head of Ryu Ga Gotoku Studio after over a decade working in the series and studio.

=== Writing style ===
Reflecting on his younger days, he always enjoyed bombastic scenes that left an impact. One of his favourite films is A Better Tomorrow, where he was particularly impressed by its opening and cool scenes. During a school assignment to make a puppet show for a festival, he actually lit things on fire, which upset the school but made the audience really excited, he says he still creates things the same way today. To him, the ending is not the most important part, he does not plan the final culprit for each game until the very end, with a focus on who would be most fun to fight for a final boss. His inspirations are not novels, but various TV shows and movies. To construct the plot, he draws up a character correlation chart similar to a J-Drama. This stopped with Yakuza 5. Yakuza 4 was the first game where he wrote multiple protagonists, and he enjoyed pulling inspirations such as Ryo Saeba from City Hunter for Shun Akiyama and screenwriter Kankuro Kudo for Taiga Saejima. To a certain degree, he feels that the Like a Dragon series is a fantasy world with realism that allows for debates, such as if Kazuma Kiryu is still a virgin or not. Yokoyama probably thinks that he is, and he is sure that cases can be made against this opinion. According to him, one of the qualities of Like a Dragon is allowing for silly discussions like this. As he got promoted to producer, he was allowed for theming of each game to be consistent in marketing, main story and substories, such as was the case for Yakuza 0, where the main themes he came up with were: "women, violence, money". Yokoyama has received praise for his work, particularly during fan events, he received ten times as much criticism online. But he is grateful that fans play all the way to the end, and it inspires him to do better.

== Works ==
Year	Title	Role
2000	Jet Set Radio	Senior game designer
2002	Jet Set Radio Future	Chief game designer
2004	Ollie King	Director
2005	Yakuza	Scriptwriter
2006	Sonic Riders	Development support
2006	Yakuza 2	Scriptwriter
2008	Ryū ga Gotoku Kenzan!	Scriptwriter, original concept
2009	Yakuza 3	Scriptwriter
2010	Yakuza 4	Scriptwriter
2012	Yakuza 5	Director, producer, scriptwriter
2014	Like a Dragon: Ishin!	Producer, storyboard, scriptwriter
2015	Yakuza 0	Chief producer, storyboard, scriptwriter
2016	Yakuza Kiwami	Chief producer, storyboard, scriptwriter
2016	Yakuza 6: The Song of Life	Chief producer, scriptwriter, series planner
2017	Yakuza Kiwami 2	Chief producer, storyboard, scriptwriter
2018	Ryu Ga Gotoku Online	Scenario supervisor
2018	Fist of the North Star: Lost Paradise	Chief producer, storyboard, scriptwriter
2020	Yakuza: Like a Dragon	Chief producer, storyboard, scriptwriter
2021	Lost Judgment	Production cooperation
2023	Like a Dragon Gaiden: The Man Who Erased His Name	Executive director, story, overall scene direction
2024	Like a Dragon: Infinite Wealth	Executive director, original story, total direction
2024	Super Monkey Ball Banana Rumble	Executive management
2025	Like a Dragon: Pirate Yakuza in Hawaii	Executive director, original story, total direction
2025	Yakuza 0 Director's Cut	Executive director
2026	Yakuza Kiwami 3 & Dark Ties	Executive director, original story, total direction
2027	Stranger Than Heaven	Executive director
