= Like a Dragon (film) =

2007 film by Takashi Miike

Yakuza: Like a Dragon
- Theatrical release poster
- Directed by: Takashi Miike
- Written by: Masashi Sogo
- Based on: Yakuza by Sega
- Produced by: Tsutomu Tsuchikawa; Shigeji Maeda
- Starring: Kazuki Kitamura; Gorô Kishitani; Show Aikawa; Yoshiyoshi Arakawa; Kenichi Endō; Tomorowo Taguchi
- Cinematography: Hideo Yamamoto
- Edited by: Yasushi Shimamura
- Music by: Koji Endo
- Production companies: ArtPort; Sega; Toei; CJ Entertainment
- Distributed by: Toei (Japan); Sega Sammy (South Korea)
- Release date: 3 March 2007 (Japan)
- Running time: 110 minutes
- Countries: Japan; South Korea
- Languages: Japanese; Korean
- Box office: $5,215,613

Yakuza: Like a Dragon (Japanese: 龍が如く 劇場版, Hepburn: Ryū ga Gotoku: Gekijōban; lit. "Like a Dragon: The Movie") is a 2007 crime film directed by Takashi Miike, based on the video game series published by Sega. It features an ensemble cast led by Kazuki Kitamura as protagonist Kazuma Kiryu, along with Gorô Kishitani, Show Aikawa, Shun Shioya, Saeko, Saki Takaoka, Gong Yoo, Yutaka Matsushige, Claude Maki, Yoshiyoshi Arakawa, Kenichi Endō and Tomorowo Taguchi. Series creator Toshihiro Nagoshi (billed as 'Mister N') appears in a supporting role.

Like a Dragon broadly adapts the plot of the first game in the series, following several different storylines that unfolds in a hot summer night in Kamurochō, the franchise's fictionalized version of Tokyo Shinjuku's Kabukichō.

The film was released in Japan by Toei Company on March 3, 2007, to mixed reviews. The English-subtitled version premiered on June 23, 2008, at New York Asian Film Festival, and was released on DVD in North America on February 23, 2010, by an affiliate of Media Blasters.

== Plot ==
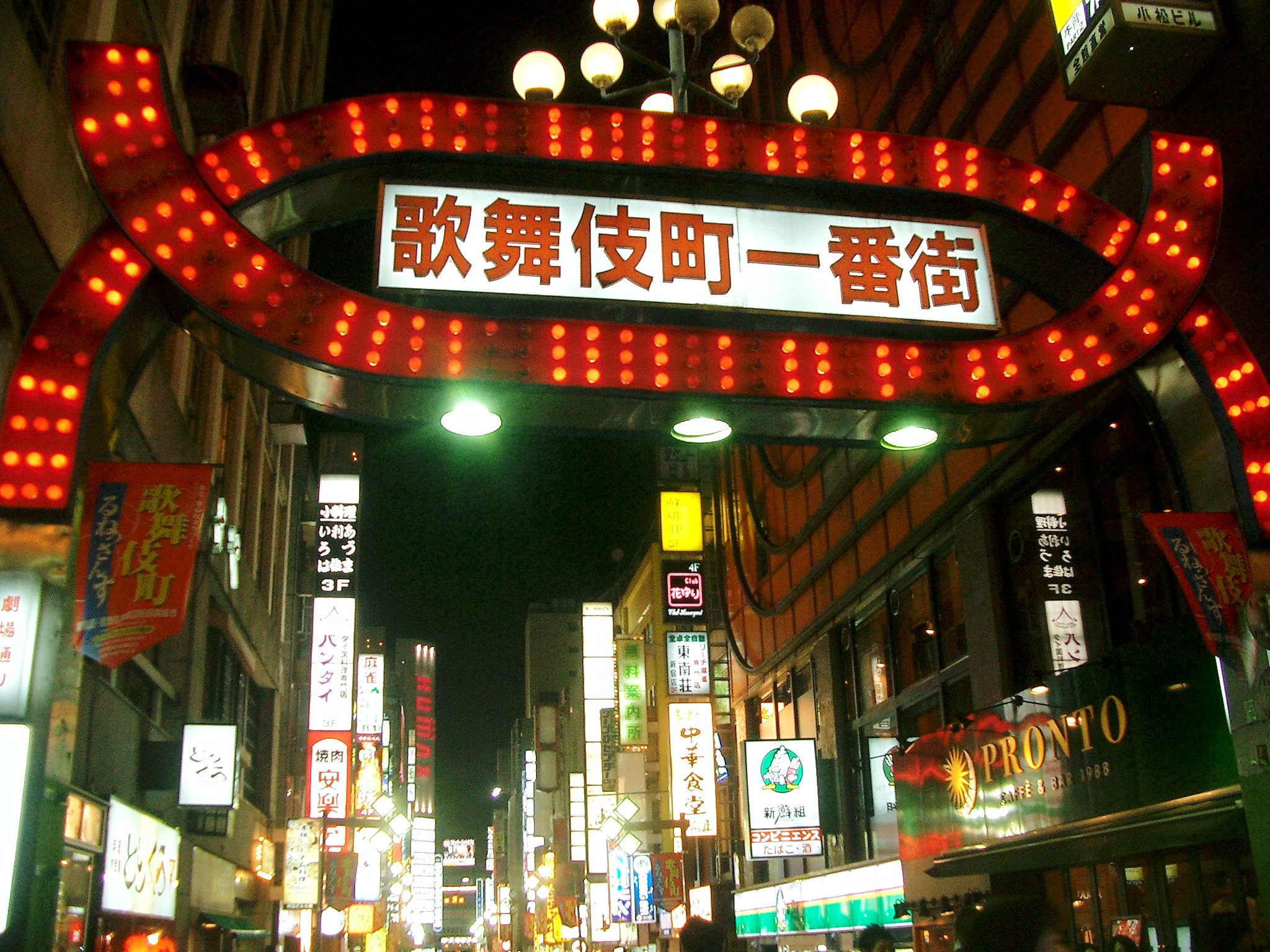
The movie was shot on location in Tokyo's Kabukicho district which itself served as a basis for the background design of the game's Kamurocho area.

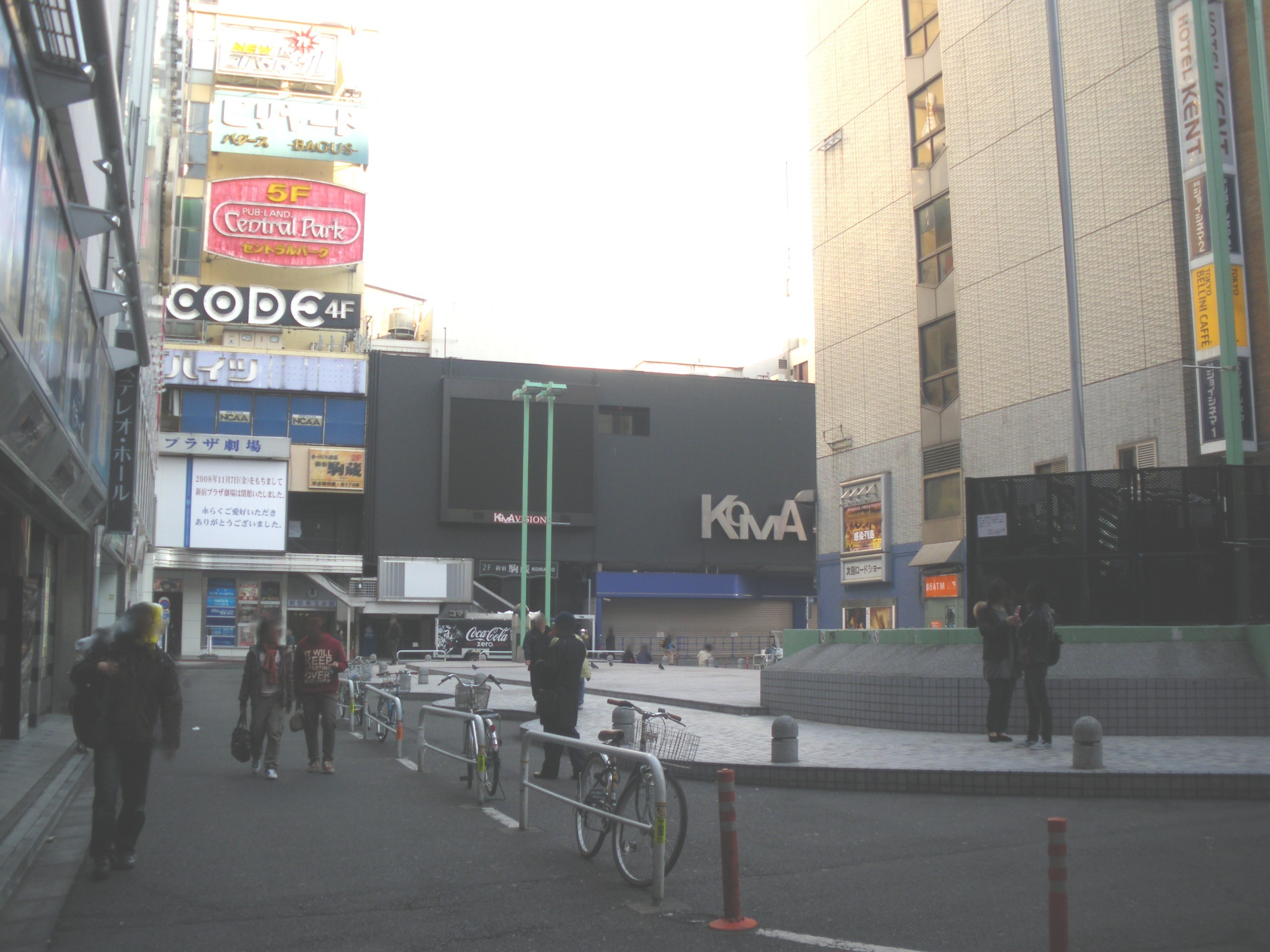
The Shinjuku Koma Theater, a main landmark in both the games and the movie version

On a hot summer night in Kamurocho, a manzai duo of amateur masked gunmen lay siege to a bank, while 10 billion yen belonging to the Tojo Clan, a powerful yakuza syndicate, disappear. Meanwhile, in the streets of Kamurocho, former yakuza Kazuma Kiryu and his adopted daughter, a young girl called Haruka Sawamura, search for Mizuki Sawamura, the latter's mother and the sister of Kiryu's childhood love, with Kiryu's old rival, the psychotic yakuza Goro Majima, and his men following them.

Kiryu is attacked by members of the Nishikiyama family in a convenience store called Sancho, where Poppo employee Satoru and his new girlfriend Yui take advantage of the confusion to empty the cash register, and decide to start holding up stores for money and for fun.

Elsewhere in the district, a mysterious Korean hitman, Park, tracks down the culprit behind the Tojo Clan heist, which leads him towards the infamous Jingu, a figure also known as Mister N, and the Kamurocho landmark, the Millennium Tower.

The search for Mizuki brings Kiryu to the top of Millennium Tower and ends with a climactic battle against yakuza Akira Nishikiyama, Kiryu's childhood best friend and former blood brother, who declares his intention to beat Kiryu and finally prove he is the better man and after an intense fight, Mizuki detonates the entire tower in an attempt to kill Jingu and scattering the Tojo clan's entire funds across Kabukicho before telling Kiryu to take Haruka and run. All plots resolve in the climactic finish, including Mizuki sacrificing herself and Majima escaping to live another day while Satoru carries a mortally wounded Yui across the streets after a scuffle with another Yakuza clan. Park bids farewell to his sponsors after successfully assassinating Mister N and departs for Korea, while the masked gun men are finally arrested. Amidst the rubble of the Millennium Tower, Haruka, realizing she has no other family left, holds Kiryu's hand and asks to be adopted.

== Cast ==
- Kazuki Kitamura as Kazuma Kiryu (Japanese: 桐生 一馬)
- Natsuo as Haruka Sawamura (澤村遥)
- Gorô Kishitani as Goro Majima (真島吾朗)
- Shun Shioya as Satoru (悟)
- Saeko as Yui (唯)
- Haruhiko Kato as Kazuki (一輝)
- Saki Takaoka as Yumi Sawamura (澤村由美) / Mizuki Sawamura (美月)
- Show Aikawa as Detective Noguchi (野口刑事)
- Gong Yoo as Park Cheol (Korean: 박철)
- Yutaka Matsushige as Makoto Date (伊達真)
- Claude Maki as Akira Nishikiyama (錦山彰)
- Yoshiyoshi Arakawa as the arms dealer (武器屋)
- Kenichi Endō as Imanishi (今西)
- Tsuyoshi Muro as Nakanishi (中西)
- Sansei Shiomi as Shintaro Kazama (風間新太郎)
- Tomorowo Taguchi as the barbershop owner
- Toshihiro Nagoshi (credited as 'Mister N') as Kyohei Jingu (神宮 京平)
- Alexander Otsuka as a yakuza

== Release ==
=== Home media ===
Amuse Soft Entertainment released the regular DVD edition on September 28, 2007, in Japan, with a limited edition "Deluxe Box" featuring three Kubrick figures (Majima, Kiryu and Haruka).

American distributor Tokyo Shock released a licensed DVD titled Yakuza: Like a Dragon on February 23, 2010. While originally planned for March, the release date was moved to coincide with the North American localization of Yakuza 3.

Prior to this official release, an English-subtitled DVD was distributed in North America by Bonzai RCS; its case featured a Korean cover for some reason (it was likely an unlicensed product); it was similar to the Korean market edition by CJ Entertainment.

== Soundtrack ==
The motion picture soundtrack features three songs by Crazy Ken Band from his 2006 album Galaxy released on the Almond Eyes label (XNAE-10010), these are Hama no Ambassador (ハマのアンバサダー, hama no anbasada, lit. "ambassador of Yokohama") featuring Fire Ball and Papa B., Kuroi Kizuato no Blues (黒い傷跡のブルース, kuroi kizuato no burusu, lit. "black scar blues") and the ending theme 12 gatsu 17 nichi (12月17日, lit. "December 17th"). The latter two are also included in the Yakuza 2 game's soundtrack.

== Reception ==
The film received mixed reviews from critics. Kotaku called the film "an excellent black comedy", although it criticized the deviations from the game's lore and the last 15 minutes. In contrast, Screen Rant called the film, "one of the most bizarre video game adaptations" and noted the title duplication with a later game in the series.

== See also ==
- List of films based on video games
