= You Don't Know Jack =

You Don't Know Jack, derived from the phrase "you don't know jack shit", may refer to:

- You Don't Know Jack (franchise), a media franchise based on the trivia video game introduced in 1995
  - You Don't Know Jack (1995 video game), the first title in the series
  - You Don't Know Jack (game show), a 2001 televised game show based on the game
  - You Don't Know Jack (2011 video game), a 2011 game in the series
  - You Don't Know Jack (Facebook game), a Facebook derivative that was released in 2012
  - You Don't Know Jack: Full Stream, a stream-friendly sequel found in the Jackbox Party Pack 5
- You Don't Know Jack (film), a 2010 film about Jack Kevorkian, an American doctor known for a number of assisted suicides
- "You Don't Know Jack", a song by country music artist Luke Bryan
- You Don't Know Jack (Grimm), an episode of the television series Grimm
