= Smart Games Challenge =

American video game series

- Cover art for the first game in the series.
- Genre: Minigame
- Developers: KnowWare, Smart Games
- First release: Smart Games Challenge; 1996
- Latest release: Smart Games Challenge 3; 1998

Smart Games Challenge is a video game series developed by American companies KnowWare and Smart Games. Three games were released between 1996 and 1998.

== Gameplay ==
Each game consists of a series of minigames, designed to improve cognitive function.

== Reception ==
=== Smart Games Challenge ===
Smart Games Challenge was a commercial success, with 300,000 copies sold by early 1998.

Smart Games Challenge was a finalist for the Computer Game Developers Conference's 1996 "Best Trivia or Puzzle Game" Spotlight Award, but lost the prize to You Don't Know Jack XL. It was also the runner-up for Computer Gaming World's 1996 "Classic/Puzzle Game of the Year" award, which ultimately went to Baku Baku Animal. The editors called Smart Games Challenge "an inspired collection of every brain teaser imaginable", and a game that "promises puzzle fans an excellent mental work-out." However, it won the Codie award for "Best Debut of the Year".

PC Game World gave it 68%. World Village gave it 3/5.

=== Smart Games Puzzle Challenge 2 ===
Reception

Review scores
Publication	Score
Computer Gaming World	5/5
PC Gamer (US)	80%
Computer Games Strategy Plus	4.5/5

In Computer Gaming World, Charles Ardai called Smart Games Puzzle Challenge 2 "brain food of a very high order, caviar for the cranium." He summarized it as "the best bunch of brain-busters ever." Cindy Yans of Computer Games Strategy Plus wrote, "This is simply the most comprehensive puzzle game around. Hands down."

Writing for PC Gamer US, Lisa H. Renninger called it "one of the best puzzle collections we’ve seen in a long time", and a vast improvement over its predecessor. She highlighted its "terrific gameplay" and "great puzzle variety".

The editors of Computer Gaming World named Smart Games Puzzle Challenge 2 the best puzzle game of 1997, and wrote, "Once again, Smart Games goes for substance rather than flash. But with brain-shattering puzzles like these, who needs fluff?"

PC Game World gave the game an 80% score.

=== Smart Games Puzzle Challenge 3 ===
Reception

Review scores
Publication	Score
Computer Gaming World	4/5
GameSpot	7.2/10

In Computer Gaming World, Charles Ardai wrote of Puzzle Challenge 3, "Almost three years after they set the puzzle game standard, the folks at Smart Games are still the only ones doing it right." Although he felt that the designers had been forced to rely on "sometimes esoteric" puzzles, since their earlier titles included most of the accessible ones, he argued that "no puzzle lover will leave disappointed." Ardai concluded, "Unlike most series, which tend to start running out of steam by their third installment, Smart Games' Puzzle Challenge still has all of its original spirit and most of its creative spark."

Puzzle Challenge 3 was a finalist for Computer Gaming World's award for the best classic game of 1998, although it lost to You Don't Know Jack: The Ride.

GameSpot gave it 7.2/10. Gaming Entertainment Magazine gave it 70%.
