= Who Wants to Be a Millionaire (1999 video game) =

1999 video game

- Developer: Jellyvision
- Publisher: Disney Interactive
- Composers: Keith Strachan; Matthew Strachan
- Platform: Microsoft Windows
- Release: NA: November 23, 1999
- Genres: Quiz, party
- Modes: Single-player, multiplayer

Who Wants to Be a Millionaire is a 1999 quiz/party video game originally developed by Jellyvision and published by Disney Interactive, based on the television franchise of the same name. The game was based on the American version of the show. It tasks the player with answering quiz questions in a limited time frame.

== Gameplay ==
Who Wants to Be a Millionaire is a quiz/party video game in which the player answers quiz questions in a limited time frame.

== Development ==
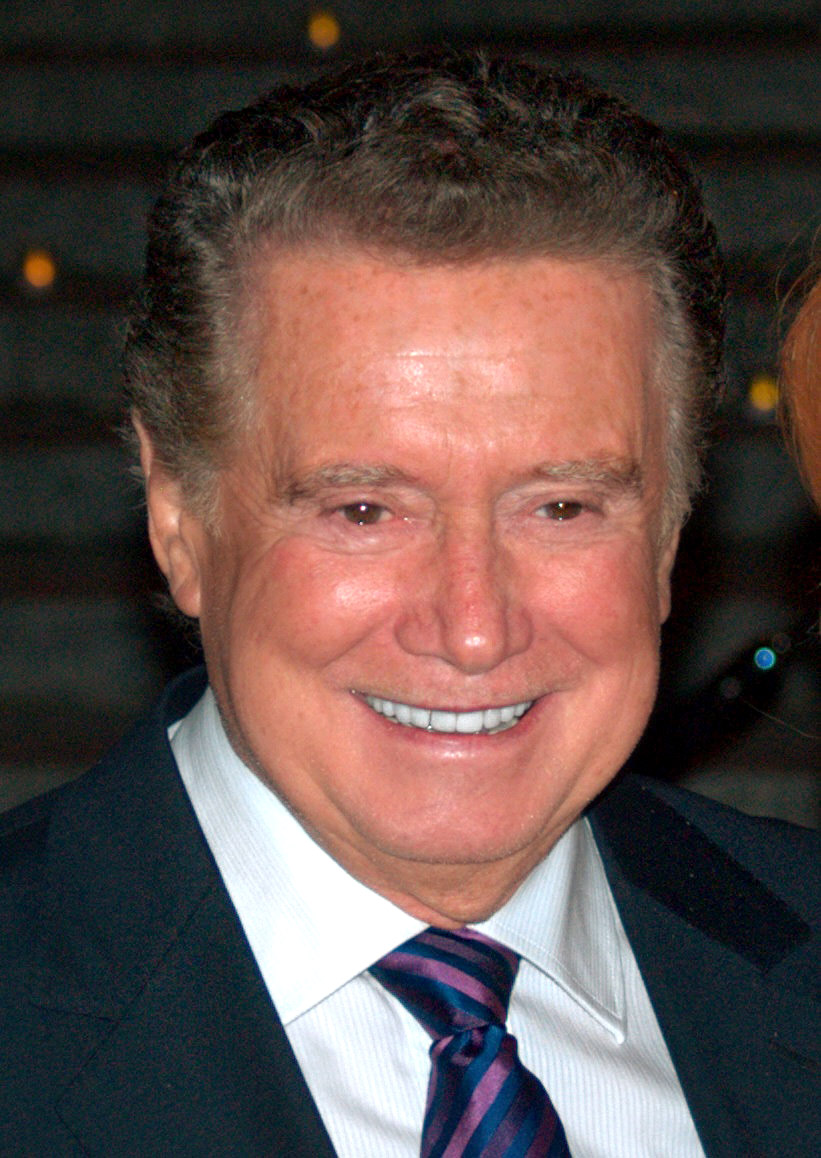
Regis Philbin lent his appearance and voice to the developers of Who Wants to Be a Millionaire.

Who Wants to Be a Millionaire was developed by Jellyvision, which had previously co-created the successful You Don't Know Jack trivia game series with Berkeley Systems.

== Reception ==
Reception

Review scores
Publication	Score
Computer Gaming World	2.5/5
GameSpot	6.2/10
IGN	6.2/10
PC Gamer (US)	78%

=== Sales ===
Who Wants to Be a Millionaire was a commercial blockbuster. In the United States, it debuted at #2 on PC Data's list of the best-selling computer games for the week of November 21, at an average retail price of $20. Disney Interactive reported that the game "virtually sold out across the country" by Thanksgiving, the day after its release. Rising to first place on PC Data's charts in its second week, it proceeded to hold a four-week streak at #1 through November 28–December 25. By December 19, it had shipped 1 million units to retailers. At the time, Amer Ajami of GameSpot theorized that the game's "US$19 price tag has to be one of the reasons" for its success. It dropped to position 2 during the final week of 1999, behind RollerCoaster Tycoon. Following a 15th-place finish for the month of November, Millionaire claimed first place for December overall.

According to PC Data, Who Wants to Be a Millionaire's sell-through reached 592,655 units and its revenues $11.4 million in the United States by the end of 1999. This made it the region's fastest-selling, third-highest-selling and seventh-highest-grossing computer game of the year. A writer for PC Gamer US called the game's sales "scary" given its late-year launch, and predicted that its "full potential" was not yet realized. GameSpot's Steve Smith remarked of Millionaire's performance, "Most hard-core gamers probably gnash their teeth at the thought of Regis Philbin and his simple-minded trivia game outselling every other supposedly respectable game on the market."

Sales continued in 2000. PC Data ultimately ranked Who Wants to Be a Millionaire as the United States' fourth-largest computer game hit of 2000, with 942,978 units sold and $15.67 million revenues earned.

By April 24, 2001, the game sold 4 million units.

== International versions ==
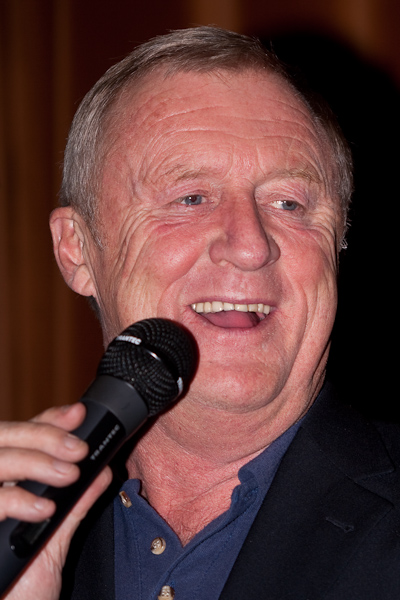
Chris Tarrant in 2009

Chris Tarrant and Günther Jauch appeared in the British and German versions of Who Wants to Be a Millionaire, respectively.

In 2000, a completely separate title from the Disney version was developed by Hothouse Creations and published by Eidos Interactive for Windows, PlayStation and Dreamcast entitled Who Wants to Be a Millionaire? These versions were based on the British and German versions of the show.

The United Kingdom edition of Who Wants to Be a Millionaire proved to be a massive hit for Eidos Interactive. After four months on shelves, it became the first game developed in Britain to reach domestic sales of 1 million units, according to Chart-Track. This made it the United Kingdom's best-selling game of 2000. Its million sales amounted to 347,000 units of its computer version, 39,000 Dreamcast units and 624,000 PlayStation units. By 2016, Who Wants to Be a Millionaire still held the record for the longest streak at #1 in the United Kingdom, with 18 consecutive weeks.

In the German market, Eidos Interactive released Who Wants to Be a Millionaire (known as Wer wird Millionär) during the middle of December 2000. It became an instant hit and, within two weeks of release, among the region's best-selling games of the year. Andreas Philipp of Gameswelt noted that it "immediately made it to No. 1 on the Media Control Charts" and remained there by January of the following year. While it dropped to second place on the monthly charts for February and March, by October it had maintained a 10-month streak on Media Control's rankings. It secured 13th that month.

Who Wants to Be a Millionaire's computer version quickly received a "Gold" sales award from the Verband der Unterhaltungssoftware Deutschland (VUD), indicating sales of at least 100,000 units across Germany, Austria and Switzerland. It rose to "Platinum" status, for 200,000 sales, after less than a month on shelves. In March 2001 the VUD awarded the computer version of Who Wants to Be a Millionaire its "Double-Platinum" prize, for sales of 400,000 copies, while its PlayStation release collected a "Gold" honor. The committee remarked that it was a "game that cannot be classified in the common genres, but has become a complete success."

== Sequels ==
The game was followed by a number of sequels, beginning with Who Wants to Be a Millionaire: 2nd Edition, another commercial hit.
