= The Jackbox Party Pack =

Video game series

- Genre: Party
- Developer: Jackbox Games
- Publishers: Jackbox Games; Telltale Publishing (The Jackbox Party Pack only)
- Platforms: Android (selected systems), Apple TV, Google Stadia, Linux, macOS, Windows, Nintendo Switch, PlayStation 3, PlayStation 4, PlayStation 5, Xbox 360, Xbox One, Xbox Series X/S, Netflix
- First release: The Jackbox Party Pack; November 26, 2014
- Latest release: The Jackbox Party Pack 12; October 15, 2026

The Jackbox Party Pack is a series of party video games developed by Jackbox Games for many different platforms on a near-annual release schedule since 2014. The main series are released on an annual basis, each containing five games that are designed to be played in groups of varying sizes using their own personal devices like smartphones and tablets, working in conjunction with streaming services like Twitch which provide means for audiences to participate. As of 2026, twelve main packs have been released.

== History ==
Jellyvision had been well-established for its You Don't Know Jack series of "irreverent trivia" games. Though the series had been successful in the late 1990s, Jellyvision had not been able to make the transition easily from computer to home console games, and by 2001, all but six employees of Jellyvision had been laid off. The company focused on developing business solution software, specifically offering software to its clients to help assist their customers for complex forms or other types of support.

By 2008, Jellyvision, now named The Jellyvision Lab, saw that mobile gaming was booming, so it created a small subsidiary, Jellyvision Games, to rework You Don't Know Jack, first for consoles in its 2011 version, then for mobile and Facebook users with the now-defunct 2012 iteration. This last version was a critical success, and led the studio to focus on developing similar games, rebranding the studio by 2013 as Jackbox Games.

Among its one-off games include Lie Swatter, Clone Booth, and Word Puttz, generally designed as single-player games or played asynchronously with other players. One key game that followed this was its 2014 game Fibbage, which allows up to eight simultaneous players, one of whom can use live streaming or play with people in the same room. Other players would participate by using a web browser or mobile device to connect to the streaming player's game through Jackbox's servers and which to provide their answers.

With the success of Fibbage, Jackbox Games decided that they could offer these games in packs, reworking older games to use the streaming capabilities and adding in new games. This formed the basis of The Jackbox Party Pack, with the first pack released in 2014 including updated versions of You Don't Know Jack, Fibbage, a reworked version of Lie Swatter for its multiplayer approach, and two new games. The company saw this as a new development model that allowed them to provide new packs on an annual basis, play around with different game formats, and provide higher value to consumers over one-off games.

Subsequent Jackbox Party Packs have included improvements of existing games, support for more players including the addition of audience participation through the same connectivity approach, better support for content management for streams (as to remove offensive terms in responses, for example), and the ability to create custom games. A key part of Party Pack games is to streamline the ability for players to get into games, and according to Jackbox Games' CEO Mike Bilder, they spent about a year working on building their servers and software to provide a flexible architecture for the player-side mobile and web interface to expand for any of the games, and to avoid having players download any type of app to get started.

According to Allard Laban, creative chief for both Jellyvision Labs and Jackbox Games, they select games to include in the packs through a combination of allowing the team to submit fleshed-out ideas, and through testing various ideas through pen-and-paper trials; Laban stated that for Party Pack 4, they had over fifty play-tested concepts which they narrowed down to four new games, rounding out the package with an improved version of Fibbage. Some games, such as Fakin' It, took multiple years to get the right gameplay and mechanics down to make it an appropriate game for inclusion.

The first six Jackbox Party Packs gained renewed attention during the COVID-19 pandemic as a way for many people to keep up social interactions while maintaining social distancing. Starting on May 1, 2020, Jackbox ran ten special Celebrity Jackbox live streams to support COVID-19 charities, with the celebrities playing various Jackbox Party Pack games alongside audience viewers. Jackbox said that its playerbase doubled from 100 million players in 2019 to 200 million by October 2020 due to society's shutdown. Jackbox Games improved server capacity and streaming service usability, and internationalized a standalone version of Quiplash 2 for French, German, Italian, and Spanish languages.

Jackbox released a Twitch extension for streamers in December 2020 which allows viewers of their channel to directly participate in Jackbox games from the Twitch interface.

Creative director for Jackbox, Brooke Breit, said in March 2024 that Jackbox was taking a break from the Party Pack model in 2024, though have other games still in the works.

== Gameplay ==
An example game screen from Quiplash 2 in Party Pack 3 shows two players' responses. The other players are listed at the top of each reply, having voted for their favorite response. The "room code" allows audience members to join as players at any time.

Most games in The Jackbox Party Pack are designed for online play, requiring only one person to own and launch the game. Remaining players can be local and thus see the game via the first player's computer or console, or can be remote, watching the game be played through streaming media services. All players–whether local or remote–use either web-enabled devices, including personal computers and mobile or tablet devices, to enter a provided "room code" at Jackbox's dedicated servers (i.e. https://jackbox.tv/) to enter the game, or can use a Twitch extension controlled by the streamer to let viewers play directly via the Twitch viewer. Games are generally limited to 4-8 active players, but any other players connecting to the room after these players are connected become audience participants, who can impact how scoring is determined and influence the winner.

Each game generally has a period where all players are given a type of prompt. This prompt appears on the individual devices and gives players sufficient time to enter their reply or draw as necessary, and can be set to account for forced streaming delays that some streaming services require. The game then collects and processes all the replies, and frequently then gives players a chance to vote for the best answer or drawing; this is often where the audience may also participate by voting as a group. Games proceed for a number of rounds, and a winner, generally with the highest score at the end, is announced.

Ten of the eleven main packs are developed with a default ESRB Teen rating, with a family-friendly option to censor certain questions and player input, however Party Pack 8 has an ESRB E10+ rating.

== Platforms ==
All packs are available on PlayStation 4, Xbox One, Microsoft Windows, macOS and Linux, Apple TV, iPad, Android TV, Amazon Fire TV, and Nvidia Shield TV. Party Pack 1 is the only one available on the Xbox 360. Party Pack 1 and Party Pack 2 are the only two packs available on PlayStation 3. Starting on April 13, 2017, the packs are available on the Nintendo Switch. Starting in January 2018, the packs are available on Xfinity X1. Starting on October 14, 2021, the packs are available on PlayStation 5 and Xbox Series X/S. From November 16, 2021 to October 20, 2022, the packs were on Stadia before the service shut down on January 18, 2023.

The Jackbox Partyverse, which is currently in closed beta, is an ad-supported subscription service for web browsers and smart TVs to stream individual games with a rotating selection of five games available for free, or a monthly subscription including all games and fewer ads. Bilder previously said that the company was expecting to launch the service in 2026.

== Games ==
Release timeline
2014	The Jackbox Party Pack
2015	The Jackbox Party Pack 2
2016	Drawful 2
2016	The Jackbox Party Pack 3
2017	The Jackbox Party Pack 4
2018	The Jackbox Party Pack 5
2019	The Jackbox Party Pack 6
2020	The Jackbox Party Pack 7
2021	The Jackbox Party Pack 8
2022	The Jackbox Party Starter
2022	The Jackbox Party Pack 9
2023	The Jackbox Party Pack 10
2024	The Jackbox Megapicker
2024	The Jackbox Naughty Pack
2024	The Jackbox Survey Scramble
2025	The Jackbox Party Pack 11
2026	The Jackbox Party Essentials
2026	Trivia Murder Party 3
2026	The Jackbox Party Pack 12
2026	The Jackbox Partyverse

Numbered packs
Pack	Games				
1	You Don't Know Jack 2015	Drawful	Word Spud	Lie Swatter	Fibbage XL
2	Fibbage 2	Earwax	Bidiots	Quiplash XL	Bomb Corp.
3	Quiplash 2	Trivia Murder Party	Guesspionage	Fakin' It	Tee K.O.
4	Fibbage 3	Survive the Internet	Monster Seeking Monster	Bracketeering	Civic Doodle
5	You Don't Know Jack: Full Stream	Split the Room	Mad Verse City	Zeeple Dome	Patently Stupid
6	Trivia Murder Party 2	Role Models	Joke Boat	Dictionarium	Push the Button
7	Quiplash 3	The Devils and the Details	Champ'd Up	Talking Points	Blather 'Round
8	Drawful: Animate	The Wheel of Enormous Proportions	Job Job	The Poll Mine	Weapons Drawn
9	Fibbage 4	Roomerang	Junktopia	Nonsensory	Quixort
10	Tee K.O. 2	Timejinx	Fixy Text	Dodo Re Mi	Hypnotorious
11	Doominate	Hear Say	Cookie Haus	Suspectives	Legends of Trivia
12	We Forgot a Card	MegaPals	Debate and Switch	Hyperface	Idol Factions

Other packs
Pack	Games		
The Jackbox Party Starter	Quiplash 3	Tee K.O.	Trivia Murder Party 2
The Jackbox Naughty Pack	Fakin’ It All Night Long	Dirty Drawful	Let Me Finish
The Jackbox Party Essentials	Drawful 2	Quiplash 3	Fibbage 4

=== The Jackbox Party Pack (2014) ===
The Jackbox Party Pack was released on PlayStation 3, PlayStation 4, and Xbox One on November 19, 2014, and for Microsoft Windows and macOS on November 26, 2014. The Xbox 360 version was released on November 3, 2015, alongside retail editions for these console platforms published by Telltale Games. The Nintendo Switch version was released on August 17, 2017.

You Don't Know Jack 2015 is based on the standard format for You Don't Know Jack games. One to four players are tasked to answer multiple-choice trivia questions presented obscurely in the game's "high culture meets pop culture" format. Players earn virtual money for answering correctly in a short amount of time and lose money for wrong answers. Multiplayer games also feature "screws", where one player can force another player to answer immediately and can earn a bonus if the "screwed" player answers incorrectly or fails to answer. The player with the most money after two rounds of five questions (the first round always includes a "DisOrDat") and a "Jack Attack" wins.

Drawful is for 3 to 8 players and is a drawing game. Each round starts with each player individually being given a playful phrase and a drawing canvas on their local device. They have a short amount of time to draw out that phrase. Following this, each picture is presented to all players, and the players except for the artist must enter a phrase they think the picture represents. Then, all those replies, along with the actual phrase for that picture, are presented to the players to make their vote of what they think the original phrase was. The artist of the picture gets points for every other player that guessed their original phrase, while those who wrote other phrases get points for votes their phrase gets. The player with the most points after a number of rounds (depending on how many players are connected) wins.

Word Spud is for 2 to 8 players and is a word association game. A word is presented and one player comes up with a word that is associated with it. The remaining players vote if the association is good or not and the player who came up with the association scores or loses points accordingly. From there, the next player starts from the new word to come up with a new association, and the game continues. The player with the most points after a number of turns (depending on how many players are connected) wins.

Lie Swatter is a multiplayer version of the single-player mobile app that Jackbox Games released prior to The Jackbox Party Pack. The game challenges up to 100 players to correctly guess if presented trivia statements are true or not, "swatting" those that are false. Players earn points for correct answers with the fastest player earning additional points. The player with the most points after three rounds wins.

Fibbage XL is for 2 to 8 players and is an expansion of the standalone game that Jackbox Games released prior to the pack with new sets of questions. In the first two rounds, each player selects from one of five random categories, and an obscure fact is presented to all players with a missing word or phrase to complete it. Each player uses their local device to enter a reply for those missing words; if they enter the actual right answer, they are asked to enter something different, and if they can't enter an answer before the timer runs out, they can press the "lie for me" button and get to choose between two game-generated choices. Then, the game presents all replies, including the correct one, to the players, who then select what they think is the right answer. Players score points for selecting the right answer, but can also score if other players select their reply, so players are encouraged to provide seemingly correct answers for their replies. Players lose points for selecting the false answer the game wrote itself. In the final round, "The Final Fibbage", one more question is provided for all of the players to answer. The player with the most points at the end wins.

=== The Jackbox Party Pack 2 (2015) ===
The Jackbox Party Pack 2 was released for Microsoft Windows, macOS, PlayStation 3, PlayStation 4, and Xbox One on October 13, 2015. The Nintendo Switch version was released on August 17, 2017.

Fibbage 2 is for 2 to 8 players and is the sequel to Fibbage. Compared to its predecessor, Fibbage 2 introduces new sets of questions and the ability for the audience to vote on their favorite answers. A new option called the "Defibrillator" permits players to remove all of the answers except the right answer and one of the lies for one question.

Earwax is for 3 to 8 players. In each round, one player is selected as the judge and is given a choice of five prompts. The prompt is presented to the other players, and these players are each given six random sound effects. Each player then selects two of the sound effects, in order, as a reply to the prompt. The judge player selects which combined sounds make the most humorous or fitting answer, and that selected player earns a point. The first player to earn three points wins.

Bidiots is for 3 to 6 players and is a drawing game similar to Drawful. Players start by drawing images for randomly-assigned categories. Players then use in-game money to bid on these images as if at an art auction, trying to be the highest bidder for the image that matches specific categories that correspond to their money values. Players can use screws (similar to the You Don't Know Jack franchise) to force other players to bid, and if players run out of money, they can take out a "predatory loan" which must be paid back at end of the game. After the number of lots allotted the value of the images the players purchased are tabulated, and the player with the highest net worth wins.

Quiplash XL is for 3 to 8 players and is an expansion of the standalone game that Jackbox Games released prior to the pack with previous DLC (Quip Pack 1) and "over 100 brand new prompts". In the first two rounds, each player is given two prompts to provide an answer to; the prompts are given so that two players see each prompt. Players provide what they believe is a funny answer to each prompt. Then, all other players and the audience are shown a prompt and the two answers provided. They vote for the answer they think is the best quip. Points are gained by the percentage of votes between the two players that wrote the answers, and bonus points are awarded from a possible "quiplash" if they get all the votes. Entering the same thing as an opponent in a prompt doesn't award any points. In the final round, "The Last Lash", all players respond to the same prompt, and vote three times for the best answers of those presented. The player with the most points at the end wins.

Bomb Corp. is for 1 to 4 players. One player is an employee of a bomb factory that must deactivate inadvertently-started bombs as they come off the assembly lines, while other players are employees that are given different sets of instructions to help deactivate it. The instructions are specifically obtuse and potentially conflicting, requiring careful communication between players.

=== Drawful 2 (2016) ===
Drawful 2, a sequel to the game from The Jackbox Party Pack was released as a standalone title for Microsoft Windows, macOS, PlayStation 4, Xbox One, and Apple TV on June 21, 2016, and for the Nintendo Switch on June 21, 2018. The sequel features two colors to choose from as opposed to the original's single color and new prompts. It also adds the ability for users to create their own prompts, a feature not in the original. On May 6, 2021 the game received a free update, which included language support for French, Italian, German and Spanish and new content moderation settings.

=== The Jackbox Party Pack 3 (2016) ===
The Jackbox Party Pack 3 was released during the week of October 18, 2016, for Microsoft Windows, macOS, PlayStation 4, Xbox One, certain Android devices, and Apple TV. It was subsequently released on the Nintendo Switch on April 13, 2017. A version for Xfinity's X1 set-top box was released in January 2018. The game was written in Adobe Flash.

Quiplash 2 is for 3 to 8 players and is the sequel to Quiplash. Compared to its predecessor, Quiplash 2 introduces new prompts, the ability for the hosting player to create new prompts, the ability for the host to censor players, and the "safety quip" button that incorporates the ability for a player to have an answer written for them. The game also features new "Last Lash" rounds that either require players to come up with a meaning of a given acronym, complete a caption in a comic strip, or come up with something clever using a given word in a prompt; unlike the previous game's final round, medals determine the points distributed to the players.

Trivia Murder Party is for 1 to 8 players and is a multiple-choice trivia game (similar to the You Don't Know Jack franchise) with a lighthearted theme of a horror thriller (similar to the Saw franchise). Each round includes a multiple-choice trivia question, with players earning in-game money for being correct, and then a subsequent "Killing Floor" minigame if any "living" player answers one question incorrectly or if all "living" players answer two questions correctly in a row. The minigame may cost the lives of one or more remaining players, who then otherwise continue in the game as ghosts. Up to nine questions are played, followed by a tiebreaker minigame. The endgame starts when only one player remains alive and at least three questions have been played, where all players now try to escape along a darkening hallway: each question provides three possible answers to a category, and each player determines which answers belong to it; the leading player only sees two answers, giving trailing players the opportunities to take the lead. The first player to reach the exit by giving enough correct answers wins.

Guesspionage is for 2 to 8 players and is a percentage-guessing game. Each player in turn, guesses what percentage of people have a certain quality or do a certain activity, such as texting while driving. If there are more than five audience members, they are surveyed prior to the turns to get these percentages, otherwise earlier survey results by Jackbox Games are used. Once the current player makes their guess, the other players can consider if they are higher or lower than the guessed value, including opining if they are off by more than a certain amount. Points are scored by the current player based on how close they are and by the other players if they correctly guessed higher or lower. In the final round, one question with nine choices is given, and the players all have to pick what they think are the three most popular answers, with points awarded based on the answer's popularity. The player with the most points at the end wins.

Fakin' It is for 3 to 6 players and is a social deduction game that is played locally. In each round, one player is randomly selected to be the "Faker", and all players except the Faker are given instructions that involve some type of physical action, such as raising a hand or making a face; the Faker is not given this information but instead must figure out from the other players what to do. Each player then attempts to guess who the Faker was by their actions, with the round ending if the Faker is guessed correctly by all other players, or successfully escaping, after which points are awarded depending on whether the players guessed correctly and/or if the Faker escapes capture in each task out of the number allotted (3 for 4–6 players, 2 for 3 players). After the first round, players may select any action they like. The final round is always "Text You Up", where each player answers a number of open-ended questions, while the Faker is given different questions which can have overlapping answers with the questions given to the players. (For example, the other players may be asked about a positive trait about themselves, while the Faker would be asked what traits they would look for in a companion.) The player with the most points at the end wins.

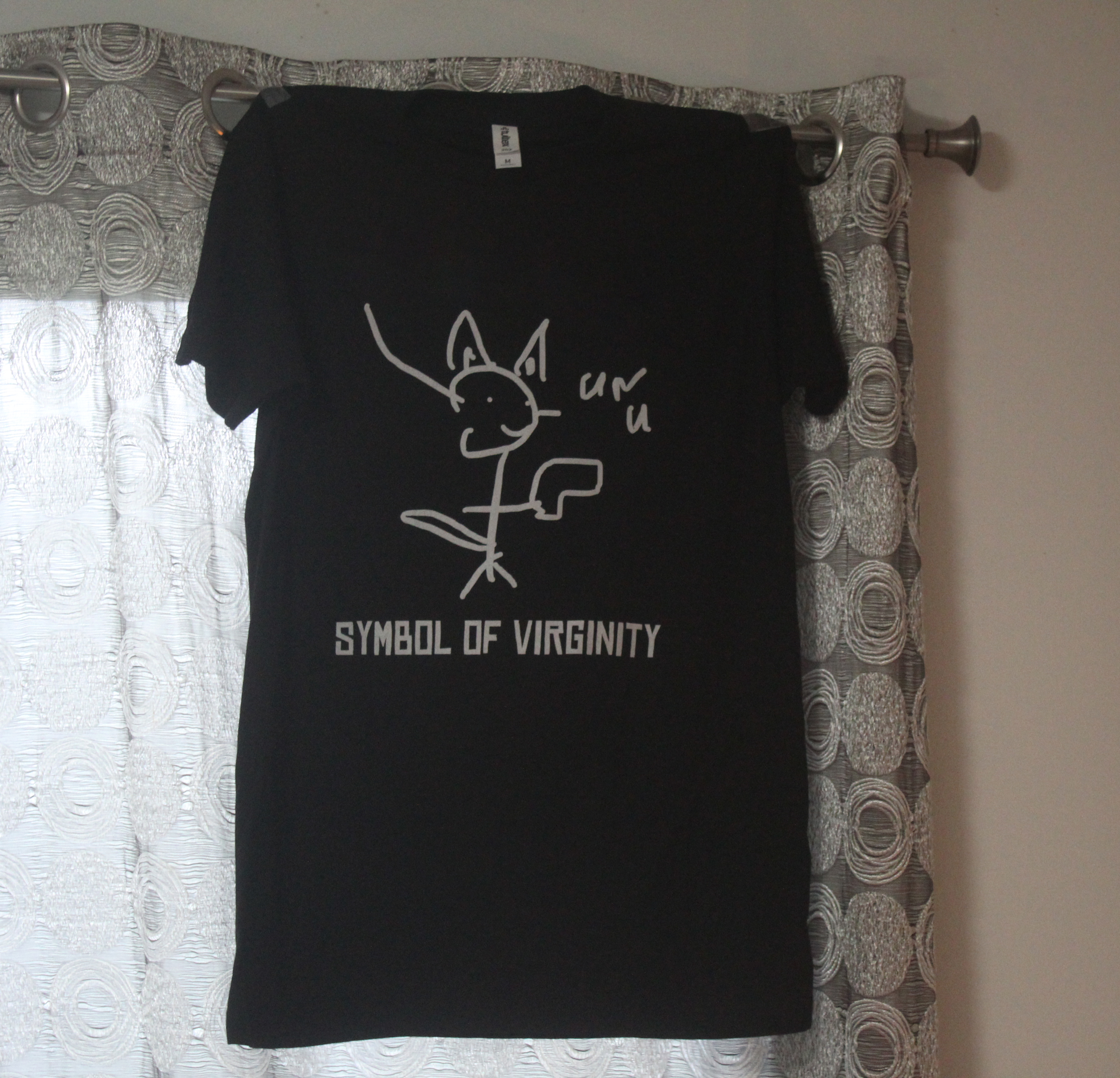
In Tee K.O, participants create shirts and captions for other players. After the game has concluded, participants can also purchase shirts directly from Jackbox Games.

Tee K.O. is for 3 to 8 players and is a drawing-based game. Each player starts by drawing three images of anything they want, though the game provides suggestions to help. Then each player has a chance to enter several short sayings or slogans. Subsequently, each player is then given two or more random drawings and two or more random sayings, and selects the pair that best fits together as printed on a T-shirt. These designs are then put into a one-on-one voting battle with all players and audience members to determine the best-voted T-shirt design and the design that had the longest voting streak. A second round of drawing, slogan writing, pairing, and voting is performed. The winning designs from each round are then put against each other to determine the ultimate winning design. After the game, players are able to order custom printed T-shirts.

=== The Jackbox Party Pack 4 (2017) ===
The Jackbox Party Pack 4 was released during the week of October 17, 2017, for Microsoft Windows, macOS, PlayStation 4, Xbox One, Nintendo Switch, various Android devices, and Apple TV. A version for Xfinity's X1 set-top box was released in January 2018.

Fibbage 3 is for 2 to 8 players and is the third game in the Fibbage series. The game includes new interactivity with the audience by letting them add their own lies to the selection and new "Final Fibbage" facts with two missing words or phrases instead of one. A new separate game mode called Fibbage: Enough About You replaces the game's traditional questions with questions relating to the players, the answers to which they write beforehand.

Survive the Internet is for 3 to 8 players and is a game of user-generated content that takes place on a fictional version of the Internet. In each round, each player receives a question that asks their opinion on a topic. Their answer is taken out of context and sent to another player, who is then told to determine what the reply was in response to as if they were on a specific site, attempting to twist the reply as best they can to make the first player look bad. All players and the audience are then presented with the pairs of original replies and the guessed topic, and vote on which pairing is the most ridiculous. Votes award a large number of points for the player that twisted the reply and a smaller number of points for the first player that provided the reply. The player with the most points after four rounds wins, having "survived the Internet".

Monster Seeking Monster is for 3 to 7 players and has a horror theme where each player is a disguised monster attempting to date other players. In each round, players start by sending up to four messages to other players; the non-playable monster, the robot, if the audience is turned off for 3–4 player games, generates messages right after a player texts to it; the audience, if turned on and participating, uses mad lib-style prompts to select phrases to send. Following this, each player selects one other player they would date based on those replies. If two players selected each other, they both earn a heart. If at least one player does not pick anyone else, they lose a heart. Additional scoring bonuses and effects due to the hidden monster powers are also accounted for. From the end of the second round on, the monster form of the leading player whose monster form is yet unknown, is revealed to all. The player with the most hearts after six rounds wins, unless other special conditions are met relating to the player's monster.

Bracketeering is for 3 to 16 players and is a tournament-style game played across three rounds. In each round, players are presented with a prompt to complete with the best or funniest answers they can. (The number of answers allotted are 2 for 3–4 players and 1 for 5–16 players.) These answers are randomly placed on a tournament-style grid (8 for 3–8 players and 16 for 9–16 players). The players are then given one of the tournament matchups and predict which answer will win that matchup. Subsequently, each matchup is then presented to all players and the audience. The answer that gets the highest percentage of votes wins, with the percentage that it wins by tied to how much in-game money those players that guessed that match correctly get. Subsequent matchups use these best answers going forward. After the final matchup, the player that provided the winning reply gets an additional cash bonus. The second round is a "blind bracket" where the players are presented with a prompt, but the brackets are based on a different, related prompt using those answers. The final round is a "triple blind bracket" where the prompt at each level of the bracket changes. The player with the most money at the end of the game is declared the winner.

Civic Doodle is for 3 to 8 players and is a drawing game similar to Drawful and Bidiots with two players drawing the same piece of art simultaneously. In the first two rounds, a start of a doodle is presented to two randomly selected players, and they have a short time to draw atop that; this is done in real-time allowing the other players and the audience to provide feedback on either drawing in the form of preselected emoji. After the timer is done, the players and audience vote for which drawing is better, with points awarded to both players based on how many votes they received, as well as an additional point bonus based on the emoji votes. Subsequently, two more players then draw atop the highest-voted picture. After a number of matchups, depending on how many players are in the game, players have to suggest and then vote for a title for the highest-voted picture. In the final round, all players are presented with a title and a start of a doodle, and they all have to draw the requested features. The player with the most points at the end wins.

=== The Jackbox Party Pack 5 (2018) ===
The Jackbox Party Pack 5 was released on October 17, 2018, for PlayStation 4, Xbox One, Nintendo Switch, Microsoft Windows, macOS, Linux, Apple TV, iPad, Amazon Fire TV, Nvidia Shield TV, and Xfinity X1.

You Don't Know Jack: Full Stream is the newest iteration of the You Don't Know Jack franchise. The game is updated to feature streaming-friendly features similar to most other Party Pack games. This includes support for up to eight players and an audience. As the game now uses both mobile devices and computers as controllers, text-based questions like the "Gibberish Question" return; new and classic question types are present.

Split the Room is for 3 to 8 players and is a scenario game. In each round, each player is presented with a hypothetical yes-no question with a missing component. Players then try to fill in the missing component in a way such that the other players' yes or no responses to it are evenly split, with more points for an equal division of answers. The final round, the "Decisive Dimension", replaces the yes-no question with a multiple-choice question with two options, one of which is the missing component. The player with the most points at the end wins.

Mad Verse City is for 3 to 8 players and has players use giant robots to out-rap their opponents in freestyle battles. In each round, players are given who they are trying to out-rap, and use their device to fill in various prompts given to them. The game then runs through each rap using a text-to-speech voice, after which the other players and the audience have to choose the rap that they feel is the best. In-game money is awarded by the percentage of votes they garner, and the player with the most money after three rounds wins.

Zeeple Dome is for 1 to 6 players. Players are contestants in an alien combat arena, the Zeeple Dome, to take down aliens. The game is physics-based and has players slingshot their characters across the game's levels, working together to defeat enemies, earn in-game money which functions as the score, and gain power-ups for their team.

Patently Stupid is for 3 to 8 players and is a game of problem-solving, inventing and funding. In the first round, players individually write out problems that need to be solved. These are randomly distributed among players, who are then given the opportunity to draw and name an invention to solve that problem. Players are then able to present their invention to the other players (either using their own voice or allowing the game to present). The other players and the audience then vote on their favorite inventions, "funding" them. Inventions that surpass a funding minimum get a bonus to their inventor. In the final round, one player has to choose a problem for all players to solve. The player with the most money at the end wins.

=== The Jackbox Party Pack 6 (2019) ===
The Jackbox Party Pack 6 was announced in March 2019 during PAX East and was released on October 17, 2019, for PlayStation 4, Xbox One, Nintendo Switch, Microsoft Windows, macOS, Linux, Apple TV, iPad, Amazon Fire TV, Nvidia Shield TV, and Xfinity X1. The Stadia version was released on December 21, 2021.

Trivia Murder Party 2 is for 1 to 8 players. It is the sequel to Trivia Murder Party and follows a similar format, taking place in a hotel. In addition to new questions, it includes new "Killing Floor" minigames (including Quiplash), special items which can help or hinder their ability to survive, and a barrier in the endgame's exit, where players have to answer a question correctly before they can escape (the leading player now sees the third answer at the barrier). Also, the audience is their own player, whereas they were a separate entity in the first Trivia Murder Party. The game's question database received a free update in 2024 to include 164 brand-new questions in addition to the original questions.

Role Models is for 3 to 6 players and is in a format of a personality test. In each round, players first vote for one of the five categories and then try to match the other players (including themselves) to one of the items from that category. Points are gained by making matches that are the majority favorite of the group, and extra points can be won if the player marked their answer as "99% sure" and was correct. In case two or more players receive the same number of matches towards an item or one player has not been assigned an item by the others, it is determined by an additional task. The player with the most points after three rounds wins.

Joke Boat is for 3 to 8 players and has players make jokes based on a selected list of words brainstormed by players at the start of the game. During each round, players are given the start of a joke prompt with a missing word selected from a random selection of the brainstormed words, that they must then complete. Players are then able to perform their joke (either using their own voice or allowing the game to perform), two at a time. The other players and the audience then vote for their favorite of the two, which determines the amount of points awarded. The final round has players take an existing joke setup and try to write a better joke than the original one. The player with the most points at the end wins.

Dictionarium is for 3 to 8 players and involves players creating fake entries for a dictionary. The game can either be played where the players are given a fake word or a fake slang saying as a prompt. The game is played across three rounds. In the first and second rounds, players respectively write a definition for the given word or phrase and a synonym for it. In the final round, players write a sentence using the synonym created. The other players and the audience vote for their favorite choice in each round, awarding points to its writer. The player with the most points at the end wins.

Push the Button is for 4 to 10 players. It is a social deduction game set on a spaceship, where one or more players have been assigned as an alien and the other players, as humans, must eject all of the aliens before a timer runs out. In each round, one player determines an activity on the ship (such as drawing or writing a response to a question) and selects a number of the other crew to participate. The assigned human players get one prompt, but the alien players get a different one that would likely cause some confusion. The results are shown, and players have the time to determine if any response seems suspicious. In later rounds, alien players have "hacks" they can use to either get the correct human prompt or send the alien prompt instead to a human player. At any time before the timer runs down, one player can "push the button" and select the other player(s) they believe are an alien. All other players then vote if they agree or not. In order for the players to be ejected, a unanimous vote must be passed. If the vote fails, the game continues and the player that pushed the button cannot do so again. If the vote succeeds, the game reveals if the players were correct or incorrect. The alien players win if any of the players vote out a human, the human players run out of button pushes, or none of the players push the button before the time is up.

=== The Jackbox Party Pack 7 (2020) ===
The Jackbox Party Pack 7 was released on October 15, 2020, for PlayStation 4, Xbox One, Nintendo Switch, Microsoft Windows, macOS, Linux, Apple TV, iPad, Amazon Fire TV, Nvidia Shield TV, and Xfinity X1. The Stadia version was released on December 7, 2021.

Quiplash 3 is for 3 to 8 players. It is the third game in the Quiplash series and has the game's signature final round, "The Last Lash", replaced with the "Thriplash", where instead of all players answering the same prompt, each pair of players only receives one prompt instead of the usual two, but must answer with three separate responses. (The host will play with the player in last place if there is an odd number of players in the game.) The game's two-dimensional style art is also replaced by claymation.

The Devils and the Details is for 3 to 8 players. Players become a family of devils, trying to work together to complete a list of mundane chores in certain scenarios (e.g. while a relative is visiting) with each successful task scoring points towards a net score during one of the three days of an episode. Many chores require verbal communication from one player to another to complete which can create confusion. As the players are devils, they are competing against each other. They can complete "selfish" chores, which provide extra points to the player who completed them but also build the selfishness meter, so the other players have to stop that player from doing the selfish chores. When the selfishness meter is full, it creates a family emergency (e.g. a flooded basement, a burning kitchen or a power outage), lowering the total score bar and making it harder to successfully finish a single day. If a day ends with the family score bar that reached the target score, the game proceeds to the next day. If the game ends when the family score bar doesn't reach the target score on either the first or second days, then the VIP player will have to either retry the day or quit the game after the unsuccessful day. The third day however is a challenge. If the day ends with the family score bar not reaching the target score, the episode will be over with just the final scores and some tasks completed (there is no retrying on this day). If the day ends with all of the tasks completed and the family score bar reaching the target score, then the winner will get a prize after the game.

Champ'd Up is for 3 to 8 players. Players start by creating their own champions and challengers via a drawing interface with unusual monikers and skills, similar to Tee K.O.'s T-shirts. The players' creations are then pitted against each other with players and the audience votes for the best one in each round based on how fitting a character is for the given category. In-game money is gained by the percentage of votes between the players that made their champions/challengers. The player with the most money after two rounds wins.

Talking Points is for 3 to 8 players. Each person starts by creating three speech titles and then choosing one of the three on their devices. Then, one player, as a presenter, is shown a series of text and picture slides which they are seeing for the first time, and has to use their own voice to talk through these to impress the audience, which votes with their reactions. The other players in the game act as assistants to the presenter to select the next slide that the presenter will see from a random selection, which could either help or throw off the presenter. Points are rewarded to the presenter based on how many times the audience reacted and the graph and to the assistants. The other players then write a comment about the presentation. After all the players have presented, each player gets to give out an award to another player, which boosts their score. The player with the most points at the end wins. The game also has a free-play game mode.

Blather 'Round is for 2 to 6 players. The game's style is very similar to Charades, where players have to pick a place, story, thing, or person to describe using sentences. While one player gives hints to what they have chosen with fixed sentences, the other players and the audience must try to guess what the presenter is describing. Points are awarded to the presenter and whoever correctly guesses what word they chose, as well as those who contributed a helpful hint. The player with the most points after two rounds wins.

=== The Jackbox Party Pack 8 (2021) ===
The Jackbox Party Pack 8 was released on October 14, 2021, for PlayStation 4, PlayStation 5, Xbox One, Xbox Series X/S, Nintendo Switch, Microsoft Windows, macOS, Linux, Apple TV, iPad, Amazon Fire TV, Nvidia Shield TV, and Xfinity X1. The Stadia version was released on November 16, 2021.

Drawful: Animate is for 3 to 10 players and is the third game in the Drawful series. The highlight feature is that players create a two-frame animation rather than a single static drawing. Other added features include having three colors to use for drawing and the ability to double down on a guess once per round which awards double points if correct, but if incorrect, awards the player who wrote the fake answer double points instead. A "friend mode" is also included which uses prompts that include the players' names.

The Wheel of Enormous Proportions is for 2 to 8 players and is a trivia game. At the start of the game, players write a soul-seeking question for the wheel to answer. Players start each trivia round with two slices each and can win more by performing well on trivia questions. During the spinning round, players place their slices onto the wheel and take turns spinning it, earning points when the wheel lands on a slot they picked. The number of points gained increases as the wheel is spun more and points are divided between players who picked the same slot. The spinning round ends when a Spin Meter fills up, and a new trivia round begins. Once a player reaches 20,000 points, any points that player gains from the wheel allows them to spin the Winner Wheel that determines them as the game's winner. The wheel then answers the question the winner wrote at the start of the game.

Job Job is for 3 to 10 players and is a job interview question game. At the beginning of each round, players answer a number of icebreaker questions in any way they want. Afterwards, all of the responses are shuffled between players where the goal is to answer job interview questions using only words from the icebreaker responses and the question itself. The interview question and the two provided responses are then pitted up and players and the audience vote on their favorite answer. Points are gained via a percentage of votes between the two players, and bonus points are awarded to players whose words were used in a winning answer or if their winning response contains words from three different players. In the final round, instead of interview questions, players create short responses about themselves by answering the same two statements. The player with the most points at the end wins.

The Poll Mine is for 2 to 10 players. Players are split into two teams of adventurers trapped in a cave by an evil witch. To escape, all players answer an opinion-based poll of eight options in order of preference. Afterwards, each team takes turns opening one from a set of doors, each marked by an answer from the poll. The first round has the teams find the top three most popular answers, while the second has them find the 2nd, 3rd and 4th most popular answers. Each correct answer earns a team a torch, while incorrect answers cause them to lose one. In the final round, the teams must open doors from least to most popular. During this round, no torches are gained, but existing torches are still lost from picking an incorrect door. When a team loses their last torch, the other team must pick the correct door to win the game. If all doors are correctly opened, the team with the most torches remaining wins. The game also has a streamer mode where one team consist of the players and the other consisting of the audience who pick a door by majority vote.

Weapons Drawn is for 4 to 8 players and is a social deduction game. Everyone plays the role of a group of detectives and murderers attending a party. Players draw two murder weapons containing a letter from their name they must hide and name an accomplice to bring as their guest. Players then attempt to murder accomplices by figuring out whoever they think invited them as a guest. If successful, one of the culprit's murder weapons is left at the scene. For reference, the game reveals one weapon drawn by each player. Players vote between two cases to solve and attempt to work together to analyze the murder weapon and vote for who they think committed the crime. During the final round, players in rapid succession, guess every remaining unsolved murder, the murderer gaining points for every detective they fool. Points are given by inviting accomplices that receive a high number of murder attempts, successfully evading being deduced as the culprit and correctly finding the culprits of other murders. The player with the most points at the end wins.

=== The Jackbox Party Starter (2022) ===
The Jackbox Party Starter was released on June 30, 2022, for PlayStation 4, PlayStation 5, Xbox One, Xbox Series X/S, Nintendo Switch, Microsoft Windows, macOS, Linux, Apple TV, iPad, Amazon Fire TV, Nvidia Shield TV, and Xfinity X1. It contains three previously released games, Quiplash 3, Tee K.O, and Trivia Murder Party 2, that are all updated to include new features, such as moderation and subtitles. Furthermore, additional language translations, including French, German, Italian, and Spanish (European and American), were added.

=== The Jackbox Party Pack 9 (2022) ===
The Jackbox Party Pack 9 was released on October 20, 2022, for PlayStation 4, PlayStation 5, Xbox One, Xbox Series X/S, Nintendo Switch, Microsoft Windows, macOS, Linux, Apple TV, iPad, Amazon Fire TV, Nvidia Shield TV, Xfinity X1, and Stadia.

Fibbage 4 is for 2 to 8 players and is the fourth game in the Fibbage series. The game includes new themed episodes, new "Final Fibbage" rounds with two facts, and questions provided by fans of Jackbox Games solicited ahead of the game's release.

Roomerang is for 4 to 9 players and is themed around a reality show. Players take on roles as characters with a defining trait, and are to give responses that fit that trait as well as working with the traits of other characters. The player with the highest voted response wins the round and an advantage in the following elimination phase. Eliminated players lose some points but are brought back into the game with a new trait. The player with the most points after five rounds is declared the winner of the overall game.

Junktopia is for 3 to 8 players. Players select one item of interest from three random items and buy that item with money given to them at the beginning. The players can attempt to haggle but this can backfire and cause them to pay more than the original price. They then have to give a fake name and history to these objects and then try to sell it to the other players verbally for the most money compared to other players' items. The player who made the biggest profit off of their garbage wins.

Nonsensory is for 3 to 8 players and is a silly, laid-back writing, drawing and guessing game. The players must guess what is the percentage or on a scale of 1 to 10 how a text-based response or drawing made by another player is based on the prompt given. The players get points relative to how close to the answer they get. The player with the most points after three rounds wins.

Quixort is for 1 to 10 players and presents players with a prompt that players will be sorting answers under, such as "animals by number of legs". The answers are then presented as falling blocks which the players must then try to place in the proper order. Points are rewarded based on how close the answers were. The game is played in teams across three rounds, but a separate game within the Party Pack, Quixort Forever, allows a single player or a single team to try to proceed as far as possible.

=== The Jackbox Party Pack 10 (2023) ===
The Jackbox Party Pack 10 was announced on February 8, 2023, and released on October 19, 2023, for PlayStation 4, PlayStation 5, Xbox One, Xbox Series X/S, Nintendo Switch, Microsoft Windows, macOS, Linux, Apple TV, iPad, Amazon Fire TV, Nvidia Shield TV, and Xfinity X1.

Tee K.O. 2 is for 3 to 8 players and is the sequel to Tee K.O.. Compared to its predecessor, Tee K.O. 2 has new and improved drawing tools, and drawings can now be printed on a hoodie or a tank top, with four different font choices for the slogan. The garments are then pitted against each other in a bracket with only one winner from both matchups. In the second round, players can also choose to redesign another drawing that they can use for their garment. In the final round, players need to tap continuously on the garment that they want to win. As with Tee K.O., players can order custom printed drawings after the game.

Timejinx is for 1 to 8 players and is a trivia game themed around the concept of time travel. In the first three rounds, players are given a "mission" to go back to the year that a moment in history took place. Players accumulate points for how far off they were at from a year. After every three completed "missions", players then take part in "side missions" for the opportunity to lower their score. In "TimeHop", players have to blend in to three different parties set in different decades by responding with an appropriate response. In "TimeLoop", players answer the same two trivia questions twice in a row and has the choice to either stick with their previous answer or change it. In "TimeFix", players are shown two historical events that have been "altered" and need to select the right response to fix the mess. For each correct answer players get correct, a percentage of their score is taken off. Occasionally during the second and third rounds, an alarm will go off indicating that either an impostor has run loose or a location has been altered, and players have to find the correct answer as another opportunity to lower their scores. In the final round, players travel to the future, where they need to guess the exact year a moment in history took place and add it to the total number of years that the future event will take place. The closer the player is to the future year, the higher percentage of points they get off their score. The player with the lowest score at the end wins.

FixyText is for 3 to 8 players. The objective is for players to create chaotic responses to text messages created by the host. Players are split into two groups and are assigned a template to type on. During the typing phase, players can move their cursor around the message, but cannot backspace or delete their messages, making any words they leave behind permanent. After typing is over, a text-to-speech voice reads out the entire message and the non-typing players and the audience vote on what words they like the most. The player with the most points after three rounds wins.

Dodo Re Mi is for 1 to 9 players and is a rhythm game themed around birds. Unlike previous games by Jackbox Games, Dodo Re Mi can be played for as many rounds as desired. Players can choose a selection of public domain songs, songs from previous Jackbox Party Packs, or original compositions made specially for the game, totaling 32 songs. Players unlock more songs by completing goals in-game, or can choose to unlock all songs with an option in settings. After a song is selected, players then choose an instrument, each having their own melody group and difficulty level. Once the song begins, players sync their device with the game screen when the host shouts "Tap Tap Tap". After everyone has played their notes, players are then taken to a "music-loving carnivorous plant", and each note that a player has played correctly feeds the plant. If players successfully feed the plant up to five stars, the group survives, but if they fall short of this goal, the plant eats the group. Depending on the players' performance, they can also reach gold status with a song. The host then has the option to either retry the song, go to a new song, or end their session. When the host chooses to end the game, the players are shown a result screen, denoting the player who had the longest combo, the player in last place, and the player who won with the highest score.

Hypnotorious is for 4 to 8 players and is a social deduction game taking place in a stage theater show. At the start of the game, the host "hypnotizes" the players and assigns them a secret identity that matches a secret category. They then give those players a question that they will have to answer under their secret identity. Once the answers are shown, players subsequently have to categorize themselves in one of three jars (two if there are only four players) and try to find if they belong with each other. After three questions are answered, the host reveals that there is an "Outlier" among the group, whose answers do not match either of the categories that the players think they belong in, and that even the "Outlier" does not even know they are the "Outlier". If players unanimously catch the "Outlier", they earn points, but if the players get it wrong, the "Outlier" get points. After the accusation, the categories and identities are revealed and if players successfully group themselves, they earn points. The player with the most points after two rounds wins.

=== The Jackbox Megapicker (2024) ===
The Jackbox Megapicker is a free piece of software released on Steam on July 29, 2024, which allows users to launch any of the individual games from the Party Packs owned by the user without having to launch the pack itself, and provides search features and news from Jackbox Games.

=== The Jackbox Naughty Pack (2024) ===
Taking a break from the Party Pack format for the year, Jackbox announced The Jackbox Naughty Pack, which was released on September 12, 2024, for PlayStation 4, PlayStation 5, Xbox One, Xbox Series X/S, Nintendo Switch, Microsoft Windows, macOS, Linux, Apple TV, iPad, Amazon Fire TV, Nvidia Shield TV, and Xfinity X1, and has an ESRB Mature 17+ rating. It features three games that are all designed around mature-rated content. Jackbox stated that their audience had been requesting games designed around mature jokes and interactions for some time.

Fakin' It All Night Long is for 3 to 8 players and is a follow-up to Fakin' It from Party Pack 3. It features new categories and a "remote play" mode to be played on stream.

Dirty Drawful is for 3 to 8 players and is the fourth game in the Drawful series. It features "spicy prompts", an emote system, and an "undo" button.

Let Me Finish is for 3 to 8 players and is a debate-style presentation game. In each round, a question and an image are shown. Two players are randomly selected to present on their opinion by speaking and drawing on the image. The other players and the audience then vote on who had the best response. Points are gained by the percentage of votes between the two players. After the vote, only one player can jump in and express their opinion to earn bonus points. The player with the most points at the end wins.

=== The Jackbox Survey Scramble (2024) ===
The Jackbox Survey Scramble is a standalone title released on October 24, 2024 that works similar to the other Party Pack games, based around guessing popularity of answers to survey questions, based on the Poll Mine game from Party Pack 8. The game features multiple game modes, typically with players divided into teams working together to identify answers on the poll and score points. The game's polls are dynamic, with all answers supplied by players collected and used to amend the data for the poll question over time.

=== The Jackbox Party Pack 11 (2025) ===
The Jackbox Party Pack 11 was announced on April 7, 2025 and released for PlayStation 4, PlayStation 5, Xbox One, Xbox Series X/S, Nintendo Switch, Microsoft Windows, macOS, Linux, Apple TV, iPad, Amazon Fire TV, Nvidia Shield TV, and Xfinity X1 on October 23, 2025, consisting of five original games.

Doominate is for 3 to 8 players and is a joke-writing game where players ruin nice things in a funny way. In the first round, players choose preselected prompts and in the second round, they create their own. In the third round, players must unruin some of the previously ruined prompts by writing another joke. The other players and the audience vote for their favorite joke in each round, awarding points to its writer. The player with most points at the end wins.

Hear Say is for 2 to 8 players. Players use microphones to record sounds based on a prompt that will be used in a stock video after the vote. In the first two rounds, each player records one sound, and in the final round, they record two and the video uses three sounds. All players and the audience vote for the best sound in each round, awarding points to whoever recorded that sound. The player with the most points at the end wins.

Cookie Haus is for 3 to 8 players and is a drawing game set in a cookie shop where clients make cookie requests. The players must make a cookie based on a client's request by choosing the shape, drawing on it, adding sprinkles, and naming the cookie. Two of each of the cookies are presented, and other players and the audience vote, awarding points to its creator. The player with the most points at the end wins.

Suspectives is for 4 to 8 players and is a social deduction game where players answer surveys before the game. A crime is committed based on the survey responses and one player is guilty. Players must find the culprit with evidence based on the survey responses, but one of them is a false piece of evidence that links to an innocent player.

Legends of Trivia is for 1 to 6 players. It is a cooperative trivia game set in a RPG world where players fight monsters by answering trivia questions (some of which are multiple choice in a similar fashion to the You Don't Know Jack and Trivia Murder Party franchises), with wrong answers causing the monsters to fight back. The goal is to finish each level with enough gold to be considered legendary.

=== The Jackbox Party Essentials (2026) ===
The Jackbox Party Essentials was released on April 9, 2026, exclusively through Netflix Games for use on select smart TVs and web browsers. It, similarly to The Jackbox Party Starter, contains three previously released games: Drawful 2, Quiplash 3, and Fibbage 4. Unlike other Party Packs, players must use the Netflix Game Controller app and scan a QR code to play rather than use a web browser and room code.

=== Trivia Murder Party 3 (2026) ===
Trivia Murder Party 3 is a standalone game based on the previous two games in the third and sixth packs, released in early access on Microsoft Windows and macOS on September 17, 2026, with the 1.0 version scheduled to be released for computers, PlayStation 5, Xbox Series X/S, and Nintendo Switch 2 in 2027. Players are challenged by a host, seemingly a serial killer, to answer multiple-choice trivia questions, with those making wrong answers forced into a minigame which may kill their avatar. Unlike the first two games, which have up to nine questions are played followed by a tiebreaker minigame, this game plays up to seven rounds of questions. Also, unlike in the first two games where the game ends without a winner if all players die without playing at least three rounds of questions and minigames, this game features a "Reviver Wheel" to determine who will be resurrected upon all players' deaths; players with fewer to no points don't have a chance of resurrection. The game also features "plot twists" such as opinion-based questions, "jumpscares", and aiming flashlights at the question. Sometimes, a round demands one death, and if all "living" players survive a minigame, the "living" player with the lowest score is killed.

=== The Jackbox Party Pack 12 (2026) ===
The Jackbox Party Pack 12 was announced on May 6, 2026 and released for PlayStation 4, PlayStation 5, Xbox One, Xbox Series X/S, Nintendo Switch, Microsoft Windows, macOS, Linux, Apple TV, iPad, Amazon Fire TV, Nvidia Shield TV, and Xfinity X1 on October 15, 2026, consisting of five original games.

We Forgot a Card is for 3 to 8 players and takes place in a greeting card factory. In the first two rounds, players start by voting for one of three special occasions. Each player then chooses a card front and writes a funny greeting inside the card. The other players and the audience then vote for their favorite card, awarding points to its writer. In the final round, players make greeting cards for talking plushies. The player with the most points at the end wins.

MegaPals is for 3 to 8 players and is a mind-melding game. In each round, players write a lot of words and phrases in response to a prompt. The game then searches for matches between any of the players, awarding points to them. If all players entered the same thing in a "MegaMatch", they all earn points. The players and the audience then give likes to any unmatched words or phrases, awarding bonus points to the player who wrote that unmatched word or phrase. In the second round, players choose the next word to work on after each matchup. In the final round, each player or two receives a prompt and chooses five answers at random while the other players type answers to the players in the prompt. The two players with the most points at the end win.

Debate and Switch is for 2 to 8 players and is a debate-style game. In each round, players write statements that will be argued in each debate. Each pair of players then choose what they want to argue; the first player chooses two of all of the available options, and the second player chooses one of the first player's options. Subsequently, each debate is presented; each debating player takes turns using their own voice to make arguments, while the other players and the audience choose between yes or no and type responses to them. Points are awarded to each debating player once the other players and the audience make their final vote. The player with the most points at the end wins.

Hyperface is for 3 to 8 players. In each round, each player is given two prompts and must choose a stock photo or take a selfie and warp or draw on the photo to match each prompt. Each prompt and two photos are then shown to the other players and the audience, who then vote for their favorite photo, awarding points to the player who changed the look of their photo. In the final round, players can also choose a photo from the previous rounds and do further warping or drawing on it, and either two or three photos are shown for each prompt. The player with the most points at the end wins.

Idol Factions is for 2 to 8 players and is played in two teams across three rounds. In each round, the teams are presented with a number of categories that players must sort answers into. Each player on each team must direct each answer to the path of each category. Points are gained if the answer is in the correct category. The first team to finish the round gets an additional point bonus. The team with the most points at the end of the game wins.

== Reception ==
Jackbox Games stated that sales jumped by up to 1,000% from March to May 2020, the first three months of the COVID-19 pandemic shutdown. Though sales since leveled off after that point, the company said that its playerbase still grew, doubling from 100 million players in 2019 to 200 million by October 2020 due to the ongoing pandemic.

PC Gamer said "the Jackbox games are the perfect way to beat the social distancing blues". Wired considered the Party Packs, along with Fall Guys and Among Us, as popular narrative-less games during the pandemic, as they helped to avoid the "cultural trauma" the pandemic had brought.

== See also ==
- Use Your Words, a video game similar to games in The Jackbox Party Pack
- What The Dub?
