= You Don't Know Jack (2011 video game) =

2011 release of trivia-based party game series

- Developers: Jellyvision Games; Iron Galaxy (PS3/Wii/Xbox 360); Webfoot Technologies (DS)
- Publisher: THQ
- Directors: Steve Heinrich; Harry Nathan Gottlieb
- Composer: Andy Poland
- Series: You Don't Know Jack
- Platforms: Windows, Nintendo DS, PlayStation 3, Wii, Xbox 360, iOS
- Release: NA: February 8, 2011; iOS: NA: April 2011
- Genre: Party
- Modes: Single-player, multiplayer

You Don't Know Jack is a 2011 party video game developed by Jellyvision Games and published by THQ. It was Jellyvision's first entry in the You Don't Know Jack series after an eight-year hiatus. The game was released exclusively in North America on February 8, 2011, for Microsoft Windows, Nintendo DS, PlayStation 3, Wii and Xbox 360 platforms. The game took advantage of online connectivity and other features of modern gaming consoles. A single-player iOS port was released about two months later, but was later pulled in anticipation of a more robust client based on the Facebook version of the game.

The game is structured around a fictional game show emceed by Cookie Masterson (voiced by Tom Gottlieb), in which the players answer ten multiple-choice questions, and then compete in a final "Jack Attack" round. Answering quickly and correctly earns virtual money to track the players' scores, while incorrect answers are penalized. As per the game's motto, "the irreverent trivia party game", the questions often combine general knowledge with popular culture references and verbal wordplay to determine the correct answer. Similar to the fourth game The Ride, the 2011 game provides 73 episodes with a predefined set of questions in the base game (the DS version only has the first 37). 40 additional episodes were available as DLC in four packs of ten for digital purchase exclusively on the Xbox 360 and PlayStation 3 via the Xbox Live Marketplace and PlayStation Store until 2013.

The game, on home consoles, supports both offline and online play (with the exception of the Wii which lacks online multiplayer) with up to four players, while the Microsoft Windows and Nintendo DS versions only support two local players and lack features such as online play and access to download various DLC packs. You Don't Know Jack was generally well-received, seen as a humorous return to form for the series, though the lack of online play or additional content for the Windows version was criticized.

== Gameplay ==
You Don't Know Jack is played out as a fictional trivia game show for one to four players (except for the Microsoft Windows and Nintendo DS versions which is for one or two players), with the goal to win the most virtual money at the end of the game. Each game uses a pre-defined set of ten questions from over seventy episodes, titled by the name of the show's fictional sponsor. Most questions are multiple choice, providing one correct and three incorrect answers, along with a 20-second timer that starts once the question has been completely presented. All players play at the same time, entering their choice of answer before the timer runs out. If a player is correct, they get a base dollar amount plus a bonus defined by how quickly they answered, while if they miss the question, they lose a similar amount of money. Failing to answer does not affect a player's score.

Each player in multiplayer games is also given a single opportunity to "screw" another player, forcing them to answer the question in a much shorter time period of five seconds. If the screwed player answers incorrectly or fails to answer within the time limit, the player who screwed that player gets money from them. However, if the screwed player answers correctly, that player also steals money from the player who screwed them.

A typical multiple-choice question in You Don't Know Jack, waiting to be answered by all four players as listed at the bottom of the screen.

The game's trivia is based on general knowledge from several fields including science, history, and geography, combined with contemporary entertainment, celebrities, and other news items; the game, as well as the series, is often described as "high culture meets pop culture". For example, one question asks the players to identify which Jennifer Aniston film title would most likely have been suited for a hypothetical romantic comedy penned by Albert Einstein about the interactions between neutrons and electrons, the answer being "He's Just Not That Into You". The majority of questions are presented in the standard multiple-choice format, but some of them use recurring concepts, such as questions based on a fortune cookie message, ones about a dream Cookie had based on a movie or TV show, or ones read through Cookie's ventriloquist dummy incorporating a speech impediment that may make the question harder to understand.

In addition to the usual questions, each episode typically features a "DisOrDat" question. This question gives the players seven words, phrases, or symbols which they have to identify as one of two possible classifications, or in some cases, both. For example, one DisOrDat series asks the players to identify terms that would be features of a Nexus One phone, Nexxus shampoo, or both. In offline multiplayer, only the player with the lowest score plays the DisOrDat, while other players try to steal money by getting the answer right if the main player gets it wrong. In online multiplayer, all players play the DisOrDat simultaneously. Also in each episode, players are challenged to look for the "Wrong Answer of the Game", which appears in one of the questions and is hinted at by the episode's sponsor; for example, in an episode sponsored by a baby crib company, the answer "Cat's Cradle" is the "Wrong Answer" that matches the sponsor. Choosing this answer does not penalize the player, but instead rewards them with a large monetary bonus along with a collectible gift.

After ten questions across the first two rounds are completed, the final round of the game is the "Jack Attack" where all players compete against each other. Prior to the round, a brief clue is shown to the players to describe a relationship that they must match, for example "BFF" (Best Friends Forever). The game then shows one word, phrase, or letter and then cycles through other words, phrases, or letters which the players must match. Buzzing in with the wrong answer causes players to lose money; only the first player to buzz in at the correct time wins and earns money. After seven such words, phrases, or letters the final scores are tallied and the winner is announced.

== Development ==
You Don't Know Jack was developed by Chicago-based company Jellyvision. The You Don't Know Jack (YDKJ) series, though popular in the 1990s during the rise of gaming on personal computers, had not had an official full release since 1998 with You Don't Know Jack: The Ride. Though Jellyvision offered some web-based You Don't Know Jack games in the interim years, the developers left the gaming market after seeing the rise of home gaming consoles in the early 2000s. Though they had considered adapting the game for consoles, and had produced two titles for the original PlayStation, they could only realize You Don't Know Jack games with players at the same keyboard for input. During this time, Jellyvision reinvented itself as Jellyvision Labs, offering its services in business-to-business communication including for tax software from H&R Block and interviews for Equifax.

Around 2008, the company saw that gaming consoles had developed features for connectivity and social play. They also recognized that the market for such trivia games was slim at the time and saw a possible opportunity to revitalize the series. Near this time, Jellyvision Labs was spun out to its own company, Jellyvision Games, LLC, which would later be reincorporated in 2011 as Jellyvision Games, Inc. Harry Nathan Gottlieb, the founder of Jellyvision, recognized that many of the same people that worked on the original games were still in the company, and proposed the idea of a new You Don't Know Jack title to publishers. After securing THQ as a publisher, full-time development for the game started in February 2010. Steve Heinrich, the game's producer, said the development process was "insanely quick", allowing them to work concurrently on writing, art, sound, and programming, and had the flexibility to make design decisions to keep the game simple and funny. However, the question writing staff found some of the deadlines to be too short, preventing them from doing extensive audience feedback.

Jellyvision Games did not want to change much of the older games for the 2011 version. They sought to keep as many of the old game question types, such as the Jack Attack and Dis Or Dat questions, updating the games to support online play. To counterbalance other types that would not be playable on consoles, such as Gibberish Questions that required players to type in a phrase, the developers added new features to the game, such as the Wrong Answer of the Game. The developers took advantage of other features of the newer consoles: they were able to use rumble features of console controllers to emphasize the effect of Screwing other players, and wrote several humorous titles for the in-game achievements.

Allard Laban of Jellyvision Games noted that compared to 1995, where the pop culture was "fragmented", the onset of the Internet and social media made it easier to develop questions for the game. At the same time, with more information and entertainment available, the writers had to be selective about what parts of culture would remain relevant; an example given by Heinrich was that while questions about Seinfeld were okay, questions about Mad About You were not. Jellyvision Games sought comedy writers, including from local comedy clubs such as Second City and I.O., narrowing down the pool of applicants from hundreds to six, including Second City comedian Tim Sniffen, who had worked on previous iterations of the You Don't Know Jack series. A weekly training process was employed to bring the new writers up to speed and review previously written dialog for possible improvements. Heinrich also assured that material was not repeated throughout the game's script. Heinrich estimates that each question in the game was a result of about two hours of work.

The majority of the game's dialogue is provided by Harry Nathan Gottlieb's brother Tom, who had voiced the emcee "Cookie" Masterson in the earlier games, and had been considered one of the more popular emcees by players. Lacking any professional studio, most of the 100-200 hrs of game dialog were recorded in a makeshift soundproofed closet. Tom Gottlieb was also involved in the writing process, as Jellyvision Games credits much of the "Cookie" persona to his own performance of the character. Other sound effects include fake commercials that are heard before and after a game; some of these include commercials used in previous iterations of the You Don't Know Jack series. Prior to each questions, the game includes short musical interstitials with animated numbers to introduce the question via its number. These were designed as to get the music for these stuck in the players' heads as something they would remember throughout the day; to avoid making these become too routine, certain episodes featured variations on the interstitial that would be unexpected, keeping players on their toes throughout playing the game.

The game was released in North America on February 8, 2011. Shortly after, Jellyvision Games stated they considered further international releases, but these would be too expensive at the present time. The company would not rule out future iterations of the game being released to a wider market based on the success of this title.

An initial version of this version of You Don't Know Jack was released for iOS systems in April 2011. It featured twenty 10-question episodes, but was limited to a single-player mode. Jellyvision Games later pulled the application, in anticipation of release of a more robust client for both iOS and Android that would mimic the Facebook application, featuring cross-platform multiplayer between iOS, Android, and Facebook versions, and downloadable episodes from the Facebook game.

== Reception ==
Reception

Aggregate scores
Aggregator	Score
GameRankings	83.17% (Note: Based on 6 reviews)
Metacritic	83/100 (360)

Review scores
Publication	Score
G4	4/5 (360, PS3)
Game Informer	8.0/10
GamePro	2.5/5 (360, PS3)
GameSpot	8.0/10 (360, PS3, Wii); 7.0/10
IGN	8.5/10 (360, PS3); 6.0/10

You Don't Know Jack was positively received by critics who were delighted not only with a new entry in the series, but one that kept the same humor and wit as the earlier games. Seth Schiesel of The New York Times praised the "triumphant, hilarious and even enlightening return" of the series, citing the creativity of the writing and voice work. John Teti of The A.V. Club called the title an "astonishingly good game", and was impressed that the writing of the game was as witty as the previous games in the series despite the years of dormancy. Though Teti lamented the lack of keyboard-based questions, he praised the new question types and gameplay as the overall change "minimizes blowouts and keeps the pace brisk". Greg Miller of IGN considered the game a great value, attributing it to the game's "great sense of humor, clever rounds and enough questions to keep you busy for a while".

Kevin Kelly of G4 TV praised the voice work, particularly that for "Cookie", as "Without Cookie, this game would quickly be just another forgettable trivia game". Jeff Cork of Game Informer considered the game "proof that games don't need to be excessively complex in order to be fun", complimenting the "top-notch" writing. Chris Watters of GameSpot commented that the structure of each episode can become repetitive, and that commonly the Jack Attack round would decide the winner of the game, negating the previous questions, but still considered the "large amount of legitimately clever and surprisingly funny writing" a key aspect of making You Don't Know Jack as "one of the most entertaining trivia games on the market". GamePro's Nathan Grayson was more critical of the game's lack of features, considering the number of questions "painfully short" compared to the Buzz! trivia game series, the "absolute bare-bones basics" presentation, and the game's somewhat juvenile sense of humor. Though the Toronto Sun's Steve Tilley generally praised the game's humor, he noted the lack of variety of gameplay modes, and that playing with people online may be spoiled by those that had already run through all the game's episodes.

Both the Microsoft Windows and Nintendo DS versions were criticized for limiting the number of players to two. The Windows version was particularly criticized as it did not allow for online play, a feature available on the Xbox 360 and PlayStation 3 releases, nor would receive the downloadable content for the game. The lack of multiplayer in the pulled iOS version was lamented though the other facets of the game's humor remained.
