= Jackbox Games =

American video game developer

Jackbox Games, Inc.
- Formerly: Learn Television (1989–1995); Jellyvision Games (1995–2001, 2008–2013)
- Type: Private
- Industry: Video games
- Founded: 1989 (historical); 2008 (current incarnation)
- Founder: Harry Nathan Gottlieb
- Headquarters: Chicago, Illinois, U.S.
- Area served: Worldwide
- Key people: Mike Bilder (CEO); Allard Laban (CCO)
- Products: You Don't Know Jack; (1995–2018); The Jackbox Party Pack; (2014–present)
- Number of employees: 40 (2020)
- Parent: The Jellyvision Lab (2008–2011)
- Website: jackboxgames.com

Jackbox Games, Inc. (formerly Jellyvision Games, Inc.) is an American video game developer based in Chicago, Illinois, best known for the You Don't Know Jack series of quiz-based party video games and The Jackbox Party Pack series. Founded by Harry Nathan Gottlieb, the company operated as Jellyvision Games from 1995 until its closure in 2001. After seven years of dormancy, Jellyvision Games was revived in 2008, and the company rebranded as Jackbox Games in 2013.

== History ==
Jackbox Games was founded in 1989 by Harry Nathan Gottlieb as an educational entertainment company called Learn Television. Prior to developing You Don't Know Jack, the company created a children's trivia game called That's a Fact, Jack!. In 1995, the company rebranded as Jellyvision Games and developed the first edition of You Don't Know Jack; originally a PC game, its success established a franchise, and Jellyvision produced numerous installments of You Don't Know Jack from 1995 through 1998. From 1999 to 2001, Jellyvision developed five games based on the American version of Who Wants to Be a Millionaire, all of them featuring Regis Philbin's likeness and voice. The first of these adaptations – Who Wants to Be a Millionaire – was published by Disney Interactive, while the later four were published by Buena Vista Interactive which had just been spun off from DI when it reestablished itself in attempts to diversify its portfolio. Of the five games, three featured general trivia questions, one was sports-themed, and another was a "Kids Edition" featuring easier questions.

In 2001, the computer game market shifted, as players moved from personal computers to home consoles of the sixth generation, affecting the demand for CD-ROM games. Jellyvision attempted to enter the marketplace with console-based versions of You Don't Know Jack, but these games were unsuccessful. Jellyvision Games was shelved, and the following year Gottlieb launched a new company called the Jellyvision Lab. Pivoting away from games, the Jellyvision Lab focused on business software, developing a technology called the "interactive conversation interface" inspired by the voice-driven interface of You Don't Know Jack. These interactive conversation products were a success, in part because of the You Don't Know Jack series' popularity.

In 2008, as networked consoles and mobile devices became popular, Jellyvision Games was relaunched as a subsidiary of the Jellyvision Lab, hiring Mike Bilder to lead the studio. The company released an iOS application of You Don't Know Jack and, in partnership with THQ, a console version in 2011. The studio later developed a Facebook version of the game, allowing them to continuously provide new trivia; later, the game expanded to include a standalone mobile application that allows data sharing and competition with the Facebook version. The game, now defunct, was awarded the "Social Game of the Year" at the 2012 Spike Video Game Awards.

Near the end of 2011, Jellyvision Games was spun off into a separate company. The studio rebranded as Jackbox Games in June 2013, and announced that it would continue to focus on developing social games, for mobile devices and home entertainment devices like Roku and Ouya.

During this time, the company allowed the game to be played using smartphones and tablets as controllers, rather than actual game controllers. Jackbox released more apps including Clone Booth (a humorous photo-manipulation app) and the games Lie Swatter (a find-the-lies game of unusual facts) and Word Puttz (a word game). The studio released Fibbage: The Hilarious Bluffing Party Game on the Amazon Fire TV and as a digital-only title on Xbox One, PlayStation 3 and PlayStation 4 in September 2014.

Fibbage proved successful with players, particularly using streaming media services like Twitch. In October 2014, the company packaged Fibbage, You Don't Know Jack, and three other games that were designed to be played with others over a stream. This was the first Jackbox Party Pack, and they have continued working on this approach, releasing a new Party Pack each year, except in 2024.

Around mid-March 2020, Jackbox Games experienced a large increase in traffic due to the stay-at-home limitations of the COVID-19 pandemic.

The team currently produces videos and live streams dubbed "The Jackbox Party Club" in which the producers, designers and team of the games play together along with the audience.

== Games developed ==
=== You Don't Know Jack series (2011–2013) ===
Jackbox Games was founded to bring back Jellyvision's premiere title, You Don't Know Jack, which prior to 2011 had not been published since 2002. The revival sought to take advantage of newer technologies such as modern consoles and mobile gaming tied with Facebook integration. Jackbox Games brought three of these standalone titles to market:

- You Don't Know Jack – 2011 – For personal computers and consoles
- You Don't Know Jack (Facebook) – 2012 – Via Facebook integration, and later to include tie-in iOS/Android versions.
- You Don't Know Jack Party – 2013 – For Amazon Fire TV and iPad

=== The Jackbox Party Pack series (2014–present) ===
The Jackbox Party Pack games are individual collections of five party games per pack, designed for online play by multiple people, including large audiences, via streaming websites like Twitch. Packs follow a loose format, with every pack generally including at least one sequel (until the tenth pack), drawing game, and writing game. Since 2014, Jackbox has released a new set of games in these packs each year, with a total of 12 packs available as of 2026.

=== Standalone games ===
Jackbox Games developed additional games initially geared to mobile devices after the success of the Facebook-based You Don't Know Jack game. These have been released as individual titles, while some were then featured as part of The Jackbox Party Pack.

==== Lie Swatter (2013) ====
Lie Swatter is a single-player game for mobile devices that presents the player with a number of statements which may be true or false, and the player is required to determine which ones are lies and "swat" them. The player earns points for correctly guessed answers (i.e. not swatting true statements and swatting false ones).

The first Jackbox Party Pack includes a multiplayer version of Lie Swatter, which supports up to 100 players. A hands-free version with Amazon Alexa was also released.

==== Clone Booth (2013) ====
Clone Booth was a photo app for mobile devices that allowed one person to take a photo and then have that digitally manipulated into a number of stock historical images which then could be shared via mobile devices.

==== Word Puttz (2013) ====
Word Puttz was a single-player game for mobile devices. On each level, the player is presented with a miniature golf hole, including a tee and a cup; other obstacles may also be present. The objective is to create words using a given set of letter tiles to create a path from the tee to the hole, in the manner of Scrabble. The player is scored based on how few words they use, as well as point values of those letters in the words.

==== Fibbage (2014) ====
Fibbage is a party game released for PlayStation 3, PlayStation 4, and Xbox One on September 16, 2014. The game is played by at least two players and up to eight players via a streaming channel. It is broken into three rounds. In the first two rounds, each player has an opportunity to pick one of five randomly generated categories, and then all players are presented with an obscure fact with a missing word or phrase. Each player secretly provides the answer to the missing phrase, trying to craft an answer that appears legitimate. If players enter the correct answer, they are told of this and encouraged to enter a false answer. If a player doesn't enter a legitimate answer before the timer runs out, they can press the "lie for me" button and get two choices. The game then presents all players' answers and the correct answer randomly. Players must then select the correct answer. If the player selected the correct answer, they score points, while if other players have selected that player's fake answer, they also score points for each player that selected their answer. If the player selected the lie the game wrote itself, they lose points. In the final round called "The Final Fibbage", the game provides one last question for all players to answer. The player with the most points at the end wins. Following each question, players have the opportunity to mark one or more answers as favorites, and the player with the most favorites is shown at the end of the game.

Improved versions of Fibbage, offering new questions/prompts and additional features, are included in various Jackbox Party Packs.

==== Quiplash (2015) ====
Quiplash is a party game released for Windows, OS X, PlayStation 3, PlayStation 4, and Xbox One on June 30, 2015. The game is played by at least three players and up to eight players via a streaming channel. It is broken into three rounds. In the first two rounds, players are given two prompts to supply a humorous answer for; each prompt is seen by two random players. Then, the prompt and the two provided answers are shown, and the other players and the audience vote on which is funnier, with the players that provided the answers given points on how many votes they get. If a player's answer gets all of the other players' votes and, if there is an audience, a majority of the audience's votes, that player gets a "quiplash" and earns bonus points. However, if two players that see the same prompt enter the same thing, they get a "jinx" and they don't get any points. The final round called "The Last Lash" has all players reply to the same prompt, and players subsequently select three of the answers as the funniest. The player with the most points at the end wins.

Quiplash is the first game to feature an audience. Jackbox Games used a Kickstarter approach to fund development of the game, with the March 2015 campaign seeking US$15,000 and finishing with over US$30,000 from over 1,600 backers. Enhanced versions of Quiplash featuring new prompts and additional features are included in various Jackbox Party Packs.

==== Drawful 2 (2016) ====
Drawful 2 is a standalone game released for Windows, OS X, PlayStation 4, and Xbox One on June 21, 2016, and for the Nintendo Switch on June 21, 2018. It follows the same format of Drawful from the first Jackbox Party Pack and is played by at least three players and up to eight players. Players are presented with a silly phrase they must try to draw out on a canvas. The picture is then shown to all players, who attempt to guess the original phrase, with points awarded to players who select that phrase, and to players who have their response voted as the "correct" phrase. Drawful 2 adds new features, such as allowing players to use two colors for their drawings. The game includes support for user-generated phrases which are created in a similar party-oriented manner as the game itself, which then can be shared with other players via a code.

==== Quiplash 2: InterLASHional (2020) ====
Quiplash 2 InterLASHional was released on April 8, 2020, as a newer version of Quiplash 2 that was originally released in 2016 as part of The Jackbox Party Pack 3. Jackbox developed the InterLASHional version following the onset of the COVID-19 pandemic that forced many people to stay home due to resulting lockdown restrictions; the various Jackbox Party Packs had become popular games played over streaming network services to help people pass the time and created a large influx of players. Jackbox saw that many of these were non-English speakers, leading them to decide to create a standalone version of Quiplash 2 with translations for French, Italian, German, and Spanish in addition to English.

==== The Jackbox Survey Scramble (2024) ====
The Jackbox Survey Scramble is a standalone game released for PlayStation 4, PlayStation 5, Xbox One, and Nintendo Switch on October 24, 2024. Based on The Poll Mine from The Jackbox Party Pack 8, the game requires two players and supports up to ten players.

==== Trivia Murder Party 3 (2026) ====
Trivia Murder Party 3 is a standalone game in the Trivia Murder Party series played by up to eight players. It was originally announced in April 2025 for release in Fall 2025, but in July 2025, the game's release was delayed to 2026. A demo for the game was available during Steam Next Fest from June 15 to 22, 2026, with early access beginning on Steam and the Epic Games store on September 17, 2026, and a full release scheduled for 2027 on PlayStation 5, Xbox Series X/S and Nintendo Switch 2.

==== Fakin' It XL (2026) ====
Fakin' It XL is an expansion of Fakin' It from The Jackbox Party Pack 3. It was released on Nintendo Switch, PC, PlayStation 5 and Xbox Series X/S on November 12, 2026. The game expands on the original with support for up to eight players, a "remote play" mode that can be played on a stream, and new categories, all of which were previously featured in its follow-up Fakin' It All Night Long from The Jackbox Naughty Pack.

== Games published ==
Jackbox entered the market as a publisher for third-party titles in March 2026, starting with My Arms Are Longer Now from Toot Games. Vice president of publishing for Jackbox, Andy Kniaz, said that the studio wanted to support smaller games with humorous elements, similar to games like Thank Goodness You're Here and Baby Steps.
