= You Don't Know Jack (1999 video game) =

- Developers: Berkeley Systems; Jellyvision; Starsphere Interactive
- Publishers: NA: Sierra Attractions; DE: Rockstar Games
- Series: You Don't Know Jack
- Platform: PlayStation
- Release: NA: November 1999; DE: April 21, 2001
- Genre: Party video game
- Modes: Single-player, multiplayer

You Don't Know Jack is a party video game developed by Berkeley Systems, Jellyvision and Starsphere Interactive, and published by Sierra Attractions for the PlayStation in 1999. A European release followed under Take-Two Interactive's Rockstar Games subsidiary in 2001, which was released exclusively in Germany.

== Reception ==
Reception

Aggregate score
Aggregator	Score
GameRankings	86%

Review scores
Publication	Score
AllGame	3.5/5
CNET Gamecenter	6/10
Electronic Gaming Monthly	9.5/10 (Note: In Electronic Gaming Monthly's review of the game, one critic gave it 9.5/10, another gave it 8.5/10, and the rest gave it each a score of a perfect 10/10.)
EP Daily	9/10
Game Informer	8/10
GameSpot	7.4/10
IGN	8.2/10
Next Generation	4/5
Official U.S. PlayStation Magazine	4.5/5
PlayStation: The Official Magazine	4/5

The game received favorable reviews according to the review aggregation website GameRankings. Chris Charla of NextGen said, "With support for three players (the multi-tap is supported, but three can play with two controllers) and two discs of questions, this game should rival PaRappa as one of the best PlayStation party games around." Some other magazines gave it favorable reviews months before the game was released Stateside.
