= Use Your Words =

2017 video game

- Developer: Smiling Buddha Games
- Publisher: Screenwave Media
- Designer: Brent Black
- Programmers: Julian Spillane; Derek Gallant
- Artist: Kai Salminen
- Platforms: Windows macOS; PlayStation 4 Xbox One; Wii U Nintendo Switch
- Release: Windows, macOS, PlayStation 4, Xbox One: WW: April 4, 2017; Wii U: WW: April 27, 2017; Nintendo Switch: WW: August 3, 2017
- Genre: Party
- Mode: Multiplayer

Use Your Words is a party video game developed by Smiling Buddha Games and published by Screenwave Media. It was released for Windows, macOS, PlayStation 4, Xbox One, and Wii U in April 2017, and for the Nintendo Switch in August 2017.

== Gameplay ==
Use Your Words is a game for 3–6 players and is played similar to The Jackbox Party Pack in that players play on a browser with web-enabled devices. Four mini-games are played throughout a single game:

- Sub the Title: A small clip from a foreign film is shown with a missing subtitle and players are invited to write their own subtitle in its place.
- Extra! Extra!: An image–typically outlandish in nature–is presented, and players are tasked with writing a newspaper-style headline for it.
- Blank-O-Matic: Players are shown an unfinished sentence and asked to fill in the blank.
- Survey Says: The final round. Here, players write funny responses to three different prompts in the style of Family Feud.

In any given round, players vote on their favorite answer (or the answer they consider to be the most strategically advantageous), and players whose answers receive votes are awarded points. Points are also deducted from a player's score if they vote for a House Answer. House answers are built-in answers written by the development team and designed to add an element of chaos as well as additional comedy to the mix. At the end of the game, the player with the most points wins. The game also has a "Spectator Mode" where additional participants can provide "reactions" to each player answer, and their reactions contribute to various awards players can receive at the end of a party match.

== Development ==
In 2015, designer Brent Black and veteran game developer Julian Spillane came together to create the game, which the former pitched as "a party game for funny people and their unfunny friends."

== Reception ==
Reception

Aggregate score
Aggregator	Score
Metacritic	NS: 74/100

Review scores
Publication	Score
Destructoid	3/10
Nintendo Life	NS: 8/10
Nintendo World Report	NS: 8/10

The Switch version of Use Your Words received "mixed or average" reviews, according to review aggregator Metacritic. Nintendo Life scored the Switch version 8 out of 10, saying the game is best played in the comfort of a local crowd. Nintendo World Report also rated the Switch version 8/10, praising it as "accessible" and "fun," but criticizing the lack of an option to change text size for playing in portable mode. On the opposite end, Destructoid rated the game 3/10, comparing the gameplay to simply riffing on foreign films or randomly Googled images.

== Sequel ==
A Kickstarter campaign to fund the development of Use Your Words 2 successfully raised over $58,000 in June 2022. The amount met stretch goals to include features where players can select which mini-games are played as well as an improved, interactive, spectator mode. Stretch goals for the game to release on Nintendo Switch and Xbox consoles were also met. The game was released on Steam on December 23, 2024, after a successful Kickstarter funding campaign.
