= You Don't Know Jack (game show) =

TV game show

- Genre: Game show Comedy
- Directed by: Keith Truesdell
- Presented by: Paul Reubens
- Announcer: Tom Gottlieb
- Theme music composer: Ebon Schletter
- Composer: Ebon Schletter
- Country of origin: United States
- Original language: English
- No. of seasons: 1
- No. of episodes: 6

Production
- Executive producers: Marcy Carsey; Andrew J. Golder; Caryn Mandabach; Robert Morton; Tom Werner
- Producer: Denis Biggs
- Editor: Matt Davis
- Running time: 30 min.
- Production companies: Jellyvision; Carsey-Werner-Mandabach; Panamort Television

Original release
- Network: ABC
- Release: June 20 – July 18, 2001

You Don't Know Jack is an American game show based on the video game series of the same name which aired on ABC in 2001. Paul Reubens played host Troy Stevens. Tom Gottlieb reprised his role as Cookie Masterson, who was the announcer. The show lasted six episodes.

== Development ==
The franchise of You Don't Know Jack began with CD-ROM-based trivia games for computers in 1996. Development had begun in 1997, but was halted for several years as Paul Reubens, whom the developers selected as host, was uncertain about accepting a role outside his character Pee-Wee Herman. Despite this reluctance, he ultimately agreed to do the show, and production began in 2001.

== Format ==
Three contestants competed for the first three rounds, with only two going on to the final "Jack Attack" round.

=== Round One ===
In Round One, Stevens asked a series of toss-up questions, usually worth $1,000 each, although some opening questions were asked for lower amounts. Most questions were multiple choice as in the computer games, but some were open-ended. The first contestant to buzz in and answer correctly won the money, but there was no penalty for a miss.

After three questions at most, a "DisOrDat" challenge was played with a format similar to the computer games. Stevens gave two answer choices and read a series of six facts, and the contestants had to decide whether each fact corresponded to the first answer, the second, or both. Correct answers were worth $1,000 each, while a miss deducted $1,000 and immediately took that fact out of play.

=== Round Two ===
Round Two began with a series of toss-ups as in Round One, but worth $2,000 each, and ended with a "$2,000,000 Question" instead of DisOrDat. The value of this question started at $2,000,000, but decreased rapidly over time as soon as Stevens began to read it. While he was doing so, a lengthy distraction would occur, such as Stevens being attacked by ninjas, setting the question card on fire, or fighting for possession of the card with a dog. During this time, the value continued to decrease; it would typically be under $200 when he finally finished reading the question. Whoever eventually answered the question correctly won the remaining money. A wrong answer gave the opponents a chance to steal the money, but the value would keep decreasing until someone responded correctly.

=== Round Three ===
Round Three featured questions worth $3,000 apiece, one of which was always in the category "Things That Sound Dirty But Aren't."

The final question, worth $5,000, required the contestants to carry out a lengthy series of mathematical calculations that combined facts and pop culture references. All operations had to be performed in the order Stevens read them. (E.g. the unit number on M*A*S*H, added to the number of digits in a U.S. Social Security number, minus the number of Beatles on the cover of The White Album, divided by the number represented by a roll of "snake eyes." The answer would be (4077 + 9 - 0) / 2 = 2043.) They were given dry-erase boards and markers to use in solving the problem and had 30 seconds to write down their responses; during this time, though, a distraction would take place such as Taylor doing stand up comedy badly ], a mariachi band, or a group of children poorly playing Twinkle, Twinkle, Little Star on violins. Once time ran out, each contestant who had written the correct answer received $5,000 and the one with the lowest total was eliminated from the game, receiving a consolation prize. The elimination was frequently accompanied by a CGI effect such as a vortex that appeared to swallow the contestant.

If there was a tie for low score, Stevens asked a sudden-death toss-up question to break it. A correct answer kept the contestant in the game, but a miss eliminated them.

=== Jack Attack ===
The two remaining contestants were given a category and shown a series of clues, one at a time, with Stevens' face appearing on the screen as a distraction while possible answers flew past him. The object was to buzz in when a displayed answer fit both the category and the clue; successfully doing so added $5,000 to a contestant's score, while a miss deducted $5,000. After six clues, the contestant with the higher score won the game and received their final total in cash, while the other contestant received a consolation prize.

== Critical reception ==
The show received a mixed review from Tom Jicha of the South Florida Sun Sentinel, who wrote, "The goal is clearly summertime fun, and Jack hits the mark. Nevertheless, it's hard to imagine a show so slight becoming this off-season's Millionaire or even impressing enough to win a berth in the regular season lineup. Then again, critics sometimes don't know jack."
