= Brentalfloss =

American musician (born 1984)

brentalfloss
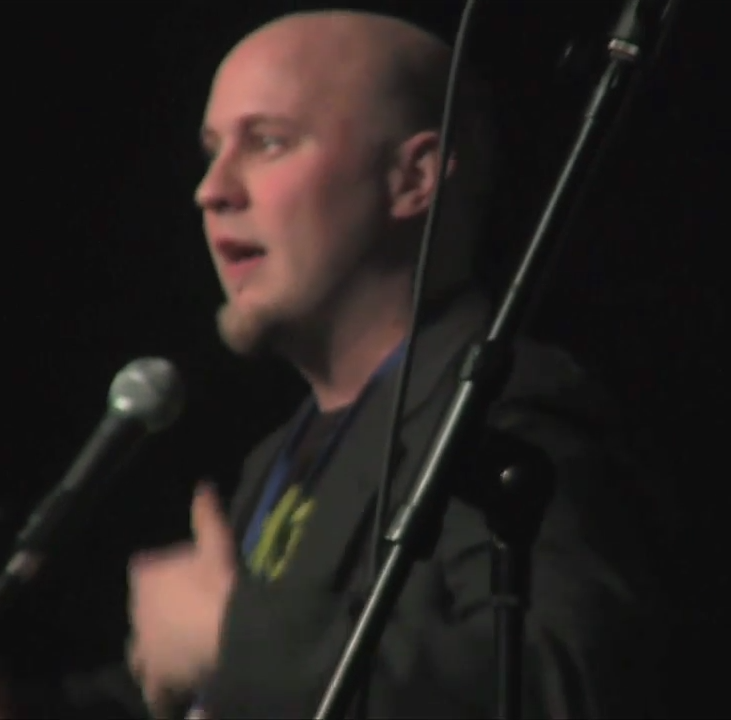
- Black at MAGFest in 2013

Background information
- Born: Brent Black; April 12, 1984 (age 42); Irving, Texas, United States
- Genres: Comedy; video game music
- Occupations: Composer, songwriter, lyricist, singer
- Instruments: Piano, vocals
- Years active: 2006–present (ScrewAttack, since 2007 on Brentalfloss)
- Partner: Lauren Whittenberger (eng. 2026)
- Website: www.brentalfloss.com

Brent Black (born April 12, 1984), also known as brentalfloss, is a musician who adds lyrics to compositions from video game titles, such as Mike Tyson's Punch-Out, Mega Man 2, and Donkey Kong Country. He also has original songs for his albums and some on YouTube, such as "This is the Album You've Been Waiting For", "The BrentalFloss Comic Song", and his first song, "The Dreamer". He wrote this song when he was 12, and his sister named it.

Black was born in Dallas, Texas. He received his undergraduate degree at the University of Oklahoma and went on to earn his master's degree in musical theatre writing at New York University. In his time at NYU, he co-wrote a musical with composer Rob Broadhurst called "I’ll Be Damned", which had a limited Off-Broadway run at the Vineyard Theatre in New York City in 2010.

== Career ==
=== YouTube career ===
Black is best known for adding lyrics to video game music. His first "with lyrics" video he made was based on the title theme of Mega Man 3 for the Nintendo Entertainment System. Black's website indicates that his stage name "brentalfloss" is always intentionally spelled with lower-case letters. Black also appears as one of the principal actors in the web series My Life as a Video Game in the role of Menu, a supercomputer A.I. In 2012, Black collaborated with Pat Contri for "Nintendohemian Rhapsody", a parody of Queen's "Bohemian Rhapsody" themed around classic NES games and their perceived higher difficulty compared to modern games.

=== Beyond YouTube ===
Black has also released studio albums. His first CD, What If This CD... Had Lyrics? was released in the spring of 2010. It contains re-recorded and re-mastered versions of every song of his "With Lyrics" series that was released at that time, plus additional CD-exclusive songs. It features fellow video game bands The Megas and The Konami Kode, with tracks peaking in the top 100 on iTunes comedy charts worldwide. He has also released a G-Rated and instrumental version of the album. In early 2011, he released The Super-Secret EP under the pseudonym "DJ Super Secret", which was revealed to members of his mailing list first, and was released to public afterwards. Black later set up a fundraising page on his site to try to garner funds for a second CD, which reached its goal of $4000. The CD was completed in March 2012, but was unable to be released until June 2012 due to printing errors. He released digital downloads for Bits of Me on June 8, 2012. In February 2014, Black released his third studio album, Flossophy.

Black also appeared in three Nostalgia Critic reviews of Superbabies: Baby Geniuses 2, Moulin Rouge!, and Les Misérables, as well as Paw Dugan's review of Dr. Horrible's Sing-Along Blog. The official soundtrack is available.

Black formerly produced a Brentalfloss webcomic series as well, running from 2012 to 2013 and concluding after its 200th entry.

From 2015 to 2020, Black co-hosted a podcast on Maximum Fun, titled "Trends Like These", in which he, his former college roommate Travis McElroy, and journalist Courtney Enlow discussed topics and issues trending on social media websites. In July 2019, he began a podcast with Kate Sloan called Question Box.

From 2015 to release in 2017, he designed, produced, and launched a video game titled Use Your Words alongside veteran game developer Julian Spillane, who pitched the game as "a party game for funny people and their unfunny friends.".

In 2019, he announced he is producing the soundtrack for a multi-platform cat-themed adventure platform game titled A Purrtato Tail.

== Personal life ==
On November 9, 2026, Black got engaged to singer and theater performer Lauren Whittenberger after four years of dating.

== Discography ==
=== Albums ===
- What If This CD... Had Lyrics? (2010)
- What If This CD... Had G-Rated Lyrics? (2011)
- Bits of Me (2012)
- Flossophy (2014)

=== EPs ===
- The Super-Secret EP (as DJ Super-Secret) (2011)

=== Compilation albums ===
- The YouTube Collection 2008-2012 (2013)
