= My Life as a Video Game =

- Genre: Action-Comedy
- Created by: Petros L. Ioannou
- Directed by: Brian Dickson; Nicholas Holmes; Lex Nakashima
- Starring: Petros L. Ioannou; Jennifer Polansky; Brent Black
- Composer: Kevin Penkin
- Countries of origin: United Kingdom; United States
- Original language: English
- No. of seasons: 1
- No. of episodes: 11

Production
- Producers: Petros L. Ioannou; Brian Dickson; April Joy Haddad
- Production locations: Los Angeles, California; London, England
- Editors: Petros L. Ioannou; Nicky Mabbs
- Running time: 7–13 minutes

Original release
- Network: YouTube
- Release: November 12, 2013

My Life as a Video Game is a British/American action-comedy web series created and written by Petros L. Ioannou, who also stars as the protagonist Don DeWitt. It is premiered on the LeonUnity channel on YouTube on November 12, 2013, with its first trailer airing simultaneously on the brentalfloss channel and LeonUnity channels on YouTube on April 27, 2013 The show was funded using Kickstarter

The story revolves around Don DeWitt (Petros L. Ioannou), an obsessed gamer pulled into an alternate reality where video games are real life. There he meets Kera Althorn (Jennifer Polansky), a fallen space Princess trying to reclaim her throne from the General who overthrew and murdered her family. With the help of Kera's "MENU System" (Brent Black) a portable A.I. with a snarky sense of humour. Don and Kera travel to various video game worlds, first-person shooters, beat 'em ups, space combat simulators, RPGs, platformers, racing and much more, in an attempt to bring an alliance of video game champions together to take back her throne and help Don grow from hapless boy into heroic man in order to find his way home.

== Plot ==
=== Season 1 (2013) ===
The first season revolves around Don being pulled into the alternate reality where video games are real life. The first world is pulled into is called "The Warzone" and is based on the first-person shooter genre of video games. The second arc takes place in a world based on the beat 'em up genre of video games that were popular in the 1980s. The third arc was revealed to be based on the space combat/shooter genre in a YouTube preview.

== Characters and cast ==
=== Main cast ===
Don DeWitt is a child of the Nintendo Generation. He was raised on a diet of video games from Mario to Call of Duty, Final Fantasy to Double Dragon and everything in between. His father got him his first ever gaming console, an original NES, when he was just a kid. After his father died, Don's prevalent memory of his departed father was playing video games with him as a kid.

Since then he's grown up with his left thumb on a directional pad and his right thumb on the A button. Always so involved in gaming that he neglected the outside world, never realized the potential he had to be somebody and slowly started to feel like an outcast. Even his favorite social spot is a Gamer Bar in his home city of London.

Don one day is pulled him into an alternate reality where the video games are real life. At first this could be a dream come true for Don, he's now standing in the worlds that he could only explore through a television screen before... but soon he realizes this is far from a dream-scenario, because if he is killed now, it truly is Game Over. Don is portrayed by series creator Petros L. Ioannou

Kera Althorn is only child of the Emperor of the Great Interstellar Althorn Empire, is a young woman who as her title would suggest had everything. She was always taken care of, never had to lift a finger to do anything . But it wasn't to last...

When a military coup broke out led by the brutal General Atticus Dynas and Kera's family was overthrown and killed, Kera was thrown into a prison cell. Kera wasn't going to take this lying down though. She might not have been active in the past but she was sure as hell going to do something about it now.

Kera breaks out of prison using the help of her family's personal M.E.N.U, a sentient super-computer, and steals an old ambassadorial ship called "The Fortress" and flies away. Kera remembers one thing, the story of the Grand Champion, who united all the video game heroes once to combat an impossible threat. She now travels from world to world seeking alliances with the Champions to take back her throne as she truly becomes a self-sufficient soldier. Kera is portrayed by Jennifer Polansky

M.E.N.U (or simply Menu) is the Multi-Electrical Networked User System is a highly sophisticated sentient super-computer that can process at twenty-trillion petaflops and contains virtually the entire database of the Althorn Empire stored in its drives, yet still finds the time to make the occasional sarcastic remark, witty retort and highly refined dick, butt or fart joke.

Loyal to Kera's family, Menu was a super computer designed to make their lives easier, and while in most science fiction that means he's going to turn evil, Menu is quite the opposite. In fact when everyone turned against the Royal Family, Menu stuck with Kera and now aids her on her quest to bring down her father's murderer.

Menu often appears as a floating head and hands on a screen, be it on the ship The Fortress, or on Kera and Don's wrist mounted portable system. He acts as an interface helping the heroes to communicate and is always on hand with a wise-crack or two or six. Menu is portrayed by brentalfloss.

== History ==
My Life as a Video Game was originally conceived by writer Petros L. Ioannou, as a video game review show. Each review would involve his being sucked into the game he was reviewing good or bad to point out the flaws. However slowly as it developed, Ioannou decided to make it more of a scripted comedy show with an ongoing storyline and soon reviewer element was removed entirely in favour of a more plot and character driven narrative that would seek to analyse and poke fun at gaming culture on a whole, while creating its own universe. This also would allow him to analyse gaming genres from the past, that might not be as common anymore such as the beat 'em up and more modern ones such as the first-person shooter.

=== Kickstarter ===
On October 21, 2013, Leon Films, with a video from producer Petros L. Ioannou and co-star Brent Black, launched a crowdfunding effort for My Life as a Video Game on Kickstarter with 35 days to reach a goal of $30,000. With the help of a video from Black on his channel. released about two weeks into the Kickstarter, the project reached is goal and raised $32,314 in total.

== Format ==
The show is based around "arcs", each corresponding to three episodes of a story roughly ten minutes in length. Together they combine one television length episode for easier viewing together. The only exception to this is the pilot episode which stands alone, though is considered to be part of the first-person shooter arc that takes place immediately afterward.
