= You Don't Know Jack (Facebook game) =

2012 video game

- Developer: Jackbox Games
- Publisher: Jackbox Games
- Series: You Don't Know Jack
- Platforms: Browser, iOS, Android
- Release: Facebook: WW: May 26, 2012; iOS: WW: December 13, 2012; Android: WW: May 21, 2013
- Genre: Party
- Modes: Single-player, multiplayer

You Don't Know Jack was a Facebook game application based on the long-running series of trivia games created by Jackbox Games (formerly Jellyvision Games). It was released for public play on Facebook in May 2012 after a beta period. The game builds on the success of the relaunch of the series from the 2011 video game for consoles and personal computers, though has altered some features to work better on the social media platform. The game is presented as a fictional television show, emceed by "Cookie" Masterson; players answer five trivia questions, typically multiple-choice, during each episode, earning virtual money to track their score within the game and in the larger meta-game. Players compete asynchronously, playing alongside other participants that have already played the present episode, and later compared to the scores of their friends that play that episode later. As part of the series' theme of "high culture meeting pop culture", the questions are often phrased eloquently and combine general knowledge with contemporary entertainment and celebrities references. A mobile version for iOS was released in December 2012, and for Android in May 2013; both mobile games allowed cross-platform play with the Facebook application.

The game was praised for taking an unconventional route towards social media-based games, incorporating elements like microtransactions and interactions with friends without aggressively marketing these elements. It won the 2012 Spike Video Game Award for Best Social Game. On January 30, 2015 it was announced this version of the game would no longer be supported and would be removed from Facebook and no longer functional on mobile devices as of March 1, 2015.

== Gameplay ==
You Don't Know Jack on Facebook follows a similar format to previous games from the series, where players compete in a virtual game show hosted by the emcee "Cookie" Masterson (voiced by Jellyvision Games' Tom Gottlieb). The player competes asynchronously with other friends on Facebook or with other Facebook users in trying to earn the most virtual money from an episode.

Each episode consists of five questions. Most questions are multiple choice, where the player is given four answers to choose from within a short amount of time once the emcee has finished reading the question. The player is awarded money for selecting the right answer, and a bonus for how fast they responded; getting the wrong answer will cost the player a similar amount of money; failing to answer does not affect a player's score. Like other games in the series, the questions mix general knowledge with contemporary events, as per its tagline "where high culture meets pop culture". For example, the player may be asked how many alcoholic shots they would have to drink for each cannon shot in the 1812 Overture. Some of the multiple choice questions are based on a recurring question type throughout the episodes as well as those featured in earlier You Don't Know Jack games. For example, Anagram Questions will give players a scrambled phrase and they have to choose one of the four rearrangements, and "Funky Trash" questions will list three items claimed to be in some celebrity's garbage, and the player would be required to identify the celebrity. A new variation introduced in the Facebook game is "Elephant, Mustard, Teddy Roosevelt, or Dracula", where the answer to the question will be one of those four items.

Additional questions veer from the multiple choice format. In DisOrDat questions, players are given a list of seven words or phrases, and must determine if they belong in one of two categories, or in some cases, both. For example, players may need to identify if phrases like "Don't Spill the Beans" are names of children's board games or advice given by Dr. Phil. Gibberish Questions, returning since their absence in the 2011 edition, present the player a phrase that rhymes with a well-known saying, though phrased and punctuated without heeding the original statement. The player must type in the original saying.

The final question is always the "Jack Attack": here, the player is given a clue phrase prior to the round that indicates some relationship. The player is then given a word or phrase, after which other possible answers that match that phrase according to the clue appear briefly. The player earns money when they answer correctly and loses money if incorrect. The faces of the players that answered correctly are shown on the screen. Unlike previous versions of the Jack Attack, the player only has a single chance through all the possible answers before the next given word or phrase is provided to the player. A total of seven such words or phrases make up a Jack Attack.

Throughout the game, the player is shown the progress of five other Facebook friends or other users, randomly selected (unless a Facebook friend of a player played that episode beforehand, in which that friend would always be shown), that have already played the episode, allowing them to compare scores throughout the game. When completed, the player earns the amount of money they accumulated and an additional bonus based on where they placed. If the player's score money combined with any placement bonus results in a negative figure, the player is given a chance to spin the "Loser Wheel" and the result (usually $1, but occasionally $5,000) replaces their total. A player's friends that have already played an episode may receive additional money the next time they log into the game, if the player lost them in that episode. This virtual money is used to track the player's experience level.

As a Facebook game, players were able to play one episode for free per day, plus additional episodes by gaining experience levels or completing certain achievements within the game. They could also use real-world cash to buy Facebook credit through Facebook to access more episodes. Real-world money could also be used to buy Enhancement boosters that increase the player's earnings for a limited number of games when they are used. In August 2012, the game was revamped to include a token system, moving away from dealing with Facebook currency; tokens are earned along with in-game money for each round played, as well as for gaining experience levels, and then subsequently used to buy additional games beyond the one-free-per-day, Enhancements, and the like. This also allowed Jellyvision Games/Jackbox Games to offer temporary discounts on these items, and plan to add more features to use these tokens.

Specialty themed episodes were added in late 2012, which could be played for free while they were available or replayed later with tokens. Similarly, in February 2013, celebrity episodes were added, where players would compete virtually against a celebrity guest, and typically featuring themed questions towards that; Rich Sommer was featured in the first such episode with Adrianne Curry appearing in a later episode, with further episodes planned to rotate on a monthly basis.

iOS and Android versions of the game worked exactly the same as the Facebook version, using the player's Facebook credentials to allow cross-platform, asynchronous play. Players were not required to log in through Facebook, but were limited to playing against random opponents as opposed to friends.

In May 2013, Jellyvision Games added a 'Deluxe Package' for the game, called "You Don't Know Jack Royale". For a small fee, this package allowed players to play the game without ads, receive tokens & enhancements and earn two free games a day. The game was later revamped again to allow all plays of the game for free instead of charging a token fee for playing after the first game.

== Development ==
The Facebook version of You Don't Know Jack follows from the success of the 2011 video game for consoles and personal computers. The You Don't Know Jack brand had been on hiatus for about eight years, as Jellyvision, Jackbox Games' parent company, could not see a way to make their game work on gaming consoles. With the advent of game systems like the Wii, and the ability to have network play, Jellyvision obtained funding from THQ to revitalize the brand, and split off Jellyvision Games as its separate company. They would later rebrand Jellyvision Games to Jackbox Games in June 2013. To help write questions in a humorous format for the game, Jackbox Games brought aboard previous writers from the series as well as talent from local Chicago improv groups.

Though the console and computer version was well-received, Jackbox Games recognized that the game was still tough to sell either as a retail game or as a downloadable title. General manager for Jackbox Games, Mike Bilder, noted that "we kind of fell into that middle zone of not a digital download, but not a premiere title that gets the marketing attention and shelf space". They recognized that social-based mobile games were trending, and that they would allow Jellyvision Games "to reach a much larger install base, to provide some new social features, and being really hyper-current with things".

The game was first released in beta in early 2012. By the time the game was open to all in May 2012, they had already written about 165 episodes, and continued to plan on releasing new episodes three times a week. Jellyvision Games continued to use writers from Chicago improv tropes such as The Second City and Improv Olympic working alongside five dedicated writers to keep the questions and trivia fresh. They have employed a proprietary system that allows the writers, the voice actors (primarily Tom Gottlieb as "Cookie" Masterson), and the music and sound effects team to work quickly and collaboratively from remote locations to complete each episode. A typical episode takes from 48 to 72 hours to complete, but the system allows them to hurry an episode along depending on the freshness of the episode. Players are then presented the newest episode that they have not yet played. The online nature of the game also allows the team to make special episodes; in one case, at a request of a fan who wanted to propose to his fiancee, also an avid player of the game, Jellyvision Games worked with fan to customize an episode as to ask the question when his fiancee played the game.

In August 2012, Jellyvision Games announced they would be moving away from using Facebook credits directly, and introduce the concept of tokens as in-game currency. Tokens would be given out to players based on their performance within the game and would be used to buy additional games or Enhancers, or unlock future features as they are implemented within the game.

Mobile versions for iOS and Android devices were also developed by Jackbox Games. These versions were cross-platform compatible with the Facebook version, sharing the same episodes and allowing players on different devices to play against each other.

== Reception ==
The Facebook version of the long-running game series was seen as a strong departure from typical Facebook games that rely on microtransactions and social features for enjoyment. Ben Kuchera of Penny Arcade Reports claims that You Don't Know Jack is "the rare game that is actually better" on the Facebook and mobile platforms than the traditional console gameplay, leveraging the platform's "unique strengths" and using a common sense monetization model for both the developers and players. Kyle Orland considered the title as "proof that Facebook can be used to add real social competition to strong, proven game design", noting only that the "pay to win" nature of using real world money to buy Enhancers taint the game's success. Griffin McElroy of The Verge considered the title as "a trivia game that remains true to the series' roots with a handful of clever, unobtrusive social mechanisms tied in". Contra Costa Times' Gieson Cacho stated that the length of a typical game and the frequency of free games was appropriate for most players while still allowing those that want more to purchase as they wanted. Kirk Hamilton of Kotaku noted that with the Facebook platform, the game would indefinitely have new content to play, a limitation of any of the previous titles in the series, and the asynchronous approach "allows players to play on their own tempo but retains the feel of a live match". Kotaku subsequently called the game one of the best surprises of 2012, showing how the game remains "one of the best social games of all time".

The game was named as Best Social Game at the 2012 Spike Video Game Awards.
