= Spotlight Awards =

Former video game awards

- Date: 1997; 29 years ago
- Location: San Jose, California, U.S.

The Spotlight Awards was hosted annually by the Game Developers Conference (GDC) from 1997 to 1999. Its focus was on the video and computer game industry. GDC now hosts another video game award ceremony called Game Developers Choice Awards since 2001.

== List of winners ==
=== Best Game ===
1997 : Super Mario 64

=== Best Console Game ===
1997 : Super Mario 64
1998 : (not awarded)
1999 : The Legend of Zelda: Ocarina of Time

=== Best PC/Mac Game ===
1997 : Civilization II
1998 : (not awarded)
1999 : Half-Life

=== Best Arcade Game ===
1997 : Virtua Fighter 3

=== Best Action Game ===
1997 : Duke Nukem 3D
1998 : Quake II
1999 : Half-Life

=== Best Adventure Game/RPG ===
1997 : The Elder Scrolls II: Daggerfall
1998 : Final Fantasy VII
1999 : Baldur's Gate

=== Best Sports Game ===
1997 : NHL Hockey '97
1998 :
1999 : NFL Blitz

=== Best Multiplayer Game ===
1997 : Quake
1998 : Quake II
1999 : StarCraft

=== Best Strategy/War Game ===
1997 : Command and Conquer: Red Alert
1998 :
1999 : StarCraft

=== Best Simulation Game ===
1997 : MechWarrior 2: Mercenaries
1998 : (not awarded)
1999 : Gran Turismo

=== Best Flight or Flight Combat Simulator ===
1998 :

=== Best Military Simulation ===
1998 :

=== Best Trivia or Puzzle Game ===
1997 : You Don't Know Jack XL
1998 :
1999 : You Don't Know Jack 4: The Ride

=== Best Educational/Children's Game ===
1997 : Freddi Fish 2: The Case of the Haunted Schoolhouse
1998 :
1999 : Lego Creator

=== Best Use of Audio ===
1997 : Quake
1998 : PaRappa the Rapper
1999 : Half-Life

=== Best Music or Soundtrack ===
1997 : Quake
1998 : Blade Runner

=== Best New Technology ===
1997 : Nintendo 64 from Nintendo
1998 :

=== Best Use of Innovative Technology ===
1997 : Super Mario 64 for the N64

=== Best Use of Graphics ===
1998 : Quake II
1999 : Half-Life

=== Best Use of Video ===
1997 : Wing Commander IV

=== Most Innovative Game Design ===
1998 : PaRappa the Rapper
1999 : The Legend of Zelda: Ocarina of Time

=== Best Script, Story or Interactive Writing ===
1997 : You Don't Know Jack XL

=== Best Adaptation of Linear Media ===
1997 : I Have No Mouth, and I Must Scream

=== Best AI (Artificial Intelligence) ===
1999 : Half-Life

=== Best Animation ===
1997 : Tomb Raider

=== Best Prerendered Art ===
1997 : Zork Nemesis

=== Annual Achievement Award for Game Design and Development ===
1998 : Age of Empires

=== Lifetime Achievement Award for Game Design and Development ===
1998 : Dani Bunten Berry
1999 : Louis Castle
