= You Don't Know Jack (1995 video game) =

- Windows cover
- Developers: Jellyvision; Berkeley Systems
- Publisher: Sierra On-Line
- Series: You Don't Know Jack
- Platforms: Windows, Mac OS
- Release: October 1995
- Genre: Party
- Modes: Single-player, multiplayer

You Don't Know Jack is a party video game released in 1995 by Jellyvision, later Jackbox Games, and is the first release in the You Don't Know Jack video game series.

== History ==
Prior to developing You Don't Know Jack, Learn Television was a company focused on children's educational films. The company had begun experimenting with interactive media experiences for education, including their game That's a Fact, Jack!, a quiz game on young adult literature, which garnered attention from Berkeley Systems who later reached out to Learn Television.

In an interview, Harry Nathan Gottlieb, the founder of Learn Television, shared the following origin story for You Don't Know Jack:

"[Igor Gasowski of Berkeley Systems had] seen That's a Fact, Jack! and asked me, "You know, can you do this kind of same quiz game, but as adult entertainment?" (Not that kind of adult entertainment -- you know, entertainment for adults.)

I was not particularly interested in doing it, I'm not somebody who loves trivia games. But he kept bugging me about it, and then I had this conversation with my brother, who was my roommate at the time, his name is Tom Gottlieb. I'm like, "How can we make a trivia game funny?," cause if we could make a trivia game funny than it might be cool to do.

Then we had this idea: what if you could combine pop culture and high culture in the same question? What if there was a question about, like, both Shakespeare and The Brady Bunch. We started to come up with some questions for it and that led to this game called You Don't Know Jack, which was a trivia game for adults. But it was funny."

Igor Gasowski would end up serving as the executive producer of the game.

== Reception ==
Reception

Review scores
Publication	Score
Computer Game Review	283/300
Computer Gaming World	4.5/5
Computer and Video Games	2/5
GamePro	4/5
Next Generation	3/5
PC Gamer (US)	84%
New York Daily News	4/4

Sales of You Don't Know Jack surpassed 250,000 units by May 1996. According to market research firm PC Data, it was the 17th-best-selling computer game in the United States that year.

Mick LaSalle of the San Francisco Chronicle gave the game four stars and described it as "a hip version of Trivial Pursuit on speed." Clint Swett of The Sacramento Bee described the game as "a fast-paced, almost seamless trip into the world of game shows", and said "it's the hilarious interplay between the host and contestants that makes Jack memorably entertaining".

Reviewing the Macintosh version of the original You Don't Know Jack, a Next Generation critic praised the social nature of the game and the witty presentation. Calling it "An excellent, hip piece of work", he gave it three out of five stars. MacUser named You Don't Know Jack the best strategy game of 1995. Less favorably, Ed Lomas of Computer and Video Games found the title enjoyable, also felt the PC game format was unsuitable for an "after-pub game" like You Don't Know Jack: "there aren't going to be many people who will want to bother setting up their PC after a drinking session." To Lomas, it also did not help the jokes felt labored, "the kind of humour that will only appeal to 35-year-olds who think Hale and Pace are funny".

You Don't Know Jack won Computer Gaming World's award for the best "Classics/Puzzles" game of 1995. The editors wrote that "it's great fun watching people whiff on answers at parties", and that "anyone who's ever wanted to see game shows skewered will have a ball with this." It won Computer Game Review's 1995 "Puzzle Game of the Year" award. The editors wrote, "You Don't Know Jack did more than simply provide a fun way to spend time at the computer. It also broke a lot of conventions including the need for flashy graphics to have an exciting game." You Don't Know Jack also received Computer Game Review's "Best Voiceover Work of the Year" prize.

In 1996, Computer Gaming World declared You Don't Know Jack the 75th-best computer game ever released.

== You Don't Know Jack XL ==
You Don't Know Jack XL compiles the first You Don't Know Jack volume with an additional Question Pack.

You Don't Know Jack XL won Macworld's 1996 "Best Party Game" award. Steven Levy of the magazine wrote, "When it comes to creating a great party game that works on the computer, many have tried, and most have failed. Finally, fueled by MTV energy and Generation X cultural radar, there's You Don't Know Jack." It also won the 1996 Spotlight Awards for "Best Trivia or Puzzle Game" and "Best Script, Story or Interactive Writing" from the Game Developers Conference. The game received a score of 4.5 out of 5 from MacUser, whose editors named it one of 1996's top 50 CD-ROMs.
