= You Don't Know Jack (franchise) =

Video game series

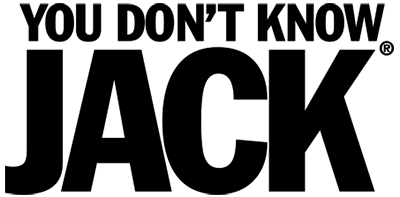
- Genre: Party
- Developers: Berkeley Systems, Jackbox Games, Starsphere Interactive, Iron Galaxy, Webfoot Technologies, Flipside.com
- Publishers: Sierra On-Line, THQ, Jackbox Games, Berkeley Systems, SPELGRIM.Com, Majesco, TopWare Interactive, Warner Bros. Games, Tsukuda Original, Telltale Publishing
- Platforms: Microsoft Windows, Macintosh, PlayStation, Xbox 360, Xbox One, PlayStation 3, PlayStation 4, Wii, Nintendo DS, iOS, Apple TV, Android, Roku, Ouya, Nintendo Switch, WebTV
- First release: You Don't Know Jack; October 22, 1995
- Latest release: You Don't Know Jack: Full Stream; October 17, 2018

You Don't Know Jack is a series of party video games developed by Jackbox Games (formerly known as Jellyvision Games) and Berkeley Systems. The series began with You Don't Know Jack (1995), and combines trivia and comedy within a game show framing device.

While it is primarily a Windows and Mac-based franchise with over two dozen releases and compilations for those platforms, there have been a few entries released for consoles: two for the original PlayStation, and the 2011 release which had versions for the Xbox 360, PlayStation 3, Nintendo DS and Wii. In 2012, Jackbox Games developed and published a social version of the 2011 game on Facebook with cross-platform versions subsequently released for Roku, iOS, and Android. On November 5, 2013, Jackbox reissued the majority of the franchise's many volumes and spinoffs onto Steam.

On November 18, 2014, You Don't Know Jack 2015 was released as part of The Jackbox Party Pack on Windows, macOS, Xbox 360, Xbox One, PlayStation 3, PlayStation 4, and later Nintendo Switch, iPad, Amazon Fire TV, Android TV, Nvidia Shield, Apple TV, and Xfinity X1. On October 17, 2018, You Don't Know Jack: Full Stream was released as part of The Jackbox Party Pack 5 for the same platforms as You Don't Know Jack 2015, with the exception of PlayStation 3 and Xbox 360.

== History ==
In 1991, Jellyvision's former identity, Learn Television, released the award-winning film The Mind's Treasure Chest, which featured lead character Jack Patterson. When Learn Television sought to use new multimedia technologies to create a more active learning experience, the company teamed up with Follett Software Company and developed "That's a Fact, Jack!", a reading motivation CD-ROM game show series covering young adult fiction, targeted to 3rd through 10th graders. The game would give a title for a child to read, and then ask questions related to that title.

The idea for You Don't Know Jack began while That's a Fact, Jack! was still in development. The game's title comes from the more vulgar version of the phrase: "You don't know jack shit".

== Gameplay ==
The game can be played by up to eight players, depending on the version. All versions of the game feature the voice of an off-screen host, who reads questions aloud, provides instructions regarding special question types, and pokes fun at the players. The game usually opens with a green room segment, in which the players are prompted to enter their names and given instructions for play. Each game lasts for a number of questions, commonly 11 in later games.

The category of the questions may be pre-determined, or selected by one of the players. Most questions are multiple choice and must be answered within a time limit. Depending on the game, players answer separately or buzz in to give an answer. Correct answers award money while incorrect answers (or sometimes not answering) deduct money. The money value of each question varies across a game. There are occasionally other question types offered (see below).

Players are also given the opportunity to "screw" other players, which forces them to answer the question or make the question harder to answer. Players choosing to "screw" receive additional money if the "screwed" players answer incorrectly, but may be penalized if otherwise.

=== Question types ===
The majority of You Don't Know Jack questions are multiple choice, with four possible choices. Some questions are fill-in-the-blank, requiring a typed response.

Special questions are also played during the game. Each version of You Don't Know Jack has its own different types of special questions. Some of the most common are the "DisOrDat", in which players must determine which of two categories the given subjects fall under (such as if Jay Leno was a daytime or a nighttime talk show host, if orecchiette is a type of pasta or a parasite) and the "Gibberish Question", involving a nonsensical phrase whose syllables rhyme with a more common phrase or title (for example, "Pre-empt Tires, Like Crack" could be the gibberish to The Empire Strikes Back).

=== Jack Attack ===
The final round of the game, called the Jack Attack in most versions, is a word association question. A word, phrase, or name appears in the middle of the screen, to which the player must find associated words or phrases that fit the overall category. For example, Star Wars might be the associated word, and the correct answer fitting "movie stars" could be Harrison Ford. For each associated subject, several potential matches appear and the players win money by buzzing in when the correct match appears, or by selecting the correct matches.

In all versions of the game, the running total of each player's score is not shown anywhere on the screen during Jack Attack, and this part of the game is usually accompanied by ominous music or ambient sounds. This creates tension between players because of the uncertainty of ranking, and the unsettling atmosphere.

=== Game show theme ===
Throughout the You Don't Know Jack franchise, there has been a running theme of You Don't Know Jack taking place on a self-titled televised game show where the players are the contestants. This idea is shown by satirical fake commercials that can be heard while starting the game, and in most games, after the game has finished.

=== Hosts ===
The following is a list of the hosts throughout the You Don't Know Jack series.

- Nate Shapiro (voiced by Harry Nathan Gottlieb)
- Guy Towers (played by Andy Poland)
- Buzz Lippman (voiced by Peter B. Spector)
- Cookie Masterson (played by Tom Gottlieb)
- Josh "Schmitty" Schmitstinstein (played by Phil Ridarelli)
- Bob (voiced by Andy Poland)
- Jack Cake (voiced by Paul Kaye) – The host of the British version.
- Quizmaster Jack (voiced by Axel Malzacher in Vol. 1 and Kai Taschner in Vol. 2, Vol. 3: 'Abwärts!', & Vol. 4) – The host of the German versions.
- Masatoshi Hamada – The host of the Japanese version.
- Troy Stevens (played by Paul Reubens) – The host of the 2001 You Don't Know Jack TV show.
- Iain Lee (played by himself) - The host of the unaired You Don't Know Jack pilot for Channel 4 in the UK.

== Releases ==
Main series release timeline Main releases in bold
1995	**Vol. 1**
1996	Question Pack
1996	**Vol. 2**
1996	Sports
1996	The Netshow
1997	**Vol. 3**
1997	Movies
1997	Television
1997	Sports: The Netshow
1998	**Vol. 4: The Ride**
1998	HeadRush
1999	Offline
1999	PlayStation
2000	Louder! Faster! Funnier!
2000	**5th Dementia**
2000	Mock 2
2001–2002
2003	**Vol. 6: The Lost Gold**
2004–2010
2011	**2011**
2012	Mobile
2013	Ouya
2014	**2015**
2015–2017
2018	**Full Stream**

This is a list of the You Don't Know Jack games released:

=== PC/Mac ===
==== Main series ====
- You Don't Know Jack – October 23, 1995
  - You Don't Know Jack Question Pack – 1996
- You Don't Know Jack Vol. 2 – November 4, 1996
  - Regional versions released in the UK, Germany, France, and Japan.
  - Released in France and Germany as You Don't Know Jack.
  - Released in Japan as You Don't Know Jack Presented by Masatoshi Hamada.
- You Don't Know Jack Vol. 3 – October 12, 1997
  - Released in Germany as You Don't Know Jack Vol. 2.
- You Don't Know Jack Vol. 4: The Ride – November 16, 1998
  - The first episodic game.
  - The first game with live-action video footage.
  - Released in Germany as You Don't Know Jack Vol. 3: Abwärts!
- You Don't Know Jack Offline – September 8, 1999
  - Includes 800 questions from The Netshow plus 200 new questions.
- You Don't Know Jack Louder! Faster! Funnier! – March 28, 2000
  - The sequel to Offline.
- You Don't Know Jack 5th Dementia – November 1, 2000
  - The first game with online functionality.
- You Don't Know Jack Vol. 6: The Lost Gold – December 1, 2003
  - Released in Germany as You Don't Know Jack Vol. 4, featuring online functionality.
- You Don't Know Jack – February 8, 2011

==== Spin-offs ====
- You Don't Know Jack Sports – October 17, 1996
- You Don't Know Jack: The Netshow – 1996
  - Required an Internet connection.
  - The servers went offline in 2000.
- You Don't Know Jack Movies – April 16, 1997
- You Don't Know Jack Television – October 31, 1997
- You Don't Know Jack Sports: The Netshow – 1997
- You Don't Know Jack HeadRush (a teen spin-off game) – August 31, 1998

=== Console ===
- You Don't Know Jack – September 8, 1999 (PlayStation)
  - Includes questions from Vol. 3, Movies and Offline.
  - Main game based on Vol. 3.
- You Don't Know Jack Mock 2 – November 1, 2000 (PlayStation)
  - Includes questions from Vol. 4, Louder! Faster! Funnier! and 5th Dementia.
- You Don't Know Jack – February 8, 2011 (PlayStation 3, Xbox 360, Nintendo Wii, Nintendo DS)
- You Don't Know Jack for Ouya – June 11, 2013 (Ouya)
  - Based on the 2011 video game.

=== Jackbox Party Packs ===
- You Don't Know Jack 2015 - November 18, 2014
  - Released as part of The Jackbox Party Pack.
  - Includes 15 episodes from the Ouya version.
- You Don't Know Jack: Full Stream - October 17, 2018
  - Released as part of The Jackbox Party Pack 5.

=== Mobile ===
- You Don't Know Jack – April 2011 (iOS)
  - Removed from App Store in 2012.
- You Don't Know Jack – 2012
  - Based on the Facebook version.
  - Release:
    - iOS - December 13, 2012
      - You Don't Know Jack Lite – 2012 (free version)
    - Android - May 21, 2013
  - Shut down on March 1, 2015.
- You Don't Know Jack Party - September 19, 2013 (iOS)
  - Based on the 2011 and Ouya versions, with all content from the latter included.
  - Required the JackPad app on phones and/or tablets to play.
  - The game and the JackPad app were shut down in 2015.

=== Other ===
- You Don't Know Jack (tabletop edition) by Tiger Electronics - 1998
  - Came with 500 general knowledge questions on 125 cards; additional 113-card, 450-question expansion packs with TV, Movies and Sports themed trivia were also released.
- You Don't Know Jack – 2007–2008
  - Online beta game on the You Don't Know Jack website.
- You Don't Know Jack – 2012 (Roku)
- You Don't Know Jack (Facebook) – May 26, 2012
  - Shut down on March 1, 2015.

== Reception ==
The You Don't Know Jack series shipped 500,000 units by December 1996. Shipments in the United States alone rose to nearly 1 million by February 1998. By 2001, the You Don't Know Jack series had totaled sales of 3.5 million copies. YDKJ sold above 4.5 million copies and drew revenues above $100 million by 2008.

Inside Mac Games named You Don't Know Jack Vol. 2 the best puzzle game of 1996. The editors wrote that it "continues the high standards established by Berkeley's breakaway classic". It received a score of 4 out of 5 from MacUser.

You Don't Know Jack Movies was a runner-up for Computer Gaming World's 1997 "Puzzle Game of the Year" award, which ultimately went to Smart Games Challenge 2. The editors called Movies a "hilarious party game", and noted that it "came a close second".

You Don't Know Jack XL won two 1996 Spotlight Awards, for "Best Script, Story or Interactive Writing" and "Best Trivia or Puzzle Game".

You Don't Know Jack Vol. 3 was the finalist for GameSpot's 1997 "Best Puzzles and Classics Game" award, which ultimately went to Chessmaster 5500. The editors wrote, "[I]f it weren't for the addition of the Threeway question format (which is a complete dud), You Don't Know Jack III would have reached instant-classic status."

You Don't Know Jack Vol. 4: The Ride won Computer Gaming World's award for the best classic game of 1998. The editors wrote, "You Don't Know Jack Vol. 4: The Ride ranks easily as the best since the first of the series found its way into the CGW Hall of Fame. And for that we salute the folks at Berkeley Systems and Jellyvision, game designers who really do know Jack, at least where our funny bones are concerned." It also won the 1998 Spotlight Award for "Best Trivia, Puzzle or Classic Game" from the Game Developers Conference.

You Don't Know Jack: Huge received a score of 4.5 out of 5 from Michael Gowan of Macworld, who wrote that the game "will strain your brain while amusing you with its witty banter and rapid-fire action." In 1998, The Huge collection was named the 48th-best computer game of all time by PC Gamer US, whose editors called it "essential stuff."

== Other media ==
You Don't Know Jack appeared as two books: You Don't Know Jack: The Book and You Don't Know Jack: The TV Book. Both were published in 1998 by Running Press.

There was also a Tiger Electronic tabletop game of You Don't Know Jack, emceed by Nate Shapiro. It featured question cards with a number code on them and a grey button to open a sliding door to show the answers. It was the first game to feature 4 players instead of 3 players. There were also "Sports", "Movies", and "TV" question packs that were sold separately. A standalone handheld version was also released.

An actual television show version of You Don't Know Jack had a brief run on ABC in prime time during the summer of 2001. It starred Paul Reubens (the actor and comedian best known for his character Pee-wee Herman) as over-the-top game show host Troy Stevens, with Tom Gottlieb's 'Cookie' as the announcer. A previous attempt had been made by Telepictures Productions and Warner Bros. Television in 1996, produced by Ron Greenberg in Chicago; this version, intended as a weekday syndicated show, was not picked up (after initial tests and run-throughs necessitated a retooling of the show; Telepictures subsequently chose to drop the project).

After the You Don't Know Jack TV show ended, another show from the makers of You Don't Know Jack called Smush aired on USA Network in late 2001. It was a game of taking two or more words and combining them into one long word. The show started late at night, but was later pushed to later and later times, even up to 3:00 A.M.; until it was eventually canceled.

In 2001, UK based broadcaster Channel 4 were pitched by Princess Productions, a previously unseen pilot episode of the show with Iain Lee as host. The show was never picked up, but was uploaded by Lee himself in September 2025 to his YouTube channel. Lee's comments in the video often explain that at the time of pitching, he thought the show was "Onto a winner".

In 2001, AMC released You Don't Know Jack about MonsterFest, an online game on their website emceed by Schmitty, and the MonsterFest movie marathon was hosted by Clive Barker and Carmen Electra, who gave clues for the game.
