= Party video game =

Genre of video games

A party video game is a genre of video game that stems from in-person party games, involving player-to-player interaction as the central gameplay element. These games are often defined by simple controls which can be easily picked up and understood by players of any skill level.

Party video games generally consist of short-term experiences which may be played in succession, and are sometimes characterized in the form of minigames. These experiences may be played singularly or in a group, and usually feature several players competing simultaneously.

== History ==
The first party video game is thought to be Olympic Decathlon, releasing in 1980.

In 1983, Party Mix, an anthology of five multiplayer games, was released for the Atari, which began the format of party video games releasing as a series of individually-selectable minigames.

In 1995, You Don't Know Jack was released, the first of the You Don't Know Jack franchise and the precursor to the Jackbox Party Pack collection in 2014.

In 1998, Mario Party was released on the Nintendo 64. Its success led to the rest of the Mario Party franchise. Mario Party 2 was released in 1999, and Mario Party 3 was released in 2000.

The launch of the Wii in 2006 led to the creation of Wii Play, a minigame collection that was bundled with certain copies of the Wii console. Years later, in the summer of 2010, Nintendo released Wii Party, which received a 7/10 on IGN, citing it as "a pretty good game to bring out during family game nights or videogame friendly cocktail parties."

The introduction of the Nintendo Switch in 2017 changed party gaming to a hybrid portable and home-used party game. The Joy-Con controllers could be detached and used to play with two-players without additional accessories, which promoted spontaneous multiplayer gaming. Additional controllers can be paired to the console for a total of four-players can play. Super Mario Party (2018) was a continuation of the board-and-minigame format of its predecessors, and Mario Party Superstars (2021) revived the nostalgia of the Nintendo 64 and GameCube on the new platform. The Switch was also used as a standard multiplayer game like Mario Kart 8 Deluxe (2017), which was still popular among players to have group racing sessions.

Remote and online party games increased in popularity in the late 2010s and the early 2020s. The Jackbox Party Pack series also proposed a smartphone controller system, which enabled more players to join without using the traditional controllers. The social deduction game Among Us was popularly used to conduct online gatherings during the COVID-19 pandemic due to its easy rules and group discussion format. Online streaming platforms like Twitch and YouTube made party games more visible, making the gameplay an activity that could be enjoyed by online viewers as collective entertainment.

== Gameplay and design ==
Party games are designed for quick plays, with simple rules along with easy to follow gameplay. Through the use of clear visual cues, prompt instructions, and quick rounds, players new to video games can start playing within seconds. Developers typically design these games around amusement, group interaction, and light competition, where winning matters less than having fun together. Many modern titles are designed with accessibility in mind. For example, Jackbox Games, which uses phones as controllers, removing the need for extra accessories or experience. The developers refer to this approach as "inclusivity through design".

== Social and cultural impact ==
Party video games allow users to connect and interact by completing various challenges together. Researchers found that these games helped maintain friendships, reduce boredom, and increase group get-togethers. During COVID-19, many people turned to online party games, such as Jackbox Party Packs, Among Us, and Gang Beasts to stay in touch.

Schools and employers have used them to encourage teamwork and communication, showing playful interactions can lead to collaboration. The humor and visual design in these games typically reflects broader social values, such as how players interact, compete, and joke with each other.

== Popular culture ==
Party video games have become a part of popular culture in gaming and media. Their characters, sound effects, and funny moments that are often shared through memes, clips, or on social platforms (e.g. Twitch; YouTube). Many are featured on streaming platforms like Twitch, YouTube, or TikTok, where gameplay has turned into a form of shared entertainment. Viewer can watch and comment on live sessions of streamers playing games such as Jackbox or Among Us, turning it into a type of social performance.

== Education ==
Games (such as Kahoot, Minecraft, Jackbox Party, or Keep Talking and Nobody Explodes) are sometimes used in classrooms as a way of improving teamwork, creativity, and communication. They help with social learning because players need to listen, cooperate, and adapt with each other to whatever happens. The genre provides an opportunity to allow individuals to bridge the cultural and social barriers. It turns a simple activity into an interactive experience shared with others rather than something done alone.

== See also ==
- List of party video games
