= Jellyvision =

American software company

The Jellyvision Lab, Inc.
- Type: Private
- Industry: Software industry, Video game
- Founded: 1989; 37 years ago
- Founder: Harry Nathan Gottlieb
- Headquarters: Chicago, Illinois, US
- Key people: Amanda Lannert (CEO)
- Website: jellyvision.com

The Jellyvision Lab, Inc. is an American software company based in Chicago, Illinois. Founded in 1989, and as a video game development company by Harry Nathan Gottlieb in 1995, Jellyvision has since transitioned to creating benefits guidance software.

== History ==
Jellyvision was originally founded in 1989 as an educational media company, later pivoting to develop video games. Founder Harry Nathan Gottlieb created the CD-ROM game You Don't Know Jack in 1995. It became a massive success and established a franchise of You Don't Know Jack titles from 1995 to 1998. Facing a major shift in the computer game market, as players moved from personal computers to home consoles, Jellyvision shuttered in 2001.

Later that year, Gottlieb launched a new company called the Jellyvision Lab, with a focus on developing business software inspired by You Don’t Know Jack's voice-driven interface. In 2009, Jellyvision developed the first version of ALEX, an interactive conversation that helps employees choose their benefits. The success of ALEX spurred Jellyvision's growth, and as of 2019 is the company's primary business focus, expanding to offer an interactive HSA product and year-round financial guidance.

In 2008, the original Jellyvision Games was relaunched as a subsidiary of the Jellyvision Lab. It spun off into its own company in 2011, and rebranded as Jackbox Games in 2013.

In 2017, Jellyvision acquired the healthcare platform FlexMinder.
