= Guitar Vader =

Japanese underground indie rock band

- Origin: Tokyo, Japan
- Genres: Alternative rock; rock; indie rock
- Years active: 1998–2007
- Labels: Berry, Plugs House
- Past members: Ujuan Shozo; Miki Tanabe; Yuki Takumiya; Suzuki Yoshifumi; Steve Laity

Guitar Vader (Note: Japanese: ギターベイダー) was a Japanese underground indie rock band. Formed in 1998, the band is best known for their contributions to the soundtracks of Sega's Jet Set Radio and Jet Set Radio Future games. The band disbanded in 2007.

Guitar Vader had two lead vocalists and songwriters, guitarist Miki Tanabe and bassist Ujuan Shozo. Tanabe's childlike voice and Shozo's tenor are often used in harmony and call and response, but many songs are sung exclusively by one or the other. Their music generally features pop-oriented melodies, often coupled with aggressive power chords and hard rock influences, and sometimes playfully shifts between genres in mid-song. Band members claimed influences like Nirvana, The Beatles, The Pixies and the Ramones, as well as lesser influences like Air and Guitar Wolf. Others have likened their sound to bands as disparate as The B-52's and Smashing Pumpkins.

== History ==
Tanabe and Shozo first met in Kawasaki, Kanagawa while the two were in different bands. The two became friends, and after their other bands broke up, they decided to collaborate. Yuki Takumiya joined them as the band's drummer. The trio began recording at Berry Records soon after, and in October 1998, they released their first cassette tape, a collection of four songs titled Guitar Vader Vol. 1. More than 1,000 copies were sold at an independent record store in Tokyo called High-Line. The tape was followed by another release, which sold another 1000 units. Empowered by their success, the two volumes were compiled along with new material and one remix onto the two tape set, Die Happy!. The album gained distribution in Tower Records and HMV stores, but was never released officially on CD. This gave the band, who only performed live shows irregularly, their first real exposure to a larger audience. Later that year, they released one more tape, containing three new songs, including the exclusive rarity "Generation Revolution".

Following Die Happy!, Guitar Vader was asked to contribute original music to the Dreamcast game Roommania #203, a life sim following a virtual college student. Guitar Vader contributed ten songs to the game's extensive soundtrack. The successful release of the game suddenly skyrocketed Guitar Vader's profile and the need for a proper CD release became increasingly apparent.

It was around this time that the band departed from the lo-fi recording sensibilities of their earlier work with their second album Wild at Honey (a reference to the Beach Boys album Wild Honey) containing two songs from Guitar Vader Vol. 3 and new material. Shortly thereafter, the band released a single, Beach Panic, containing two songs. Following its completion, drummer Takumiya left the band.

Video game composer Hideki Naganuma was among the many who discovered Guitar Vader through the Die Happy! tapes. A lover of underground music, Naganuma decided that they would be a perfect fit for the upcoming game Jet Set Radio, set in an alternate-reality version of Shinjuku, Tokyo. The game was widely praised for its soundtrack, which prominently featured Guitar Vader's song "Magical Girl" in the opening tutorial, and "Super Brothers" (another Die Happy! track) in a later stage.

In 2000, Guitar Vader began work on their third album, From Dusk. Joined by Suzuki Yoshifumi on drums, the album marked a major evolution for the band, particularly for its prominent use of keyboards, played by producer Taichi Ohira, as well as its more polished, melodic sound. The album was released in early 2001, and although it was not a big seller, the album remains Guitar Vader's commercial peak. Jet Set Radio Future was released in 2002, and featured a song from the album, "Baby-T" as well as a remix (by Naganuma) of "I Love Love You," which had previously been released on the remix album Remixes GVR.

After the acquisition of Berry Records by Sony Music, Guitar Vader became increasingly unhappy with their contract, in particular their lack of ownership of their music, low royalties, and inability to get a new album released. At the time, both members of the band still worked part-time jobs to earn their living. The band left Berry in 2003 and formed an independent label, Plugs House. They built their own studio and produced a fourth album, Dawn. The release marked a continued evolution of the band's sound, with synths and programming performed by Shozo. In 2003, the band also played two shows in England, hosted by Pixelsurgeon, their only shows outside Japan.

To replicate these songs in live performances, the band recruited American keyboardist Steve Laity. Although Laity was made an official member of the band, he only appeared in live performances, not on the band's albums. In October 2004, Guitar Vader released what would be their final album, Happy East. It continued the expanded sound of Dawn with an eclectic mix of songs, including an electronica instrumental "Suspense" that marked the only song of its kind in the band's catalog.

In 2006, the band began work on another album, and had nearly completed it, when Shozo suffered a vital heart infection that left him hospitalized for months, with continuing health issues long after. The band cancelled their first scheduled concert in the United States at that year's FanimeCon. Although the album was either completed or close to completed, a falling out between Tanabe and Shozo prevented its release, despite pressure from Yoshifumi and Laity to release it. In 2007, Laity confirmed on Guitar Vader's message board that the band had disbanded and a "very large rift" had formed between the band's two key members. No official announcement was ever made.

== Band members ==
=== Former members ===
- Ujuan Shozo - vocals, bass, programming
- Miki Tanabe - vocals, guitar
- Suzuki Yoshifumi - drums (2000-2007)
- Yuki Takumiya - drums (1998-2000)

=== Touring members ===
- Steve Laity - keyboards, backing vocals (2004-2007)

== Discography ==
=== EPs ===
- Guitar Vader Vol. 1 (1998)
- Guitar Vader Vol. 2 (1998)
- Guitar Vader Vol. 3 (1999)

=== Studio albums ===
- Die Happy! (1999)
- Wild at Honey (2000)
- From Dusk (2001)
- Dawn (2003)
- Happy East (2004)

=== Singles ===
- Beach Panic! (2000)
- Baby-T/GVTV/Shimanagashi (2001)

=== Remixes ===
- REMIXES_GVR (2001)

=== Other credits ===
- Makoto Kawamoto, "Gimmeshelter" (2001; production, instrumentation and backing vocals)
