= Ollie King =

2004 video game

- Arcade flyer
- Developer: Amusement Vision
- Publisher: Sega
- Director: Masayoshi Yokoyama
- Producer: Masayoshi Kikuchi
- Designers: Nobuhiro Suzuki; Kazuki Hosokawa; Satoshi Kawase
- Programmer: Fumiaki Hara
- Artist: Tsuyoshi Tsunoi
- Composer: Hideki Naganuma
- Platform: Arcade
- Release: March 2004
- Genres: Racing, platform
- Modes: Single-player, multiplayer
- Arcade system: Sega Chihiro

Ollie King (Note: Japanese: オーリーキング, Hepburn: Ōrī Kingu) is an arcade skateboard racing game developed by Amusement Vision and published by Sega for the Xbox based Sega Chihiro hardware in March 2004 making it the only Amusement Vision game not to run on Sega or Nintendo based hardware. following limited location tests in late 2003. The game was revealed at Tokyo's JAMMA Arcade Show in 2003. A spiritual successor to Top Skater, it was created by the same team that developed Jet Set Radio. Despite running on the Xbox based Chihiro, it was never ported to the console itself.

== Plot ==
A downhill racing skate tournament competition, named the Ollie King, makes its debut. The tournament takes place in Hyde and Lombard, Piccadilly Circus, and Fushimi Castle and Fushimi Inari-taisha. Six of these challengers: Phillip "Grinner" Jones, Tez Tanaka, Miguel Diaz, Didi Summers, Scott Ripper, and JB Bullet, may have what it takes to be crowned boarding's best as Ollie King.

== Gameplay ==
Ollie King is played on a cabinet with an attached skateboard-like setup made to mimic the experience of riding a skateboard. Through planting one's weight of their back foot on the board, the board can sink in, mimicking the action of a skateboarder squatting to ready their core to control their board before performing tricks or going down hill. Upon shifting one's weight to the front, this mimics the standard skateboard trick known as an ollie, allowing one to perform skateboard tricks in game or jump. Tilting the board left or right steers the player's character. Up to four players can play.

One of six characters are picked, each with their own stats, competing in a series of downhill skateboarding, races with the goal of getting first place, where eight contestants compete in three locations (San Francisco, London, and Kyoto), each with a difficulty rating from one to five stars. The cabinet had difficulty modes which altered tracks slightly: Kids Mode, Normal Mode, and Expert Mode.

Race tracks are designed akin to another Sega skateboarding game, Top Skater. A "checkpoint heat" system is present: clear a portion of the stage in a given time, or else be immediately disqualified. In a solo arcade run, the player character will have to deal with skater gangs, with first place needed to be allowed to the next stage of Ollie King. Due to Ollie King being a coin operated arcade game, winning or losing, at the discretion of the arcade operator's settings, demands payment to continue to the next stage.

If the player is not careful, they can "wipe out"; wipe outs are triggered by falling beyond a safe drop distance after a regular jump, crashing into pillars or walls at high speeds, and being unbalanced during a rail grind. While the game doesn't have a health mechanic, it is similar to being out of bounds for an extended period of time or falling off the course in other competitive/kart racing games, which can stall the player and have them lose their place in the race to other racers, and issues penalties to the player's rank upon completing the race.

During the race contestants can perform tricks to gain points and are ranked with a letter system from lowest to highest: D, C, B, A, S, SS, and X. Rankings of tricks are highly dependent on conditions of performance, what kind of tricks are being done, and the player's reaction speed and timing. Due to limits on how many track elements there are in a given stage, S to X aerial tricks are only performed with big ramps and large air space, instead encouraging the frequent performance of many high level tricks as they can with what they can come across as soon as possible. Upon scoring any position in a race the players receive a final score with two letter grades and a ranking, the lowest being "Raw Beginner" and the highest being "Ollie King".
