= Eric Haze =

American artist (born 1961)

- Born: 1961 (age 63–64); New York, New York, U.S.
- Style: Graffiti
- Spouse: Rosie Perez (m. 2013)
- Website: www.erichazenyc.com

Eric Haze (born 1961) is an American artist, graphic designer and art director.

== Career ==
Eric Haze was born in 1961 in New York City to progressive parents of the Upper West Side. Haze was drawn to art through his father's friend's pop art collection and meeting Elaine de Kooning who gave Haze oil paints while she painted a portrait of Haze and his sister in 1971.

In 1972, Haze began writing graffiti throughout New York City. In 1974, he started showing his art publicly, later exhibiting paintings and drawings alongside friends Keith Haring and Jean-Michel Basquiat in the 1980s. As part of the seminal New York City collective “The Soul Artists”, Haze was one of the original pioneers to bring graffiti above ground into the mainstream and the first graffiti artist to brand his tag as a logo, creating one of the first street wear clothing companies to rise out of the hip hop era. Haze also appeared in the seminal 1983 documentary Style Wars.

In 1985, Haze graduated with honors from School of Visual Arts in NYC with a degree in graphic design. In 1986, he set up a design studio and due to his unique positioning of coming out of the hip-hop era, began establishing clientele and relationships within that market and community. He has created logos, album covers and identity design for clients including the Beastie Boys, Tommy Boy Records, LL Cool J and EPMD.

In 1991, Haze relocated his design studio to Los Angeles, where he also founded his eponymous clothing and accessory brand, HAZE. By 2005, the brand had three stores in Tokyo.

In 2000, Haze contributed to the creation of the video game Jet Set Radio, published by Sega, providing some graffiti of his own to be used in the game. The follow up, Jet Set Radio Future, would also feature art from him as well.

In 2005, Haze returned to New York City, setting up a new studio in Williamsburg, Brooklyn. Haze has since presented solo exhibitions in New York, Los Angeles, Hong Kong, Paris and Tokyo. Haze was also featured in the 2011 landmark exhibition “Art in the Streets” at Museum of Contemporary Art Los Angeles.

== Personal life ==
Haze runs his studio out of Brooklyn, New York, where he lives with his wife, actress Rosie Perez.
