= Hideki Naganuma =

Japanese composer and DJ (born 1972)

- 長沼 英樹
- Born: May 16, 1972 (age 54); Otaru, Hokkaidō, Japan
- Other name: Skankfunk
- Occupations: Composer; DJ
- Years active: 1993–present
- Employer: Sega (1998–2008)
- Musical career
- Genres: Electronic; trip hop; hip hop; funk; dance; breakbeat; big beat; electronic rock; video game music
- Instruments: Keyboards; synthesizers; turntables

Hideki Naganuma (Note: Japanese: 長沼 英樹, Hepburn: Naganuma Hideki) (born May 16, 1972) is a Japanese composer and DJ who primarily does work for video games. Naganuma is best known for his soundtrack for the game Jet Set Radio and its sequel Jet Set Radio Future.

== Early life ==
Naganuma started his musical career by playing the electronic organ, aged five, under the influence of his older sister. When he was fourteen, he became interested in western music and composed his own songs. He then decided to have a job in the music business. During 1993 to 1997, he worked as both a DJ and bartender. He was also aiming to become a singer-songwriter in the J-pop industry, although he dropped this plan.

== Career ==
=== 1998–2008: Work with Sega ===
Naganuma sent demo tapes to Sega in 1998. His application was accepted, with voice editing for Shoujo Kakumei Utena: Itsuka Kakumei Sareru Monogatari and composition for Hip Jog Jog being among his first works with the company, the latter of which he worked with senior composer Kenichi Tokoi.

In 2000, he served as the lead composer for Jet Set Radio, serving as his breakthrough work. He took inspiration from big beat music for the game. He would go on to compose for its sequel Jet Set Radio Future in 2002, along with Ollie King in 2003, also developed by Smilebit. In 2005, he composed a large portion of Sonic Rush's soundtrack, for which he was later nominated at the Golden Joystick Awards for Soundtrack of the Year. The following year, he was responsible for music supervision and composing two tracks for the anime adaption of Air Gear, itself being influenced by Jet Set Radio. For contractual reasons, he used the "skankfunk" alias as he was still employed at Sega at the time, while Air Gear had nothing to do with Sega. He also created a remix of "Fuusen Gum" for the anime Gintama, but similarly was not credited at the time.

During his later years with Sega, Naganuma was part of Yakuza's team, where his role was mostly limited to voice editing and producing sound effects. The boss of its team did not allow him to work on the soundtrack of Sonic Rush Adventure. Following his work on Ryū ga Gotoku Kenzan! in 2008, he left Sega to become a freelance composer. He has continued to work on Sega games under his "skankfunk" alias, including Kurohyō: Ryū ga Gotoku Shinshō and Super Monkey Ball 3D.

=== 2008–present: Freelance work ===
During the earlier years following his departure from Sega, Naganuma contributed a handful of tracks to various Sega games such as Kurohyō: Ryū ga Gotoku Shinshō and Super Monkey Ball 3D, under the skankfunk alias. In 2012, he contributed the track "Luv Can Save U" for the 20th installment of Konami's arcade rhythm game Beatmania IIDX, and for the 21st installment an extended mix of the aforementioned track. In 2014, Naganuma contributed to the charity CD Game Music Prayer II for relief of the 2011 Great East Japan Earthquake with an original track titled "Aria di Maria".

By the late 2010s, he became popular on the social network platform Twitter, where he frequently interacts with fans and posts internet memes and shitposts related to Jet Set Radio and other media, such as Family Guy, Among Us, Juuni Senshi Bakuretsu Eto Ranger, and Big Chungus.

As a result of his online popularity and musical success, he has contributed tracks to a number of indie games inspired by Jet Set Radio. In 2017, Naganuma contributed two new original songs for the game Hover. In 2018, Naganuma released the track "Ain't Nothin' Like a Funky Beat" as a part of the Lethal League Blaze soundtrack, which featured other notable composers such as Frank Klepacki, Pixelord, Bignic, and Klaus Veen. He was set to compose for Streets of Rage 4, but due to schedule complications and copyright ownership issues, he withdrew from the project in 2020.

Naganuma admitted that since leaving Sega, he has made attempts to work for Nintendo, after the topic was brought up by fans of the Splatoon franchise that he should have worked on the latest games' soundtrack, who drew parallels between it and his previous works. He composed for indie game Bomb Rush Cyberfunk, which was released on August 18, 2023. He has also expressed a desire to create an original album and clarified he is not active in the gaming industry.

== Musical style ==
Naganuma's early sound is often labelled as an energetic, rhythm-heavy blend of hip hop, electronic, dance, funk, jazz, and rock. His music was produced to match the visual style of the games he was working on as closely as possible, and experimented with voices, cutting and rearranging samples to the point that they become nonsensical. Since the release of Jet Set Radio, Naganuma's sound has incorporated many elements of breakbeat, and EDM.

== Works ==
=== Video games ===
| Year | Title | Notes |
|---|---|---|
| 1998 | Shoujo Kakumei Utena: Itsuka Kakumei Sareru Monogatari | Voice editing |
| 1998 | Hip Jog Jog | Music with Kenichi Tokoi; & sound effects |
| 1999 | Sega Rally 2 | Dreamcast version; music with Tomonori Sawada |
| 1999 | Atsumare! Guru Guru Onsen | Music with various others |
| 2000 | JRA PAT for Dreamcast | Music ("Ebb & Flow") |
| 2000 | Jet Set Radio | Music with various others; & sound effects, music editing |
| 2000 | Daytona USA 2001 | Sound effects |
| 2001 | Super Galdelic Hour | Voice editing |
| 2001 | World Advanced Daisenryaku | Music editing |
| 2002 | Jet Set Radio Future | Music with various others |
| 2003 | J. League Pro Soccer Club o Tsukurou! 3 | Music ("Get It 2 Win It") |
| 2004 | Ollie King | Music |
| 2005 | Sonic Rush | Music with Teruhiko Nakagawa, Masayoshi Ishi and Hiroyuki Hamada |
| 2005 | Yakuza | Voice editing |
| 2006 | Sega Rally 2006 | Music ("Boosted") |
| 2006 | Super Monkey Ball: Banana Blitz | Music ("Southpole (Winter Banana Pretz Mix)") |
| 2006 | Yakuza 2 | Voice editing |
| 2008 | Ryu ga Gotoku Kenzan! | Cutscene music, sound effects |
| 2010 | Kurohyō: Ryū ga Gotoku Shinshō | Music with various others |
| 2011 | Super Monkey Ball 3D | Music with various others |
| 2012 | Kurohyō 2: Ryū ga Gotoku Ashura Hen | Music with various others |
| 2012 | Beatmania IIDX 20: Tricoro | Music ("Luv Can Save U") |
| 2012 | Yakuza 5 | Music ("Vendor Pop") |
| 2013 | Dead Heat Riders | Music |
| 2016 | War of Brains | Music ("Feel the Power in Your Soul") |
| 2017 | Hover | Music ("Heaven Up" and "Never 4ever") |
| 2018 | Persona 3: Dancing in Moonlight | Arrangement ("When the Moon's Reaching Out Stars") |
| 2018 | Lethal League Blaze | Music ("Ain't Nothing Like a Funky Beat") |
| 2020 | Warp Drive | Music ("Pumpin' Jumpin'") |
| 2023 | Bomb Rush Cyberfunk | Music with various others |

=== Other ===
| Year | Title | Notes |
|---|---|---|
| 2001 | Guitar Vader - REMIXES_GVR | "I Love Love You [Love Love Super Dimension Mix]" |
| 2006 | Gintama | "Fuusen Gum (Gintama Mix)" |
| 2006 | Air Gear | "Love Sensation" and "Sky-2-High"; music supervision |
