= Makoto Kawamoto =

Makoto Kawamoto 川本 真琴
- Born: 川本 和代 (Kawamoto Kazuyo); January 19, 1974 (age 52); Fukui, Japan
- Genres: Japanese pop, Funk; Rock
- Occupation: Singer-songwriter
- Instruments: Vocals piano electronic keyboards acoustic guitars electric guitars flutes
- Years active: 1996–present
- Labels: Sony Records (1996–1998); Sony Music Associated Records (1999–2001); Antinos Records (2001–2002); Hamajim Records (2006–present)
- Website: kawamotomakoto.com

Makoto Kawamoto (川本真琴, Kawamoto Makoto; born January 19, 1974), is a Japanese pop singer, songwriter and multi-instrumentalist from Fukui, Japan. She currently sings under the pseudonym Tiger Fake Fur.

== Biography ==
=== Early life ===
Kawamoto grew up hearing her mother playing the piano. Aside from learning piano, she also studied ballet for about two years and joined the boys' and girls' chorus and took flute lessons. Her life was changed upon seeing a rock festival held in the nearby Prefectural Hall in her high school days. Kawamoto entered the Jin-ai Women's College music department, piano department and formed a band. After graduating from college, Kawamoto found a job at a company and became a piano teacher. However, since she only received a salary of 40,000 yen, she got fed up with her job and quit. Still, she continued to teach piano in her parents' house. She earned her livelihood working at a wedding hall, during which time she continued to try forming a band.

Kawamoto participated in "AIDS against FUKUI" held in Fukui as a band. She wrote the song and made all the members in the hall sing on the pretext of being elected to the executive committee. Because of that, she was invited to Sony's "Showcase" where amateurs perform live in audition style. Since she was pleased with Tokyo, she saved 1 million yen within half a year, and went to Tokyo at the age of 21. She had a feeling that they liked her performance, but her position was still ambiguous for a while. She worked hard at composition while working part-time in a strange city. Although poor, she lived happily.

=== Major label days ===
Because Kawamoto often went to the head office of Sony Music Entertainment Japan, she got to know the staff of the management office, and she signed a contract with them at the age of 22.

It was decided that Kawamoto would release a CD from the second production department of Sony. She practised acoustic guitar hard to reproduce the sound of the demo tape of her debut single "Ai no Sainō" which Yasuyuki Okamura produced. She was given the stage name of "Makoto Kawamoto" and made her debut as a singer. She lost weight as the result of pressure from appearing on TV programs or radio programs, and from pressure of composing music.

Kawamoto released her 2nd single "DNA", for which she wrote words and music herself, and her 3rd single "1/2" which were tied to popular anime Rurouni Kenshin, and her first album Kawamoto Makoto. However, she encountered problems when she found it difficult to write songs after that, and she occasionally confined herself in a hotel. She did not agree with the record label's plan for her activities, due to pressure, she got out of shape and went home temporarily. Although she thought she might retire as a musician, she was retained by Sony for two more years, and she returned to Tokyo. However, she came to devote herself to live performances without releasing a new song after she released the single "Blossom" in 2001. She came to find pleasure in her work and began to think that she might continue it for a while. However, after talking it over, she decided not to renew the contract with Sony. In October 2002, she left. In April 2003, her contract with Antinos Records expired and she became a freelancer.

=== Independent music ===
In 2005, Kawamoto sang the commercial song of Kanebo "ALLIE", which was Maria Anzai's cover song "Namida no Taiyō (涙の太陽, Sun of tears)." However, it is not released at present.

In 2005, Kawamoto formed "MihoMihoMakoto" with Miho Asahi and Miho Moribayashi, and they performed in the concerts.

On January 25, 2006, Kawamoto announced that she finished music activity with "Makoto Kawamoto" name in her homepage.

On April 24, 2006, Kawamoto announced that she changed her name to "Tiger Fake Fur" with her blog. When she appeared on the live by request of her acquaintance before, it was difficult for her to use the name of "Makoto Kawamoto." Under such a circumstance, she could not but use the alias. She introduced herself as "Tiger Carpet" at first, but she said that she felt sorry for a dead tiger, and renamed it to "Tiger Fake Fur."

On July 5, 2006, Kawamoto released a CD as time-limited group of 3 chorus unit "MihoMihoMakoto" after an interval of five years, and she resumed musical activities completely.

On August 9, 2006, Kawamoto released new 1st single "Yagi-ō no Theme" in the "Tiger Fake Fur" name from HMJM(hamajim) Records.

Recently Kawamoto gives a concert in Tokyo and her hometown, Fukui wherever her feet led her, and she enjoys it.

In 2009, Kawamoto sang "Hontou no Hanashi" in documentary film "An'nyon Yumika".

It is announced that Kawamoto will release her 3rd solo album "Ongaku no Sekai e Youkoso (音楽の世界へようこそ, Welcome to the musical world)" which she produces for herself on February 19, 2010.

== Topics ==
In the 1990s, she often went to various Southeast Asian countries, especially to Philippines, and made her music videos there. According to her, she traveled to Southeast Asia especially Philippines many times during the 1990s, to absorb "fashionable atmospheres". For this reason, her music videos often contain those landscapes and people.

== Discography ==
=== Singles ===
==== Ai no Sainō ====
Ai no Sainou (愛の才能, Sense of Love) is Makoto Kawamoto's 1st single released on May 2, 1996. The English title is "sense of love."

No.	Title	Lyrics	Music	arrangement	Length
1.	"Ai no Sainou (愛の才能, Sense of Love)"	Makoto Kawamoto	Yasuyuki Okamura	Yasuyuki Okamura	5:17
2.	"Sōtai (早退, leaving school early)"	Makoto Kawamoto	Makoto Kawamoto	Tetsuo Ishikawa	5:35
3.	"Ai no Sainō" (Backing track)				5:17
Total length:					16:09

==== DNA ====
DNA is Makoto Kawamoto's 2nd single released on September 2, 1996.

All tracks are written by Makoto Kawamoto, arranged by Tetsuo Ishikawa.

No.	Title	Length
1.	"DNA"	5:47
2.	"LOVE&LUNA"	4:21
3.	"DNA" (Backing track)	5:47
Total length:		15:55

==== 1/2 ====
1/2 (Nibun no Ichi) (One half) is Makoto Kawamoto's 3rd single released on March 21, 1997.

All tracks are written by Makoto Kawamoto, arranged by Tetsuo Ishikawa.

No.	Title	Length
1.	"1/2"	5:15
2.	"1"	5:03
3.	"1/2" (karaoke)
Total length:		15:33

==== Sakura ====
Sakura (桜, A cherry blossom) is Makoto Kawamoto's 4th single released on April 1, 1998.

All tracks are written by Makoto Kawamoto, arranged by Tetsuo Ishikawa.

No.	Title	Length
1.	"Sakura (桜, A cherry blossom)"	5:05
2.	"Doughnut no Ring (ドーナッツのリング, Ring of the donut)"	5:59
3.	"Sakura" (original karaoke)	5:05
Total length:		16:12

==== Pika Pika ====
Pikapika (ピカピカ, glitter) is Makoto Kawamoto's 5th single released on April 1, 1999.

All tracks are written by Makoto Kawamoto, arranged by Tetsuo Ishikawa.

No.	Title	Length
1.	"Pika Pika (ピカピカ, glitter)"
3.	"Pika Pika" (Backing track)

==== Binetsu ====
Binetsu (微熱, A slight fever) is Makoto Kawamoto's 6th single released on January 21, 2000.

All tracks are written by Makoto Kawamoto, arranged by Tetsuo Ishikawa and Tetsuhiro Miyajima.

No.	Title	Length
1.	"Binetsu (微熱, A slight fever)"	5:21
2.	"Binetsu (微熱, A slight fever)" (voice: MANNA)	6:14
Total length:		11:35

==== Fragile ====
Fragile is Makoto Kawamoto's 7th single released on April 26, 2000.

All lyrics are written by Kawamoto "L.A." Makoto.

No.	Title	Music	arrangement	Length
1.	"Fragile"	Eitaro Isono	Eitaro Isono, David Campbell (String section arrangement), Makoto Kawamoto (Choir arrangement)	10:53
2.	"Trouble Bus"	Makoto Kawamoto	Tetsuo Ishikawa (sound produce)	4:23
Total length:				15:17

==== Gimmeshelter ====
Gimmeshelter is Makoto Kawamoto's 8th single released on March 3, 2001.

No.	Title	Lyrics	Music	sound produce	Length
1.	"Gimmeshelter"	Makoto Kawamoto	Makoto Kawamoto	Hyoe Yasuhara, Guitar Vader, Makoto Kawamoto	3:19
2.	"Re-Fragile" (Remixed by Stan Katayama)	Makoto Kawamoto	Eitaro Isono
3.	"Gimmeshelter" (Remixed by EY∃)

==== Blossom ====
Blossom is Makoto Kawamoto's 9th single released on September 30, 2001.

All tracks are written by Makoto Kawamoto, unless otherwise noted.

No.	Title	Lyrics	Length
1.	"Blossom"	Tavito Nanao	6:05
2.	"Alphabet Weeks"		4:55
3.	"Octopaus Theater" (Stan's Lonely Hearts Hammock version)		3:49
Total length:			14:49

==== Yagi-ō no Theme ====
Yagi-ō no Theme (山羊王のテーマ, goat king's theme) is Makoto Kawamoto's 10th single released on August 9, 2006, and is also the 1st single under Tiger Fake Fur name. This song was written for the musical "Obake no Mori (お化けの森, haunted woods)" which Kawamoto wrote herself and she also played a role in.

All tracks are written by Tiger Fake Fur, unless otherwise noted.

No.	Title	Lyrics	Length
1.	"Yagi-ō no Theme (山羊王のテーマ)"		18:45
2.	"Yasagure Yyā-san no Theme "Dolphin Blues" (やさぐれヤーさんのテーマ "ドルフィンブル〜ス")"
3.	"Seijōgakuen-Mae no Uta (成城学園前の歌) –live-"	Yoshida Sensha
4.	"Yagi-ō no Theme" (karaoke with chorus)

==== Fairy Tunes ====
Fairy Tunes (フェアリー・チューンズ) is Makoto Kawamoto's 11th single released on June 22, 2011, under the name of "Makoto Kawamoto feat. Tiger Fake Fur".

No.	Title	Writer(s)	Length
1.	"Tune"	Makoto Kawamoto
2.	"Bye-bye, Curry-rice (バイバイカレーライス, Bye-bye, curry and rice)"	Tokugawa Roman
3.	"Dancer Louise (踊り子ルイーズ)" (cover version)	Kyozo Nishioka
4.	"Ikinuki shiyōyo (息抜きしようよ, Let's break)"	Makoto Kawamoto
Total length:			17:50

=== Albums ===
==== Kawamoto Makoto ====
Kawamoto Makoto is Makoto Kawamoto's 1st album released on June 26, 1997. All songs written by Makoto Kawamoto without No. 2.

All tracks are written by Makoto Kawamoto, arranged by Tetsuo Ishikawa (unless otherwise noted).

No.	Title	Music	arrangement	Length
1.	"Juppun-mae (10分前, 10 minutes ago)"
2.	"Ai no Sainō (愛の才能, Sense of Love)" (Album version)	Yasuyuki Okamura	Yasuyuki Okamura
3.	"Stone"
4.	"DNA"
5.	"Edge"
6.	"Time Machine"
7.	"Yakisoba Pan (やきそばパン, Bread with Chow mein)"
8.	"LOVE & LUNA"
9.	"Himawari (ひまわり, sunflower)"
10.	"1/2 (Nibun no Ichi)"

==== gobbledygook ====
gobbledygook is Makoto Kawamoto's 2nd album released on March 3, 2001. All songs written by Makoto Kawamoto without No. 5, #7.

No.	Title	Lyrics	Music	arrangement	Length
1.	"Hello♥"	–	Makoto Kawamoto	Hyoe Yasuhara
2.	"Gi'me Shelter (ギミーシェルター, Give me a shelter)" (oridinal edit)	Makoto Kawamoto	Makoto Kawamoto
3.	"Kyarameru (キャラメル, caramel)"	Makoto Kawamoto	Makoto Kawamoto	Hyoe Yasuhara
4.	"Octopus Theater"	Makoto Kawamoto	Makoto Kawamoto	Hyoe Yasuhara
5.	"Haatsu Soopa (ハーツソーパ)" (Instrumental)	–	Hyoe Yasuhara
6.	"Pikapika (ピカピカ, glitter)"	Makoto Kawamoto	Makoto Kawamoto	Tetsuo Ishikawa
7.	"Burein Shugaa (ブレインシュガー, Brain sugar)" (Instrumental)
8.	"Tsuki no Kan (月の缶, A can of the moon)" (sweet edit)	Makoto Kawamoto	Makoto Kawamoto	Tetsuo Ishikawa, Tetsuhiro Miyajima
9.	"Fragile"	Makoto Kawamoto	Eitaro Isono	Eitaro Isono, David Campbell (String section arrangement), Makoto Kawamoto (Choir arrangement)
10.	"Doraibu Shiyouyo (ドライブしようよ, Shall we go for a drive?)"	Makoto Kawamoto	Makoto Kawamoto	Hyoe Yasuhara
11.	"Binetsu (微熱, A slight fever)"	Makoto Kawamoto	Makoto Kawamoto	Tetsuo Ishikawa, Tetsuhiro Miyajima
12.	"Sakura (桜, A cherry blossom)" (album mix)	Makoto Kawamoto	Makoto Kawamoto	Tetsuo Ishikawa
13.	"Tokyo Explosion JP"	Makoto Kawamoto	Makoto Kawamoto	Hyoe Yasuhara
14.	"Hello☆" (Instrumental)	–	Makoto Kawamoto	Hyoe Yasuhara
15.	"Ame ni Utaeba (雨に唄えば, Singin' in the Rain)"	Makoto Kawamoto	Makoto Kawamoto	Hyoe Yasuhara

==== Ongaku no Sekai e Youkoso ====
Ongaku no Sekai e Youkoso is Makoto Kawamoto's 3rd album released on February 19, 2010, by My Best Records. All songs written and produced by Makoto Kawamoto.

All tracks are written by Makoto Kawamoto.

No.	Title	Length
1.	"Ongaku no Sekai e Youkoso (音楽の世界へようこそ, Welcome to the musical world)"
2.	"Doko ni aru? (何処にある?, Where is it?)"
3.	"Yoru no Seitaikei (夜の生態系, Night Ecosystem)"
4.	"I love you (アイラブユー, I love you)"
5.	"Ishi no Seikatsu (石の生活, The life of a stone)"
6.	"Tori (鳥, Bird)"
7.	"Uguisuu (ウグイスー, Bush Warbler)"
8.	"Closet (クローゼット, Closet)"
9.	"Joumon (縄文, the Jomon period)"
10.	"Hen ne (へんね, Strange)"
11.	"Umi (海, Sea)"
12.	"Pontago (ポンタゴ)"
13.	"Maggie's Farm e Youkoso (マギーズファームへようこそ, Welcome to Maggie's Farm)"
14.	"Kotori no Uta (小鳥のうた, Small bird's song)"

Bonus tracks
No.	Title	Distributor	Length
1.	"Ongaku no Sekai e Youkoso" (demo version)	Tower Records
2.	"Yoru no Seitaikei" (live)	HMV
3.	"Fire Dance" (Unreleased)	Disk Union

==== The Complete Singles Collection 1996～2001 ====
The Complete Singles Collection 1996～2001 is Makoto Kawamoto's Greatest hits album released on February 19, 2010, by SMDR GT Music (Sony Music Direct).

Disc1
No.	Title	Length
1.	"Ai no Sainō" (single ver.)
2.	"Sōtai" (B-side of Ai no Sainō)
3.	"DNA"
4.	"Love&Luna" (single mix)
5.	"1/2"
6.	"1" (B-side of 1/2)
7.	"Sakura" (single mix)
8.	"Doughnut no Ring" (B-side of Sakura)
9.	"Pika Pika"
10.	"Heart" (B-side of Pika Pika)
11.	"Binetsu"
12.	"Tsuki no kan" (single version, B-side of Binetsu)
13.	"Fragile"
14.	"Trouble Bus" (B-side of Fragile)

Disc2
No.	Title	Length
1.	"Gimmeshelter" (single ver.)
2.	"Re-Fragile (remixed by Stan Katayam)" (B-side of Gimmeshelter)
3.	"Gimmeshelter (Remixed by EY∃)" (B-side of Gimmeshelter)
4.	"Blossom"
5.	"Alphabet Weeks" (B-side of Blossom)
6.	"Octopus Theater (Stan's Lonely Hammock Version)" (B-side of Blossom)
7.	"Hōseki no Shinwa (宝石の神話, The Myth of jewelry)"
8.	"No.1 Hippie Hop"
9.	"Tasuketeyo Windy (たすけてよWindy, Help me! Windy)"
10.	"Denwa no Mae de (電話の前で, In front of the phone)"
11.	"Ai no Sainō" (backing track)
12.	"DNA" (backing track)
13.	"1/2" (backing track)
14.	"Sakura" (backing track)
15.	"Pika Pika" (backing track)
16.	"Binetsu" (backing track)

=== Collaborations ===
==== MihoMihoMakoto ====
MihoMihoMakoto (ミホミホマコト) is the time-limited music group which Miho Asahi, Miho Moribayashi and Makoto Kawamoto formed, and is their 1st album's title released on July 5, 2006.

No.	Title	Lyrics	Music	arrangement	Length
1.	"I want to be loved"	Savannah Churchill	Savannah Churchill	mihomihomakoto & Kentaro Takahashi
2.	"Gone The Rainbow"	Peter, Paul and Mary	Peter, Paul and Mary	mihomihomakoto & Kentaro Takahashi
3.	"Three Topazs" (instrumental)		Emerson Kitamura	mihomihomakoto & Kentaro Takahashi
4.	"Sunset Blue"	Miho Asahi, May Azuchi	Miho Asahi	mihomihomakoto & Kentaro Takahashi
5.	"Rabato de Kyameru (ラバトでキャメル, A camel in Rabat)"	Kazuyo Kawamoto, Tokugawa Roman	Kazuyo Kawamoto	mihomihomakoto & Kentaro Takahashi
6.	"I want to be loved" (Japanese version)	May Azuchi	Savannah Churchill	mihomihomakoto & Kentaro Takahashi

==== Guest appearance ====
Sparks Go Go
Kibun de Ikō (気分でいこう) – B side song of Sparks Go Go's single Hachigatsu no Yume (八月の夢, Dream in August) released on March 1, 1998. Kawamoto participated in it as a background vocalist.

Jiro Miwa
Iedekko (家出っ娘, runaway girl) – From his album Sour Lemon released on June 2, 2010. Kawamoto participated in it as a background vocalist and also appeared on the music clip.

Chappie
Welcoming Morning (March 9, 1999) – as a background vocalist
Happyending Soulwriter's Council Band (October 10, 1999) – words： pal@pop, music： Makoto Kawamoto, arrangement： pal@pop & Makoto Kawamoto

=== CM songs ===
- Namida no Taiyō (涙の太陽, Crying in a Storm) – Kanebo "ALLIE" (2005)
- Ippai Taberu Kimi ga Suki (いっぱい食べる君が好き, I love you so eat a lot) ~song for boys – Fancl "Calolimit" (2010)

=== Non-recording ===
Namida no Taiyō
Namida no Taiyō (涙の太陽, Crying in a Storm) (2005) is a cover song and a song in adverts of the cosmetics "Allie" of Kanebo.

=== VHS / DVD ===
==== Wasuresōdatta ====
Wasuresōdatta (忘れそうだった, I'm likely to forget.) is a video album (VHS) released on July 21, 1997, by Sony record.

No.	Title	Length
1.	"Ai no Sainō" (Music video)
2.	"DNA~Himawari" (Music video)
3.	"1/2~time machine" (Music video)

==== Sōtai ====
Sōtai (早退, Leaving School early) is a concert tour video (VHS) released on December 12, 1997, by Sony record.

No.	Title	Length
1.	"Jippun-mae"
2.	"Ai no Sainō"
3.	"Sōtai"
4.	"Love & Luna"
5.	"1"
6.	"Time Machine"
7.	"Edge"
8.	"Stone"
9.	"Yakisoba Pan"
10.	"1/2 (Nibun no Ichi)"
11.	"Himawari"
12.	"DNA"

==== ten.cut.plus.clip 1996–2001 ====
ten.cut.plus.clip 1996–2001 is a video album (DVD) released on March 6, 2002, by Epic Record Japan. DVD contains music clips and special videos.

No.	Title	Length
1.	"Ai no Sainō" (Music video)
2.	"DNA" (Music video)
3.	"1/2" (Music video)
4.	"Sakura" (Music video)
5.	"Pika Pika" (Music video)
6.	"Binetsu" (Music video)
7.	"Fragile" (Music video)
8.	"Re-Fragile" (Music video)
9.	"Gimmeshelter" (Music video)
10.	"Blossom" (Music video)

== Tie-ins ==
- "Ai no Sainō": Count Down TV (TBS) the ending theme
- "DNA": Hey! Hey! Hey! Music Champ (Fuji Television) the ending theme (October to December 1996).
- "1/2": Rurouni Kenshin (Fuji Television) 2nd opening theme (Anime television series)
- "Binetsu": Koi no Kami-sama (TBS) theme song (TV drama)
