= The Latch Brothers =

American remix group (2000–03; 2011)

- Genres: Remix
- Years active: 2000-2003, 2011
- Label: Grand Royal
- Spinoff of: Beastie Boys; Mary's Danish
- Past members: Mike D; Chris Wagner; Kenny "Tick" Salcido

The Latch Brothers were an early-2000s American remix group formed by Mike D (Mike Diamond of Beastie Boys), Wag (Chris Wagner of Mary's Danish), and Tick (Kenny Salcido). They were a production group/band/Beastie Boys side project that have remixed artists such as Beastie Boys, At the Drive-In, Murder City Devils, Q-Tip, A.I., The Prunes, BS 2000, Bran Van 3000, Audio Leter, Lykke Li, Kut Masta Kurt's Masters of Illusion, Nelly Furtado, Bhagavan Das, and more.

== History ==
The group created original break beats for special show vinyl made exclusively for Beastie Boys DJ Mixmaster Mike. Prior to the folding of Grand Royal Records, The Latch Brothers also recorded early demos for The Mars Volta (the two song demos were never released) at Matter Music Studios.

The Latch Brothers contributed three and composed five tracks for the Xbox video game Jet Set Radio Future and it was the last official release on Grand Royal Records. The Latch Brothers provided original score and music for Tamra Davis Action Sports film Keep Your Eyes Open, as well as VH1's Single Ladies (TV series). Jet Set Radio Future also features BS 2000, a band which featured Beastie Boys members Ad-Rock and drum-tech and occasional live drummer AWOL.

== See also ==
- Jet Set Radio Future
- Get Some
