= From Dusk =

Studio album by Guitar Vader
- Released: November 9, 2001
- Genre: Indie rock
- Length: 40:07
- Label: Berry Records

Guitar Vader chronology
Wild At Honey (2000)	From Dusk (2001)	Dawn (2003)

From Dusk is the third studio album by Japanese indie rock band Guitar Vader, released on November 9, 2001.

== Track listing ==
1. "パーフェクトバード" – 4:13
2. "CUTTING! EVIL SMILE" – 4:27
3. "BABY-T" - 1:42
4. "The Time slips away" - 3:38
5. "Goodness Happiness" - 3:02
6. "やわらかい" - 3:14
7. "島流し" - 2:59
8. "GVTV" - 3:19
9. "太陽" - 3:41
10. "REFUND GAME" - 4:08
11. "HEAVY METAL COLLECTOR" - 5:44
