= Ford GT90 =

Overview
- Manufacturer: Ford Motor Company
- Production: 1995
- Assembly: Dearborn, Michigan, United States
- Designer: James Hope

Body and chassis
- Class: Concept car
- Body style: 2-door coupé
- Layout: Rear mid-engined, rear-wheel drive
- Platform: aluminium and carbon fibre monocoque chassis with steel for extra torsional rigidity

Powertrain
- Engine: 5.9 L (5,927 cc) quad-turbocharged DOHC V12
- Power output: 720 hp (537 kW; 730 PS)
- Transmission: 5-speed FFD-Ricardo manual

Dimensions
- Wheelbase: 2,946 mm (116 in)
- Length: 4,470 mm (176 in)
- Width: 1,963 mm (77 in)
- Height: 1,140 mm (45 in)
- Curb weight: 1,451 kg (3,199 lb)

Chronology
- Predecessor: Ford GT40 (spiritual)

The Ford GT90 is a concept car that was developed and manufactured by American car maker Ford. It was unveiled in January 1995 at the Detroit Auto Show. As of 2025, the car is owned by Hajek Motorsports Museum, Ames, Oklahoma. It was displayed at the Petersen Automotive Museum's Modern Concepts exhibit from September 2024 to July 2025.

== Design ==
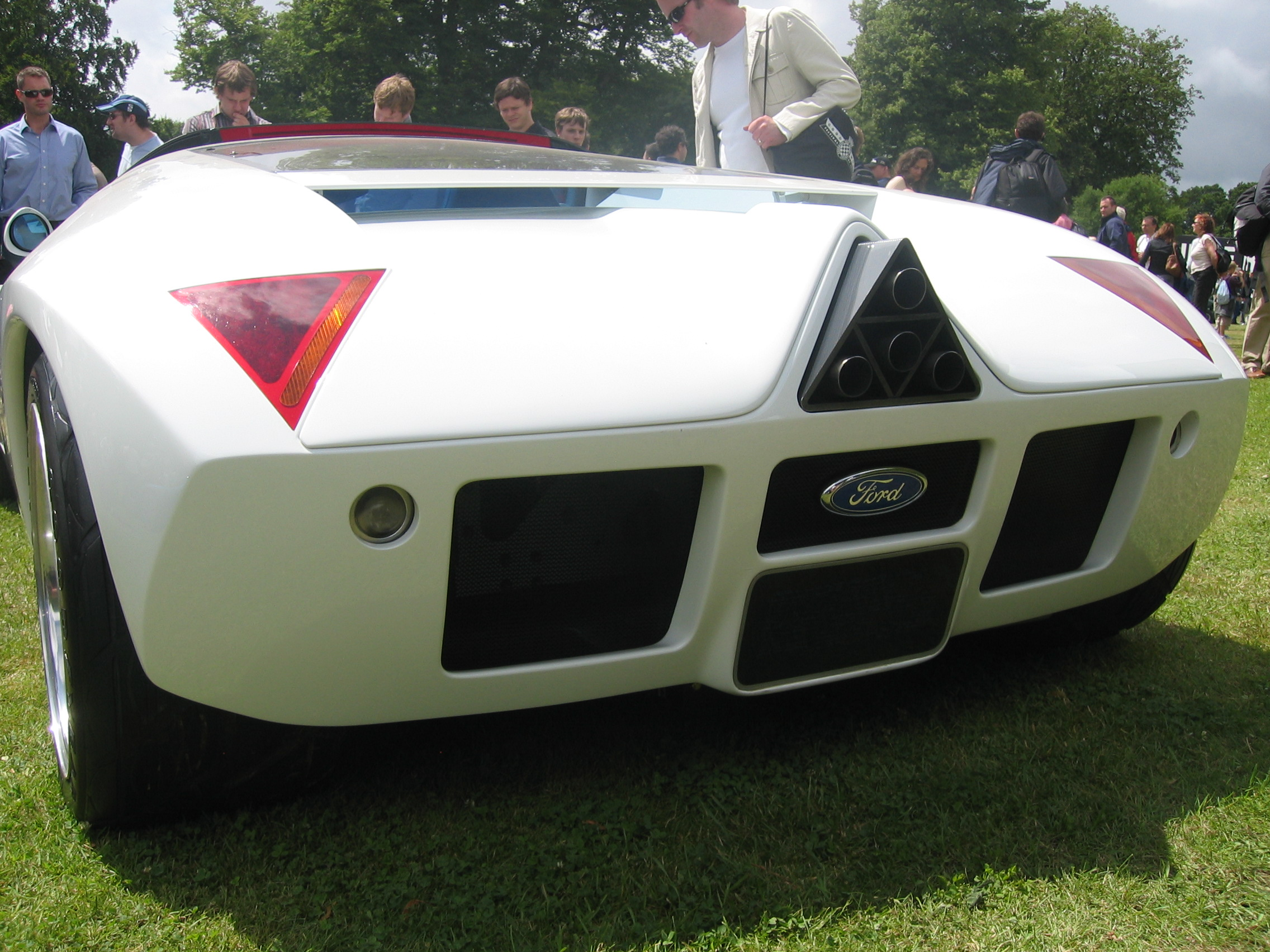
The GT90's design places emphasis on angles, specifically highlighting triangles throughout the car.

The mid-engined GT90 is a spiritual successor to the Ford GT40, taking from it some styling cues, such as doors that cut into the roofline, but little else. In regard to angles and glass, the Ford GT90 was the first Ford to display the company's "New Edge" design philosophy. The GT90 was built around a honeycomb-section aluminum monocoque and its body panels were molded from carbon fiber.

== Specifications ==
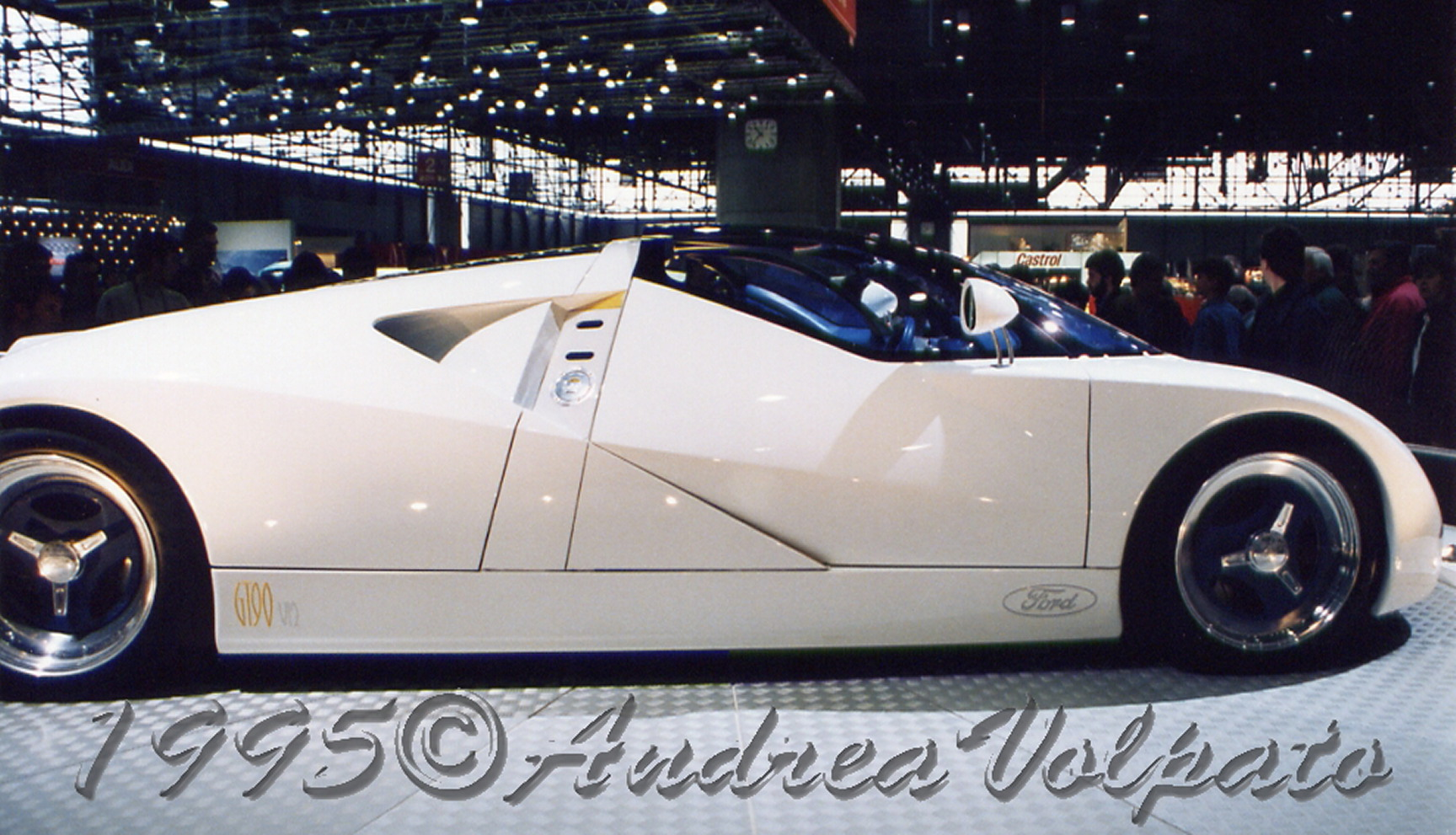
GT90 at the 1995 Geneva Motor Show

The GT90's 48-valve V12 is constructed on an aluminium block and head, displaces 5.9-litres (5,927 cc), and produces an estimated 720 hp (537 kW; 730 PS) and 660 lb⋅ft (895 N⋅m) of torque. It has a redline of 6,300 rpm. It is equipped with a forced induction system that uses four Garrett T2 turbochargers. The engine architecture was based on the 90-degree Ford Modular engine family, based on the same architecture and bore as the 4.6-litre V8 engine, but with four more cylinders added, two more in each cylinder bank, and a shorter stroke. This yielded a 90-degree V12, with a 90.2 mm (3.55 in) bore and a 77.3 mm (3.04 in) stroke with the cylinders arranged in two banks in a single casting. The power produced by the engine is delivered to the rear-wheels through a 5-speed manual transmission developed jointly by FF Developments and Ricardo. The exhaust of the GT90 gets so hot that it would be enough to damage the body panels, and thus ceramic tiles, similar to those on the Space Shuttle, are used to keep the car from melting.

The suspension is a double wishbone variant. The steering is a power-assisted rack-and-pinion. The brakes are ventilated discs.

According to Ford, the GT90, was capable of accelerating from 0–60 mph (0–97 km/h) in 3.1 seconds, 0–100 mph (0–161 km/h) in 6.2 seconds, and had a quarter mile (400 m) time of 10.9 seconds at 140 mph (225 km/h). Top speed was listed as 253 mph (407 km/h).

== Development ==
The GT90 was built as a secret project by a small engineering team in just over six months. It shared many components including the transmission and chassis from the Jaguar XJ220, as Jaguar was also owned by Ford at the time. The V12 engine, unique to the GT90, was developed by using a Lincoln Town Car as a test mule, in which they put the prototype engine in order to refine it.

The GT90 was originally going to be the successor to the Ford GT40 and Ford GT70, and the predecessor to the Ford GT, but after the plan for production was cancelled, the chronology was changed, making the Ford GT the new successor to the GT40 and GT70.

== Media ==
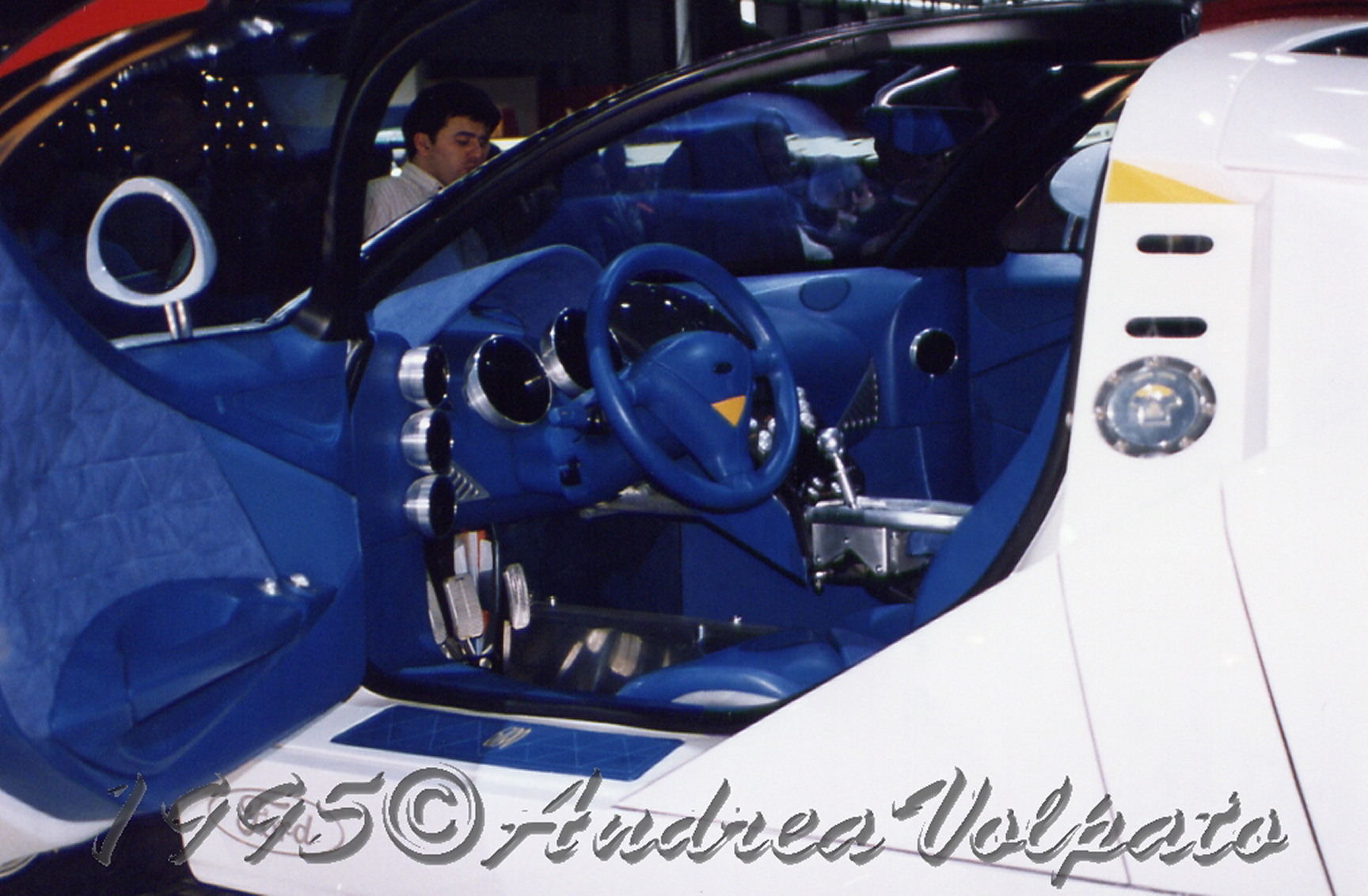
GT90 interior

The Ford GT90 appeared in the video games Need for Speed II, Sega GT 2002, Sega GT Online, Ford Racing 2, Ford Racing 3, Gran Turismo 2, Rush 2: Extreme Racing USA, TOCA Race Driver 2, Top Drives, Project Gotham Racing 3 and Ford Street Racing.

== Top Gear ==
The car was featured on Top Gear in Series 34, Episode 6, tested by Jeremy Clarkson, while the car was still planned to enter production. In that episode, Clarkson was delighted to test the GT90, as he couldn't fit in the Ford GT40 (which resulted in the GT40's test being presented by the former Top Gear presenter Noel Edmonds instead, two episodes earlier). However, his opinion about the GT90 would change, as shown in Series 3, Episode 1, with Clarkson saying "And then, in 1995, there was the GT90. I actually drove this, and it was horrid! Had a top speed of 40, it handled like it was in a cartoon."
