= Sega GT 2002 =

2002 video game

- North American cover art featuring the 2002 Ford GT40 Concept (foreground), the 1995 Ford GT90 (to the right) and a 1966 Ford GT40 Mark II (background)
- Developer: Wow Entertainment
- Publisher: Sega
- Director: Kenichi Imaeda
- Designer: Akihito Fujiwara
- Composer: Masanori Takeuchi
- Platform: Xbox
- Release: Sega GT 2002: NA: September 3, 2002; JP: September 12, 2002; PAL: November 8, 2002; Sega GT Online: JP: December 25, 2003; NA: January 27, 2004; PAL: February 6, 2004
- Genre: Racing
- Modes: Single-player, multiplayer

Sega GT 2002 is a sim racing video game published by Sega in 2002. It is the sequel to Wow Entertainment's Sega GT. Following its initial release as a retail game, it was given away on a disc with Jet Set Radio Future in specially-marked Xbox console packages. Sega released Sega GT Online for the following year, with extra cars and online functionality through Xbox Live. While Xbox Live for the original Xbox was discontinued in 2010, Sega GT Online is now playable online using the replacement Xbox Live servers called Insignia.

== Game features ==
This is the only GT-style game that allows the player to select their opponents directly. Unlike the original game, there are no winnable works cars, even though old racing cars can still be won from races. Some prizes are "special prizes" that can only be won by doing a certain objective. The game makes use of a "damage meter" in lieu of rendered damage, but while it does not affect the handling, it will reduce the awarded prize money at the end of the race. When the player finishes the race with the car unscratched, the game will award a bonus cash prize. In turn, the player will either finish with more or less than the prize money advertised, depending on the meter. Unlike Gran Turismo, the license tests are merely timed laps, instead of separate tests focusing on specific elements of driving.

== Game modes ==
Sega GT 2002 features several different racing game modes. The game's career mode, also titled "Sega GT 2002", starts the player with $13,000 to buy a car to race with. Similar to Gran Turismo, the player earns money by winning races, which can then be used to upgrade their cars or buy faster ones. "Quick Battle" lets the player race against a single CPU opponent or another player, or alternatively watching two CPU opponents race. "Chronicle Mode" allows the player to race in historical cars from the 1960s and early 1970s, upgrading them over time to try to beat newer cars. "Time Attack" is a standard time trial mode where the player races for the fastest lap time on any circuit. Lastly, "Replay Studio" allows for viewing and editing of saved replays.

== Online ==
Sega GT Online was released in Japan in 2003 and the US and Europe in 2004. It featured the addition of "over 40" new cars (now 165+) including Auto Union, Bugatti, and De Tomaso vehicles. Opel vehicles have been removed from this version, while some new tracks, new weather/time of day, new game modes such as "Gathering Mode" were added to arcade mode and "Special Time Triggered Events" for online. Unlike the regular version, it was rated T due to the unpredictable multiplayer interactions. Its cover features a Mazda RX-8.

== Reception ==
=== Sega GT 2002 ===
Sega GT 2002

Aggregate score
Aggregator	Score
Metacritic	82/100

Review scores
Publication	Score
Edge	7/10
Electronic Gaming Monthly	8.33/10
Famitsu	35/40
Game Informer	8.25/10
GamePro	3.5/5
GameRevolution	B
GameSpot	8.2/10
GameSpy	4/5
GameZone	8.5/10
IGN	8.8/10
Official Xbox Magazine (US)	9.1/10
Entertainment Weekly	A−

Sega GT 2002 received "favorable" reviews according to the review aggregation website Metacritic. In Japan, Famitsu gave it a score of 35 out of 40. It was nominated for GameSpot's annual "Best Driving Game on Xbox" award, which went to Rallisport Challenge.

=== Sega GT Online ===
Sega GT Online

Aggregate score
Aggregator	Score
Metacritic	72/100

Review scores
Publication	Score
Edge	6/10
Electronic Gaming Monthly	8.5/10
Famitsu	31/40
Game Informer	7.75/10
GamePro	4/5
GameSpot	6.1/10
GameSpy	3/5
GameZone	7/10
IGN	7/10
Official Xbox Magazine (US)	8.7/10

The online version received slightly more "average" reviews than the original Sega GT 2002 according to Metacritic. In Japan, Famitsu also gave it a score of one eight, one seven, and two eights for a total of 31 out of 40.
