= Sega GT =

2000 video game

- North American cover art featuring the 2000 Dodge Viper GTS-R Concept
- Developers: Wow Entertainment (Note: Credited under the Sega name on the original Japanese Dreamcast release); TOSE
- Publishers: Dreamcast; Sega; Microsoft Windows: JP: Sega; NA: Activision Value; EU: Empire Interactive
- Platforms: Dreamcast; Windows
- Release: Dreamcast: JP: February 17, 2000; NA: August 29, 2000; EU: December 1, 2000; Windows: JP: March 28, 2001; WW: October 19, 2001
- Genre: Sim racing
- Modes: Single player, Multiplayer

Sega GT, released in Japan as Sega GT: Homologation Special (セガGT ホモロゲーションスペシャル, Sega Jī Tī Homorogēshon Supesharu), is a sim racing video game co-developed by Wow Entertainment and TOSE, and published by Sega for their Dreamcast home console. The game was released in 2000. A Microsoft Windows version was published the following year—in Japan by Sega, in North America by Activision Value, and in Europe by Empire Interactive.

Sega GT was intended by Sega to rival Sony's popular Gran Turismo racing series, which was driving the strong sales of the PlayStation console and raising interest in the Dreamcast's closest competitor, the yet-unreleased PlayStation 2. While Sega GT was met with positive reception, sales were only modest, and the Dreamcast was given little traction against its competition. Despite this, Sega would continue the series on the Xbox with a sequel titled, Sega GT 2002 following the demise of the Dreamcast console.

== Gameplay ==
In Sega GT's Championship Mode, the player competes in various races across 22 different tracks in an effort to gain licenses and win cups. Collected prize money can be used to buy additional cars and mechanical parts. The game also features a car creation mode where players can build a custom vehicle from scratch using acquired parts, or can modify any of their existing vehicles.

The game features over 130 selectable cars from manufacturers such as Dodge, Ford, Toyota, and Mitsubishi, with the handling of each being based on the specifications of its real-life counterpart. The European version of Sega GT would include additional cars from Alfa Romeo, Fiat, Mercedes-Benz, Audi, and others.

== Reception ==
Reception

Aggregate score
Aggregator	Score
Metacritic	84/100

Review scores
Publication	Score
AllGame	3.5/5
CNET Gamecenter	9/10
Electronic Gaming Monthly	7.17/10 (Note: Three critics of Electronic Gaming Monthly gave the Dreamcast version each a score of 8/10, 7/10, and 6.5/10.)
EP Daily	7/10
Eurogamer	6/10
Famitsu	33/40
Game Informer	9/10
GameFan	80% (Note: In GameFan's viewpoint of the Dreamcast version, three critics gave it each a score of 73, 82, and 84.)
GameRevolution	B
GameSpot	7.3/10
GameSpy	8.5/10
IGN	9.2/10
Next Generation	5/5
PC Gamer (US)	(PC) 20%

The Dreamcast version of Sega GT received "favorable" reviews according to the review aggregation website Metacritic. Critics praised said console version's generous content and customization options, but found that the controls could sometimes be difficult. Frank O'Connor of NextGen said in the May 2000 issue that reviewing the Japanese import "seems to come down to making comparisons with Gran Turismo, and that's unfortunate, because on its own merits, Sega GT Homologation Special is stunning." Seven issues later, Jeff Lundrigan said of the North American version, "If you only buy one racing game for Dreamcast, make it this one. In fact, run out and buy it anyway, just on principle." Edge, however, gave the Japanese import five out of ten, saying, "The fundamental problem with Sega GT is the game's inability to decide whether to stay close to Sega's arcade roots or venture down the simulation route, choosing instead to hover uncomfortably somewhere in between." In Japan, Famitsu gave said console version a score of 33 out of 40.

Iron Thumbs of GamePro said in one review, "If you want a simple pick-up-and-play racer keep looking. If you know a bit about cars and want a game to spend some serious time on, then look no further than Sega GT." (Note: GamePro gave the Dreamcast version two 4/5 scores for graphics and fun factor, 3.5/5 for sound, and 4.5/5 for control in one review.) However, Air Hendrix later said in another review, "The graphics and frame rate are fine—just not as sexy as the Dreamcast is capable of—but the sounds are pretty generic. All told, Sega GT isn't awful, it just plays like what it is—a pale imitation of a better game." (Note: GamePro gave the Dreamcast version 3.5/5 for graphics, and three 3/5 scores for sound, control, and fun factor in another review.)

== See also ==
- Gran Turismo
- Driving Emotion Type-S
- F355 Challenge
- Metropolis Street Racer
