= Wild at Honey =

Studio album by Guitar Vader
- Released: 2000
- Genre: Alternative rock
- Length: 25:34
- Label: Berry

Guitar Vader chronology
Die Happy! (1999)	Wild at Honey (2000)	From Dusk (2001)

Wild at Honey is the second studio album by Japanese rock band Guitar Vader, released on April 25, 2000, by Berry Records. The album was their first release on Compact Disc, following an album and several short releases on cassette tape. It was named for the Beach Boys album, Wild Honey.

== Track listing ==
1. "Green & Rock'n'Roll" – 4:13
2. "Wild At Honey" – 3:36
3. "Day To Day" - 4:23
4. "Noku Noku Knock" - 3:50
5. "Ringo Melody" - 4:35
6. "S P Y" - 1:50
7. "Lovely Day" - 4:21
