= Dawn (Guitar Vader album) =

Studio album by Guitar Vader
- Released: July 16, 2003
- Genre: Alternative rock
- Length: 35:18

Guitar Vader chronology
| From Dusk (2001) | Dawn (2003) | Happy East (2004) |

Dawn is the fourth studio album by Japanese rock band Guitar Vader, released in 2003. The album was Guitar Vader's first under their own Plugs House label, established after they left the Sony imprint Berry Records. The first track, "Satisfy," is notable for containing many lyrical references to "You Make It Easy" by Air.

== Track listing ==
1. "Satisfy" – 3:33
2. "Mysterious Dirty Girl" – 3:55
3. "Bird Ship" - 4:36
4. "Blue Velvet" - 3:21
5. "真昼の月" - 3:06
6. "Leave Me Alone" - 3:57
7. "Everyday" - 5:14
8. "Cutting Evil Smile Diablo" - 4:24
9. "Satisfy, Kidkut Remix" - 3:12
