= Jet Set Radio =

2000 video game

- European Dreamcast box art
- Developers: Smilebit (Note: Credited under the Sega name on all original Dreamcast releases); BlitWorks (HD)
- Publisher: Sega
- Director: Masayoshi Kikuchi
- Producers: Takayuki Kawagoe; Osamu Sato
- Designer: Masayoshi Yokoyama
- Programmer: Kazuhisa Hasuoka
- Artists: Ryuta Ueda; Kazuki Hosokawa
- Composers: Hideki Naganuma; Richard Jacques; Tomonori Sawada (under alias Toronto)
- Series: Jet Set Radio
- Platforms: Dreamcast, PlayStation 3, Windows, Xbox 360, PlayStation Vita, iOS, Android
- Release: June 29, 2000: Dreamcast; JP: June 29, 2000; NA: October 31, 2000; EU: November 2000; AU: December 22, 2000 PlayStation 3; NA: 2012; PAL: 2012; JP: 2013 Windows; WW: 2012 Xbox 360; WW: 2012; JP: 2013 PlayStation Vita; NA: 2012; PAL: 2012; JP: 2013 iOS; WW: 2012; JP: 2012 Android; WW: 2012; JP: 2013
- Genres: Platformer, action, sports
- Mode: Single-player

Jet Set Radio (Note: Japanese: ジェット セット ラジオ, Hepburn: Jetto Setto Rajio) (originally released in North America as Jet Grind Radio) is a 2000 action-platform video game developed by Smilebit and published by Sega for the Dreamcast. The player controls a member of the GG's, a youth gang that uses inline skates to traverse Tokyo while spraying graffiti, challenging rival gangs, and evading authorities.

Development was headed by director Masayoshi Kikuchi, with art by Ryuta Ueda. The team drew influence from late 1990s Japanese pop culture, such as the rhythm game PaRappa the Rapper, the anti-establishment themes of the 1999 film Fight Club, and elements of 1980s American hip hop culture such as graffiti. The environments were based on the Tokyo districts Shibuya and Shinjuku, with graffiti designed by artists including Eric Haze, who also designed the logo. Jet Set Radio was the first game to use a cel-shaded art style, developed in response to the team's disappointment with the abundance of sci-fi and fantasy Sega games.

Upon its release, Jet Set Radio received universal acclaim for its graphics, soundtrack, and gameplay. The game won several awards while being nominated for many others, and is considered one of the greatest video games of the 2000s and of all time. In 2003, it was followed by a Game Boy Advance version developed by Vicarious Visions, as well as versions for Japanese mobile phones. In 2012, it was re-released for the Xbox 360, PlayStation 3, iOS, Windows, PlayStation Vita and Android. The game also launched a series of sequels, starting with Jet Set Radio Future for the Xbox in 2002, and another being announced by Sega in 2023.

== Gameplay ==
The character Beat performing a grind on rails and tagging graffiti

The player controls a member of the GG's, a gang of graffiti-tagging inline skaters. The game consists of three types of levels: Street, Rival Showdown, and Trial. The Street levels come in two categories. The first is to tag every graffiti point in each area previously tagged by a rival gang before the timer runs out while evading the authorities. The second category serves as a boss battle by chasing the rival gang members and spraying graffiti on them. The more graffiti points are sprayed, the more deadly the authorities become. Graffiti points are marked by arrows and require paint to tag them. Players can spray graffiti by either pressing a single button or inputting commands using the analog stick depending on the size of the graffiti spot. Players are unable to spray graffiti if they run out of paint, which must be refilled by obtaining yellow and blue spray cans scattered across the stage. Yellow spray cans refill a single spray can, and blue spray cans refill five. Enemies will pursue players and attempt to deplete their health. Health can be replenished by obtaining red health spray cans. Performing tricks adds bonus points to the player's overall score and can help the player gain access to areas difficult to reach.

In Rival Showdown levels, more playable characters can be unlocked after they are defeated by matching the rival's movements in technique sections or by spraying graffiti before the rival in race sections. Trial levels are unlocked after Street and Rival Showdown levels are cleared in a specific area. There are three kinds of trials: Jet Graffiti, Jet Tech, and Jet Crash. In Jet Graffiti, the objective is to spray all the graffiti points within the time limit. Jet Tech prioritizes in obtaining the top score within the time limit. In Jet Crash, the objective is to reach the goal and spray graffiti on it before the opponent. Players can customize their graffiti by choosing presets, or create their own using the Graffiti editor. By using a VMU, players can upload their graffiti to the official website for other players to use or download graffiti from other players. More Graffiti presets can be unlocked by collecting Graffiti Soul icons scattered throughout stages.

== Plot ==
DJ Professor K broadcasts the pirate radio station Jet Set Radio to gangs of youths known as the Rudies, who roam Tokyo-to, skating and spraying graffiti as their means of expression. One gang, the GG's, competes for turf with the all-female jilted lovers the Love Shockers in the shopping districts of Shibuya-cho, the cyborg otaku Noise Tanks in the Benten-cho entertainment district, and the kaiju-loving Poison Jam in the Kogane-cho dockyard.

The authorities, led by Captain Onishima, pursue the gangs with riot police and military armaments. After the GG's defeat Poison Jam, Noise Tanks, and Love Shockers in turf wars, they each drop a piece of a mysterious vinyl record. Professor K says that the record is the Devil's Contract and has the power to summon a demon.

The GG's are joined by Combo and Cube, who explain that their hometown, Grind City, has been overtaken by the Rokkaku Group business conglomerate. They ask the GG's to help them to free their friend, Coin, who has been captured by the Rokkaku Group for his vinyl collection. The Rokkaku pursue the GG's and steal the Devil's Contract. Poison Jam explains that the Rokkaku CEO, Goji Rokkaku, plans to use it to make a contract with the demon and take over the world. The GG's defeat Goji on the roof of his headquarters by destroying his turntable, and freedom returns to the streets of Tokyo-to. Combo reveals that the Devil's Contract is an old record with no powers and that wealth had driven Goji to insanity.

== Development ==
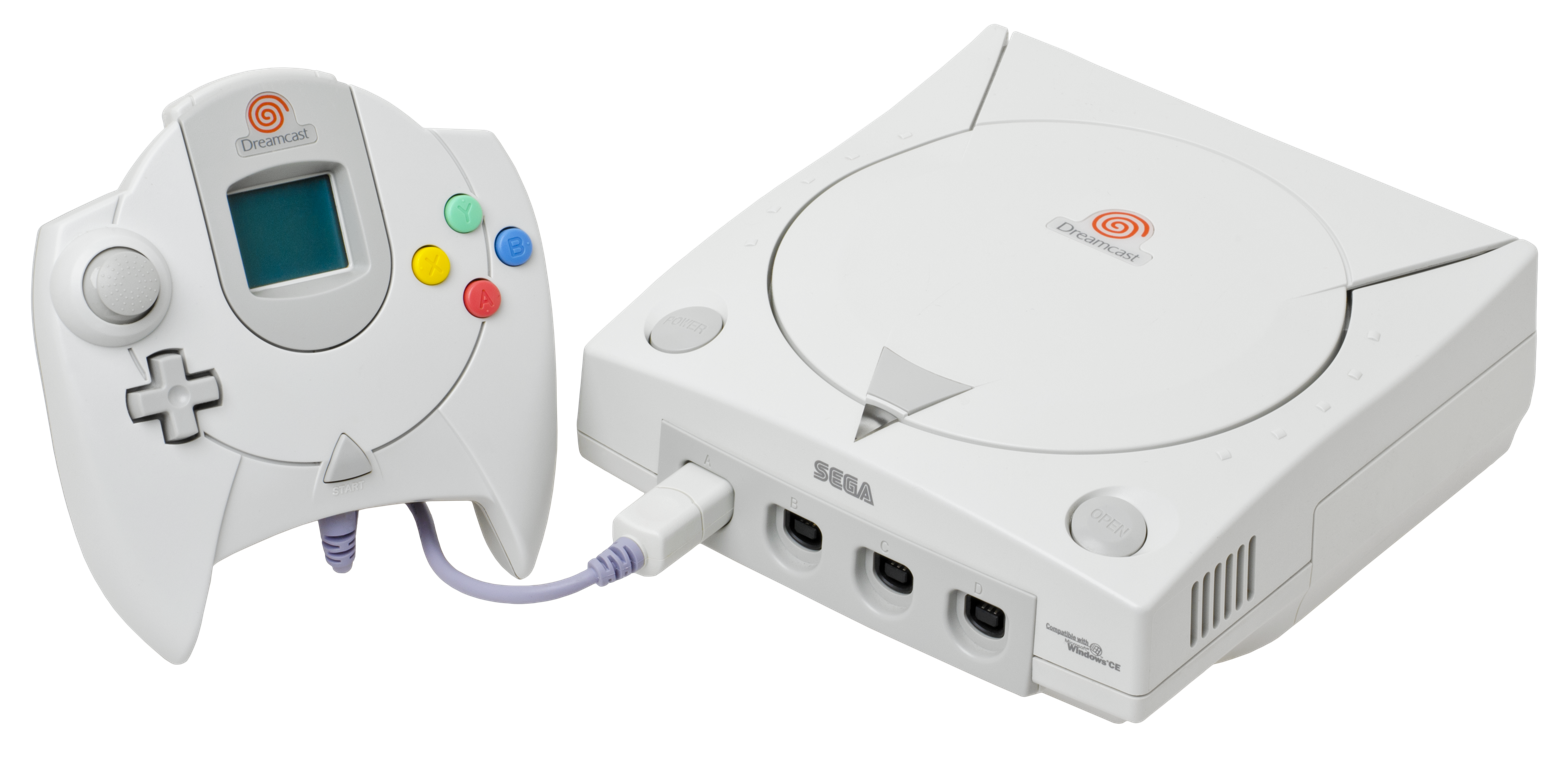
Jet Set Radio was originally developed to the Dreamcast hardware specifications.

Jet Set Radio was developed by Smilebit, a Sega studio formed from members of Team Andromeda, the developers of the Panzer Dragoon games for the Sega Saturn. The development team consisted of fewer than 25 developers, with an average age of under 25. Programming began in mid-1999. The game was presented at the 1999 Tokyo Game Show and drew media attention for its cel-shaded style. During the early stages of development, director Masayoshi Kikuchi had difficulty leading the team without prior directing experience. The visual style was established prior to the gameplay; according to Kikuchi, it could have become an adventure game or role-playing game. His superiors were not satisfied with early concepts, and so Kikuchi used trial and error to develop a concept that he believed everyone would find interesting.

Ueda wanted to create something "cool" that dealt with popular culture and was completely unlike the team's previous game, the 1998 role-playing game Panzer Dragoon Saga. Ueda's drawings of a punky character with headphones and rollerblades became the foundation. Ueda had joined Sega after being impressed by the "freshness" and international appeal of Sonic the Hedgehog, but was disappointed with the excessive focused saturation of overtly fantastical manga and anime-style designs, and hoped to create something original. Smilebit drew inspiration from games outside the typical game genres of science fiction and fantasy. Ueda was particularly inspired by a demonstration of the PlayStation rhythm game PaRappa the Rapper at the 1996 Tokyo Game Show: "I think that's the first game with pop culture like that. They did it first. After that I decided to make a true game, not just a visual experience, that was actually for adults." The anti-establishment themes of the 1999 film Fight Club were another influence.

Smilebit used thicker lines for stand-out objects. Smilebit developed a new cel-shading technique not used at the time as it would not have been possible on the Dreamcast or PlayStation 2. The game features graffiti by a variety of artists, including Eric Haze, who had designed album art for acts including the Beastie Boys and Public Enemy. Smilebit initially planned to make a skateboarding game, but this was changed due to the legs having to be fixed.

Jet Set Radio was one of the earliest games to feature an open 3D world, which presented the team's biggest challenge. Kikuchi said: "Making an entire town in a game was quite the prospect. It's not hard with modern hi-spec hardware, but that wasn't the case back then... It was very difficult from a programming standpoint." Another Sega game developed in that period, Shenmue (1999), featured an open world, but Kikuchi said it posed a different technical challenge, as it does not allow the player to jump or move at speed. The team implemented grinding to allow players to enjoy speed without worrying about colliding with obstacles. Smilebit used a fixed camera in an attempt to reduce motion sickness. They attempted to make Jet Set Radio impossible to duplicate on PlayStation 2 (PS2) by pushing the Dreamcast limitations using bright colors, realistic shadows, and more than sixteen NPCs on-screen without lag, which would have been impossible with the PS2's smaller memory.

The settings were inspired by Japanese locations such as the Tokyo shopping districts of Shibuya and Shinjuku, which Smilebit photographed as references. Sega feared that the art style might alienate international players and requested changes for the international versions. The team added stages based on Times Square and Roosevelt Avenue along Queens and Brooklyn, New York City, and changed the nationality of two characters to American. The interactive credits sequence of the Japanese version was also cut, as localizing it would have meant rebuilding the stage with English names. Sega sold the international version in Japan as De La Jet Set Radio. Ueda was unhappy about the changes, which he said diminished the essential Japanese elements.

=== Promotion and release ===
Jet Set Radio was released in Japan on June 29, 2000. In North America, it was released on October 31 as Jet Grind Radio due to trademark problems for "Jet Set" in the United States at the time. The PAL version was released later on November 24 under the original name. The North American and PAL versions contained two new maps, new songs, and other content designed to increase the appeal to Western audiences. To promote the North American release, Sega of America held a "Graffiti is Art" competition for contestants to enter their own graffiti art pieces to Sega. Sega chose five finalists and flew them into San Francisco, California on October 21, where they competed to make graffiti art pieces on a canvas within a 3 and a half-hour timeframe for a prize of $5000. Mayor of San Francisco, Willie Brown discovered the competition and attempted to revoke Sega of America's permit, but was unsuccessful due to obtaining the permit legally.

=== Soundtrack ===
The Jet Set Radio soundtrack includes original and licensed tracks in genres including J-pop, hip hop, funk, electronic dance, rock, acid jazz, and trip hop. The main theme is called "Let Mom Sleep". The North American version and international rereleases add metal songs. The 2012 port omits "Yappie Feet" and "Many Styles" for licensing reasons.

The music has been described as energetic, rhythm-heavy, defiant, and multicultural. Most of it was composed by Hideki Naganuma, with additional tracks by Richard Jacques, Deavid Soul, Toronto, and B.B. Rights. Naganuma attempted to match the visual style, and experimented with voices, cutting, and rearranging samples to the point that they became nonsensical. In 2012, Naganuma said Jet Set Radio and its sequel were his favorite projects. Smilebit worked with Sega of America and Sega of Europe to include as many street culture elements as possible, hoping to create music that was internationally acceptable.

A soundtrack CD, Jet Grind Radio Music Sampler, was given to those who pre-ordered the game in the US, featuring 10 tracks, four of which do not appear in any version of Jet Set Radio. It was distributed by Interscope Records. The soundtrack CD Jet Set Radio Original Soundtrack (UPCH-1048) featured 19 tracks including a data track from the game and was distributed by Polydor Records on December 20, 2000, in Japan. For the HD release, a new soundtrack CD, Jet Set Radio: Original Soundtrack with Bonus Tracks from JSRF, was distributed by Sumthing Else on September 18, 2012, for North America and Europe, containing 17 tracks. A second soundtrack for the HD version, Jet Set Radio Sega Original Tracks, was distributed by Sega, containing 15 tracks and was released on iTunes on October 3, 2012, alongside Jet Set Radio Future Sega Original Tracks.

== Alternative versions ==
Sega re-released Jet Set Radio in Japan under the name De La Jet Set Radio. (Note: デ・ラ・ジェット セット ラジオ, De Ra Jetto Setto Rajio) This version was released on October 18, 2001, in Japan via Dreamcast Direct (later renamed Sega Direct) and included a T-shirt featuring the protagonist Beat for those who pre-ordered. This version features content that was originally exclusive to PAL and North American versions, namely music from the PAL release, two playable characters, and two stages.

=== Mobile versions ===
Jet Set Radio was remade as two 2D mobile versions. The first, Typing Jet, (Note: タイピング ジェット, Taipingu Jetto) a side-scrolling game in which players escape police, was released for Japanese mobile phones by Sega on June 22, 2001. It was followed by a remake for Game Boy Advance developed by Vicarious Visions and published by THQ in North America on June 26, 2003, and in Europe on February 20, 2004. The Game Boy Advance version uses the Tony Hawk's Pro Skater 2 engine and an isometric perspective, and it emulates the cel-shaded graphics of the Dreamcast game, with some original stages and shortened songs.

=== High-definition remaster ===
In 2012, high-definition ports developed by BlitWorks were released for PlayStation 3, Xbox 360, Windows, PlayStation Vita, iOS, and Android. The ports add features, including widescreen HD graphics, online leaderboards, achievements, and a new camera system. It combines the North American, European, and Japanese versions' soundtracks and adds bonus tracks from Jet Set Radio Future, but it omits the PAL version's tracks "Yappie Feet" and "Many Styles". To promote the ports, Sega ran a contest to allow players to submit their own artwork to be used as graffiti in the game. The game was made backwards-compatible with the Xbox One in May 2016.

In North America, the PS3 version was released on September 18, with PlayStation Plus members able to purchase it early on September 11. The PS3 version was released in Europe the following day alongside The Xbox Live Arcade and Windows version for both North America and Europe. The PlayStation Vita version was scheduled for release on October 16, but was delayed for development optimization reasons; it was released on November 20 in North America and in Europe the following day. The PS3, Xbox 360, and PlayStation Vita versions were released in Japan simultaneously on February 20, 2013.

The iOS and Android versions were released in North America and Europe on November 29, 2012. Japan received the iOS version on December 20, 2012, and Android on January 30, 2013. The smartphone versions were delisted as of 2015 due to compatibility problems with iOS updates. The Xbox 360 version of Jet Set Radio was delisted off the Xbox Live Arcade store in February 2023, but is still available for download for those who own it.

== Reception ==
=== Critical reception ===
Reception

Aggregate scores
Aggregator	Score
GameRankings	SDC: 92% GBA: 76%
Metacritic	SDC: 94/100; GBA: 74/100; PS3: 75/100; X360: 70/100 iOS: 58/100

Review scores
Publication	Score
AllGame	4.5/5
Eurogamer	HD: 9/10
Famitsu	32/40
Game Informer	HD: 6.5
GameFan	97/100
GameSpot	9/10
GamesRadar+	HD: 4/5
IGN	9.6/10
Next Generation	4/5
Pocket Gamer	HD: 2.5/5
TouchArcade	HD: 3.5/5
DC-UK	9/10
ODCM (US)	10/10
Gamers' Republic	A

Awards
Publication	Award
Game Critics Awards	Best Console Game
Game Developers Choice Awards	Excellence in Visual Arts, Game Spotlights Award
GameSpot	Best Graphics, Artistic
Gamers' Republic	Best 3D Game Design

Jet Set Radio received universal acclaim for its gameplay, visual style, and music. Gamers' Republic called it flawless. IGN praised the extra gameplay modes, saying they added replay value. Official Dreamcast Magazine (ODCM) found the exaggerated physics and interactivity of the levels immersive. DC-UK described the gameplay as a combination of Crazy Taxi and Tony Hawk and concluded that the gameplay was better than both. GameSpot praised the pacing, stating that the beginning of the game is simple and slowly becomes more challenging as the player progresses. GameFan was not impressed with the early stages, but their opinion changed as they progressed and were happy with the result. Next Generation found the story modifications of the English versions jarring, although, he complimented the new stages, calling them "impressive" and "a worthy addition to Japanese cityscapes of the original". The camera controls were commonly criticized, but most reviewers said the overall quality outweighed them.

IGN said the visual style "looks like a moving cartoon, and every character, right down to the police dogs, is practically overflowing with personality ... It has the type of look that makes non-gamers can't help but be impressed". ODCM called it "gorgeous" and compared it to the move to color television. DC-UK also praised it for resembling a 2D cartoon in 3D space, and considered it ground-breaking. GamePro wrote that the visuals were unique and that the stylized design was convincing and fun.

GamePro called Jet Set Radio one of the best-sounding games of the year for its soundtrack, and ODCM said it had "one of the best soundtracks ever". IGN also praised the soundtrack, but was critical of the tracks added to the North American release, in particular songs from Rob Zombie. Next Generation, however, did not consider the new tracks to make a difference, stating the soundtrack was incredible from the start. GameSpot said the soundtrack fit the environment perfectly.

Reviewing the remaster, GamesRadar+ said it was is a joy to play even 12 years later. Eurogamer called the visual style "timeless ... 12 years on and this is a surprisingly rigorous game built of oddball delights, then, and the HD updating has only enhanced its charms. The skating's still great, the city's still a joy to explore, and the soundtrack's still one of the very best ever put together." Game Informer found the gameplay archaic and frustrating and that, in retrospect, the visual style had blinded them to its faulty gameplay. TouchArcade and Pocket Gamer criticized the smartphone versions for the touchscreen controls and were unable to keep up with challenges.

Across all versions, including the original and re-releases, sales of Jet Set Radio surpassed 1 million copies worldwide.

=== Accolades ===
Jet Set Radio won the Best Console Game at the E3 Game Critics Awards in 2000 and was the runner up for Best in Show at the same event. The game won the category of "Excellence in Visual Arts" award, received a "Game Spotlights Award" and was nominated for Game of the year at the 2001 Game Developers Choice Awards. Jet Set Radio received nominations for the "Game of the Year", "Console Game of the Year", "Console Innovation", "Art Direction", "Game Design", "Original Musical Composition", "Sound Design", and "Visual Engineering" categories at the 4th Annual Interactive Achievement Awards (the most nominated game at that ceremony). It won GameSpot's annual "Best Graphics, Artistic" award among console games, and was nominated in the "Best Game Music" and "Best Platform Game" categories. Gamers' Republic awarded it "Best 3D Game Design" in its 2000 Year in Review. The game was also featured in 1001 Video Games You Must Play Before You Die. Jet Set Radio also holds a Guinness World Record for the first video game to use cel-shading.

== Legacy ==
Jet Set Radio is recognized as one of the first games to feature cel-shaded graphics, with exaggerated shapes, thick lines, and flat, bright colors. Insomniac owner Ted Price credited it as an influence on their game Sunset Overdrive. Numerous indie developers have cited Jet Set Radio as a major influence on their games, the most notable being the successfully crowdfunded Hover: Revolt of Gamers, Lethal League, and Bomb Rush Cyberfunk, all of which draw heavy inspiration from Jet Set Radio's visuals and music and feature contributions from its composer, Hideki Naganuma. The game has also been speedrun at Games Done Quick multiple times. Other fan community-based Jet Set Radio projects include Jet Set Radio Live, a 24/7 browser-based radio station based on the fictional radio station in-game created in January 2016 and the albums Memories of Tokyo-To released on February 20, 2018, and Sounds of Tokyo-To Future by American musician 2 Mello on August 24, 2021.

Musician Arca stated that her 2020 single "@@@@@" was, in hindsight, influenced by Jet Set Radio, a game she had been "obsessed with" on the Dreamcast.

A sequel, Jet Set Radio Future, was released for the Xbox in 2002. Beat and Gum are playable characters in Sega Superstars Tennis and Sonic & All-Stars Racing Transformed, and Beat appears in Sonic Universe issue #45, an adaptation of the game along with Sonic & Sega All-Stars Racing.

In 2009, IGN named Captain Onishima the 95th-greatest video game villain. Jet Set Radio and Jet Set Radio Future are highly requested games to be ported to the Xbox One, the Xbox Series X/S, and the Nintendo Switch. In 2021, Sega announced Beat as a playable character for Super Monkey Ball Banana Mania. Sega announced a new Jet Set Radio game at the Game Awards 2023.
