= DC-UK =

British video game magazine

- DC-UK #16, November 2000
- Editor: Caspar Field; Keith Stuart; Lee Hart
- Categories: Video games magazines
- Frequency: Monthly
- First issue: August 1999
- Final issue Number: March 2001; 20
- Company: Future plc
- Country: United Kingdom
- Language: English
- ISSN: 1467-5250

DC-UK was a Dreamcast video game magazine published by Future plc in the United Kingdom. Its first issue was published in August 1999 and it ran until 2001. The magazine was launched by ex-Edge deputy editor Caspar Field, who edited the first seven issues. After his departure to launch the children's Dreamcast magazine, Mr Dreamcast, associate editor Keith Stuart took over until issue 19. At this point, then-deputy editor Lee Hart took over for the single issue that remained.

== History ==
At launch, DC-UK changed the prevailing Future plc games magazine running order of the time, which went news - previews - features - reviews - tips - letters, by rearranging some of the major sections. This resulted in a running order of reviews - news - features - previews - tips - letters. The magazine also offered some additional content, such as interviews with game developers and attempts at unusual features, such as creating cocktails themed around famous Sega characters. Following Field's departure, DC-UK reverted to the standard Future plc format, which was used until the magazine's closure.

Sales of DC-UK, particularly during the early months of its existence, were strong – often coming close to those of the Official Dreamcast Magazine (UK) despite the latter selling with a cover-mounted disc featuring demo versions of games. DC-UK had in fact started life as Future Publishing's pitch for the rights to the UK Dreamcast magazine license. However, Sony Computer Entertainment Europe (SCEE), from which Future held the rights to the Official UK PlayStation Magazine, objected, leading Future to withdraw its bid for the Dreamcast deal.

In March 2000 Future published the first issue of the short-lived DC-UK spin-off title DC-TIPS. Both DC-TIPS and DC-UK's sales began to suffer during early 2000 as British public interest in Dreamcast declined during the run-up to PlayStation 2's November 2000 arrival in Europe.

During the magazine's run it was supported by a website at dc-uk.co.uk. This closed on 8 March 2001, shortly after the magazine's last issue had gone on sale, with the message 'Goodbye folks!'.

== DC-TIPS ==
DC-TIPS
- Editor: Will Groves
- Categories: Video games magazines
- Frequency: Monthly
- First issue: March 2000
- Final issue Number: May 2000; 3
- Company: Future plc
- Country: United Kingdom
- Language: English

DC-TIPS was a magazine dedicated to game guides and tips for the Dreamcast and each issue was on average 128 pages long, for the price of £3.99. The magazine was launched as a companion to DC-UK and the two magazines were offered to readers in a special combination subscription. Issue #1 was published in March 2000, 7 months after "parent" magazine. The magazine was cancelled before issue #4 went to press, with most of the latest issue completed. Some of the commissioned work for future issues included Star Wars: Episode I Racer and Resident Evil – Code: Veronica.

The magazine was launched by Will Groves who was editor for the lifetime of the magazine. Richard Owen joined as the full-time staff writer halfway through the creation of the first issue. In charge of art was Brad Merrett and the designer was Efrain Mendoza. Contributors to the magazine included Dean Mortlock, Nadine Pittam, Daniel Glenfield, Sally Meddings and Jon Billington.

The colour orange was prevalent throughout the magazine, complimenting DC-UK's prevalent blue. The Dreamcast logo in Europe was blue, and in the US and Japan it was orange. This made orange an obvious choice for DC-TIPS given that the design was so closely tied to its parent DC-UK.

Although its run of magazines was short, DC-TIPS covered a relatively large number of games throughout its pages. The magazine would begin with a set of featured games with guides taking up between 5 (Sega Bass Fishing) and 20+ pages (MDK2). At the back of the magazine was a section named "Listings" which had tips for most games on the Dreamcast system. These tips would be between a short paragraph and six pages. The style in the Listings section was much more compact than in the front of the magazine.

Some of the games featured included:

- Chu Chu Rocket
- Crazy Taxi
- Evolution
- JoJo's Bizarre Adventure
- MDK2 (Cover Art)
- NBA 2K
- Power Stone
- Rayman 2
- Resident Evil 2
- Sega Bass Fishing
- Shadow Man
- Slave Zero
- Sonic Adventure
- Soul Calibur
- Tomb Raider: The Last Revelation (Cover Art)
