= Roommania 203 =

2000 video game

Roommania #203
- Dreamcast cover art
- Developer: Wave Master
- Publisher: Sega
- Composer: Tomoko Sasaki
- Platforms: Dreamcast; PlayStation 2
- Release: Dreamcast: JP: January 27, 2000; PlayStation 2: JP: July 25, 2002
- Genre: Life simulation
- Mode: Single-player

Roommania #203 is a life simulation game developed by Wave Master and published by Sega, initially for the Dreamcast in 2000 and for the PlayStation 2 in 2002. The player assumes the role of an omniscient being who observes and influences the life of Neji Taihei, a man whose apartment you occupy. A sequel, New Roommania: Porori Seishun, was released on the PlayStation 2 in 2003.

== Synopsis and gameplay ==
The player assumes the role of an omniscient god-like being that resides in the apartment of an average young Japanese man named Neji Taihei, and whose actions transform Neji's mundane existence into a dramatic and tumultuous one.

Gameplay alternates between two modes, depending on whether Neji is present in the apartment. At times when Neji occupies the apartment, the player can draw his attention to specific objects by throwing polygonal balls at them. When he has left, the player can freely roam the apartment from a first-person perspective, where they can perform actions such as reading Neji's journal or rearranging objects.

The player is tasked with various objectives that they may influence Neji into doing, such as setting his alarm clock or bleaching his hair blonde. The game contains four possible storylines, depending on which objectives are completed by the player.

== Development and release ==
The original concept and music for Roommania #203 were created by Tomoko Sasaki of Wave Master, a studio within Sega. Wave Master originated as Sega's music production group, but contained a subcommittee that fielded proposals for games that it could potentially develop. Sasaki suggested a game in which a Wave Master employee is closely followed for a single day, which formed the initial concept of a game that occurred entirely within a single room. She based Roommania #203 on her interest in Y2K-era webcamming culture, such as idols who publicly streamed themselves and websites showing fixed-point cameras from around the world.

Serani Poji, a fictional musical group within the game, was jointly developed by Sasaki, producer Yukihiro Fukutomi, and singer Yukichi. The group is heavily influenced by the Shibuya-kei music genre, and would go on to release several records as a legitimate musical group.

Roommania #203 was released solely in Japan for the Dreamcast on January 27, 2000, and was ported to PlayStation 2 on July 25, 2002. A sequel, New Roommania: Porori Seishun, was released on the PlayStation 2 in 2003.

== Reception and legacy ==
Roommania #203 was positively reviewed by the Japanese video game press upon its initial release. Colin Williamson of IGN said that he was "pretty baffled" by Roommania #203, comparing its surreal gameplay to the 1999 video game Seaman.

In 2017, FuRyu announced that it was developing a video game titled Project One Room for PlayStation 4 as a spiritual successor to Roommania #203, to be published by Sega with Sasaki returning as the game's composer. The game was cancelled in 2021.
