= Jet Set Radio Future =

2002 video game

- North American box art
- Developer: Smilebit
- Publisher: Sega
- Director: Masayoshi Kikuchi
- Producer: Takayuki Kawagoe
- Designer: Masayoshi Yokoyama
- Programmer: Kazuhisa Hasuoka
- Artist: Ryuta Ueda
- Writer: Ryuta Ueda
- Composers: Hideki Naganuma; Richard Jacques
- Series: Jet Set Radio
- Platform: Xbox
- Release: February 22, 2002: JP: February 22, 2002; NA: February 26, 2002; PAL: March 14, 2002
- Genres: Platformer, action, sports
- Modes: Single-player, multiplayer

Jet Set Radio Future (Note: Japanese: JSRF ジェットセットラジオフューチャー, Hepburn: Jetto Setto Rajio Fyūchā) is a 2002 action game developed by Smilebit and published by Sega for the Xbox. It is the sequel to the 2000 Dreamcast game Jet Set Radio, and as a re-imaging of the original game, Jet Set Radio Future maintains its predecessor's cel-shaded visuals while introducing refined gameplay mechanics, updated graphics, larger open world environments, new characters, an altered plot, a new soundtrack and multiplayer gameplay. As with the first game, the player controls members of the GG's, a youth street gang that uses inline skates to traverse a futuristic Tokyo, spraying graffiti, challenging rival gangs and evading authorities.

Jet Set Radio Future received acclaim, with praise for its music, art style, gameplay, characters, and replay value. It was nominated and won several awards, including "Best Platformer," "Best Music," and "Best Graphics (Artistic)" from GameSpot. Originally developed for the Dreamcast, it was released as a Xbox launch game in Japan and Europe and was later bundled with Xbox consoles along with Sega GT 2002. Jet Set Radio Future became backwards compatible on Xbox 360 in 2005. Jet Set Radio Future is often named one of the best original Xbox games and one of the best games of the 2000s.

In 2022, Sega announced that a new Jet Set Radio project was in development as part of a revival of previous franchises. Subsequent reports in 2023 and 2024 described leaked development footage and screenshots.

== Gameplay ==
The character Yoyo tagging graffiti on a wall

Jet Set Radio Future is a third-person action game in which players control inline skaters navigating open urban environments in Tokyo, the main setting of the game. Gameplay centers on performing tricks while tagging graffiti to claim territory and progress through the game’s districts. In the story mode, players are tasked with overwriting graffiti left by rival gangs across Tokyo while avoiding interruption from enemies and police forces.

Graffiti mechanics were simplified from the original Jet Set Radio, replacing manual spraying over large tags with multiple spray targets that scale in number based on graffiti size, while removing time limits on tagging objectives. Players encounter rival gangs throughout stages, triggering combat encounters that must be cleared in order to progress. Battles occur within the game’s open environments rather than isolated arenas. Preview coverage featured in Dorimaga highlighted several mechanical changes from Jet Set Radio intended to emphasize speed and momentum, including a boost system designed to support sustained movement across larger stages. In addition, encounters with rival gangs and police are structured around more dynamic, situational objectives rather than constant pursuit, reinforcing a focus on flow and trick-chaining over time-based pressure. Graffiti mechanics are presented as more integrated into movement, allowing players to spray while maintaining speed instead of stopping play entirely.

Designated graffiti stops allow players to save progress, change playable characters, and replenish spray cans without exiting the stage. Stages also feature hidden collectible items, such as mystery tapes and Graffiti Souls, which unlock additional content and graffiti designs when found. In addition to tagging pre-designed graffiti, Jet Set Radio Future includes a built-in graffiti editor that allows players to create and customize their own graffiti designs. Using an in-game interface, players can draw freehand shapes, apply stamps, adjust colors and thickness, add lettering, and modify individual elements before saving designs to the system memory. Custom graffiti can then be used during gameplay in place of preset designs.

The police, who previously chased after the player in the last game, now appear in specific areas, with the player tasked with stopping them by charging into them and spraying them to defeat them. In addition, the expanded city environments were divided into distinct districts, with contemporary Japanese-inspired stage names as such as Shibuya Terminal and Rokkaku-dai as examples of the game’s traversal-focused stage design. Dorimaga further detailed the structure of the game’s city, identifying multiple districts unlocked through progression, including areas such as Dogenzaka, Chuo Street, 99th Street, and an underground sewer facility. The feature described advancement as occurring street by street, with each district introducing new challenges and traversal demands while remaining integrated into the larger urban environment rather than functioning as isolated levels.

=== Controls ===
Jet Set Radio Future uses an analog control scheme centered on momentum and directional input. Players control movement with the left analog stick, allowing for walking or skating depending on pressure applied, while jumps are performed using a face button, with jump height scaling based on button hold duration. Camera orientation can be corrected manually to maintain forward momentum and visibility.

Graffiti actions are context-sensitive and are activated at designated graffiti points. When positioned correctly, players initiate tagging using a trigger input, with larger graffiti requiring sustained input across multiple spray targets. Movement-based abilities such as boost dashes are also tied to spray can resources, linking control inputs directly to speed and survivability.

Additional controls allow players to perform grinding tricks, aerial maneuvers, wall rides, and combo actions while skating. Trick inputs vary depending on whether the player is grinding, airborne, or interacting with environmental objects, encouraging continuous motion and precise timing rather than stationary actions. The control layout emphasizes fluid transitions between skating, jumping, grinding, and tagging rather than discrete combat commands.

Rather than using conventional combat mechanics, Jet Set Radio Future players use spray paint as an offensive mechanic. Police units act as obstacles, attempting to interrupt the player’s movement or prevent graffiti tagging. Players counter these threats by maintaining speed, using environmental routes, deploying boost dashes, and completing graffiti actions to disrupt or evade opponents. Spray cans function both as a resource for graffiti and as a means to activate movement-based abilities, linking traversal directly to player survivability.

=== Multiplayer ===
Jet Set Radio Future includes local multiplayer modes for up to four players. The game’s Versus Mode features multiple competitive mission types, including City Rush, Ball Hog, Flag, Graffiti Wars, and Tagger’s Tag, each with distinct objectives such as racing, item control, or competitive graffiti tagging.

In a 2001 interview with IGN, Smilebit producer Takayuki Kawagoe stated that the team was exploring online functionality for the game during development, though specific details had not yet been finalized.

== Plot ==
Set in a futuristic Tokyo, Jet Set Radio Future follows a group of underground roller-skating youths known as the GGs, who use graffiti to mark territory and express identity while evading authorities. The city is dominated by the Rokkaku Group, a powerful megacorporation that exerts control over politics, industry, and culture through its private police force, the Rokkaku Police. As the GGs expand their influence across the city, DJ Professor K broadcasts pirate radio commentary that frames events and narrates the growing conflict between youth subcultures, rival gangs, and the Rokkaku regime. The struggle culminates in a confrontation with Rokkaku Gouji, head of the Rokkaku Group and new mayor of Tokyo, whose plans to consolidate power through the Rokkaku Expo are ultimately disrupted.

=== Characters ===
The game features a cast of stylized characters drawn from Tokyo’s underground culture, rival gangs, and corporate authority. The GGs, the primary protagonists of the game, are a group of roller-skating youths who use graffiti to mark territory and resist the control of the Rokkaku Group. The core members of the group include Corn, Gum, Yoyo, Beat, and Roboy. Many other members join the team throughout the game such as Rhyth, Boogie, Soda, and most notably Combo, Cube, Garam, Jazz, and Clutch who all assist and reveal plot-sensitive information to the GGs regarding the Rokkaku Group. DJ Professor K acts as the guide for the youths, and controls the pirate broadcasting station, called Jet Set Radio. He also serves as the narrator, providing commentary that frames the story’s events and themes. In interviews published around the game’s release, members of the development team described the use of Professor K as a narrative device intended to frame the game’s setting and themes, blending street culture, music, and exaggerated urban identity rather than conventional storytelling.

The primary antagonists of the game are the Rokkaku Group, who pose as a powerful megacorporation that dominates Tokyo. Key figures include Rokkaku Gouji, the company’s head and new mayor of Tokyo, and Inspector Hayashi, who leads enforcement efforts against street gangs. In early stages of the game, the GGs also avoid policemen and the chief of police, Captain Hayashi. Throughout the game, the GGs clash with rival groups such as Poison Jam, Rapid 99, Noise Tanks, Immortals, Love Shockers, Doom Riders and Rokkaku's assassin group the Golden Rhinos, each representing different subcultures within the city.

== Development and release ==
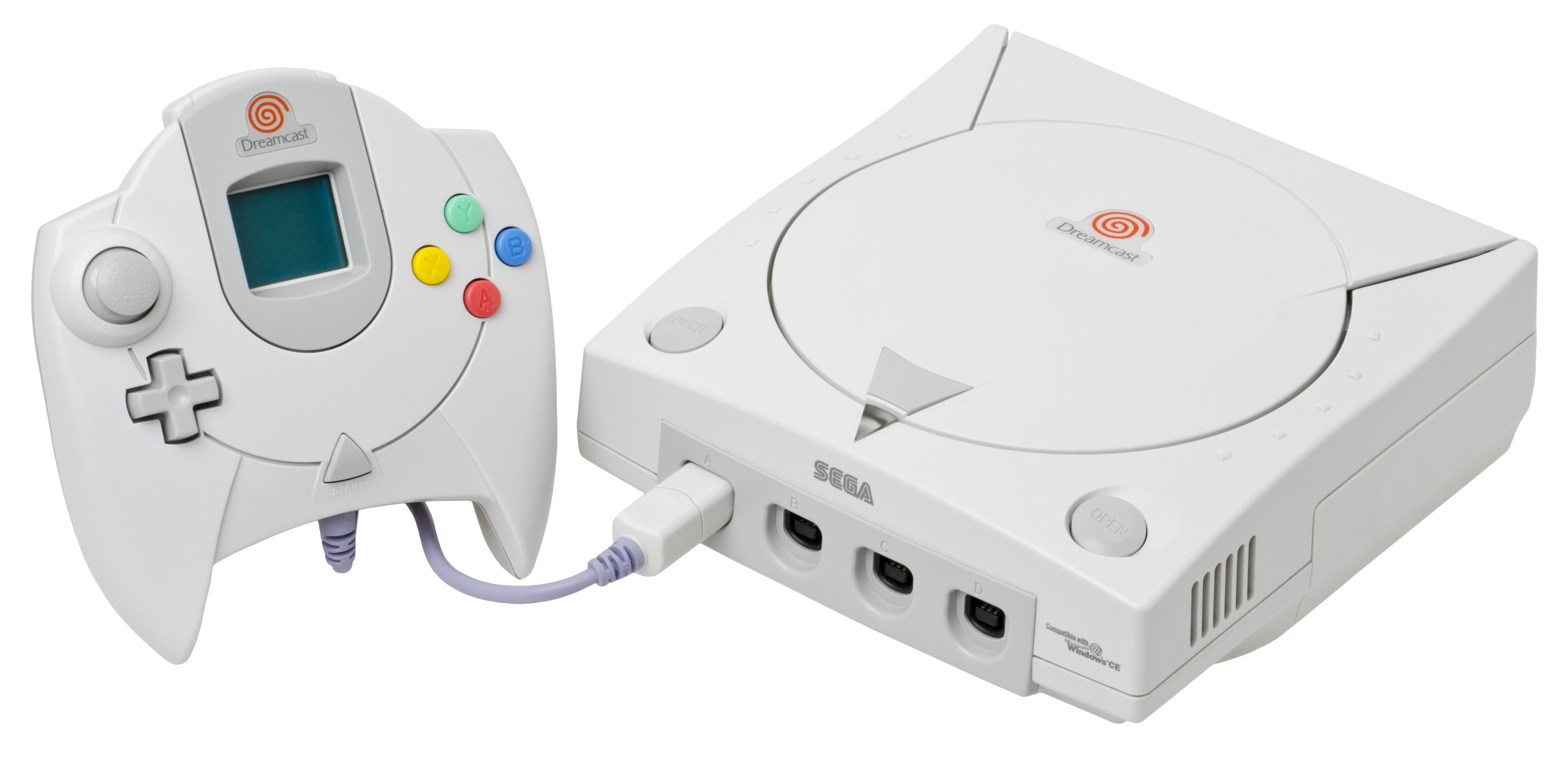
Jet Set Radio Future was initially planned to be released on the Sega Dreamcast (pictured), and was later developed to be an Xbox-exclusive game after the console was discontinued in 2001.

Jet Set Radio Future was first scheduled as a Dreamcast game. Early coverage in Dreamcast Magazine (Dorimaga) described the game as building on the core concepts and visual style of the original Jet Set Radio during a period of transition at Sega. The feature placed the project within the company’s shift away from the Dreamcast, noting that its development reflected changing technical priorities and an increased emphasis on scale and presentation as Sega moved toward new hardware platforms, including the Xbox.

Several members of the development team had previously worked on Sega’s Panzer Dragoon series as part of Team Andromeda.

In a feature published by Official Xbox Magazine, early coverage emphasized the game’s expanded environments and increased emphasis on stylish movement, with developers highlighting larger, more detailed city spaces designed for exploration and extended trick chains. Producer Takayuki Kawagoe stated that the game’s settings were inspired by Tokyo but were not intended as literal recreations, instead presenting a stylized, cel-shaded interpretation.

According to Sega product manager Rich Briggs, the development team distinguished between graffiti as illegal vandalism and graffiti as artistic expression, framing the latter as a stylistic and narrative device rather than an endorsement of real-world vandalism. He stated that some players struggled with the original game's difficulty and did not clearly understand the narrative framing of graffiti. Briggs also indicated that stated that these issues led the development team to place greater emphasis on character and story in Jet Set Radio Future. Lead composer Hideki Naganuma stated that Jet Set Radio Future's story is not a continuation of the original Jet Set Radio's story, but an alternate story set in an alternate reality.

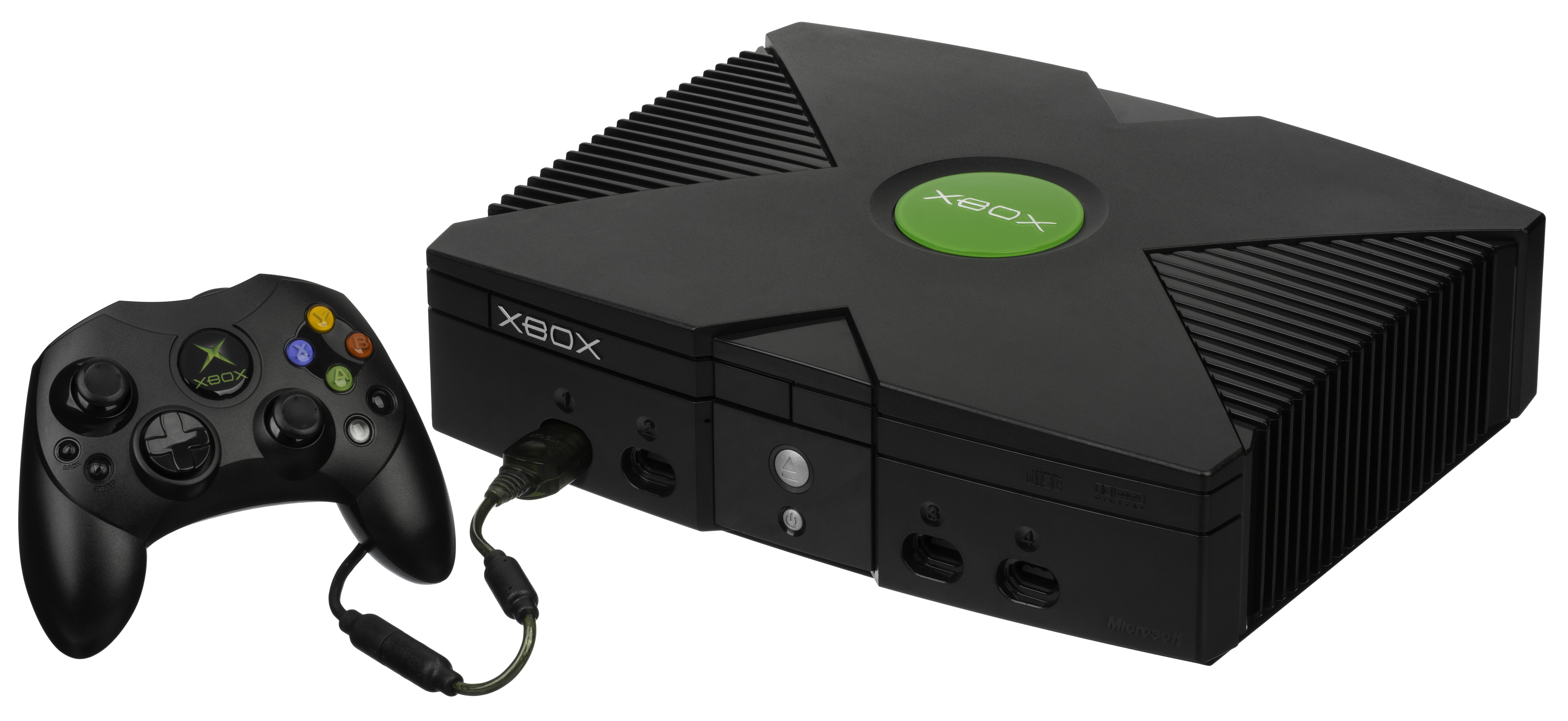
Jet Set Radio Future was released as an exclusive title on the Xbox (pictured) in 2002.

In 2001, Sega left the console market and began developing and publishing games for other platforms, including Microsoft's Xbox. During Tokyo Game Show 2001, Microsoft and Sega announced plans to bring Sega games to the Xbox. Both corporations announced an 11-game publishing alliance to premiere many of Sega's upcoming games on the platform. Chief Xbox officer Robbie Bach stated that "having Sega on board with Xbox is a huge win for gamers around the world". Bach also stated that "the creative artists at Sega not only are going to deliver great Xbox games, they will help us establish the benchmark for great Xbox gaming experiences both on and offline". Sega of America president and CEO Peter Moore said that "We believe that Microsoft will be very successful with Xbox, which is why we have such a close, strategic relationship with them. Our world-renowned development studios have been very impressed with the Xbox hardware, and they are excited to bring new gaming experiences to consumers by utilizing the platform's power and network capabilities. We share Microsoft's commitment to broadband online gaming and will work with it to deliver the best content possible to gamers".

The development schedule was one year and one month. It was difficult to release it in time for the launch of the Xbox in Japan, as well releasing it worldwide soon after. In an interview with Sega product manager Rich Briggs, Briggs described the target audience as Xbox players interested in action-adventure games, emphasizing narrative progression and player expression through skating and graffiti as key elements of gameplay. Kawagoe also confirmed that the game was planned for release shortly after the Xbox launch, positioning it as an early post-launch game rather than a day-one release.

Briggs stated that the series’ cel-shaded visual style was adopted to give the game a distinctive appearance uncommon in contemporary game, and was retained in Jet Set Radio Future as a natural evolution of the original game’s art direction. In preview coverage published by Dreamcast Magazine (Dorimaga), developers described the game’s use of what they referred to as “toon rendering,” a real-time CG technique intended to blend anime-style character design with three-dimensional environments. The article highlighted this approach as central to preserving the series’ illustrated look while allowing characters and stages to be rendered as fully polygonal models, presenting the visual style as a hybrid of hand-drawn aesthetics and contemporary 3D graphics technology.

Jet Set Radio Future was first publicly shown during E3 2001 and the Tokyo Game Show. It was originally announced under the name Jet Grind Radio Future to stay consistent with the previous game release in North America due to trademark problems for "Jet Set" at the time. However, the game reverted back to its original name after the trademark problems were resolved. Jet Set Radio Future was released as an Xbox launch game in Japan and Europe, and a standalone game in North America. It was first released in Japan on February 22, 2002, followed by North America on February 26, and Europe on March 14. A deal was made between Sega and Microsoft in late 2002 to have Jet Set Radio Future along with Sega GT 2002 bundled with the Xbox on a dual-game DVD. This was designed to build the Xbox installed base and appeal to consumers during the holiday season.

== Soundtrack ==
The soundtrack contains 34 songs and is played in a premixed format consisting of certain playlists directed for each chapter, and for certain levels, although there is a jukebox.

Official promotional materials for Jet Set Radio Future emphasized the soundtrack’s broad range of musical genres, including hip-hop, techno, big beat, and rock.

The main theme of the game is called "The Concept of Love". Alongside returning video game composers from the first game, Hideki Naganuma, Richard Jacques, Deavid Soul, Toronto, and B.B. Rights, the soundtrack features artists such as indie rock band Guitar Vader, Ad-Rock (of Beastie Boys) side project BS 2000, hip hop/breakbeat group Scapegoat Wax, indie pop band Bis, The Latch Brothers (including Mike D of the Beastie Boys, Chris "Wag" Wagner and Kenny Tick Salcido), rock band Cibo Matto, musical collective Bran Van 3000, and hip hop group The Prunes.

In October 2001, Sega officially announced that The Latch Brothers not only contributed music to the game but also held discussions and analyzed the game in order to create music that matched its world and atmosphere. In addition to the original tracks, remixed songs by other artists affiliated with Grand Royal were also produced specifically for the game.

A soundtrack CD, Jet Set Radio Future Music Sampler, was given to people who pre-ordered the game in the United States, featuring 11 tracks from the game. It was published by Wave Master and distributed by Grand Royal. The CD album, Jet Set Radio Future Original Sound Tracks, was released by Scitron Discs on March 20, 2002, featuring 22 tracks from the game and was distributed by Sony Music Distribution (Japan) Inc. For the HD release of the original Jet Set Radio, a new CD album, Jet Set Radio: Original Soundtrack with Bonus Tracks from JSRF, was distributed by Sumthing Else on September 18, 2012, for North America and Europe, containing 17 tracks, including seven from Jet Set Radio Future. The latest album, Jet Set Radio Future SEGA Original Tracks, was released digitally by Sega with 20 tracks. It was released on iTunes and streaming services on October 3, 2012, alongside Jet Set Radio SEGA Original Tracks, made for the original game's HD release.

== Reception ==
Reception

Aggregate scores
Aggregator	Score
GameRankings	86%
Metacritic	88/100

Review scores
Publication	Score
AllGame	4/5
Edge	8/10
Electronic Gaming Monthly	7.67/10
Eurogamer	6/10
Famitsu	8/10, 9/10, 7/10, 8/10
Game Informer	7/10
GamePro	5/5
GameRevolution	B+
GameSpot	8.7/10
GameSpy	4/5
GameZone	8.4/10
IGN	9.1/10
Official Xbox Magazine (US)	9.2/10
Official Xbox Magazine (UK)	8.9/10
Entertainment Weekly	B−
Maxim	8/10
MAN!AC	90%
Power Unlimited	82%
Consoles+	95%
ConsolesMicro	17/20
Hyper	88%
GMR	8/10

Awards
Publication	Award
National Academy of Video Game Trade Reviewers (NAVGTR)	Outstanding Original Sports Game
GameSpot	Best Platformer; Best Music; Best Graphics (Artistic)
IGN	Editor's Choice Award

Jet Set Radio Future received critical acclaim upon release, receiving "generally favorable" reviews, scoring 86% and 88/100, according to GameRankings and Metacritic. In Japan, Famitsu gave it a score of 32 out of 40.

The game was awarded "Outstanding Original Sports Game" and was nominated for "Outstanding Animation in a Game Engine", "Outstanding Art Direction in a Game Engine", and "Outstanding Original Musical Score" by the National Academy of Video Game Trade Reviewers. IGN awarded it "Editor's Choice", called it "one of the coolest titles around" but said that it also fails to reach classic status because it was "not enough of a challenge". GameSpot described it as "one of the better Xbox games to date" and disagreed with IGN, claiming the game "offered a serious challenge". The publication named it the second-best video game of February 2002, and it won the annual "Best Platformer", "Best Music" and "Best Graphics (Artistic)" awards among Xbox games. It received a nomination for the Xbox "Game of the Year" prize, but lost to MechAssault. Despite positive reviews, this was not followed by high sales. It was nominated for GameSpot's "Best Game No One Played on Xbox" award, and named the most unfairly ignored game in the OXM UK Awards the year of its release. During the 6th Annual Interactive Achievement Awards, the Academy of Interactive Arts & Sciences nominated Jet Set Radio Future for "Console Action/Adventure Game of the Year".

In 2009, Edge ranked the game at #44 on its list of "The 100 Best Games To Play Today", writing: "The sound track is peerless, and whether grinding vertically down a 200-foot dragon, leaping across Shibuya's handrails, or just cruising the wrong way down a one-way street, there's nowhere else that's so exhilarating to simply travel through." The game was also featured in 1001 Video Games You Must Play Before You Die. French magazine Consoles Max also reviewed the game positively, praising its visual style, sense of movement, and soundtrack, while noting that its dense structure and mission design could become repetitive over longer play sessions, awarding it a score of 15 out of 20.

In a preview published in the U.S. edition of Play magazine, the game was described as emphasizing increased trick complexity and speed, with reviewers highlighting more powerful grinds, extended combo chains, and visually dense environments. The preview characterized the presentation as particularly striking in motion, citing the combination of particle effects, camera movement, and large-scale cityscapes as central to the game’s appeal.

Additional preview coverage in Official Xbox Magazine noted that Jet Set Radio Future was adjusted to be more approachable than its predecessor, citing changes to graffiti tagging and movement that reduced precision demands while maintaining speed and flow. The preview also emphasized the increased scale and interactivity of the city environments, describing the game as visually dense and particularly striking in motion, while highlighting the return of composer Hideki Naganuma as a key factor in preserving the series’ identity.

=== Sales ===
Jet Set Radio Future sold 80,000 copies in the United States in its first six months. It sold a total of 28,433 copies in Japan.

To commemorate the game’s release, Sega hosted a series of club events in Tokyo beginning on February 22, 2002. The events featured playable demo stations, large-scale VJ visuals synchronized to music, and appearances by DJs wearing masks inspired by in-game characters such as Poison Jam. Merchandise produced through a collaboration with the New York fashion brand Schott NYC was also sold at the venues.

== Legacy ==
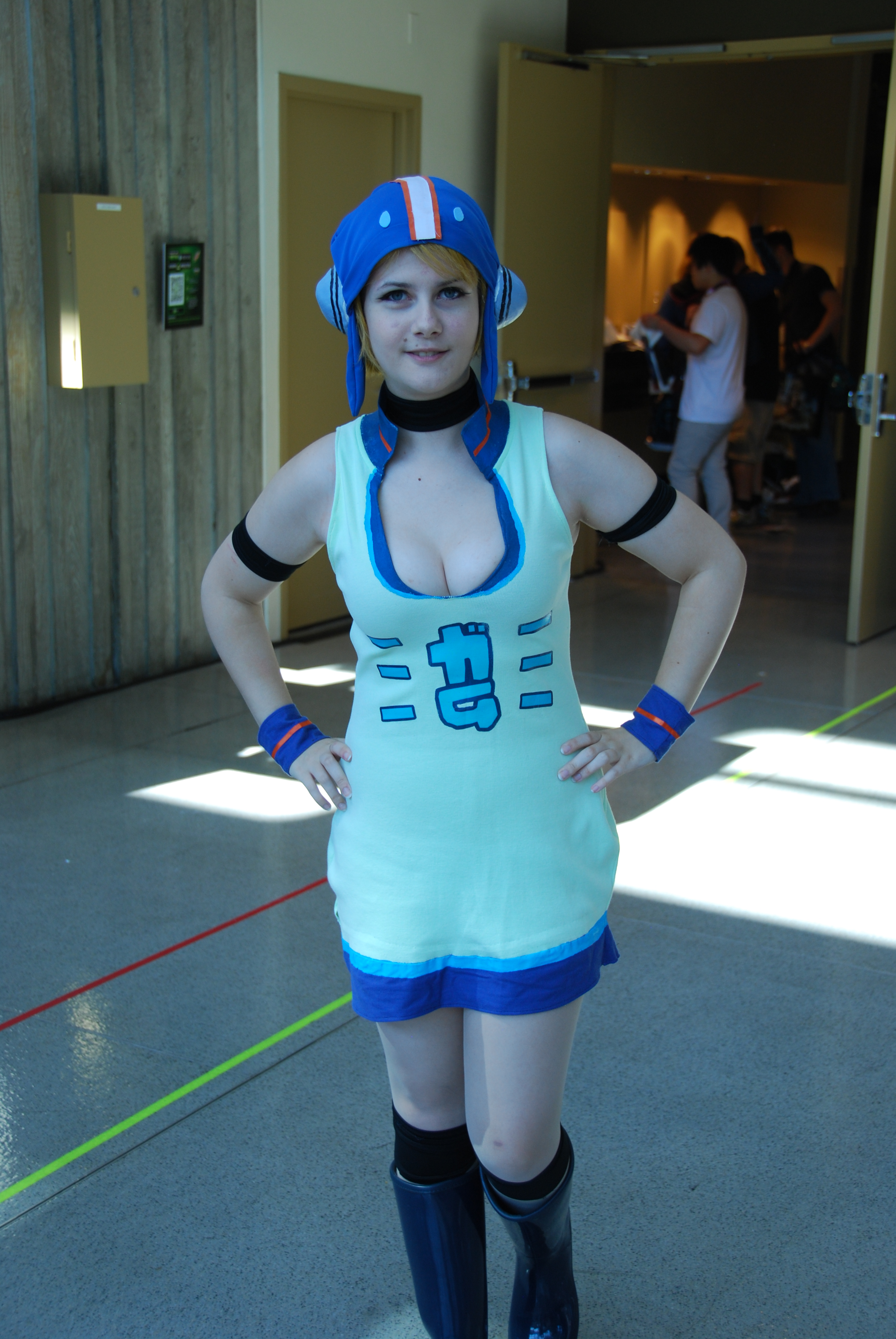
A cosplayer dressed as the character Gum, based on her design in Jet Set Radio Future

The game was highly regarded, but this did not translate into sales. Director Masayoshi Kikuchi concluded that they wanted to pursue profitability and popularity in Japan, which led to the Yakuza series, which he also worked on.

The character Beat and stages based on Shibuya Terminal, Rokkaku Dai Heights, 99th Street, and Highway Zero appear in the 2010 game Sonic & Sega All-Stars Racing. The Shibuya stage also appears in the 2012 game Sonic & All-Stars Racing Transformed.

In 2005, Jet Set Radio Future was made backwards compatible on the Xbox 360. Unlike Jet Set Radio and other Sega games for Xbox, Jet Set Radio Future has not been made backwards compatible on the Xbox One or the Xbox Series X/S. In a 2023 interview, Xbox Game Studios CEO Phil Spencer confirmed that an unsuccessful attempt was made to add the game to Xbox's backwards compatibility program, stating: "One of the games I'd always wanted to get, we weren't able to land it in our backward compatibility program, was Jet Set Radio Future." ComicBook.com has speculated that this may be due to problems with licensing the soundtrack, among other reasons.

Jet Set Radio Future was featured in the 2002 music video to "Hella Good" by American rock band No Doubt, where it depicts them playing the game. The game developed the status of being a cult classic and its fandom would attempt to work on a decompilation.

=== Sequel ===
Kuju Entertainment presented Sega with a concept for a new Jet Set Radio game for the Nintendo Wii, but Sega was not interested in developing new games in the series. In 2017, Dinosaur Games created a proof of concept, Jet Set Radio Evolution, after Sony expressed interest in their work at GDC 2017. Sega declined the project.

In mid-2020, the Jet Set Radio lead designer, Kazuki Hosokawa, told USGamer that he and his team were "too old and experienced" to create a new Jet Set Radio game with the "same energy" as the original. In 2021, it was reported that the art director, Ryuta Ueda, had rejoined Sega. During the Game Awards 2023, a new title was announced, alongside reboots of several Sega franchises including Crazy Taxi, Golden Axe, Shinobi, and Streets of Rage.
