= Lethal League =

2014 video game

- Developer: Team Reptile
- Publisher: Team Reptile
- Platforms: Microsoft Windows, OS X, Linux, PlayStation 4, Xbox One, Nintendo Switch
- Release: Microsoft Windows, OS X, Linux: WW: 27 August 2014; PlayStation 4: WW: 9 May 2017; Xbox One: WW: 10 May 2017
- Genre: Fighting
- Modes: Single-player, multiplayer

Lethal League is an indie fighting video game developed by Dutch developer Team Reptile. It was released worldwide on Windows on 27 August 2014, with PlayStation 4 and Xbox One versions released in May 2017. A sequel, Lethal League Blaze, was released on Windows in October 2018, and on PlayStation 4, Xbox One and Nintendo Switch in July 2019.

== Gameplay ==
Lethal League is a 2D arena fighting video game in which up to four players face off against each other in an arena. The goal is to hit a ball back and forth, and have the ball hit other players until there is only one player left. With each consecutive hit, the ball will speed up more, making it harder for the other players to not get hit and hit the ball back. In their review, Destructoid described the game as "If Mario Tennis and Smash Bros. had a baby, and it was raised by European DJs who love baseball."

== Development ==
Lethal League started out as a flash game, the idea coming from the developers playing around with a 'hit and reflect projectile mechanic' in Team Reptile's first game, Megabyte Punch. The flash game was picked up by several media outlets and was the Mystery Game at the UFGT9 fighting game tournament. After being very well received, the developer decided to flesh out the prototype and develop it into a full game to be released on Steam. The more fleshed out version of Lethal League was first showcased at the 2014 Casual Connect Europe, and later at EVO's indie showcase and Gamescom, where the game was a crowd favorite.

In 2016, the game was part of the Humble Indie Bundle 17 with ports to Mac OS X and Linux.

In 2017, Team Reptile announced a remake of Lethal League, titled Lethal League Blaze, that included fully 3D models and animations. It was released for Windows on October 24, 2018, followed by versions for PlayStation 4, Xbox One, and Nintendo Switch on July 12, 2019.

== Reception ==
Reception

Aggregate score
| Aggregator | Score |
|---|---|
| Metacritic | 82/100 (PC); 66/100 (PS4) |

Review scores
| Publication | Score |
|---|---|
| Destructoid | 9/10 (PC); 4.5/10 (PS4) |
| Hardcore Gamer | 3/5 |
| Shacknews | 8/10 |

Lethal League was released on 27 August 2014 and has received mostly positive reviews. Many reviewers praised Lethal League for being "easy to learn, spectacular to watch and complex to master" and for being a lot of fun to play on the couch with friends. Destructoid's Ben Pack ended his review saying "It's my personal favorite of the revival of couch co-op games, and may be my favorite "tell a friend" game of all time." The game sold over 100.000 units worldwide by April 2015.

== Sequel ==
Reception

Aggregate score
| Aggregator | Score |
|---|---|
| Metacritic | 82/100 (NS) |

Review scores
| Publication | Score |
|---|---|
| Nintendo Life | 80 |
| Nintendo World Report | 85 |
| PlayStation Official Magazine – UK | 90 |

Lethal League Blaze released on 24 October 2018 to similar reception.

== See also ==
- Bomb Rush Cyberfunk, another game developed by Team Reptile.
