= Memory card =

Electronic data storage device

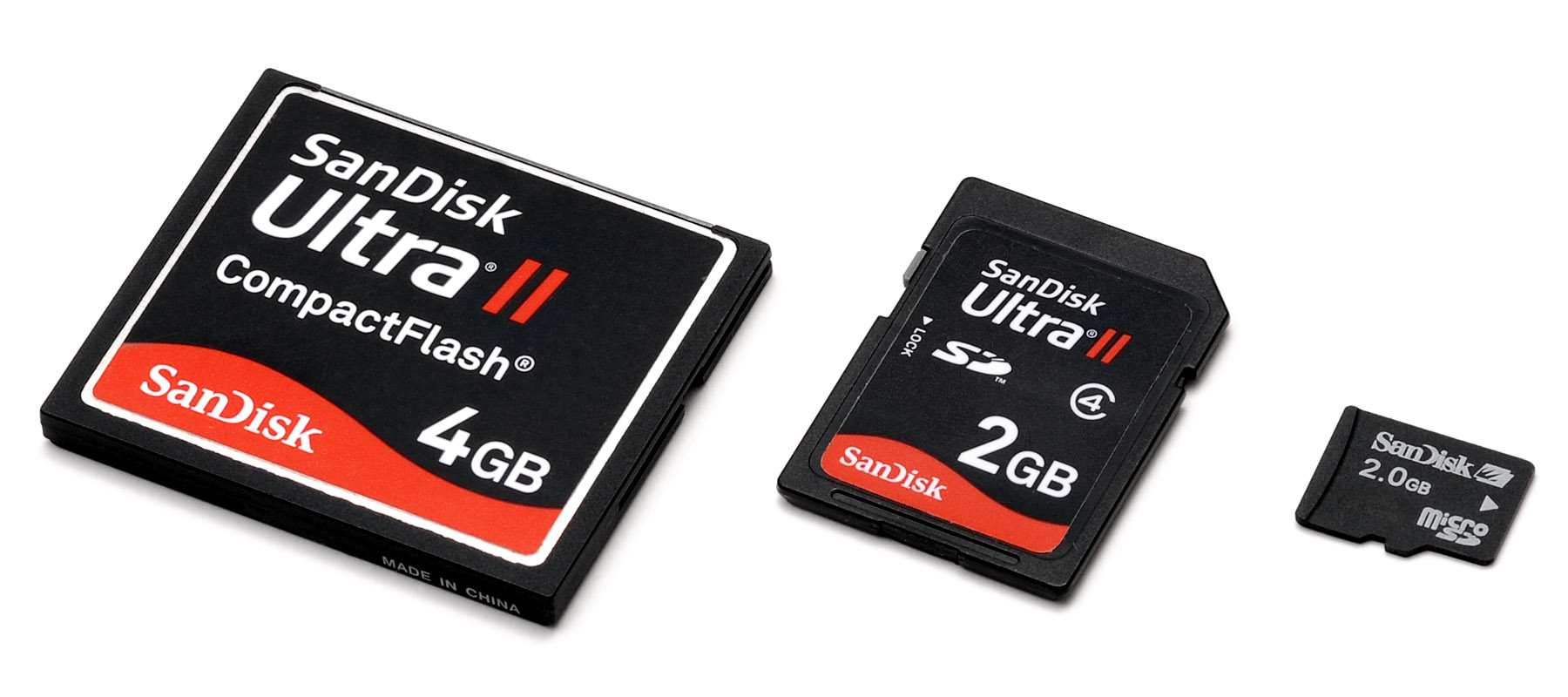
Miniaturization is evident in memory card creation; over time, the physical card sizes have become smaller.

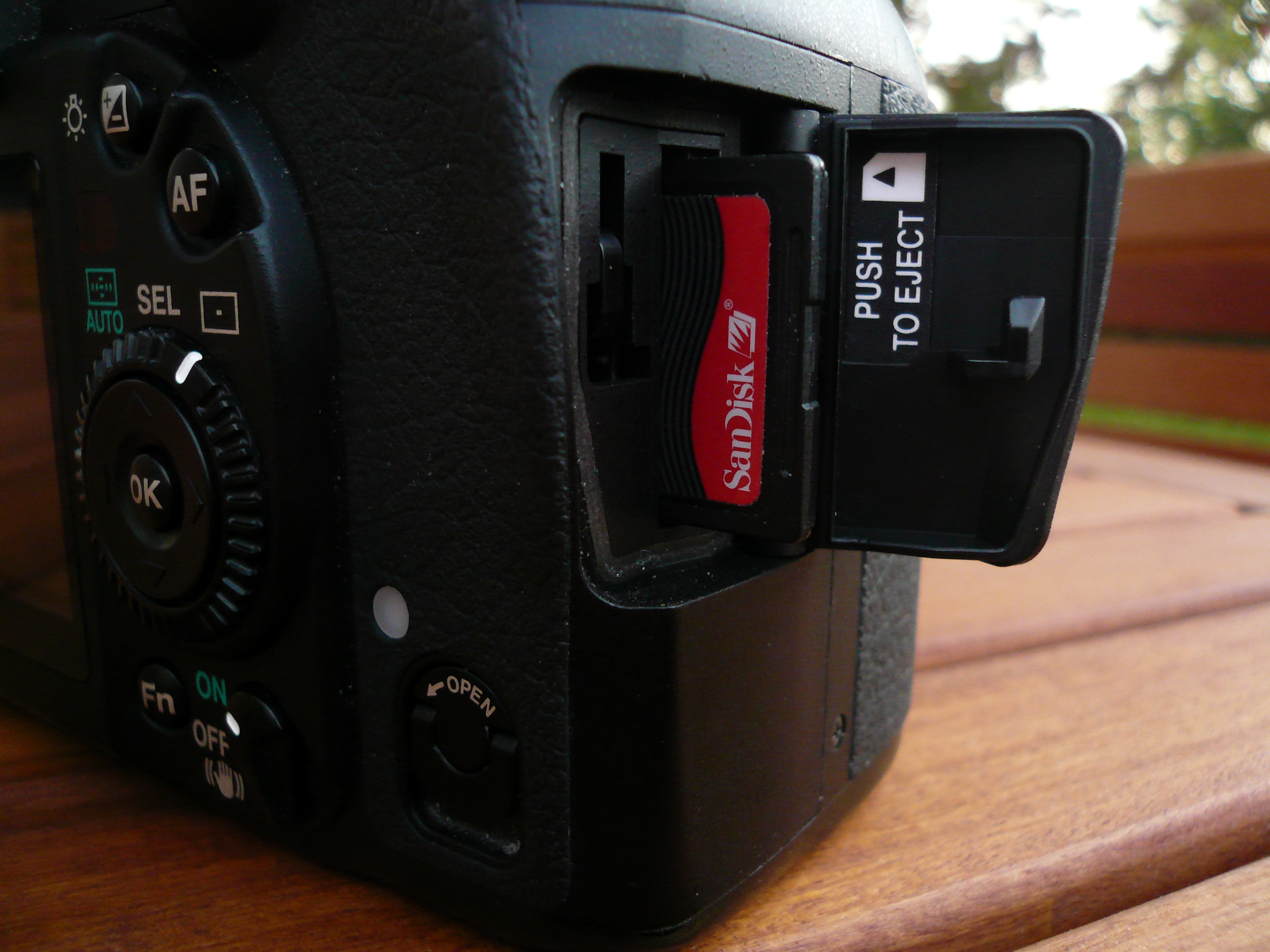
Memory card in a digital SLR camera by Pentax

A memory card is an electronic data storage device used for storing digital information, typically using flash memory. These are commonly used in digital portable electronic devices, such as digital cameras as well as in many early games consoles such as the Neo Geo. They allow adding memory to such devices using a card in a socket instead of protruding USB flash drives. Memory cards are also widely used in action cameras, drones, e-readers, handheld game consoles, dashcams, and some smartphones, though many modern phones have phased out expandable storage in favor of internal storage.

Common types of flash memory card include SD cards (including microSD), Sony's Memory Stick and CompactFlash. As of 2024, SD cards are the most common type of memory cards.

== History ==
The basis for memory card technology is flash memory. It was invented by Fujio Masuoka at Toshiba in 1980 and commercialized by Toshiba in 1987.

The development of memory cards was driven in the 1980s by the need for an alternative to floppy disk drives that had lower power consumption, had less weight and occupied less volume in laptops. Some were also marketed as a lower cost alternative to ROM cartridges. Several competing and incompatible memory card formats were developed by several vendors, such as for example the Bee Card, Astron SoftCard, Sega Cards, NEC UltraLite memory cards, and the Mitsubishi Melcard which came in variants using 60 and 50 connector pins. The Sega Card was developed as a cheaper alternative to game cartridges. Some memory cards were used for memory expansion in laptops.

JEIDA, the Japan Electronic Industry Development Association, began to work on a standard for memory cards in 1985, and developed the JEIDA memory card in 1986. The Personal Computer Memory Card International Association (PCMCIA) was an industry association created in 1989 to promote a standard for memory cards in PCs, and worked closely with JEIDA, adopting their 68 pin connector design. The specification for PCMCIA type I cards, later renamed PC Cards, was first released in 1990, and unified the JEIDA memory card standard with the PC Card standard. This format later included support for other devices besides memory cards. PC Card was among the first commercial memory card formats to come out, but is mainly used in industrial applications and to connect I/O devices such as modems.

Some early memory cards used SRAM as a storage medium, which required a lithium battery to keep the contents in the SRAM. These cards were faster than their flash counterparts. Some of the first PCMCIA cards had capacities of 1 to 5 MB and cost US$100 per MB. Other early cards such as the Bee Card contained non-modifiable ROM, Write once read many EPROM or rewriteable EEPROM memory. In 1992, SanDisk introduced FlashDisk, a PCMCIA card and one of the first memory cards that did not require battery power to retain its contents, as it used flash memory.

In 1994, memory card formats smaller than the PC Card arrived. The first one was CompactFlash and later SmartMedia and Miniature Card. The desire for smaller cards for cell-phones, PDAs, and compact digital cameras drove a trend that left the previous generation of "compact" cards looking big. In 2000 the SD card was announced. SD was envisioned as a single memory card format for several kinds of electronic devices, that could also function as an expansion slot for adding new capabilities for a device. In 2001, SmartMedia alone captured 50% of the digital camera market and CF had captured the professional digital camera market.

However, by 2005, SD and similar MMC cards had nearly taken over SmartMedia's spot, though still competing with Memory Stick variants, as well as CompactFlash. In industrial and embedded fields, even the PC card (PCMCIA) memory cards still manage to maintain a niche, while in mobile phones and PDAs, the memory card has become smaller.

Initially memory cards were expensive, costing US$3 per megabyte of capacity in 2001; this led to the development of miniaturized rotating disk memory devices such as the Microdrive, PocketZip and Dataplay. The Microdrive had higher capacities than memory cards at the time. All three concepts became obsolete once flash memory prices became lower and their capacities became higher by 2006.

New products of Sony (previously only using Memory Stick) and Olympus (previously only using XD-Card) have been offered with an additional SD-Card slot beginning in 2010. Effectively, the format war has turned in SD-Card's favor.

By the late 2010s, newer high-speed formats such as CFexpress and Universal Flash Storage (UFS) emerged to meet the demands of 4K, 8K, and RAW video recording, as well as high-speed continuous photography. XQD cards, once positioned as a successor to CompactFlash, have largely been replaced by CFexpress Type B, which shares the same physical form factor but uses a faster PCIe interface.

== Data table of selected memory card formats ==
Name	Abbreviation	Form factor (mm)	DRM
PC Card	PCMCIA	85.6 × 54 × 3.3	No
CompactFlash I	CF-I	43 × 36 × 3.3	No
CompactFlash II	CF-II	43 × 36 × 5.5	No
CFexpress Type A	CFA	20 × 28 × 2.8	Unknown
CFexpress Type B	CFX	38.5 × 29.8 × 3.8	Unknown
CFexpress Type C	?	54 × 74 × 4.8	Unknown
SmartMedia	SM/ SMC	45 × 37 × 0.76	ID
Memory Stick	MS	50.0 × 21.5 × 2.8	MagicGate
Memory Stick Duo	MSD	31.0 × 20.0 × 1.6	MagicGate
Memory Stick Pro Duo	MSPD	31.0 × 20.0 × 1.6	MagicGate
Memory Stick Pro-HG Duo	MSPDX	31.0 × 20.0 × 1.6	MagicGate
Memory Stick Micro M2	M2	15.0 × 12.5 × 1.2	MagicGate
Miniature Card	?	37 × 45 × 3.5	No
Multimedia Card	MMC	32 × 24 × 1.5	No
Reduced Size Multimedia Card	RS-MMC	16 × 24 × 1.5	No
MMCmicro Card	MMCmicro	12 × 14 × 1.1	No
Nintendo Switch	NS	31 × 21 × 3	?
P2 card	P2	85.6 × 54 × 3.3	No
PS Vita	PSV	30 x 22 x 2	?
SD card	SD	32 × 24 × 2.1	CPRM
SxS	SxS	75 × 34 × 5	No
Universal Flash Storage	UFS	?	Unknown
microSD card	microSD	15 × 11 × 0.7	CPRM
xD-Picture Card	xD	20 × 25 × 1.7	No
Intelligent Stick	iStick	24 × 18 × 2.8	No
Serial Flash Module	SFM	45 × 15	No
μ card	μcard	32 × 24 × 1	Unknown
NT Card	NT NT+	44 × 24 × 2.5	No
XQD card	XQD	38.5 × 29.8 × 3.8	Unknown
Nano Memory card	NM Card	12.3 × 8.8 × 0.7	Unknown

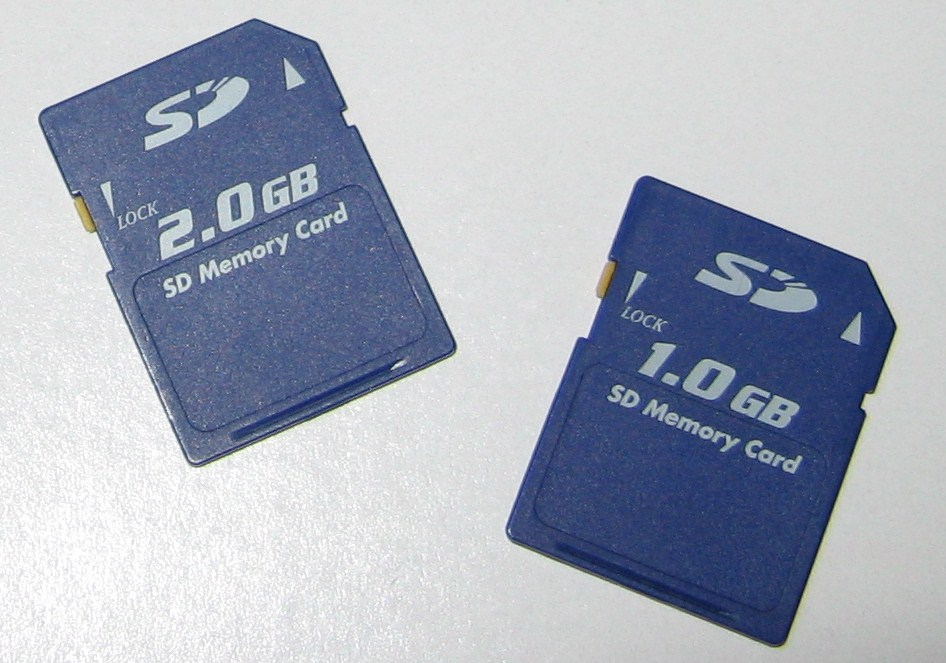
Secure Digital card (SD)

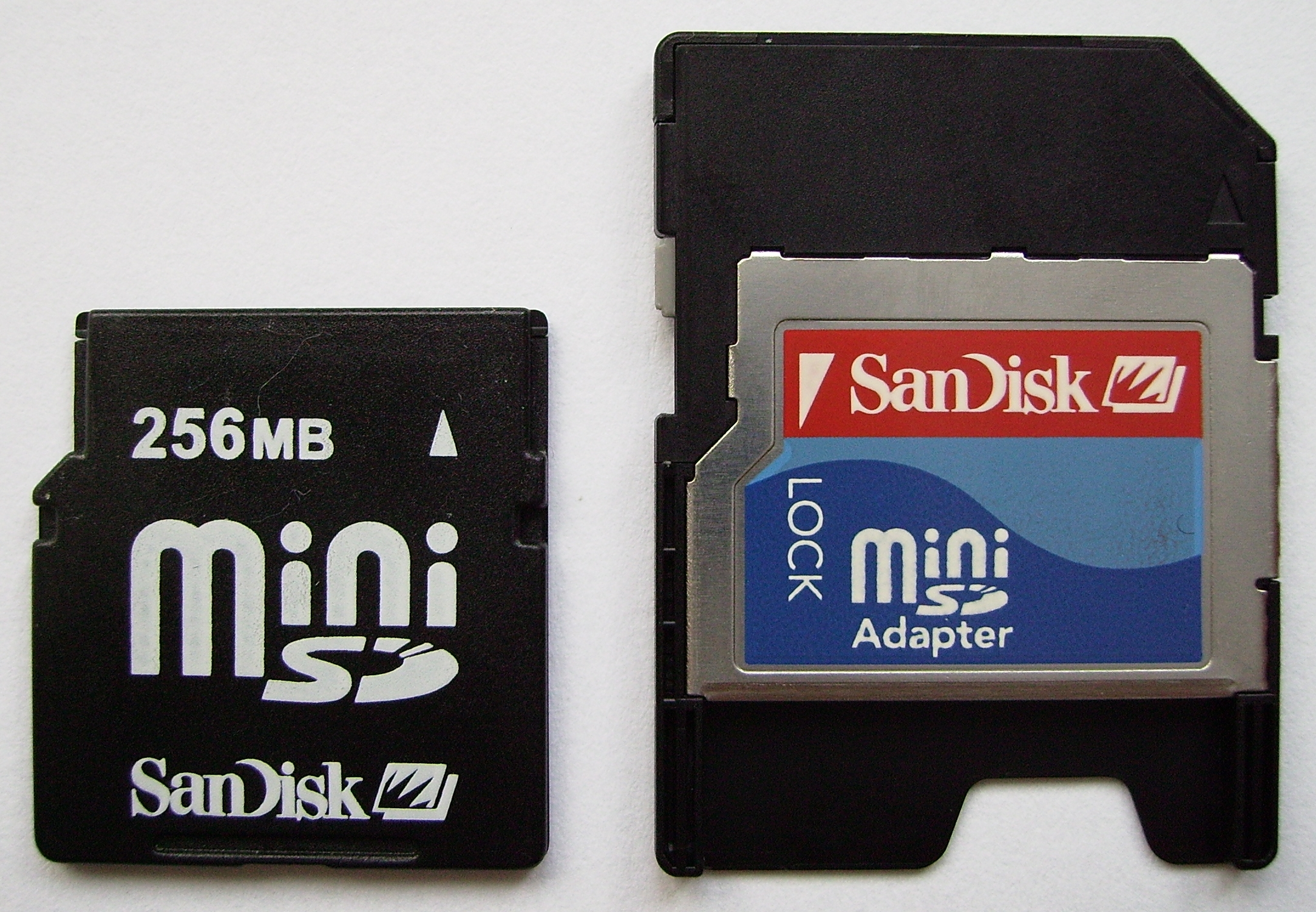
MiniSD card with an SD card adapter

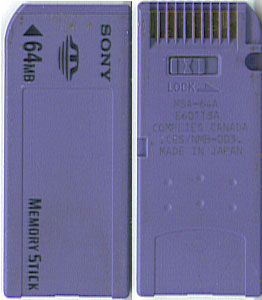
Memory Stick

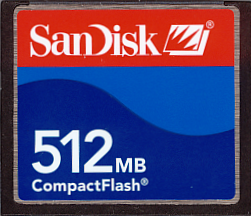
CompactFlash (CF-I)

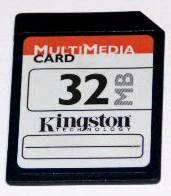
MultiMediaCard (MMC)

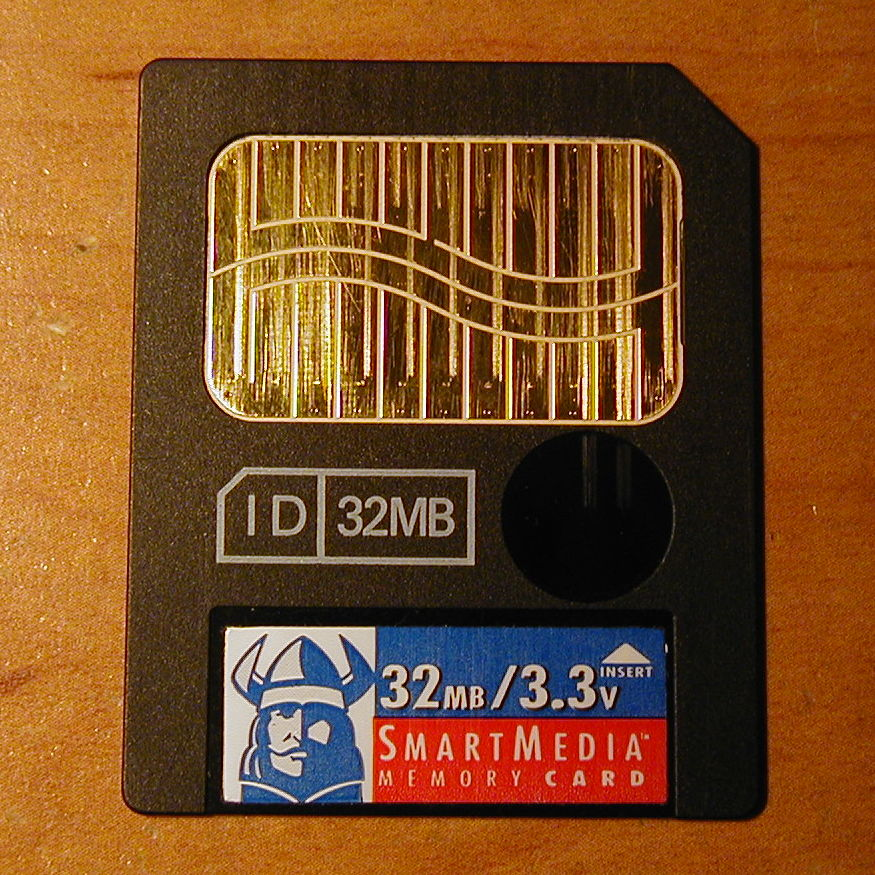
SmartMedia

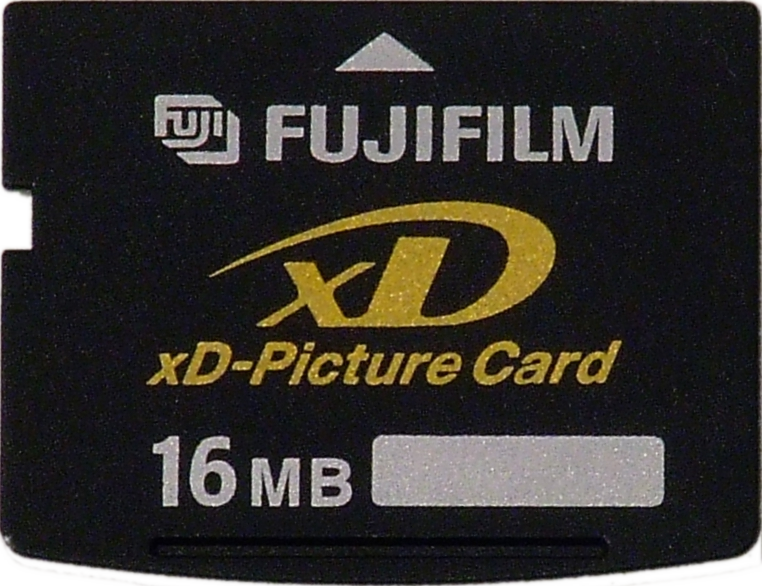
xD-Picture Card

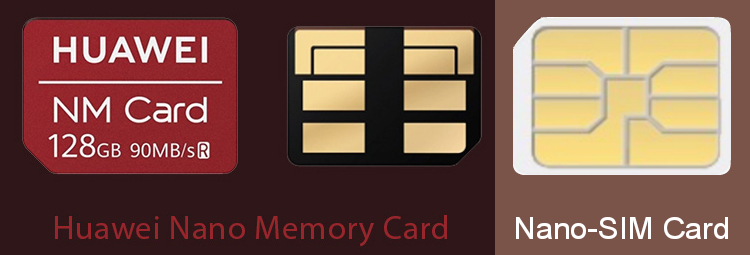
NM card (a proprietary memory card format created by Huawei) Electronic contacts compared to nano-sim card to the same scale

== Overview of all memory card types ==
- PCMCIA ATA Type I Card (PC Card ATA Type I)
  - PCMCIA Type II, Type III cards
- CompactFlash Card (Type I), CompactFlash High-Speed
- CompactFlash Type II, CF+(CF2.0), CF3.0
  - Microdrive
- CFexpress
- MiniCard (Miniature Card) (max 64 MB / 64 MiB)
- SmartMedia Card (SSFDC) (max 128 MB) (3.3 V,5 V)
- xD-Picture Card, xD-Picture Card Type M
- Memory Stick, MagicGate Memory Stick (max 128 MB); Memory Stick Select, MagicGate Memory Stick Select ("Select" means: 2x128 MB with A/B switch)
- SecureMMC
- Secure Digital (SD Card), Secure Digital High-Speed, Secure Digital Plus/Xtra/etc (SD with USB connector)
  - miniSD card
  - microSD card (aka Transflash, T-Flash, TF)
  - SDHC
  - WiFi SD Cards (SD Card With WiFi Card Built in) Powered by Device. (Eye-Fi, WiFi SD, Flash Air)
- Nano Memory (NM) card
- MU-Flash (Mu-Card) (Mu-Card Alliance of OMIA)
- C-Flash
- SIM card (Subscriber Identity Module)
- Smart card (ISO/IEC 7810, ISO/IEC 7816 card standards, etc.)
- UFC (USB FlashCard) (uses USB)
- FISH Universal Transportable Memory Card Standard (uses USB)
- Intelligent Stick (iStick, a USB-based flash memory card with MMS)
- SxS (S-by-S) memory card, a new memory card specification developed by Sandisk and Sony. SxS complies to the ExpressCard industry standard.
- Nexflash Winbond Serial Flash Module (SFM) cards, size range 1 MB, 2 MB and 4 MB.

=== Comparison ===
Standard	SD					UFS Card		CFast		XQD		CFexpress		
Version	3.0	4.0	6.0	7.0	8.0	1.0	2.0	1.0	2.0	1.0	2.0	1.0	2.0	4.0
Launched	2010 Q2	2011 Q1	2017 Q1	2018 Q2	2020 Q1	2016 Q2	?	2008 Q3	2012 Q3	2011 Q4	2014 Q1	2017 Q2	2019 Q1	2023 Q3
Bus	UHS-I	UHS-II	UHS-III	PCIe 3.0 x1	PCIe 4.0 x2	UFS 2.0	UFS 3.0	SATA-300	SATA-600	PCIe 2.0 x1	PCIe 2.0 x2	PCIe 3.0 x2	PCIe 3.0 x1/x2/x4	PCIe 4.0 x1/x2/x4
Speed (full-duplex)	104 MB/s	156 MB/s	624 MB/s	985 MB/s	3938 MB/s	530 MB/s	1200 MB/s	300 MB/s	600 MB/s	500 MB/s	1000 MB/s	1970 MB/s	up to 4 GB/s	up to 8 GB/s
NVMe				Yes	Yes		No				No	Yes	Yes	Yes
Size	2TB	2TB		128TB	128TB		1.152921504606846976EB				144.115PB			75.5578637ZB

=== Memory card adapter ===
A memory card adapter is a device that lets one type of memory card be used in a different slot or connected to a device that doesn't have the correct memory card reader. Memory card adapters can be divided into two categories:

- Passive adapters, mainly changing the physical connection and require little or no electronics. Examples:
  - microSD to SD adapter
  - Memory Stick Duo to Memory Stick Adapter
  - CompactFlash to IDE adapter (often largely passive because CompactFlash supports ATA-compatible operation)
- Active adapters, containing electronics that translate between different protocols or interfaces. Examples:
  - SD to ATA/ATAPI adapter
  - CF to Serial ATA adapter
  - SD to USB Memory card reader
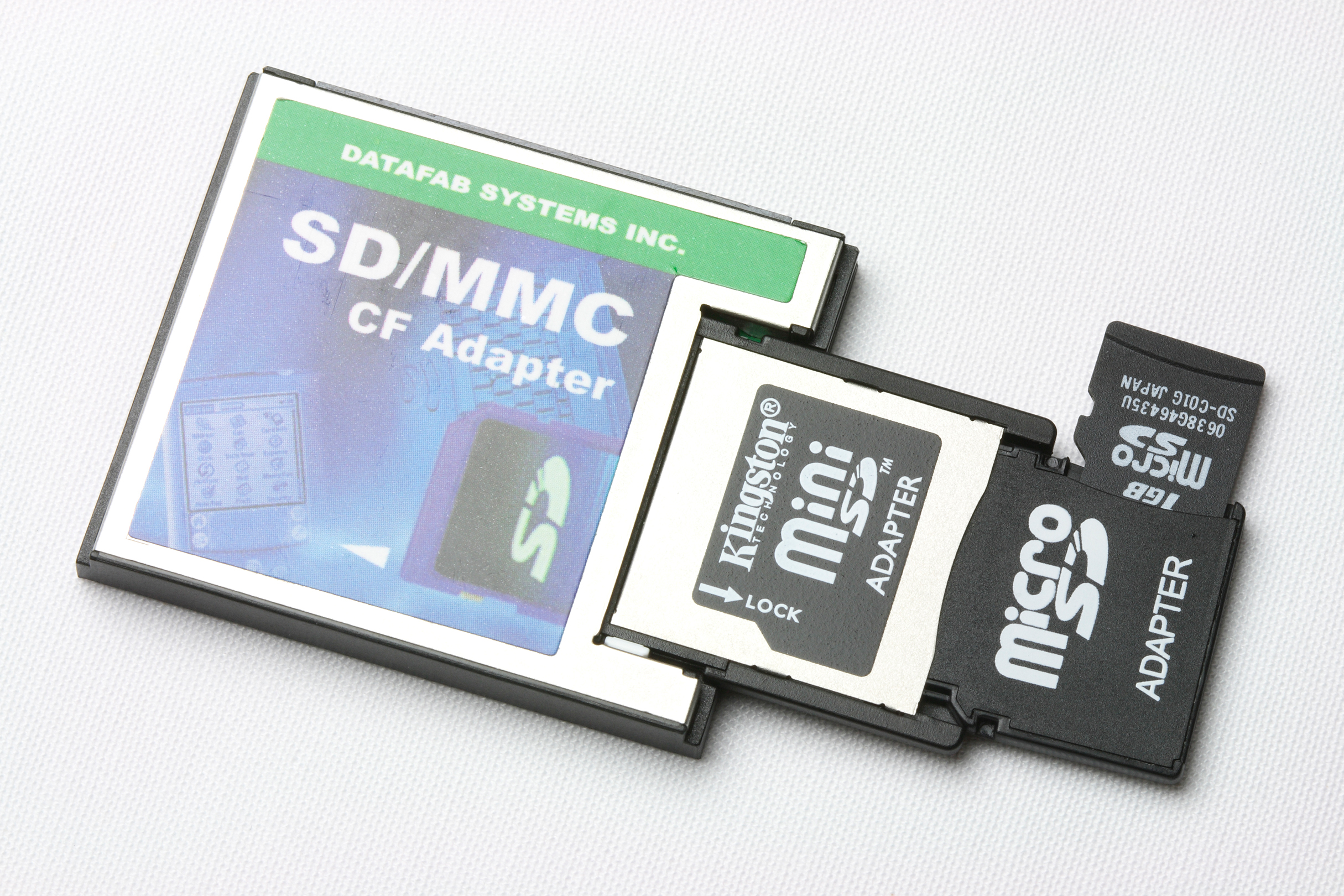
Chain of adapters:
microSD to mini SD to SD to CompactFlash

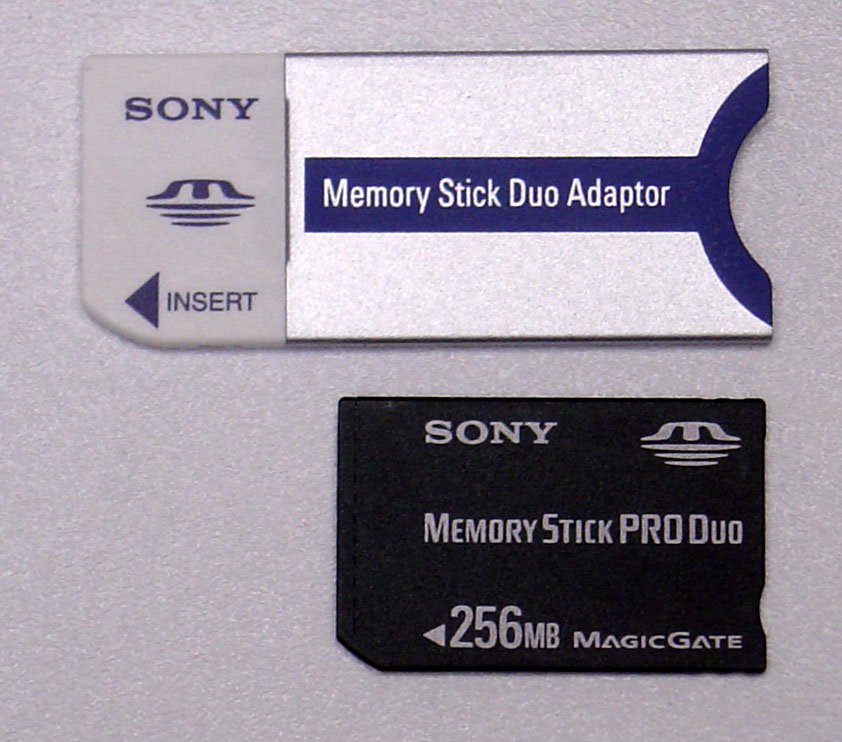
Memory Stick Duo to Memory Stick adapter

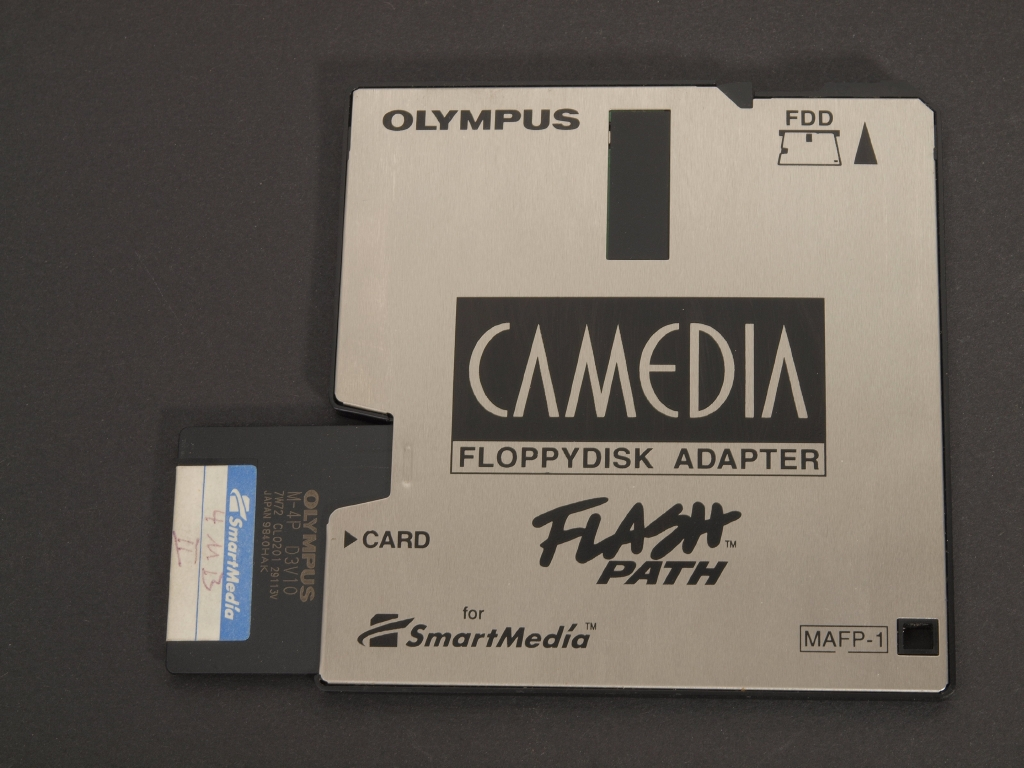
A FlashPath – Multi Media Card to Floppy Disk adapter

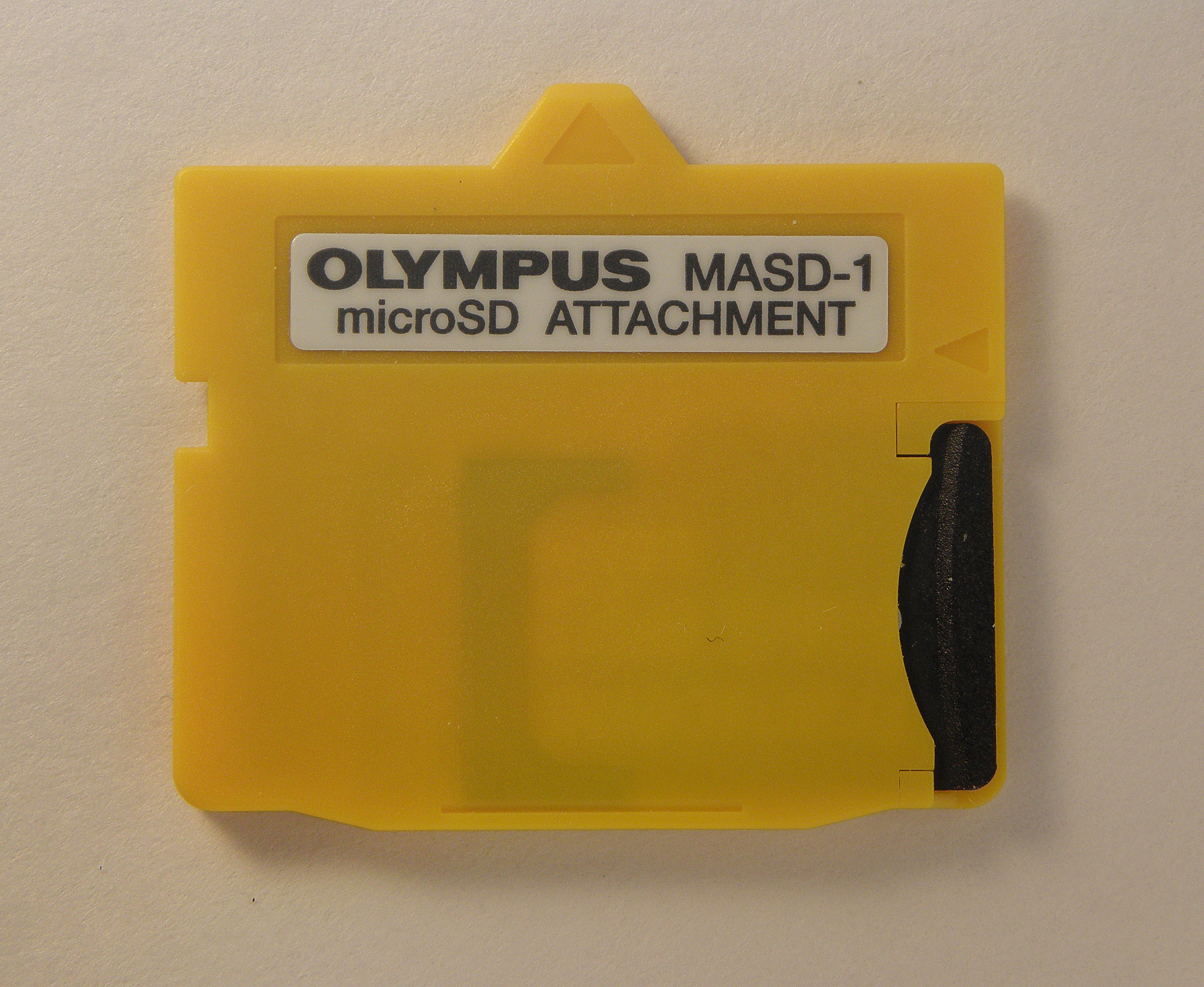
MicroSD to xD-Picture Card adapter

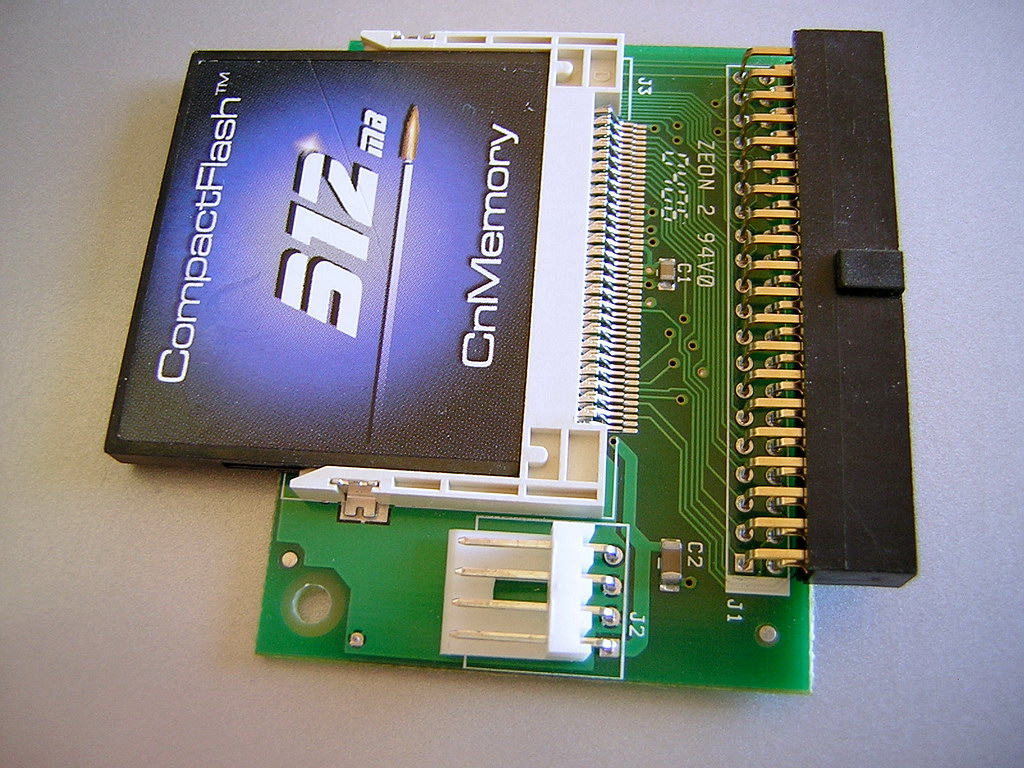
CompactFlash to ATA/ATAPI adapter

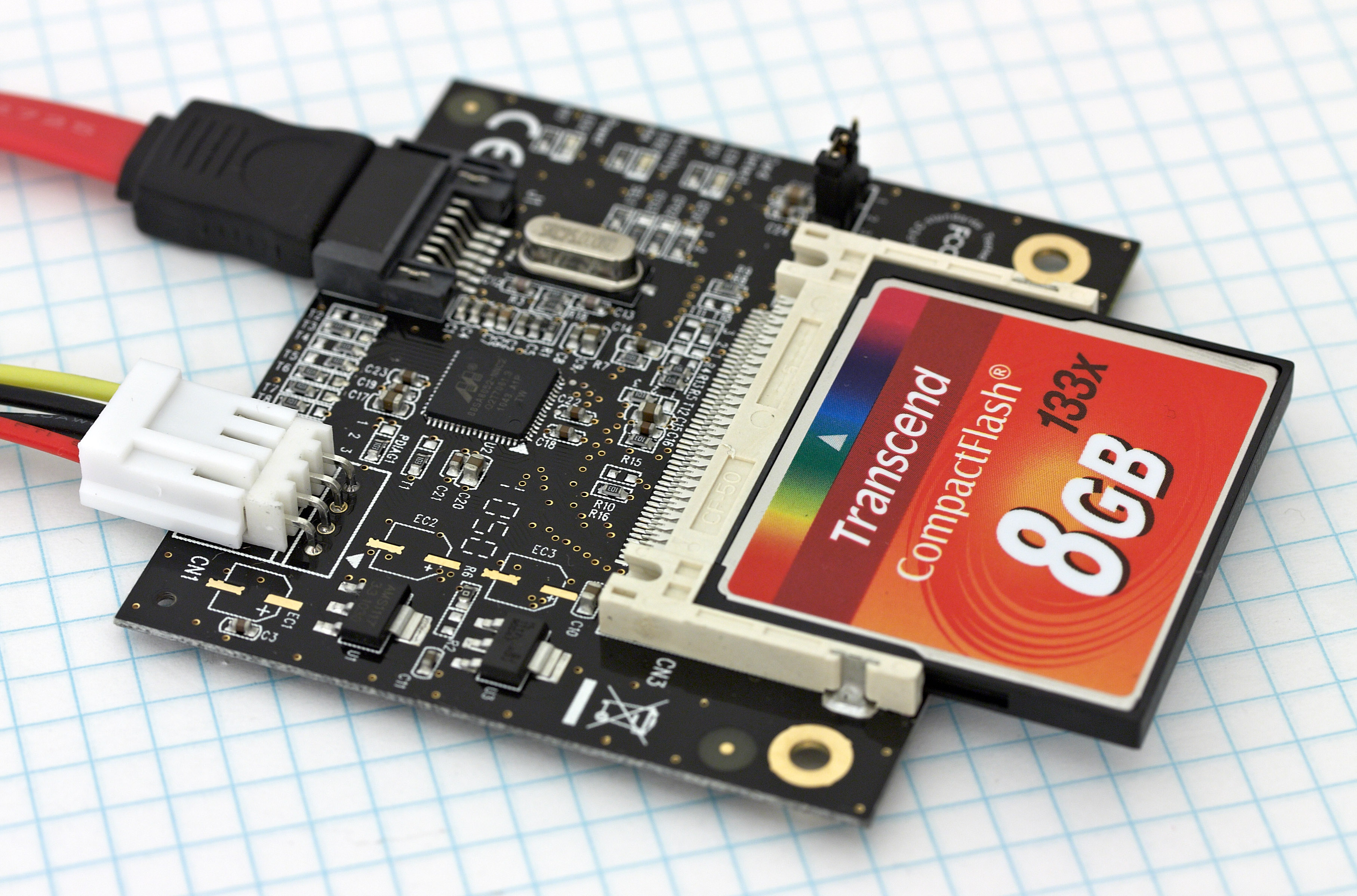
CompactFlash to Serial ATA adapter

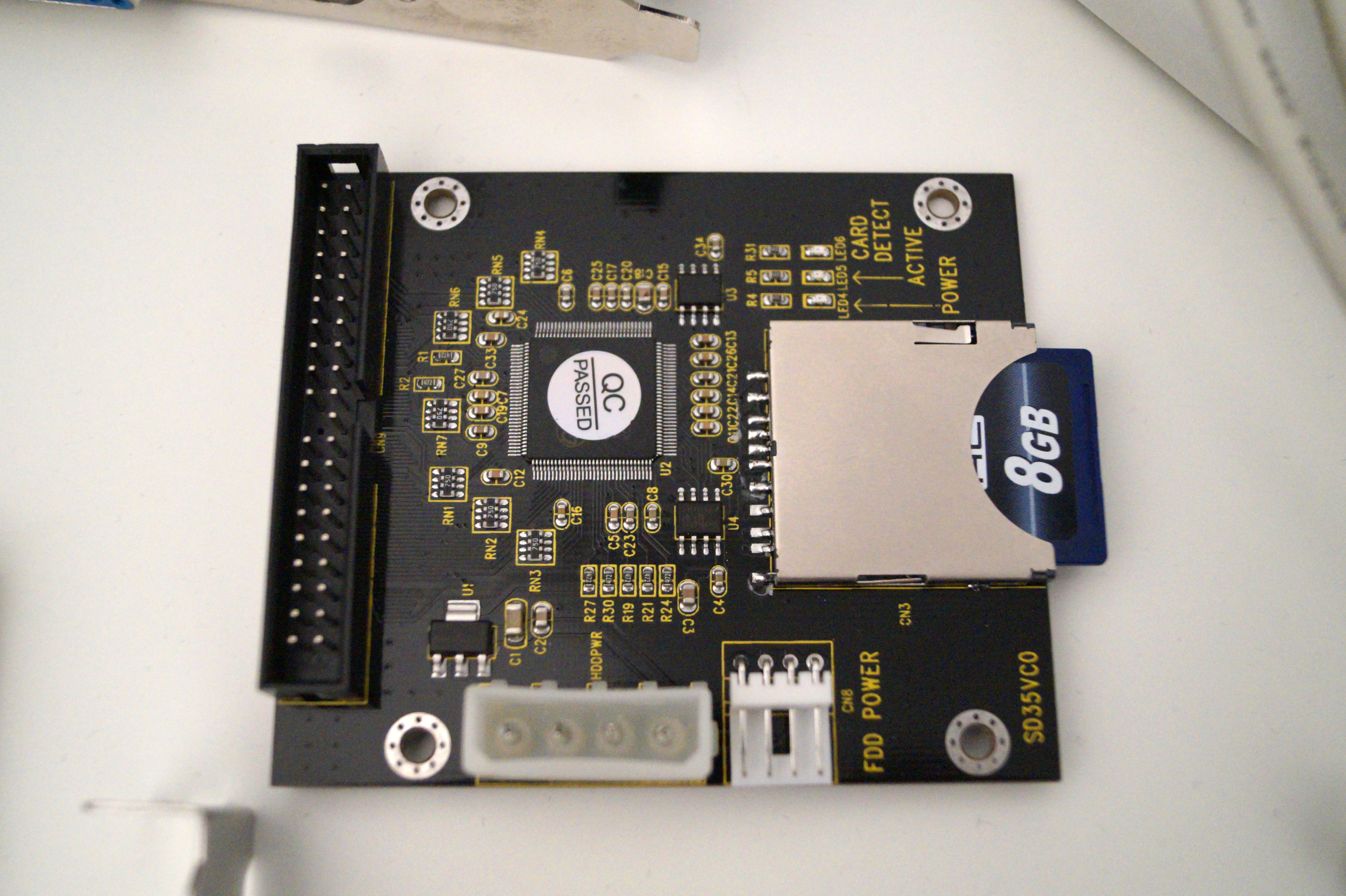
SD Card to ATA adapters

== Performance ==
SD memory cards carry speed-class markings that indicate minimum sequential write performance under conditions defined by the SD Association. These ratings are particularly relevant to video recording, which requires a sustained write speed to avoid dropped frames. Video Speed Class ratings include V6, V10, V30, V60, and V90.

== Video game consoles ==
Many older video game consoles used memory cards to hold saved game data. Cartridge-based systems primarily used battery-backed volatile RAM within each individual cartridge to hold saves for that game. Cartridges without this RAM may have used a password system, or would not save progress at all. The Neo Geo AES, released in 1990 by SNK, was the first video game console able to use a memory card. AES memory cards were also compatible with Neo Geo MVS arcade cabinets, allowing players to migrate saves between home and arcade systems and vice versa. Memory cards became commonplace when home consoles moved to read-only optical discs for storing the game program, beginning with systems such as the TurboGrafx-CD and Sega CD.

Until the sixth generation of video game consoles, memory cards were based on proprietary formats; Later systems used established industry formats for memory cards, such as FAT32.

Home consoles commonly use hard disk drive storage for saved games and allow the use of USB flash drives or other card formats via a memory card reader to transport game saves and other game information. Though some consoles have implemented cloud storage saving, most portable gaming systems still rely on custom memory cartridges to store program data, due to their low power consumption, smaller physical size and reduced mechanical complexity.

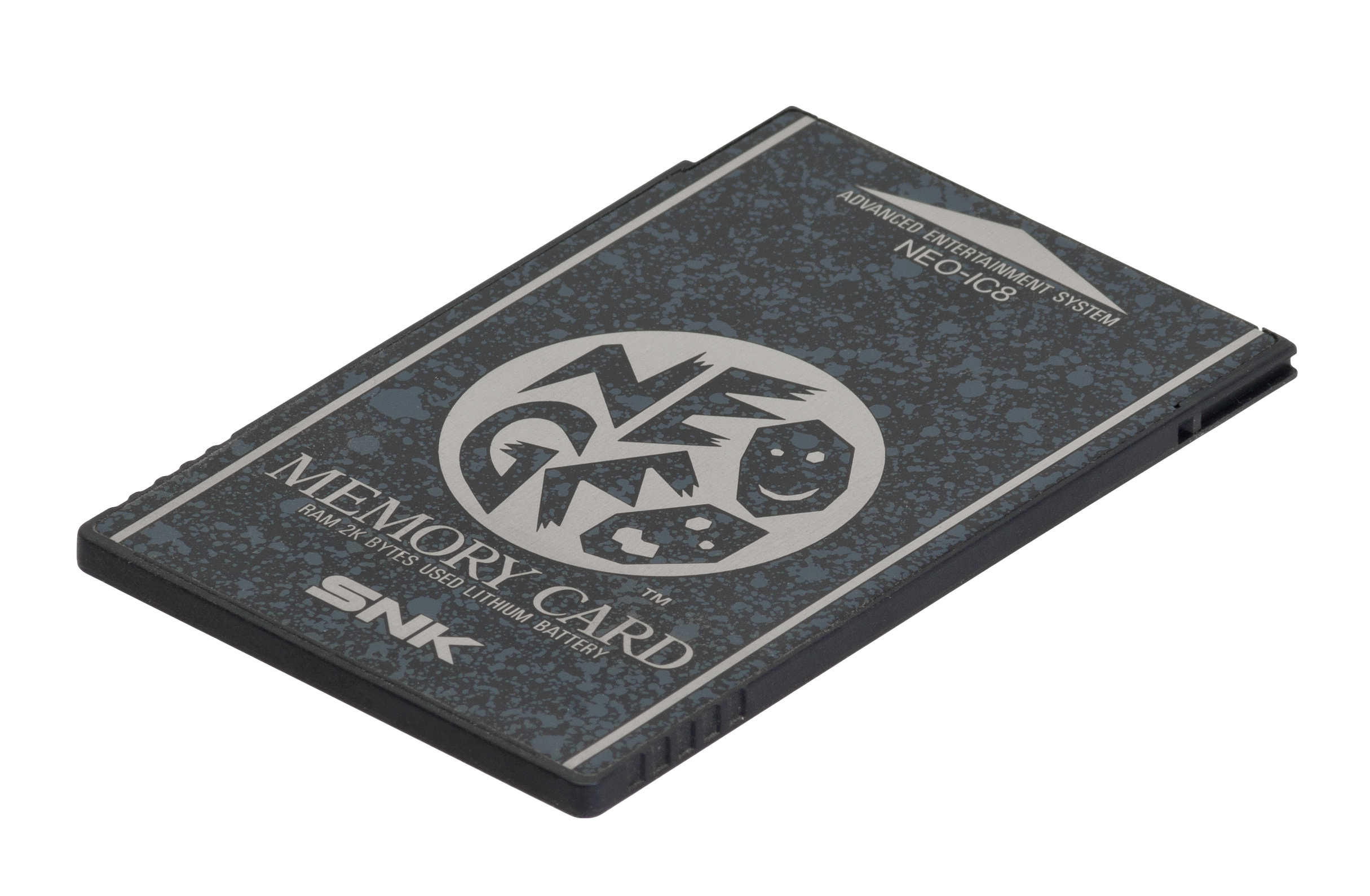
Neo Geo 2 KiB memory card

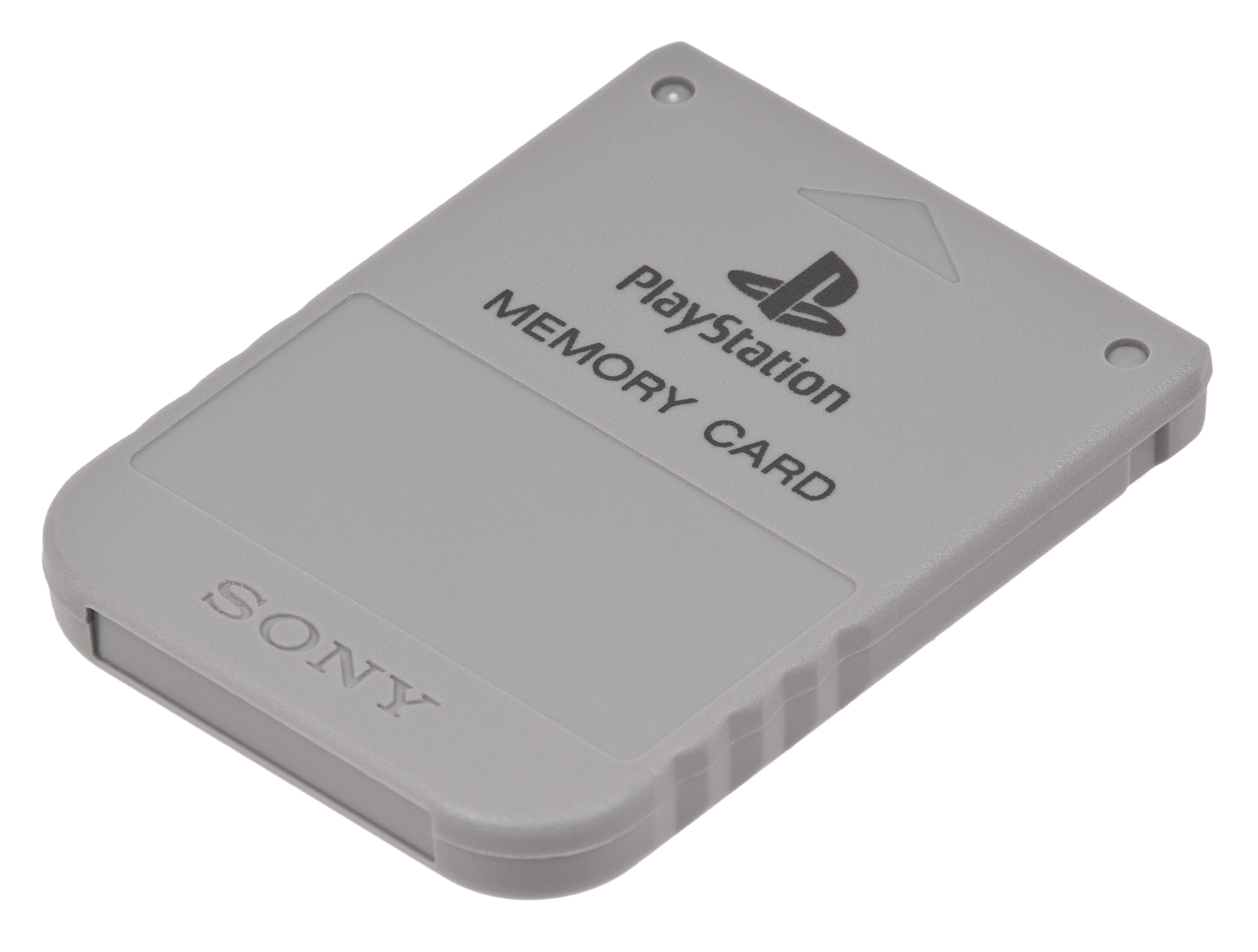
PlayStation 128 KiB memory card

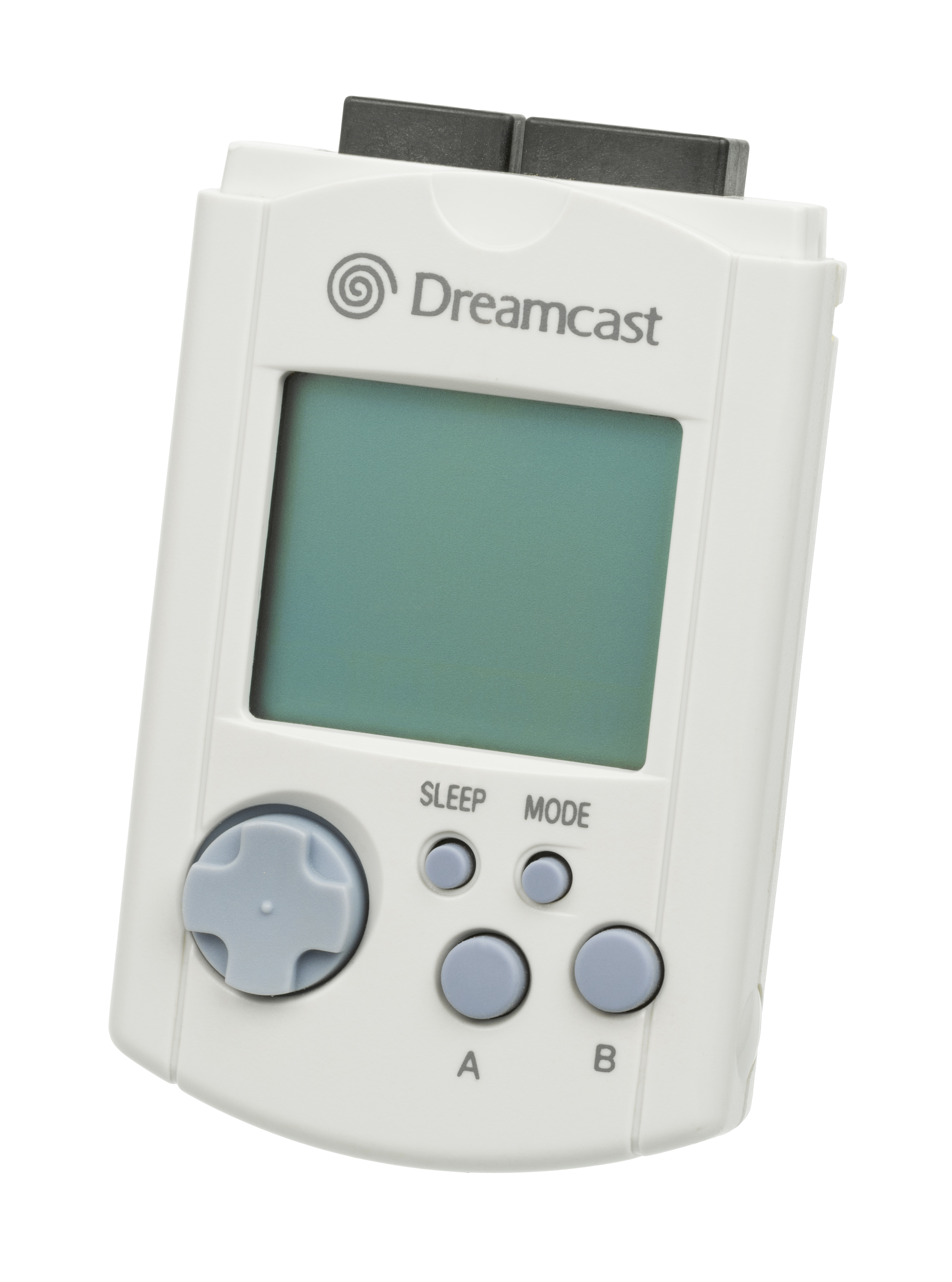
Dreamcast (VMU) 128 KiB memory card

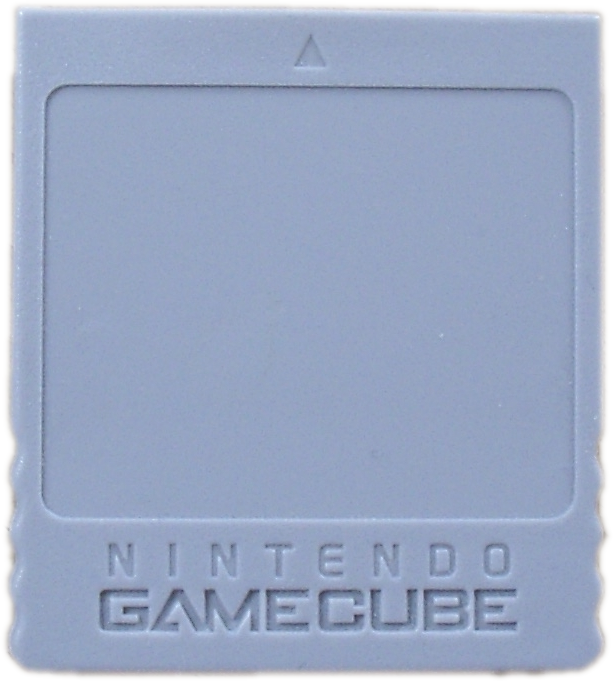
GameCube 512 KiB memory card

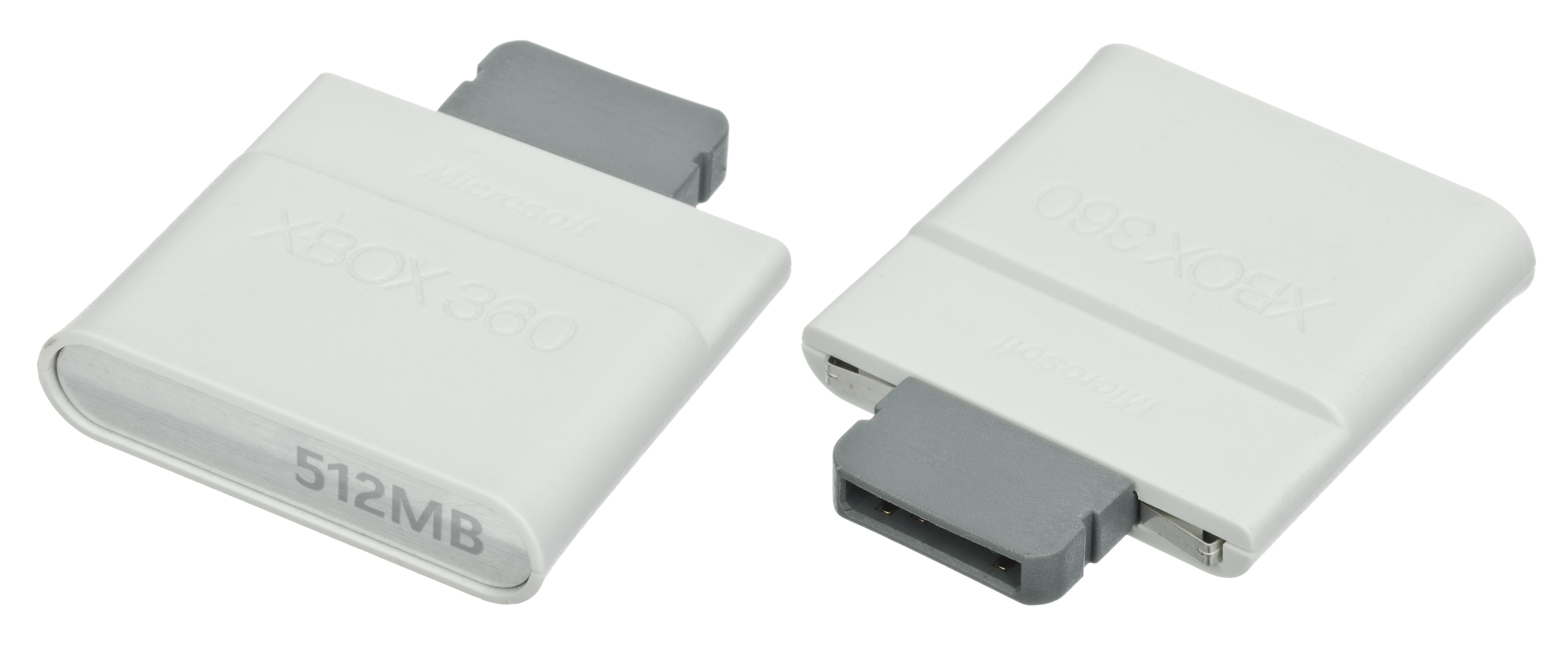
Xbox 360 memory card

== See also ==
- Comparison of memory cards
- Hot swapping
- Memory card reader
- ROM cartridge
