= CineAlta =

Series of digital movie cameras

Sony CineAlta
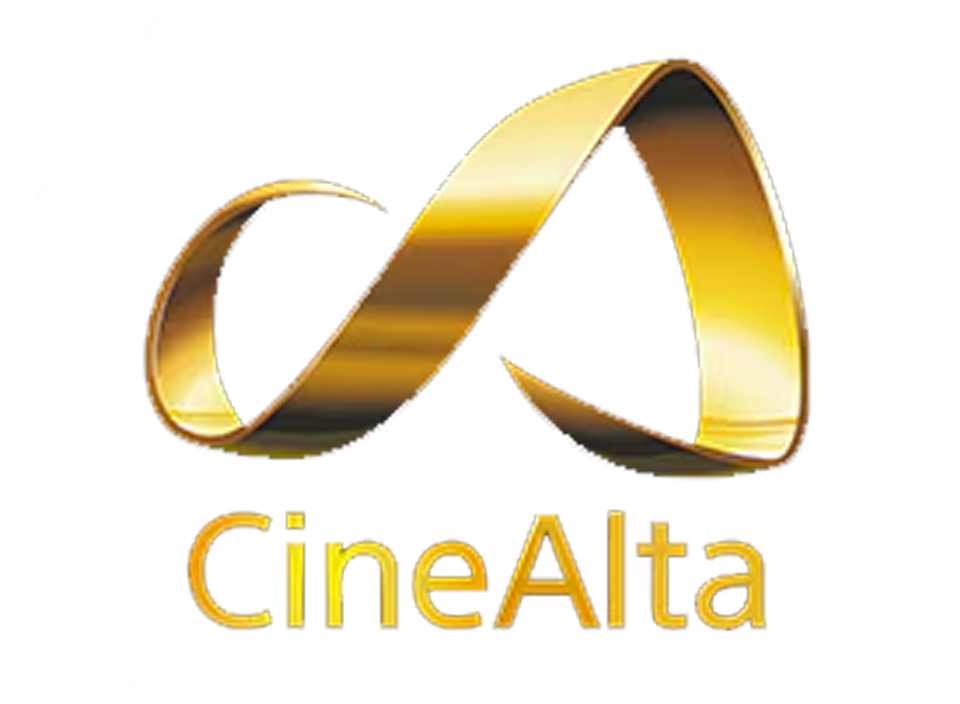
- Type: Video camera
- Inception: 1999
- Manufacturer: Sony
- Website: pro.sony/ue_US/products/digital-cinema-cameras; sony-cinematography.com

CineAlta cameras are a series of professional digital movie cameras produced by Sony that replicate many of the same features of 35mm film motion picture cameras.

== Concept ==
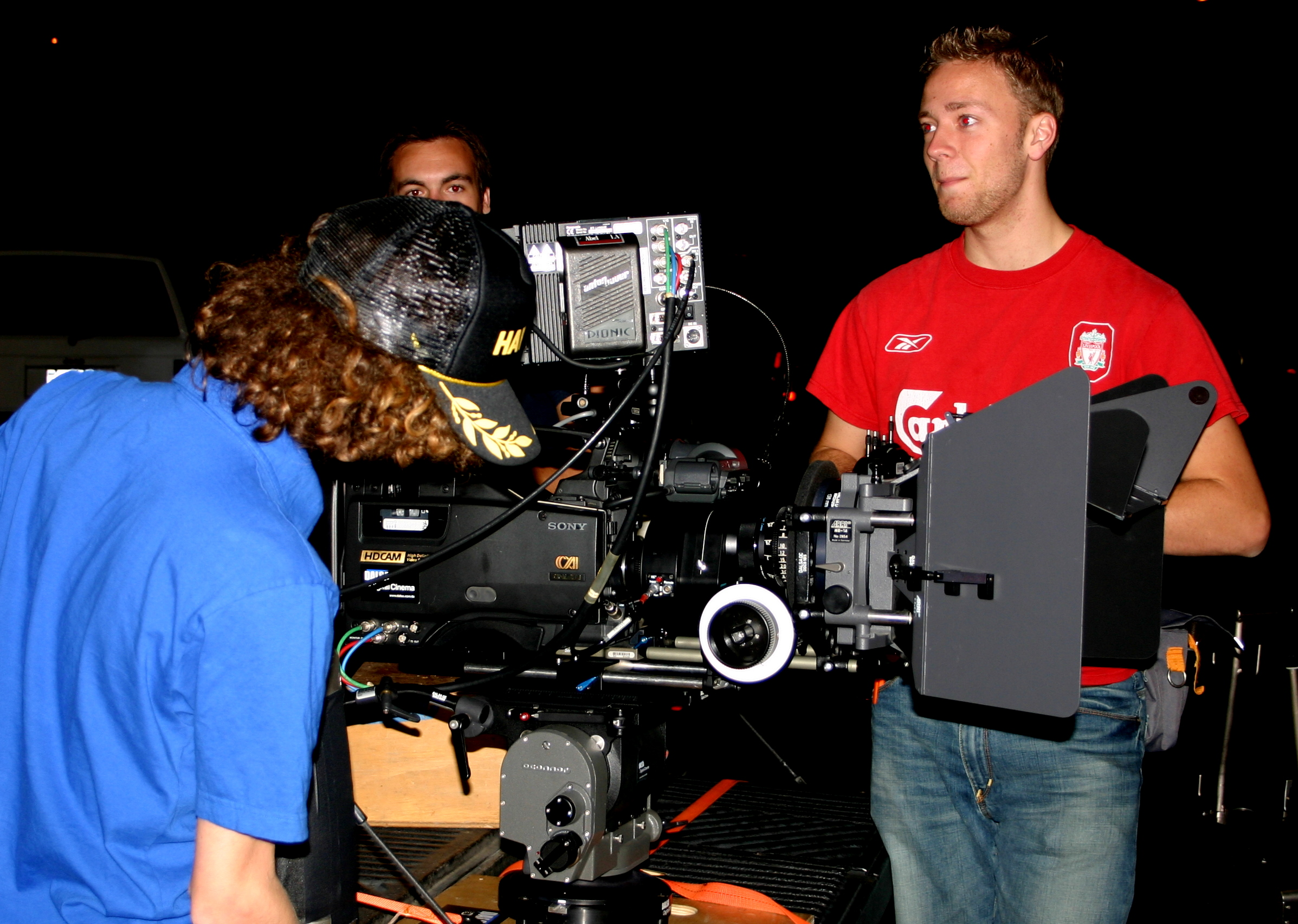
Filming with a CineAlta video

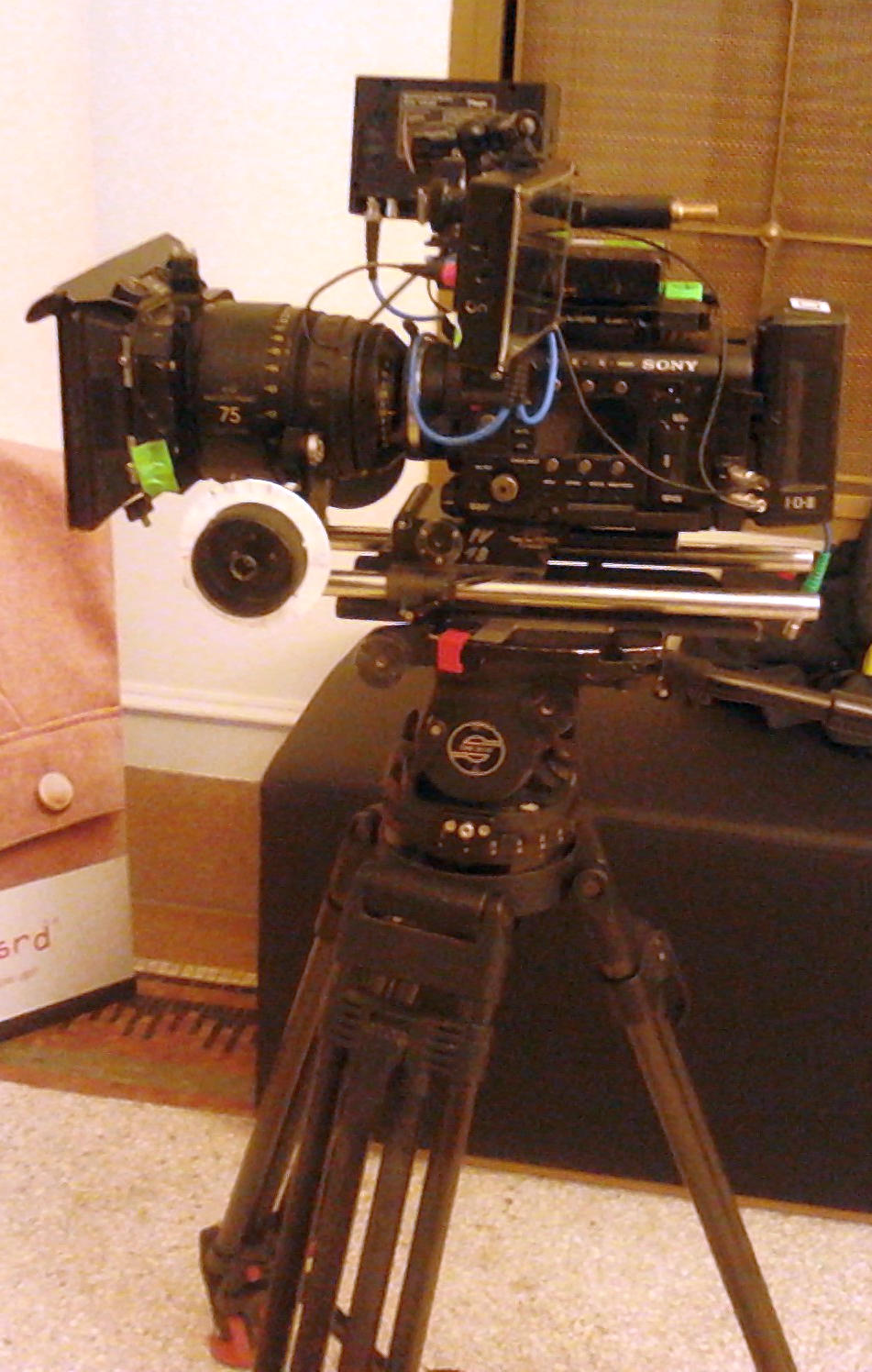
A Sony CineAlta movie camera (Sony F5) with 75mm lens, follow focus, 7" monitor on a Sachtler tripod

CineAlta is a brand name used by Sony to describe various products involved in content creation, production and exhibition process within digital cinema workflow. The first product in the CineAlta line was the Sony HDW-F900, which was also the first HD camera that could shoot at 24 frames per second in true progressive scan. Since then the CineAlta product line has come to include cameras, recorders, cinema servers and projectors. "CineAlta" is a portmanteau of Cine, from cinematography, and Alta, an Italian word for "high".

=== Logo ===
Original CineAlta logo

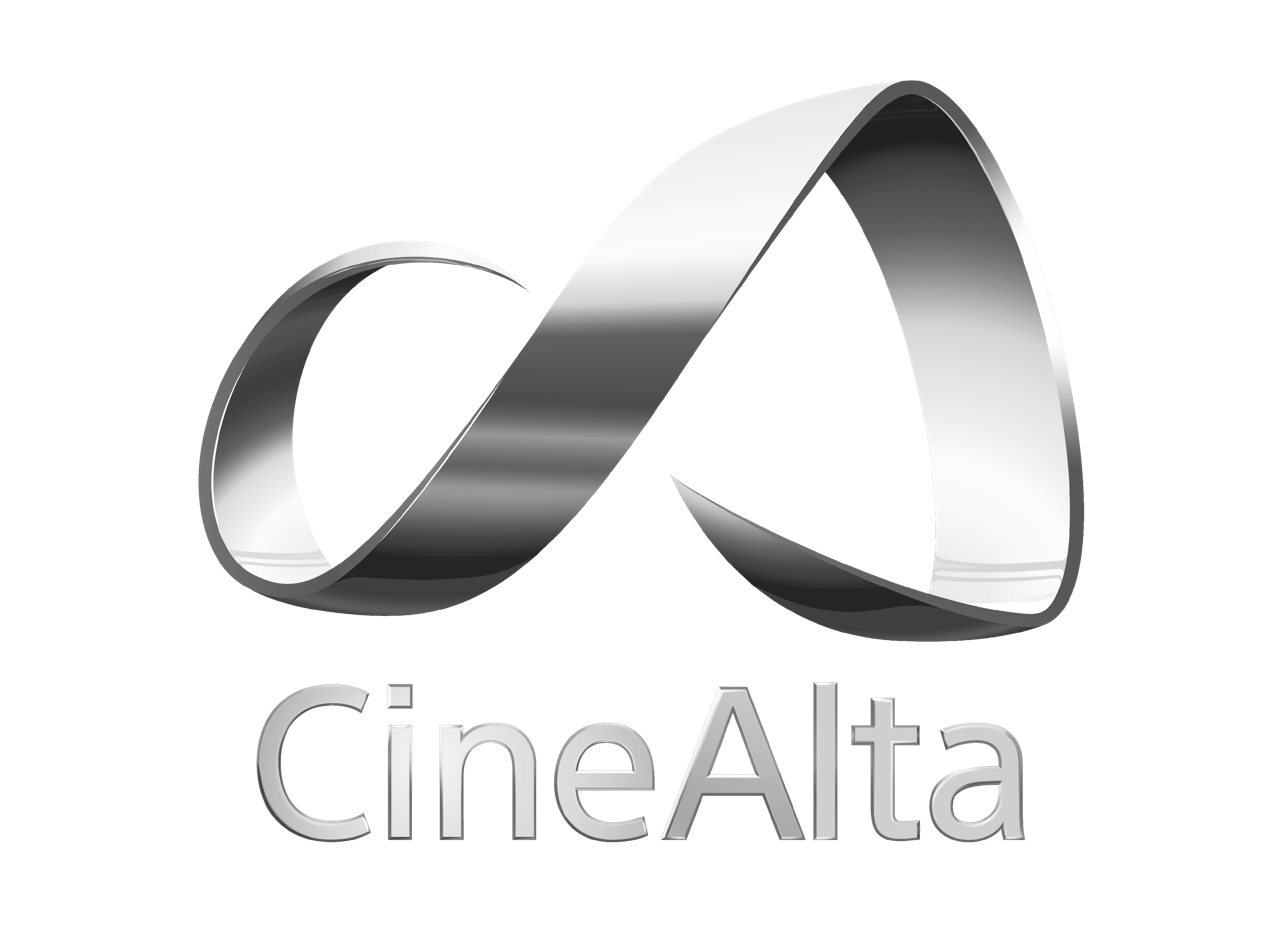
Updated CineAlta logo

The original CineAlta logo was designed by Hiroki Oka, Chief Art Director of Sony CreativeWorks Corporation, based at the Sony Technology Center in Atsugi. The twinned ribbons represent the marriage of film and videotape, arranged in a way to deliberately evoke the infinity symbol, to symbolize the infinite possibilities. An updated version of the logo, designed by Tetsuro Sano, was used for the first time in branding for the F65.

== Format ==
CineAlta cameras have at various points in time recorded onto HDCAM tapes, XDCAM Professional Discs, SRMemory, or SxS and AXS flash memory cards. They have the ability to shoot at various frame rates including 24fps and a resolution of up to 8K. The camera can be used with a Miranda DVC 802 converter. This allows the camera to output SDI, DV, and multiple HD outputs.

Tapeless CineAlta cameras record video as either Apple ProRes or XAVC. Earlier CineAlta cameras also had a raw image format, but since 2016 Sony has replaced it with a compressed linear 16-bit format named X-OCN, which essentially functions exactly like a more traditional raw format.

== History and use in motion pictures ==
In June 1999, George Lucas announced that Episode II of the Star Wars Prequel Trilogy would be the first major motion picture to be shot 100% digitally. Sony and Panavision collaborated to develop the High Definition 24p camera that Lucas would use to accomplish this, and thus the first CineAlta camera was born: the Sony HDW-F900 (also called the Panavision HD-900F after being "panavised"). However, the science-fiction film Vidocq was actually the first released feature that was shot entirely with digital cinematography. Lucas held a private screening of Star Wars: Episode II – Attack of the Clones for the Atsugi Technology Center staff, and inserted a credit to specifically thank the Sony engineers at Atsugi for the use of the HDW-F900.

For Star Wars: Episode III – Revenge of the Sith the more advanced Sony HDC-F950 was used, with higher resolution and better color reproduction than its predecessor. The film was cropped to a 2.40:1 aspect ratio from its native 16:9 frame. As a result, only 818 of the 1080 vertical pixels were actually used. An anamorphic adapter lens is available from Canon to allow shooting in 2.39:1 without losing any pixels. Manuel Huerga's Salvador is the first movie shot with this adapter.

2002's Russian Ark was recorded in uncompressed high definition video using a Sony HDW-F900. The information was recorded uncompressed onto a hard disk which could hold 100 minutes, thus allowing the entire film to be shot in a single 86 minute take. This was very complicated, as in 2001 there wasn't widely available technology for high capacity hard disk recording, and even less for doing this portably, on battery power, indoors and out from −23 °C (−9 °F) to 23 °C (73 °F). Four attempts were made to complete the shot, which had to be completed in one day due to the Hermitage Museum being closed for the shoot. The first three had to be interrupted due to technical faults, but the fourth attempt was completed successfully. Extra material on the DVD release includes a documentary on the technology used.

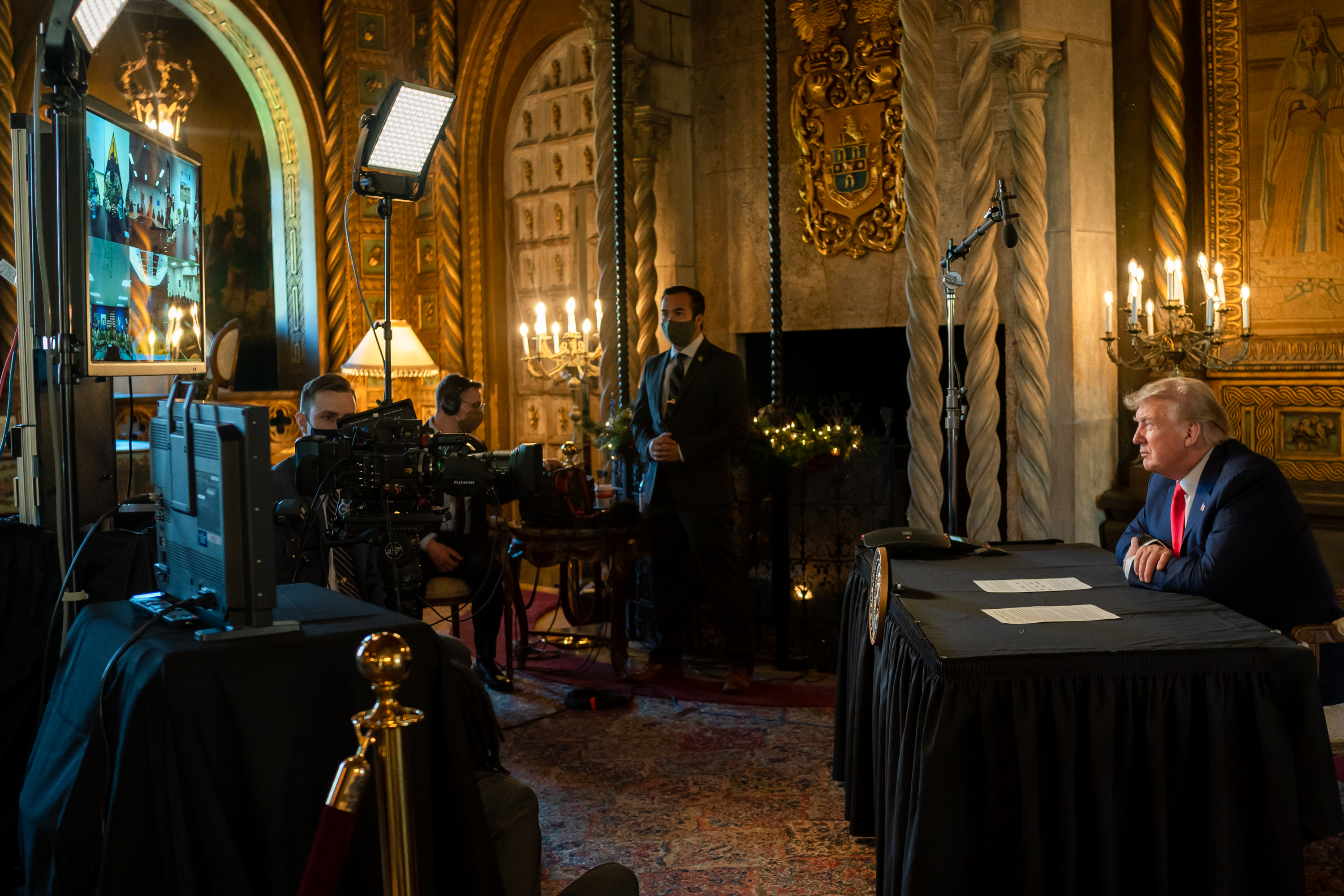
President Trump's video stream filmed using Sony CineAlta PMW F5 and Fujinon XK20-120mm T3.5 lens (Dec. 25, 2020)

Other notable movies that were shot with CineAlta cameras include:

- Vidocq (2001, shot in May 2000)
- Kamen Rider Agito: Project G4 (2001 film) (2001, shot in January 2001) World's first all scenes shot in HD 1080/24P
- All About Lily Chou-Chou (2001, shot August 2000)
- Session 9 (released in 2001, shot in September – October 2000)
- Once Upon a Time in Mexico (released in 2003, shot in May 2001)
- Burning Annie (released in 2007, shot in February 2002)
- Spy Kids 2: The Island of Lost Dreams (2002)
- Spy Kids 3-D: Game Over (2003)
- Dogville (2003)
- Scacco pazzo (2003)
- Sky Captain and the World of Tomorrow (2004)
- The World (2004)
- Zebraman (2004)
- Sin City (2005)
- Caché (film) (2005)
- Crank (2006)
- U2 3D (2008)
- Cloverfield (2008)
- Rachel Getting Married (2008)
- Yesterday Was a Lie (2008)
- Quantum Of Solace (2008)
- Tetro (2009)
- Public Enemies (2009)
- Avatar (2009)
- The Karate Kid (2010 film)
- Tron: Legacy (2010)
- Real Steel (2011)
- Just Go with It (2011)
- Shark Night 3D (2011)
- The Darkest Hour (2011)
- Sanctum (2011)
- The Sunset Limited (2011)
- Mirror Mirror (2012)
- Oblivion (2013)
- After Earth (2013)
- White House Down (2013)
- The Smurfs 2 (2013)
- Evil Dead (2013)
- Winter Sleep (2014)
- Lucy (2014)
- 6 Underground (2019)
- 21 Bridges (2019)
- Downton Abbey (2019)
- Harriet (2019)
- Two of Us (2019)
- Ma Rainey's Black Bottom (2020)
- The Life Ahead (2020)
- Unhinged (2020)
- Quo Vadis, Aida? (2020)
- Bad Boys for Life (2020)
- Tesla (2020)
- The Glorias (2020)
- I Care a Lot (2020)
- Parallel Mothers (2021)
- Coda (2021)
- Black Widow (2021)
- Annette (2021)
- Reminiscence (2021)
- The Mauritanian (2021)
- Cherry (2021)
- Wrath of Man (2021)
- Tom & Jerry (2021)
- Voyagers (2021)
- Peter Rabbit 2: The Runaway (2021)
- Cherry (2021)
- Kate (2021)
- Top Gun: Maverick (2022)
- Hustle (2022)
- Spiderhead (2022)
- The Man From Toronto (2022)
- The Gray Man (2022)
- Do Revenge (2022)
- Weird: The Al Yankovic Story (2022)
- Black Panther: Wakanda Forever (2022)
- Avatar: The Way of Water (2022)
- Matilda the Musical (2022)
- Creed III (2023)
- Tetris (2023)
- Ghosted (2023)
- Beau is Afraid (2023)
- The Pope's Exorcist (2023)
- Mission: Impossible – Dead Reckoning Part One (2023)
- Strays (2023)
- Gran Turismo (2023)
- Godzilla Minus One (2023)
- Civil War (2024)
- A Complete Unknown (2024)
- Beetlejuice Beetlejuice (2024)
- Joker: Folie à Deux (2024)
- Black Phone 2 (2025)
- Mission: Impossible – The Final Reckoning (2025)
- Avatar: Fire and Ash (2025)
- F1 (2025)
- Michael (2026)
- Backrooms (2026)
- Resident Evil (2026)
- Digger (2026)

== List of CineAlta cameras ==
All cameras are made by Sony except where noted:

- BURANO (2023)
- VENICE 2 (2021)
- VENICE (2017)
- F55/F5 (2014)
- NEX-FS700 (2011)
- F65 (2011)
- PMW-F3 (2010)
- SRW-9000PL (2010)
- PMW-500 (2010)
- PDW-F800/700 (2008–2009)
- F35/F23 (2008)
- PMW-EX3 (2008)
- PMW-EX1/EX1R (2006, EX1R in 2009)
- HDW-F900R (2006)
- PDW-F350/F330 (2006)
- HDC-F950 (2003)
- HDW-F900 (2000)

Sony CineAlta model summary
Model	Weight	Size (W×H×D) (Note: Width × Height × Depth, excluding lenses and protrusions)	Sensor	Lens mount	Media	Framerates	Introduced	Current
HDW-F900	18 lb 8 kg (Note: Including lens, battery, and cassette)	5.5×10.4×15.0 in 140×265×380 mm	3×2/3"; CCD	B4	HDCAM	24, 25, 30 (1080p); 50, 60 (1080i)	2000	No No
HDC-F950	11 lb 5.1 kg	5.2×10.9×14.2 in 133×276×360 mm	3×2/3"; CCD	B4	(Note: No onboard recording. Connects to SRW-5000 HDCAM or SRW-1 HDCAM-SR videocassette recorders.)	24 (1080p)	2003	No No
HDW-F900R	12 lb 5.4 kg	5.0×10.6×13.6 in 127×269×345 mm	3×2/3"; CCD	B4	HDCAM	24, 25, 30 (1080p); 50, 60 (1080i)	2006	No No
PDW-F350	8.5 lb 3.85 kg (Note: Approximately 12 lb (5.4 kg) with viewfinder, microphone, Professional Disc, and battery)	4.9×10.6×12.9 in 124×268×328 mm	3×1/2"; CCD	Sony 1/2" bayonet	XDCAM PFD	4–60 (1080p)	2006	No No
PDW-F330	8.5 lb 3.85 kg	4.9×10.6×12.9 in 124×268×328 mm	3×1/2"; CCD	Sony 1/2" bayonet	XDCAM PFD	24, 25, 30 (1080p); 50, 60 (1080i)	2006	No No
PMW-EX1/EX1R	5.3 lb 2.4 kg (Note: Approximately 6.2 lb (2.8 kg) with battery and SxS card.)	7.01×6.93×12.26 in 178×176×311.5 mm (Note: With lens.)	3×1/2"; CMOS	Fixed	2×SxS	1–30 (1080p); 1–60 (720p)	2007 (Note: EX1R announced in 2009 with upgraded features.)	No No
PMW-EX3	4.2 lb 1.9 kg (Note: Approximately 7.9 lb (3.6 kg) with lens, battery and SxS card.)	9.8×8.3×15.7 in 250×210×400 mm	3×1/2"; CMOS	EX-mount	2×SxS	1–30 (1080p); 1–60 (720p)	2008	No No
F23	11.0 lb 5.0 kg	7.85×8.62×7.79 in 199.3×219×197.8 mm	3×2/3"; CCD	B4	(Note: No onboard recording. Connects to SRW-1 HDCAM-SR videocassette recorder. Solid state SRMemory compatible via dockable SR-R1.)	1–60 (1080p) (Note: Requires HKSR-102 to be installed in SRW-1 for 50/60fps in 4:2:2 mode; requires both HKSR-102 and HKSR-103 for 50/60fps in 4:4:4 mode.)	2007	No No
F35	11.0 lb 5.0 kg	7.85×8.62×7.79 in 199.3×219×197.8 mm	1×Super 35; CCD	PL	(Note: No onboard recording. Connects to SRW-1 HDCAM-SR videocassette recorder. Solid state SRMemory compatible via dockable SR-R1.)	1–50 (1080p)	2008	No No
PDW-700	9.5 lb 4.3 kg (Note: 13.2 pounds 6.0 kilograms with battery, viewfinder, and microphone.)	4.9×10.6×13.1 in 124×269×332 mm	3×2/3"; CCD	B4	XDCAM PFD	24, 25, 30 (1080p); 50, 60 (1080i)	2008	No No
PDW-F800	9.5 lb 4.3 kg	4.9×10.6×13.1 in 124×269×332 mm	3×2/3"; CCD	B4	XDCAM PFD	1–60 (1080p)	2009	No No
PMW-500	7.5 lb 3.4 kg	4.9×10.6×13.1 in 124×269×332 mm	3×2/3"; CCD	B4	2×SxS	1–30 (1080p); 1–60 (720p)	2010	No No
SRW-9000PL	15 lb 6.9 kg (Note: Including lens, battery, and cassette)	5.8×8.3×13.0 in 148×211×330 mm	1×Super 35; CCD	PL	HDCAM-SR (Note: Attaches to SR-R1 via HD-SDI to allow recording to solid state SRMemory.)	24, 25, 30 (1080p); 50, 60 (1080i) (Note: Variable frame rate 1–60 fps when HKSR-9002 Picture Cache Board is installed.)	2010	No No
F3 (Note: Available as a kit (with 35mm, 50mm, 85mm T2.0 PL-mount prime lenses, PMW-F3K) and bare body (PMW-F3L))	5.3 lb 2.4 kg	5.9×7.4×8.3 in 151×189×210 mm	1×Super 35; CMOS	FZ (Note: PL with included adapter)	2×SxS	1–30 (1080p); 1–60 (720p)	2010	No No
F65	11.0 lb 5.0 kg (Note: 14 lb (6.5 kg) with accessories)	8.9×8.0×8.1 in 227×203×205 mm	1×Super 35; CMOS	PL	SRMemory (Note: Via external docking recorder SR-R4.)	1–60 (8K); 1–120 (4K)	2011	No No
NEX-FS700	3.7 lb 1.68 kg (Note: 6.7 lb (3.06 kg) with lens, battery, microphone, handle, viewfinder.)	5.71×7.03×9.27 in 145×178.5×235.5 mm	1×Super 35; CMOS	E	MS PRO Duo, SD/SDHC/SDXC (Note: AXSM via optional AXS-R5 recorder and HXR-IFR5 interface units.)	1–240 (1080p)	2012	No No
F5	4.9 lb 2.2 kg	5.1×4.9×7.5 in 130×125×191 mm	1×Super 35; CMOS	FZ	2×SxS, AXSM (Note: Via external docking recorder AXS-R5.)	1–60 (4K) (Note: F5 requires optional upgrade for 4K in XAVC.); 1–240 (2K) (Note: Limited to 180fps when recording in 2K XAVC)	2012	No No
F55	4.9 lb 2.2 kg	5.1×4.9×7.5 in 130×125×191 mm	1×Super 35; CMOS	FZ	2×SxS, AXSM	1–60 (4K); 1–240 (2K)	2012	No No
VENICE (Note: Model number MPC-3610)	8.6 lb 3.9 kg	5.2×6.3×6.8 in 133×159×172 mm	1×Full Frame (Note: 36 mm × 24 mm (1.42 in × 0.94 in) sensor size.); CMOS	E (Note: Lever-lock variant of E-mount, which allows the rotation of a lever, rather than the lens.)	2×SxS, 2×AXSM (Note: Via external docking recorder AXS-R7.)	1–30 (6K); 1–60 (4K)	2017	Yes Yes
VENICE 2 (8.6K) (Note: Model number MPC-3628)	9.5 lb 4.3 kg	6.0×6.2×9.8 in 152×158×250 mm	1×Full Frame; CMOS	E	2×AXSM	1–30 (8.6K); 1–90 (5.8K)	2021	Yes Yes
VENICE 2 (6K) (Note: Model number MPC-3626)	9.3 lb 4.2 kg	6.0×6.2×9.8 in 152×158×250 mm	1×Full Frame; CMOS	E	2×AXSM	1–90 (6K); 1–110 (4K)	2021	Yes Yes
BURANO (Note: Model number MPC-2610)	5.3 lb 2.4 kg	5.74×5.61×8.59 in 145.7×142.5×218.1 mm	1×Full Frame; CMOS	E	2× CFexpress Type B	24, 25, 30 (8.6K); 24, 25, 30, 50, 60 (6K); 24, 25, 30, 50, 60, 100, 120 (4K)	2023	Yes Yes

== See also ==
- Sony camcorders
- Digital cinematography
- Panavision HD-900F
- PMW-EX1
- Varicam
- AXIOM (camera)
