= Astron Card =

Storage medium for computer software

The Astron Card is a ROM cartridge originally marketed as a software distribution medium for MSX computers. The Astron Card was developed by Astar International Company of Tokyo, Japan, and manufactured by Mitsubishi Electric. It was released in 1985 by Astar domestically in Japan and resold by Electric Software of England as the Astron SoftCard for the MSX and by Cumana of Surrey under its original name for multiple platforms. Ashton Cards are approximately the size of a credit card but thicker and are incompatible with the similar Hudson Soft Bee Card.

== Specifications ==
Astron Cards are approximately the size of a credit card but thicker (at 2 mm) and are incompatible with the similar Hudson Soft Bee Card, having 38 rather than 32 contact pads. Both used an adaptor inserted into a MSX cartridge slot as the means connect the cards, however, meaning users could switch between the two formats with ease, albeit they did not have interoperability with each other.

The Astron IC Card contains up to 1 MB of CMOS RAM and either a mask ROM, an EPROM, or an EEPROM for the stored program. The contents of the CMOS RAM are backed up by a five-year lithium battery.

== Development ==
The Astron Card was developed by Astar International Company, a Japanese electronics company based in Tokyo. Astar originally sold the Astron Card for the Japanese domestic market. The company contracted manufacturing of the Astron Card to Mitsubishi Electric, also of Tokyo. In June 1985, Astar signed a contract with Electric Software, a subsidiary of the England-based GST Computer Systems centered on MSX software, to resell the Astron Card in the United Kingdom for British MSX users. Electric Software renamed it the Astron SoftCard on its release in the United Kingdom in late 1985. It was the first credit-card-sized ROM cartridge sold in the United Kingdom. As cassette tapes were the standard data storage medium in the United Kingdom at the time, Electronic Software touted the Astron SoftCard's instant-load nature, being a solid-state medium, as well as its resilience to data loss and piracy. While primarily aimed at game developers, Electronic Software envisioned the Astron SoftCard as a versatile tool used for productivity software, general data storage, and access control à la smart cards. The company projected sales of two million units for 1986.

In early 1986, Cumana of Surrey signed a deal with Astar to market the Astron Card under its original name in the United Kingdom alongside Electric Software. Cumana chiefly marketed the Astron Card as a medium for productivity software; to this end, the first software product the company sold for it was Pocket WordStar by MicroPro. Cumana initially sold an adaptor card for the Sinclair QL only, but by mid-1987 the company had developed adaptors for the IBM Personal Computer, the BBC Micro, the Amstrad CPC, and the Commodore 64 in 1987. The DHSS used the Ashton Card on the QL for use in hospitals and pharmacies for a time during a trial run in 1985.

In February 1986, Aster International signed a licensing agreement with General Instrument (GI) of the United States to second source production of the Aster Card for distribution in Japan. GI produced the RAM and ROM chips for the Aster Cards from their plant in Phoenix, Arizona, while the final package was assembled from GI's plant in Kaohsiung, Taiwan.

Electronic Software also announced a version of the Astron SoftCard for the Commodore 64 and Commodore 128 in July 1986. Although the company licensed the technology to multiple independent game publishers by the time of this announcement, it is not known if this version ever shipped.

== Reception ==
Despite initial intrigue from customers and software houses, the Astron Card struggled with poor adoption rates. Simon Williams of BEEBUG interpreted this as a chicken-and-egg problem: customers would only have had interest in the medium should there have been a large amount of pre-existing software released for it; while software publishers would only have had interest in releasing software in the format should there have been a large installed base.

== Software published on Astron SoftCard ==
- Backgammon
- Barnstormer
- Chack 'N' Pock
- Chord Q
- Lé Mans II
- Shark Hunter
- Sweet Acorn
- The Wreck
- Xyzolog
