= Memory card reader =

Device for reading data on a memory card

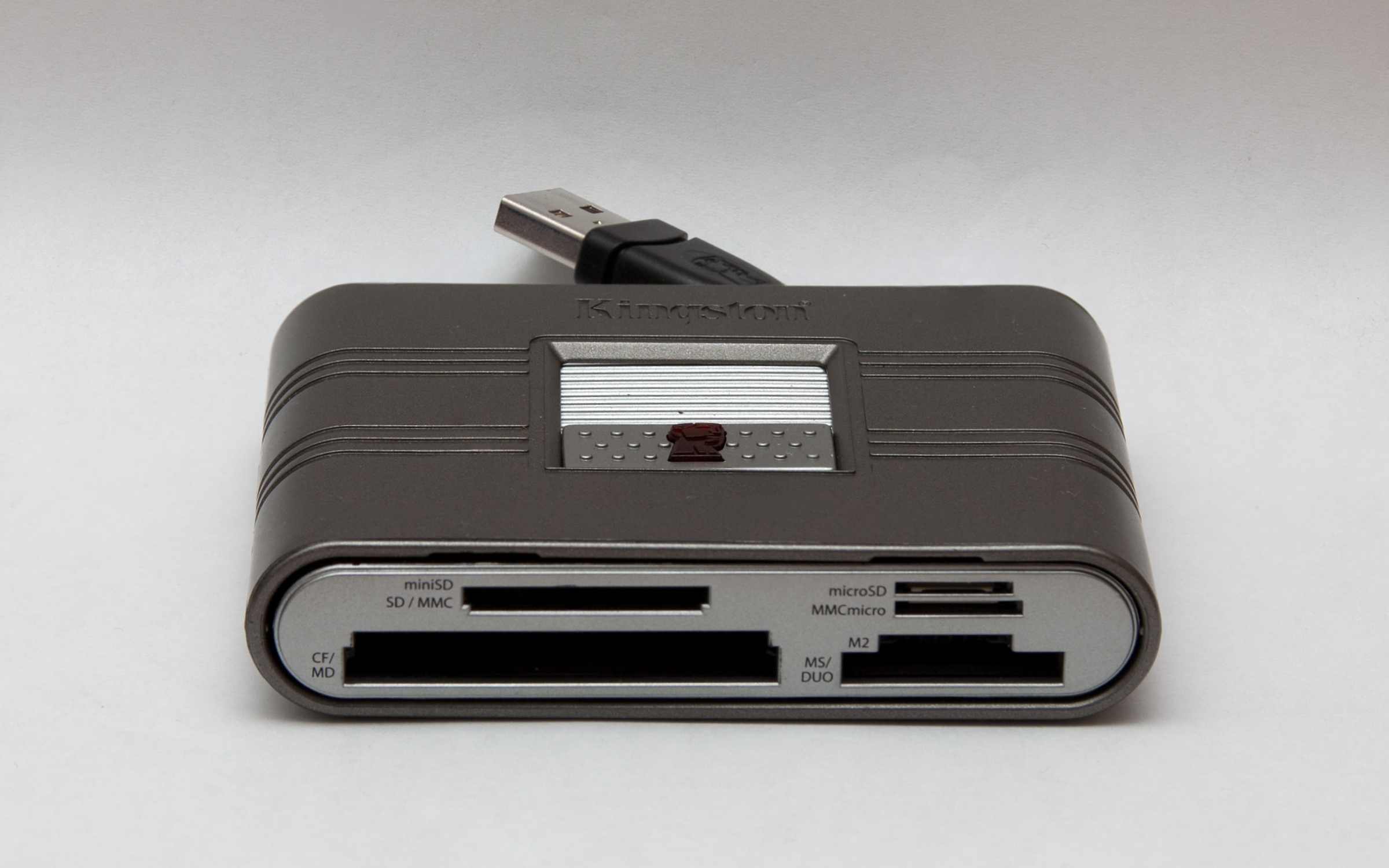
Typical modern memory card reader, compatible with many common formats

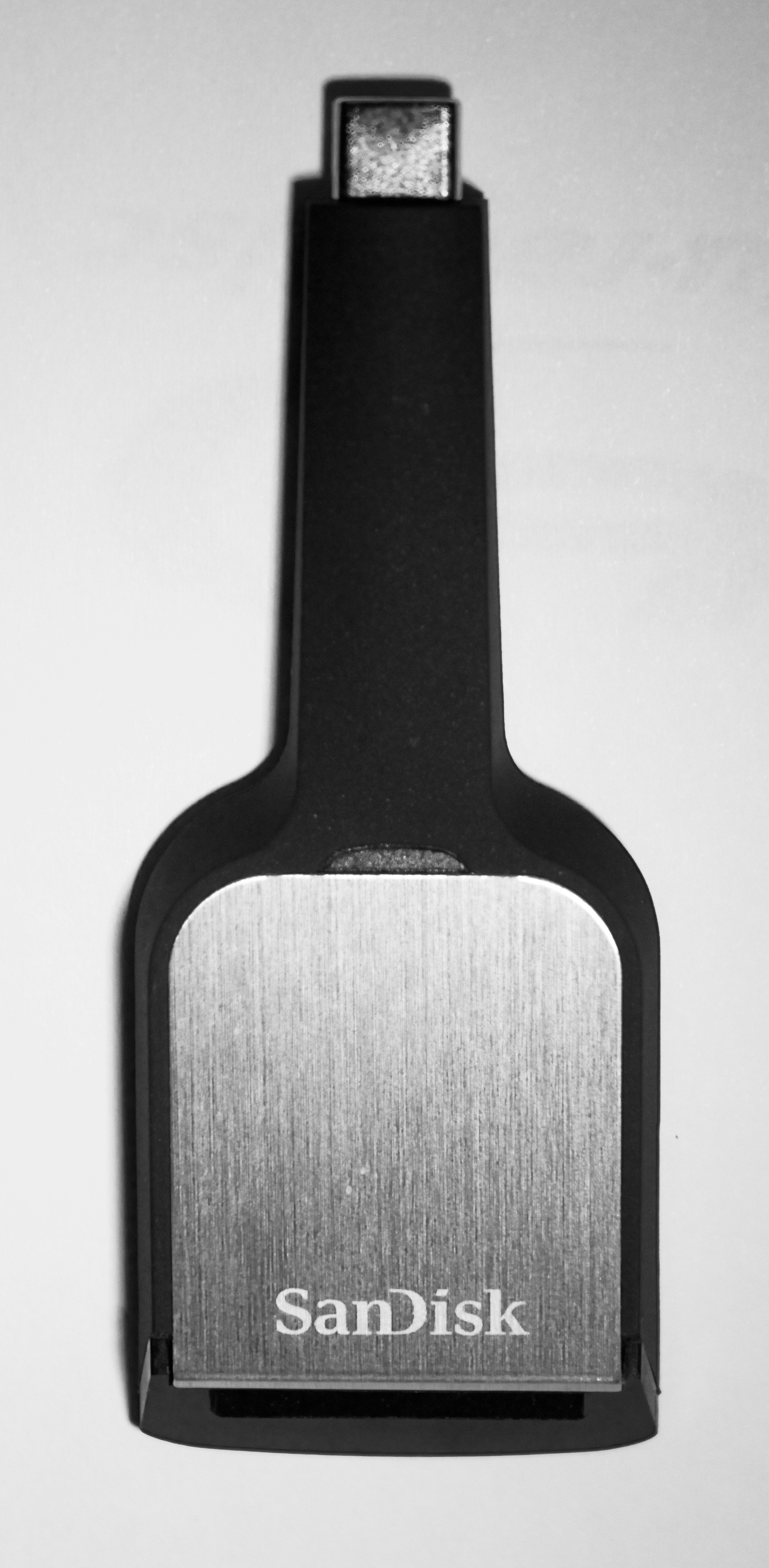
USB-C UHS-II SD card reader

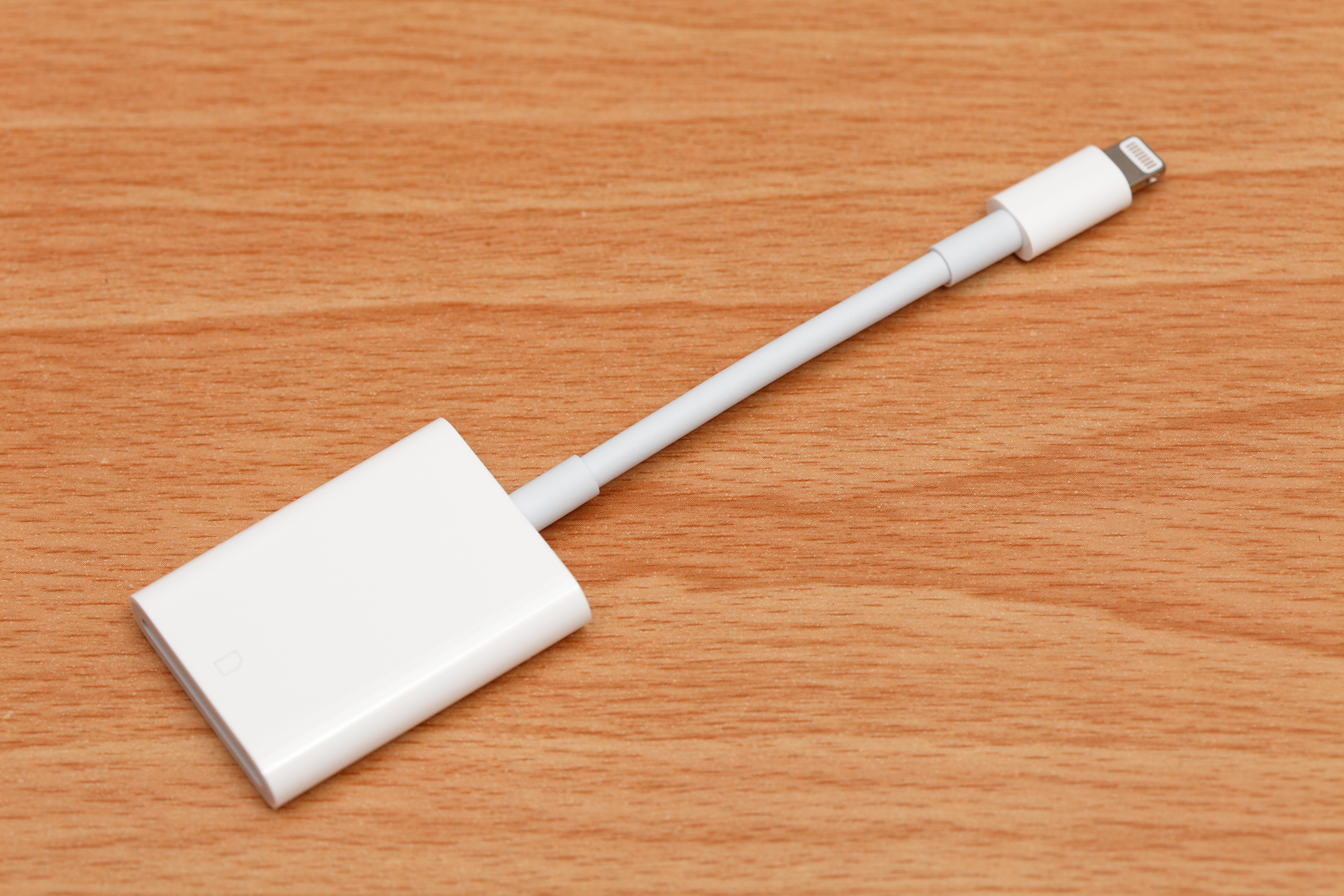
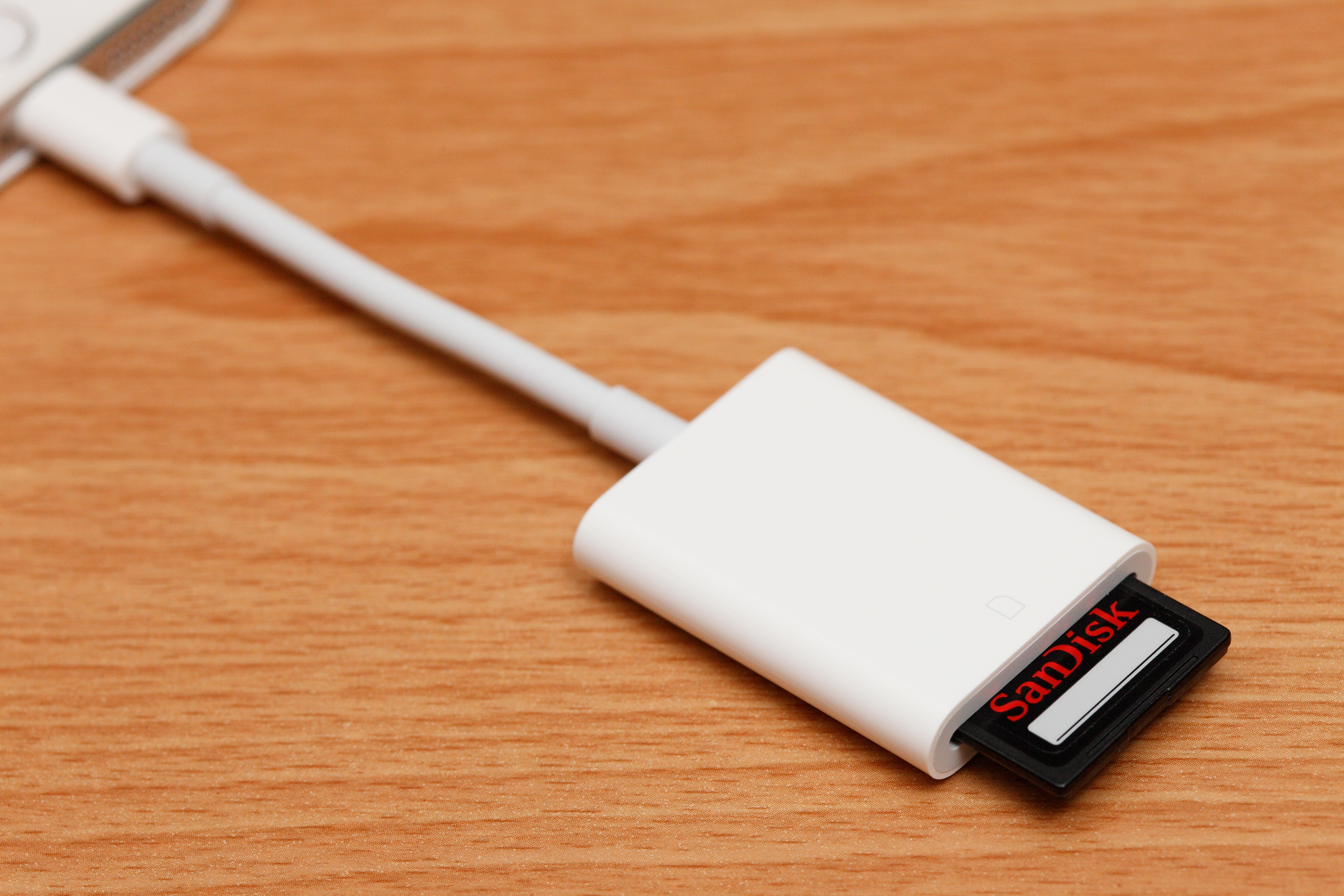
Lightning to SD Card Camera Reader

A memory card reader is a device for accessing the data on a memory card such as a CompactFlash (CF), Secure Digital (SD) or MultiMediaCard (MMC). Most card readers also offer write capability, and together with the card, this can function as a pen drive.

Some printers and smartphones have a built-in card reader, as do many laptops and the majority of tablet computers.

A multi card reader is used for communication with more than one type of flash memory card. Multi card readers do not have built-in memory capacity, but are able to accept multiple types and styles of memory cards.

Memory card readers, unlike smartphones, telephones and other devices, such as cameras and digital cameras, allow formatting in a file system other than FAT (FAT16, FAT32, exFAT) to NTFS in Windows, ext, ext2, ext3 in Linux or HFS, HFS + for Mac OS. Smartphones or other devices like cameras format them only in FAT. Internal card readers are usually connected to internal USB 1.1 / 2.0 / 3.x ports

The number of compatible memory cards varies from reader to reader and can include more than 20 different types. The number of different memory cards that a multi card reader can accept is expressed as x-in-1, with x being a figure of merit indicating the number of memory cards accepted, such as 35-in-1. There are three categories of card readers sorted by the type and quantity of the card slots: single card reader (e.g. 1x SD-only), multi card reader (e.g. 9-in-1) and series card reader (e.g. 4x SD-only).

Some kinds of memory cards with their own USB functions do not need the card reader, such as the Intelligent Stick memory card, which can plug directly into a USB slot.

The USB device class used is 0x08.

Modern UDMA-7 CompactFlash Cards and UHS-I Secure Digital cards provide data rates in excess of 89 MB/s and up to 145 MB/s, when used with memory card readers capable of USB 3.0 data transfer rates. As of 2011, Secure Digital memory cards received an additional option of a UHS-II bus interface. It increased the maximum data transfer speed to 312 MB/s.

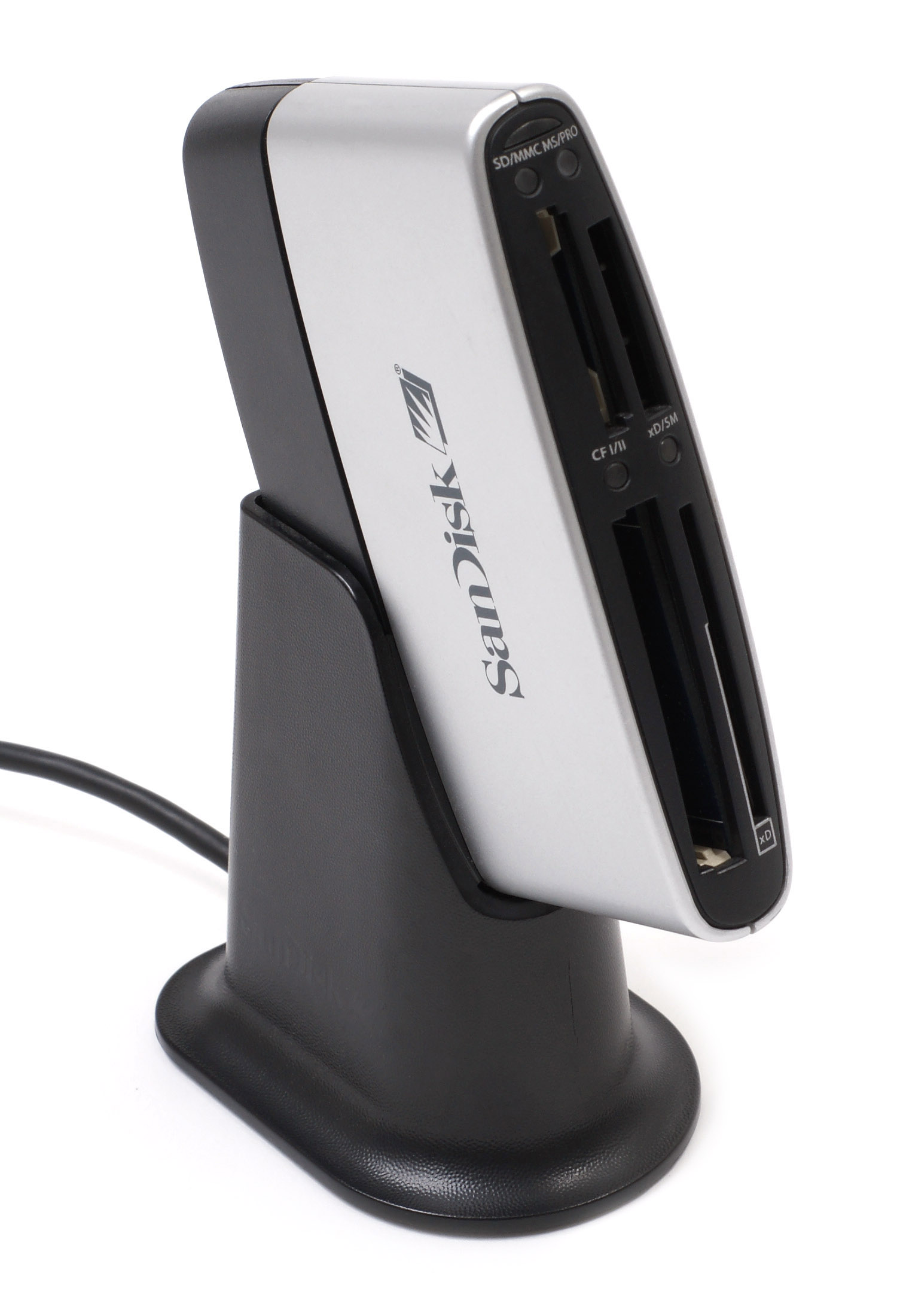
USB card readers like this one typically implement the USB mass storage device class

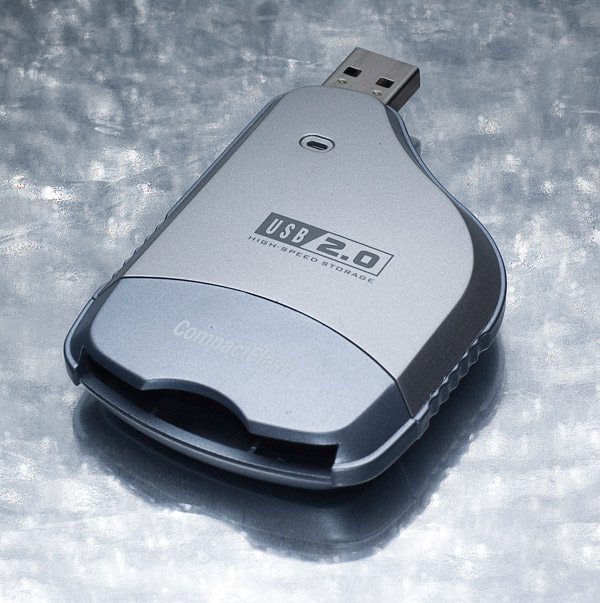
Generic CompactFlash card reader with high-speed storage via USB2.0

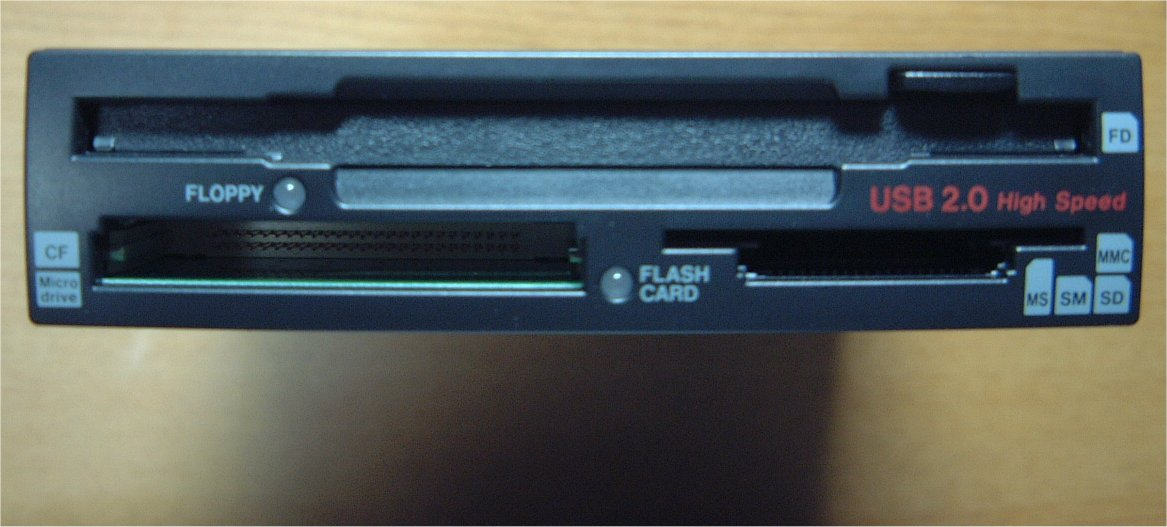
Cardreader combined with floppy disk drive

PCIe 1x eSATAp controller card with CompactFlash memory card reader

== See also ==
- Card reader
