= Panavision HD-900F =

Digital high definition movie camera

The Panavision HD-900F is the first digital high definition camera, able to record using the standard motion picture frame rate of 24 frames per second. It is the result of a collaboration of Panavision and Sony in 1997.

== Technical aspects ==
Panavision and Sony created a new viewfinder, which is entirely redesigned from the old film camera setup, to allow easier controls while filming. The changes were made in order to produce a film friendly system that utilizes many standard camera accessories, such as the follow focus, matte box, heads, etc.

The camera has image quality comparable to industry standards, the lenses utilize state-of-the-art components with the camera itself is still compact and lightweight. The zoom lenses optimize maximum image quality, thus enabling depths of field similar to the 35mm cine formats seen today.

For CGI filmmakers, a pre-filter is used for better color matching and better enhanced resolution for bluescreen effects.

== Cinema history ==
The HD-900F High Definition Camera System was first used for a feature film by Jesse Dylan for How High.

Since that time, the HD-900F has been used in:

- Yesterday Was a Lie (2009)
- Corners (2007)
- Dexter (2006)
- On the Brink (2006)
- All In (2005)
- D.E.B.S. (2004)
- Sight for Sore Eyes, A (2004)
- DC 9/11: Time of Crisis (2003) (TV)
- Exit (2003)
- Long and Short of It, The (2003)
- Night Before, The (2003)
- Raine (2003) (V)
- Dream Hackers (2002) (TV)
- Gåvan (2002)
- Kermit's Swamp Years: The Real Story Behind Kermit the Frog's Early Years (2002) (V)
- Manassas: End of Innocence (2002)
- Osynlige, Den (2002)
- Spy Kids 2: The Island of Lost Dreams (2002)
- Star Wars: Episode II – Attack of the Clones (2002)
- Sweet Friggin' Daisies (2002)
- Two Paths (2002)
- Wednesday (2002)
- eMale (2001)
- How High (2001)

== See also ==
- CineAlta
