= Mitsubishi Plastics =

Japanese chemical company

Logo

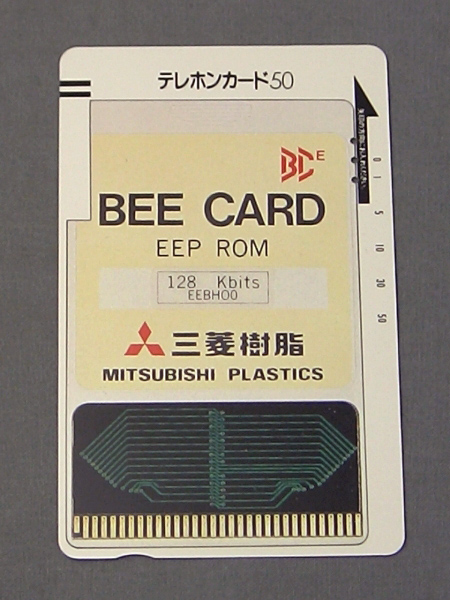
Bee Card from Mitsubishi Plastics

Mitsubishi Plastics, Inc. (三菱樹脂株式会社, Mitsubishi Jushi Kabushiki-gaisha) (TYO: 4213) is a Japanese chemical company with Head Office at 1-2-2, Nihonbashihongokucho, Chuo-ku, Tokyo 103-0021, Japan.

Produces various kinds of synthetic resins. The Company's products include polyvinyl chloride pipes and films. The Company also manufactures construction materials and electronic industry materials. It is one of the Mitsubishi core companies. Hishi Plastics USA, an ISO 9001:2008 Quality System certified subsidiary, located in Lincoln Park, New Jersey, is focusing R&D on non-phthalate alternatives to traditional plastic resins. These include corn & soya based compounds as well as materials of a completely distinct origin. Several of these have been approved by UL Labs and are nearly ready for production scale extrusion.

== Shareholders ==
Principal Shareholders (as of March 31, 2005):

- Mitsubishi Chemical Corporation 52.6%
- Japan Trustee Services Bank, Ltd. (Trust Account) 4.22%
- The Master Trust Bank of Japan, Ltd. (Trust Account) 2.34%
- The Bank of Tokyo-Mitsubishi, Ltd. 2.17%
- The Mitsubishi Trust and Banking Corporation (Trust Account) 1.45%
- The Mitsubishi Trust and Banking Corporation 1.38%
- Norinchukin Bank 1.31%
- Mitsubishi Plastics Employees' Stock Ownership Plan 1.08%
- Meiji Yasuda Life Insurance Company 0.83%
- Mitsubishi Corporation 0.70%

On July 29, 2007 the company's stocks were delisted from the Tokyo Stock Exchange and the Osaka Securities Exchange, as Mitsubishi Chemical Holdings Corporation acquired a 100% interest in the company.

== Group companies ==
=== Japan ===
- Alpolic Co.
- Astro Corp.
- Dia Molding Co., Ltd.
- Dia Packaging Materials Co., Ltd.
- Dia Services Co., Ltd.
- Etsuryo Co., Ltd.
- Hanyu Plastics Industries Ltd.
- Hokuryo Mold Co., Ltd.
- Mitsubishi Plastics Marketing Co., Ltd.
- MKV DREAM CO., LTD.
- Quadrant Polypenco Japan Ltd.
- Ryobi Techno Inc.
- Ryohsei Plastic Industries Co., Ltd.
- Ryoju Corp.
- Ryoko Tekunika Co., Ltd.
- Ryouei Co., Ltd.
- Ryoukou Industrial Co., Ltd.
- Ryowa Logitem Co., Ltd.
- Toyo Plastics Industries Corp.
- Kodama Chemical Industry Co., Ltd.
- M&S Pipe Systems Co., Ltd.
- Mikado Chemical M.F.G. Co.
- Nitto Kako Co., Ltd.
- Ryoko Plastic Co., Ltd.
- Taisei Co., Ltd.
- IFCO Japan Inc.
- K.K. MKV Yokkaichi

=== Asia ===
- Mitsubishi Plastics Asia Pacific Pte. Ltd.
- Mitsubishi Plastics Trading Shanghai Co., Ltd.
- MP International (Hong Kong) Ltd.
- PT. MC PET FILM INDONESIA
- Shanghai Baoling Plastics Co., Ltd.
- Tai-Young Film Co., Ltd.
- Wuxi SSS-Diamond Plastics Co., Ltd.

=== America ===
- Hishi Plastics U.S.A., Inc.
- Mitsubishi Plastics Composites America, Inc.
- Mitsubishi Polyester Film, Inc.

=== Europe ===
- Aquamit B.V.
- Mitsubishi Plastics Euro Asia Ltd.
- Dia Moulding Slovakia s.r.o.
- Mitsubishi Polyester Film GmbH
- Quadrant AG
