= SxS =

Memory card format

SxS (S-by-S) is a flash memory standard compliant to the Sony and SanDisk-created ExpressCard standard. According to Sandisk and Sony, the cards have transfer rates of 800 Mbit/s and burst transfer rate of up to 2.5 Gbit/s over the ExpressCard's PCI Express interface. Sony uses these cards as the storage medium for their XDCAM EX line of professional video cameras.

== Compatibility ==
The card can be inserted directly into an ExpressCard slot, available on many notebooks. However, it will only work in Windows and Mac OS X, and only with a Sony device driver installed on the machine. Experimental Linux drivers are also available.

The only universal connectivity for these cards is the Sony SBAC-US10 and Sony SBAC-US20. These external USB adapters will make the cards visible to any system as an external USB hard drive. The Sony SBAC-US20 uses the USB 3.0 interface and has a suggested retail price of US$350.

== SxS PRO+ ==
SxS PRO+ is a faster version of SxS designed for the recording of 4K resolution video. SxS Pro+ has a guaranteed minimum recording speed of 1.3 Gbit/s and an interface with a theoretical maximum speed of 8 Gbit/s.

SxS PRO+ media cards are used on three CineAlta cameras which are the Sony PMW-F55 Sony PMW-F5, and the Sony Venice. The XAVC recording format can record 4K resolution at 60 fps with 4:2:2 chroma subsampling at 600 Mbit/s. A 128 Gigabyte SxS PRO+ media card can record up to 20 minutes of 4K resolution XAVC video at 60 fps, up to 40 minutes of 4K resolution XAVC video at 30 fps, and up to 120 minutes of 2K resolution XAVC video at 30 fps.

== See also ==
- P2 (storage media)
- XAVC - A recording format that can be used with SxS PRO+ media cards
