= Bee Card (game cartridge) =

ROM cartridge medium for MSX computer software

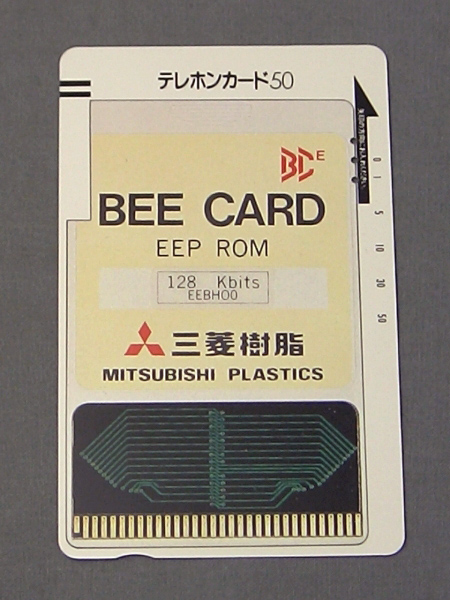
128-kilobit Bee Card telephone card manufactured by Mitsubishi Plastics

A Bee Card (ビーカード, Bī Kādo) is a ROM cartridge developed by Hudson Soft as a software distribution medium for MSX computers. Bee Cards are approximately the size of a credit card but thicker, and incompatible with the similar Electronic Software Astron SoftCard, having 32 rather than 38 contact pads. Compared to most game cartridges, the Bee Card is small and compact. Bee Cards were released in Japan and Europe but not North America because the MSX was unsuccessful in that market. However, Atari Corporation adopted the Bee Card for the Atari Portfolio, a handheld PC released in 1989 in North America. Some Korg Synthesizers and workstations also used Bee Cards as external storage of user content like sound programs or song data. Even though these systems all use Bee Cards, they are incompatible.

Only a few MSX software titles were published on Bee Card: six in Japan and only two in Europe and Italy. To accept a Bee Card, the cartridge slot of the MSX had to be fitted with a removable adapter: the Hudson Soft BeePack. The first mass-produced Bee Cards, however, were EEPROM telephone cards manufactured by Mitsubishi Plastics; these were first sold in Japan in 1985. The trade names Bee Card and Bee Pack derive from Hudson Soft's corporate logo, which features a cartoon bee.

== MSX software published on Bee Card ==
Hudson Soft and other software publishers distributed at least eleven MSX software titles on Bee Card:

Title	Catalog number	Publisher	Year
Baseball Craze	BC-M1, BC-M1E	Hudson Soft	1985
Star Force (exclusive to Japan)	BC-M2	Tehkan	1985
Jet Set Willy	BC-M3	Hudson Soft	1985
T-Plan (exclusive to Italy)	BC-M4	Toshiba	1984
Pooyan (exclusive to Japan)	BC-M5	Konami	1985
Buggy Jump (exclusive to Japan, unreleased)	BC-M6	Hudson Soft	1986
Bomber Man Special (exclusive to Japan)	BC-M7	Hudson Soft / Japanese Softbank	1986
Star Soldier (exclusive to Japan)	BC-M8	Hudson Soft	1986
Master Takahashi's Adventure Island (Japan-exclusive)	BC-M9	Hudson Soft	1986
Videotel (exclusive to Italy)	128-8 5509	Micro Technology B.V.	?

== HuCard ==
Hudson Soft later collaborated with NEC to develop a new video game console called PC Engine. The companies elected to use Hudson Soft's slim ROM cartridge technology to distribute PC Engine software. Hudson Soft adapted the design for their needs and produced the HuCard. HuCards are slightly thicker than Bee Cards; whereas a Bee Card has 32 pins, a HuCard has 38.

== See also ==
- Sega Card
- HuCard
- Astron SoftCard
