= Cumana (company) =

English computer peripheral manufacturer

- Industry: Computer peripherals
- Defunct: 1995

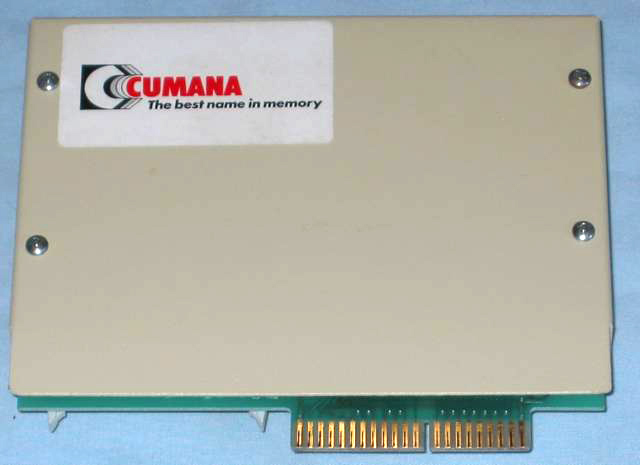
Cumana Floppy Disk System for the Acorn Electron

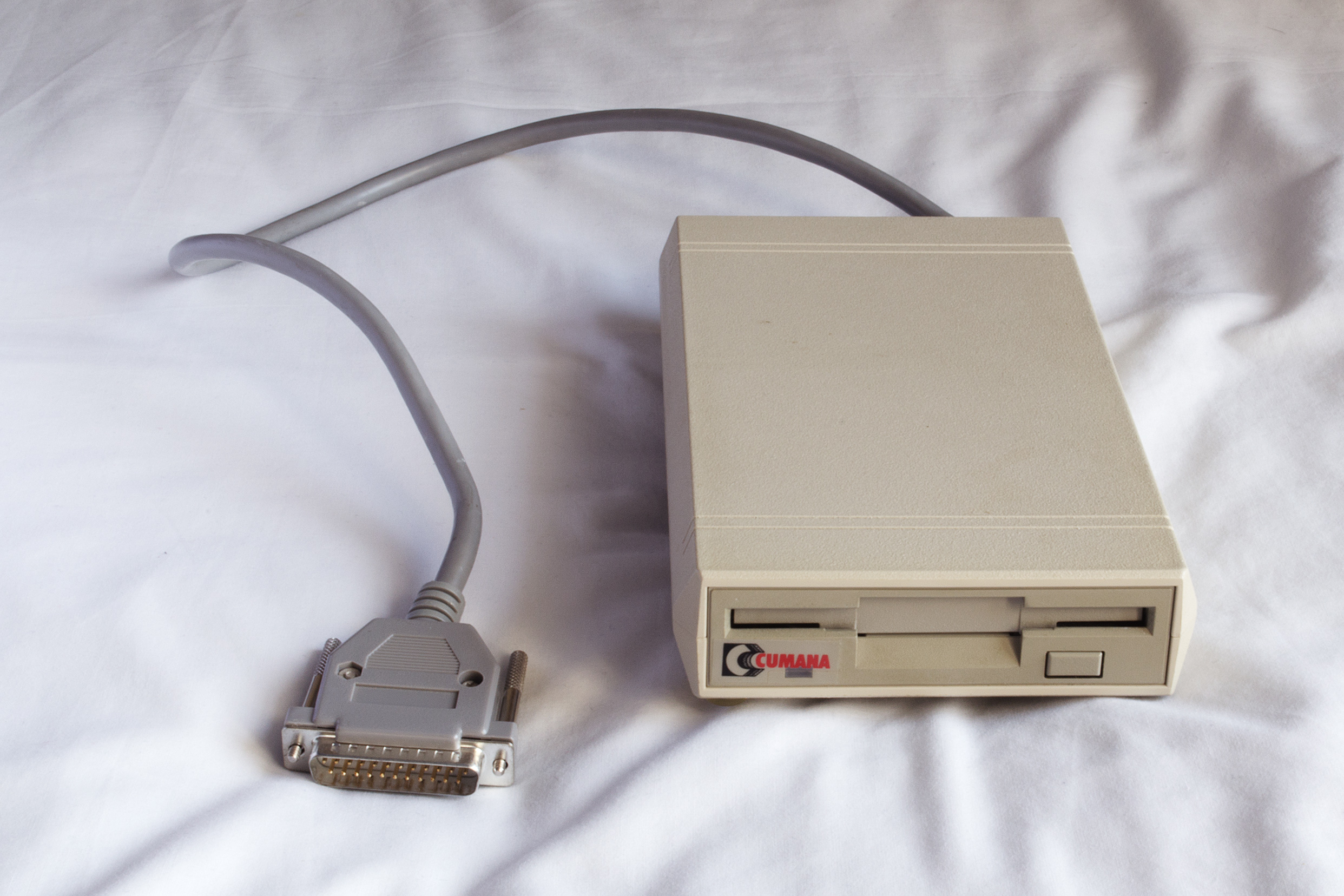
Cumana floppy disk drive for the Amiga

Cumana, based in Guildford, England, was a manufacturer of computer peripherals including disc drives for Acorn, BBC Micro, Amiga, and Oric computers.

Cumana entered receivership in 1995, eventually emerging from receivership at the end of 1995 through the acquisition of the company's designs and brand name by Economatics, who did not take on any of the company's liabilities or pre-receivership obligations with regard to orders or guarantees, although the new owner indicated a willingness to honour warranties. Five employees from Cumana joined Economatics in the transaction. Cumana's electronics assembly facilities were acquired by Kenure Developments Ltd (KDL). Cumana was subsequently acquired from Economatics by educational hardware and software supplier Cannon Computing in late 1997.
