= Flash drive =

Computer storage device

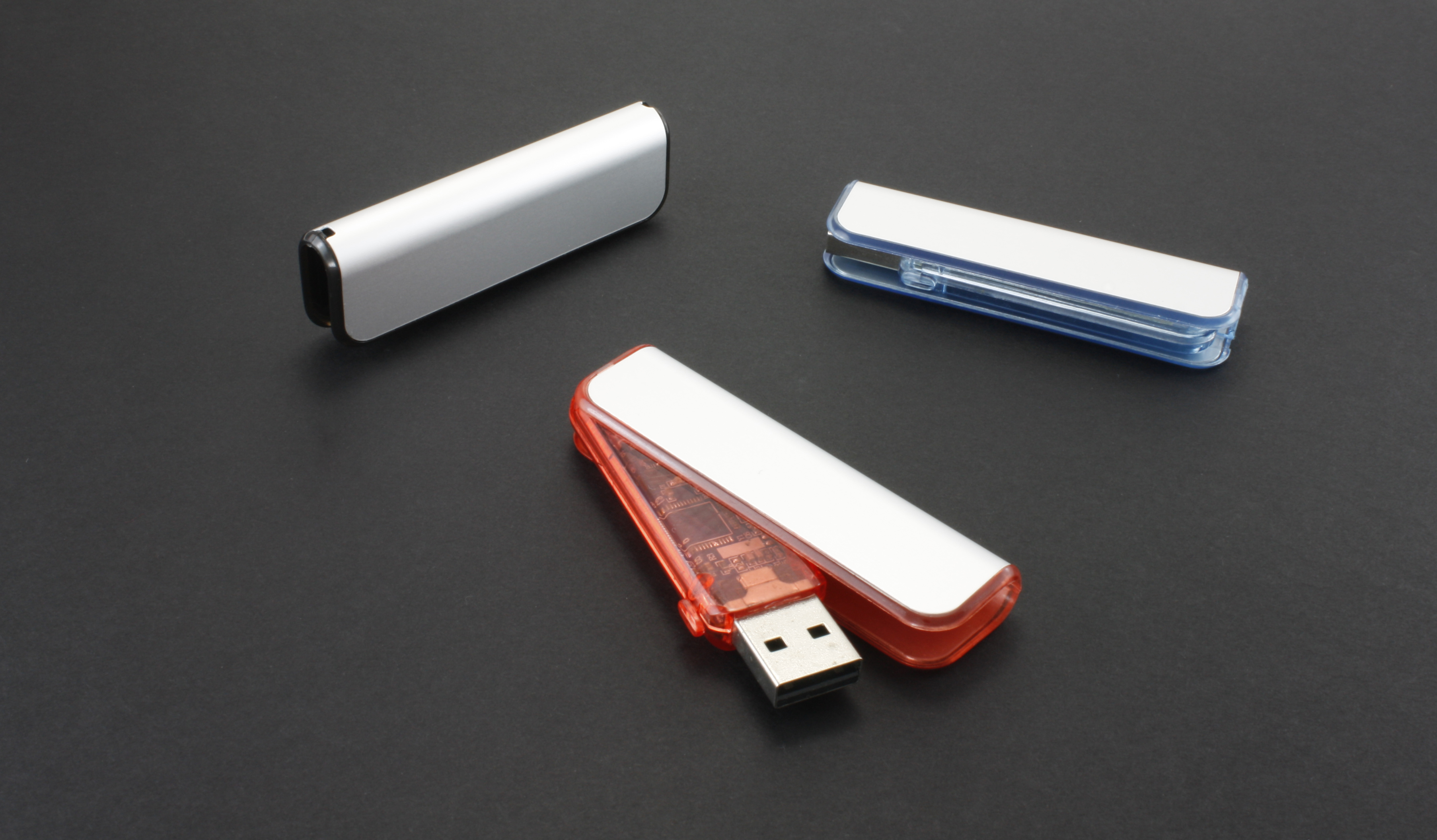
An assortment of flash drives

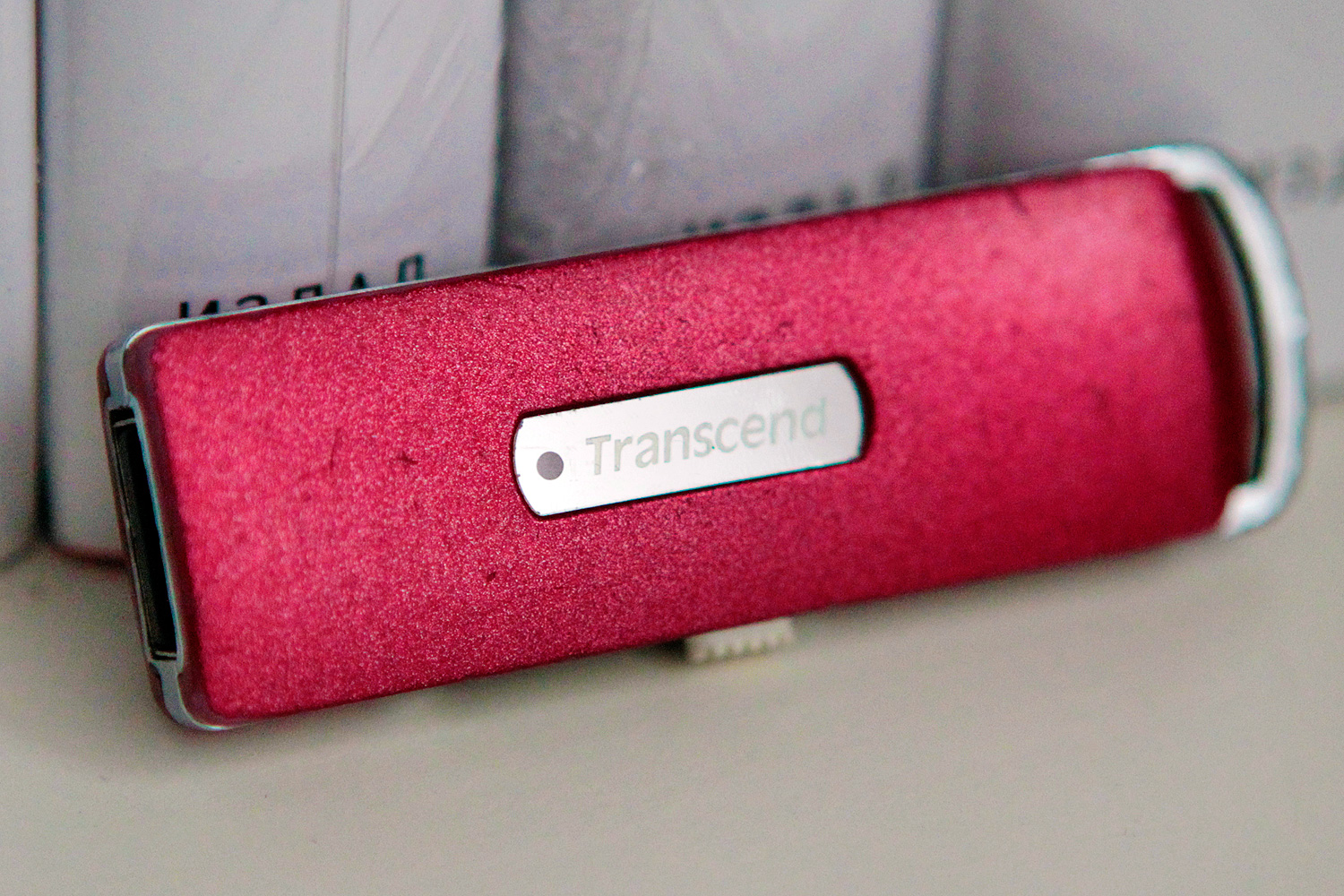
Transcend JetFlash from 2014

A flash drive is a portable computer drive that uses flash memory. Flash drives are the larger memory modules consisting of a number of flash chips. A flash chip is used to read the contents of a single cell, but it can write an entire block of cells. They connect to a USB port and function as a folder. They can also be encrypted for extra security.

== Specific flash drive types ==
Memory cards:

- Flash memory-based CompactFlash (CF) card (including CFast card) and XQD card (Note: some other types of CF and XQD card are not flash memory-based)
- Memory Stick (MS)
- MultiMediaCard (MMC)
- Secure Digital card (SD, SDHC, SDXC)
- SmartMedia card (SM)
- xD-Picture Card (xD)

Other:

- Solid-state drive, SSD, using flash memory (a few SSDs use DRAM or MRAM)
- USB flash drive (UFD)

== See also ==
- Flash memory
- Comparison of memory cards
