= Comparison of memory cards =

This table provides summary of comparison of various flash memory cards, as of 2025. Of memory cards (i.e. intended as such, to use e.g. internally), SD cards allow for largest capacity by far (with SDUC variant up to 4 TB max. currently available, and the spec allows up to 128 max.), though the much bulkier CFexpress cards can also match the capacity. The relatively large (external) USB flash drives allow for more capacity, and are available with 8 TB.

== Common information ==
Unless otherwise indicated, all images are to scale.

Card family	Standards organizations	Varieties	Entry date	Maximum commercially available capacity	Picture	Main features
CompactFlash	SanDisk	I	1994	512 GB (CF5 128*2^{50} bytes)		Thinner (3.3 mm), flash only, now up to 512 GB, although standard goes up to 128 PB since CF 5.0
CompactFlash	SanDisk	II	1994	512 GB (CF5 128*2^{50} bytes)		Thicker (5.0 mm), older flash, but usually Microdrives, up to 128 PiB
CompactFlash	SanDisk	–	1994	512 GB (CF5 128*2^{50} bytes)		ATA and PC Card-compatible
CFexpress	CompactFlash Association	1.0	2017	1 TB		CFexpress Type B: XQD form factor (38.5 mm × 29.8 mm × 3.8 mm), PCIe 3.0 x2 (1.97 GB/s), NVMe
CFexpress	CompactFlash Association	2.0	2019	4 TB		CFexpress Type A: 20 mm × 28 mm × 2.8 mm, PCIe 3.0 x1 (1.0 GB/s), NVMe CFexpress Type C: 54 mm × 74 mm × 4.8 mm, PCIe 3.0 x4 (4.0 GB/s), NVMe
CFexpress	CompactFlash Association	–	–	–	–	PCIe 3.0 x8 (8.0 GB/s), NVMe
MultiMediaCard	Siemens AG, SanDisk	MMC	1997	16 GB		Slim and small (24 mm × 32 mm × 1.4 mm), up to 16 GB
MultiMediaCard	Siemens AG, SanDisk	RS-MMC/MMC Mobile	2003/2005	16 GB		Compact (24 mm × 18 mm × 1.4 mm), up to 16 GB
MultiMediaCard	Siemens AG, SanDisk	MMCplus	2005	16 GB		Compact (24 mm × 32 mm × 1.4 mm), swifter, optional DRM, up to 16 GB
MultiMediaCard	Siemens AG, SanDisk	MMCmicro	2005	4 GB		Subcompact (14 mm × 12 mm × 1.1 mm), optional DRM, 16 MB to 4 GB
Nano Memory	proprietary (from Huawei)		2018	512 GB		Subcompact (12.3 mm × 8.8 mm × 0.7) smallest dimensions as of 2024. Can use Nano-SIM slots.
Secure Digital	SanDisk, Panasonic, Toshiba, Kodak, SD Association	SD	1999	2 GB		Small (32 mm × 24 mm × 2.1 mm), DRM, up to 2 GB. (2 GB cards use larger block sizes and may not be compatible with some host devices. See Article)
Secure Digital	SanDisk, Panasonic, Toshiba, Kodak, SD Association	miniSD	2003	2 GB		Compact (15 mm × 11 mm × 1 mm), DRM, up to 2 GB. (2 GB cards use larger block sizes and may not be compatible with some host devices. See Article)
Secure Digital	SanDisk, Panasonic, Toshiba, Kodak, SD Association	microSD	2005	2 GB	MicroSD card	Subcompact (15 mm × 11 mm × 1 mm), DRM, up to 2 GB. (2 GB cards use larger block sizes and may not be compatible with some host devices. See Article)
Secure Digital	SanDisk, Panasonic, Toshiba, Kodak, SD Association	SDHC	2006	32 GB		Same build as SD but greater capacity and transfer speed, 4 GB to 32 GB (not compatible with older host devices).
Secure Digital	SanDisk, Panasonic, Toshiba, Kodak, SD Association	miniSDHC	2008	32 GB		Same build as miniSD but greater capacity and transfer speed, 4 GB to 32 GB. 8 GB is largest in early-2011 (not compatible with older host devices).
Secure Digital	SanDisk, Panasonic, Toshiba, Kodak, SD Association	microSDHC	2007	32 GB		Same build as microSD but greater capacity and transfer speed, 4 GB to 32 GB. (not compatible with older host devices)
Secure Digital	SanDisk, Panasonic, Toshiba, Kodak, SD Association	SDXC	2009	1 TB		Same build as SD/SDHC, but greater capacity and transfer speed, 32 GB and higher. Standard goes up to 2 TB (not compatible with older host devices).
Secure Digital	SanDisk, Panasonic, Toshiba, Kodak, SD Association	microSDXC	2009	2 TB		Same build as microSD/microSDHC, but greater capacity and transfer speed, 32 GB and higher. Standard goes up to 2 TB (not compatible with older host devices).
Secure Digital	SanDisk, Panasonic, Toshiba, Kodak, SD Association	SDUC	2011	4 TB		Same build as SD/SDHC/SDXC, but greater capacity and transfer speed. Standard goes up to 128 TB (not compatible with older host devices).
SmartMedia	Toshiba	3.3/5 V	1995	128 MB		Very slim (45.0 mm × 37.0 mm × 0.76 mm), no wear leveling/FTL controller, up to 128 MB. This particular example shows the write protect sticker (the silver disc).
Memory Stick	Sony, SanDisk	Standard	1998	128 MB		Slim and narrow (50 mm × 21.5 mm × 2.8 mm), optional DRM, up to 128 MB
Memory Stick	Sony, SanDisk	PRO	2003	4 GB	(not to scale)	Slim and narrow (50 mm × 21.5 mm × 2.8 mm), swifter, optional DRM, up to 4 GB
Memory Stick	Sony, SanDisk	Duo	2003	128 MB		Compact (31 mm × 20 mm × 1.6 mm), optional DRM, up to 128 MB
Memory Stick	Sony, SanDisk	PRO Duo	2002–2006	32 GB		Compact (31 mm × 20 mm × 1.6 mm), optional DRM, up to 32 GB
Memory Stick	Sony, SanDisk	PRO-HG Duo	2007–2008	32 GB		Compact (31 mm × 20 mm × 1.6 mm), swifter, optional DRM, up to 32 GB
Memory Stick	Sony, SanDisk	Micro (M2)	2006	16 GB		Subcompact (15 mm × 12.5 mm × 1.2 mm), optional DRM, up to 16 GB
Memory Stick	Sony	PS Vita Memory Card	2012	64 GB		Subcompact (15 mm × 12.5 mm × 1.6 mm), compulsory DRM, up to 64 GB, proprietary (can be used on PS Vita only)
P2 (storage media)	Panasonic	P2	2004	64 GB		PC card containing several SD cards grouped together by a LSI Corporation RAID card
P2 (storage media)	Panasonic	MicroP2	2012	64 GB		MicroP2 is an ordinary SDXC/SDHC card conforming to UHS-II (Ultra High Speed bus), and can be read by common SDHC/SDXC card readers.
xD	Olympus, Fujifilm, Sony	Standard	2002–2007	512 MB		Slim and small (20 mm × 25 mm × 1.78 mm), electrically identical to SmartMedia, no wear-leveling controller, up to 512 MB
xD	Olympus, Fujifilm, Sony	Type M	2005	2 GB		Slim and small (20 mm × 25 mm × 1.78 mm) but slower read/write, no wear-leveling controller, up to 2 GB
xD	Olympus, Fujifilm, Sony	Type H	2005	2 GB		Slim and small (20 mm × 25 mm × 1.78 mm) and swifter, no wear-leveling controller, up to 2 GB
XQD card	Sony & Nikon	Standard	2010	240 GB		High-capacity, high-speed standard using PCIe as interface. Claimed max. allowed in spec is 2 TB (or over, but no product has come close to that).
Universal Flash Storage Card Extensions	Samsung	UFS Card	2016	>256 GB		Packages the flash memory, currently soldered in shipping smartphones, into a removable card form factor. Uses the SCSI command set including queuing. The electrical interface makes use of differential signaling, which enables high bus speeds and robustness under noisy conditions and reduced pin count (compared to parallel bus alternatives such as UHS-I).
USB flash drive	Various	USB 1.1/2.0/3.0/3.1	2000/2001	8 TB	(not to scale)	Universally compatible across most non-mobile computer platforms, their greater size suits them better to file transfer/storage instead of use in portable devices

== Physical details ==
Note that a memory card's dimensions are determined while holding the card with contact pins upwards. The length of cards is often greater than their width. Most cards show a directional arrow to aid insertion; such an arrow should be upward.

Card	Width (mm)	Length (mm)	Thickness (mm)	Volume (mm³)	Mass (g)
CompactFlash, Type I	43.0	36.0	3.3	5,108	3.3
CompactFlash, Type II	43.0	36.0	5.0	7,740	
SmartMedia	37.0	45.0	0.76	1,265	2.0
MMC, MMCplus	24.0	32.0	1.4	1,075	1.3
RS-MMC, MMCmobile	24.0	18.0	1.4	605	1.3
MMCmicro	14.0	12.0	1.1	185	
SD, SDHC, SDXC, SDIO, MicroP2	24.0	32.0	2.1	1,613	2.0
miniSD, miniSDHC, miniSDIO	20.0	21.5	1.4	602	1.0
microSD, microSDHC, microSDXC	11.0	15.0	1.0	165	0.27
Memory Stick Standard, PRO	21.5	50.0	2.8	3,010	4.0
Memory Stick Duo, PRO Duo, PRO-HG, XC	20.0	31.0	1.6	992	2.0
Memory Stick Micro (M2), XC	12.5	15.0	1.2	225	2.0
Nano Memory	12.3	8.8	0.7	76	
PS Vita Memory Card	15	12.5	1.6	300	0.6
XQD card	38.5	29.8	3.8	4,360	
xD	25.0	20.0	1.78	890	2.8
USB	varies	varies	varies	varies	varies

== Speed comparison ==
Standard	SD				UFS Card		CFast		XQD		CFexpress	
Version	3.0	4.0	6.0	7.0	1.0/1.1	3.0	1.0	2.0	1.0	2.0	1.0	?
Launched	2010 Q2	2011 Q1	2017 Q1	?	2016 Q2 / 2018 Q1	2020 Q4	2008 Q3	2012 Q3	2011 Q4	2014 Q1	2017 Q2	?
Bus	UHS-I	UHS-II	UHS-III	PCIe	UFS 2.0	UFS 3.0	SATA-300	SATA-600	PCIe 2.0 x1	PCIe 2.0 x2	PCIe 3.0 x2	PCIe 3.0 x8
Speed (full-duplex)	104 MB/s	156 MB/s	624 MB/s	1970 MB/s (?)	600 MB/s	1200 MB/s	300 MB/s	600 MB/s	500 MB/s	1000 MB/s	1970 MB/s	7880 MB/s

== Technical details ==
Card	Varieties	Max storage capacity (nom. in GiB)	Theoretical max. capacity (nom. in GiB)	Max read speed (MB/s)	Max write speed (MB/s)	Read-write cycles	Low-level access	Operating voltage (V)	Controller chip	# of pins
CompactFlash	I	512	128 PiB (134,217,728 GiB)	167	167		NOR/NAND	3.3 and 5	Yes	50
CompactFlash	II	12	128 PiB (134,217,728 GiB)	167	167		NOR/NAND	3.3 and 5	Yes	50
SmartMedia		128 MiB (0.125 GiB)		2		1,000,000	NAND	3.3 or 5	No	22
MMC	MMC	8	128	2	2	1,000,000	NAND	3.3	Yes	7
MMC	RS-MMC	2	128	2	2	1,000,000	NAND	3.3	Yes	7
MMC	MMCmobile	2	128	15	8	1,000,000	NAND	1.8 and 3.3	Yes	13
MMC	MMCplus	4	128	52	52	1,000,000	NAND	3.3	Yes	13
MMC	MMCmicro	2	128			1,000,000	NAND	1.8 and 3.3	Yes	10
MMC	eMMC		2 TiB (2048 GiB)	104	104		NAND	1.8 and 3.3	Yes	Varies
Secure Digital	SD (SDSC)	512	4	25	25		NAND	3.3	Yes	9
Secure Digital	miniSD	8	4	25	25		NAND	3.3	Yes	11
Secure Digital	microSD	4	4	25	25		NAND	3.3	Yes	8
Secure Digital	SDHC	32	32	104 (UHS-I)	104 (UHS-I)		NAND	1.8 and 3.3	Yes	9
Secure Digital	miniSDHC	4	32	104 (UHS-I)	104 (UHS-I)		NAND	1.8 and 3.3	Yes	11
Secure Digital	microSDHC	32	32	104 (UHS-I)	104 (UHS-I)		NAND	1.8 and 3.3	Yes	8
Secure Digital	SDXC	512	2 TiB (2048 GiB)	104 (UHS-I)	104		NAND	2.7–3.6	Yes	9
Secure Digital	microSDXC	1 TiB	2 TiB (2048 GiB)	104 (UHS-I)	104 (UHS-I)		NAND	2.7–3.6	Yes	8
Memory Stick	Standard	128 MiB (0.125 GiB)	128 MiB (0.125 GiB)	2.5	1.8		NAND	3.3	Yes	10
Memory Stick	PRO	4	2 TiB (2048 GiB)	20	20		NAND	3.3	Yes	10
Memory Stick	PRO Duo	32	2 TiB (2048 GiB)	20	20		NAND	3.3	Yes	10
Memory Stick	PRO-HG Duo	32	2 TiB (2048 GiB)	30 (actual; theoretical: 60)	30 (actual; theoretical: 60)		NAND	3.3	Yes	10
Memory Stick	Micro (M2)	16	32	20	20		NAND	1.8 and 3.3	Yes	10
Memory Stick	xC		2 TiB (2048 GiB)	60	60		NAND	3.3	Yes	10
xD		512 MiB (0.5 GiB)	512 MiB (0.5 GiB)	5	3		NAND	3.3	No	18
xD	Type M	2	8	4	2.5		NAND	3.3	No	18
xD	Type H	2	8	5	4		NAND	3.3	No	18
xD	Type M+	2	8	6	3.75		NAND	3.3	No	18
XQD		64	2+ TiB (2+ GiB)	168	168		NAND	5		
USB	Full speed (USB 1)	2048 (2 TiB)	No hardware limit	1	1		NAND	5	Yes	4
USB	High speed (USB 2.0)	2048 (2 TiB)	No hardware limit	40	40		NAND	5	Yes	4
USB	Super speed (USB 3.0)	2048 (2 TiB)	No hardware limit	240	160		NAND	5	Yes	4

== Consumer details ==
Card	Write protection switch	DRM
CompactFlash	No	No
SmartMedia	Partial, sticker	Partial (optional)
MMC, RS-MMC	No	No
MMCMobile	No	Yes, secureMMC
SD	Yes	Yes, CPRM
miniSD	No	Yes, CPRM
microSD	No	Yes, CPRM
Memory Stick Standard, PRO	Yes	Optional, MagicGate
Memory Stick Duo, PRO Duo	No	Optional, MagicGate
Memory Stick PRO-HG Duo	No	Optional, MagicGate
Memory Stick Micro (M2)	No	Optional, MagicGate
PS Vita Memory Card	No	Yes, Proprietary
xD	No	Partial
USB	Sometimes	No

== Compatibility ==
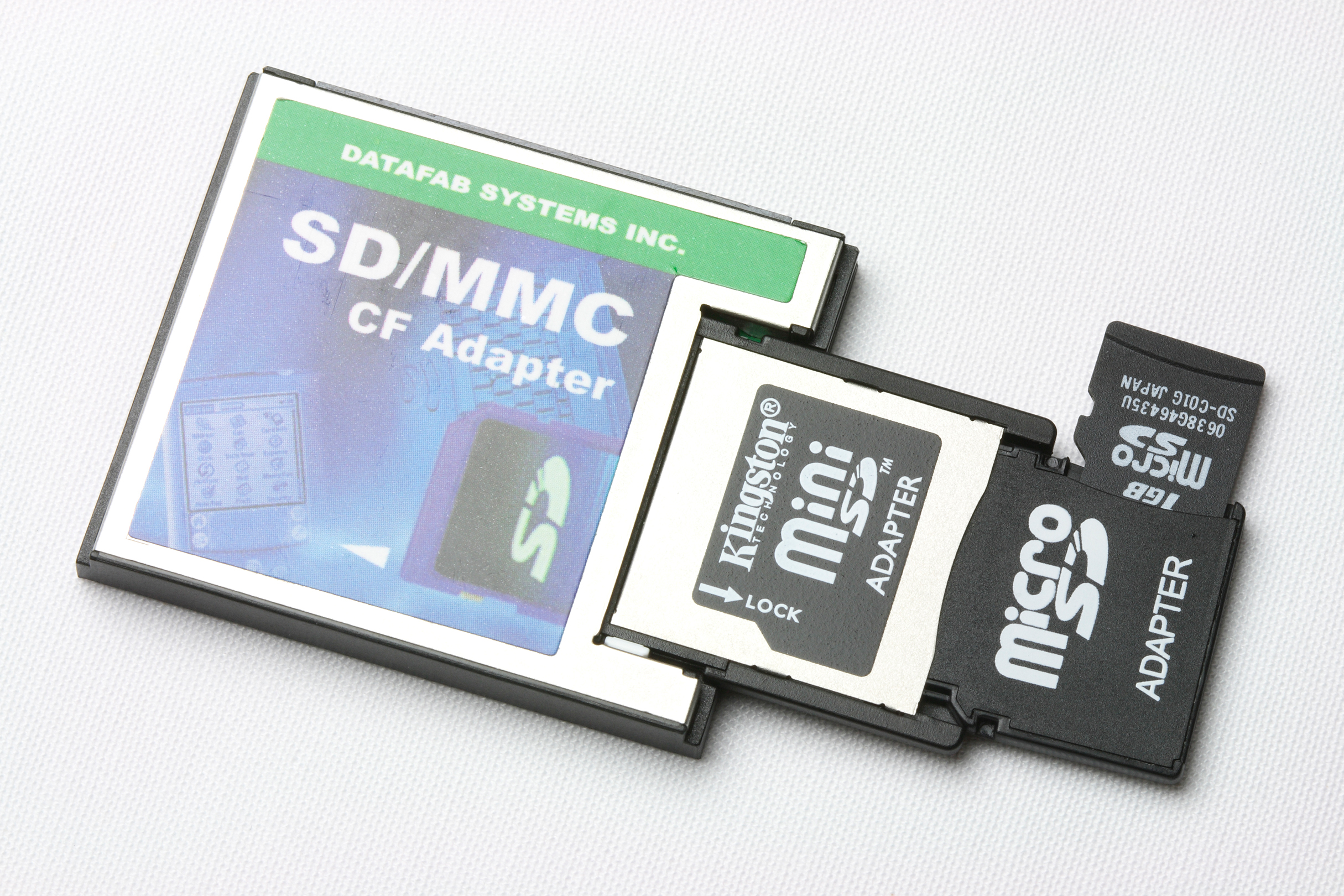
Chain of adapters: microSD→miniSD→SD→CF

The following chart gives details on availability of adapters to put a given card (horizontal) in a given slot or device (vertical). This table does not take into account protocol issues in communicating with the device.

Following labels are used:

- + (native) – A slot is native for such card.
- D (Directly compatible) – A card may be used in such a slot directly, without any adapters. Best possible compatibility.
- M (requires a Mechanical adapter) – Such adapter is only a physical enclosure to fit one card sized into another; all electrical pins are exactly the same.
- EM (requires an Electro-Mechanical adapter) – Such adapter features both physical enclosure and pins re-routing as terminals are sufficiently different. No powered elements in such adapter exists, thus they're very cheap and easy to manufacture and may be supplied as a bonus for every such card.
- E (requires an Electronic adapter enclosure) – These adapters must have components—potentially requiring external power—that transform signals, as well as physical enclosure and pin routing.
- X (requires an eXternal adapter) – Technically the same as E, but such adapter usually consists of 2 parts: a pseudo-card with pin routing and physical enclosure size that perfectly match the target slot and a break-out box (a card reader) that holds a real card. Such adapter is the least comfortable to use.
- XM (requires an eXternal electro-mechanical adapter) – Technically the same as EM, but such adapter usually consists of 2 parts: a pseudo-card with pin routing and physical enclosure size that perfectly match the target slot and a break-out box (a card reader) that holds a real card. Such adapter is the least comfortable to use.
- Empty cell – Card cannot be used in such slot, no single adapter is known to exist. Sometimes a chain of adapters can help (for example, miniSD→CF as miniSD→SD→CF).

Card Slot	CF		CFast	SM	MMC		Memory Stick				SDSC			SDHC			SDXC		xD			XQD
Card Slot	I	II			MMC	RS-MMC, MMCmobile	Std	PRO	PRO Duo	Micro	SDSC	miniSD	microSD	SDHC	miniSDHC	microSDHC	SDXC	microSDXC	Std	M	H	
ExpressCard	E	E			E		E	E	E		E	E	E						E	E	E	EM
PCI Express Mini Card																						EM
mSATA			XM																			
PC Card	EM	EM		E	E		E	E			E											
PCMCIA	EM	EM		E	E		E	E			E											
CF I	+	+		E	E		E	E	E		E								E	E	E	
CF II		+		E	E		E	E			E								E	E	E	
CFast			+																			
SM				+															X	X	X	
xD													E						+	+	+	
XQD																						+
MMC					+	M					D											
MS					X		+	+	M	M	X	X	E									
SDSC					D	M					+	EM	EM									
miniSD												+	EM									
microSD													+									
SDHC											D	EM	EM	+	EM	EM						
miniSDHC												D	EM		+	EM						
microSDHC													D			+						
SDXC		uscb									D	EM	EM	D	EM	EM	+	EM				
microSDXC													D			D		+				
IDE PATA	EM	EM									E											
Serial ATA	E	E	EM																			
PCI Express																						EM
USB	X	X		X	X		X	X	E	E	E		E						X	X	X	X
Floppy				E	E	E + M	E	E														
Nintendo DS Slot-1													E									
Nintendo DS Slot-2	E	E + X									E	E	E									
Gamecube Memory Card											E	E	E									
