= Military Family Voices =

US nonprofit organization

Military Family Voices (MFV) is a federally registered charitable non-governmental organization (NGO), in the United States. Its mission is to audio record, "preserve, the voices of the United States Armed Forces' current and former Military Members and their families to make it possible for them to self-cope using the healing, centering and bonding power of their loved ones' voices to mitigate and to pre-empt the extreme stresses "they endure as a result of the separations and brutal harms' way of their Military lives".

The initial pilot program for all United States Military Branches is at Fort Carson Mountain Army Post in Colorado.

Military Family Voices
Slogan	"Need A Voice - Give a Voice - Get a Voice"
Web Site	www.militaryfamilyvoices.org
Founded	2004
Founder	William D. Kuenning
Type	non-governmental organization (NGO)
Focus	Current/Veteran Military & Family Wellness
Unique	Yes
Preemptive	Yes
Good Standing	Yes
Main Location	Colorado
Program Services	Audio Recording
Mobile Recording	Yes
Local Recording	Yes
National Recording	Yes
World Recording	Yes
No Charge Services	Yes
Volunteers	Yes
Employees	Yes

This Charity's Purposed Activities: Military Family Voices, MFV, makes it possible for present and former Military Members and their families to use these sound recordings for comfort, whenever they need reassurance from those familiar voices of those they love. Soldiers carry these recordings with them downrange. Families cherish the recordings as helpful memory triggers, and people's lives are captured in small audio snapshots of their voices, as for instance while children grow up and their voices change month-to-month and year-to-year.

Military Family Voices is mobile and can deploy for recording to virtually any location. MFV has mobile coaches/buses and trailers, which serve as recording studios to record in the field.

Because many military families do not live together in the same community and cannot be in the same recording session in the same location at the same time, MFV has the capability to call out by phone to their relatives and loved ones, wherever they are in the world and place their voices on the voice preservation recordings as well. Their loved ones can also call in by appointment to preserve their voices from wherever they happen to be. Whereas, MFV can call to anywhere in the world, most calls in and out for recordings primarily involve these locations: Iraq, Afghanistan, Korea, Africa, Germany, England, Mexico, United States.

When the recording sessions are finished, those who recorded are usually given their recordings right away in various forms like: Compact Disc or flash drive or other digital media.

In 2012, Military Family Voices was voted and judged "The Best New Charity in the Western Region in the National and International Classy Awards."
