= Varicam =

Panasonic video camera

Panasonic Varicam
- Type: Video camera
- Inception: 2001
- Manufacturer: Panasonic
- Website: pro-av.panasonic.net/en/cinema_camera_varicam_eva/index.html

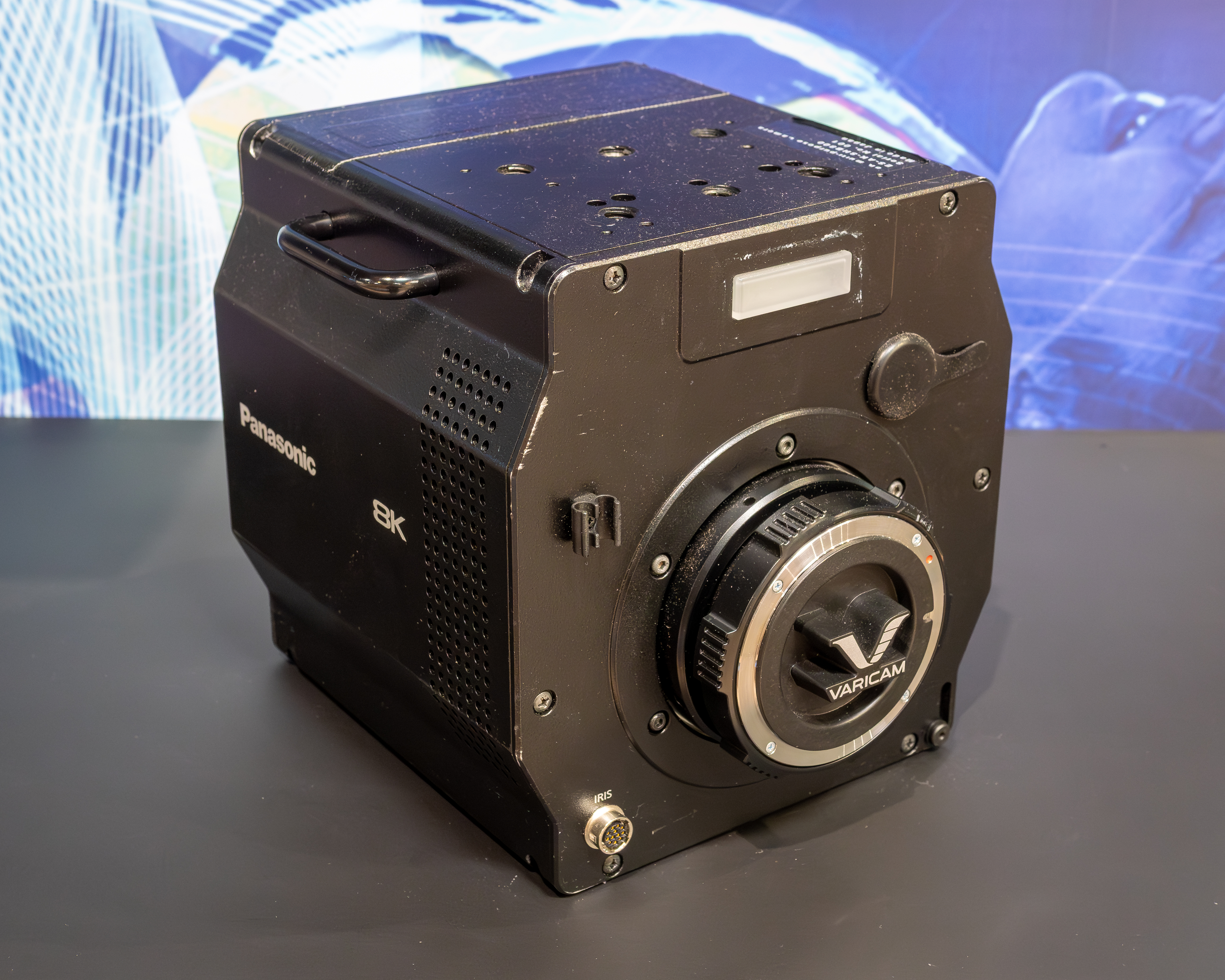
8K Varicam AK-SHB810

Varicam, originally stylized as VariCam, is a brand name associated with specialized Panasonic video cameras that are mostly used to imitate the look and feel of motion picture cameras. They have been used to record scenes for many feature films. The recording framerate of Varicam cameras can be varied between at least 1 to 60 frames per second, offering flexibility in creating rapid or slow motion effects. Because film has traditionally been shot at 24 frames per second, while NTSC video uses 29.97 frames per second, Varicams can be used for both high end video and film production. Panasonic applied the VariCam brand for the first time to the AJ-HDC27.

Although the initial capital costs of the cameras are high, their low operating cost has made them popular among independent filmmakers, and they are often available to rent from camera rental companies. The Varicam range has now matured into its latest generation, and is widely used in TV production, as well as film.

== Range ==
Panasonic VariCam model summary
Model	Weight	Size (Note: Width × Height × Depth, excluding lenses and protrusions)	Sensor	Lens mount	Media	Framerates	Introduced	Current
HDC27V/F (Note: Panasonic model numbers sometimes contain the suffix E or P. E designates models sold in Europe, and P designates professional models, so the HDC27FP is equivalent to the HDC27F, and is intended for NTSC regions, while the HDC27FE would be limited to 50 frames per second, corresponding to the PAL video standard.)	9.9 lb 4.5 kg	5 1/4 in × 8 1/16 in × 13 in 133 mm × 205 mm × 330 mm	3×2/3"	B4	1/4" DVCPRO	4–60 (720p)	2001	No No
HDC27H	10 lb 4.7 kg	5 1/4 in × 8 1/16 in × 12 3/8 in 133 mm × 205 mm × 314 mm	3×2/3"	B4	1/4" DVCPRO	4–60 (720p)	2005	No No
HPX2700	11 lb 4.9 kg	5 7/16 in × 8 1/4 in × 12 9/16 in 138 mm × 210 mm × 319 mm	3×2/3"	B4	5×P2	1–60 (720p)	2008	No No
HPX3700	11 lb 4.9 kg	5 7/16 in × 8 1/4 in × 12 9/16 in 138 mm × 210 mm × 319 mm	3×2/3"	B4	5×P2	1–30 (1080p)	2008	No No
35	11.0 lb 5.0 kg	7 1/16 in × 9 3/32 in × 13 21/32 in 179 mm × 231 mm × 347 mm	1×Super 35	PL	(Note: Head only. When docked in the recording module AU-VREC1G, supports expressP2, P2, or microP2)	1–120 (4K)	2014	No No
HS	9.9 lb 4.5 kg	7 1/16 in × 9 1/16 in × 13 21/32 in 179 mm × 230 mm × 347 mm	3×2/3"	B4		1–240 (1080p)	2014	No No
LT	5.9 lb 2.7 kg	7 1/4 in × 9 1/8 in × 9 3/4 in 180 mm × 230 mm × 250 mm	1×Super 35	EF (PL optional)	1×expressP2	1–120 (4K)	2016	Yes Yes
PURE	11.0 lb 5.0 kg	5.7 in × 6.5 in × 10.3 in 144 mm × 165 mm × 262 mm	1×Super 35	PL	(Note: Camera outputs RAW data directly to computer. Panasonic have jointly developed the PURE with Codex Digital as the exclusive recording solution.)	1–120 (4K)	2016	No No
AK-PLV100	9.3 lb 4.2 kg	5 31/32 in × 10 17/32 in × 15 11/32 in 152 mm × 267 mm × 390 mm	1×5.7K Super 35	PL	No internal media (Note: SMPTE ST2110 video over IP)	Cinematic 24p/30, Standard Broadcast 60p	2022	Yes Yes

=== Logo ===
The VariCam logo was updated with the release of the 35 and HS in 2014. The new logo, colored silver, features a stylized capital letter "V", with the right half composed of blocks, intended to represent both frames of film and digital bits.In the original logo, the right half of the "V" was claw-shaped in homage to the intermittent mechanism used to advance film.

== History ==
Former logo, used until 2014

Panasonic announced the first generation VariCam, designated model number AJ-HDC27V (originally the AJ-HDC24A) on April 22, 2001. A similar camera had been introduced with a fixed 60 frames per second frame rate two months earlier. It recorded 720p video to DVCPRO tape at frame rates in integer increments between 4 and 60 frames per second. The BBC filmed the natural history series Planet Earth using HDC27FE Varicams. The second generation VariCam, the AJ-HDC27H, offered improved performance with the same basic features thanks to internal tweaks. The AJ-HDC27H was launched in 2005.

Panasonic launched two new Varicams, the AJ-HPX2700 and the AJ-HPX3700, in 2008. These new models feature Panasonic's P2 solid state media technology, representing a major advance for the VariCam line. The AJ-HPX3700 is the flagship model providing full potential 1080p capability and dual link HD-SDI output, while the HPX2700 offers more flexible frame rates at a reduced 720p resolution. NASA captured footage of a Space Shuttle Solid Rocket Booster recovery mission in 2011 using a HPX3700 in 1080p at 24 frames per second (fps).

In 2013, Panasonic announced the development of a 4K Varicam, with promised availability in 2014. On February 27, 2014, Panasonic announced the Varicam 35 (AU-V35C1), a camera that features a 4K CMOS Super 35-sized sensor capable of filming up to 120fps. It was announced alongside the Varicam HS (AU-V23HS1), a 3CMOS 2/3"-sensor camera capable of filming up to 240fps in Full HD. The Varicam 35 and HS are modular systems that can be separated into camera and recorder modules, with the 35 and HS sharing a common recorder, Panasonic model number AU-VREC1. The Varicam LT and PURE, introduced separately approximately six months apart in 2016, are both derived from the Varicam 35. The LT (AU-V35LT1G) is a more compact solution coupling the same sensor from the Varicam 35 with an integrated recorder (dropping the modular camera/recorder concept used in the 35 and HS), and the PURE, jointly developed with Codex Digital, uses the same camera section as the Varicam 35 (AU-V35C1G) but sends uncompressed RAW data to a computer with a newly developed recording module (AU-VCXRAW2).

== Shot with Varicam ==
Many films and television shows have been shot using Varicam, including:

- 13 Reasons Why (2017)
- Alex Strangelove (2018)
- Amy Schumer: Live at the Apollo (2015)
- Anne with an E (2017)
- Arrested Development (season 1,2 and 3; HDC27)
- Arrested Development (season 5, 2018; Varicam LT)
- Curb Your Enthusiasm (seasons 9 & 10; Varicam LT)
- Bad Santa 2 (2016)
- The Bay (2010)
- Better Call Saul (2015)
- Containment (2016)
- Crazy Rich Asians (2018)
- Death Note (2017)
- The Deuce (2017)
- Doctor Foster (2015)
- Fahrenheit 451 (2018)
- Freakish (2016)
- Frontier (2016)
- Guilt (2016)
- Gypsy (2017)
- Horace and Pete (2016)
- Ils sont partout (2016)
- Just Add Magic (2015)
- Kongens Nei (2016)
- Lady Dynamite (2016)
- Last Flag Flying (2017)
- Le Voyage de Fanny (2016)
- Legends & Lies (2015)
- The Letdown (2016)
- Love (2016)
- Making History (2017)
- Manhunt: Unabomber (2017)
- Master of None (2015)
- Mount Pleasant (2017)
- The OA (2016)
- Orange Is the New Black (2013; Varicam LT)
- Ozark (2017)
- Planet Earth (2006; HDC27)
- Ray Meets Helen (2017)
- Siesta Key (2017)
- Snowfall (2017)
- Step Up: High Water (2018)
- Sun Records (2017)
- Tatort: Zorn Gottes (2016)
- Une vie (2016)
- Kevin Hart: What Now? (2016)
- Wheeler Dealers (2017)

== See also ==
CineAlta, the line of Sony cameras that have the same working and visual goals as Varicam—to give a "film" look to video productions.
