= MicroP2 =

Memory card format

- Media type: Memory card
- Usage: Portable devices
- Extended to: Secure Digital (SD)

MicroP2 is a discontinued memory card format originally introduced by Panasonic.

The cards were announced in April 2012 and shipped in March 2013. Physically, MicroP2 is a SDXC/SDHC card conforming to UHS-II (Ultra High Speed bus), and can be read by common SDHC/SDXC card readers.

It can be used with P2 products using an adapter, though a firmware update is required to use the new media.

The first MicroP2 products from Panasonic shipped in April 2013. The production of MicroP2 cards was officially discontinued by Panasonic in 2020, with the company advising users to transition to SDXC memory cards for devices that previously supported MicroP2.
