= SmartMedia =

Memory card format

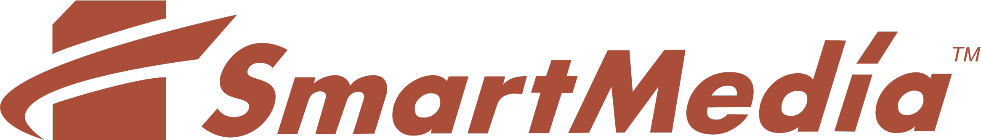

- Media type: Memory card
- Capacity: up to 128 MB
- Developed by: Toshiba
- Dimensions: 45.0 × 37.0 × 0.76 mm
- Weight: 1.8 g

SmartMedia is an obsolete flash memory card standard owned by Toshiba, with capacities ranging from 0.5 MB to 128 MB. The format mostly saw application in the early 2000s in digital cameras and audio production. SmartMedia memory cards are no longer manufactured.

== History ==
The SmartMedia format was launched in the summer of 1995 to compete with the MiniCard, CompactFlash, and PC Card formats. Although memory cards are nowadays associated with digital cameras, digital audio players, PDAs, and similar devices, SmartMedia was pitched as a successor to the computer floppy disk. Indeed, the format was originally named Solid State Floppy Disk Card (SSFDC), and the physical design resembles a miniature 3.5" floppy disk. The SSFDC forum, a consortium aiming to promote SSFDC as an industry standard, was founded in April 1996, consisting of 37 initial members.

The Japan-exclusive 1998 Nintendo 64 game Mario no Photopi had two SmartMedia slots integrated into its cartridge and could facilitate transfers between devices and cards, and was marketed as supporting Fujifilm's Digital Imaging Services for printing saved images. Ten SmartMedia cards pre-loaded with clip art and graphics were released for use with the game.

Some digital audio production equipment of the early 2000s relied on SmartMedia storage, such as the Yamaha QY100 Music Sequencer, Roland MC-09 "PhraseLab" synthesizer, Korg Electribe ES-1 and ES-1 MKII, Korg Triton LE workstation, and the Zoom PS-04 "Palmtop Studio".

SmartMedia was popular in digital cameras and reached its peak in about 2001, when it garnered nearly half of the digital-camera market. It was backed especially by Fujifilm and Olympus, though the format started to exhibit problems, as camera resolutions increased. Cards larger than 128 MB were not available, and the compact digital cameras were reaching a size where even SmartMedia cards were too big to be convenient. Eventually Toshiba switched to smaller, higher-capacity Secure Digital cards, and SmartMedia ceased to have major support after Olympus and Fujifilm both switched to xD. It did not find as much support in PDAs, MP3 players, or pagers as some other formats, especially in North America and Europe, though there was still significant use.

SmartMedia memory cards ceased manufacturing in the mid 2000s, with no new devices designed for SmartMedia since. As of 2026, Smartmedia cards are frequently available on eBay mostly in used condition, with new cards coming up from time to time.

== Structure ==
A SmartMedia card consists of a single NAND flash chip embedded in a thin plastic card, although some higher-capacity cards contain multiple linked chips. It was one of the smallest and thinnest of the early memory cards, only 0.76 mm thick, and managed to maintain a favorable cost ratio as compared to the others. SmartMedia cards lack a built-in controller chip, which kept the cost down. This feature later caused problems, since some older devices would require firmware updates to handle larger capacity cards. The lack of built-in controller also made it impossible for the card to perform automatic wear levelling, a process which prevents premature failure of any individual block by ensuring that write operations are evenly distributed across the whole device. If any wear levelling is desired, it needs to be performed by the device using the card.

== Use ==
SmartMedia cards can be used in a standard 3.5" floppy drive by means of a FlashPath adapter. This remains one of SmartMedia's most distinctive features. This method was not without its own disadvantages, as it required special drivers offering only very basic file read/write capability (or read-only on Macintosh systems) and was limited to floppy-disk transfer speeds. However, this was not so troublesome in the earlier days of the format, when card sizes were limited (generally 8–16 MB), and USB interfaces were both uncommon and low-speed, with digital cameras connecting by "high-speed" serial links that themselves needed drivers and special transfer programs. The 15 minutes taken to read a nearly full 16 MB card directly to hard disk by Flashpath using the slowest (128 kbit/s) PC floppy controller was still simpler and slightly faster than the quickest reliable (115.2 kbit/s) serial link, without the need for connection, syncing and thumbnail previewing, and only beaten by expensive parallel-port-based external card readers that could do the same job in 2 minutes or less (≳1000 kbit/s, comparable to USB 1.0) when connected to a compatible high-speed ECP or EPP port (and ~5 minutes using a basic PPT in failsafe mode).

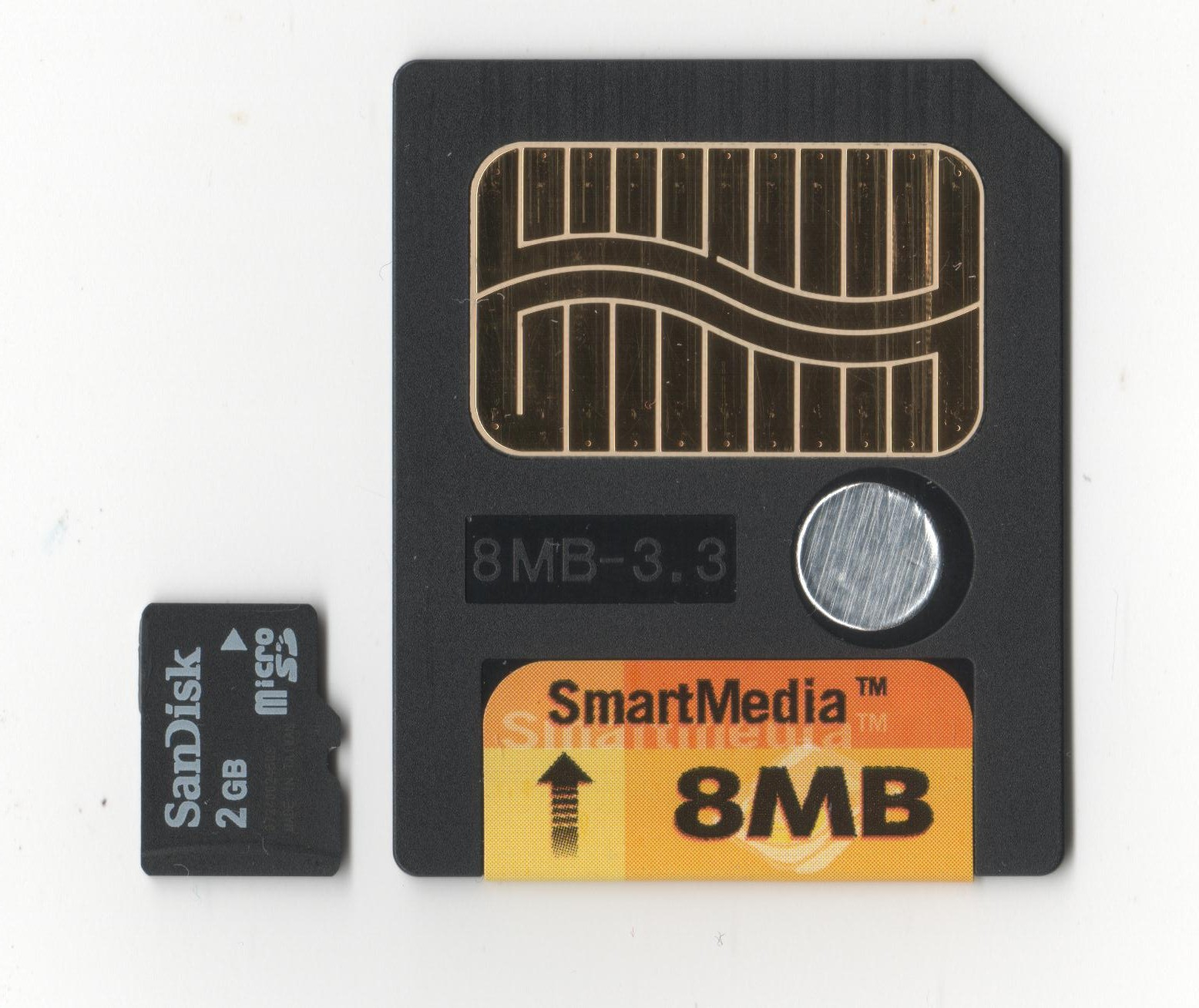
Comparison of a 2 GB microSD card and an 8 MB 3.3 V SmartMedia card

Typically, SmartMedia cards were used as storage for portable devices, in a form that could easily be removed for access by a PC. For example, pictures taken with a digital camera would be stored as image files on a SmartMedia card. A user could copy the images to a computer with a SmartMedia reader. A reader was typically a small box connected by USB or some other serial connection. Computers, both laptops and desktops, occasionally had SmartMedia slots built in until the mid-2000's, for instance the 2005 Toshiba Tecra A4. While availability of dedicated SmartMedia readers has dropped off, readers that read multiple card types (such as 4-in-1, 10-in-1) continued production, but even these have decreased in quantity over time, with many dropping SmartMedia in favour of microSD and/or Memory Stick Micro. As of August 2024 only legacy card readers remain in production.

== Properties ==
=== Capacity ===
SmartMedia cards larger than 128 MB were never released, although there were rumors of a 256 MB card being planned. Technical specifications for the memory size were released, and the 256 MB cards were even advertised in some places. Some older devices cannot support cards larger than 16 or sometimes 32 MB without a firmware update, if at all.

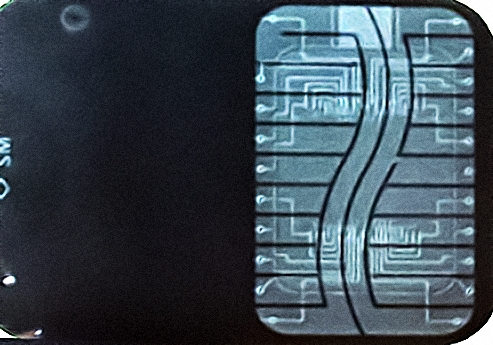
A radiograph of SmartMedia card

=== Voltages ===
SmartMedia cards came in two formats – 5 V and the more modern 3.3 V (sometimes marked 3 V) – named for their main supply voltages. The packaging was nearly identical, except for the reversed placement of the notched corner. Many older SmartMedia devices only support 5 V SmartMedia cards, whereas many newer devices only support 3.3 V cards. In order to protect 3.3 V cards from being damaged in 5 V-only devices, the card reader should have some mechanical provision (such as detecting the type of notch) to disallow insertion of an unsupported type of card. Some low-cost 5 V-only card readers do not operate this way, and inserting a 3.3 V card into such a 5 V-only reader will result in permanent damage to the card. Dual-voltage card readers are highly recommended.

=== Variant formats ===
There is an oversized xD-to-SmartMedia adapter that allows xD cards to use a SmartMedia port, but it does not fit entirely inside a SmartMedia slot. There is a limit on the capacity of the xD card when used in such adapters (sometimes 128 MB or 256 MB), and the device is subject to the restrictions of the SmartMedia reader as well. It has since been known from reverse engineering that an xD card is essentially a downsized SmartMedia card.

Defective SmartMedia cards are known to exist, either having missing pins or having the corner cut on the wrong side. SmartMedia cards were designed to have the top-right corner cut off (pin side up) but some were designed with the top left or bottom right cut off.

=== Copy protection ===
Many SmartMedia cards include a little-known copy-protection feature known as "ID". This is why many cards are marked with "ID" beside the capacity. This gave every card a unique identification number for use with copy-protection systems. One of the few implementations of this primitive DRM system was by the Korean company Game Park, which used it to protect commercial games for the GP32 handheld gaming system. Samsung's 1999 Yepp Hip-Hop MP3 player also used the feature in order to implement Secure Digital Music Initiative DRM.

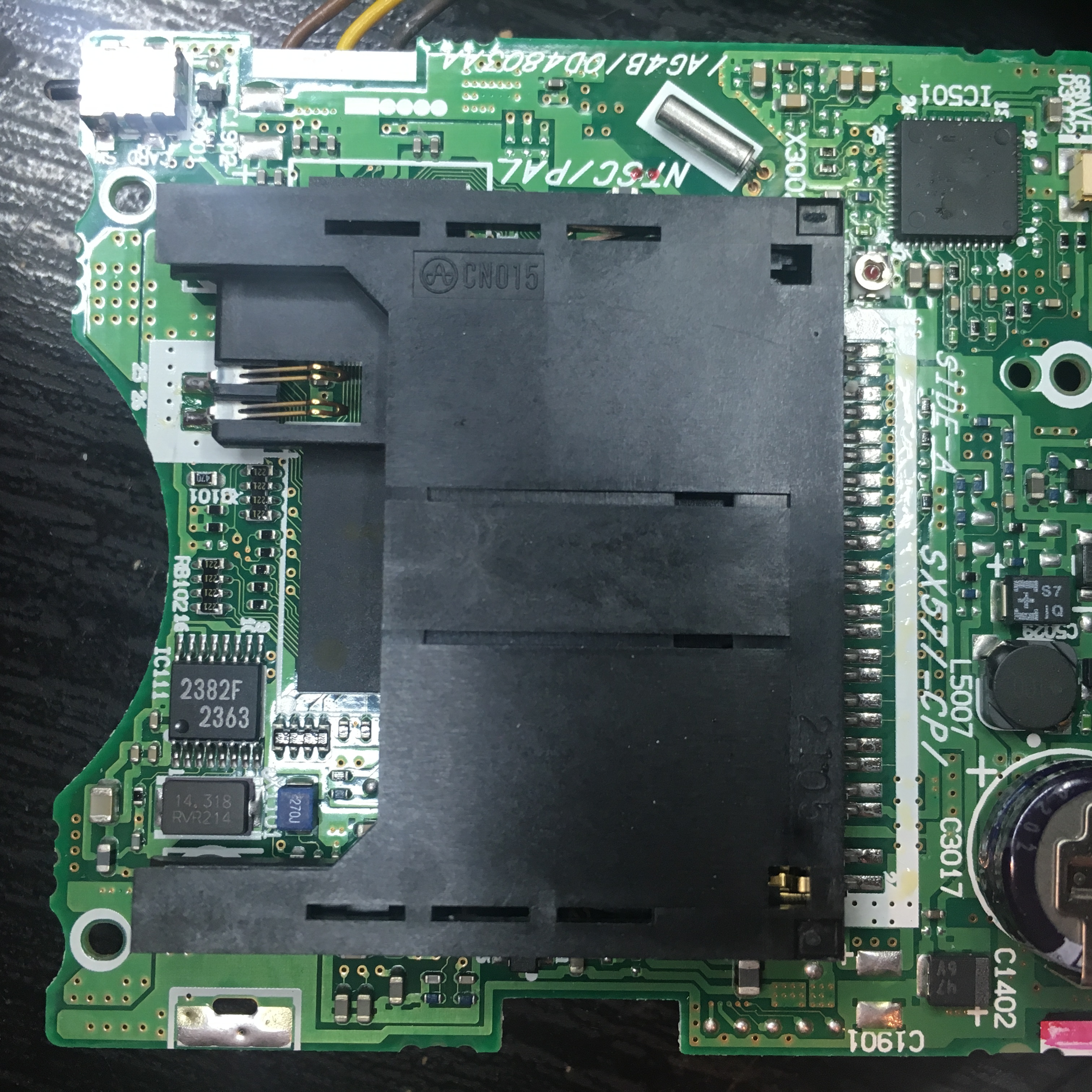
SmartMedia card slot on the PCB of a digital camera

=== Write protection ===
A small circle on one side of the SmartMedia card could be covered with a metallic sticker to make the card read-only unless or until the sticker was removed.

== Specifications ==
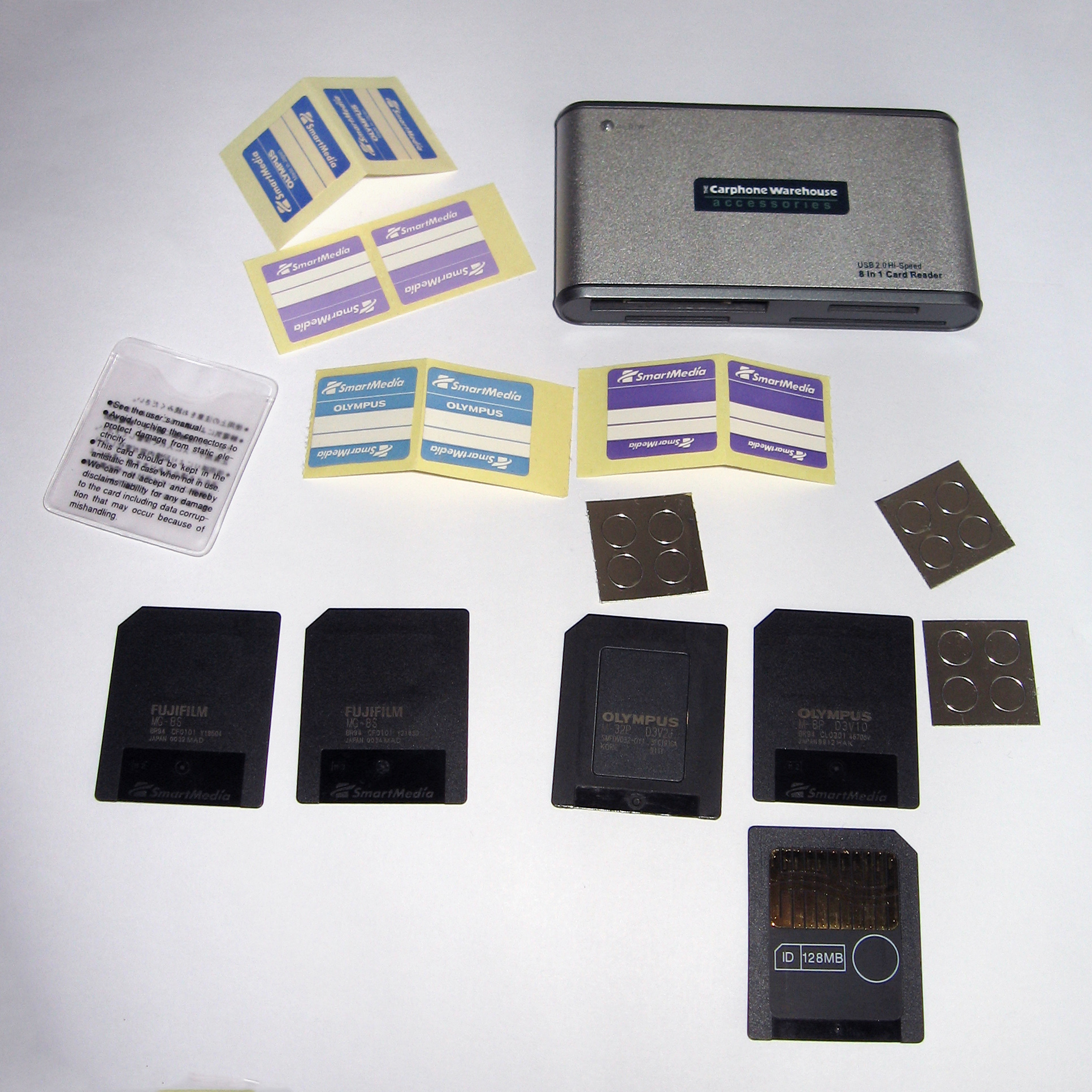
SmartMedia cards and accessories including labels, metallic write-protect stickers, sleeves and SmartMedia-compatible card reader

- Mass: 2 g (0.071 oz)
- Size: 45.0 mm × 37.0 mm × 0.76 mm (1.772 in × 1.457 in × 0.030 in)
- Capacities: 0.5, 1, 2, 4, 8, 16, 32, 64, 128 MB
- Uses 16-Mbit, 32-Mbit, and 64-Mbit Toshiba TC58-compatible NAND-type flash memory chips
- Flat electrode terminal with 22 pins, or 18 if omitting the non-connected ones — (32M & 64M compatible)
- 8-bit I/O interface (16-bit in some cases)
- Data transfer rate: 2 MB/s
- 1000000 write cycles
- 10 years storage time without power
- Metallic write-protect sticker
- Compatible with PCMCIA with an adapter
- Compatible with CompactFlash Type II with an adapter
- Compatible with 3.5" floppy drives using FlashPath adapter

Full technical specifications for the SmartMedia card could be requested from the SSFDC forum for free as of 2008. There is also a Linux driver for a SmartMedia card reader called "SDDR09", which describes details of the format such as how physical-to-logical translation is recorded on the chip.

== See also ==
- Comparison of memory cards
