= XD-Picture Card =

Memory card format

xD-Picture Card

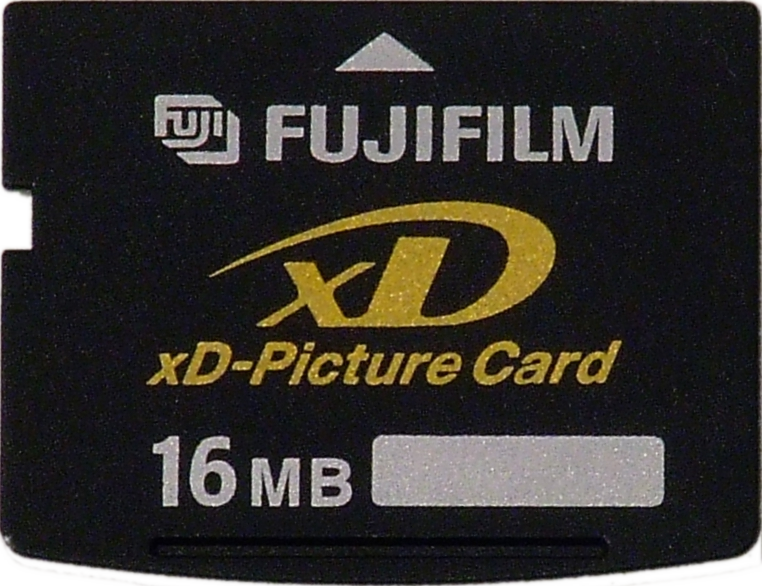
- A 16 MB xD-Picture Card from Fujifilm
- Media type: Memory card
- Capacity: 16 MB to 2 GB
- Developed by: Olympus, Fujifilm
- Manufactured by: Toshiba, Samsung
- Dimensions: 20 × 25 × 1.78 mm (0.787 × 0.984 × 0.070 in)
- Weight: 2.8 g (0.099 oz)
- Usage: Digital cameras, voice recorders
- Released: July 2002
- Discontinued: 2009

xD-Picture Card is an obsolete flash memory card format, developed jointly by Olympus and Fujifilm in 2002 as a proprietary alternative to existing formats. It was primarily used in digital cameras produced by Olympus and Fujifilm, and was also adopted by Kodak in some models. xD cards were available in capacities ranging from 16 MB (Note: one megabyte (1 MB) is equal to one million bytes (1000^{2} B)) to 2 GB. (Note: one gigabyte (1 GB) is equal to one billion bytes (1000^{3} B)) While their file transfer speeds were good by 2002 standards, by the late 2000s they offered less capacity, were slower, and were more expensive than SD cards. The format was phased out in 2009, when Fujifilm and Olympus transitioned to the more widely supported SD card format.

== History ==
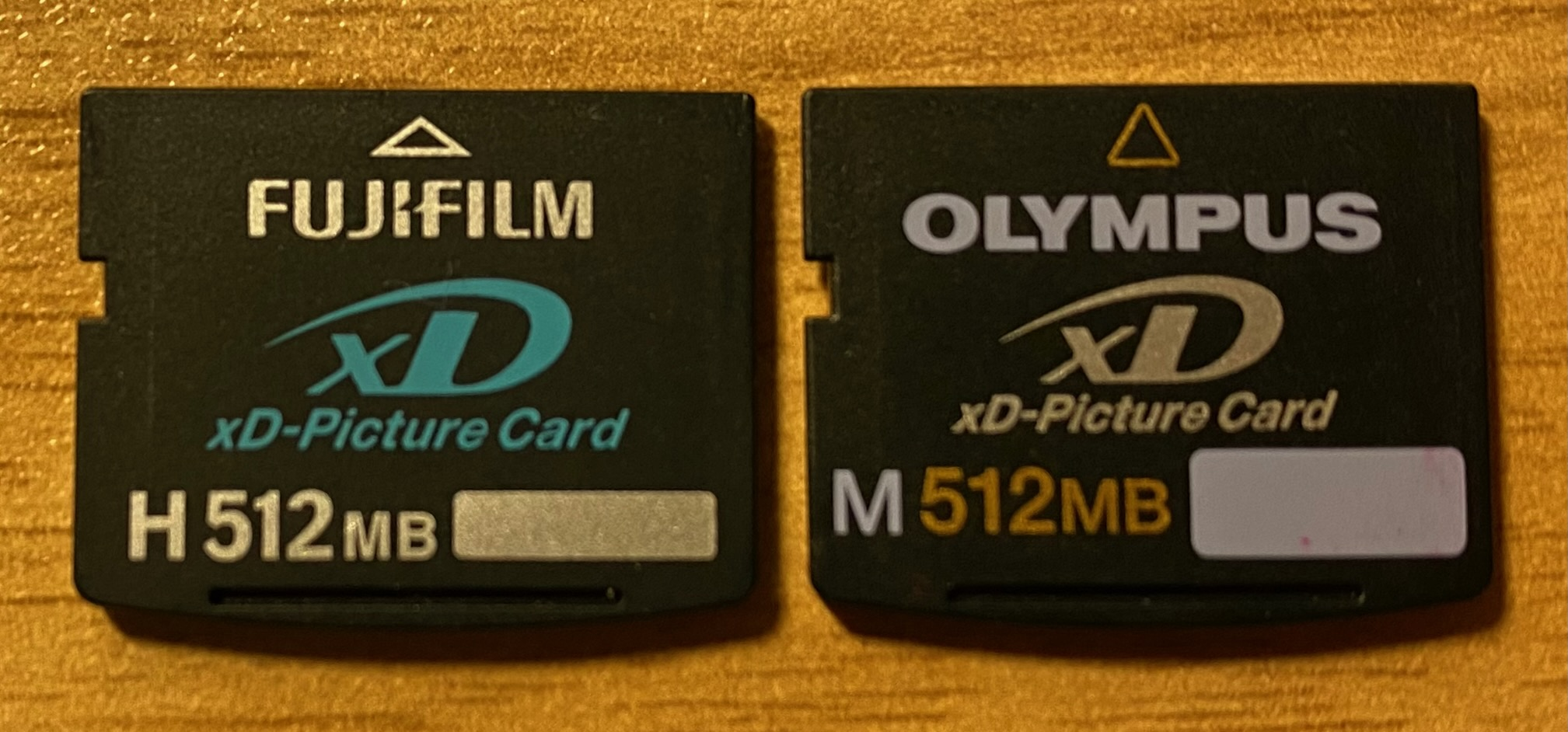
FujiFilm and Olympus branded xD cards

The cards were developed by Olympus and Fujifilm, and introduced into the market in July 2002. Toshiba Corporation and Samsung Electronics manufactured the cards for Olympus and Fujifilm. xD cards were sold under other brands, including Kodak, SanDisk, PNY, and Lexar, but were not branded with the respective companies' logos, except for Kodak. The name of the card was "inspired by" the phrase "eXtreme digital". xD cards competed primarily with Secure Digital (SD) cards, CompactFlash (CF), and Sony's Memory Stick. On its launch, some people anticipated that xD cards would become the new standard memory card format. Because of its higher cost and limited usage in products other than digital cameras, xD lost ground to SD, which is broadly used by cellular phones, personal computers, digital audio players and many other digital cameras.

Olympus included a bundled adaptor (MASD-1) with their cameras which allowed the use of microSD cards beginning with the FE-360 and FE-370 in August 2008. These adaptors were included with, and are only compatible with, Olympus cameras released between August 2008 and August 2009. Fuji did not release any such adaptor for use with their cameras, however they did release cameras which were compatible with both xD and SD cards, such as the FinePix Z10fd. The MASD-1 adaptor only physically fits in compatible Olympus cameras. Forcing the adapter into an incompatible camera can damage the XD card slot. Some compatible cameras must have their firmware upgraded to version 1.1 or above in order to use the adaptor. Only SanDisk and Toshiba microSD cards from 256 MB to 8 GB in capacity were officially supported.

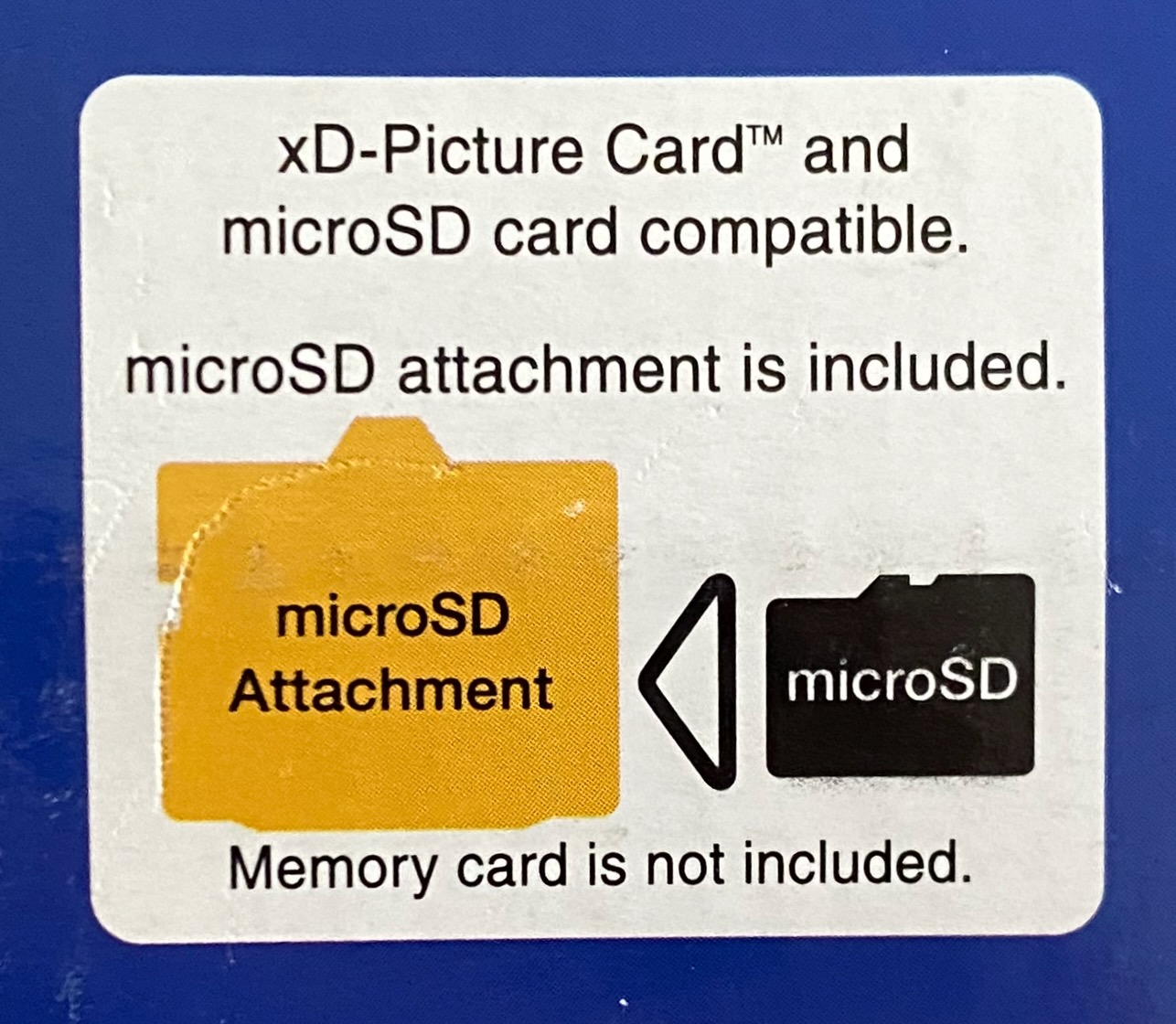
Sticker on an Olympus FE-370 box showing the camera is compatible with xD cards and the included microSD adapter. Olympus abandoned this approach, as well as the xD card format, one year later

Olympus began to move away from the xD format with the mid-2009 announcement of the E-P1 camera, which supported only Secure Digital memory cards. Higher-end DSLR cameras such as the E-3 and E-5 among others continued to use CompactFlash cards as well. The last Fujifilm camera which accepted xD cards was the Fujifilm FinePix F200EXR which was announced in February 2009. This camera also accepted SD cards. The final Olympus cameras to use xD-Picture Cards were the FE-5020, FE-4010, FE-4000, FE-46 and FE-26, which were all released in August 2009. xD cards were discontinued around the same time; Amazon Best Sellers in xD-Picture Cards reports no products offered with a Date First Available since 4 August 2009. The abandonment of the xD-Picture Card format and changeover to the SD card format was not officially acknowledged by Olympus or FujiFilm.

== Types ==
Four types of xD cards were produced over the format's lifetime. The first type had no type designation printed on the card but were retrospectively called Standard or Type S cards once other variants entered the market. Type M cards used multi-level cell technology to boost capacity at the expense of speed. Type H (high speed) cards had the fastest write speeds of any xD card but were discontinued in 2008 due to high manufacturing costs. The final type, M+ (which stood for enhanced type M) was introduced one year before Olympus and Fujifilm abandoned the format. There were plans to make xD-Card drives of up to 8 GB capacity, however this was never achieved.

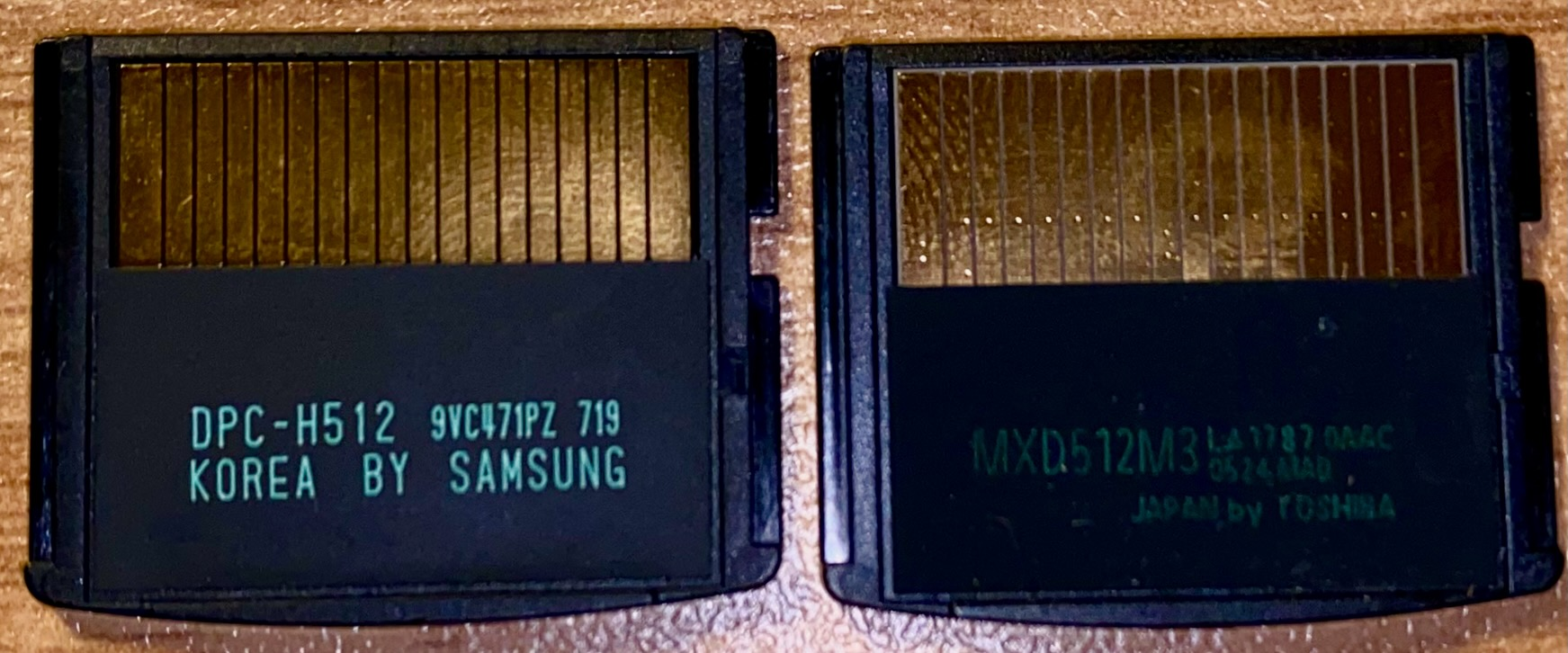
xD cards were either made in Korea by Samsung (left) or in Japan by Toshiba (right)

xD-Picture Card Types and Specifications
Designation	Capacity	Write speed	Read speed	Release date
Standard (not labelled)	16-512 MB	16 & 32 MB: 1.5 MB/s 64 - 512 MB: 3 MB/s	5 MB/s	July 2002
Type M	256 MB-2 GB	2.5 MB/s	4 MB/s	Feb 2005
Type H	256 MB-2 GB	4 MB/s	5 MB/s	Nov 2005
Type M+	1 & 2 GB	3.75 MB/s	6 MB/s	April 2008

Olympus claimed that its xD cards supported special "picture effects" when used in some Olympus cameras, though these software features are not intrinsically hardware-dependent. Type H and M+ cards however, are required in later models to capture 640×480 video at 30 FPS. Due to changes in the cards' storage architecture, later Type M and H cards may have compatibility issues with some older cameras (especially video recording). Compatibility lists are available for Olympus and Fujifilm cameras.

== Comparison with rival formats ==
=== Advantages ===
- Physically smaller than Secure Digital and Memory Stick cards (but not later derivatives such as the microSD and Memory Stick Micro).
- Faster read and write speeds than SD cards available at launch in 2002 (but not later iterations like SDHC, SDXC or SDUC cards).

=== Disadvantages ===
- Card format is proprietary to Fujifilm and Olympus, just as the Memory Stick format is to Sony. No public documentation was available (see below for reverse-engineering results). In contrast, the CompactFlash format is described by completely open and free specifications.
- Has not kept up with the transfer speeds of newer SD card revisions post-2002.
- being directly derived from the SmartMedia card, the xD card has no wear leveling, bad block management, and error detection controllers. These functions must be performed by the device into which the xD card is inserted.
- Generally more expensive than other memory card types. As of September 2009, 2 GB (2000 MB) xD cards' retail prices were approximately three times those of same-capacity SD cards.
- Small maximum capacity relative to other memory card formats.
- Less widely supported by camera, card reader, and accessory manufacturers than SD cards.

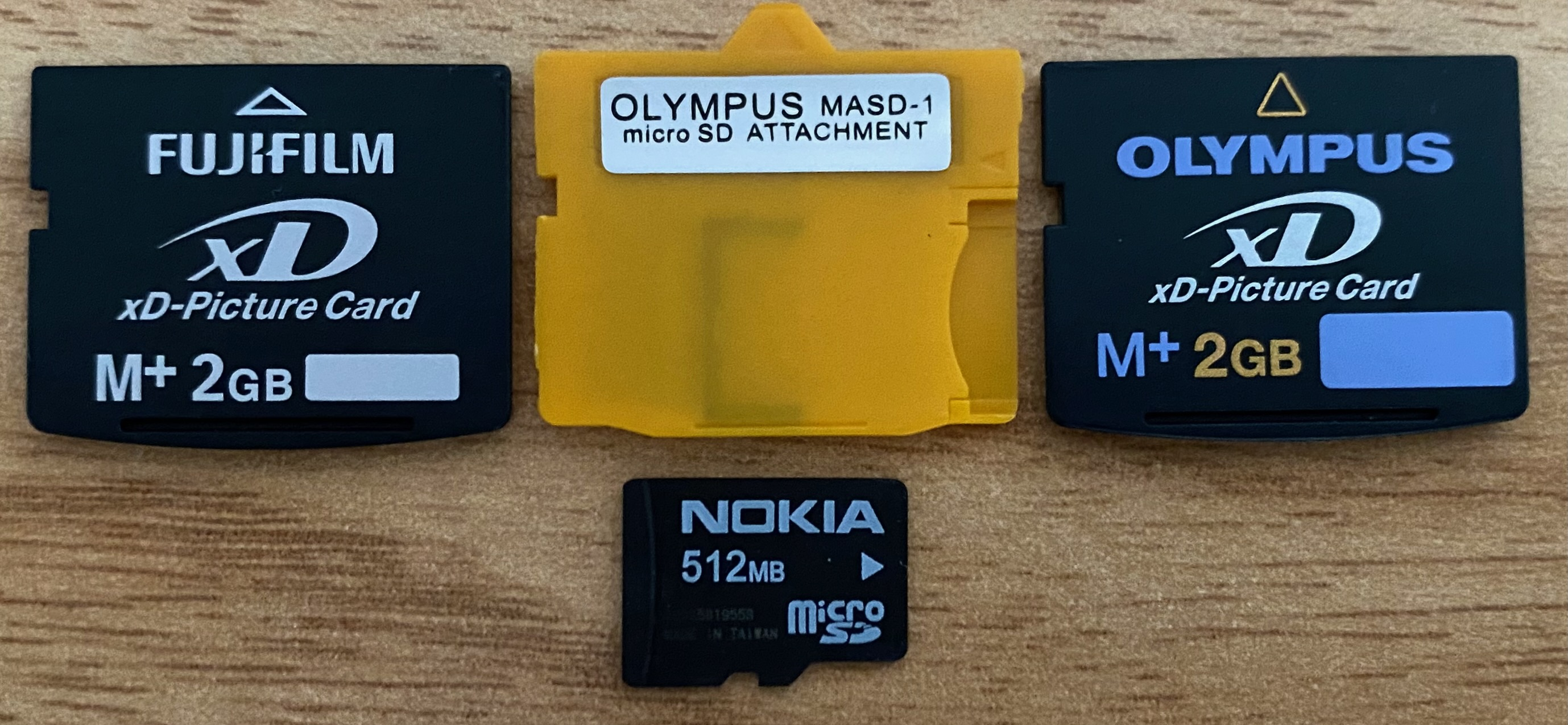
xD cards sold by FujiFilm and Olympus on either side of the Olympus MASD-1 xD to microSD adapter card (microSD card below for scale)

== Specifications ==
Detailed specifications are tightly controlled by Olympus and Fujifilm, which charge licensing fees and royalties and require non-disclosure agreements in exchange for the technical information required to produce xD-compatible devices.

The memory format used is not well-documented. It is difficult to study it directly, since most camera devices and most USB card readers do not provide direct access to the flash memory. Since the cards are controller-less, cameras and card readers must perform wear leveling and error detection. They normally hide the portion of the memory which stores this information (among other things) from higher level access.

=== Reverse engineering ===
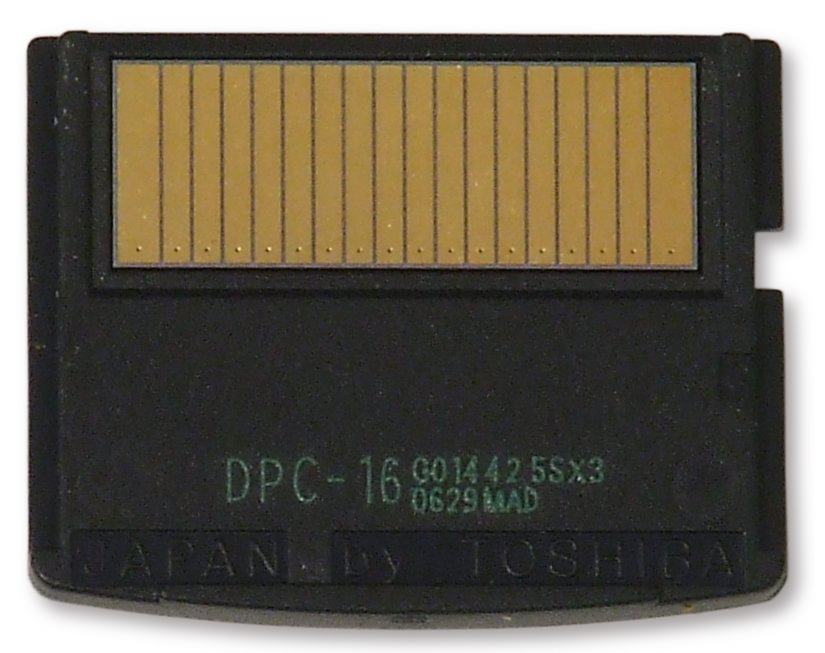
The back of an xD card, showing the 18 pins

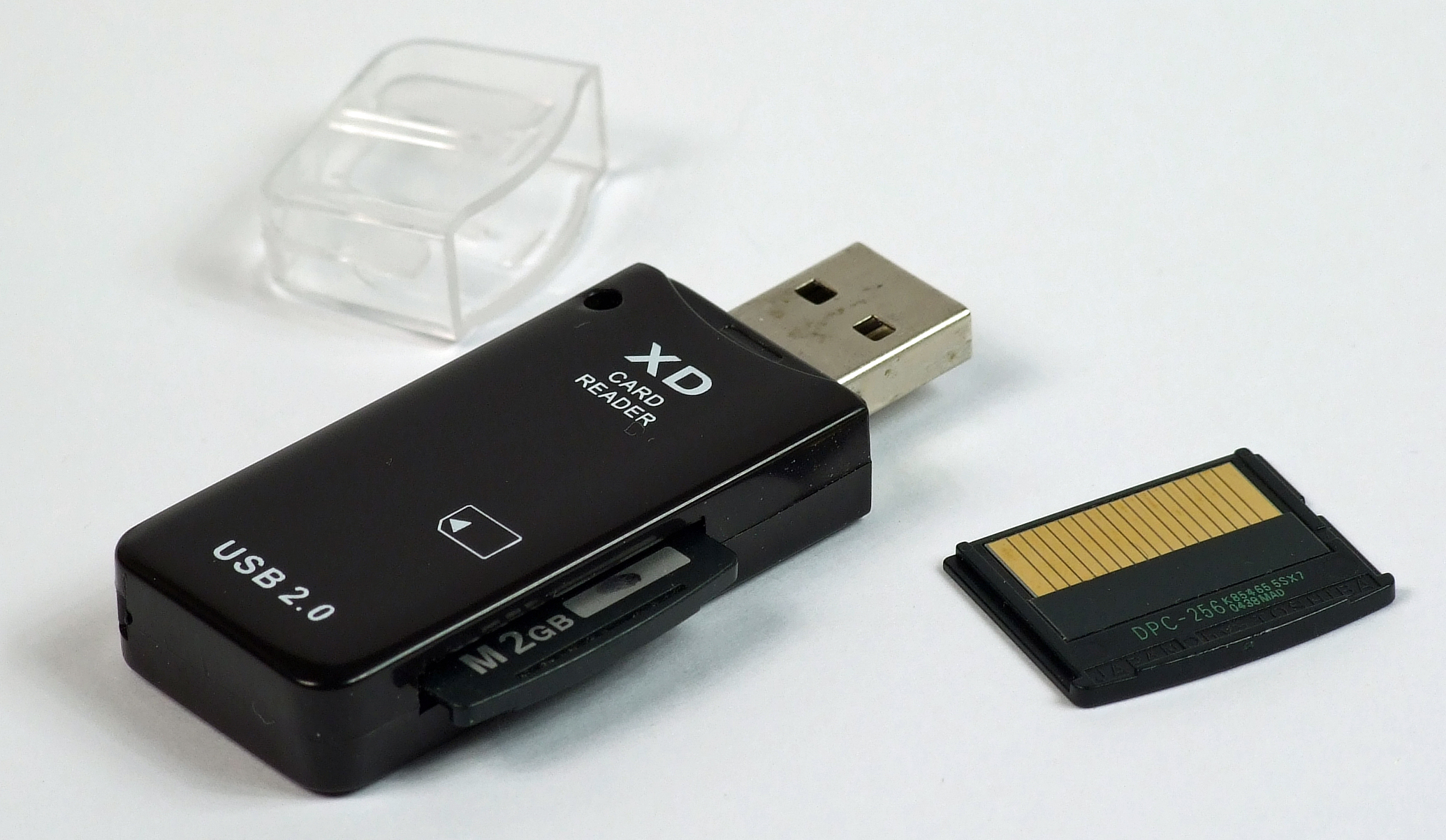
USB xD card reader

However, a few models of xD card readers based on the Alauda chip do allow direct access (bypassing the above mechanisms) to an xD card's flash memory. These readers have been reverse-engineered and Linux drivers have been produced by the Alauda Project, which has documented the on-chip data structures of the xD card. According to this information, xD card headers are similar to those used by SmartMedia, and include chip manufacturer information.

=== Raw hardware ===
At the raw hardware level, an xD card is simply an ordinary NAND flash integrated circuit in an unusual package. Comparing the pinout of a 18-pin to the pinout of a NAND flash chip in a standard TSOP package, there is very close correspondence between the active pins of the two devices. xD cards share this characteristic with the older SmartMedia cards, which are also basically raw NAND flash chips, albeit in a larger package.

xD and SmartMedia cards can be used by hobbyists as a convenient source of NAND flash memory chips for custom projects. For example, the Mattel Juice Box PMP can be booted into Linux using a modified cartridge containing an xD card with a boot image written on it. Additionally, SmartMedia and xD card readers can be used to read the data from NAND flash chips in electronic devices, by soldering leads between the chip and the card reader.

== Panoramic mode ==
Some Olympus cameras offer camera-based panoramic processing. In those cameras that support both xD and CompactFlash cards, panoramic processing only works with images stored on the xD card, if installed. Newer Olympus cameras have neither xD cards nor this restriction.

Unsubtantiated reports claim that some cameras such as the E-450 only support panoramic processing when using Olympus branded xD cards. The model numbers have not been documented. In this case, there appears to be a workaround: it appears that the card manufacturer information is simply stored in the flash memory, in the Card Information Structure. Thus, it is possible to alter another brand of xD card to present itself as Olympus xD card by accessing the raw flash memory. This can be done by using a hacked device driver for a USB card reader.

== See also ==
- Comparison of memory cards
- Format war
