= P2 (storage media) =

Memory card format

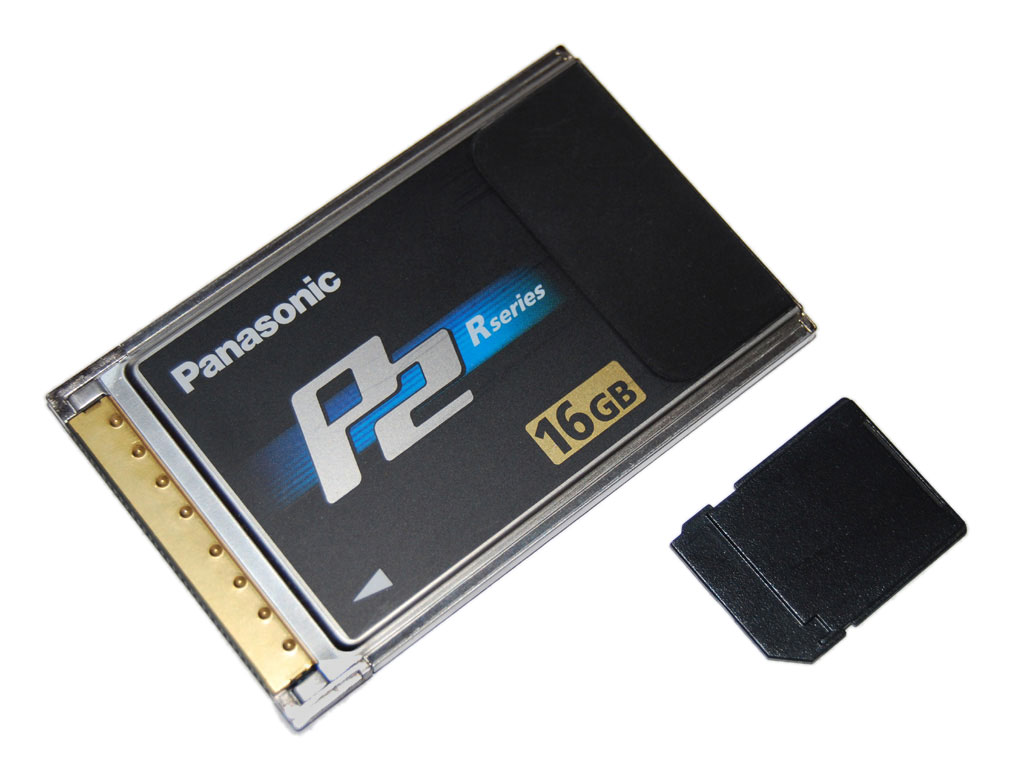
- A 16 GB P2 card next to a Secure Digital card
- Media type: Flash memory
- Encoding: NTSC, PAL, High-definition video
- Developed by: Panasonic
- Usage: Video production

P2 (P2 is a short form for "Professional Plug-In") is a professional digital recording solid-state memory storage media format introduced by Panasonic in 2004.

== P2 ==
The original P2 card is essentially a RAID of flash chips (originally Secure Digital (SD) memory cards) with an LSI controller tightly packaged in a die-cast PC Card (formerly PCMCIA) enclosure. The system includes cameras, decks as drop-in replacements for videotape decks, and a special 5.25-inch computer drive for random-access integration with non-linear editing systems (NLE). The cards can also be used directly where a PC card (PCMCIA) slot is available, as in most older notebook computers, as a normal hard disk drive, although a custom software driver must first be loaded.

At introduction, P2 cards offered low recording capacity compared to competing, video tape-based formats (a miniDV tape holds roughly 13 GB of data, and an S-size HDCAM tape holds 50 GB). To solve this, camcorders and decks using P2 media employ multiple card slots, with the ability to span the recording over all slots.

P2 cards are of a ruggedized PCMCIA type with the fastest transfer speeds currently available through this format. The card also contains a processor that organizes and safeguards the files and the case is developed and crafted to "military" (according to Panasonic) specifications, making P2 cards tough and reliable.

The first pieces of equipment released by Panasonic which used the P2 format included the AJ-SPX800 (a 2/3" broadcast camcorder for ENG and EFP applications), the studio recorder AJ-SPD850, the AJ-PCD10 offload device (basically, a five-slot PC card reader with USB interface designed to fit a 5-1/4" IT systems bay), and the memory cards themselves – AJ-P2C004 (4 GB) and AJ-P2C002 (2 GB). Panasonic is currently shipping a wide range of camcorders that support the P2 format. Panasonic also announced the P2-based AG-HPX170 handheld HD tapeless camcorder. The HPX170 is very similar to the HVX200 and the HVX200A, the main difference being the lack of a video tape drive on the HPX170.

As of 2025, (original format) P2 cards are available in capacities of 30 and 60 GB in the "F" series.

=== Specifications ===
- File format: MXF
- Maximum datarate: 1.22 Gbit/s
  - As of 2025, the F series P2 card supports AVC-Intra class 200, which requires 226 Mbit/sec.
- Available sizes: 2, 4, 8, 16, 32 and 64 GB (formerly); 30 and 60 GB (since 2015)
- Form factor: PC card (PCMCIA) type II

== MicroP2 ==
On April 15, 2012, Panasonic introduced the "MicroP2" system, an entirely different format based on SDHC/SDXC conforming to UHS-II (Ultra-High Speed) bus mode.

Most (but not all) current P2 products can use MicroP2 (UHS-II) and SDHC/SDXC (UHS-I/UHS-II) cards through a MicroP2 card adapter, with some requiring a firmware update: the adapter essentially acts as a SD card reader in the P2 form factor. Some P2 products (such as the AG-HPX500E camera) are not able to use MicroP2 at all.

As of October 2025, the only 64 GB model of microP2 is listed as "discontinued".

== expressP2 ==
On February 27, 2014, Panasonic announced a new generation of P2 media, the expressP2 card, designed to accommodate high frame rate 1080 HDAVC-ULTRA recording (above 60fps) as well as 4K capture. The expressP2 has the same external form factor as the original P2, but has capacities of up to 512 GB. Instead of being RAID based, it claims to have "error correction capability equivalent to the RAID system". It does not claim to be compatible with the (PC card) CardBus, unlike the original.

The expressP2 card B series required a firmware/driver upgrade for devices and computers connected using card readers. The C series requires another upgrade and the D series has the same requirements as the C series.

== P2 card run times timetable ==
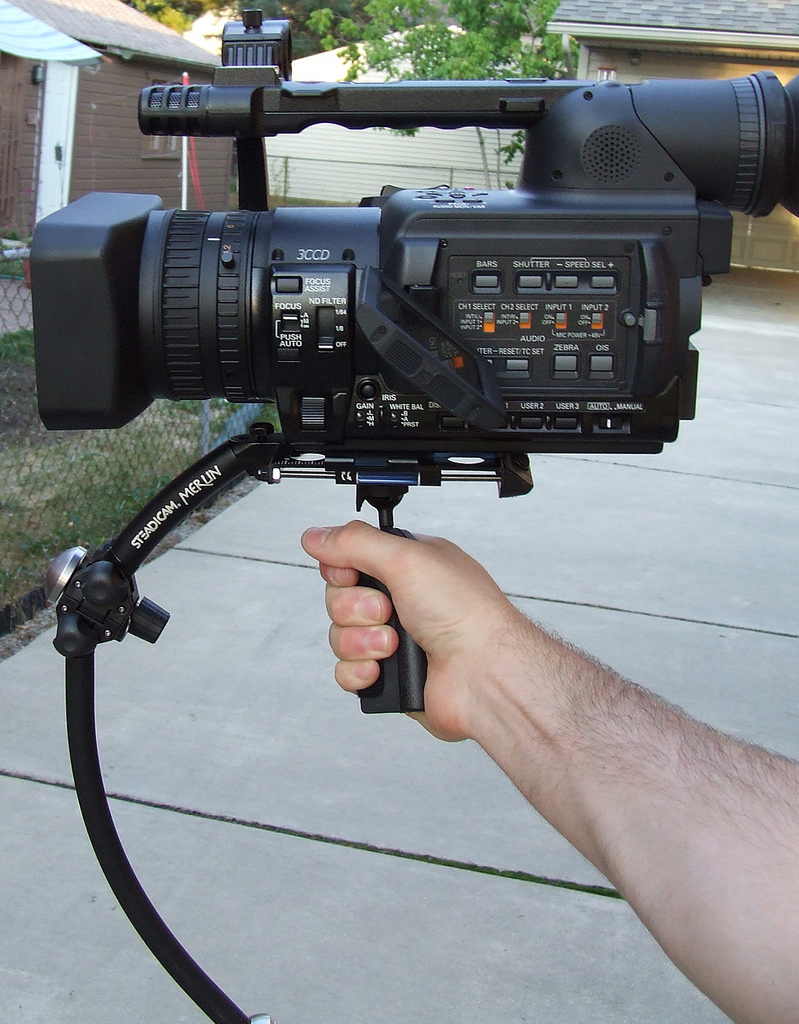
AG-HVX200 handheld

Model #	Capacity	DVCPro	DVCProHD 720pN24	DVCPro50, DVCProHD 720pN30, or AVC-Intra 50	DVCProHD at 1080i60 or 720p60, or AVC-Intra 100
AJ-P2C004H	4 GB	16 min.	10 min.	8 min.	4 min.
AJ-P2C008H	8 GB	32 min.	20 min.	16 min	8 min.
AJ-P2C016H	16 GB	1 hr. 4 min.	40 min.	32 min.	16 min
AJ-P2C032H	32 GB	2 hrs. 8 min.	1 hr. 20 min.	1 hr. 4 min.	32 min.
AJ-P2C064H	64 GB	4 hrs. 16 min.	2 hrs. 40 min.	2 hrs. 8 min.	1 hr. 4 min.

Panasonic recently published a slightly more complicated version of this table for 16 and 32 GB cards.

== P2 camera range ==
=== Handheld models ===
AG-HPX170 (NTSC version)

- Compact, lightweight HD/SD camera-recorder
- 13× zoom lens with 28 mm wide-angle

AG-HPX171 (European version)

- Compact, lightweight HD/SD camera-recorder
- 13× zoom lens with 28 mm wide-angle
- Improved ergonomics, features and image quality compared to its predecessor

AG-HVX200

- Progressive native 16:9 HD 3CCD imaging system
- HD quality Leica Dicomar wide-angle zoom lens
- Progressive modes supported

AG-HPX250

AG-HVX202AEN HD DVC-PRO

=== Shoulder mount models ===
AG-HPX300/HPX301

- Three pieces of 1/3-inch MOS image sensor (1920 × 1080 pixels each)
- Removable 1/3-inch lens
- AVC-Intra 50/100 and DVCPRO HD/50/25 codecs compatible
- Variable Frame Rate
- LCoS viewfinder
- Two P2 slots

AG-HPX370/371

- New 2,2MPx MAICO CMOS sensor with improved sensitivity F11
- Other features as above HPX301

AG-HPX500/HPX555

- Three pieces of 2/3-inch CCD image sensor (960 × 540 pixels each)
- DVCPRO HD/50/25 codecs compatible
- Variable Frame rate function
- Four P2 slots

AJ-HPX2000(AJ-HPX2100 in Europe)

- Three pieces of 2/3-inch CCD image sensor (1280 × 720 pixels each)
- DVCPRO HD codecs compatible
- AVC-Intra 50 and 100 codecs as an option
- 10 bit/4:2:2 Recording with Full Sampling as an option
- Variable Frame rate function
- Five P2 slots

AJ-HPX2700

- One of the new P2 Varicam range
- Variable Frame Rate of 1 frame/s to 60 frame/s
- 10 bit/4:2:2 Recording with Full Sampling
- AVC-Intra codec recording system

AJ-HPX3000

- DVCPRO HD/AVC-Intra codecs compatible
- Native 1080p 4:2:2 10-bit
- Newly developed high-resolution 2.2-megapixel CCD

AJ-HPX3700

- Super High-End HD Camera-Recorder for Cinema Production, part of the P2 Varicam range
- RGB 4:4:4 and 24PsF output
- AVC-Intra codec recording system

AU-VREC1G

- Varicam 35 & Varicam HS Camera-Recorder, part of the P2 Varicam range
