= Kotaro Hayashida =

Japanese video game designer

Kotaro Hayashida (小太郎林田 Kotarō Hayashida), also known by the pseudonym Ossale Kohta (オサール・コウタ), is a Japanese video game designer best known for his work at Sega, which he joined in 1983. He has worked on games such as Alex Kidd in Miracle World and Phantasy Star.

== Career ==
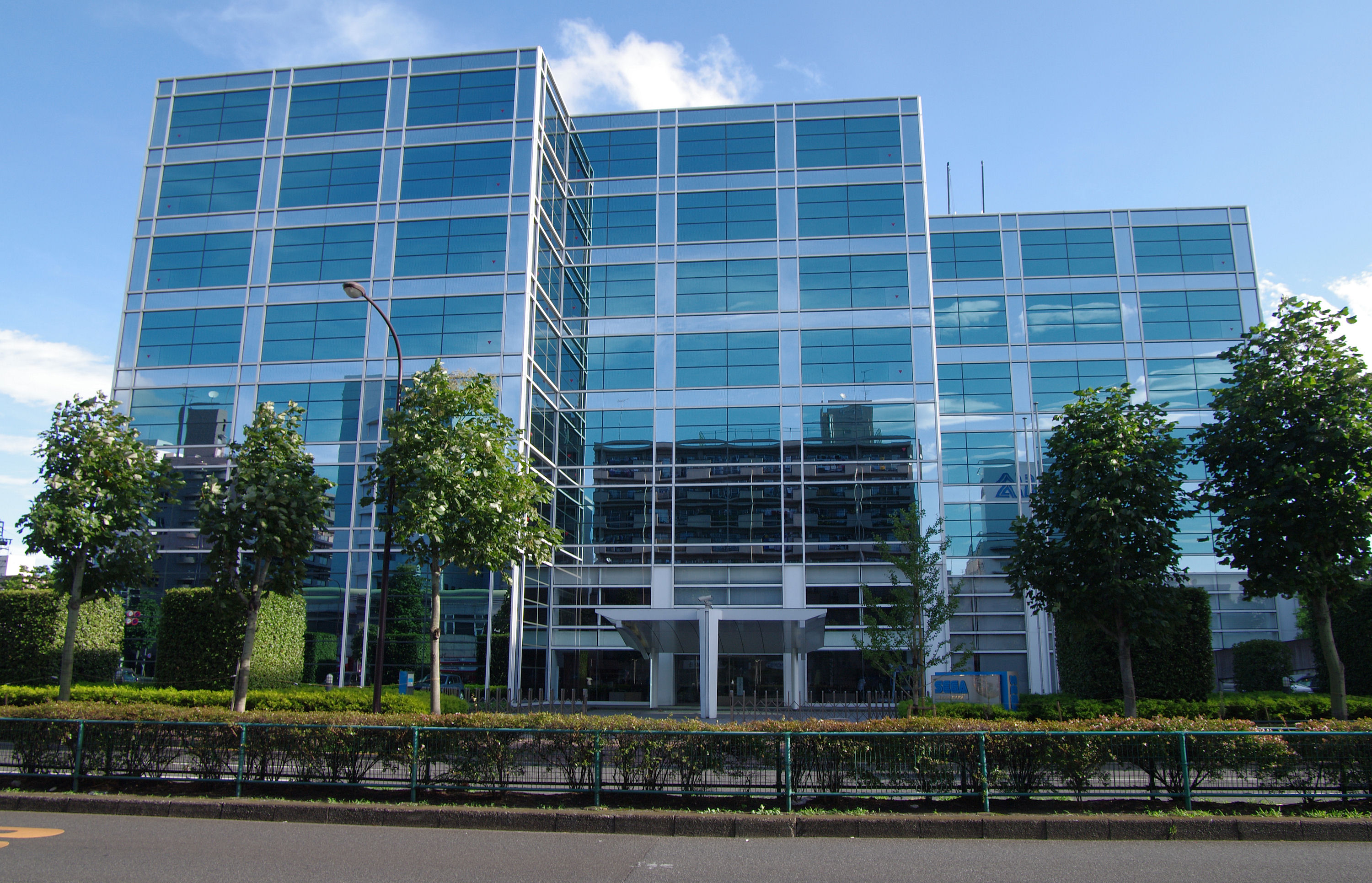
Sega's former headquarters in Tokyo

In 1983, Hayashida was a recent college graduate, and saw a Sega job advertisement in a magazine. He took the Shinkansen to Ōta, Tokyo, but got lost on the way to the main headquarters and ended up at one of Sega's factories instead. An employee drove him to Sega's headquarters, and following an interview he was given a job. He also had a scheduled interview with Namco, but chose to accept the job at Sega.

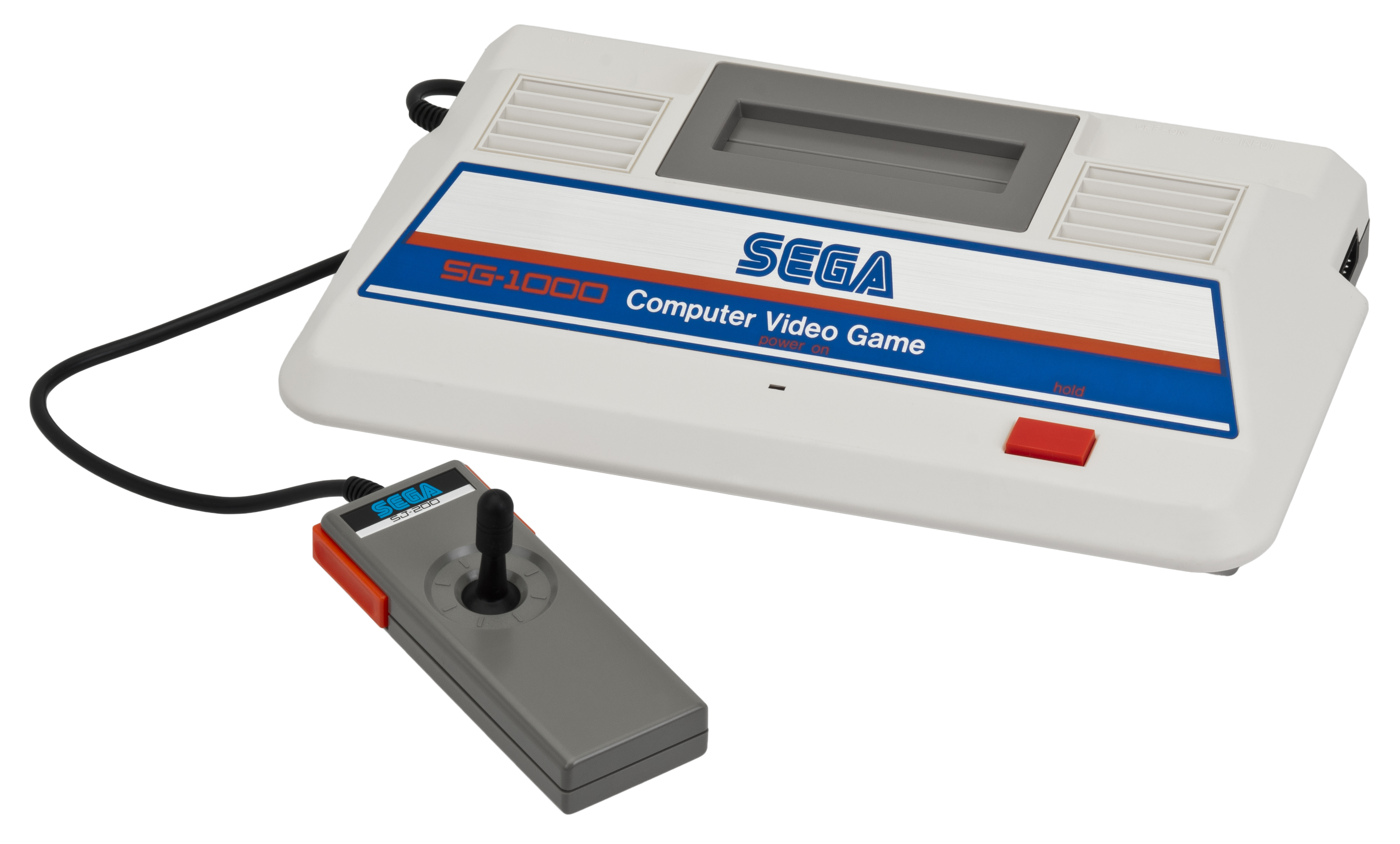
The Sega SG-1000 is the first console Hayashida developed for.

When Hayashida joined Sega, the company had only just started developing video game consoles. The first game he worked on was an arcade game, the unreleased Chain Pit. His first released game was Hussle Chumy for the SG-1000, which was developed with Compile. After this he worked on numerous games, including Pitfall II, My Hero, and Ninja Princess.

In 1985, Sega decided that in order to compete with the smash hit Super Mario Bros., it needed to create similar property for the Master System. That year, Sega had split development into two divisions, for arcade and for console. Hayashida and his team therefore began development of an action game. He had already completed 10 games when he began work on Alex Kidd in Miracle World in 1986.

After Alex Kidd, Hayashida worked on Phantasy Star under the pseudonym "Ossale Kohta" as the game's main planner. He continued to develop for Sega into the 1990s, with his last credit being the 32X port of Space Harrier.

After leaving Sega, he worked for the Japanese developer Game Arts. There he worked on Grandia for the PlayStation in 1999, and Bomberman Generation on GameCube.

== Games ==
- Hustle Chumy (1984)
- Champion Pro Wrestling (1985)
- Zoom 909 (SG-1000) (1985)
- Pitfall II (SG-1000) (1985)
- Great Soccer (1985)
- Transbot (Master System) (1985)
- Pit Pot (1985)
- My Hero (Master System) (1986)
- Ninja Princess (1986)
- Pro Wrestling (1986)
- Alex Kidd in Miracle World (1986) — (as Kotaro)
- Woody Pop (Master System) (1987)
- Zillion (1987) — Plan (as Ossale Kohta)
- Alex Kidd BMX Trial (1987)
- Phantasy Star (1987) — Scenario and supervision (as Ossale Kohta)
- Tensai Bakabon (1988)
- Super Racing (1988)
- Space Harrier II (Mega Drive) (1988) — Planner (as Ossale Kohta)
- Alex Kidd in the Enchanted Castle (1989)
- Phantasy Star III: Generations of Doom (1990) — Special Thanks (as Ossale Kohta)
- Pyramid Magic (1991) — Special Thanks (as Ossale)
- Putter Golf (1991) — Special Thanks (as Ossale)
- Phantasy Star IV: The End of the Millennium (1993) — Special Thanks (as K.Hayashida)
- After Burner Complete (1994) — Special Thanks (as K.Hayashida)
- Space Harrier (32X) (1994) — Special Thanks (as K.Hayashida)

== Trivia ==
If a player uses the name Kotaro for the Master System version of California Games he or she will be awarded with a better BMX bike after breaking any kind of record.
