= Zillion (disambiguation) =

A zillion is a fictitious, indefinitely large number.

Zillion or Zillions may also refer to:

- Zillion (anime), 1987 Japanese anime television series and its direct-to-video sequel Zillion: Burning Night, plus spinoffs
  - Zillion (video game), released alongside the anime series
  - Zillion II, sequel to the first video game
- Zillions of Games, a computer software game-playing engine
- Zillions (magazine), a version of Consumer Reports magazine for children
