= Alex Kidd: The Lost Stars =

1986 video game

- Promotional flyer featuring player characters Alex Kidd and Stella
- Developer: Sega
- Publisher: Sega
- Composer: Hiroshi Kawaguchi
- Series: Alex Kidd
- Platforms: Arcade, Master System
- Release: Arcade; December 1986; Master System: JP: March 10, 1988; NA: July 1988; EU: 1988
- Genre: Platform
- Modes: Single-player, multiplayer
- Arcade system: Sega System 16A

Alex Kidd: The Lost Stars (Note: Japanese: アレックスキッド ザ・ロストスターズ, Hepburn: Arekkusu Kiddo Za Rosuto Sutāzu) is a 1986 arcade platform game developed and published by Sega. Exclusively released in Japan, it later saw a worldwide release upon being ported to the Master System in 1988. In the game, players control either Alex Kidd or Stella through a series of side-scrolling levels, which need to be completed within a time limit.

The game’s Master System port later saw a digital release for the Wii Virtual Console in North America on March 9, 2009 and in Europe on April 17, 2009.

== Story ==
Alex Kidd: The Lost Stars features Alex Kidd and Stella searching for the twelve Zodiac signs. Alex's mission is to run through each level, knocking down enemies, and obtain the six miracle balls. These balls are hidden inside such unusual places as a Christmas present, the Fantasy Zone ship out of action, a pumpkin, a clamshell, a golden egg, and a desk bell. Levels include Toy World, Machine World, World of Make Believe, Water World, Monster World, and Giant's Body.

Once the six miracle balls are obtained, Alex must then venture in outer space to carry them to the holy land of Ziggurat. After the last level, the Shrine of Jiggarat, is complete, the player must run through all the levels again, but with new enemies. The player is under a time limit, and if the time expires, the player will lose a life.

The game is noteworthy for the scream Alex lets out whenever he gets hit, falls, or loses all his time.

== Versions ==
Screenshot of the arcade version

The arcade and Master System versions are similar, aside from graphics and sound. The arcade version has a limited number of lives (three by default), whereas the Master System version has infinite lives, though being hit or falling into a pit subtracts seconds in the timer and backtracks the player to the last checkpoint in the round. The arcade version features a cooperative two-player mode, with the second player assuming the control of a female counterpart to Alex Kidd named Stella.

== Reception ==
In Japan, Game Machine listed Alex Kidd: The Lost Stars on their February 1, 1988 issue as being the thirteenth most-successful table arcade unit of the month.

Computer and Video Games reviewed the Sega Master System version in 1990, giving it an 80% score. The magazine praised the "jolly and colourful" graphics and said "the gameplay is as addictive as all the others in the series."

Retrospectively, Lucas Thomas IGN rated the Virtual Console release 5 out of 10. He stated that it "lost almost all of the momentum built up" by Alex Kidd in Miracle World and "did away with many of the mechanics that made Miracle World memorable, like the different rideable vehicles" and the ability to punch.
