= Alex Kidd: High-Tech World =

1987 video game

- Developer: Sega
- Publisher: Sega
- Platform: Master System
- Release: JP: July 19, 1987; NA: June 1989; EU: 1989
- Genre: Action-adventure
- Mode: Single-player

Alex Kidd: High Tech World is a 1989 side-scrolling action-adventure game developed and published by Sega for the Master System as part of the Alex Kidd series. It is a modified version of the 1987 Japanese Master System game Anmitsu Hime (あんみつ姫; "Princess Anmitsu"), which was based on a manga series of the same name. The game combines adventure, platform, and puzzle-solving elements.

The English version was not conceived as an Alex Kidd game in Japan and caused inconsistencies for the Alex Kidd storyline in the West. Other than Alex, none of the previously established characters in the Alex Kidd universe are in the game. Alex has a brother James in High-Tech World who is never mentioned elsewhere.

== Story ==
Alex Kidd is contacted by one of his friends, who tells him a new arcade, High-Tech World, has opened in town. Alex has a map to its location, but it has been torn into eight pieces and is needed to find the arcade before it closes at 5:00 sharp. He solves puzzles, answers questions, runs errands and does housework to find the pieces. However, once he finds the pieces of the map, he learns that the front gates are shut, and thus is unable to leave. Using a hang-glider to leave the house, he lands in the forest. On his way to the arcade, a clan of ninjas appear, who attempt to attack him. Upon fighting through the forest of ninjas, Alex finally makes it to the Arcade.

== Gameplay ==
The object of the game is to get through four stages. Half the stages contain puzzles to progress and people to talk to, while the other two are linear levels with enemies along the way. There are a variety of ways to fail in the puzzle stages when Alex has some sort of accident or does something he should not.

== Reception ==
Reception

Review scores
Publication	Score
Computer and Video Games	76%
Electronic Gaming Monthly	26/40
Mean Machines Sega	76%

The game received mixed reviews. Computer and Video Games said the fun "graphics, sound and gameplay conspire together to make an addictive game" but it was not "quite as good as" Miracle World. Four reviewers of Electronic Gaming Monthly gave the game an overall score of 26 out of 40. Mean Machines Sega rated the game 76%, praising the good graphics and sound, while stating that it did not offer anything better than the original.
