= Shōsuke =

- Gender: Male

Origin
- Origin: Japanese
- Meaning: Different meanings depending on the kanji used

Shōsuke, Shosuke or Shousuke (written: 勝介, 勝助, 章介, 彰輔 or 奨典) is a masculine Japanese given name. Notable people with the name include:

- Shosuke Katayama (片山 奨典; born 1983), Japanese footballer
- Shosuke Kurakane (倉金 章介; 1914–1973), pen-name of Torao Kurakane, Japanese manga artist
- Shōsuke Nakawa (奈河 彰輔; born 1931), Japanese playwright and theatre director
- Shosuke Suzuki (鈴木 章介; born 1936), Japanese decathlete
- Tanaka Shōsuke (田中 勝助), Japanese explorer and merchant
- Shōsuke Tanihara (谷原 章介; born 1972), Japanese actor
