= Alex Kidd in the Enchanted Castle =

1989 video game

- North American box art
- Developer: Sega
- Publisher: Sega
- Producer: Kotaro Hayashida
- Designers: Kotaro Hayashida; Hirokazu Yasuhara
- Artists: Rieko Kodama; Naoto Ohshima; Takashi Yuda
- Composer: Chikako Kamatani
- Series: Alex Kidd
- Platform: Genesis/Mega Drive
- Release: JP: February 10, 1989; NA: January 1990; EU: 1990
- Genre: Platform
- Mode: Single-player

Alex Kidd in the Enchanted Castle (Note: Japanese: アレックスキッド 天空魔城, Hepburn: Arekkusu Kiddo Tenkū Majō) is a 1989 platform game developed and published by Sega for the Genesis. It is the only 16-bit platform game starring Alex Kidd, and the fifth game in the Alex Kidd series.

Alex Kidd in the Enchanted Castle follows Alex as he fights his way through the fictional planet Paperock in search of his long-lost father, King Thor. Alex has access to several items and vehicles that help him complete his quest, including a motorbike, a pedicopter and a pogo stick, which each give him unique abilities. While traveling through eleven worlds, Alex must defeat several opponents in rock paper scissors matches before finally finding King Thor.

== Gameplay ==
Alex Kidd in a rock paper scissors match against a gorilla to win a powerbracelet

The player guides Alex through eleven stages by fighting and avoiding enemies and obstacles. Alex can jump, kick, crawl or punch enemies, causing them to explode into gold coins, called Baums. New items and vehicles are gained by playing Janken (rock paper scissors) in gambling houses, including the Sukopako Motorcycle, the pedicopter (a small pedal-powered helicopter), a pogo stick and wizard cane which allows Alex to float in the air for a few seconds. One hit from any enemy causes Alex to die instantly.

In the original Japanese version of the game, when Alex or his opponent lose a Rock Paper Scissors match, the loser's clothes disappear, leaving them naked with a fig leaf covering their genitalia. In the Western versions, the loser is flattened by a heavy weight. Several levels were also renamed for the Western release.

== Plot ==
The plot continues that of Alex Kidd in Miracle World (1986). Alex lives on Planet Aries which is ruled by his brother, King Igul. After hearing a rumor that his long-lost father, King Thor, is still alive on Planet Paperock, Alex travels to the planet to search for him.

== Reception and legacy ==
Reception

Aggregate score
Aggregator	Score
GameRankings	47.5%

Review scores
Publication	Score
Eurogamer	4/10
GameSpot	3.8/10
IGN	4.5/10
MegaTech	68%
Console XS	72%

The game received mixed reviews upon release. Later retrospective sources have given it mixed to negative reviews, with a rating of 47.5% from GameRankings. Lucas M. Thomas, reviewing the game for IGN, gave the game a 4.5/10, criticising the game's "floaty play control" and the Rock, Paper, Scissors boss battles, lamenting: "It's all very random, and it's not fun at all". Thomas also commented that "You'll understand why SEGA dropped [Alex Kidd]". Frank Provo of GameSpot had similar problems with the game, also criticising the controls and stating that "Alex slides around like his feet are coated with oil". Provo additionally disapproved of the game's level design, calling it "unremarkable" and that "the game's 11 stages are short left-to-right strips peppered with the same rocks, trees, breakable bricks and generic enemies." He gave Enchanted Castle 3.8/10. Eurogamer's Dan Whitehead gave the game a 4/10, disliking the game's "abominable collision detection" and "infantile effort". Like Thomas, he was dissatisfied with the game's Rock, Paper, Scissors sections, observing that "victory comes from blind luck, you'll sit there ... hoping the law of averages means you'll eventually choose the right option and escape from this Groundhog Day gaming hell". MegaTech gave a review score of 68% and commenting that the game's graphics and sound are almost Master System standard and saying it's fun to play it doesn't have the same addictive spark like its predecessors. They recommend the game for Alex Kidd fans. Console XS gave a score of 72%, writing: "This platform adventure has loads of games and is packed with average selection of adversaries but the whole thing gets very boring." Alex Kidd in the Enchanted Castle has included in a variety of Mega Drive game compilations for newer platforms. The game is part of the Sega Mega Drive Collection (known in America as the Sega Genesis Collection) for the PlayStation 2 and PlayStation Portable and was also released on the Wii's Virtual Console on April 9, 2007, in North America and May 4, 2007, in Europe. The game later appeared in Sonic's Ultimate Genesis Collection / Sega Mega Drive Ultimate Collection for Xbox 360 and PlayStation 3. The game is also included in the second volume of Sega Mega Drive Classic Collection for PC, as well as in the box set of all volumes, Sega Mega Drive Classic Collection: Gold Edition. The game is also available as a standalone unit on the Arcade Legends Sega Genesis Volume 2 plug and play joypad, released by Radica, and the Sega Mega Drive Handheld, a portable game console containing twenty games. It has also been released for Microsoft Windows on Steam individually and as part of Sega Genesis Classics Pack 2, and included in the console releases of the same series, Sega Genesis Classics. It is also one of the 42 games pre-installed in the Sega Genesis Mini console.
