= Sega Card =

Memory cards used for game storage

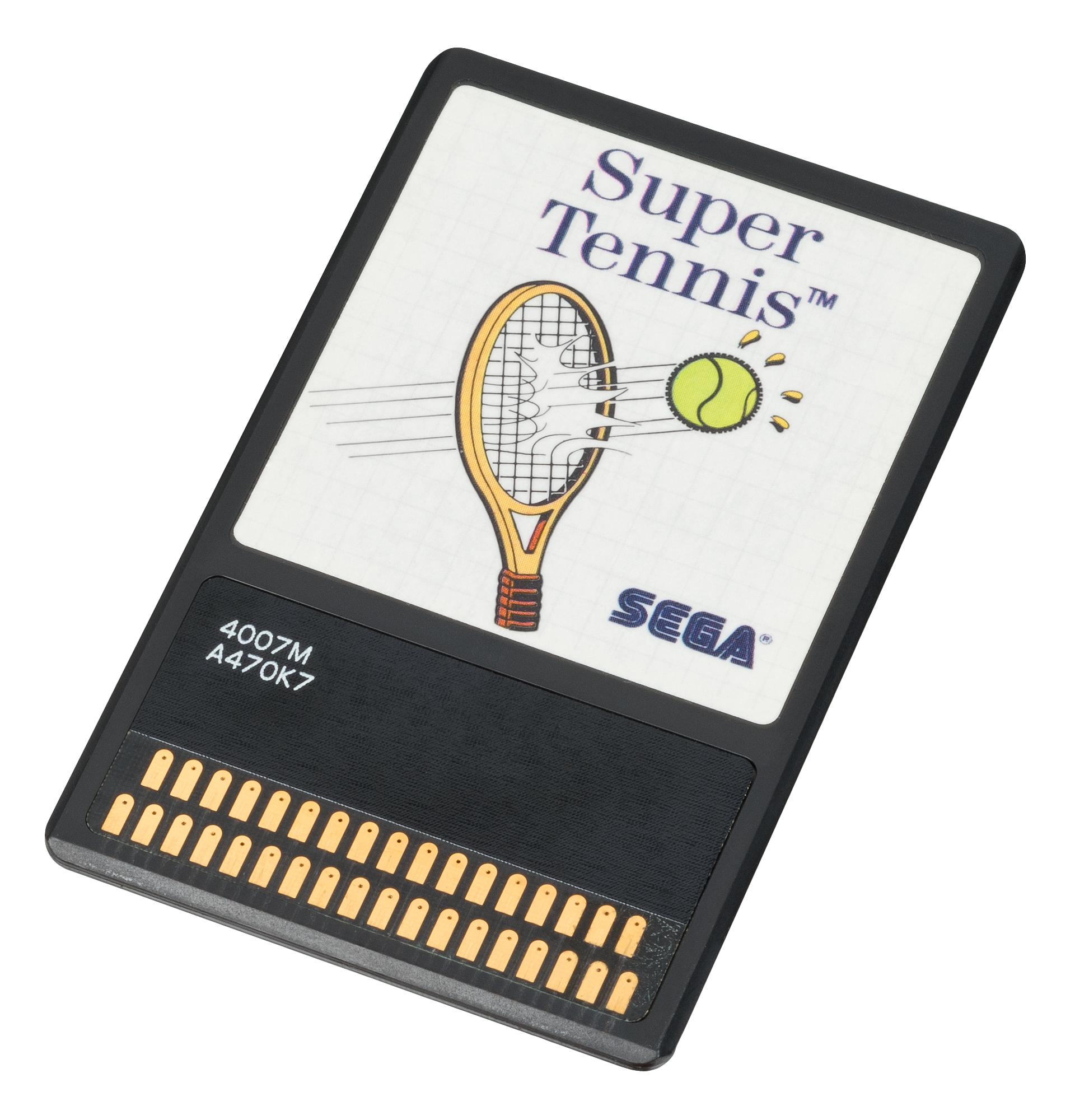
- Sega Card for Super Tennis
- Media type: Memory card
- Capacity: 32 kB
- Developed by: Sega
- Manufactured by: Mitsubishi Plastics
- Dimensions: 54 mm × 85.5 mm × 2 mm (2.13 in × 3.37 in × 0.08 in)
- Usage: SG-1000 and Master System software medium

The Sega Card, known in Japan as the Sega My Card, is a memory card format used as game storage for the SG-1000/SC-3000 and the Mark III / Master System. Produced from 1985 to 1987 by Mitsubishi Plastics, the cards are plugged into onboard cardslots or into compatible adapters. Several versions of the format were created, including a rewritable one that allows new titles to be downloaded to a card. While substantially cheaper to produce than cartridges, the storage limitations of the format resulted in Sega exclusively distributing games on cartridges. Despite the failure of the Sega Card, NEC found more success with its own memory card format, the HuCard, which was the primary storage medium for its PC Engine game console.

== History ==
The format was originally released to the Japanese market in 1985 under the name My Card. Initially it was for use with the SC-3000 and the SG-1000 series of consoles via the Card Catcher accessory. Later, the Sega Mark III and the original Master System had built-in card slots. The intention of the format was to provide cheaper distribution means than the more conventional game cartridges. The Sega Card product required less material and has smaller packaging. While cheaper than cartridges, they had significantly smaller maximum storage capacities than cartridges of the time (4 to 32 KB of ROM versus 16 to 512 KB of ROM.) As games became larger, card releases gradually ceased. The final release was Woody Pop, released on 15 March 1987 in Japan.

Sega published only a dozen games in the format for the Mark III/Master System (in 1986–1987) before returning solely to game cartridges. The Master System II, a revised model of the console, has no Sega Card support, and all Sega Card games released in Europe were eventually re-released in cartridge format.

There were experiments with using the cards in arcade machines by Sega to build synergy effects between home consoles and arcades, but it never went far.

Similar but incompatible formats, also manufactured by Mitsubishi Plastics, were used by other computers and consoles: the Bee Card on the MSX, and the HuCard on the NEC PC Engine/TurboGrafx.

== Technical data ==
- Capacity up to 32 KB
- Thickness of about 2mm
- 35-pin (pin 17, pin 19 ground)

== Types ==
There are four versions of the card. The original My Card was released for Sega's SG-1000 console (SG-1000 and SG-1000 II) and SC-3000 series (SC-3000 and SC-3000H). The cards are also compatible with the Tsukuda Original Othello Multivision, a licensed SG-1000 console and the SG-1000-compatible Pioneer SD-G5 peripheral.

The second version of the card was for the Sega's Japan-only Mark III. The Mark III is also backward compatible with SG-1000 My Cards. The third version of the card, called the "Sega Card" was released for the Master System, the international version of the Mark III. The Power Base Converter has a card slot allowing for use of the cards on the Mega Drive/Genesis.

The final version of the format was the My Card EP, a rewritable version that was test marketed only in Japan.

=== SG-1000 My Card ===
The Card Catcher peripheral allows for use of the cards with the SG-1000. A limited-edition version of the Card Catcher was bundled with two games, Zoom 909 and Dragon Wang. The games were also sold separately from the Card Catcher and allowed players to send away for a free adapter at the time.

The original SG-1000 models (SG-1000 and SG-1000 II) and the SC-3000 series (SC-3000 and SC-3000H), along with compatible hardware (the Othello Multivision series and the Pioneer SD-G5) do not have built-in card slots, as they were released before the original My Card. Instead, they require the Card Catcher to be placed in the cartridge slot to use card-based games.

Card releases are distinguished from cartridge releases by their part numbers. Standard SG-1000 releases sport a 4-digit number, G-10XX, with a unique two-digit number at the end. Card releases only have a two digit number, C-XX. The numbering from the cartridge releases was continued with the card releases though, with subsequent card releases being given two-digit numbers that are higher than those from cartridge releases. Games released both on cartridges and cards retain the unique two digit number with the "10" removed from the part number (e.g. The cartridge version of Golf Champion is given the number G-1005 while the My Card release was given the number C-05).

The successor to the SG-1000, the Sega Mark III was released in October 1985 and was backward compatible with both SG-1000 cartridges and My Cards. The subsequent international version of the Mark III, the Master System retained compatibility with My Card software, though Japanese software is incompatible on non-Japanese hardware. However, the Power Base Converter, which allows Master System software to be run on Sega's Mega Drive/Genesis only retains compatibility with Mark III/Master System My Cards.

=== My Card Mark III / Sega Card ===
The successor to the SG-1000 card format is the Mark III My Card. With the October 1985 release of the Sega Mark III, all games were initially available as My Cards. But with 1986's arrival of "Gold Cartridge" branded releases, Sega started transitioning to the cartridge as the primary distribution media. By 1987, games had stopped being released in the My Card Mark III format.

Outside Japan, My Card Mark III was released under the name "Sega Card", with the 1986 release of the Western version of Mark III, the Master System. Subsequent versions of the Master System, including the Master System II are missing the card slot. The Power Base Converter allows Sega Cards and My Cards to be used with the Mega Drive/Genesis. The card format is mostly region locked, preventing non-Japanese hardware from playing Japanese My Cards. This is not the case for Japanese hardware. However, Woody Pop is the only Japanese card release compatible with any system capable of playing My Cards/Sega Cards. F-16 Fighter (F-16 Fighting Falcon in some editions) requires legacy hardware from the SG-1000 that is not included in the Mega Drive/Genesis, and is the only Sega Card not compatible with the Power Base Converter.

=== My Card EP ===
In 1985, Sega released another version of the card in Japan called the My Card EP (short for EPROM), a rewritable version of the format. Sega promoted the My Card EP using flyers and newspaper advertisements and pilot tested it at Tokyo's Tamagawa Takashimaya Futakotamagawa.

Dealers were to install EPROM rewriting machines at retail locations, while users would bring their card and write other games onto it. Players were charged a fee that was lower than that of a retail game. Cards initially cost 5000 yen each, while rewrites on the card cost 1800 yen. The back of the cards did not have the silver sticker from standard My Cards.

The format was not commercially successful and was abandoned. Since then, the cards are quite rare and have fetched high prices at auction.

Games were released onto the EP format at the same time as they were released onto standard My Cards. New My Card EPs came with either Dragon Wang or Star Jacker pre-written on the card, with the below titles available for rewriting.

- Star Jacker (Sutajakka) (スタージャッカー)
- Borderline
- Safari Hunting
- Sega Flipper
- Pacar
- Safari Race
- Sindbad Mystery
- Penguin Land
- Dragon Wang
- Gulkave
- Teddy Boy Blues (Mark III only)
- Great Baseball (Mark III only)
- Great Soccer (Mark III only)
- Astro Flash (Mark III only, also known as TransBot outside Japan)

== List of compatible consoles ==
Model name	My Card	My Card Mark III	Sega Card (Non-Japanese for My Card Mark III)	My Card EP	Comment(s)
SG-1000 (Sega)	Yes	No	No	Yes	Requires Card Catcher.
SG-1000 II (Sega)	Yes	No	No	Yes	Requires Card Catcher. Only released in Japan.
SC-3000 (Sega)	Yes	No	No	Yes	Requires Card Catcher.
SC-3000H (Sega)	Yes	No	No	Yes	Requires Card Catcher.
Othello Multivision (FG-1000) (Tsukuda Original)	Yes	No	No	Yes	Requires Card Catcher. Only released in Japan.
Othello Multivision (FG-2000) (Tsukuda Original)	Yes	No	No	Yes	Requires Card Catcher. Only released in Japan.
SD-G5 (Pioneer)	Yes	No	No	Yes	Requires Card Catcher. Only released in Japan.
Sega Mark III (Sega)	Yes	Yes	Yes	Yes	
Master System	No	Partial	Yes	Yes	Japanese My Card games are not supported except for Woody Pop.
Mega Adapter/Power Base Converter/Master System Converter (Sega)	No	Partial	Partial	Partial	Original My Cards and F-16 Fighting Falcon are not supported.
Master Gear Converter (Sega)	No	Yes	Yes	Yes	Requires Card Catcher + Mark III to Master System adapter. Not released in Japan.

== Sega AI Computer ==
The Sega AI Computer also used Sega Cards, but it is not compatible with any of the cards used in other systems.
