= Alex Kid =

Alex Kid may refer to:

- Alex da Kid (born 1982), British hip hop music producer
- Alex Kidd, a Sega video game character
- Kid Alex, a stage name of Boys Noize, a German electronic music producer and DJ
