= Anmitsu Hime =

Japanese manga series and media franchise

- Cover of the second DVD box for the anime

あんみつ姫
- Genre: Fantasy, Comedy
- Manga
- Written by: Shosuke Kurakane
- Published by: Kobunsha
- Magazine: Shōjo
- Original run: May 1949 – April 1955
- Volumes: 4
- Live-action film

Anmitsu Hime: Amakara no Shiro Maki あんみつ姫・甘辛城の巻
- Directed by: Shigeo Nakagi
- Music by: Nobuaki Asai
- Released: November 10, 1954
- Live-action film

Anmitsu Hime: Amakara no Shiro Maki あんみつ姫・甘辛城の巻
- Directed by: Shigeo Nakagi
- Music by: Nobuaki Asai
- Released: November 23, 1954
- Live-action film

Warrior Training of Anmitsu Hime あんみつ姫の武者修行
- Directed by: Tatsuho Osone
- Music by: Mitsuo Kato
- Studio: Shochiku
- Released: December 27, 1960
- Television drama

Anmitsu Hime: Yōjutsu Kurabe no Maki あんみつ姫・妖術競べの巻
- Original network: KRT
- Original run: December 1, 1958 – October 28, 1960
- Episodes: 100
- Live-action television film
- Directed by: Akihiro Oguro
- Written by: Keiji Okutsu
- Studio: Telepack; Fuji Television
- Original network: FNS (Fuji TV)
- Released: May 23, 1983
- Live-action television film
- Directed by: Akihiro Oguro
- Written by: Keiji Okutsu
- Studio: Telepack; Fuji Television
- Original network: FNS (Fuji TV)
- Released: October 17, 1983
- Live-action television film
- Directed by: Shuji Sugimura
- Written by: Keiji Okutsu
- Studio: Telepack; Fuji Television
- Original network: FNS (Fuji TV)
- Released: January 9, 1984
- Manga
- Written by: Izumi Takemoto
- Published by: Kodansha
- Magazine: Nakayoshi
- Original run: September 1986 – October 1987
- Volumes: 4
- Anime television series

Sugar Princess
- Directed by: Masami Annō (chief)
- Produced by: Yoshitaki Suzuki (Studio Pierrot); Ryūnosuke Endō (Fuji TV); Kyōtarō Kimura (Yomiko)
- Written by: Yoshio Urasawa
- Music by: Kan Ogasawara
- Studio: Studio Pierrot
- Original network: FNS (Fuji TV)
- Original run: October 5, 1986 – September 27, 1987
- Episodes: 51
- Live-action television film
- Directed by: Masaki Nishiura
- Produced by: Sumi Asano
- Written by: Yoshihiro Izumi
- Studio: Fuji Television; FCC
- Released: January 6, 2008
- Live-action television film
- Directed by: Masaki Nishiura
- Produced by: Sumi Asano
- Written by: Yoshihiro Izumi
- Studio: Fuji Television; FCC
- Released: January 11, 2009

Anmitsu Hime (あんみつ姫; "Princess Anmitsu") is a manga series by Shosuke Kurakane. The original manga was serialized between 1949 and 1955. In 1986, Izumi Takemoto retold the original manga series, releasing it under the same title and simultaneously with the anime adaptation.

== Plot ==
Anmitsu is a beautiful princess living happily at the Amakara Castle. She is a tomboy and doesn't act very ladylike. When Anmitsu turns ten years old, her parents present her with a tutor named Castella, who's from the Pudding Kingdom, in hopes of getting Anmitsu more serious about being a princess. Nonetheless, Anmitsu is still up to her usual antics and frequently escapes from the castle to have fun. However, she learns many things about the world outside the castle and about life in general in her adventures. She also makes new friends and continues to cause trouble for the royalty in Amakara Castle.

== Media ==
=== Manga ===
The manga by Shosuke Kurakane was published in Kobunsha's Shōjo magazine from 1949 to 1955. The series helped boost the magazine's circulation to 700,000 copies. It was one of the most popular manga of the early 1950s.

=== Live-action adaptations ===
The first adaptations of Anmitsu Hime came in 1954 with two films. Both starred Izumi Yukimura as Anmitsu Hime. Another film was made in 1960, but with an entirely new staff and cast, starring Haruko Wanibuchi as Animtsu Hime.

==== Live-action television dramas ====
- The first TV drama series was broadcast in 1958–1960, featuring Misao Nakahara as Princess Anmitsu.
- The second TV drama series was broadcast in 1983–1984, featuring Kyōko Koizumi as Princess Anmitsu.
- The third TV drama mini-series was broadcast in 2008 and 2009 in the form of two television specials. They feature Mao Inoue as Princess Anmitsu.

=== Anime television series ===
An anime adaptation was originally planned in 1961 but was cancelled because of cost issues. The adaptation was finally realized 25 years later. Titled in English as Sugar Princess, the show was made by Studio Pierrot (with planning cooperation from Tatsunoko Production, who produced the show that previously was in Anmitsu-hime's timeslot: Mirai Keisatsu Urashiman) that aired on Fuji TV from October 5, 1986, to September 27, 1987, for a 51-episode run. The broadcast time is from 18:00 to 18:30 on Sunday, it is the time zone which is assigned to "Chibi Maruko-chan" since 1990.

The series is about a tomboy princess in the late Edo-period world, but with modern-day technology. This anime is tied up with the "Dream Factory" and "Sunset Meow Meow" that were planned by Fuji TV at that time, stories of Princess Anmitsu visiting the "Dream Factory" appears in this anime, and theme songs are also sung by the Onyanko Club.

Theme songs

- Opening theme : Koi wa Question
  Singer : Onyanko Club / Lyricist : Yasushi Akimoto / Composer : Akira Mitake / Arranger : Akira Mitake
- Ending theme : "Anmitsu Great Strategy" (あんみつ大作戦, Anmitsu Dai Sakusen)
  Singer : Onyanko Club / Lyricist : Yasushi Akimoto / Composer : Hiro Nagasawa / Arranger : Etsuko Yamakawa

==== Anime staff ====
- Director : Masami Annō
- Series composition : Yoshio Urasawa
- Scenario : Yoshio Urasawa, Yoshiyuki Suga
- Character design : Kōji Nanke
- Music : Kan Ogasawara
- Sound director : Fusanobu Fujiyama
- Animation director : Yoshiyuki Kishi
- Art director : Torao Arai
- Producer : Yoshitaki Suzuki (Studio Pierrot), Ryūnosuke Endō (Fuji TV), Kyōtarō Kimura (Yomiko Advertising)
- Planning : Kazuo Shimamura (Yomiko Advertising)
- Production Desk : Ken Hagino

==== Anime cast ====
- Princess Anmitsu : Mami Koyama
- Awanodango no Kami : Takuzō Kamiyama
- Shibucha : Hisako Kyōda
- Hikozaemon Abekawa : Jōji Yanami
- Court Lady Ohagi : Reiko Suzuki
- Kaki no Tanesuke : Shigeru Chiba
- Amaguri no Suke : Yūko Mita
- Manjū : Yuriko Fuchizaki
- Shiomame : Sakurako Hoshino
- Sembei : Tesshō Genda
- Gen'ai Hiraga : Kei Tomiyama
- Narrator : Tomoko Ōno

=== Video game ===
A Master System video game based on the series was made, and translated for the Europe, North America and Oceania markets as Alex Kidd in High-Tech World, with the main character replaced with Alex Kidd and other characters and parts of the game slightly edited to fit the change from a female to a male protagonist; where as the goal of Anmitsu Hime is to reach a cake shop in time before it closes, the localized version changes this to a game center.
