= Nakawa (disambiguation) =

Nakawa is an area in the city of Kampala, Uganda's capital.

Nakawa may also refer to:

- Nakawa Division, one of the divisions that makes up the city of Kampala, Uganda
- Israel Al-Nakawa, better known as Israel Alnaqua (?-1391), an ethical writer and martyr who lived in Toledo, Spain
- Shōsuke Nakawa (b. 1931), a Japanese playwright and theater director
- Nakawa (moth), a genus of moth in the family of Thyrididae
- Nakawa (lion), a lion that had been in Liuwa Plain National Park, Zambia
