= Zillion (TV series) =

Japanese anime television series

- Official Blu Ray-DVD cover in North America from Funimation
- 赤い光弾ジリオン
- Genre: Adventure; Sci-fi
- Developed by: Tsunehisa Itō
- Directed by: Mizuho Nishikubo
- Music by: Jun Irie
- Opening theme: "Pure Stone" by Risa Yūki
- Ending theme: "Push"; by Risa Yūki; (#1–16); "Rock Candy"; by Risa Yūki; (#17–31)
- Country of origin: Japan
- Original language: Japanese
- No. of episodes: 31

Production
- Executive producer: Ippei Kuri
- Producers: Hidehiko Takei; Minoru Ōno; Hiroshi Iwata
- Editors: Chihiro Yoshida; Sachiko Miki
- Production company: Tatsunoko Production

Original release
- Network: NNS (NTV)
- Release: April 12 – December 13, 1987

Related
Further information
Original video animation
Zillion: Burning Night
Directed by	Mizuho Nishikubo
Produced by	Jōji Furusawa; Motoki Ueda
Written by	Mizuho Nishikubo
Music by	Jun Irie
Studio	I.G. Tatsunoko
Licensed by	Crunchyroll
Released	June 21, 1988
Runtime	45 minutes
Video games
Zillion (1987); Zillion II: The Tri Formation (1988)

Zillion, known in Japan as Red Photon Zillion (Japanese: 赤い光弾ジリオン, Hepburn: Akai Kōdan Jirion; lit. "Red Photon Bullet Zillion"), is a Japanese anime television series produced by Tatsunoko Production that ran from April 12 to December 13, 1987, on Nippon Television, comprising 31 episodes.

== Plot ==
The story takes place on the planet Maris in the year 2387. Around this time, the Nohzas (ノーザ, Nōza) civilization, led by Empress Admis, started a genocide program to kill all humans in order to lay eggs and reproduce on the planet. Three mysterious guns dubbed the "Zillion Weapon System" appear and three teen soldiers (JJ, Champ, and Apple) are chosen to wield them as a task force called White Nuts (ホワイトナッツ, Howaito Nattsu) (W.N.) (known as the White Knights in the English version), whose purpose is to fight back against the Nohzas.

=== Main characters ===
Characters of Zillion

- JJ is the series' 16-year-old main protagonist and third member of the White Nuts. He is an avid fighter.
- Champ (チャンプ Chanpu) is the 18-year-old primary leader of the White Nuts.
- Apple (アップル Appuru) is the 17-year-old female member and navigator of the White Nuts.
- Amy Harrison (エイミ・ハリソン Eimi Harison) is a primary assistant of Mr. Gord. She has a liking for J.J.
- Mr. Gord (Mr.ゴード Mr. Gōdo) is the commissioner/commander of the White Nuts.
- Dave (デイブ Deibu) is a mechanic and assistant pilot, later member of the White Nuts.
- Opa-Opa (a character inherited from Sega's Fantasy Zone series) is White Nuts' companion robot and ally, and later member of the White Nuts.
- Bernstein (バーンスタイン) is the commander in Chief of Maris.

=== Nohzas ===
- Admis (アドミス) is an empress of the Nohza Empire.
- Baron Ricks (バロン・リックス) is the main antagonist of the story and a leader of the invasion troops.
- Navarro (ナバロ) is a big Nohza soldier, filled with micromissiles, specially created to fight against the White Nuts, one of the three Nohza Warriors (N.W.).
- Solar (ソラール) is a flying Nohza woman, also specially built to fight the White Nuts, the second N.W., shaped somewhat like a wasp.
- Gurdock (ガードック) is a soldier with stretchable arms, the third Nohza Warrior created to counter the White Nuts.

== Cast ==
Character	Japanese	English
J.J.	Toshihiko Seki	Doug Stone
Champ	Kazuhiko Inoue	Kerrigan Mahan
Apple	Yūko Mizutani	Barbara Goodson
Amy	Chieko Honda	Wendee Lee
Dave	Daiki Nakamura	Eddie Frierson
Gord	Yuzuru Fujimoto	Michael Forest
Bernstein; Narrator	Osamu Kobayashi	Tom Wyner
Baron Ricks	Show Hayami	Doug Stone

== Equipment ==
Equipment of the White Nuts team:

- Zillion (ジリオン) is a mysterious weapon, impossible to analyze and reproduce. It fires a load of a strange substance, appearing as a red light that engulfs the target and disintegrates it. It uses a small red crystal ("zillionium") for ammunition, unstable and also impossible to reproduce. One of the guns is destroyed in episode 10 and reconstructed afterwards by Dave, changing its initially "flat" design to a more ergonomic one. All pistols are then rebuilt, allowing the use of special accessories that change them into a sub machine-gun, used by Apple, or a precision sniper rifle, used by Champ.
- Ridingcepter (ライディングセプター) is a motorcycle an can carry a Sidecepter (サイドセプター), a Cargocepter (カーゴセプター) or a Cannoncepter (キャノンセプター).
- Tricharger (トライチャージャー) is a tricycle that can change into a versatile mobile suit. It has three forms, buggy form (バギーフォーム), kneeled form (ニールドフォーム) and armoretter form (アーモレーターフォーム).
- Big Porter (ビッグポーター) is a Vertical Take Off and Landing vehicle, prepared to carry one of three special crafts, named:
  - Submarine Aqua-Carried (潜航艇アクアキャリッド), a yellow small submersible
  - Armoured Vehicle Land-Carried (装甲車ランドキャリッド), a red battle tank
  - Fighter Bomber Aero-Carried (戦闘爆撃機エアロキャリッド), a blue air-and-space fighter

== Development ==
After the production of the anime, Tatsunoko and Mitsuhisa Ishikawa, the producer of Zillion, established I.G. Tatsunoko (which later became Production I.G) to obstruct the dispersing of the excellent staffs of Tatsunoko branch which had done actual production. Therefore, Zillion is considered to be Production I.G's first work.

The anime's mechanical designs were done by Studio "Ammonite".

== Media ==
=== Anime ===
Despite the cult success of the video games, the Zillion anime received only a brief release in the early 1990s in the United States. The first five episodes of the TV series, as well as the Burning Night OVA, were dubbed and released on VHS by Streamline Pictures. The anime was featured in the music video for Michael and Janet Jackson's collaboration "Scream". Samples from the English dub of the anime were also featured in Del the Funky Homosapien's single "Cyberpunks".

In 2018, Funimation has released the complete series and the OVA on a Blu-ray/DVD set with Japanese audio and English subtitles.

=== List of episodes ===
1. "My Name Is J.J." (US title: "They Call Me, J.J.") (original airdate: April 12, 1987): written by Tsunehisa Ito
2. "Attack the Enemy of the High Skies" (US title: "Hang Fire") (original airdate: April 19, 1987): written by Tsunehisa Ito
3. "0.1 Second Chance!" (US title: "Split—Second Chance") (original airdate: April 26, 1987): written by Haruya Yamazaki
4. "Trap of the Shapeless Ninja Squadron" (US title: "Target, The White Knights") (original airdate: May 3, 1987): written by Tsunehisa Ito
5. "Apple Order Violation!?" (US title: "Judgement Call") (original airdate: May 10, 1987): written by Mami Watanabe
6. "Take Off, Tricharger" (original airdate: May 17, 1987): written by Haruya Yamazaki
7. "Struggle 'Til Death! J.J. vs. Ricks" (original airdate: May 24, 1987): written by Tsunehisa Ito
8. "Strike the Oceanfloor Base!" (original airdate: May 31, 1987): written by Mami Watanabe
9. "Stolen Zillion" (original airdate: June 7, 1987): written by Mami Watanabe
10. "Flames! Ricks' Counterattack" (original airdate: June 14, 1987): written by Tsunehisa Ito
11. "Birth of New Zillion!" (original airdate: June 21, 1987): written by Tsunehisa Ito
12. "Attack! Triple Shoot" (original airdate: June 28, 1987): written by Haruya Yamazaki
13. "Angry Shutter Chance" (original airdate: July 5, 1987): written by Mami Watanabe
14. "Nightingale of the Battlefield" (original airdate: July 12, 1987): written by Tsunehisa Ito
15. "Life Or Death!? Confrontation of Fate—Part. 1" (original airdate: July 19, 1987): written by Haruya Yamazaki
16. "Life Or Death!? Confrontation of Fate—Part. 2" (original airdate: July 26, 1987): written by Haruya Yamazaki
17. "Tears! Let's Search J.J." (original airdate: September 6, 1987): written by Mami Watanabe
18. "The Beautiful Noza's Challenge" (original airdate: September 13, 1987): written by Tsunehisa Ito
19. "Match! Let's Throw the Coin" (original airdate: September 20, 1987): written by Haruya Yamazaki
20. "Kick with a Broken Heart" (original airdate: September 27, 1987): written by Mami Watanabe
21. "Clash! The Sniper" (original airdate: October 4, 1987): written by Takao Koyama
22. "Great Victory from a Lie!" (original airdate: October 11, 1987): written by Takashi Yamada
23. "Terror! Demon's Bio Weapon" (original airdate: October 18, 1987): written by Tsunehisa Ito
24. "Great Adventure! Warrior Opa-Opa" (original airdate: October 25, 1987): written by Mami Watanabe
25. "Gentle Fugitive Apple" (original airdate: November 1, 1987): written by Takashi Yamada
26. "Revenge Demon Ninja!" (original airdate: November 8, 1987): written by Haruya Yamazaki
27. "Extraordinary Rebel Ricks" (original airdate: November 15, 1987): written by Mami Watanabe
28. "Mystery!? Zillion Power" (original airdate: November 22, 1987): written by Mami Watanabe
29. "Heroic! Ricks Dies!?" (original airdate: November 29, 1987): written by Tsunehisa Ito
30. "Planet Maris on the Corner!" (original airdate: December 6, 1987): written by Tsunehisa Ito
31. "Last Shoot for Victory" (original airdate: December 13, 1987): written by Tsunehisa Ito

=== OVA ===
VHS cover of the Zillion: Burning Night OVA

Zillion: Burning Night, known in Japan as Red Photon Zillion: Songstress's Nocturne (赤い光弾ジリオン 歌姫夜曲, Akai Kodan Jirion Utahime Yakyoku), is a Japanese direct-to-video anime release by Tatsunoko. It is also referred to as Red Bullet Zillion: Burning Night and Zillion: Burning Night Special. It was released on June 21, 1988.

According to Toshinori Otsuri, it is inspired by Streets of Fire.

==== Plot ====
In the peaceful aftermath of the Nozsa wars, the charismatic heroes known as "White Nuts" have changed career paths to becoming music making rock stars. Their music career is soon interrupted by a new threat of colonial settlers. Apple is kidnapped by ODAMA Clan, a family of ruthless killers. Located in a heavily fortified mountain retreat, J.J. and company attempt a rescue mission with their laser weapon Zillion, but the former Knights only have a limited supply of Zillium for the Zillion guns. A mysterious stranger named Rick, a wondering bodyguard for the ODAMA Clan, turns out to be an old lover of Apple.

=== Video games ===
A Zillion-themed toy gun

Two games were made based on the series, both by Sega for the Master System: Zillion, an action game similar in play style to Metroid and Impossible Mission, and a sequel, Zillion II: The Tri Formation, which was a faster-paced game involving a powered armor mecha which transformed into a motorcycle.

=== Publications ===
Zillion Creations 1 and Zillion Creations 2 were released in 1987 and 1988, respectively. These books offer an in-depth look at the equipment and characters from the series.

In 1993, Eternity Comics published a comic book adaptation of the series, written by Tom Mason and illustrated by Harrison Fong.

=== Toy ===
A Zillion-based laser tag toy line also by Sega was released in Japan and Brazil. The design of the gun, which was featured in the series released in 1987, was reused from the Master System Light Phaser light gun, which was released in 1986 in North America, Europe and Brazil.

Later in the series, Sega and Tatsunoko changed the design of the anime series' guns, simultaneous with a cosmetic change in the laser tag guns on which they were based.

In 2009, a Brazilian man used the toy in a hostage crisis situation where a woman was held for more than 10 hours. The Guinness World Records Gamer's Edition 2010 cited it as the "Longest police stand-off with a videogame peripheral".
