= Woody Pop =

1987 video game

- Game Gear cover art by Greg Martin
- Developer: Sega
- Publisher: Sega
- Platforms: Master System, Game Gear
- Release: Master System: JP: March 15, 1987; Game Gear: JP: March 1, 1991; NA: 1991; EU: 1991
- Genre: Block breaker
- Mode: Single-player

Woody Pop (ウッディポップ 新人類のブロックくずし, Woody Pop: Shinjinrui no Block Kuzushi) is a ball and paddle game similar to Breakout and Arkanoid. It was released exclusively in Japan for the Master System in 1987, before an international release on the Game Gear in 1991. The Master System version of the game requires a custom paddle controller which came with the game. Woody Pop was the last game released in Japan with the Mark III branding and on a My Card.

== Gameplay ==
Players control a cartoon rendition of a tree spirit in the form of a log named Woody. His mission is to use a ball to break down block barriers set up by an enemy known as The Mad Machine inside the Mansion Toy Factory. The barriers consist of normal blocks and special "mystery" blocks that release hazards such as toy soldiers and wind up robots, both of which will obstruct and deflect the ball in crazy ways back at Woody. There are also special blocks that grant Woody powers such as a Flameball, a skull, a hammer and even magic potions. Other features include a train that on some screens serves as a screen wide moving obstacle to players' progress and bottom screen corners that can deflect the ball back up the screen. There are 50 different levels in all before the final level, in which players attempt to defeat The Mad Machine. One difference between Woody Pop and most Breakout-style games is that players have as many as three different levels between which they can choose to advance after finishing a level, making the game less linear.

Woody Pop on the Sega Mark III and Master System is controlled with a special paddle controller that, like the game, was only sold in Japan.
