= Pit Pot =

1985 video game

- Developer: Sega
- Publisher: Sega
- Designer: Toshinori Asai (producer/programmer)
- Composer: Hiroshi Kawaguchi
- Platform: Master System
- Release: JP: December 14, 1985; EU: October 1987
- Genre: Puzzle
- Modes: Single-player, multiplayer

Pit Pot is a video game developed by Sega for the Master System. The Japanese version was released in 1985. It was only released as a combo with Astro Warrior in a double cart in European regions in 1987 but was released as a stand-alone game in Japan.

== Gameplay ==
The player is introduced to the game with a short cut scene showing that a princess has been kidnapped and held captive inside a castle by an evil witch. The players mission is to enter the castle and rescue the princess. In order to successfully rescue her, the following items must be found: a cross to prevent her from turning into a witch, a potion to wake her up, and a ring to get her to marry the player. These items are hidden in a maze, separated into separate rooms that are static (i.e. no scrolling). The number of rooms depends on the level of difficulty. Along the way, the player will face monsters and puzzles. Using a magic hammer, the player can squash the enemies, and smash tiles into the bottomless pit. The monsters regenerate at a predetermined respawn spot, similar to Pac-Man, so the player must move quickly.

The game ends when the player loses all lives. The game also ends when the player does not have all items to save the Princess, regardless of his lives. It's possible to kill the princess, too.

== Release ==
The Japanese version of Pit Pot contains a level editor feature, this was removed from the Western version to accommodate space for Astro Warrior.
