= Sega AI Computer =

1986 computer model

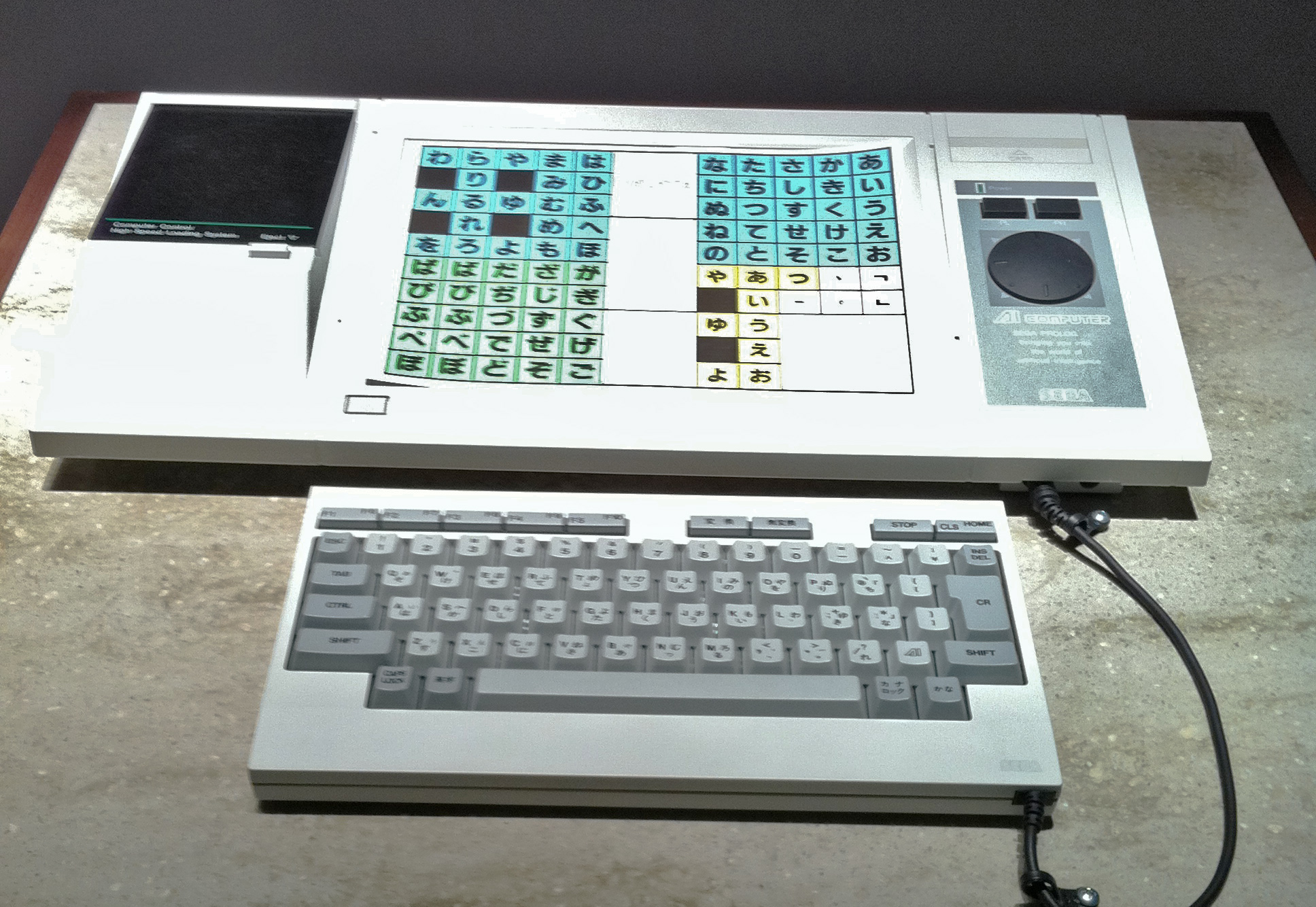
- Sega AI Computer
- Developer: Sega
- Manufacturer: Sega
- Released: 1986
- Discontinued: 1989
- Operating system: Sega Prolog
- CPU: 16-bit NEC V20 @ 5 MHz
- Memory: 128 KB
- Storage: Sega Card
- Display: 256x212, 16 colours
- Graphics: V9938
- Sound: SN76489
- Controller input: Touch surface with overlays, 8-directions pad + 3 buttons.

The Sega AI Computer (AIセガコンピュータ) is a home computer launched by Sega in 1986. It was released in Japan only, with plans to be released in North America under the name Sega DI 8300. Its purpose was to be used in schools, and thus featured only edutainment software. The computer used a large rectangular touchpad that was customizable via custom overlays bundled with most of its programs.

== Technical specifications ==
- CPU: 16-bit NEC V20 at 5 MHz
- ROM: 512 KB total (as actually found in system)
  - 2x64 KB system ROM ("Operating System, Prolog")
  - 1x128 KB character ROM
  - 2x128 KB speech ROM
- RAM: 128 KB
- Software on Sega My Cards (128 KB to 256 KB).
- Software on audio cassettes.
- Video : Yamaha V9938 (Resolution 256x212) with 64 KB VRAM.
- Sound: SN76489 PSG
- Inputs: Touch surface with overlays, 8-directions pad + 3 buttons.
- Inputs: Microphone input.
- Inputs/Outputs: a RS232 Centronics port
- Cassette drive : 9.6 kb/s.
- Optional keyboard peripheral.
- Optional Sound Box peripheral with a YM2151 FM chip.

== Emulation ==
It was emulated in 2024 by the MAME emulator.

== Software ==
There are 22 known releases.

Title	Release year
AI Enikki	1986
Alice World	1988
Andersen Dream	1988
Arabian Night	1988
Cinderella Labyrinth	1988
Columbus Map	1988
Cosmic Train	1988
English Wonder School: Eigo de Game - Popo's Adventure	1989
English Wonder School: Eigo de Ohanashi - Folk & Fairy Tales	1989
Gulliver Pocket	1988
Mozart Academy	1988
Ocean Fantasy	1988
Pinpon Pasokon: Pinpon Music Melody	1987
Pinpon Pasokon: Pinpon Music Rhythm	1987
Pinpon Pasokon: Pinpon Numbers	1987
Ranran Melody	1988
Robinson Land	1988
Runrun Music	1988
Surasura Moji Wonder School: Henshin Kanji	1988
Surasura Moji Wonder School: Okeiko Hanamaru Aiueo	1988
Surasura Moji Wonder School: WakuWaku ABC to 123	1988
Tantan Rhythm	1988
