= Super Tennis (Master System) =

1985 video game

- Developer: Sega
- Publisher: Sega
- Platform: Master System
- Release: JP: 22 December 1985; NA: December 1986; EU: August 1987
- Genre: Sports (tennis)
- Modes: Single-player, multiplayer

Super Tennis is a 1985 tennis video game developed and published by Sega for the Master System. It was known in Japan as Great Tennis (グレートテニス). It was released as a Sega Card, and additionally as a cartridge in Europe.
