= Alex Kidd in Miracle World DX =

2021 video game

- Cover for the Nintendo Switch version
- Developer: Jankenteam
- Publisher: Merge Games
- Series: Alex Kidd
- Engine: Unity
- Platforms: Nintendo Switch; PlayStation 4; PlayStation 5; Windows; Xbox One; Xbox Series X/S
- Release: June 22, 2021
- Genre: Platform game
- Mode: Single-player

Alex Kidd in Miracle World DX is a 2021 platform game developed by Jankenteam and published by Merge Games. A remake of the 1986 video game Alex Kidd in Miracle World, the game was released on various consoles such as the Nintendo Switch, along with it releasing on Steam. It was first revealed in June 2020, and released in June 2021.

== Premise ==
The player plays as Alex Kidd, with the game featuring various boss fights and obstacles for it to go through. The game also features modern graphics, with an option to go back to the 1986 game's graphics within the settings. The game introduces new mechanics and features such as NPCs.

== Development and release ==
Developer Jankenteam was based in Spain. The game was announced on June 10, 2020, at an IGN Expo following a trailer revealed alongside. In April 2021, a release date was set for June 24 alongside a trailer and a list of consoles compatible with the game. On June 8, a trailer was released and an updated release date came along as well. The game released on June 22, 2021 on Steam and then later consoles.

== Reception ==
Reception

Aggregate scores
Aggregator	Score
Metacritic	65/100
OpenCritic	29% recommend

Review scores
Publication	Score
Destructoid	7/10
Eurogamer	7/10
IGN	7/10 (France); 8.5/10 (Italy)
Jeuxvideo.com	12/20
Push Square	4/10
Digitally Downloaded	3.5/5
Multiplayer.it	7/10

According to review aggregator website Metacritic, Alex Kidd in Miracle World DX received "mixed or average" reviews, based on 31 reviews. OpenCritic determined that 29% of critics recommend the game.

Chris Moyse of Destructoid praised the remake for being a "visually gorgeous upgrade to a very rose-tinted release." Moyse also states that "Jankenteam accentuates the positives, reimagining one of console gaming’s earliest universes with stunning artwork, great animation, and a sophisticated score." Nicholas Mercurio, reviewing for the Italian branch of Eurogamer also praises the remake, saying, "It represents a profound opportunity for anyone to discover a gem that became famous on the Master System, a title that sought to respond to Mario and many other video games of the era, before Sonic became the icon of SEGA." Reviewing the game for Digitally Downloaded, Alex Kidman points out, "Using either infinite lives or patience with continues you’ll clock everything it has to show you in just a few short hours of gameplay."

Other negative reviews said that the controls were either buggy, or the fact that there are levels that are "annoying" to beat. Brett Posner-Ferdman of Push Square rates the game four out of ten, saying the gameplay "falls flat, with boring and dated level design, terrible enemy placement, and some of the worst hit-detection in recent memory." A.J. Maciejewski of videochums.com states that it has "much stiffer controls and an incredibly unforgiving hitbox which means that even being in the vicinity of an enemy can spell your demise."
