= Astro Warrior =

1986 video game

- Developer: Sega
- Publisher: Sega
- Platform: Master System
- Release: JP: 14 December 1986; NA: December 1986; PAL: October 1987
- Genre: Scrolling shooter
- Mode: Single-player

Astro Warrior (Note: Japanese:アストロウォリアー, Heburn: Asutoro Uoriā) is a 1986 vertically scrolling shooter developed and published by Sega for the Master System. The player pilots a spaceship shooting enemies and collecting power-ups to reach the mother ship of an invasion force. It was originally a bundled with the Master System in Europe.

The game received positive reviews for the graphics, weapons and large number of enemies. Retrospective reviews have been mixed, with criticism for the generic situation and lack of variety. The game was re-released on the Hang-On / Astro Warrior compilation in North America, and the Astro Warrior / Pit Pot compilation in Europe. In 1996, Tec Toy re-released the game in Brazil as Sapo Xulé: SOS Lagoa Poluída, and based it on a Brazilian 1980s toy. This version was also released in Portugal.

== Plot ==
The Devil Star Imperial Forces have established a base on and invaded the Alpha Kentowry system. The Solar System Allied Forces have entrusted their Warrior, aboard The Astoro Raider, to attack the invasion force and destroy their mother ship.

== Gameplay ==
A game in progress.

The game is a top down shooter, taking place through three levels with a boss at the end of each. Astro Warrior's three levels have many different kinds of enemies that attack in various patterns. The stages have no obstacles. Power-ups can be collected by shooting targets on the ground. These include ship speed increase, a stronger laser weapon, and two Gradius-style options. Capturing Weapons Supply Ships increases the Astoro Raider's speed and firing ability. The player starts with three lives, and if all are lost, the game is over. If the player dies, all power-ups are lost.

== Release ==
Astro Warrior was originally a bundled game that came with the Master System in Europe.

Astro Warrior was re-released as Sapo Xulé: SOS Lagoa Poluída by Tectoy in Brazil in 1996. The game was also released in Portugal. Sapo Xulé: SOS Lagoa Poluída is based on a popular Brazilian 1980s toy, and set underwater, with the Astoro Raider replaced with a submarine.

== Reception ==
Upon release in the late 1980s, the game received generally positive reviews from contemporary critics. British magazine Computer and Video Games gave it an 82% score. They praised the "extra weapons and "plenty of baddies" to destroy. They said "this freebie is really neat" and is "well worth the effort to get hold of a copy" if "shoot 'em ups are tops in your" house. German magazine Happy Computer gave it a 79% score. They praised the graphics, calling them truly remarkable, and saying the system's colourful sprite varieties are exploited. The English-language site IMPLANTgames, specializing in classic console games, rated "Star Warrior" 4/10 overall, with graphics and gameplay scoring 4/10, and music and sound receiving a slightly higher 6/10. The sound effects and musical accompaniment were noted as the game's only redeeming qualities, while the overall experience was deemed subpar.

In the late 2000s, the game received mixed retrospective reviews from online critics. GameFreaks 365 criticised the game, citing the background, "worthless" bosses, and the game being too generic, but complimented the "nicely done" colourful presentation. IMPLANTgames criticised the lack of variety, the mediocre enemies, but complimented the music.

== General and cited references ==
- Astro Warrior/Pit Pot manual. Sega. 1987.
