= Zillion (video game) =

1987 video game

- North American cover art
- Developer: Sega
- Publisher: Sega
- Designer: Kotaro Hayashida
- Composer: Tokuhiko Uwabo
- Platform: Master System
- Release: JP: May 24, 1987; EU: October 1987; NA: November 1987
- Genres: Platform, action-adventure
- Mode: Single-player

Zillion, known as Akai Koudan Zillion (赤い光弾ジリオン; lit. Red Photon Zillion) in Japan, is a space adventure platform video game developed by Sega and designed for the Master System as a companion tie-in for Tatsunoko Production's Zillion anime series in 1987.

The Zillion series prominently features Sega's egg-shaped mascot, Opa-Opa, who stars in the Fantasy Zone games, which are also available for the Master System. A sequel to the game, Zillion II, was released in 1988.

== Plot ==
The White Knights, a peacekeeping force within the Planetary System, are on a mission to destroy the evil Nohza (misspelled as "Norsa" in the North American version) Empire's base on Planet X. In order to do so, J.J., the main character from the Zillion anime, must infiltrate the base and acquire the five floppy disks that will enable him to input the self-destruct sequence into the base's mainframe computer. Mothership lands on the surface of the planet, and J.J. must make his way through the labyrinthine base, fighting enemies, avoiding hazards and possibly rescuing two of his captured allies on his way to destroy the base.

== Gameplay ==
J.J. in front of the Mothership on Planet X

The player starts out in the role of J.J., just outside the Mothership on the surface of the planet. After reaching the underground base shortly after beginning, the player spends the rest of the game underground, only coming back up to replenish the character's health or to leave after completing the mission.

Throughout the base, are capsules containing key codes and power-up items. Some of the obstacles of the missions include tripwires, enemy guards, laser turrets and force fields. The game style includes entering and exiting room to room in the base and unlocking each room with computer ID cards and inputting the correct four-digit code, found by investigating capsules in the room. Aside from unlocking rooms, the player has also the option to make specific actions, such as turning off barriers, deactivating traps, or even committing suicide, among others. One of the codes is needed to initiate the Nozha base self-destruct sequence. The game is well known for a variety of "special messages" that can be received if the player inputs certain codes in certain rooms.

The player carries a gun, which was used as a design model for the Master System's Light Phaser. As the game progresses, the gun will become stronger, allowing the player to break progressively stronger capsules containing codes for the computers or powerups. Once they are rescued, the player can also play as Apple or Champ, each one with their own differences; the female Apple is fast, but weaker, and the male Champ is slower, but stronger. Like JJ, they can also find upgrades for their gun power, speed, jumping ability and health.

== Reception ==
Reception

Review score
Publication	Score
The Games Machine	76%

Zillion has been compared to Epyx's Impossible Mission by The Games Machine and GamesTM, in which objects must be inspected to enable things by accessing codes. It has also been compared to Nintendo's Metroid.
