= Snail Maze =

1986 video game

- Developer(s): Sega
- Publisher(s): Sega
- Platform(s): Master System
- Release: NA: September 1986; EU: August 1987
- Genre(s): Maze
- Mode(s): Single-player

Snail Maze is a 1986 maze video game developed and published by Sega for the Master System. Instead of being released on a cartridge, it was built into the BIOS of the non-Japanese versions of the console and could be played by starting the system without a game cartridge inserted and holding Up and buttons 1 and 2 simultaneously, consequently being a launch title for the console in the region. Some later console models included a minimal BIOS because of memory constraints, and Snail Maze had to be removed. These systems instead included a built-in Alex Kidd in Miracle World or Sonic the Hedgehog. Snail Maze was not released in Japan.

== Gameplay ==
A very simple game, Snail Maze involves navigating a small orange snail with a yellow shell through a blue maze. A goal area is clearly marked, which players must attempt to reach within a time limit. Despite its relative simplicity compared to other games of its era, Snail Maze can be quite challenging. Subsequent levels reduce the time available, giving a progressively lower margin for error.

== Legacy ==
A version of Snail Maze was included on the Coleco Sonic handheld system, created in 2006. An emulated version of Snail Maze can be played in various entries of the Like a Dragon series by using an in-game Master System without selecting a game.

In 2004 an unofficial port of Snail Maze was made for the Japanese MSX computer platform with enhanced graphics and a new title screen. An unofficial port Snail Maze was released on iOS in January 2013. An unofficial port of Snail Maze was released in December 2015 for the TI-84 Plus CE graphing calculator, written in eZ80 assembly language. In 2020, Genesis Project created and released a Commodore 64 version of Snail Maze.
