= Penguin Land =

1987 video game

- Developer: Sega
- Publisher: Sega
- Platform: Master System
- Release: JP: August 18, 1987; NA: January 1988; EU: October 1988
- Genre: Puzzle-platform
- Mode: Single-player

Penguin Land, known as Doki Doki Penguin Land Uchū Daibōken (Note: Japanese: どきどきペンギンランド宇宙大冒険, Hepburn: lit. "Thump Thump Penguin Land: Great Outer Space Adventure") in Japan, is a 1987 puzzle-platform game published and developed by Sega for the Master System. It is the second game in the Doki Doki Penguin Land series. The player controls a penguin to guide an egg around polar bears, rocks and other hazards. There are 50 stages and a level editor which can save up to 15 additional levels. The level editor data is stored on the game's battery back-up RAM. Penguin Land was the first home console video game to include a battery backup save feature, its original Japanese version being released four days prior to The Legend of Zelda's US release.

== Plot ==
The game begins where three penguin eggs are lost on a distant planet. The player controls the Penguin Mission Commander Overbite, who must guide these eggs down to the bottom of a frigid cavern filled with traps, enemies, and secret passages. The Spaceship Crew eagerly awaits at the bottom of this cavern to welcome the hero Overbite and carry the eggs to safety.

== Gameplay ==
The object of the game is to successfully push and drop an egg down to the bottom of a vertically scrolling cavern of ice. The player is able to push the egg left and right, push it off cliffs onto lower platforms, and melt ice blocks to create a passage for the egg. If the egg falls more than 3 blocks downward, it will break. Also, if Overbite lands on the egg, but the egg cannot be rolled left or right, the egg will break. The round is completed when the egg is successfully delivered to the bottom of the level.

The block types in the game include ice blocks (which the player can melt), cracked ice (which will melt once the egg is on top of them), Rocks (which can be pushed and dropped on enemies, but will crack the egg if they land on it), stone blocks (which cannot be moved by the player, but occasionally move on their own), and tubes for either the egg or the player to pass through.

Gangows are polar bear-like enemies that will attack both the player and the egg. If they back the egg into a corner or land on the egg, it will break. Cameels are birds that fly by if the egg is not moved after a set time. They will drop a brick which can crack the egg.

Also included are point and time bonuses, egg shields, springs that let you jump higher, and ghosts that invert game controls. Point bonuses are awarded for crushing Gangows, time remaining, and the difficulty of the round completed.

== Reception ==
The game was reviewed in 1988 in Dragon #140 by Hartley, Patricia, and Kirk Lesser in "The Role of Computers" column. The reviewers gave the game 3 out of 5 stars.

=== Reviews ===
- Sega Power (December 1993)
- Joystick (German) (January 1989)
- The Games Machine (October 1988)
- Power Play (October 1988)
- Computer and Video Games (October 1988)
