= Shosuke Kurakane =

Japanese manga artist

Torao Kurakane
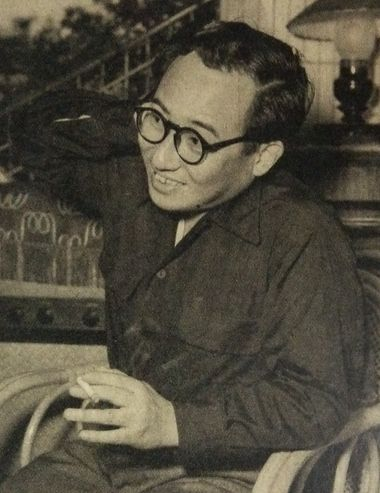
- Born: February 13, 1914; Kofu, Yamanashi, Japan
- Died: August 25, 1973
- Other name: Shosuke Kurakane
- Occupation: Manga artist

Torao Kurakane (倉金 虎雄, Kurakane Torao; February 13, 1914 – August 25, 1973), pen name Shosuke Kurakane (倉金章介, Kurakane Shōsuke) was a Japanese manga artist.

He wrote many works that has been turned into anime, TV drama, and movie but is especially known for Anmitsuhime (あんみつ姫) which was turned into all three. His second best known work, Tentenmusume (てんてん娘), was made into a movie on 1956 with Mariko Miyagi as the heroine and on 1984, it was made into a TV drama with Mayumi Hara in the same role.
