= Alex Kidd =

Video game series

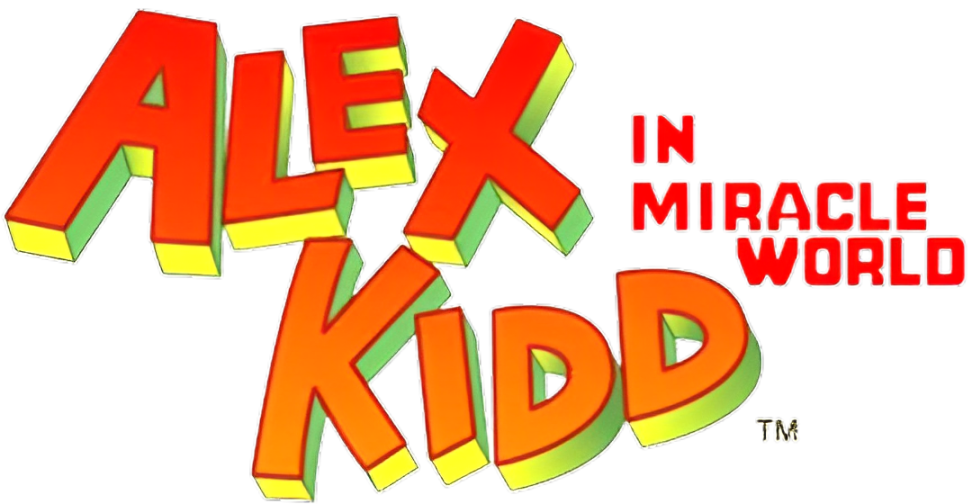
- Genre: Platformer
- Developer: Sega
- Publisher: Sega
- First release: Alex Kidd in Miracle World; November 1, 1986
- Latest release: Alex Kidd in Miracle World DX; June 22, 2021

Alex Kidd (Note: Japanese: アレックス・キッド, Hepburn: Arekkusu Kiddo) is a platform video game series developed by Sega. The title character served as Sega's mascot in the years prior to the creation of Sonic the Hedgehog.

== Games ==
Release timeline
1986	Alex Kidd in Miracle World; Alex Kidd: The Lost Stars
1987	Alex Kidd: High-Tech World
1987	Alex Kidd BMX Trial
1988
1989	Alex Kidd in the Enchanted Castle
1990	Alex Kidd in Shinobi World
1991–2020
2021	Alex Kidd in Miracle World DX

The franchise includes seven titles.

- Alex Kidd in Miracle World - 1986, Master System
- Alex Kidd: The Lost Stars - 1986, Arcade, Master System
- Alex Kidd: High-Tech World - 1987, Master System
- Alex Kidd BMX Trial - 1987, Master System
- Alex Kidd in the Enchanted Castle - 1989, Sega Genesis
- Alex Kidd in Shinobi World - 1990, Master System
- Alex Kidd in Miracle World DX - 2021, PC, Nintendo Switch, PlayStation 4, PlayStation 5, Xbox One, Xbox Series X/S

== History ==
The first game in the series, Alex Kidd in Miracle World, was released in 1986 and built into later versions of the Master System and the Master System II model, replacing the Snail Maze/Safari Hunt/Hang-On games of the first model. This integrated SMSII version reversed the attack and jump buttons from the earlier cartridge version to conform to that of other popular action games of the day. In the original cartridge version, Alex is shown eating Japanese onigiri, but in the SMSII integrated version, it has been changed to a hamburger.

Most games in the Alex Kidd series differ dramatically from one another, the sole exception being Miracle World and its direct sequel, Alex Kidd in the Enchanted Castle. While most games in the series are platform-based, the only elements that tie the series together are the name and the title character. One game in the series, Alex Kidd: High-Tech World, originated as a video game based on a 1980s Japanese animated series airing at the time, Anmitsu Hime, and was rebranded as an Alex Kidd game when released in America and Europe.

After the release of Alex Kidd in Shinobi World in 1990, Sega decided to shift focus towards Sonic the Hedgehog.

A remake of Alex Kidd in Miracle World developed by Merge Games and Jankenteam, Alex Kidd in Miracle World DX, was released on June 22, 2021.

== Legacy ==
Alex Kidd maintained a significant fan following for many years after Sega abandoned the series. In a March 1998 online poll asking visitors which Sega franchise they most wanted to see on the Project Katana console (eventually named the Dreamcast), Alex Kidd came in fifth, beating out the acclaimed and still-current Sega Rally.

Alex Kidd titles have been re-released as part of various Sega video game compilations, including Sonic's Ultimate Genesis Collection and Sega Vintage Collection. The character has also gone on to appear in multiple Sega crossover games, including Segagaga, Sega Superstars Tennis, Sonic & Sega All-Stars Racing, and Sonic & All-Stars Racing Transformed.
