= Zillion II =

1987 video game

- North American cover art
- Developer: Sega
- Publisher: Sega
- Platform: Master System
- Release: JP: December 13, 1987; NA: July 1988; EU: March 1988
- Genre: Platform
- Mode: Single-player

Zillion II: The Tri Formation, known as Tri Formation (トライフォーメーション, lit. Triformation) in Japan, is a horizontal platform video game created in 1987 by Sega and released on the Master System. It is a sequel to the game Zillion.

== Plot ==
A faint distress transmission, barely understandable, was received at the headquarters of the White Knights. Sent from a distant outpost at the extreme edge of the Planetary System, the garbled message told of a new, gigantic Norsa Battle Fortress at the edge of the Norsa Galaxy. Apple and Champ, two members of the elite White Knight special peacekeeping force, immediately set out on a reconnaissance mission to investigate the Norsa Fortress. The last words which anybody heard from Apple and Champ were: "Help us J.J.! Baron Ricks has...". JJ is now up against the new Norsa Empire facing Olivion Platoon Captain Radajian Defense Leader, the Alleevian Supreme Commander. His mission is to stop the force from invading their planet and to rescue Apple and Champ.

== Gameplay ==
There are eight side scrolling levels in the game. The previous adventure format has been changed to a level-based format. The player can no longer explore the base in any direction. Instead, stages such as riding a motorcycle called "Tri-Formation" have been added to increase variety. Just like the previous game, JJ carries a gun, which was used as a design model for the Master System's Light Phaser. With the right equipment, the three-wheeled motorcycle becomes the Armorater flying suit of armor.
