= Shōsuke Nakawa =

Japanese playwright and theater director (1931–2014)

Shōsuke Nakawa (奈河彰輔, Nakawa Shōsuke; October 6, 1931 – October 13, 2014) was a Japanese playwright and theater director. Under the name Yoshizō Nakagawa (中川芳三, Nakagawa Yoshizō), he serves as an advisor to the Shōchiku Corporation which produces kabuki, and is heavily involved in reviving Kamigata kabuki traditions. He is also head of the Kamigata Kabuki-juku (school) and actively works with actor Ichikawa Ennosuke III on reviving old kabuki plays Nakawa has been described as a walking dictionary of Kamigata kabuki information.

== Early life ==
Nakawa was originally from Osaka, and graduated from Osaka University.

== Awards ==
He was granted a number of awards, including the Ōtani Takejirō Award, Matsuo Performing Arts Award, Osaka Citizens' Public Recognition Cultural Services Award, and Osaka Performing Arts Award.

== Plays ==
Original plays he wrote included Okuri hangan kurumagaidō (小栗判官車街道, "Inspector Okuri's Interstate"), Haji-momiji ase no kaomise (慙紅葉汗顔見勢, "Kaomise of Ashamed Autumn Leaves"), and Hitoritabi Gojūsantsugi (獨道中五十三駅, "One man journey, 53 Stations").

== Death ==
Nakawa died on October 13, 2014, at the age of 83.
