= Alex Kidd in Miracle World =

1986 video game

- Developer: Sega
- Publisher: Sega
- Designer: Kotaro Hayashida
- Programmer: Papa Kouichi
- Artist: Rieko Kodama
- Composer: Tokuhiko Uwabo
- Series: Alex Kidd
- Platforms: Master System; Nintendo Switch
- Release: Master System: JP: November 1, 1986; NA: December 1986; EU: 1987; Nintendo Switch: JP: February 21, 2019; WW: March 28, 2019
- Genre: Platform
- Mode: Single-player

Alex Kidd in Miracle World (Note: Japanese: アレックスキッドのミラクルワールド, Hepburn: Arekkusu Kiddo no Mirakuru Wārudo) is a platform game developed and published by Sega for the Master System. It was released in Japan on November 1, 1986, followed by North America in December 1986, and Europe in 1987. It was later built into many Master System and Master System II consoles. A remake developed by Jankenteam and published by Merge Games, titled Alex Kidd in Miracle World DX, was released on June 22, 2021.

== Gameplay ==
Alex Kidd shatters a block with a fist punch, revealing a bag of money.

Alex Kidd in Miracle World is a 2D platform game. The player must finish levels and overcome obstacles and puzzles in both scrolling and single-screen environments. Throughout the 17 stages, Alex faces many monsters and the three henchmen of Janken the Great, before facing Janken himself.

Alex's punching ability is used to destroy enemies and to break rocks in order to access new paths and to collect items such as money which can then be used to purchase other items including vehicles such as motorbikes and helicopters. At the end of many stages, Alex plays jan-ken-pon (rock-paper-scissors) with one of Janken's henchmen. Alex dies with one hit, or by losing a game of rock, paper, scissors.

The game has no save system, but by holding the directional pad up and pressing the 2 button eight times at the Game Over screen, the player will restart the level with three new lives, at a cost of 400 Baums (the in-game currency).

== Story ==
A young martial artist named Alex Kidd learns of a villain named Janken the Great who has defeated King Thunder of the city of Radaxian and who has kidnapped his son, Prince Egle (or "Igul"), and Egle's fiancée Princess Lora. Discovering that he is the lost son of King Thunder, Alex sets out to rescue the kingdom. On his quest, he defeats Janken's henchmen and retrieves various items which lead him toward Janken whom he defeats and sees turned to stone. Alex retrieves the crown, and the people of Radaxian are restored under the newly crowned King Egle.

== Development and release ==
Alex Kidd in Miracle World originally began development in 1984 as a licensed tie-in game based on the Dragon Ball manga series. However, during development, the Dragon Ball license expired and Sega CEO Hayao Nakayama ordered the developers to start the game over from scratch.

The game was originally only available as a cartridge but was later built into many editions of both the Master System and the Master System II power base, enabling play without the use of a game cartridge. From 1990 onwards, a slightly different version was integrated into the US, Australian and European versions of the Master System II and also some Australian and European versions of the original Master System. There were two differences: firstly when changing targets in the game map, Alex is shown eating onigiri in the original version (and the 2008 Wii Virtual Console port), and a hamburger in the integrated version. Secondly, the original version used button 2 to hit and button 1 to jump; these controls were inverted in the integrated version.

The game was released on the Wii via the Virtual Console in 2008. It was also released alongside Super Hang-On and The Revenge of Shinobi as part of Sega Vintage Collection: Alex Kidd and Co., which was released for Xbox Live Arcade and PlayStation Network in May 2012. This version allows play of any region version of the game (the European version retaining a 50 Hz framerate) and the Master System II variation. The original version is included on the AtGames Sega Genesis Flashback HD compilation, a dedicated console with games from the Sega Genesis, Master System, and Game Gear. In 2019, a port developed by M2 was released through the Sega Ages label for the Nintendo Switch.

== Reception ==
Reception

Aggregate score
Aggregator	Score
GameRankings	80%

Review scores
Publication	Score
AllGame	4/5
Computer and Video Games	87%
Eurogamer	7/10
GameTrailers	10/10
Génération 4	99%
IGN	9/10
The Games Machine (UK)	82%
Console XS	90%
Game Freaks 365	9.5/10
GameHall	9.3/10
RetroGarden	4/5
Sega Pro	95%
S: The Sega Magazine	93%

The game has been critically acclaimed since its release. In 1987, the French magazine Génération 4 gave the game a highly positive score. In Germany, Power Play named Alex Kidd in Miracle World the best Sega game of 1987 as part of its annual "Power Hits of the Year" awards. In 1991, Sega Pro magazine stated that, with "so much to do and so many different ways of doing it, this is one of those games you will keep coming back to even when you have finished it completely." Computer and Video Games magazine in 1991 described the game as "Sega's answer to Mario" and concluded that the "absorbing gameplay will have you glued to your screen for hours on end."

In a 2008 retro review, IGN gave Alex Kidd a score of 9 out of 10 and an "Editor's Choice" award, calling it "an exceptional platformer with loads of action and some great puzzle-solving challenges" that "still holds up remarkably well." IGN also gave the Wii Virtual Console release a score of 9 out of 10.

== Remake ==
A remake of the game, titled Alex Kidd in Miracle World DX, was announced on June 10, 2020, and released on June 22, 2021. The game is developed by Merge Games and Jankenteam for Nintendo Switch, PlayStation 4, PlayStation 5, Windows, Xbox One, and Xbox Series X/S. The remake features new levels, new NPCs, alternate boss fights, and can instantly change between modern or retro-style graphics by using the right trigger button. Once the player completes the game, the player unlocks two additional modes: Classic Mode, which is an upscaled Master System port of the original game, and Boss Rush, where the player must defeat all the bosses at Rock Paper Scissors and follow-up battle without dying.
