= Master System =

Home video game console

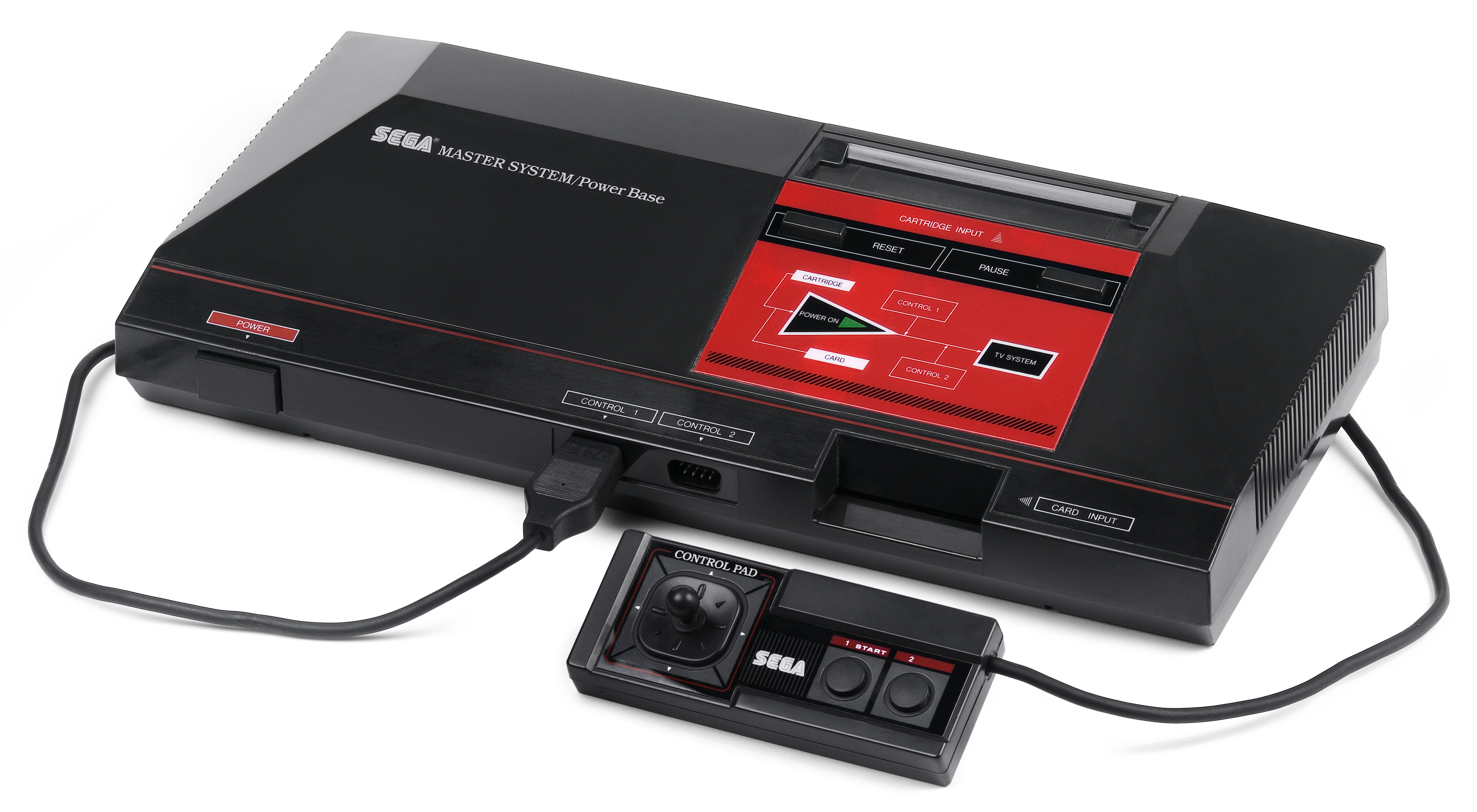
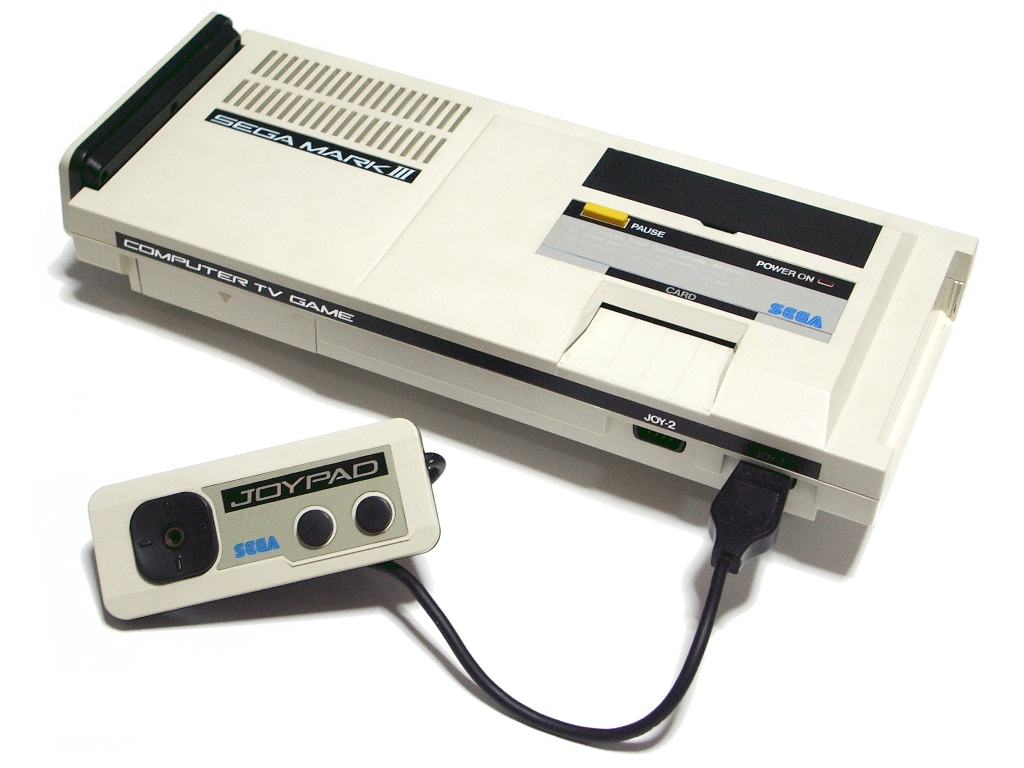
- Top: North American/European Master System; Bottom: Japanese Sega Mark III
- Also known as: KO: Samsung Gam*Boy
- Developer: Sega
- Manufacturer: Sega
- Type: Home video game console
- Generation: Third
- Released: October 20, 1985: Mark III; JP: October 20, 1985 Samsung Gam*Boy; KO: November 1988 Master System; NA: September 1986; EU: August 1987; JP: October 18, 1987; KO: April 1989; BR: September 1989
- Lifespan: JP: 1985–1991; NA: 1986–1992; EU: 1987–1996; KO: 1988–1994; BR: 1989–present
- Introductory price: ¥16,800 (equivalent to ¥21,700 in 2024); US$200 (equivalent to $590 in 2025) £99.95 (equivalent to £290 in 2025)
- Discontinued: JP: 1991; NA: 1992; KO: 1994; EU: 1996
- Units sold: Sega: 13 million (Note: Master System sales by region: Japan: 1 million (as of 1986); United States: 2 million (as of 1993); Western Europe: 6.8 million (as of 1993); South Korea: 720,000 (as of 1993); Australia: 650,000 (as of 1994); Brazil: 8 million (Tectoy variants)); Tectoy: 8 million
- Media: ROM cartridge, Sega Card
- CPU: Zilog Z80A @ 3.58 MHz
- Memory: 8 KB RAM; 16 KB VRAM
- Display: 256 × 192 resolution, 32 colors on-screen
- Sound: Texas Instruments SN76489 PSG via VDP; Yamaha YM2413 (Note: Japanese models only.)
- Backward compatibility: SG-1000
- Predecessor: SG-1000
- Successor: Sega Genesis
- Related: Game Gear

The Master System (Note: Japanese: マスターシステム, Hepburn: Masutā Shisutemu) is an 8-bit home video game console manufactured and developed by Sega. It was originally a remodeled export version of the Sega Mark III, the third iteration of the SG-1000 series of consoles, released in Japan on October 20, 1985. The Master System was launched in North America in September 1986, followed by Europe in August 1987, South Korea in April 1989, and Brazil in September 1989. A Japanese version was launched on October 23, 1987, with additions including a built-in FM audio chip, a rapid-fire switch, and a dedicated port for the 3D glasses. The Master System II, a cheaper model, was released in 1990 in North America, Australasia, and Europe.

The original Master System models use both cartridges and a credit card-sized format, Sega Cards. Accessories include a light gun and 3D glasses that work with specially designed games. The later Master System II redesign removed the card slot, turning it into a strictly cartridge-only system, and is incompatible with the 3D glasses.

As a third-generation console, the Master System was released in competition with the Nintendo Entertainment System (NES). Its library is smaller and with fewer well-reviewed games than the NES, due in part to Nintendo licensing policies requiring platform exclusivity. Though the Master System had newer, improved hardware, it failed to overturn Nintendo's market share advantage in Japan, North America, and most of Western Europe. However, it attained greater success in some markets, including the United Kingdom, Belgium, Spain, Brazil, South Korea, New Zealand, and Australia.

The Master System is estimated to have sold 13 million units worldwide. In addition, Tectoy has sold 8 million licensed Master System variants in Brazil. Retrospective criticism has recognized its role in the development of the Sega Genesis, and a number of well-received games, particularly in PAL (including PAL-M) regions, but is critical of its limited library in the NTSC regions, which were dominated by the NES.

== History ==
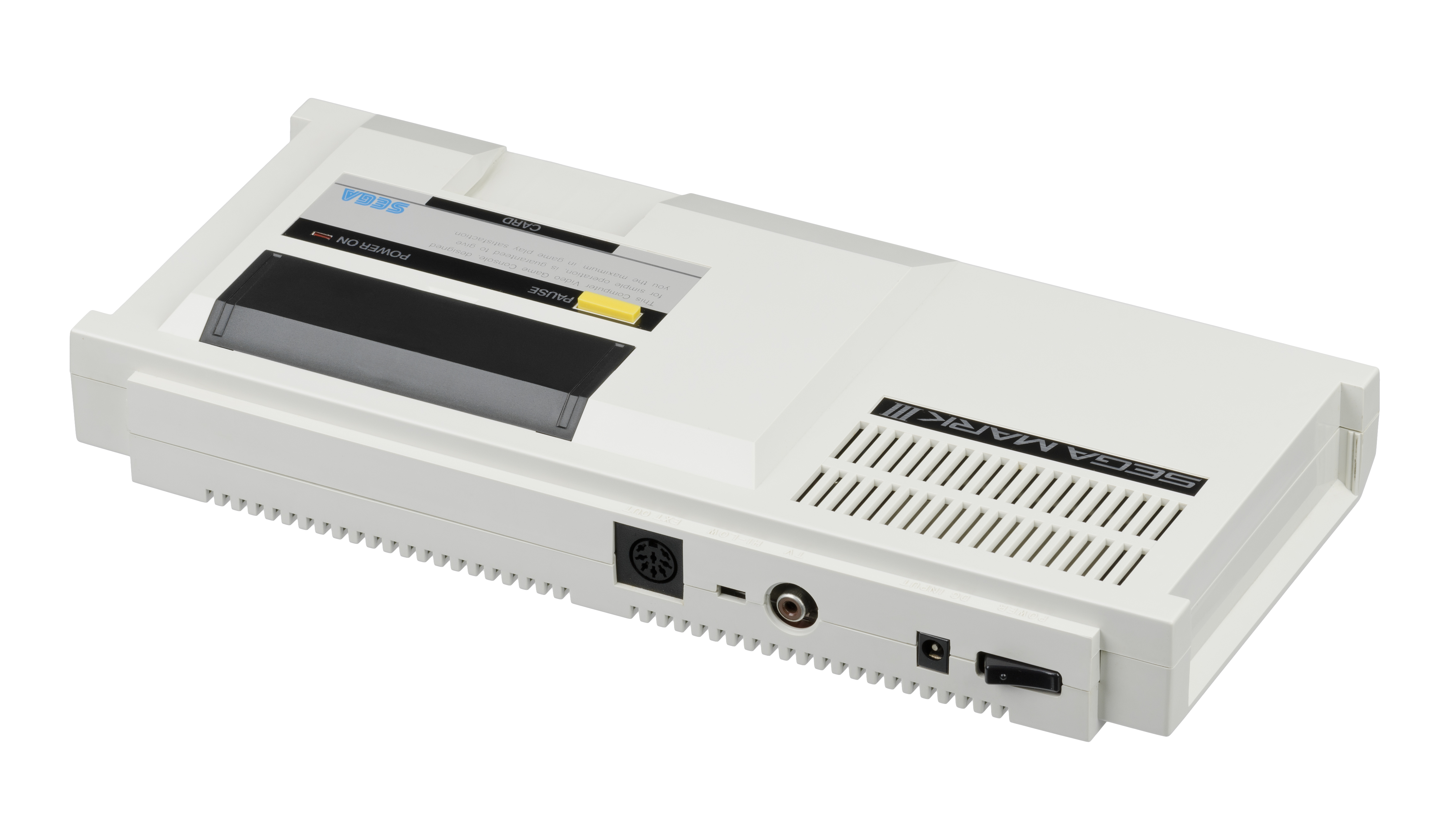
Mark III rear view

=== Mark III ===
Sega released its first video game console, the SG-1000, in Japan on July 15, 1983, the same day its competitor Nintendo launched the Family Computer (Famicom). In 1984, parent company Gulf and Western Industries divested its non-core businesses including Sega, and Sega president Hayao Nakayama was installed as CEO. Nakayama and Sega co-founder David Rosen later arranged a management buyout with financial backing from CSK Corporation, and installed CSK CEO Isao Okawa as chairman.

On July 31, 1984, Sega released the SG-1000 II, a revised version of the SG-1000 with several hardware alterations, including detachable controllers. Hoping to better compete with Nintendo, Sega released the Mark III, another revision of the SG-1000, in Japan on October 20, 1985 at ¥15,000. The Mark III was engineered by the same team as the SG-1000, including Hideki Sato and Masami Ishikawa, who had worked on the SG-1000 II and later led development of the Mega Drive. According to Sato, the console was redesigned because of the limitations of the Texas Instruments TMS9918A graphics chip in the SG-1000, which did not have the power for the kinds of games Sega wanted to make. The Mark III's chip was designed in-house, based around the unit in Sega's System 2 arcade system board.

Though its hardware was more powerful than the Famicom, the Mark III was not successful on launch. Problems arose from Nintendo's licensing practices with third-party developers, whereby Nintendo required that games for the Famicom not be published on other consoles. Sega developed its own games and obtained the rights to port games from other developers, but they did not sell well.

=== North American release as Master System ===
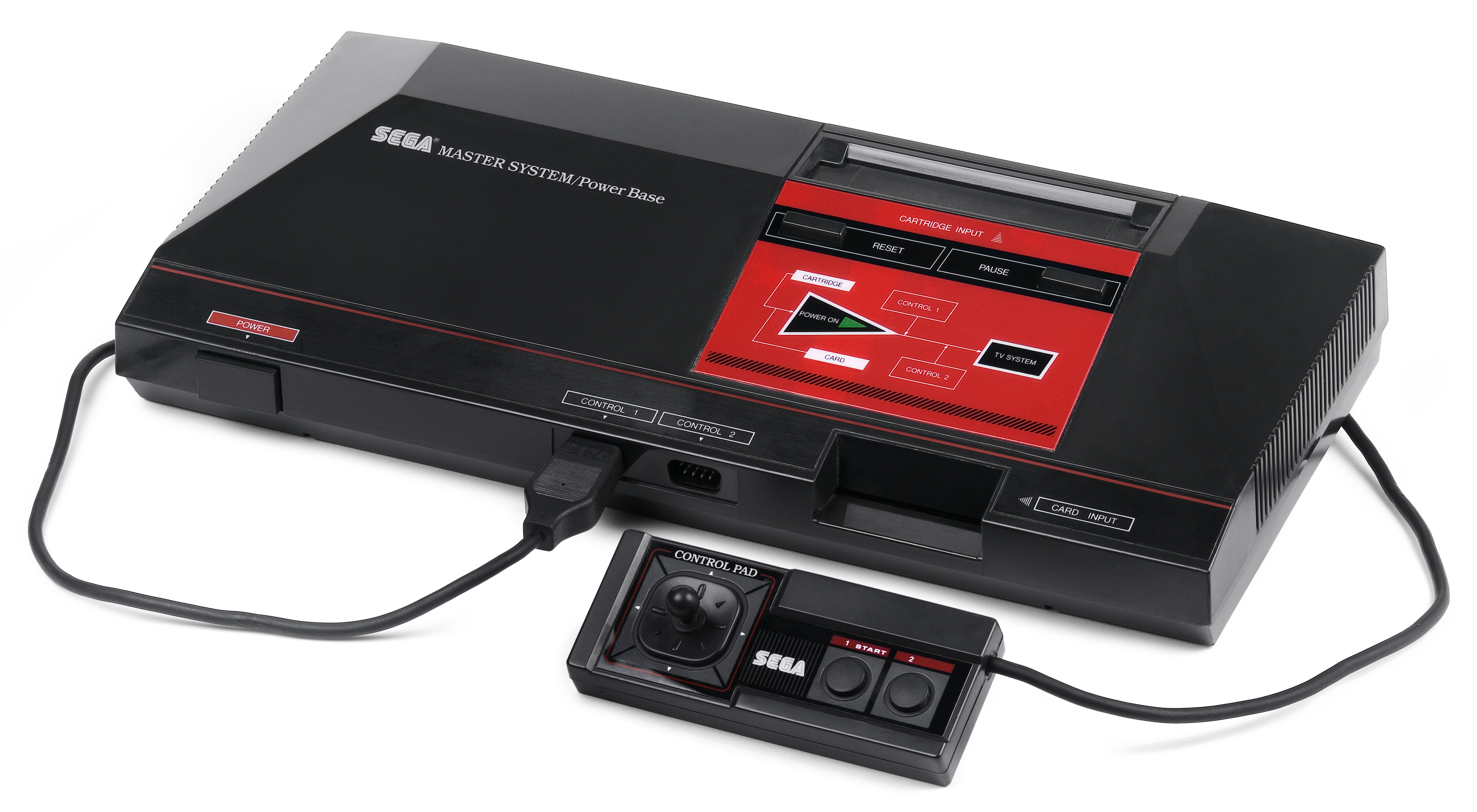
The Master System

Though the SG-1000 had not been released in the United States, Sega hoped that their console business would fare better in North America than it had in Japan. To accomplish this, Sega of America was established in 1986 to manage the company's consumer products in North America. Rosen and Nakayama hired Bruce Lowry, Nintendo of America's vice president of sales. Lowry was persuaded to change companies because Sega would allow him to start his new office in San Francisco. He chose the name "Sega of America" for his division because he had worked for Nintendo of America and liked the combination of words. Initially, Sega of America was tasked with repackaging the Mark III for a Western release. Sega of America rebranded the Mark III as the Master System, similar to Nintendo's reworking of the Famicom into the Nintendo Entertainment System (NES). The name was chosen by Sega of America employees throwing darts against a whiteboard of suggested names. Plans to release a cheaper console, the Base System, also influenced the decision. Okawa approved of the name after being told it was a reference to the competitive nature of both the video game industry and martial arts, in which only one competitor can be the "Master". The console's futuristic final design was intended to appeal to Western tastes. The North American packaging was white to differentiate it from the black NES packaging, with a white grid design inspired by Apple computer products.

The Master System was first revealed in North America at the Summer Consumer Electronics Show (CES) in Chicago in June 1986. It was later launched in September 1986 at a price of $200 (equivalent to $590 in 2025), initially sold in a package with the "Power Base" console, a light gun, two controllers, and a pack-in multicart with the games Hang-On and Safari Hunt. Around the same time, Nintendo was exporting the Famicom to the US as the Nintendo Entertainment System, and both Sega and Nintendo planned to spend $15 million in late 1986 to market their respective consoles; Sega hoped to sell 400,000 to 750,000 consoles in 1986. By the end of 1986, at least 125,000 Master System consoles had been sold, more than the Atari 7800's 100,000 but less than Nintendo's 1.1 million. Other sources indicate that more than 250,000 Master System consoles were sold by Christmas 1986.

As in Japan, the Master System in North America had a limited game library. Limited by Nintendo's licensing practices, Sega only had two third-party American publishers, Activision and Parker Brothers. Agreements with both of those companies came to an end in 1989. Sega claimed that the Master System was the first console "where the graphics on the box are actually matched by the graphics of the game", and pushed the "arcade experience" in adverts. However, its marketing department was run by only two people, giving Sega a disadvantage in advertising. As one method of promoting the console, at the end of 1987 Sega partnered with astronaut Scott Carpenter to start the "Sega Challenge", a traveling program set up in recreational centers where kids were tested on non-verbal skills such as concentration and the ability to learn new skills. Out Run and Shooting Gallery were two games included in the challenge.

In 1987, amid struggling sales in the US, Sega sold the US distribution rights for the Master System to toy company Tonka, which had no experience with electronic entertainment systems. Sega had made the deal in order to leverage Tonka's knowledge of the American toy market, since Nintendo had marketed the NES as a toy to great success in North America. The announcement was made shortly after the 1987 Summer CES. During this time, much of Sega of America's infrastructure shifted from marketing and distribution to focus on customer service, and Lowry departed the company. Tonka blocked localization of several popular Japanese games, and during 1988 were less willing to purchase mask ROMs needed for game cartridge manufacture during a shortage. They also became less willing to invest in video games after taking massive loans in purchasing Kenner Toys in 1987, followed by poor holiday season sales and financial losses.

On October 18, 1987, the Mark III was re-released as the Master System in Japan for ¥16,800, but still sold poorly. Neither model posed a serious challenge to Nintendo in Japan, and, according to Sato, Sega was only able to attain 10% of the Japanese console market.

=== Europe, Brazil, and other markets ===
The Master System was launched in Europe in August 1987, distributed by Mastertronic in the United Kingdom, Master Games in France, and Ariolasoft in West Germany, the latter of whom had initially purchased UK distribution rights. As Ariolasoft could not agree to a pricing agreement with Sega, Mastertronic signed a deal in 1987 to take control of UK distribution, and announced the deal at the 1987 Summer CES. The company announced the release of 12 titles by autumn. Mastertronic advertised the Master System as "an arcade in the home" and launched it at £99 (equivalent to £290 in 2025). Advance orders from retailers were high, but Sega proved unable to deliver inventory until Boxing Day on December 26, causing many retailers to cancel their orders. Mastertronic and Master Games entered financial crises and Ariolasoft vowed never to work with Sega again. Mastertronic had already sold a minority interest to the Virgin Group to enter the console business, and sold the remainder to avoid bankruptcy. The newly rebranded Virgin Mastertronic took over all European distribution in 1988.

Virgin Mastertronic focused marketing the Master System on ports of Sega's arcade games and positioning it as a superior video game alternative to the Commodore 64 and the ZX Spectrum computers. As a result of this marketing, coupled with Nintendo's less effective early approaches in Europe, the Master System began to attract European developers. The Master System held a significant part of the video game console market in Europe until the release of Sega's succeeding console, the Mega Drive. (Note: Sega Genesis and Mega Drive are the same console. It was known as Genesis in North America and Mega Drive worldwide.) In 1989, Virgin Mastertronic began offering rentals of the Master System console and 20 games. The United Kingdom also hosted a Sega video games national championship, with the winner competing against Japanese and American champions on the British television show Motormouth. Players competed in a variety of games, including Astro Warrior, platform games, and sports games. During the late 1980s, the Master System was outselling the NES in the United Kingdom.

The Master System was successful in Europe, becoming the best-selling console in the region by 1990; by that time, however, the NES was beginning to have a fast-growing user base in the UK. In 1990 alone, Virgin Mastertronic sold 150,000 Master Systems in the United Kingdom, greater than the 60,000 Mega Drives and Nintendo's 80,000 consoles sold in the same period. In the whole of Europe that year, Sega sold a combined 918,000 consoles, greater than Nintendo's 655,000.

The Master System was also successful in Brazil, where it was launched in September 1989 and was distributed by Tectoy, a Brazilian toy company startup focused on electronic toys. Tectoy had reached out to Sega about distributing their products and, despite Sega's hesitation given their situation with Tonka in the US, was eventually given liberty to manage Sega products in Brazil. Their success distributing Sega's laser tag gun based on the anime Zillion gave Sega the confidence to allow Tectoy to distribute the Master System. By the end of 1990, the installed base in Brazil was about 280,000 units. Tectoy introduced a telephone service with game tips, created a Master System club, and presented the program Master Tips during commercial breaks of the television show Sessão Aventura on Rede Globo. Nintendo did not arrive in Brazil until 1993, and were unable to officially compete, as clones of the NES dominated the Brazilian market. Tectoy claimed 80% of the Brazilian video game market.

In South Korea, the Sega Mark III was released by Samsung under the name "Gam*Boy" in April 1989, followed by the Master System II, under the name "Aladdin Boy", in 1992. By 1993, it had sold 720,000 units in South Korea, outselling the NES (released in the region by Hyundai Group as the "Comboy") and becoming the best-selling console in the region until 1993. The Master System was also popular in New Zealand and Australia; in the latter country, it was more successful than the NES, with 250,000 units sold there during 1990 alone. By November 1994, 650,000 units had been sold in Australia.

=== Decline ===
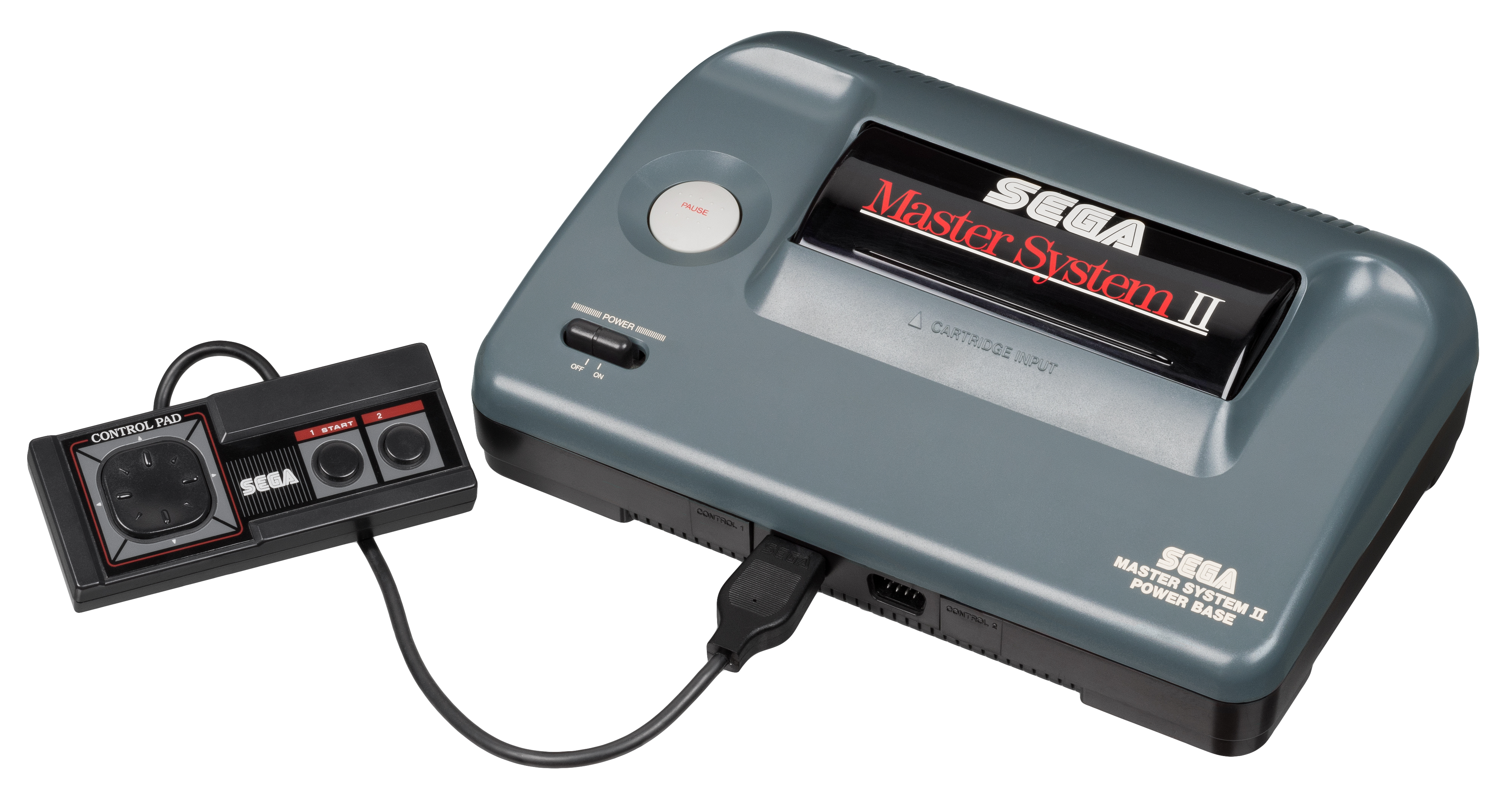
Master System II, a cost-reduced version released in 1990 by Sega

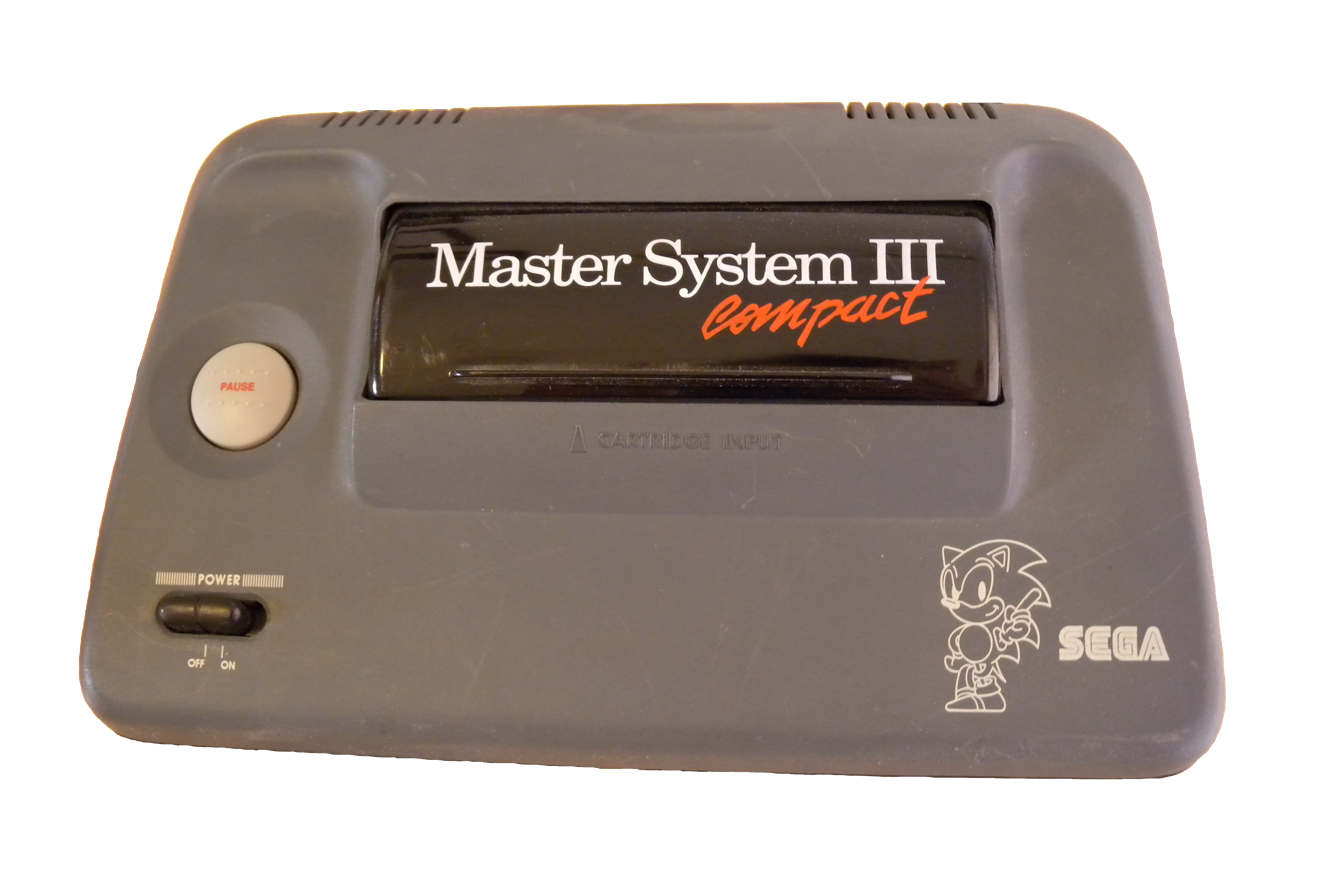
Master System III Compact manufactured by Tectoy

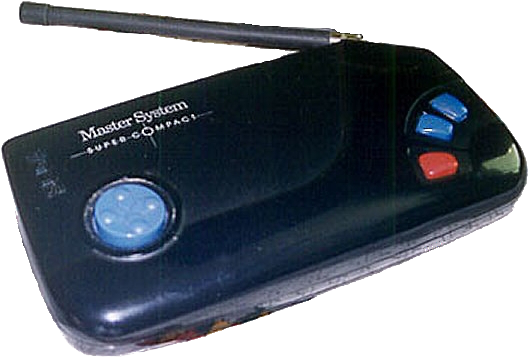
Master System Super Compact by Tectoy

Although the Master System was a success in Europe, Australia, and later in Brazil, it failed to ignite significant interest in the Japanese or North American markets, which, by the mid-to-late 1980s, were both dominated by Nintendo, who held 83 percent of the North American video game market by 1988. With Sega continuing to have difficulty penetrating the home market, Sega's console R&D team, led by Ishikawa and supervised by Sato, began work on a successor to the Master System almost immediately after the system's launch. Another competitor in Japan arose in 1987, when Japanese computer giant NEC released the PC Engine (later released in North America as the TurboGrafx-16) amid great publicity.

Sega released its next console, the 16-bit Mega Drive, in Japan on October 29, 1988. The final licensed release for the Master System in Japan was Bomber Raid in 1989. That same year, Sega was preparing to release the new Mega Drive as the Sega Genesis in North America. Displeased with Tonka's handling of the Master System, Sega reacquired the marketing and distribution rights to the Master System for the United States. In 1990, Sega released the remodeled Master System II, designed as a lower-cost version without the Sega Card slot. Sega promoted the new model, but it sold poorly. By early 1992, production of the Master System had ceased in North America, having sold between 1.5 million and 2 million units, behind both Nintendo and Atari, which controlled 80 percent and 12 percent of the market respectively. The last licensed Master System release in North America was Sonic the Hedgehog (1991).

In Europe, where the Master System was the best-selling console up until 1990, the NES caught up with and narrowly overtook the Master System in Western Europe during the early 1990s; however, the Master System maintained its lead in several markets such as the UK, Belgium, and Spain. In 1993, the Master System's estimated active installed user base in Europe was 6.25 million units, larger than that of the Mega Drive's 5.73 million that year but less than the NES's 7.26 million. Combined with the Mega Drive, Sega represented the majority of the European console market that year. The Master System II was also successful and helped Sega to sustain their significant market share. Releases in Europe continued into the 1990s, including Mercs, Sonic the Hedgehog 2 (both 1992), and Streets of Rage 2 (1994).

The Master System has had continued success in Brazil, where dedicated "plug and play" consoles emulating the original hardware continue to be sold by Tectoy, including portable versions. These systems include the Master System Compact and the Master System III, and Tectoy has also received requests to remake the original Master System. In 2012, UOL reported that Tectoy re-releases of the Master System and Mega Drive combined sold around 150,000 units per year in Brazil. By 2016, Tectoy said they had sold 8 million units of Master System branded systems in Brazil.

== Technical specifications ==
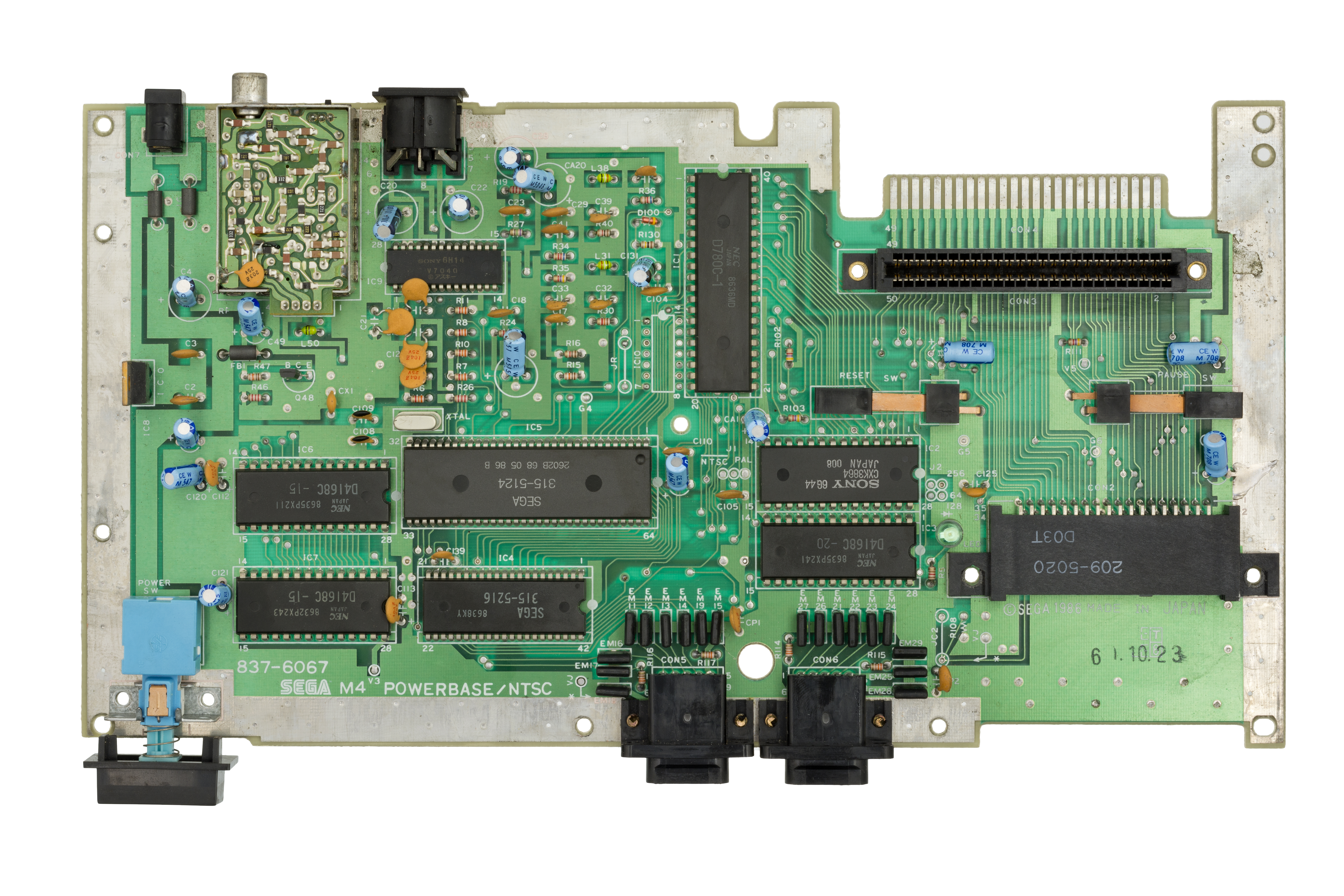
Master System motherboard

The Master System's main CPU is an 8-bit Zilog Z80A rated for 4 MHz, but runs at 3.58 MHz. It has 8 KB of ROM, 8 KB of RAM and 16 KB of video RAM (VRAM). Video is provided through an RF switch (though Model 1s with an AV port can also output composite and even RGB video) and displays at a resolution of 256 × 192 pixels and up to 32 colors at one time from a total palette of 64 colors; the Video Display Processor (VDP) graphics chip was designed by Sega for the Mark III. The Master System measures 365 mm × 170 mm × 70 mm (14.4 in × 6.7 in × 2.8 in), while the Mark III measures 318 mm × 145 mm × 52 mm (12.5 in × 5.7 in × 2.0 in). Both consoles use two slots for game input: one for Mega Cartridges and one for Sega Cards, along with an expansion slot and two controller ports. Sound is provided by the Texas Instruments SN76489 PSG built into the VDP, which can provide three square wave channels and one noise channel. The Japanese version also integrates the Yamaha YM2413 FM chip, an optional feature on the Mark III. With few exceptions, Master System hardware is identical to the hardware in the Mark III. Games for the console are playable on the Sega Genesis using the Power Base Converter accessory, and on the Game Gear using the Master Gear Converter. Compared to the base NES, the Master System has four times as much system memory, eight times as much video memory, and a higher CPU clock rate.

Sega produced several iterations of the Master System. The Master System II, released in 1990, removed a number of components to reduce cost: the Sega Card slot, reset button, power light, expansion port, and startup music and logo. In most regions, the Master System II's A/V port was omitted, leaving only RF output available; this was reversed in France, where the local version of the Master System II had only A/V video output available and omitted the RF hardware. In Brazil, Tectoy released several licensed variations; the Master System Super Compact functions wirelessly with an RF transmitter, and the Master System Girl, a pink version of its wireless Master System Super Compact aimed at female consumers. The console initially included Mônica no Castelo do Dragão as a built-in game, while a later version incorporated Turma da Mônica em: O Resgate and Sonic the Hedgehog. Tectoy executive Stefano Arnhold later explained that the model was developed in response to market research indicating that girls were less likely than boys to own video game consoles.. The Master System 3 Collection, released in 2006, contains 120 built-in games. Handheld versions of the Master System were released under several brands, such as Coleco in 2006.

=== Accessories ===
Two Master system controllers	A Master System Light Phaser	A pair of Sega 3D glasses
Master System controllers	Light Phaser	SegaScope 3-D glasses

A number of cross-compatible accessories were created for the Mark III and Master System. The controller consists of a rectangle with a D-pad and two buttons. Sega also introduced additional Mark III controllers, such as a paddle controller. A combination steering wheel and flight stick, the Handle Controller, was released in 1989. The Sega Control Stick is an arcade-style joystick with the buttons on the opposite side as the standard controller. Unreleased in Europe, the Sega Sports Pad utilizes a trackball and is compatible with three games. Sega also created an expansion for its controller, the Rapid Fire Unit, that allows for auto-fire by holding down one of two buttons. This unit connects between the console and the controller. A light gun peripheral, the Light Phaser, was based on the weapon of the same name from the Japanese anime Zillion. It is compatible with 13 games and released exclusively in the West.

A pair of 3D glasses, the SegaScope 3-D, were created for games such as Space Harrier 3-D, although Mark III users need an additional converter to use them. The SegaScope 3-D works via an active shutter 3D system, creating a stereoscopic effect. The glasses need to be connected to the Sega Card slot, and thus do not function with the Master System II due to lack of the card slot. A total of eight games, including Zaxxon 3-D and OutRun 3-D, are compatible with the glasses.

The Mark III has an optional RF transmitter accessory, allowing wireless play that broadcasts the game being played on a UHF television signal.

=== Game Gear ===
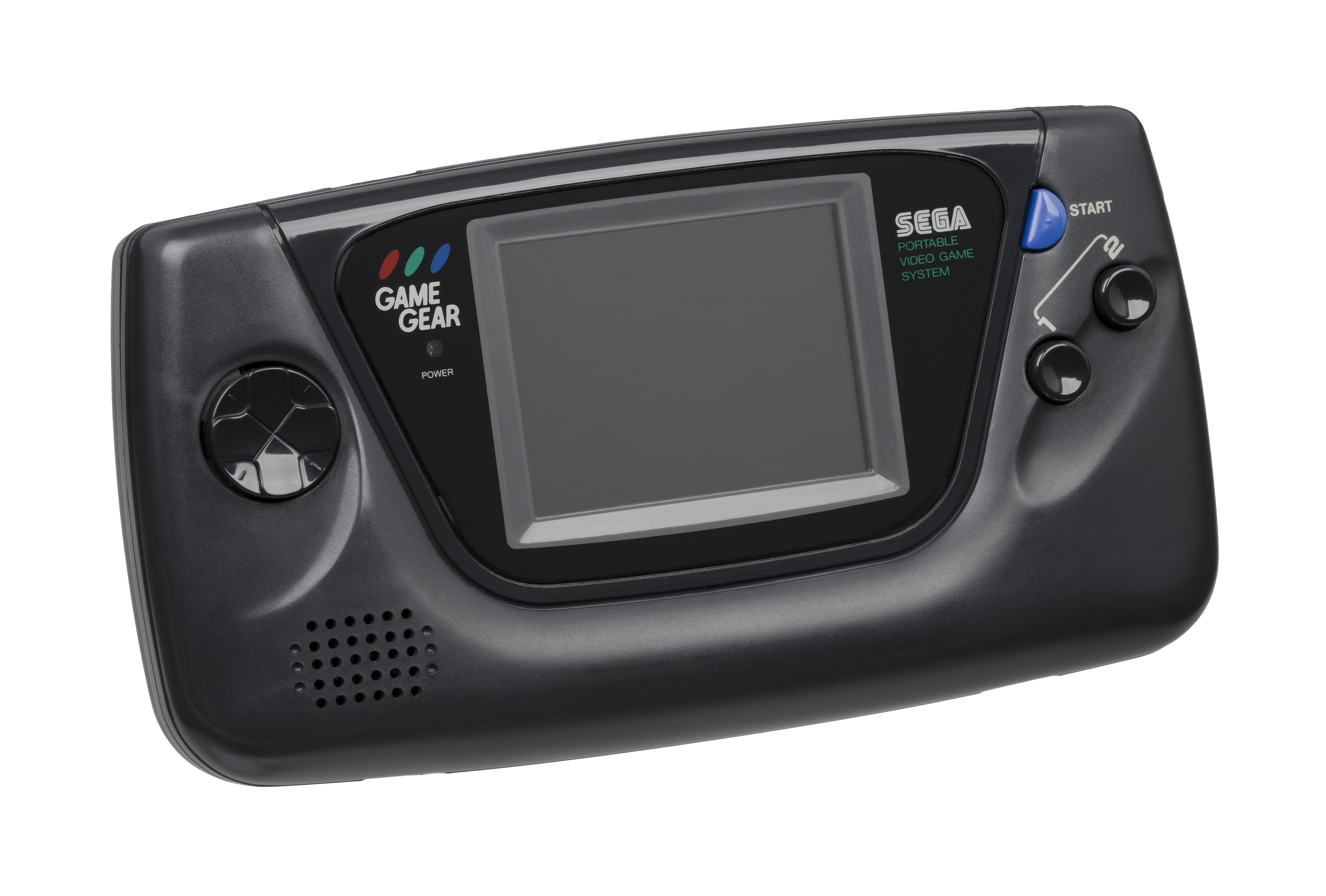
The Game Gear was based on the Master System's architecture.

Developed under the name "Project Mercury" and designed based on the Master System's hardware, the Game Gear is a handheld game console. It was first released in Japan on October 6, 1990, in North America and Europe in 1991, and in Australia and New Zealand in 1992. Originally retailing at JP¥19,800 in Japan, $149.99 in North America, and £99.99 in the United Kingdom, the Game Gear was designed to compete with the Game Boy, which Nintendo had released in 1989. There are similarities between the Game Gear and the Master System hardware; Master System games are playable on Game Gear using the Master Gear Converter accessory. A large part of the Game Gear's game library consists of Master System ports. Because of hardware similarities, including the landscape screen orientation, Master System games are easily portable to the handheld. In particular, many Master System ports of Game Gear games were done by Tectoy for the Brazilian market, as the Master System was more popular than the Game Gear in the region.

== Game library ==
Phantasy Star for the Master System became one of Sega's successful franchises.

Master System games came in two formats: ROM cartridges held up to 4 Mbit (512 KB) of code and data, while Sega Cards held up to 256 Kbit (32 KB). Cartridges were marketed by their storage size: One Mega (1 Mbit), Two Mega (2 Mbit), and Four Mega (4 Mbit). Cards, cheaper to manufacture than the cartridges, included Spy vs. Spy and Super Tennis, but were eventually dropped due to their small memory size. The size of the release library varies based on region; North America received just over 100 games, with Japan receiving less. Europe, by contrast, received over 300 licensed games, including 8-bit ports of Genesis games and PAL-exclusive releases. The first Mark III-specific cartridge was Fantasy Zone, released on June 15, 1986, and Bomber Raid was the final release on February 4, 1989, a few months after the launch of the Mega Drive. The final North American release was Sonic the Hedgehog in October 1991. Games for PAL regions continued to be released until the mid-1990s.

The Sega Mark III and the Japanese Master System are backwards-compatible with SC-3000/SG-1000 cartridges, and can play Sega Card games without the Card Catcher peripheral. However, educational and programming cartridges for the SC-3000 require the SK-1100 keyboard peripheral, which is compatible with the Mark III. Mark III-specific games were initially available in card format (labelled My Card Mark III to distinguish themselves from games designed for the SC-3000/SG-1000), starting with Teddy Boy Blues and Hang-On, both released on October 20, 1985.

Of the games released for the Master System, Phantasy Star is considered a benchmark role-playing game (RPG), and became a successful franchise. Sega's flagship character at the time, Alex Kidd, was featured in games including Alex Kidd in Miracle World. Wonder Boy III: The Dragon's Trap was influential for its blend of platform gameplay with RPG elements. Different Master System consoles included built-in games, including Snail Maze, Hang-On/Safari Hunt, Alex Kidd in Miracle World, and Sonic the Hedgehog. Battery-backup save game support was included in eight cartridges, including Penguin Land, Phantasy Star, Ys, and Miracle Warriors.

The more extensive PAL region library includes 8-bit entries in Genesis franchises such as Streets of Rage, a number of additional Sonic the Hedgehog games, and dozens of PAL exclusives such as The Lucky Dime Caper Starring Donald Duck, Asterix, Ninja Gaiden, Master of Darkness, and Power Strike II. Retro Gamer's Damien McFerran praised the "superb" PAL library of "interesting ports and excellent exclusives", which was richer than the North American library and provided a "drip-feed of quality titles".

After the Master System was discontinued in other markets, additional games were released in Brazil by Tectoy, including ports of Street Fighter II: Champion Edition and Dynamite Headdy. Tectoy created Portuguese translations of games exclusive to the region. Some of these would tie in to popular Brazilian entertainment franchises; for example, Teddy Boy became Geraldinho, certain Wonder Boy titles became Monica's Gang games, and Ghost House became Chapolim vs. Dracula: Um Duelo Assutador, based on the Mexican TV series El Chapulín Colorado. Tectoy also ported games to the Master System, including various games from the Genesis and Game Gear. Aside from porting, the company developed Férias Frustradas do Pica-Pau after finding out that Woody Woodpecker (named Pica-Pau in Portuguese) was the most popular cartoon on Brazilian television, along with at least twenty additional exclusives. These titles were developed in-house by Tectoy in Brazil.

Due in part to Nintendo's licensing practices, which stipulated that third-party NES developers could not release games on other platforms, few third-party developers released games for the Master System. According to Sato, Sega was focused on porting its arcade games instead of building relationships with third parties. According to Sega designer Mark Cerny, most of Sega's early Master System games were developed within a strict three-month deadline, which affected their quality. Computer Gaming World compared new Sega games to "drops of water in the desert". Games for the Master System took advantage of more advanced hardware compared to the NES; Alex Kidd in Miracle World, for example, showcases "blistering colors and more detailed sprites" than NES games. The Master System version of R-Type was praised for its visuals, comparable to those of the TurboGrafx-16 port.

In 2005, Sega reached a deal with the company AtGames to release emulated Master System software in Taiwan, Hong Kong, and China. Several Master System games were released for download on Nintendo's Wii Virtual Console, beginning with Hokuto no Ken in 2008 in Japan and Wonder Boy in North America. Master System games were also released via the GameTap online service.

== Reception and legacy ==
Due to the continued release of new variants in Brazil, the Master System is considered by many video gaming publications to be the longest lived gaming console in video games history, a title it took from the Atari 2600. Sales of the Master System have been estimated sold 13 million units, not including later Brazil sales. It saw much more continued success in Europe and Brazil than it did in Japan and North America. In 1989, the Master System was listed in the top 20 products of NPD Group's Toy Retail Sales Tracking Service. However, the Electronic Gaming Monthly 1992 Buyer's Guide indicated a souring interest in the console. Four reviewers scored it 5, 4, 5, and 5 out of a possible 10 points each, focusing on the better value of the Genesis and lack of quality games for the Master System. In 1993, reviewers scored it 2, 2, 3, and 3 out of 10, noting its abandonment by Sega in North America and lack of new releases. By contrast, over 34 million NES units were sold in North America alone, outselling the Master System's life time units globally nearly three times over. According to Bill Pearse of Playthings, the NES gained an advantage through better software and more recognizable characters. Sega closed the gap with Nintendo in the next generation with the release of the Genesis, which sold 30.75 million consoles compared with the 49 million Super Nintendo Entertainment System consoles.

Retrospective feedback of the Master System praises its support toward development of the Sega Genesis, but has been critical of its small game library. Writing for AllGame, Dave Beuscher noted that the Master System "was doomed by the lack of third-party software support and all but disappeared from the American market by 1992." Retro Gamer writer Adam Buchanan praised the larger PAL library as a "superb library of interesting ports and excellent exclusives". Damien McFerran, also of Retro Gamer, recognized its importance to the success of the Genesis, stating, "Without this criminally undervalued machine, Sega would not have enjoyed the considerable success it had with the Mega Drive. The Master System allowed Sega to experiment with arcade conversions, original IP and even create a mascot in the form of the lovable monkey-boy Alex Kidd." In 2009, the Master System was named the 20th best console of all time by IGN, behind the Atari 7800 (17th) and the NES (1st). IGN cited the Master System's small and uneven NTSC library as the major problems: "Months could go by between major releases and that made a dud on the Master System feel even more painful."
