= Greg Chun =

American voice actor

- Occupations: Voice actor; musician
- Years active: 1995–present

Greg Chun is an American voice actor and musician who is known for his work in English-dubbed anime and video games.

== Personal life ==
Chun graduated from Stanford University and has found himself in a dilemma in following different types of jobs. Chun is of Korean descent.

He resides in Burbank, California, and splits his time between voice acting and music production.

== Music ==
Chun has produced music on many of The Lonely Island's projects, including Saturday Night Live, the 67th Primetime Emmy Awards and Michael Bolton's Big, Sexy Valentine's Day Special.

== Recognition ==
Based on his previous knowledge of the Yakuza video game series franchise, Chun was surprised and pleased to be selected to voice Takayuki Yagami in the English-language version of the 2018 spin-off Judgment. Yagami's voice was meant to make him sound like a "bona fide badass" regardless of language, something the localization team believed they succeeded at. Chun found his work on the game gratifying, saying that "it really did require me to let go of the tricks that you use to push a performance through, and I really did need to fall back on authenticity and genuine groundedness". Chun found staying faithful to the spirit of the Japanese version challenging but enjoyed portraying Yagami's blend of seriousness and comedy. He said having to scream in certain parts of the game was difficult. Chun was surprised by the depth of Yagami's character arc, considering his work on the game an unforgettable experience. He found the character easy to connect with because of his realistic characterization.

Greg Chun's performance as Yagami was praised by The Hollywood Reporter and Game Informer. EGM Now agreed, believing Chun made a more striking performance than Takuya Kimura, who the writer did not find suitable for the character. RPGamer praised both Kimura and Chun's performances as Yagami.

== Filmography ==
=== Anime ===
List of voice performances in anime
Year	Series	Role	Notes	Source
2015	Heroes: Legend of the Battle Disks			
2016–25	One-Punch Man	Garou, Mountain Ape, Train Conductor		
2017	Occultic;Nine	Kiryu Kusakabe		
2017	Blue Exorcist	Additional Voices		
2017–19	Mob Psycho 100	Matsuo		
2017	March Comes In like a Lion	Rei's Dad		
2018	Jojo's Bizarre Adventure	N'Doul	2 episodes, 2012 series	
2018–19	Bungo Stray Dogs	Ryuro Hirotsu, Natsume Soseki		
2018	Sword Gai: The Animation	Naoki Miki		
2018–19	Naruto: Shippuden	En Oyashiro, Zosui, Taiko Uchiha, others		
2018–19	Hunter x Hunter	Ikalgo, Rock Climber	2011 series	
2018	Fate/Extra Last Encore	Twice H. Pieceman		
2018	Saint Seiya: The Lost Canvas	Virgo Asmita		
2018–19	Twin Star Exorcists	Kuranashi		
2018	Last Hope	Jay Yun		
2018	A.I.C.O. -Incarnation-	Yoshihiko Sagami	Bang Zoom! dub	
2018	Sword Art Online Alternative Gun Gale Online	David		
2018–19	Beyblade Burst Turbo	Phi, Hyde		
2018–19	Hero Mask	James Blood	Netflix dub	
2018–20	Baki	Kaoru Hanayama, Son Kaioh, Lee Kaioh	Netflix dub	
2018	Sirius the Jaeger	Hideomi Iba		
2019	Gundam Build Divers	Hellfire Ogre		
2019	Record of Grancrest War	Villar Constance		
2019–21	Megalobox	Tatsumi Leonard Aragaki		
2019	Neon Genesis Evangelion	Ryoji Kaiji	Netflix dub	
2019–24	Demon Slayer: Kimetsu no Yaiba	Muzan Kibutsuji		
2019	Teasing Master Takagi-san	Additional Voices	4 episodes	
2019	The Disastrous Life of Saiki K.	Additional Voices	5 episodes	
2020–21	Sword Art Online	Subtilizer, Additional Voices		
2020	Japan Sinks: 2020	Prime Minister Zaizen		
2020	Dragon's Dogma	Ethan		
2021	Vivy: Fluorite Eye's Song	Youichi Aikawa		
2021–23	Vinland Saga	Thors	Netflix dub	
2021	Super Crooks	Rubberball, Paragon		
2022	Blade Runner: Black Lotus	Alan Chen		
2022	Shaman King	Matamune	2021 series	
2022	Ghost in the Shell: SAC_2045	Noda	Episode: "ROOM 101/Man's Search for Meaning"	
2022	Spriggan	Director Yamamoto		
2022–24	Boruto: Naruto Next Generations	Amado Sanzu		
2023	Nier: Automata Ver1.1a	Adam		
2023	Baki Hanma	Kaoru Hanayama, Mogi		
2024	Go! Go! Loser Ranger!	Hibiki's Father		
2026	Banana Fish	Shunichi Ibe		

=== Film ===
List of performances in films
Year	Series	Role	Notes	Source
2001	Trailer: The Movie!	Narrator	Short film	
2013	Thor: The Dark World		Uncredited	
2017	The Nut Job 2: Nutty by Nature	Mouse Henchman #1		
2017	Asura: The City of Madness		English dub	
2018	Big Fish & Begonia	Chun's Dad, Hotu, Chisonzi	English dub	
2019	Yucatán	Clayderman	English dub	
2019	Neon Genesis Evangelion: Death & Rebirth	Ryoji Kaji	English dub	
2019	Neon Genesis Evangelion: End of Evangelion	Ryoji Kaji	English dub	
2019	Millennium Actress	Man with Key	English dub	
2020	NiNoKuni	Black Hooded Man	English dub	
2020	Superman: Red Son	Ambassador Lee		
2022	Chip 'n Dale: Rescue Rangers	Deodorant Commercial Narrator		
2022	Inu-Oh	Additional Voices	English dub	
2022	Beavis and Butt-Head Do the Universe	Bus Driver		
2023	Godzilla Minus One	Sōsaku Tachibana	English dub	
2024	Ghost Cat Anzu	Blue Oni, Station Attendant	English dub	

=== Television ===
List of performances in television
Year	Series	Role	Notes	Source
2016	Days of Our Lives			
2019–20	Kingdom	Chang, Additional Voices	12 episodes, English dub	
2019–21	I Think You Should Leave with Tim Robinson		Original Music, Composer	
2021–25	Squid Game	Seong Gi-hun	22 episodes, English dub	

=== Animation ===
List of voice performances in animation
Year	Series	Role	Notes	Source
2015	American Dad!		Episode: "American Fung", Live-action role	
2016	Overwatch Animated Shorts	Dr. Harold Winston	Episode: "Recall", Short	
2017	The Nine Lives of Claw	Additional Voices	3 episodes	
2018–20	Barbie Dreamhouse Adventures	George, Ron Slusher		
2018	Voltron: Legendary Defender	Seok Jin		
2019	Cannon Busters	9ine, Additional voices	English dub	
2019	The Lion Guard	Seisou, Peacock Leader, Mouse Deer		
2019–21	Power Players	Sarge Charge		
2019	The Casagrandes	Pirate Byron	Episode: "Arrr in the Family"	
2020	Scissor Seven	Wedding Host, Lizard, others	English dub	
2020–22	Jurassic World Camp Cretaceous	Dr. Henry Wu		
2021–23	Star Wars: Visions	Roden, Master Leesagum, Shopkeeper	English dub	
2022	Barbie: It Takes Two	George Roberts		
2023–24	Barbie: A Touch of Magic	George Roberts		
2024–present	Grimsburg	Lt. John Kang		
2024	Jentry Chau vs. the Underworld	Mr. Cheng, Wallabee		
2025	Jurassic World: Chaos Theory	Dr. Henry Wu	Episode: "Familiar Faces"	

=== Video games ===
List of voice performances in video games
Year	Game	Role	Notes	Source
2010	Vindictus	Narrator, Elchulus		
2011	Dragon Nest	Velskud, Barnak, Auction House Master Shylock		
2012–14, 2016, 2020	World of Warcraft	Emperor Shaohao, Ariok, Altruis the Sufferer, Jarod Shadowsong, Anduin Lothar, others	Mists of Pandaria, Warlords of Draenor, Legion, Shadowlands	
2013	Leisure Suit Larry: Reloaded	Lefty, Come 'n' Go Clerk, Adam, Kickstarter Patron #1		
2013	Disney Infinity		Credited under Voice Talents	
2013	Lightning Returns: Final Fantasy XIII	Additional voices		
2014	InFamous: Second Son	Male Pedestrian #1		
2014	Diablo III: Reaper of Souls	Additional voices		
2014	Infamous: First Light	Additional voices		
2015	Citizens of Earth		Uncredited	
2015	The Battle of Sol	Mr. Chen		
2015	League of Legends	Master Yi (Project: Yi)		
2015	Armored Warfare			
2015	Fallout 4	Marowski, Vault 111 Overseer	Overseer role credited as "Vault-Tec scientist"	
2015	Rise of the Tomb Raider	Additional Voices		
2016	Tom Clancy's The Division			
2016	Overwatch	Dr. Harold Winston		
2016	World of Final Fantasy		English dub	
2017	Heroes of the Storm	Samuro (Monkey King)		
2017	Fire Emblem Heroes	Lukas, Eldigan, Ephraim, Ike	English dub	
2017	Nier: Automata	Adam	English dub	
2017	Crusaders of Light	Northern Army Soldier		
2017	Fire Emblem Echoes: Shadows of Valentia	Lukas	English dub	
2017	Valkyria Revolution	Amleth Gronkjaer	English dub	
2017	Tacoma	Andrew Dagyab		
2018	Detective Pikachu	Hiro Morgan	English dub	
2018	BlazBlue: Cross Tag Battle	Carmine-Prime	English Dub; A character from Under Night In-Birth series	
2018	Octopath Traveler	Alfyn Greengrass	English dub	
2018	Star Control: Origins	Trandals	English dub	
2018	Valkyria Chronicles 4	Raz	English dub	
2018	Just Cause 4	People of Solis	English dub	
2018	Super Smash Bros. Ultimate	Ike	English dub	
2018	Epic Seven	Garo, Enott		
2019	Ace Combat 7: Skies Unknown	Count	English dub	
2019	Kingdom Hearts III	Additional Voices	English dub	
2019	Left Alive	Additional Voices		
2019	Zanki Zero: Last Beginning	Yosuke Kurosaki, Kurosuke, Creature of Sloth, Mourner A	English dub	
2019	World War Z	Hiroji		
2019	Judgment	Takayuki Yagami	English dub	
2019	Eliza	Rainer		
2019	Remnant: From the Ashes	Player (Male)		
2019	River City Girls	Kunio		
2019	Daemon X Machina	Deva	English dub	
2019	AI: The Somnium Files	Kaname Date, Saito Sejima	English dub	
2019	Asgard's Wrath	Stikkan		
2019	Shenmue III	Wuying Ren	English dub	
2019	Call of Duty: Mobile	Hidora Kai		
2019	SaGa: Scarlet Grace – Ambitions	Antonius	English dub	
2020	Space Channel 5 VR: Kinda Funky News Flash	Glitter	English dub	
2020	Persona 5 Strikers	Additional voices	English dub	
2020	Granblue Fantasy Versus	Lowain, Referee	English dub	
2020	Final Fantasy VII Remake	Scotch	English dub	
2020	Fallout 76: Wastelanders	Fishbones, Dr. Lee, Free Radicals	Fishbones role credited as "Billy"	
2020	The Last of Us Part II	Additional voices		
2020	Yakuza: Like a Dragon	Yu Nanba	English dub	
2020	Call of Duty: Black Ops Cold War	Kapano "Naga" Vang		
2021	Lost Judgment	Takayuki Yagami	English dub	
2021	Demon Slayer: Kimetsu no Yaiba – The Hinokami Chronicles	Muzan Kibutsuji	English dub	
2021	Shin Megami Tensei V	Additional voices	English dub	
2022	Ghostwire: Tokyo	Man D	English dub	
2022	AI: The Somnium Files – Nirvana Initiative	Kaname Date	English dub	
2022	Saints Row	Kevin		
2022	We Are OFK	Peter Jung, Ludivg "Biggs" Magnusson, Ming Zhang		
2022	River City Girls 2	Kunio, Burnov, Yakuza Henchman, Kodani	English dub	
2023	Fire Emblem Engage	Ike, Ephraim	English dub	
2023	Remnant 2	Playable character voice 4		
2023	Granblue Fantasy Versus: Rising	Lowain, Referee	English dub	
2024	Like a Dragon: Infinite Wealth	Yu Nanba	English dub	
2024	Granblue Fantasy: Relink	Referee	English dub	
2024	Final Fantasy VII Rebirth	Scotch	English dub	
2024	Rise of the Rōnin	Nobutomo Odani	English dub	
2024	Demon Slayer: Kimetsu no Yaiba – Sweep the Board	Muzan Kibutsuji	English dub	
2024	Metaphor: ReFantazio	More	English dub	
2025	Yakuza 0 Director's Cut	Akira Nishikiyama, additional voices	English dub, singing voice only	
2025	No Sleep for Kaname Date – From AI: The Somnium Files	Kaname Date	English dub	
2025	Demon Slayer: Kimetsu no Yaiba – The Hinokami Chronicles 2	Muzan Kibutsuji	English dub	
2026	Yakuza Kiwami 3 & Dark Ties	Additional voices	English dub	
TBA	Deadlock	Pocket, Shiv	Uncredited, early access	
TBA	KurtzPel		English dub, early access	

=== Other ===
List of performances in other works
Year	Series	Role	Notes	Source
2005	SpongeBob SquarePants 4-D Ride		Film simulator ride	
2017	Internet @$$holes		Voice over role, webseries	
