= Judgment (video game) =

2018 video game

- Developer: Ryu Ga Gotoku Studio
- Publisher: Sega
- Director: Koji Yoshida
- Producers: Kazuki Hosokawa; Daisuke Sato; Mitsuhiro Shimano
- Designer: Masao Shirosaki
- Programmer: Yutaka Ito
- Artist: Naoki Someya
- Writers: Tsuyoshi Furuta; Toshihiro Nagoshi
- Composers: Hidenori Shoji; Yuri Fukuda; Chihiro Aoki; Saori Yoshida; Yuki Kobayashi
- Series: Yakuza
- Platforms: PlayStation 4; PlayStation 5; Stadia; Xbox Series X/S; Windows
- Release: PlayStation 4: JP: December 13, 2018; WW: June 25, 2019; PS5, Stadia, XSX/S: WW: April 23, 2021; Luna: US: December 16, 2021; Windows: WW: September 14, 2022
- Genre: Action-adventure
- Mode: Single-player

Judgment (Note: Known in Japan as Judge Eyes: Shinigami no Yuigon (Japanese: JUDGE EYES(ジャッジアイズ)：死神の遺言; lit. Judge Eyes: Wills of Death)) is a 2018 action-adventure video game developed by Ryu Ga Gotoku Studio and published by Sega. A spin-off to the Yakuza series, it was released for the PlayStation 4 in December 2018 in Japan and June 2019, worldwide. A remastered version of the game, with the subtitle Remastered (Note: Known in Japan as Judge Eyes: Shinigami no Yuigon Remastered (Japanese: JUDGE EYES(ジャッジアイズ)：死神の遺言 Remastered(リマスタード); lit. Judge Eyes: Wills of Death Remastered)) in Japan and Asia, was released for the PlayStation 5, Stadia, and Xbox Series X and Series S in April 2021. A port for Amazon Luna was made available on December 16, 2021. A Windows port was released on 14 September 2022 through Steam. Judgment follows lawyer-turned-detective Takayuki Yagami and his allies as they explore a case involving corpses whose eyes have been removed. The player controls Yagami in the fictional Tokyo district of Kamurocho, where he fights thugs and yakuza while carrying out missions involving chasing, stealth, and searching for clues.

The game began its initial development in 2015 under the codename Project Judge. The game originated from Sega's desire to create a new IP with Toshihiro Nagoshi serving as the writer. Nagoshi wanted to write a new type of story with a detective working on a case that contrasted with Nagoshi's previous work in the Kiryu-era Like A Dragon games. As a result, the developers designed the game to be accessible to detective-game newcomers. Singer and actor Takuya Kimura, who provided both facial features and Japanese voice acting, was cast to play Yagami. Due to popular demand, the game includes an English voice-over dub as well as subtitles in several additional languages. The Japanese rock band Alexandros produced two songs for the game.

Judgment was withdrawn from the Japanese market in March 2019 following the arrest of Pierre Taki, one of the game's actors, for suspected cocaine use. While localizing the game for international markets, Taki's likeness was removed and his voice acting performance was replaced by actor Miou Tanaka, with a new face model being created to replace Taki's likeness.

Judgment received a generally positive response from critics. Many praised the game's plot, side content and combat but criticized the simplicity of its investigation mechanics. Judgment was a commercial success, topping one million and earned recognition as one of the best video games released in 2019. The remaster was praised for improving the game's frame rate and visuals. A sequel, Lost Judgment, released on September 24, 2021.

== Gameplay ==
One of the game's "tailing" sections, with Yagami (right) following a person of interest

Judgment is an action-adventure game with a third-person perspective. It follows private detective Takayuki Yagami as he investigates a serial murder case in Kamurocho, a fictional district of Tokyo, Japan, previously featured in the Yakuza franchise. When asked about similarities between Judgment and other Yakuza titles, series creator Toshihiro Nagoshi said that "the location and assets might be the same, but the gameplay and story here are drastically different". Yagami can buy items to restore his health in stores based on real-life counterparts, similar to the Yakuza games. However, Yagami can suffer from Mortal Wounds, which permanently decreases Yagami's maximum health. The only way to recover is to visit an underground doctor for treatment or purchase a medical kit, which are relatively expensive.

Judgment features a combat system where players can change between two different fighting styles: crane-style, which focuses on fighting groups of enemies, and tiger-style, which focuses on fighting individuals. Yagami also incorporates parkour elements, like wall-running and leapfrogging, in his fighting style. Similar to the previous games in the Yakuza series, Yagami can perform brutal takedowns of enemies through "EX Actions" (a fundamentally identical system to Like a Dragon's Heat Actions), enter an enhanced state where he becomes stronger in battle, labelled "EX Boost" in Judgment, and can team up with allies to perform powerful combination attacks. Accomplishing sidequests or achievements in the main narrative rewards the player with points that can be used to enhance Yagami's skills and teach him new techniques.

The game also features an investigation mode, where the player must search a scene for clues and evidence of a crime. Players must infiltrate areas by lock picking and use disguises to gather information or find objects of interest. The game has sections where the player pursues a suspect. These take the form of tailing sequences, where players must follow a suspect while avoiding being seen, and chase sequences, where players must avoid oncoming obstacles while running to catch a fleeing suspect.

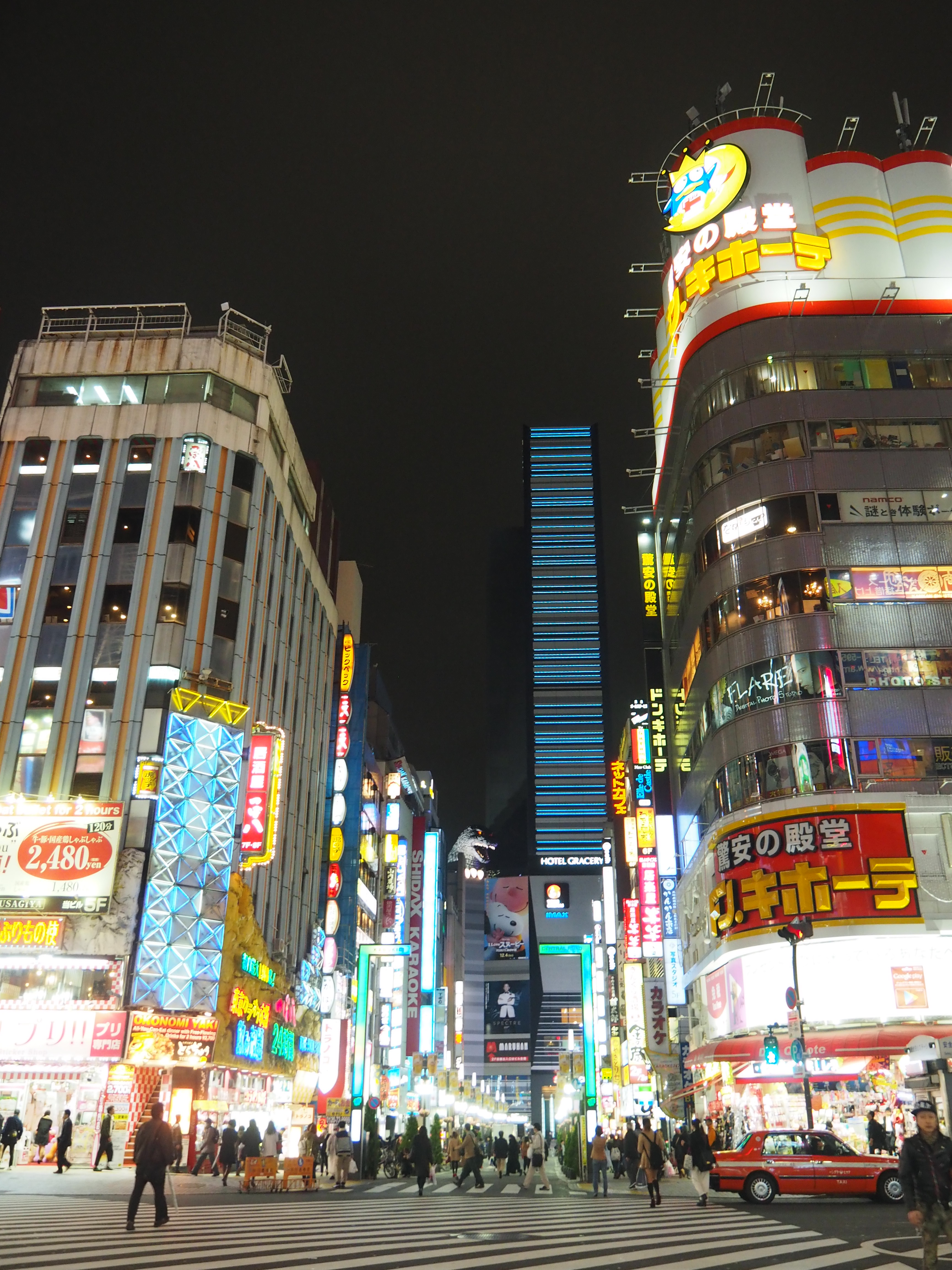
Real shops are used in the game to furnish items.

Yagami can take on several side cases in addition to the main storyline, similar to the "substories" in other Yakuza games. He can undertake them by looking at the noticeboard in his office, asking at the Genda Law Office or Bar Tender, or by walking the streets of Kamurocho. Certain meetings trigger a Friendship level that can evolve across the game through interacting with a character. Some of these meetings involve finishing sidequests, while other scenarios are inspired by dating sim games. Like other Yakuza titles, the player can find minigames and side activities scattered around Kamurocho, which include drone racing, a virtual reality board game, and fully playable versions of Space Harrier, Fantasy Zone, Fighting Vipers, Motor Raid, Out Run, Virtua Fighter 5: Final Showdown, and Puyo Puyo.

== Synopsis ==
=== Setting and characters ===
Judgment takes place in 2018, and stars Takayuki Yagami (Takuya Kimura/Greg Chun), a former attorney-turned-private investigator residing in the Kamurochō district. The story of Judgment involves Yagami investigating several yakuza murder cases committed by an unidentified serial killer, dubbed "the Mole", which eventually leads to him uncovering a massive conspiracy linked to his last case from his attorney days. Yagami's supporting cast includes: Masaharu Kaito (Shinshū Fuji/Crispin Freeman), a former member of the Tojo Clan's Matsugane Family who is Yagami's detective partner; Ryuzo Genda (Akira Nakao/Brian McNamara), director of Genda Law Office and Yagami's former mentor who is also one of his father figures; Mitsugu Matsugane (Tomomichi Nishimura/JB Blanc), patriarch of the Matsugane Family who raised Yagami after the latter's parents were murdered; Saori Shirosaki (Yūko Kaida/Aimée Castle), Issei Hoshino (Yū Hayashi/Joe Zieja), and Masamichi Shintani (Takuya Kirimoto/Keythe Farley), defense attorneys working at Genda Law Office; Mafuyu Fujii (Risa Shimizu/Cherami Leigh), a public prosecutor and close friend of Yagami and Shirosaki; Makoto Tsukumo (Jun Miyamoto/River Kanoff), a recluse and technology expert who often assists Yagami in his investigation; Toru Higashi (Yoshihisa Kawahara/Steve Blum), a Matsugane Family member who looks up to Kaito; Fumiya Sugiura (Junta Terashima/Mark Whitten), a masked thief who offers to help Yagami's investigation with unknown motivations; and Kazuya Ayabe (Kenichi Takitō/Matthew Yang King), a corrupt police officer who sells top-secret information for his own gains.

Yagami's investigation of the Mole brings him into conflict with several characters: Kyohei Hamura (Miou Tanaka/Fred Tatasciore), captain of the Matsugane family who has ties to the murder cases; Mitsuru Kuroiwa (Shōsuke Tanihara/Matthew Mercer), a detective working for the Tokyo Metropolitan Police Department's organized crime division; Yoji Shono (Makoto Nagai/Michael Gough), a researcher at the Advanced Drug Development Center (ADDC); Ryusuke Kido (Hiroshi Shirokuma/Andrew Morgado), the director of the ADDC; and Kaoru Ichinose (Takaya Hashi/Kirk Thornton), the Vice Minister of Health who oversees the ADDC's activities. Other characters featured in the main story include: Shinpei Okubo (Shinji Kawada/Yuri Lowenthal), a former ADDC janitor who was acquitted from a murder charge by Yagami, only to be arrested for allegedly murdering his girlfriend, Emi Terasawa (Eri Goda/Amy Walker); Ko Hattori (Tetsu Shiratori/Sunil Malhotra), a reporter who is in constant conflict with Yagami and created the smear campaign against him following Okubo's second arrest; Shigeru Kajihira (Haruhiko Jō/Ed O'Ross), chairman of the Kajihira Group and secret financial backer of the Kyorei Clan, a Kyoto-based yakuza organization; Satoshi Shioya (Masaki Terasoma/Keith Silverstein), captain of the Kyorei Clan; and Kunihiko Morita (Junpei Morita/Jamieson Price), chief prosecutor and Fujii's superior.

=== Plot ===
In 2015, attorney Takayuki Yagami investigates the Advanced Drug Development Center (ADDC) for the death of patient Koichi Waku, successfully clearing accused worker Shinpei Okubo of the murder charge. However, Okubo is arrested shortly thereafter for allegedly murdering his girlfriend, Emi Terasawa. Guilt-ridden, Yagami resigns from his law firm.

Three years later, Yagami has become a private detective in Tokyo's Kamurocho district and accepts investigation requests with his partner, ex-Tojo clan member Masaharu Kaito. A serial killer has recently been murdering yakuza members in Kamurocho and removing their eyes. Yagami accepts a murder case concerning Matsugane Family captain Kyohei Hamura, who is suspected of killing a Kyorei clan member using the same methods. Yagami investigates and proves Hamura's innocence, though he suspects that Hamura is working with the killer, whom Yagami dubs the Mole. Yagami investigates a brothel where one of the victims was last seen and encounters Hamura, who orders him to stop investigating the Mole.

Yagami returns to his office to find that the Mole has killed Masamichi Shintani, his former colleague, and teacher. Yagami finds a recent call on Shintani's phone for a researcher of the ADDC, Yoji Shono. He questions ADDC director Ryusuke Kido about Shintani's phone call, to no avail. After further investigation, with help from masked thief Fumiya Sugiura, Yagami meets construction mogul Shigeru Kajihira at a Kyorei Clan hideout. Kajihira reveals a failed plan to seize land around the ADDC for redevelopment, which was foiled when researchers claimed to have discovered AD-9, a potential cure for Alzheimer's disease. Kajihira asks Yagami to investigate the death of former ADDC vice-director Toru Hashiki.

Yagami is brought to the public prosecutor's office for interrogation and is informed that Kazuya Ayabe, a crooked cop who was Yagami's informant, has been arrested on suspicion of being the Mole; Yagami, however, is unconvinced. He and Kaito find Hamura hiding out in an underground illegal gambling den and question him about his connection to the Mole and other possible suspects. Yagami concludes that Shono may be organizing the murders before Hamura is rescued by Matsugane Family members. He theorizes that the Mole's killings are actually human experiments to test the effectiveness of AD-9, and Waku, Hashiki, and Shintani's deaths were failed experiments. Yagami also theorizes that Okubo did not kill Terasawa; she was killed by Shono so that he could frame Okubo as an unrepentant serial murderer.

Kaito is taken hostage by Hamura, forcing Yagami to storm a Matsugane hideout. Yagami finds Hamura and Kaito, defeating and capturing Hamura with the help of his patriarch, Mitsugu Matsugane. Yagami and Matsugane transport Hamura to a Kyorei clan hideout and interrogate him, learning that Hamura worked as a human trafficker for the ADDC and helped frame Ayabe for Shintani's murder. The Mole appears and shoots at Hamura, but Matsugane shields him and is killed. Guilt-ridden, Hamura reveals that the Mole is Mitsuru Kuroiwa, a detective in the Metropolitan organized crime division, and later gives Yagami definitive evidence that the ADDC participated in Shintani's murder.

During Ayabe's trial, Japanese Vice Minister of Health Kaoru Ichinose covertly arranges a hit on Kuroiwa. Kuroiwa kills his assailants and storms the ADDC. Yagami, aided by his friends, finds Kuroiwa taking Shono hostage, intending to force him to finish developing AD-9. Yagami defeats Kuroiwa, and the police surround them, killing Kuroiwa when he tries to kill Shono. Shono injects himself with a new version of AD-9 and dies from its side effects after his eyes turn blue. Kido confirms Shono's human experiments at Ayabe's trial and explains that the victims had their eyes removed to conceal evidence of experimentation. The court acquits Ayabe; Ichinose and chief prosecutor Kunihiko Morita are imprisoned for their involvement; Kajihira is placed under investigation; Okubo is freed after three years on death row and reconciles with Sugiura, who is revealed to be Terasawa's younger brother; and Yagami and Kaito resume their daily work lives.

== Development ==
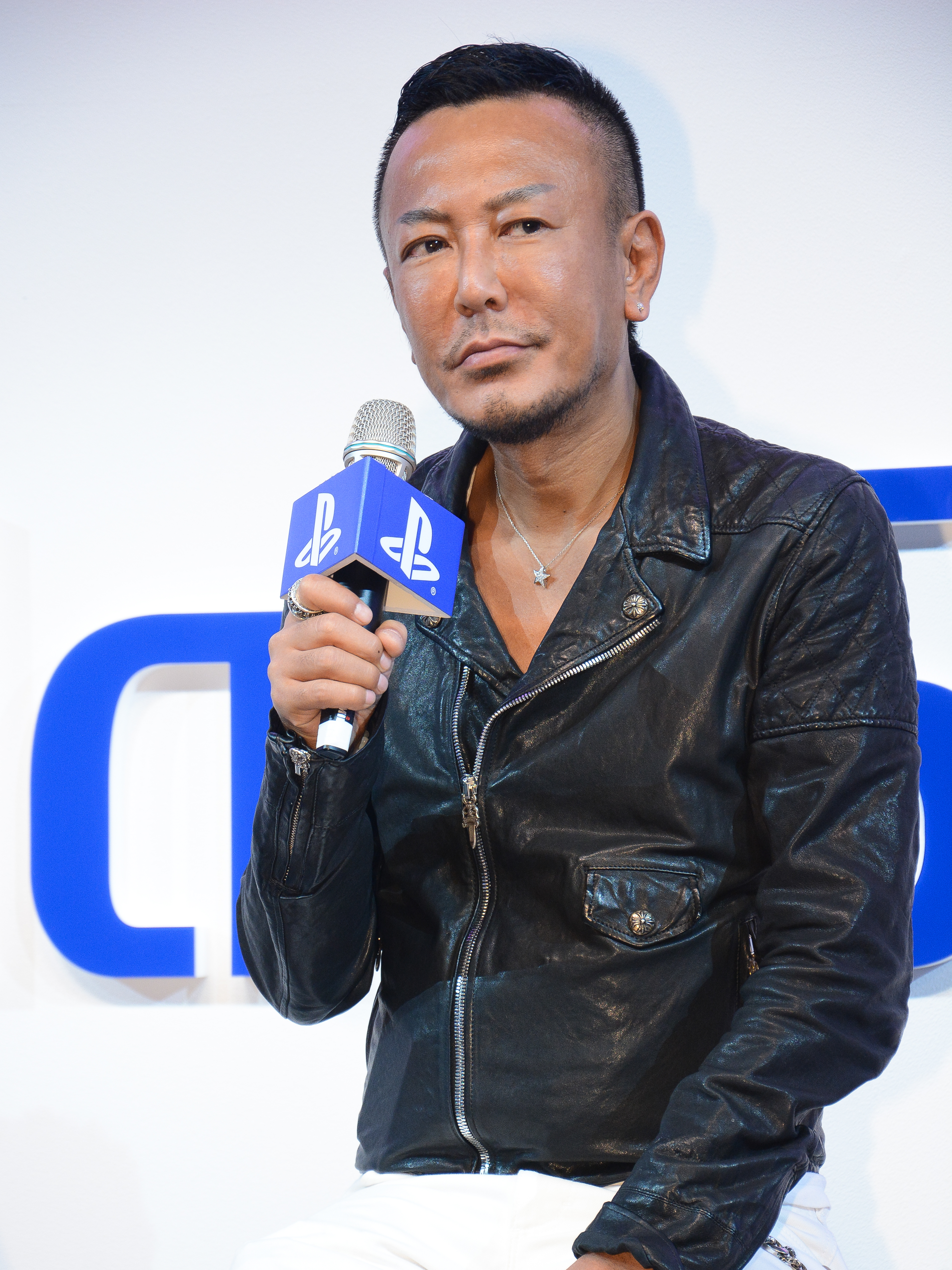
Writer and executive director Toshihiro Nagoshi

Ideas for Judgment were conceived after the release of Yakuza 5. Producer Kazuki Hosokawa suggested that Sega produce a new IP instead of focusing solely on the Yakuza series. Senior Executive Manager Daisuke Sato originally believed that Yakuza would only last three games but agreed with Hosokawa about the need to create a new title. Sega hired new employees, who were asked about their preferences to get ideas for the new game. The development of Judgment began in 2015, and was first hinted at in August 2018 during a Sega live stream by the series' director Toshihiro Nagoshi, who called it "something completely different". Hosokawa and Nagoshi refrained from calling Judgment a spin-off from Yakuza, despite its development by the same team, because of its different narrative. Nagoshi said that he enjoyed the finished product.

The game uses the Dragon Engine to produce graphics similar to Yakuza 6: The Song of Life. The team enhanced the game engine to improve character design, changing the game's lighting to emphasize its theme of "legal suspense". The team decided to explore the fictional city of Kamurocho (from Yakuza) using a different approach. Similar to Yakuza, real-world shops such as Don Quijote were used to impart realism. A "friendship" system was developed to characterize Yagami's personality as he forms bonds with several non-playable characters, which integrates them into the setting. His traits are balanced in the main story and the sidequests for a balance between seriousness and comedy—his seriousness is explored in the main story, while comedy is featured in the sidequests.

Although Hosokawa wanted to provide players with as much content as Yakuza 0, he said that the team refrained from using returning characters from the Yakuza series. Since Yagami is a lawyer, they wanted to give players the option of emulating Yagami's actions by choosing his thoughts. Some segments from the friendship system were made to emulate dating sims. According to Nagoshi, it was tricky to decide how expansive or difficult the detective work should be. The puzzle gameplay and central mystery were made to be challenging yet accessible to a casual player. Action segments were designed for more skilled players, making them carefully plan the abilities to give Yagami.

=== Characters ===
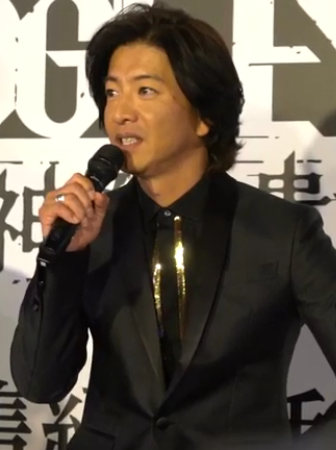
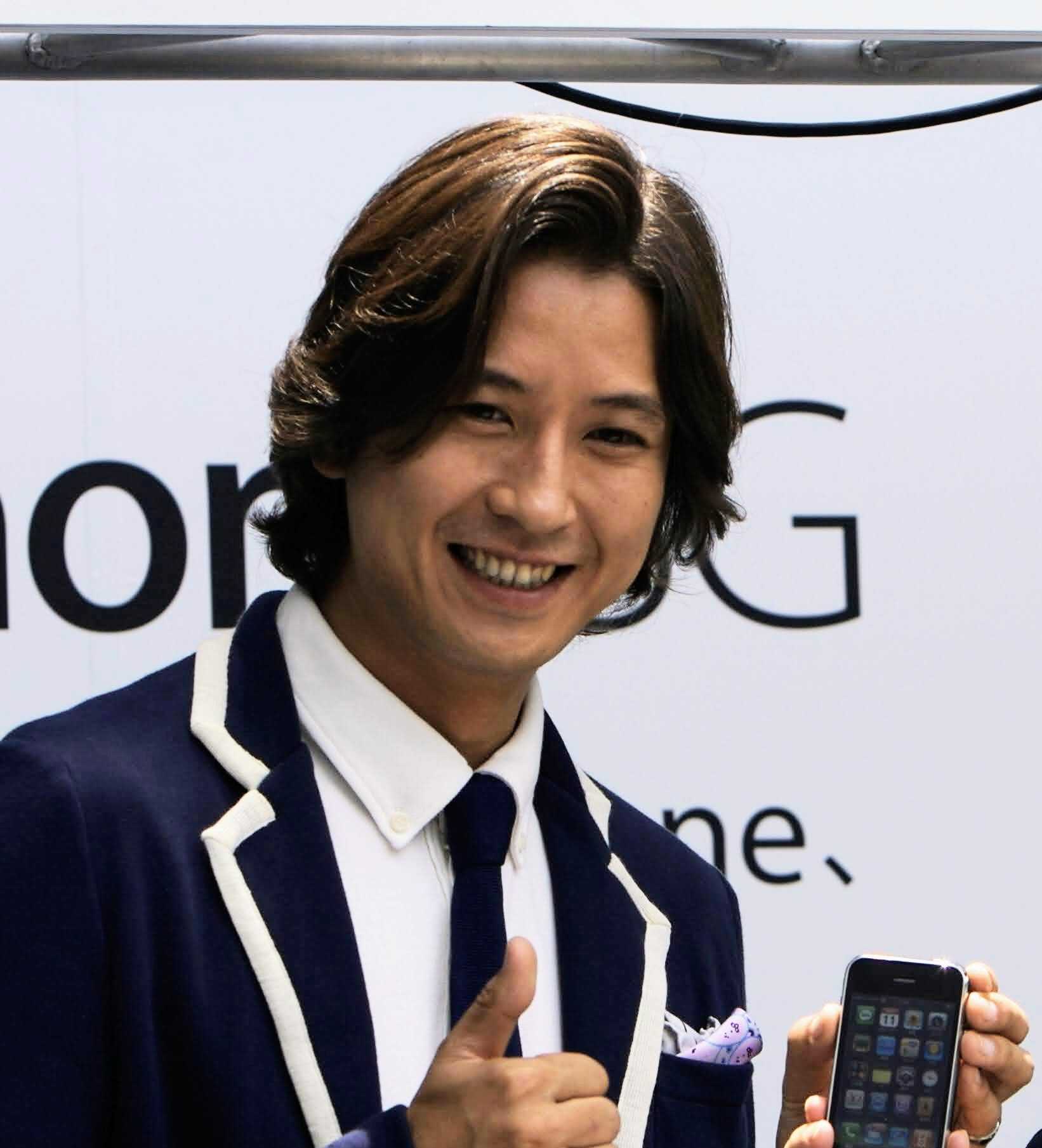
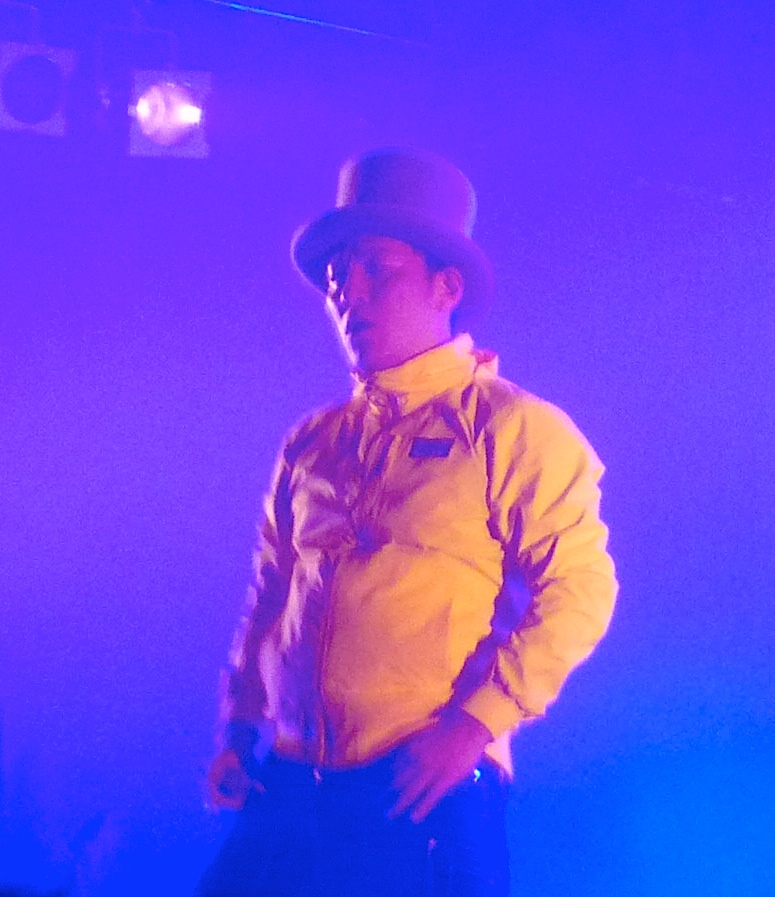
The Japanese voice cast from Judgment include Takuya Kimura (Yagami), Shōsuke Tanihara (Kuroiwa), and Pierre Taki (Hamura).

According to Nagoshi, Cinema of Korea were Yagami's primary influences. Since the story of Yakuza's protagonist Kazuma Kiryu ended with Yakuza 6: The Song of Life, Ryu Ga Gotoku Studio's game developers wanted to create a distinctive character for Judgment. At the direction of producer Kazuki Hosokawa, the team decided that the character should be a detective. To generate a major contrast between the Yagami and Kiryu, staff wanted to make Yagami a more relatable character based on the troubles that caused him to quit being a lawyer. The details of Yagami's past, as well as his new life as a detective, were elaborated on to attract players to him. Because of the popularity of detective stories, Yagami was written to obtain knowledge throughout the game, along with the player. Yagami's largest influence was the Paul Newman film The Verdict, in which the main character suffers a similar crisis over his career as a lawyer. Similar to the Yakuza series, Judgment primarily focuses on its story.

Early in Judgment's production, the Sega staff considered using a movie star to develop Yagami and chose Takuya Kimura. Nagoshi remembers being surprised and thrilled when Kimura was selected because of the number of plot twists that he could be used in. Despite this, he was concerned that fans would consider the game to be lighthearted because of the stylish Kimura compared with the team's previous work. Several of the Yagami's elements were produced with Kimura's approval. Since detective dramas are uncommon in gaming, Hosokawa wanted Yagami to stand out, so creating the new character presented a challenge. For Yagami to properly succeed Kiryu, the developers wanted him to be "more grounded to fit the noir vibe". According to Nagoshi:

"[W]hen you're writing a story and there's a really solid character that's been around for a long time, the character dictates what happens next ... In contrast to that, with Yagami, at the start of development we didn't really have anything attached to him at all. It was a challenge, but also an opportunity for a development team that has been working so long on the same series."

Real detectives inspired the team's portrayal of Yagami's life and work. The plot's original focus on romance was eliminated because Nagoshi felt that it would affect the game's courtroom-thriller feel. Localization producer Scott Strichart observed that the portrayals of yakuza are faithful to the main series due to multiple characters being involved in the clans. Yagami was noted for standing out among the cast as he has multiple life choices in contrast to the other cast members, who are forced to be yakuza.

Multiple actors were chosen based on their experience. Akira Nakao plays attorney Ryuzo Genda, who looked after Yagami when he was a lawyer. Shosuke Tanihara was cast as detective Mitsuru Kuroiwa because of his strong visual appearance, making impressive scenes when he and Kimura appear together. Pierre Taki was cast as Kyohei Hamura because of his history of portraying famous criminals. While Yagami is linked with multiple female characters, none of them were created as a love interest to avoid using romance in the narrative. Other recurring actors include Kenichi Takitō as detective Kazuya Ayabe, Shinshū Fuji as former yakuza Masaharu Kaito, and Risa Shimizu as Mafuyu Fujii.

=== Music ===
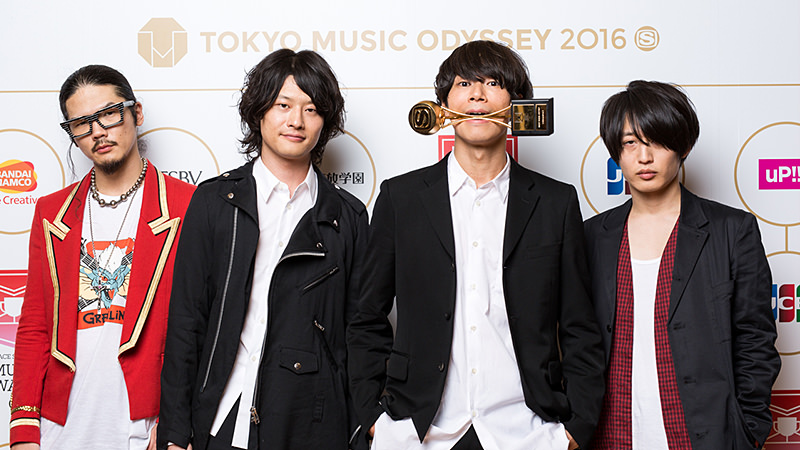
Japanese band Alexandros did the two main themes for Judgment.

The studio spent a considerable amount of time choosing the right band for the music. Nagoshi felt that using the Japanese band Alexandros would appeal to the audience, in the same way that Shōnan no Kaze fit Yakuza 0, as he believed that both bands have a similar approach. Alexandros were excited to compose the two theme songs, which were intended to provide musical diversity and describe the drama in the game. Nagoshi gave Alexandros creative freedom, and there were no major issues. He showed the band a demo of the game, enabling them to write a song quickly. Two theme songs were created for the game: the main theme song, "Arpeggio" and the insert song, "Your Song". The band created these themes for Judgment while they were in the United States, but sent their work to Japan in a video and received a positive response. "Arpeggio" was written on the rooftop of a Brooklyn studio: Yoohei Kawakami took a liking to an arpeggio that Masaki Shirai, the guitarist, happened to be playing, so the band wrote the song on acoustic guitars on the roof while on a break during their recording session. A three-CD soundtrack was released in Japan on April 15, 2019.

=== Localization ===
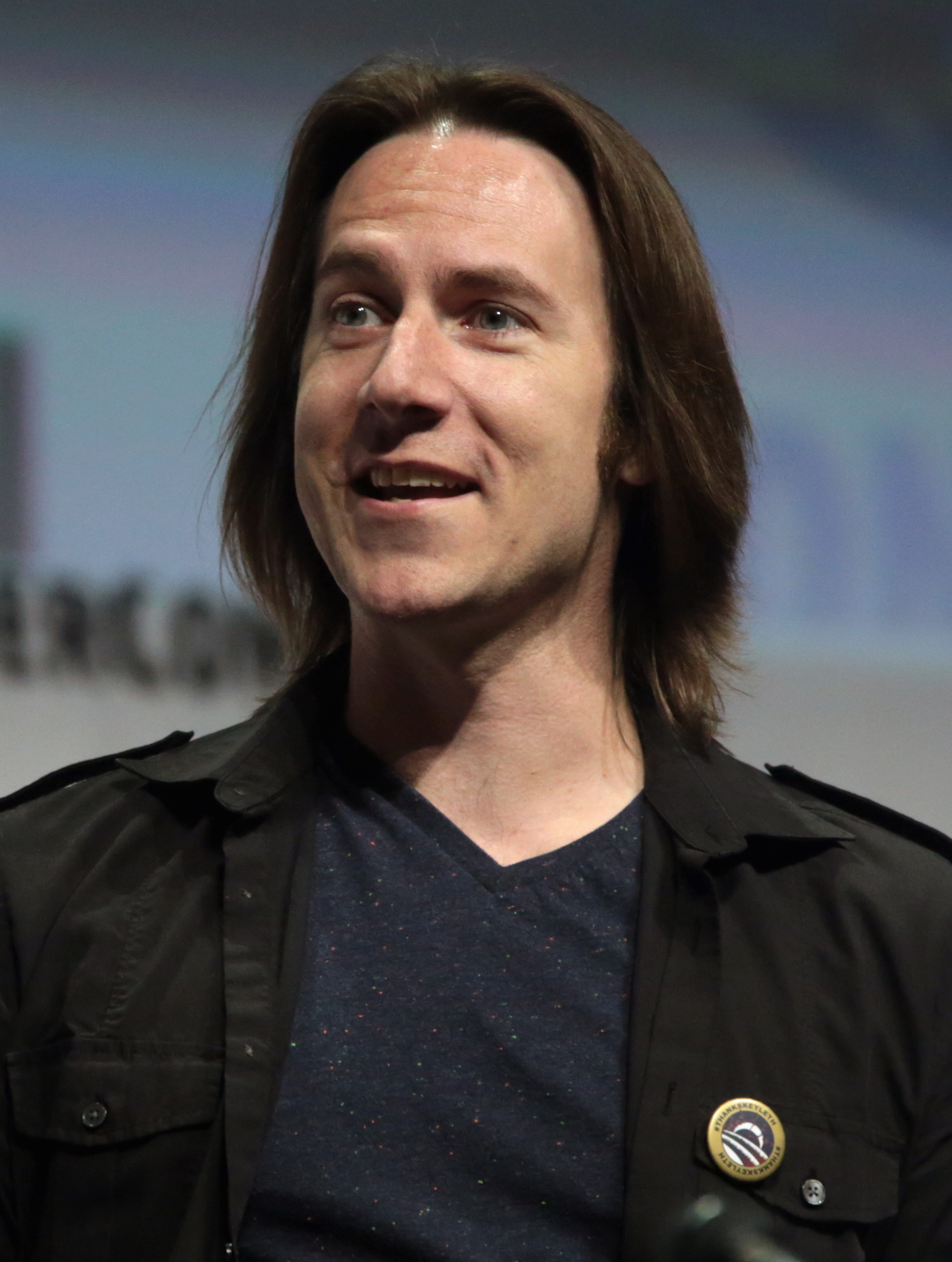
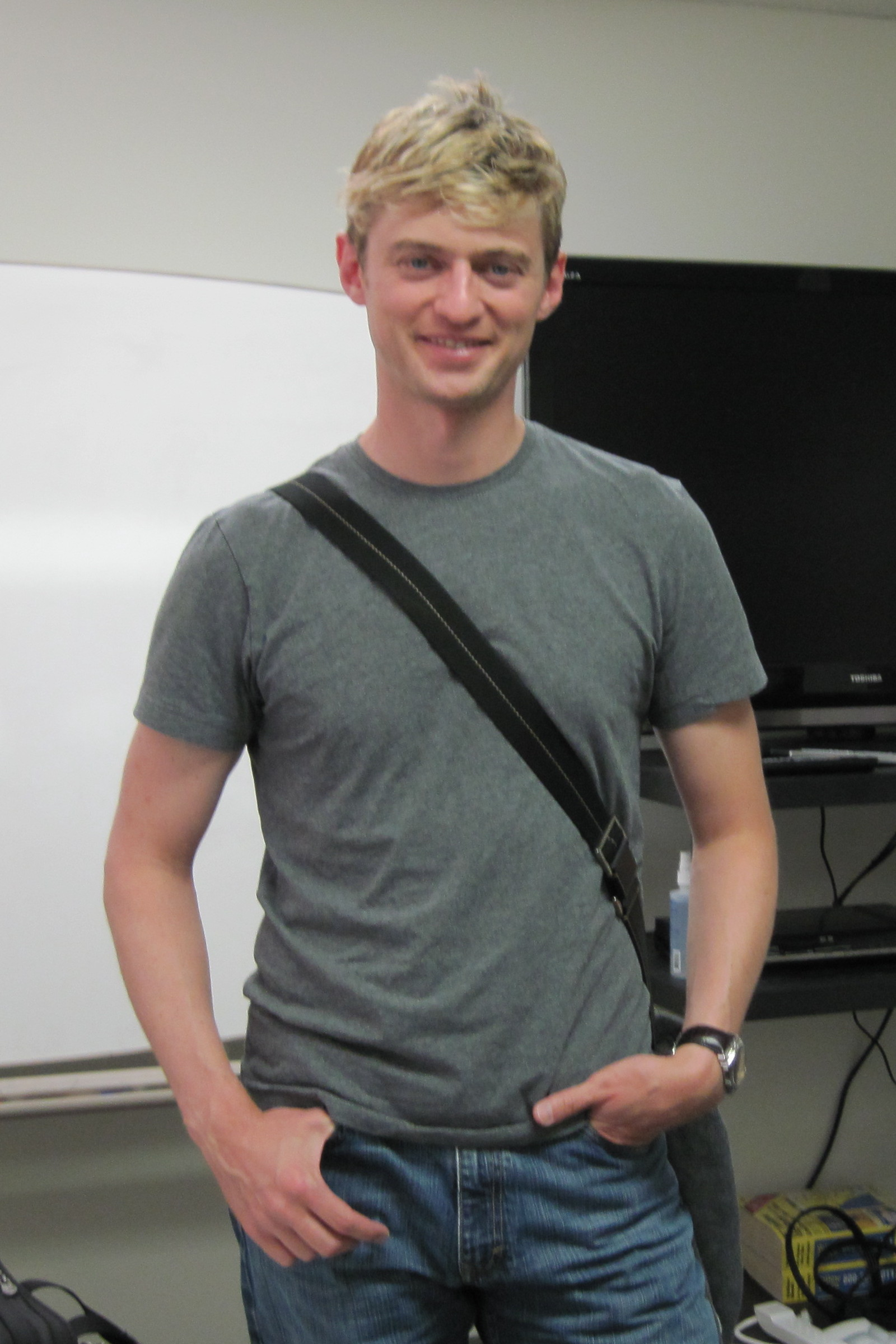
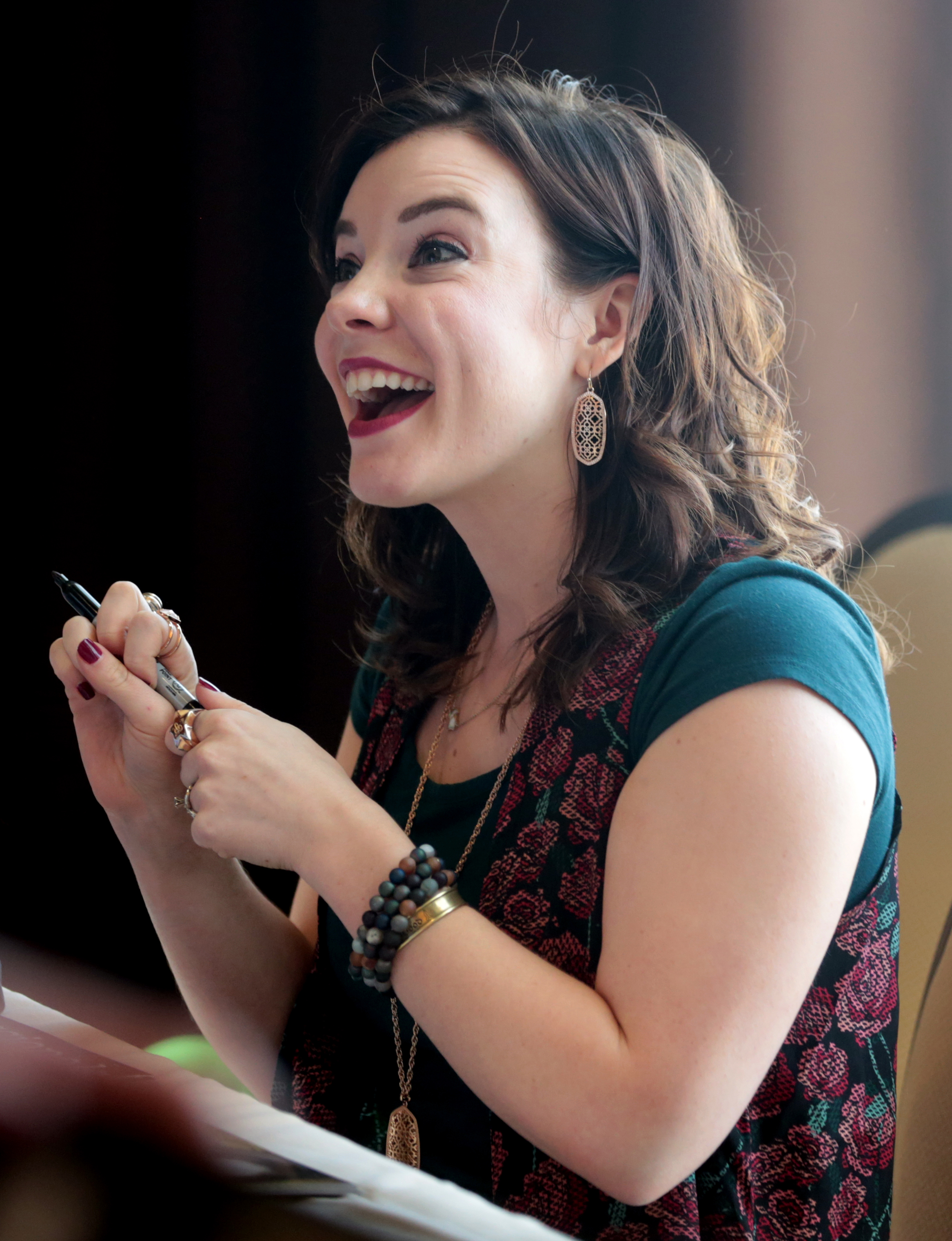
The English voice cast from Judgment includes Matthew Mercer, Crispin Freeman, and Cherami Leigh.

Unlike the Yakuza series, the studio decided to give Judgment an English dub, which was conceived following the release of Yakuza 0. Since the games in the Yakuza series were almost always released with only Japanese audio, Sega thought it might not fit the tone to give Yakuza 6 an English dub. So, Sega believed that Judgment would be a better choice as the studio's first English dub localization, as it could attract newcomers to the series. Sega announced that other languages would follow. The dub was released as a response to increased fan demand, hence there was a short timeframe before its release. The staff stated that the game's Western version would be identical to the Japanese version. Scott Strichart, the localization producer for the Yakuza series, ordered the Western release to have two subtitle tracks: one with Japanese audio and English subtitles matching the Japanese translation, and the other with subtitles matching the English dub. There were also localizations with French, German, Italian, and Spanish subtitles designed for the Japanese audio, regardless of the selected voice language. The remastered version has dual audio and nine subtitle and text languages—the previous five languages, as well as Japanese, Simplified Chinese (a new localized language first introduced in Yakuza: Like a Dragon International), Traditional Chinese, and Korean. The developers believed they had managed to make the dubbed Yagami identical to the Japanese version in terms of characterization, despite having different words in the translation. Following the changes, the staff made revisions to the character's facial animations to fit the lip-syncing. In scripting, Strichart insisted that the English actors keep using Japanese honorifics to retain the Japanese cast's impact. A game demo became available in August 2019 for English-speaking regions.

During the game, there is a scene in which players control Saori Shirosaki to infiltrate a hostess club; she receives catcalls from bystanders on the way to the club. Strichart said that "sensitive scenes are tricky to get right" and that the team had to be careful when dubbing this. He added that to bring realism into the narrative, the non-playable characters' responses to Shirosaki would come across as "uncomfortable", as they were denigrating her during this scene. Since the Yakuza series was primarily popular among men, Strichart wanted English-language players to feel "gross" from these bystanders' catcalls and empathize with Shirosaki and women in general for enduring this treatment regularly.

Multiple auditions were held to cast the English-language voice actors, aiming to make the English dub as natural as possible. Greg Chun was pleasantly surprised when he was selected to voice Yagami in Judgment since he was familiar with the franchise. Chun said, "I'm super psyched to be a part of this game", adding that he liked what he had seen of the character. He called his work in the game satisfying: "It really did require me to let go of the tricks that you use to push a performance through, and I really did need to fall back on authenticity and genuine groundedness." Although he found the faithfulness to the original Japanese audio challenging, Chun was pleased with his character's balance of seriousness and comedy; however, the game's screaming segments were difficult. Noting that fans tended to choose the original Japanese audio, Chun suggested that they try the English dub to test his voice. He was surprised by Yagami's deep character arc, which involved Yagami's present life as well as dealing with his past life as a lawyer, and said that he would never forget the role. Matthew Mercer enjoyed voicing Kuroiwa but found the character's different tones to be challenging. Crispin Freeman enjoyed his work because he considered Kaito to be likable. Other actors include Brian McNamara as Genda, Matthew Yang King as Ayabe, and Cherami Leigh as Fujii.

== Release ==
The new character model for Hamura (left) and Pierre Taki's model before his removal

Judgment was announced under the Japanese title of Judge Eyes on September 10, 2018, at the PlayStation Lineup Tour shortly before Tokyo Game Show 2018. The announcement was made to market the game for the Japanese holidays; its production had been completed and the team was busy debugging it. Sega scheduled it to be on Japanese store shelves in December 2018, with a planned Western release in 2019. The game's first chapter was first released as a demo on November 29, 2018, on the Japanese PlayStation Network.

Sega released the game in Japan on December 13, 2018. They halted Japanese sales of the game on March 13, 2019, after Pierre Taki, a Japanese actor whose voice and likeness had been used for the character of Kyohei Hamura, was arrested for cocaine possession and use by officers of the Narcotics Control Department (NCD) of the Ministry of Health, Labour and Welfare. Sega did not comment on whether Taki's arrest would affect Judgment's Western release. According to the NCD, Taki had been under investigation since 2018 following tips from unnamed sources and was asked to submit a urine sample.

After Taki's arrest, Ryu Ga Gotoku Studio producer Daisuke Sato tweeted that he would not allow Taki's arrest to interrupt the game's success or allow the actor's contribution to the game to be deleted. CyberConnect2 president Hiroshi Matsuyama criticized companies that stopped marketing their products due to the arrest of a person connected to their work. Sega later said that Taki's voice and likeness would be replaced, but the game's planned release date in the West on June 25, 2019, would remain unchanged. The character's new design was not based on any actor. Sega issued a new release in Japan on July 18, 2019, with Miō Tanaka replacing Taki in the role of Hamura.

A remastered version of the game was released for the PlayStation 5, Stadia, and Xbox Series X/S on April 23, 2021. The remaster features faster loading times, runs at 60 FPS, as well as all of the downloadable content from the original PlayStation 4 release. The game was also released for Amazon Luna on December 16, 2021. It was reported in July 2021 that a PC release of Judgment and its sequel would likely not happen due to Sega and Johnny & Associates (the talent agency which represents Kimura) being unable to come to an agreement concerning the use of Kimura's likeness in a PC release of the existing Judgment games or any future titles. However, both Judgment games were released on Steam on September 14, 2022, implying that this issue had been resolved.

== Reception ==
=== Critical response ===
Judgment reviews

Aggregate scores
Aggregator	Score
Metacritic	80/100
OpenCritic	89% recommend (Note: Based on 167 reviews)

Review scores
Publication	Score
Destructoid	7.5/10
Game Informer	8/10
GameSpot	7/10
GamesRadar+	3/5
Hardcore Gamer	4/5
HobbyConsolas	90/100
IGN	8.2/10
RPGamer	4.0/5
USgamer	4/5
VideoGamer.com	8/10

Judgment received "generally favourable" reviews, according to review aggregator Metacritic. Due to Kimura's popularity, Japanese fans have often nicknamed the game Kimutaku ga Gotoku (キムタクが如く; lit. "Like KimuTaku") with "Kimutaku" being short for Takuya Kimura, while "Gotoku" ("Like a") was a reference to the original Japanese title of the Yakuza franchise.

Although its gameplay was praised, critics had mixed opinions regarding its case-solving elements. Hobby Consolas praised the game for relying on multiple types of gameplay, giving it more variety. According to a VideoGamer.com reviewer, players attracted to the Yakuza series would enjoy Judgment because of its similarities in action. He noted that the fighting system was superior to Yakuza 6: The Song of Life and would attract fans, while the varied side missions gave players far more playing time. Although a Game Informer reviewer liked the action, they found the tailing missions frustrating and criticized the investigation areas for penalizing players who failed them. USgamer said that the tailing missions might drag, but the new chasing missions were more entertaining. Destructoid agreed with the USgamer review and said that the action scenes were not difficult. Tristan Ogilvie of IGN praised the game's combat system and diversified side content but criticized its shallow investigation mechanics, saying, "There's surprisingly little room given to make your own decisions." Edmond Tran of GameSpot described the game's tailing and chasing sections as "dull, slow and arduous", and called the investigation sections "incredibly straightforward". Nevertheless, he enjoyed the melee combat for the options it gives to the player. GamesRadar+ writer Bradley Russell criticized the core gameplay as "lacking in its execution" and over-relying on combat rather than investigation. On the other hand, Hardcore Gamer enjoyed the balance between the different styles of gameplay. RPGamer.com also praised the action elements but felt that the developers needed to fix the detective sections.

The plot was generally well received. Because it introduced a new cast instead of reusing characters, Game Informer found the story "refreshing" and described Yagami's investigations as intriguing. USgamer also praised the story for standing on its own and noted that despite Yagami's similarities to Kazuma Kiryu, Yagami had his own way of life. A Destructoid reviewer said that despite the game's similarity to Yakuza—namely its balance of seriousness and comedy—Judgment had a unique narrative, which they felt was on a par with Hollywood films. Russell praised the story, calling it "potentially one of the best in the medium". VideoGamer.com liked the game for using deep moral themes, which would entertain players for many hours. GameSpot praised the storyline, particularly Yagami and Kaito, calling them "genuinely likable characters". A HobbyConsolas reviewer noted that Sega added subtitles for languages other than English for the first time, making Judgment far more accessible, but Yagami was a less appealing character than Kiryu. Hardcore Gamer regarded the storyline as "the closest one can get to an entry point for those anxious about such an overbearing legacy that the Yakuza series presents" and appreciated that the Dragon Engine provided for facial expressions that were important for solving cases.

VideoGamer.com's reviewer liked the original Japanese cast's striking performances, despite the reviewer's initial preference for the English dub. The English voice actors' performances were praised; Ogilvie called the game's English voice acting "excellent" but noticed inconsistent English lip-syncing. EGM Now said Chun gave a more striking performance than Kimura, whom the writer did not find suitable for the character. RPGamer praised Sega's decision to add two languages to the audio, praising both Japanese and English versions equally.

A comparison between the PlayStation 5 version of the game (left) and the original

Several Giant Bomb reviewers listed Judgment as one of their favorite games of 2019, with Chris Tilton listing it at the top. USgamer included it in its list of the twenty best games of 2019. Push Square listed Judgment as the third-best Yakuza game based on its accessibility in terms of the narrative and complexity of the gameplay.

==== Remastered ====
Judgment Remastered reviews

Aggregate score
Aggregator	Score
Metacritic	PS5: 83/100; XSXS: 85/100; PC: 84/100

Review scores
Publication	Score
HobbyConsolas	90/100
Push Square	9/10
RPGFan	87/100
Gaming Age	A−
Windows Central	4/5

The remastered version of the game also received "generally favorable" reviews according to Metacritic. Both David Martínez from HobbyConsolas and Stan Yeung from Gaming Age found that the frame rate was stable even with a large enemy count, while the visuals remained polished. Windows Central stated that thanks to the superior frame rate, Yagami moves faster than previous Yakuza characters. The reviewer added that the graphics update might bother fans due to the new lighting, which changes colors to make the characters look more realistic. RPGFan praised the new style of the remaster's visuals, stating that the changes to the lighting "have given Kamurocho a bluer, cooler appearance, better fitting the noir feel of the game."

=== Awards ===
Year	Award	Category	Result	Ref
2019	PSLS Game of the Year 2019 Awards	Best Adventure Game 2019	Won	
2019	RPG Gamer Awards	Best Voice Acting	Won	
2019	Famitsu Awards	Excellence Prize	Won	
2019	Japan Game Awards	Award for Excellence	Won	
2019	2019 Golden Joystick Awards	PlayStation Game of the Year	Nominated	
2020	NAVGTR Awards	Original Light Mix Score, Franchise	Nominated	
2020	NAVGTR Awards	Performance in a Drama, Lead (Takuya Kimura)	Nominated	
2020	NAVGTR Awards	Performance in a Drama, Supporting (Pierre Taki)	Nominated	
2020	NAVGTR Awards	Song, Original or Adapted ("Arpeggio" by Alexandros)	Nominated	

=== Sales ===
Imported sales of Judgment rose in Japan when the game was withdrawn from Japanese store shelves; about 97 percent of its stock was sold and it reached number three on Amazon's sales rankings. Nagoshi stated that although the sudden interest in the game because of the controversy was disappointing, he was "glad in any case". Kazuki Hosokawa considered a Steam port to be possible in April 2019 but was unsure about this, as the team was still working on Yakuza ports. In 2019, Nagoshi said that while Sega claimed there was already work put into a sequel, it was a rumor. According to Media Create, the game had a strong opening in its first week in Japan with sales of 148,246 physical copies. It went on to sell 317,000 physical copies by 2020. Judgment was the most successful release for a new IP for the eighth generation of video game consoles in the country, although this record was later broken by Death Stranding. Producer Daisuke Sato said that Western sales of Judgment had exceeded expectations. Upon its release week, the PlayStation 5 version of the game sold 5,539 physical copies in Japan, while the original version sold 3,192 physical copies. It went to reach 14,479 physical copies for the PlayStation 5 while the original had 24,271. In June 2021, Sega announced that total sales topped one million units.

== Legacy ==
Rumors of a sequel were reported by publications in March 2021, hinting at the return of both Yagami and Kaito. That April, the official website announced a major tease related to Judgment on May 7, titled "Judgment Day". The official Twitter account of the game also revealed new footage of Yagami, hinting toward a sequel. On May 6, 2021, a day before Judgment Day, the sequel Lost Judgment was leaked by PlayStation Network in Japan. It released worldwide on September 24, 2021.
