= Sega Water Ski =

1997 video game

- The splash screen for Sega Water Ski
- Developer: Sega AM1
- Publisher: Sega
- Composer: Tetsuya Kawauchi
- Platform: Arcade
- Release: Arcade: JP: December 1997; NA: January 1998; EU: February 1998
- Mode: Single player
- Arcade system: Sega Model 2

Sega Water Ski is a foot controller-based simulation arcade game developed and released by Sega in 1997. The game was built on the Sega Model 2 hardware.

== Gameplay ==
Like Top Skater, the Sega Water Ski machines use a foot controller. The cabinet design was also similar to Top Skater. Players can move the foot control pads left and right to control direction, and perform jumps by lifting their heels. The gameplay focuses more on doing stunts on ramps under a time limit.

== Official soundtrack ==
A soundtrack containing music from this game and Motor Raid was released on January 21, 1998 by Marvelous Entertainment. T's Music assisted on the audio production.

== Reception ==
In Japan, Game Machine listed Sega Water Ski on their November 1, 1997 issue as being the seventh most-successful dedicated arcade game of the month.
