= Lost Judgment =

- Developer: Ryu Ga Gotoku Studio
- Publisher: Sega
- Director: Yutaka Ito
- Producer: Kazuki Hosokawa
- Designer: Natsuki Isaki
- Programmer: Tomoaki Nakamura
- Artist: Naoki Someya
- Writers: Tsuyoshi Furuta; Toshihiro Nagoshi; Hironao Fukuda (School Stories, Side Cases, and The Kaito Files only)
- Composers: Hidenori Shoji; Yuri Fukuda; Chihiro Aoki; Saori Yoshida; Satoshi Okamura; Keitaro Hanada; Takahiro Kai
- Series: Yakuza (Note: The Yakuza series was renamed to Like a Dragon internationally in September 2022, making Lost Judgement to be the last game in the franchise when it was under the Yakuza name.)
- Platforms: PlayStation 4; PlayStation 5; Xbox One; Xbox Series X/S; Windows
- Release: PS4, PS5, Xbox One, Xbox Series X/S; September 24, 2021; Luna; March 31, 2022; Windows; September 14, 2022
- Genre: Action-adventure
- Mode: Single-player

Lost Judgment (Note: Known in Japan as Lost Judgment: Sabakarezaru Kioku (Japanese: LOST JUDGMENT(ロストジャッジメント)：裁かれざる記憶; lit. Lost Judgment: Unjudged Memories)) is a 2021 action-adventure video game developed by Ryu Ga Gotoku Studio and published by Sega. It was released for PlayStation 4, PlayStation 5, Xbox One, and Xbox Series X/S on September 24, 2021, for Amazon Luna on March 31, 2022, and for Windows on September 14, 2022. A sequel to the 2018 game Judgment (a spin-off of the Yakuza series), Lost Judgment focuses on private detective Takayuki Yagami as he investigates a criminal accused of both sexual harassment and murder. Yagami manages to see the connection between the suspect Akihiro Ehara and his links with a series of murders committed against bullies in Kamurochō and Isezaki Ijincho. The game builds on the action sequences from the first game while revising its stealth elements. Yagami uses two returning fighting styles plus the new aikido-based Snake and, if the player buys a particular DLC, the Boxer style.

Major Japanese voice actors include the returning Takuya Kimura (Yagami) and the newcomers Hiroshi Tamaki (Soma) and Koji Yamamoto (Kuwana) whose characters rival Yagami as the writers wanted their stories to explore the subject of bullying and whether or not Yagami has the power to stop it.

Like its predecessor, the game received positive reviews from critics. The plot was generally praised for handling multiple controversial subjects in a serious manner though the pacing and style was the subject of mixed responses. Nevertheless, Yagami and the cast were well received. The gameplay was also praised, particularly the new improved fighting styles, but the stealth and parkour moves were often noted to be poorly developed. Downloadable content in the form of new sidequests and a story expansion focused on Yagami's partner Masaharu Kaito was also released.

== Gameplay ==
Yagami walks around the streets of Ijincho with a Shiba Inu named Ranpo. He can be called in to help Yagami find hidden items and clues.

In Lost Judgment, the player controls Takayuki Yagami as he explores the Japanese districts of Kamurochō in Tokyo and Isezaki Ijincho in Yokohama (recreations of the real-life Kabukichō and Isezakichō districts, respectively). In the base game, Yagami can switch between three fighting styles in battle. In addition to the crowd-control Crane style and the one-on-one Tiger style from Judgment, Yagami uses the newly added Snake style for counterattacking and disarming enemies. If the player buys the School Stories DLC pack, a fourth style, Boxing, can also be used.

As in the previous game, Lost Judgment also features stealth segments, platforming segments, and "tailing" missions where Yagami chases suspects around the city. The trailing sections of the game have been changed in order to give the players more activity in the segment. New to Lost Judgment is the "Detective Dog", a Shiba Inu named Ranpo whom Yagami can take on walks to find hidden items or track suspects via their scent. The game also features a "School Stories" system, where Seiryo High School's Mystery Research Club president Kyoko Amasawa requests Yagami investigate and assist other clubs and students in order to solve a greater mystery. Yagami can fulfill these requests by taking on side missions and playing various minigames. Some of these side missions include coaching the school's dance team through a rhythm minigame; building and controlling a robot in competitions for the robotics club; defeating a biker gang in a series of motorcycle races; and helping a troubled teenager overcome his violent tendencies through boxing training.

Similar to previous games, the player has access to emulations of classic Sega games. The in-game Club Sega arcades feature multiple playable arcade cabinets, including Space Harrier, Fantasy Zone, Super Hang-On, Fighting Vipers, Sonic the Fighters, Motor Raid, and Virtua Fighter 5: Final Showdown. Yagami can also play several Master System games in his office, including Alex Kidd in Miracle World; Fantasy Zone; Secret Command; Quartet; Enduro Racer; Penguin Land; Maze Hunter 3-D; Woody Pop; and Snail Maze.

Yagami's partner, Masaharu Kaito, also appears as a playable character via downloadable content. Kaito uses two different fighting styles: Bruiser, which focuses on offense and utilizes quick evasion; and Tank, which focuses on defense and environmental weapon usage. Sega has stated that Kaito's story campaign lasts roughly 10 hours.

== Synopsis ==
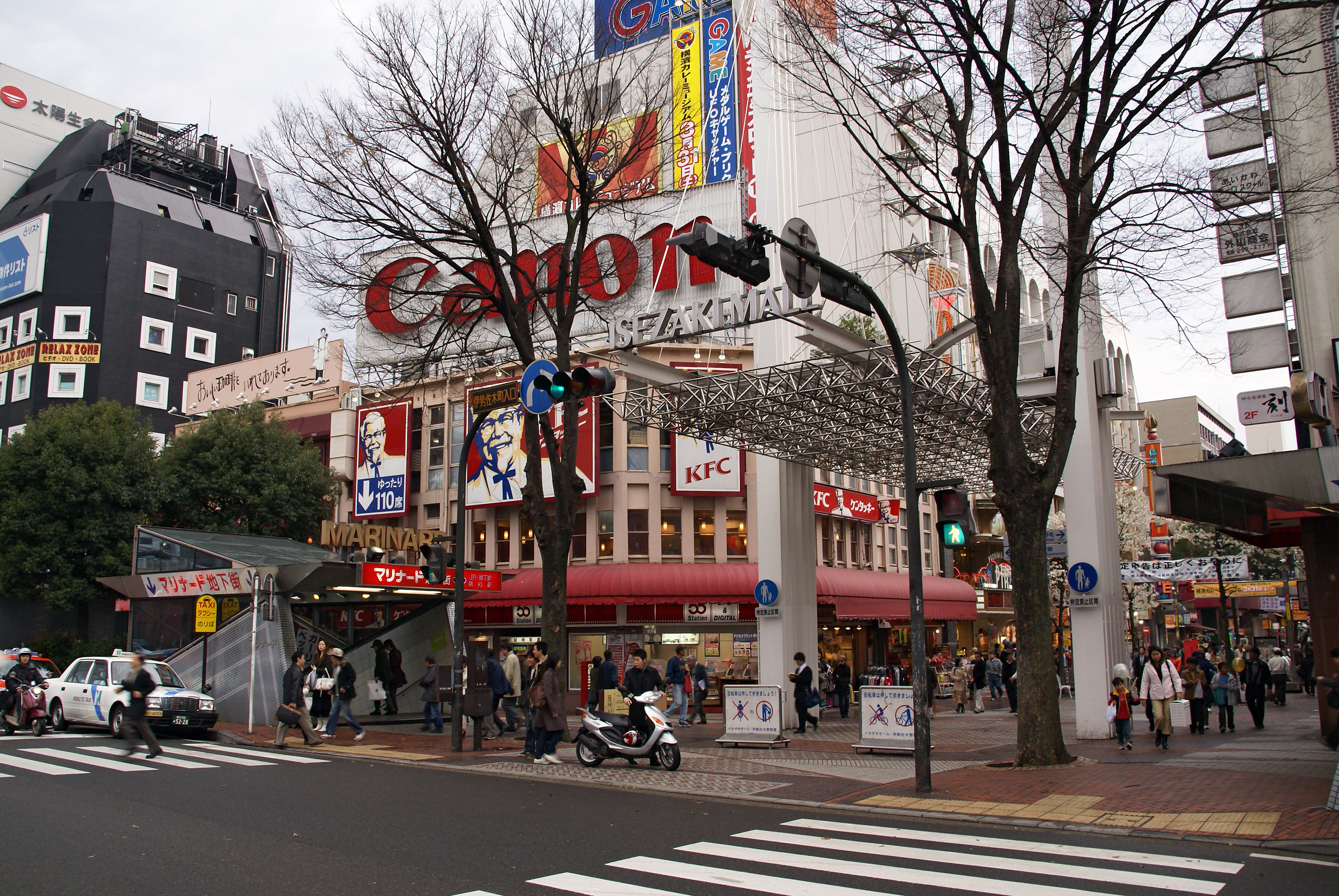
The Isezaki Ijincho district of Yokohama is based on Isezakichō.

=== Setting and characters ===
Lost Judgment is set in December 2021, three years after the events of Judgment. Private investigator Takayuki Yagami (Takuya Kimura/Greg Chun) returns as the primary protagonist, alongside several of his supporting cast: Masaharu Kaito (Shinshū Fuji/Crispin Freeman), Ryuzo Genda (Akira Nakao/Brian McNamara), Saori Shirosaki (Yūko Kaida/Stephanie Sheh), Issei Hoshino (Yū Hayashi/Joe Zieja), Mafuyu Fujii (Risa Shimizu/Cherami Leigh), Toru Higashi (Yoshihisa Kawahara/Steve Blum), Fumiya Sugiura (Junta Terashima/Mark Whitten), and Makoto Tsukumo (Jun Miyamoto/River Kanoff).

Yagami's investigation takes him across Kamurochō, Tokyo and Isezaki Ijincho, Yokohama, bringing him into contact with both new allies and enemies. The central figure of his investigation is Akihiro Ehara (Ken Mitsuishi/Artt Butler), a Tokyo Metropolitan Police Department Officer accused and held in custody for groping, while also linked to the murder of Hiro Mikoshiba (Shohei Kajikawa/Andrew Morgado), a student teacher at Seiryo High School. Opposing Yagami is Kazuki Soma (Hiroshi Tamaki/Matthew Yang King), the head of the "RK" (Red Knife) Hangure syndicate that has attempted to seize power in Kamurochō in the wake of the Tojo Clan and Omi Alliance disbanding, as depicted in Yakuza: Like a Dragon; Soma is supported by his right-hand man, Daimu Akutsu (Kenji Hamada/Brent Mukai). Aiding Yagami in his investigation is Jin Kuwana (Koji Yamamoto/Todd Haberkorn), a mysterious handyman with ties to the incident; Tesso (Jun Kasama/SungWon Cho), the leader of the Yokohama Liumang gang's White Mask branch; and Kisuke Watanabe (Shigeo Kiyama/Edward Bosco), a detective working for the Kanagawa Prefectural Police. As part of his investigation at Seiryo High School, Yagami also becomes acquainted with Mami Koda (Misuzu Togashi/Kayli Mills), a student who is targeted by several bullies in her class, and Yoko Sawa (Mai Yamane/Erica Lindbeck), an English teacher who oversees Koda's class and is connected to Ehara's son, Toshiro, who committed suicide several years ago. Other characters featured in the main story include: Yuzo Okuda (Yusaku Yara/Jamieson Price), the chairman of Seiryo High School; Reiko Kusumoto (Marika Hayashi/Sumalee Montano), the Vice Minister of Health who took the position following the arrest of her predecessor, Kaoru Ichinose; and Hidemi Bando (Yutaka Aoyama/Andrew Kishino), an officer of the National Police Agency's Public Security Division.

The Kaito Files expansion stars Kaito as the primary protagonist, and features a brand new cast of characters, including: Kyoya Sadamoto (Katsuyuki Konishi/Stephen Fu), a highly successful tech CEO; Mikiko Sadamoto (Eri Miyajima/Suzie Yeung), Kyoya's wife and Kaito's former lover who was thought to have committed suicide; Jun Sadamoto (Yuki Shin/Paul Castro Jr.), Kyoya and Mikiko's rebellious teenage son; Shusuke Kenmochi (Hiroshi Nakamura/Alexander Gross), leader of the Crimson Lotus gang; Masao Igarashi (Taichi Takeda/Peter Jessop) and Shiro Senda (Tōru Nara/Dave B. Mitchell), former yakuza members who now run the Bato Detective Agency as a rival to Yagami's business; and Yasutaka Shirakaba (Kenta Sasa/Yong Yea), a doctor residing in the Chiba Prefecture who has ties to Mikiko's disappearance.

=== Plot ===
Private detective Takayuki Yagami and his partner Masaharu Kaito are invited by their friends Fumiya Sugiura and Makoto Tsukumo to assist their fledgling detective business in Ijincho. They are requested by Seiryo High School Chairman Yuzo Okuda to covertly investigate claims of bullying as an open investigation would subject the school to stigmatization; one of his students, Toshiro Ehara, committed suicide four years prior after the school failed to find evidence that he was being bullied. Yagami discovers that the bullying exists and covertly intervenes on behalf of Mami Koda, a new bullying victim.

He later receives a call from his friend Saori Shirosaki at the Genda Law Office. Shirosaki explains that one of her defendants, Akihiro Ehara, who is held in custody for sexual battery, told the court about the whereabouts of Hiro Mikoshiba's body in Ijincho before the police could find it. He also accuses Mikoshiba of being a bully that drove Toshiro, his son, to suicide and blames the court and Seiryo High for letting Mikoshiba walk free. Shirosaki then requests Yagami's help in issuing an appeal for Ehara since she believes that he is using the sexual battery as an alibi for murdering Mikoshiba. Okuda overhears and reveals his motives for requesting the detectives; he seeks to disprove Ehara's accusations that Seiryo High is negligent in terms of bullying. Yagami infiltrates the school to further investigate Mikoshiba as he was a teacher at the time of his death. He asks Yoko Sawa, Mikoshiba's mentor, about his background but she refuses to cooperate.

It is then revealed that Sawa was pressured by the school to not implicate Mikoshiba for being responsible for Toshiro's suicide. Sawa was also a classmate of Mitsuru Kusumoto in 2008, who is currently in a coma after a suicide attempt, caused by bullying. Mitsuru's fate moved his homeroom teacher, Yu Kitakata, who is now a handyman under the alias Jin Kuwana, to blackmail Mitsuru's bullies into helping him commit murder against bullies across Japan; one of his victims was Mikoshiba. With this information, Yagami concludes that Ehara was assisted by Kuwana and his students in fabricating his alibi and murdering Mikoshiba. Kuwana is then hunted by the RK, a Hangure gang led by Kazuki Soma, who kills Sawa in an apparent crossfire.

Yagami discovers that the RK invasion was led by Hidemi Bando, coordinator of the National Police Agency's Public Security Division so that he could engage in a smear campaign against Reiko Kusumoto, Mitsuru's mother, who is also the Vice Minister of Health. Bando sought to remove Reiko as the supervisor of the national pension fund since he planned to gamble it to revive Japan's stagnant economy. To resolve this, he decided to expose her secret of murdering Shinya Kawai, one of Mitsuru's bullies; he intended to capture Kuwana and his students so that he could make them testify against her. The RK is also revealed to be a front; Soma was one of Bando's agents but decided not to defame Reiko as he admired her leadership skills. As a result, he killed Sawa since she knew about Kuwana's murders, inevitably implicating Kusumoto.

Bando later relents and convinces Kusumoto that he can hide her secret. Kusumoto refuses upon realizing that this was what caused Sawa, who always supported Mitsuru, to die. Before she can proceed, Mitsuru wakes up, with Bando successfully convincing Kusumoto to follow along his plans after claiming that Mitsuru would be hurt by his mother going to jail. Bando then orders the RK to kill everyone who could implicate Kusumoto, including Yagami. Kuwana negotiates and offers the RK the whereabouts of Kawai's body. Yagami and his allies prevent the RK, including Soma, from destroying Kawai's body. Kuwana, however, also refuses to destroy the body with Yagami defeating him as well. By the new year, Bando and Soma are arrested, Ehara and Kusumoto confess their murders which Mitsuru accepts, Yagami's actions inspire Koda's bullies to reform and prevent other bullying incidents and Kuwana anonymously tips the police about his other murders since he feels guilty for inadvertently causing Sawa's death.

==== The Kaito Files ====
A month after the incident with Ehara, while Yagami is out of town on a job, Kaito is contacted by tech CEO Kyoya Sadamoto. Sadamoto asks Kaito to find his wife Mikiko, who allegedly committed suicide two years prior but was recently spotted in Kamurochō. As Mikiko was his ex-girlfriend, Kaito feels emotionally compromised and declines the case. Later, Kaito encounters Sadamoto's son Jun, who believes the circumstances around Mikiko's death were falsified and that she is alive. When Jun claims that Kaito is his biological father, he finally agrees to take the case. While searching, Jun is kidnapped by the corrupt Bato Detective Agency, but is ultimately rescued by Kaito.

During their investigation, Kaito and Jun learn that a man was asking around Kamurochō about Mikiko a few months after her death. Traveling to his home in Chiba, they meet Yasutaka Shirakaba, a doctor who admits to faking Mikiko's death to protect her from a gang that was looking for her. Shirakaba explains that he found Mikiko suffering from dissociative amnesia after falling from a waterfall, and has been caring for her in secret for the last two years. However, Mikiko recently disappeared after her memories finally resurfaced. The three are then confronted by Crimson Lotus, a gang from Shinjuku led by Shusuke Kenmochi whom Shirakaba identifies as the ones who were looking for Mikiko. The gang demands they hand Mikiko over, claiming she is responsible for killing several of their members, but Kaito and the others manage to escape.

In Kamurochō, Kaito finds Mikiko confronting another Crimson Lotus member, learning that Crimson Lotus killed her family and had attempted to murder her and frame it as a suicide, but is unable to catch her. He tails Kenmochi, expecting Mikiko to do the same, but this proves to be a trap for both of them by Crimson Lotus. Kaito rescues Mikiko, who reveals that she has not yet killed anyone, as someone has consistently reached and murdered each of her intended victims first. She also reveals that she hired the Bato Detective Agency to help her, including protecting Jun, who she confirms is not Kaito's son. Mikiko then escapes, intending to finish off Crimson Lotus, and Kaito and the Bato detectives pursue her to Ijincho, where the remaining Crimson Lotus members are having a reunion.

Kaito reaches the roof of the party and finds Mikiko confronting Sadamoto, the mastermind behind everything. Sadamoto reveals that he married Mikiko and killed her family to gain their fortune, that he ordered Mikiko's death two years ago when she found out the truth, and that he was the leader of the group that became Crimson Lotus. He has been killing the other members to cover up his ties to the organization, including poisoning everyone at the reunion, and intends to frame Mikiko for their deaths. Sadamoto tries to hold Jun hostage, but Jun escapes after being inspired by Kaito, who subdues Sadamoto. Mikiko attempts to kill Sadamoto, but Kaito stops her, reminding her that Jun still needs her. Kenmochi, still guilt-ridden over killing Mikiko's family, kills Sadamoto before succumbing to the poison. In the aftermath, Shirakaba demands Kaito duel him for Mikiko's affection; Kaito wins, and he and Mikiko decide to rekindle their relationship.

== Development ==
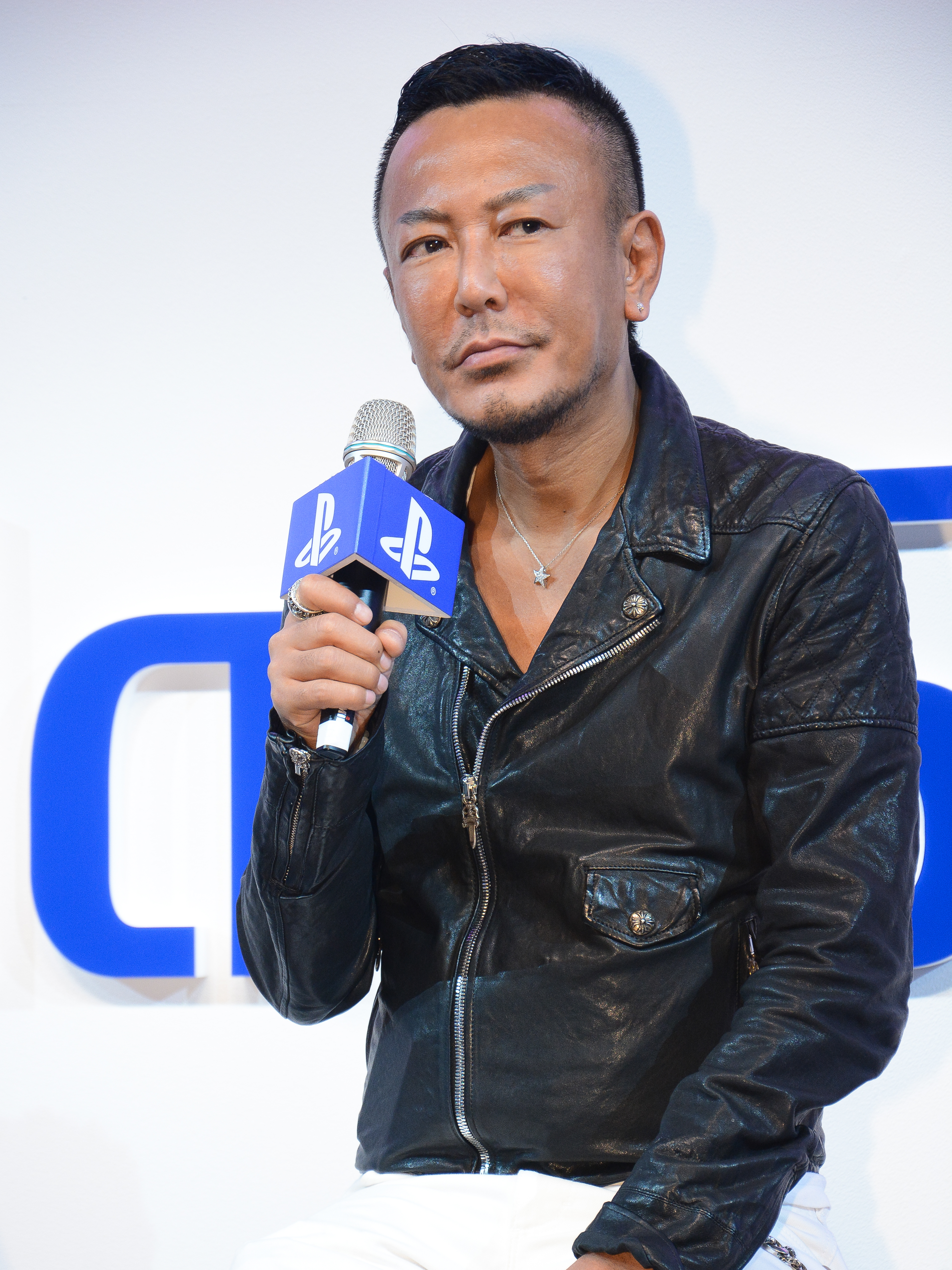
Writer and executive director Toshihiro Nagoshi

Lost Judgment faced unique challenges, according to Kazuki Hosokawa. He claimed "About a year ago when we were in the initial phase of development there was no lockdown in Japan, and the situation wasn’t as severe, but once we entered the final stages of production, things were getting serious and it became harder to communicate. There was a loss of speed and we wished we were able to discuss things faster. If we were in person, we would have been able to do that, so it was definitely a cause for stress." As a result, Hosokawa claimed that he wanted the staff to be comfortable in the making of it. They aimed to properly balance the different types of gameplay: fight, puzzles trailing, and disguises. One thing that did change was with how he communicated with the development staff: Many continued to see Ito as a programmer due to his previous role, and so he had to actively ask them to also ask him about planning and design elements and not just programming issues. Hosokawa said that one thing he found interesting was how directors who come from a specific team tend to not hold back against their former team. Hosokawa is a designer, and when he became a director he went tough on the design team. Likewise, Ito gave no quarter to the programming team upon becoming director. Hosokawa aimed both Judgment to be seen as unique when compared. The programmers in charge redid several elements them. As a result, the characters feel more realistic, with the tailing targets now breaking out into jogs, turning back when they hear sounds, and he hopes that players notice this.

Ito also said that by becoming the director, he found out that each section of the team kept trying to reduce work for the other sections. Ito said that they spent a lot of time and effort on the tailing sequences at the start of the first chapter. The tailing sequences in the previous game were divisive, and they received a lot of feedback from players outside of Japan who said they wanted to hurry up and get to the fights. As such, they put effort into showing how tense and fun the tailing is, test playing it several times. They spent an entire year working on it.

The game was designed in this way to allow players to immerse themselves in the drama while ensuring a certain degree of freedom. They have balanced the game in a way that all players can enjoy the thrilling experience stress-free. The game uses original Dragon Engine, but the texture of the screen is more realistic than that of the Like a Dragon series, with a touch of film-like feel. Sega thinks this effect is more apparent in the suspenseful scenes. They developed this technique by working on the Like a Dragon series for so long, and Lost Judgment has benefited from that. For a better resolution, Nagoshi recommended playing the new generation consoles. A new fighting style known as Snake was added. It was based on Aikido with Nagoshi commenting it served as a merciful style.

Although Judgment was a spin-off to the action series Like a Dragon which became a turn-based RPG with Yakuza: Like a Dragon, executive director Toshihiro Nagoshi and producer Kazuki Hosokawa claimed that Judgment would stay true to the action system originally developed for Like a Dragon. The open world from Yokohama features a high school which was based on real life. Nagoshi claimed Lost Judgment was made thanks to the positive responses towards Judgment and thus aimed to improve the system based on the feedback. The games was set to be released on September 24, 2021, worldwide. On May 27, it was announced by Sega that the 1996 arcade game Sonic the Fighters would be playable in the game's arcades, in celebration of 2021 being the Sonic the Hedgehog franchise's 30th Anniversary. Despite Judgment and Like a Dragon taking place in the same universe, there will be no crossovers as a result of the two being different IPs despite similarities.

On July 6, Lost Judgment's intro cinematic was revealed, featuring the game's theme song "Rasen", by Jon-Yakitory featuring Ado. Jon-Yakitory produced the theme after multiple talks with Nagoshi. Ado enjoyed working alongside Jon-Yakitory and looked forward to how it will be executed in the game.

=== Scenario ===
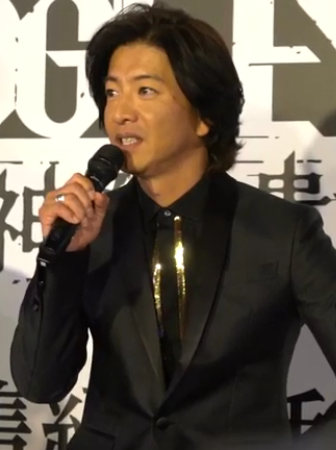
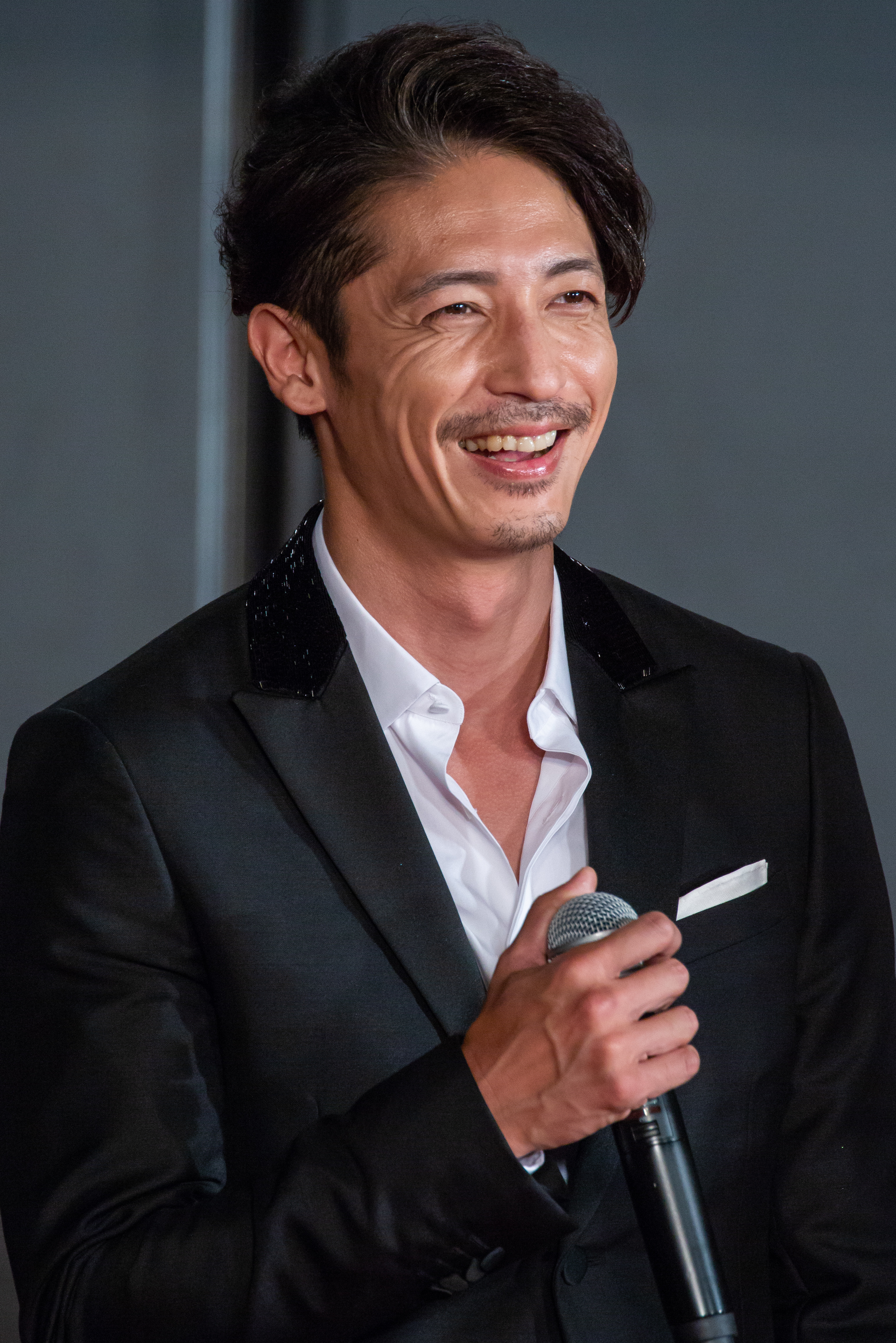
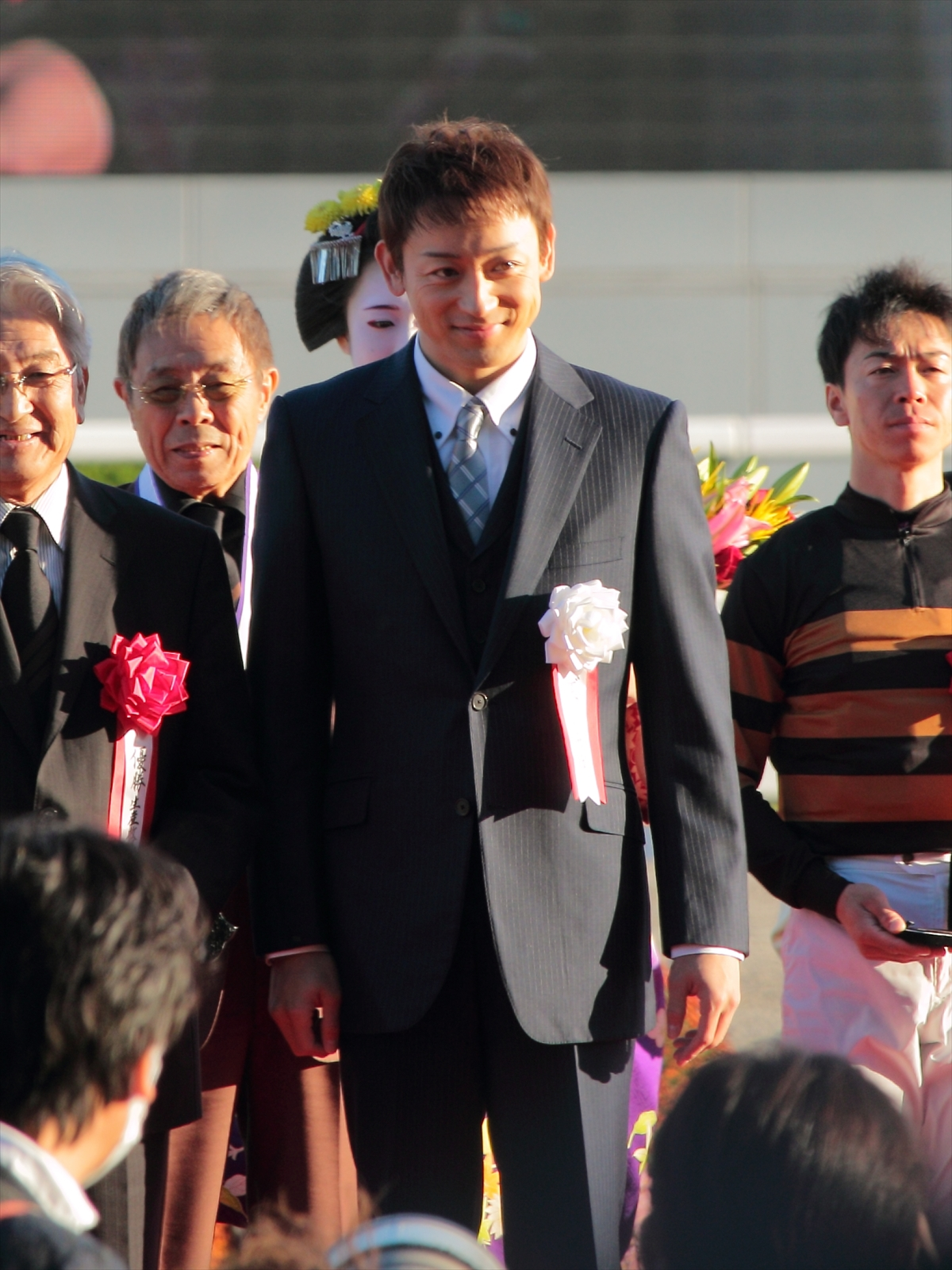
Major Japanese voice actors include the returning Takuya Kimura (Yagami) and the newcomers Hiroshi Tamaki (Soma) and Koji Yamamoto (Kuwana).

Although Judgment was originally titled Judge Eyes in Japan and Asia, Sega liked the naming for the Western version, resulting into "Judgment" being part of the sequel's title even in Eastern territories. The plot was written to be realistic, something the staff found challenging while providing themes seen as sensitive to the audience like bullying as well as what should people call justice, with the latter being explored through Yagami's characterization. The youth drama is meant to balance the dark storytelling based on how Yagami interacts with teenagers. As the previous game's story was well-received, by the audience, Sega once again attempted a new story that would appeal to the audience. While Hosokawa cannot give an exact timeframe, he does say that work on the story began even before the development team was put together. Writer Furuta first came up with the outline of the story, and then he worked with Nagoshi to add the finer details. It was only after it was done to some degree that the planning team and director joined the project, and started considering how to turn the story into a game.

The cast features multiple returning and new characters. According to Yagami's Japanese actor Takuya Kimura, the story is "deep and suspenseful" but also features lighter scenes like the School Stories. Hosokawa claimed that the school interactions reveal a "unique side" of Yagami's character. Hiroshi Tamaki focused on realism when recording, comparing the entire game with a film. His first work in video game, the actor found it as an "out-of-body" experience. He described Soma as looking like "aloof" and "clearly perceptive" but hides a true persona he wanted the fans to look forward in the game. Ken Mitsuishi recalls Judgment was popular within the acting world so he felt engaged when being offered the role of Akihiro Ehara. He did not find troubles understanding his character especially thanks to the motion capture. As a result, of the two crimes that Ehara claiming he committed, Mitsuishi said that his character was given a mysterious air. Koji Yamamoto who plays the new Jin Kuwana said he was fascinated by the work, especially since it was his debut in a video game. He was surprised by Kuwana and the narrative due to how Kuwana's role changes. Akira Nakao reprises his role of Ryuzo Genda who often mentors Yagami. The actor noted that he became highly popular thanks to Judgment especially within the young demographic.

Hosokawa said the team read books from authors like Keigo Higashino and Hideo Yokoyama when preparing to write the game with the former's novel The Devotion of Suspect X being a major influence. The narrative focuses primarily on bullying as they consider it as a "Distorted justice" which clashes with Yagami's morals. Strichart commented that Yagami is not a hero so he is not able to solve all these cases on his which contrast the fantasy style Persona 5 which often deals with the protagonists saving victims using their powers. During Lost Judgment Yagami meets Kuwana who instead tries to solve every attempt of bullying regardless of methods. In contrast to Judgment, the sequel does not end on satisfactory note for Yagami as Kuwana manages to escape from the protagonist. Nevertheless, Yagami demonstrates a major influence on the bullies he meets in the game's beginning to the point they become heroic figures during the climax.

=== Localization ===
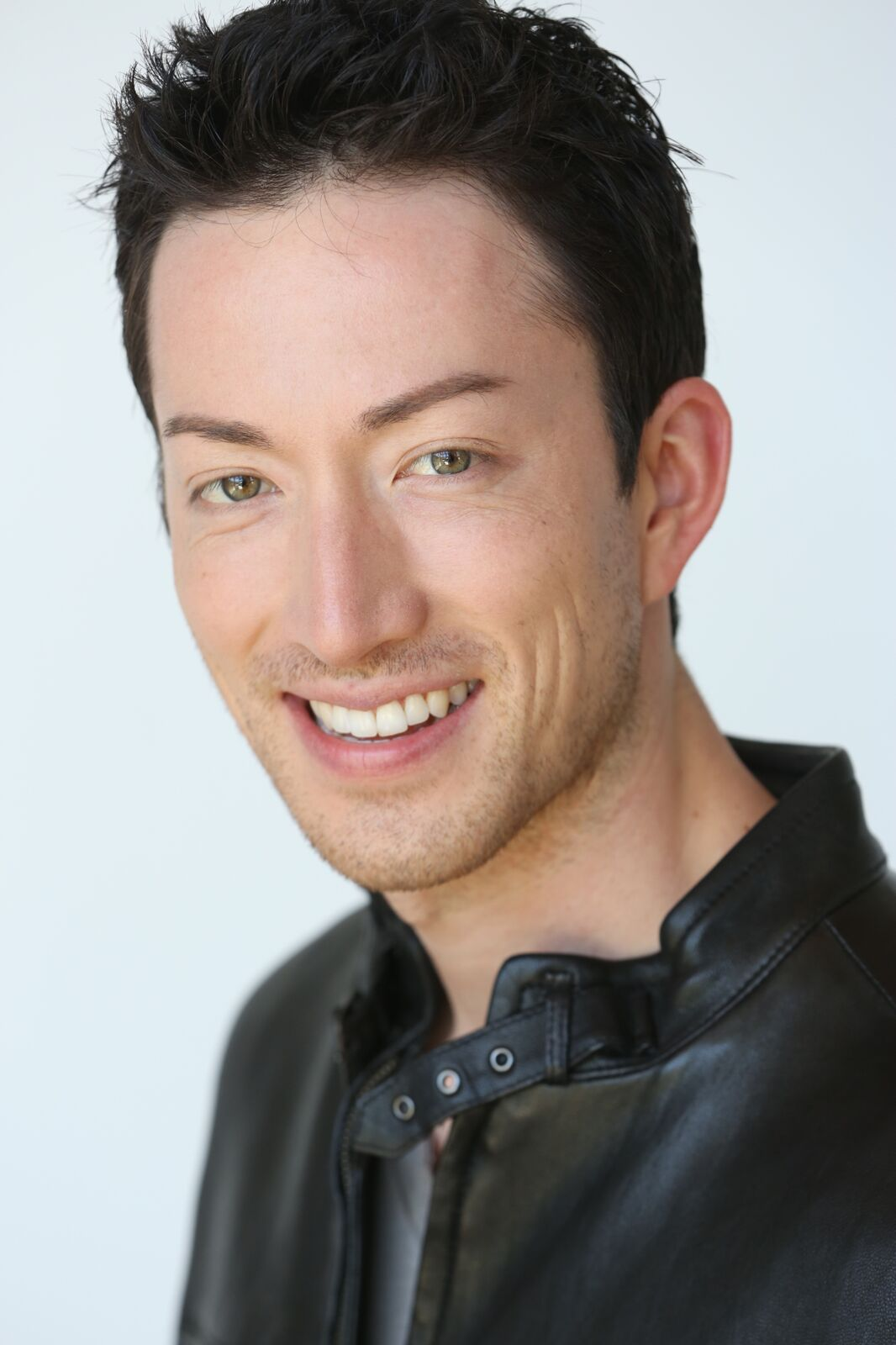
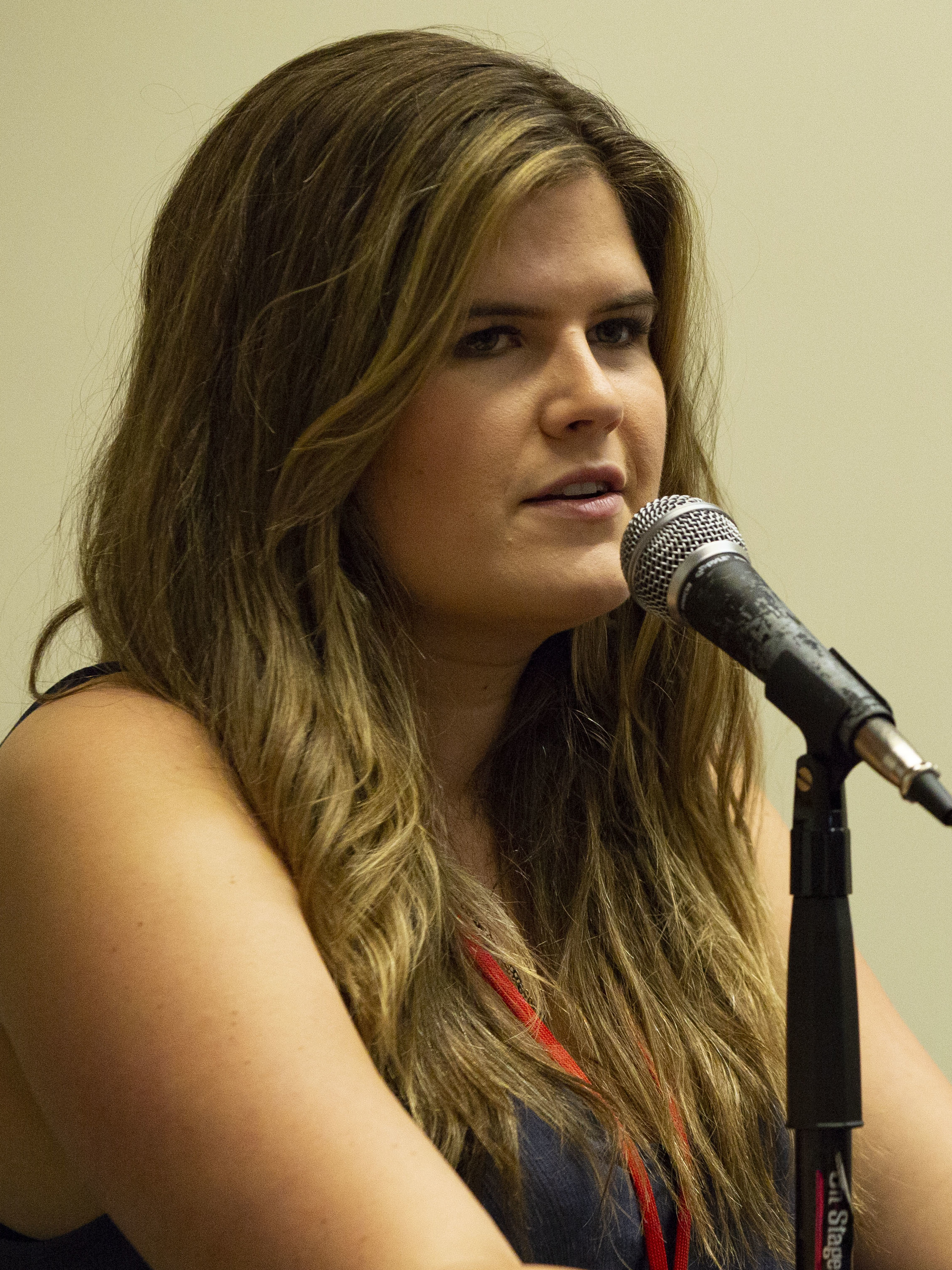
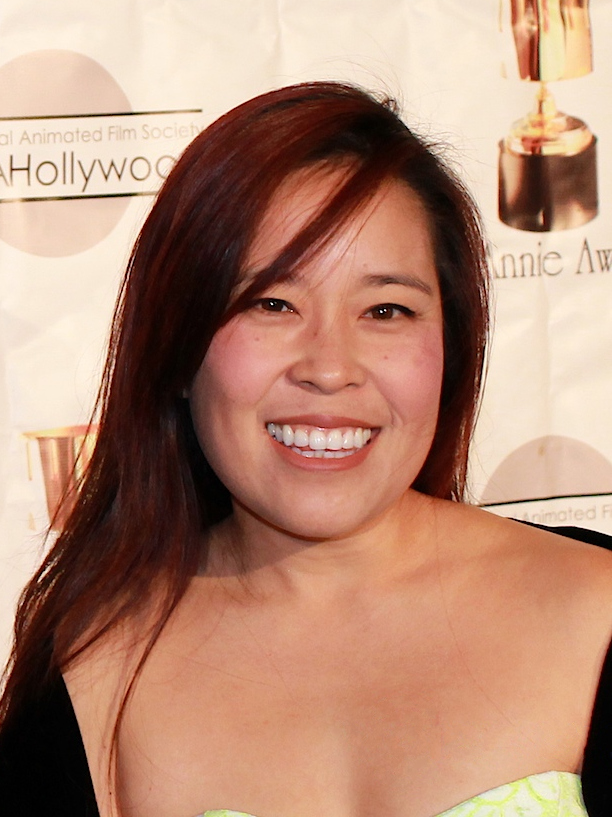
The new English voice cast from Lost Judgment includes Todd Haberkorn (Kuwana), Erica Lindbeck (Sawa), and Stephanie Sheh (Shirosaki).

The English recording studio was made in PCB Productions owned by Keith Arem with major aid by Vicky Lee. The translation was done by Jyun Takagi, shored up with support from Shun Fukuda and Mino Iwasaki. Josh Malone, who worked on Yakuza: Like a Dragon and Shinada in the Yakuza remasters, stepped up in a big way to help handle voice over. He was supported by Shervin Zadeh, Shaun Gannon, and Stephanie Spoleti, who was also a Yakuza vet.

Localization producer Scott Strichart said that Lost Judgment might be one of the most challenging works he has done due to the multiple requirements, including the dual audio and English subtitles, the multiple subtitles and the game being released for four consoles. Nevertheless, he believes he has already produced similar content ever since Yakuza 0. Multiple words have to work in multiple situations, which Stritchart considered localization challenge. There is also the "chatter posts" in the buzz researcher that use variables for the keywords players are searching. Strichart considered this one of the most challenging parts of the making of the game's localization. Having felt nostalgia from the years he localized the heavily school themed game Persona 4, Strichart claims that the narrative involves multiple dark elements involving students involving bullying or suicide. Although Judgment is not a popular game, Strichart finds challenging releasing the game at the same time as the director's cut of Death Stranding, a game by the famous Hideo Kojima.

Lost Judgment was the ultimate pinnacle of challenge, just turning around that game in essentially a year with the amount of audio and languages that we had to do.

It takes its toll. Under the weight of that, you're looking at it almost like, "Okay, next time, we need to not do it this way, but for this time, let's just get it done."

— Scott Strichart

For the English version, many of the cast members from the first installment returned, but Strichart said some were replaced for logistical reasons. Greg Chun noted that the predecessor helped to properly develop Yagami to the point he seemed like another person when quitting his lawyer occupation as he took a liking to being a humble detective; this was mostly seen through the scene where Yagami tells Kaito that they should search for a lady's cat as part of their job in a pleased manner, something the localization team enjoyed recording. As a result, he claimed that for the sequel "the game kind of teed me up to really be in that Yagami mindset where, yeah, I love being a detective, but some cases are real bummer and super boring." However, in regards to the narrative, he claimed that he had to keep "living the character" due to new elements being provided. He believed that Lost Judgment explores more of Yagami's anger, something the first game did not focus on.

Aside from Chun reprising his role as Yagami, returning cast members include Crispin Freeman as Masaharu Kaito, Brain McNamara as Ryuzo Genda, Mark Whitten as Fumiya Sugiura, River Vitae as Makoto Tsukumo, Joe Zieja as Issei Hoshino, Steve Blum as Toru Higashi, and Cherami Leigh as Mafuyu Fujii. New English cast members include Artt Butler as Akihiro Ehara, Brent Mukai as Daimu Akutsu, Todd Haberkorn as Jin Kuwana, Erica Lindbeck as Yoko Sawa, Kayli Mills as Mami Koda, Xanthe Huynh as Kyoko Amasawa, Edward Bosco as Kisuke Watanabe, and Aleks Le as Shinya Kawai. Returning actors such as Matthew Yang King, Jamieson Price, Yuri Lowenthal, SungWon Cho, and Keith Silverstein voice new characters entirely, being Kazuki Soma, Yuzo Okuda, Sadao Takano, Tesso, and the Owner of Bar Siren respectively. Aimee Castle does not return to voice Saori Shirosaki in the sequel, and is replaced by Stephanie Sheh.

=== Promotion and release ===
Following the release of the game, Sega staff felt that if there should be a sequel to Judgment, Yagami and his partner Masaharu Kaito would retain their lead roles and would still be set in Kamurocho. Rumors of a sequel were reported by publications in March 2021, hinting at the return of both Takayuki Yagami and Kaito. In April of the same year, the official website announced a major tease related to Judgment on May 7, titled "Judgment Day". The official Twitter account of the game also revealed new footage of Yagami, hinting at the sequel. On May 6, 2021, a day before "Judgment Day", an entry for Lost Judgment was leaked by PlayStation Network in Japan, which stated the Digital Deluxe edition would be released September 21. The game was officially announced on May 7, 2021, for PlayStation 4, PlayStation 5, Xbox One, and Xbox Series X/S. The team listened to fan feedback in regards to what elements from the gameplay needed to be improved. A demo was released to the PlayStation Store on September 10.

Three downloadable content packs were developed for the game. The first is the "Detective Essentials Pack", which was released at launch. The pack adds twelve additional side missions, three new girlfriends for Yagami to date, and an additional superboss battle for the game's "Gauntlet" challenge mode. The pack also grants the player several bonus items, including three alternate color skins for the Detective Dog, an additional drone frame, six new extract recipes, a hoverboard with three additional skateboarding challenges, and four additional Master System games (Sagaia; Fantasy Zone II: The Tears of Opa-Opa; Alien Syndrome; and Global Defense). The second DLC is the "School Stories Expansion Pack", which was released on October 12. It includes additional items for the School Stories minigames, three additional sparring partners for the boxing minigame, and a fourth fighting style for Yagami, based around boxing. The third DLC titled "The Kaito Files" was released on March 28, 2022, and includes a new story campaign featuring Masaharu Kaito as a playable character. On consoles, all three pieces of content are available individually or as part of a season pass; excluding The Kaito Files, all DLC is included with the Windows version. Work on the DLC was still continuing in August 2021, as production on "The Kaito Files" did not begin until the main game was completed.

It was reported in July 2021 that Lost Judgment could be the last game in the series, due to Sega and Johnny & Associates (the talent agency which represents Kimura) being unable to come to an agreement concerning the use of Kimura's likeness in a PC release of the existing Judgment games or any future titles. However, both Judgment games were released on Steam on September 14, 2022, implying that this issue had been resolved.

== Reception ==
Reception

Aggregate scores
Aggregator	Score
Metacritic	PS4: 83/100; PS5: 82/100; XSXS: 80/100; PC: 84/100
OpenCritic	88% recommend (Note: Based on 133 reviews)

Review scores
Publication	Score
Destructoid	8/10
Easy Allies	8.0/10
Game Informer	7.25/10
GameRevolution	9/10
GameSpot	7/10
GamesRadar+	4/5
Hardcore Gamer	4.5
IGN	7/10
Push Square	8/10
RPGamer	3.5/5
RPGFan	PS5: 93/100; PC: 73/100
Shacknews	7/10
Video Games Chronicle	4/5
Collider	A−

Lost Judgment received "generally favorable" reviews, according to review aggregator Metacritic. Critics commented on the narrative and Yagami's role in Lost Judgment. He was praised by Destructoid for revealing new parts of his personality that are developed in the narrative. The various sidequests were praised for balancing the game's narrative in delivering both light and dark stories. GameSpot felt that the sequel had Yagami struggle with the themes of whether or not the lead is able to deal justice by himself. Additionally, the subplot of Yagami working in a school attracted a positive response by the same publication due to how fun it becomes. Although he does not team up with Kaito many times in the sequel, GameSpot felt that Yagami became a more likable character in the sequel and is able to deliver emotional scenes properly. The reviewer further praised the handling of the narrative as it focuses properly on several conflicting themes, like issues with the law, bullying and sexual harassment. Both Game Informer and GamesRadar+ agreed but felt that the adult themes addressed in the game might bother sensitive audiences, as they can be seen to include more social commentary than previous games. However, Game Informer felt that the sexual harassment substory from the game was the worst substory, despite being generally a moving story. IGN criticized how Lost Judgment establishes the entirety of the plot's idea in early chapters, making it look disappointing in retrospect as there are no major or interesting plot twists in the second half of the game. Shacknews enjoyed the improved visuals but felt the main plot was a "mess" due to how difficult is to understand, with Ehara's case being focussed on for several chapters, which makes the pacing poorly handled.

With regard to the gameplay, IGN enjoyed the use of action style, as Yakuza: Like a Dragon replaced the series' famous beat 'em up style with turn-based role playing, and felt that Yagami is more enjoyable to play than in the previous game. While praising Yagami's fighting styles and its aikido-based new style, GameSpot felt that there were no major additions to the sequel and the new stealth mechanics are too linear. Destructoid thoroughly enjoyed Yagami's improved moves as the cinematic techniques or weapons are visually more appealing, and appreciated how simple they are for players to use. The loading times were also noted to have been reduced, especially on the PlayStation 5 version. The large number of sidequests and arcade games like Sonic the Fighters gave the reviewer cause to recommend the game not only to Yakuza gamers but also Shenmue gamers. While finding it enjoyable, GamesRadar+ commented that the game lacked innovation compared to Judgment despite representing an improvement over the Yakuza games' fighting styles. Nevertheless, IGN still felt the sidequests were too tedious due to how difficult it is to unlock them and their various narratives. Shacknews criticized the stealth quests for being too simple while some sidequests were noted to drag the experience. Eurogamer outlined in their review that "RGG Studio's broadest, most packed open world is matched by mediocre additions and an ill-fitting story." Game Informer felt that the sidequests were a good a balance to the dark narrative, but felt the parkour and stealth were poorly implemented.

GameSpot and Collider praised the presentation in terms of graphics, character renders and the two districts Yagami can visit. The latter also praised both Japanese and English voice actors for giving good delivery, though the lypsincing was more appropriate in Japanese, unless a cutscene was being played. Shacknews also noted that the voice actors, most notably Yagami's Takuya Kimura and Greg Chun, gave appealing performances, most notably when playing serious scenes. Besides enjoying Yagami's actors, Metro also felt that Kaito and Soma's actors delivered strong performance regardless of language.

RPG Site listed it as one of the best 2021 video games. The game was also nominated for the category "Xbox Game of the Year". In the 2022 "Famitsu Dengeki Game Awards", the game was won "Best Scenario Award" as well as "Best Actor Award" for Kimura's performance as Yagami.

Upon its release week, the PlayStation 4 version of the game topped Famitsu's list of best-selling games with 111,852 copies while the PlayStation 5 game sold 33,151 units. In the United Kingdom' sales, the game reached fourth place with most of its sold copies being the PlayStation 5 version.

=== The Kaito Files ===
Reception

Aggregate scores
Aggregator	Score
Metacritic	PS5: 76/100; XSXS: 78/100
OpenCritic	72% recommend (Note: Based on 19 reviews)

Review scores
Publication	Score
Push Square	8/10
The Games Machine (Italy)	7.7/10

The Kaito Files also received "generally favorable" reviews according to Metacritic. RPG Site enjoyed the narrative, mostly praising the handling of Kaito as a protagonist. The Mako Reactor also found it accessible as a result of not referencing previous events from the story and found the content more enjoyable than Goro Majima's sidestory from Yakuza Kiwami 2 which gave a major role to this character. Crispin Freeman and Suzie Yeung's performances were also the subject of praise. Siliconera referred to the story as enjoyable even if it comes across as predictable.

While the gameplay was found to be enjoyable for giving the player different fighting styles from Yagami's in the main game, it was still criticized for being noticeably smaller despite the price. The boss fights were still well received, as were the visuals employed whenever the character is fighting. Siliconera was more critical of the gameplay for lacking new gameplay elements compared with the original Lost Judgment, as Kaito uses the same deductive skills as Yagami, in contrast to the hand-to-hand combat which comes across as more original.
