= Motor Raid =

1997 video game

- Developer: AM1
- Publisher: Sega
- Designer: SEGA AM R&D Dept.-1 Developers
- Composer: Makito Nomiya
- Platform: Arcade
- Release: WW: October 1997
- Genre: Racing
- Mode: Up to 4 players simultaneously
- Arcade system: Sega Model 2

Motor Raid (モーターレイド) is a racing video game released by Sega on its Model 2A arcade system board in 1997. In contrast to the realistic style of most of Sega's previous racing games, Motor Raid uses a futuristic aesthetic and gameplay supplemented by fighting elements.

The game was released in single and two-player cabinets, which may be linked together to support up to four players. Both are sit-down cabinets with model motorcycles, and were sold as an update kit for Manx TT Superbike. Game modes include "Championship" and "Practice" and there are four playable characters, Geila, Gunz, Io and Robin.

Unlike other Model 2A racers like Manx TT Superbike and the original Sega Rally Championship, Motor Raid was not ported to the contemporary Sega Saturn or Windows 95. In 2018, it was made playable on consoles for the first time via an in-game arcade machine in the Yakuza spin-off Judgment and its 2021 sequel Lost Judgment.

== Gameplay ==
As with most motorcycle arcade games, acceleration is performed by twisting the handle, steering is accomplished through leaning the bike's body left or right, and braking is done by squeezing a lever. As the race progresses, a three-layer turbo gauge fills automatically and the player can choose among three types of boosts: a short blue boost that is ready when the boost gauge fills to 100%, a stronger green boost that requires the boost gauge to fill up to 200%, and an extremely powerful orange boost that can only be unleashed when the boost gauge fills to the maximum level of 300%, and will allow the character to knock out opponents. Boosts are activated by waiting for the gauge to fill up and twisting the acceleration handle twice whenever the desired boost type is available.

Players can engage in close quarters combat in an effort to seize or maintain first place. The primary combat move is to swing a powerful weapon (such as a crescent sword or a "smash-nail" pike) around to knock down and slow opponents. The player can also hold down the button to sacrificially throw the weapon at an opponent in an effort to take their weapon as a replacement, but if the player misses or gets attacked too many times, the weapon is lost. In such a situation, the player can throw a punch or use a permanent secondary weapon, such as a claw or whip, for a chance to steal a weapon from a nearby opponent. Players can kick to hold off opponents that approach from behind, but kicks do not result in knockouts.

Players are given a limited amount of time to finish a race, which can be partially replenished by passing through checkpoints. If the timer reaches zero, the game ends. Finishing a race at a good position may award the player a few extra seconds of time for the next race.

Upon beginning a game session, the player is prompted to choose between four characters and whether to compete in the "Championship" (where a single player races on three planets for the top prize), race in "Battle" mode (where up to four players compete on one of five planets), or do a "Practice" run on any course. A sixth planet, Segal, is playable if a cheat code is entered. The player begins each race with the character's primary weapon, secondary weapon, and a 100% full turbo gauge.

In the "Championship" mode, the player does a two-lap race on the first planet, Yendas, and a one-lap race in two other planets. Which planet the next race takes place on depends mostly on whether or not the player finishes in first place. If the player finishes first in all three races, they will go to the planet Segal for an extra race. If the player finishes first in every race, more about the chosen character is revealed in a bonus ending.

== Stages ==
There are five playable planets in this game (plus a sixth, secret one), each with their own unique terrain:

- Yendas: A desert-like planet where the track is typically a loop. The Championship race here lasts three laps, unlike all other planets where the race lasts two laps. If played in Practice mode, the race lasts four laps.
- Ido: A mountainous planet with curves, hills and dips.
- Reef 8: An Earth-like planet, although it is mostly oceanic.
- Junos: A cold, snowy planet.
- Bowel: A hot, volcanic planet with several twists and turns.
- Segal: A futuristic city-planet at night, where only the best of the best Motor Raiders have the right to compete for racing supremacy across the galaxy. Crowds of people can be seen in parts of the track, and a large floating camera drone captures the race action live. Being that it is a secret, extra track, it is a fairly difficult one. It is also named after SEGA, and contains a large Sonic the Hedgehog statue wagging his finger.

In "Championship" mode, there are three stages (excluding the Extra Stage at Segal), and the first stage is always held at Yendas. Finishing the race in first place changes the next stage to a more difficult one than if 2nd or lower place is achieved. The races are as follows:

Yendas → Junos (if placed 1st in Yendas) → Bowel (if placed 1st in Junos) → Segal (Extra Stage, if placed 1st in Bowel, else the game ends)

Yendas → Junos (if placed 1st in Yendas) → Reef8 (if placed 2nd or lower in Junos)

Yendas → Junos (if placed 1st in Yendas) → Ido (if placed 4th or lower in Junos)

Yendas → Ido (if placed 2nd or lower in Yendas) → Junos (if placed 1st in Ido)

Yendas → Ido (if placed 2nd or lower in Yendas) → Reef8 (if placed 2nd or lower in Ido)

Segal is also playable from the start with a cheat code. To do that, the players must enter "Practice" mode, highlight Yendas and then press Punch, Kick, Kick, Punch, Kick, Kick, Punch, Punch, Kick, Kick.

== Soundtrack ==
An official soundtrack for Motor Raid was released on January 21, 1998 by Marvelous Entertainment. The soundtrack also features music from the later Sega arcade game, Sega Water Ski.

== Reception ==
In Japan, Game Machine listed Motor Raid on their December 15, 1997 issue as being the seventh most-successful dedicated arcade game of the month.

== Ports ==
While never officially released on any hardware outside of the arcades, the game is playable on PlayStation 4, PlayStation 5, Xbox Series X, Google Stadia, Microsoft Windows and Amazon Luna as part of the 2018 video game Judgment, as well as its sequel Lost Judgment. In both titles, Motor Raid can be played in the in-game virtual arcades, alongside several other Sega titles.
