= List of Tetris variants =

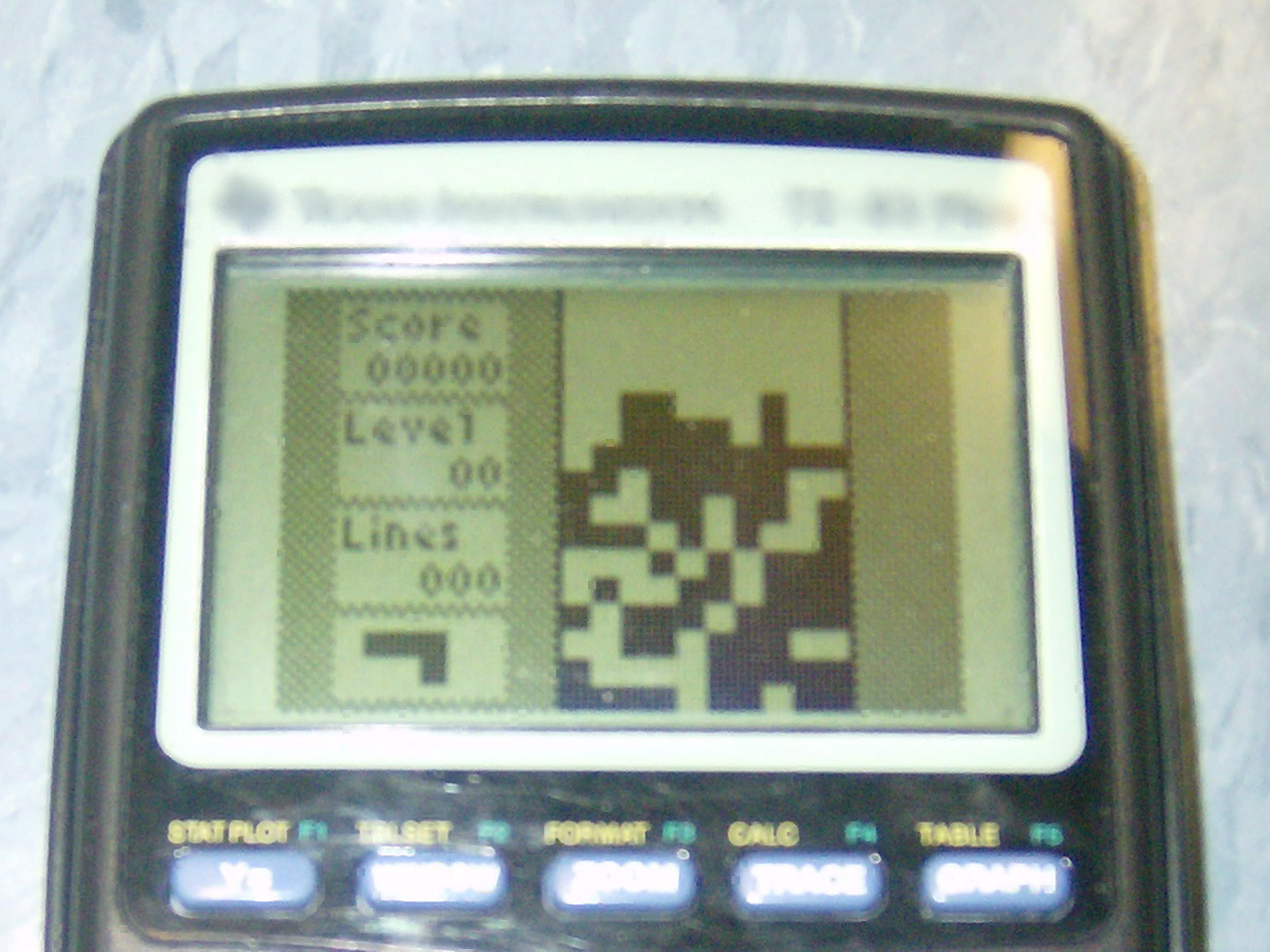
Tetris-like games have been created on a large variety of platforms, including TI-83 series graphing calculators.

This is a list of variants of the game Tetris. It also includes officially licensed Tetris sequels, as well as unofficial clones. In 2017 Guinness World Records reported Tetris to be the game with most official versions released, at 220, over 65 different platforms.

== Official games ==
Title	Year	Platform	Publisher	Description
Tetris	1988	Amstrad CPC, Amstrad PCW, Amiga, Atari ST, BBC Micro/Acorn Electron, Commodore 64, MSX, ZX Spectrum	Mirrorsoft	Ports developed by Rowan Software.
Tetris	1988	Amiga, Apple II, Atari ST, Apple IIGS, IBM PC, MS-DOS, Mac OS	Spectrum HoloByte	Included in the compilation Tetris Gold.
Tetris	1988	PC-9800 series, X68000, FM-7, PC-88, MSX2	Bullet-Proof Software	
Tetris	1988	Famicom	Bullet-Proof Software	This version is also available on AtGames' Legends Flashback console.
Tetris	1988; 1989; 2019	Arcade; Mega Drive	Sega	Sega's arcade version of Tetris was released in December 1988. In Japan, it was the highest-grossing arcade game of 1989, and remained among the top ten annual highest-grossing arcade conversion kits through 1995. Mega Drive version developed by Sanritsu Denki, which was cancelled, resulting in less than ten copies being printed. A new version based on the arcade version was released on the Sega Genesis Mini in 2019.
Tetris	1988	Arcade	Atari Games	
Tetris	1988	TRS-80 CoCo	Tandy	Developed by ZCT Systems.
Tetris	1989	NES	Tengen	Pulled from shelves following a court ruling.
Tetris	1989	Game Boy	Nintendo	Bundled in the North American and European releases of the Game Boy itself and the first game compatible with the Game Link Cable, a pack-in accessory that allowed two Game Boys to link together for multiplayer purposes.
Tetris	1989	NES	Nintendo	
Welltris	1989	PC	Spectrum HoloByte	Designed by Alexey Pajitnov and developed by Doka. Pieces (including tetrominoes and occasionally pentominoes) slide down one of four wall surfaces in a well, the "well" being an 8x8 square. When a piece lands while fully or partially sticking outside of the well, the wall is temporarily blocked. The game ends when four walls are no longer accessible. Other versions: Amiga, Mac OS (1990, Infogrames [Europe], Spectrum HoloByte [US]); ZX Spectrum, CPC, C64 (1991, Infogrames); Arcade (1991, Video System)
Tetris	1990	Microsoft Windows	Microsoft	Part of the Microsoft Entertainment Pack.
Hatris	1990	NES, Game Boy	Bullet-Proof Software	Designed by Alexey Pajitnov. A variety of hats must be made to fall into stacks of five identical hats. Other versions: Arcade (1990, Video System); PC-Engine (1991, Microcabin)
Faces...tris III	1991	Amiga, MS-DOS	Spectrum HoloByte	Winner of the 1991 Software Publishers Association Excellence in Software Award for Best Action/Arcade Program. Alexey Pajitnov's fourth and final official game in the "Tris" series. Developed by Sphere, Inc. The player must arrange falling pieces to form a complete face, which include famous historical figures. Features 10 themed difficulty levels and a head-to-head mode.
Super Tetris	1991	MS-DOS, Amiga, Mac OS	Spectrum HoloByte	Developed by Sphere, Inc. Added bombs, new special block types, and two-player co-operative and competitive modes. Bombs appear in some blocks, which explode when the row is filled and removed.
Tetris	1991	CD-i	Philips	Notable for its soundtrack.
Tetris 2 + Bombliss	1991	Famicom	Bullet-Proof Software	Originally developed by Chunsoft, Tetris 2 + Bombliss (テトリス2+BOMBLISS) was directed by Koichi Nakamura and produced by Tsunekazu Ishihara. One mode, "Bombliss", features bomb blocks that destroy surrounding blocks when a line is completed. Bombliss uses the gravity algorithm to re-arrange the stage after an explosion has destroyed some blocks. A "Tetris C" mode automatically raises the playfield one level after a certain number of blocks are used. Other versions: Super Tetris 2 + Bombliss (スーパーテトリス2+ボンブリス) (1992, Super Famicom, Bullet-Proof Software); Super Tetris 2 + Bombliss Limited (スーパーテトリス2+ボンブリス 限定版) (1994, Super Famicom, Bullet-Proof Software)
Tetris Classic	1992	MS-DOS	Spectrum HoloByte	Includes background graphics depicting scenes from Ruslan and Ludmila, a soundtrack based on Russian folk melodies, and a number of cooperative and competitive two-player modes
Tetris 2	1993	NES and Game Boy	Nintendo	Uses disconnected colored tetrominos instead of adjacent type tetrominoes, the goal of Tetris 2 is to clear all the bombs by making the blocks of the same color stick together. Released as Tetris Flash in Japan. Other versions: Super NES (1994, Nintendo)
Tetris Battle Gaiden	1993	Super Famicom	Bullet-Proof Software	Similar to Puyo Puyo in use of competitive mode, characters, and humorous storyline. Different characters can also unleash special moves that affect the opponent in some way. Also includes a Rensa mode, in which gravity takes a bigger part. Came to the attention of European gamers by way of a review in Issue 18 (April 1994) of Super Play magazine.
Tetris & Dr. Mario	1994	Super NES	Nintendo	Compilation of Tetris and Dr. Mario with enhanced graphics and sound.
Super Tetris 3	1994	Super Famicom	Blue Planet Software	Sparkliss is similar to Bombliss, but the bombs have orthogonal explosions. Some blocks need to be hit more than once by explosions before they are destroyed.; Magicaliss has pieces that may also be one of four colors. Making a full line with one color destroys all the blocks of that color in the stage. The remaining blocks fall in place.; Familiss is a four-player multiplayer Tetris. Each playfield in this mode is 7 columns across, instead of the usual 10 columns.
V-Tetris	1995	Virtual Boy	Bullet Proof	Japanese-exclusive. It is not to be confused with the similar Virtual Boy title 3D Tetris, as the two games are entirely different. V-Tetris is mostly the same as the original Tetris games, the only difference being the cylindrical puzzle mode in which blocks could be placed in a 3-D spiral. By using the L and R buttons, or the right D-pad, the screen shifts a block left or right respectively.
Tetris Blast	1996	Game Boy	Nintendo / Bullet Proof	Known in Japan as Super Bombliss, Tetris Blast was developed by Bullet Proof, and published by Nintendo. It was released for the Game Boy in Japan on 17 March 1995, in North America on January 23, 1996. It is the same as the Bombliss mode in Super Tetris 2 & Bombliss. In an added "Fight" mode, there are creatures that traverse the constantly changing 'terrain' of the play field and try to hinder the player from clearing the screen of blocks. Players can battle others by using a link cable.
Tetris Attack	1996	Super NES and Game Boy	Nintendo, Intelligent Systems	A version of the Japanese game Panel de Pon with redone art made to resemble Super Mario World 2: Yoshi's Island. Has no relation to Tetris other than name and genre. Also spawned Pokémon Puzzle League for the N64, Pokémon Puzzle Challenge for the Game Boy Color, Puzzle League for the Game Boy Advance, and Planet Puzzle League for the Nintendo DS.
3D Tetris	1996	Virtual Boy	Nintendo	Released only in the United States. Different from the version (V-Tetris) released in Japan. The 3D well mode is similar to Welltris.
Tetris Jr.	1996	LCD game	Blue Planet Software	A keychain Tetris game with eight game modes. A port for Windows was also developed.
Tetris S	1996	Saturn	Bullet-Proof Software	Released only in Japan.
Tetris Plus	1995; 1996; 1997	Arcade, PlayStation, Sega Saturn, Game Boy	Jaleco; Nintendo	Added to the classic Tetris is the new Puzzle Mode. Each level begins with a character (the professor) standing on a different pattern of blocks. This is somewhat is similar to Welltris. The goal is to clear the blocks out from under him to get him to the bottom. He climbs to the top of the blocks being stacked up and the game ends when the professor and the descending spiked ceiling collide.
Tetris Plus 2	1997	Arcade	Jaleco	This version is an improved version of Tetris Plus.
Tetrisphere	1997	Nintendo 64	Nintendo	Uses some of the tetrominoes (as well as two 3-block piece) with different gameplay than standard Tetris. The object of the game is to reveal the core in the center of the sphere (which is actually a torus as seen through a fisheye perspective). To achieve this, players must stack similarly shaped pieces on top of each other. Once three are stacked, the pieces disappear and reveal the layer below. If the player doesn't clear blocks fast enough they lose one life, and if they lose three, the game is over. Wild card pieces, power-ups and a limited ability to slide pieces over the surface of the sphere all help with this task.
Tetris DX	1998	Game Boy Color	Nintendo	The Game Boy version of Tetris updated for the Game Boy Color.
Tetris 4D	1998	Dreamcast	Bullet-Proof Software	
Tetris 64	1998	Nintendo 64	SETA Corporation	Includes Normal Tetris, Giga Tetris that has tetrominoes of different sizes, and Bio Tetris that determines the shape and complexity of falling pieces based on feedback from a heartbeat measuring clip that attaches to the player's ear.
Tetris: The Grand Master	1998; 2022	Arcade, PlayStation 4, Nintendo Switch	Arika / Capcom; Hamster Corporation	Released in Japan, designed for seasoned and skilled Tetris players. At higher levels, tetriminoes begin to drop so fast that they appear immediately at the bottom, with no airborne phase at all; Players only have a split-second to slide the block into designated locations before they lock down. This distinctive style is called "20G". Subsequent entries in the Grand Master series continued the high-speed trend. Hamster Corporation re-released a console port through the Arcade Archives series on December 1, 2022.
Kids Tetris	1999	PC	Hasbro Interactive	Tetrominoes start out with two blocks and increase with further lines. Circus, Firehouse, Haunted House and Laboratory stages have different graphical effects with each cleared level. Includes printing option.
The New Tetris	1999	Nintendo 64	Nintendo	Tetris with a new feature: when a 16-block (4 by 4) square is made, the tetrominos used to form the square are merged as 16-block squares. A square formed using different types of tetrominos is called a combo square or multisquare, and it appears silver. A square formed using four of the same piece is called a pure square or monosquare, and it appears gold. All pieces but the S and Z can form monosquares.
Tetris	1999	Ericsson T28	Ericsson	
The Next Tetris	1999; 2001	PlayStation, PC; Nuon	Hasbro Interactive; Crave Entertainment	The Next Tetris was a version of the game with an emphasis on the cascade mode.
Magical Tetris Challenge	1999; 2000	Nintendo 64, PlayStation; Game Boy Color	Capcom; Activision; SCEE	Story mode with Disney characters. The game implements a new Tetris deviation of combos, where consecutive cleared lines give those clears greater value. Non-story variations include magical, updown, and endless mode with other modes which can be unlocked in the story mode.
Sega Tetris	1999; 2000	Arcade, Dreamcast	WOW Entertainment	
The Next Tetris: On-line Edition	2000	Dreamcast	Crave Entertainment	Version of The Next Tetris with overhauled presentation and visuals and online play added. Released in Europe in 2001 as The Next Tetris with online functionality removed.
Tetris: The Absolute – The Grand Master 2	2000; 2023	Arcade, PlayStation 4, Nintendo Switch	Arika / Psikyo; Hamster Corporation	Sequel to Tetris: The Grand Master, featured faster gameplay than its predecessor. A later upgrade, Tetris: The Absolute – The Grand Master 2 Plus, featured several new modes including the "Death Mode" where tetriminoes fall furiously fast right from the beginning. Hamster Corporation re-released a console port through the Arcade Archives series on June 1, 2023.
Tetris With Cardcaptor Sakura: Eternal Heart	2000	PlayStation	Arika	Released only in Japan, a Cardcaptor Sakura-themed Tetris game. It presents puzzles in which the player (as Sakura Kinomoto) has to transform the Clow Cards into Sakura Cards by defeating Eriol's Tetris style Puzzles. The game also features player vs CPU and contains hidden extras based on the anime series.
Tetris	2001	Ericsson T68m	Ericsson	
Tetris Worlds	2001	PC, PlayStation 2, Xbox, GameCube	THQ	Includes Tetris, Square Tetris, Cascade Tetris, Sticky Tetris (originally in The New Tetris), Hot-Line Tetris, and Fusion Tetris. Other versions: PlayStation 2 (2002, Blue Planet Software); Nintendo GameCube and Xbox (2002, Radical Ent.); Game Boy Advance (2002, 3d6 Games)
Tetris	2002	WonderSwan Color, SwanCrystal	Vanguard	
Pokémon Tetris	2002	Pokémon mini		Released only in Japan and Europe, a tiny keychain Tetris game with a Pokémon theme. Features the ability to flip pieces horizontally in addition to standard rotation.
Tetris Advance	2003	Game Boy Advance	Success	Tetris Advance is a Tetris game published only in Japan.
Tetris Elements	2004	Windows PC, Mac OS	THQ	Includes classic Tetris and five variations: Stratosphere, which features meteors that can either help or hurt in eliminating rows; Earthquake, where tremors shake the falling shapes and move them around; Tempest, a double Tetris game where players are switched back and forth between screens; Ice, which has falling icicles that will knock into the falling shapes and make them crash down; and Fire, where heat can cause a chain reaction and melt multiple rows.
Tetris: The Grand Master 3 – Terror Instinct	2005	Arcade	Arika / Taito	Sequel to Tetris: The Absolute – The Grand Master 2 Plus with several changes in game mechanics and a "Shirase" mode, analogous to Death Mode but with a drastic speed increase.
Tetris: The Grand Master Ace	2005	Xbox 360	Arika / AQ Entertainment	First console version in the Grand Master series, one of the launch titles for the Japanese launch of the Xbox 360.
Tetris Mania	2006	Mobile Phones	Electronic Arts	Cascade Tetris, Sticky Tetris and Fusion Tetris, all previously in Tetris Worlds.
Tetris DS	2006	Nintendo DS	Nintendo	First version for Nintendo DS. Includes local multiplayer and online multiplayer support. All based around the NES era of games.
iPod Tetris	2006	iPod	Electronic Arts	
Tetris Evolution	2007	Xbox 360	THQ	First seventh generation Tetris game to be released in the United States. Includes play over Xbox Live.
Tetris Zone	2007	Windows PC and Mac OS	Blue Planet Software	Features four game modes and the Combo system. Includes online Leaderboards and game playback.
Tetris Splash	2007	Xbox 360	Tetris Online	First Xbox Live Arcade title for Tetris. It is also the first game published under The Tetris Company's new third party Tetris Online.
Tetris Online Japan	2007	PC	GungHo Online Entertainment	Official online game for Japanese region.
Tetris	2008	N-Gage 2.0	Electronic Arts	Features several modes: Marathon (classic Tetris), Ultra, Versus (against an AI opponent), Clash, and Challenge (local multiplayer).
Tetris Friends	2008	Facebook	Tetris Online	Featured ten game modes, including Marathon, Ultra, Sprint, N-Blox, Sprint 5-Player, 1989, Survival, Battle 2-Player, Battle 6-Player, and Rally 8-Player. Leaderboards were based on Facebook friends, encouraging the "friends" aspect. Tetris Friends permanently shut down on May 30, 2019.
Tetris Party	2008	Wii	Tetris Online / Hudson Soft	A WiiWare title released on 20 October 2008; there were 18 modes, including one which involves building a tower that a tiny person on the stack can climb, and one using the Wii Balance Board.
Tetris Blockout	2008	Mobile	Electronic Arts Mobile	Officially licensed crossover between Tetris and Blockout. Includes three variations: Marathon, Ultra, and 20 Planes.
Tetris Pop	2008	Mobile	Electronic Arts Mobile	Features 17 mini-variations, including Ball, Circuit, Erosion, Filler, Flood, Furnace, Limbo, Meteors, Touchdown, Scanner, Split, Stacker, and Vanilla. Three game modes: Pop, Mix, Chrono. Tetris Pop to be released worldwide for mobile devices. Expected Winter 2008.
Tetris Giant	2009	Arcade	Sega	A giant version of Tetris that features a playing field that is 6 cells wide by 7 cells high as opposed to the almost universal 10 cells wide by 20 cells high. The game is played on a large 70" DLP Projection Monitor and is controlled using giant joysticks with a built-in rumble motor. The base unit is actually a projector which can optionally be detached from the default screen and projected onto a large wall.
Tetris DJ	2009	Mobile	G-mode	A music- and rhythm-focused Tetris game featuring DJ mode, where players earn points by dropping blocks in sync with the music. Released in Japan.
Tetris Party Deluxe	2010	Wii, Nintendo DS	Tetris Online / Majesco / Hudson Soft	Expanded retail version of Tetris Party. Online players can compete with players of original Tetris Party and Tetris Party Live
Tetris Party Live	2010	Nintendo DSi	Tetris Online / Hudson Soft	A DSiWare title featuring several modes (Marathon, VS, Battle, and Dual Spaces). The focus of the game is multiplayer, where players can compete with other players around the world in real-time.
Tetris Battle	2010	Facebook	Tetris Online	Similar in design to Tetris Friends, this game features competitive Tetris modes against friends or random people. Both direct "battles" and competitive 40-line sprints are included.
Tetris (EA Games)	2011	PlayStation 3, PSP	Electronic Arts	Features 10 different variants, which offer different effects such as Treadmill (playing field moves), Gravity (unsupported blocks fall), and Laser (blocks must stay below a descending laser). It also includes new soundtracks. Available for download in the PlayStation Network as a Mini. The PS3 version features exclusive Power Ups, Shared Mode, and Team Battle.
Tetris (EA Mobile)	2011	iOS, Android, Windows Phone, BlackBerry	Electronic Arts	Features two modalities of gameplay: the classic Marathon mode and a new mode named "Magic", what features a new gameplay style and over new 20 levels. It also includes new soundtracks. In fall 2011 the game was removed from the iOS and Android app stores. However, the Android version can actually be purchased on the Amazon Appstore.
Tetris: Axis	2011	Nintendo 3DS	Nintendo	Published on 2 October 2011. It featured modes that used the 3DS's AR card functionality.
Tetris (Premium)	2011	iOS	Electronic Arts	Features two modalities: the classic Marathon mode and a new mode named "Galaxy", what features a new gameplay style and over new 50 levels. It also includes new soundtracks and the classic 8-bit theme from the original Tetris game. Not to be confused with the 2011 game. Following N3TWORK INC.'s acquisition of the Tetris license, both the iOS and Android versions of this game were discontinued and retired from their respective app stores on 21 April 2020.
Tetris Stars	2011	Facebook	Tetris Online	Free-to-play, this casual arcade "digging" style game features a social leaderboard with friends, mouse-based controls, and power up items.
Tetris Blitz	2013	iOS, Android, Windows Phone, Microsoft Windows	Electronic Arts	Each game completes in two minutes, Features exclusive Power Up of the Week, Bonus Blitz minigame, and online leaderboards.
Puyo Puyo Tetris	2014	Nintendo 3DS, Wii U, PlayStation 3, PlayStation Vita, PlayStation 4, Xbox One, Nintendo Switch (2017), Microsoft Windows PC	Sega	Tetris versus Puyo Puyo. The game features modes that allow for playing standalone Tetris, standalone Puyo Puyo, and a Fusion mode that combines the two.
Tetris	2014	Amazon Fire TV	Tetris Online	Featuring three game modes: Marathon, Sprint, or Ultra. Also has over 40 different achievements to earn along the way, as well as global leaderboards to compare a player's progress against other GameCircle participants.
Tetris Battle: Fusion	2014	Amazon Fire TV, Ouya	Tetris Online	A game based on Tetris Battle, which introduces an all-new interactive adventure where players can battle their way through a series of challenging opponents and goals to become a Tetris Master, where they have to collect special Amulets that can be used to give them an added boost as they progress their way to victory. Over 50 Amulets can be collected.
Tetris Ultimate	2014	Nintendo 3DS, PlayStation Vita, PlayStation 4, Xbox One, Microsoft Windows	Ubisoft	To coincide with the franchises' 30th Anniversary and in partnership with The Tetris Company and SoMa Play.
Tetris Effect	2018	PlayStation 4, Microsoft Windows, Oculus Quest	Enhance	Includes support for Virtual reality (PlayStation VR, HTC Vive, Oculus Rift and Oculus Quest) and features a "Zone" mechanic which allows the player to freeze time and clear more than four lines at once. Superseded by Tetris Effect: Connected.
Tetris	2018	J2ME (Series 30+)	Gameloft	
Tetris 99	2019	Nintendo Switch	Nintendo	A multiplayer Battle Royale variant of Tetris exclusive to Nintendo Switch Online members.
Tetris M1ND BEND3R	2019	Browsers	Red Bull	A browser version created by Red Bull. Tetris M1ND BEND3R is a twist on the traditional formula by having different effects whenever the player clears a certain line.
Tetris x Hello Kitty	2019	Browsers	Sanrio	
Tetris (N3TWORK)	2020	iOS, Android	N3TWORK	
Tetris Effect: Connected	2020	Xbox One, Xbox Series X/S; PlayStation 4, Microsoft Windows, Oculus Quest, Nintendo Switch	Enhance	A release of Tetris Effect for the Xbox One, Nintendo Switch and Microsoft Windows that adds a 'connected' suite of multiplayer modes. It was confirmed that the connected multiplayer modes would be ported to the original Tetris Effect as an expansion in Summer 2021.
Puyo Puyo Tetris 2	2020	PlayStation 4, Xbox One, Nintendo Switch, Nintendo Switch 2, PlayStation 5, Xbox Series X/S, Microsoft Windows	Sega	Sequel to Puyo Puyo Tetris. The game features additions like a new Skill Battle mode containing skills and item cards unique to various characters.
Tetris Beat	2021	Apple Arcade	N3TWORK Inc.	A mobile Tetris game exclusive to Apple Arcade. A new twist to the formula that introduces songs from real life artists and rhythm based gameplay.
Tetris Forever	2024	PlayStation 4, PlayStation 5, Xbox One, Xbox Series X/S, Nintendo Switch, Microsoft Windows	Digital Eclipse	A compilation release commemorating the 40th anniversary of Tetris. Includes playable emulations of multiple Tetris games, an all-new version called Tetris Time Warp, and 90 minutes of documentary footage. Part of Digital Eclipse's Gold Master Series.
Tetris	2024	iOS, Android	PlayStudios	Tetris mobile app including Tetris Levels, Tetris Marathon, and Puzzle Your Way.
Tetris	2024	Game Boy Color	ModRetro	Published by ModRetro and originally bundled with the Chromatic, the company's Game Boy Color clone console.
Tetris: The Grand Master 4 – Absolute Eye	2025	Microsoft Windows	Arika	The fourth entry in the Tetris: The Grand Master series. New modes include Konoha, which involves clearing the board using giant Tetriminos, and Shiranui, a mode where players play versus matches against increasingly difficult AI opponents.
Tetris Block Party	2026	iOS, Android	Playstudios	Instead of falling blocks, the player drags and drops blocks on a static board. Soft launched in February 2025.

== Unofficial games ==
Title	Year	Platform	Developer	Description
Tetris	1986	ZX Spectrum	Andic Software (UK)	Tetris clone.
Tetris	1986	ZX Spectrum	V.A. Baliasov (Russia)	Tetris clone.
Nyet	1988	PC, MS-DOS	David Howorth	Freeware clone of Tetris
Tetris	1988	ZX Spectrum	Mirrorsoft Ltd (UK)	Tetris clone.
Tetris	1988	ZX Spectrum	Rafii Soft (Poland)	Tetris clone.
3D Tetris	1989	ZX Spectrum	Antic Software (Czech)	3D-Tetris.
EGAint	1989	PC, MS-DOS	Eric Ng	Like "Standard Tetris" but with options of more/less complex dropping figures (Polyominoes). Easiest level included 1-square figures (also known as Monominoes). Hardest level included figures of up to 8-square figures (octominoes), including "holes".
Tetris	1989	ZX Spectrum	Milan Vosika (Czech)	Tetris clone.
Tetris 3Z	1989	ZX Spectrum	Zdeno & Peter	Tetris clone.
KUBIS	1989, 1996 updated	Atari ST series up to TT and Falcon	Julian F. Reschke	GEM accessory which can be started out of any GEM application through the DESK menu. First release was in 1989, enhanced version in 1996.
Tetris 2	1990	ZX Spectrum	Fuxoft	Designed by František Fuka. 8-bit ZX Spectrum game for two players.
Frac4D	1990	MS-DOS	Per Bergland, Max Tegmark	A version in which the falling pieces are tesseracts that can be rotated in four dimensions.
Tetris	1990	ZX Spectrum	Fuxoft (Czech)	Tetris clone.
Twintris	1990	Amiga	Digital Marketing	Dual version of Tetris originally designed for the Commodore Amiga, with less known ports to other platforms.
Super Twintris	1991	Amiga	Big Brother Copy (BBC)	Supposed sequel to Twintris with nothing but minor improvements.
TERTIS	1991	Acorn Archimedes	SICK	Unofficial version of Tetris for Acorn Archimedes from Irish developer SICK. Heavily leans into the game's origins to the Soviet Union, with the cursor even being represented by a hammer and sickle. Appears to use the BBC Micro release as a base, as it includes the block statistics bar, but adds graphical features such as simple polygonal models for both high score letters and current block in play. Only features single player score attack and interestingly is labelled as both TETris and TERtis in-game, in multiple menus, at the same time.
Tetris	1991	ZX Spectrum	AcademySoft (Russia)	Tetris clone.
Tetris	1991	ZX Spectrum	Tera Software (Russia)	Tetris clone.
Tetris Max	1992	Mac OS Classic	Steve Chamberlin	A shareware Tetris game. In 1993, Tetris Max received an honorable mention in the MacUser shareware awards.
Block Buster	1992	Watara Supervision	Bon Treasure Co., Ltd.	
Tetris	1992	ZX Spectrum	Shop for Games (Slovakia) / Borec Software (Slovakia)	Tetris clone.
Bomb Tetris	1993	ZX Spectrum	Micro ART (Russia)	Tetris clone.
Night Tetris	1993	ZX Spectrum	Chemist Soft (Russia)	Tetris clone.
Russian Tetris	1993	ZX Spectrum	THD (Russia)	Tetris clone.
Super Tetris	1993	ZX Spectrum	Yunior Soft (Russia) / TK Ltd (Russia)	Tetris clone.
Tetris 1.4	1993	ZX Spectrum	Pavel Foltán (Czech)	Tetris clone.
Tetris 4	1994	ZX Spectrum	Viktor Drozd (Belarus)	Tetris clone.
Edtris 2600	1994	Atari 2600	Ed Federmeyer	Tetris clone.
5 in 1 Tetris	1995	ZX Spectrum	Mortal Kombat Hackers Group (Russia)	Tetris clone.
Ammytris	1995	ZX Spectrum	Gomel Belarius	Simple Tetris clone.
Sextris	1995	ZX Spectrum	Silicon Brains Group	Tetris with a female face on the background.
Tetris	1995	ZX Spectrum	R&S Compani (Belarus)	Tetris clone.
Tiny Tetris	1995	ZX Spectrum	Oleg N. Cher (Ukraine)	Tetris clone.
T-Tris	1996	Atari Lynx	B.Schick/L.Baumstark	Adaptation with save game option and up to 16 players. First Lynx homebrew game.
Digital Tetris	1996	ZX Spectrum	Smash (Russia)	Tetris with faces appearing on the left of the screen.
Double Tetris	1996	ZX Spectrum	MAS (Lithuania)	Full screen tetris.
Tetris II	1996	MSX2, MSX2+, MSX turbo R	Renegade, Artic Soft, MicroTec	
Home Tetris	1996	ZX Spectrum	Russian Bear Group (Russia)	Tetris clone.
Super Tetris 2	1996	ZX Spectrum	Accept Corp (Russia)	Tetris clone.
Bubble Tetris	1997	ZX Spectrum	P.O.V. (Russia)	Tetris clone with screen distortion.
Wordtris		Windows PC; Super NES; Game Boy		Players try to complete words found in the dictionary file.
Mega Tetris 2000	1999	ZX Spectrum	Push & DGMS (Russia)	Tetris clone.
Super Tetris	1999	ZX Spectrum	Alex Art (Russia)	Tetris clone.
La Bastille	2000	Linux	Tech House, Brown University	A version implemented on the 10-story tall science library building at Brown University, using Linux.
Tetris 1D	2002		Ziga Hajdukovic	A joke version with a single column. The player is repeatedly given only the long piece, and only has one control key (to increase the falling rate.) 1D Tetris was included in the "Zero Gamer" Exhibition as a "game that tests the viewers' endurance in meditative inaction."
Quinn	2006	Mac OS X	Simon Haertel	Recreation of Tetris with network capability through TCP/IP and Bonjour. The Tetris Company requested removal in 2006, but it was available as of 2008 with a disclaimer that it is not "affiliated with or sponsored by The Tetris Company or part of their Tetris line of products."
Mockatetris	2008	ZX Spectrum	Rafal Miazga (Poland)	Tetris clone.
Tris	2008	Mac OS X	Witherspoon	Removed from Mac App Store at the request of The Tetris Company.
Tetris Grand Master 3	2008	Nintendo DS	MeRAMAN	A remake of the arcade game Tetris: The Grand Master with additional features such as invisible blocks.
NullpoMino	2008	Windows PC; Linux; Mac OS X	NullNoname	Open-source Tetris fan game notable for its variety of gameplay modes and customizability. The Nullpomino League Edition allowed for tournament play and sprint training. NullpoMino gameplay videos of Mario and Luigi patterns were shown in the Yoasobi Sanshimai show.
Mino	2009	iOS	Xio Interactive, Inc.	A game with the same mechanics as Tetris. Mino also featured multiplayer support for up to four players. In a 2012 U.S. District Court ruling, Mino was found to have infringed on the Tetris Company's copyrights because it had replicated a combination of visual elements from the official Tetris.
Color Tetris	2010	ZX Spectrum	Perspective Group (Russia)	Tetris clone.
Not Tetris	2010	PC	Maurice Guegan	Adds free rotation and physics engine behavior to the falling blocks.
Tetris 2 Returns	2011	ZX Spectrum	Hippiman (Russia)	Tetris clone.
BizTros	2011	Web browser	William Bereza	Tetris clone on Tumblr.
Jstris	2014	Web browser	jezevec10	A free-to-play online multiplayer block game. Jstris is a simple online multiplayer block game built in JavaScript, HTML5, and Python (server), comparable to "battle royale" game such as Tetris 99.
Tetraminos	2016	PC, Xbox One, PS4, Wii U	Sanuk Games	Adds 5 non-default tetramino shapes, combos and extra point for single color lines.
Tetris	2018	ZX Spectrum	Howard Price (UK)	Tetris clone.
Tetris	2019	ZX Spectrum	Ozzyoss Software (Czech)	Tetris clone.
Tetris Championship Edition	2020	ZX Spectrum	Fitosoft	Simple Tetris clone.
TETR.IO	2020	Web browser	osk	An online multiplayer stacker game with global leaderboards, worldwide matches, and a free-for-all style gamemode where players climb the "Zenith Tower". In 2021, TETR.IO had 2.6 million active players worldwide.
Tetris	2021	ZX Spectrum	Rui Martins	Simple Tetris clone.
TEMU GB Tetris Emulator	2021	ZX Spectrum	40crisis	Tetris clone.
Tetris	2021	ZX Spectrum	Bubu (Spain)	Tetris clone.
Brick Gang World	2022	Android	Blackjack Company	Features 29 different shapes of puzzle tiles with options such as Invisible mode and is designed for skilled Tetris players.
Fitris	2023	ZX Spectrum	Bubu	Arcade Tetris clone.
Kuatris	2023	ZX Spectrum	MrRancio	Simple Tetris clone.
Tetris4px	2023	ZX Spectrum	Ignacobo	Small screen Tetris clone.
Zetrix	2023	ZX Spectrum	Retroteam	Illegal copy of Ammytris.
Drop Duchy	2025	Windows Xbox	The Arcade Crew	Tetris inspired roguelike deck building strategy game.

== See also ==
- List of puzzle video games
