= Tetris: Axis =

2011 video game

- Developer: Hudson Soft
- Publishers: JP: Bandai Namco Games (Note: Released under the Bandai brand name.); NA: Nintendo of America; PAL: Tetris Online
- Producer: Tony Tran
- Composer: Brian DiLucente
- Series: Tetris
- Platform: Nintendo 3DS
- Release: Retail: NA: October 2, 2011; JP: October 20, 2011; EU: October 21, 2011; AU: October 27, 2011; Nintendo eShop: JP: February 28, 2013; NA: April 18, 2013; PAL: June 6, 2013
- Genre: Puzzle
- Modes: Single-player, multiplayer

Tetris: Axis, released as Tetris in some regions, is a puzzle video game developed by Hudson Soft for the Nintendo 3DS. The game was released in all regions in October 2011 and was published by Bandai Namco Games in Japan, Nintendo in North America, and Tetris Online in Europe and Australia.

== Game modes ==
Tetris: Axis features 25 total game modes, which are divided up into three modes, Featured modes, Party modes, and AR modes. When playing multiplayer modes online, matches can support up to eight players. The game also supports Download Play for the Fever, Marathon, and Versus Battle modes.

- Fever: The player must get as many points as possible in only a minute of time. Racking up a certain number of points as quickly as possible earns the player color bonuses which when used, alter the gameplay and rack up extra points. Items for the Fever mode can be exchanged through other players systems via SpotPass.
- Computer Battle: The player competes against computer players where clearing lines floods the opponent's area with garbage blocks that can only be eliminated by clearing them.
- Marathon: The standard mode of gameplay.
- Survival: The player plays in an extra-narrow area while blocks are constantly rising up from the bottom. The game ends if the stack of blocks rises to the top.
- Jigsaw: Every piece contains a part of a picture and the piece must be correctly oriented before it is dropped into place.
- Shadow Wide: There is a picture shadowed out on the lower screen and the pieces must be dropped in to reveal it.
- Fit: The pieces are flying continuously at a wall with a hole cut out in it and the shapes must be moved to fit through the hole or else crash into the wall.
- Tower Climber: Similar to the tower climber mode in Tetris Party except that the tower is now a 3D cylinder.
- Bombliss Plus: Based on the Bombliss variant, every piece has a bomb inside and clearing a row containing one makes it explode and clear out all surrounding pieces.
- Stage Racer: Similar to the stage racer mode in Tetris Party, the player must guide a single piece through a continuously moving obstacle course, with the game ending if the piece hits the top.
- Capture: Colored stars are hidden within the playfield and the player can only remove them by touching them with blocks of the same color.
- Master Mode: A variant of the standard mode where the pieces appear on the field instantly instead of falling down.
- Sprint: The player must clear 40 lines in as little time as possible.

=== Augmented reality modes ===
- AR Marathon: The player must clear 50 lines as fast as possible. Some block contain bombs which shift the field if activated, requiring the player to move the system to reorient it.
- AR Climber: Similar to the Tower Climber mode except the player must manually rotate the tower.

== Development ==
Tetris: Axis was developed by Hudson Soft, which was acquired by Konami during development. Despite the acquisition, the development team remained intact and continued with development. All game modes were designed with the system's stereoscopic 3D display in mind, particularly the AR modes. According to Tetris Online producer Tony Tran, taking advantage of the stereoscopic 3D effects was a priority during development. Online multiplayer borrowed most of its foundation from the Nintendo DS titles Tetris Party Deluxe (2010) and Tetris Party Live (2010), with the primary addition being new items to use against opponents. It is the third Tetris video game to be playable in 3D, with the previous two games, V-Tetris (1995) and 3D Tetris (1996), both made for the Virtual Boy. The music was composed by Brian DiLucente. DiLucente created fifteen arrangements of songs from the Romantic period, choosing music from various Russian composers. Composers with arranged works in the game include Alexander Borodin, Alexander Glazunov, Anatoly Lyadov, Anton Arensky, Modest Mussorgsky, Nikolai Rimsky-Korsakov, Pyotr Ilyich Tchaikovsky, Sergei Prokofiev, and Theodor Leschetizky.

== Release ==
At E3 2010, a Hudson-developed Tetris game was announced to be in the works. In January of 2011, the name Tetris: Axis was officially revealed in Japan. Tetris: Axis was featured during Nintendo's E3 2011 showcase. It was also featured at Gamescom in 2011.

Tetris: Axis was released on October 2, 2011 in North America and in Europe on October 21 under the name Tetris. It released in Japan on October 20, 2011 published by Bandai Namco Games. To celebrate the game's launch in Japan, in-game items were distributed through SpotPass. It released in Australia on October 27, 2011. Tetris: Axis would later release on the Nintendo eShop across all regions in 2013. In Japan, it released on February 28, 2013. The North American version was released on April 18, 2013.

Both Tetris: Axis and the Virtual Console release of Tetris for Game Boy were removed from the European and North American Nintendo 3DS eShop at the end of December 2014. European regions were given a notification regarding the delisting a month in advance, with there being no prior announcement to the removal of both games in North America. The games were delisted shortly after Tetris Ultimate (2014) debuted on the handheld, and the removals were due to licensing issues after Ubisoft acquired the licensing rights from Nintendo in 2014.

== Reception ==
Reception

Aggregate scores
| Aggregator | Score |
|---|---|
| GameRankings | 76.33% |
| Metacritic | 74/100 |

Review scores
| Publication | Score |
|---|---|
| 1Up.com | B− |
| Destructoid | 7/10 |
| Famitsu | 29/40 |
| Game Informer | 8/10 |
| GamePro | 3.5/5 |
| GameSpot | 7/10 |
| GameZone | 7.5/10 |
| IGN | 7.5/10 |
| Nintendo Life | 7/10 |
| Nintendo Power | 7.5/10 |
| Nintendo World Report | 6.5/10 |
| Pocket Gamer | 4/5 |
| Metro | 7/10 |

Tetris: Axis received mixed or average reviews according to the review aggregation websites Metacritic and GameRankings. In Japan, Famitsu gave it a score of one eight and three sevens for a total of 29 out of 40. The game sold 5,526 physical copies during its first week in Japan.

In his review of Tetris Ultimate, Lucas, writing for Nintendo Force, believed both Tetris: Axis and Tetris DS (2006) featured "much more robust offerings."
