= Tetris (Atari Games) =

1989 video game

- NES box art by Marc Erickson
- Developer: Atari Games
- Publishers: Arcade; Atari Games; NES; Tengen
- Designers: Ed Logg; Kelly Turner; Norm Avellar
- Programmers: Ed Logg; Kelly Turner; Norm Avellar
- Artist: Kris Moser
- Composer: Brad Fuller
- Series: Tetris
- Platforms: Arcade, NES
- Release: Arcade: NA: February 1989; NES: NA: May 1989
- Genre: Puzzle
- Modes: Single-player, multiplayer

Tetris (stylized as TETЯIS) is a puzzle video game developed by Atari Games and originally released for arcades in February 1989. It is based on Alexey Pajitnov's 1985 Tetris, and has the same gameplay as the computer editions. Players must stack differently shaped falling blocks to form and eliminate horizontal lines from the playing field. It has several difficulty levels and two-player simultaneous play.

In May 1989, a conversion of the arcade version was released for the Nintendo Entertainment System under Atari's Tengen brand, which was not licensed by Nintendo. Issues arose with the publishing rights for Tetris, and after much legal wrangling, Nintendo gained the exclusive rights to publish console versions, leaving Atari with only the rights to arcade versions. As a result, the Tengen game was at retail for only four weeks, with fewer than 100,000 copies sold, until Atari was legally required to recall and destroy any remaining inventory of its NES version.

Nintendo produced its own version of Tetris for the NES and Tetris for the handheld Game Boy. Both versions were commercially successful, and Nintendo held the Tetris license for many years. The Tengen release has since become a collector's item due to its scarcity. Various publications have since described Tengen's versions as superior in some ways to Nintendo's official NES release, especially for its two-player simultaneous mode.

== Development and history ==
Tengen's Tetris for the NES in one-player mode. The two-player mode replaces the statistics display with another playfield.

Tengen's Tetris for the NES has a mode where two players (or one player and the computer) attempt to form lines in the same playing field, which is wider than usual.

In 1987, Andromeda Software executive Robert Stein approached Soviet Academy of Sciences researcher Alexey Pajitnov (who invented the original game in 1984-1985 alongside Dmitry Pavlovsky and Vadim Gerasimov) with an offer to distribute Tetris worldwide, and secured the rights to license the game. He in turn sub-licensed the rights to Mirrorsoft for the European market and Spectrum HoloByte for the North American market. After seeing the game run on an Atari ST, programmer Ed Logg petitioned Atari Games to license it for an arcade version, and approached Stein. With the rights secured, Atari Games produced an arcade version, and under its Tengen subsidiary began to remake it for the Nintendo Entertainment System (NES) in June 1988. It was released in May 1989.

Mirrorsoft later sub-licensed the rights to Henk Rogers of Bullet-Proof Software to distribute Tetris in Japan. Around then, Bullet-Proof Software gave Nintendo a proposal of developing Tetris for the Game Boy, and Rogers traveled to Moscow to secure permission to distribute Tetris for the Game Boy. However, because Stein had secured the rights from Pajitnov directly and not from the Soviet authorities, the Ministry of Software and Hardware Export stated that the console rights to Tetris remained unlicensed, and that Atari Games had only an arcade license. In April 1989, Tengen, which had previously filed an antitrust suit against Nintendo, sued Nintendo again claiming rights to distribute Tetris on the NES, and Nintendo counter-sued citing infringement of trademark. In June 1989, one month after the release of Tengen's Tetris, U.S. District Court Judge Fern Smith issued an injunction barring Tengen from further distributing the game, and further ordered all existing copies destroyed. As a result, 268,000 Tetris cartridges were recalled and destroyed after only four weeks at retail.

The Tengen cover has an airbrush painting by well known illustrator Marc Ericksen featuring St. Basil's Cathedral in Red Square, Moscow, with a falling stone concept at its base that mirrors the gameplay. Atari used the same art when advertising the new release, adding a fireworks motif.

Ed Logg said that the Tengen version of Tetris was built from scratch, using no source code or assets from the original. After presenting the game at the Consumer Electronics Show (CES) in Las Vegas, Tengen president Randy Broweleit requested improvements. He wanted the black-and-white pieces to be colorized, and Logg complied prior to the next CES. When asked which version of Tetris he liked the most, Logg stated the Nintendo version for the NES "wasn't tuned right" due to a lack of logarithmic speed adjustment, yielding overly steep increases in difficulty.

== Reception ==
Tetris was a commercial success in arcades. Atari Games sold 5,600 arcade units in the United States. In addition, they earned royalties from sub-licensing to Sega, who released their own earlier arcade version for Japan in 1988. In total, Tetris sold about 15,000 to 20,000 arcade units worldwide, including both the Sega and Atari versions.

By the time of the court order demanding Tengen cease distribution of the game and destroy all remaining copies, roughly 100,000 copies of the NES game had been sold, and it has since become a collector's item. It has been called superior to Nintendo's own release for the NES, with 1UP.com noting its termination as a loss for players, citing its gameplay and two-player mode, but in another article, it noted that without the hype surrounding the game during the lawsuit, Tengen's Tetris would have likely been forgotten. GamesRadar stated similar sentiments, praising Tengen's version and noting that the Game Boy version was also superior to Nintendo's licensed NES version. IGN placed the Tengen version at #48 on its list of the Top 100 NES games, noting its superiority to the official Nintendo version, which is not on the list.
