= Twisted Tales (disambiguation) =

Twisted Tales is an anthology horror comic book series.

Twisted Tales may also refer to:

- Twisted Tales (Australian TV series), a 1996 Australian anthology television series
- Twisted Tales (British TV series), a 2005 British anthology television series
- Twisted Tales (web series), a 2013 horror web series by Tom Holland
- Twisted Tales, a set of books within the Horrible Histories franchise
- A Twisted Tale, also called Twisted Tales, a series of young adult Disney novels by several authors

== See also ==
- The Twisted Tales of Felix the Cat, a 1990s animated series starring Felix the Cat
- The Twisted Tales of Spike McFang, an action role-playing video game for the Super Nintendo Entertainment System
