= Tetris Ultimate =

2014 video game

- Cover art
- Developer: SoMa Play
- Publisher: Ubisoft
- Series: Tetris
- Engine: Unity
- Platforms: Nintendo 3DS, PlayStation 4, Xbox One, PlayStation Vita, Microsoft Windows
- Release: 3DS: NA: November 11, 2014; AU: November 13, 2014; EU: November 14, 2014; PlayStation 4, Xbox One: WW: December 16, 2014; PAL: December 17, 2014 (PS4); PlayStation Vita: NA: June 2, 2015; PAL: June 4, 2015; Windows: WW: December 10, 2015
- Genre: Puzzle
- Modes: Single-player, multiplayer

Tetris Ultimate is a puzzle video game developed by American studio SoMa Play and published by Ubisoft. Ubisoft partnered with The Tetris Company to develop the game to celebrate the 30th anniversary of the Tetris franchise.

== Gameplay ==
Tetris Ultimate on Nintendo 3DS features seven modes, including a new single-player Challenge mode. Other versions offer six different game modes.

== Release ==
Tetris Ultimate was first released in November 2014 for the Nintendo 3DS as retail game and as digital download in the Nintendo 3DS eShop. In December 2014, the game became available as a digital download for Xbox One and PlayStation 4. In 2015, the game was released for PlayStation Vita.

Because of the release of Tetris Ultimate, Electronic Arts removed the PlayStation 3 and PlayStation Portable versions of Tetris from the PlayStation Store in January 2014, while Nintendo removed the 1989 Game Boy version of Tetris and the digital download of the 2011 game Tetris: Axis from the Nintendo 3DS eShop in December 2014. From January 2014 to February 2019, Ubisoft held the license rights for the PlayStation 4, Xbox One, Nintendo 3DS, PS Vita, and PC downloadable versions of Tetris.

As of February 2019, Tetris Ultimate has been delisted on all platforms and neither the game nor its DLC are available digitally.

== Reception ==
Reception

Aggregate score
Aggregator	Score
Metacritic	(3DS) 68/100 (PS4) 63/100 (XBO) 59/100

Review scores
Publication	Score
GameRevolution	(XBO) 6/10
GameSpot	7/10
Nintendo Life	(3DS) 8/10
Nintendo World Report	(3DS) 8/10
Official Xbox Magazine (UK)	(XBO) 4/10
Push Square	(PS4) 4/10
Retro Gamer	(XBO) 60%

The game received "mixed or average reviews", according to the review aggregation website Metacritic. GameSpot praised the PlayStation 4 and Xbox One versions for being a good version of Tetris, as well as the extensive customization options, stating, "If all you want is a good version of classic Tetris for your new console, this one will suit your needs well." However, he also criticized the bugginess of the online play and the lack of innovation or new modes. The PlayStation 4 and Xbox One versions were also criticized for the multitude of issues in the online modes.
