= Debug menu =

User interface for debugging

A debug menu or debug mode is a user interface implemented in a computer program that allows the user to view and/or manipulate the program's internal state for the purpose of debugging. Some games format their debug menu as an in-game location, referred to as a debug room (distinct from the developer's room type of Easter egg). Debug menus and rooms are used during software development for ease of testing and are usually made inaccessible or otherwise hidden from the end user.

Compared to the normal user interfaces, debug menus usually are unpolished and not user-friendly, intended only to be used by the software's developers. They are often cryptic and may allow for destructive actions such as erasing data without warning.

== In video games ==
Debugging display in Super Mario 64. This display prints both current memory and CPU usage as well as information about the game's state.

Debug menus are often of interest to video game players as they can be used to cheat, access unused content, or change the game configuration beyond what is normally allowed. Some game developers will reveal methods to access these menus as bonus features, while others may lock them out of the final version entirely such that they can only be accessed by modifying the program.

Debug window in Gearheads that enables players to change the specifications of each toy

The Cutting Room Floor (TCRF) is a website dedicated to researching and documenting hidden content in video games, including debugging material. In December 2013, Edge described the website as "the biggest and most organised" of its kind, and by that time it had 3712 articles.

== In other software ==
Debugging functions can be found in many other programs and consumer electronics as well. For example, many TVs and DVD players contain hidden menus that can be used to change settings that are not accessible through the normal menus. Many cell phones also contain debug menus, usually used to test out functions of the phone to make sure they are working. For example, the hidden menu of the Samsung Galaxy S III has test functions for the vibrator, proximity sensor, sound, and other basic aspects of the phone.
