= The Black Onyx =

1984 video game

- MSX cover art
- Developer: Bullet-Proof Software
- Publisher: Bullet-Proof Software
- Designer: Henk Rogers
- Programmer: Eiji Kure
- Platforms: PC-8801, MSX, FM-7, SG-1000, Famicom, PC-6001, PC-9801, Game Boy Color
- Release: January 1984: PC-8801; JP: January 1984 MSX; JP: 1985; EU: 1985 FM-7; JP: March 1985 SG-1000; JP: 1987 Famicom; JP: July 14, 1988 Game Boy Color; JP: March 2, 2001
- Genre: Role-playing
- Mode: Single-player

The Black Onyx (ザ・ブラックオニキス, Za Burakku Onikisu) is a 1984 role-playing video game released in Japan, developed by Bullet-Proof Software, with development led by Henk Rogers. It was originally released for the NEC PC-8801, and ported to several other platforms. The Famicom version featured completely redesigned gameplay, a new map, and was retitled Super Black Onyx (スーパーブラックオニキス). The Game Boy Color port was developed by Atelier Double and published by Taito. The Game Boy Color port added enhanced visuals and included an option to play through the game with the original game's visual style.

Because of memory limitations, another part of the game was released separately on some platforms as The Fire Crystal (ザ・ファイアクリスタル) (which added a magic system). Two other parts were announced, The Moonstone (ザ・ムーンストーン) (which allowed the party to explore the wilderness), and Arena (アリーナ) (which allowed the party to take part in Arena battles).

The SG-1000 version was one of the last releases for that console, succeeded by Portrait of Loretta.

== Gameplay ==
The player can create a five-member party (four members on GBC), or can ask friendly encounters to join the party to fill empty slots. The party will explore the dungeons under the town of Utsuro (ウツロ) to obtain the legendary Black Onyx. Doing so will break the curse which binds the town in eternal night.

The combat system has no concept of distance, so there are no bows or similar missile weapons. There are melee weapons, shields, and armor, however. The hospital in town can offer "examinations" which display the PCs' stats.

The game displays a health meter to represent hit points.

There is a bank in town where the heroes can deposit money. This protects money from thieves.

The labyrinth under the town has several entrances, each hidden in one of the locations of the town. The labyrinth has six floors corresponding to the six colors the computer can display. These must be solved in the proper order (which depends on the platform) in order to create the stairway to the Black Tower, where the Onyx resides.

== Reception ==
It was one of the first successful Japanese-language RPGs, having sold 150,000 copies, and helped familiarize the Japanese public with RPGs.

== Legacy ==
T&E Soft's Tokohiro Naito, the creator of action role-playing game Hydlide (1984), was influenced by The Black Onyx, and combined its RPG elements with the action gameplay of The Tower of Druaga (1984). Hydlide also borrowed the health meter mechanic from The Black Onyx, and took it a step further with a regenerating health meter. Nintendo's Shigeru Miyamoto said that The Black Onyx influenced The Legend of Zelda (1986), saying that he thought the "character's process of gaining strength was fun."

An English-language fan-translation was made available for the SG-1000 version in 2010 by back-porting from the abandoned source files for an incomplete 2007 hobby conversion project for the ColecoVision system. Another group later used those same source files to complete the project and released an unofficial English-language ColecoVision game in 2013.

The Black Onyx was adapted as a manga titled Susume!! Seigaku Dennou Kenkyuubu (進め！！静学電脳研究部, Shiawase no katachi), published in the Gamest Comics collection from April 1999, drawn by Kouta Hirano.
