= Hidden Palace =

Video game prototype wiki

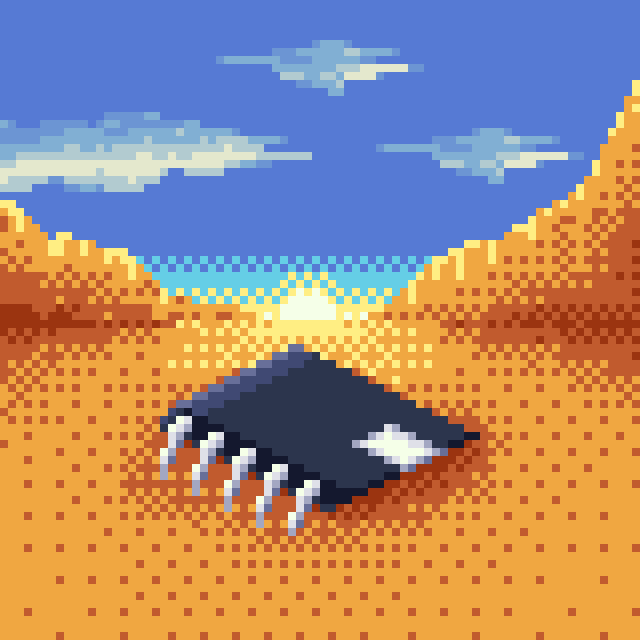

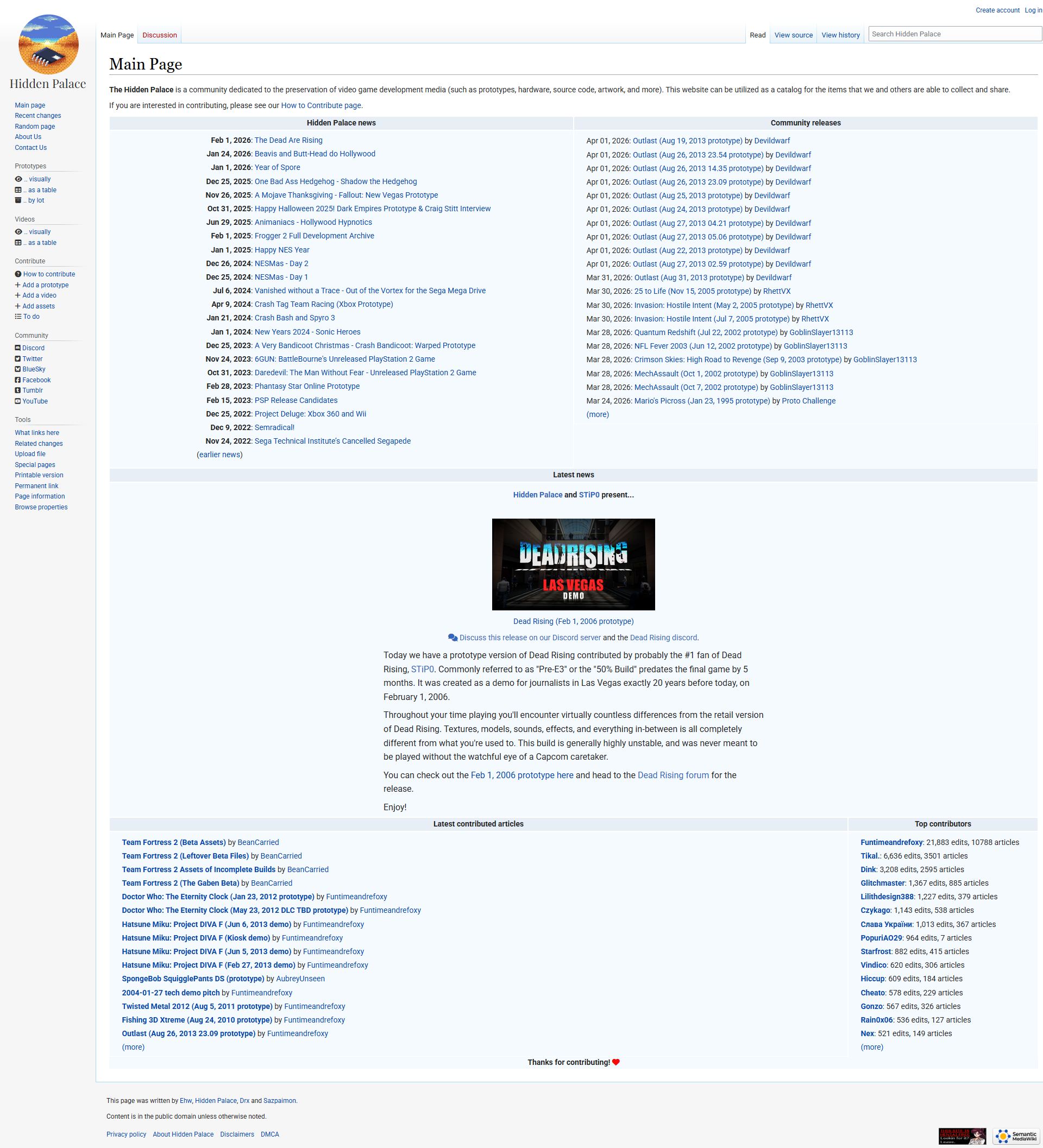
- Screenshot Home page
- Website type: Wiki
- Available in: English
- Website: hiddenpalace.org
- Commercial: No
- Registration: Optional, required for editing pages
- Current status: Online
- Content license: Public domain

Hidden Palace is a website dedicated to video game preservation. It catalogues and showcases early builds and prototypes of games, their source code and other materials from the development process, such as cut content.

== History ==
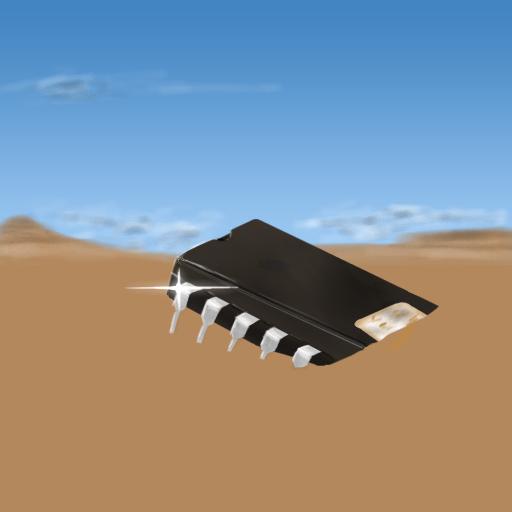
Former logo

Hidden Palace was initially established as a blog on May 2, 2006. After a period of inactivity, it was re-established as a wiki exactly 10 years later on May 2, 2016.

In April 2019, a Hidden Palace user drx discovered two prototypes of a lost Tom and Jerry video game titled Tom Vs. Jerry: The Chase is On!. Originally developed for the Super Nintendo Entertainment System by Software Creations and published by Hi Tech Expressions, it was cancelled in 1991 after Turner Entertainment's purchase of Hanna-Barbera.

In March 2021, the website published over 700 early builds of games for the PlayStation 2 as part of an effort dubbed Project Deluge, including Shadow of the Colossus, God of War II and Crash Bandicoot: The Wrath of Cortex as well as games which were ultimately unreleased. Later in September, 349 builds for the Dreamcast and 135 builds for the Xbox were uncovered alongside a cancelled 2003 English localization of Dinosaur Hunting: Ushinawareta Daichi.

In November 2023, a prototype of a cancelled Daredevil game titled Daredevil: The Man Without Fear was sent to Hidden Palace by an anonymous developer. It was developed by 5,000 Ft for the PlayStation 2, Xbox and Windows. Published by Encore, Inc., it was cancelled in 2004 due to creative disagreements between Sony and Marvel Studios.

In January 2024, the website published an unfinished version of Spyro: Year of the Dragon featuring several previously unreleased level themes.

In June 2025, an unfinished game for the Game Boy Advance based on Animaniacs titled Animaniacs: Hollywood Hypnotics was uploaded to Hidden Palace. It was described as "apparently feature-complete" but "lack[ing] polish" by PC Gamer.

In November 2025, a prototype of the cancelled real-time strategy game Dark Empires was uncovered in collaboration with the Sega Retro researcher Ashley Rojas. It was developed by Sega Technical Institute, starting development in 1990 and ultimately getting cancelled in late 1991 due to being too niche, according to artist Craig Stitt.

In January 2026, a lost Beavis and Butt-Head video game titled Beavis and Butt-Head Do Hollywood was recovered. It was developed for the PlayStation and was around 40% complete during its cancellation in 1998 after a failed pitch to MTV.

== See also ==
- The Cutting Room Floor (website)
- Unfinished creative work#Software
