= Michael Andretti's Indy Car Challenge =

1994 video game

- Japanese cover art
- Developers: Bullet Proof Software; Genki
- Publisher: Bullet Proof Software
- Composer: Takane Ōkubo
- Platform: Super NES
- Release: NA: September 1994; JP: January 20, 1995
- Genre: Arcade-style racing
- Modes: Single-player, multiplayer

Michael Andretti's Indy Car Challenge (マイケル・アンドレッティ インディーカーチャレンジ) is an arcade-style racing video game that is sponsored by Michael Andretti. It was released exclusively for the SNES in North America and Japan.

== Gameplay ==
The game features Champ Car (now called IndyCar) action. There are many modes of play including single race, season mode, and the option to disable the sound and/or music. The season mode consists of 16 tracks. One or two players can join in on the action.

Prior to each race, the player is given the option to adjust tire pressure, downforce, and gear ratio. Higher tire pressure reduces grip on the road but increases acceleration and top speed. Higher down force does the reverse. Higher gear ratio increases top speed but reduces acceleration.

Each track features its own hints in a section called "Michael's Advice". The game is roughly based on the 1994 CART World Series season and the viewpoint is from a third-person perspective.

== Reception ==
In their review, GamePro described the game as solidly designed, with an excellent sensation of speed, meticulous recreation of real life racing tracks, and an impressive replay feature with multiple camera views. However, they opined that the inability to make other cars crash leaves the game devoid of drama. The two sports reviewers of Electronic Gaming Monthly gave it scores of 91% and 82%, praising the graphics, sounds, and playability.

In November 1994, 11-year-old Donald Leandro Jr. of Hawaii, later known online as ShetcanWilly, identified and isolated a previously undocumented routine left in the final game code. Using a contemporary Super Nintendo hardware backup copier, a Game Doctor SF6, Leandro dumped the original cartridge's ROM data for examination and traced the anomaly to a specific input-loop failure affecting the game's graphical transformation routine.

Leandro formally documented his findings and submitted them to publisher Bulletproof Software. Company president Henk Rogers acknowledged the discovery and rewarded Leandro with promotional corporate merchandise, while indicating that the finding would be featured in upcoming Bulletproof Software flyers and gaming publications.
