= Tetris Blitz =

Variant of Tetris, by EA

Tetris
- New app icon
- Developer(s): EA Salt Lake
- Publisher(s): Electronic Arts
- Designer(s): Alexey Pajitnov; Vladimir Pokhilko
- Platform(s): Android, Windows Phone, iOS
- Release: May 17, 2013
- Genre(s): Puzzle
- Mode(s): Single-player, multiplayer

Tetris Blitz was a variant of Tetris. It was developed by EA Salt Lake published by Electronic Arts. It was released free on mobile platforms such as iOS, Android, and Windows Phone. It was released in 2013 and was given mixed reviews. On January 20, 2020, EA announced that the game would be discontinued on April 21, 2020. As of April 22, 2020, it is no longer downloadable on the App Store and Google Play, but due to a glitch, the player may still play the game if they have the game already downloaded.

The game had power-ups to boost players' scores up. Classic ones were Time Shift, Lasers, Quake, and Multiplier. New ones came soon afterwards, thus, they created a "Retro" mode that only consists of the old powerups listed. The game has 4 modes: classic, retro, battles, and tournaments. (One of the new powerups even temporarily added a Progressive (Corporation) powerup.) The latter two were unlocked after leveling up. The pieces had gravity, meaning when a line is cleared, the remaining left over floating parts of the tetrimino fall down to the bottom.

== Frenzy mode ==
By clearing lines, it fills up a frenzy meter, which in turn, activates frenzy mode. Frenzy mode constantly adds frenzy blocks to the bottom half of the screen, kind of like garbage in multiplayer versions of Tetris. The goal is to objectively stay in frenzy mode by making combos, or clearing lines in rapid succession. If a tetrimino does not clear a line, the frenzy meter drops. It takes around 5 misplaced blocks before frenzy mode ends. When frenzy ends, the frenzy blocks stay on the screen, turning into regular blocks with random colors.

== Reception ==
Reception

Aggregate score
Aggregator	Score
Metacritic	69/100

Review scores
Publication	Score
Game Informer	6/10
Pocket Gamer	6/10

The game was given mixed reviews. Google Play rates it with 4.2 stars.

== See also ==
- List of Tetris variants
- Puyo Puyo Tetris
- Puyopuyo!! Quest
