= Dekitate High School =

1995 video game

- Cover art for Dekitate High School
- Developer: C-Lab
- Publisher: Bullet Proof Software
- Platform: Super Famicom
- Release: JP: July 7, 1995
- Genre: Strategy
- Mode: Single-player

Dekitate High School (できたてハイスクール) is a Super Famicom video game that was released to an exclusively Japanese market in 1995 and was considered to be the first "high school simulation" video game to be released for the Super Famicom. Famed Japanese illustrator Nishiki Yoshimune would draw the cover art for the game, while the actual character design was done by the in-house staff at C-Lab.

Trying to find a good place to build a washroom inside a Japanese high school.

The game involves going through a day of high school in Japan as a teacher while managing a star pupil to good grades and popularity. Players can even build their own high schools for the purpose of gameplay, making this game similar to SimCity. A massive amount of yen is given at the start; so players can assign all the classes and even create yards of grass for students to loiter in between classes. Socializing with an assigned student will be more than just teaching her kanji and arithmetic lessons. Menus and multiple choices are used to get through the game with a first-person perspective.

There is even a track and field mini-game that is essentially button mashing. Players can only make a girls' high school; there is no way to make a unisex school or a boys' school. There is a limitation of four floors for a customized high school; considering that the largest high school in Tokyo has four student-accessible floors. Disasters like earthquakes or floods have to be fixed up or else the success rate of the students will become significantly reduced (along with the tuition money received from them). However, but most of the problems can be solved inexpensively.

Players can choose to have their own as the name of the playable female student character, that they must teach from admission to graduation (exactly three in-game years). There are 18 different endings to this game; ranging from game over to the best ending. Up to two save files can be created for this game and character voices are absent along with a mode to access the game's music. An option to fully skip the in-game text is available at all times.

== Characters ==
Albert (アルバート)
A butler that serves the main character's family. He also serves as the vice-principal of the school, offering advice throughout the game.
Reika Mitsurugi (御剣 麗華)
The principal of the high school. She appears at the end of the month, judging the state of affairs and rank of the school.

=== Students ===
Megumi Ayaori (綾織 めぐみ)
Part of the art club. Although she's pretentious and quite selfish, she's very adaptable to change.
Shizuka Kakyōin (花京院 しずか)
Part of the softball team. She's full of energy, but she tends to have a rebellious attitude.
Seria Shiina (椎名 せりあ)
Part of the track and field team. She normally follows the rules, but she has poor judgment and is susceptible to peer pressure.
Emiri Hoshino (星野 えみり)
Part of the gymnastics team. Although her grades aren't great, she's brimming with curiosity. Refers to herself with the pronoun boku.
Kirara Izumi (泉 きらら)
Part of the science club. Her schoolwork is perfectly fine, but her lack of physical stamina means she's often absent due to illness.
Maria Shindō (神童 まりあ)
Arrives when certain conditions are met. Part of the archery club. She takes things at her own pace, without being influenced by the world around her.

== Release and reception ==
Reception

Review score
Publication	Score
Famitsu	7/10, 5/10, 6/10, 7/10

Dekitate High School was released in Japan on July 7, 1995 for the Super Famicom.
