= Tetris DX =

1998 video game

- Developer: Nintendo R&D1
- Publisher: Nintendo
- Platform: Game Boy Color
- Release: JP: October 21, 1998; NA: November 18, 1998; UK: December 3, 1998; EU: 1999
- Genre: Puzzle
- Mode: Single-player

Tetris DX is a 1998 video game developed and published by Nintendo for the Game Boy Color. It is a version of the game Tetris and unlike the 1989 port of the game, it introduces color, new gameplay modes, save games, and multiplayer using the Game Link Cable. DX was released as a launch title for the Game Boy Color in October 1998. Upon release, the game received a positive reception, with praise directed towards its gameplay additions. Following release, critics praised the game as one of the best titles for the Game Boy Color.

== Gameplay ==
Screenshot of the 'Marathon' game mode, showing the color sprites.

As in Tetris, DX is a puzzle video game in which players must fit a vertically descending series of blocks to form complete rows, making the blocks disappear; with the game ending if the blocks fill the screen beyond the top row of the play space. DX introduces additional gameplay modes. The core gameplay mode, 'Marathon Mode', is the closest to the original game, with blocks falling at a faster speed for every line cleared by the player. Additional gameplay modes include 'Ultra Mode', requiring players to clear as many lines within a two-minute time limit, and '40 Lines', where players can set the starting level and height, and must clear 40 lines as quickly as possible. The game also supports competitive play in 'Vs Mode', where players can play against computer opponents on easy, normal or hard difficulty, or another player with a copy of the game by using the Game Link Cable. DX also allows up to four players to save their game data, including names and high scores. Each saved user is given a Power Rating, representing their performance across the game modes.

== Development ==
Tetris Company managing director Henk Rogers stated that Nintendo proposed Tetris DX to the company for the Game Boy Color, with the intent of keeping the design of the original game. DX was a launch title published alongside release of the Game Boy Color. In December 2024, Tetris DX was added to the Nintendo Classics service alongside the NES version of the original game.

== Reception ==
Reception

Review scores
Publication	Score
AllGame	4.5/5
Electronic Gaming Monthly	9/10, 9/10, 8/10, 8.5/10
Game Informer	8.5/10
GameSpot	9/10
Jeuxvideo.com	16/20
Nintendojo	9.7/10
Planet Game Boy	5/5
Total Game Boy	95%

Critics expressed that DX was an improvement over Tetris and its 1989 Game Boy version. However, many reviewers also felt the game was largely the same, and that owners of the original title may not need to purchase the revised version. Total Game Boy praised the addition of color for making it easier to distinguish blocks, and the convenience of the save system, stating it was "wise" for Nintendo to make minimal changes to the core gameplay as there was little to improve. Cameron Davis ofGameSpot praised the game's addictiveness, and opined the addition of Game Link Cable functionality made it potentially one of the "best multiplayer [games] ever made". Describing the game as "more fun than the original", Ty Kris considered the "new play modes and colorization" warranted a purchase for fans of the game. Some critics observed minor differences in Tetris DX compared to the original game. Electronic Gaming Monthly felt DX was easier than its predecessor as the distribution of blocks was "less erratic". Some critics lamented the omission of the background music of the original game.

=== Retrospective reception ===
Several critics have retrospectively listed Tetris DX as one of the best titles released for the Game Boy Color platform. Digital Trends stated that the game's "vibrant color scheme made clearing lines and performing complex maneuvers more engaging" compared to the Game Boy version. Sam Stone of The Escapist felt the "features and technical presentation" of Tetris DX made it a strong remake by "revamping the classic with a dazzling display and additional game modes". Several other critics listed the game as one of the best for the handheld due to the number of improvements to the original title.
