= The Cutting Room Floor (website) =

Video game wiki

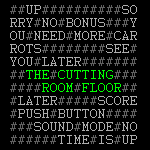

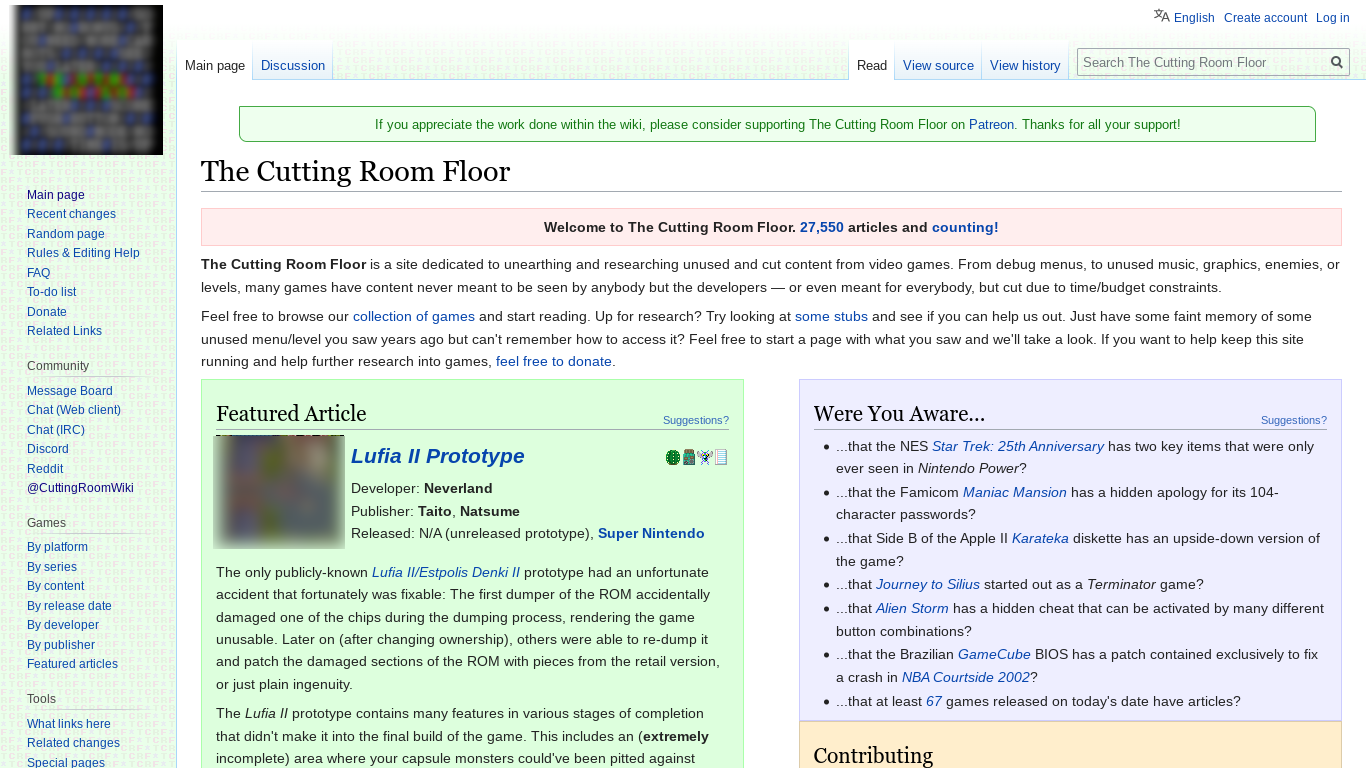
- Website type: Wiki
- Founder: Rachel Mae
- Key people: Xkeeper
- Website: tcrf.net
- Commercial: No
- Registration: Optional
- Launched: 2002; 24 years ago (original form); 2 February 2010; 16 years ago (current form)
- Current status: Active
- Content licence: CC BY 3.0
- Written in: MediaWiki software

The Cutting Room Floor (TCRF) is a website dedicated to the cataloguing of unused content and leftover debugging material in video games. The site and its discoveries have been referenced in the gaming press.

The site started out as part of a blog but was reworked and relaunched as a wiki in 2010. The reworked site is considered by Edge to be a major catalogue of unused video game content.

== History ==
The Cutting Room Floor was started by Rachel Mae in 2002 as part of a blog. It mainly focused on Nintendo Entertainment System games, and was occasionally updated. In the late 2000s, Alex Workman, better known as Xkeeper, reworked the site into a wiki, which launched on 2 February 2010. The site has since specialised in what gaming media, including Edge and Wired, have likened to video game archaeology; Kotaku described them as "routinely responsible" for it. Its members analyse video game code and content using various tools, such as debuggers and hex editors, and if something interesting is found, an "uncover" starts. According to Xkeeper, the site's members co-operatively analyse their findings to work out how to re-enable content. The site's goal is to catalogue "as many deleted elements as possible from all sorts of games".

In December 2013, Edge considered The Cutting Room Floor to be the largest and best-organised catalogue of unused video game content. Around this time, the site had 3,712 articles. In June 2016, Xkeeper said that the website has largely avoided copyright issues. Amongst the more noted discoveries are the secret menus in the Mortal Kombat games, and The Legend of Zelda prototype, which was "extensively" catalogued and what The Cutting Room Floor moderator GoldS considers the site's most important article. The Cutting Room Floor's community is reported to have paid 700 dollars for an unreleased Tetris DS prototype. A coding error in Super Mario Bros. that changed the behaviour of the Spiny eggs also made the gaming press. In May 2018, Kotaku and Eurogamer reported on a Pokémon Gold and Silver prototype and its assets that had been documented on the website. Other material catalogued include hidden messages, as well as regional and revisional differences, such as differences between versions and ports.

In August 2026, The Cutting Room Floor was taken offline following a denial-of-service attack. The website's administrators said the attack was seemingly triggered after a user was banned from using Claude Code to interact with the site, although they did not directly accuse the user of carrying out the attack.

== See also ==
- Cutting room floor
- Hidden Palace
