= Tetris (Game Boy video game) =

1989 video game

- North American box art
- Developer: Nintendo R&D1
- Publisher: Nintendo
- Director: Satoru Okada
- Producer: Gunpei Yokoi
- Designers: Alexey Pajitnov (Note: Original concept, design and program); Hirofumi Matsuoka
- Programmer: Masao Yamamoto
- Composer: Hirokazu Tanaka
- Series: Tetris
- Platform: Game Boy
- Release: JP: June 14, 1989; NA: July 31, 1989; EU: September 28, 1990
- Genre: Puzzle
- Modes: Single-player, multiplayer

Tetris (Note: Japanese: テトリス, Hepburn: Tetorisu) is a 1989 puzzle video game developed and published by Nintendo for the Game Boy. It is a portable version of Alexey Pajitnov's original Tetris and it was bundled with the North American and European releases of the Game Boy itself. It is the first game to have been compatible with the Game Link Cable, a pack-in accessory that allows two Game Boy consoles to link for multiplayer purposes. A remaster, Tetris DX, was released on the Game Boy Color in 1998. It was released for the Nintendo 3DS' Virtual Console in December 2011 without multiplayer functionality. The game was released on the Nintendo Classics service in February 2023.

== Gameplay ==
Tetris gameplay

Naïve gravity in action

In terms of gameplay, the Game Boy version of Tetris is similar to the versions that were released on other platforms at the time. A pseudorandom sequence of tetromino shapes, composed of four square blocks each, fall down the playing field, which is 10 blocks wide by 18 blocks high. The object of the game is to manipulate the tetrominoes by moving each one sideways and rotating it by 90-degree units with the aim of creating a horizontal line of blocks without gaps. When one or more such lines are created, they disappear, and the blocks above (if any) move down by the number of lines cleared. As in most standard versions of Tetris, blocks do not automatically fall into open gaps when lines are cleared.

As the game progresses, the tetrominoes fall faster. The game ends when at least part of a tetromino extends beyond the top of the playfield when setting in place. The player can normally see which block will appear next in a window off to the side of the playing field, but this feature can be toggled during the game. Points are awarded based on the current level and number of lines cleared. The level increases each time the player clears ten lines, as does the speed of falling tetrominoes. The player may adjust the difficulty before beginning a game by selecting a starting level or choosing to pre-fill the play area with a given number of lines of randomly placed blocks. After completing a particular height, the player is treated to a cutscene of a rocket of various types being launched, eventually capping off with Russians dancing and the Buran shuttle being launched.

This version of Tetris includes a two-player mode, in which each player's objective is to remain in play for longer than their opponent, or clear 30 lines first. Each player plays with a separate Game Boy and Tetris Game Pak, with the two consoles connected via the Game Link Cable. When a player scores a Double, Triple, or Tetris, incomplete rows of blocks are added to the bottom of the opponent's stack, causing it to rise.

== Licensing ==
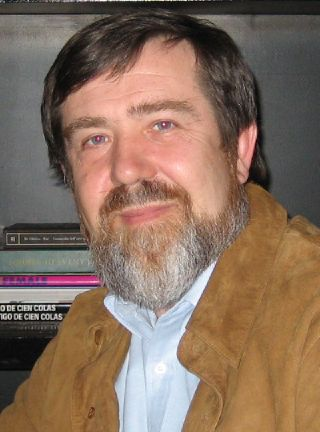
Alexey Pajitnov, the designer of the original Tetris, called the Game Boy version his favorite.

Tetris was first created in 1985 by Alexey Pajitnov. In 1988, Pajitnov teamed with fellow Soviet Academy of Sciences researchers Dmitry Pavlovsky, and Vadim Gerasimov to create a new two-player version of Tetris that ran on PCs. The game was soon licensed by Andromeda Software executive Robert Stein, who sublicensed the game to multiple publishers in different territories. In 1988, Henk Rogers of Bullet-Proof Software noticed the US home computer version at the Las Vegas Consumer Electronics Show in a Spectrum HoloByte booth. Finding himself hooked to the game, he pursued the rights to publish Tetris in Japan, and secured licenses from both Spectrum HoloByte, who held the North American computer license, and Atari Games, which had produced the American arcade version under a sublicense from Mirrorsoft, which had the rights for the European computer market. Knowing Nintendo was planning to release the Game Boy, Rogers approached Nintendo of America president Minoru Arakawa to suggest Tetris as the perfect bundled launch game. Arakawa questioned the idea, having planned to bundle Super Mario Land, but Rogers countered by stating that though a Mario game would promote the Game Boy to young boys, Tetris would promote it to everyone. Rogers was told to pursue the rights; he approached Stein to seek rights for it to be distributed with the Game Boy.

However, after several months passed, Stein had not signed to contract for the rights for the Game Boy, and Rogers learned that another person had approached Nintendo with the idea of a Game Boy Tetris. Requesting more time from Arakawa, he traveled to Moscow to speak with the Ministry of Foreign Economic Relations's bureau for computer hardware and software export, called Elektronorgtechnica or ELORG, and Pajitnov. During this time, Nintendo approached Spectrum HoloByte on the prospect of a Game Boy Tetris, causing Mirrorsoft to send a representative, Kevin Maxwell, to Moscow to secure rights for the Game Boy version. Meanwhile, Rogers negotiated for the rights for Tetris on the Game Boy, noting in a later interview that the government officials did not understand the concept of intellectual property, and were looking for greater payment than Rogers or Nintendo could afford. However, it was revealed that the Tetris property had not actually been licensed to anyone because Stein had secured the rights from Pajitnov directly and not from the Russian authority. Russia sent a fax to Maxwell in England with 48 hours to respond, but due to being in Russia at the time Maxwell did not receive the fax, and the handheld rights were given to Rogers. Rogers licensed the handheld rights to Nintendo. During this time Rogers discovered that the home console rights were actually not properly licensed, and in March 1989, Arakawa, and Nintendo vice president Howard Lincoln, working with Rogers, secured exclusive rights for console distribution of Tetris. However, Tetris's production was delayed due to an ongoing legal battle with Atari Games over their home publishing subsidiary Tengen's version of Tetris for the NES and the game was released in Japan two months after the Game Boy's release there. Bullet-Proof Software is mentioned as a copyright holder and the sub-licensor of the Tetris handheld rights to Nintendo on the game's startup screen.

== Development ==
Tetris for the Game Boy was developed by Nintendo R&D1 after Henk Rogers of Bullet-Proof Software secured the handheld rights and licensed them to Nintendo. The game was directed by Satoru Okada and produced by Gunpei Yokoi. It was programmed by Masao Yamamoto, with graphics design by Hirofumi Matsuoka and original concept credit to Alexey Pajitnov. The soundtrack was composed by Hirokazu Tanaka.

During development Henk Rogers contacted Nintendo because something was wrong with the distribution of pieces in Tetris. The tetromino randomizer initially exhibited a noticeable bias, with certain pieces (particularly S or Z) appearing far more frequently than others. Rogers identified the problem through piece-counting tests and reported it to Nintendo. On Saturday, Rogers and a Nintendo programmer worked at Rogers' office in Yokohama to fix the issue. They implemented a solution that cycled through offset values: the first random number call received +0, the second +1, the third +2, the fourth +3, spreading the statistical anomaly across all pieces rather than concentrating it on any one single piece. The result was randomness being corrected.

=== Design ===
The Game Boy version stays close to Pajitnov's original pure mechanics while adapting them to the handheld's constraints and new capabilities. It includes two single-player modes (A-Type endless marathon with level progression and B-Type 25-line challenges with selectable starting height) and was the first Game Boy title to support the Game Link Cable for two-player competitive play, in which cleared lines send garbage to the opponent.

Pajitnov has repeatedly described the Game Boy version as his favorite and the one closest to his original design.

=== Music ===
The main soundtrack for Tetris was created by Nintendo's accomplished composer Hirokazu Tanaka. The player can select one of three types of background music during the game or play with sound effects only. Two of the songs are arrangements of works from other composers: "Type A" is based on the Russian folk song "Korobeiniki" (also known as "Korobushka"), and "Type C" is an arranged version of "French Suite No. 3 in B minor, BWV 814: Menuet" (transposed to F♯ minor) by Johann Sebastian Bach. In an early version that was only released in Japan with an estimated 25,000 copies sold, the "Type A" song is "Minuet". The compositions "Type A" and "Type B" can be unlocked in the Super Smash Bros. series, where "Type A" can be played on the stage, "Luigi's Mansion" in Brawl and for Wii U, and "Type B" can be played on the stage, "Luigi's Mansion" in Brawl, and "Wuhu Island" in for Wii U, both can be played on any miscellaneous Nintendo series stage in Ultimate.

The victory fanfares played after completing levels are different arrangements of "Trepak", from Pyotr Ilyich Tchaikovsky's ballet The Nutcracker.

== Re-releases ==
An updated version of the game for Game Boy Color, titled Tetris DX, was developed by Nintendo and released in Japan on October 21, 1998, in North America on November 18, 1998, and in Europe and Australia in 1999. Tetris DX features battery-saved high scores and three player profiles. It has a new single-player mode against the CPU and also features two new modes of play. In "Ultra Mode", players must accumulate as many points as possible within a three-minute time period. In "40 Lines", players are timed on how quickly they can clear 40 lines of play. New music themes were added.

The Game Boy version of Tetris was released in North America and Europe as a Virtual Console game for the Nintendo 3DS on December 22, 2011 and on December 28 in Japan. In contrast to the original version, it is not possible to play multiplayer in the Virtual Console version. The Virtual Console version of Tetris was delisted from the Nintendo eShop after December 31, 2014 in Europe and North America.

The Game Boy version was released worldwide on the Nintendo Classics service on February 8, 2023. Unlike the release on the Nintendo 3DS Virtual Console, multiplayer is fully supported. This version can also be played online. The Game Boy Color version was released worldwide on the service on December 11, 2024 to coincide with the 40th anniversary of the series.

== Reception ==
Reception

Aggregate score
Aggregator	Score
GameRankings	GB: 90% GBC: 81%

Review score
Publication	Score
Famitsu	6/10, 8/10, 8/10, 7/10 (GB)

Tetris has been credited as the Game Boy's killer app. It topped the Japanese sales charts during August–September 1989 and from December 1989 to January 1990. It also topped the US sales charts during August–September 1989 and then December 1989.

Nintendo sold 2.5 million copies by early 1990, as its top seller. About 7.5 million copies had been sold in the United States by 1992. By 1997, 29.72 million units had been sold worldwide, including bundles. As of June 2009, more than 35 million copies had been sold worldwide.

In the Weekly Famitsu, the reviewers were familiar with Tetris, saying the game had to be banned from the Famitsu offices. The players said the game's two-player mode was the highlight and felt like a fresh and exciting way to play Tetris, with one reviewer saying that the ability to send blocks to your opponent was "truly ground-breaking." On the other hand, one reviewer said that they wished there was more of a way to see how the opponent was doing, as just having details on how many lines they had completed was dull.

Official Nintendo Magazine ranked Tetris fifth on its list of the "100 Best Nintendo Games". Game Informer's Ben Reeves called it the best Game Boy game and a "legendary puzzle game". In 2019, PC Magazine included the game on their "The 10 Best Game Boy Games" commenting: "Tetris serves up addictive and challenging gameplay on the go for all ages".

In August 2008, Nintendo Power listed Tetris DX as the best Game Boy/Game Boy Color video game, stating that it meant more to handheld gaming than any other video game. They also described it as the best version of Tetris until Tetris DS was released. Alexey Pajitnov called the Game Boy version of Tetris his favorite and very close to his original version. In Japan, Famitsu gave it a score of 26 out of 40.
