= Obitus =

1991 video game

- Amiga cover art
- Developer: Scenario Developments
- Publishers: Psygnosis; Bullet-Proof Software
- Platforms: Amiga, Atari ST, MS-DOS, Super NES
- Release: 1991: Amiga, ST, MS-DOS; 1994: SNES
- Genre: Action-adventure
- Mode: Single-player

Obitus is an action-adventure game developed and released by Psygnosis in early 1991 for Amiga, Atari ST, and MS-DOS compatible operating systems. A version for the Super Nintendo Entertainment System was published in 1994 by Bullet-Proof Software. The game includes both first-person dungeon crawling and side-scrolling gameplay with action-oriented combat and an emphasis on item acquisition.

== Gameplay ==
Screenshot

Obitus combines several graphical styles and perspectives in a labyrinth-based game. Though nearly every piece of a forest or catacomb looks indistinguishable from the next screen, this can be dealt with by the player making physical maps, using the compass. The game is heavily focused on the need to make maps. Without them, the player will die long before making it to the end. There is very little food and time cannot be wasted walking around trying to find a way forward. The player's stamina bar steadily runs out and can only be replenished by sleeping, which can only be done safely beside a friendly NPC. Once the stamina bar is depleted, the player's health begins to deplete.

Obitus can be mistaken for a role-playing game when in actuality it functions like an action-adventure game. Players must traverse the game's mazes, gathering loot, items, weapons, and treasures in search of mystical gems while fighting enemies and avoiding traps. Upon reaching a castle, Obitus changes from first-person perspective to 2D side-scrolling complete with a new jumping ability. However, the game features no RPG-adjacent stats (just a stamina and health bar), no character progression, no experience points, no variable damage, an inventory instead of real equipment, and few other traditional RPG traits. The original box for the game references strategy and adventure but not role-playing.

== Plot ==
The player takes on the role of medieval history lecturer Wil Mason, whose car breaks down while he drives through Snowdonia, Wales in a storm. He seeks refuge in a deserted tower, only to wake up in a strange world.

King Cullen passed control of the peaceful land Obitus to his four sons, warning them to stand united or the land would fall into evil hands. To symbolise the unity, the king gave each of his sons a Gem of Tranquility, which when joined conjured a mystical force to protect the land. Some time after the transfer of power took place, an evil sorceress sought to take advantage of the princes' fraternal pact. She told them each in confidence that they must break from the others in order to obtain personal wealth and power. The princes took these words to heart and fought for control of the kingdom. When the battle was over, each prince had one of the gems and one quarter of the land, and the power of the gems had been broken. Only by reuniting them in the Tower Obitus can the kingdom be saved.

== Reception ==
Allen L. Greenberg of Computer Gaming World liked the no-typing interface, graphics, and sound, but stated that the documentation was so poor that players would be better off not reading it. Despite stating that the game lacked depth, the magazine stated that Obitus "can be a satisfying experience" that "offers many hours of exploration and danger, and plenty to see". David Upchurch of ACE gave the Amiga version a score of 830 (out of a possible 1000), praising the graphics and gameplay, but noting that it may not appeal to hard-core RPG enthusiasts. Electronic Gaming Monthly asserted the reverse in their review of the Super NES version, that the game would appeal to RPG enthusiasts but not those who dislike RPGs. They gave it a 6.4 out of 10, summarizing it as "a slow-moving RPG that will appeal more to patient gamers."

German gaming magazine Amiga Joker gave the Amiga version of Obitus an overall score of 73%, complimenting the 3D graphics and comparing the environment to 1984 ASCII game Beast but "complete with trigger happy enemies and delicate parallax scrolling." In regards to gameplay, Amiga Joker stated "if Obitus were just an action game, the combat sequences would be a bit sparse, but as a change of pace from the puzzles they are very OK ... all in all Obitus isn't the peak of originality, but for an adventure-like game, because of the simple controls, it is a very good experience."

GamePro gave the Super NES version of Obitus four out of five stars, praising its music, controls and UI, and the blending of a classic RPG with side-scrolling action gameplay, stating they "work well together. ... The real-time fighting action is a good adrenaline break in your travels. On its own, though, it's nothing special." Despite this, GamePro goes on to describe Obitus as "unambitious", and criticizes some instances of the game's animation as "stiff", and sound effects as "repetitive".
