= The Twisted Tales of Spike McFang =

1993 video game

- North American box art
- Developer: Red Company
- Publishers: JP: Naxat Soft; NA: Bullet-Proof Software
- Director: Kazuhiko Inoue
- Producers: Masato Toyoshima; Masaki Kobayashi
- Programmers: Yuuichi Ochiai; Daisuke Morishima
- Composer: Hisashi Matsushita
- Platform: Super Nintendo Entertainment System
- Release: JP: March 19, 1993; NA: June 1994
- Genre: Action RPG
- Mode: Single-player

The Twisted Tales of Spike McFang (Japanese: 超魔界大戦！どらぼっちゃん, Hepburn: Chō Makai Taisen! Dorabotchan; lit. "Super Demon-world War! Little Dorabo") is an action role-playing video game developed by Red Company for the Super Nintendo Entertainment System. It was released by Naxat Soft in Japan and by Bullet-Proof Software in North America. The game is the sequel to the TurboGrafx-16 game Makai Prince Dorabotchan, which was only released in Japan. The characters also appeared in the Japanese Super Naxat Open golf game for Super Famicom.

== Plot ==
The game follows the adventures of a young vampire, the title character Spike McFang, who is set to battle with the evil zombie general Von Hesler, who attempts to invade his parents' and his friend Camelia's kingdoms.

== Gameplay ==
The game plays from a top-down perspective; the player encounters several enemies in the game and by defeating them, can gain experience points and increase his level. Spike's main weapons are his cape, that attacks in a short range (though Spike can extend its range at the risk of dizzying himself for a short time) and his hat, which can be thrown like a boomerang. He is also able to utilize magical cards with a wide variety of special effects, including, but not limited to:

- Invisibility
- Summoning angels and bats
- Turning all foes into small, furry animals
- Grabbing a balloon and floating to safety
- Elemental Attacks
- Powered up partner
- Recovering Health

== Regional differences ==
The American release of The Twisted Tales of Spike McFang was slightly altered in relation to the original. The enemies have higher defense and after Spike gains a level, his health does not get replenished. As a result, the game was more challenging than its Japanese counterpart. The shopkeeper, Dowson, was originally a blonde girl. In the American version, this was changed to a mummified creature.

== Reception ==
Reception

Review scores
Publication	Score
Computer and Video Games	79/100
Electronic Gaming Monthly	9/10, 8/10, 8/10, 8/10, 8/10
Famitsu	6/10, 8/10, 8/10, 6/10
Game Informer	8.25/10
Game Players	85%
Official Nintendo Magazine	76/100
RPGFan	82%
Super Play	82%
Electronic Games	B−
Flux	7/10
Marukatsu Super Famicom	6/10, 9/10, 9/10, 9/10
The Super Famicom	68/100
Super Gamer	68/100
VideoGames	5/10

Electronic Gaming Monthly's Mike Weigand complimented the game's scale while but said that the perspective of the game took a while to get used to, particularly the jumping mechanics. Nintendo Power praised the game for its "good graphics" and "entertaining story" while noting that the "adventure tends to take a predetermined path" and that the text scrolls too slowly and that control is frustrating in certain situations. GamePro's Lawrence Neves gave the game a negative review, saying that the simplistic and routine gameplay and storyline make it strictly for beginning gamers. They also criticized the cute tone of the visuals, commenting, "The pleasing graphics are clean and well drawn. On the other hand, so is Barney, and no one wants to see an RPG with him in it."

In 1996, Super Play ranked the game 96th on their Top 100 SNES Games of All Time. They praised the game's originality and the playing card theme gameplay.
