= Tetris Party =

2008 video game

- Developer: Blue Planet Software
- Publishers: JP: Hudson Soft; NA/EU: Tetris Online, Inc.
- Composer: Brian DiLucente
- Series: Tetris
- Platforms: Nintendo DS, Wii
- Release: Tetris Party (Download): JP: October 14, 2008; NA: October 20, 2008; PAL: October 24, 2008; Tetris Party Deluxe (Retail): NA: May 25, 2010; JP: August 5, 2010; EU: September 3, 2010; AU: October 14, 2010; Tetris Party Live (Download): NA: November 22, 2010; PAL: December 3, 2010
- Genre: Puzzle
- Modes: Single-player, multiplayer

Tetris Party (Note: Japanese: テトリスパーティ, Hepburn: Tetorisu Pāti) is a puzzle video game by Hudson Soft for WiiWare. An installment of the Tetris series, the game supports the use of Miis and the Wii Balance Board, and features both local and online multiplayer in addition to several single-player modes unique to the game.

The game was released in Japan on October 14, 2008, in North America on October 20, 2008, and in Europe and Australia on October 24, 2008.

A retail version called Tetris Party Deluxe (Note: Known in Japan as Tetris Party Premium (Japanese: テトリスパーティープレミアム, Hepburn: Tetorisu Pāti Puremiamu)) which was announced by Tetris Online, Inc., Hudson Soft, Nintendo Australia and Majesco, was released in 2010 for the Wii and the Nintendo DS systems. Nintendo handled physical distribution in Europe.

A DSiWare version called Tetris Party Live was released in North America on November 22, 2010, and later in the PAL region on December 3, 2010. This version is no longer available for purchase as of March 31, 2012.

== Game modes ==
Tetris Party introduces a number of new game modes. In addition to the 15-level traditional single player only marathon mode, the single and multiplayer versus modes, and Vs. Hot Lines and Team Battle modes returning from earlier games, as well as the return of Bombliss, these new modes include:

- Beginner's Tetris: The traditional 15-level game with larger blocks, a smaller playfield and new polyominos such as a three-block line, a two-block line and a small three-block L-shape.
- Wii Balance Board Tetris: A variation of Beginner's Tetris in which players control falling Tetriminos using the Balance Board, leaning left and right to move the Tetrimino, leaning forward or backward to drop it, and squatting to rotate it in a clockwise direction. This game type also includes a 3-minute high-score mode called "Balance Ultra" and a Vs. Computer battle mode.
- Co-op Tetris: Two players work together simultaneously on a double size playfield to clear lines.
- Field Climber: The player builds layers of blocks to help a tiny man reach the top of the screen. The mode is time-based, and also available in online versus play.
- Shadow: Players must race to fill in a background image with Tetriminos, while not allowing any pieces to lie outside of the puzzle in the process. This mode features new Tetrimino shapes and a total of 30 puzzles.
- Stage Racer: The player guides a single Tetrimino downward through a narrow twisting passage, being sure not to get it caught on the sides.
- Dual Spaces: A Reversi-inspired mode where players section off empty space, and gain points for every empty space they lockout by placing their Tetriminos to create larger areas of their own color.

The multiplayer versus modes support up to four players offline and six players online through the Nintendo Wi-Fi Connection and feature new powerups that utilize the pointer and motion functions of the Wii Remote. The game also keeps skill charts and statistics and features online leaderboards and more than 130 achievements for players to monitor their progress.

The game does not include any multiplayer marathon modes. Garbage is not optional in multiplayer mode as it was in The New Tetris.

=== Tournament play ===
Both Hudson and Tetris Online have organized tournaments for players of the game, with the first held in December 2008. Each tournament involves the different game modes in Tetris Party, with the first and third tournaments featuring four rounds with four different game modes contested in each.

There was a total of four tournaments where the top 500 in the first and third tournaments and top 100 in the second and fourth tournaments would be credited with 1,200 Nintendo points to use for either the Wii Shop or DSiWare Shop.

== Reception ==
=== Tetris Party ===
Tetris Party

Aggregate score
Aggregator	Score
Metacritic	86/100

Review scores
Publication	Score
GamePro	4/5
IGN	9/10
NGamer	80%
Nintendo Life	8/10
Official Nintendo Magazine	91%

Tetris Party received "generally favorable reviews" according to the review aggregation website Metacritic. IGN called it "the best console version [of Tetris] we've seen in years" and a "must buy", though they were slightly disappointed in the somewhat limited online multiplayer. Nintendo Life praised the online play in general and called it "the most robust online Tetris experience money can buy" next to Tetris DS, though they were also disappointed in the limited online play modes and felt the game is geared more towards local multiplayer than for solo players. Official Nintendo Magazine was very impressed by the "addictive online play" and commented on the "great variety of modes". They also loved the "classic Tetris gameplay" and thought it was "good value for your points." However, they did mark it down as they thought the "Balance Board mode was a bit gimmicky."

The game was nominated for multiple Wii-specific awards by IGN in its 2008 video game awards, including Best WiiWare Game and Best Puzzle Game.

=== Tetris Party Deluxe ===
Tetris Party Deluxe

Aggregate score
Aggregator	Score	
Aggregator	DS	Wii
Metacritic	76/100	72/100

Review scores
Publication	Score	
Publication	DS	Wii
Famitsu	29/40	29/40
GameSpot	7/10	7/10
GamesRadar+	N/A	3.5/5
IGN	N/A	7.5/10
NGamer	70%	N/A
Nintendo Power	8.5/10	N/A
Official Nintendo Magazine	73%	N/A
PALGN	7/10	7/10
Metro	N/A	7/10

The DS version of Tetris Party Deluxe received "generally favorable reviews", while the Wii version received "average" reviews, according to Metacritic. In Japan, Famitsu gave it a score of one eight and three sevens for the DS version, and one eight, one six, one seven, and one eight for the Wii version.

=== Tetris Party Live ===
Tetris Party Live

Aggregate score
Aggregator	Score
Metacritic	74/100

Review scores
Publication	Score
GamesRadar+	3.5/5
Nintendo Life	8/10
Official Nintendo Magazine	78%

At the time of release, Tetris Party Live received "average" reviews according to Metacritic.
