= The Next Tetris =

1999 video game

- European Dreamcast box art
- Developers: Blue Planet Software; Animatek
- Publishers: Hasbro Interactive (PlayStation, Nuon); Bullet-Proof Software (Japanese version); Crave Entertainment (Dreamcast)
- Series: Tetris
- Platforms: PlayStation, PC, Dreamcast, Nuon
- Release: PlayStation: NA: June 16, 1999; Dreamcast: NA: December 19, 2000; EU: May 4, 2001; Nuon: WW: 2001
- Genre: Puzzle
- Modes: Single-player, multiplayer

The Next Tetris is a puzzle video game in the Tetris series, developed by Blue Planet Software. The game was originally released for the PlayStation by Hasbro Interactive on June 16, 1999. In 2000, a version for the Dreamcast called The Next Tetris: On-Line Edition, which included online multiplayer, was published by Crave Entertainment in the United States. The Dreamcast version was released in Europe the following year with online functionality removed. A version was also included with Toshiba-manufactured DVD players using the interactive Nuon technology.

== Gameplay ==
The game features two modes. "Classic Tetris" has gameplay fundamentally unchanged from the earliest in the series, and is only playable in single-player.

In "The Next Tetris" mode, the familiar tetromino pieces consist of different colored blocks called "multiminoes". If a block is multi-colored and placed with a gap below the piece, then the colored squares will separate and drop into the space below. This "cascading" feature allows players to drop blocks down after initially making a horizontal line disappear, allowing for larger combos. The Next Tetris mode is playable in single-player, two-player, and online in the North American Dreamcast release only.

== Development ==
The game was developed in 15 months.

== Reception ==
The Next Tetris received a score of 6.5/10 in IGN, while the Dreamcast version scored 8/10. Reviewing the latter, IGN's Anthony Chau described the new cascading gameplay as "an interesting play mechanic" and praised the "industrial-like menu presentation" and "trancy, dreamy melodies" of the soundtrack. Official Dreamcast Magazine's Alex Huhtala dismissed the game as "a poorly conceived and executed version of a classic", pointing to "sluggish controls" and "gameplay tweaks [compared to the original Tetris] that make it too easy". The Next Tetris mode was described as a "novel idea" by Ryan Davis of GameSpot but he argued that "instead of making players take on new strategies, it tends to encourage a barrage of sloppy bricklaying".
