= Tetris Splash =

2007 video game

- Cover art with logo designed by Roger Dean
- Developer: Tetris Online, Inc.
- Publisher: Microsoft Game Studios
- Composer: Brian DiLucente
- Series: Tetris
- Platform: Xbox 360
- Release: October 3, 2007
- Genre: Puzzle
- Modes: Single-player, multiplayer

Tetris Splash is a puzzle video game. Part of the wider Tetris franchise, the game was published by Microsoft Game Studios for the Xbox 360 via Xbox Live Arcade. It was the first game produced by Tetris Online, Inc.

The game is named after the aquarium-styled theme of the game. Tetris Splash was released on the Xbox Live Arcade on October 3, 2007. It received mixed reviews from critics.

== Gameplay ==
The game is typical Tetris gameplay, with support for up to six players in online multiplayer, and up to four players in same-machine multiplayer. Multiplayer includes team play as well (i.e. 3 teams of 2, designated "Red", "Green" and "Blue" teams.) Gameplay follows the trend of rewarding T-Spins, but also adds a new element of combos, where multiple consecutive pieces each clear lines with no "non-line clearing" pieces in between.

== Game modes ==
There are several game modes available.

=== Single player ===
- Marathon: Similar to Classic Tetris game play. Goes up to level 15.
- 40 Lines: Clear 40 lines as fast as possible. Known as "Sprint" in many other official releases.

=== Multiplayer ===
- Same machine: Up to four players. Last survivor wins.
- Online ranked: Six player free-for-all, playing for TrueSkill ranking.
- Online unranked: Allows customization, including Team Mode, in which teams play against each other, instead of free-for-all.

== Screensaver ==
The game also includes an aquarium screensaver, which the user can personalize. Initially, the game comes with the option to make the tank a fresh water or salt water tank. Only two types of fish come with the main game: goldfish (for the fresh water tank) and clownfish (for the salt water tank).

On first day of release, nine downloadable fish bundles were offered, which included Marine Angelfish, Guppy, Triggerfish, Tetra, Tang, Discus, Butterflyfish, Arowana, and Angelfish to add to the tank. Four decor packs were also offered, which included a Scuba theme, a Pirate theme, a Graveyard theme, and an Atlantis theme to add objects to the tank.

== Reception ==
Reception

Aggregate score
Aggregator	Score
Metacritic	53/100

Review scores
Publication	Score
Eurogamer	3/10
GamePro	1.5/5
GameSpot	5.5/10
IGN	6/10
Official Xbox Magazine (UK)	4/10
Official Xbox Magazine (US)	7/10
PALGN	7/10
TeamXbox	6.5/10

The game received "mixed" reviews according to the review aggregation website Metacritic.
