= Tetris Friends =

2009 video game

- Developer: Tetris Online, Inc.
- Composer: Brian DiLucente
- Series: Tetris
- Platforms: Windows, Mac OS X, Linux
- Release: November 21, 2008
- Genre: Puzzle
- Modes: Single player, multiplayer

Tetris Friends was an online Tetris game developed by Tetris Online, Inc. Registered users were able to compare their scores with their friends and with the entire community. It was the only official Flash implementation of Tetris made by the Tetris company itself. At the time, it was also the only official Tetris platform that had advertisements play before a match. Tetris Friends had over a million registered users.

Tetris Friends featured six single-player modes and five multiplayer modes. Playing any game mode gave a user Tokens. They could be used to unlock new skins and Tetrimino styles, although a premium "ruby" currency also existed. The version available on Facebook only had four of the modes available on the official website and contained had no coin system, but featured a special mode.

All game modes except Tetris 1989 and N-Blox used the SRS rotational system, featured the hold function which allowed players to save a block for future use, and had a quad-Tetrimino preview that allows players to see the next few upcoming blocks.

Tetris Online, Inc ceased all operations on May 30, 2019. As such, Tetris Friends permanently shut down on that date.

== Game Modes ==
=== Single Player ===
==== Marathon ====
In Marathon Mode, players have to clear a specified number of lines while trying to score as many points as possible. Clearing multiple lines with one piece is worth more than the actual number cleared. For instance, clearing a single line is worth only one, while clearing four lines with a single piece is worth eight lines. Once the goal has been reached, the level and speed increases and a new, higher goal is set. There are fifteen levels in total. The game ends once level fifteen is completed, and the score is recorded and added to the high score list if the user has a registered account.

==== Sprint ====
Sprint Mode requires players to clear forty lines as quickly as possible. The time required to clear all the lines is recorded as the score. The speed is automatically set to the lowest setting.

==== Ultra ====
Ultra Mode challenges players to score as many points as possible in two minutes. Clearing multiple lines with a single piece scores more points. Special moves called t-spins are also worth extra points. If the player loses by reaching the top, the score does not count and is not recorded in the high score list.

==== Survival ====
Survival Mode is similar to Marathon Mode. Players have to clear ten lines per level while scoring as many points as possible. Every line cleared is worth only one, unlike in Marathon Mode. There are a total of twenty levels, each one at a higher speed than the last. Once all twenty levels are beaten, the player enters the bonus level. The bonus level is a semi-invisible level. Blocks alternate between being visible and invisible. The blocks are invisible for increasing longer time periods as the level progresses. There is no limit on how many lines the player can clear, and the player only loses when the blocks reach the top of the field. This game mode is not available on the Facebook version.

==== Tetris 1989 ====
This mode attempts to simulate the classic Game Boy version of Tetris. There are two modes within this game. Mode A challenges players to clear as many lines as possible. Once certain goals are reached, the speed increases. Mode B requires players to clear a specified number of lines. These are similar to other game modes, but the rotational system of the blocks is slightly different, and there is no hold feature, making this mode more difficult. This game mode is not available on the Facebook version.

==== N-Blox ====
N-Blox mode is developed by British web designer Paul Neave. It does not use many of the new features such as the hold function and the four block preview. Players are also not allowed to change the keyboard controls, which they can in every other mode. The goal is to score as many points as possible. The speed increases after a certain number of lines are cleared. This is similar to other standard Tetris modes available in other games. This mode is not available on the Facebook version. It is still available for play on a dedicated site, despite the shutdown of Tetris Friends.

==== BlockStar ====
This mode is similar to the N-Blox and Tetris 1989 modes. There are no hold pieces, ghost pieces, or four piece preview. The game is endless and challenges players to achieve the high score. This game is a remake of the first Tetris game that was released on Facebook. It is only available to play on Facebook, and is not found on the Tetris Friends website.

=== Multiplayer ===
==== Battle 2P ====
In Battle 2P, the player plays against a recorded game previously played by the player or any other player. The goal is to knock out the other player three times by forcing them to reach the top of the screen. Players can send garbage, blank lines of tiles that cannot be cleared normally, to the other player by clearing multiple lines with a single piece, by clearing lines with consecutive pieces, or by performing the t-spin manoeuvre. There is a two-minute time limit. If no one has won by the end of two minutes, the player that has been knocked out the most times loses. If both have the same number of knock-outs, then the player that sent the most lines of garbage to the other player is the winner. Players earn stars when they win. Once enough stars have been earned, the player is promoted to the next rank and matched up with better players. There are a total of twenty ranks attainable.

==== Battle 6P ====
This mode is very similar to Battle 2P. The player is pitted against five other opponents. The opposing players are also recordings as in Battle 2P. There is a target that constantly alternates between the other five players. When garbage is sent by the player, the person that the target is current pointing at is the one that receives the garbage. Knock-outs are awarded to the person that sent the most garbage to the knocked-out player, so timing of attacks is important in earning knock-outs. The player with the highest knock-out-to-knocked-out ratio after two minutes is the winner. If that is tied, then number of lines of garbage sent is the tie-breaker, as in Battle 2P. By doing well, the players can earn stars, which promotes them to new ranks. Doing poorly will cause players to lose stars. As in Battle 2P, there are twenty ranks in the mode. This mode is not available on the Facebook version.

==== Sprint 5P ====
In Sprint 5P, the player plays against four others players in the basic Sprint Mode. The players are previously recorded as in Battle 2P. The goal is to clear forty lines before the other players. Players earn stars by placing first or second, and they lose stars by placing fourth of fifth. Once enough stars are earned, they advance to a new rank just as in Battle 2P.

==== Arena ====
Arena is the only live multiplayer mode. It pits up to six players against each other in real time. It works similarly to Battle 6P, except that when a player is knocked out, they are out of that round.

Arena is the only mode with holes in its garbage (think of Tetris 99 and Puyo Puyo Tetris's garbage). There are also unclearable lines, according to Tetris wiki, "After 90-150 seconds, each player begins to receive one line of garbage every 3 seconds. Garbage given to you this way has no gaps at all and is unclearable."

There is an in game chat where the player can chat with their opponents any time. There is also an automated message, in the chat, highlighted green, whenever someone leaves or enters a room or when someone is KO'd.

There are also items available in the game. When special flashing blocks (Tetriminoes with one of the minos containing a question mark) are cleared, the player is awarded with a randomly selected item that harms the opponent in some way. It is stored in the item queue and the activates when player presses v (the player can change controls in setting which means for some players, they press another button instead of v). Items can cause more garbage, speed up the game for the opponent, or even make the blocks invisible, among other things.

There are also maps, a preset board full of minos set in a specific shape. (available in room creation)

The player would create or join a room in order to play.

When joining a room, they can pick from a list of rooms listed in the middle of the screen. The room banner would include; room name, maps, items, rank, number of players (currently in the room), and spectators (currently in the room). Below that is a line of dots, each dot representing a player in the room, the dots would have colors depending on their rank (ex: silver color for silver rank). To the right of that is the button to watch (spectate) and button to join (play). Some times, the room banner would also have the word "HOT" in bold red with a fire symbol to the top right of the banner if the room has been doing well.

To the top right would be a big green button called "quick play". Which boots the player into an already made room with players or if there are no rooms available, it boots the player into a default room with no one. From top down is; "quick play", "create room", "hide room list", and "friends online"

There is also a button at the top right of the frame called, "change list". When clicked, the player would get a list. It shows the list of classes, and whether you can play or watch. Players that are ranked above a class can play in that class. They cannot play against classes above them. In the list, there is a dot with the color of the class and the class name which include, "bronze class", "silver class", "gold class", "platinum class", "non ranked", and "hot to watch". Non ranked is available to all players no matter their class.

To the right of "change list" button is the class that all the rooms available are (ex: if the class says bronze, every room available below would be bronze) (can be changed with change list), how many rooms are available currently in that class, and filter and refresh button

filter button when pressed would be given many options. At the very top would be the option to "only show room with friends" and "hide full rooms". Below that is the filter the "number of players" (if you want to only see rooms with 2 players, click 2), the options goes from "any", 1 to 6. Below that is filter "map settings", options include; "any", "none", "classic", "combo", and "t-spin". Below that is "item settings", options include; "any", "none", "party", and "basic". Below that is "extra options", which include; "any", "expert", "team mode", "no spectators", and "no new comers". Below that is the button called, "quick play based on these filters" (which means the quick play button will use those filters). Below that are 3 buttons, "default settings", "accept", and "cancel"

When creating a room, the player would click on "create room" and a screen of options would appear, they can have a random room name by clicking the rotation button, or they can choose from a list of words to build a 3 word long room name. Options in room creation include; room name, number of players (2-6), map settings, item settings, and background image. On the right side, there are more options including; make private and non ranked. Below that are more options that must be unlocked with rubies which include; team mode, no spectators, no new comers, and no solid garbage. There is also the option of Expert and Expert + in room creation (which lies below the no solid garbage option). According to Harddrop wiki, "After progressing beyond the silver class, the option of Expert Mode and Expert Mode + become available when making a room. A Purple E or E+ in the upper right of a game room will indicate the mode. It is highly advised that all games be played in Expert + mode."

When the player is waiting (for players to join the room or for the round to end), they have the option to practice. A button would pop up, called "practice" and when pressed, they can play solo Tetris.

During the game, there is a target sign on an opponent's board which indicates who the player is attacking. The sign has a loading animation and changes target every time the animation goes down.

If lost, the player gets shown a message, on their board, telling them how long they lasted that round, "your game time: ___" and who KO'd them and, the option to practice.

Players can also choose to not play the next round by pressing a button called, "sit out next match" at the bottom right corner

After each round, a banner includes a list of all the players would show their "rank change" (how much points they earned/lost), KOs, and lines sent. Then another banner would appear, showing their total wins, consecutive wins, and matches played. After both banners, the next game starts.

The player is awarded points based on how well they do, how many lines of garbage they sent, and how many people they knocked out. Once a player earns 1,000 points, they are promoted to the next rank. If their points reach 0 because they lost points in a match, they are demoted a rank. This mode is not available on the Facebook version.

==== Rally 8P ====
In Rally 8P, the player has to race to the bottom of the field by clearing all the blocks. The player has to race against seven other previously recorded players. The mode features cascade rules, which allows blocks to fall all the way down if the blocks below them are removed. Items are also available in this mode as in Arena. Wins earn stars, which allow promotion like most of the other multiplayer modes. This mode is not available on the Facebook version.

== Reception ==
Tetris Friends met with positive reviews overall. PC Review gave it a 4.0/5, stating that "Gameplay is smooth and the Web site is set up cleanly and very easy to navigate. It's simple, but effective." It received an average score of 4.7/5 with over 100 reviews at Jay Is Games.

== Shutdown ==
On April 25, 2019, a banner appeared on the homepage of Tetris Friends stating that "Tetris Friends will no longer be available after May 31st, 2019." This coincided with the shutdown of Tetris Online, Inc (the platform's parent company). Around this time, the platform made all customization options free for all players. On May 31, 2019, Tetris Friends permanently shut down alongside Tetris Online, Inc.

An unofficial recreation of Tetris Friends, known as Notris Foes, is playable whilst being currently in development.
