= Tetris Online, Inc. =

American online video game developer (2006–2019)

- Industry: Video Games, Interactive entertainment
- Founded: January 2006; 20 years ago
- Founders: Minoru Arakawa; Alexey Pajitnov; Henk Rogers
- Defunct: May 31, 2019; 7 years ago
- Fate: Defunct
- Headquarters: Honolulu, Hawaii, U.S.
- Products: Seeㅤ§ Games.
- Services: Video game developer and publisher
- Website: tetrisonline.com

Tetris Online, Inc. (Russian: Тетрис Онлайн, Инк.) was an American video game developer and publisher. The company was the exclusive online licensee of Tetris in North America and Europe. It was founded in January 2006 by Nintendo of America founder and former president Minoru Arakawa, video game designer and publisher Henk Rogers and Tetris creator Alexey Pajitnov. Tetris Online, Inc. is the developer of social games Tetris Battle and Tetris Friends. In March 2013, Tetris Online, Inc. laid off 40% of its staff.

The company ceased all operations on May 31, 2019. Along with this shutdown, Tetris Friends also ceased all operations.

== Games ==
Tetris Online, Inc. developed and published the following games for consoles, handheld devices, online, and download from its inception in 2006 to its shutdown in 2019.

Game	Year	Platform
Tetris Splash	2007	Xbox Live Arcade
Tetris Battle	2008	Facebook
Tetris Party	2008	Wii
Tetris Friends	2009	Online (Note: Seeㅤ§ External links.)
Tetris Party Deluxe	2010	Nintendo DS, Wii
Feevo	2010	Facebook
Lost Trails	2010	Facebook
Monster Fantasy	2010	Facebook
Tetris Party Live	2010	Nintendo DSi
Home Team Baseball	2011	Facebook
Monster Fusion	2011	Facebook
Feevo HD	2011	iOS
Feevo Blaze	2011	Facebook
Tetris Stars	2011	Facebook
Tetris: Axis	2011	Nintendo 3DS
Tetris Battle	2012	Online
Tetris Battle Fusion	2014	Amazon Fire TV, Ouya
