= Tetris DS =

2006 video game

- North American packaging artwork
- Developer: Nintendo SPD
- Publisher: Nintendo
- Director: Masaki Tawara
- Producer: Hitoshi Yamagami
- Designers: Takao Nakano; Kazuki Yoshihara
- Programmers: Kazuki Yoshihara; Masahiro Kawano
- Artists: Tomoyoshi Yamane; Naoko Okamoto; Yukio Mishima
- Writers: Shuici Narusawa; Kazuhiro Yoshikawa
- Composers: Minako Hamano; Akira Fujiwara
- Series: Tetris
- Platform: Nintendo DS
- Release: NA: March 20, 2006; AU: April 13, 2006; EU: April 21, 2006; JP: April 27, 2006
- Genre: Puzzle
- Modes: Single-player, multiplayer

Tetris DS (Note: Japanese: テトリスDS, Hepburn: Tetorisu Dī Esu) is a puzzle video game developed and published by Nintendo. It was released for the Nintendo DS on March 20, 2006, in North America, April 13, 2006, in Australia, April 21, 2006, in Europe, and April 27, 2006, in Japan. An installment of the Tetris franchise, the game supports up to ten players locally, and supported online multiplayer of up to four players using Nintendo Wi-Fi Connection prior to its discontinuation.

Tetris DS features several new modes of play, each with a different theme styled after retro Nintendo games. They include Super Mario Bros., The Legend of Zelda, Metroid, Donkey Kong, Balloon Fight, and Yoshi's Cookie. Multiplayer gameplay also incorporates items to be used competitively. The game received positive reviews from critics, who cited its additional game modes and multiplayer capabilities. Long after its release, it continued to be upheld as the best portable Tetris title, and one of the best in the series.

== Gameplay ==
The game's standard mode, featuring a scene from Super Mario Bros. on the top screen

The game is split into six unique single-player modes, some of which are usable in the game's multiplayer. Each game variant is represented by a different Nintendo theme and character from a retro game, with the Super Mario Bros. sub-series featured in the game's standard, default mode, while other series appear in the alternate modes that provide a different spin on gameplay.

The game's standard mode plays in a similar manner as classic Tetris, in which the player must move clusters of different-shaped tiles (tetrominos), manipulate them as they drop by spinning them, and place them in a pile at the bottom. Players must stack each piece without empty space so that they can continue clearing lines of the pile. Difficulty of this mode increases with every 10 lines cleared.

The game makes use of the infinite spin feature that was initially introduced in Tetris Worlds, allowing the player to prevent a piece from being locked as long as it continues to spin.

The Zelda-themed Mission mode features changing goals that appear in the top-right of the top screen; sometimes, only certain pieces can fall depending on what goal is active. A "hold" box allows the player to save a piece for later use.

Push mode is a competitive two-player game, where the objective is to push the opponent's pieces towards the bottom of the screen. The player always controls the top screen and must clear two or more lines to shift the block down towards their opponent. If the block is pushed all the way towards the opponent, the player wins; clearing more lines shifts the block more drastically.

Touch mode consists of two variants; Tower mode and Touch Puzzle mode. The former stacks pieces in a disorganized tower, and the player must attempt to get the box of balloons at the top to the bottom by touching and sliding the pieces, or double-tapping them to rotate. The latter contains 50 puzzles ranging in difficulty that must be solved by sliding pieces with the stylus, without rotating them.

In Catch mode, which is themed after Metroid, the player controls a rotating block of pieces that can catch other falling pieces. The central core will detonate once the player achieves a 4×4 block. If enough pieces fall to the bottom without being caught, the player will lose all their energy.

Puzzle mode contains 200 puzzles, ranging from requiring three to five pieces to solve. The pieces must be selected in the proper combination, and rotated the right way to solve the puzzle by clearing all blocks. While the top screen displays the puzzle board, the bottom screen displays the pieces.

The game's multiplayer features player-versus-player basic Tetris, competition Tetris with unique items for up to 10 players locally, and Push mode. Two and four-player competitions could be played over Nintendo Wi-Fi Connection before it was shut down, either using a friend code or searching for random players in Worldwide mode, but can only currently be played using a homebrew server. Additionally, the various modes can be played from a single cartridge using Download Play.

== Development and release ==
Tetris DS was first announced on January 10, 2006. It was first released on March 20, 2006, in North America, with releases worldwide following on April 13, 2006, for Australia, April 21, 2006, for Europe, and April 27, 2006, for Japan.

The rights for Nintendo to make a Tetris game were licensed by The Tetris Company. In an interview, an owner of the company, Henk Rogers, stated that he believed that with Tetris DS, Nintendo would both "move Tetris forward" as well as make money. Also stating that Nintendo was given a great deal of creative freedom in designing the game, he called the game's producer, Hitoshi Yamagami, "one of the smartest game designers I know". Saying that he had "complete confidence in him", Rogers confirmed that there had been no issues combining Nintendo properties and characters with Tetris.

Rogers cited Mission and Tower modes as interesting to him because they were unlike anything done before in Tetris. He stated that the inclusion of the "infinite spin" feature in games such as Tetris DS was done so that games could progress to faster action more quickly without becoming overly difficult, since people had less time to play while on the go. Saying that he believed a sequel on DS was not necessary due to the game's "solid play", he said that his only complaint about the game was that its online mode was "uneven" in its matchmaking.

To promote the game in Japan, Nintendo held an event in August 2006 in which 30 people with Club Nintendo memberships were selected to play against singer Hikaru Utada, who won most of the matches.

In 2016, The Cutting Room Floor discovered and released a prototype for Tetris DS developed by Tose Software originally to be published by THQ, but cancelled in favor of Nintendo's version. THQ had been working on the game since late 2004, but was prevented from releasing the game in March 2005 by The Tetris Company, causing THQ to file a legal complaint against the company alleging a breach of its license agreement. The legal dispute was later settled.

== Reception ==
Reception

Aggregate score
| Aggregator | Score |
|---|---|
| Metacritic | 84/100 |

Review scores
| Publication | Score |
|---|---|
| Computer Games Magazine | 3/5 |
| Edge | 7/10 |
| Electronic Gaming Monthly | 7.5/10, 7/10, 9/10 |
| Eurogamer | 8/10 |
| Famitsu | 9/10, 9/10, 9/10, 8/10 |
| Game Informer | 9.25/10 |
| GamePro | 5/5 |
| GameRevolution | B− |
| GameSpot | 7.5/10 |
| GameSpy | 4.5/5 |
| GameTrailers | 9/10 |
| GameZone | 9/10 |
| IGN | 9/10 |
| Nintendo Power | 9.5/10 |
| Pocket Gamer | 4.5/5 |
| The Sydney Morning Herald | 3.5/5 |
| The Times | 3/5 |

Tetris DS received "generally favorable reviews" according to review aggregation website Metacritic.

Several publications gave the game very high or perfect scores. GamePro rated the game 5/5 stars, praising the game's large variety of modes, and calling it "an amazing puzzle package, and [...] easily one of the best DS games to date". Nintendo Power gave the game a rating of 9.5/10, stating that "you may not love all of it, but you will love much of it". Game Informer rated the game 9.25/10, calling it an "excellent reinvention of one of gaming's greatest titles". Pocket Gamer UK rated the game 4.5/5 stars, saying it was a "must-buy", although commenting that "zealots" may call the game too easy. 4Players rated it 90/100, calling it "next to Meteos the most important puzzler of modern times". Famitsu gave it a score of two nines, one eight, and one nine for a total of 35 out of 40.

More mixed reviews included that of Ryan Davis of GameSpot, who rated the game 7.5/10. In his review, he said that while the game was much better than other recent versions, it also made "enough minor, obvious mistakes to keep it from becoming essential", calling it "saddled with some unfortunate compromises". The A.V. Club gave it a B+, praising the game's modes as "innovative", but criticizing the game's online, where "dedicated fanboys [...] will eat newbies for breakfast". The Sydney Morning Herald rated the game 3.5/5 stars, calling multiplayer the game's best addition, but suggesting purists would not like changes such as the hold box and infinite spin. The Times also rated the game 3.5/5 stars, calling the game "a little too retro to be anything other than a game to play in short bursts".

=== Sales ===
By August 1, 2006, Tetris DS was close to going platinum in Japan, with more than 800,000 units sold. By July 25, 2007, the game had sold 2.05 million copies worldwide.

=== Awards ===
- GameSpy: #2 Nintendo DS Game of the Year
- IGN: Editors' Choice Award

=== Legacy ===
In the years following the game's release, English copies of the game became rare and difficult to find due to its popularity in the West, leading many to purchase more plentiful Japanese-language copies.

Long after its release, Tetris DS continues to be held in high regard by critics as one of the best Tetris games ever made. In 2011, Stephen Totilo of Kotaku compared Tetris: Axis to Tetris DS, finding the latter significantly better and recommending people play it instead. In a 2018 retrospective, John Linneman of Digital Foundry called the game the third-best in the series after Tetris Effect and Tetris: The Grand Master 3 - Terror Instinct, as well as the best portable Tetris game. Christian Donlan, also of Eurogamer, stated in 2020 that his DS was "largely still active" due to the game, calling the series the "final boss of video game consoles".
