= Vadim Gerasimov =

Russian software engineer

Vadim Viktorovich Gerasimov (Russian: Вадим Викторович Герасимов) is an engineer at Google. From 1994 to 2003, Gerasimov worked and studied at the MIT Media Lab. Gerasimov earned a BS/MS in applied mathematics from Moscow State University in 1992 and a Ph.D. from MIT in 2003.

At age 16 he was one of the original co-developers of the famous video game Tetris: he ported Alexey Pajitnov's original game to the IBM PC architecture and the two later added features to the game.
