= Tetris (Electronic Arts) =

2008 video game

- iOS icon
- Developer(s): EA Mobile
- Publisher(s): Electronic Arts
- Series: Tetris
- Platform(s): iOS, Android, BlackBerry OS, Windows Phone
- Release: iOS; July 11, 2008; BlackBerry OS; August 24, 2009; Windows Phone; October 21, 2010; Android; September 1, 2011
- Genre(s): Puzzle
- Mode(s): Single-player

Tetris was a puzzle video game developed by EA Mobile and published by Electronic Arts for iOS, Android, BlackBerry OS, and Windows Phone. The game featured gameplay like other Tetris titles, with a new soundtrack. It was discontinued and rendered inoperative in 2020 after EA's license expired.

== Gameplay ==
After completing level 15, Magic mode is completed.

Gameplay was nearly identical in gameplay to other Tetris titles, but with a new soundtrack. Players also had the ability to create their own soundtrack for the game using the music library of the iPhone or iPod Touch device on which the game is being played. The game offered two modes of play dubbed "Marathon" mode and "Magic" mode.

=== Marathon ===
Marathon mode is the classic version of Tetris, where a point system along with number of lines cleared were kept as indicators of progress. The level of speed was chosen prior to starting the mode of gameplay. There were 15 levels total, and like Magic mode, this mode ends after all 15 levels have been completed. Unlike the original version of Tetris, Marathon mode ends after clearing 150 lines. Once Marathon mode ends, the Endless feature becomes unlocked.

=== Magic ===
Magic mode was an enhanced version of gameplay, where there are fifteen levels of difficulty. Each level of difficulty is incremented by speed and number of lines required to clear the level. Once the number of lines required to clear the level are met, the next level is presented. Upon failure of a level, the game offers players to retry an unlimited number of times. The game allows for pausing of gameplay, which is automatic when a player receives a phone call on an iPhone device. Another element of gameplay in Magic mode is the addition of helper objects that are retrieved throughout levels, which allow players to make minor edits to the puzzle. The special objects become available in the first five levels, and then remain generating upon lines completed and tetriminos placed. There are five special objects, ranging from a magic crayon to blocks converting to bubble popping status.

== History ==
On December 1, 2011, the iOS version of the game was replaced with a new version, which came with an additional "Marathon One Touch Mode" as well as a paid subscription which comes with discounts and premium content.

In January 2020, EA announced that they would retire their mobile version of the game on April 21, 2020, and the game became unplayable after this date, even if the full version was purchased. The Tetris Company instead licensed the rights to N3TWORK to create a new mobile version.

== Reception ==
Reception

Aggregate scores
Aggregator	Score
GameRankings	iOS: 69%
Metacritic	iOS (2011): 65/100 iOS (iPad): 76/100

EA Mobile's 2011 release of Tetris received heavy criticism for being "needlessly cumbersome" in terms of touch controls, and missing (online) multiplayer options were seen as no longer up to current times.

By 2010, the game, along with other Tetris mobile versions, reached 100 million paid downloads. The number increased to 132 million a year later.
