= Tetris: The Grand Master =

Video game series

- Arcade flyer for the first game in the series
- Genre: Puzzle
- Developer: Arika
- Publishers: Capcom (Note: Tetris: The Grand Master); Psikyo (Note: Tetris: The Absolute – The Grand Master 2); Taito (Note: Tetris: The Grand Master 3 – Terror-Instinct); AQ Interactive (Note: Tetris: The Grand Master Ace)
- Composers: Shinji Hosoe; Ayako Saso
- Platforms: Arcade; Xbox 360; Nintendo Switch (Note: Tetris: The Grand Master 4 – Absolute Eye); Microsoft Windows
- Original release: 1998; 2000; 2005; 2025
- First release: Tetris: The Grand Master
- Latest release: Tetris: The Grand Master 4 – Absolute Eye
- Parent series: Tetris

Tetris: The Grand Master (Note: Japanese: テトリス ザ・グランドマスター, Hepburn: Tetorisu: Za Gurando Masutā) is a series of puzzle arcade video games developed by Arika. It is a spin-off and a competitive variant of Tetris, following the dan ranking system with increasing levels of speed.

== Gameplay ==
The basic gameplay of Tetris: The Grand Master is similar to that of other Tetris games. The player must move and rotate tetromino-shaped pieces falling into a well to form horizontal lines, which will then be cleared. During gameplay, the game automatically gives ranks to the player according to their score, starting from 9 up to Grand Master (GM), roughly following the dan ranking system. The game speeds up rapidly, eventually reaching instant gravity, where blocks appear immediately at the bottom, and upwards of three tetrominoes per second.

Tetris: The Grand Master's gameplay is heavily inspired by Sega's Japanese arcade version of Tetris, released 10 years earlier. It uses a modified version of that game's rotation system, the same color scheme for tetrominoes, and relies heavily on mechanics such as lock delay, similar to Sega's game.

The main goal in Tetris: The Grand Master is to score points, awarding the player a higher grade. The game ends when a player reaches level 999. If the player scored enough points, they will be awarded with the grade S9. To achieve the grade GM, the player must also meet some time requirements during play. If the player tops out before reaching level 999, the game ends, awarding the player the current grade and its "mastering time", the time at which the grade was awarded during gameplay.

== Games ==
=== Tetris: The Grand Master ===
Tetris: The Grand Master was released in Japanese arcades in August 1998. A port to the PlayStation was in development in 1999, but was cancelled due to a decision by The Tetris Company.

On November 1, 2021, Arika vice-president Ichiro Mihara posted on Twitter that a formal announcement for the upcoming release of a home port of the Tetris: The Grand Master series was being delayed, thus revealing that a home port for the series was currently in development. Hamster Corporation released the game as part of their Arcade Archives series for the Nintendo Switch and PlayStation 4 in December 2022, which was revealed following a notice by Arika of the delay of a formal announcement.

=== Tetris: The Absolute – The Grand Master 2 ===
Tetris: The Absolute – The Grand Master 2 was released in 2000, and added additional modes of play. One of these new modes is the Master mode, which extends the classic Tetris: The Grand Master gameplay with larger speed increases, more requirements to achieve the M or GM grades, and an additional challenge when the M rank is achieved where the player must survive the credits roll with the additional handicap of the tetrominoes turning invisible upon locking. Additional modes include a more casual Normal mode, a Versus mode enhanced with item battles, and a two-player co-op mode.

An update, Tetris: The Absolute – The Grand Master 2 Plus, added additional modes such as "TGM+", which adds rising garbage blocks to the game field, and "T.A. Death" where the game begins at 20G (maximum gravity where blocks appear at the bottom instantly) and every other aspect of the game also speeds up steadily.

Hamster Corporation also released the Plus version as part of their Arcade Archives series for the Nintendo Switch and PlayStation 4 on June 1, 2023.

=== Tetris: The Grand Master 3 – Terror‑Instinct ===
Tetris: The Grand Master 3 – Terror‑Instinct was released in 2005. The game runs on PC-based hardware, specifically the Taito Type X. The level system has been expanded in many forms with increasingly stricter requirements to reach the Grand Master rank. Modes include Easy, Sakura (a puzzle mode also seen in Tetris With Cardcaptor Sakura: Eternal Heart), the traditional Master mode, and Shirase (an extension of T.A. Death with even harsher speed, garbage, and levels beyond 999). It also features World and Classic Rules, the former added by Arika due to The Tetris Company's then-recent policy changes.

=== Tetris: The Grand Master Ace ===
Released in 2005 as a Japan-only launch title for the Xbox 360, this was the only game in the series exclusive to home consoles.

=== Tetris: The Grand Master 4 – Absolute Eye ===
In September 2009, Arika unveiled a planned fourth game titled Tetris: The Grand Master 4 – The Masters of Round at the Amusement Machine Show. Tetris: The Grand Master 4 was supposed to run on the Sega RingWide hardware. On September 18, 2010, Arika Vice President Ichiro Mihara announced the cancellation of The Grand Master 4 on his blog. In July 2015, Arika began location testing The Grand Master 4 in Japan and the United States. The title was changed to The Grand Master 2015 reflecting the lack of a Tetris license or planned release.

On September 26, 2024, Arika and The Tetris Company announced that they had signed a licensing deal to release a new Tetris: The Grand Master game. On December 4, 2024, the title was announced under the name Tetris: The Grand Master 4 – Absolute Eye. The game was released on April 4, 2025, for Microsoft Windows. In May 2026, a version for Nintendo Switch was announced, which was released later the same year on June 4.

=== Cancelled games ===
==== PlayStation port ====
Tetris: The Grand Master was to be ported to the PlayStation in 1999, but because of a licensing restriction the port was canceled.

==== TGM-K (tentative name) ====
In July 2004 Arika announced TGM-K for release on the PlayStation Portable. However, development was abandoned when Arika could not secure a license because of a combination of Electronic Arts having the license for the PSP, and The Tetris Company's concern about the proliferation of TGM clones.
