= Blue Planet Software =

American video game developer and publisher

Blue Planet Software Inc.
- Type: Private
- Industry: Video games
- Predecessor: Bullet-Proof Software Inc.
- Founded: 1995; 31 years ago
- Founder: Henk Rogers
- Defunct: October 2020; 5 years ago
- Fate: Acquired by The Tetris Company
- Headquarters: Honolulu, Hawaii, United States
- Area served: Worldwide
- Key people: Henk Rogers; Maya Rogers
- Products: Video games

Blue Planet Software Inc. was an American video game developer and publisher founded by Henk Rogers in Honolulu, Hawaii in 1995. The company was founded as the successor to Bullet-Proof Software Inc. (BPS), founded in 1983 by Rogers in Japan, which closed on 22 February 2001.

== History ==
=== Bullet-Proof Software ===
Bullet-Proof Software Inc.
- Type: Private
- Industry: Video games
- Founded: August 10, 1983; 43 years ago
- Founder: Henk Rogers
- Defunct: February 22, 2001; 25 years ago
- Fate: Closed
- Successor: Blue Planet Software Inc.
- Headquarters: Kōhoku-ku, Kanagawa, Japan
- Products: Video games

The original Bullet-Proof Software started operation in 1983 in Japan by Henk Rogers, with The Black Onyx as its first title, and go on to become the number one title of 1984, and the number two video game of 1985, and had an ability to import Western games to Japan, most notably the hit game Tetris, which became an instant blockbuster success.

The company name is taken from the term, "Bullet-Proof", which means "bulletproof," it also means "perfect," and the name was chosen to signify perfect software.

The original BPS (Bullet-Proof Software) had an American operation from October 1989 to late 1993, based in Redmond, Washington. Among games from the US operation was a technological first-person shooter based on MIDI Maze, Faceball 2000 for the Game Boy and the SNES.

The American operation of BPS was sold to Spectrum HoloByte in 1993, and its development team moved to a startup led by Scott Tsumura, who was president and CEO of the US BPS, in Redmond after selling the BPS subsidiary, called Big Bang Software, which was later merged into Nintendo Software Technology.

=== Blue Planet Software ===
Rogers went on to form a new company with the same abbreviation, Blue Planet Software in 1995, and the first game was The Next Tetris, which was published by Hasbro Interactive, and The New Tetris, published by Nintendo, and the company, along with affiliate The Tetris Company, licensed Tetris rights to THQ in 2000.

Rogers' daughter, Maya Rogers, became CEO in 2014. In October 2020, Blue Planet Software Inc. was rolled into The Tetris Company.

== List of games ==
Game	Released	Platform
Bakuto Dochers	October 28, 1994	Super Famicom
Black Onyx Plus	1984	PC-8801, MSX, FM-7, SG-1000, Family Computer, Game Boy Color
Bombliss Cup '95 (ボンブリス・カップ９５)	1995	Super Famicom (via Satellaview)
Dekitate High School	July 7, 1995	Super Famicom
Faceball 2000	September 1992	Game Boy, Super NES, Virtual Boy (Canceled)
Hatris	1990	Game Boy
Igo: Kyū Roban Taikyoku	1987	Family Computer, Famicom Disk System
Japanese Touring Car Championship	1996	PlayStation (Cancelled)
Michael Andretti's Indy Car Challenge	September 1994	Super NES
The New Tetris	July 31, 1999	Nintendo 64
The Next Tetris: On-line Edition	December 19, 2000	Dreamcast
Obitus	1991	Super NES
Pipe Mania	1990	Game Boy
Seijyuu Maden: Beast & Blade	December 15, 1995	Super Famicom
Super Tetris 2	December 18, 1992	Super Famicom
Super Tetris 3	December 16, 1994	Super Famicom
Tetris	November 18, 1988	FM-7, MSX2, PC-8800, PC-9800, X1, X68000
Tetris	December 22, 1988	Family Computer
Tetris Battle Gaiden	1993	Super Famicom
Tetris Party	October 14, 2008	Wii
Tetris Plus	1990	Arcade
Tetris S	November 27, 1996	Sega Saturn
Tetris Stars	2011	Facebook
Tetris Zone	2007	Macintosh, Windows
Tōge Densetsu: Saisoku Battle	March 15, 1996	Super Famicom
True Golf Classics: Wicked 18	March 5, 1993	Super NES, 3DO
The Twisted Tales of Spike McFang	1994	Super NES
Welltris	1989	Various
WildSnake	September 1994	Game Boy, Super NES
Wordtris	1991	Game Boy, Super NES
V-Tetris	1995	Virtual Boy
Yoshi's Cookie	1993	Super NES
L42	Cancelled	Xbox, PlayStation 2, GameCube
