= Tetris Forever =

2024 video game

- Developer: Digital Eclipse
- Publisher: Digital Eclipse
- Series: Tetris
- Platforms: Nintendo Switch; PlayStation 4; PlayStation 5; Windows; Xbox One; Xbox Series X/S
- Release: November 12, 2024
- Genre: Puzzle
- Modes: Single-player, multiplayer

Tetris Forever is a 2024 video game compilation and interactive documentary developed and published by Digital Eclipse. Released in commemoration of the 40th anniversary of Tetris, the compilation includes over fifteen different versions of Tetris, including the new game Tetris Time Warp. It released for the Nintendo Switch, PlayStation 4, PlayStation 5, Windows, Xbox One, and Xbox Series X/S on November 12, 2024.

This game is the third entry of Digital Eclipse's Gold Master Series of interactive documentaries after The Making of Karateka (2023) and Llamasoft: The Jeff Minter Story (2024), which are presented as a historical timeline and feature interviews with key people in the development of Tetris such as Alexey Pajitnov and Henk Rogers, alongside several playable games.

== Content ==
Tetris Forever is the third entry in Digital Eclipse's Gold Master Series of documentary video game hybrid releases, following The Making of Karateka (2023) and Llamasoft: The Jeff Minter Story (2024). As with other releases, the games are presented in a digital museum format, divided into five distinct timelines. These feature photographs, interviews, scans of original advertisements.

90 minutes of documentary footage about the history of Tetris is included, which predominantly contains interviews and perspective of Tetris from the point of view from people who had created and sold Tetris games. It includes interviews with game developers Alexey Pajitnov and Henk Rogers, former Spectrum Holobyte president and chairmain Phil Adam and Gilman Louie, Broderbund Software founder Doug Carlston, Tetris Effect producer Tetsuya Mizuguchi, and The Tetris Company president Maya Rogers.

Tetris Forever includes several different Tetris games. These include a recreation of Pajitnov's version of Tetris for the Electronika 60, the 1988 Apple II version developed by Spectrum Holobyte, and several other Tetris titles developed by Bullet-Proof Software between 1988 and 1998, some of which have never been released outside of Japan. A new game included in the compilation is Tetris Time Warp, which supports up to four players. During the game, special pieces will drop that changes the gameplay style to an earlier Tetris version, and the player must clear a challenge to return the game to normal.

=== Games ===
The following games are included in Tetris Forever:

Games in the collection
Title	Electronika 60	MS-DOS	Apple II	Famicom	NES	Game Boy	Super Famicom	Game Boy Color	Other	Note
Tetris	Yes	—N/a	—N/a	—N/a	—N/a	—N/a	—N/a	—N/a	—N/a	Recreation
Tetris	—N/a	Yes	—N/a	—N/a	—N/a	—N/a	—N/a	—N/a	—N/a	AcademySoft version
Tetris	—N/a	Yes	—N/a	—N/a	—N/a	—N/a	—N/a	—N/a	—N/a	AcademySoft version v. 3.12; Post-launch addition
Igo: Kyuu Roban Taikyoku	—N/a	—N/a	—N/a	Yes	—N/a	—N/a	—N/a	—N/a	—N/a	
Tetris	—N/a	Yes	Yes	—N/a	—N/a	—N/a	—N/a	—N/a	—N/a	Spectrum Holobyte versions
Super Tetris	—N/a	Yes	—N/a	—N/a	—N/a	—N/a	—N/a	—N/a	—N/a	Post-launch addition
Tetris	—N/a	—N/a	—N/a	Yes	—N/a	—N/a	—N/a	—N/a	—N/a	
Welltris	—N/a	Yes	—N/a	—N/a	—N/a	—N/a	—N/a	—N/a	—N/a	Post-launch addition
Hatris	—N/a	—N/a	—N/a	Yes	Yes	Yes	—N/a	—N/a	—N/a	
Tetris 2 + BomBliss	—N/a	—N/a	—N/a	Yes	—N/a	—N/a	—N/a	—N/a	—N/a	
Super Tetris 2 + BomBliss	—N/a	—N/a	—N/a	—N/a	—N/a	—N/a	Yes	—N/a	—N/a	
Super Tetris 2 + BomBliss Genteiban	—N/a	—N/a	—N/a	—N/a	—N/a	—N/a	Yes	—N/a	—N/a	
Tetris Battle Gaiden	—N/a	—N/a	—N/a	—N/a	—N/a	—N/a	Yes	—N/a	—N/a	
Super Tetris 3	—N/a	—N/a	—N/a	—N/a	—N/a	—N/a	Yes	—N/a	—N/a	
Super Bombliss	—N/a	—N/a	—N/a	—N/a	—N/a	—N/a	Yes	—N/a	—N/a	
Super Bombliss	—N/a	—N/a	—N/a	—N/a	—N/a	Yes	—N/a	—N/a	—N/a	
Super Bombliss DX	—N/a	—N/a	—N/a	—N/a	—N/a	—N/a	—N/a	Yes	—N/a	
Tetris Time Warp	—N/a	—N/a	—N/a	—N/a	—N/a	—N/a	—N/a	—N/a	Yes	Original game created for Tetris Forever

== Development ==
Tetris Forever was developed by Digital Eclipse, who had developed similar interactive documentaries in the past. It was first announced during a Nintendo Direct stream on August 27, 2024; while the collection excludes games developed by Nintendo, their NES version was revealed to be heading to Nintendo Switch Online in the same announcement. In October, Digital Eclipse revealed that the MS-DOS versions of Tetris by AcademySoft and Spectrum HoloByte would be included in the release. Chris Kohler, the game's editorial director, said these additions involved "a lot of work went into being able to make this simple announcement." Additional games are planned for inclusion via free updates, beginning with the MS-DOS version of Welltris in December 2024.

== Release and reception ==
Reception

Aggregate score
Aggregator	Score
Metacritic	(NS) 85/100 (PS5) 82/100 (PC) 80/100 (XBXS) 89/100

Review scores
Publication	Score
Eurogamer	4/5
Famitsu	8/10, 8/10, 7/10, 10/10
Nintendo Life	8/10
Nintendo World Report	9.5/10
Push Square	9/10
Retro Gamer	84%
Video Games Chronicle	5/5

Tetris Forever was released on November 12, 2024 for the Atari VCS, PlayStation 4, PlayStation 5, Xbox Series X/S, Xbox One, Nintendo Switch, and for PC through Steam and GOG. The release is in commemoration of the 40th anniversary of the original Tetris.

Critics commented on the documentary portion of the Tetris Forever, with Ollie Reynolds of NintendoLife saying it was "certainly the best breakdown of the franchise's creation and evolution so far." Christian Donlan of Eurogamer wrote that the best parts of Tetris Forever was when its documentary "steps away from the familiar story, the familiar falling shapes, the familiar talking heads and talking points, and makes Tetris feel really weird again."

Willem Hilhorst of Nintendo World Report complimented the emulation of the games, noting that they even captured the slow down of the original versions. Critics generally found the game lacked some key titles to play, such as titles developed by Nintendo. Nick Thorpe of Retro Gamer commented on the rights issues for the games, stating that Digital Eclipse was "doing its best with a very awkward situation – Nintendo is simply never going to license the Game Boy version of Tetris for a game like this, no matter how important it is to the historical story being told."

In December 2024, Tetris Forever was nominated for a 2025 British Academy Games Award for Game Beyond Entertainment, an award for video games which "raise awareness through empathy and emotional impact, to engage with real world problems, or to make the world a better place."
