= Tetris (film) =

2023 biographical thriller film

- Promotional poster
- Directed by: Jon S. Baird
- Written by: Noah Pink
- Produced by: Matthew Vaughn; Gillian Berrie; Claudia Schiffer; Len Blavatnik; Gregor Cameron
- Starring: Taron Egerton; Nikita Yefremov; Sofia Lebedeva; Anthony Boyle; Toby Jones
- Cinematography: Alwin Küchler
- Edited by: Martin Walsh; Colin Goudie; Ben Mills
- Music by: Lorne Balfe
- Production companies: Apple Studios; Marv Studios; AI Film; Unigram
- Distributed by: Apple TV+
- Release dates: March 15, 2023 (SXSW); March 31, 2023 (United States)
- Running time: 118 minutes
- Countries: United Kingdom; United States
- Languages: English; Russian; Japanese
- Budget: $80 million

Tetris is a 2023 biographical political thriller film based on true events around the race to license and patent the video game Tetris from Soviet Russia in the late 1980s during the Cold War. It was directed by Jon S. Baird and written by Noah Pink. The film stars Taron Egerton, Nikita Efremov, Sofia Lebedeva, and Anthony Boyle. The plot follows Henk Rogers of Bullet-Proof Software, who becomes interested in the game Tetris, created by Alexey Pajitnov, during an electronics show. Desperate to obtain handheld console rights for Nintendo, he takes trips between Japan, the United States, and Russia to win legal battles over the game's ownership.

Development of Tetris began in July 2020. Filming began in Glasgow in December 2020, including Glasgow Prestwick Airport. In February 2021, filming took place in Aberdeen at locations including the University of Aberdeen's Zoology Building. Filming took place for 7 days in and around the former (RAF) military base at Balado in Perth & Kinross. Production wrapped in early March 2021.

Tetris premiered at the SXSW Film Festival on March 15, 2023, and was released on March 31, by Apple TV+. The film received generally positive reviews from critics.

== Plot ==
Henk Rogers of Bullet-Proof Software becomes enamored with the game Tetris at the 1988 Consumer Electronics Show (CES) in Las Vegas. The game was created by Soviet programmer Alexey Pajitnov, an employee of government-owned ELORG in the Soviet Union. Rogers explains to a bank manager that Robert Stein of Andromeda Software obtained the worldwide licensing rights to Tetris from ELORG and signed a contract with media tycoon Robert Maxwell and his son, Mirrorsoft CEO Kevin Maxwell, allowing them to distribute Tetris in exchange for royalties. Meanwhile, the Mirrorsoft representative at CES sells Rogers the Tetris rights in Japan for PC, console, and arcade.

Rogers creates a partnership with Nintendo CEO Hiroshi Yamauchi to produce Tetris for the Nintendo Famicom and arcade machines. After production begins, Kevin tells Rogers the arcade rights have already been promised to Sega. Rogers asks Yamauchi for his residuals in advance. Yamuchi sends him instead to the Nintendo of America headquarters in Seattle where he previews the handheld Game Boy, due to be released with Super Mario Land. Rogers convinces President Minoru Arakawa and General Counsel Howard Lincoln to package it with Tetris instead, promising to obtain the handheld licensing rights.

Rogers meets the Maxwells in London and learns Stein retains all worldwide licensing rights. Rogers purchases the worldwide handheld rights for $25,000, but Arakawa and Lincoln tell Rogers that Stein has promised the handheld rights to Atari for $100,000. Rogers travels to Moscow to secure the handheld rights. He hires a young woman named Sasha as his interpreter, and shows a Famicom copy of Tetris to ELORG chairman Nikolai Belikov. Rogers is told his copy is "illegal" because ELORG has only released the PC rights to Stein, not rights to video game consoles.

Rogers befriends Alexey Pajitnov as rights meetings continue Rogers helps Pajitnov improve the game's mechanics, and Pajitnov takes Rogers to a nightclub in Moscow where they learn Estonia is rebelling against the Soviet Union and that major geopolitical changes are imminent.

Rogers, Stein, and Kevin negotiate separately with Belikov. Rogers claims Stein exploited the original contract, which did not define a PC, in order to also sell the rights to video game consoles, and suggests Belikov define a PC as having a keyboard, monitor, and disk drive. Belikov does so in a new contract with Stein that increases ELORG's PC royalties, and Stein's eagerness to discuss handheld rights causes him to sign the revised contract without noticing the new language.

Valentin Trifonov, head of the Department of Foreign Trade of the Central Committee of the Communist Party of the Soviet Union, becomes interested in the negotiations and involves the KGB to ensure he can profit from potential sales of Tetris. The KGB threatens Rogers, Pajitnov, and their families. Mirrorsoft offers $1 million cash and the rights to distribute its catalog of encyclopedias to ELORG in exchange for the handheld rights of Tetris. Belikov drafts a letter of intent to sell handheld rights to Mirrorsoft on the condition that the $1 million is received within one week. Mirrorsoft fails to make the deadline and Atari releases its version of Tetris.

In a last-ditch effort to obtain the rights, Robert and Kevin Maxwell visit Mikhail Gorbachev, leader of the Soviet Union, to warn him against selling the game to capitalist interests. Gorbachev dismisses their concerns and orders his guards to surveil Trifonov.

ELORG accepts Nintendo's offer of $5 million for console and handheld rights but Lincoln, Arakawa, and Rogers have to leave Moscow with the paperwork to finalize the deal. Maxwell, desperate to stop them, agrees to give Trifonov 50% ownership of Tetris if he can intercept Rogers. After a car chase to the airport, the three board a plane, and Trifonov is arrested by Sasha, revealed as a KGB agent.

Rogers returns to Tokyo, and Tetris is released in the West to huge success. Just before the dissolution of the Soviet Union, Rogers flies Pajitnov's family to the United States. An epilogue explains that Rogers and Pajitnov, still good friends, had went on to start The Tetris Company.

== Cast ==
- Taron Egerton as Henk Rogers
- Nikita Yefremov as Alexey Pajitnov
- Sofia Lebedeva as Sasha
- Anthony Boyle as Kevin Maxwell
- Ben Miles as Howard Lincoln
- Ken Yamamura as Minoru Arakawa
- Igor Grabuzov as Valentin Trifonov
- Oleg Stefan as Nikolai Belikov
- Ayane Nagabuchi as Akemi Rogers
- Rick Yune as Eddie (credited as bank manager)
- Roger Allam as Robert Maxwell
- Toby Jones as Robert Stein
- Togo Igawa as Hiroshi Yamauchi
- Matthew Marsh as Mikhail Gorbachev
- Ieva Andrejevaitė as Nina Pajitnov
- Kanon Narumi as Maya Rogers

== Production ==
=== Development ===
In July 2020, it was reported that a biopic was being made about the making of Tetris, which would delve into the legal battles that took place during the Cold War over ownership of the game, with Jon S. Baird directing and Taron Egerton cast to portray the game publisher Henk Rogers. Egerton confirmed this report in an August 2020 interview, explaining that the film would mirror a tone similar to The Social Network. In November 2020, Apple TV+ acquired the film.

=== Filming ===
Filming began in Glasgow in December 2020, including Glasgow Prestwick Airport on the Ayrshire coast. In February 2021, filming took place in Aberdeen at locations including the University of Aberdeen's Zoology Building, which was used as the headquarters of Soviet firm ELORG, and Seamount Court which was used for several scenes. Filming took place for 7 days in and around the former (RAF) military base at Balado in Perth & Kinross; particularly internal scenes for a quasi-military backdrop. Production then returned to Glasgow for a few days, before wrapping in early March 2021.

== Release ==
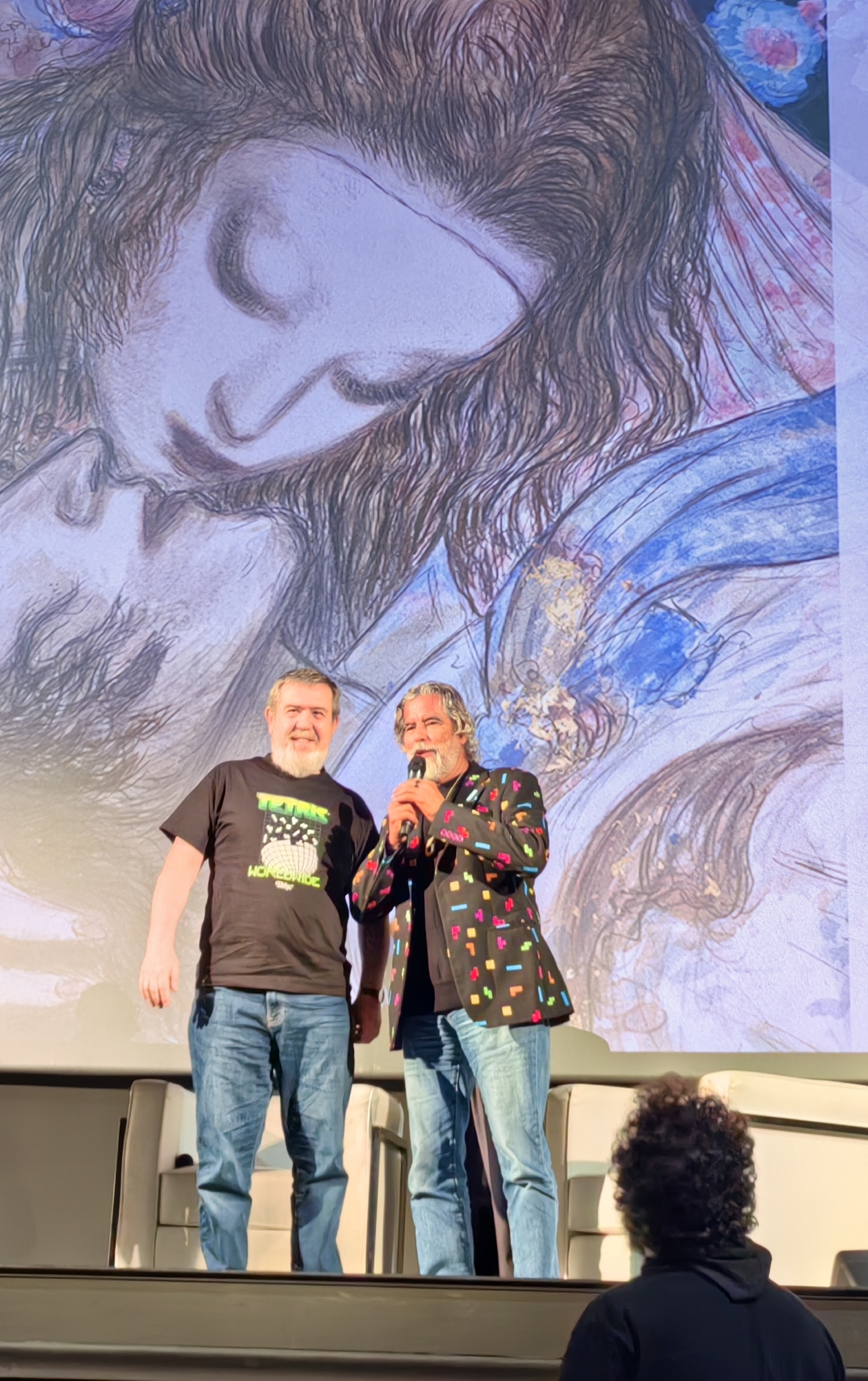
Alexey Pajitnov (left) and Henk Rogers at the screening of the film at Lucca Comics & Games 2024

The film premiered at the 2023 South by Southwest Film & TV Festival on March 15, 2023. It premiered on Apple TV+ on March 31, 2023. According to a Samba TV research panel of 3.1 million smart television households who tuned in for at least one minute, Tetris drew in 88,000 viewers in its first two days.

As of 2026, the film is also available on Sony Pictures Core, Amazon Prime Video and Fandango at Home.

== Reception ==
=== Critical response ===
On the review aggregator website Rotten Tomatoes, 82% of 190 critics' reviews are positive, with an average rating of 6.7/10. The website's consensus reads: "While it's nowhere near as addictive or fast-paced as the game, Tetris offers a fun, fizzy account of the story behind an 8-bit classic." Metacritic, which uses a weighted average, assigned the film a score of 61 out of 100, based on 36 critics, indicating "generally favorable" reviews.

=== Accolades ===
Award	Category	Subject	Result	Ref.
2023 Golden Trailer Awards	Best Music and Best Action/Thriller TrailerByte for a Feature Film	Tetris	Nominated	
6th Hollywood Critics Association Midseason Film Awards	Best Actor	Taron Egerton	Nominated	

=== Lawsuit ===
In August 2023, Dan Ackerman, the chief editor of Gizmodo, sued Apple for "illegally copying" his 2016 book The Tetris Effect: The Game That Hypnotized the World. Ackerman asked the court for monetary damages of $4.8 million, which was 6% of the film's $80 million production budget. The claim was rejected by the court later.

== Historical accuracy ==
In an interview prior to the film's release, Henk Rogers said that he and Alexey Pajitnov reviewed the script and made suggestions. Rogers noted, "It's a Hollywood script, a movie. It's not about history so a lot of [what's in the movie] never happened." Some events in the movie were true. For instance, Rogers notes that he convinced Nintendo to bundle Tetris with the Game Boy at launch in place of Super Mario Land. Rogers emphasized that the producers wanted to "capture the darkness and the brooding" that he felt during his time trying to get the rights to Tetris in Soviet Russia. For dramatic effect, the interpreter in the film was a KGB agent, which Rogers had already been aware of. In the end of the film, a car chase is depicted, although this did not happen when Rogers left the Soviet Union.

== See also ==
- Tetris: The Games People Play, 2016 graphic novel
- List of films based on video games
- BlackBerry, a similar dramatization of the history of the titular mobile phone
