= Super Bombliss =

1995 video game

- Super Famicom box art
- Publisher: Bullet-Proof Software
- Platform: Super Famicom
- Release: JP: March 17, 1995
- Genre: Puzzle
- Modes: Single-player, multiplayer

Super Bombliss (Note: Japanese: スーパーボンブリス, Hepburn: Sūpābonburisu) is a 1995 puzzle game for the Super Famicom. The Bombliss games originally featured as an addition to version of Tetris for the Japanese home market such as Tetris 2 + Bombliss (1991), with Super Bombliss for the Super Famicom and Tetris Blast for the Game Boy being the first stand-alone titles.

The game involves removing blocks that fall into a container by making them form a solid row. Additionally, the player can remove blocks through red circles that act as bombs on the playing field that cause explosions further removing lines. The game features various modes of play that involve competitive modes against computer players, human players and a timer and unique to the Super Famicom version, with puzzle modes that force you to clear a stage with only a certain amount of set blocks.

The game received positive reviews in Famicom Tsūshin and Super GamePower and was part of one of the earliest online competitive gaming events for consoles through the Satellaview add-on.

== Gameplay ==
The goal in Super Bombliss is to clear the screen of blocks. Some pieces have red circles which are bombs. The player can align bombs next to each other which causes larger explosions.

Super Bombliss features three games modes: against the computer, a player versus player mode, and one called "Puzzle". In Puzzle mode, the player must completely wipe the screen of blocks with limited blocks. In versus mode, the player goes against eight computer opponents. In these game modes, the player can alter the difficulty between easy, normal or hard.

== Development ==
Super Bombliss is rooted in a game called Bombliss which was designed by Akihiko Miura. Bombliss was released as part of Tetris 2 + Bombliss on December 13, 1991 for the Famicom in Japan.

Bombliss received its first stand-alone title with Super Bombliss for the Super Famicom. New modes were made where the player can compete against computer characters.

== Release ==
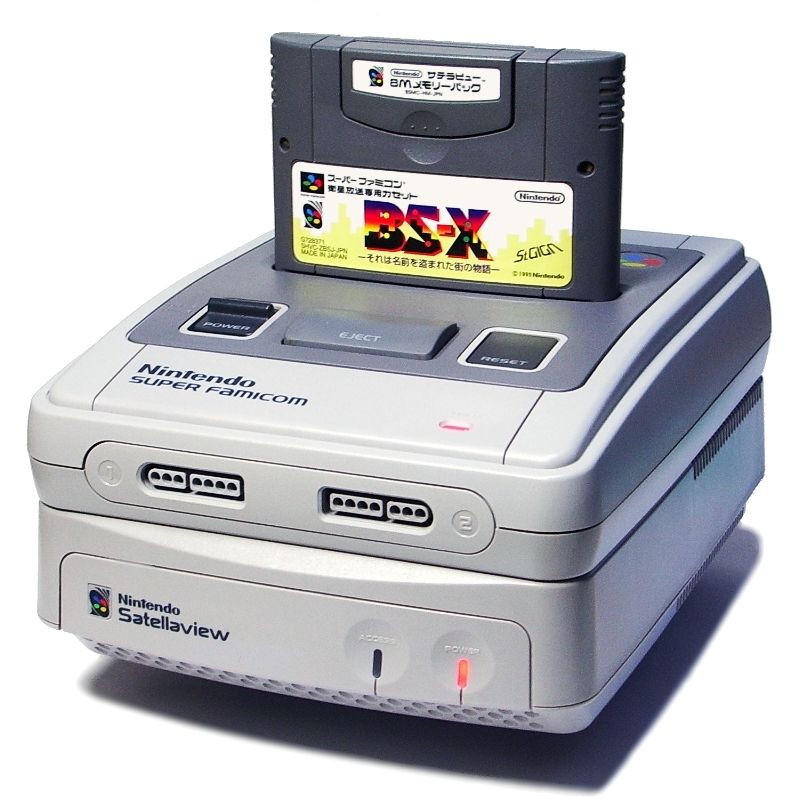
Super Bombliss was part of an early online competitive gaming event for consoles held in October 1995 through the Satellaview add-on to the Super Famicom.

Bullet-Proof Software showcased Super Bombliss at Nintendo's Shoshinkai tradeshow in 1994 along with Chou Mahou Tairiku WOZZ, Shutokō Battle 2 and Super Tetris 3. Super Bombliss was released in Japan for the Super Famicom on March 17, 1995. A similar game also originally titled Super Bombliss was released for the Game Boy in Japan on the same date. This game was later released in English territories as Tetris Blast in 1996. Both the Game Boy and Super Famicom versions of Super Bombliss were re-released in the video game compilation Tetris Forever in 2024.

In April 1995, Nintendo released the Satellaview, a satellite modem add-on for the Super Famicom. This allowed users to download and play games related through satellite broadcasts from the Japanese satellite radio company St.GIGA. Nintendo and St.GIGA held high-score gaming contests during scheduled broadcast times with one of the major events being a competition with Super Bombliss in October 1995. The competition for Super Bombliss involved players completing timed modes to see who could beat it the fastest. It was among the earliest online competitive game events for consoles.

== Reception ==
Reception

Review scores
| Publication | Score |
|---|---|
| Famitsu | 8/10, 6/10, 8/10, 7/10 |
| Super GamePower | 3.5/5 |

In Famicom Tsūshin two of the four reviewers complimented how the game was refined from previous iterations in the series. Two reviewers also felt the puzzle mode was the highlight, with one reviewer questioning why they bothered creating eight computer opponents as they all basically act the same and had no distinct personalities. One reviewer said that despite the different rules of the game, they felt it couldn't compete with Tetris overall.

In Gamers magazine, the reivewer complimented the background graphics as being well done and that they would encourage players to continue even if they are less interested in this genre of game. They ultimately described the game as a "real treat" and recommended it to fans of Tetris. In, Super GamePower they complimented the game describing it as the perfect work way to warm up their brain as student return to a school year after the summer.
