= Tetris Blast =

1995 video game

- Box art
- Developer: Bullet-Proof Software
- Publisher: Nintendo
- Series: Tetris
- Platform: Game Boy
- Release: JP: March 17, 1995; US: January 23, 1996; UK: June 1996
- Genre: Puzzle
- Modes: Single-player, multiplayer

Tetris Blast, known in Japan as Super Bombliss (Note: Japanese: スーパーボンブリス, Hepburn: Sūpābonburisu) is a 1995 puzzle video game released for the Game Boy. Developed by Bullet-Proof Software, Tetris Blast has its roots in a game called Bombliss, designed by a Japanese team and first released in Tetris 2 + Bombliss for the Famicom in Japan.

Tetris Blast follows the mechanics of Tetris with the addition of bombs to some of the blocks. When a full row of blocks is completed, any bombs within the blocks explode which has the potential to set off a chain reaction of other blocks nearby. The game has three modes: one for practice. The second is titled "Contest" where the goal is to clear an area of blocks in a chute already filled with blocks and bombs. The third is Fight mode which allows for the player to play the game while insect-like creatures cause problems on the playing board from adding blocks to eating bombs.

Tetris Blast was released in Japan in 1995 and then the following year for the Game Boy. The Japanese publication Famitsu lamented the lack of a puzzle mode and said it lacked enough differences from previous iterations of Bombliss. A number of English-language reviewers generally complimented Tetris Blast, while finding it not as strong as the original Tetris.

== Gameplay ==
As in the original Tetris, the goal is to clear away blocks before the stack gets too high. Unlike the original game, Tetris Blast allows the player to slide their blocks even after they have landed. Some blocks contain bombs. When a line is cleared a bomb in that row explodes.

There are three modes of play in Tetris Blast: a training mode where the player can choose ten different speeds the blocks can drop from. As the blocks fall from the top of the screen, the player can stack and destroy blocks. There is no end game to this mode. In Contest mode, the player stacks blocks as they fall in a partially pre-filled chute. The goal is to clear existing blocks from the chute by placing new blocks and bombs around them. In Fight mode, insect-like enemies float around the playfield and try to edit the blocks. This ranges from adding blocks to the screen, eating the bombs, or even adding an entire row of blocks. Players can hinder their activities by dropping blocks on them or activating the bombs to cause damage to them.

Tetris Blast features a two-player mode where players can battle head-to-head via a Game Boy link cable. The two-player mode is not accessible when playing via the Super Game Boy adapter.

== Development ==
The initial gameplay of Tetris Blast is rooted in a game called Bombliss which was designed by Akihiko Miura. Tetris creator Alexey Pajitnov visited Japan in the Spring of 1989 and met with Tsunekazu Ishihara, who showed him the concept. Ishihara would be the producer for a game titled Tetris 2 + Bombliss. The Japanese developers spent the next two and a half years developing the game. On December 13, 1991, Bullet-Proof Software released Tetris 2 + Bombliss for the Famicom in Japan.

Tetris Blast was developed by Bullet-Proof Software.

== Release ==
Tetris Blast was released for the Game Boy in Japan as Super Bombliss on March 17, 1995. A similar game also called Super Bombliss was released for the Super Famicom in Japan on the same date. Both versions of Super Bombliss were re-released in the video game compilation Tetris Forever in 2024.

The game was released in the United States and Europe as Tetris Blast. It was released in the United States on January 23, 1996. This was followed by a June 1996 release in the United Kingdom.

== Reception ==
Reception

Review scores
Publication	Score
Electronic Gaming Monthly	7/10, 8/10, 8.5/10, 8/10
Famitsu	6/10, 6/10, 6/10, 6/10
Game Informer	8.75/10
Houston Chronicle	A
Lincolnshire Echo	15/20
Mega Fun	74%

Reviewing Super Bombliss, Famitsu magazine in Japan had two of its four reviewers lament that it lacked the puzzle mode and two reviewers saying that the training and contest modes were "more of the same" from the Bombliss series. One reviewer found it less exciting than the Super Famicom game of the same title while another said the fight mode was "surprisingly good."

A review in Game Informer described the game as "Easily one of the more entertaining Game Boy puzzle games to come down the pipeline in a while." Nintendo Power complimented the game as being very fun and addictive with four out of five of its editors of the magazine having it as their "Editors Pick" of the month.

Reviews in some newspapers compared the game to other Tetris games, with a reviewer in the Lincolnshire Echo said that games like Super Tetris and Tetris 2 tampered with the perfection of the original game and that Tetris Blast suffers by a similar problem by adding bombs which they described as mere novelty. A reviewer in the Los Angeles Times said the game was fun but not as fun as the original but "pretty darn good when stacked against other games on the market." A reviewer in Mega Fun described it as a worthy continuation of the Tetris series, as it boasted some interesting ideas, while finding that the pre-defined levels in the game won't keep audiences occupied a long time.

== See also ==
- List of Game Boy games
- List of Super Game Boy games
