= Total Control =

Total Control may refer to:

== Music ==
- Total Control (band), an Australian post-punk/garage rock band
- Total Control (John Norum album), 1987
- Total Control (Yo-Yo album), 1996
- Total Control (EP) by Missy Higgins, 2022
- "Total Control" (song), by the Motels, 1979

== Other uses ==
- Total Control (novel), by David Baldacci, 1997
- Total Control (TV series), a 2019–2024 Australian political drama series
- Total Control (video game), a 1995 Russian strategy game
- Total Control (magazine), a 1998–1999 British video game magazine
- Total Control, a media gateway technology created by U.S. Robotics and used by CommWorks Corporation
