= Blockout =

1989 video game

- Developers: P.Z.Karen; Logical Design Works
- Publishers: California Dreams; American Technos (arcade); Rainbow Arts; Electronic Arts; Sega; Atari Corporation; Jelly Beans (PC-98)
- Designer: Aleksander Ustaszewski
- Programmer: Mirosław Zabłocki
- Platforms: Amiga, Apple IIGS, Arcade, Atari ST, Commodore 64, MS-DOS, Sega Genesis, Atari Lynx, Mac OS, PC-98
- Release: Arcade: NA: October 1989; Mega Drive/Genesis: JP: November 1, 1991; WW: 1991
- Genre: Puzzle

Blockout is a 1989 puzzle video game developed by Logical Design Works and P.Z.Karen and published by California Dreams. It was developed in Poland by Aleksander Ustaszewski and Mirosław Zabłocki. It is a 3D puzzle game similar to Tetris. Technōs Japan developed an arcade port titled Block Out.

== Gameplay ==
Mega Drive version

The player's perspective is that of looking down into a three-dimensional rectangular pit. Polycube blocks of various shapes appear, one at a time, and fall slowly toward the bottom of the pit. The player can use three buttons to rotate the block around any of the three coordinate axes, and can also maneuver the block horizontally and vertically with the joystick. Once any part of a block comes to rest on the floor of the pit or in contact with an already-placed cube, the entire block freezes in place and can no longer be moved. The player can press a button on the joystick to quickly drop a block. Once a solid layer of cubes is formed with no gaps (a "face"), it disappears and all cubes above it drop toward the bottom of the pit to fill the space. Completing multiple faces with a single block awards higher scores, and the player earns a "Block Out" bonus for emptying the pit. A set number of faces must be completed in order to end each round.

As the game progresses, the blocks begin to drop faster, the dimensions of the pit change from round to round, and differently-shaped blocks start to appear. A bonus stage is played after every fifth round, in which the player has 30 seconds to form as many faces as possible in a 2x2 pit. The game ends if the blocks stack up to the top of the pit, with the exception of the bonus stages; in the latter case, the stage ends immediately and the player advances to the next round.

The game allows head-to-head competition between two players, each of whom has their own pit and blocks. When one player completes a face, all the cubes in the opponent's pit are raised by one level. A player can win a round by either being the first to complete a set number of faces or by forcing their opponent's cubes to stack up to the top of the pit. The first player to win a set number of rounds may continue the game alone in single-player mode.

== Reception ==
Reception

Review scores
Publication	Score
Famitsu	7/10, 7/10, 7/10, 6/10 (Mega Drive)
IGN	8/10 (Lynx)
MegaTech	91%
Mega	67%
PC Leisure	4/5

Award
Publication	Award
MegaTech	Hyper Game

The New York Times reviewed the game in an article about educational software for mathematics, writing that Blockout "doesn't pretend to be educational, but the skills required to master it are not unrelated to mathematics, particularly geometry." A 1993 study found evidence that playing Blockout improved the spatial visualization ability of 10- to 14-year-olds.

In Japan, Game Machine listed Block Out on their March 1, 1990 issue as being the tenth most-successful table arcade unit of the month. It was released for the Sega Mega Drive in Japan on November 1, 1991.

Dragon gave the game's Atari Lynx version a perfect score. Robert A. Jung reviewed the Atari Lynx version of the game, which was published on IGN. In his final verdict, he wrote: "This is a nice, addictive, no-nonsense strategy game. Without any patterns to memorize and several options to choose from, Blockout will keep its freshness for quite some time. If you thought Tetris was too simple, give this title a try." He scored the game eight out of ten.

Entertainment Weekly gave the game an A, deeming it the #17 greatest game available in 1991.

== Legacy ==
Around 2007, a modernized, authorized continuation/remake named Blockout II was released with a license from Kadon Enterprises, to use the trademarked Blockout name. The game is open-source and was ported to many platforms the original wasn't available before, like Microsoft Windows, Ubuntu, and the OpenPandora handheld.

On February 19, 2008, an officially licensed crossover with Tetris titled Tetris Blockout was released by EA Mobile for mobile phones with authorization of both Blue Planet Software and Kadon Enterprises.

In 2021, a web browser-based version written in JavaScript and HTML5 was released. It is officially licensed to use the name Blockout.

== See also ==
- Welltris
