= Blue Startups =

- Type: Private
- Industry: Venture Accelerator
- Founded: September 1, 2012; 13 years ago
- Founder: Henk Rogers; Maya Rogers; Chenoa Farnsworth
- Headquarters: Honolulu, Hawaii, United States
- Services: Assisting in business growth
- Website: bluestartups.com

Blue Startups is a venture accelerator based in Honolulu, Hawaiʻi, United States. Founded in 2012 by entrepreneur Henk Rogers, his daughter Maya Rogers, and venture capitalist Chenoa Farnsworth, the accelerator supports early-stage technology companies with mentorship, investment, and access to global networks. It is frequently cited as one of the "Top 20 Accelerators in the U.S.".

== History ==
Blue Startups was launched in 2012 to help diversify Hawaiʻi’s economy beyond tourism and defense. Henk Rogers, best known for bringing Tetris to Nintendo, teamed with Chenoa Farnsworth, a longtime investor in Hawaiʻi, and Maya Rogers to create the accelerator.

The accelerator has been recognized in TechCrunch accelerator rankings and receives public-private support from the State of Hawaiʻi through the Hawaiʻi Technology Development Corporation.

== Program ==
Blue Startups runs a cohort program of 12 weeks for up to 10 companies per session. Founders receive seed funding, co-working space, mentorship, investor introductions, and access to a network of more than 250 mentors across Asia and the U.S.

Each cohort culminates in Demo Days in Honolulu and Silicon Valley, where startups pitch to investors. The accelerator also runs cultural immersion activities, workshops, and investor mixers.

== Focus ==
The accelerator is sector-agnostic but emphasizes:

- Software and internet companies
- Travel and tourism technology
- Gaming and creative media
- "East Meets West" – Startups that operate between Asia and the United States on both sides of the Pacific
- Ocean (i.e., oceanography, aquaculture, and other ocean-related technologies)

Blue Startups has a goal of 50% gender diversity in its cohorts, meaning that half of cohort companies are founded by women.

== Notable alumni ==
Since its founding, Blue Startups has invested in dozens of companies. Notable alumni include:

- Volta Charging, an electric vehicle charging company that went public on the New York Stock Exchange in 2021.
- Flowater, water refill stations with advanced purification.
- dataplor, the leading provider of global location intelligence.
- Instant Teams, a staffing platform for military spouses.

Collectively, portfolio companies have raised more than US$500 million in follow-on funding.

== Events and community ==
Blue Startups hosts the annual East Meets West Conference, launched in 2015, which brings together investors and entrepreneurs from Asia, Hawaiʻi, and North America. It also participates in Honolulu Tech Week and organizes local mentorship and networking events.

== Leadership ==
- Chenoa Farnsworth – Co-founder and Managing Partner, venture capitalist.
- Henk Rogers – Co-founder, entrepreneur, and clean energy advocate.
- Maya Rogers – Co-founder, CEO at the Tetris Company.
