= Legalization Nation =

Documentary comic strip

- Author: Box Brown

Legalization Nation is a syndicated American "documentary comic strip" by Box Brown about the legalization of cannabis. It was picked up for syndication by King Features Syndicate in 2022.
