= Welltris =

1989 video game

- North American Macintosh box art
- Developers: Doka; Sphere; Bullet-Proof Software
- Publishers: EU: Infogrames; NA: Spectrum HoloByte
- Designers: Alexey Pajitnov; Andrei Snegov
- Series: Tetris
- Platforms: Amiga, Amstrad CPC, Atari ST, ZX Spectrum, Commodore 64, MS-DOS, Macintosh, arcade
- Release: MS-DOS; 1989; Amiga, Amstrad, Atari ST, Mac; 1990; Arcade, C64, Spectrum; 1991; PC-98; 1992
- Genre: Puzzle
- Mode: single-player

Welltris is a puzzle video game developed by Doka and licensed to Bullet-Proof Software. It is an official game in the Tetris series. Adaptations were made by Sphere, Inc. for Spectrum HoloByte. It was released for MS-DOS compatible operating systems in 1989. Ports for Macintosh, Amiga, Amstrad CPC, and Atari ST followed in 1990, then ZX Spectrum and Commodore 64 in 1991.

== Gameplay ==
Welltris was the first Tetris sequel designed by original designer Alexey Pajitnov, with Andrei Snegov. It retains that game's falling-block puzzle gameplay but extends the pit into three dimensions while the blocks remain two-dimensional, with the board viewed from above.

As blocks descend into the well, they can be rotated or moved left or right along the walls, from one wall to another if desired. Once a block reaches the floor (an 8×8 square), it will slide as far as possible until stopped by an edge or another piece. Whenever the player completes a solid horizontal or vertical line, it disappears and the remaining squares slide to fill the open space.

If a falling block comes to rest with any part of itself still on a wall, that wall is temporarily frozen; no blocks can be moved onto it during this time. Freezing all four walls ends the game.

== Development ==
Welltris was inspired by another puzzle game titled Blockout (1989). Alexey Pajitnov said he did not like the game, stating that its wireframed blocks only showed the edges and that he "thought a lot about how it could be possible to it myself. I decided to essentially make Welltris a 2D game with real strong sense of 3D by having flat pieces fall down the surface of the walls."

== Release and reception ==
Reception

Review score
Publication	Score
AllGame	3.5/5

Welltris was originally released for MS-DOS and Apple Mac and later ported to 8-bit and 16-bit home computers.

In 1990, Dragon gave the Macintosh IIx version of the game 5 out of 5 stars. MacUser reviewed the Macintosh version of Welltris, praising the new playstyle as compared to its predecessor, and called it both "thoughtful" and "highly addictive". Macworld also reviewed the Mac version, praising its gameplay, music and graphics, but criticized the steep learning curve and a point in the game where the speed of the falling pieces become unmanagable, referring to the latter as the "one annoying habit" that it shares with Tetris.

The ZX Spectrum version had mixed reviews, with CRASH awarding 79%, Sinclair User awarding 45% and Your Sinclair giving 79%. The actual gameplay and addictiveness were highlighted as good areas, but criticisms included the fiddly controls and minimal sound and looks.

The Commodore 64 version, with its more colourful graphics, received 80% from Zzap!64.

The MS-DOS version was later added to the 2024 game compilation Tetris Forever via a free update in December 2024.

== See also ==
- 3D Tetris
- Blockout
