= Counter Action =

1996 video game

- European cover art
- Developer(s): Nashi Igry
- Publisher(s): RU: Doka; EU: Mindscape
- Producer(s): Victor Vinokurov
- Programmer(s): Victor Streltsov
- Composer(s): Igor Rzheffkin
- Platform(s): MS-DOS
- Release: RU: 1996; EU: 1997
- Genre(s): Real-time tactics
- Mode(s): Single-player, multiplayer (expansion)

Counter Action (Note: Known in Russia as Confrontation (Russian: Противостояние) and in Germany as Eastern Front (German: Ostfront).) is a real-time tactics video game set in World War II. The game was developed by Russian studio Nashi Igry and published by Doka for MS-DOS in 1996. In the UK and Europe outside of Russia it was published by Mindscape in 1997.

== Gameplay ==
Counter Action is a real-time tactics game played from a top-down perspective. The game takes place during World War II and features two campaigns: one for the Soviet Union and one for the Third Reich. Each campaign consists of 14 missions. Counter Action does not use the mechanics of base building and resource management. The player can't produce new units, but is allowed to request reinforcements up to 4 times depending on the mission's rules.

== Reception ==
In Russia, Counter Action was critically well-received. Strana Igr's Sergey Losev wrote that it is "the best historical real-time game" and gave it a score of 8 out of 10. Toy Shop awarded the game with its Our Choice award. Outside of Russia Counter Action received a mixed to negative response from critics. In the British edition of PC Gamer, Steve Faragher gave the game 56% and pointed out that the game's game mechanics is similar to Command & Conquer. He also noted that in comparison to its closest competitor Close Combat, the game lacks historical accuracy. Luc-Santiago of the French magazine Gen4 gave the game two stars out of 5 and also compared it to Close Combat, but concluded that Counter Action's outdated gameplay cannot compete with it. PC Player's critic Manfred Duy gave a negative review for the game, criticizing its boring gameplay, sluggish controls, bad AI, and the unvaried green palette.

== Legacy ==
The game has one expansion pack, Burnt Snow (Russian: Опалённый снег), released in May 1997 in Russia. It expanded the original game with a multiplayer functionality, added 11 new single player scenarios set in winter, 45 multiplayer maps, several new units, and gameplay features. In 2001 Fireglow Games, a company formed by the former employees of Nashi Igry, released Sudden Strike, which was marketed in Russia as a direct sequel to Counter Action.
