= Sofia Lebedeva =

Russian actress

- Софья Лебедева
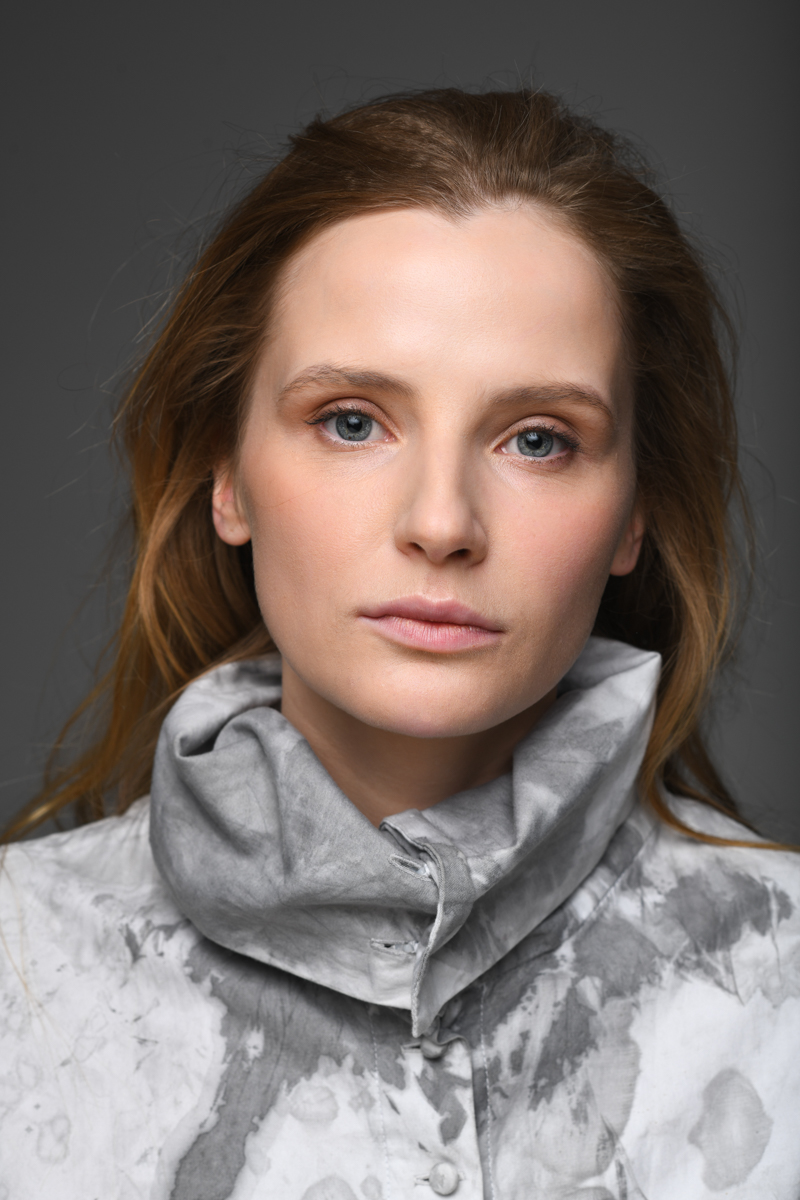
- Lebedeva in 2023
- Born: Sofia Sergeevna Lebedeva; 14 December 1993 (age 32); Obninsk, Kaluga Oblast, Russia
- Occupation: Actress
- Years active: 2008–present

Sofia Sergeevna Lebedeva (Russian: Со́фья Серге́евна Ле́бедева, also tr. Sofya Sergeevna Lebedeva; born 14 December 1993) is a Russian actress. She has had roles in BBC One drama McMafia (2018), Apple TV+ film Tetris (2023), and as Eleana and Empress Zoe in the Netflix series Vikings: Valhalla (2023–2024).

== Early life ==
Born in Obninsk in the Kaluga Oblast, Lebedeva trained for ten years in gymnastics. She was tutored to study at the Faculty of Global Studies at Moscow State University but instead she chose to go to drama school in Moscow.

== Career ==
In 2018 she appeared as Lyudmilla Nikolayeva, a trafficking victim in BBC television series McMafia. In 2023 she was seen as the enigmatic Sasha in the Apple TV+ drama Tetris. Her performance was described as “touching” by James Verniere in The Boston Herald.

That same year she had a recurring role as Eleana, in the second series of the Netflix historical drama Vikings: Valhalla, subsequently to become Empress Zoe in season three.

== Partial filmography ==
Key
| † | Denotes works that have not yet been released |

| Year | Title | Role | Notes |
|---|---|---|---|
| 2015 | Londongrad | Dunya | 1 episode |
| 2015 | The Dawns Here Are Quiet | Liza Brichkina | Film |
| 2018 | McMafia | Lyudmilla Nikolayeva | 7 episodes |
| 2018 | I Am Losing Weight | the bride | Film |
| 2020 | The Last Minister | Sonya Skvortsova | Lead role |
| 2022 | 1703 | Masha | 8 episodes |
| 2023 | Tetris | Sasha | Film |
| 2023-2024 | Vikings: Valhalla | Eleana / Empress Zoe | 11 episodes |
| 2025 | The Wizard of the Emerald City | Anna Smith | Based on the novel of the same name. |
