= Tetris Battle Gaiden =

1993 video game

- Developer: Bullet-Proof Software
- Publisher: Bullet-Proof Software
- Series: Tetris
- Platform: Super Famicom
- Release: JP: December 24, 1993
- Genre: Puzzle
- Modes: Single-player, multiplayer

Tetris Battle Gaiden (Note: Japanese: テトリス武闘外伝, Hepburn: Tetorisu Butō Gaiden) is a puzzle video game developed and published in 1993 by Bullet-Proof Software for the Super Famicom. Released only in Japan, the game is a variant of the Tetris series involving multiplayer battles comparable to those of the Puyo Puyo and Columns series of video games. The game received its first international release via the Tetris Forever (2024) video game compilation.

== Development ==
According to Alexey Pajitnov, the creator of the original Tetris, Tetris Battle Gaiden was "a rushed production". He expanded on this saying that "That kind of game needs three or four years just to balance it accurately and make it fun. The balancing of a game is part of the testing process and it's usually done on a very tight schedule." Pajitnov continued that he felt that Tetris Battle Gaiden was one the best of the early Tetris games.

== Release ==
Tetris Battle Gaiden was released for the Super Famicom on December 24, 1993. It received its first international release in 2024 as part of the Tetris Forever video game compilation.

== Reception ==
Reception

Review score
| Publication | Score |
|---|---|
| Famitsu | 8/10, 6/10, 7/10, 7/10 |

In the Japanese magazine Famitsu, reviewers complimented that there was still new and fun ways to make a game based on Tetris. Two reviewers said that the best elements focused on the battle mode with one reviewer saying that it was the most fun way to play since the Game Boy release of Tetris (1989). While one reviewer complimented visuals of the special attacks while another said they could use improvements in terms of gameplay. While one reviewer said that the main disappoinement was the game was still just Tetris in the long run, another said that matches tend to slightly overstay their welcome.

Tetris Battle Gaiden was Famitsu's highest rated puzzle game of 1993.
