= Doka (video game developer) =

Russian video game developer and publisher

DOKA Studios is a Russian video game developer and publisher. It is part of a larger consortium of Zelenograd companies created around scientific and technical creativity. This group was created under direction from the USSR government.

== Titles (incomplete) ==
- Welltris (1989)
- Shortline (1992)
- BabyType (1993)
- Sadko (1993)
- SeaBattle: Admiral Guardian (1994)
- Black Zone (1995)
- Total Control (1995)
- Counter Action (1996)
