= Zoology Building =

Building of University of Aberdeen, Scotland

Coordinates: 57.1679°N 2.1063°W

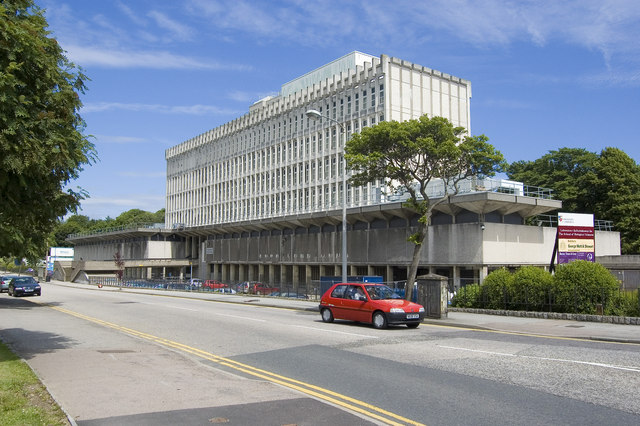
Exterior of the building

The Zoology Building is a facility owned by the University of Aberdeen. It is situated in Tillydrone, and is built in a brutalist style.

== History ==
During construction, the building collapsed on 1 November 1966. It had been expected to be completed by summer 1967. Eight people were trapped in the collapse, five of them died. Clearing of the site started in February 1967, and was completed in April.

The present building was constructed on the same plot and is of a similar design. Plans were approved in September 1967. The present building opened in 1970.

The building was also featured in Tetris depicting a Soviet Russian government building.

== Zoology Museum ==
The building contains the Zoology Museum. It holds various exhibits from the university's collections. Specimens range in age from the 1840s to the late 1970s. The only known egg from the Jerdon's courser was discovered in an uncatalogued drawer in the museum in 2013. The discovery was confirmed with DNA testing.
