= Cannabis: The Illegalization of Weed in America =

2019 nonfiction graphic novel by Box Brown

- Author: Box Brown
- Language: English
- Genre: Non-fiction, graphic novel
- Published: 2019
- Publisher: First Second Books
- Publication place: United States
- Pages: 244
- ISBN: 9781250154088
- OCLC: 1028217174

Cannabis: The Illegalization of Weed in America is a 2019 nonfiction graphic novel by Box Brown.

Publishers Weekly found it to be a "useful" historical review that "finds the drug's restriction is based on racism and falsehoods", and that it "will inform anyone curious about cannabis’s history in America". NPR's review said Brown's story presentation and technique provided "perfect support for stories freighted with layers of misinformation and irony" like this examination of "the drug's history and the century-long, globe-spanning crusade against" cannabis. Hollywood Reporter's review noted how Brown showed the pseudo-scientific studies that justified the initial U.S. prohibition were "strange and wonderful things — especially when they were exploring such hot-button topics as the effect that cannabis use has on people in an era when Reefer Madness was taken seriously as a cautionary tale".

== See also ==
- List of books about cannabis
