= Volta Charging =

U.S. EV charging company owned by Shell

Volta Charging, LLC
- Traded as: NYSE: VLTA
- Industry: Electric vehicle infrastructure
- Founded: 2010; 16 years ago in Hawaii
- Founders: Scott Mercer; Christopher Ching; Michael Menendez; Chris Wendel
- Headquarters: 155 de Haro Street, San Francisco, California, United States
- Key people: Vince Cubbage (Interim CEO); Brandt Hastings (Chief Commercial Officer); Drew Lipsher (Chief Development Officer); Francois Chadwick (Chief Financial Officer)
- Parent: Independent (2010–23); Shell (2023–2025)
- Website: voltacharging.com

Volta Charging was an American electric vehicle infrastructure company. As of September 2021, the company had installed more than 2,000 charging stations in twenty-three U.S. states.

Volta charging stations were compatible with all major plug-in hybrid and battery electric vehicle types in the United States and had a digital screen featuring advertisements. Generally, charging a vehicle at a Volta station was free, because Volta was supported by advertisements.

On March 31, 2023, Shell USA acquired the company for approximately $169 million.

On August 4, 2025, Shell informed Volta employees that it would shut down the company and dismantle all charging stations by the end of the year; instead Volta was acquired by Australian company Jolt in November 2025.

== History ==
Volta Charging was founded in Hawaii in 2010 by Scott Mercer, Christopher Ching, Michael Menendez, and Chris Wendel. Leonardo DiCaprio was an early investor in the company.

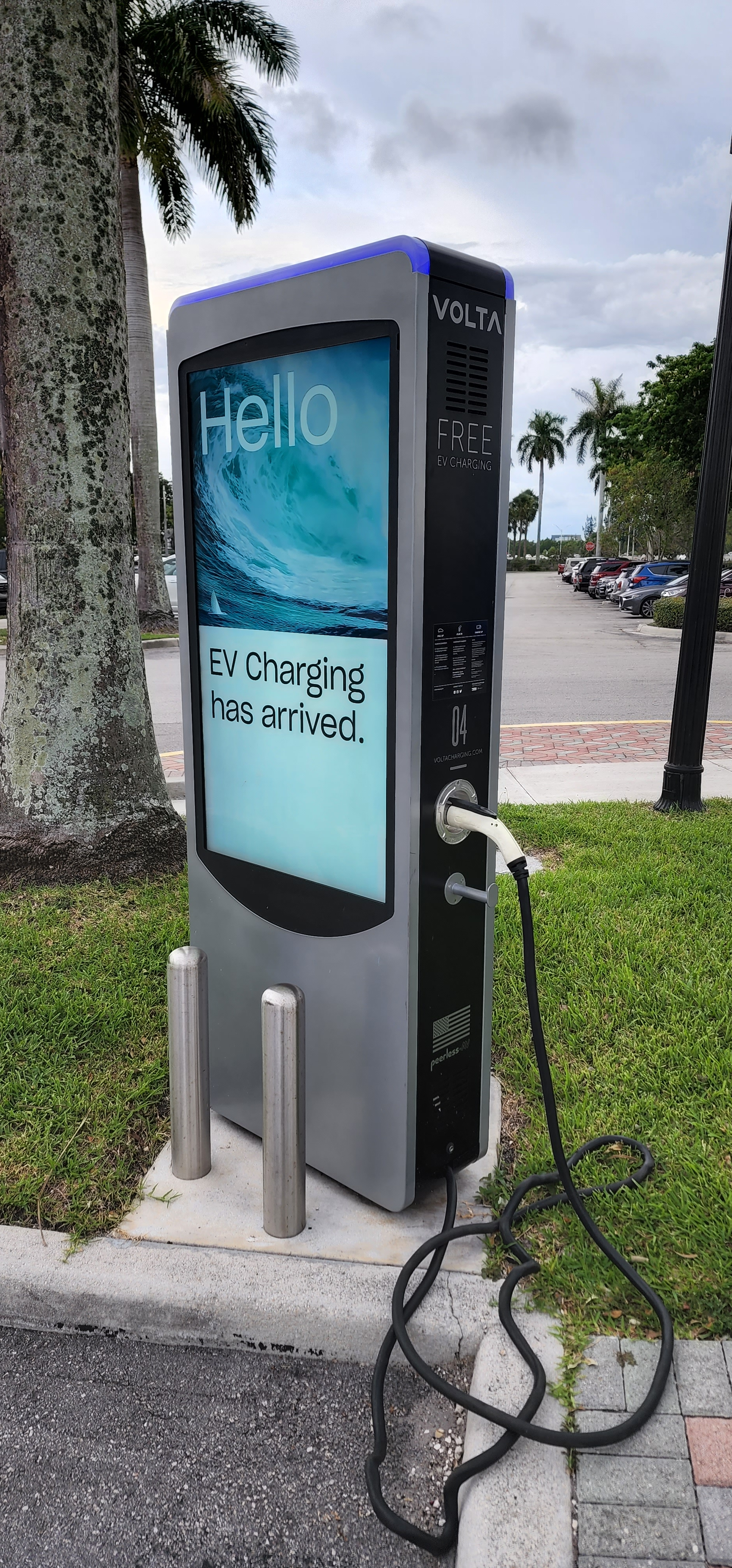
Volta charging station in Boca Raton, Florida

In February 2021, it announced a special-purpose acquisition company merger with Tortoise Acquisition Company II. After completing the merger, Volta went public on the New York Stock Exchange on August 27, 2021.

By September 2021, the company had installed more than 2,000 charging stations in twenty-three U.S. states. In November, Volta partnered with Topgolf to install charging stations at Topgolf entertainment centers across the United States.

In the third financial quarter of 2021, Volta's revenues increased 77 percent year-over-year to $8.5 million. In March 2023 the company was acquired by Shell USA in an all-cash deal.

== See also ==
- Charging station
- Plug-in vehicle
- Plug-in hybrid vehicle
