= Dan Ackerman =

American videogame journalist (born 1974)

- Born: March 13, 1974 (age 52)
- Education: University of Buffalo
- Occupation: Journalist
- Spouse: Libe Goad
- Children: 1
- Website: www.danackerman.com

Dan Ackerman (born March 13, 1974) is a former radio DJ turned technology and video game journalist. Ackerman resides in New York City, and has written about video games and gadgets for publications including SPIN, Blender, WWE Magazine, and The Hollywood Reporter.

He has been editor-in-chief at Micro Center since 2023, where he started a tech publication called Micro Center News. He is also a regular TV pundit on outlets such as G4TV, CNN, MSNBC, Fox News and CNBC.

Before joining Micro Center, Ackerman was the senior editor of Gizmodo in 2023, and had a long career at CNET, from 2005 to 2023, where he co-hosted CNET's weekly Digital City and CNET Labcasts video podcast. Before CNET, Ackerman was the editor-in-chief of Clubplanet.com from 2001 to 2005, and a senior editor at UGO.com from 1999 to 2001.

He has released four albums on the Helper Monkey Records label, including 2008's "Tales Out of Night School" and 2012's "The Futurist". He also appeared on a web show called, "Play Value", along with his wife, and other people in the video gaming industry. The show talked about the history of gaming such as "The Rise of Atari", or "The Death of The Arcade".

In August 2023, Ackerman filed a copyright infringement suit against the Apple TV 2023 film Tetris, for allegedly taking from his book The Tetris Effect: The Game that Hypnotized the World. The case was dismissed in 2025, though Ackerman stated he will seek an appeal.
