= Tetris: The Games People Play =

2016 graphic novel by Box Brown

- Author: Box Brown
- Subject: Graphic novel, history of video games
- Publisher: First Second Books
- Publication date: 2016

Tetris: The Games People Play is a 2016 graphic novel by Box Brown about the history of the video game Tetris. It was selected for the "Best 2016 Graphic Novels" panel at BookExpo America 2016.

== Bibliography ==
- McMillan, Graeme (October 11, 2016). "Check Out This Fantastic 'Tetris' Family Tree". Wired. ISSN 1059-1028.
- Narcisse, Evan (February 3, 2016). "Peek Inside the New Graphic Novel That Tells The Origin Story Of Tetris". Kotaku.
