= Elektronorgtechnica =

Defunct Soviet state-owned trading company

- Industry: Import/export of electronics
- Founded: 1971
- Defunct: 2005
- Fate: Sold to The Tetris Company in 2005
- Headquarters: Moscow, Russia
- Parent: Ministry of Foreign Trade of the USSR (until 1989)

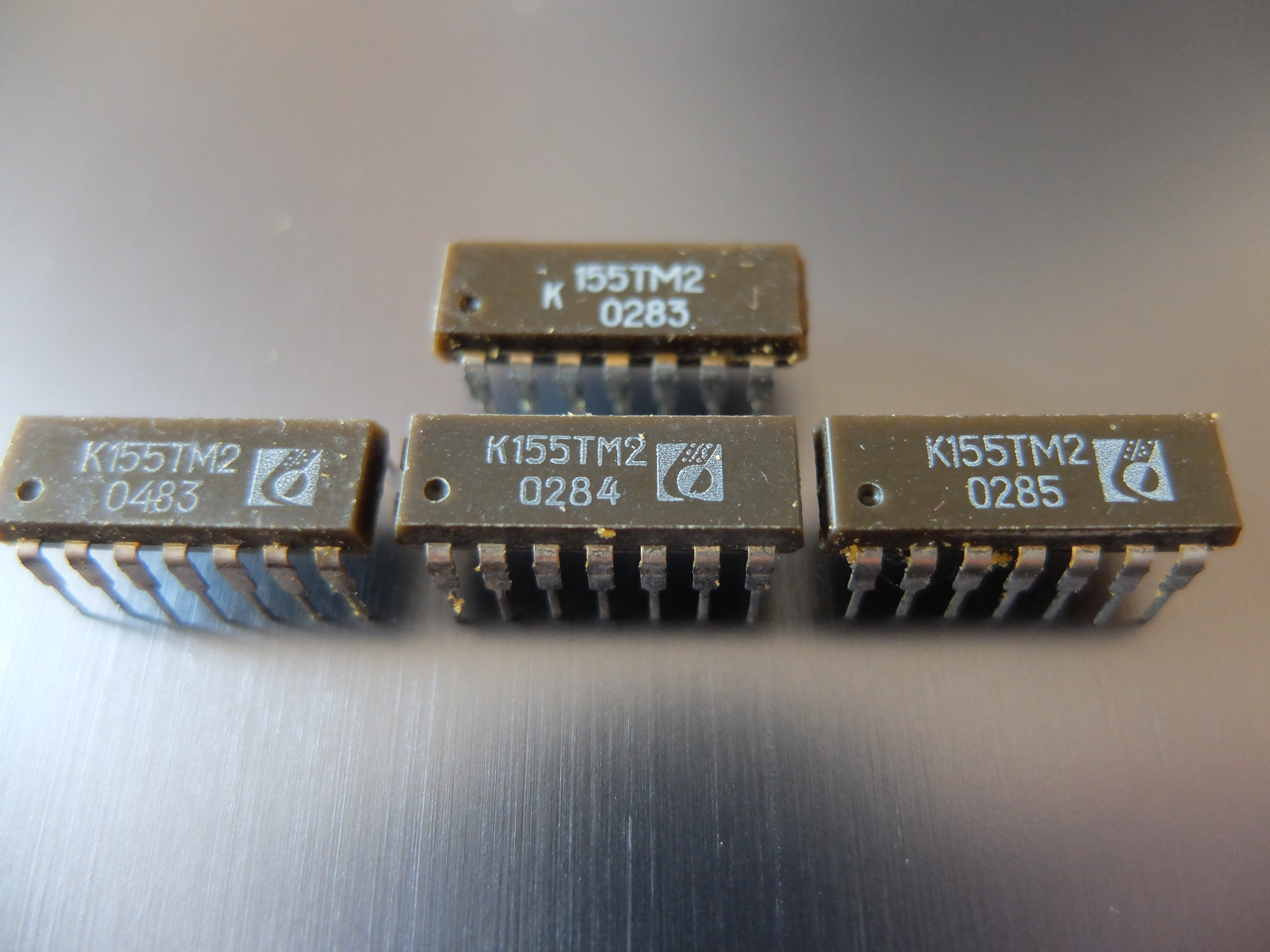
Integrated circuits with the logo of Elektronorgtechnika

Elektronorgtechnica (also spelled Electronorgtechnica, Russian: Всесою́зное Объедине́ние «Электро́норгтехника», romanized: Vsesoyúznoye Obyedinéniye "Elektrónorgtekhnika"), better known abbreviated as ELORG (Элорг), was a state-owned organization with a monopoly on the import and export of computer support and hardware and software in the Soviet Union. It was controlled by the Ministry of Foreign Trade of the USSR from 1971 to 1989.

The company was associated with the export of Soviet design calculators, Electronika being one brand that was exported, rebranding them as ELORG products. Elorg also marketed the Agat computer, and imported IBM computers into the Soviet Union, starting with the IBM System/360 Model 50 in 1971.

Robert Maxwell pressured Soviet Union leader Mikhail Gorbachev to cancel the contract between Elorg and Nintendo concerning the rights to the game franchise Tetris.

In 1991, as the Soviet Union was being dissolved, Elorg was turned into a private business by its director, Nikolai Belikov. Elorg was sold to The Tetris Company in January 2005 for $15 million.

== Tetris ==
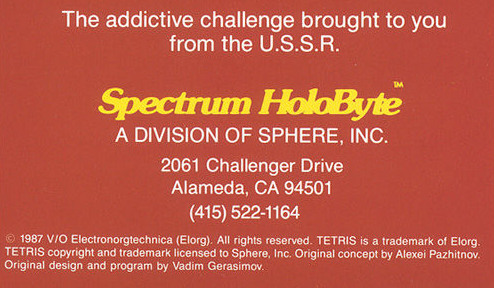
Elorg copyright notice on the back cover of the 1987 edition of Tetris

ELORG was responsible for the licensing of the popular video game series Tetris. Tetris was written by salaried programmers at the Soviet Academy of Sciences, which was not allowed to carry out commercial activities directly. As the game was owned by the state, all rights to the game worldwide were handled by ELORG. In 1996 ELORG was reportedly a privatised Russian company which retained the rights to the Tetris trademark.

ELORG was a partner in The Tetris Company which licenses the Tetris name to game companies, along with Tetris creator Alexey Pajitnov and businessman Henk Rogers. Elorg was a 50 percent owner in the company until Rogers and Pajitnov bought ELORG's remaining rights around 2005.
