= Tetris 2 + BomBliss =

1991 video game

- Family Computer box art
- Developer: Chunsoft
- Publisher: Bullet-Proof Software
- Director: Koichi Nakamura
- Producer: Tsunekazu Ishihara
- Designer: Akihiko Miura
- Programmers: Togo Narita; Masayoshi Saito
- Artists: Satoshi Fudaba; Kumiko Harada
- Composer: Koichi Sugiyama
- Series: Tetris
- Platform: Family Computer
- Release: JP: December 13, 1991
- Genre: Puzzle
- Modes: Single-player, multiplayer

Tetris 2 + BomBliss (Note: Japanese: テトリス２＋ボンブリス, Hepburn: Tetorisu 2 + Bonburisu) is a 1991 puzzle video game developed by Chunsoft and published by Bullet-Proof Software for the Family Computer. It is the final game Chunsoft developed for the Famicom.

== Gameplay ==
The game features two gameplay styles: standard Tetris and BomBliss.

In BomBliss, falling pieces contain bombs. Each piece may contain no bombs, one bomb, or be entirely made of bombs. When rows of the playfield are filled, they do not disappear as in other games; the bombs within the row explode depending on how many rows are filled at one time. It is possible for rows to be filled with no bombs, which increases the size of the next explosion. Whenever a piece enters the playfield, if four bombs are arranged into the shape of an O tetromino they will become a larger bomb. BomBliss uses the sticky style of line clear gravity, allowing pieces unconnected to anything to fall. This allows chain reactions.

== Development ==
Tsunekazu Ishihara was passionate of the Tetris series. At one point, he was heading to meet the game's founder, Alexey Pajitnov, at the USSR in order to have the rights to the Tetris intellectual property, but did it too late as Henk Rogers met the latter first. His passion for the franchise remained however, as Ishihara wrote a strategy guide called The Solution to Scoring 100,000 Points in Tetris, then later met with Koichi Nakamura, then president of the company Chunsoft. When the Famicom version was released, Ishihara and Nakamura were both unsatisfied with how that version of the game controlled. This would motivate them to discuss creating an improved version. The development of Tetris 2 + BomBliss started after Ishihara gathered Nakamura and Masanobu Endo, creating new rules that would later become the BomBliss side of the game. Rogers' company Bullet-Proof Software allowed the game to use the Tetris brand and a version of Tetris is included.

== Reception ==
Reception

Review scores
Publication	Score
Famitsu	7/10, 7/10, 6/10, 7/10 (Note: Each of the four reviewers in Famitsu graded the game on a ten point scale each.)
Hippon Super!	9/10, 7/10, 6/10

The four reviewers in Weekly Famitsu gave the game a positive review noting the increased value for including two games and that BomBliss gave the puzzle game an additional level of strategy. Some of the reviewers cautioned that owners of the original Famicom version of Tetris may not find it an essential purchase.

== Legacy ==
The meeting between Ishihara and Nakamura kickstarted the crossover between the Pokémon and Mystery Dungeon franchises decades after the release of Tetris 2 + BomBliss, making the spin-off game Pokémon Mystery Dungeon in 2005. A Super Famicom enhanced port, titled Super Tetris 2 + BomBliss, was later released in 1992. Both Tetris 2 + BomBliss and Super Tetris 2 + BomBliss are included in the video game compilation Tetris Forever (2024).

== See also ==
- List of Tetris variants
