= Tetris =

Puzzle video game

- Logo since 2019
- Designer: Alexey Pajitnov
- Platforms: List of Tetris variants
- Release: PC: USSR: 1985; EU: January 27, 1988; NA: January 29, 1988
- Genre: Puzzle
- Modes: Single-player; multiplayer

Tetris (Russian: Тетрис) (Note: Pronounced [ˈtʲetrʲɪs] or [ˈtetrʲɪs]) is a puzzle video game created by Alexey Pajitnov, a Soviet software engineer, in the mid-1980s. In Tetris, falling pieces made up of four connected blocks, known as tetrominoes, must be arranged into a stack. Once a horizontal line of the playfield is filled with blocks, the line disappears, granting points and clearing space. The objective is to score as many points as possible while keeping the stack from reaching the top, at which point the game ends. Approximately 220 versions of Tetris have been released across at least 70 platforms. Newer versions frequently add game mechanics, some of which have become standard over time, such as the ability to "hold" a tetromino for later use.

In the mid-1980s, Pajitnov created Tetris in his spare time while working at the Dorodnitsyn Computing Center of the Academy of Sciences. He initially programmed it in Pascal for the Elektronika 60 in about three weeks, then spent over two months porting it to the IBM PC using Turbo Pascal with help from Dmitry Pavlovsky and Vadim Gerasimov. Floppy disk copies were distributed freely throughout Moscow before spreading to Eastern Europe. Robert Stein of Andromeda Software saw Tetris in Hungary and contacted the Dorodnitsyn Computing Center to secure a license to release it commercially. Stein sublicensed it to Mirrorsoft in the UK and Spectrum HoloByte in the US. Both companies released Tetris in 1988 to commercial success and sublicensed to additional companies, including Henk Rogers' Bullet-Proof Software. Rogers negotiated with Nikolai Belikov, director of Elektronorgtechnica, the state-owned organization in charge of licensing Soviet software, to license Tetris to Nintendo for the Game Boy and Nintendo Entertainment System (NES); both versions were released in 1989.

Tetris for Game Boy contributed to the success of the Game Boy and popularized Tetris. To date, it is the best-selling version of Tetris, with over 35 million sales. After Nintendo's license to the game expired in 1995, Pajitnov claimed the rights to Tetris and established The Tetris Company alongside Rogers and, prior to 2003, Belikov. The company created guidelines for licensed Tetris games to follow and has enforced its copyright through cease-and-desist letters and DMCA takedowns against unauthorized clones. Versions of Tetris were released on mobile devices starting in the 2000s, with Electronic Arts holding a license on such ports from 2006 to 2020, to commercial success. The popularity of Tetris was renewed with the critically successful Tetris Effect (2018) and Tetris 99 (2019).

Tetris is the best-selling video game of all time, (Note: The BBC considers Minecraft to be the best-selling video game, rejecting the aggregated sales of Tetris and considering it to be a series, rather than a single video game; see List of best-selling video games for more information.) having sold 520 million copies as of 2022. It is frequently cited as one of the greatest and most influential games, and was among the inaugural class inducted into the World Video Game Hall of Fame in 2015. Its gameplay has been influential in the genre of puzzle video games, being cited as an early example of casual gaming. It has been represented in an array of media, such as architecture and art, and been the subject of academic research, including studies of its potential for psychological intervention. A competitive culture has formed around Tetris, particularly the NES version, with players – typically adolescents – competing at the annual Classic Tetris World Championship. A film dramatization of its development was released in 2023.

== Gameplay ==
The seven tetrominoes used in gameplay

Across its numerous versions, Tetris generally has a consistent puzzle video game design. Gameplay consists of a rectangular field in which pieces consisting of four connected blocks, called tetrominoes, (Note: The standard spelling in mathematics is tetrominoes, while the Tetris Company's trademarked spelling is tetriminoes. This article uses the standard spelling for consistency.) descend one at a time from the top-center. During the descent, the player can move the piece horizontally and rotate it until it touches the bottom of the field or another piece. The goal is to stack the pieces to create horizontal lines of blocks. When a line is completed, it disappears and the blocks placed above fall by one row. The speed of the descending pieces increases as lines are cleared. The game ends if the accumulated pieces in the field block other pieces from entering the field, a process known as "topping out". Common mechanics among Tetris versions include the queue (viewing the pieces that are next to appear), soft drop (increasing the descent of the piece), hard drop (instantly placing the piece as far down as it can go), and holding (reserving a piece for later use).

The objective of Tetris is to collect as many points as possible during a gameplay session by clearing lines. Tetris's scoring system has remained mostly consistent since Tetris DS (2006). Points gained during gameplay increase with the descent speed. The more lines cleared at once, the higher the score for a line clear. Completing four horizontal lines at once by placing an I-shaped tetromino into a single-column gap is referred to as a "Tetris"; most versions award the highest score for it. The player can also gain points by using hard drops or soft drops. Advanced techniques, often used in competitive play, include T-spins (spinning a T-shaped tetromino into a blocked gap), perfect clears (emptying the field following a line clear), and combos (clearing lines consecutively).

== History ==
=== Creation (1984–1985) ===
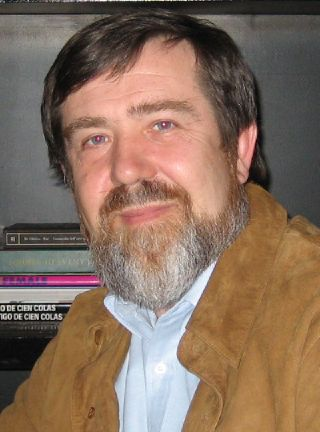
Alexey Pajitnov (pictured in 2008), the creator of Tetris

In the 1980s, Alexey Pajitnov was a Soviet speech recognition and artificial intelligence researcher at the Dorodnitsyn Computing Center of the Academy of Sciences who operated an Elektronika 60, a Russian clone of the PDP-11 computer. While at the center, he developed at least twenty types of video games in his spare time. Pajitnov bought a pentomino puzzle set from a store and played with it in his office, and he became inspired to adapt the puzzle game to the computer. On the Elektronica 60, Pajitnov experimented with different pentomino configurations. He felt that the game would be needlessly complicated with pentominoes and their twelve different shapes, so he scaled the concept down to tetrominoes, using seven different shapes. Pajitnov programmed Tetris using Pascal for the RT-11 operating system on the Elektronika 60. Because the Elektronika 60 had no graphical interface, Pajitnov represented the pieces using bracket and space characters. Afterward, he programmed the basic mechanics, including the ability to flip tetrominoes as they fell in a vertical screen and the clearing of lines. The name Tetris was coined by Pajitnov as a combination of "tetra" (meaning "four") and his favorite sport, tennis.

Pajitnov completed the first version of Tetris in about three weeks in the mid-1980s. (Note: Sources differ on the start and completion of the first version, with accounts placing its development in either 1984 or 1985. Since 2009, the Tetris Company has officially celebrated the game's anniversary based on a creation date of June 6, 1984. In a 2014 interview, Alexey Pajitnov said that he began experimenting with pentominoes on a computer in June 1984, and Henk Rogers wrote in 2024 that the game was developed in 1984, based on Pajitnov's recollection. Most accounts, however, place the creation of this version in 1985, including Pajitnov, who tentatively gave 1985 as the completion date in a 1993 interview, in which he also noted that development took about three weeks. A 2004 BBC documentary places the beginning of Pajitnov's experimentation with pentominoes on a computer in spring 1985.) The Elektronika 60 version had no scoring system and no levels, but it nonetheless captivated Pajitnov's peers, some of whom obtained copies of the completed code to run on their compatible work computers. Pajitnov sought to port Tetris to the IBM Personal Computer (IBM PC), which had a higher-quality display than the Elektronika 60. He recruited his colleague Dmitry Pavlovsky and the 16-year-old computer prodigy Vadim Gerasimov. The trio first developed other video games, some of which were imitations of games imported from the West. Using Turbo Pascal, the three eventually adapted Tetris to the IBM PC over the course of two months, with Gerasimov incorporating color and a timer-delay for the falling pieces and Pavlovsky incorporating a scoreboard.

Due to the Soviet government's ideology and its bureaucratic nature, Soviet copyright law did not protect the intellectual rights of individuals, nor did it allow them to derive income from their creations. As a result, Tetris was distributed through samizdat, which involved manually self-publishing copies of creative works to avoid censorship. The trio distributed free copies of their games, including Tetris, on tapes and floppy disks. Unauthorized clones of Tetris were created by Soviet computer hobbyists, who ported the game to other computers such as the Radio-86RK and the Electronika BK-0010. Pajitinov has since claimed that Tetris was widely successful in Moscow, stating "within two weeks, [Tetris] was on every computer in Moscow". Law professor Julien Mailland disputes this claim, noting that, at the time, the scarce number of computers in the Soviet Union meant that very few people would have played Tetris.

=== Spread beyond the Soviet Union (1986–1988) ===
The first version of Tetris, developed for the Elektronika 60 in the mid-1980s, is shown here running in emulation.

Pajitnov's manager Victor Brjabrin liked Tetris and sought opportunities for success beyond the Soviet Union. In early 1986, Brjabrin sent a copy of Tetris to the SZKI Institute of Computer Studies in Budapest. Robert Stein, founder of Andromeda Software who profited by licensing software from Hungary to UK companies, encountered Tetris during a visit to the SZKI Institute and found its gameplay compelling. Stein learned from the SZKI Institute director that a researcher there, Gábor Bolgár, had ported Tetris to the Commodore 64. Stein returned to London and contacted Dorodnitsyn Computing Center by telex to obtain the license rights, believing he could sell those rights to a larger UK publisher.

Brjabrin received the telex and, after translating it from English to Russian, disclosed it to Pajitnov, who spent days attempting to compose, translate to English, and send a favorable yet noncommittal response by telex to Stein. Despite this attempt, Stein interpreted the response as granting him the license and proceeded to find a publisher for Tetris. This would not have been a valid contract, as in the Soviet Union, only dedicated corporations authorized by the Ministry of Foreign Trade could enter into foreign trade agreements. The corporation authorized to conduct foreign trade of hardware and software was the state-run organization Elektronorgtechnica (Elorg). Despite this, Stein pitched Tetris to Jim Mackonochie of Mirrorsoft, a UK software company founded by business magnate Robert Maxwell and Mackonochie. Though Mackonochie was skeptical about the commercial potential of Tetris, he consulted Phil Adam, president of US sister company Spectrum HoloByte, for his input. During his overseas visit to Mirrorsoft, Adam played Tetris for hours and then encouraged Mackonochie to accept Stein's offer. Though still cautious, Mackonochie agreed to allow himself the licensing rights for Europe and Adam the rights for the United States and Japan. Stein sold the rights to the two companies for £3,000 and royalties of 7.5–15% of sales, even though negotiations with the Dorodnitsyn Computing Center were at a standstill, with the Dorodnitsyn Computing Center being resistant to selling Tetris in the West.

Gilman Louie, CEO of Spectrum HoloByte, sought to exoticize the game's Soviet origins, marketing it as the first Soviet product to be sold in North America, alongside implementing Soviet folk music and imagery during gameplay and using red packaging adorned with an illustration of Saint Basil's Cathedral. Tetris was first commercially released in the West for the IBM PC, with ports to other computer systems planned for release in the following weeks. Mirrorsoft released the game in the United Kingdom on January 27, 1988, and Spectrum HoloByte released it in the United States on January 29, 1988. They then ported the game to other computers, such as the Commodore 64, the Macintosh, the Amiga, and the Atari ST. Mirrorsoft's releases on platforms such as the Amiga and the Atari ST rewrote the code of the original IBM release. Boosted by word of mouth and positive reviews, this Tetris release was commercially successful, selling 100 thousand copies within a year. At the Software Publishers Association's Excellence in Software Awards ceremony in 1989, Tetris won across three categories.

Alexander Alexinko, director of Elorg, while visiting the Dorodnitsyn Computing Center, discovered Stein's negotiations with Pajitnov and assessed their communications with disapproval. In response, Elorg took over representing the Soviet Union in negotiations. Through communications, Alexinko attempted to revoke any potential deal the Soviet Union might have had with Stein in favor of having Elorg itself sell Tetris internationally. Stein responded by threatening to create a scandal that would harm the Soviet Union's international standing, persuading Alexinko to consider negotiating the rights to Tetris. An agreement was drafted by the end of February 1988 and finalized by May 10, granting Stein the rights to Tetris on computers. Licenses to handheld platforms and arcade machines were explicitly not granted, but consoles were not addressed. Because companies were beginning to sub-license Tetris to consoles, Stein chose to interpret the license to computers as broadly encompassing consoles.

=== International negotiations (1988–1989) ===
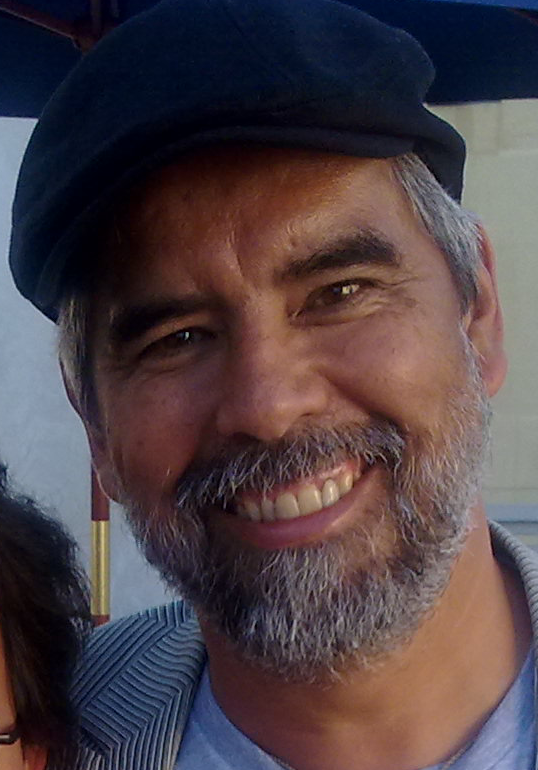
Henk Rogers (pictured in 2010), representing Nintendo, negotiated with Elorg for the rights to Tetris.

Following the commercial release of Tetris, Spectrum HoloByte and Mirrorsoft started licensing the game to other companies for platforms that were not covered by the contract that Stein and Elorg had agreed to. At the time, Henk Rogers had been seeking video games across the world to sell in Japan through his company Bullet-Proof Software; he discovered Tetris as a publicly displayed video game at the 1988 Winter Consumer Electronics Show (CES). Mirrorsoft sold Atari Games subsidiary Tengen the rights to sell non-computer releases of Tetris in Japan in exchange for the rights to sell computer ports of Blasteroids worldwide. Afterward, Tengen sold the Japanese arcade rights to Sega and the console rights to Rogers, who received the Japanese computer rights from Spectrum HoloByte. Bullet-Proof Software released Tetris for Japanese computers in November 1988 and Nintendo's Family Computer (Famicom) in December 1988, the latter of which became commercially successful, selling 130,000 within a month. Despite this, Elorg was unaware of the Famicom version and was receiving no royalties from Stein for Tetris's worldwide success.

Around the time of Tetris's Famicom version, Nintendo developed the Game Boy, an economical handheld game console that interested Nintendo president Hiroshi Yamauchi and Nintendo of America president Minoru Arakawa. Arakawa, aided by Nintendo of America vice president Howard Lincoln, sought to port Tetris to the Game Boy, believing that it would be a commercial success. They were both discouraged by the convoluted nature of the game's legal rights, leading Arakawa to enlist Rogers in getting the handheld rights to Tetris. Rogers contacted Stein by fax on November 15, 1988, for the handheld rights, with Stein responding that he was negotiating them with Elorg. At the time, Alexinko had been replaced by the more adversarial Evgeni Belikov as director of Elorg. Belikov refused to grant Stein the handheld and arcade rights to Tetris due to his failure to pay his royalties, forcing Stein to stall Rogers. Rogers eventually abandoned Stein after failing to receive the rights in favor of negotiating directly with the Soviet government. In February 1989, Rogers traveled to the Soviet Union and arrived at the Elorg offices uninvited to negotiate the rights. Discussions with Rogers were scheduled the next and following days.

While trying to persuade Elorg to grant him the handheld rights, Rogers displayed a Famicom Tetris cartridge to demonstrate the game's success. Belikov did not recognize the cartridge, believing that the rights to Tetris had only been signed for computer systems per the contract with Stein, and accused Rogers of illegal publication. Though surprised, Rogers provided a check of over $40,000 to Elorg as to remedy this breach of contract and discussed granting him the console rights. Afterward, Belikov recognized the potential financial benefits of allying with Rogers over the other incoming negotiators: Stein and Robert's son Kevin Maxwell. While Rogers was consulting Nintendo for a potential offer to Elorg, Belikov implicitly diminished Stein and Kevin's standing in subsequent meetings by coercing the former into signing an updated contract with an exclusionary definition of computers and baiting the latter into admitting that Mirrorsoft did not have the console rights, unaware of the commercial Famicom release, Rogers, alongside Arakawa and Lincoln, returned to Moscow, and after a few days of negotiation, Nintendo received a 5 year license, with a one year optional extension, to both the handheld and console releases to Tetris from Elorg.

=== Legal battles and aftermath (1989–1993) ===
On March 31, 1989, taking advantage of the new agreement, Lincoln sent a cease and desist fax to Hideyuki Nakajima, president of Atari Games, concerning their subsidiary Tengen's production of Tetris for the Nintendo Entertainment System (NES), the North American equivalent to the Famicom. Believing themselves to own the console rights to Tetris, Tengen filed copyright applications for the game in the United States and preemptively sued Nintendo. Meanwhile, after being informed by Kevin, Robert pressured Elorg for sidestepping prior agreements with his companies by contacting ministers from both the Soviet and UK governments. In an urban legend, one that Rogers disputes occurred, in an in-person meeting, Robert informed Soviet General Secretary Mikhail Gorbachev of his situation regarding Tetris, to which he responded that Robert "should no longer worry about the Japanese company". Despite pressure from both Robert and the Soviet government, Belikov stated his refusal to concede in a conversation with Lincoln.

After a marketing campaign ordered by Nakajima, Tengen released their version of Tetris on the NES on May 17, 1989, selling tens of thousands of copies within a few weeks. The next month, Judge Fern M. Smith of the US District Court for the Northern District of California presided over competing lawsuits from Atari Games and Nintendo over their console rights to Tetris. Both companies motioned for preliminary injunctions that would prohibit the other company from selling Tetris. On June 15, 1989, in defense of its motion for injunction, Atari Games argued that the NES fell under the definition of computers under the original contract and that Elorg only excluded consoles from its definition of computers to take advantage of higher profits from Nintendo. Based on contradicting evidence, Smith rejected this argument and declared that Mirrorsoft and Spectrum HoloByte had never received explicit authorization for marketing on consoles, granting a preliminary injunction against Atari Games on June 22.

The next day, Atari Games withdrew its NES version from sale, and thousands of cartridges remained unsold in its warehouses. Preference for this release over Nintendo's led to Atari Games cartridges selling for up to $300 on the secondary market. The Game Boy version of Tetris was released in Japan on June 14, 1989, and as a pack-in game in the United States on July 31, 1989. Nintendo's NES version was released the same year. Both releases achieved commercial success. Tetris was the primary game promoted for the Game Boy, becoming its killer app. It generated $80 million in revenue and popularized both the Game Boy and Tetris. The NES version quickly sold three million copies and appeared on Nintendo's most popular games list for over a year.

On November 13, 1989, Smith ended the legal battle between Nintendo and Atari Games regarding Tetris before trial by a verbal summary judgment, granting Nintendo the console rights to Tetris. She issued a formal summary judgment on April 23, 1990, rejecting Tengen's claims that the NES and the Famicom could be considered computers under Elorg's contract with Stein. In 1991, with Rogers' help, Pajitnov and his family emigrated to Seattle, where he worked as a freelance game designer. Around this time, Pajitnov worked on several sequels to Tetris. Welltris (1990) involved adjusting geometrical pieces descending down one of four walls of a three-dimensional well, and Hatris (1990) and Faces...tris III (1991) replaced descending tetrominoes with hats and faces respectively. Though they generally received positive reviews and commercial success, with Faces...Tris III winning "Best Action/Arcade Program" in the 1991 Excellence in Software Awards, none replicated Tetris' success, due to them being more complicated. Other early versions and sequels of Tetris were developed without Pajitnov's involvement, including Spectrum Holobyte's Super Tetris (1991), Bullet-Proof Software's Tetris 2 + BomBliss (1991) and Tetris Battle Gaiden (1993), and Nintendo's Tetris 2 (1993).

=== The Tetris Company and Blue Planet Software (1995–2012) ===
After Nintendo's license to Tetris expired in 1995, Pajitnov and Belikov attempted to claim rights to the game. Belikov claimed that, in the wake of the 1991 collapse of the Soviet Union, he owned a company named the Elorg Company, LLC, in Delaware that was the "successor-in-interest" to Soviet Elorg and thus owned the rights to Tetris, a claim that is difficult to verify. Pajitnov's theory on his ownership relies on an alleged agreement from when he first created Tetris. According to Pajitnov, he arranged for the Dorodnitsyn Computing Center to have the rights to Tetris for ten years to ease potential legal troubles, which would expire at the end of 1995, reverting back to Pajitnov. Mailland disputes this story, as the Soviet Union did not recognize intellectual property rights and Pajitnov's creations would have been owned by the state. The earliest documents attesting to Pajitnov's claims are sworn affirmations by Pajitnov prepared by Nintendo in 1989.

Rogers formed Blue Planet Software and, on January 1, 1996, made a formal agreement with Pajitnov to license Tetris to the new company. To avoid litigation, Rogers and Belikov founded and established an equal partnership in The Tetris Company. The Tetris Company created quality and consistency guidelines for Tetris games and a "minimum specification" that licensed games must follow, and Blue Planet Software served as the agent for Tetris. Afterward, The Tetris Company started issuing cease-and-desist letters to independent developers for unauthorized clones of Tetris. Tensions between Belikov and Rogers led to them dissolving the partnership in 2003. When Belikov attempted to claim the rights to himself, Rogers sued Belikov in the US District Court for the Southern District of New York. After their motions for preliminary injunctions failed, the two settled upon realizing the financial cost of litigation, with Belikov giving up the rights in exchange for $15 million. Because of the settlement, the question of ownership was not litigated, and because the Russian Federation, the successor state to the Soviet Union, never contested either party's claims, Pajitnov and Rogers officially remain the copyright owners of Tetris.

From the formation of The Tetris Company onward, Pajitnov and Rogers sought to keep Tetris versions fresh and innovative. Tetrisphere, developed by H2O Entertainment and released on August 11, 1997, was an example of this innovation. Gameplay involved rotating a three-dimensional sphere to place pieces on its surface. On other platforms around this time, Tetris Plus (1996), Tetris DX (1998), and The Next Tetris (1999) added new game modes, and Tetris: The Grand Master (1998) was an arcade game aimed at experienced players. According to Rogers, in order to appeal to beginner players, the Tetris Company started to incorporate features not in the original releases into the Tetris guidelines. Features that became common in later Tetris versions included the hold feature and ability to perform both soft drops and hard drops in The New Tetris in 1999, the easy spin and super rotation system in Tetris Worlds in 2001, and the scoring system introduced in Tetris DS in 2006. Critics panned Tetris Worlds for the easy spin mechanic, which allowed players to delay a piece's descent by continually rotating it. Despite the controversy and Pajitnov's reluctance, the mechanic was implemented into the Tetris guidelines.

Tetris was first released on mobile devices in 2001 by G-Mode. In 2002, Rogers formed Blue Lava Wireless to develop Tetris games for mobile platforms. JAMDAT acquired Blue Lava Wireless in April 2005, granting the former a 15-year license of Tetris for mobile platforms. By December 2005, when Electronic Arts (EA) started its acquisition of JAMDAT, Tetris had been consistently selling well on American carrier phones. EA completed its acquisition in February 2006, granting it the mobile license for Tetris. EA Mobile released their mobile version of Tetris as a launch game for the iTunes store on iPod 5G on September 11, 2006, and on the Apple App Store on iOS on July 10, 2008. By January 2010, EA's mobile releases reached 100 million paid downloads, making Tetris the most popular mobile game at the time. From the late-2000s onward, The Tetris Company enforced its copyright of Tetris against unauthorized clones on mobile platforms through DMCA takedowns. This culminated in the 2012 case Tetris Holding, LLC v. Xio Interactive, Inc. in the United States District Court for the District of New Jersey, where Judge Freda L. Wolfson ruled that the iOS game Mino violated Tetris's copyright by substantially imitating its look and feel, setting a legal precedent for The Tetris Company to continue issuing DMCA takedowns to unauthorized clones.

=== Maya Rogers' succession and resurgence of popularity (2014–present) ===
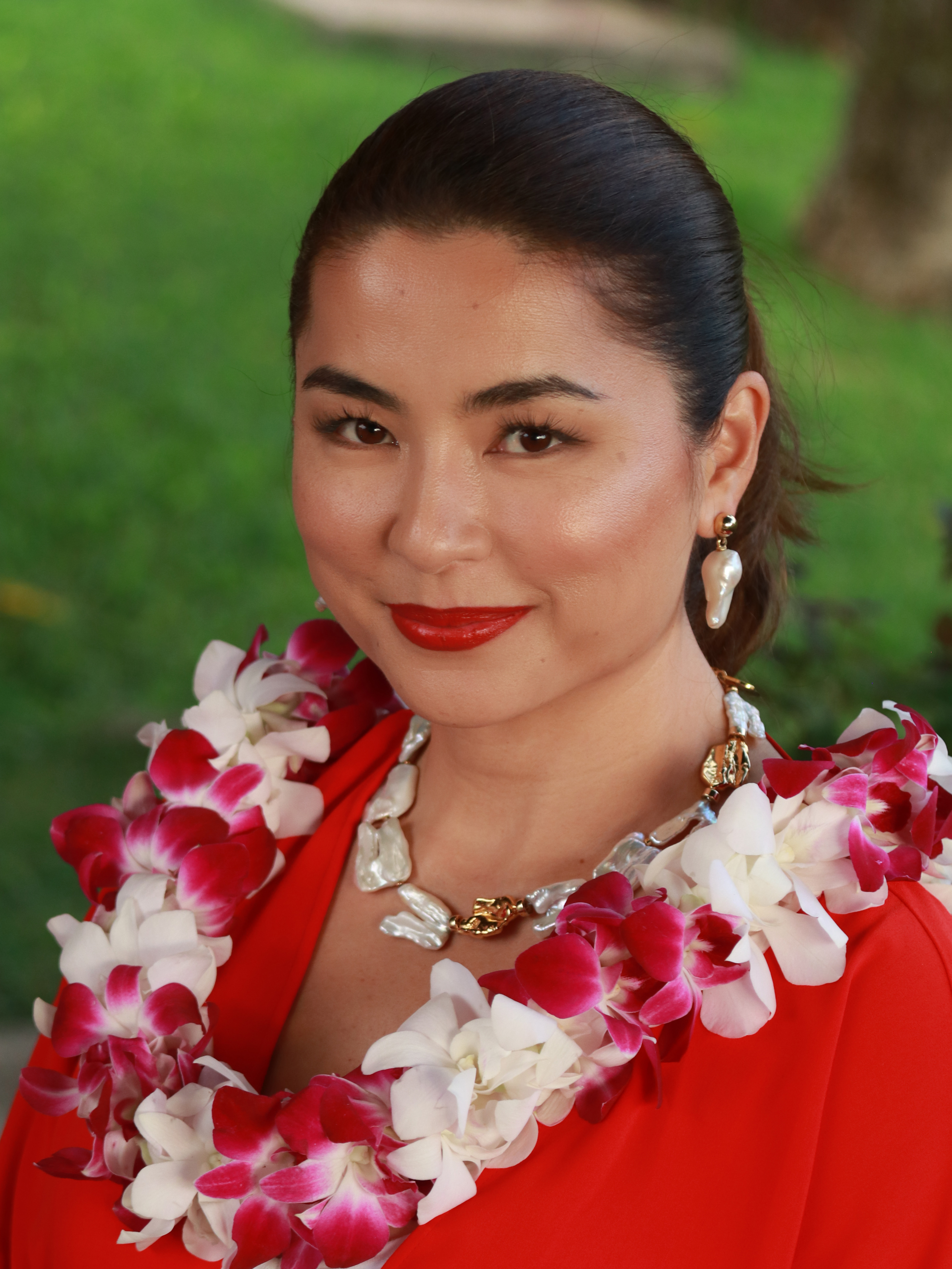
Maya Rogers (pictured in 2022) succeeded her father as CEO of Blue Planet Software in January 2014.

In January 2014, after eight years of involvement, Henk Rogers' daughter Maya succeeded him as the CEO of Blue Planet Software. (Note: An October 2020 press release announced that Blue Planet Software was renamed to Tetris. To date, Henk is officially the president of the Tetris Company, while Maya is the president and CEO of Tetris, Inc.) She began by planning activities for Tetris's 30th anniversary. In an interview with VentureBeat in June 2014, Maya spoke of her desire to expand Tetris's brand, such as through merchandising, and keeping the game fresh. Sega released Puyo Puyo Tetris, a crossover between Tetris and Puyo Puyo, in Japan on February 6, 2014, for multiple platforms. Puyo Puyo Tetris sold over 60,000 copies within a week, with the Nintendo 3DS port being the second-highest-selling game of the week according to 4Gamer.net. Ubisoft's Tetris Ultimate was released on the Nintendo 3DS in November 2014 and the PlayStation 4 and Xbox One in December 2014. Tetris Ultimate received mixed reviews, though the online multiplayer was generally seen favorably.

In the late 2010s, Tetris had a resurgence in popularity with the release of Tetris Effect and Tetris 99. (Note: Attributed to multiple sources:) PCMag credited the resurgence to the 2017 release of Puyo Puyo Tetris in the Western world, where it received positive reviews and sold 1.4 million copies worldwide by November 2020. Tetris Effect, developed by Monstars and Resonair and published by Enhance Games, was released on the PlayStation 4 on November 9, 2018, and on Windows on July 23, 2019, receiving widespread critical acclaim for its visuals and emotional impact. Tetris 99 is a battle royale version of Tetris made available to subscribers of Nintendo Switch Online on February 13, 2019, upon its surprise announcement during Nintendo Direct. It received positive reviews and became Nintendo Switch Online's killer app; according to President of Nintendo Shuntaro Furukawa, 2.8 million Nintendo Switch Online users played Tetris 99 within a few months of release.

EA announced in January 2020 that its license for mobile releases of Tetris would expire on April 21, 2020, with the game becoming inoperable as a result. Video game developer N3twork subsequently released authorized mobile releases on the iOS and Android on January 23, 2020. These accumulated 30 million downloads before social casino company PlayStudios acquired the rights to them in November 2021. On March 28, 2023, Playstudios incorporated a playAwards loyalty program onto the Tetris mobile apps, allowing players to win points for playing Tetris that can be redeemed for real-life awards such as for traveling and leisure. Tetris Forever, a compilation of Tetris games and interactive documentary developed by Digital Eclipse, was released on November 12, 2024, to positive reviews for chronicling the history of Tetris.

On September 3, 2026, the second Trump administration of the United States released the website Arcade.gov, consisting of MAGA-themed browser games modeled after pre-existing video games. One of these games was a Tetris clone titled Build the Wall, which tasked the player with using tetrominoes to fortify the Mexico–United States border wall in order to prevent immigrants from breaching the wall. A day later, The Tetris Company issued a statement on social media that denied being involved with the game's creation and accused the administration of copyright infringement. They also stated, "At Tetris we believe in the power of connection and bringing people together, not dividing them." Following this statement, the administration removed Build the Wall from the website on September 8.

== Versions ==
Tetris has been released on multiple platforms, including game consoles, personal computers, and smartphones. Pajitnov said there are hundreds of versions of Tetris. Guinness World Records recognizes Tetris as the most ported video game, having appeared on at least 70 platforms, and as the video game with the most distinct versions (approximately 220 official), each featuring unique elements such as music and images. In addition to official versions, Tetris clones have also been produced for handheld devices, keychains, and mobile phones. One example is Brick Game, an inexpensive handheld clone that appeared in China around 1991 and became popular there and in several other countries during the 1990s.

The core gameplay has remained consistent. Since 1996, the Tetris Company has maintained annual standard specifications for authorized versions of Tetris. Pajitnov considers these guidelines a baseline for different versions and not "set in stone". Several game mechanics of Tetris have been changed over time. For example, the distribution of tetrominoes was completely randomized in early versions, while modern versions use a "bag system", in which each tetromino is guaranteed to appear once in a set of seven. Other mechanics that have become standardized in modern versions include the ability to hold tetrominoes to swap with later pieces, introduced in The New Tetris (1999), and the super rotation system and infinite spin, introduced in Tetris Worlds (2001).

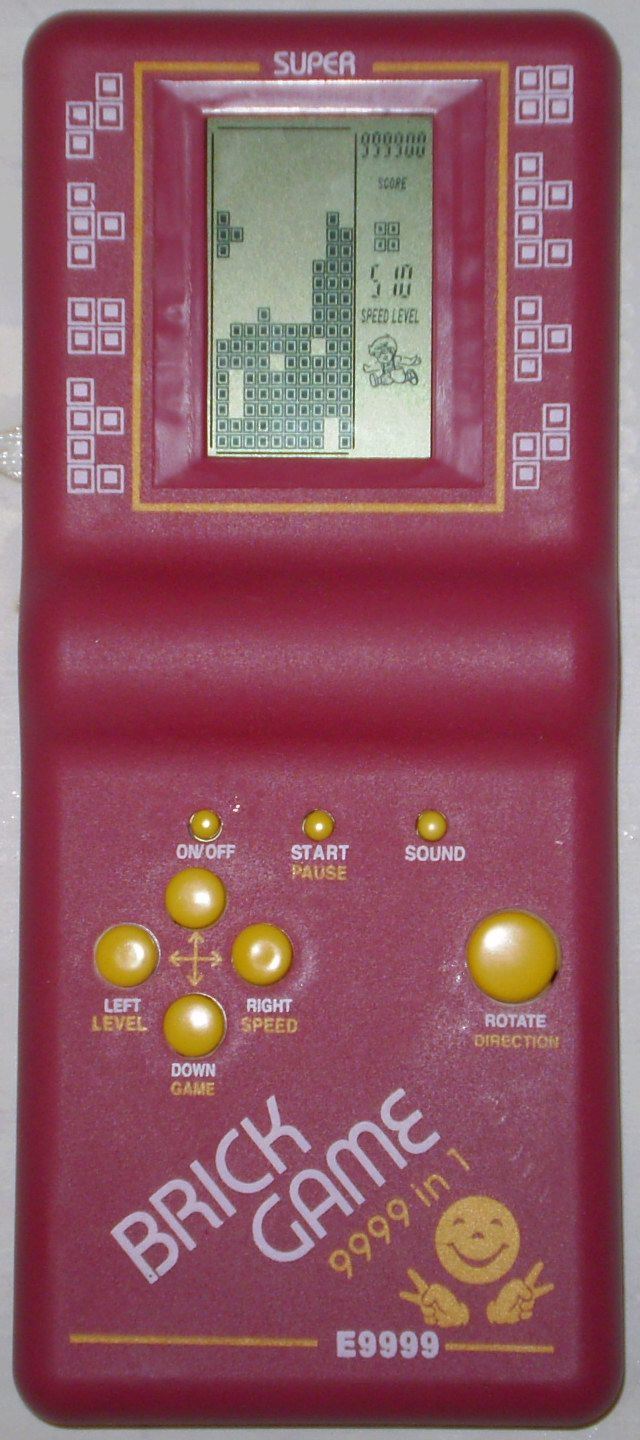
A handheld Tetris clone

The original Elektronika 60 version of Tetris had no music. Spectrum Holobyte's version of Tetris in the United States exoticized the Soviet origins through elements such as Russian music, including Pyotr Ilyich Tchaikovsky's "Trepak" from The Nutcracker and Reinhold Glière's "Russian Sailor Dance" from The Red Poppy. This approach differed from other versions of Tetris from other countries at the time: Mirrorsoft's Commodore 64 version in Europe used an atmospheric soundtrack, and Sega's arcade version in Japan used a synthesized pop-influenced soundtrack. Nintendo's versions for NES and Game Boy continued the pattern of using Russian music. The NES version uses Tchaikovsky's "Dance of the Sugar Plum Fairy" from The Nutcracker as Music A, with the Russian-influenced Music B and the mellow Music C having unclear origins. The Game Boy version has the 1860s Russian folk tune "Korobeiniki" for Music A, an original composition by Hirokazu Tanaka for Music B, and the Menuet of Johann Sebastian Bach's French Suite no. 3 for Music C. "Korobeiniki" has become primarily associated with Tetris as its main theme and would be used in most significant versions of the game, as mandated by the Tetris Company guidelines.

== Reception ==
=== Sales ===
Sales of selected versions of Tetris
Year	Game	Platform(s)	Sales
1988	Tetris (Spectrum HoloByte)	PC	1 million
1988	Tetris (Famicom)	Famicom	2 million
1989	Tetris (Game Boy)	Game Boy	35 million
1989	Tetris (NES)	NES	8 million
1996	Tetris Plus	PlayStation	1.53 million
1997	Tetrisphere	Nintendo 64	430,000
2001	Tetris Worlds	Multi-platform	1.81 million (Note: Tetris Worlds sold 960,000 copies for Game Boy Advance and 850,000 for PlayStation 2.)
2006	Tetris DS	Nintendo DS	2.05 million
2014	Puyo Puyo Tetris	Multi-platform	1.4 million
2020	Puyo Puyo Tetris 2	Multi-platform	293,000 (Note: Puyo Puyo Tetris 2 sold 93,000 copies. Puyo Puyo Tetris 2: Special Price sold 200,000 copies.)

According to multiple sources, Tetris is the best-selling video game of all time, with over 520 million copies per The Tetris Company. (Note: Attributed to multiple sources:) This sales figure is likely compiled from multiple versions of Tetris into one composite number. The majority of sales originate from paid mobile downloads; in April 2014, Rogers announced in an interview with VentureBeat that Tetris totaled 425 million paid mobile downloads and 70 million physical copies. The BBC disputes the claim of Tetris being the best-selling video game due to differences between the versions, including on mobile platforms, arguing that Minecraft (2011) is the true best-selling video game of all time. The most commercially successful version is the Game Boy version at 35 million copies sold.

=== Accolades ===
Tetris has garnered accolades and awards since its initial commercial release. The Spectrum HoloByte version won three Software Publishers Association Excellence in Software awards in 1989, including Best Entertainment Program and the Critic's Choice Award for consumers. Macworld inducted Tetris into the 1988 Macworld Game Hall of Fame in the Best Strategy Game category. Macworld praised "the addictive quality" and said its "simplicity is bewitching", and Compute! gave Tetris the 1989 Choice Award for Arcade Game, describing it as "by far, the most addictive game ever". Entertainment Weekly named the NES version the eighth-greatest game available for sale in 1991, saying: "Thanks to Nintendo's endless promotion, Tetris has become one of the most popular video games."

Tetris is considered among the greatest video games, being ranked as such by Flux (1995), Next Generation (1996 and 1999), Electronic Gaming Monthly (1997), GameSpot (2000), Game Informer (2001 and 2009), IGN (2007 and 2021), Time (2012 and 2016), GamesRadar+ (2015 and 2021), Polygon (2017), USA Today (2022 and 2024), The Times (2023), and GQ (2023). Tetris has also been ranked as among the best computer games by PC Format (1991) and Computer Gaming World (1996), among the best video game franchises by IGN (2006) and Den of Geek (2024), and among the most influential games by GamePro (2007), IGN (2007), 1Up.com (2010), GamesRadar+ (2013), and The Guardian (2017).

Tetris has been inducted into the "Hall of Fame" of the following publications: Computer Gaming World (1999), GameSpy (2000), GameSpot (2003), and IGN (2007). At the 2007 Game Developers Choice Awards, Pajitnov won the First Penguin Award, known afterward as the Pioneer Award, for pioneering casual gaming through Tetris. Tetris was listed as part of the game canon, announced at the 2007 Game Developers Conference by Henry Lowood of Stanford University as a list of ten games to be considered for preservation by the Library of Congress, modeled after the National Film Preservation Board. In November 2012, the Museum of Modern Art acquired Tetris, along with thirteen other video games, to display. As part of the 2015 inaugural class, The Strong National Museum of Play inducted Tetris into the World Video Game Hall of Fame for its iconic nature.

== Legacy ==
=== Industry impact ===
Due to Rogers and Nintendo's belief in its potential for mass appeal, Tetris was the pack-in game and the primary game promoted for the Game Boy in the United States. The resulting public anticipation led Tetris to become the Game Boy's main draw, with many, including non-gamers, buying the Game Boy specifically to play Tetris. It contributed to both the popularity of Tetris and the Game Boy, with the bundle selling out its initial run of a million copies shortly after release. This success established Nintendo's dominant position in the handheld gaming market, setting a standard that competitors struggled to match. Several writers credit Tetris and Pokémon Red and Blue (1996) for the Game Boy's longevity, as it would not be discontinued until 2003.

Tetris is influential in the genre of puzzle video games. Commentators have considered Tetris an early example of a casual game. (Note: Attributed to multiple sources:) Wired deemed Tetris unique for its time, given its appeal to players regardless of gender and age, and 1Up.com credits Tetris for establishing a market for puzzle video games with universal appeal. Tetris originated the puzzle game mechanic of managing an endless stream of shapes on a fixed screen. Several Tetris clones and derivative games have been created. Video games influenced by Tetris include Nintendo's Dr. Mario (1990), Sega's Columns (1990), Compile's Puyo Puyo (1991), Taito's Puzzle Bobble (1994), and Capcom's Super Puzzle Fighter II Turbo (1996). (Note: Attributed to multiple sources:)

=== Cultural impact ===
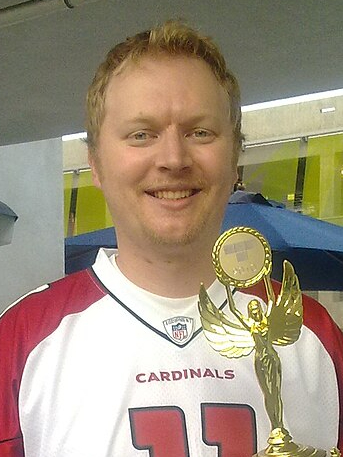
Jonas Neubauer (pictured in 2010) won the inaugural Classic Tetris World Championship.

Tetris's cultural impact and recognition is widespread, being represented in a vast array of video game platforms, among other media such as architecture, art, and merchandise. (Note: Attributed to multiple sources:) Tetris has been frequently referenced in pop culture, such as in The Simpsons, The Big Bang Theory, Family Guy, Futurama, Office Space, Muppet Babies, and Monty Python. "Korobeiniki", a Russian folk song, has become widely associated with Tetris following its inclusion in the Game Boy version. A 1992 Eurodance cover of "Korobeiniki" by Doctor Spin peaked at number six on the UK singles charts. The "Tetris effect" refers to the phenomenon of perceiving certain patterns in dreams and mental images following engagement in a repetitive activity such as playing Tetris. The term was coined by Jeffrey Goldsmith in a 1994 article for Wired, in which he compared Tetris to an "electronic drug".

External videos
- YouTube upload of Blue Scuti's live-streamed "beating" of NES Tetris.

Tetris is part of the competitive gaming scene, especially around the NES version. Competitor Jonas Neubauer and his victory in the inaugural Classic Tetris World Championship (CTWC) in 2010 were the subjects of the documentary Ecstasy of Order: The Tetris Masters (2010), which helped popularize competitive gameplay of Tetris. Competitors at the CTWC, typically adolescents, have used the CTWC to demonstrate advancements in the gameplay of the NES version. For example, gameplay techniques such as "hypertapping" and "rolling" have been used to help competitors to maximize their scores beyond level 29, which was previously deemed impossible to complete due to its speed. Willis Gibson "beat" Tetris by playing NES Tetris until it crashed in a 40-minute livestream in December 21, 2023, receiving significant media coverage for his achievement.

=== Scientific research ===
The Tetris game has frequently been featured in academic research, including in psychology, computer science, and game studies. By 2014, John K. Lindstedt and Wayne D. Gray, cognitive scientists of the Rensselaer Polytechnic Institute, had traced 133 scholarly papers across a variety of academic fields that used Tetris in their research. Soviet clinical psychologist Vladimir Pokhilko was the first to use Tetris in clinical experiments, conducting them around 1985 at the Moscow Medical Center. Prior to studying them, Pokhilko observed that distributed copies of Tetris to his colleagues impaired medical research due to their constant gameplay. Although he initially destroyed these copies, after new copies were reintroduced to his facility, Pokhilko used Tetris in psychological tests of his patients.

In psychology, starting with the research of American psychologist Richard J. Haier in 1992, Tetris has been frequently used in neuroimaging studies testing how gameplay affects the human brain. For example, the near-transfer effects of Tetris on mental rotation is frequently researched, though research methods have varied widely and results have been contradictory. Furthermore, Tetris has been studied as a potential form of psychological intervention, particularly regarding post-traumatic stress disorder (PTSD). To date, playing Tetris as imagery treatment for symptoms of PTSD is in need of further research. Nonetheless, several systematic reviews and meta-analyses have demonstrated some evidence supporting its effectiveness in reducing intrusive memories, especially when combined with other interventions.

In computer science, the Tetris game has been the subject of research papers analyzing how the tetrominoes affect gameplay. Most analyze a traditional game of Tetris and do not account for features such as queue. In 1992, John Brzustowski argued in his master's thesis for the University of Waterloo that it is impossible to play a traditional game of Tetris indefinitely, a conclusion affirmed by Heidi Burgiel of the University of Minnesota in 1997, who attributed the inevitable end to the game's Z-shaped tetrominoes and calculated a hard cap of seventy thousand tetrominoes. Partly accounting for the queue feature, in 2003 a trio of MIT students proved that the optimal strategy for playing a game of Tetris is NP-complete, meaning it is difficult to be solved by an algorithm within a reasonable time due to the game's complexity. This is true even if the player knew the complete sequence of incoming pieces.

=== Historical coverage ===
The background of Tetris, including its creation and legal battles in the late 1980s, has been documented multiple times. David Sheff provided a comprehensive overview in the Nintendo history book Game Over (1994). Subsequent books that covered this topic include the non-fiction books Steven L. Kent's The Ultimate History of Video Games (2001), Tristan Donovan's Replay: The History of Video Games (2010), Dan Ackerman's The Tetris Effect (2016), and the graphic novel Box Brown's Tetris: The Games People Play (2016). Most of these books present a descriptive history of Tetris that ends at 1991 and is favorable to Pajitnov, Rogers, and The Tetris Company. Mailland attributes this to Pajitnov, Rogers, and The Tetris Company presenting an incomplete and sanitized history of Tetris to claim sole credit for and ownership of the game, with certain facts such as Gerasimov's role in the game's development being neglected.

Tetris has also been the subject of documentaries including BBC's Tetris: From Russia with Love (2004) and the independent Ecstasy of Order: The Tetris Masters (2010). Tetris, a film dramatization of the legal battles starring Taron Egerton as Rogers, premiered on Apple TV+ on March 31, 2023, to positive reviews, according to Metacritic, and a viewership of 88,000 people, according to Samba TV. In August 2023, Ackerman sued Apple and The Tetris Company for copyright infringement, alleging that the Tetris film infringed upon The Tetris Effect. According to him, The Tetris Company had received a pre-print copy of the book and then prevented Ackerman from pursuing a film adaption of the book. Judge Katherine Failla of the US District Court for the Southern District of New York dismissed the lawsuit, finding that two creative works' expressions of non-copyrightable facts were different enough to not be infringement. Henk Rogers' memoir, The Perfect Game—Tetris: From Russia With Love, was published on April 1, 2025, to provide his perspective on Tetris's history following the film's release.

== See also ==
- Brain Wall and Blokken, game shows based on Tetris
- Tile-matching video game

== Bibliography ==
=== Books ===
External videos
- Presentation by Dan Ackerman on The Tetris Effect, September 12, 2016, C-SPAN

- Ackerman, Dan (2016). The Tetris Effect: The Game that Hypnotized the World. New York: PublicAffairs. ISBN 978-1-61039-611-0. OCLC 943694339 – via Internet Archive.
- Donovan, Tristan (2010). "A Plane to Moscow". Replay: The History of Video Games. East Sussex: Yellow Ant. pp. 199–211. ISBN 978-0-9565072-0-4 – via Internet Archive.
- Goldberg, Harold (2011). "Falling Blocks, Rising Fortunes". All Your Base are Belong to Us. New York: Three Rivers Press. pp. 74–89. ISBN 978-0-307-46355-5 – via Internet Archive.
- Kent, Steven L. (2001). "Tetris". The Ultimate History of Video Games: From Pong to Pokémon and Beyond—The Story Behind the Craze That Touched Our Lives and Changed the World. New York: Three Rivers Press. pp. 377–381. ISBN 978-0-7615-3643-7. OCLC 47254175 – via Internet Archive.
- Loguidice, Bill; Barton, Matt (2009). "Tetris (1985): Casual Gaming Falls Into Place". Vintage Games: An Insider Look at the History of Grand Theft Auto, Super Mario, and the Most Influential Games of All Time. Amsterdam: Focal Press. pp. 291–301. ISBN 978-0-240-81146-8 – via Internet Archive.
- Mailland, Julien (September 22, 2026). Soviet Blocks: The Bizarre Puzzle of How Tetris Embraced Western Values. Cambridge: MIT Press. ISBN 978-0-262-05458-4.
- Plank, Dana (July 25, 2022). "Tetris". In Perron, Bernard; Boudreau, Kelly; Wolf, Mark J.P.; Arsenault, Dominic (eds.). Fifty Key Video Games (First ed.). New York: Routledge. pp. 268–274. doi:10.4324/9781003199205. ISBN 978-1-003-19920-5.
- Sheff, David; Eddy, Andy (1999). "From Russia With Love". Game Over: Press Start to Continue. Wilton, CT: GamePress. pp. 295–348. ISBN 978-0-966-96170-6. OCLC 1190934258 – via Internet Archive.

=== Video documentaries ===
- Linneman, John (November 14, 2018). DF Retro: Tetris!. Digital Foundry – via YouTube.
- Pajitnov, Alexey; Rogers, Henk (April 26, 2023). Unsolved Tetris Mysteries With Creator Alexy Pajitnov & Designer Henk Rogers. Ars Technica – via YouTube.
- Temple, Magnus (2004). Tetris: From Russia with Love. BBC.
