= Maya Rogers =

American businesswoman and entrepreneur

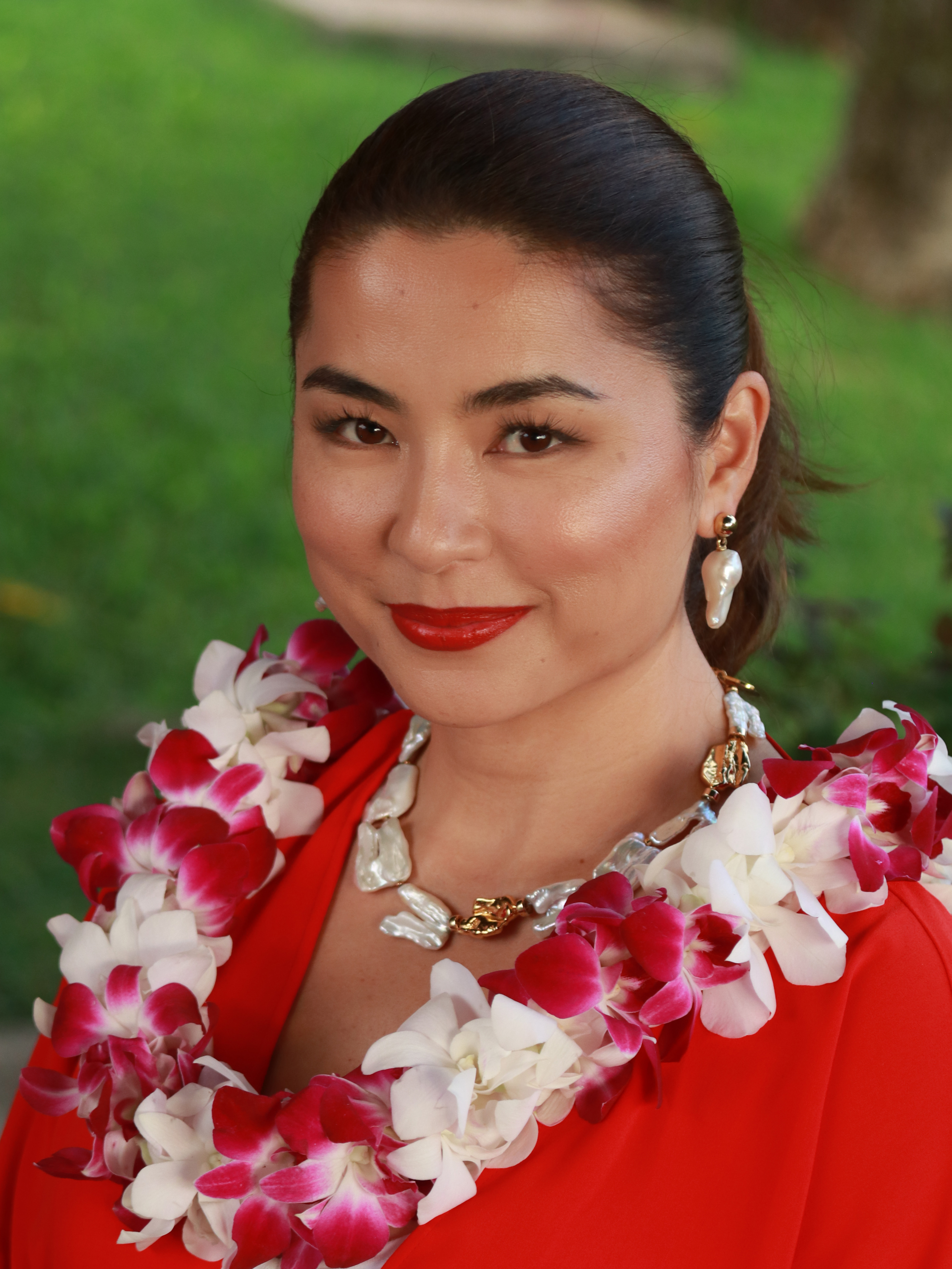
- Rogers in Honolulu, Hawaii, 2022
- Education: Pepperdine Graziadio Business School
- Employers: Blue Planet Software; Blue Startups (2012–); Sony Interactive Entertainment; The Tetris Company (2007–)
- Father: Henk Rogers

Maya Rogers (born May 1978) is a Japanese-American businesswoman and entrepreneur who works in the video game industry. She is the president and CEO of The Tetris Company, which manages the licensing and development of the Tetris brand.

== Early life and education ==
Rogers was born in May 1978 to parents Henk Rogers and Akemi in Japan and was educated there before moving to the United States with her family. Her father, Henk, was the video game developer who secured the rights to distribute Tetris on video game consoles and began to base his businesses in the U.S.

She attended Pepperdine University in Los Angeles County, California, where she earned a Bachelor of Science in business administration between 1996 and 2000. She also graduated with an Executive MBA from the Graziadio School of Business and Management at Pepperdine University between 2007 and 2009.

== Career ==
Prior to joining her family's Tetris business, Rogers worked as a logistics analyst at American Honda Motor Company, Inc., and as a localization producer at Sony Computer Entertainment America. She is also a founding partner of Blue Startups, a venture accelerator based in Hawaii.

Rogers developed and oversaw the creation of the 2023 film Tetris as an executive producer that debuted at SXSW and covered the life of her father and the company. Actress Kanon Narumi portrayed a young Rogers in the film.
