= Total Control (video game) =

1995 video game

Total Control is a real time strategy video game, developed and published by the Russian company DOCA in 1995.
