= Henk Rogers =

Dutch-born American computer programmer (born 1953)

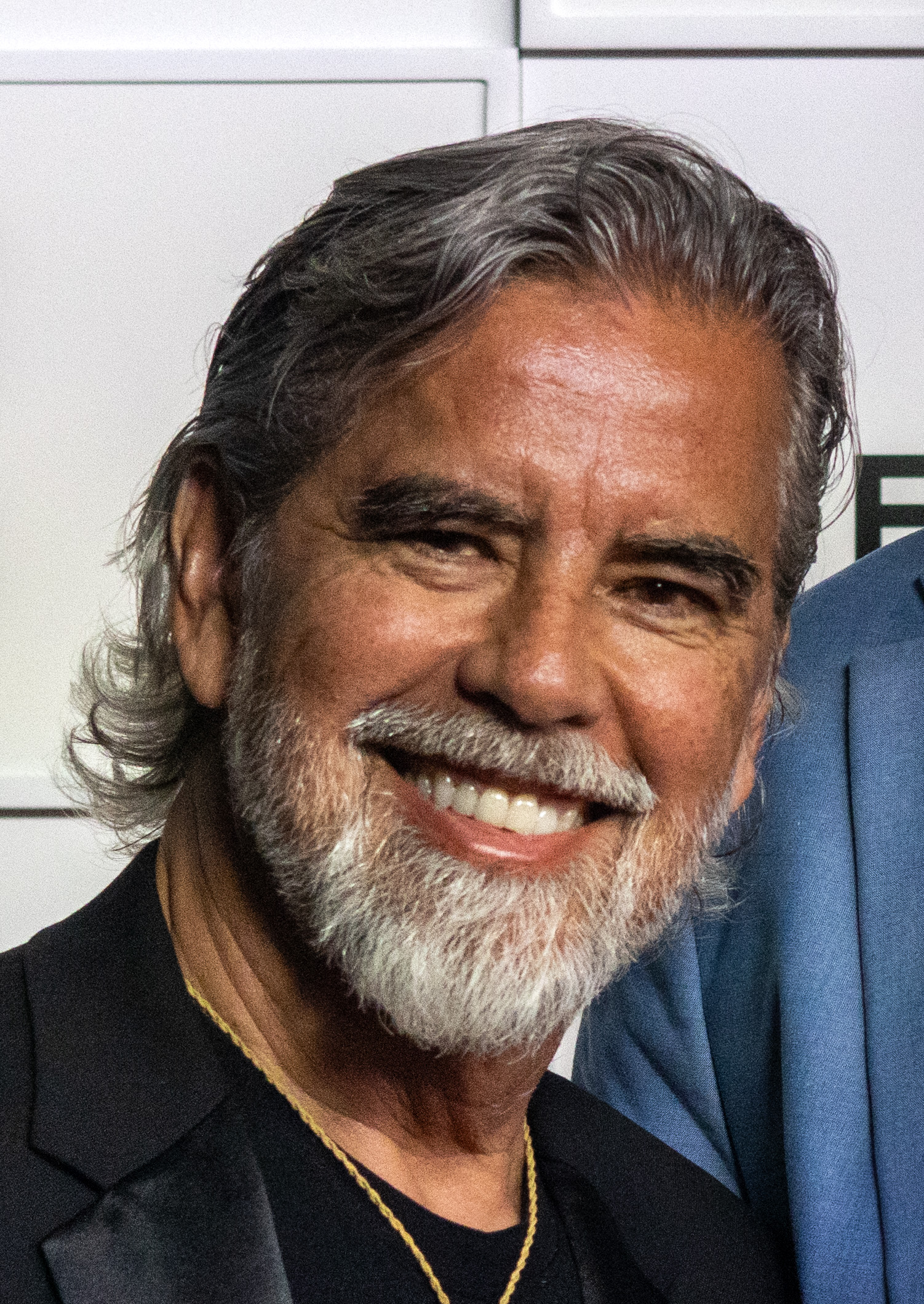
- Rogers in 2025
- Born: 24 December 1953 (age 72); Amsterdam, Netherlands
- Education: University of Hawaii
- Occupations: Video game designer, entrepreneur
- Spouse: Akemi Rogers (m. 1977)
- Children: 4, including Maya Rogers
- Website: henkrogers.com

Henk Rogers is a Dutch-born American video game designer and entrepreneur. He is known for producing Japan's first major turn-based role-playing video game The Black Onyx, securing the rights to distribute the Russian puzzle video game Tetris on video game consoles where the game found popularity, and as the founder of Bullet-Proof Software (and later Blue Planet Software) and The Tetris Company, which licenses the Tetris trademark. He was instrumental in resolving licensing disputes that brought Tetris to the Game Boy. Today, he is managing director of The Tetris Company.

== Early life ==
In 1972, Henk Rogers graduated from Stuyvesant High School in Manhattan. He later relocated to Hawaii, where he pursued studies in Computer Science at the University of Hawaii in Manoa.

While studying at the university, Henk met his future wife, Akemi. He followed her to Japan, her home country, and they married in 1977 after three extended visits. They lived in the family compound owned by Henk’s father-in-law and Henk was involved with his family business at the time. Henk and Akemi have four children together.

== Career ==
During the 1980s, as the founder and CEO of Bullet-Proof Software, Rogers developed an interest in Tetris, a game designed by Alexey Pajitnov that was gaining popularity in Europe. Rogers perceived the game as having enormous global market potential and decided to acquire its rights. To achieve this, he negotiated a deal with Nintendo to secure the rights for their upcoming Game Boy system, and then made a trip to the Soviet Union to deal with Elektronorgtechnica (ELORG), a software development company. During his meeting with ELORG's management, he managed to convince them about Tetris' prospects in the global market, resulting in a successful deal.

The deal with ELORG granted Rogers international rights to Tetris for home gaming systems. From there, he promoted the game, which ultimately became a global hit, primarily due to its release on Nintendo's handheld gaming system, the Game Boy. This success led to the establishment of The Tetris Company, co-founded by Rogers and Pajitnov.

Beyond Tetris and other video game endeavors, Rogers has founded or cofounded several community and sustainability-oriented organizations and companies.

The first of these was Blue Planet Foundation, a 501(c)(3) public charity focused on activities of advocacy, which Rogers founded in 2007 to build awareness and fostering action for clean energy in Hawaii. In 2015, the foundation led the campaign to make Hawaii the first state in the United States of America with a 100% renewable energy law.

Following this, Rogers joined his daughter Maya Rogers and local angel investor Chenoa Farnsworth to launch Blue Startups, a Honolulu-based startup accelerator to mentor, invest in, and encourage the founding of technology startups, particularly ones servicing the cross-Pacific region and/or several targeted interest areas.

In 2015, Rogers then founded Blue Planet Energy, an energy storage systems (i.e., batteries) provider. Blue Planet Energy's lithium-ion batteries use a lithium ferrous phosphate (LFP) chemistry instead of nickel manganese cobalt (NMC) chemistry. Rogers believes LFP to be more environmentally friendly because the batteries are noncombustible and do not require rare earth elements.

Rogers is also chairman of the Pacific International Space Center for Exploration Systems (PISCES) and founder of the International MoonBase Alliance, which developed the Hawaii Space Exploration Analog and Simulation (HI-SEAS), a 1,200 square-foot Mars and moon analog habitat on Mauna Loa. PISCES' core mission is to develop and grow an aerospace industry in Hawaii through applied research, workforce development and economic development initiatives.

== In media ==
Rogers is portrayed by Welsh actor Taron Egerton in the 2023 film Tetris.
