= Box Brown =

American cartoonist

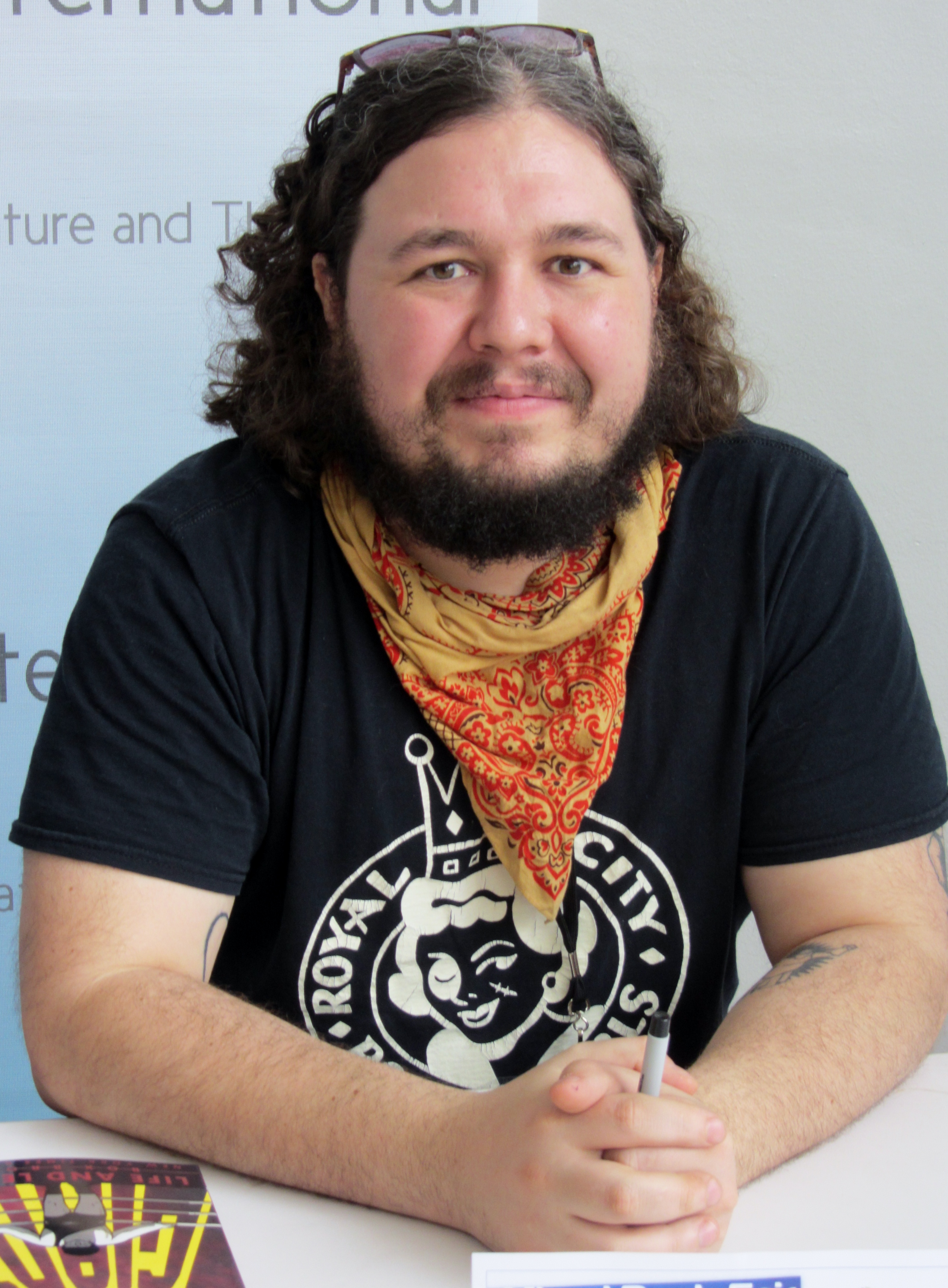
- Brown at the Miami Book Fair International, 2014
- Born: Brian Brown; 1980 (age 45–46)
- Areas: Cartoonist, Publisher
- Notable works: André the Giant: Life and Legend; Retrofit Comics
- Awards: Two Ignatz Awards, 2011 Eisner Award, 2019

Brian "Box" Brown (born 1980) is an American cartoonist whose first work was the online comic Bellen! He was awarded in 2011 a Xeric Grant for the comic Love is a Peculiar Type of Thing.

In 2011, Brown started a Kickstarter fundraiser to create a new publisher called Retrofit Comics, with the goal of publishing 16 alternative comic books over 16 months. Since completing this goal, Retrofit Comics has continued to publish new comic books every month or two.

Brown created a full-length graphic novel about the professional wrestler André the Giant called André the Giant: Life and Legend. It debuted as ninth bestseller on the New York Times Bestseller List for Paperback Graphic Books and remained on the list for three weeks.

In 2019, his book Is This Guy For Real? The Unbelievable Andy Kaufman won the Eisner Award for Best Reality Based Work.

He has a syndicated non-fiction comic strip, Legalization Nation.

== Graphic novels ==
- Love is a Peculiar Type of Thing (Top Shelf, 2009)
- The Survivalist (Blank Slate, 2011)
- Number, Issues 1 & 2 (Retrofit / Big Planet Comics, 2014)
- André the Giant: Life and Legend (First Second, 2014)
- An Entity Observes All Things (Retrofit Comics, 2015)
- Tetris: The Games People Play (First Second, 2016)
- Powerman (Kilgore Books, 2016)
- Is This Guy for Real? The Unbelievable Andy Kaufman (First Second, 2016).
- Cannabis: The Illegalization of Weed in America (First Second, 2019)
- Child Star (First Second, 2020)
- Accidental Czar: The Life and Lies of Vladimir Putin (with Andrew S. Weiss, First Second, 2022)
- The He-Man Effect: How American Toymakers Sold You Your Childhood (First Second, 2023)
