= The Tetris Company =

American video game company

The Tetris Company, Inc.
- Type: Private
- Industry: Video games
- Founded: 1996; 30 years ago
- Founder: Alexey Pajitnov; Henk Rogers
- Headquarters: Las Vegas, Nevada, United States
- Area served: Worldwide
- Key people: Maya Rogers (president & CEO)
- Services: Licensor of the Tetris brand
- Website: tetris.com

The Tetris Company, Inc. (TTC) is the manager and licensor for the Tetris brand to third parties. It is an American company based in Nevada and owned by the Tetris creator Alexey Pajitnov and Henk Rogers. The company is the exclusive licensee of Tetris Holding LLC, the company that owns Tetris rights worldwide.

== History ==
Tetris was created in 1985 by Pajitnov. As the initial versions of the game spread through the Eastern Bloc, interest in licensing it for western commercial release drew much attention. Elektronorgtechnica (Elorg) was the Soviet agency created to control the import and export of hardware and software outside the Soviet Union. As part of the licensing of the game, Pajitnov agreed to let Elorg handle all licensing for a 10-year period. One of the main licensees of the game was Bullet-Proof Software, owned by Henk Rogers, with whom Pajitnov struck up a friendship. Following the fall of the Soviet Union, Elorg was privatized.

The Tetris Company was established in 1996 by Pajitnov and Rogers to manage the worldwide licensing of the property. The visual expression in official Tetris games is covered by copyrights that are owned by Tetris Holding, LLC, the company into which Pajitnov placed his Tetris rights. The Tetris Company licenses the Tetris trademark (which includes Tetris trade dress elements, such as the distinct brightly colored blocks and the vertically rectangular play field) to video game development companies and maintains a set of guidelines that each licensed game must meet. Initially, Elorg was a partner in the Tetris Company until Rogers and Pajitnov bought Elorg's remaining rights around 2005.

In October 2020, the previous licensing company for the Tetris brand, Blue Planet Software Inc. (BPS), founded by Henk Rogers in 1996, merged with the Tetris Company, effectively rendering BPS defunct. The Tetris Company has also issued licenses to third parties for other products, such as greeting cards and lottery tickets.

== Legal enforcement ==
TTC drew attention in the late 1990s when it attempted to remove freeware and shareware clones of Tetris from the market by sending out cease-and-desist letters claiming both trademark and copyright infringement. Creators of Tetris clones claimed that the company had no valid legal basis to restrict tetromino games that did not infringe on the Tetris name trademark, since copyright "look-and-feel" suits have not stood up in court in the past (Lotus v. Borland), and because the letters made no patent claims.

In August 2008, Apple Inc. removed Tris, a clone of Tetris, from its online App Store. In March 2009, the Tetris Company sued BioSocia, operator of the Omgpop gaming portal because one of its multiplayer games, Blockles, was too similar to Tetris. By September 2009, Omgpop removed the game from the website and replaced it with an alternate that the developers created, based on Puyo Puyo.

In May 2010, lawyers representing The Tetris Company sent Google a Digital Millennium Copyright Act Violation Notice regarding Tetris clones available on the Android Market. Google responded by removing the 35 games listed in the notice even though, according to one developer, the games contained no references to Tetris.

In February 2011, the Tetris Company continued to make copyright claims against independently developed Tetris clones, most notably against Tetrada on the Windows Phone 7 marketplace. The developer, Mario Karagiannis, rejected the claims of copyright infringement on the grounds that copyright does not cover gameplay design, but still removed the game, citing lack of resources to fight what he called "bullying".

In the case Tetris Holding, LLC v. Xio Interactive, Inc., a US District Court judge ruled in June 2012 that the Tetris clone Mino from Xio Interactive infringed on the Tetris Company's copyrights by replicating elements such as the playfield dimensions and the shapes of the blocks.

In April 2021, a YouTuber called JDH made an operating system that only runs Tetris. Two months later, his GitHub repository was taken offline by The Tetris Company because of copyright infringement.

On September 3, 2026, the Trump Administration released the website Arcade.gov which featured five retro-styled games based on policies of the administration. Among these was a Tetris clone called Build the Wall, based on the administration's efforts to complete the Mexico–United States border wall. The Tetris Company issued a public response to disassociate itself from the creation of Build the Wall and also stated that it was reviewing the matter for potential violation of copyright. By September 8, 2026, the Build the Wall game was removed from the government site.
