= Gilman Louie =

American video game designer and venture capitalist (born 1960)

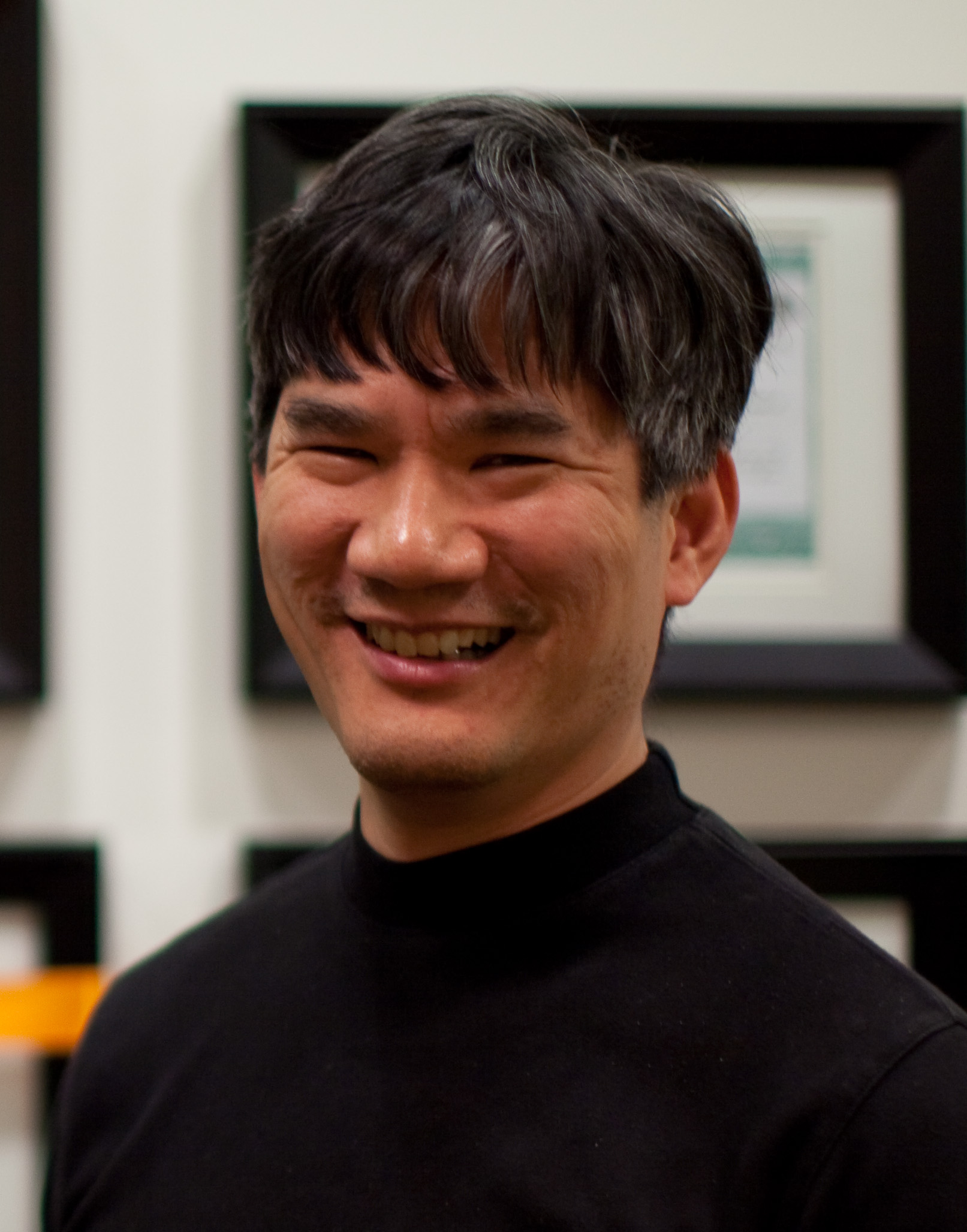
- Louie in 2008
- Born: 1960 (age 65–66); San Francisco, California, U.S.
- Education: San Francisco State University (BSBA)
- Occupations: Venture capitalist, former video game designer
- Known for: CEO of Spectrum Holobyte, co-founder and CEO of In-Q-Tel

Gilman Louie (born 1960) is an American technology venture capitalist and former video game designer. He is co-founder and chief executive (CEO) of America's Frontier Fund, a non profit investment fund focused on emerging technologies. Louie served as the first chief executive of In-Q-Tel, the venture capital firm created to invest in technologies of interest to the United States intelligence community.

Through his company Nexa Corporation, Louie designed and developed multiple computer games such as the F-16 Fighting Falcon flight simulator series. His company later merged with Spectrum Holobyte where he was CEO until its acquisition by Hasbro, after which he became Chief Creative Officer and General Manager of its Games.com group. He has been on a number of boards of directors, including Wizards of the Coast, Niantic, Total Entertainment Network, FASA Interactive, Wickr, Aerospike, the Chinese American International School, Markle Foundation, Digital Promise, and Maxar Technologies. He is chairman of the Federation of American Scientists and Vricon. He is a member of the President’s Intelligence Advisory Board and the U.S. Department of State’s Foreign Affairs Policy Board.

== Early life and education ==
Louie was born in San Francisco. He is a fourth-generation Chinese-American. He graduated in 1983 from San Francisco State University with a Bachelor of Science degree in business administration. In 1997, he attended the then thirteen-week Advanced Management Program (AMP) and International Senior Management Program (ISMP) at Harvard Business School.

== Career ==
=== Video games ===
Louie built a career in the video game industry, founding a company in 1981 while still in college. He called it NEXA Corporation, based on a department at SFSU that was a combination of the humanities and the sciences. In 1986 his company merged with Spectrum Holobyte via a shell company called Sphere, Inc., with Louie as CEO, and then he became CEO of Spectrum Holobyte in 1992. In 1992 he acquired MicroProse. He designed and developed the F-16 Fighting Falcon flight simulator series (1984–1998). He was also chairman of Spectrum HoloByte when it published Tetris (1987), based on a disputed license. His company was acquired by Hasbro Interactive in 1998, where Louie served as Chief Creative Officer and general manager of the Games.com group.

=== Venture capital ===
In 1999 Louie co-founded and became the CEO of the non-profit Peleus (later In-Q-It and then In-Q-Tel). The company was created with $30 million in seed money from the US federal government, and was intended to help enhance national security by connecting the United States Intelligence Community with venture-backed entrepreneurial companies and by making venture capital style investments in new technologies.

As of 2021, Louie is a partner of Alsop Louie Partners, a venture capital fund focused on helping entrepreneurs start companies. Known investments of Alsop Louie Partners include Niantic, Inc., Wickr, Cleversafe, Ribbit, Zephyr Technologies, Gridspeak, Netwitness, and LookingGlass Cyber Solutions.

=== Board activities ===
Louie has been on a number of boards of directors, including Wizards of the Coast, Total Entertainment Network, Direct Language, FASA Interactive, Netwitness, Motive Medical, Wickr, Gridspeak, the National Venture Capital Association (NVCA), Zephyr Technologies, the CIA Officers Memorial Foundation, Aerospike, GreatSchools and the Chinese American International School in San Francisco. He is on the board of the Markle Foundation, Greatschools.org and Digital Promise. Louie is chairman of the Federation of American Scientists and the Mandarin Institute. In September 2015, he was elected chairman of a US-based 3D Geospatial Mapping company, Vricon.

== Other activities ==
Louie was appointed to the United States National Security Commission on Artificial Intelligence (NSCAI) that was established in 2018 and issued its final report in March 2021. He was vice chairman of the standing committee on Technology, Insight-Gauge, Evaluate and Review for the United States National Academies. He also chaired the committee on Forecasting Future Disruptive Technologies for the United States National Academies that produced two reports.

In 2009, representing his company Alsop Louie Partners, he sat as a member of the committee for The Symposium on Avoiding Technology Surprise for Tomorrow's Warfighter working alongside Raytheon.

In May 2022, Louie was appointed as a member of the President's Intelligence Advisory Board. In June 2022, he was appointed as a member of the U.S. Department of State’s Foreign Affairs Policy Board.

== Credits ==
Video games designed, programmed and/or produced:

- Falcon 4.0 (1998), MicroProse
- Falcon Gold (1994), Spectrum HoloByte
- Falcon 3.0: MiG-29 (1993), Spectrum HoloByte
- Falcon 3.0: Hornet (1993), Spectrum HoloByte
- Falcon 3.0: Operation Fighting Tiger (1992), Spectrum HoloByte
- Falcon 3.0 (1991), Spectrum HoloByte
- Crisis in the Kremlin (1991), Spectrum HoloByte
- Super Tetris (1991), Spectrum HoloByte
- Stunt Driver (1990), Spectrum HoloByte
- Tank: The M1A1 Abrams Battle Tank Simulation (1989), Spectrum HoloByte
- Falcon A.T. (1989), Spectrum HoloByte
- Vette! (1989), Spectrum HoloByte
- L.A. Crackdown (1988), Epyx
- Falcon (1987), Spectrum HoloByte
- The World's Greatest Football Game (1985) Epyx
- Captain Cosmo (1984), ASCII Corporation
- F-16 Fighting Falcon (1984), ASCII Corporation, Sega
- Starship Simulator (1984), ASCII Corporation
- Delta Squadron (1983), Nexa Corporation
- Starship Commander (1981), Voyager Software
- Battle Trek (1981), Voyager Software

== Awards ==
- 1988 George Washington High School (San Francisco) Hall of Merit
- 1988 Excellence in Software Awards (Codie awards), Software and Information Industry Association (formerly the Software Publishers Association): Best Technical Achievement, Best Simulation, Best Action/Strategy Game for Falcon
- 1993 Asian Business League's Distinguished Entrepreneur of the Year
- 1995 San Francisco State University Hall of Fame
- 2002 Scientific American Fifty
- 2004 Potomac Institute for Policy Studies Navigator Award
- 2005 Federal 100 Award, Federal Computer Week
- 2006 National Geospatial-Intelligence Agency medallion for outstanding service and support to the National Geospatial-Intelligence Agency while CEO and President of In-Q-Tel
- 2006 CIA Agency Seal Medallions (2) for his service to the intelligence community
- 2006 Director's Award by the Director of the Central Intelligence Agency, Porter Goss, for his service in creating In-Q-Tel and providing service to the intelligence community
- 2007 Order of the Silver Helmet, Delta Sigma Pi
- 2008 Director of National Intelligence Medallion for service within the Intelligence Community
- 2021 Tech Titans, by the Washingtonian (magazine) for Cybersecurity
- 2021 Theodore Roosevelt Government Leadership Award by Government Executive for significant, lasting achievements around emerging technologies and cybersecurity
- 2023 Arthur C. Lundahl—Thomas C. Finnie Lifetime Achievement Award by United States Geospatial Intelligence Foundation
- 2025 Charlie Allen Award for Distinguished Intelligence Service Award by AFCEA International
