= Tetris Classic =

1992 video game

- Developer: Spectrum HoloByte
- Publisher: Spectrum HoloByte
- Designers: Rebecca Ang; Heather Mace
- Programmer: Rebecca Ang
- Artists: Charlie Aquilina; Chuck Butler; Kathleen Thornton
- Composer: Paul Mogg
- Series: Tetris
- Platform: DOS
- Release: July 1992
- Genre: Puzzle
- Modes: Single-player, multiplayer

Tetris Classic is a 1992 puzzle video game developed and published by Spectrum HoloByte for DOS systems. It is an adaptation of the 1985 Soviet video game Tetris. Spectrum HoloByte released their first commercial version of Tetris in North America in 1988. Spectrum HoloByte subsequently developed a series of annual spin-off titles for Tetris, and intended to take advantage of improvements in computer technology since the original game's release; for Tetris Classic, they showcased the Video Graphics Array (VGA) standard via illustrations depicting scenes from Alexander Pushkin's poem Ruslan and Ludmila, as well as a soundtrack consisting of selections from Mikhail Glinka's opera adaptation of the poem. The game additionally includes competitive and cooperative two-player modes and an option to set a time limit on games. The game received mixed critical commentary; while reviewers appreciated the enhanced presentation and new multiplayer modes, they noted that the gameplay was unchanged from the original version.

== Gameplay ==
An example of gameplay from Tetris Classic; the game's illustrations depict scenes from the Russian poem Ruslan and Ludmila

Tetris Classic is a puzzle video game in which pieces consisting of four squares in seven shapes descend into an empty pit. As the pieces fall, the player can move the pieces laterally and rotate them until they land either on the bottom of the pit or on another piece. The player can hasten a piece's descent with a particular input, and if the "Soft Drop" option is toggled off, the piece will be immediately dropped to its lowest possible position. The player must fit the falling pieces into a position that forms a horizontal line of boxes across the pit. When a line is completed, it disappears and all squares above it drop one row. In the game's single-player campaign, completing ten lines on a given level advances the player to the next level, and the rate of the pieces' descent increases. The single-player campaign consists of a total of ten levels. A non-timed game ends prematurely if the pieces reach the top of the pit.

The player can select between two scoring methods. In the original method, the number of points awarded for each piece increases with each subsequent level, and more points can be awarded if a piece is dropped faster than its default speed. The player can receive extra points by toggling off the "Next Piece" option, which displays an advance notice of what piece will fall after the current one. In the Tetris Classic method, bonus points are awarded if a piece completes two or more lines at once. Within any given mode, the top ten high scores will be displayed at the end of a game.

=== Game modes ===
Tetris Classic includes five basic modes of play: single-player, cooperative, competitive, dual pit, and head-to-head. The single-player campaign is further divided into five subsequent modes determined by a time limit, ranging from unlimited to 15 minutes. In the cooperative and competitive modes, two players work within a wider pit, respectively to help each other complete rows or to compete in completing rows faster than the other. In both modes, the players' pieces fall at the same time. In the cooperative mode, the players share a common score, while in the competitive mode, each player has their own score, with points being awarded to the player who completes a line. In both modes, the game ends when one player allows the pieces to reach the top; in competitive mode, the player with the higher score wins. In the dual pit mode, two players compete against each other side-by-side in their own pits. The head-to-head mode is similar to the dual pit mode, but is played between two separate computers connected by a null modem serial cable or a NetWare local area network. The dual pit and head-to-head modes feature the option for players to send one or more incomplete rows to their opponent by completing multiple lines in their own pit. In all competitive two-player modes, players have the option to receive the same pieces in the same order to even the gameplay.

== Development and release ==
Tetris was created in 1985 by Alexey Pajitnov, a researcher for the computing center of the Soviet Academy of Sciences, and originally programmed by Moscow State University student Vadim Gerasimov. The Soviet Academy of Sciences licensed the game's commercial rights to Elektronorgtechnica (Elorg), and through the combined efforts of Pajitnov, Elorg, and American publisher Spectrum HoloByte, Tetris gained rapid popularity in the United States upon its release there in 1988. This success encouraged Spectrum HoloByte to release annual spin-offs, including Welltris (1989), Faces...tris III (1990), Wordtris (1991), and Super Tetris (1991). From the time of Tetris's creation onward, computer technology advanced, granting improved graphics, audio systems, pointing devices, networks, and processing speeds. Spectrum HoloByte sought to take advantage of these improvements by creating an upgraded version of Tetris. They were also motivated by customer feedback, having received several suggestions via their customer support staff.

Tetris Classic was designed by Rebecca Ang and Heather Mace, the former also being the lead programmer. The game showcases 256-color VGA graphics, and also supports 16-color EGA and Tandy 1000 displays. The artwork – created by Charlie Aquilina, Chuck Butler, and Kathleen Thornton – was illustrated in the style of lacquer painting, and depicts scenes from Alexander Pushkin's poem Ruslan and Ludmila. The audio, created by Paul Mogg, features arrangements of selections from Mikhail Glinka's opera Ruslan and Lyudmila; the title screen is accompanied by the opera's overture. The game's copy protection consists of a randomly-selected trivia question about Ruslan and Ludmila, Pushkin, or Glinka, the answer to which is located in the game's manual. The game was released in July 1992 for IBM PC DOS and MS-DOS systems. It was later released as a part of Spectrum HoloByte's 1994 compilation title Tetris Gold.

== Reception ==
Reception

Review scores
Publication	Score
Aktueller Software Markt	5/12
Los Angeles Times	3/5

Tetris Classic received mixed critical commentary upon release. Lance Elko of Game Players PC Entertainment complimented the play variations and improved look and sound, considering it to be a richer experience than the original version. Michael S. Lasky of Computer Gaming World was delighted by the background graphics and stated that though the title's enhancements were "basically cosmetic", its addictive nature was preserved by the gameplay's intuitive and deceptive simplicity. Jeane DeCoster and David Crook of the Los Angeles Times, in a joint review with Super Tetris, found the game to be unchanged from the original version despite the enhanced presentation and added competitive mode. Nevertheless, they acknowledged that the two games used new technology well, and concluded that they could "turn even the most casual players into hard-core gamers". Marcus Höfer of Aktueller Software Markt, in a negative review, felt that the game's price was unjustified for its minimal new features, especially given the original game's shareware status. He suggested that the title be ignored by those who already own Super Tetris as well as Tetris players satisfied with single-player gameplay and who do not value attractive background graphics.
