= Falcon 3.0 =

1991 video game

- Developer: Sphere Inc.
- Publishers: NA: Spectrum HoloByte; EU: MicroProse
- Director: Scot Bayless
- Designers: Gilman Louie; Les Watts
- Programmers: Erick Jap; Kuswara Pranawahadi; Gary Stottlemyer
- Composer: Paul Mogg
- Series: Falcon
- Platform: MS-DOS
- Release: 1991
- Genre: Combat flight simulator
- Modes: Single player, multiplayer

Falcon 3.0 is a combat flight simulator video game developed by Sphere Inc. and published by Spectrum HoloByte in 1991 as the third official main entry in the Falcon series of the F-16 Fighting Falcon simulators.

== Gameplay ==
A Screenshot showing the player engaging an enemy via an AIM9M. The game uses a slightly fictionalized variant of an F-16A cockpit, with the radar screen (bottom center) pictured next to the SCP (left).

Falcon 3.0 was claimed to have used flight dynamics from a real military simulator, and required a math coprocessor to enable the high fidelity flight mode. Even in less demanding modes, it was still virtually unplayable on computers slower than a 386. The recommended configuration was a 33 MHz 486, a top end machine at this time.

Falcon 3.0 offered "padlock" view, in which the player's POV is slewed in the direction of a selected target, scanning around the cockpit if necessary. It also offered players more natural looking topography than other commercial PC flight simulations at the time—with mountains, hills, valleys and other features having their own unique shapes.

The game includes a campaign engine that simulates fictional wars in Iraq, Israel, and Panama, with limited supplies of pilots, aircraft, and weapons that are periodically replenished. The game also includes a simulation of the Red Flag training exercise in Nevada which functions as a tutorial mode.

== Expansions ==
An expansion pack Operation Fighting Tiger was released in 1992. It contains several additional scenarios, including a future skirmish between Japan and Russia, which gave the player the Japanese F-16 variant, the "FSX".

Two more expansions were released in 1993: MiG-29: Deadly Adversary of Falcon 3.0 and Hornet: Naval Strike Fighter.

Art of the Kill, a video tutorial that teaches aerial dogfighting basics used Falcon 3.0's built-in ACMI recorder to reconstruct engagements, explains tactics and counter-tactics. Falcon 3.0 was also the subject of dozens of aftermarket books, some written by actual F-16 pilots. Only the Microsoft Flight Simulator series spawned more books.

The game was re-released in 1994 as Falcon Gold a compilation which included Art of the Kill video digitized on the CD collection, along with Operation Fighting Tiger and the announcement for Falcon 4.0. It noted for their early multiplayer support, as even the first version supported two players via a null modem serial port connection.

== Reception ==
Falcon 3.0 sold 400,000 copies by March 1995. Including its expansions, the full "Falcon 3.0 line" surpassed 700,000 copies in sales by December 1998. According to GameSpot, Falcon 3.0 sold well for years after its initial release, and add-on products extended its longevity.

Falcon 3.0 received 5 out of 5 stars in Dragon. In 1992 Vermont Air National Guard F-16 pilot Doug Fick stated in Computer Gaming World that the game's flight model and avionics were very accurate, and praised the game's VGA graphics. He was more critical in 1993, stating that "Spectrum Holobyte and the Falcon 3.0 team could learn something about realistic flight characteristics from" F-15 Strike Eagle III. A 1992 survey in Computer Gaming World of wargames with modern settings gave the game four and a half stars out of five, describing Falcon 3.0 as not as a game system as it is a way of life, but as the most complex air simulator ever released for the commercial sector, and the magazine named it the year's best simulation game. In 1996, the magazine ranked Falcon 3.0 as the tenth best computer game of all time for its introduction of "the first truly realistic flight model" for a jet aircraft, useful wingman and dynamic flight sim campaign, as well as the seventh most innovative computer game for setting a standard for realism and connectivity. That year, Falcon Gold was also ranked as the 80th top game of all time by Next Generation.

In 1994, PC Gamer US named Falcon 3.0 the 15th best computer game ever. The editors wrote at the time that no other jet simulation could surpass Spectrum Holobyte's Falcon 3.0 for its realism and detailed flight models. In 1996, Next Generation listed Falcon 3.0 Gold as number 80 on their "Top 100 Games of All Time". CNET Gamecenter named Falcon 3.0 one of the 10 most innovative computer games ever.

Despite many bugs (Computer Gaming World reported that "some readers have suggested that we give Falcon 3.0 the award for 'The Buggiest Game Ever'"), Falcon 3.0 retained its reputation as the most realistic flight simulation for years.

The editors of PCGames named Falcon 3.0 the best flight simulator of 1992, calling it the most detailed and most realistic simulator.
