= Falcon 4.0 =

1998 video game

- European box art
- Developer: MicroProse Alameda (Note: Mac OS version developed by Westlake Interactive.)
- Publisher: Hasbro Interactive (Note: Released under the MicroProse label) (Note: Mac OS version published by MacSoft.)
- Designers: Steve Blankenship; Gilman Louie
- Series: Falcon
- Platforms: Windows, Mac OS
- Release: Windows: NA: 11 December 1998; UK: 18 December 1998; Mac OS; May 1999
- Genre: Air combat simulation
- Modes: Single player, multiplayer

Falcon 4.0 is a combat flight simulation video game developed by MicroProse's Alameda development studio and published by Hasbro Interactive under the MicroProse label in 1998. The game is based around a realistic simulation of the Block 50/52 F-16 Fighting Falcon jet fighter in a full-scale modern war set in the Korean Peninsula.

The game is the ultimate development in the Falcon series from Spectrum HoloByte that began in 1984. HoloByte had acquired MicroProse in 1993, and started using that name for all of its titles in 1996. After MicroProse was purchased by Hasbro, official development ended. In 2000, a source code leak allowed continued development of the game by members of the gaming community, including bug fixes and new campaigns. Many of these additions were collected by Lead Pursuit, which arranged an official license of the original code base from the owner Atari; these were published as Falcon 4.0: Allied Force in 2005. Spanning well over a decade, the Falcon 4.0 series is one of the longest running game series using the same code base in PC history.

In the present day, the game is still supported by a community of players with the most supported branch of the game being the one by Benchmark Sims Community, called Falcon BMS.

On May 4, 2023, the current incarnation of MicroProse announced the reacquisition of the copyright to the Falcon series, including Falcon 4.0.

== Gameplay ==
The game's story begins in the early 1990s with North Korean forces invading South Korea. The United States deploys extensive support to the South, including military aircraft, armored forces, and naval vessels. The rest of the game plays out in response to the player's actions, potentially involving China and Russia. Japan has an airbase, but plays no role in the conflict itself. Because of the game's story content, which involves war in the Korean Peninsula, it was banned in South Korea until 2003.

Cockpit view

Falcon 4.0's gameplay parallels actual fighter pilot combat operations. First, over 30 training scenarios acquaint the player with F-16 maneuvering, avionics operation, and various USAF protocols. After training, the player may start the primary gameplay mode in the campaign, which simulates participation in a modern war. Alternatively, the player may engage in dogfight mode, which provides an individual air engagement without any continuous context, or create what are effectively miniature campaigns, known as "Tactical Engagements".

The results of the player's performance are used to generate a 'logbook'. This contains details such as flight hours, air-to-air and air-to-ground kills, decorations, a name and photo, and the current rank of the player. Good performance (such as eliminating large numbers of enemy ground units, or surviving a difficult engagement) during a mission may lead to the award of a decoration or promotion; conversely, poor performance (destroying friendly targets or ejecting from the aircraft for no good reason) can lead to demotion or court-martial.

Campaign gameplay has two primary stages, briefings and missions. The briefing section is used to handle the planning of flights and packages (a number of flights grouped together for mutual support in obtaining a military objective), assignment of steerpoints for determining the route of a given flight, and the weapons loadout used by the aircraft. It is also possible to issue instructions to each ground unit manually, overriding the AI's handling of the war. As is the situation for real life pilots, it is of the utmost importance that the player examines closely all of the data presented here to perform well during the mission, in order to best formulate a plan of action when actually flying the jet. Failing to note the location and abilities of enemy SAM sites or CAP aircraft and account for methods of defeating these will almost certainly result in a short flight.

The mission section of the simulator encompasses the actual mechanics of flying the aircraft, radar and weapons operation, threat evaluation, radio communications and navigation. Everything is done in such a manner as to model the aircraft in use as closely as possible, while on the highest realism settings.

The initial release of the software came with three pre-set scenarios for the player to use in campaign mode. 'Tiger Spirit' depicted a war where ROK and Allied forces had repelled the initial DPRK assault and moved onto the offensive. 'Rolling Fire' depicted a closely matched situation where DPRK forces had overrun the DMZ and made small gains, while 'Iron Fortress' simulated a scenario where the North had overwhelmed the South and pushed it back to its last line of defense.

Unlike its static counterpart, a dynamic campaign has no set game path. Missions and the rest of the game world develop as the game progresses, affected in part by the player's behavior. Dynamic campaigns can present a more random and diverse game experience, but are more difficult for programmers to implement. The AI controlling the activity of the Falcon 4.0 campaign engine can be influenced by a wide range of configurable settings, all of which can be adjusted to meet changing objectives as the scenario progresses.

A Tactical Engagement (or TE) is a small scale, hand-built, 'one-shot' mission with a pre-defined objective. The same engine handles the activities of AI controlled units. One of the advantages of building this style of mission is that it allows experienced pilots to practice attacks on high value, well defended targets, which are often eliminated from campaigns early on as the planning AI assigns packages to eliminate them in order to maximise the effect on enemy combat readiness.

The Instant Action mode of operation places the user in an F-16 currently in flight, armed with an infinite number of missiles. Progressively more capable waves of enemy aircraft then move in and engage the player's aircraft. Many different options are available to customise this mode, including disabling SAM and AAA defenses, setting unlimited fuel, and the difficulty of the first wave of inbound hostiles.

Falcon 4.0 originally featured 3D graphics with multitexturing support. It was one of the first programs on the market which was designed multi-threaded to take advantage of dual-core x86 processors. The game used one thread for graphics and primary simulation and the other for the campaign engine.

== Development ==
The game was in development since 1994. The game was originally designed and produced by Steve Blankenship and Gilman Louie and published under the MicroProse label. Though originally slated for a late 1996 release, the game ended up being rushed to market in order to make the 1998 Christmas selling season.

=== Source code leak ===
On 9 April 2000 a developer of the game leaked the source code of a Falcon 4.0 version between 1.07 and 1.08 on an FTP site. Kevin Klemmick later claimed responsibility for the leak.

=== Digital distribution re-releases ===
In October 2015, Tommo's Retroism publishing label re-released the Falcon series (including Falcon 4.0 as a bonus) via digital distribution at GOG.com, titled as the Falcon Collection, after being commercially unavailable for some years. In January 2016, Retroism released the Falcon Collection on Steam, with all four titles also available for purchase separately.

=== Modern community development ===
Falcon BMS (BenchMark Sims) is a community-made total conversion mod for Falcon 4.0. The mod, made by Benchmark Sims, is a complete revision of the aging game, adding such features like graphics improvements (DX7 -> DX11), 3D cockpits, a newer terrain engine, partial VR support, and multiplayer code improvements.

Falcon BMS is still under active development with the latest version (4.38) being released on 01 July 2025, and is available for download on the BMS website.

== Reception and impact ==
Reception

Aggregate scores
Aggregator	Score
GameRankings	83% (14 reviews)
Metacritic	85/100 (10 reviews)

Review scores
Publication	Score
Computer Gaming World	3.5/5
PC Gamer (UK)	91%
PC Gamer (US)	95%
PC Zone	95/100
Computer Games Strategy Plus	3.5/5
Macworld	4/5
MacAddict	"Freakin' Awesome!"

In the United States, Falcon 4.0 sold 41,209 copies during 1998, after its release on 12 December of that year. These sales accounted for $1.85 million in revenue. By October 1999, its total sales in the region had risen to 116,776 copies, which drew revenues of $4.57 million. It sold 209,000 copies during 1999 alone.

Falcon 4.0 won Macworld's 1999 "Best Flight Simulation" award. PC Gamer US likewise named Falcon 4.0 the best simulation of 1998. The game was a finalist for Computer Gaming World's "Best Simulation", GameSpot's "Simulation of the Year", IGN's "Best Simulation of the Year" and Computer Games Strategy Plus's "Simulation Game of the Year" awards, all of which ultimately went to European Air War. The editors of Computer Games Strategy Plus called Falcon 4.0 "extremely impressive", while those of Computer Gaming World described it as a sim with unprecedented detail.

The Falcon 4.0 series is one of the longest running game series in PC history to have used the same code base. The history of Falcon 4.0 spans over two decades due to derivatives like Falcon 4.0: Allied Force, the BMS derivative from 2012, and other variants.

== See also ==
- Jane's F-15
- F-16 Multirole Fighter
- F-16 Aggressor
