= M1 Tank Platoon =

1989 video game

- Cover art
- Developer: MPS Labs
- Publisher: MicroProse
- Designers: Arnold Hendrick; Scott Spanburg
- Platforms: Amiga, Atari ST, MS-DOS
- Release: 1989
- Genres: Simulation, real-time tactics
- Mode: Single-player

M1 Tank Platoon is a tactical simulator of tank warfare developed and published by MicroProse for the Amiga, Atari ST and MS-DOS in 1989. The game features a mixture of first-person, third-person tank warfare, and tactical simulation gameplay. It was followed by a sequel, M1 Tank Platoon II, released by MicroProse in 1998 for Windows. M1 Tank Platoon was sold to Interplay Entertainment in 2009. M1 Tank Platoon is available on Steam and Epic Games services.

== Gameplay ==
M1 Tank Platoon screenshot showing the gunners view

The player is put in the position of a main battle tank platoon commander in charge of four U.S. M1 Abrams tanks in a fictional campaign of battles against the Soviet Army in Central Europe. The player can give orders to friendly units via a tactical map of the battle area as well as taking control of a single tank - assuming the role of either the tank commander, driver or gunner. Between the battles, surviving crew members increase in military rank and skill—giving the player an incentive to keep their team alive.

Depending on the player's tastes, the whole game can be played more like an action/simulation game or like a strategy game. As platoon commander, direct control is limited to the four M1 tanks, however depending on the mission, support units like recon and attack helicopters, M2 Bradley infantry fighting vehicles, MLRS artillery systems or other older M60 Patton tanks are available and can be given orders via the tactical map.

One feature of the game is the ability to change the viewpoint to a supporting unit to get a "recon" from that unit's perspective. According to the manual, doing this from the M1 tanks was supposedly approximate to a tank commander standing on his tank hull to get a better perspective. The external view is also able to track other objects in the centre of the view; this is not limited to vehicles but can actually track missiles or even tank rounds.

The Campaign typically depicts the rush across the Rhine by the numerically superior enemy forces. The Campaign starts as defensive with the challenge being to use technologically superior NATO vehicles to stem the "wave" of Warsaw Pact vehicles. Success may result on the scenarios gradually putting NATO on the offensive side with objective waypoints to reach/hold.

Terrain is a very important factor as going hull down was a critical strategy to surviving. Full use of the supporting forces makes success easier with even the infantry disembarking from their IFVs to use M47 Dragon anti-tank launchers. However, leaving them in one position too long invited an artillery barrage from the opposing force.

== Reception ==
A United States Army Reserves officer and graduate of Armor School, Evan Brooks, stated in Computer Gaming World that M1 Tank Platoon was the first computer tank game to give the player control over four tanks instead of one. He favorably reviewed the game's documentation, internal and external graphics, and depiction of interdependent combat arms, and concluded that it was "the best armor simulator currently available". A General Dynamics Land Systems Simulation Lab software engineer, Dana Cadman, compared M1 Tank Platoon to other tank games of the time and the Army's SimNet training network in a later Computer Gaming World article. 1992 and 1994 surveys by the same author of wargames with modern settings gave the game four stars out of five. The game got 5 out of 5 stars in Dragon.

In 1990 Computer Gaming World named it as Simulation Game of the Year, and in 1996, the magazine ranked it as the 32nd best PC game of all time. In 1991, PC Format placed M1 Tank Platoon on its list of the 50 best computer games of all time. The editors wrote, "This is both a tank simulator and an excellent land combat game. Great graphics, gorgeous heavy weaponry, lots of strategy involved — can't go wrong really."

The game sold 400,000 copies worldwide.

== See also ==
- Tank: The M1A1 Abrams Battle Tank Simulation, a simulator released in 1989 by Spectrum HoloByte
- Team Yankee, a tactical simulator released in 1990 by Empire Interactive
- Super Battletank, a simulator released in 1992 by Absolute Entertainment
