= Falcon (video game) =

1987 video game

- North American cover art by Chris Butler and William Ervin
- Developers: Sphere, Inc. Rowan Software (Amiga, ST); Turbo Technologies (TG-16)
- Publishers: Spectrum HoloByte; Mirrorsoft (Amiga, CDTV, ST)
- Designers: Gilman Louie; Mark Johnson
- Artists: Bob Coston; Jody Sather; Jeff Stokol
- Series: Falcon
- Platforms: Macintosh, MS-DOS, Amiga, Atari ST, PC-98, Commodore CDTV, TurboGrafx-16
- Release: 1987 (Mac, DOS); 1988–1992 (ports)
- Genre: Combat flight simulator
- Modes: Single-player, multiplayer

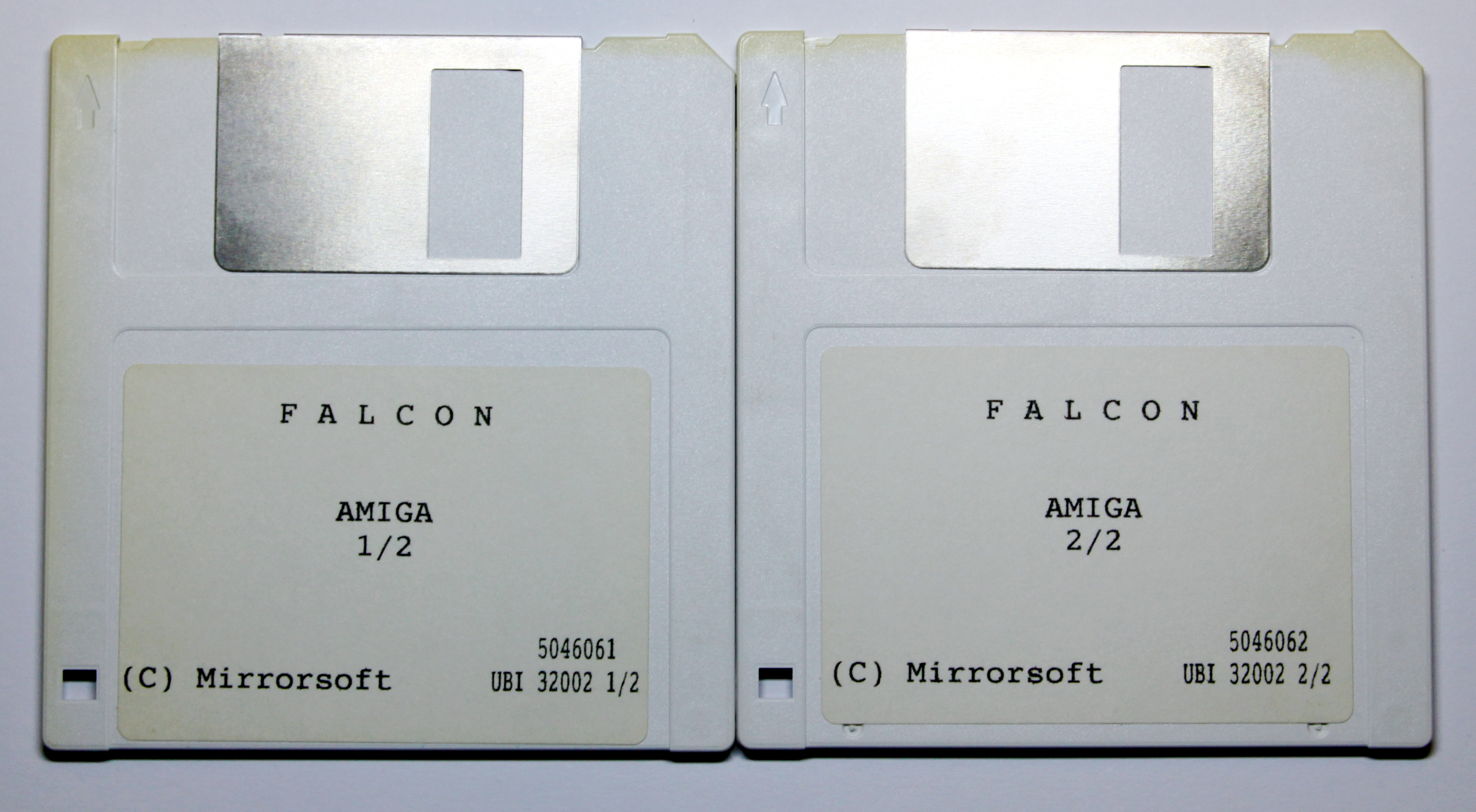
Commodore Amiga version

Falcon is a combat flight simulator video game and the first official entry (not counting the 1984's F-16 Fighting Falcon) in the Falcon series of the F-16 jet fighter's simulators by Spectrum HoloByte. Originally developed by Sphere for Macintosh and MS-DOS in 1987 and ported to several platforms between 1988 and 1992, the game earned commercial success and critical acclaim.

== Gameplay and development history ==
The Atari ST version of Falcon

The game was originally developed by Sphere, Inc. for the Macintosh and PC in 1987. Rowan Software ported Falcon for Spectrum HoloByte to the Atari ST in 1988 and Amiga in 1989, and the version for the CDTV was also published by Spectrum HoloByte and Mirrorsoft in 1992.

A Sega Genesis version intended to be compatible with the unreleased TeleGenesis Modem peripheral was planned but never released. In 1992, an updated release of the 1987 Macintosh version, called Falcon MC (Macintosh Color) was released; mostly identical to the original, but with color added. Turbo Technologies furthermore developed a less complicated version for the TurboGrafx-16 published by Spectrum HoloByte in 1992. A canceled Super NES version was also planned for early 1993. An Atari Jaguar version was also in development and planned to be published by Spectrum HoloByte in 1994 but it was never released for unknown reasons. A version for PC-98 was released in 1988 titled F-16 Fighting Falcon 2.

In the original Falcon, the players have their choice of flying one of 12 missions - with awards for flying missions at higher skill levels. There is a choice of different ground attack and air-to-air weapons, although these are also limited by several factors. For dogfighting, AIM-9J missiles are not as reliable as newer AIM-9L missiles - and are useless for head-on attack - but were typically the only missiles available. Because they are guided, AGM-65 missiles are easier to use than "iron dumb bombs" like the Mk 84, but ineffective against strengthened targets. An ECM pod provides defense against enemy missiles, but occupies an external hardpoint that can be used for additional weapons or fuel. The enemy occupies the western areas of the game's playable map - itself a large square divided into 9 smaller squares. Enemy targets were fixed sites on the ground. For defense, the unnamed enemy was limited to MiG-21 interceptors, and ground-launched missiles - either the SA-2s, which are launched from identified and fixed sites on the ground, or the SA-7s, which could be fired from portable launchers and can therefore appear anywhere.

Compute! joked in 1989 that Falcon "seemed harder to fly than the real plane". That year Spectrum Holobyte released an update that reportedly made control and landings much easier.

The Atari ST and Amiga versions of Falcon feature a semi-dynamic campaign where the player can roam the airspace, sweep for hostile aircraft, and attack ground targets. Destroyed buildings and SAM sites remain destroyed for fixed period of time, and hostile and friendly forces engage each other on the ground back and forth. Both of these versions have two expansion sets for them, Falcon Operation: Counterstrike and Falcon Operation: Firefight (released in Europe as Falcon Mission Disk Volume 2) in 1989-1990.

== Reception ==
Reception

Review scores
Publication	Score
Dragon	5/5 (MS-DOS)
Electronic Gaming Monthly	4.5/10 (TurboGrafx-16)
ST Action	85% (Atari ST)

Awards
Publication	Award
Golden Joystick Awards	Best 16-bit Simulation Game of the Year (1989)
Software Publishers Association	Best Action/Strategy Program, Best Technical Achievement, Best Simulation (1987)

Computer Gaming World in 1987 called Falcon as one of the most detailed and accurate flight simulators for the microcomputer market. It reported that an F-16 pilot with the 474th Tactical Fighter Wing "gave it good marks for accuracy". Dragon gave the MS-DOS version 5 out of 5 stars. Compute! praised Falcon's graphics, realism, and documentation.

Falcon won the 1987 Software Publishers Association awards for Best Action/Strategy Program, Best Technical Achievement, and Best Simulation. It was voted the "Best 16-bit Simulation Game of the Year" at the Golden Joystick Awards 1989. Falcon was ranked as the Amiga's eighth best game of all time by Amiga Power in 1991.

The four reviewers of Electronic Gaming Monthly gave the TurboGrafx-16 version a 4.5 out of 10, opining that the conversion was over-ambitious, since the compromises which were made in order to fit the game into a 4 MB cartridge made it unenjoyable. They particularly criticized the awkward and difficult controls and the limited amount of action.

Atari ST User gave Falcon a glowing review writing, "In fact the whole game is well presented – it's just about one of the most polished flight sims that I've ever come across."
