= Falcon 4.0: Allied Force =

2005 video game

- German box art
- Developer: Lead Pursuit
- Publisher: Graphsim Entertainment (Note: Distributed by Horizon Simulation in the United Kingdom and by Atari in Australia.)
- Series: Falcon
- Platforms: Windows, Mac OS X
- Release: Windows: NA: 28 June 2005; AU: 19 August 2005; EU: 23 September 2005; Mac OS X 23 September 2011
- Genre: Air combat simulation
- Modes: Single-player, multiplayer

Falcon 4.0: Allied Force (F4AF) is an F-16 based combat flight simulator released by Lead Pursuit in 2005. The game is based around a realistic simulation of the Block 50/52 F-16 Fighting Falcon in a series of missions in the Balkans.

The game engine is based on the source code of the original 1998 Falcon 4.0 from MicroProse, and consists largely of a collection of improvements from the official patches and extensive Falcon modding community. Allied Force also introduced several major new features and significant improvements in realism and stability.

== Gameplay ==
Falcon 4.0: Allied Force is a detailed simulation; like other simulations, it may take the user some time to become proficient and familiar with all of its features. Allied Force comes with a 716-page manual, which can act as a "quick start" guide to flying a military jet. The game focuses primarily on learning to fly and fight in an F-16, yet also allows the user to manage all the ground and air assets in a campaign if they wish, or control and vector fighters as part of an E-3 AWACS squadron.

The simulation allows the user to control the level of realism: the player can either set the realism settings on maximum, or enable options such as invulnerability and unlimited ammo; this may make the game easier for newcomers or players who wish to have a less realistic experience.

A player that enables many of the realism settings must work with his wingmen, friendly assets such as AWACS, JSTARS, airborne tankers, forward air controllers, and other friendly aircraft if he wishes to be successful.

The emphasis of the simulation's air combat is the use of beyond-visual-range missiles to destroy opponents many miles away, while maintaining the pilot's situational awareness. The player must therefore learn not only offensive tactics, but an ability to detect and counter a threat such as an incoming enemy missile. Due to the nature of beyond-visual-range fighting, within-visual-range (dogfighting) is rare in the game's campaign modes. There is, however, an "Instant Action" mode, where dogfighting may occur.

The game provides simulations and training missions for some common situations, such as: landing during an engine flameout, basic fighter maneuvers (BFM), navigation using on-board instruments, avoiding surface to air missiles (SAMs), and deploying various weapons against air and ground targets.

Dogfight mode allows the player to set up a situation in which dogfighting will take place. This is a single player or multiplayer mode. In multiplayer, two or more humans can combat one another over the Internet.

Tactical Engagement mode is where a player can build a mission with a number of customizable parameters, including the target, payload, enemy presence, customization of aircraft, etc. This is also a multiplayer mode.

The game includes a useful database including most ground vehicles, aircraft, weapons, and ships that are in the simulation. Each entry is presented with an image and text information on the subject.

In game, players can record parts of their flight which can then be reviewed later in the ACMI. Here the fight from any angle or viewpoint can be played, paused, rewound or forwarded through. Also information can be shown on the screen such as turn rate, speed, turn radius, and altitude to help a pilot ascertain where they may be going wrong.

=== Campaign mode ===
Falcon 4.0: Allied Force has a dynamic and customizable campaign. Once a player starts a campaign, the game will begin executing the campaign in real time. Thus, even when the player is not flying, other aircraft, ships, armies and anti-aircraft sites may still be fighting. This is represented to the player in a 2D map where objects can be displayed or hidden. The player can accelerate the campaign to 64X normal time, set up new flights, select weapons load-outs, view target areas and map waypoints before the time arrives for the next mission.

The campaign modes take place in the virtual battlefields of Korea and the Balkans, which can be configured based on historical data from 1999, 2005 or from how the area might appear in 2010. Each timeline will automatically change the type of weapons and sophistication of aircraft used in the campaign. The simulation includes the original Korean peninsula battlefield between North and South Korea. Here NATO forces support South Korea in various scenarios that can also involve China supporting North Korea. The campaigns can also be played online. The Balkan campaign focuses on NATO repelling a Serbian invasion of Albania.

== History ==
The game has been patched a number of times since its initial release. The final cumulative update is version 1.0.13.

Although the release of Falcon 4.0: Allied Force was meant to raise funds for a new version, dubbed "Falcon 5" to be developed, nothing eventuated from it. In 2011, Lead Pursuit was deregistered as a company. Further development on the original Falcon 4.0 source code has continued under two development communities: FreeFalcon and Benchmark Sims (BMS). FreeFalcon ended their efforts in 2013. BMS have continued development.

== Reception ==
Reception

Aggregate scores
Aggregator	Score
GameRankings	89% (9 reviews)
Metacritic	90/100 (7 reviews)

Review score
Publication	Score
GameSpot	8.9

Allied Force was a finalist for PC Gamer's "Best Simulation 2005" award, which ultimately went to Silent Hunter III. GameSpot notes that it took 7 years to reach a finished, playable state, but is now on par in terms of gameplay with contemporary flight sims. They give it an 8.9 for improved graphics, dynamic campaigns, enemies being challenging, and note its realism. The negative points given is that the graphics are lackluster.
