= Vette! =

1989 video game

- Developer: Sphere
- Publisher: Spectrum HoloByte
- Producer: Joe Scirica
- Designers: Dan Geisler; Gilman Louie
- Programmers: Dan Geisler; Jinda Pan; Sky Chang; Joe Tretinik; Kus Pranawahadi; Erick Jap
- Artists: Dan Guerra; Matt Carlstrom; Jody Sather
- Composer: Jinda Pan
- Platforms: MS-DOS, Macintosh, NEC PC-9801
- Release: NA: October 1989
- Genre: Racing
- Modes: Single-player, networked multiplayer

Vette! is a racing video game published by Spectrum Holobyte for MS-DOS compatible operating systems in 1989, followed by Macintosh and NEC PC-9801 ports. The objective is to race a Chevrolet C4 Corvette through the streets of San Francisco. The game uses a 3D, flat-shaded polygon rendering of the city, including landmarks such as the Golden Gate Bridge, the San Francisco Bay Bridge, and Lombard Street. It was released on three floppy disks in both a black and white and color version.

A Sega Genesis version was planned, but never released.

== Gameplay ==
- Car damage that affects the engine and handling.
- Full control over the game's camera views, including an interior cam with a full working dashboard.
- The ability to drive anywhere within the modeled city including highways, tunnels, and bridges.
- Pulling over at various gas stations that would repair the car.
- Being able to run people over.
- Driving erratically can attract the attention of a nearby cop, triggering a chase, which can result in getting pulled over. There are eight excuses to choose from unless charged for vehicular homicide by running over at least one pedestrian during the chase, or within close proximity of a cop.

At the beginning of the game, a question from the manual requires a correct answer to prove game ownership. If the question is falsely answered, the game can be played for a limited time before a window pops up claiming "You have been caught driving a stolen Vette!", followed by the game crashing.

== Development ==
During the development of this game, the attack on protesting Chinese students in Tiananmen Square occurred. In memory of that event, one of the programmers snuck this string into the program executable: "IN MEMORY OF THOSE WHO WERE MURDERED IN TIAN-AN-MEN SQUARE ON JUNE 4, 1989. J.P. "

== Reception ==
Tony Dillon of ACE praised Vette! for its "complexity of design combined with clever simplicity in presentation" and its varied gameplay, and opined that the game "doesn't quite have the edge over Stunt Car, but it sure isn't far behind." Peter Scisco of Compute! favorably reviewed the game, describing it as "Falcon AT on the ground." He praised the game's detail and EGA graphics, only criticizing the lack of sound card support, and concluded that "Vette! surpasses other driving simulations in its scope and realism".
