= M1 Tank Platoon II =

1998 video game

- North American cover art
- Developer: MicroProse
- Publisher: MicroProse
- Producer: Scott Spanburg
- Designer: Tim Goodlett
- Programmers: Scott Spanburg; Brian Whooley
- Artist: Michael R. Bates
- Composer: Roland J. Rizzo
- Platform: Microsoft Windows
- Release: NA: March 24, 1998; EU: 1998
- Genres: Vehicle simulation, real-time tactics
- Modes: Single-player, multiplayer

M1 Tank Platoon II (sometimes referred to simply as M1TP2) is a tank simulation video game developed and published by MicroProse Software in 1998 for Microsoft Windows. It is a simulator of the M1 Abrams main battle tank and a follow-up to MicroProse's 1989 release M1 Tank Platoon. M1 Tank Platoon II was sold to Interplay Entertainment in 2009. The game is available on Steam and Epic Games services.

== Gameplay ==
M1 Tank Platoon II allowed the player to play several positions in the four tanks that comprised the platoon. A player could play as a tank commander under cover ("buttoned up") or open on the hatch to man the .50 caliber machine gun. Other positions included gunner and an "outside 3-D scrolling view" of any unit on the battlefield.

Compared to the first M1 Tank Platoon, this game incorporated many new features, including much improved graphics as well as multiple campaigns, and multiplayer options. The ability to play as armored cavalry, USMC or army platoons added another dimension. The manual accompanying the game, over 100 pages, touched on such things as armor types, tactics, vehicles and more.

There was a patch available to upgrade the game to allow for improved machine gun and map performance.

== Reception ==
Reception

Aggregate score
| Aggregator | Score |
|---|---|
| GameRankings | 78% |

Review scores
| Publication | Score |
|---|---|
| AllGame | 4.5/5 |
| CNET Gamecenter | 7/10 |
| Computer Games Strategy Plus | 3.5/5 |
| Computer Gaming World | 2.5/5 |
| Game Informer | 7/10 |
| GameSpot | 8.2/10 |
| Next Generation | 4/5 |
| PC Gamer (UK) | 87% |
| PC Gamer (US) | 82% |
| PC Zone | 90% |

The game received favorable reviews. Next Generation said, "due to the depth of this simulation and the rather steep learning curve, M1 Tank Platoon II may prove to be an exercise in frustration rather than fun, but for the individual who truly wants to be 'Hell on Wheels,' this title is just the ticket."
