= Lawrence K. Grossman =

- Born: Lawrence Kugelmass Grossman; June 21, 1931; Brooklyn, New York City
- Died: March 23, 2018 (aged 86); Westport, Connecticut
- Education: Columbia University (BA); Harvard Law School
- Occupation: television executive
- Known for: former president of PBS and ABC News
- Spouse: Alberta Grossman

Lawrence Kugelmass Grossman (June 21, 1931 – March 23, 2018) was a cable television industry executive who served as president of PBS from 1976 to 1984 and headed NBC News from 1985 to 1988.

== Early life and career ==
Grossman was born Lawrence Kugelmass on June 21, 1931, in Brooklyn, New York. His father, Nathaniel H. Kugelmass, was a lawyer; his mother, the former Rose Goldstein, was a high school administrator. His father died when Lawrence was 3, and his mother later married Nathan Grossman, also a lawyer, who adopted him. He attended Midwood High School and graduated from Columbia College in 1952, where he studied English and political science. He spent a year at Harvard Law School and left to join Look magazine in the promotions department.

== Career ==
He was hired by the advertising department at CBS in 1956, then moved to NBC in 1962, becoming the network’s vice president of advertising. After leaving NBC, he ran his own advertising, marketing and communications firm until he was hired by PBS as its president in 1976.

=== President of PBS ===
As president of PBS, he was credited for transforming it into the first network to deliver its programming by satellite, introducing Live from Lincoln Center, launching the Frontline documentary series, and the 13-part documentary miniseries Vietnam: A Television History, and expanding The MacNeil/Lehrer Report (now known as PBS NewsHour) to one hour. He also received credit for standing up to pressure from members of the Congress and ExxonMobil to air Death of a Princess on public television. The film was controversial for its depiction of Saudi Arabian customs and provoked strong diplomatic responses from the Saudi government to the UK and the US.

=== President of NBC News ===
In 1984, he was appointed president of NBC News by network chairman Grant Tinker. He was responsible for bringing in Tim Russert as anchor, and helped engineer the turnaround of the channel that saw ratings slip in comparison to its competitors. Under his tenure, Today became the No.1 morning show and NBC Nightly News saw increase in the ratings. However, after General Electric brought the network in 1986, he clashed with Bob Wright and Jack Welch over budget cuts and was forced out in 1988, replaced by Michael Gartner.

Book: The Electronic Republic: Reshaping American Democracy in the Information Age (1995). https://www.amazon.com/Electronic-Republic-Reshaping-Democracy-Information/dp/0140249214

== Personal life ==
After leaving NBC News, he taught at the John F. Kennedy School of Government and teamed up with former FCC Chairman Newton Minow to launch Digital Promise, an initiative authorized by Congress in 2008 to promote “funding of research in using digital information technologies for teaching and learning.”

Grossman died at his home in Westport, Connecticut, on March 23, 2018, at 86. He is survived by his wife, three daughters, six grandchildren, and two great-grandchildren.
