= Starship Commander (1981 video game) =

1981 video game

- Developer: Gilman Louie
- Publisher: Voyager Software
- Platform: Apple II
- Release: 1981
- Genres: Space combat simulator, turn-based tactics
- Mode: Single-player

Starship Commander is a turn-based space combat simulator for the Apple II developed by Gilman Louie and published by Voyager Software. It was released in 1981 for US$39.95.

In the game, the player takes the role of a starship captain tasked with defeating a fleet of enemy ships. The player is scored based on how the enemy is defeated at the end of a gaming session.

== Gameplay ==
Players take up the role of a starship captain ordered to defeat an enemy fleet ranging from 1 to 3 ships. The player selects the number of ships and the type of each ship at the beginning of the game. The player can then defeat the enemy fleet by destroying them, forcing them to retreat, or surrender. To accomplish this, the player must provide commands to the different ship consoles each turn which includes communications, defense, engineering, life support, science, and weapons. At the end of each turn, the player and computer commands are executed and evaluated and the results displayed on the player's screen. The player can continue to play the next turns until the end of the game or save the game to be resumed later.

After the game ends, the player is evaluated based on how the game was won with points being assigned based on the different winning conditions and number of opponents.

== Reception ==
Computer Gaming World praised the game's level of detail and immersion, adding the graphics were a "mixed blessing as it adds mystique which makes role-playing more fun, but it makes it harder to figure out a winning strategy." The magazine also panned the game's documentation, stating it as "weak; it explains the commands and options but does not provide any insight into what is happening" but did close that "for those who are willing to dig for this understanding, the game offers considerable challenge and satisfaction."
