= Orbiter (1986 video game) =

1986 video game

- Publisher: Spectrum HoloByte
- Platforms: Atari ST, MS-DOS
- Release: 1986
- Genres: Educational video game, Simulation video game

Orbiter is a 1986 video game published by Spectrum HoloByte.

== Gameplay ==
Orbiter is a game in which the astronauts are launched into space, where they have the ability to deploy, retrieve, and repair satellites, and are also able to go on spacewalks in the Manned Maneuvering Unit in a space shuttle simulation.

== Reception ==
Frank Boosman reviewed the game for Computer Gaming World, and stated that "Orbiter is not a grip-the-sides-of-your-seat, sweat-running-down-your-forehead game. But if you really want to know how the Space Shuttle works or relive some of your childhood fantasies, then Orbiter is just the ticket."
