= ClockWerx =

1995 video game

- PC cover art featuring Alexey Pajitnov
- Developers: Callisto Corporation; Axes Art Amuse (Japanese ports)
- Publishers: Spectrum HoloByte (Macintosh, PC); Tokuma Shoten (Super Famicom, PlayStation, Sega Saturn)
- Composers: Peter Drescher (MAC, PC); Nori Atsumi (Japanese ports)
- Platforms: PC, Mac, Super Famicom, PlayStation, Saturn
- Release: 1995 (1996 for the PlayStation and Sega Saturn versions)
- Genre: Puzzle
- Mode: Single-player

ClockWerx is a puzzle video game created by Callisto Corporation that was released in 1995. The game was originally released by Callisto under the name Spin Doctor. Later, with some gameplay enhancements, it was published by Spectrum HoloByte as Clockwerx, which was endorsed by Alexey Pajitnov according to the manual. A 3DO Interactive Multiplayer version was planned but never released.

== Gameplay ==
The object of the game is to solve a series of increasingly difficult levels by swinging a rotating wand from dot to dot until the player reaches the "goal" dot. Enemy wands that kill the player if touched march in predetermined patterns around each level's grid. The design is such that, with careful timing, the player can swing through seemingly impassable groups of enemies. Players can also swing from the same dot as an enemy by staying on the opposite side of it, since most enemy wands rotate at the same speed. At higher levels, more enemies are introduced, such as doors that open and close when the player's wand passes over a switch, "hyperdots" that send players to a different dot, and drops of acid that follow the player around.

The player's wand is in continuous motion; the only control is to reverse its direction of rotation, or to swing to another dot. Players can also swing to another dot and reverse rotation at the same time. All player motion is controlled by just four keys (reverse direction immediately, "bounce" (reverse direction when your wand passes by another dot), move to another dot, and move and reverse direction simultaneously).

== Japanese ports ==
The game was released in Japan by Tokuma Shoten for the Super Famicom, PlayStation, and Sega Saturn under the title クロックワークス. The title screen in all games features Alexey Pajitnov, who endorsed (but did not work on) the Spectrum Holobyte release. Characters were introduced in the Japanese ports, and there are Clay animations in the PlayStation and Saturn games.

== Reception ==
Reception

Review scores
Publication	Score
Famitsu	21/40 (PS)
Next Generation	4/5
Computer Game Review	87/87/84
MacUser	3.5/5

Next Generation reviewed the Macintosh version of the game, rating it four stars out of five, and stated that "Using only four keys and two basic moves, ClockWerx will, nevertheless, keep you awake deep into the night." The game received a largely positive review from Computer Game Review. The magazine's Tasos Kaiafas wrote, "Don't throw your Tetris away yet, just minimize it for a little while."

== See also ==
- List of puzzle video games
