= Tornado (1993 video game) =

- Developer: Digital Integration
- Publisher: Spectrum HoloByte
- Platforms: Amiga, MS-DOS
- Release: 1993
- Genre: Combat flight simulator

Operation Desert Storm CD-ROM addon cover (1994)

A Tornado in low-level action over Europe (screenshot, 1993).

Tornado's mission planner with a complex multi-plane mission being planned (screenshot, 1994).

A Tornado in low-level action over Iraq in the Operation Desert Storm add-on (screenshot, 1994).

Tornado is a combat flight simulator video game developed by Digital Integration that models the Panavia Tornado. It was published by Spectrum Holobyte in 1993 for MS-DOS and Amiga. Tornado is one of the first flight simulations to offer head-to-head online dogfights.

== Gameplay ==
Tornado features high-speed, low-altitude precision bombing runs over a battlefield full of active friendly and enemy air and ground units. It allows the gamer to utilize all complex avionics in both positions of the two-person cockpit. The campaign mode contains a full-featured mission planner. Depending upon rank, the mission planner screen allows the gamer to plot strategies, gather intelligence data, pin-point targets, study mission briefings, draw flight plans (way points and air patrols), verify payloads, and view weather maps. It also provides the gamer with a three-dimensional view of any area of the map. The mission planner contains a dynamic battlefield map, which reflects the results of the player's latest missions. The mission planner allows the gamer to plot and synchronize attacks consisting of multiple flights of Tornados. The game came with a detailed 332 page printed manual, four full-sized color maps and a full-sized, foldable, keyboard reference card.

== History ==
Digital Integration based the Tornado modelling on publications in the public domain, research on open shelves and on the Tornado simulator at RAF Honington. The company consulted the Royal Air Force on various aspects of the game including turn rates, cockpit layout, workings of the weapons systems and wing-sweep mechanics. This authenticity was one of the major selling points of the game.

The Operation Desert Storm add-on was released in 1994. The add-on disk comes with a new desert flying area with 18 new missions, new ground objects for desert scenario, new aircraft and military vehicles, eight new airfields, sixty miles of fortified defences, improved ground force modelling and improved counter air effectiveness. The new warzone also supports campaign play like the original program. The colour schemes of the new aircraft, vehicles, ground objects, and 3D objects are updated for the new desert scenario.

== Reception ==
PC Zone's reviewer summarized Tornado with: "The more you play the deeper it gets - eventually you'll need a bathyscaphe. Not for beginners." Of the mission planner, he said: "[it] will impress you so deeply your socks will be blown off. […] it's absolutely incredible." On Tornado's faults, he highlighted the lack of shadow beneath the plane in external view, the use of a single crash sequence regardless of cause of death, the lack of mission replay facility, and the fact that "Digital Integration makes absolutely no concessions to the fact" the gamer had to micromanage both the pilot and navigator roles with their myriad of keystrokes in the heat of the battle. PC Zone gave Tornado a rating of 93%.

PC Review's reviewer described Tornado as "nothing short of comprehensive. […] if you want an accurate portrayal of what it's like to fly a Tornado and the sort of tactics you'll need to stay alive, then this is a superb product." On Tornado's shortcomings, he identified Tornado's weak explosion sounds and suggested that planes should be modeled to "spiral down out of the sky when hit." He also would have preferred to see mission planning involve other aircraft such as "the Apache Gunships and the A-10s." PC Review rated Tornado as 9/10.

Computer Gaming World's reviewer, an F-16 instructor pilot with the Vermont Air National Guard, approved of the accurate flight dynamics but disliked the "oddball" keyboard commands and lack of view modes. He especially criticized the air-to-air combat as "a farce", stating that the limited radar and view modes and poor graphical depictions of enemy aircraft made the game an "arcade reflex shooter"; further, modem play only permitted head-to-head air combat despite the Tornado's strike design. In a 1994 survey of wargames the magazine gave the title three-plus stars out of five, recommending it to "the serious flight jockey".

Tornado was named the best flight simulation of 1993 by Computer Games Strategy Plus. It was also a runner-up for Computer Gaming World's Simulation Game of the Year award in June 1994, losing to IndyCar Racing. The editors wrote that Tornado features "the most versatile and realistic mission planning approach that flight sim fans have ever been able to use". In 1994 PC Gamer UK named Tornado the 14th best computer game of all time. The editors wrote that its "level of long-term appeal and faultless attention to detail easily make Tornado the best flight sim going at the moment." Tornado was released on Steam on 17 September 2023, and on EpicGames on 16 September 2023.
