= Absolute Zero (video game) =

1995 video game

- Developers: Domark; Spectrum Holobyte
- Publisher: Domark
- Platforms: MS-DOS, Macintosh
- Release: 1995
- Genre: First-person shooter
- Mode: Single-player

Absolute Zero is a 1995 science-fiction flight sim first-person shooter, with action taking place over 30 missions in three locations. It was developed and published for MS-DOS and Macintosh by Domark. In some regions, it was published by Spectrum Holobyte. A 3DO Interactive Multiplayer version was planned but never released.

== Gameplay ==
Absolute Zero is set in the 24th century, on the frozen Jovian moon of Europa, where mankind has established a colony to extract water for fusion reactors. When one of the mining facilities accidentally discovers members of a long-buried alien race, the creatures awaken to slaughter all the miners and destroy the colony's capital city. Using only the minimal defensive equipment located on the colony, it's up to you to thwart the attack until help arrives.

Gameplay consists of 3D space combat action (though mostly on the moon's surface) with a twist: you don't play a specific character or campaign, instead you are placed on the shoes of different characters with each new mission. Each trying to do their best to survive using 7 different vehicles, from starfighters, to recon scouts, to ground-based turrets.

== Reception ==
Reception

Review scores
Publication	Score
Computer Gaming World	3.5/5
Computer Game Review	79/69/82
MacUser	4/5

The game was received with generally positive reviews. GameSpot said: "The story is well-conceived and fresh, following the lives of 24th century humans who have finally mastered cold fusion, and buzz around the solar system like busy bees."
