= Gato (video game) =

1984 video game

GATO
- Developers: Spectrum HoloByte; Xanth F/X (Atari 8-bit)
- Publishers: Spectrum HoloByte; Atari Corporation
- Designers: Paul Arlton; Ed Dawson
- Platforms: MS-DOS, Apple II, Atari 8-bit, Atari ST, Mac, Commodore 64
- Release: 1984: MS-DOS, Mac; 1985: Apple II; 1986: Atari ST; 1987: Atari 8-bit
- Genre: Submarine simulator
- Mode: Single-player

GATO is a real-time submarine simulator published in 1984 by Spectrum HoloByte for MS-DOS. It simulates combat operations aboard the Gato-class submarine USS Growler (SS-215) in the Pacific Theater of World War II. GATO was later ported to the Apple IIe, Atari ST, and Mac. In 1987, Atari Corporation published a version on cartridge for the Atari 8-bit computers, to coincide with the launch of the Atari XEGS.

== Gameplay ==
MS-DOS GATO with CGA graphics

The player is tasked with chasing Japanese shipping across a 20-sector map while returning for resupply as necessary from a submarine tender. The islands are randomly generated and not based on real-world geography. Combat is conducted using a screen with a view through the periscope and at various gauges and indicators. The game has multiple difficulty levels, the highest of which requires the player to translate mission briefings that are transmitted only as audible Morse Code.

The MS-DOS and Apple IIe versions contain a boss key which replaces the game screen with a spreadsheet.

== Development ==
Gato was developed by student programmers in Boulder, Colorado.

== Reception ==
Billboard magazine reported in June 1985 Gato coming in at number 6 of a national sample of retail sales and rack sales reports.

In 1985, Computer Gaming World praised the game for being simultaneously easy to play and having deep, detailed strategy. 1991 and 1993 surveys in the magazine of strategy and war games, however, gave it one and a half stars out of five, stating that "it was adequate in its time, but not exemplary in any regard". Compute! stated that "Gato promises realism, and it delivers ... [it] lives up to its claims". Jerry Pournelle wrote favorably of the game in BYTE, stating he wished he could slow the game down, but "I've certainly wasted enough time with it ... Recommended", and that he preferred the black-and-white Macintosh version to the color IBM PC version.
