= Star Trek Generations (video game) =

1997 video game

- Developer: MicroProse Alameda
- Publisher: MicroProse
- Designer: Erol Otus
- Programmer: Greg Blaha
- Artist: Erol Otus
- Writer: Steve Tsai
- Composer: Steven Scherer
- Platform: Windows
- Release: NA: May 21, 1997; UK: May 30, 1997
- Genre: First-person shooter
- Mode: Single player

Star Trek Generations is a 1997 first-person shooter with adventure and strategy elements by MicroProse Alameda and it was published by MicroProse, based on Star Trek Generations (1994), the seventh film in the Star Trek film franchise. It includes voice-acting by much of the cast of the film including actors Patrick Stewart, William Shatner, and Malcolm McDowell, as well as footage from the film.

== Story ==
The plot of the game is similar to that of the film: Captain Jean-Luc Picard and the crew of the Enterprise-D responds to a distress call from the Amargosa Observatory and Commander William Riker is sent over to investigate. Once there, he finds Dr. Tolian Soran, a scientist and madman hell bent on returning to the Nexus, a paradise dimension.

Soran escapes and the Enterprise goes on various missions to try to find him. To return to the Nexus, Soran intends on destroying stars in order to cause the Nexus (due to loss of the stars' gravity) to pass near Veridian III. The player needs to guess which planets Soran intends to destroy in order to pursue him.

Apart from being based on the film, the game is also related to Star Trek: The Next Generation – A Final Unity, since the aliens from that game, the Chodak, make an appearance. The overall science fiction universe of these titles is based on Star Trek: The Next Generation, a television show that aired between 1987 and 1994, itself developed from the earlier Star Trek show of the late 1960s.

== Gameplay ==
The game combines several video game genres, and follows the main non-linear philosophy of alternate paths to complete the game, followed in other Star Trek games.

The major portion of the game occurs in Stellar Cartography (also appearing in the film, although only for some minutes) where the player plans their next moves, the main opponents being time and Soran. This part of the game includes the strategic part where the player has to calculate and guess where Soran could be, in order to travel there and stop him before he destroys the system.

When a crew member beams to a planet or space station, the game switches to first-person action/adventure. The main objective of every away mission is finding and fighting with Soran, who beams away seconds before being killed by the player. The mission is then successful; however, not all away missions need to be successful to win the game.

Enemy ships are encountered while in space. The game then switches to pure tactical/simulator where the player controls the Enterprise against the enemy ship(s). The fighting system is simplified over the extremely difficult tactical part of A Final Unity.

== Development ==
Producer Simon Finch explained the game's storytelling philosophy: "We were trying to put the player into the situation that the characters were in the movie Generations, but we wanted to let them do what they wanted to do, and have the situations deviate fairly far from the film." Concerning the gameplay style, he commented, "We definitely wanted to teach players that violence isn't always the right solution, but we never wanted to water down gameplay by taking that option away from them."

== Reception ==
Reception

Review scores
Publication	Score
GameSpot	6.5/10
The Electric Playground	5.5/10

Star Trek Generations received mediocre reviews. Most critics said that while the away missions are interesting, particularly their puzzle elements, the stellar cartography and space combat portions are dull, though Vince Broady defended the space combat in a 2000 review of the game for GameSpot, contending that "this combat system is the best yet in a Star Trek game, and it provides a welcome respite from the drudgery of Stellar Cartography." Critics unanimously agreed that the inability to save in the middle of a mission was ill-considered and frustrating. Other common criticisms were that the controls are needlessly confusing and the graphics are primitive by contemporary standards. Critics did praise the use of sounds that were authentic to the film, such as the theme music and voice acting by Patrick Stewart and Malcolm McDowell.

GamePro took an optimistic look, summarizing that "While some significant flaws crop up, Generations still delivers a fun but mellow puzzle/adventure experience." Most reviewers, however, concluded that the game was not strong enough to appeal to anyone but Trekkies. Bonnie James of The Electric Playground also speculated that "Star Trek: Generations may have a difficult time being taken seriously as a cutting edge game due to the fact that it has appeared so long after the release of the film. In fact, there has been another Star Trek film released in the meantime [Star Trek: First Contact]."
