= Star Trek: The Next Generation – A Final Unity =

1995 video game

- Developer: Spectrum HoloByte
- Publishers: NA: Spectrum HoloByte; EU: MicroProse
- Producers: Mathias Genser; Meg Storey
- Designer: Mathias Genser
- Writers: Kyle Brink; Vera Chan; Stephen Goldin; Naren Shankar; Joe Ward
- Composer: Paul Mogg
- Series: Star Trek
- Platforms: MS-DOS, Classic Mac OS
- Release: NA: June 30, 1995; UK: July 7, 1995
- Genre: Adventure
- Mode: Single-player

Star Trek: The Next Generation – A Final Unity is an adventure game by Spectrum HoloByte, based on the Star Trek universe. It was released in 1995 for MS-DOS and ported to Classic Mac OS. The player controls Captain Picard and his crew of the Enterprise D and features traditional point-and-click adventure gameplay as well as freeform space exploration, diplomatic encounters, and tactical ship-to-ship combat.

The cast of Star Trek: The Next Generation reprise their roles, providing the voices of their respective characters.

== Plot ==
While on routine patrol of the Romulan neutral zone, the Enterprise intercepts a distress signal from the crew of a Garidian scout ship, seeking asylum in Federation space. After a brief confrontation with the commander of a Garidian Warbird (similar in design to a Romulan D'deridex Warbird except with a red starburst design on the nose), the crew of the scout ship is beamed aboard the Enterprise. One of the refugees mentions to Captain Picard that they are in search of the Lawgiver's legendary "Fifth Scroll", which could aid in preventing war on Garid. Picard agrees to assist them, and the crew of the Enterprise sets out in search of clues to the location of the scroll.

After searching various star systems and completing several away missions, the crew of the Enterprise finds the scroll on a planet littered with ruins belonging to the Chodak Empire—a vast alien civilization that disappeared practically overnight almost 900,000 years prior at the very peak of its power. As the refugees return to Garid with their scroll, the Romulans suddenly invade the Federation, though they seem to be avoiding combat while racing towards a nearby Federation-controlled nebula. Further investigation into their motives reveals that the Romulans hope to find an enormous and extremely-powerful Chodak machine known as the Unity Device, which had disappeared at the same time as the Chodak civilization itself. The situation escalates even further when a third, previously unknown alien race invades the Federation as well, sparking a three-way race to find the exact location where the device would reappear. (The Klingons, the Ferengi, and the Borg also make appearances in the game, although the latter only have an appearance as a Borg Cube in a later scene.)

The storyline takes place around stardate 47111.1, according to the opening sequence of the game. This would place the events of the game between the first two episodes of the seventh season of the series, "Descent" and "Liaisons". The non-canonical Chodak race first appear in Star Trek The Next Generation Future's Past and reappear in the Star Trek video games Star Trek Generations and Birth of the Federation.

== Gameplay ==
Main bridge

Gameplay is mostly linear in nature, sometimes branching partially depending on choices made during various conversations.

=== Enterprise ===
Tactical

On board the Enterprise, gameplay basically amounts to waiting until the ship arrives at its next destination, and occasionally conversing with various crewmembers for advice. There are various areas of the main bridge that can be interacted with to control the ship and consult with various people.

- The conference lounge allows the player to ask advice from the Garidian refugees.
- The Conn can be used to change the ship's destination and speed. When a mission begins destination and speed are set automatically, but the player has the liberty to visit bases, sectors and systems at will, though this will not affect anything in the main scenario.
- Various information on planets, alien species, and previous missions can be accessed from the Ops console, operated by Lt. Cmdr. Data.
- The tactical console is operated by Lt. Worf. Accessing it automatically brings the ship to red alert status. During the occasional battle with an enemy ship, control of the tactical console can be delegated to Lt. Worf, or controlled by the player.

The turbolift allows for access to other areas of the ship.

- From engineering, power levels can be adjusted and resources applied toward damaged systems can be designated. Control of engineering can be delegated to Lt. Cmdr. Geordi La Forge. Players can manipulate engineering to such a degree it is possible to cause a warp core breach or eject the warp core.
- In the transporter room, an away team can be assembled and an inventory chosen, though each mission has an automatically assigned away team (except on "Captain" difficulty, where the player can choose the team and equipment).
- On the holodeck, any previous cutscenes can be viewed, as well as a brief tutorial going over the various controls of the ship.

=== Away missions ===
The majority of the gameplay takes place by controlling an away team on various space stations and alien worlds, which is the pure adventure part of the game. The away team is selected by the player and is then controlled in a point-and-click manner by selecting the desired command from the interface in the lower area of the screen. Items in the inventory can be used to interact with the environment in much the same way.

As in most adventure games, inventory items are used to solve various puzzles. The comments and responses of the characters vary depending on the combination the player chooses.

Upon completion of the away mission, the team is beamed up, and the Enterprise awaits further orders or acts with the new information provided by the away mission.

=== Endings ===
Depending on choices made by the player, two different endings are possible: either a descendant of the Chodak race merges with the gestalt controlling the Unity Device, or the Device destabilizes, resulting in the Enterprise's destruction.

== Development ==
A Final Unity was originally penned for a release shortly after Interplay's Star Trek: 25th Anniversary. Since 25th Anniversary was released at the end of 1992, A Final Unity was scheduled to be released in 1993, but did not make the projected release date.

Seven principal actors of the TV show (Wil Wheaton is missing) plus Majel Barrett, the voice of the computer, were hired to reprise their roles in voice-overs for the game. A Final Unity was Spectrum HoloByte's second Star Trek video game, following the 1994 game Star Trek: The Next Generation – Future's Past. Spectrum Holobyte acquired MicroProse shortly thereafter, and continued developing Star Trek games under the MicroProse name. A version for the Atari Jaguar CD was reportedly in development by MicroProse but it never released.

A Final Unity officially required a floating-point coprocessor (FPU), which was unusual for MS-DOS games at the time. It could still be played on a computer not equipped with one, but at reduced performance.

== Reception ==
Reception

Review scores
Publication	Score
Computer Gaming World	4/5
Next Generation	3/5
PC Gamer (UK)	94%
PC Gamer (US)	74%
PCMag	4/4
Computer Game Review	91/93/90
MacUser	2.5/5
Electronic Entertainment	4/5
CD Player	7/10

A Final Unity was a commercial success, selling 500,000 copies by 1996.

Upon release, A Final Unity was met with generally positive reviews. Andy Butcher from PC Gamer UK noted that the game "translates the atmosphere and 'feel' of The Next Generation almost perfectly" and praised the way it is structured as well as its visual presentation and sound design. Computer Gaming World's Allen L. Greenberg criticized the game's tactical battles as "often tedious and inconclusive", but found the away missions "extremely enjoyable" and the game's overall presentation "impressive". Next Generation reviewed the PC version of the game, rating it three stars out of five, and stated that "If you're a fan of ST:TNG, you definitely don't want to miss A Final Unity. It's just the fix you need to hold you until the next movie or novel. But if you're simply looking for a good graphic adventure, you can find better." Rating it four stars out of four, PC Magazine said the game "manages to capture the look and feel of the series in surprising detail".

=== Accolades ===
A Final Unity was a runner-up for Computer Gaming World's 1995 "Adventure Game of the Year" award, which ultimately went to I Have No Mouth, and I Must Scream. The editors wrote of A Final Unity, "Despite inconsistent graphics and disappointing tactical combat, near-impeccable voiceovers from the stellar television cast made the game very compelling. Moreover, the game's script was at least as well written as many of the series' final episodes." In 1996, GamesMaster rated the game 53rd on their "Top 100 Games of All Time."

In 2016, Den of Geek ranked A Final Unity as one of the top four Star Trek games. In the same year, Tom's Guide ranked A Final Unity as one of the top ten Star Trek games. In 2017, PC Gamer ranked A Final Unity among the best Star Trek games. In 2020, ScreenRant ranked it the 2nd best Star Trek game of the franchise.
