= Star Trek: The Next Generation (1994 video game) =

- Developer: Spectrum HoloByte
- Publishers: Spectrum HoloByte (SNES); Sega (Genesis)
- Designers: Randy Angle; Sergio Vuskovic; Kurt Boutin
- Writers: Steve Olson; Stephen Goldin; Vera Chan
- Composer: Andrew Edlen (Genesis)
- Series: Star Trek
- Platforms: Super NES, Genesis
- Release: Super NES: NA: September 1994; EU: 1994; Genesis: NA: 1994
- Genre: Adventure
- Mode: Single-player

Star Trek: The Next Generation (subtitled Future's Past on SNES and Echoes from the Past on Sega Genesis) is a 1994 adventure game developed by Spectrum HoloByte. The game features strategy and puzzle-solving elements. The game was released for the Super Nintendo Entertainment System and Genesis. It takes place in the Star Trek universe, spanning Federation space and the Romulan Neutral Zone, and centers on the appearance of the IFD (Integrated Field Derandomizer), an artifact machine of unknown origin that, as its name suggests, allows its user to reshape matter and energy. It culminates in the IFD Trials, three tests undertaken by representatives of any races that are present when the Trials are held, and failure would mean the destruction of the Federation and the enslavement of countless worlds by the Federation's enemies.

== Plot ==
The USS Enterprise (NCC-1701-D) is in orbit around a red giant star near the edge of the Neutral Zone (the star adversely affects Romulan sensors, rendering the Enterprise undetectable). They are monitoring the border in response to increased Romulan activity; the Romulans recently lost contact with a vessel patrolling the Neutral Zone. Starfleet had agreed to assist in any investigation attempt as a sign of goodwill. The Romulans refuse the aid, and prefer to handle things on their own, which prompts Starfleet to increase border patrols.

Immediately upon beginning play, the Enterprise receives a distress signal, broadcasting on all frequencies. It was sent out by Dr. T'Laris, a Vulcan geologist stationed on a planet in the Codis Mu system (Codis Mu VI), and notes that her dig site was recently attacked by Romulans, and that the assailants are still present. The Enterprise responds to her plea for help and sets a course to her dig site.

The player character learns more about the missing Romulan vessel's mission, and of the IFD. The Enterprise also makes contact with an alien race known as the Chodak, hostile mollusk-like creatures who constantly accost the Enterprise as it traverses known space gathering clues about the IFD. There are also mentions of a now-extinct race called the Senatorious who were the last race to possess the IFD; the reason it resurfaced is because the Senatorious understood that they had been using the IFD for their own benefit at the cost of all other races, and judiciously decided to send it ten thousand years into the future, in the hopes that civilizations then could put the IFD to use for the mutual benefit of all races. There is one more race, the gaunt Eunacians, which are encountered only once and, after the Enterprise repairs their ship, tell Jean-Luc Picard of the IFD Trials and the Eunacians' intention to participate. However, with their ship crippled, and the rest of their race residing in the Gamma Quadrant, they entrust the Federation with recovery of the IFD, and its judicious use.

== Gameplay ==
Main bridge

Star Trek: The Next Generation is an adventure video game in which the crew of the Enterprise is investigating the relationship between the Romulans, an alien race called the Chodak, and a temporal device. The game plays as an episode of the series does, with the player controlling the crew and their interactions with other characters and areas. In-game areas include the main bridge, transporter room, conference room, alien ships, and planet surfaces.

The main bridge offers a large amount of interactivity. Here the player controls Captain Picard and interacts with each crew member, interviewing them to gain knowledge for the mission and to solicit opinions on how to proceed. The bridge has a variety of terminals, including the Conn, communications, engineering, the main computer, and access to the transporter room and conference room. The engineering terminal gives the player control over ship repair duties, in a similar style to the PC game Star Trek: The Next Generation – A Final Unity. The main computer offers a material to research for missions, and general information about the Star Trek universe. The Conn is the ship's navigational control and is where the player plots course and speed to various game destinations. In the conference room the crew is briefed regarding how to proceed at various points throughout the story, which functions as a hint system to proceed along the game's path.

A mission on a planet's surface

In the transporter room the player chooses which crew to send on the mission. Each crew member has stats that decide how effective he will be at certain tasks, such as tactical, technical, strength and health. Choosing a selection of characters that target the mission goals can make the gameplay much easier. At the destination, the player has individual access to each character and their inventory. The phaser, tricorder, and various specialized devices (such as medical equipment) are used in the game to interact with the environment.

In-game events are played out through conversations on the main bridge viewscreen, in-person on away missions and via short in-game animated cinematics. The game's intro mimics the intro of the television series.

=== Settings ===
The game has three different settings.

Bridge – Various interface stations allow the player to navigate, start away missions, and access the password system which can be used to play saved games at different points of the game.

Combat – Should an enemy attack the Enterprise, the red alert klaxons go off and the visual is transferred to a tactical grid that shows the Enterprise and the attacking ship. The player directly controls the ship, firing phasers and photon torpedoes while maneuvering. Damage sustained during these battles can either be repaired at the Engineering console on the bridge, or at one of the three starbases in the sector. Damage inflicted can affect various systems, such as being unable to beam down to away missions, unable to access navigation, blurred and garbled communications, or ship destruction.

Away Mission – The player controls four members of an away team. The player can control each one in turn by switching to the respective portrait. Certain characters have different abilities based on their service branch.

== Release ==
A version of the game for the Atari Jaguar was announced in early 1994 and was in development by Spectrum HoloByte but it was never released, despite being advertised in video game magazines at the time. Similarly, a version for the Sega CD was announced and previewed by magazines, but never released.

== Reception ==
Reception

Review scores
| Publication | Score |
|---|---|
| Electronic Gaming Monthly | 9/10, 7/10, 6/10, 8/10 (SNES) |
| Famitsu | 6/10, 4/10, 6/10, 5/10 (SNES) |

Electronic Gaming Monthly praised the sound effects for their successful emulation of the TV show, but criticized that the gameplay is "slow-paced" and "boring at times". They nonetheless concluded that the game is "a must have" for fans of the show. GamePro was somewhat more critical of the SNES version. Though they praised the sound effects and attention to detail with Star Trek lore ("Even Star Trek's previously undecipherable galaxy classification and navigation systems are now understandable – and useful"), they argued that the game failed to capture the spirit of the show, particularly in that it does not offer players the option to negotiate for peace with their adversaries. They also cited poor collision programming, but concluded the game to be "a solid action-packed adventure". Released in Japan on November 17, 1995, it was reviewed by the four critics in Famicom Tsūshin. One reviewer found the game old fashioned, while another said even Trekkies will be disappointed. One reviewer found the puzzle sequences fun while the fourth reviewer said the action sequences were really poor..

The Genesis version was slightly less well received than the SNES version. Electronic Gaming Monthly gave it a 6.25 out of 10, saying that the controls and gameplay design are very frustrating and difficult to get into, though they again stated that fans of the show would enjoy the game. GamePro praised the authentic Star Trek details, but like EGM they found the controls frustrating, and concluded by saying that anyone making a choice between the two versions of the game should buy the SNES version instead.
