= Tetris (Spectrum HoloByte) =

1988 video game

- North American MS-DOS box art
- Publishers: NA: Spectrum HoloByte; EU: Mirrorsoft
- Programmers: IBM CGA; Eng An Jio; Tandy; Billy Sutyono; IBM EGA; Aryanto Widodo
- Artist: Dan Guerra
- Series: Tetris
- Platforms: MS-DOS: Commodore 64; Apple II; Apple IIGS; Amiga; Macintosh; Macintosh II; Atari ST
- Release: January 27, 1988: MS-DOS; UK: January 27, 1988; NA: January 29, 1988 Apple II, IIGS, Macintosh; NA: July 1988 Amiga, Macintosh II; NA: December 1988 Atari ST; NA: March 1989
- Genre: Puzzle
- Mode: Single-player

Tetris is a 1988 video game published by Spectrum HoloByte in the United States and Mirrorsoft in the United Kingdom. It was the first commercial release of Tetris, a puzzle game developed in the Soviet Union in the mid-1980s, and was released on multiple home personal computer systems. Tetris received positive reviews overall, winning multiple Excellence in Software Awards, and would eventually sell over one million copies.

== Development ==
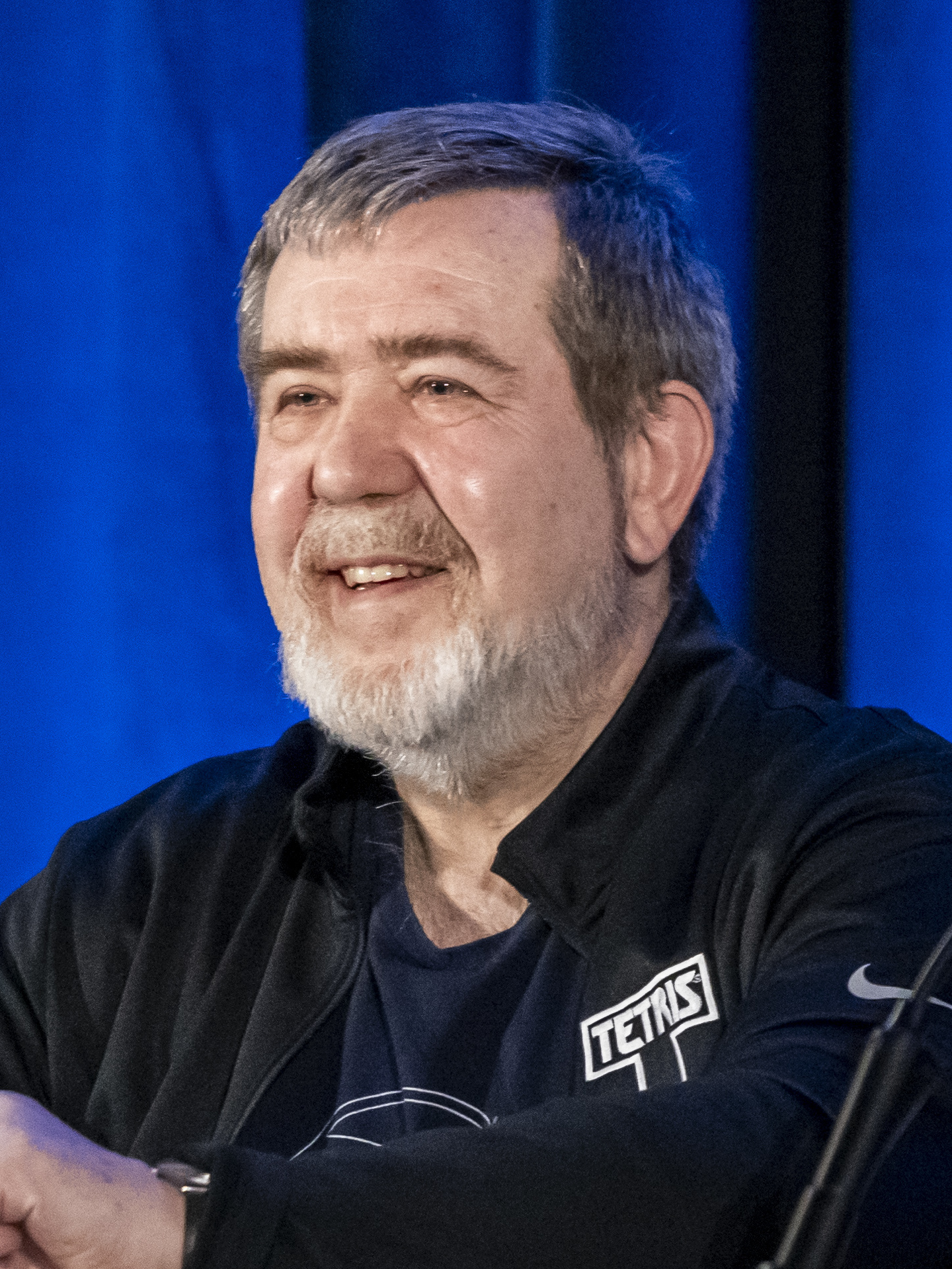
Alexey Pajitnov (pictured in 2024), the creator of Tetris.

Tetris was created by Alexey Pajitnov in the Soviet Union. Pajitnov wanted to export Tetris, but had no knowledge of the business world. His superiors in the Academy of Sciences of the Soviet Union were not necessarily happy with the success of the game, since they had not intended such a creation from the research team. Furthermore, copyright law of the Soviet Union created a state monopoly on import and export of copyrighted works, and the Soviet researchers were not allowed to sell their creations. Pajitnov asked his supervisor Victor Brjabrin, who had knowledge of the world outside the Soviet Union, to help him publish Tetris. Pajitnov offered to transfer the rights of the game to the Academy, and was delighted to receive a non-compulsory remuneration from Brjabrin through this deal.

In 1986, Brjabrin sent a copy of Tetris to the Hungarian game publisher Novotrade. From there, copies of the game began circulating via floppy disks throughout Hungary and as far as Poland. Robert Stein, an international software salesman and owner of the London-based firm Andromeda Software, saw the game's commercial potential during a visit to Hungary in June 1986. After an indifferent response from the Academy, Stein contacted Pajitnov and Brjabrin by fax to obtain the license rights. The researchers expressed interest in forming an agreement with Stein via fax, but they were unaware that this fax communication could be considered a legal contract in the Western world; Stein began to approach other companies to produce the game.

Gameplay screenshot from the MS-DOS version

Stein approached publishers at the 1987 Consumer Electronics Show in Las Vegas. Gary Carlston, co-founder of Broderbund, retrieved a copy and brought it to California. Despite enthusiasm amongst its employees, Broderbund remained skeptical because of the game's Soviet origins. Likewise, Mastertronic co-founder Martin Alper declared that "no Soviet product will ever work in the Western world". Carlston regretted turning down what he described as "the worldwide rights to Tetris for $50,000 ... People have tried to make me feel better about my decision by telling me about everything Henk Rogers went through to get the rights, but yeah, I should have accepted the game."

Stein ultimately signed two agreements: he sold the European rights to the publisher Mirrorsoft and the American rights to its sister company Spectrum HoloByte. The latter obtained the rights after a visit to Mirrorsoft by Spectrum HoloByte president Phil Adam in which he played Tetris for two hours. At that time, Stein had not yet signed a contract with the Soviet Union. Nevertheless, he sold the rights to the two companies for £3,000 plus a royalty of 7.5 to 15% on sales.

== Release ==
Before releasing Tetris in the United States, Spectrum HoloByte's CEO Gilman Louie asked for an overhaul of the game's graphics and the addition of music. The Soviet spirit was preserved, with fields illustrating Russian parks and buildings as well as melodies anchored in Russian folklore of the time. The company's goal was to make people want to buy a Russian product. The game came complete with a red package and Cyrillic text, an unusual approach on the other side of the Berlin Wall.

Spectrum HoloByte's version of Tetris was released for MS-DOS PCs in the UK on January 27, 1988, and in the US on January 29. Other platforms followed over the next year. The versions for the Macintosh, Macintosh II, Apple IIGS, Amiga, and Atari ST included a six-player tournament mode, an advanced mode, and music.

Mirrorsoft would release additional versions of Tetris for other home computers in the European market within a few months of the release of the MS-DOS version, such as the Commodore 64, Amstrad CPC, BBC Micro, MSX and the ZX Spectrum.

== Reception ==
Reception

Review scores
Publication	Score
AllGame	C64: 3/5; Macintosh: 4/5
Zzap!64	98%

Award
Publication	Award
Zzap!64	Gold Medal

Tetris was a commercial success in Europe and the United States: Mirrorsoft sold tens of thousands of copies in two months, and Spectrum HoloByte sold over 100,000 units in the space of a year. Within two years, the game sold 150,000 copies for $6 million ($16 million adjusted for inflation). By 1995, the versions sold more than 1 million copies, with women accounting for nearly half of Tetris players, in contrast to most other PC games. According to Spectrum HoloByte, the average Tetris player was between 25 and 45 years old and was a manager or engineer. At the Software Publishers Association's Excellence in Software Awards ceremony in March 1988, Tetris won Best Entertainment Software, Best Original Game, Best Strategy Program, and Best Consumer Software.

The IBM version received positive reviews. Compute! called it "one of the most addictive computer games this side of the Berlin Wall ... [it] is not the game to start if you have work to do or an appointment to keep. Consider yourself warned". Orson Scott Card joked that the game "proves that Russia still wants to bury us. I shudder to think of the blow to our economy as computer productivity drops to 0". Noting that Tetris was not copy-protected, he wrote: "Obviously, the game is meant to find its way onto every American machine". Hartley, Patricia, and Kirk Lesser in "The Role of Computers" column of Dragon No. 135 gave the version 4.5 out of 5 stars. Roy Wagner reviewed the game for Computer Gaming World the same year, and said that "Tetris is simple in concept, simple to play, and a unique design".

The Macintosh version also received positive reviews. Macworld praised its strategic gameplay, stating that "Tetris offers the rare combination of being simple to learn but extremely challenging to play", and also praising the inclusion of the Desk Accessory version, which uses less RAM. Macworld summarized their review by listing Tetris' pros and cons, stating that Tetris is "elegant; easy to play; challenging and addicting; requires quick thinking, long-term strategy, and lightning reflexes" and listed Tetris' cons as "None". The Lessers gave the version 5 out of 5 stars in Dragon No. 141.

In their June 1989 issue, Zzap!64 awarded the Commodore 64 version a score of 98%, the joint highest score in the history of the magazine.
