= Spectrum HoloByte =

American video game developer and publisher

MicroProse Alameda
- Formerly: Spectrum HoloByte, Inc. (1983-1996)
- Type: Public
- Traded as: Nasdaq: SYBT
- Industry: Video games
- Founded: 1983; 43 years ago
- Founders: Jeff Sauter, Phil Adam and Mike Franklin
- Defunct: 1999; 27 years ago
- Fate: Absorbed into Hasbro Interactive
- Successor: Hasbro Interactive
- Headquarters: Alameda, California, US
- Key people: Gilman Louie; Phil Adam
- Parent: Sphere, Inc. (1987–1992); MicroProse Inc. (1993–1999)

Spectrum HoloByte, Inc. (later known as MicroProse Alameda) was an American video game developer and publisher. The company, founded in 1983, was known for its simulation games, notably the Falcon series of combat flight simulators, and for publishing the first version of Tetris outside the Soviet Union (in 1988 for MS-DOS). Spectrum HoloByte published games for various home computers and video game consoles.

== History ==
=== Origins ===
Spectrum HoloByte was founded in 1983 in Boulder, Colorado, by Jeff Sauter, Phil Adam and Mike Franklin. The name came from terms, spectrum was coming from the color, holo was meant to be 3D or holography and byte meaning computer.

The company's first hit was a game called GATO, which was a hit for learners. The company made another hit with the game without copy protection, Orbiter, which was another breakout.

=== Merger with Nexa ===
In 1987 Spectrum HoloByte merged with another game developer, Nexa Corporation, forming a common holding company, Sphere, Inc., which was owned by Pergamon Press, who had a 89% share in the company, and prompting the company's move from Colorado to California, with Nexa and Spectrum HoloByte as brands. Nexa founder Gilman Louie served as chairman of the combined company.

The company then signed a distribution deal with distributor Mirrorsoft to become the company's European distributor, while the company begin distributing Mirrorsoft's titles for North America. The company made its biggest move and breakout success when its title Tetris become the company's best-selling title for home computers. The success led to a sequel to Tetris for home computers, called Welltris.

In 1989, the company was awarded a third-party license for the Sega Genesis, and its first title was intended to be Falcon, but scrapped at the last minute. In 1990, the company made its move when the company licensed Vette to Sega of America for the Sega Genesis, but never came to fruition.

In April 1991, the company, via Sphere, Inc. launched a joint venture with Mirrorsoft, Arena Entertainment to release games for platforms like Amiga and Sega Genesis, before Mirrorsoft was sold to Acclaim in 1992, allowing Acclaim to purchase Arena Entertainment from Mirrorsoft and Spectrum HoloByte. Only three games were released under the venture, including Back to the Future Part III, Battlemaster, and Speedball 2: Brutal Deluxe, all for the Genesis, before Arena was sold to Acclaim.

=== Reorganization, merger with MicroProse and closure ===
In 1992, Spectrum HoloByte received an investment from Kleiner Perkins, which let the company repurchase shares formerly owned by Robert Maxwell's companies, after the death of Robert Maxwell, ending its ties to their bankruptcies. In early 1992, the company entered into an agreement with Horizon Entertainment and W Industries to create a new firm Cyberstudio, designed to create firms for the Virtuality Entertainment System.

Also in 1992, the company signed a deal with MicroProse where it became its new European distributor after Mirrorsoft was sold to Acclaim, signed a licensing deal with Paramount Pictures to make video games based on Star Trek: The Next Generation, and then the company then made their first true home console game in 1992, Wordtris, for the SNES and Game Boy, a port of the home computer game.

In late 1992, the parent company was reincorporated from Sphere, Inc. to Spectrum HoloByte, Inc. to reflect the business. In 1993, the company acquired the North American business of video game publisher Bullet-Proof Software. In December 1993, Spectrum HoloByte, Inc. merged with MicroProse, who was distributing Spectrum HoloByte's games in Europe, to form MicroProse Inc.

For the following years, games from both companies were published under their respective brands, but in 1996 all titles were consolidated under the MicroProse brand, with the Alameda headquarters continued to be used on its titles developed at the former Spectrum HoloByte sttaff. In 1995, the company had bought out Simtex. The company was an early adapter of Nintendo 64, as no titles came out under the label.

Hasbro Interactive acquired the merged company in 1998, and what had been Spectrum HoloByte ceased to exist when the development studio in Alameda, California, was closed in 1999.

== Games ==
Title	Year and platform	Developer	Publisher
GATO	1984 (MS-DOS, Mac); 1985 (Apple II, C64); 1986 (Atari ST); 1987 (Atari 8-bit)	Spectrum HoloByte	Spectrum HoloByte; Atari Corporation (Atari 8-bit)
Orbiter	1986 (MS-DOS, MacOS); 1988 (Atari ST)	Spectrum HoloByte; Sphere, Inc. (Atari ST)	Spectrum HoloByte
Intrigue!	1986 (Apple II, C64)	Kinemation	Spectrum HoloByte
Lunar Explorer: A Space Flight Simulator	1986 (Apple II, DOS)	Spectrum HoloByte	Electric Transit
Solitaire Royale	1987 (MS-DOS, Mac); 1988 (Amiga); 1989 (Apple IIGS), MS-DOS, Mac, MSX, PC-88, PC-98, Sharp X1	Software Resources International	Spectrum HoloByte
Falcon	1987 (MS-DOS, Mac); 1988 (Atari ST); 1989 (Amiga); 1991 (CDTV)	Sphere, Inc.	Spectrum HoloByte
Dondra: A New Beginning	1987 (Apple II); 1988 (Apple IIGS); 1989 (MS-DOS)	Spectrum HoloByte	Spectrum HoloByte; Electronic Arts (MS-DOS)
PT-109	1987 (MS-DOS, Mac)	Digital Illusions	Spectrum HoloByte
Zig Zag	1987 (C64)	Zig Zag Software	Spectrum HoloByte
Tetris	1988 (Amiga, Apple II, Apple IIGS, MS-DOS, Mac); 1989 (Atari ST)	Spectrum HoloByte	Spectrum HoloByte
Soko-Ban	1988 (MS-DOS); 1988 (Apple II, C64)	ASCII, Thinking Rabbit	Spectrum HoloByte
Falcon A.T.	1988 (MS-DOS)	Sphere, Inc.	Spectrum HoloByte
Vette!	1989 (MS-DOS); 1991 (MacOS)	Sphere, Inc.	Spectrum HoloByte
Falcon Operation: Counterstrike	1989 (Amiga, Atari ST)	Rowan Software	Spectrum HoloByte
Tank: The M1A1 Abrams Battle Tank Simulation	1989 (MS-DOS)	Sphere, Inc.	Spectrum HoloByte
Welltris	1989 (MS-DOS); 1990 (Mac, Amiga, Atari ST)	Doka, Sphere, Inc.	Spectrum HoloByte; Infogrames (Amiga, Atari ST)
Faces...tris III	1990 (MS-DOS, Mac); 1991 (Amiga)	Sphere, Inc.	Spectrum HoloByte
Stunt Driver	1990 (MS-DOS)	Sphere, Inc.	Spectrum HoloByte
Flight of the Intruder	1990 (MS-DOS); 1991 (Amiga, Atari ST)	Rowan Software; Spectrum Holobyte (Amiga, Atari ST)	Spectrum Holobyte; Mirrorsoft (Amiga, Atari ST)
Falcon Operation: Firefight	1990 (Amiga, Atari ST)	Rowan Software; Sphere, Inc.	Spectrum HoloByte
Super Tetris	1991 (MS-DOS, Windows 3.x); 1992 (Amiga, Mac)	Sphere, Inc.	Spectrum HoloByte
Falcon 3.0	1991 (MS-DOS); 1992 (TG-16)	Sphere, Inc. Spectrum HoloByte (TG-16)	Spectrum HoloByte; Turbo Technologies (TG-16)
Falcon MC (Macintosh Color)	1992 (Mac)	Spectrum HoloByte	Spectrum HoloByte
Crisis in the Kremlin	1992 (MS-DOS)	Barbu Corporation, Spectrum HoloByte	Spectrum HoloByte
Wordtris	1991 (MS-DOS); 1992 (Game Boy, SNES); 1993 (Mac)	Spectrum HoloByte; Armenica (MS-DOS)	Spectrum HoloByte; Sphere, Inc. (Game Boy); Nintendo (SNES)
Falcon 3.0: Operation: Fighting Tiger	1992 (MS-DOS)	Sphere, Inc.	Spectrum HoloByte
Tetris Classic	1992 (MS-DOS, Windows 3.x)	Spectrum HoloByte	Spectrum HoloByte
Iron Helix	1993 (Mac, Windows 3.x); 1994 (Sega CD)	Drew Pictures	Spectrum HoloByte
Tetris Gold	1993 (MS-DOS, Mac, Windows 3.x)	Sphere, Inc.	Spectrum HoloByte
Hornet: Naval Strike Fighter	1993 (MS-DOS)	Spectrum HoloByte	Spectrum HoloByte
National Lampoon's Chess Maniac 5 Billion and 1	1993 (MS-DOS)	Spectrum HoloByte	Spectrum HoloByte
TinHead	1993 (Genesis)	MicroProse	Ballistic
Soldiers of Fortune	1993 (Genesis, SNES)	The Bitmap Brothers	Spectrum HoloByte
MiG-29: Deadly Adversary of Falcon 3.0	1993 (MS-DOS)	Spectrum HoloByte	Spectrum HoloByte
Tornado	1993 (MS-DOS)	Digital Integration	Spectrum HoloByte
Gazillionaire	1994 (Windows 3.x)	LavaMind	Spectrum HoloByte
Out of the Sun	1994 (MaS)	Domark	Eidos Interactive
Formula One	1994 (MS-DOS)	Lankhor	Domark
Star Trek: The Next Generation - Futures Past	1994 (Genesis, SNES)	Spectrum HoloByte	Spectrum HoloByte; Sega (Genesis)
BreakThru!	1994 (SNES, Windows 3.x, MS-DOS); 1995 (GB)	Zoo Corporation (Windows, MS-DOS); Artech Digital Entertainment (SNES); Realtime Associates Seattle Division (GB)	Spectrum HoloByte
Falcon Gold	1994 (MS-DOS)	Spectrum HoloByte	Spectrum HoloByte
Fields of Glory	1994 (MS-DOS)	MicroProse	Spectrum HoloByte
WildSnake	1994 (Game Boy, SNES)	Bullet-Proof Software (GB); Manley & Associates (SNES)	Spectrum HoloByte
Lords of Midnight	1995 (MS-DOS)	Maelstrom Games	Domark
ClockWerx	1995 (Mac, Windows)	Callisto Corporation	Spectrum HoloByte
Reflux: Issue.01 - "The Becoming"	1995 (Mac, Windows 3.x)	Inverse Ink	Inverse Ink
Reflux: Issue.02 - "The Threshold"	1995 (Windows 3.x)	Inverse Ink	Inverse Ink
Star Trek: The Next Generation – A Final Unity	1995 (MS-DOS, Mac)	Spectrum HoloByte	Spectrum HoloByte
Qwirks	1995 (Mac, Windows, Windows 3.x)	Big Bang Software	Spectrum HoloByte
Perfect Partner Bridge	1995 (Mac, Windows 3.x)	Positronic Software	Spectrum HoloByte
Absolute Zero	1995 (MS-DOS, Mac)	Domark	Domark
Knight Moves	1995 (Windows)	Kinesoft	Spectrum HoloByte
Curse of Dragor	1995 (Mac)	Banshee Software	Domark
Top Gun: Fire at Will!	1996 (MS-DOS, Mac, PlayStation, Windows)	Spectrum HoloByte	Spectrum HoloByte; MacSoft (Mac)
Star Trek: Generations	1997 (Windows)	MicroProse Alameda	MicroProse
Falcon 4.0	1998 (Mac, Windows)	MicroProse Alameda	Hasbro Interactive
Star Trek: Birth of the Federation	1999 (Windows)	MicroProse Alameda	Hasbro Interactive
