= Battle Trek =

1981 video game

- Developer: Voyager Software
- Publisher: Voyager Software
- Platforms: Atari 8-bit, TRS-80
- Release: 1981: TRS-80; 1982: Atari 8-bit

Battle Trek is a video game written by Gilman Louie for the TRS-80 published by Voyager Software in 1981. A version for Atari 8-bit computers followed in 1982.

== Gameplay ==
Battle Trek is a game in which the player commands the starship USS Ranger against the enemy Vegans.

== Reception ==
The game received positive reviews from contemporary gaming critics. Hosea Battles, Jr. reviewed Battle Trek for Computer Gaming World. He praised the game's tactical intensity, describing it as "quite exciting," and highlighted the engaging gameplay mechanics by noting he was "constantly torn between redistributing power and firing weapons."
