= Wordtris =

1991 video game

- Developers: Armenica (MS-DOS); Realtime Associates
- Publisher: Spectrum HoloByte
- Designers: Sergei Utkin; Vyacheslav Tsoy; Armen Sarkissian
- Composers: Ed Bogas; Paul Mogg (SNES)
- Platforms: MS-DOS, Game Boy, Mac, Super NES
- Release: 1991
- Genre: Puzzle
- Modes: Single-player, multiplayer

Wordtris is a Tetris offshoot designed by Sergei Utkin, Vyacheslav Tsoy and Armen Sarkissian (who later became President of Armenia) and published by Spectrum HoloByte in 1991 for MS-DOS compatible operating systems. Ports were released for the Game Boy and Super Nintendo Entertainment System in 1992, followed by a Mac version in 1993.

== Gameplay ==
The object of the game is to build words of three letters or more using the tiles that fall from the top of the playing area. Words can be constructed horizontally or vertically, and multiple words can overlap each other. If the player manages to construct the magic word at the top of the screen, the well will be cleared of all tiles and the player will receive a large bonus.

Occasionally, a free tile (denoted by a "?") will drop. Its letter can be selected by the player (either by typing it in the PC version, or scrolling through letters with a button on the console versions). If the player does not choose a letter, the block will become a random letter when it stops. Eraser blocks will fall and remove whatever letter that they land on (in the SNES version, the eraser is replaced with bombs and vials of acid).

In the Super NES version, players advance from levels "A" to "J."

== Development ==
The background pictures (except the title screen) were taken from Spectrum Holobyte's earlier Super Tetris.

The MS-DOS, Game Boy, and Macintosh versions of Wordtris have original music by Ed Bogas, while the Super NES music is by Paul Mogg. While the Game Boy and SNES versions contain looping music, the other ports do not. Bogas composed the soundtrack for Wordtris using his own music software Super Studio Session for the Macintosh, in which his MIDI files were converted to the game in MIDI format. For the SNES version, Mogg composed his music using Studio Vision Pro, also for the Macintosh. David Warhol provided sound engines and musical arrangements for both the Game Boy and SNES versions.

== Reception ==
Reception

Aggregate score
Aggregator	Score
GameRankings	56.33% (SNES); 54% (GB)

Computer Gaming World stated that "Wordtris, like its predecessors, is as infuriating as it is incredibly addictive ... Tetris is a classic game. Wordtris does it one better." The SNES version of the game was scored a 65% by N-Force Magazine.
