= Callisto Corporation =

American software company

Callisto Corporation was a software development company founded by Robert Harris, Mike Barta and Seth Lipkin in May 1989. Prior to founding the company, all three worked at GCC Technologies.

They were best known for their series of computer games for the Macintosh in the 1990s, including ClockWerx, Spin Doctor, Super Maze Wars and Super Mines. They also were contracted out to work on the software titles Math Blaster, Reading Blaster, and Typing Tutor. From 1990 to 1992, they created and expanded Meeting Maker, a networked meeting-scheduling product. In 1991, Callisto sold Meeting Maker to ON Technology.

From 1997 to 2007, the company focused on consumer digital photo software, which resulted in PhotoParade. In mid-2008, the PhotoParade.com web site was changed to indicate that direct emailing of PhotoParade files would no longer be supported. At the same time, all links to support and purchasing options were removed from the website.

Callisto Corp. operated independently in Natick, Massachusetts.

== Callisto Software, Inc. ==
Another company called Callisto Software, Inc., based in Wheaton, specialized in mobile device management, and was acquired by Novell in 2001.

== See also ==
- Casady & Greene
- Mac gaming
