= Digital Promise =

Non-profit organization in Washington D.C., United States

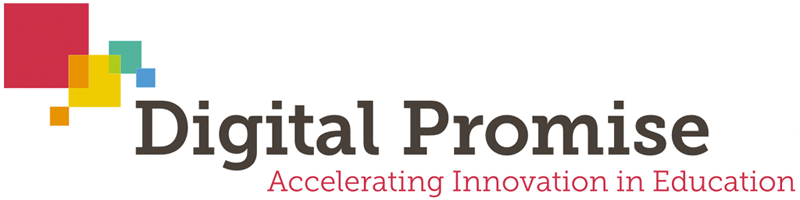
- Founder: United States Congress
- Type: 501(c)(3)
- Tax ID no.: EIN: 452708794; 465460594
- Purpose: "to expand opportunity for every learner"
- Headquarters: Washington, D.C.
- President and CEO: Jean-Claude Brizard
- Affiliations: Association of Science and Technology Centers
- Website: digitalpromise.org

Digital Promise, also known as the National Center for Research in Advanced Information and Digital Technologies, is a non-profit organization originated by the U.S. Congress as part of the 2008 re-authorization of the Higher Education Opportunity Act. Its mission is to spur innovation in education to improve the opportunity to learn for all Americans.

Digital Promise is an independent, bipartisan nonprofit, signed into law by President George W. Bush and launched in September 2011 by President Barack Obama. Initial board members were appointed by U.S. Secretary of Education Arne Duncan, whose department provided start-up funds and support with the goal of "supporting a comprehensive research and development program to harness the increasing capacity of advanced information and digital technologies to improve all levels of learning and education, formal and informal, in order to provide Americans with the knowledge and skills needed to compete in the global economy."

== History ==
More than a decade ago, the Carnegie Corporation of New York joined with the Century Foundation to launch the Digital Promise Project, an initiative to recommend policies that could harness breakthrough technologies to advance the public good. Project co-chairs, former FCC Chairman Newton N. Minow and former NBC News and PBS President Lawrence K. Grossman, published their project recommendations in a book titled A Digital Gift to the Nation.

At the request of Congress, the Digital Promise Project, in partnership with the Federation of American Scientists, developed a road map for transforming teaching and learning with technology in the digital age. This road map was the basis for Section 802 of the 2008 Higher Education Opportunity Act, authorizing the National Center for Research in Advanced Information and Digital Technologies, also known as Digital Promise.

== Digital Promise's Initiatives ==
League of Innovative Schools

In 2011, Digital Promise launched the League of Innovative Schools, a national coalition of school superintendents. The League represents a wide array of school districts—large and small, urban and rural, low-income and middle-class. Overall, it consists of 93 districts and education agencies across 33 states. By working together on shared priorities and partnering with entrepreneurs, researchers, and education leaders, League districts are pioneering innovative learning and leadership practices.

== Funding ==
Digital Promise was launched with public and private funding from sources including the U.S. Department of Education, Bill and Melinda Gates Foundation, Carnegie Corporation of New York, William and Flora Hewlett Foundation, and its range of corporate partners.
