= Delta Squadron (video game) =

1983 video game

- Publisher: Nexa Corporation
- Platform: Apple II
- Release: 1983

Delta Squadron is an Apple II video game published in 1983 by Nexa Corporation.

== Gameplay ==
Delta Squadron is a game in which the player is the Squadron Commander of the Legion Alliance who is directing small space fighter craft to destroy the Main Power Induction Inverter of the enemy Cetusites.

== Reception ==
James A. McPherson reviewed the game for Computer Gaming World, and stated that "Delta Squadron is a strategic space war game for those people who are tired of the text and colored-grid games."
