= Tank: The M1A1 Abrams Battle Tank Simulation =

1989 video game

- Original cover art
- Developer: Sphere, Inc.
- Publisher: Spectrum HoloByte
- Platform: MS-DOS
- Release: 1989
- Genre: Vehicle simulation
- Modes: Single-player, multiplayer

Tank: The M1A1 Abrams Battle Tank Simulation is a 1989 video game published by Spectrum HoloByte.

== Gameplay ==
Tank is a game in which an armor simulation includes a training scenario at Fort Knox, and scenarios in the Fulda Gap region of Central Europe, and in the Middle East between Israel, Syria, and Lebanon.

== Publication history ==
Tank was intended as the initial release for the "Electronic Battlefield System".

== Reception ==
M. Evan Brooks reviewed the game for Computer Gaming World, and stated that "Sadly, Tank has no infantry; both sides are armor heavy. This could well occur in rare instances, but the absence of infantry is sorely missed in what purports to be a simulation of the contemporary battlefield."

Paul Rigby for The Games Machine said that "Tank is an enjoyable simulation which benefits from a great deal of detailed research – the operation of the M1 Abrams is well portrayed, while the option of being able to control 16 tanks is exciting (and exhausting!)."

Steven Anzovin for Compute! said that "If you sigh wistfully for the great tank battles that may never be, Tank is definitely your game."

== See also ==
- M1 Tank Platoon
