= Wickr =

American software company

Wickr Inc.
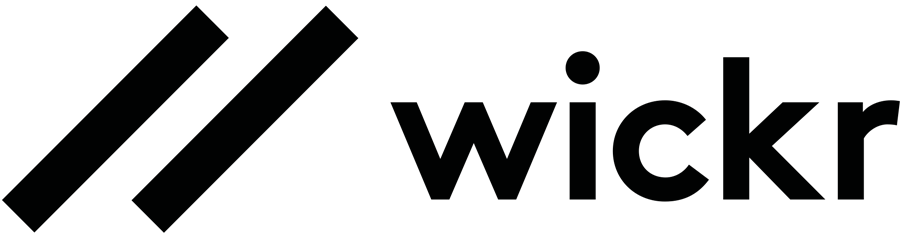
- Type: Private
- Industry: Secure instant messaging
- Founded: 2012
- Founder: Dr. Robert Statica, Kara Coppa, Christopher Howell, Nico Sell, York Sell
- Defunct: June 2021
- Fate: Acquired by Amazon Web Services
- Headquarters: New York, United States
- Key people: Joel Wallenstrom (CEO); Chris Lalonde (COO); Chris Howell (CTO)
- Website: www.wickr.com

Wickr was an American software company based in New York City that was acquired by Amazon Web Services (AWS) in mid-2021. It was known for its instant messaging applications of the same name. The Wickr messaging service allowed an organization's users (and, optionally, external guests) to exchange end-to-end encrypted and content-expiring messages.

== History ==
Wickr was founded in 2012. Nico Sell served as the company's CEO until May 2015, who then became the co-chairman of Wickr and CEO of Wickr Foundation, a newly launched nonprofit whose seed funding was provided by the company. Mark Fields, who previously led CME's Strategic Investment Group, became the company's CEO. He remained CEO until November 2016 when he was replaced by Joel Wallenstrom, co-founder of iSec Partners, becoming the company's CEO and president.

The Wickr Foundation was a nonprofit founded by Wickr founder Nico Sell that operated from 2015-2017. The foundation operated a social-impact venture fund with a global mission to advance the Private Web and transform how society uses the Internet.

AWS acquired the company on June 25, 2021. AWS stopped accepting new users to Wickr Me on December 31, 2022, and discontinued it on December 31, 2023.

== Branding ==
The Wickr name and original logo were created by the Spanish artist Joan Bofill in 2012. In 2016, Daylight Design created a new logo and visual identity for the company.

== Products ==
Wickr Me
- Developer: Wickr Inc.
- Release: June 2012
- Operating system: Windows, macOS, Ubuntu, iOS, Android
- Type: Instant Messaging
- License: Proprietary
- Website: wickr.com/me/

Wickr was known for producing secure messaging software, such as "Wickr Me". Its software received media coverage due to a security issue at a rival messaging company, Snapchat.

In 2015, the Electronic Frontier Foundation gave Wickr a score of 5 out of 7 points on their "Secure Messaging Scorecard". It received points for:

- Having communications encrypted in transit,
- Having communications encrypted with keys the provider didn't have access to (end-to-end encryption),
- Making it possible for users to independently verify their correspondent's identities,
- Having past communications secure if the keys were stolen (forward secrecy), and having completed a recent independent security audit.

The missing 2 points were due to:

- Its source code not being open to independent review (open source)
- Its security design not being well-documented.

In 2015, Wickr published a white paper outlining the encryption protocol that they use for end-to-end encryption.

In 2015, the Electronic Frontier Foundation announced that Wickr earned four out of five stars in every applicable category for its effort to protect user privacy.

In February 2017, Wickr opened one of its cryptographic protocols for public review on GitHub and published a paper, “The Wickr Messaging Protocol”, as an aid to those who wish to review the source code.

== Use by elected officials related to public disclosure requirements ==
After McKinsey & Company was contracted by the New York State Department of Corrections in 2014, top consultants and prison officers allegedly exchanged project documents over Wickr, keeping the procedure off public oversight and record requests.

Government transparency advocates noted that Maryland Governor Larry Hogan's use of Wickr destroys government records before any determination of whether they should be public can be made, under the Freedom of Information Act and state law.

== Funding ==
In March 2014, Wickr announced its Series A funding round of $9 million led by Gilman Louie of Alsop Louie Partners. The series also included investments from Juniper Networks and the Knight Foundation. Its Series B funding round of $30 million, also announced in 2014, was led by Breyer Capital, including CME Group and Wargaming.

On 12 October 2021, a Vice Motherboard article revealed that the Central Intelligence Agency (CIA) had invested $1.6 million into Wickr via the CIA's venture capital company In-Q-Tel.

Gilman Louie is the former CEO of In-Q-Tel, and other investors, including Richard Clarke and Michael Wertheimer, also have close ties to the U.S. intelligence and national security communities. It is also known that Erik Prince, the founder of the controversial private security firm Blackwater, is one of the principal investors.

== See also ==
- Comparison of cross-platform instant messaging clients
- Internet privacy
- Secure instant messaging
