= F-16 Aggressor =

1998 combat flight simulator video game

- Developer: General Simulations Incorporated
- Publisher: Bethesda Softworks
- Platform: Microsoft Windows
- Release: EU: December 29, 1998; NA: May 1999
- Genre: Combat flight simulator
- Modes: Single-player, multiplayer

F-16 Aggressor is a video game developed by General Simulations Incorporated and published by Bethesda Softworks in 1998-1999.

== Gameplay ==
F-16 Aggressor is a game in which a flight simulation features a fly-by-wire system and models the F-16's flight systems, weapons, and g-forces. Missions and instant-action scenarios for modern combat in this game often involve long-range missile engagements rather than traditional dogfighting. Since a single missile can destroy most targets — including the player's aircraft — mastering evasive techniques is crucial.

== Development ==
The game was announced in May 1998 by Virgin Interactive. In January 1999, Bethesda Softworks acquired the US publishing rights to the game. The title was developed by General Simulations Incorporated, a company founded initially as Virtek International in 1993.

== Reception ==
Reception

Aggregate score
Aggregator	Score
GameRankings	66%

Review scores
Publication	Score
Computer Gaming World	3/5
GamePro	3.5/5
GameSpot	6.5/10
GameStar	34%
IGN	7.3/10
Next Generation	3/5
PC Gamer (US)	56%
PC Games (DE)	70%

The game received average reviews according to the review aggregation website GameRankings. Adam Pavlacka of NextGen said, "F-16 Aggressor deserves high praise as a pure simulator. It accurately depicts the F-16, and it runs on an average system. If you want to train as a pilot, it's terrific. If you're looking for an enjoyable combat experience, however, look elsewhere."
