= Super Tetris =

1991 video game

- Developer: Spectrum HoloByte
- Publisher: Spectrum HoloByte
- Composers: Ed Bogas, Paul Mogg
- Series: Tetris
- Platforms: MS-DOS, Mac OS, Amiga
- Release: 1991
- Genre: Puzzle
- Modes: Single-player, multiplayer

Super Tetris is a 1991 puzzle video game published by Spectrum HoloByte.

== Gameplay ==
Super Tetris is a game in which two players can play with each other in competitive, cooperative or head-to-head modes. Super Tetris adds bombs, which replace regular squares in pieces and explode when the row is filled and removed, to standard Tetris gameplay.

== Reception ==
Reception

Review scores
Publication	Score
Amiga Action	78%
Amiga Computing	40%
Amiga Format	68%
Amiga Power	29%
Computer and Video Games	89

Michael S. Lasky reviewed the game for Computer Gaming World, and stated that "Tetris has made it to number five and is aptly named, because this Tetris is Super indeed."

Frank O'Connor for Computer and Video Games complimented the addition of bombs, but complained that the game was too similar to the original.

Steve White for Amiga Action lamented that the original Tetris "has already had its best days", but recommended Super Tetris for people who are not yet bored of the concept."

Daniel Whitehead for Amiga Computing considered the game to have an "extremely dubious value for money" and suggested not to bother getting this one for anyone who had Tetris already.

Stuart Campbell for Amiga Power complained about boredom with Tetris and "couldn't be bothered with Super Tetris after the first 20 minutes" and said that someone would "just have to be completely Tetris-loopy-nuts to spend £30 on it".

Tony Dillon for CU Amiga complimented the inclusion of the Russian music and the link-up head-to-head option for two players, but concluded that it is an "excellent game, but not really removed enough from the original idea to merit buying".

Gary Whitta for The One was annoyed by some of the sloppiness of the game, but still considered it "the best official version of the game" even though he doubted many people would want to pay the asking price.

Ed Ricketts for Amiga Format called it "Quite Good" rather than Super, and gave a "thumbs up to Spectrum Holobyte for turning what was really an average puzzle game into something with a little more longevity".
