= Falcon (series) =

Video game series

The Falcon line of computer games is a series of simulations of the F-16 Fighting Falcon combat aircraft. The games, mostly published by Spectrum HoloByte, were noted for their high level of realism unseen in contemporary simulation games.

On May 4, 2023, MicroProse announced it had re-acquired the copyright to the Falcon series.

== Series ==
=== F-16 Fighting Falcon ===
F-16 Fighting Falcon was developed by Nexa Corporation (later merged to Spectrum Holobyte) and published by ASCII Corporation in 1984 for the MSX. Designed by Gilman Louie and Les Watts, it used bitmapped 3D MiG-21s as adversaries, several years before Origin's Wing Commander used a similar graphics engine. Sega's Yuji Naka ported the game to the Master System.

=== Falcon ===
Falcon is the first official entry in the series. Originally developed by Sphere for Macintosh and MS-DOS in 1987 and ported to several platforms between 1988 and 1992, the game earned commercial success and critical acclaim.

=== Falcon A.T. ===
Falcon A.T. (MS-DOS 1988), also known as Falcon 2, was one of the first flight sims to use EGA graphics as well as one of the earliest commercially released games to require a 286 or better PC. In comparison to the older game, this version allows external viewing of the player aircraft, enables a "head-to-head" multiplayer mode, and includes the MiG-29 as an adversary.

ACE wrote: "If you really want the terror, exhiliration and sheer everything-happens-at-once confusion of combat flying, this game delivers. The graphics help too, of course!" Dragon awarded the game and 4 out of 5 stars in their February 1989 issue. Computer Gaming World gave the game 3 stars out of 5 in their June 1992 issue.

=== Falcon 3.0 ===
Falcon 3.0 was published in 1991 for MS-DOS as the third official main entry in the series.

==== Falcon 3.0 based games ====
Falcon 3.0 was sold as being the first of a series of inter-linked military simulations that Spectrum Holobyte collectively called the "Electronic Battlefield". Two games released in this range were the 1993 flight simulators for the F/A-18 (Falcon 3.0: Hornet: Naval Strike Fighter) and the MiG-29 (MiG-29: Deadly Adversary of Falcon 3.0) that could be played as stand-alone games or integrated into "Electronic Battlefield" network games.

Further games in the range were expected - rumours abounded of a simulator for the AH-64 Apache helicopter gunship, and even one or more tank simulators. The only one the company actually admitted to working on was a flight simulator of the A-10 Thunderbolt, but was never released.

Computer Gaming World in November 1993 criticized MiG-29's new redout/blackout model as unrealistic, and lack of fixes to existing bugs, but approved of the improved modem play and its "new set of challenges designed to broaden Falcon's appeal". In a January 1994 survey of wargames the magazine gave the title four stars out of five, stating that the game was "mandatory" for serious players but not for "the casual weekend flyer".

Computer Gaming World in April 1994 approved of Hornet's "Excellent enemy AI" and "intense" air-to-ground combat. While citing "some irritating bugs", the magazine concluded that as "basically Falcon 3 with new scenarios and a different flight model", it "will make a very welcome addition to the hard-core pilot's collection".

=== Falcon 4.0 and Falcon 4.0: Allied Force ===
Falcon 4.0 was published in 1998 for Windows as the fourth official main entry in the series. The Falcon 4.0 series is one of the longest running game series in PC history to have used the same code base. The history of Falcon 4.0 spans over two decades due to derivatives like Falcon 4.0: Allied Force, the BMS derivative from 2012, and other variants.

== Reception ==
The Falcon series sold 700,000 copies by January 1995; Falcon 3.0 alone accounted for 400,000 sales by March 1995. Sales of the series had surpassed 900,000 copies by 2005.
