= Footlight (typeface) =

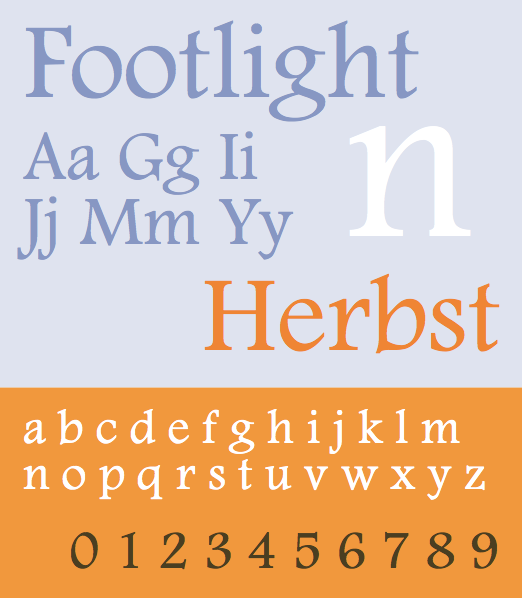
- Category: Serif
- Designer(s): Ong Chong Wah
- Foundry: Monotype Corporation
- Date released: 1986

Footlight is a serif typeface designed by Malaysian type designer Ong Chong Wah in 1986 for the Monotype Corporation. Footlight is an irregular design. It is sold in weights from light to extra-bold with matching italics. It was originally designed as an italic font, a roman version was later made.

== Footlight MT ==
A version of Footlight's light style called "Footlight MT" (without italic) has been bundled with some Microsoft software.

=== Distribution ===
It has been distributed in the following products:

- Access 97 SR2
- Office 2000 Premium
- Office 2007
- Office 2007 Professional Edition
- Office 2010
- Office 4.3 Professional
- Office 97 Small Business Edition SR2
- Office 97 SR1a
- Office Professional Edition 2003
- PhotoDraw 2000
- Picture It! 2000
- Picture It! 2002
- Picture It! 98
- Publisher 2000
- Publisher 2007
- Publisher 97
- Publisher 98
- Windows Small Business Server 2003

=== Unicode ===
Footlight MT has support for the following Unicode blocks:

- Basic Latin
- Latin-1 Supplement
