= Faces...tris III =

1990 video game

Faces
- Developer: Spectrum HoloByte
- Composer: Ed Bogas
- Series: Tetris
- Platforms: Macintosh, Amiga, MS-DOS
- Release: 1990
- Genre: Puzzle

Faces...tris III is a puzzle video game developed by Spectrum HoloByte in 1990 for the Macintosh, Amiga and MS-DOS.

== Gameplay ==
Faces is the fourth game in a series after Tetris, Hatris and Welltris. In Faces, two horizontal slices depicting parts of the faces of people fall side by side from the top of the screen, while the player moves the slices left and right to position them and make faces before they pile up at the bottom of the screen, and the game ends if the pieces stack up to the top of the screen.

== Development ==
Alexey Pazhitnov worked on the game with Vladimir Pokhilko. It was the last Tetris-style game Pazhitnov directly created.

Pazhitnov later spoke of the game saying "Personally, I didn't like it very much. We forced it on Spectrum HoloByte and it was interesting because the pieces would form a human face. But somehow the effect of your mistakes was an ugly image on screen."

== Reception ==
The game was reviewed in 1991 in Dragon #168 by Gregg Williams in "The Role of Computers" column. The reviewer gave the game 3 out of 5 stars.
