= Knight Moves =

Knight Moves may refer to:

- Knight Moves (film), a 1992 American thriller film
- Knight Moves (video game), a puzzle video game
- Knight Moves (novel), a novel by Walter Jon Williams
- "Knight Moves" (Knight Rider), a 1983 television episode
- "Knight Moves", a song by Suzanne Vega from her 1985 album Suzanne Vega
- The movement of a knight in chess, two squares in one direction and one square orthogonally

== See also ==
- Night Moves (disambiguation)
- Knight Move
