= Microsoft Picture It! =

Photo editing application

- Developer: Microsoft
- Stable release: 9 (9.0.912.0) [±]
- Operating system: Microsoft Windows
- Type: Graphics software
- License: Proprietary

Microsoft Picture It! is a discontinued photo editing application created by Microsoft. Microsoft acquired the intellectual property rights and full U.S. trade registration from RomTech, later renamed eGames, and released Version 1.0 of the application in September 1996. Borrowing from the wizard user interface concepts of Microsoft Publisher, Picture It! was geared to make digital imaging easy for consumers. It was the first consumer imaging program to enable sprite creation, leveraging alpha masking (a concept published by Alvy Ray Smith, founder of Pixar, in 1978) while running on an 8 MB RAM Pentium computer. Microsoft purchased Altamira Software, the company owned by Alvy Ray Smith, in 1994 and made Smith a Microsoft employee.

The Picture It! file format used the extension .MIX (Microsoft Image Extension). The .MIX extension was also used by Microsoft PhotoDraw although its format was incompatible with Picture It!.

In 2001, Microsoft merged its Home Publishing product with Picture It! to create Picture It! Publishing. In 2003, Picture It! was significantly changed, expanded with more advanced editing features and rebranded as Microsoft Digital Image with the home publishing features removed and a focus exclusively on photo editing. Digital Image was also eventually discontinued in 2006 after the release of Windows Vista.

Picture It! shipped in a number of editions and versions:

== Versions ==
- Picture It! 1.0 (1996)
- Picture It! 2.0 and Picture It! 2.0 Express (part of Microsoft Plus! 98) (1997)
- Picture It! 99 (3.0) (1998) – 2 disc set
- Picture It! 2000 (4.0) (1999) – 2 disc set
- Picture It! 2001 (5.0) – the last version to support Windows 95. (2000) – 7 disc set for Picture It! Publishing Platinum 2001 (with the merger of Picture It! and Microsoft Home Publishing)
- Picture It! 2002 (6.0) (2001) – 5 disc set for Publishing Platinum 2002
- Picture It! 7.0 and Digital Image Pro 7.0 (2003) – 2 disc set
- Picture It! Premium 9, Digital Image Pro 9 and Digital Image Suite 9 (2004) – 2 disc set
- Picture It! Premium 10, Digital Image Pro 10 and Digital Image Suite 10 (2005) – 2 disc set
- Digital Image 2006 and Digital Image 2006 Anniversary Edition (2006) – 2 disc set

== Editions ==
- Picture It! Express – Scaled down edition of Picture It!
- Picture It! Photo and Photo Premium – Picture It! editions with only photo editing features
- Picture It! Publishing (Gold, Silver and Platinum editions) – Picture It! editions with photo editing as well as home publishing features
- Picture It! Print Studio and, Photo & Print Studio (UK editions of Picture It! Publishing)
- Picture It! Library – An image organizing application since version 9 Suite edition, which later became Digital Image Library and eventually some features went into Windows Live Photo Gallery
- Microsoft Greetings Workshop, later Microsoft Greetings (a scaled-down Picture It!-based application with only greeting card templates) – single CD
