= Microsoft Plus! =

Software

- Developer: Microsoft
- Operating system: Microsoft Windows
- Successor: Windows Ultimate Extras
- Type: Operating system enhancement package
- License: Closed source

Microsoft Plus! is a discontinued commercial operating system enhancement product by Microsoft. The last edition is the Plus! SuperPack, which includes an assortment of screensavers, themes, and games, as well as multimedia applications. The Microsoft Plus! product was first announced on January 31, 1994, under the internal codename "Frosting". The first edition was an enhancement for Windows 95, Microsoft Plus! for Windows 95.

The enhancements that make up Microsoft Plus! were generally developed by Microsoft itself. The Plus! packs also included games and content from third-party companies; for example, in Plus! for Windows XP, the HyperBowl game developed by HyperEntertainment Inc. was included. Plus! features that enhance the base operating system or provide utility are generally included free of charge in the next release of Windows.

Microsoft Plus! was discontinued and replaced by Windows Ultimate Extras in Windows Vista. Windows Ultimate Extras would later be completely removed in Windows 7.

== Versions ==
=== Microsoft Plus! for Windows 95 ===
Windows 95 with Microsoft Plus boot screen

This was the first version of Plus! and had an initial cost of US$49.99 (equivalent to $106 in 2025). It included Space Cadet Pinball, the Internet Jumpstart Kit (which was the introduction of Internet Explorer 1.0), DriveSpace 3 and Compression Agent disk compression utilities, the initial release of theme support along with a set of 12 themes, dial-up networking server, dial-up scripting tool, and the graphical improvements such as anti-aliased screen fonts, full-window drag, the ability to stretch or shrink the wallpaper to fit the screen and high color icons.

Task Scheduler as it is present in later Windows versions was included as System Agent. A utility to notify the user of low disk space (DiskAlm.exe) also ran as part of System Agent. Plus! for Windows 95 was initially marketed for adding features for "high-performance computers", the minimum system requirements were an 80386 CPU with 8 megabytes of RAM. Later releases of Windows 95 (OSR2 and onwards) included DriveSpace 3 and Internet Explorer 3.0. Windows 98 included all of the enhancements included in Plus! for Windows 95. Space Cadet Pinball was not installed by default, but included on the Windows 98 CD. Although Windows NT 4.0 is not intended to support desktop themes, each desktop theme from this pack (except the More Windows theme and the Windows 95 256-color theme) along with the Space theme from the Microsoft Plus! for Kids pack (albeit with a different startup sound) and three additional exclusive desktop themes is installable on this operating system via the Windows NT 4.0 Resource Kit.

The screen-saver and wallpaper files include images from the Codex Leicester, which Microsoft co-founder, then CEO Bill Gates bought in 1994.

Microsoft Plus! for Windows 95 shipped with the following Desktop Themes:

- Dangerous Creatures (256 color)
- Inside Your Computer (high color)
- Leonardo da Vinci (256 color)
- More Windows (high color)
- Mystery (high color)
- Nature (high color)
- Science (256 color)
- The 60's USA (256 color)
- The Golden Era (high color)
- Sports (256 color)
- Travel (high color)
- Windows 95 (256 color)

All of them were included in Windows 98 and Me, except that in Windows 98, the "Windows 95" and "More Windows" themes were modified to use Windows 98's version of The Microsoft Sound, as well as to change instances of "Windows 95" to "Windows 98", and in Windows Me, the two themes are combined into a new theme entitled "Windows Millennium", with a unique background.

=== Microsoft Plus! for Kids ===
This version was released in 1997 and aimed at children of ages 3 to 12. It includes three new applications: Talk It!, a text-to-speech program that says what users type using various voices; Play It!, an electronic keyboard with music and sound effects; and Paint It!, a version of Paint oriented for kids. It also contained a "picture picker" along with clipart, fonts, 10 new desktop themes, and Protect It!, a parental controls program. Plus! for Kids was the only Plus! release from the Microsoft Home and Entertainment division rather than the Windows Operating System development group. Four desktop themes from this collection - Baseball, Jungle, Space and Underwater – were included in Windows 98 and Windows Me; the Underwater theme, however, was modified to have its sounds play in different events.

There is also a demo version for Microsoft Plus! for Kids; however, it only contains the readme for the program and the Underwater theme. The pack can also be installed on Windows NT 4.0 if the user is granted administrative privileges, according to the Readme document included with the pack, although Protect It! and the desktop themes cannot be installed, mainly due to design differences between Windows 95 and NT 4.0.

Desktop Themes in Microsoft Plus! for Kids
Theme Name	Notes
Baseball (256 color)	Later included in Windows 98/Me
Bugs (256 color)
Horses (256 color)
Jungle (256 color)	Later included in Windows 98/Me
Messy Room (256 color)
RE-man (high color)
Snowboarding (256 color)
Space (256 color)	Later included in Windows 98/Me
Treehouse (256 color)
Underwater (256 color)	Later included in Windows 98/Me

=== Microsoft Plus! 98 ===
As the sequel to the original suite of enhancements to Windows, Plus! 98 included eighteen new desktop themes (some of which were based on popular comics such as FoxTrot and Garfield), along with new programs and tools for Windows 98. An "organic art" 3D screensaver rendered unique infinite 3D visual shapes. A Start Menu cleanup utility was added to Windows 98's Maintenance Wizard. A Cybermedia Non-Critical File Cleaner utility was integrated into Disk Cleanup. ZIP file integration with Windows Explorer was first introduced with this version under the name of "compressed folders". New games, such as Microsoft Golf 1998 Lite, Lose Your Marbles and the now popular Spider Solitaire were also part of Plus! 98. A Deluxe CD Player with CDDB support and a basic "express" version of Picture It! were also included. Finally, Plus! 98 came with McAfee VirusScan 3.0, along with free updates for six months.

Some Plus! 98 features such as compressed folders and the Spider Solitaire game were included in Windows Me and later Windows versions. The Deluxe CD Player was included with Windows 2000. Windows Me does not include all of the Plus! 98 features, and Plus! 98 Setup is blocked by Windows Me as it is incompatible. It can be installed on Windows Me by copying the setup files to the local hard disk and renaming Setup.exe before running it.

Desktop Themes included in Windows 98 and Windows Me
Theme Name	Notes
Baseball (256 color)	Previously included in Plus! for Kids
Dangerous Creatures (256 color)	Previously included in Plus! for Windows 95
Inside Your Computer (high color)	Previously included in Plus! for Windows 95
Jungle (256 color)	Previously included in Plus! for Kids
Leonardo da Vinci (256 color)	Previously included in Plus! for Windows 95
More Windows (high color)	Windows 98 only; previously included in Plus! for Windows 95, albeit with Windows 95's version of The Microsoft Sound and the background reading "Windows 95"
Mystery (high color)	Previously included in Plus! for Windows 95
Nature (high color)	Previously included in Plus! for Windows 95
Science (256 color)	Previously included in Plus! for Windows 95
Space (256 color)	Previously included in Plus! for Kids
The 60's USA (256 color)	Previously included in Plus! for Windows 95
The Golden Era (high color)	Previously included in Plus! for Windows 95
Sports (256 color)	Previously included in Plus! for Windows 95
Travel (high color)	Previously included in Plus! for Windows 95
Underwater (high color)	Previously included in Plus! for Kids
Windows 98 (256 color)	Windows 98 only; previously included in Plus! for Windows 95 under the name "Windows 95"
Windows Millennium (high color)	Windows Me only; rebranded version of the "More Windows" theme with updated Windows Me-specific wallpaper and The Microsoft Sound

Desktop Themes in Microsoft Plus! 98
Theme Name
Architecture
Cathy
Cityscape
Corbis Photography (high color)
Doonesbury
Falling Leaves (high color)
Farm
Fashion (high color)
FoxTrot
Garfield
Geometry (high color)
Horror Channel (high color)
Jazz
Peanuts
PhotoDisc (high color)
Rock-n-Roll (high color)
Science Fiction (high color)
Windows 98 (high color)
World Traveler (high color)

It is possible to use the Plus! for Windows 95, Plus! for Kids, and Plus! 98 desktop themes on Windows 2000 and Windows XP, by copying PLUS!.DLL, THEMES.EXE, and Themes folder from the %ProgramFiles%\Plus! directory from an existing Windows 98/Me computer to a Windows 2000/XP computer. It is recommended to run the Desktop Themes control panel (THEMES.EXE) in Windows 98/Me compatibility mode, to avoid crashes.

The screensaver .scr/.dll files are stored in %WINDIR%\system on Windows 98/Me, and can be copied over to %WINDIR%\system32 directory on Windows 2000/XP.

=== Microsoft Plus! Game Pack: Cards & Puzzles ===
This Plus! pack was released at the time of Windows Millennium Edition; however, it could also be installed on Windows 95-98, NT 4.0 and 2000. It included the Microsoft Entertainment Pack: The Puzzle Collection - a collection of 10 arcade games and Microsoft Bicycle Card Collection, another set of 12 card games (Hearts, Spades, Cribbage, Pinochle, Crazy 8's, Oh Hell!, Go Fish, Old Maid, Euchre, Gin Rummy, Schafkopf and Skat). A trial version of Microsoft Pandora's Box was also included.

=== Microsoft Plus! for Windows XP ===
Package containing Windows XP version of Microsoft Plus!

Marketed as "The Ultimate Companion for Windows XP", Microsoft Plus! for Windows XP was launched alongside the Windows XP operating system on October 25, 2001. This version of Plus! was created to show off the enhanced capabilities that Windows XP presented with its updated Windows Media Player and DirectX 3D core technologies. Continuing the feature categories of the previous Plus! products, the product features were desktop themes, screen savers, games, and utilities.

Plus! for Windows XP includes:

- Plus! Themes (Aquarium, Nature, da Vinci and Space)
- Plus! Screen Savers (Aquarium, Nature, da Vinci, Space, Robot Circus, Sand Pendulum, Mercury Pool and Plus! My Pictures Premium screensaver)
- Plus! Voice Command for Windows Media Player
- Plus! Personal DJ
- Plus! MP3 Converter
- Plus! CD Label Maker
- Plus! Speaker Enhancement
- Plus! 3D Visualizations for Windows Media Player (Oddworld: Munch's Oddysee, Maxx's Kingdom and Plus! Undersea Wonders)
- Plus! Skins for Windows Media Player (Aquarium, Nature, da Vinci and Space)
- Plus! Hyperbowl
- Plus! Russian Square
- Plus! Labyrinth

=== Microsoft Plus! Digital Media Edition ===
Marketed as "The Ultimate Photo, Music, and Movie Enhancement Pack for Windows XP", Microsoft launched Plus! Digital Media Edition along with Windows XP Media Center Edition. Plus! Digital Media Edition signified the first time Microsoft had released a second Plus! product based on the same base operating system. Microsoft Plus! Digital Media Edition was also the first Microsoft product to be made available for sale to consumers via e-commerce as full product download through online retailers.

Released on January 7, 2003, Plus! Digital Media Edition built upon two newly enhanced Windows XP core components: Windows Media Player and Windows Movie Maker 2. This product version focused more on utility features for photos, music and movies rather than including the more traditional Plus! features like themes, screen savers, and games.

Plus! Digital Media Edition includes:

- Plus! Photo Story 2
- Plus! Party Mode
- Plus! Analog Recorder
- Plus! CD Label Maker
- Plus! Dancer
- Plus! Audio Converter
- Plus! Effects and Transitions for Windows Movie Maker 2
- Plus! Alarm Clock
- Plus! Sleep Timer
- Plus! Skins for Windows Media Player 9 Series (Bionic Dot, Hard Boiled, HueShifter, Mecha, Professional, Pulsar and Slimline)
- Plus! Sync & Go for Pocket PC

Microsoft Plus! Digital Media Edition is the only version of Microsoft Plus! to require activation.

Windows XP Media Center Edition 2005 includes some of the themes and screensavers from Microsoft Plus! for Windows XP, as it retains the Aquarium, Da Vinci, Nature and Space themes. It also includes some applications from Microsoft Plus! Digital Media Edition, namely, Audio Converter, CD Label Maker, Dancer and Party Mode and the My Pictures Premium screensaver. A Windows Media Player skin called Darkling, developed by The Skins Factory is included, the skin is exclusive to Microsoft Plus! Digital Media Edition.

=== Microsoft Plus! SuperPack for Windows XP ===
On October 19, 2004, Microsoft replaced its two separate Plus! products for Windows XP with a single combined version called the Microsoft Plus! SuperPack for Windows XP. There were no new features or functionality added nor are the two separate products integrated. On Windows XP Media Center Edition the Pack was not needed as it had included the Plus Pack features. The Plus! series has been discontinued, as some of its features have been integrated into Windows Vista and later Windows versions.

== Reception ==
AllGame gave Microsoft Plus! for Windows XP a rating of 2.5 out of 5 and wrote: "Doesn't live up to its predecessors. It's nice to have, and it's not as if you'll want to uninstall it once it's already bought-and-paid-for, but Microsoft Plus! for XP probably isn't worth the fuss unless you're a really big Windows fan."

== See also ==
- Windows Ultimate Extras
- Microsoft Photo Story
- Microsoft Picture It!
- Microsoft Windows Media Player
- Microsoft Windows Movie Maker
