= Alexey Pajitnov =

Russian-American computer engineer (born 1955)

- Алексей Пажитнов
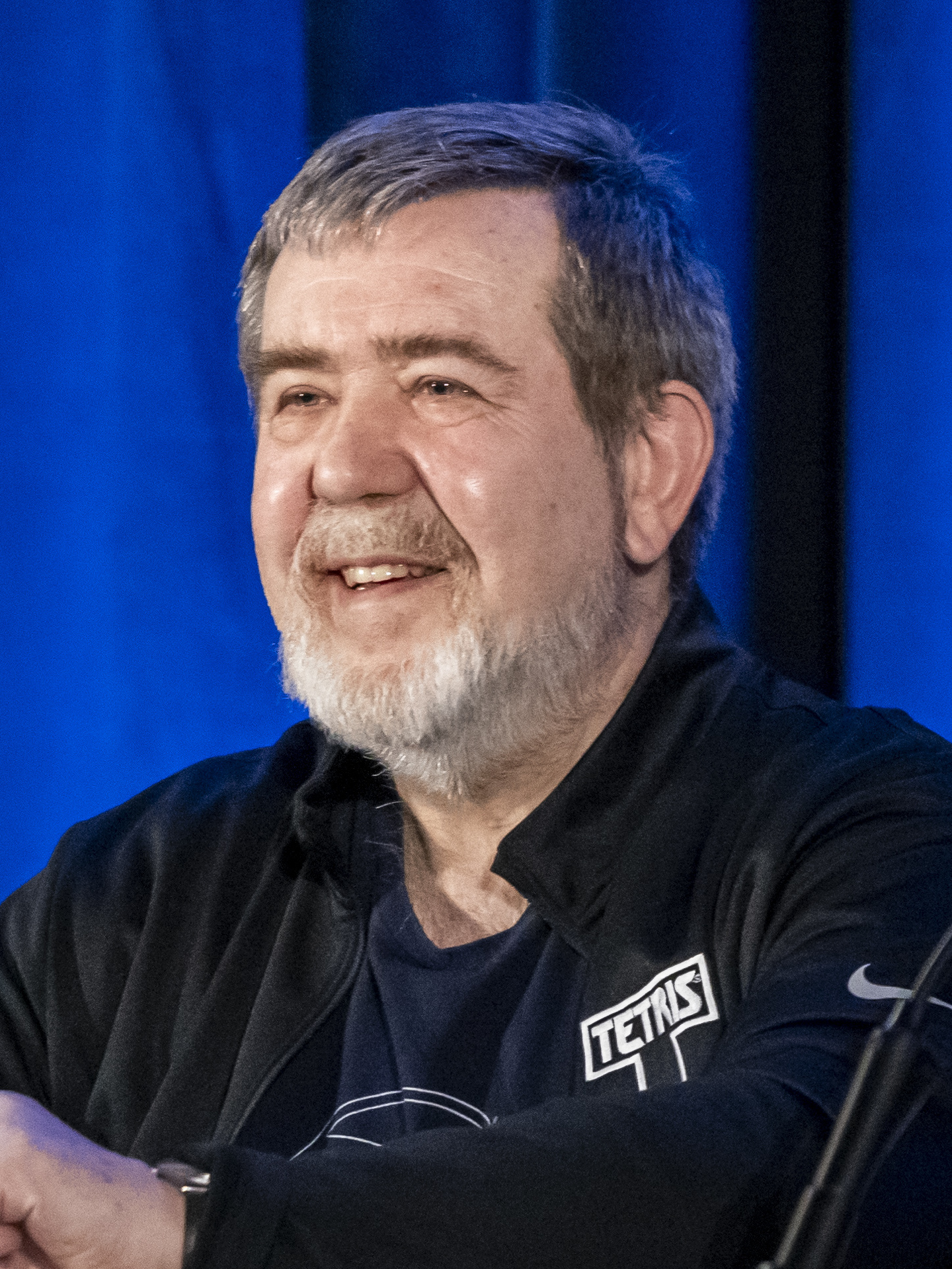
- Pajitnov in 2024
- Born: April 16, 1955 (age 71); Moscow, Soviet Union
- Citizenship: Soviet Union (until 1991); Russia; United States
- Education: Moscow State University
- Occupations: Computer engineer; video game designer
- Employer(s): Dorodnitsyn Computing Centre; The Tetris Company; Microsoft
- Known for: Creating Tetris
- Awards: First Penguin Award – Game Developers Choice Awards (2006); LARA – Der Deutsche Games Award (2009)

Alexey Leonidovich Pajitnov (Note: In this name that follows East Slavic naming customs, the patronymic is Leonidovich and the family name is Pajitnov.) (Note: Russian: Алексей Леонидович Пажитнов, romanized: Aleksey Leonidovich Pazhitnov, IPA: [ɐlʲɪkˈsʲej lʲɪɐˈnʲidəvʲɪtɕ ˈpaʐɨtnəf]) (born April 17, 1955) is a Russian and American computer engineer and video game designer. He is best known for creating, designing, and developing Tetris in 1985 while working at the Dorodnitsyn Computing Centre under the Academy of Sciences of the Soviet Union (now the Russian Academy of Sciences).

Following the dissolution of the Soviet Union in 1991, Pajitnov moved to the United States and became a U.S. citizen. In 1996, he founded The Tetris Company alongside Dutch video game designer Henk Rogers. Despite the game's high popularity, Pajitnov did not receive royalties from Tetris prior to this time.

== Early life ==
Pajitnov was born on April 16, 1955, in Moscow, to Russian parents who were both writers. His father was an art critic and his mother was a journalist who wrote for both newspapers and a film magazine. It was through his parents that Pajitnov gained exposure to the arts, eventually developing a passion for cinema. He accompanied his mother to many film screenings, including the Moscow Film Festival. Pajitnov was also mathematically inclined, enjoying puzzles and problem solving.

In 1967, when he was 11 years old, Pajitnov's parents divorced. For several years, he lived with his mother in a one-bedroom apartment owned by the state. The two were eventually able to move into a private apartment at 49 Gertsen Street, when Pajitnov was 17. He later went on to study applied mathematics at the Moscow State University.

== Career ==
In 1977, Pajitnov worked as a summer intern at the Soviet Academy of Sciences. Once he graduated in 1979, he accepted a job there working on speech recognition at the academy's Dorodnitsyn Computing Centre. When the Computing Centre received new equipment, its researchers would write a small program for it in order to test its computing capabilities. According to Pajitnov, this "became [his] excuse for making games". Computer games were fascinating to him because they offered a way to bridge the gap between logic and emotion, and Pajitnov held interests in both mathematics and puzzles, as well as the psychology of computing.

Searching for inspiration, Pajitnov recalled his childhood memories of playing pentominoes, a game in which the user creates pictures using its shapes. Remembering the difficulty he had in putting the pieces back into their box, Pajitnov felt inspired to create a game based on that concept. Using an Electronika 60 in the Computing Centre, he began working on what would become the first version of Tetris. Building the first prototype in two weeks, Pajitnov spent longer playtesting and adding to the game, completing it on June 6, 1985. This primitive version did not have levels or a scoring system, but Pajitnov knew he had a potentially great game, since he could not stop playing it at work.

The game attracted the interest of coworkers like fellow programmer Dmitri Pevlovsky, who helped Pajitnov connect with Vadim Gerasimov, a 16-year-old intern at the Soviet Academy. Pajitnov wanted to make a color version of Tetris for the IBM Personal Computer, and enlisted the intern to help. Gerasimov created the PC version in less than three weeks, and with contributions from Pevlovsky, spent an additional month adding new features like scorekeeping and sound effects. The game, first available in the Soviet Union, received international releases through Mirrorsoft and Spectrum Holobyte in 1988.

Pajitnov created a sequel to Tetris, entitled Welltris, which has the same principle, but in a three-dimensional environment where the player sees the playing area from above.

Tetris was licensed and managed by Soviet company ELORG, which had a monopoly on the import and export of computer hardware and software in the Soviet Union, and advertised with the slogan "From Russia with Love" (on NES: "From Russia with Fun!"). Because he was employed by the Soviet Academy of Sciences, Pajitnov did not receive royalties.

Pajitnov, together with Vladimir Pokhilko, moved to the United States following the collapse of the Soviet Union in 1991, and in 1996 founded The Tetris Company with Henk Rogers, which, in combination with the rights reverting to him in 1995 or 1996, finally allowed him to collect royalties from his game. He helped design the puzzles in the Super NES versions of Yoshi's Cookie and designed the game Pandora's Box, which incorporates more traditional jigsaw-style puzzles. Pajitnov and Pokhilko founded the 3D software technology company AnimaTek, which developed the game / screensaver El-Fish.

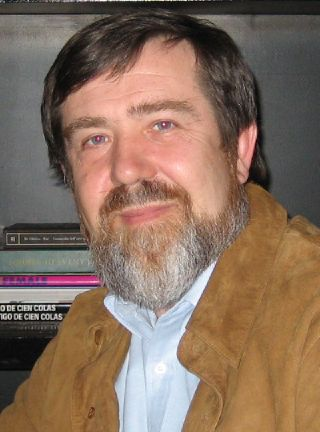
Pajitnov in 2008

He was employed by Microsoft from October 1996 until 2005. While there, he worked on the Microsoft Entertainment Pack: The Puzzle Collection, MSN Mind Aerobics and MSN Games groups. Pajitnov's new, enhanced version of Hexic, Hexic HD, was included with every new Xbox 360 Premium package.

In August 2005, WildSnake Software announced that Pajitnov would be collaborating with them to release a new line of puzzle games.

== Personal life ==
Pajitnov moved to the United States in 1991, was naturalized as a U.S. citizen and now lives in Clyde Hill, Washington. He and his wife, Nina, have two sons.

=== Political views ===
==== Russo-Ukrainian War ====
After the Russian invasion of Ukraine in 2022, Pajitnov issued a statement condemning the war and stating that he was "sure that Putin and his hateful regime will fall down and the normal peaceful way of living will be restored in Ukraine and, hopefully, in Russia".

==== Donald Trump ====
In September 2026, the Trump administration launched an online arcade on the White House website featuring games promoting its policies, including Build the Wall, a near-exact clone of Tetris in which players stack blocks to build a border wall. The Tetris Company, which Pajitnov co-owns with Henk Rogers, distanced itself from the game, stating that it believed in "bringing people together, not dividing them" and that it took copyright infringement "very seriously". Build the Wall was subsequently removed from the White House site.

== Games ==
Title	Year	Platforms	Roles
Tetris	1985	Electronika 60, IBM PC	Concept, with Vadim Gerasimov & Dmitry Pavlovsky
Muddle	1989	Electronika 60, IBM PC	Design
Welltris	1989	Amiga, Atari ST, C64, MS-DOS, Mac, ZX Spectrum	Design, with Andrei Snegov
Faces	1990	Amiga, MS-DOS, Mac	Concept, with Vladimir Pokhilko
Hatris	1990	TurboGrafx-16, arcade, Game Boy, NES	Concept
Knight Move	1990	Famicom Disk System	Design
Wordtris	1991	MS-DOS, Game Boy, Mac, SNES,	Design
Yoshi's Cookie	1992	NES, Game Boy, SNES	Puzzle design
El-Fish	1993	MS-DOS	Concept, with Vladimir Pokhilko
Knight Moves	1995	Windows	Idealist
Ice & Fire	1995	Windows, Mac	Concept, with Vladimir Pokhilko
Tetrisphere	1997	Nintendo 64	Contributor
Microsoft Entertainment Pack: The Puzzle Collection	1997	Windows, Game Boy Color	Design
Microsoft Pandora's Box	1999	Windows	Design
Microsoft A.I. Puzzler	2001	Windows	Design
Hexic	2003	Windows	Concept and design
Hexic HD	2005	Xbox 360	Concept and design
Dwice	2006	Windows	Design
Hexic 2	2007	Xbox 360	Design
Marbly	2013	iOS	Concept and design

== Awards and recognition ==
In 1996, GameSpot named him as the fourth most influential computer game developer of all time. In March 2007, he received the Game Developers Choice Awards First Penguin Award. The award was given for pioneering the casual games market.

In June 2009, he received the honorary award at the LARA - Der Deutsche Games Award in Cologne, Germany. In 2012, IGN included Pajitnov on their list of 5 Memorable Video Game Industry One-Hit Wonders, calling him "the ultimate video game one-hit wonder." In 2015, Pajitnov won the Bizkaia Award at the Fun & Serious Game Festival.

Pajitnov was portrayed by Russian actor Nikita Yefremov in the 2023 movie Tetris, a dramatised retelling of the licensing bidding war for Tetris in the late 1980s.

== See also ==
- BreakThru!, video game endorsed by Pajitnov
- ClockWerx, video game endorsed by Pajitnov
