= Photo-story =

Photo-story may refer to:

- Photo Story, a Windows XP software program by Microsoft, intended for making a slideshow
- Photo-essay, a distinctive form of photojournalism seen in magazines and some newspapers
- Photo comics, also known as fumetti, a form of sequential storytelling that uses photographs instead of illustration
