= Hyperbowl Plus! Edition =

2001 video game

HyperBowl Plus! Edition
- Developer: HyperEntertainment
- Publisher: Microsoft
- Platform: Microsoft Windows
- Release: 2001
- Genre: Sports
- Modes: Single-player, multiplayer

HyperBowl Plus! Edition is a 3D bowling-style video game made in 2001 by HyperEntertainment. It was published by Microsoft, and can only be accessed by use of a Microsoft Plus! CD-ROM.

== Gameplay ==
HyperBowl is similar to a basic game of ten-pin bowling: the goal is to knock down as many of the ten pins as possible within thirty seconds. Unlike in normal bowling, the lane also contains obstacles, like moving vehicles in the Tokyo and San Francisco lanes and trees in the Yosemite lane. The player can use a mouse or trackball to guide the ball while it's moving in order to avoid obstacles and aim for the pins. A clock at the upper-right corner of the lane window displays the time left to knock down pins. The game displays players' scores in a similar way to the displays found in traditional bowling alleys. The game ends when all players have completed the ten frames.

== Upgrading HyperBowl ==
The version of HyperBowl included in Microsoft Plus! for Windows XP contains two of the six lanes initially available (Classic and Pins of Rome) and is designed for a single player. When the upgrade has been purchased and installed, four additional lanes are installed. Multiplayer support is also enabled, allowing up to four players to bowl and keep track of their scores during a game.

== Other versions ==
HyperBowl was originally developed by Sony Development along with other games introduced in the Sony Metreon in June 1999. It featured a tall projection screen for the display and a real bowling ball as a trackball-style controller. The attraction version has since been installed in venues such as Jillian's, GameWorks and Dave & Buster's. Sony Development eventually spun off independently to become Hyper Entertainment, which currently retains the IP. The attraction version is currently supported by Jesler Enterprises.

HyperBowl Arcade Edition is a version of HyperBowl Plus! Edition sold directly by Hyper Entertainment. Support was discontinued on April 1, 2007 due to the advent of Windows Vista. However, the game can be run under compatibility mode (or Windows XP Mode in Windows 7).

Versions of HyperBowl implemented with the Unity game engine are available as web players, Mac widgets, Mac and Windows standalone executables, iOS and Android apps. These are developed by Technicat, LLC, under license from Hyper Entertainment.
