= Hexic 2 =

2007 video game

- Developer: Carbonated Games
- Publisher: Microsoft Game Studios
- Designer: Alexey Pajitnov
- Composers: Stan LePard; Jerry Schroeder
- Series: Hexic
- Platform: Xbox 360
- Release: August 15, 2007
- Genre: Puzzle
- Modes: Single-player, multiplayer

Hexic 2 is the sequel to Alexey Pajitnov's puzzle game Hexic, developed by Carbonated Games. It was released for Xbox 360 via Xbox Live Arcade on August 15, 2007.

== Gameplay ==
Typical "Battle" gameplay screenshot.

Hexic 2 is a puzzle game where the player manipulates hexagonal "gems" of various colours on a board. Gems are moved by rotating them in groups of three. If the player's actions result in a set of three or more coloured gems that each border more than one edge of each other, that set is removed from the board. Each colour has a meter on the board which accumulates every time a corresponding match is made; when a meter is full, the player can deplete it and prepare "attacks" on the board.

Additionally, the player can create special gems with other patterns. An Emerald can be created by lining up five adjacent gems, which allows the players to flip gems on both sides of it. Starflowers can be created with a ring of six gems. A row of five Starflowers can be used to create a Ruby, which manipulates four gems on two sides adjacent to it. The ultimate piece is a Black Pearl, which allows the player to manipulate three adjacent gems.

The game introduces the new "Battle" mode, where the player is pitted against the computer (or another online player) in a race to fill their meter bar before the other. This is done by clearing pieces from the board, as well as deploying various attacks on the opponent. Additionally, the game incorporates the original modes from its predecessor: an untimed and infinite "Marathon", a timed version called the "Timed Marathon," and a "Survival" where the player has to avoid running out of moves.

To execute an attack, the player must wait until the correct symbol appears out of a rotating set. Attacks include a bomb which can be deployed on an opponent's board, clearing part of one's own board, locking an opponent's tiles, or reducing the size of an opponent's board.

== Reception ==
Reception

Aggregate score
Aggregator	Score
Metacritic	72/100

Review scores
Publication	Score
Eurogamer	7/10
GameSpot	7.5/10
GamesRadar+	3.5/5
IGN	6.5/10

Video game aggregator site Metacritic stated that the game received "mixed or average" reviews.

IGN reviewer David Craddock called the price of the game "outrageous" when the predecessor was free. While Eurogamer reviewer Kristan Reed stated that it "doesn't add all that much", he thought that there were "just about enough tweaks and changes" to make it worth purchasing.

Craddock criticised the puzzle gameplay as intensely complex, stating that "simply put, there's just too much going on". GamesRadar writer Greg Sewart perceived as too similar to its predecessor, saying it "feels like a rehash". Reviewer Jeff Gerstmann of GameSpot was more positive, stating that "If you're after a first-rate puzzle game, Hexic 2 fits the bill nicely".

Gerstmann also praised the 3D graphics, describing them as a "solid upgrade" from the two-dimensional art of its predecessor. Reed said the visuals had an "appealing acid fried set of effects" which would appeal to "fans of LSD". However, they were also criticised by Craddock, who stated that they gave the gems a "fuzzy look" which resembled "how the entire world looks first thing in the morning".
