= Hexic =

2003 video game

- Hexic on Windows 8.1
- Developers: Carbonated Games, Astraware (Windows Mobile), Other Ocean (Windows Store)
- Publisher: Microsoft Game Studios
- Designer: Alexey Pajitnov
- Series: Hexic
- Platforms: Xbox 360, Zune, MSN Games, MSN Messenger, Windows Live Messenger, Windows, Windows Mobile, Windows Phone, Windows Store
- Release: Windows: WW: July 2003; Xbox 360 (XBLA): WW: November 22, 2005; Windows Mobile: WW: March 27, 2009
- Genre: Puzzle
- Mode: Single-player

Hexic is a 2003 tile-matching puzzle video game developed by Carbonated Games for various platforms. In Hexic, the player tries to rotate hexagonal tiles to create certain patterns. The game is available on Windows, Xbox 360, Windows Phone and the web. Many clones are available for Android and iOS. The game was designed by Alexey Pajitnov, best known as the creator of Tetris. While most earlier releases of the game were developed by Carbonated Games, the most recent version released for Windows and Windows Phone is developed by Other Ocean. The name is a portmanteau of the words "hectic" and "hexagon".

== Gameplay ==
Hexic on MSN Games

The objective of Hexic is to rotate hexagonal pieces of various colours and clear them from the playfield by forming clusters or flowers. Clusters are formed when three pieces of the same colour touch each other. Pieces above the cleared pieces fall, potentially forming more clusters and causing chain reactions, and new pieces appear at the top of the playfield. Bonuses are awarded for clearing more than three pieces at a time, and some pieces contain bonus stars, which yield extra points and can clear larger groups of pieces depending on how they are cleared.

The player can create a "gold-star" by arranging six like-coloured pieces into a hexagon or "flower", surrounding a piece of a different colour or type. The surrounding pieces are cleared, and the center piece is replaced by a silver-star (unless the center piece was already a silver-star, in which case a new silver-star drops from the top). A gold-star allows the player to rotate all surrounding pieces clockwise or counterclockwise. Forming a flower of silver-stars changes the center piece into a black pearl, which allows the player to move three surrounding pieces in a Y or inverted Y pattern. The ultimate goal of the game is to form a cluster or flower of black pearls, after which the game will end.

Bombs appear occasionally throughout the game. A bomb is coloured like other pieces on the board and can be defused by rotating it into a cluster or flower of the same colour. The counter on the bomb counts down with each move, and if allowed to reach zero, it explodes and the game is over. Defusing a bomb by clustering it with at least one multiplier piece of the same colour causes all pieces of the same colour as the bomb to instantly clear from the playfield.

Hexic offers two variations on the standard Marathon mode: In Timed mode, a timer constantly counts down toward zero, and the game ends when time runs out. The amount of time increases with successful clears, and resets to its maximum value when the player forms a starflower. Creating starflowers also increases the maximum amount of time available, up to two minutes.

Survival mode challenges the player to completely clear the playfield. Unlike in Marathon and Timed modes, clearing pieces from the playfield does not automatically cause new ones to fall from the top. Instead, the player forms clusters and flowers until no more moves are possible, then any remaining pieces are locked in place and all open spaces are filled with new pieces. Clearing clusters with bonus stars causes nearby locked pieces to become unlocked. Forming a flower unlocks all pieces on the board and causes all pieces the same color as the center piece in the flower to clear from the board. If the player successfully clears the entire playfield or survives fifty rounds, they win the game. The game is over if all pieces on the playfield become locked.

The gameplay music from Hexic HD, released with the Xbox 360 in 2005, is from the album Hexophilia, an experiment in loop-based composition composed by Jerry Schroeder.

== Development ==
Hexic HD on Xbox Live Arcade

Hexic was originally developed by Carbonated Games and was released on the MSN Games online service in July 2003. A downloadable deluxe edition was also made available soon after. A variation of the game called Hexic HD was later developed by Microsoft Game Studios (since renamed Xbox Game Studios) and Carbonated Games for the Xbox 360, and comes preinstalled on all Xbox 360 hard drives as part of the Xbox Live Arcade service; it was previously only available by calling Microsoft's Service Center but later became available on the Xbox Marketplace as a free download. This version features online leaderboards and support for high-definition.

In August 2007, Microsoft released Hexic 2 on Xbox Live Arcade, providing new gameplay features and a competitive two-player mode. Additionally, Hexic Deluxe for Tablet PC was released for Windows XP Tablet PC Edition as part of the Education Pack for Tablet PC, allowing players to rotate pieces using a stylus.

Hexic comes with the Zune version 3.0 firmware, released September 16, 2008.

In March 2014, a completely redesigned version of the game was released for the Windows and Windows Phone as a Windows Store app. This version of the game was developed by Other Ocean and Microsoft Studios. It sported a completely redesigned user interface, graphics, and sounds. The game was also Xbox LIVE enabled, meaning that players could earn Xbox LIVE achievements and take spot in leaderboards.

Game	Release	Platform	Developer
Hexic	July 2003	Web via MSN Games	Carbonated Games
Holiday Hexic	2003	Web via MSN Games	Carbonated Games
Hexic	July 17, 2003	MSN Messenger (6.0)	Carbonated Games
Hexic Deluxe	2005	Windows XP	Carbonated Games
Hexic Deluxe for Tablet PC	July 24, 2005	Windows XP Tablet PC Edition as part of the Microsoft Education Pack	Carbonated Games
Hexic HD	November 22, 2005	Xbox 360 via Xbox Live Arcade	Carbonated Games
Hexic	June 19, 2006	Windows Live Messenger (8.0)	Carbonated Games
Hexic Deluxe	August 21, 2006	Windows 2000/XP/Windows Vista/Windows 7	Astraware
Hexic 2	August 15, 2007	Xbox 360 via Xbox Live Arcade	Carbonated Games
Hexic	March 27, 2008	Windows Mobile	Astraware
Hexic	September 16, 2008	Zune	Carbonated Games
Hexic Rush	October 21, 2010	Windows Phone	Carbonated Games
Hexic	March 23, 2014	Windows Store (PC and Mobile)	Other Ocean
