= Microsoft Digital Image =

Discontinued raster graphics editor and image organization suite

- Developer: Microsoft
- Final release: 2006 Anniversary Edition (v11) / 19 September 2006; 20 years ago
- Operating system: Windows 98 SE; Windows Me; Windows 2000; Windows XP
- Type: Raster graphics editor; Image organizer
- License: Proprietary commercial software
- Website: web.archive.org/web/20070309192211/http://www.microsoft.com/products/imaging/default.mspx/

Microsoft Digital Image is a discontinued raster graphics editor and image organization program suite created by Microsoft. It is a successor to Microsoft Picture It!.

Microsoft Digital Image came in three different editions: Digital Image Standard, which only offers Digital Image Editor for editing images, Digital Image Suite, which adds Digital Image Library for viewing and organizing images and Digital Image Suite Plus, which includes tools from Digital Image Suite and the video editing tools of Pinnacle Studio. Digital Image has support for older Adobe Photoshop plugins. Later versions also includes Photo Story 3.1.

The latest version of this product was Digital Image 2006. This version had native support for Raw camera formats from Canon (.CRW) and Nikon (.NEF) On 19 September 2006, Microsoft released an "anniversary edition" which offered Windows Vista compatibility, removed raw support, and added support for Extensible Metadata Platform (XMP) metadata.

The software product was generally well received and praised for its ease of use.

On 15 June 2007, Microsoft announced that the Microsoft Digital Image suite would be discontinued because most of the feature set in the Digital Image suite of applications had been integrated into newer Microsoft titles and services, including Windows Photo Gallery.
