= List of Zune applications =

Zune applications were mobile apps and games that were available for Microsoft's Zune portable media players. Some of the games were multiplayer-capable and could be played with other Zune devices within Wireless reach. Zune HD games and applications were available in the "Apps" section of Zune Marketplace for free. There were forty-two games and twenty other applications officially released for the Zune HD over the span of two years.

On August 31, 2012, the "Apps" section of the Zune Marketplace and users' Zune media collections were disabled by Microsoft within the Zune Software, although it can be reenabled by editing the software's registries. All apps could still be downloaded directly to Zune HD devices using their own "Marketplace" option. As of December 2013, registry edits no longer allow the Zune app marketplace to work and apps can no longer be purchased directly via the device.

== List of Zune HD applications ==
Zune HD games
Title	Developer	Genre	Release date	Version
3D Picture Puzzle	Microsoft Studios	Puzzle	March 23, 2011	1.0
A Beanstalk Tale	Dino Games	Action	December 16, 2010	1.0
Animalgrams	Microsoft Studios	Puzzle	July 29, 2010	1.0
Audiosurf: Tilt	Dylan Fitterer	Music	November 1, 2009	1.0
BBQ Battle	Microsoft Studios	Action	April 1, 2011	1.1
Bees!!!	Babaroga	Action	June 23, 2011	1.0
Castles and Cannons	Microsoft Studios	Action	September 30, 2010	1.0
Checkers^{a}	Microsoft Studios	Board	November 1, 2009	1.0
Chess	Microsoft Studios	Board	November 1, 2009	1.1
ColorSpill	2Play Mobile	Puzzle	July 29, 2011	1.0
Decoder Ring	Babaroga	Puzzle	July 29, 2011	1.0
Dr. Optics Light Lab	Microsoft Studios	Puzzle	September 30, 2010	1.0
Finger Physics	PressOK Entertainment	Puzzle	December 16, 2010	1.0
Goo Splat	Microsoft Studios	Action	November 1, 2009	1.1
Hairball	DBA Game Studios	Action	November 20, 2010	1.0
Halfbrick Echoes	Halfbrick Studios	Action	June 23, 2011	1.1
Hearts	Microsoft Studios	Card	May 18, 2010	1.0
Hexic^{a}	Microsoft Studios	Puzzle	September 1, 2009	1.0
Labyrinth	Microsoft Studios	Action	April 27, 2010	1.0
Lucky Lanes Bowling	Babaroga	Sports	November 1, 2009	1.0
Music Quiz	Microsoft Studios	Music	August 19, 2010	1.0
Penalty! Flick Soccer	2Play Mobile	Sports	February 18, 2011	1.2
Project Gotham Racing: Ferrari Edition	Microsoft Studios	Racing	November 1, 2009	1.0
Reversi	2moro	Board	June 23, 2011	1.0
Run and Jump	Microsoft Studios	Action	June 23, 2011	1.0
Shell Game...of the Future!	Microsoft Studios	Action	November 1, 2009	1.1
Slider Puzzle	Babaroga	Puzzle	July 29, 2011	1.1
Snowball	Microsoft Studios	Action	December 16, 2010	1.1
Solitaire	Microsoft Studios	Card	April 27, 2010	1.1
Space Battle 2^{a}^{*}	Babaroga	Action	September 1, 2009	1.0
Spades	Microsoft Studios	Card	May 18, 2010	1.0
Splatter Bug	2Play Mobile	Action	July 29, 2011	1.0
Sudoku^{a}	Microsoft Studios	Puzzle	September 1, 2009	1.0
SuperNova	Microsoft Studios	Puzzle	June 23, 2011	1.0
Texas Hold 'em^{a}	Microsoft Studios	Card	November 1, 2009	1.1
Tiki Totems	Spokko	Puzzle	December 16, 2010	1.1
Tiles	Microsoft Studios	Puzzle	October 20, 2010	1.0
Trash Throw	2Play Mobile	Action	July 29, 2011	1.0
Tug-O-War	2Play Mobile	Action	July 29, 2011	1.0
Vans Sk8: Pool Service	Fuel Industries	Sports	November 1, 2009	1.0
Vine Climb	2Play Mobile	Action	July 29, 2011	1.1
Wordmonger	Foundation 42	Puzzle	September 30, 2010	1.0

^aGame was also released for older Zune devices. ^*(Note: Space Battle 2 is the Zune HD version of the original Space Battle for pre-HD Zune devices.)

Zune HD applications
Title	Developer	Category	Function	Release date	Version
Alarm Clock	Microsoft	Utilities	Alarm clock function that uses the Zune HD's internal clock.	December 16, 2010	1.1
Calculator	Microsoft	Utilities	Scientific and basic calculator usable in portrait and landscape modes.	September 1, 2009	1.0
Calendar	Matchbox	Utilities	Virtual calendar and scheduler.	July 29, 2011	1.0.0.3
Chord Finder	Microsoft	Utilities	Virtual guitar used to find power chords.	November 17, 2010	1.0
Drum Machine HD	Dino Games	Utilities	Virtual drum kit.	October 20, 2010	1.0
Email	Microsoft	Utilities	Displays and sends emails via Hotmail, Windows Live Messenger, Exchange, Outlook Web App, and Gmail.	April 1, 2011	1.1.0.1
Facebook	Matchbox	Social Networking	Facebook application.	December 16, 2010	1.4
Fan Prediction	iHwy, Inc.	Entertainment	Show and predict collegiate and professional sports game results.	June 23, 2011	1.0
Fingerpaint	Babaroga	Entertainment	Draw images on the Zune HD touch screen. Also has a multiplayer guessing game option.	July 29, 2011	1.1
Level	Microsoft	Utilities	Virtual spirit level that uses the Zune HD's accelerometer.	June 23, 2011	1.0
Metronome	Dino Games	Utilities	Virtual metronome.	September 9, 2010	1.0
MSN Money	Microsoft	Utilities	Stock checker, financial news reader, and currency converter.	July 29, 2010	1.0
Notes	Microsoft	Utilities	Virtual notepad.	June 23, 2011	1.0
Piano	Microsoft	Entertainment	Virtual musical keyboard.	November 1, 2009	1.0
Shuffle by Album	Microsoft	Utilities	Music player that allows for the random shuffling of albums without changing the order of songs within the albums.	February 18, 2011	1.1
Stopwatch	Microsoft	Utilities	Stopwatch application with lap splitting and countdown timer.	August 5, 2010	1.1
Twitter	Matchbox	Social Networking	Twitter application.	December 16, 2010	1.6
Weather	Microsoft	Utilities	Displays current and predicted weather conditions from MSN Weather.	September 1, 2009	1.0
Windows Live Messenger	Microsoft	Social Networking	Messenger application.	November 17, 2010	1.4
Zune Reader	Microsoft	Utilities	E-book reader.	February 18, 2011	1.2
