= Metreon =

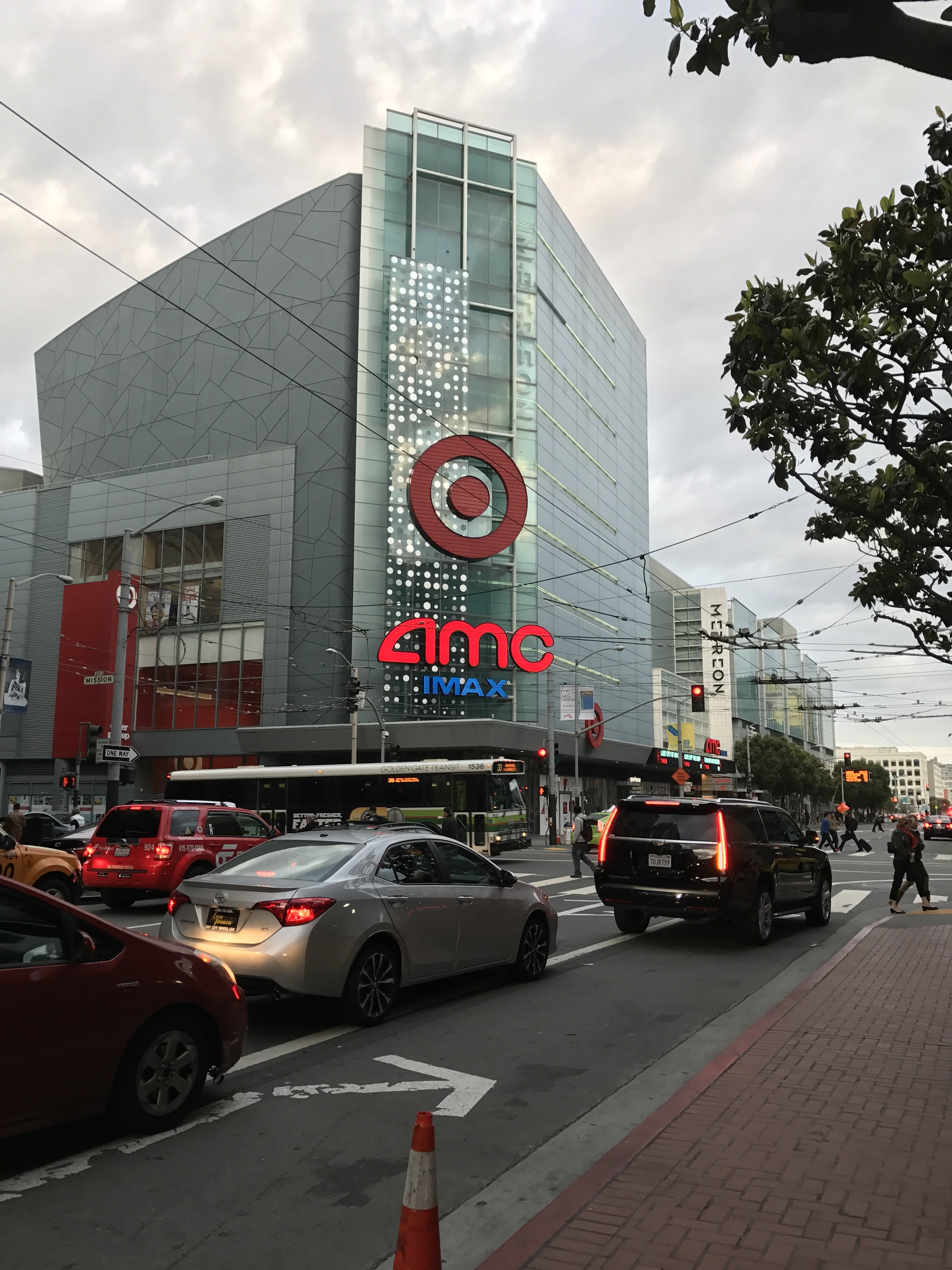
- Northwest view (May 2017)
- Location: San Francisco, California, U.S.
- Coordinates: 37.784374°N 122.403424°W
- Address: 135 Fourth Street, 94103
- Opened: June 16, 1999; 27 years ago
- Developer: Sony
- Manager: Unibail-Rodamco-Westfield
- Owner: Starwood Capital Group
- Architect: Handel Architects
- Num. of stores: 25
- Num. of anchor tenants: 1
- Floor area: 350,000 square feet (33,000 m^{2})
- Floors: 4
- Parking: 1,800 paid spaces
- Public transit: Powell Street station
- Website: shoppingmetreon.com

The Metreon is a shopping center located in downtown San Francisco, California, United States at the corner of 4th Street and Mission Street. It is a four-story 350,000 sq ft (33,000 m^{2}) building built over the corner of the underground Moscone Center convention center. Metreon opened on June 16, 1999, as the first of a proposed chain of Sony "urban entertainment centers", aggregating dining, games, music, exhibitions, shopping, and movies. Sony intended the ambitious US$85 million (equivalent to $164 million in 2025) project to be a theme park and gallery for Sony products, and to reinforce a sophisticated image for the Sony brand.

In 2006, Metreon was sold to Westfield Group, an Australian-based mall developer, and it was refashioned as a food-oriented mall. In 2011, most remaining businesses in the mall were closed. Westfield began a major renovation with an emphasis on dining, including Target, creating a large downtown department store that now takes up the second floor. In April 2012, Westfield sold the Metreon to Starwood Capital Group. Westfield (and its successor, Unibail-Rodamco-Westfield) continues to be responsible for management.

== History ==
The Metreon's original attractions included a movie theater with both standard and IMAX screens, a multimedia edutainment presentation involving audio-animatronics and 3-D film based on the famous book The Way Things Work by David Macaulay, a play area for young children based on Maurice Sendak's popular children's book Where the Wild Things Are (sharing a floor with an In the Night Kitchen themed restaurant), and an arcade and bar, the Airtight Garage, based on French comic artist and graphic designer Jean "Moebius" Giraud's graphic novel of the same name and featuring all original games.

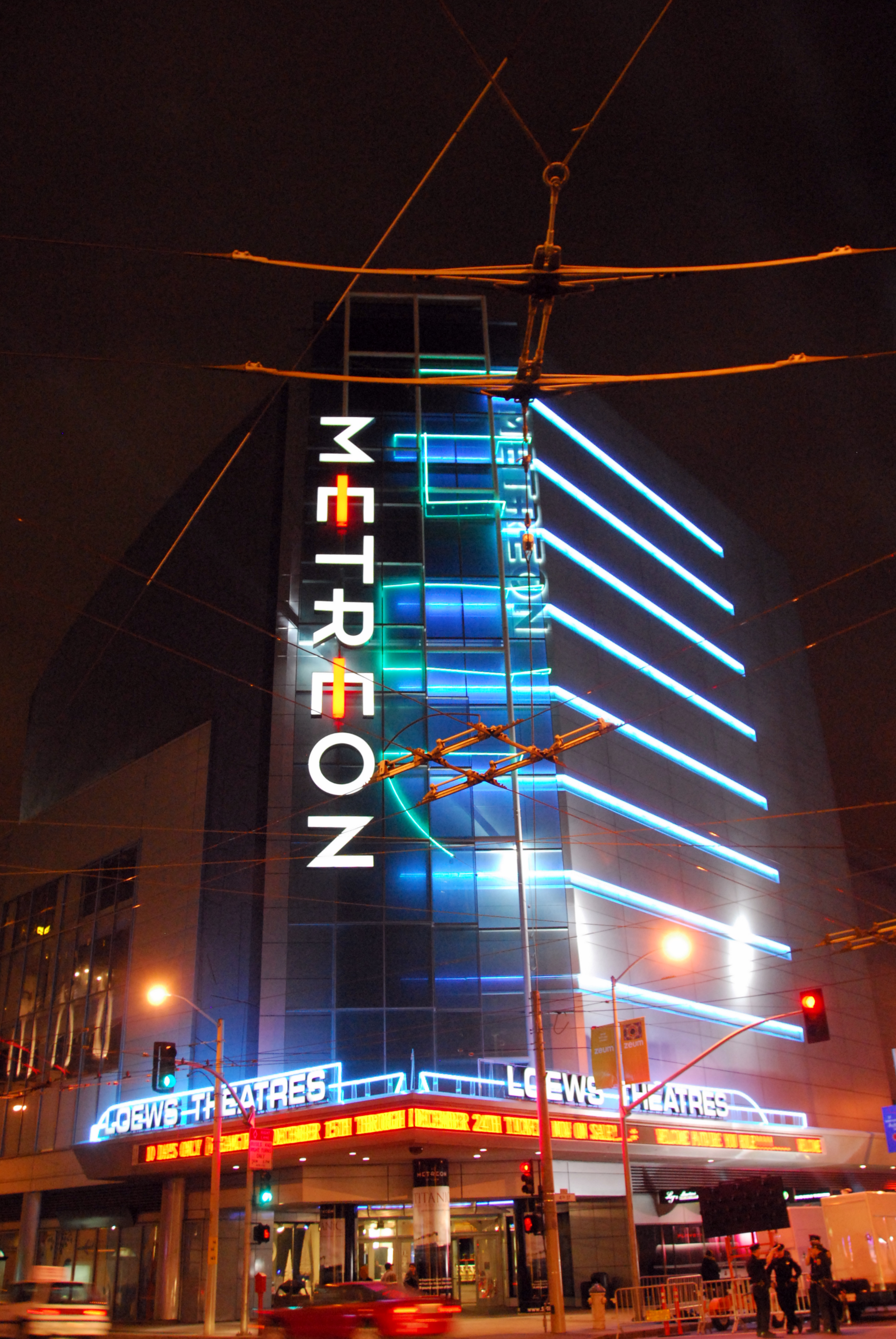
The Metreon at night, prior to its sale to Westfield

In October 2001, Metreon, in partnership with Sony's anime television network, Animax, was host to an anime festival, in which numerous anime videos were broadcast across its Action Theatre. As a hub for Sony products, the Metreon often hosted special events for the public when new products were released. Consumers flocked to the Metreon for high-demand items such as the PlayStation, PlayStation 2, PlayStation Portable, and PlayStation 3.

Although Sony opened two additional centers in Tokyo and Berlin in 1999, the original center failed to turn the expected profit. Sony promised first-year foot traffic of six million, one million above pre-launch projections, but by mid 2001 "The Way Things Work" was closed. The other major exhibit, "Where the Wild Things Are," closed sometime after July 2004.

The Airtight Garage's games were unpopular, with the exception of HyperBowl, a 3D obstacle course bowling game featuring air-supported bowling balls used as trackballs, and they were gradually replaced by other, better-known games. The arcade was finally closed, then reopened as Portal One, which preserved the decor, full bar, and Hyperbowl but was otherwise a typical arcade. May 13, 2007 was Portal One arcade's last day of operation. The arcade was relaunched again as a Tilt.

The 16-screen Loews (now AMC) theater was a success, becoming one of the most profitable theaters in the country and claiming much of the Metreon foot traffic; the lease agreement did not apportion ticket or concession sales to Metreon, however.

By 2002, persistent rumors said that Sony wished to withdraw from management of the property. In February 2006, Metreon was sold to The Westfield Group, the owner of the nearby Westfield San Francisco Centre shopping mall, and Forest City Enterprises, a real estate development company.

In early 2009, Sony announced that it would be closing the Sony and PlayStation stores, the last flagship stores located in the mall. Following the announcement, on March 3, 2009, the San Francisco Redevelopment Agency approved plans from owners Westfield Group and Forest City Enterprises to renovate Metreon into a "restaurant-centric" mall. Expected modifications include relocation of the Fourth and Mission street entrance to the center of the block and the installation of a food terrace facing Yerba Buena Gardens. The San Francisco Filipino Cultural Center and the "Tavern on the Green" restaurant were projected tenants. Tavern on the Green, however, entered bankruptcy on September 11, 2009, "throwing into doubt" the plans for the Metreon location.

The Metreon building has been redeveloped as a Target store, opened in October 2012. Target is leasing 99,677 square feet (9,260.3 m^{2}). The other tenants are the AMC theater (now with its own entrance), a food court, Chronicle Books, Massage Envy, National University, The City View event space, and various other food purveyors not directly in the court. The Sanraku sushi restaurant and Buckhorn sandwich shop remain in the new food court, along with Jillians, which is now only accessible from outside. The movie theater has also experienced upgrades, with the IMAX auditorium now featuring their new laser projector, and the addition of Dolby Cinema and recliner seats.

Cal Hacks began hosting its annual hackathon at The Metreon in 2023.

== Features ==
The Metreon 16, an IMAX 3D movie theater and Dolby Cinema theater operated by AMC Theatres, and Jillians, a restaurant, were the only attractions that remained open when Target opened in 2012.

The Walk of Game is loosely based on the Walk of Fame, in which honorees include Shigeru Miyamoto, Nolan Bushnell, StarCraft, Sid Meier, John D. Carmack, Super Mario, Sonic The Hedgehog, and Link from The Legend of Zelda series. A special Walk of Game event took place there in 2005 and 2006. It was unknown that it would ever continue and is now most likely obsolete, now that Target is taking up the second floor where the Walk of Game was.

A seven-day-a-week farmers' market operated as an interim tenant in the former Discovery Channel Store space between May and November 2009.

The Michelin-starred Tsuta ramen shop in Tokyo, Japan, expanded into the Metreon in October 2019.
