= Microsoft Entertainment Pack: The Puzzle Collection =

1997 video game

- Developer: Mir - Dialogue (Note: Ported to Game Boy Color by Conspiracy Entertainment)
- Publishers: Microsoft Games; Game Boy Color: EU: Swing! Entertainment; NA: Conspiracy Entertainment (Note: Released under the Classified Games label)
- Designer: Alexey Pajitnov
- Platforms: Windows, Game Boy Color
- Release: July 31, 1997: Windows; NA: July 31, 1997 Game Boy Color; EU: August 2000; NA: October 24, 2000
- Genre: Puzzle
- Mode: Single player

Microsoft Entertainment Pack: The Puzzle Collection is a collection of 10 puzzle computer games developed by Mir - Dialogue and published by Microsoft Games. The creator of Tetris, Alexey Pajitnov, designed some of the games featured in the pack. It was released on CD-ROM for Windows 95. It was also bundled as part of the Microsoft Plus! Game Pack which was released after Windows Me.

A version was made for the Game Boy Color. It features six of the games from the PC version; Fringer, Charmer, Mixed Genetics, and Muddled Casino have been omitted.

== Presentation ==
Each game in the collection runs in a window using 256 colors. They use MIDI background music and digitized sound effects. Controls vary from game to game - each game uses either the keyboard or the mouse.

== Games ==
- Fringer - Untie all the knots in a stage before a knot is pushed to the bottom of the screen, at which point the game ends.
- Finty Flush - Fill a 4×4 grid with predetermined combinations of marbles before the screen fills up with too many marbles.
- Mixed Genetics - Breed mutated animals in groups of three to create pure animals.
- Rat Poker - Coloured rats enter and walk clockwise around a playing area. Rats will only exit if they line up in specific patterns such as three in a row of the same colour. The player lifts rats off the 'conveyor belt' onto rotating spokes, and then releases them again in the best order so that they will exit and the playing area is not overrun.
- Lineup - Various pentominoes composed of sports balls must be placed on the playing field to form a continuous row from one end to the other. When this is done, all shapes used to form the row will disappear. The game continues until the queue of shapes waiting to be placed fills up.
- Jewel Chase - Steal as much loot as possible before the other, computer-controlled robber does and get to the exit first or the player loses. The playing area is a colour maze. At any time a robber occupies a square made up of up to 4 different colours. When the player selects an arrow-key, the robber will move to the nearest square if available in that direction that has a colour in common with the current square. The game can be played in a training mode which allows you to walk the 100 colour mazes collecting all gems without a time limit.
- Color Collision - Control a flying carpet and hit sun-like discs of matching colour. Bonuses are scored for hitting discs when they are smiling, "turned on", or about to explode, etc. depending on the level.
- Charmer - Charm snakes to a vine to make their pots disappear, without letting the lids fall and create another pot.
- Spring Weekend - Arrange the garden critters into a certain pattern before your moves run out. The playing area is a hexagonal grid. By right-clicking or left-clicking on a hexagon position, all 6 adjacent hexagons will rotate clockwise or anti-clockwise respectively.
- Muddled Casino - Figure out how to move the cards off the table in the correct order to beat the house.

== Critical reception ==
=== Windows version ===
Reception

Review score
Publication	Score
Computer Gaming World	4/5

In Computer Gaming World, Charlotte Panther wrote that The Puzzle Collection "should please both serious puzzle fans and those looking for an occasional quick-fix." While she found its graphics lackluster and felt that "a couple of the puzzles are pretty lame", she summarized it as "a terrific collection".

Electric Games wrote that "while the games here are entertaining, there is nothing as innovative as [Tetris]". Adrenaline Vault said there was "an unexpected amount of depth to each game in the package and a lot of thought put into the creation of these puzzles", concluding that the pack "will keep you occupied and entertained for hours on end".

=== GBC version ===
IGN wrote "I really enjoy playing Microsoft Puzzle Collection, since each of the games are a lot of fun to pick up and kick around. " Nintendo Power Magazine decided that "Chances are, the diversions will hold your attention for only minutes at a time."

== See also ==
- Microsoft Entertainment Pack
- Microsoft Pinball Arcade
- Microsoft Arcade
