= Night Moves =

Night Moves may refer to:

== Music ==
- Night Moves (album), a 1976 album by Bob Seger & The Silver Bullet Band
  - "Night Moves" (Bob Seger song), the title song
- "Night Moves" (Marilyn Martin song), 1986
- Nightmoves, a 2007 album by Kurt Elling
- "Nightmoves", a song from Michael Franks' 1976 album The Art of Tea
- Night Moves, a 2002 album by Carolyn Breuer
- "Night Moves", a 1994 composition by Marilyn Crispell and Eddie Prévost from Band on the Wall
- Night Moves (band), a rock band

== Other media ==
- Night Moves (1975 film), a 1975 film directed by Arthur Penn and starring Gene Hackman
- Night Moves (2013 film), a 2013 film directed by Kelly Reichardt and starring Dakota Fanning and Jesse Eisenberg
- "The Night Moves", an episode of The O.C.
- "Night Moves" (Second Thoughts), a 1991 television episode
- "Night Moves", an episode of War of the Worlds
- Night Moves, a novel in the series Tom Clancy's Net Force
- Night Moves and Other Stories (2000), a short story collection by Tim Powers
- Night Moves (adventure), for the role-playing game Marvel Super Heroes
- Night Moves (TV series), a Canadian TV show from 1986–1993
- Night Moves (poetry collection), a 2013 book by Stephanie Barber
- Night Moves (memoir), a 2018 memoir by music critic Jessica Hopper

== See also ==
- Knight Moves (disambiguation)
- "Night Moves On", a 1996 single by Abigail
