= Knight Move =

1990 video game

- Developer: JV Dialog
- Publisher: Nintendo
- Producer: Tsunekazu Ishihara
- Designer: Alexey Pajitnov
- Composer: Hirokazu Tanaka
- Platform: Famicom Disk System
- Release: JP: June 5, 1990
- Genre: Puzzle-platform
- Modes: Single-player, multiplayer

Knight Move (ナイト・ムーブ) is a puzzle-platform game designed by Tetris creator Alexey Pajitnov and developed by JV Dialog. Based on the knight's tour sequence in chess, the game has the player take control of a single knight piece that constantly moves in its characteristic L-shaped pattern on a tiled board. The objective of each round is to collect hearts on the board while avoiding holes that are left when the knight lands each tile a set number of times.

JV Dialog, a joint American-Soviet consortium founded in 1987, purchased Knight Move from Pajitnov that same year. The game was published by Nintendo for the Famicom Disk System exclusively in Japan in 1990. It never saw another release, though a sequel titled Knight Moves was published for Microsoft Windows in 1995.

== Gameplay ==
In-game screenshot of Knight Move (A-Type mode)

Based around the L-shaped movement of the knight piece in the game of chess, Knight Move is a puzzle-platformer where the player controls a knight on a board consisting of four tiles by eight tiles. The knight is constantly jumping in an L-shaped pattern and the player must continually choose one of several legal moves using a cursor showing any possible landing spots as it briefly hovers in the air. During each round, a single heart is present somewhere on the board at any given time. The player's main objective in Knight Move is to clear rounds by directing the knight to land on hearts to advance to the next round and reach the highest score possible. Landing on any tile turns it from white to light teal. Landing there again, turns it dark teal. Landing there a third time destroys the tile altogether, leaving a hole that the player must avoid as falling in will result in a game over. Collecting a heart replaces all holes on the board with new white tiles. The knight's movement speed increases with each round change.

In the game's A-Type mode, the player must only collect a single, stationary heart to complete a round. In B-Type mode, the player must collect multiple hearts to advance and each heart changes its position on the board every six turns. While landing on hearts improves the player's score, consecutively creating several holes results in a chain increasing it in differing increments. The player can also gather a small number of extra points, at any time, by holding the 'A' face button and manually speeding up the knight. In addition to its single-player, the game includes a simultaneous two-player versus mode where the goal is reach five hearts before the opponent does.

== Development and release ==
Knight Move was designed by Alexey Pajitnov, best known for creating the puzzle game Tetris. Pajitnov stated that he made Knight Move shortly after Tetris in 1986 or 1987 and that it was his own version of the classic knight's tour chessboard sequence. "It's not a chess game,” he described. "I just exploited the chessboard and the knight's movement pattern. It's a wonderful thing." Pajitnov sold the rights to the game to Joint Venture (JV) Dialog in 1987. Founded that same year in Russia, JV Dialog was an early startup established between the United States and the Soviet Union in the waning days of the Cold War and would become a consortium of more than 100 companies including software development.

Knight Move was released exclusively in Japan by Nintendo on the Famicom Disk System on June 5, 1990. American company Spectrum HoloByte planned to distribute an international version as early as 1992. However, this would not occur until 1995 when the publisher partnered with Kinesoft on Knight Moves for Microsoft Windows, which features 3D graphics and expanded gameplay mechanics. Pajitnov said this incarnation was released with his endorsement and approval though he had no input on it.

== Reception ==
Knight Move received a total score of 26 out of 40 from four reviewers in Famicom Tsūshin. The writers praised its gameplay as simple yet deep and addictive, standing on its own merit when set apart from its creator's previous work Tetris. NF Magazine editor Lucas M. Thomas summarized the game as "frantic and fun," lamenting its exclusivity to Japan.
