= Ice & Fire =

1995 video game

- Developer: Zombie Studios
- Publisher: GT Interactive
- Designers: Alexey Pajitnov; Vladimir Pokhilko
- Platforms: Windows, Classic Mac OS
- Release: September 1995
- Genres: First-person shooter, puzzle

Ice & Fire is a 1995 first-person shooter puzzle video game from Zombie Studios. The game was described as a cross between Doom and Concentration.

== Gameplay ==
In Ice and Fire, players are cast as the last hope for a desolate asteroid known as IF-1, armed only with elemental blasters and a mandate to revive a frozen world. The game unfolds across a series of increasingly intricate mazes populated by alien foes, demanding both spatial memory and puzzle-solving endurance. Each level hides passwords essential for progression, often leaving players scouring for elusive keys long after the combat has ended. The outer shell of the asteroid itself forms a larger navigational maze, where players must make split-second directional choices while flying and engaging enemies. A map overlay is provided for assistance.

== Development ==
Ice & Fire was developed with the help of Tetris creators Alexey Pajitnov and Vladimir Pokhilko. The game had a marketing budget of $1 million.

== Reception ==
Reception

Review scores
| Publication | Score |
|---|---|
| GameSpot | 5/10 |
| Hyper | 55% |
| Power Play | 23% |

GameSpot gave the game a score of five out of ten, stating: "This game tests patience and logic, and Doom fans will find the only similarities here are the first-person perspective and the letter 'D' in the name. A tedious puzzle game in action game's clothing."

The game was not a big commercial success.
