= El-Fish =

1993 video game

- Developer: AnimaTek
- Publishers: Mindscape; Maxis (re-release)
- Designer: Alexey Pajitnov
- Platforms: MS-DOS, Mac, FM Towns
- Release: March 1993
- Genre: Life simulation
- Mode: Single-player

El-Fish is a fish and fish-tank simulator and software toy developed by Russian game developer AnimaTek, with Maxis providing development advice. The game was published by Mindscape (v1.1) and later by Maxis (v1.1 + v1.2) in 1993 on 5 diskettes.

Each fish in El-Fish has a unique Roe, similar to the genome. This allows the user to catch fish and use selective breeding and mutation to create fish to their own tastes for placing them in virtual aquariums. Around 800 possible genetic attributes (fin shape, body color, size, etc.) are available, which can be selectively shaped into virtually infinite numbers of unique fish. Once fish are created, El-Fish will algorithmically generate up to 256 animation frames so that the fish will appear to swim smoothly around the tank.

The tank simulator is very customizable for this game's era. The player can select from a large number of backdrops and tank ornaments for the fish to swim between. The user can also import their own images to use as tank ornaments. El-Fish includes a fractal based plant generator for creating unique aquarium plants. There are several "moving objects" that can be added to the tanks which the fish will react to, such as a cat paw, fibcrab, and a small plastic scuba diver. The user can also procedurally generate background music for their tank using an in-game composer, or choose a separate MIDI music file to be played for each virtual aquarium, and feed the fish.

The tank simulator can run as a memory-resident program in MS-DOS, making it a screensaver. Multiple tanks can be displayed via El-Fish's slideshow feature.

== Development ==
El-Fish was created by Vladimir Pokhilko, Ph.D. and Alexey Pajitnov (the creator of Tetris), who had backgrounds in mathematics, computer science, and psychology. They were attempting to create software for INTEC (a company that they started) that would be made for "people's souls". They developed this idea, calling it "Human Software", with three rules:

- The software needs to be "aesthetically beautiful".
- The software needs to be constructive.
- The software needs to bring feeling to people that they would not otherwise enjoy.

== Reception ==
Reception

Review scores
Publication	Score
Satellite Times	92%
Power Unlimited	96/100

Computer Gaming World called the graphics as state-of-the-art, but questioned whether there was enough substance to warrant its purchase. The reviewer, an aquarium owner, criticized the "software toy" on its "inability to sustain the player's interest. Once the aquarium has been created and viewed, there just isn't much else happening", with no simulation of an ecosystem needing ongoing maintenance as he had hoped.

In 1996, Computer Gaming World declared El-Fish the 13th-worst computer game ever released.
