= Hatris =

1990 video game

- North American NES box art
- Developer: ParaGraph
- Publishers: Bullet-Proof Software; Video System Co. (arcade)
- Designers: Alexey Pajitnov; Vladimir Pokhilko
- Composers: Hiroshi Suzuki; Ikki Nakamura (NES)
- Series: Tetris
- Platforms: Arcade, NES, Game Boy, PC Engine, PC-9801, Sharp Wizard, mobile phone
- Release: April 1990: Arcade; WW: April 1990 NES; JP: July 6, 1990; NA: April 1992 Sharp Wizard; JP: December 1990 PC Engine; JP: May 24, 1991 Game Boy; NA: May 1991; JP: July 19, 1991 PC-9801; JP: October 18, 1991 Mobile phone; JP: April 1, 2004
- Genre: Puzzle
- Mode: Single-player

Hatris (ハットリス, Hattorisu) is a 1990 puzzle video game developed by Alexey Pajitnov and Vladimir Pokhilko of ParaGraph for Bullet-Proof Software. An arcade version was manufactured by Video System.

== Gameplay ==
The player must stack five hats of the same style to remove them from the board.

Hatris plays similarly to Pajitnov's previous Tetris, in that game objects falling from the top of the screen must be arranged in specific patterns to gain points and to keep the play area clear. In Hatris, hats of different styles fall from the top of the screen and accumulate at the bottom. To eliminate hats from the play area, five hats of identical style must be stacked. Different style hats stack differently.

== Development and release ==
Hatris was originally developed with different ideas, such as using utensils and other kitchen objects before eventually settling on hats. Alexey Pajitnov decided the team settled on hats as it was the most fun of the objects.

Hatris was showcased by Bullet-Proof Software at the Nintendo booth of the Consumer Electronics Show in 1990. An arcade version was developed by Video System.

== Ports ==
Hatris was released in arcades, on the Nintendo Entertainment System, Game Boy and PC Engine, and on the NEC PC-9801 home computer. Additionally, two versions of the game exist on the Sharp Wizard, the first of which released in December 1990, and the second, called Organizer Hatris, releasing in 1991.

Hatris DX, a mobile remake of the game, was released by Alti in 2004. Another mobile version of the game was released by G-Mode in 2006.

An unofficial port of Hatris exists on the Acorn Archimedes, being developed by Joeri De Winter and first releasing on 18 September 1997.

The Famicom, Game Boy and NES versions of the game are included in the compilation title Tetris Forever, released on November 12, 2024 for PC, Nintendo Switch, PlayStation 4, PlayStation 5, Xbox One and Xbox Series X/S.

== Reception ==
Reception

Review scores
Publication	Score
Computer and Video Games	88%
Famitsu	6/10, 7/10, 8/10, 4/10 (NES)
VideoGames & Computer Entertainment	7/10
Advanced Computer Entertainment	91.5%

In Japan, Game Machine listed the arcade version of Hatris as the eighteenth most successful table arcade unit of May 1990.

Entertainment Weekly gave the Game Boy version of Hatris an "A" and wrote: "There is, after all, a cure for Tetris addiction. It's Hatris, a habit that's even harder to kick."

Pajitnov later said in a 2018 interview with Retro Gamer that "sales didn't match our expectations, I still can't explain what was wrong with it and why it was not as addictive as we wanted it to be. We thought it had some smart moves so it was a big disappointment."
