= Photo Story =

Microsoft Photo Story
- Developer: Microsoft
- Stable release: 3.1 / 2006
- Operating system: Microsoft Windows XP
- Type: Photo sharing
- License: Proprietary

Microsoft Photo Story is a free application that allows users to create a visual story (show and tell presentation) from their digital photos. The software uses the Ken Burns Effect on digital photos and allows adding narration, effects, transitions and background music to create a Windows Media Video movie file with pan and zoom effects. Once a photo story has been made, it can be played on a PC using Windows Media Player. Since the .wmv format is used, Windows Media Video Image (a sub-set of Windows Media Video) is incompatible with domestic DVD players, users wishing to create a DVD or CD will need to use third-party tools to convert into DVD compatible (e.g. MPEG 2) format first.

Version 2 was included in Microsoft Plus! Digital Media Edition and Microsoft Digital Image Suite versions 9 and 10. It supported exporting the photo story as a Video CD. Version 3.0, although still a free download from Microsoft, removed direct Video CD burning, but supported a paid-for add-on from Sonic Solutions for exporting and burning the photo story to DVD.

The final free download version (3.0) includes the ability to randomly generate background music which is composed on the fly from a combination of themes and also includes basic photo editing and touchup features.

The last version of Photo Story (3.1) was included with the discontinued Microsoft Digital Image 2006. It restored the ability to burn a Video CD using the Sonic Burning engine.

To burn CDs or DVDs from files generated by version 3.0, users may purchase Sonic MyDVD DVD burning software or the Sonic DVD for Photo Story 3 for Windows plug in (which burns one DVD per Story). Third party tools, such as Media Coder, often do a very poor (low quality) job of converting Photo Story wmv files - Windows Movie Maker does a far better job of converting into an intermediate .avi format (although this will be some 30 times larger than the original wmv) which many DVD Authoring packages will accept as input. The final DVD compatible MPEG2 file size will typically be 5 to 6 times larger than the original .wmv file (or about 6 times smaller than the avi).

== History ==
Photo Story originally was based on a Microsoft Research project in photo sharing. The chief finding of that research was that people narrated better stories when they moved their hands, made gestures and pointed at their images. Early Photo Story prototype versions encouraged people to point at their images using the mouse, as the pointing would affect the algorithm that generated the pans and zooms.

The same research showed that users did not like the sound of their voice and tended to record their narration over and over again. This made the narration less spontaneous and the resulting stories less interesting if people were unable to express themselves clearly. Therefore, the early prototype had only one button, called the "Oops!" button. The research showed that if there was an OOPS! button available to undo their actions, people would be assured by its presence but would not use it unless they truly made a mistake during narration.

Photo Story was not included with Windows XP, though it was and continues to be made available as a free download to authenticated users.

Vista and Windows 7 both include Photo Story type applications (Windows Movie Maker and Windows DVD Maker), however some users still prefer the flexibility offered by the original.

== Limitations ==
The maximum number of images that may be imported in a single batch is 200. The maximum image size is 72,300 (width) x 7,200 (height) pixels. The maximum output resolution offered by Microsoft is 1024 x 768, however 3rd parties have developed new output .prx 'profiles' that, if placed in your \Photo Story 3 for Windows\Profiles\1033 sub-folder, can be selected at output time.

The single supported video output format is .wmv (using the Windows Media Video 9.1 Image codec, a subset of Windows Media Video). The single supported audio output format is AAC (Advanced Audio Coding).

The 'crop' and 'zoom' tool is fixed at 4:3 aspect ratio. To support 16:9 wide screen output (which is possible to obtain at output time using a third-party profile), it is necessary to 'pre-distort' all your imported images by adjusting the image height to 133.33%.

The chargeable 'Roxio' plug-in (now owned by Sony) allows users to 'burn' their completed 'story' direct to a DVD or CD. Sonic MyDVD (v5.5 or higher) is required if you want to edit the disc and add more stories or movies, thus more available storage.

Users should avoid any 'crop' or 'zoom' size below their intended output resolution - ideally, stop at twice the output size. If a smaller crop or zoom is required, significantly better results will be achieved by resizing the original in some third-party application (e.g. PaintShop Pro, PhotoShop) first.

Photo Story is not officially supported on the Vista or Windows 7 platform, although it downloads and installs fine on both Vista and Windows 7 32-bit and 64-bit.

== Reception ==
SmartComputing wrote: "Although Photo Story 3 doesn't support the video formats recommended by YouTube, it's still a friendly freebie that handles the basics. With default settings that cover most users' wants, this download is a hidden gem." PCMag said: "Microsoft Photo Story 3 is a truly significant upgrade, offering dramatic improvements to almost every feature."
