= Microsoft PhotoDraw =

Vector/raster graphics editing software

- A screenshot of PhotoDraw 2000 version 2.0 running on Windows 95.
- Developer: Microsoft
- Final release: v2.0 / October 4, 1999; 26 years ago
- Operating system: Microsoft Windows
- Included with: Microsoft Office 2000
- Successor: Microsoft Expression Design
- Type: Vector graphics editor
- License: Proprietary
- Website: office.microsoft.com

Microsoft PhotoDraw is a discontinued vector graphics and raster image editing software developed by Microsoft. It was released in 1999 as part of the Microsoft Office 2000 family of products and was specifically designed for creating and editing graphics, illustrations, and photo compositions.

PhotoDraw offered a range of features including image editing tools, drawing and painting capabilities, text manipulation, special effects, and the ability to work with layers. It also included templates and clip art to assist users in creating various types of designs, such as flyers, brochures, and web graphics.

Despite its initial popularity, Microsoft PhotoDraw did not receive significant updates or continued development. The last version released was PhotoDraw 2000, which came bundled with Microsoft Office 2000 Premium and was compatible with Windows 98 and later versions of Windows. Microsoft eventually discontinued PhotoDraw, and it is no longer actively supported or available for purchase.

== History ==
=== Microsoft PhotoDraw 2000 ===
Microsoft PhotoDraw 2000 was released in 1999 along with Microsoft Office 2000 Premium and Developer, but came separately on 2 CDs. It developed from the Picture It! 2.0 engine's .MIX format and expanded further into vector imaging technology. It required a separate installation from the main installer for the core Office suite, and was also released as a stand-alone product as part of Microsoft's Graphics Studio line of products (Greetings, etc.).

=== PhotoDraw 2000 Version 2 ===
It released the subsequent version called Microsoft PhotoDraw 2000 Version 2 to General Availability on October 4, 1999.

=== PhotoDraw Release Vehicles ===
PhotoDraw 2000 shipped via these release vehicles

- A standalone packaged product composed of 3 CDs.
- As part of Office 2000 Premium (CD 3 and CD 4)
- As part of Office 2000 Developer (CD 3 and CD 4)

PhotoDraw 2000 Version 2 shipped via these release vehicles

- A standalone packaged product composed of 3 CDs.
- As part of Office 2000 Premium SR-1 (CD 3 and CD4)
- As part of Office 2000 Developer SR-1 (CD 3 and CD4)

=== Relationship to the Office Suite ===
Both versions of PhotoDraw were branded "Microsoft Office Application," and considered a "member of the family," as were other Microsoft applications (most notably Publisher) at the time.

=== Discontinuation ===
After PhotoDraw 2000 Version 2 was released, Microsoft discontinued the program. Functional equivalent would be found in Expression Graphic Designer.

== Purpose and features ==
PhotoDraw is a full-featured dual-type (vector and bitmap) graphics software application like Adobe Fireworks, developed for semiprofessional business use. It includes a vast library of clip-art, and a good collection of additional fonts. Its user interface introduced an activity-based approach (manifested in special graphic menus), a concept later evolving into the Ribbon interface of modern MS Office and other applications.

As positioned mainly as an MS Office family companion and a business graphical solution suite, it was not useful enough for home users, who are more interested in manipulating digital pictures - which are bitmaps - than creating vector graphics. Microsoft has responded by bundling Windows Picture and Fax Viewer with Windows XP, developing Microsoft Picture It!, as well as creating Microsoft Office Picture Manager for Microsoft Office 2003 to expand on Microsoft Photo Editor. Furthermore, PhotoDraw was also not good enough to challenge Illustrator, the de facto standard for graphics professionals. For professional purposes Microsoft acquired, introduced and developed Microsoft Expression Studio, a graphics solution suite but it has been also discontinued, leaving MS Office users without any proper illustration tool with capabilities exceeding those of PowerPoint.

=== File Format Support ===
PhotoDraw's native file format is .MIX.

Photodraw can open files in these file formats:

- PhotoDraw 2000 Version 2 Format (*.MIX)
- PhotoDraw 2000 Version 1 Format (*.MIX)
- AutoCad Format 2-D (*.dxf)
- Computer Graphics Metafile (*.cgm)
- Corel Draw (*.cdr)
- Encapsulated PostScript (*.eps)
- Flashpix (*.fpx)
- Graphics Interchange Format (*.gif, *.gfa)
- JPEG File Interchange Format (*.jpg,*jpe,*.jpeg,*.jfif)
- Kodak Photo CD (*.pcd)
- Macintosh PICT (*.pct, *.pict)
- MicroGrafx Designer/Draw (*.drw)
- Microsoft Image Composer (*.mic)
- PC Paintbrush (*.pcx)
- Photoshop Files (*.psd)
- Picture It! Format (*.MIX)
- Portable Network Graphics (*.png)
- Tagged Image File Format (*.tif,*.tiff)
- Targa (*.tga)
- Windows Bitmap (*.bmp,*.dib,*rle)
- Windows Metafile (*.wmf)
- Windows Enhanced Metafile (*.emf)
- Wordperfect Graphics (*.wpg)

Photodraw can save files in these file formats:

- PhotoDraw 2000 Version 2 Format (*.MIX)
- PhotoDraw 2000 Version 1 Format (*.MIX)
- Graphics Interchange Format (*.gif)
- JPEG File Interchange Format (*.jpg)
- PC Paintbrush (*.pcx)
- Picture It! 4.0 (*.MIX)
- Picture It! 3.0 (*.MIX)
- Picture It! 2.0 (*.MIX)
- Portable Network Graphics (*.png)
- Tagged Image File Format (*.tif)
- Targa (*.tga)
- Windows Bitmap (*.bmp)

== Changes in PhotoDraw 2000 Version 2 ==
- Improved performance and stability
- New Batch Save Wizard
- Setup based on the Windows Installer engine
- Web effects
- Improved integration with Office applications
- Windows XP Compatibility
- Larger collection of clip-art and fonts
- New File Open/Save dialog boxes with places bar

== Use of the .MIX file format ==
PhotoDraw's native file format is ".mix", a proprietary format developed by Microsoft. Only PhotoDraw can save and load its MIX files and retain the full ability to modify those files.

The MIME media-type for the MIX format is "image/vnd.mix" (IANA assignment for the MIX format)

== Product Lifecycle for PhotoDraw 2000 V2 ==
- General Availability Date: 12/31/1999
- Mainstream Support Retired: 6/30/2004
- Extended Support Retired: 7/14/2009

== Availability ==
PhotoDraw is no longer available for purchase from Microsoft.
