= Pandora's Box (1999 video game) =

- Developer: Microsoft Game Studios
- Publisher: Microsoft Game Studios
- Designer: Alexey Pajitnov
- Platform: Microsoft Windows
- Release: NA: September 30, 1999
- Genre: Puzzle
- Mode: Single-player

Pandora's Box is a 1999 video game created by Alexey Pajitnov for Microsoft.

== Gameplay ==
In the game, players must travel around the world to different cities solving various kinds of puzzles to capture the seven "tricksters" - Maui, Puck, Eris, Coyote, Monkey, Anansi and Raven. Each trickster has a challenge puzzle after finding all the missing box pieces, acquired by solving the puzzle with each piece behind it in each city. The location of the pieces is randomized each game. The game offers sporadic bonuses. Hints are used to find where one piece goes if the player needs help figuring it out. Free puzzle tokens solve puzzles for the player if needed. A free puzzle token is awarded for every ten puzzles solved. Some puzzles, if solved in a limited amount of time, grant the location of the piece or additional hint/puzzle token.

=== Puzzle types ===
Most puzzle types in the game are variations on the basic concept of a tiling puzzle, and often involve famous paintings, statues, photos (usually from Corbis' archive) of notable places around the world, or other artifacts:

- Find and Fill is a puzzle where outlines of elements of an image are overlapped with each other, and the player must find and color elements, like a coloring book.
- Focus Point is a tiling puzzle where the player must switch tiles of a jumbled image to restore the original picture; however, tiles are of different size, and they stretch or squeeze if placed into a larger or smaller slot.
- Image Hole is a puzzle where the final image is invisible except through constantly moving holes that are the shapes of various elements of the image; the player must guide the holes to their correct places and lock them.
- Overlap is a jigsaw puzzle where pieces may overlap each other; some pieces contain parts of the background pattern for the easier initial placement.
- Interlock is a triangle-based dissection puzzle, where seven Pieces must be correctly ordered in a grid.
- Jesse's Strips is a jigsaw puzzle where pieces may overlap each other; pieces are also distributed among five different trays that filter out certain colors of the image.
- Lens Bender is a puzzle where the player must reconstruct an image by placing the pieces under various lens until they are distorted into a shape where they connect with each other.
- Outer Layer is a puzzle where the player must place parts of a texture back on a 3D object.
- Rotascope is a sliding puzzle that places the tiles on multiple concentric circles.
- Slices provides the player with a 3D object that was broken up to slices horizontally; the player must rotate the pieces and rebuild the object in the correct order.

Towards the end of the game, as the difficulty ramps up, some puzzles get combined into being stages of one larger puzzle, e.g. the player must first solve a Rotascope puzzle, where the result of that puzzle is actually a Focus Point puzzle.

== Reception ==
Pandora's Box won GameSpot's "Puzzles and Classics Game of the Year" award. The editors wrote that it "proved that [Pajitnov] was more than just the king of the simple game." It was a runner-up for Computer Games Strategy Plus's 1999 "Classic Game of the Year" award and Computer Gaming World's 1999 "Puzzle/Classics Game of the Year" award. The Electric Playground named it the best computer puzzle game of 1999. As a result, the game was re-released in a "Puzzle Game of the Year Edition", containing an additional 50 puzzles. During the 3rd Annual Interactive Achievement Awards, Pandora's Box received a nomination for "Computer Family Entertainment Title of the Year" by the Academy of Interactive Arts & Sciences.

It was PC Data's top-selling puzzle game for six weeks.
