= Altamira Software =

Computer software developer

- Company type: Private
- Industry: Software
- Founded: 1991
- Founder: Alvy Ray Smith, Eric Lyons, Nicholas Clay
- Fate: Acquired by Microsoft
- Headquarters: Mill Valley, California, U.S.
- Products: Altamira Composer
- Parent: Microsoft (1994–)

Altamira Software was an American software company. The company developed Altamira Composer, an early object-based image editing and composition application for Windows that introduced features such as anti-aliased effects and image sprites. Altamira Software was acquired by Microsoft in 1994.

== History ==
Altamira Software was founded in Mill Valley, California by Dr. Alvy Ray Smith, Eric Lyons and Nicholas Clay in 1991.

Seed capital came from Autodesk and second-round financing from a team of venture capitalists (TVI) and private individuals.

The company was acquired by Microsoft in 1994. Thea Grigsby was vice president of marketing. David Shantz of WildOutWest, LLC was responsible for branding, package design and the development of a series of image object libraries that were released along with the product.

== Products ==
The company's primary product was Altamira Composer. This PC based software pioneered object-based drawing and image editing. Composer was one of the first to bring important tools such as anti-aliased effects and image sprites to the desktop.

Altamira Composer, one of the first image composition applications with image sprites (i.e., non-rectangular, floating images), entered the market in November 1993 (CoSA After Effects 1.0 shipped in January of that same year).
