= Alvy Ray Smith =

American filmmaker, Pixar co-founder (born 1943)

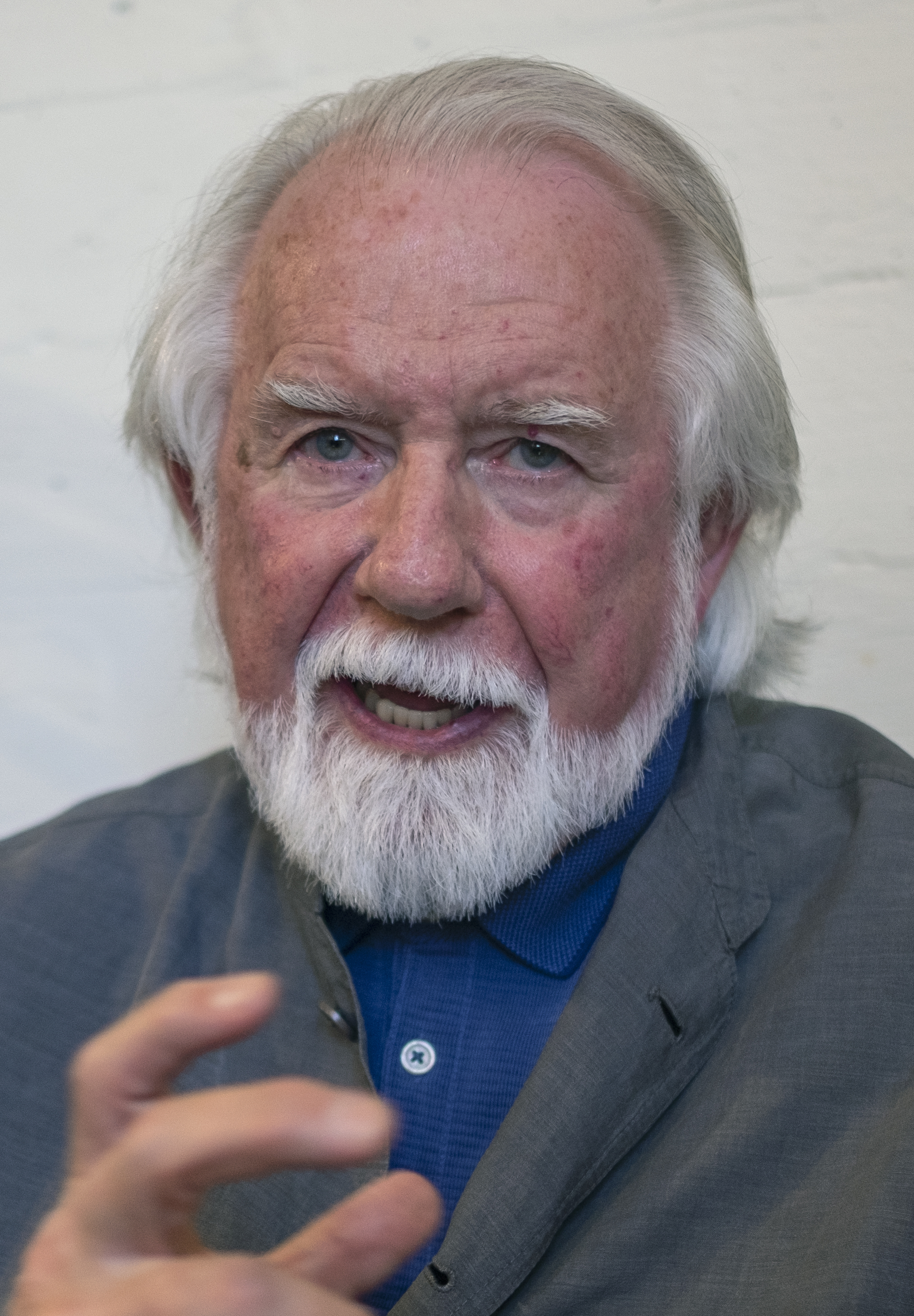
- Smith in 2019
- Born: Alvy Ray Smith III; September 8, 1943 (age 83); Mineral Wells, Texas, U.S.
- Education: New Mexico State University (B.S.E.E., 1965); Stanford University (M.S., 1966, Ph.D., 1970)
- Known for: Pixar co-founder, Sunstone, Genesis Demo in The Wrath of Khan, The Adventures of André & Wally B., alpha channel, HSV color space, first RGB paint program
- Spouse: Alison Gopnik (m. 2010)
- Website: alvyray.com

Alvy Ray Smith III (born September 8, 1943) is an American computer scientist who co-founded Lucasfilm's Computer Division and Pixar, participating in the 1980s and 1990s expansion of computer animation into feature film.

He is one of the 50 Fellows of the American Society of Genealogists.

== Early life and education ==
Smith was born in Mineral Wells, Texas, and spent his childhood in New Mexico. He showed an early aptitude for mathematics and a deep interest in art, inspired by his uncle, a professional artist, who taught him how to oil paint. Smith was introduced to computer programming by a visiting scientist from the White Sands Missile Range.

In 1965, Alvy Smith received his bachelor's degree in electrical engineering from New Mexico State University (NMSU). He created his first computer graphic in 1965 at NMSU. In 1970, he received a Ph.D. in computer science from Stanford University, with a dissertation on cellular automata theory jointly supervised by Michael A. Arbib, Edward J. McCluskey, and Bernard Widrow.

== Career ==
His first art show was at the Stanford Coffeehouse. From 1969 to 1973, he was an associate professor of Electrical Engineering and Computer Science at New York University, under chairman Herbert Freeman, one of the earliest computer graphics researchers. He taught briefly at the University of California, Berkeley in 1974.

In 1972 a skiing accident forced him into a period of introspection. During his recovery, he resolved to merge his passions for art and technology. In 1974, he joined the Xerox Palo Alto Research Center (PARC), where he worked on SuperPaint, the first interactive color graphics program. This experience introduced him to digital light and inspired his commitment to computer graphics. Smith's major contribution to this software was the creation of the HSV color space. He created his first computer animations on the SuperPaint system.

In 1975, Smith joined the new Computer Graphics Laboratory at New York Institute of Technology (NYIT), where he was given the job title "Information Quanta". There, working alongside a traditional cel animation studio, he met Ed Catmull and several core personnel of Pixar. Smith worked on a series of newer paint programs, including Paint3, the first true-color raster graphics editor. As part of this work he co-invented the concept of the alpha channel. He was also the programmer and collaborator on Ed Emshwiller's animation Sunstone, included in the collection of the Museum of Modern Art in New York. Smith worked at NYIT until 1979 and then briefly at the Jet Propulsion Laboratory with Jim Blinn on the Carl Sagan Cosmos: A Personal Voyage television series.

Smith was a founding member, with Ed Catmull, of the Lucasfilm Computer Division, which developed computer graphics software including early rendering technology. In 1982 Smith directed his Lucasfilm team in the creation of a 3D computer animated sequence, the Genesis Demo, for Paramount’s Star Trek II: The Wrath of Khan, the debut appearance of what would become Pixar on the big screen. In 1984, Smith conceived and directed The Adventures of André and Wally B., a pioneering animated short produced during his tenure at Lucasfilm's Computer Graphics Division. This project demonstrated the potential of computer-generated imagery (CGI) in storytelling, blending advanced technology with creative artistry.

Also in 1979, Ed Catmull arrived at Lucasfilm to establish a new division to develop new technologies for modernizing motion picture creation for George Lucas. Smith joined Catmull in 1980, to lead one of the three new projects for the Lucasfilm Computer Division--the Graphics Group--originally established to replace the archaic optical printer for combining image elements into special effects. In 1981, Smith, Loren Carpenter, Rodney Stock, and Jim Blinn gathered at dinner to name the digital film printer they were developing. They disliked "Difip" and Carpenter was lobbying for "Cinematrix." Smith proposed "Pixer", which sounded scientific, but it evolved through dinner into "Pixar". The group's original hardware product became the "Pixar 2D Frame Buffer." The rendering software developed for it became "Renderman." As director of the Graphics Group, Smith created and directed the "Genesis Demo" in Star Trek II: The Wrath of Khan, and conceived and directed the short animated film The Adventures of André & Wally B., animated by John Lasseter.

Lucasfilm decided to sell the Graphics Group in the mid-1980s; Smith and Catmull convinced Steve Jobs to finance the spin-out, and in February 1986 they became the co-founders of Pixar, Inc. Smith served on the board of directors of the new company and was executive vice president. According to Jeffrey Young and William Simon's Jobs biography, iCon, Alvy Ray quit Pixar in 1991 after a heated argument with Jobs over the use of a whiteboard. Feeling bullied by Jobs, Smith decided to publicly break the unwritten rule that no one else could use Jobs's whiteboard; they ended up screaming at each-other. Despite Smith's role as co-founder of Pixar, Young and Simon claim that the company has largely written him out of its corporate history: for example, there is no mention of Smith on the Pixar website. Pixar released Toy Story in 1995 and then went public, and Steve Jobs returned to Apple in 1997.

From 1988–1992, Smith was a member of the board of regents of the National Library of Medicine in Bethesda, Maryland, where he was instrumental in inaugurating the Visible Human Project.

After leaving Pixar in 1991, Smith cofounded Altamira Software with Eric Lyons and Nicholas Clay. Altamira was acquired by Microsoft in 1994, and Smith became the first Graphics Fellow at Microsoft.

Smith retired from Microsoft in 1999 to spend his time giving talks, making digital photographs, doing scholarly genealogy, and researching technical history. He lives in Seattle, Washington. In 2010, Smith married Alison Gopnik, author and professor of psychology at the University of California, Berkeley.

In 2021, he published A Biography of the Pixel, a historical and technical account of digital imaging that introduces his concept of "Digital Light." The book discusses the scientific and cultural developments leading to what he describes as the "Great Digital Convergence," a period around the year 2000 when digital technologies supplanted traditional analog media.

== Awards ==
With his collaborators, Smith has twice been recognized by the Academy of Motion Picture Arts and Sciences for his scientific and engineering contributions to digital image compositing (1996 award) and digital paint systems (1998 award).

In 1990, Smith and Richard Shoup received the ACM SIGGRAPH Computer Graphics Achievement Award for their development of paint programs. Smith presented the Forsythe Lecture in 1997 at Stanford University, where he received his PhD in 1970. His undergraduate alma mater New Mexico State University awarded him an honorary doctorate in December 1999. He was inducted into the CRN Industry Hall of Fame at the Computer History Museum in Mountain View, CA in 2004. In 2006, Smith was elected a member of the National Academy of Engineering. In 2010, Smith was elected a Fellow of the American Society of Genealogists and presented the Washington Award in Chicago for advancing "the welfare of humankind". In 2011, Smith was awarded the Special Award at Mundos Digitales in La Coruna, Spain, for lifetime achievement in computer graphics. In 2012, Smith was awarded the Digital Media Symposium Lifetime Achievement Award in Boulder, Colorado, and was awarded a plaque in the Circle of Honor at New Mexico State University. In 2013, Smith was elected a fellow of the American Association for the Advancement of Science. Smith has been the recipient of several grants from the National Science Foundation and the National Endowment for the Arts during his career. In May 2022, Smith received an honorary Doctor of Science degree from New York Institute of Technology (where he co-founded the Computer Graphics Laboratory) for his pioneering work in computer animation.

== See also ==
- HWB color model

== Sources ==
- Michael Rubin, Droidmaker: George Lucas and the Digital Revolution (2005) ISBN 0-937404-67-5
- Elio Quiroga, "La Materia de los Sueños", Fundación DMR Consulting, Ediciones Deusto (Spain, 2004) ISBN 84-234-3495-8
- Simon, William L. and Young, Jeffrey S. "iCon: The Greatest Second Act in the History of Business." (2005) ISBN 0-471-72083-6
- David A. Price, "The Pixar Touch: The Making of a Company" (2008) ISBN 978-0-307-26575-3
- Walter Isaacson, "Steve Jobs" (2011) ISBN 978-1-4516-4853-9
