= Vladimir Pokhilko =

Soviet-Russian entrepreneur, video game designer (1954–1998)

- Владимир Похилько
- Born: Vladimir Ivanovich Pokhilko; 8 April 1954; Moscow, Russian SFSR, Soviet Union (now Russia)
- Died: 21 September 1998 (aged 44); Palo Alto, California, US
- Occupations: Entrepreneur, game designer, psychologist
- Years active: 1982–1998

Vladimir Ivanovich Pokhilko (Russian: Владимир Иванович Похилько; 8 April 1954 – 21 September 1998) was a Soviet Russian psychologist, entrepreneur, and video game designer. He was an academic who specialized in human–computer interaction.

== Early life ==
Vladimir Ivanovich Pokhilko was born on 8 April 1954, in Moscow. He graduated from the faculty of psychology at Moscow State University in 1982. He received a PhD in 1985 from the Russian Academy of Science.

He was a junior researcher at the I.M. Sechenov First Moscow State Medical University.

== Psychological experiments using Tetris ==
A friend of Tetris creator Alexey Pajitnov, he was the first clinical psychologist to conduct experiments using the game. He played an important role in the subsequent development and marketing of the game, and a 1999 article in the Forbes magazine credited him for "co-inventing the seminal videogame Tetris". He later collaborated with Pajitnov on the Zombie Studios game Ice & Fire.

== Technology company AnimaTek ==
In 1989, he and Pajitnov founded the 3D software technology company AnimaTek in Moscow. While attempting to create software for INTEC (a company they started) that would be made for "people's souls", they developed the idea for El-Fish, a video game.

== Murder-suicide ==
After experiencing financial difficulties at his software company, AnimaTek, Pokhilko murdered his wife, Elena Fedotova (38) and their son, Peter (12), by bludgeoning and stabbing them both to death in their home in Palo Alto, California. He then killed himself.

The Pokhilko case was investigated by the FBI in 1998, and was the subject of the three part documentary, The Tetris Murders (2022).
