= Knight Moves (video game) =

1995 puzzle video game

- Developer(s): Kinesoft Development Corp.
- Publisher(s): Spectrum Holobyte, Inc.
- Platform(s): PC
- Release: 1995
- Genre(s): Puzzle
- Mode(s): Single-player

Knight Moves is a puzzle video game released for Windows in 1995.

== Gameplay ==
The player controls a chess knight, and must navigate around various hazards and enemies to pick up power-ups and treasure.

== Reception ==
Next Generation reviewed the PC version of the game, rating it two stars out of five, and stated that "Coupled with a set of frustratingly difficult levels early on, Knight Moves almost seems made to disappoint puzzle gamers."

Brad Cook of AllGame found that the graphics and sound to be well done, but said the game was too difficult as the knight would jump anywhere you placed the mouse.
