= Eric Tolt =

American classic Tetris player

EricICX
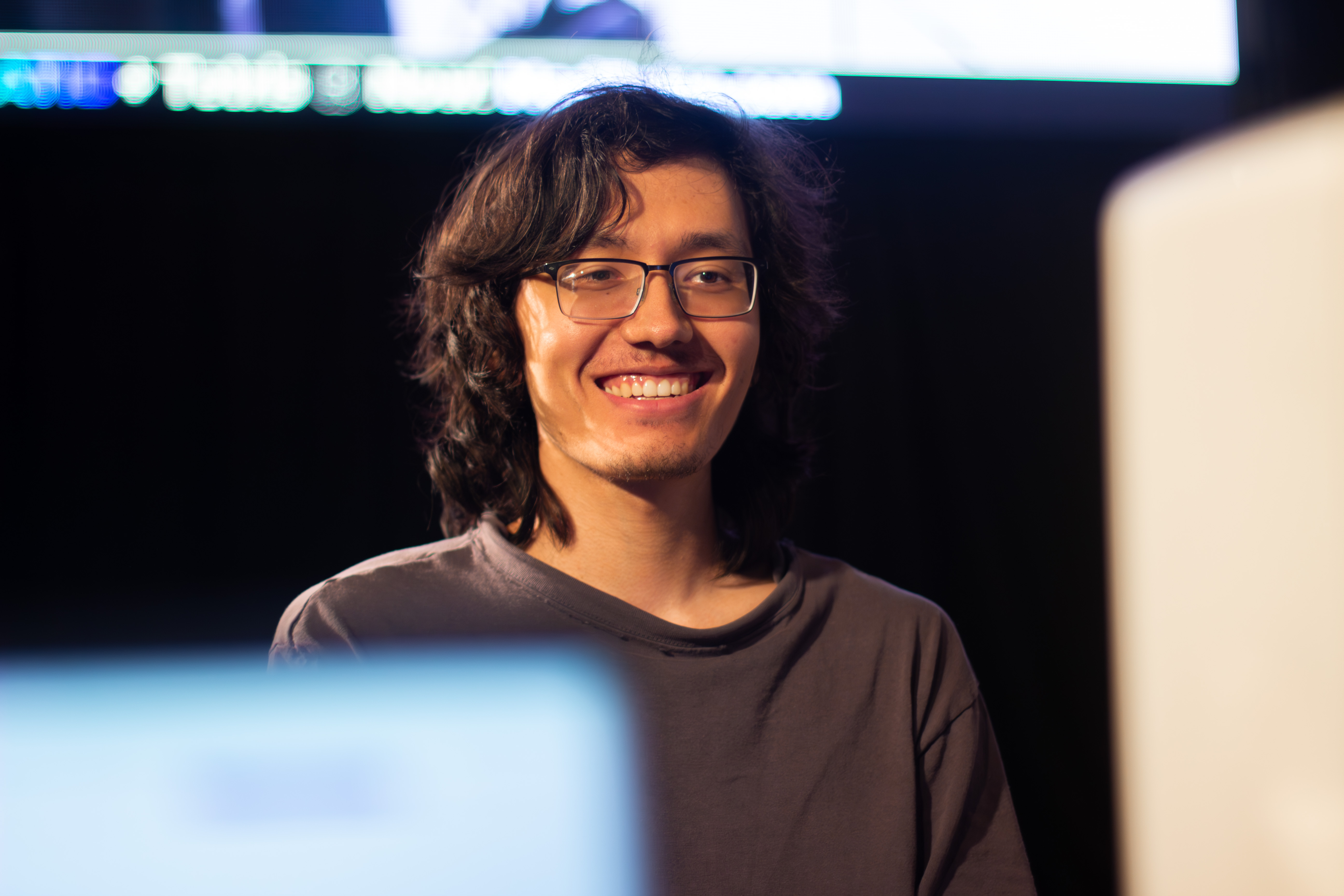
- Tolt during the 2024 Classic Tetris World Championship

Personal information
- Name: Eric Tolt

Career information
- Games: Classic Tetris
- Playing career: 2019–present

Career highlights and awards
- 1× World Championship winner (2022); 1× Honda Fan Cup runner-up (2022); 2× Regionals winner (2021, 2022); 1× Masters winner (2020); Highest winning score record (2022)

Eric Tolt, known online as EricICX, is an American classic NES Tetris player from the U.S. state of Pennsylvania. He is known for winning the 2022 Classic Tetris World Championship (CTWC), earning the highest winning score record, being the first person to reach levels 37, 38, 95, and 146, and being the first person to reach the glitched colors on the NTSC version of the game after Justin Yu had done so on the slower PAL version of the game.

Tolt became interested in the game around 2018 and began to play competitively by late 2019. He began to achieve a number of records, and competed in the 2020 and 2021 CTWC's. During the August 2022 Classic Tetris Monthly tournament, Tolt achieved the record for the highest winning score and was the first to reach level 146: the first glitched color level of the game caused by a glitch at very high levels. Two months later, Tolt won the 2022 CTWC after defeating the following year's winner, Justin Yu, in the finals. Since the 2023 CTWC, Tolt has largely stepped back from competitive play, but has remained active in the Tetris community and on YouTube. A number of his achievements were highlighted as important stepping stones leading up to the eventual "beating of the game" on December 21, 2023, by fellow Tetris player Willis Gibson.

== Tetris career ==
Eric Tolt, known online as EricICX, lives in the U.S. state of Pennsylvania, and in 2025 was a college student according to his YouTube channel description. He became interested in classic NES Tetris in 2018 after watching videos of the Classic Tetris World Championship (CTWC) finals online, particularly the most recent championship from 2017. He then began to play causally starting in mid-2018, and more competitively by late 2019. Shortly after becoming competitive, Tolt began to achieve a number of records: including being the first person to achieve a "maxout" on the PAL version of Tetris, a point in the game where the score becomes so high that it no longer registers correctly on-screen, in November 2019, and being the first person to reach levels 37 and 38 of the game in 2020. In regards to major competitions, Tolt competed in his first CTWC in 2020 where he finished in the top 24. The following year, Tolt competed in the 2021 CTWC where he placed in the top 32.

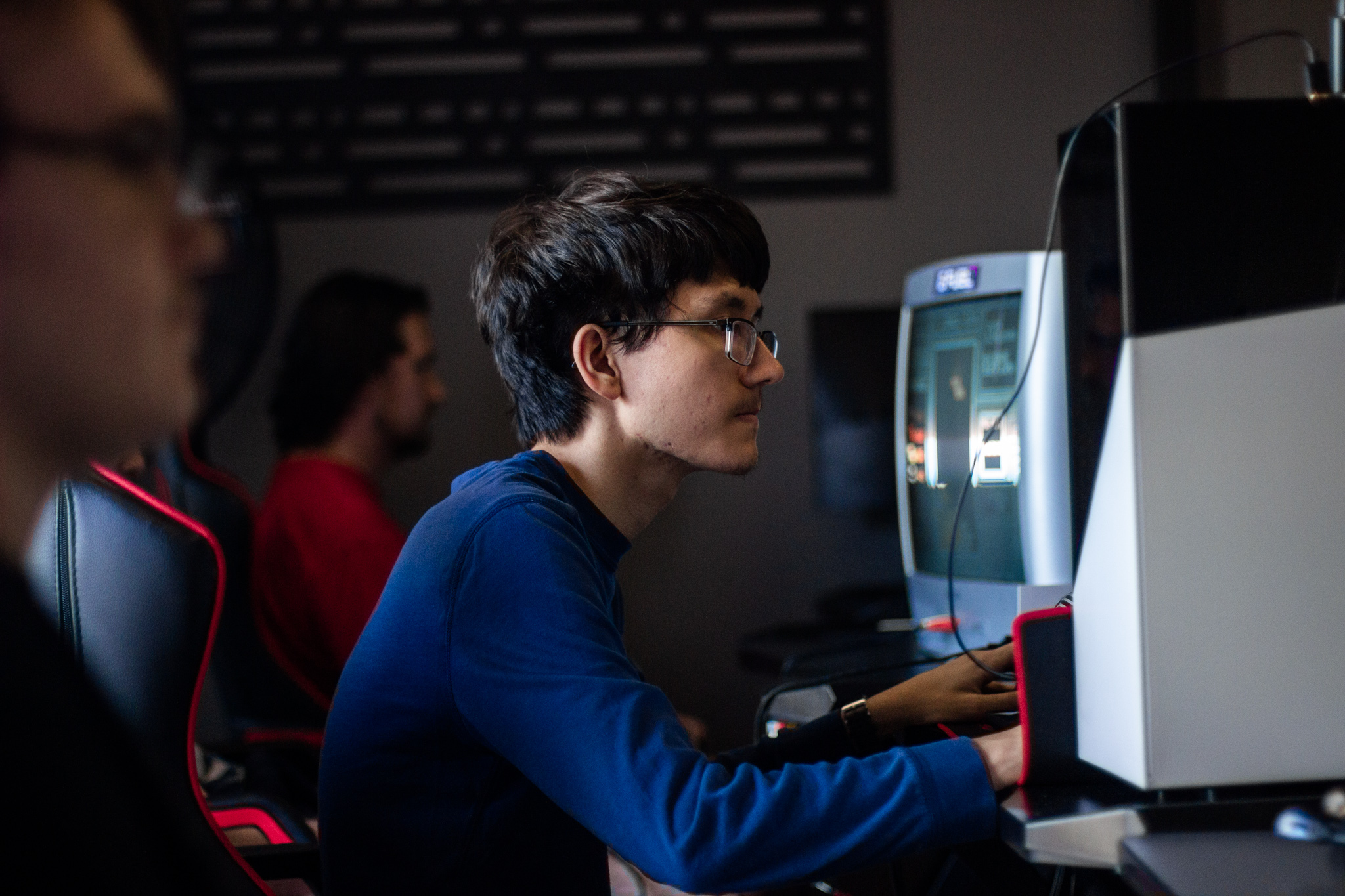
Tolt during the 2022 East Coast Regional, an event he later won

Following the 2021 CTWC and leading up to the 2022 CTWC, Tolt achieved two additional high score records: including being the first person to achieve a three million point score in April (breaking the previous record by 1.4 million points), and the record for highest winning score at 6,492,500 points in August. The latter achievement took place during the August 2022 Classic Tetris Monthly (CTM) tournament, breaking the previous record set by Andrew Artiaga (known online as "P1xelAndy") three months prior by over 4.3 million points. During the same tournament Tolt also became the first person to reach level 146, the first glitched color level on the NTSC version of Tetris, where the color pallet becomes dim due to a glitch in the code, making it difficult to recognize the block shapes. On September 27, 2022, Tolt broke the world record for fastest time to beat the game mode "Shirase" in Tetris: The Grand Master 3 – Terror‑Instinct, a game mode in which the pieces speed up as you continue to play, with a time of 4:05:30. Tolt's record, which he referred to as his most proud achievement to date, marked the first time in 13 years the record had been broken, with the previous record of 4:09:16 being made by a player with the online name "ZAB".

From October 14–16, 2022, Tolt competed in the 2022 CTWC. In the qualifying rounds on October 14, Tolt achieved 14 maxouts alongside Justin Yu (known online as "Fractal"). But because Tolt's highest non-maxout score during the qualifier was lower than Yu's, he was placed in the #2 seed. After earning a bye due to his high seed, Tolt worked his way up to the semifinals, where he defeated the two-time and most recent CTWC champion Michael Artiaga (known online as "Dogplayingtetris") 3–0 in a series of games. In the finals, Tolt defeated Justin Yu 3–1, with the third game being the first in which both players reached two million points in a CTWC match. During the entire championship, Tolt only lost two games. The win made Tolt the fifth individual to win the CTWC since it began in 2010.

Tolt has largely stepped back from competitive Tetris scene since the 2023 CTWC, (Note: Since the 2023 CTWC, Tolt only competed in two events in 2024, and two in 2025 (see the Competetive record section for more details).) but has remained active on YouTube: creating an analysis video on Willis Gibson (known online as "Blue Scuti") after he became the first person to "beat the game" on December 21, 2023. Upon Gibson "beating the game", a number of sources including the American tech website Ars Technica, Philippine broadcaster GMA Network, and Canadian publisher TheGamer, highlighted Tolt's achievements as important stepping stones leading up to the event.

== Playing style ==
During his early Tetris career and his 2020 and 2021 CTWC's, Tolt used a playing style called hypertapping which emphasizes vibrating the buttons rapidly over pressing them; a technique first popularized by Saelee in his winning 2018 CTWC tournament. After the 2021 CTWC, however, Tolt began to use another technique called rolling, a new technique created by fellow Tetris player Christopher Martinez (known online as "CheeZ") before the 2020 CTWC, which involves rolling the back of the controller with all five fingers to position the game pieces more quickly. He has since used this technique to achieve various records, including the first three million point score, first to reach the glitched colors levels, and to win the 2022 CTWC. During his winning 2022 CTWC, Tolt's strategy revolved around outlasting his opponents after the reaching the "killscreen" at level 29, in which the game pieces begin to fall at their maximum speed. In a post-game interview after defeating the two-time and most recent CTWC champion in the semi-finals with this strategy, Tolt commented that victory can be achieved because "everybody makes mistakes eventually".

== Competitive record ==
This table lists notable Classic Tetris tournaments in which Tolt competed and their outcomes. It includes any appearances at events related to CTWC or CTM. CTM results prior to 2022 list only the winner and runner-up, and information may be incomplete.

Competitive record of Eric Tolt in Classic Tetris
Year	Tournament	Size	Seed	Score	Place	Ref.
2020	CTM May Masters	N/A	N/A	N/A	2nd	
2020	CTM August Masters	N/A	N/A	N/A	1st	
2020	Classic Tetris World Championship (Note: Held online due to COVID-19 pandemic.)	64	3	2-2	17th–24th	
2021	CTM March Challengers	N/A	N/A	N/A	1st	
2021	CTWC New York (Note: "CTWC B14NK's Garage".)	8	1	3–0	1st	
2021	CTM July Masters	N/A	N/A	N/A	2nd	
2021	Classic Tetris World Championship	64	11	2-2	25th–32nd	
2022	CTM March Masters	16	8	0–1	9th–16th	
2022	CTM April Mega Masters	32	2	1–1	9th–16th	
2022	CTM May Masters	16	1	1–1	5th–8th	
2022	CTM June Masters	16	1	3–1	2nd	
2022	CTWC New York (Note: "CTWC East Coast".)	8	2	4–0	1st	
2022	CTM July Masters	16	10	1–1	5th–8th	
2022	CTWC Ohio (Note: "WPL Championship".)	36	2^{†}	4–1	2nd	
2022	CTM August Masters	16	14	2–1	3rd–4th	
2022	CTM September Masters	16	5	2–1	3rd–4th	
2022	CTWC Honda Fan Cup Qualifier #2 (Note: "Classic Score Attack" mode in Tetris Effect: Connected was used instead of NES hardware.)	91	4^{†}	6–2	2nd	
2022	Classic Tetris World Championship	48	2^{†}	5–0	1st	
2022	CTWC Honda Fan Cup Finale	8	1	3–1	2nd	
2022	CTM November Masters	16	6	1–1	5th–8th	
2022	CTM December Masters	16	6	1–1	5th–8th	
2023	CTWC New Jersey (Note: "CTWC Jersey Shore")	8	2	1–1	3rd–4th	
2023	CTM January Masters	16	7	1–1	5th–8th	
2023	CTM February Masters	16	6	2–1	3rd–4th	
2023	CTM March Masters	16	1	1–1	5th–8th	
2023	CTM May Masters	16	7	2–1	3rd–4th	
2023	CTWC New York	10	1^{†}	1–1	3rd–4th	
2023	CTM June Masters	16	2	3–1	2nd	
2023	CTM Lone Star (Note: CTM Texas regional, held in-person.)	24	24	0–1	17th–24th	
2023	CTWC Ohio	32	13^{†}	3–1	5th–8th	
2023	CTWC Connecticut (Note: "CTWC Northeast")	12	8	1–1	5th–8th	
2023	Classic Tetris World Championship	48	48	0–1	33rd–48th	
2024	CTM March Mega Masters	64	49	0–1	33rd–64th	
2024	Classic Tetris World Championship	48	31	1–1	17th–32nd	
2025	Classic Tetris World Championship	48	46	0–1	33rd–48th	
2025	CTM July TAP Masters	32	12^{†}	1–1	9th–16th	

Event host
CTWC	Classic Tetris World Championship	held in-person (Note: Unless indicated otherwise by a footnote.)
CTM	Classic Tetris Monthly	held online

Default wins
^{†}	single-dagger symbol	high seed after qualifying round, awarding a single bye
^{‡}	double-dagger symbol	high seed after qualifying round, awarding a double bye
