= Koryan =

Koryan may refer to:

== People ==
- Koji Nishio, a Japanese Tetris player
- Ruslan Koryan, an Armenian professional footballer
- Arshak Koryan, a Russian professional footballer
