= Justin Yu =

Tetris player from Texas

Fractal161
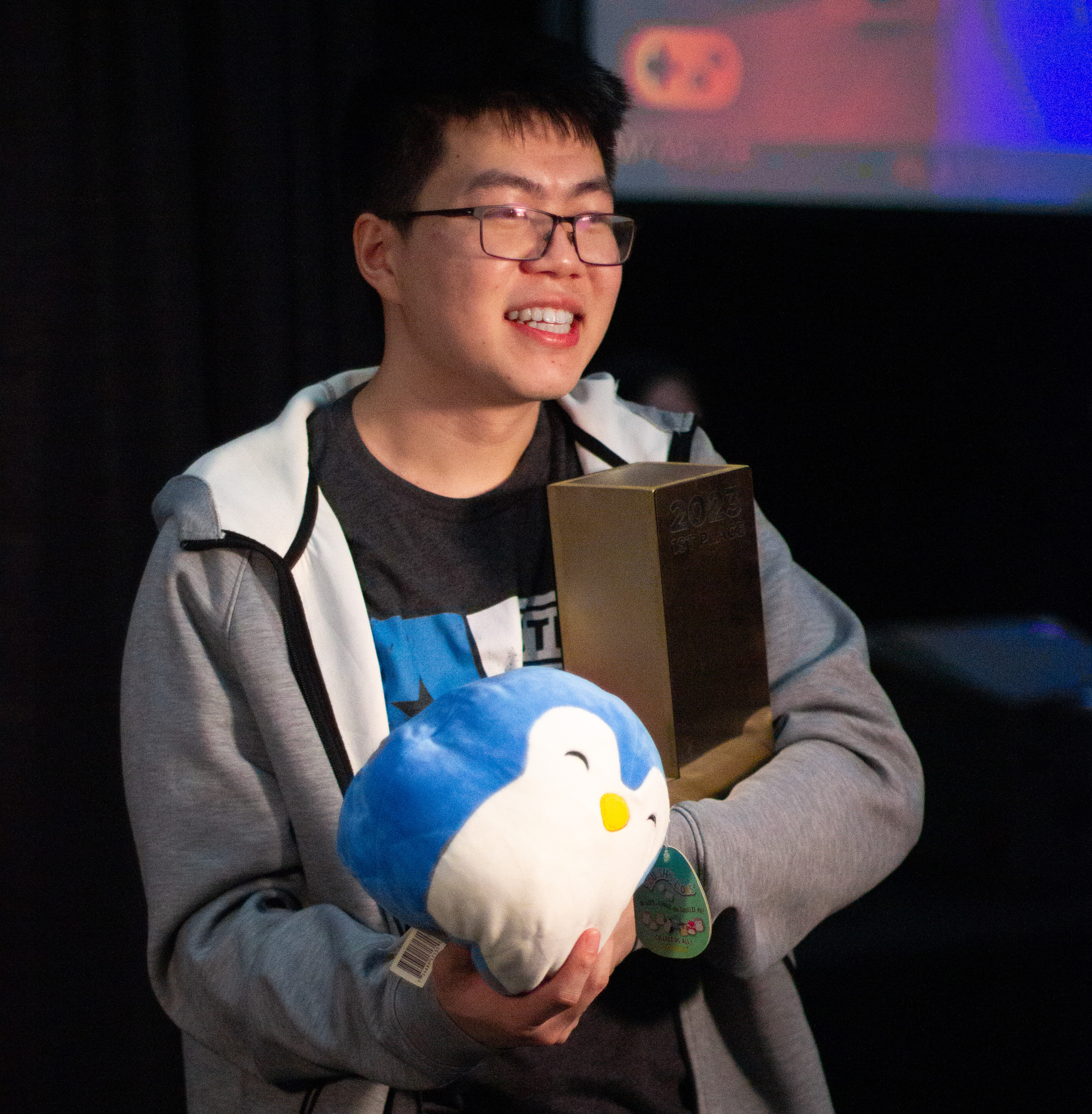
- Yu after winning the 2023 Classic Tetris World Championship

Personal information
- Name: Justin Yu
- Born: 2000 or 2001 (age 25–26) (Note: While no exact date is given, Yu was 22 years old on November 3, 2023.)

Career information
- Games: Classic Tetris
- Playing career: c. 2016–present

Career highlights and awards
- 1× World Championship winner (2023); 1× World Championship runner-up (2022); 1× DAS World Cup runner-up (2026); 1× DAS Jonas Cup winner (2024); 1× DAS Jonas Cup runner-up (2025); 4× Regional winner (2022–2025); 9× Masters winner (2021–2024); Second to "beat" NES Tetris (2024)

Justin Yu, known online as Fractal161, is an American classic Tetris player from Dallas, Texas. He is best known for his victory in the 2023 Classic Tetris World Championship (CTWC), for becoming the first person to reach the glitched colors on the slower PAL version of the game, for becoming the second person to "beat the game", and first to achieve its earliest possible game crash on January 3, 2024.

Beginning to play Tetris around 2016, Yu entered the competitive scene around 2019, and was one of the first players to fully adopt a new and faster playing style called "rolling". Through repeated practice and by studying the game's programming assembly, Yu finished as the runner-up in the 2022 CTWC and won the 2023 CTWC while also a Junior at the Massachusetts Institute of Technology (MIT). After winning the CTWC, Yu focused on becoming the first person to "beat" Tetris, but was beaten to his end goal by fellow competitive Tetris player Willis Gibson (known online as "Blue Scuti") on December 21, 2023. A few weeks later, Yu became the first player to achieve the earliest possible game crash. He has stated his desire to one day run Tetris websites and tournaments of his own.

== Personal life and education ==
Yu is from Dallas, Texas. In high school, Yu participated in a number of math competitions, including competing for the winning team in the 2016 Mathcounts National Competition, helping him to get accepted into the Massachusetts Institute of Technology (MIT) with a major in computer science and engineering. At MIT, Yu pursued another major in mathematics, with a minor in music technology, and is set to graduate in 2025. Yu also plays the cello in the MIT Video Game Orchestra, an orchestra at the school which performs covers of classic video game music. Yu has stated he places the Video Game Orchestra and other school commitments above practicing Tetris.

Yu has stated his future goal is to one day help run Tetris websites and tournaments as opposed to competing in them, believing the large effort needed to run them often goes unnoticed.

== Tetris career ==
Yu began to play the original NES Tetris around 2016, becoming interested after watching videos of the game on YouTube, but never playing for more than an hour at a time. He began to pursue the game more competitively around 2019, playing in three to four hour sessions, where he often practiced to optimize his strategy. To get a better understanding of the game, Yu began to experiment in programming assembly and ROM hacking, which helped him to become the first person to reach Tetris's late-game glitched color levels, and in his major at MIT. In the 2022 CTWC, Yu finished in second after losing to Eric Tolt (known online as "EricICX") in the finals. As a Junior in college, Yu again competed in the CTWC from October 13 to 15, 2023, where he beat fellow competitor Eve Commandeur (known online as "Sidnev") to place first, winning over US$3,000.

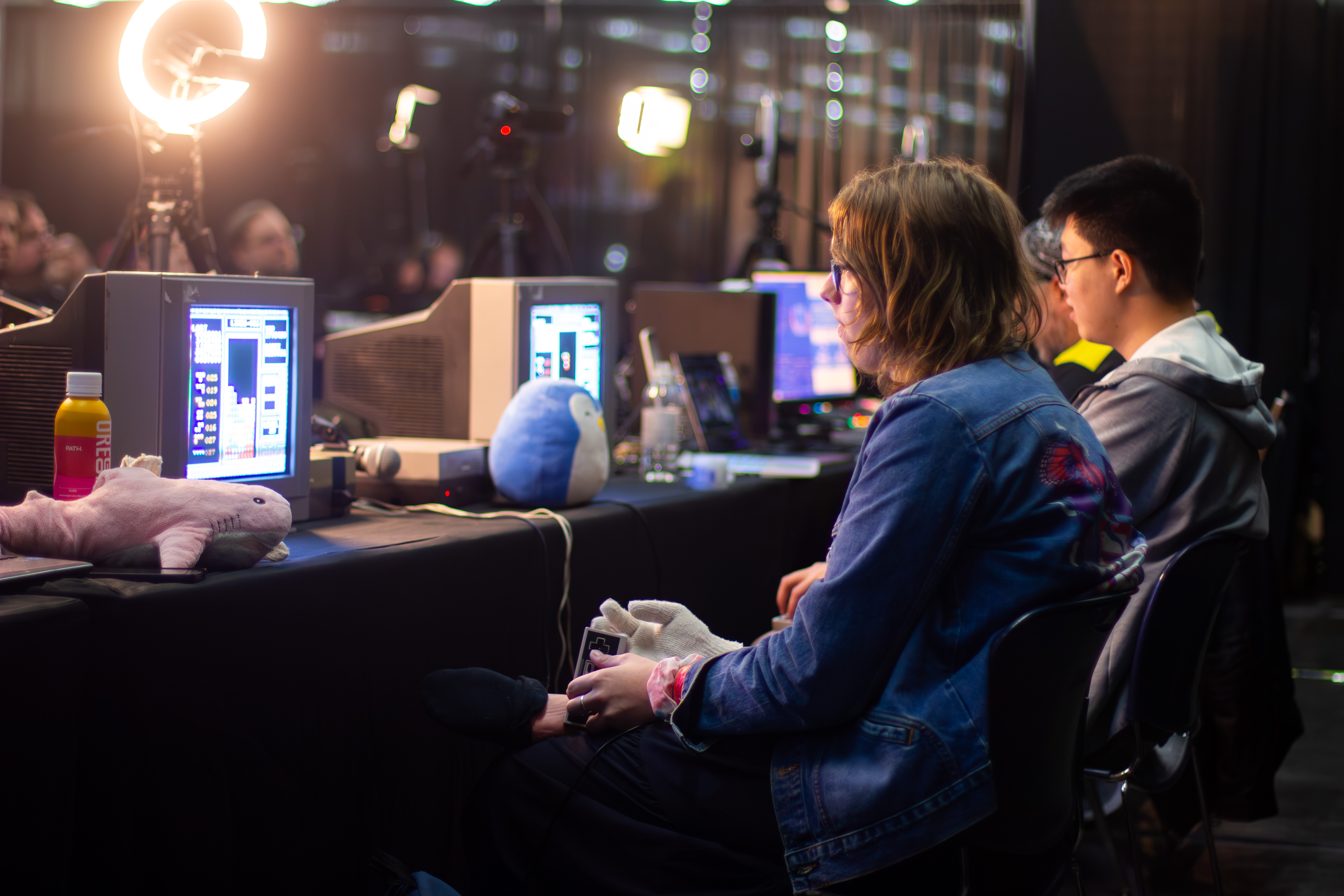
Yu playing against Eve Commandeur ("Sidnev") in the 2023 CTWC Finals

After the 2023 CTWC, Yu announced his intentions to try to "beat the game", a point late in the game when its code glitches and displays a game crash due to hardware limitations within the Nintendo Entertainment System (NES). Fellow competitive Tetris player and YouTuber Willis Gibson (known online as "Blue Scuti") became inspired by this goal and competed against Yu for over two months to become the first to the achievement. Yu particularly struggled with a level nicknamed "dusk", which he described as "so incredibly dark that I felt as if I'd been blinded for a split second." While fixing the issue by purchasing a universal remote which increased his TV's brightness, Yu learned Gibson was close to crashing the game, and watched his livestream where Gibson ultimately "beat the game" on December 21, 2023. Yu celebrated the achievement with Gibson, exclaiming "He did it, he did it!" on his own livestream. Yu continued to work towards the goal, and on another livestream on January 3, 2024, he beat the game, becoming the second person to do so after Gibson and first person to achieve the earliest possible game crash on level 155, two levels quicker than on Gibson's run. After the large amount of media coverage that came from beating the game, Yu argued he did not want the message to read as "We've finished up!" to potential new players, when other achievements such as the "perfect Tetris game" consisting of only the highest scoring line-clears called "tetrises", and "rebirth", playing the same so long it restarts at level one, had both yet to be done.

In early 2024, Yu hosted his own Tetris event at MIT, given the tongue-in-cheek name "Boston T Parity", which only through word of mouth had between fifty to sixty attendees. From June 7–9, 2024, Yu competed in the Classic Tetris World Championship, where he was eliminated in the round of 16 by Tristan Kwai (known online as "Tristop"), who went on to win third place. From June 6–8, 2025, Yu again competed in the Classic Tetris World Championship. Yu was again eliminated in the round of 16, this time losing to Willis Gibson, who in turn lost his semifinals match to the eventual champion Alex Thach (known online as "Alex T").

== Playing style ==
Shortly after Yu began to play competitively, he was among the first to change their playing style to "rolling", a technique which involves rolling the back of the controller with all five fingers to position the game pieces more quickly. This became crucial to beating later levels of the game and to staying competitive in modern tournaments. In a February 2024 interview with the newspaper The Tech, Yu stated his strategy revolved less around making "the board look as nice as possible", and trying to focus on completing tetrises.

== Competitive record ==
This table lists notable Classic Tetris tournaments in which Yu competed in and their outcomes. It includes any appearances at the CTWC World Championship, CTWC DAS Jonas Cup, CTWC DAS World Cup, CTM Mega Masters, as well as high placings at related tournaments, such as reaching at least semifinals in other CTWC or CTM events. CTM results prior to 2022 only list the winner and runner-up, and information may be incomplete.

Competitive record of Justin Yu in Classic Tetris
Year	Tournament	Size	Seed	Score	Place	Ref.
2020	CTM April Challengers	N/A	N/A	N/A	2nd	
2020	CTM August Futures	N/A	N/A	N/A	1st	
2021	CTM April Challengers	16	6	3–1	2nd	
2021	CTM June Challengers	16	6	4–0	1st	
2021	CTM August Masters	16	1	4–0	1st	
2021	CTWC World Championship (Note: held online due to COVID-19 pandemic)	64	4	3–2	9th–16th	
2021	CTWC European Championship	32	1	5–2	2nd	
2022	CTM April Mega Masters	32	10	5–0	1st	
2022	CTM May Masters	16	4	2–1	3rd–4th	
2022	CTM June Masters	16	4	2–1	3rd–4th	
2022	CTWC Lone Star (Note: jointly hosted by CTWC & CTM in 2022 only)	12	2^{†}	3–0	1st	
2022	CTM July Masters	16	11	4–0	1st	
2022	CTM August Masters	16	1	4–0	1st	
2022	CTM September Masters	16	2	2–1	3rd–4th	
2022	CTWC World Championship	48	1^{†}	4–1	2nd	
2022	CTM November Masters	16	1	2–1	3rd–4th	
2023	CTM April Mega Masters	78	7^{†}	2–1	9th–16th	
2023	CTM June PAL (Note: using the PAL version instead of the NTSC standard)	17	4^{†}	7–2	2nd	
2023	CTM Lone Star DAS (Note: "National DAS Championship 2023", held in-person, CTM Texas regional)	12	8	3–1	2nd	
2023	CTWC World Championship	48	3^{†}	5–0	1st	
2023	CTM October Masters (Note: "Faster Masters", level 19 starts only)	16	4	4–0	1st	
2023	CTM November Masters (Note: "No Cap November", level 39 super killscreen disabled)	16	2	3–1	2nd	
2023	CTM December Masters	16	6	2–1	3rd–4th	
2024	CTWC Boston (Note: "Boston T Parity", hosted by Yu himself)	12	1^{†}	1–1	3rd–4th	
2024	CTM January Masters	16	3	4–0	1st	
2024	CTWC Genesis (Note: hosted concurrently with the Super Smash Bros. tournament of the same name)	12	1^{†}	3–0	1st	
2024	CTM February Masters	16	1	4–0	1st	
2024	CTM March Mega Masters	64	5	6–0	1st	
2024	CTWC World Championship	48	9^{†}	1–1	9th–16th	
2024	CTM July DAS Masters	16	1	2–1	3rd–4th	
2024	CTWC Minneapolis (Note: "MinneD")	12	2^{†}	3–0	1st	
2024	CTM September Challengers	16	5	4–0	1st	
2024	CTWC DAS Jonas Cup (Note: in memory of Jonas Neubauer)	48	6^{†}	5–0	1st	
2024	CTM October DAS Masters	32	3^{‡}	2–1	3rd–4th	
2025	CTWC Genesis DAS	16	1	4–0	1st	
2025	CTWC Genesis	16	2	2–2	4th	
2025	CTM March Masters	32	6^{‡}	3–1	2nd	
2025	CTM March DAS Masters	32	13^{†}	3–1	3rd–4th	
2025	CTM April Mega Masters	64	5^{‡}	2–1	5th–8th	
2025	CTWC World Championship	48	5^{†}	1–1	9th–16th	
2025	CTWC DAS World Cup (Note: "CTWC DAS: The World Cup of DAS", held in Cologne, Germany)	48	2^{‡}	2–2	5th–6th	
2025	CTWC Houston DAS (Note: "Space City")	15	6	2–1	3rd–4th	
2025	CTWC Minneapolis (Note: aka "MinneD")	16	3	3–1	2nd	
2025	CTWC DAS Jonas Cup	48	7^{†}	4–1	2nd	
2025	CTM October DAS Mega Masters	64	3^{‡}	4–1	3rd	
2026	CTWC Washington State	12	4^{†}	2–1	3rd–4th	
2026	CTWC Genesis DAS	32	4	2–1	3rd	
2026	CTWC Genesis	16	6	1–1	5th–8th	
2026	CTWC World Championship	48	18	2–1	9th–16th	
2026	CTWC DAS World Cup (Note: "CTWC DAS: The World Cup of DAS", held in Manchester, England)	48	1^{‡}	4–1	2nd	

Event host
CTWC	Classic Tetris World Championship	held in-person (Note: unless indicated otherwise by a footnote)
CTM	Classic Tetris Monthly	held online

Default wins
^{†}	single-dagger symbol	high seed after qualifying round, awarding a single bye
^{‡}	double-dagger symbol	high seed after qualifying round, awarding a double bye
