= Andrew Artiaga =

Tetris player from Texas (born 2005)

P1xelAndy
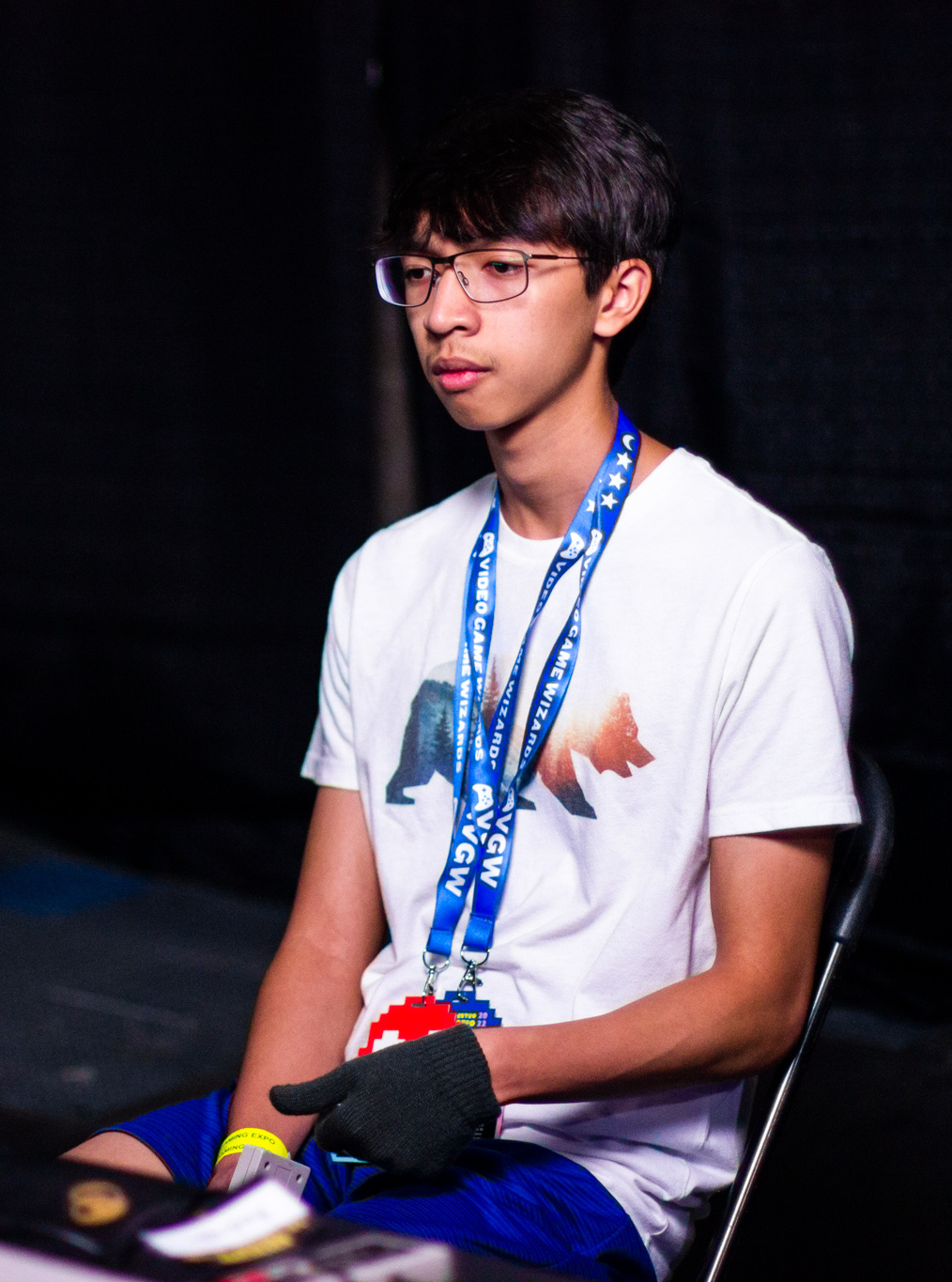
- Artiaga competing in the 2022 Classic Tetris World Championship qualifying round

Personal information
- Name: Andrew Artiaga
- Born: August 5, 2005 (age 21)

Career information
- Games: Classic Tetris
- Playing career: 2018–present

Career highlights and awards
- 1× World Championship runner-up (2020); 2× World Championship semifinalist (2021, 2022); 1× DAS World Cup winner (2026); 1× DAS World Cup runner-up (2025); 2× DAS Jonas Cup winner (2025, 2026); 1× DAS Jonas Cup semifinalist (2024); 2× Regional winner (2023, 2024); 1× DAS Regional winner (2026); 5× Masters winner (2021–2025); 13× DAS Masters winner (2024–2026); 2× STM Masters winner (2026); Third to "beat" NES Tetris (2024)

Andrew Artiaga (born August 5, 2005), known online as P1xelAndy, is an American Tetris player from Texas. He is best known for placing second in the 2020 Classic Tetris World Championships (CTWC) and third in the 2022 CTWC. In 2024, Artiaga also became the third player to "beat the game" by triggering a game crash. Seven days later, Artiaga further broke the high score record for the game by around two million points, for which he was recognized by Guinness World Records.

From a young age, Andrew and his younger brother Michael Artiaga experimented with coding, computing, and gaming, with their father being a web developer. Practicing Tetris occasionally on their Game Boy at home, both brothers were inspired to pursue the game further after 16-year-old Joseph Saelee's victory against the 37-year-old and previous champion Jonas Neubauer on YouTube in the 2018 CTWC, marking the beginning of a new generation of Tetris players in the competitive scene. Artiaga has since placed second in the 2020 CTWC, where he lost against his brother, third in the 2022 CTWC, and became the third player to "beat the game" by triggering a game crash on January 4, 2024, only days after it was done for the first time.

After setting the high-score record in 2024, Artiaga has achieved several distinctions in competitive Delayed Auto Shift (DAS) Tetris. In 2025, he won the DAS Jonas Cup. In 2026, he won the DAS World Cup, becoming the first player to win both titles and hold them simultaneously. Later that year, he successfully defended his Jonas Cup title, becoming the competition's first back-to-back champion.

== Personal life and upbringing ==
Andrew was born on August 5, 2005, to Van and Randall Artiaga, and is from Fort Worth, Texas. He and his younger brother Michael Artiaga grew up around electronics, as their father was a web developer. Artiaga further learned to experiment in computing, coding, and gaming in elementary school. He also practiced the skills he learned with his brother by creating characters and music for several of their father's gaming apps.

== Tetris career ==
Artiaga was introduced to Tetris' alongside his brother in elementary school, after playing it on their dad's original Game Boy at home. Both him and his brother at 13 and 10 years old, respectively, began to play the game more intently after watching 16-year-old Joseph Saelee's victory against the 37-year-old and previous champion Jonas Neubauer on YouTube in the 2018 Classic Tetris World Championship (CTWC), marking the beginning of a new generation of Tetris players to the competitive scene. Both brothers practiced more on separate Nintendo consoles at their home, and they collaborated on their shortcomings to better their playing. After purchasing twin famiclones, Andrew began to compete in tournaments under the name "P1xelAndy", while his brother Michael adopted the name "dogplayingtetris" or simply "Dog".

During the COVID-19 lockdowns in the United States, both brothers began to practice more often while also learning from their competitors on Twitch. At 15 and 13 years old, respectively, both Andrew and his brother qualified for the 2020 CTWC, with Andrew obtaining the top seed in his double-elimination playoffs group after scoring one million points in six games. Andrew made it to the semi-finals, where he won against fellow competitor Nenu Kariko to make it to the finals. In the finals, Andrew was placed against his brother Michael, where they competed against each other in the same house due to COVID-19 restrictions preventing them from playing at a large venue. He placed second to his brother shortly after reaching level 29, but he celebrated the achievement with him by giving him a high five immediately after the match's conclusion.

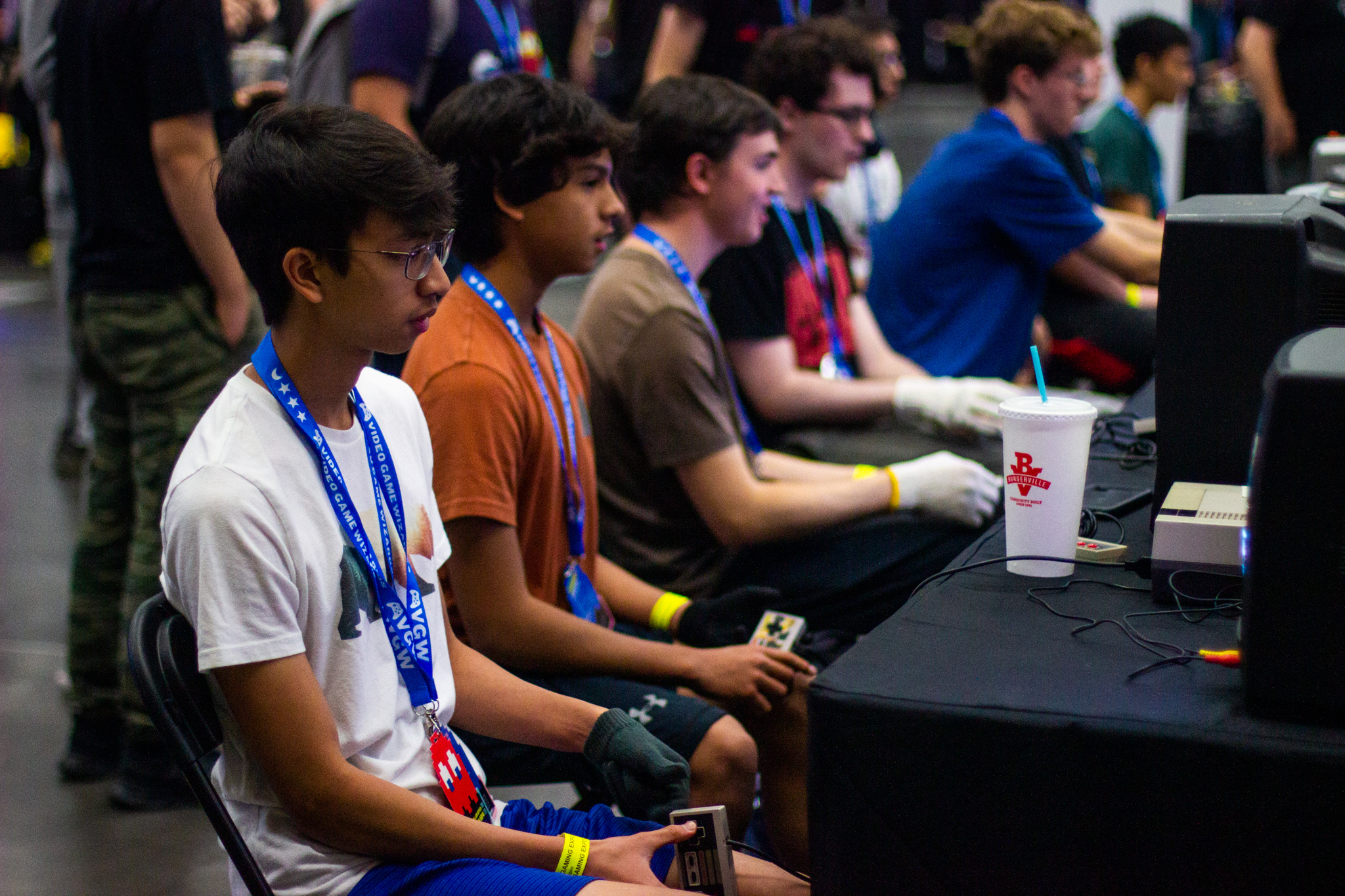
Andrew (closest to the camera) and his brother Michael (second closest) competing at the 2022 CTWC

In the 2021 CTWC, Artiaga placed second in his seed after achieving eleven "maxouts", a point in the game where the score becomes so high that it no longer registers correctly on-screen, in his qualifying rounds. In the semi-finals, Artiaga lost to his brother, Michael, who went on to place first in the CTWC again, ultimately finishing in fourth behind his original inspiration for the game, Joseph Saelee. In the lead-up to the 2022 CTWC, Artiaga broke the world record for the highest winning score in a single game at 2.1 million points during a monthly competition in May. In the 2022 CTWC, Artiaga placed fourth in his qualifying seed after achieving 13 maxouts within two hours of playing. He placed third at the end of the championship, beating his brother, who came in fourth. In the 2023 CTWC, Artiaga placed sixth in his qualifying seed, losing in the quarterfinals to Justin Yu (known online as "Fractal161"), who went on to win the championship.

On January 4, 2024, Artiaga became the third player to "beat the game" by triggering a game crash, something which can only occur at very high levels. He did so just days after fellow competitive Tetris players Willis Gibson (known online as "Blue Scuti") and Justin Yu had done so for the first time. Shortly afterward, on January 11, Artiaga broke the record for highest score achieved on NES Tetris, with a total score of 8,952,432 points, later recognized by Guinness World Records. Artiaga's score broke the previous record by around 2 million points, which was regarded by the entertainment website GamesRadar+ as an accomplishment which separated him from his "little brother's shadow". Artiaga held this record for two months until it was surpassed by Alex Thach (known online as "Alex T") on March 11, 2024, with a score of 16,248,080.

From June 7–9, 2024, Artiaga competed in the Classic Tetris World Championship, where he was eliminated in the round of 16 after losing 0–3 to Eve Commandeur (known online as "Sidnev"), the previous year's runner-up. He reached the same stage at the 2025 CTWC, where he lost to Sam Vaughan (known online as "SV").

From October 17–19, 2025, Artiaga competed in the Jonas Neubauer Cup, defeating defending champion Justin Yu in the final to win the tournament. At the 2026 CTWC, Artiaga was again eliminated in the round of 16, losing to Commandeur.

From August 1–2, 2026, Artiaga won the CTWC DAS World Cup, defeating Justin Yu 4–1 in the final. He became the first player to win both the Jonas Neubauer Cup and the CTWC DAS World Cup. Later in 2026, Artiaga successfully defended his Jonas Neubauer Cup title, sweeping Willis Gibson 3–0 in the final. With the victory, he became the competition's first back-to-back champion.

=== Playing style ===
Artiaga began his Tetris career as a Delayed Auto Shift (DAS) player, which involved shifting falling pieces repeatedly while holding the buttons to increase the speed the pieces are turned. Before the 2020 CTWC, however, Artiaga adopted hypertapping, a playing technique popularized by Saelee in the 2018 CTWC, which emphasizes vibrating the buttons rapidly over pressing them. This was done to keep up pace with his brother, who had adopted the technique earlier.

During the 2021 CTWC, Artiaga continued to utilize hypertapping as opposed to rolling, a new technique created by fellow Tetris player Christopher Martinez (known online as "Cheez") before the 2020 CTWC, which involves flicking the back of the controller from behind ("rolling") with as many successive fingers as needed to position the game pieces more quickly. The success of the technique at the championship led to it being adopted by a number of top players, including Artiaga, before the 2022 CTWC.

== Competitive record ==
This table lists notable Classic Tetris tournaments in which Artiaga competed in and their outcomes. It includes any appearances at the CTWC World Championship, CTWC DAS Jonas Cup, CTWC DAS World Cup, CTM Mega Masters, as well as high placings at related tournaments, such as reaching at least semifinals in other CTWC or CTM events. CTM results prior to 2022 only list the winner and runner-up, and information may be incomplete.

Competitive record of Andrew Artiaga in Classic Tetris
Year	Tournament	Size	Seed	Score	Place	Ref.
2020	CTM March Challengers	N/A	N/A	N/A	1st	
2020	CTWC World Championship (Note: held online due to COVID-19 pandemic)	64	6	6–1	2nd	
2021	CTM March Masters	16	14	4–0	1st	
2021	CTWC World Championship	64	2	6–2	3rd–4th	
2022	CTWC Texas (Note: "Southern Qualifier")	12	2^{†}	1–1	3rd–4th	
2022	CTM February Masters	16	1	2–1	3rd–4th	
2022	CTM March Masters	16	6	3–1	2nd	
2022	CTM April Mega Masters	32	3	1–1	9th–16th	
2022	CTM May Masters	16	9	4–0	1st	
2022	CTM June Masters	16	2	4–0	1st	
2022	CTWC Lone Star (Note: jointly hosted by CTWC & CTM in 2022 only)	12	5	3–1	2nd	
2022	CTM July Masters	16	2	2–1	3rd–4th	
2022	CTM August Masters	16	2	3–1	2nd	
2022	CTWC World Championship	48	4^{†}	3–1	3rd–4th	
2022	CTM November Masters	16	4	3–1	2nd	
2023	CTWC Texas (Note: "Heart of Texas")	16	2	4–0	1st	
2023	CTM January Masters	16	16	2–1	3rd–4th	
2023	CTM April Mega Masters	78	8^{†}	3–1	5th–8th	
2023	CTM May Masters (Note: "Faster Masters", level 19 starts only)	16	1	2–1	3rd–4th	
2023	CTM Lone Star DAS (Note: "National DAS Championship 2023", held in-person, CTM Texas regional)	12	2^{†}	1–1	3rd–4th	
2023	CTM Lone Star (Note: held in-person, CTM Texas regional)	24	4^{†}	6–2	2nd	
2023	CTM August Masters	16	6	4–0	1st	
2023	CTWC World Championship	48	6^{†}	2–1	5th–8th	
2023	CTM December Masters	16	4	2–1	3rd–4th	
2024	CTWC Texas	12	5	4–0	1st	
2024	CTM February Masters	16	2	2–1	3rd–4th	
2024	CTM Mega Masters	64	4	3–1	5th–8th	
2024	CTM April Masters	16	6	2–1	3rd–4th	
2024	CTWC World Championship	48	26	2–1	9th–16th	
2024	CTM Lone Star DAS	16	1	3–1	2nd	
2024	CTM July DAS Masters	16	12	4–0	1st	
2024	CTWC DAS Jonas Cup (Note: in memory of Jonas Neubauer)	48	8^{†}	3–1	3rd–4th	
2024	CTM September DAS Masters	16	1	4–0	1st	
2024	CTWC Stillwater DAS	14	1^{†}	2–1	2nd	
2024	CTM October DAS Masters	32	1^{‡}	4–0	1st	
2025	CTM January DAS Masters	32	7^{‡}	4–0	1st	
2025	CTM February DAS Masters	32	1^{‡}	4–0	1st	
2025	CTM April Mega Masters	64	18^{†}	1–1	17th–32nd	
2025	CTM May DAS Masters	32	1^{‡}	3–1	2nd	
2025	CTWC World Championship	48	8^{†}	1–1	9th–16th	
2025	CTM June Masters	32	11^{†}	5–0	1st	
2025	CTM June DAS Masters	32	4^{‡}	4–0	1st	
2025	CTWC DAS World Cup (Note: "CTWC DAS: The World Cup of DAS", held in Cologne, Germany)	64	1^{‡}	7–1	2nd	
2025	CTM July TAP Masters	32	8^{‡}	0–1	9th–16th	
2025	CTM August Masters	32	1^{‡}	3–1	2nd	
2025	CTM August DAS Masters	32	6^{‡}	4–0	1st	
2025	CTWC Ohio (Note: jointly hosted by CTWC & WPL)	32	4^{‡}	2–1	3rd–4th	
2025	CTWC Houston (Note: "Space City")	18	4^{†}	1–1	5th–8th	
2025	CTWC Houston DAS	15	1^{†}	2–1	2nd	
2025	CTWC DAS Jonas Cup	48	1^{†}	5–0	1st	
2025	CTM October Masters	32	2^{‡}	0–1	9th–16th	
2025	CTM October Mega DAS Masters	64	2^{‡}	5–0	1st	
2025	CTM November Masters	32	3^{‡}	2–1	3rd–4th	
2025	CTM December Masters	32	4^{‡}	2–1	3rd–4th	
2026	CTM January Masters	32	4^{‡}	1–1	5th–8th	
2026	CTM January DAS Masters	32	1^{‡}	2–1	3rd–4th	
2026	CTWC Genesis DAS (Note: hosted concurrently with the Super Smash Bros. tournament of the same name.)	16	1	4–0	1st	
2026	CTWC Genesis	16	4	3–1	3rd	
2026	CTM February STM Masters (Note: "Crunch Mode", width of playing field shortened to four.)	16	2	4–0	1st	
2026	CTM March DAS Masters	32	1^{‡}	4–0	1st	
2026	CTM April STM Masters (Note: "Low Stack", height of playing field shortened to eleven.)	16	1	4–0	1st	
2026	CTM April Masters	32	3^{‡}	2–1	3rd–4th	
2026	CTM May Mega Masters	64	5^{‡}	2–1	5th–8th	
2026	CTWC World Championship	48	13^{†}	1–1	9th–16th	
2026	CTM June DAS Masters	32	2^{‡}	4–0	1st	
2026	CTWC DAS World Cup (Note: "CTWC DAS: The World Cup of DAS", held in Manchester, England)	48	3^{‡}	5–0	1st	
2026	CTM July DAS Masters	32	6^{‡}	4–0	1st	
2026	CTM August DAS Masters	32	1^{‡}	4–0	1st	
2026	CTM September DAS Masters	32	1^{‡}	4–0	1st	
2026	CTWC DAS Jonas Cup	48	2^{†}	5–0	1st	

Event host
CTWC	Classic Tetris World Championship	held in-person (Note: unless indicated otherwise by a footnote)
CTM	Classic Tetris Monthly	held online

Default wins
^{†}	single-dagger symbol	high seed after qualifying round, awarding a single bye
^{‡}	double-dagger symbol	high seed after qualifying round, awarding a double bye
