= Joseph Saelee =

Competitive Tetris player

JdMfX_
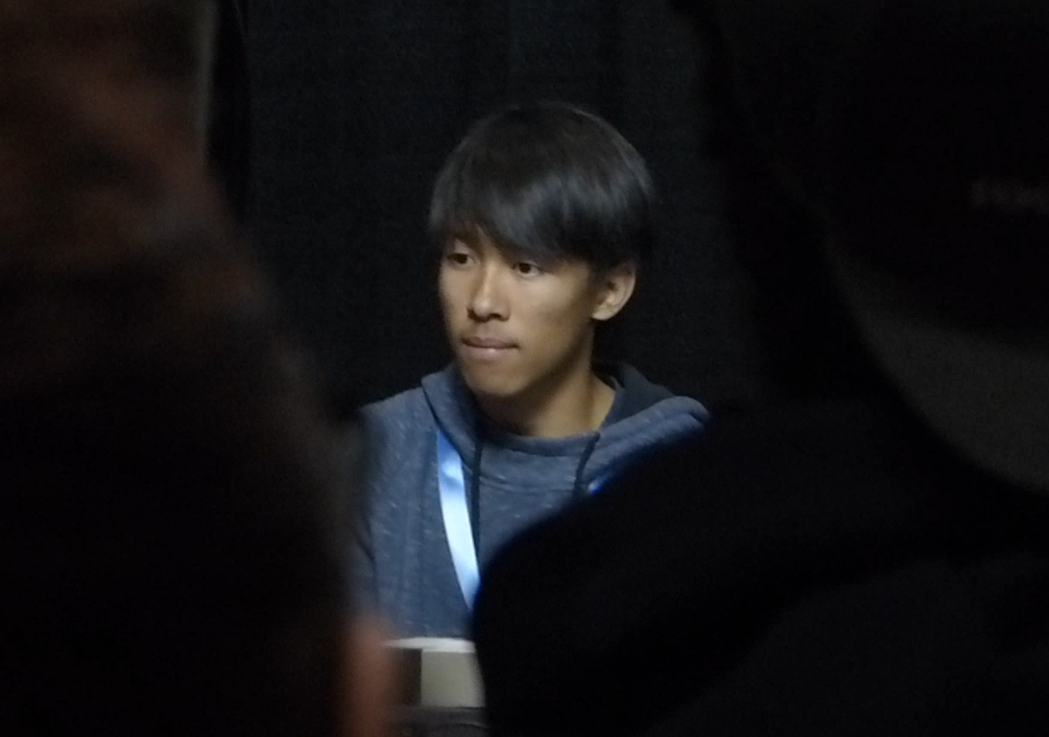
- Saelee at the 2018 World Championship

Personal information
- Name: Joseph Saelee
- Born: August 21, 2002 (age 24)

Career information
- Playing career: 2018–present

Career highlights and awards
- 2× World Championship winner (2018, 2019); 6× Masters winner (2019–2021); 4 time highscore world record (2019–2020)

Joseph Saelee, also known online as JdMfX_ or JD, is an American Tetris player. He is best known for his back-to-back victories in the 2018 and 2019 Classic Tetris World Championship (CTWC) and for setting and holding the NES Tetris high-score world record for over a year. He is also known for helping pioneer the hypertapping playstyle, as well as being one of the top players during his CTWC career.

== Tetris career ==
Saelee first was introduced to the Classic Tetris videos on YouTube of the 2016 CTWC finals match between Jeff Moore and Jonas Neubauer. He purchased an original 1985 Nintendo NES console shortly after and began practicing. He began playing competitively in the online scene with the Classic Tetris Monthly online tournament in February 2018.

=== Classic Tetris World Championship ===
He debuted in the in-person scene with the 2018 world championship, coming just "to qualify", and was able to secure a spot as the fifth seed and a first-round bye. During his qualifying games, he set a record, being the first player to reach level 30 in a live tournament. In tournament play he defeated former champion Harry Hong and the number-one seed, Japanese Tetris Grandmaster Koji "Koryan" Nishio to make it to the finals. In an upset he swept the then seven-time champion (and at the time reigning champion), Jonas Neubauer, 3–0. Saelee won $1,000 as prize money from winning, and was the youngest to win the championship at the time, at the age of 16. After the match, Neubauer is quoted as saying how it's "truly an honor to pass the torch to the new generation of Tetris players". This match went viral on YouTube, and many new competitors since have cited this match as their inspiration to play the game, like the two time CTWC winners Alex Thach and Michael Artiaga as well as Artiaga's brother, Andrew. The YouTube video of the match as of February 2025 now has over 20 million views, as well as a replay being shown on ESPN2 during the COVID-19 pandemic.

Saelee's utilized a unique play style called "hypertapping". While there have been hypertapping players in the past, notably Thor Aackerlund and Koji Nishio, the latter who inspired Saelee to become a hypertapper, Saelee was much more adept at the high speed play. He was able to press the D-pad at speeds of up to 15 times per second, being the first person to reach levels 31 through 35 and being cited as the innovator of post level 29 play.

In the 2019 tournament, which had begun to feature more younger players, Saelee qualified as the number-one seed and he again advanced to the finals to play against Nishio again, who was the number two seed. The match between the two hypertappers went to a deciding game five, which Saelee won, achieving back to back titles. Alexey Pajitnov, the original creator of Tetris, personally handed the trophy to Saelee after his victory.

Due to the COVID-19 pandemic, the 2020 and 2021 tournaments were held online. Due to the nature of it being online, they were able to accommodate 64 players, separating them into group brackets A-H with a loser's bracket. In the tournament, Saelee was able to make it into the top eight bracket but fell in the initial match to Jacob "Huffulufugus" Huff. The 2021 tournament was the first to have the newest playstyle of rolling, which was then still a very undeveloped technique. Saelee advanced to the semifinals before playing against Huff again. The match went to a decider that Huff would win.

=== World records ===
After the 2018 CTWC, Saelee would go on to set multiple NES Tetris records. As mentioned above, he was the first person recorded to reach the levels 31, 32, 33, 34, 35, and 38. On an alternative account called "1975TylerP" he set a high score world record of 1,298,840. In December 2018 he set a new high score world record with the first 1.3 million in NES Tetris history. He would go on to beat his record twice with scores of 1.375 million and 1.390 million respectively. On June 14th, 2020, he would allegedly score 1.4 million points, however, it was unrecorded, and only a handful of people watching through a shared Discord call were able to witness it.

=== Hiatus and return to Tetris (2021–2025) ===
Saelee, following the 2021 World Championship, would step back from the competitive scene, with the new playstyle called "rolling" beginning to outclass hypertapping. He would make a return in 2025 in the Classic Tetris Monthly Tap Masters tournament, a tournament solely dedicated to Hypertapping, where he would qualify for the 10th seed. He would advance to the semi-finals, where he would play Michael Artiaga. The best of 5 match would go to a decider that Artiaga would eventually win.

== Competitive record ==
This table lists notable Classic Tetris tournaments in which Saelee competed and their outcomes. It includes any appearances at the CTWC, as well as high placings at related tournaments, such as reaching a high level in other CTWC or CTM events. CTM results prior to 2022 list only the winner and runner-up, and information may be incomplete.

| Year | Tournament | Size | Seed | Record | Place | Ref. |
|---|---|---|---|---|---|---|
| 2018 | CTWC World Championship | 40 | 5 | 5-0 | 1st | |
| 2019 | CTM February Masters | N/A | N/A | N/A | 1st | |
| 2019 | CTM March Masters | N/A | N/A | N/A | 2nd | |
| 2019 | CTM October Masters | N/A | N/A | N/A | 1st | |
| 2019 | CTWC World Championship | 48 | 1 | 5-0 | 1st | |
| 2020 | CTM January Masters | N/A | N/A | N/A | 1st | |
| 2020 | CTM May Masters | N/A | N/A | N/A | 1st | |
| 2020 | CTM June Masters | N/A | N/A | N/A | 1st | |
| 2020 | CTWC World Championship (Note: held online due to COVID-19 pandemic) | 64 | 1 | 4-1 | 5th–8th | |
| 2021 | CTM January Masters | N/A | N/A | N/A | 1st | |
| 2021 | CTWC World Championship (Note: held online due to COVID-19 pandemic) | 64 | 3 | 5-1 | 3rd–4th | |
| 2025 | CTM Tap Masters | 32 | 10^{†} | 3-1 | 3rd–4th | |

Event host
| CTWC | Classic Tetris World Championship | held in-person (Note: unless indicated otherwise by a footnote) |
| CTM | Classic Tetris Monthly | held online |

Default wins
| ^{†} | single-dagger symbol | high seed after qualifying round, awarding a single bye |
| ^{‡} | double-dagger symbol | high seed after qualifying round, awarding a double bye |
