= Koji Nishio =

Competitive Classic Tetris Player

Koryan
- Nishio in 2018

Personal information
- Name: Koji Nishio
- Born: April 20, 1977 (age 49)

Career information
- Games: Classic Tetris
- Playing career: 2018–present

Career highlights and awards
- 1× World Championship finalist (2019); 11× Masters winner (2018–2022); 2 time highscore world record (2018–2019)

Koji Nishio, known online as Koryan, is a Japanese classic NES Tetris player. He is best known for his competitive play in the Classic Tetris World Championship (CTWC), having held the high score world record, and his contributions to the community as a player using the hyper-tapping technique. He was considered to be the greatest Japanese NES Tetris player and was generally considered to be one of the most skilled players during the peak of his Tetris career. He is also known for his competitive action in the online tournaments, winning 11 monthly tournaments during his career.

== Tetris career ==
Nishio posted his first recorded maxout of NES Tetris (a score over 1 million points) in 2016, solidifying himself as one of the top classic Tetris players in the world at that time. He differed from other players as he did not use the built in Delayed Auto Shift (DAS) to move the pieces across the board, but instead rapidly mashed the D-pad, a skill he mastered by playing the Gameboy version of Tetris (because the Gameboy version has a much slower version of the DAS relative to the NES). This technique is referred to by players as "hyper-tapping", and by 2017, Nishio was the first major hypertapper since Thor Aackerlund, and is cited to have pioneered this style of play.

=== Classic Tetris World Championship performance ===
Nishio was able to attend the Classic Tetris World Championship from 2016 to 2020, where he performed very well. In his debut to the tournament in 2016, he lost in the semi-finals to the eventual world champion that year, Jonas Neubauer in a 0–2 sweep. In the 2017 World Championship, he would qualify as the number 1 seed, but would lose in the second round to Alex Kerr, the eventual runner up. In 2018 he was noted as the favorite to win by Neubauer, and again qualified the number 1 seed. However, he lost in the semifinals again, this time to young Tetris prodigy Joseph Saelee, who would go on to defeat Neubauer in the finals, ending his streak of championships. This was Joseph Saelee's debut in the CTWC scene, who was notably also a hypertapper, being inspired by Nishio himself. The next year Nishio would reach the finals for the first time, where he matched up against Joseph Saelee again. Their match went to a game 5 decider, in which Joseph prevailed, claiming back to back titles. After these two tournaments, there was a massive influx of popularity, and more new players joined the community. The 2020 and 2021 CTWC would be held online due to the COVID-19 pandemic, and Nishio would participate in both. In 2020 tournament, due to its online nature, accommodated 64 players, double the previous year, separating them into group brackets A-H with a loser's bracket, Nishio made it to the finals of his group, but lost to the eventual champion, Michael Artiaga, also known as dogplayingtetris. In the 2021 tournament, which again features the group stage, Nishio lost in the first round, but was able to continue playing all the way to the finals of the losers bracket, where he lost. Nishio would return to the CTWC scene in 2025, having not attended a live event in the United States since the 2018 CTWC. He was able to qualify for the silver bracket, where he would make it to the quarterfinals.

=== Other notable accomplishments and records ===
Aside from the World Championship, Nishio has set multiple world records and other tournament victories. In June 2018, he set the score world record for NES Tetris with a score of 1,257,740. In August 2018 in Hong Kong, Nishio and Neubauer would play an exhibition game against each other, both being regarded as the best player of their respective countries. This match would go to a decider, and Nishio was able to win game 5 with a maxout score. In 2019, he would improve on his world record record with a score of 1,273,120. This score would eventually be beaten by Joseph Saelee.

During the years of 2018 and 2019, Nishio participated in the Classic Tetris Monthly Tournament 17 times, in which he won 11, include winning three in a row twice. In the other 6 tournaments he did not win, he came in the top four. His 11 CTM titles is tied for the record of CTM Masters victories. In 2023, he participated and helped cast the 2023 Waku Waku NES Tetris Festival in June 17-18th, 2023 in Ota City, Tokyo, Japan. He placed 3rd overall in the event. He would return for the 2025 edition, placing 5th, and helping commentate matches.

In November 2025, a Classic Tetris Friendlies match was made between Nishio and Saelee, who had taken a hiatus from Tetris. Saelee was able to win both matches in a sweep.

== Competitive record ==
This table lists notable Classic Tetris tournaments in which Nishio competed and their outcomes. It includes any appearances at the CTWC, as well as high placings at related tournaments, such as reaching a high level in other CTWC or CTM events. CTM results prior to 2022 list only the winner and runner-up, and information may be incomplete.

Year	Tournament	Size	Seed	Record	Place	Ref.
2016	CTWC World Championship	32	2	3-1	3rd–4th	
2017	CTWC World Championship	32	1	1-1	9th–16th	
2018	CTM February Masters	N/A	N/A	N/A	1st	
2018	CTM April Masters	N/A	N/A	N/A	1st	
2018	CTM June Masters	N/A	N/A	N/A	1st	
2018	CTWC World Championship	40	1	3-1	3rd–4th	
2018	CTM November Masters	N/A	N/A	N/A	1st	
2018	CTM December Masters	N/A	N/A	N/A	1st	
2019	CTM January Masters	N/A	N/A	N/A	1st	
2019	CTM February Masters	N/A	N/A	N/A	2nd	
2019	CTM March Masters	N/A	N/A	N/A	1st	
2019	CTM April Masters	N/A	N/A	N/A	1st	
2019	CTM May Masters	N/A	N/A	N/A	1st	
2019	CTM July Masters	N/A	N/A	N/A	1st	
2019	CTM August Masters	N/A	N/A	N/A	1st	
2019	CTM October Masters	N/A	N/A	N/A	2nd	
2019	CTWC World Championship	48	2	4-1	2nd	
2020	CTM February Masters	N/A	N/A	N/A	2nd	
2020	CTM April Masters	N/A	N/A	N/A	2nd	
2020	CTM October Masters	N/A	N/A	N/A	2nd	
2020	CTWC World Championship (Note: held online due to COVID-19 pandemic)	64	13	4-2	9th–16th	
2021	CTWC World Championship (Note: held online due to COVID-19 pandemic)	64	23	3-2	17th–24th	

Event host
CTWC	Classic Tetris World Championship	held in-person (Note: unless indicated otherwise by a footnote)
CTM	Classic Tetris Monthly	held online
