= Classic Tetris World Championship =

Video game competition series

Tournament information
- Sport: Classic Tetris
- Established: 2010
- Number of tournaments: 17
- Venue: Pasadena Convention Center (2024–present); Online (2020–21); Oregon Convention Center (2012–19, 2022–23); University of Southern California (2011); Downtown Independent (2010)
- Purse: $23,256 (2025)
- Website: thectwc.com

Current champion
- Michael Artiaga (2026)

The Classic Tetris World Championship (CTWC) is a video game competition series hosted by the SoCal Gaming Expo. The competition launched in 2010, during the filming of Ecstasy of Order: The Tetris Masters, to determine the world's greatest Tetris player. In its first two years, the competition was held in Los Angeles, California, but was moved to Portland, Oregon, in 2012, and was held there annually through 2023 (with the exceptions of the 2020 and 2021 tournaments, held online due to the COVID-19 pandemic). Since 2024, the tournament has been held in Pasadena, California.

The contestants play the 1989 Nintendo version of Tetris on Nintendo Entertainment System consoles and cathode-ray tube (CRT) video displays. All of the tournaments are streamed online with live-edited screens and heads-up display to improve the viewer experience.

The tournament was initially dominated by Jonas Neubauer, who reached the finals in the first nine iterations of the tournament, winning seven titles with accompanying T-shaped trophies. Following Neubauer's death in 2021, the competition's trophy has been named The Jonas Neubauer Trophy, a J-tetromino in gold for the champion and in silver for the runner-up. The trophy's backside features an engraved quote of his: "If you're a high visibility player, it's on you to move the community in a positive direction".

== Competition ==
The competition takes place over two days, with the qualifying round on the first day and the main event on the second. Contestants are allowed to bring their own controller, but it must be either an original, unmodified NES Controller or an aftermarket unit that is deemed a reproduction that is faithful enough.

=== Qualifying round ===
Qualifying takes place on a fixed number of NES stations. Entrants play "Type A" Tetris, starting on level 9 or higher, and are seeded based on their final score. Once an entrant's game ends for any reason, their score must be recorded by a tournament scorekeeper in order to be valid. Entrants may make as many qualifying attempts as they wish, but must return to the back of the waiting line for each one. Entrants may also pay a fee to rent a station for one hour, which allows unlimited qualifying attempts. In 2022, the lines were discontinued and each player could register for a two-hour time slot in which to make as many qualifying attempts as desired.

The top 32 scorers are seeded into a tournament bracket for the main event. In 2018, 40 players were allowed to qualify, with a "Round Zero" play-off held among the bottom 16 seeds to reduce the field to 32. Forty-eight players qualified in 2019; the top 16 seeds automatically advanced, while the remaining 32 competed in "Round Zero" to fill the other 16 slots. In the event of multiple players maxing out (scoring 999,999 or higher), their highest non-maxout score is recorded to determine their seeding. This was especially utilized in 2018, when seven players maxed out, four of whom (Koji "Koryan" Nishio, Tomohiro "Green Tea" Tatejima, Jonas Neubauer and Harry Hong) maxed out twice. Thus, the officials needed their third-highest scores just to determine the 1st to 4th seeding.

=== Gold Bracket (main event) ===
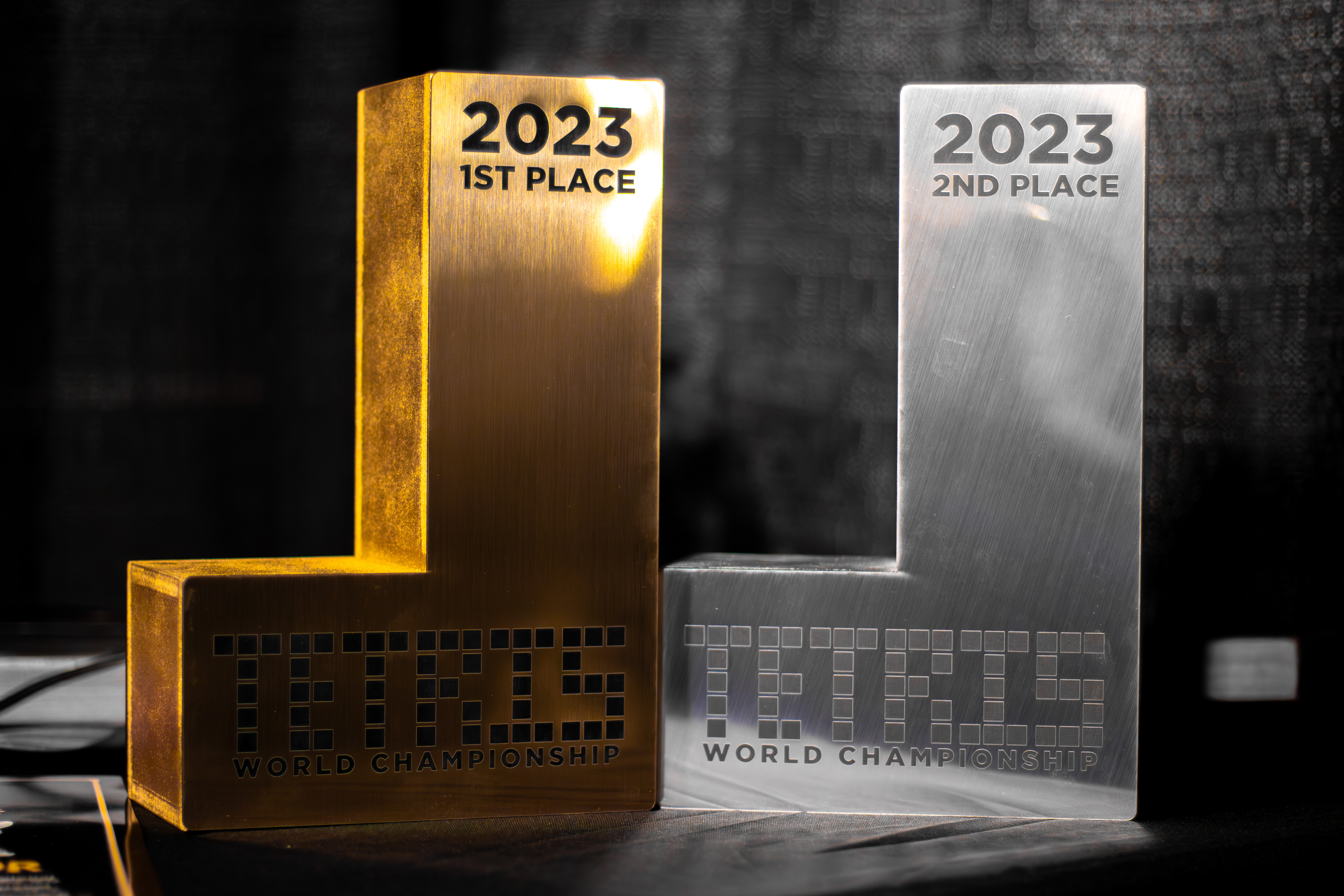
The champion is presented with the Jonas Neubauer Memorial Trophy, which is shaped like a J-tetromino in his honor.

The main event is a single-elimination tournament, called the Gold Bracket, consisting of best of five head-to-head matches. Seeds from opposite ends of the qualifying rankings are pitted against each other in the first round, with the top 16 seeds being awarded a bye. Originally, competition games were played on unmodified NES Tetris game cartridges. Beginning from the 2016 tournament, the game code was modified to be capable of displaying 7-figure score values (prior to this change, the score would 'max out' at 999,999). Beginning from the 2023 tournament, game code was further modified such that at level 39, the speed of the falling pieces is increased to 2 cells per frame, effectively inhibiting gameplay past level 39.

Both players in a match play "Type A" Tetris, beginning on Level 18, at the same time on separate systems. The player who reaches a higher score wins the round. Matches between players are best-of-three or best-of-five rounds, depending on the event.

=== Silver & Bronze Bracket ===
In a manner similar to the National Invitation Tournament, silver and bronze tournaments were introduced in 2020 and 2021 respectively. Each bracket consists of 32 top-scoring players who failed to qualify for the main event. Just as with the Gold Bracket, all games are fully broadcast and each winner will receive a smaller trophy and an interview. In 2022, a local media outlet incorrectly identified the Silver Bracket winner as the "Tetris world champion".

== History ==
=== Early years (2010–2017) ===
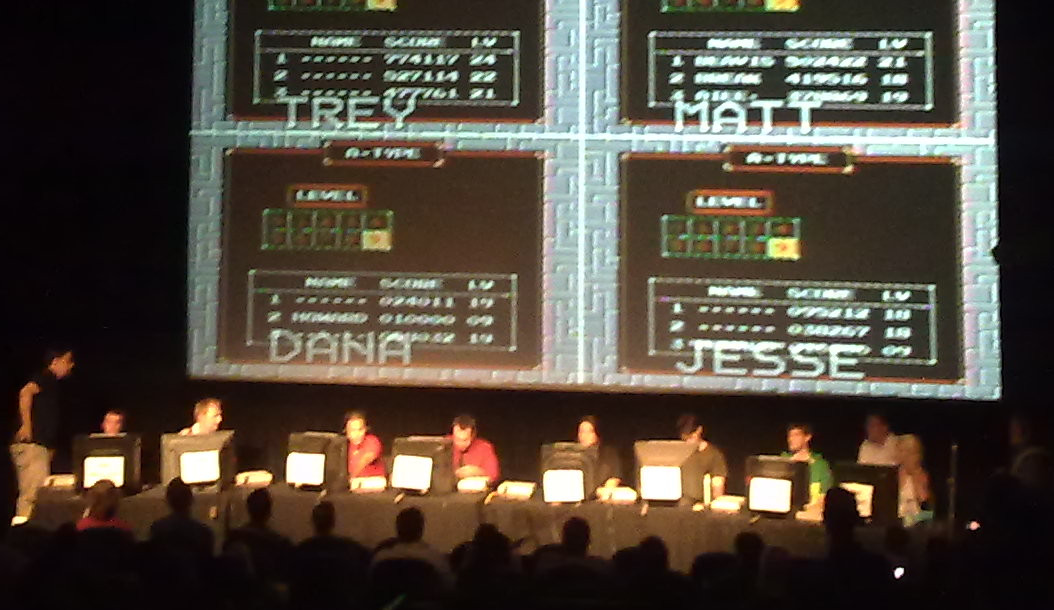
The CTWC 2010 semifinals at the Downtown Independent

The inaugural Classic Tetris World Championship was held on August 8, 2010, at the Downtown Independent theater in Los Angeles, California. Los Angeles was chosen because several high-ranking players lived there. Modeled after the 1990 Nintendo World Championships, eight players completed three Tetris challenges to decide the two finalists. Five of the eight seats in the semifinal were reserved for specific distinguished Tetris players: Jonas Neubauer, Harry Hong, Ben Mullen, Jesse Kelkar and Thor Aackerlund. Neubauer won $1,000 after defeating Hong in the final. The tournament was attended by Henk Rogers and a film crew for the 2011 documentary Ecstasy of Order: The Tetris Masters.

The second annual championship was held at the University of Southern California's Bovard Auditorium on October 16, 2011, with financial support from Electronic Arts. The main tournament was now a single-elimination tournament, and all matches were best-of-three. Neubauer successfully defended his title against Alex Kerr in the final. In addition to classic Tetris, tournaments were also held for EA's Tetris for PlayStation 3 (including both a solo and 2 vs 2 team tournament, with best-of-seven matches) and the tabletop game Tetris Link.

The 2011 tournament was expensive and poorly attended, and it was unclear if a third event would be feasible. In what Chris Tang describes as the tournament being "saved by a miracle", the Portland Retro Gaming Expo – held at the Oregon Convention Center – made arrangements for it to be held there beginning in 2012. Neubauer continued his winning streak in the 2012 and 2013 finals, which were now held as best-of-five matches. His streak was interrupted in 2014 when he was defeated by Hong, but he regained the title with his fifth championship win in 2015.

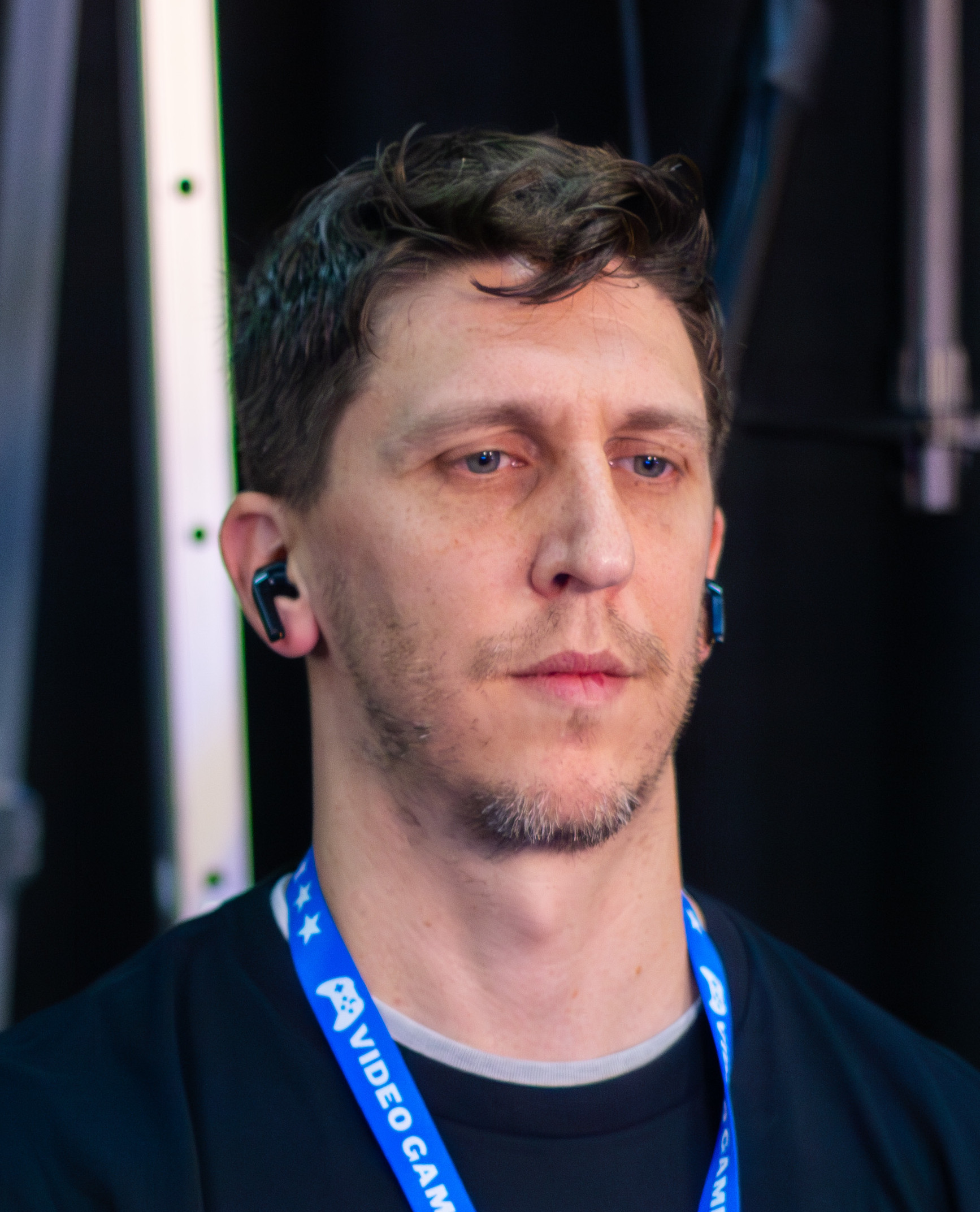
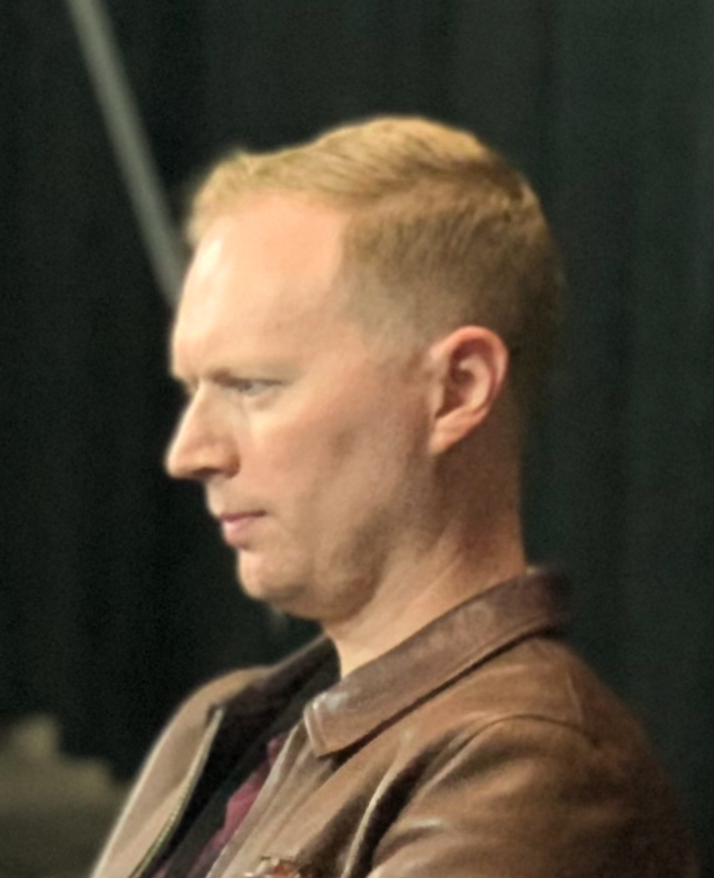
The 2016 final between Jeff Moore (left) and Jonas Neubauer (right) became popular online due to its enthusiastic and repetitive commentary.

Neubauer's opponent in the 2016 final was Jeff Moore, a dark horse who was performing strongly. Moore's impressive play got the commentators "overly excited", and they enthusiastically yelled "Boom! Tetris for Jeff!" every time he scored. Although Moore was not able to defeat Neubauer, the match became popular on YouTube, where it was parodied. Writing for Engadget, James Trew credits the Neubauer–Moore match and "Boom! Tetris for Jeff!" with "piqu[ing] the interest of younger eyes and kickstart[ing] a growing appetite for competitive classic Tetris videos."

=== Hypertapping era (2018–2021) ===
After watching the Neubauer–Moore match on YouTube, 15-year-old Joseph Saelee became interested in Tetris. He prioritized learning a rare playstyle called hypertapping, which by 2017 had only been used competitively by two players – Thor Aackerlund and Koji "Koryan" Nishio. When hypertapping, the buttons on the game controller are pressed extremely rapidly with muscle tremors (rather than pressing and holding buttons). Within one year, Saelee had set numerous world records with the technique.

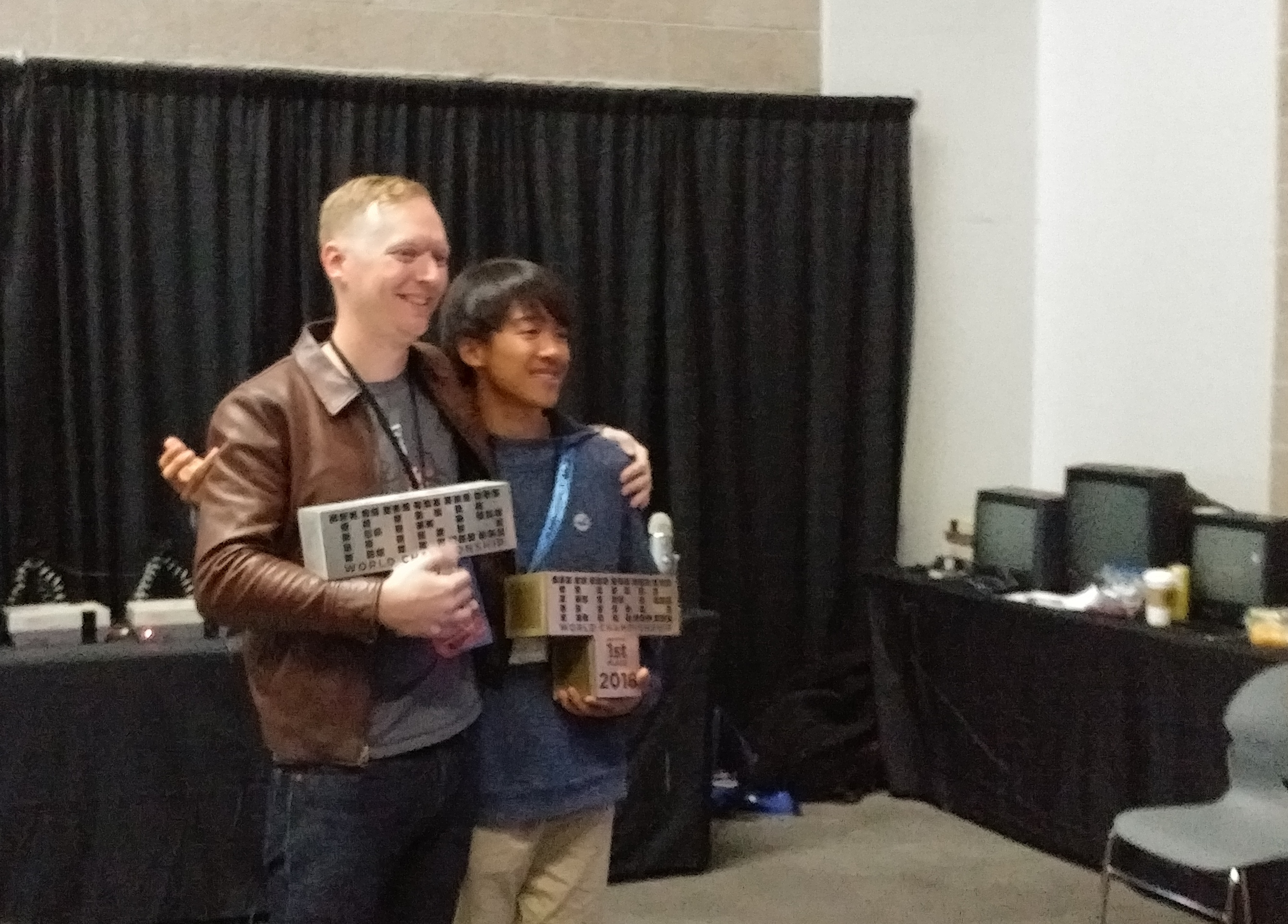
Jonas Neubauer (left) and Joseph Saelee (right) posing with their trophies

Saelee, now 16 years old, entered the 2018 tournament hoping "just to qualify", without serious expectations for his first competition. He was much younger than most competitors, many of whom were in their thirties or forties. After defeating both Hong and Koryan, he had reached the final, where he would face Neubauer. Saelee won the final 3–0, becoming the new world champion. He initially exited the stage emotional and speechless; Neubauer took the microphone to praise Saelee's play.

The YouTube video of the Neubauer–Saelee match, titled "16 y/o Underdog vs. 7-time Champ", became the most-viewed competitive Tetris match and is credited with popularizing hypertapping and attracting young players to Tetris. As of 2025, it has over 20 million views. The 2018 event was shown on commercial television, with a recap airing on ESPN2. Future recaps would air as part of ESPN8: The Ocho special programming.

In 2019, Saelee won back-to-back titles, defeating rival hypertapper Koji Nishio.

Due to the COVID-19 pandemic, the 2020 event was held online with a different set of rules from the in-person tournaments. Michael Artiaga (dogplayingtetris) won the final. He became the youngest-ever champion, aged 13 years and 16 days, defeating his 15-year-old brother Andrew Artiaga (P1xelAndy). Michael Artiaga scored back-to-back CTWC victories by defeating Jacob Huff in the 2021 final.

=== Rolling era (2022–present) ===
Although Huff had lost in 2021, he demonstrated the effectiveness of a new style of play known as "rolling." Originally introduced by CTWC regular Chris "Cheez" Martinez, the playstyle involves partially depressing the controller's D-pad with one hand, while tapping the back of the controller with the fingers of the other, pushing the controller the rest of the way into the first hand and registering an input. The new strategy has brought in a wave of scoring records, with the world record more than quadrupling, and has seen former DAS players and hypertappers (including the Artiagas) adopt the playing style.

The 2022 tournament, held in Portland for the first time in three years, was dominated by rollers. Eric Tolt "EricICX" defeated Justin Yu "Fractal161" to win the title three games to one. The third game saw both players exceed 2.1 million points, with Tolt winning the game and later the crown.

The 2023 event saw Yu win his first title, coming from 0–2 down to defeat Eve "Sidnev" Commandeur of the Netherlands 3–2 in the final. Commandeur also set the qualifying record with 16 maxouts, which was tied by both Willis Gibson "Blue Scuti" and Noah Dengler in the 2024 event.

In the 2024 tournament, now held in Pasadena, Alex Thach claimed his first title, defeating former two-time champion Michael Artiaga in a close 3:2 decider.

The 2025 tournament again was won by Thach, notably without losing a single game in bracket play. Thach also set a new qualifying record by tying the previous 16 maxouts, but with an additional high score of 971,440 points, less than a tetris short of an unprecedented 17th maxout.

The 2026 tournament saw Michael Artiaga "dogplayingtetris" reclaim the title to secure his third world championship, defeating "meme" 3–2 in the final. In the semifinals, Artiaga advanced after two-time defending champion Alex Thach was forced to forfeit the match due to an injury. With the ultimate tournament victory, Artiaga broke Thach's title streak and became the first player since Jonas Neubauer to win three world championships. He also became the first person to win a world championship with two different playstyles.

== Results ==
=== Official rankings each year ===
Year	Date	Location	Players	Purse	Final Score	Champion	Runner-up	3rd place (Note: There is no match between the losing semi-finalists. Instead, 3rd and 4th place are distinguished based on the scores from the semi-final matches.)	4th place
2010	8–9 August	Los Angeles, California	200+	$1,000	2–0	(United States) Jonas Neubauer	(United States) Harry Hong	(United States) Matt Buco	(United States) Dana Wilcox
2011	16 October	Los Angeles, California	20	$1,000	2–0	(United States) Jonas Neubauer (2)	(United States) Alex Kerr "Kitaru"	(United States) Harry Hong	(United States) Robin Mihara
2012	30 September	Portland, Oregon	28	$1,500	3–0	(United States) Jonas Neubauer (3)	(United States) Mike Winzinek	(United States) Eli Markstrom	(United States) Alex Kerr "Kitaru"
2013	6 October	Portland, Oregon	28	$3,000	3–2	(United States) Jonas Neubauer (4)	(United States) Harry Hong	(United States) Chad Muse	(United States) Matt Buco
2014	19 October	Portland, Oregon	32	$2,000	3–1	(United States) Harry Hong	(United States) Jonas Neubauer	(United States) Terry Purcell	(United States) Eli Markstrom
2015	18 October	Portland, Oregon	68	$2,000	3–1	(United States) Jonas Neubauer (5)	(United States) Sean Ritchie "Quaid"	(United States) Alex Kerr "Kitaru"	(United States) Harry Hong
2016	23 October	Portland, Oregon	72	$1,500	3–1	(United States) Jonas Neubauer (6)	(United States) Jeff Moore	(United States) Harry Hong	(Japan) Koji Nishio "Koryan"
2017	22 October	Portland, Oregon	100	$1,500	3–0	(United States) Jonas Neubauer (7)	(United States) Alex Kerr "Kitaru"	(United States) Sean Ritchie "Quaid"	(United States) Matt Buco
2018	21 October	Portland, Oregon	40	$1,500	3–0	(United States) Joseph Saelee	(United States) Jonas Neubauer	(Japan) Tomohiro Tatejima "Greentea"	(Japan) Koji Nishio "Koryan"
2019	20–21 October	Portland, Oregon	48	$10,000	3–2	(United States) Joseph Saelee (2)	(Japan) Koji Nishio "Koryan"	(United States) Aidan Jerdee "Batfoy"	(United States) Daniel Zhang "DanQZ"
2020	31 Oct–12 Dec	Online	163	$10,000	3–2	(United States) Michael Artiaga "DogPlayingTetris"	(United States) Andrew Artiaga "PixelAndy"	(United States) Jacob Huff "Huffulufugus"	(Indonesia) Nenu Zefanya Kariko
2021	9 Oct–15 Nov	Online	206	$10,000	3–1	(United States) Michael Artiaga (2) "DogPlayingTetris"	(United States) Jacob Huff "Huffulufugus"	(United States) Joseph Saelee	(United States) Andrew Artiaga "PixelAndy"
2022	15–16 October	Portland, Oregon	110	$23,012	3–1	(United States) Eric Tolt "EricICX"	(United States) Justin Yu "Fractal161"	(United States) Andrew Artiaga "PixelAndy"	(United States) Michael Artiaga "DogPlayingTetris"
2023	13–15 October	Portland, Oregon	134	$21,016	3–2	(United States) Justin Yu "Fractal161"	(Netherlands) Eve Commandeur "Sidnev"	(United States) Willis Gibson "Blue Scuti"	(United States) Michael Artiaga "DogPlayingTetris"
2024	7–9 June	Pasadena, California	128	$32,069	3–2	(United States) Alex Thach "Alex T"	(United States) Michael Artiaga "DogPlayingTetris"	(United States) Tristan Kwai "Tristop"	(United States) Noah Dengler "TheDengler"
2025	6–8 June	Pasadena, California	128	$23,256	3–0	(United States) Alex Thach (2) "Alex T"	(United States) "Meme"	(United States) Willis Gibson "Blue Scuti"	(Canada) David "iBall"
2026	5–7 June	Pasadena, California	129	$14,124	3–2	(United States) Michael Artiaga (3) "DogPlayingTetris"	(United States) "Meme"	(United States) Willis Gibson "Blue Scuti"	(United States) Alex Thach "Alex T"
Sources: 2010 2011 2012–2022 2023 2024 2025

=== Summary ===
Player	Wins	Losing finals	Losing semi-finals	Losing quarter-finals
(United States) Jonas Neubauer	7	2		
(United States) Michael Artiaga	3	1	2	
(United States) Joseph Saelee	2		1	1
(United States) Alex Thach	2		1	1
(United States) Harry Hong	1	2	3	3
(United States) Justin Yu	1	1		
(United States) Eric Tolt	1			
(United States) Alex Kerr		2	2	2
(United States) "Meme"		2		
(United States) Andrew Artiaga		1	2	1
(Japan) Koji Nishio		1	2	
(United States) Jacob Huff		1	1	3
(United States) Sean Ritchie		1	1	3
(Netherlands) Eve Commandeur		1		3
(United States) Jeff Moore		1		
(United States) Mike Winzinek		1		
(United States) Matt Buco			3	2
(United States) Willis Gibson			3	1
(United States) Eli Markstrom			2	2
(United States) Chad Muse			1	2
(United States) Terry Purcell			1	2
(United States) Tristan Kwai			1	2
(United States) Noah Dengler			1	1
(Indonesia) Nenu Zefanya Kariko			1	1
(Japan) Tomohiro Tatejima			1	1
(United States) Dana Wilcox			1	1
(Canada) David			1	
(United States) Aidan Jerdee			1	
(United States) Robin Mihara			1	
(United States) Daniel Zhang			1	
(United States) Josh Tolles				5
(United States) Trey Harrison				3
(Finland) Jani Herlevi				3
(United States) Ben Mullen				3
(United States) Bo Steil				3

=== Notable achievements ===
Achievement	Year	Player(s)	Ref.
First level 30 in qualifying round of CTWC	2018	(United States) Joseph Saelee	
First level 31 in qualifying round of CTWC	2019	(United States) Joseph Saelee	
First maxout in CTWC tournament	2019	(United States) Joseph Saelee	
First double maxout in CTWC tournament	2019	(United States) Joseph Saelee (Japan) Tomohiro Tatejima ("Greentea")	
First double 1.1 million score in CTWC tournament	2020	(United States) Michael Artiaga ("DogPlayingTetris") (Japan) Koji Nishio ("Koryan")	
First double 1.3 million score in CTWC tournament	2021	(United States) Michael Artiaga ("DogPlayingTetris") (South Korea) Minjun Kim ("Pokenerd")	
First double 1.5 million score in CTWC tournament	2022	(United States) Justin Yu ("Fractal161") (United States) Eric Tolt ("EricICX")	
First double 2.1 million score in CTWC tournament	2022	(United States) Eric Tolt ("EricICX") (United States) Justin Yu ("Fractal161")	
Highest level reached in CTWC tournament	2022	(United States) Eric Tolt ("EricICX") level 71	(Note: Since 2023, Tetris game code used in CTWC matches has been modified to inhibit play past level 39. Prior to this feat, Eric reached level 146 in a CTM match in August 2022.)
Largest number of maxouts in qualifying round of CTWC (in 2-hour attempts)	2023	(Netherlands) Eve Commandeur ("Sidnev") 16	
Largest number of maxouts in qualifying round of CTWC (in 2-hour attempts)	2024	(United States) Willis Gibson ("Blue Scuti") 16 (United States) Noah Dengler ("TheDengler") 16	
Largest number of maxouts in qualifying round of CTWC (in 2-hour attempts)	2025	(United States) Alex Thach 16 (United States) "Meme" 16	
Won the Gold Bracket without losing a game	2025	(United States) Alex Thach (15 games total)	
First 1.9 million score in CTWC post level 39 cap	2025	(United States) Alex Thach (1,915,820)	(Note: Since 2023, Tetris game code used in CTWC matches has been modified to inhibit play past level 39.)

=== Global stops ===
Since 2018, global CTWC stops have been officially added, many of which are directly linked to the CTWC main event in Pasadena. Other than prizes, the winner of each global stop is sponsored to fly to Pasadena and try to qualify for the finals.

Inaugural year	Region	Event/Location	Organizer(s)
2018	CTWC Hong Kong	Cyberport HK	RETRO.HK, TKO
2018	(Hong Kong) CTWC Asia (Regional Finals)	Cyberport HK / City University of Hong Kong	RETRO.HK, TKO
2018	CTWC Singapore	James Cook University Singapore / Versus City	RetroDNA, RETRO.HK, TKO
2018	CTWC Germany	Gamescom	TKO, Local Community
2019	CTWC Norway	Retrospillmessen	TKO, Local Community
2019	(Taiwan) CTWC Taipei	Taipei Game Show Summer Edition	Brook Gaming, TKO
2019	CTWC Australia	1989 Arcade Newtown	Local Community
2019	CTWC Poland	various	Local Community
2020 (cancelled due to the COVID-19 pandemic)	CTWC Japan	Akihabara Hundred Square Club	Local Community
2022	(United Kingdom) CTWC UK	1UP Gaming Bar	Local Community
2024	CTWC Vietnam (Note: Formerly as Classic Tetris Vietnam Championship (2021 - 2023). Since the fourth edition, this tournament was renamed as CTWC Vietnam, marking the first time this tournament become a part of CTWC Regional Qualifiers.)	Bi Coffee	Local Community

== Similar events and side events ==
During the expo there have been several tournaments on other systems over the years.

- Tetris on the PlayStation 3: 4-player 2-vs-2 team battle with no items (2011)
- Tetris Ultimate on the PlayStation 4: versus mode (2015)
- Tetris & Dr. Mario on SNES: Tetris versus mode, held as a tournament for those who didn't participate in the main event (2016–2017)
- Tetris: The Grand Master 2 on Arcade: versus mode with no items (2016)
- Tetris: The Grand Master on Arcade: regular games racing for the fastest time (2017)
- Tetris Effect on the PlayStation 4: separate gameplays on Journey mode and Mystery mode (2018)
- Nintendo NES Tetris with extra rules: no next preview from Level 18, and race from Level 0 to Level 19 (2018)
- Dr. Mario on NES championship as a side event. (2018)

=== Classic Tetris Monthly (CTM) ===
There is a once-a-month online tournament called Classic Tetris Monthly (CTM) that was previously hosted on the same Twitch channel as the CTWC, but it now is hosted on MonthlyTetris. Competitors routinely compete from around the world in CTM, which is streamed remotely and thus allows for great flexibility on the part of the competitors. Competitive play is broken up into four categories, based on your qualifier for the month, Masters, Hopefuls, Futures, and Community. CTM is overseen and commentated chiefly by Keith "vandweller" Didion, who took over for Jessica "fridaywitch" Starr, the tournament's founder, in the Summer of 2018. Starr premiered the tournament on December 3, 2017, on her personal Twitch channel, with 16 participants that had qualified in the few weeks leading up to the event. Harry Hong, the 2014 CTWC champion, was the tournament's first victor. Didion opened a Twitch account dedicated to CTM, called MonthlyTetris, shortly after he began hosting. There is a prize pool for the top performers of the Masters Division which is crowdfunded each month by donations. Additionally, the CTM Discord server is in many ways the center of the Classic Tetris Community, serving as its primary online meeting space.

=== Classic Tetris European Championship (CTEC) ===
Since 2015, a Classic Tetris European Championship has been played annually in Copenhagen. The tournament follows a similar structure, but is played on the PAL version of NES Tetris rather than the NTSC version. Due to the difference in framerates, the two versions of the game (both of which are designed for the NES) are balanced differently; pieces do not fall at identical speeds on the same level between the two versions. In addition, Delay Auto Shift (DAS) is faster in PAL compared to NTSC. At higher level play, this leads to significant differences in strategy and outcome. In particular, players who employ DAS as their primary strategy are able to play at the highest level.

== See also ==
- Nintendo World Championships
- Nintendo PowerFest '94
- Nintendo Campus Challenge
- Tetris Effect: Connected
