= Alex Thach =

American Tetris player (born 2008)

Alex T
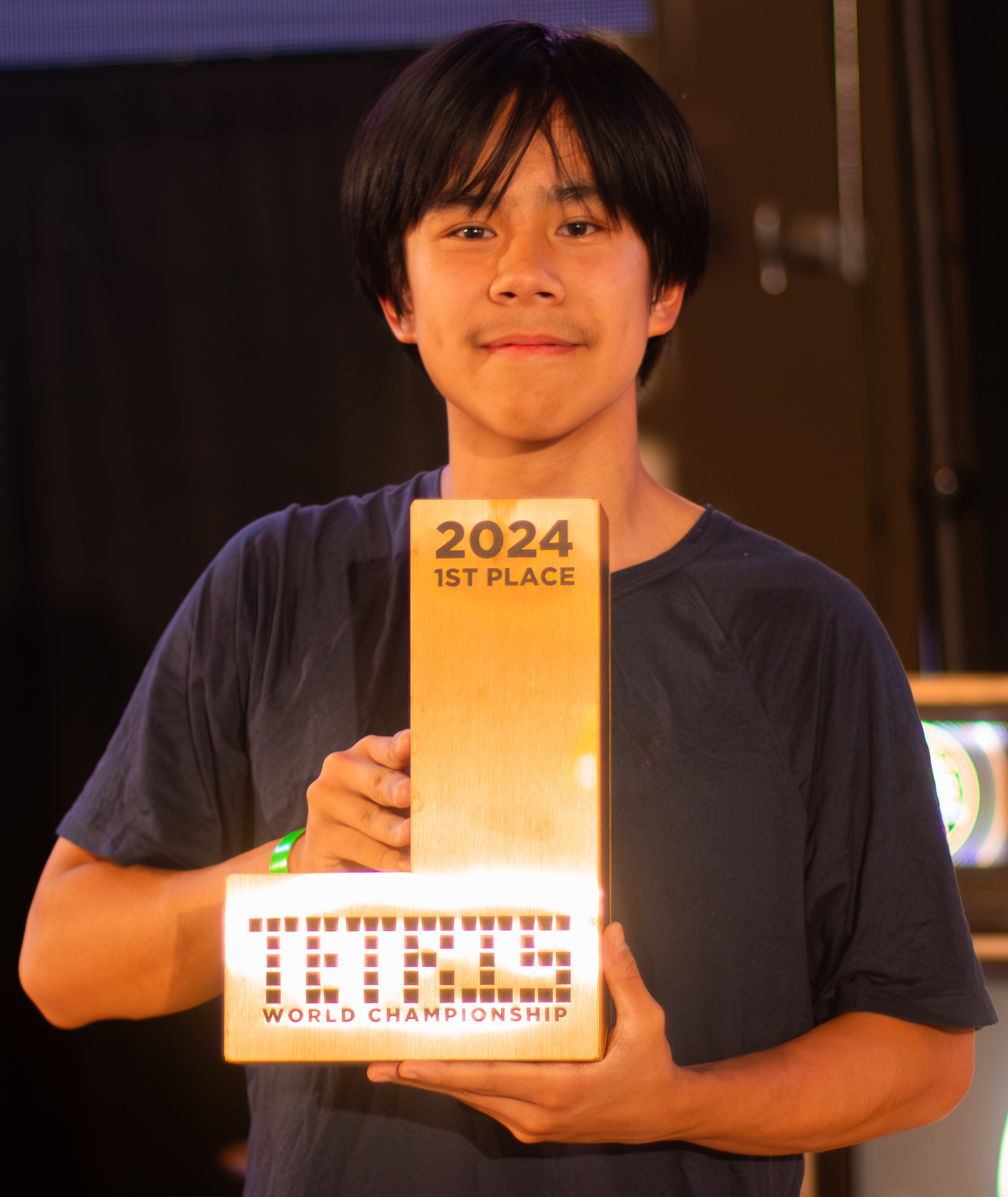
- Thach after winning the 2024 Classic Tetris World Championship

Personal information
- Name: Alex Thach
- Born: November 7, 2008 (age 18)

Career information
- Games: Classic Tetris
- Playing career: 2020–present

Career highlights and awards
- 2× World Championship winner (2024, 2025); 2× Regional winner (2022, 2026); 8× Masters winner (2021–2026); 1× Tap Masters winner (2025); Fourth to "beat" NES Tetris (2024); First ever 10 million point score (2024)

Alex Thach (born November 5, 2008), known online as Alex T, is an American classic Tetris player. He is best known for back-to-back victories in the 2024 and 2025 Classic Tetris World Championships (CTWC), becoming the first person to get a score of over 10 million points, and achieving various other records on both original and modified game cartridges which prevent crashes late game.

Thach entered the competitive Tetris scene in 2020 at 11 years old. He initially found success using the "hypertapping" technique of playing but in 2022 adopted the more competitive "rolling" technique as competition improved. Using the new technique, Thach broke multiple records in a more than hour-long game livestreamed on March 11, 2024, where he achieved the highest level reached in one game and a score of more than 10 million, also winning a $2,600 bounty made by the Tetris community for being the first to do so. On June 9, 2024, Thach won the CTWC after beating two-time former champion Michael Artiaga (known online as "Dogplayingtetris"). On June 9, 2025, Thach became champion again, this time without losing a single game: breaking several records in qualifying and bracket play.

Upon his back-to-back CTWC victories, Thach has been described as the "greatest Tetris player in the world" in a 2025 interview by The Classic W. Thach has also remained in Tetris pop culture by featuring in Guinness World Records, on game shows, and through his signature victory celebration of dumping parmesan cheese on his head.

== Personal life ==
Thach was born on November 7, 2008, and lives in the U.S. state of California.

Besides Tetris, Thach enjoys playing the video games Minecraft, Roblox, and Valorant. Thach also set a personal goal in 2025 to become competitive at rock climbing within ten years.

== Tetris career ==
Thach first became interested in playing Tetris at 11 years old after being recommended a video of the 2018 CTWC finals in which Joseph Saelee defeated Jonas Neubauer. Still within the same year of 2020, he became the youngest player to ever "maxout" the game, achieving a score of 999,999 points. On June 2, 2021, Thach further became the first player to reach level 41. Thach became known to the Tetris community because of these achievements, and in 2022, was able to compete in the Classic Tetris World Championship (CTWC), but was eliminated early and placed 16th. Beginning around April 2023, Thach also began what later became his signature victory celebration of dumping parmesan cheese on his head after winning a match.

On March 11, 2024, Thach uploaded a photo showing a score of 9.9 million points, which surpassed the previous record of 8,952,432 points set by Andrew Artiaga (known online as "PixelAndy") on January 11 earlier in the year. Thach followed this game up by livestreaming a Tetris game lasting slightly over an hour, in which he broke the records for highest level and highest score reached at 235 and 16,248,080 respectively. This game, which was played on a modified version of the game cartridge to suppress crashes that normally occur in later levels of the game, won Thach a $2,600 prize created by the Tetris community for the first person to reach a score of 10 million points. Thach's 16 million high score was also recognized by Guinness World Records as a record for the modified version of Nes Tetris.

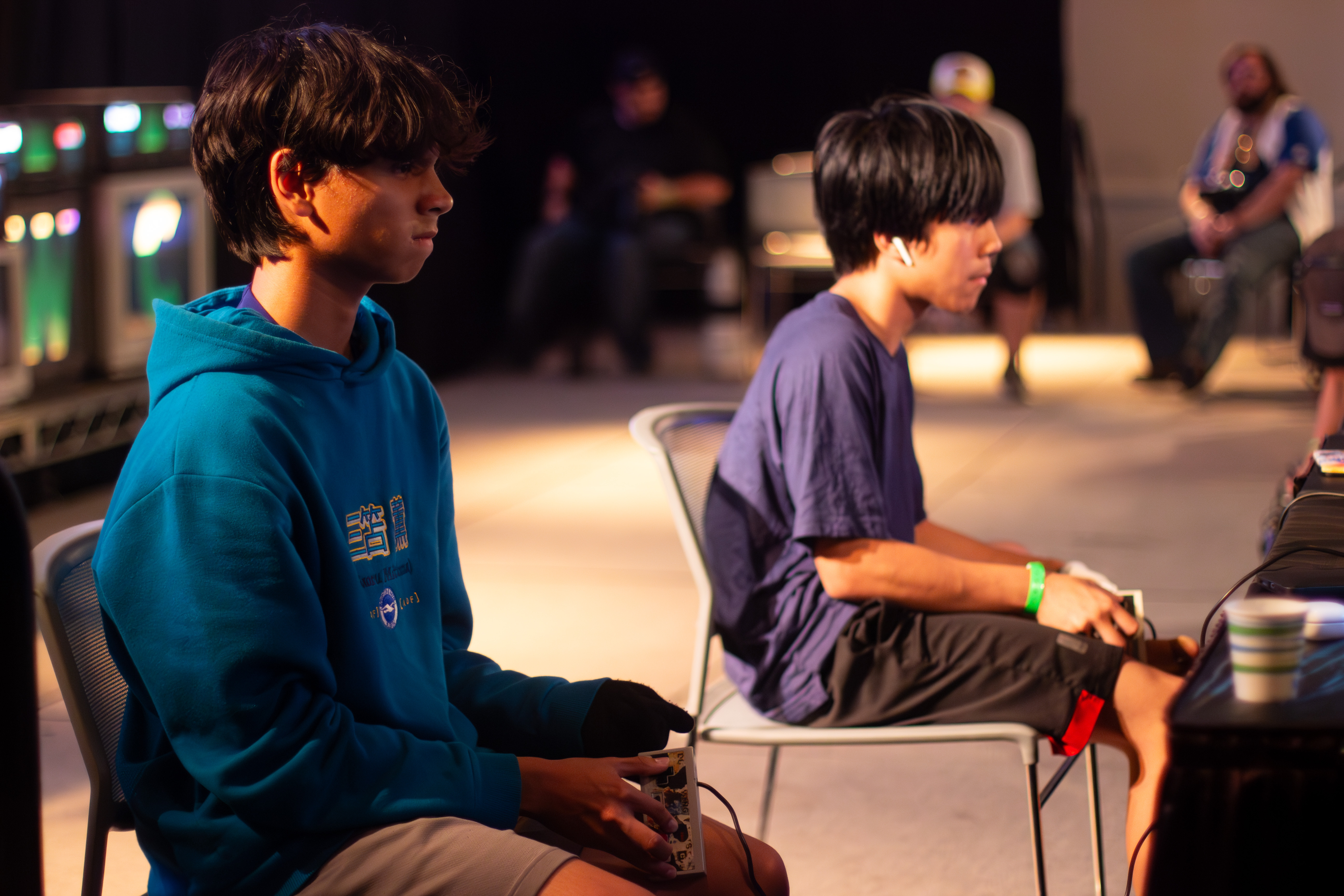
Michael Artiaga competing against Thach in the 2024 CTWC Finals

On April 3, 2024, Thach broke the original game cartridge records for highest score reached and latest game crash achieved, simultaneously becoming the fourth person to ever "beat the game" by triggering a game crash. He also became the first to trigger a rare visual glitch nicknamed "Summoning Satan" by the community. On April 15, 2024, Thach again broke the record for highest score reached on a modified game cartridge after scoring 16,700,760 points. On June 9, 2024, Thach beat two-time previous champion Michael Artiaga (known online as "Dogplayingtetris") to earn his first CTWC title. The golden J-Piece trophy was given to Thach's mother to give to Thach, instead of being awarded by the event's host.

In March 2025, Thach appeared on German television channel RTL, participating in the game show (German: Drei gegen Einen, lit. 'Three versus One'). On the episode, Thach won against the three game show contestants who challenged him in a competition where the first to clear one hundred lines of Tetris won.

From June 6–8, 2025, Thach again won the Classic Tetris World Championship, this time winning the event without losing a single one of his 15 games in five matches. Other records broken by Thach at the event included surpassing the 1.9 million points barrier in this match versus Willis Gibson (known online as "Blue Scuti") and setting a new qualifying record by tying the previous 16 maxouts, but improving the "kicker" score to 971,440 points. Upon these achievements, Thach was described in a 2025 interview by The Classic W as the "greatest Tetris player in the world".

=== Playing style ===
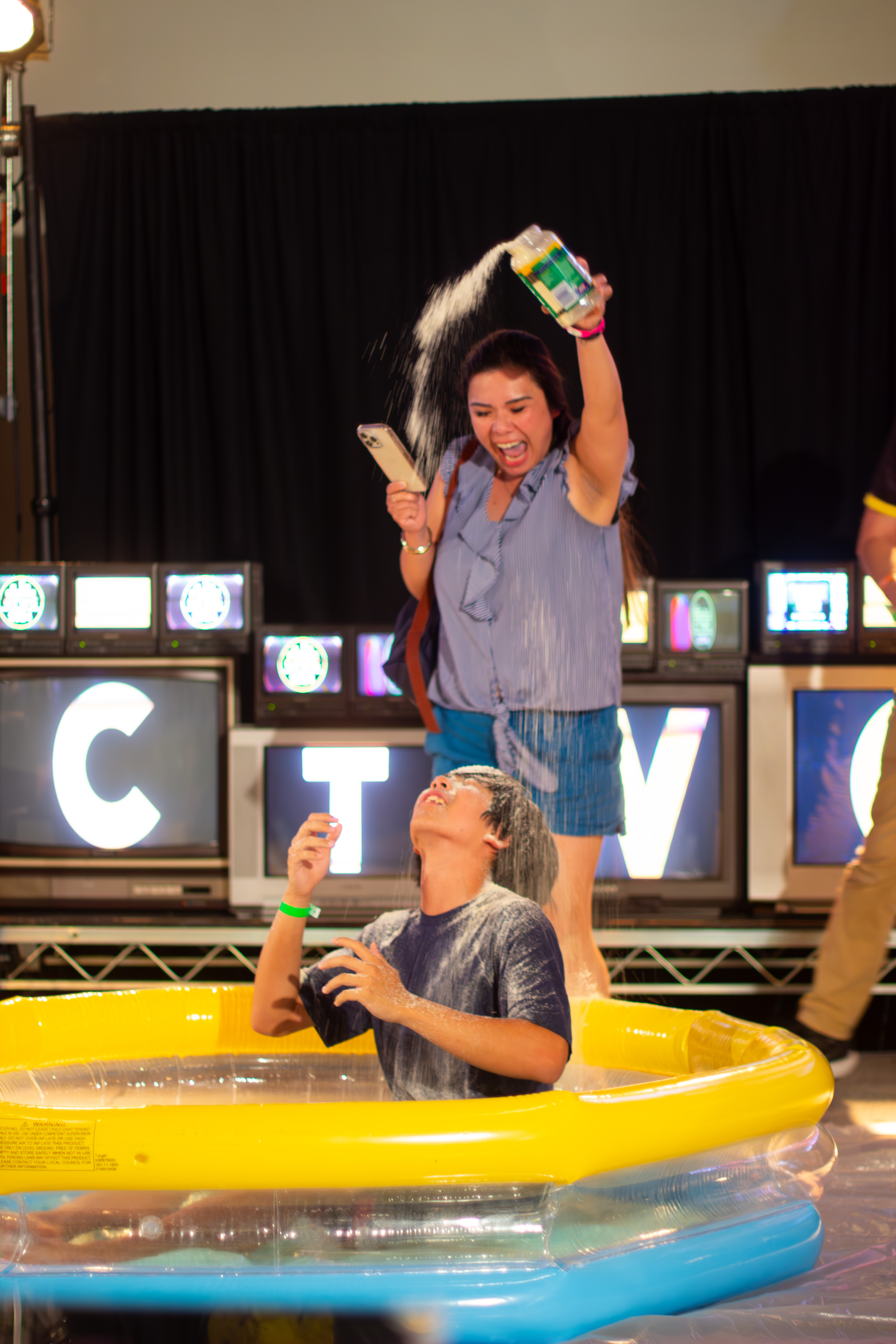
Thach's mother pouring Parmesan cheese on her son's head after winning the 2024 CTWC, his signature victory celebration

Thach began playing NES Tetris in 2020 using "hypertapping", a technique where the player rapidly vibrates their arm to press the buttons on the controller. This technique was used by Joseph Saelee in his winning 2018 and 2019 CTWC tournaments. Thach found much of his early success with hypertapping, but was compelled to adopt a new technique called "rolling" around 2023 and 2024, as hypertapping was becoming obsolete among top players. Rolling, which was created by fellow Tetris player Christopher Martinez (known online as "Cheez") before the 2020 CTWC, is a technique where the player rolls the back of the controller with all five fingers to position the game pieces more quickly.

In regards to attitude while playing, Thach often makes jokes and uses comedic body language, which he has admitted helps soothe his nerves when getting through difficult levels of the game. Thach has also become well known for destroying his setup and dumping various odd items on his head to celebrate victories, most notably parmesan cheese. Thach has notably used this signature victory celebration after beating multiple records in his March 11, 2024, livestream, and after winning the 2024 CTWC. In the latter, an inflatable pool was brought out to collect the cheese as he was doused in it by his mother and the hosts of the tournament. In a 2025 interview, Thach stated he continued to do his parmesan cheese celebration as it was "really funny and got everyone laughing".

== Competitive record ==
This table lists notable Classic Tetris tournaments in which Thach competed in and their outcomes. It includes any appearances at the CTWC World Championship, CTWC DAS Jonas Cup, CTWC DAS World Cup, CTM Mega Masters, as well as high placings at related tournaments, such as reaching at least semifinals in other CTWC or CTM events. CTM results prior to 2022 only list the winner and runner-up, and information may be incomplete.

Competitive record of Alex Thach in Classic Tetris
Year	Tournament	Size	Seed	Score	Place	Ref.
2020	CTM December Challengers	N/A	N/A	N/A	1st	
2021	CTM January Futures	N/A	N/A	N/A	2nd	
2021	CTM June Masters	16	13	3–1	2nd	
2021	CTWC World Championship (Note: held online due to COVID-19 pandemic)	64	30	2–2	17th–32nd	
2021	CTM December Masters	16	5	4–0	1st	
2022	CTM January Masters	16	1	4–0	1st	
2022	CTM February Masters	16	4	3–1	2nd	
2022	CTM March Masters	16	7	2–1	3rd–4th	
2022	CTM April Mega Masters	32	14	3–1	3rd–4th	
2022	CTWC SoCal Regional (Note: jointly hosted by CTWC & WPL)	12	1^{†}	3–0	1st	
2022	CTM August Masters	16	4	2–1	3rd–4th	
2022	CTM September Masters	16	9	3–1	2nd	
2022	CTWC World Championship	48	8^{†}	1–1	9th–16th	
2022	CTM December Masters	16	1	2–1	3rd–4th	
2023	CTM April Mega Masters	78	2^{†}	5–0	1st	
2023	CTM Lone Star (Note: held in-person, CTM Texas regional)	24	9	3–2	4th	
2023	CTM August Masters	16	1	2–1	3rd–4th	
2023	CTWC World Championship	48	8^{†}	2–1	5th–8th	
2023	CTM December Masters	16	2	3–1	2nd	
2024	CTM January Masters	16	1	2–1	3rd–4th	
2024	CTWC Genesis (Note: hosted concurrently with the Super Smash Bros. tournament of the same name)	12	2^{†}	2–1	2nd	
2024	CTM February Masters	16	3	3–1	2nd	
2024	CTM Mega Masters	64	1	4–1	3rd–4th	
2024	CTM April Masters	16	1	4–0	1st	
2024	CTM May Masters	16	2	4–0	1st	
2024	CTWC World Championship	48	4^{†}	5–0	1st	
2024	CTM July Masters	16	2	4–0	1st	
2024	CTM August Masters	16	2	2–1	3rd–4th	
2025	CTWC Genesis	16	3	3–1	2nd	
2025	CTM February Masters (Note: "Faster Masters", level 19 starts only)	32	2^{‡}	3–1	2nd	
2025	CTM March Masters	32	1^{‡}	4–0	1st	
2025	CTM April Mega Masters	64	8^{‡}	0–1	17th–32nd	
2025	CTWC World Championship	48	1^{†}	5–0	1st	
2025	CTM June Masters	32	4^{‡}	2–1	3rd–4th	
2025	CTM July Tap Masters	32	1^{‡}	4–0	1st	
2025	CTM August DAS Masters	32	4^{‡}	0–1	9th–16th	
2025	CTWC DAS Jonas Cup (Note: in memory of Jonas Neubauer)	48	4^{†}	2–1	5th–8th	
2025	CTM October Mega DAS Masters	64	11^{‡}	2–1	5th–8th	
2025	CTM November Masters	32	5^{‡}	2–1	3rd–4th	
2026	CTM January Masters	32	3^{‡}	1–1	5th–8th	
2026	CTM January DAS Masters	32	7^{‡}	0–1	9th–16th	
2026	CTWC Washington State Regional	12	3^{†}	3–0	1st	
2026	CTWC Genesis	16	2	4–0	1st	
2026	CTM February STM Masters (Note: "Crunch Mode", width of playing field shortened to four)	16	4	2–1	3rd–4th	
2026	CTM April Masters	32	7^{‡}	3–1	2nd	

Event host
CTWC	Classic Tetris World Championship	held in-person (Note: unless indicated otherwise by a footnote)
CTM	Classic Tetris Monthly	held online

Default wins
^{†}	single-dagger symbol	high seed after qualifying round, awarding a single bye
^{‡}	double-dagger symbol	high seed after qualifying round, awarding a double bye
