= Michael Artiaga =

American Tetris player (born 2007)

dogplayingtetris
- Artiaga at the 2026 World Championship

Personal information
- Name: Michael Artiaga
- Born: Michael Khanh Artiaga; November 20, 2007 (age 19)

Career information
- Games: Classic Tetris
- Playing career: 2018–present

Career highlights and awards
- 3× World Championship winner (2020, 2021, 2026); 1× World Championship runner-up (2024); 2× World Championship semifinalist (2022, 2023); 1× DAS Jonas Cup semifinalist (2025); 2× Regional winner (2022, 2025); 1× DAS Regional winner (2024); 13× Masters winner (2020–2026); 2× DAS Masters winner (2024, 2025); 1x STM Masters winner (2025); First to "rebirth" NES Tetris (2024); 29.4 million highscore world record (2024)

Michael Khanh Artiaga (born November 20, 2007), known online as dogplayingtetris or simply Dog, is an American Tetris player from Texas. He won the Classic Tetris World Championship (CTWC) three times, in 2020, 2021, and 2026. For the 2020 win, he became Guinness World Record holder for the "Youngest Tetris World Champion" at 13 years old.

From a young age, Michael and his brother Andrew Artiaga experimented in coding, computing, and gaming, alongside their father, a web developer. Practicing Tetris occasionally on their Game Boy, both brothers were inspired to pursue the game further after seeing 16-year-old Joseph Saelee's victory against the 37-year-old reigning champion Jonas Neubauer in the 2018 CTWC. After his victories in the 2020 and 2021 CTWC, Artiaga continued to compete in Tetris tournaments, and additionally founded his own tournament series titled "Classic Tetris Brawl" (CTB).

On October 6, 2024, playing on a modified version of the game, Artiaga became the first player to achieve a "rebirth" of NES Tetris after successfully clearing the highest level of the game, level 255, triggering the game to restart back on level 0. In the same event, Artiaga also broke the game's high score record at 29.4 million points.

== Personal life and upbringing ==
Michael Khanh Artiaga was born on November 20, 2007, to Van and Randall Artiaga and is from Fort Worth, Texas. He and his brother Andrew Artiaga grew up around electronics, as their father was a web developer. At 5 years old he learned basic coding, and further experimented in computing and gaming in elementary school. He and his brother practiced the skills they learned by creating characters and music for several of his father's gaming apps. In an interview with The Guardian, Michael stated his school work took precedence over his gaming, and that math was his favorite subject. Outside of Tetris, Artiaga also practiced speedrunning in other retro games including Super Mario Bros.

== Tetris career ==
Artiaga was introduced to Tetris at 8 years old in elementary school, after playing it on the original Game Boy at home. He collaborated with his brother on their shortcomings while they practiced the game to better their playing. He was originally attracted to the game's need for quick-thinking, speed, and skill. Michael and Andrew, at 10 and 13 years old, respectively, began to play more intently after watching 16-year-old Joseph Saelee's victory against the 37-year-old reigning champion Jonas Neubauer in the 2018 Classic Tetris World Championship (CTWC), marking the beginning of a new generation of Tetris players playing the game.

After purchasing twin famiclones, Artiaga began to compete in tournaments under the name "dogplayingtetris" or simply "Dog", in reference to his avatar being a dog holding a Nintendo controller, while his brother took the nickname "P1xelAndy". In November 2019, Artiaga created his own Tetris tournament called "Classic Tetris Brawl" (CTB), which is made up of a number of events including three-player matches, level 0 to 19 speedruns, and a quarterly "Brawl Championship". In December 2019, he became the youngest person to complete a "maxout", a point in the game where the score becomes so high it no longer registers correctly on-screen.

"The key to success is watching how others play and learning what it is that makes them better than you."

— Michael Artiaga, in an interview with The Guardian after winning the 2020 CTWC.

During the COVID-19 lockdowns in the United States, both brothers began to practice more often while also learning from their competitors on Twitch. At 13 and 15, respectively, both Michael and Andrew qualified for the 2020 CTWC; Michael scored 1 million points in six games, making him the top seed in his double-elimination playoffs group. Michael was the second-youngest competitor there and the youngest to make it to the top eight. After beating fellow competitor Jacob Huff (known online as "Huffulufugus"), Michael made it to the final round with his brother Andrew, where they competed against each other at home due to COVID-19 restrictions. Michael won shortly after reaching level 29, winning $3,000, which he used to buy a real Nintendo Entertainment System (NES), a Donner guitar, an electronic drum set, and invested in cryptocurrency. Andrew celebrated the victory with Michael, giving him a high five immediately after the match; Michael remarked that the "great [thing] about being in the top two is that we both get great trophies". At 13 years and 16 days old, Artiaga set a Guinness World Record as the "Youngest Tetris World Champion".

After his 2020 CTWC victory, Artiaga stated that while he would "always go down as a 13-year-old world champion", he was motivated to win again at the next championship. The following year, Artiaga secured a back-to-back win in the also-virtual CTWC 2021, where he beat 19-year-old Jacob Huff 3–1 to secure another $3,000 prize. His back-to-back win was in the 2023 edition of the Scholastic Book of World Records. On April 9, 2022, Artiaga set another world record for the highest-scoring game on a level 29 start with a score of 2.2 million. From June 7–9, he competed in the 2024 CTWC, where he lost to Alex Thach (known online as "Alex T") in the finals, finishing second in the championship.

On October 6, 2024, Artiaga became the first person to achieve a "rebirth" of the game after successfully clearing the highest level of the game, level 255, triggering the game to restart back on level 0. After achieving rebirth, he continued to play the game from level 0 to level 91, where he finally ended the game with a time of 121 minutes, a final score of 29,486,164 points, 346 levels reached, and about 3,300 lines cleared. The score of 29.4 million points beat the previous high score record set by Alex Thach by more than 12 million points. The high level reached also had Artiaga achieve the first "line count overflow" in the game, which began at level 30 after the rebirth or level 285. Artiaga, who had live-streamed the game on Twitch, celebrated by putting his hands on his head and exclaiming "Am I dreaming, bro?" and "I'm so glad that game is over". The achievement, which had only previously been possible through the use of AI scripts, was completed by using a modified version of the game which prevents the game from crashing after opportunities begin at level 155.

From June 6–8, 2025, Artiaga again competed in the Classic Tetris World Championship. He was eliminated in the round of 16 after losing 2–3 against Tristan Kwai (known online as "Tristop"), ending his five-year streak of reaching at least semifinals.

From June 5–7, 2026, Artiaga won the Classic Tetris World Championship for the third time, defeating "Meme" 3–2 in the final. The victory made him the second player, after Jonas Neubauer, to win three CTWC championships.

=== Playing style ===
"A lot of people try to play it safe, but not Dog. He can be super high in his stack but he's still stacking up. He's waiting for the long bar. And when he does that, he can score so much you just can't keep up."

— Andrew Artiaga, in a 2021 interview with The New York Times about his brother's playing style in classic Tetris.

Early in his Tetris career, Artiaga adopted the practice of hypertapping, a playing technique which emphasizes vibrating the buttons rapidly over pressing them; a technique first popularized by Saelee in his winning 2018 CTWC tournament. His success with the technique led his brother to adopt it too, to keep pace with him before the 2020 CTWC.

Unlike the majority of his competitors, Artiaga continued to utilize hypertapping as late as during the 2021 CTWC; his handling of the controller in the competition was referred to by The New York Times as one "with the breeziness of a cocktail pianist". This was opposed to rolling, a new technique created by fellow Tetris player Christopher Martinez (known online as "Cheez") before the 2020 CTWC. Rolling involves rolling the back of the controller with all five fingers to position the game pieces more quickly. To prepare for competitions, Artiaga typically plays for about 45 minutes to warm-up.

== Competitive record ==
This table lists notable Classic Tetris tournaments in which Artiaga competed in and their outcomes. It includes any appearances at the CTWC World Championship, CTWC DAS Jonas Cup, CTWC DAS World Cup, CTM Mega Masters, as well as high placings at related tournaments, such as reaching at least semifinals in other CTWC or CTM events. CTM results prior to 2022 only list the winner and runner-up, and information may be incomplete.

Competitive record of Michael Artiaga in Classic Tetris
Year	Tournament	Size	Seed	Score	Place	Ref.
2020	CTWC World Championship (Note: held online due to COVID-19 pandemic)	64	4	7–0	1st	
2020	CTM December Masters	N/A	N/A	N/A	1st	
2021	CTM February Masters	N/A	N/A	N/A	1st	
2021	CTM June Masters	16	1	4–0	1st	
2021	CTM July Masters	16	12	4–0	1st	
2021	CTWC World Championship	64	1	7–0	1st	
2022	CTWC Texas (Note: "Southern Qualifier")	12	1^{†}	3–0	1st	
2022	CTM March Masters	16	9	4–0	1st	
2022	CTM April Mega Masters	32	8	4–1	2nd	
2022	CTM May Masters	16	2	2–1	3rd–4th	
2022	CTWC Lone Star (Note: jointly hosted by CTWC & CTM in 2022 only)	12	3^{†}	1–1	3rd–4th	
2022	CTM July Masters	16	5	3–1	2nd	
2022	CTWC World Championship	48	3^{†}	3–1	3rd–4th	
2022	CTM November Masters	16	3	4–0	1st	
2022	CTM December Masters	16	1	2–1	3rd–4th	
2023	CTWC Texas (Note: "Heart of Texas")	16	7	2–1	3rd–4th	
2023	CTM February Masters	16	2	3–0	1st	
2023	CTM March Masters	16	7	2–1	3rd–4th	
2023	CTM April Mega Masters	78	11^{†}	4–1	3rd–4th	
2023	CTM Lone Star (Note: held in-person, CTM Texas regional)	24	10	6–0	1st	
2023	CTM August Masters	16	5	3–1	2nd	
2023	CTWC World Championship	48	10^{†}	3–1	3rd–4th	
2024	CTWC Texas	16	1^{†}	1–1	3rd–4th	
2024	CTM February Masters	16	5	2–1	3rd–4th	
2024	CTM Mega Masters	64	25	3–1	5th–8th	
2024	CTM April Masters	16	2	3–1	2nd	
2024	CTWC World Championship	48	3^{†}	4–1	2nd	
2024	CTM Lone Star	16	3	2–1	3rd–4th	
2024	CTM Lone Star DAS	16	4	2–1	3rd–4th	
2024	CTM August DAS Masters	16	4	4–0	1st	
2024	CTWC DAS Jonas Cup (Note: in memory of Jonas Neubauer)	48	3^{†}	2–1	5th–8th	
2024	CTM September Masters	16	3	3–1	2nd	
2024	CTWC Stillwater	12	2^{†}	1–1	3rd–4th	
2024	CTWC Stillwater DAS	14	2^{†}	3–0	1st	
2024	CTM November Masters (Note: "No Cap November", level 39 super killscreen disabled)	16	15	4–0	1st	
2025	CTM January Masters	32	3^{‡}	3–1	2nd	
2025	CTM January DAS Masters	32	4^{‡}	1–1	5th–8th	
2025	CTM February Masters (Note: "Faster Masters", level 19 starts only)	32	1^{‡}	2–1	3rd–4th	
2025	CTM February DAS Masters	32	4^{‡}	0–1	9th–16th	
2025	CTM March Masters	32	3^{‡}	1–1	5th–8th	
2025	CTM March DAS Masters	32	9^{‡}	5–0	1st	
2025	CTM April Mega Masters	64	1^{‡}	5–0	1st	
2025	CTM May Masters	32	2^{‡}	4–0	1st	
2025	CTM May DAS Masters	32	2^{‡}	0–1	9th–16th	
2025	CTM June Masters	32	16^{†}	1–1	9th–16th	
2025	CTM June DAS Masters	32	13^{†}	1–1	9th–16th	
2025	CTWC World Championship	48	6^{†}	1–1	9th–16th	
2025	CTM July STM Masters (Note: "No Next Box", piece preview disabled)	32	1^{‡}	4–0	1st	
2025	CTM July TAP Masters	32	6^{‡}	3–1	2nd	
2025	CTM August Masters	32	2^{‡}	4–0	1st	
2025	CTM August DAS Masters	32	3^{‡}	1–1	5th–8th	
2025	CTWC Ohio (Note: jointly hosted by CTWC & WPL)	32	2^{‡}	4–0	1st	
2025	CTWC Houston (Note: "Space City")	18	1	4–0	2nd	
2025	CTWC Houston DAS	15	3	1–1	5th–8th	
2025	CTWC DAS Jonas Cup	48	5^{†}	3–1	3rd–4th	
2025	CTM October Masters	32	1^{‡}	2–1	3rd–4th	
2025	CTM October Mega DAS Masters	64	14^{‡}	1–1	9th–16th	
2025	CTM November Masters	32	2^{‡}	3–1	2nd	
2025	CTM December Masters	32	2^{‡}	3–1	2nd	
2026	CTM January Masters	32	6^{‡}	2–1	3rd–4th	
2026	CTM January DAS Masters	32	6^{‡}	1–1	5th–8th	
2026	CTWC Genesis DAS (Note: hosted concurrently with the Super Smash Bros. tournament of the same name)	32	2	3–1	2nd	
2026	CTWC Genesis	32	1	3–1	2nd	
2026	CTM February Masters	32	13^{†}	3–1	3rd–4th	
2026	CTM February STM Masters (Note: "Crunch Mode", width of playing field shortened to four)	16	6	2–1	3rd–4th	
2026	CTM March Masters	32	1^{‡}	2–1	3rd–4th	
2026	CTM April Masters	32	1^{‡}	4–0	1st	
2026	CTM May Mega Masters	64	6^{‡}	1–1	9th–16th	
2026	CTWC World Championship	48	5^{†}	5–0	1st	

Event host
CTWC	Classic Tetris World Championship	held in-person (Note: unless indicated otherwise by a footnote)
CTM	Classic Tetris Monthly	held online

Default wins
^{†}	single-dagger symbol	high seed after qualifying round, awarding a single bye
^{‡}	double-dagger symbol	high seed after qualifying round, awarding a double bye
