= Thor Aackerlund =

American professional esports player

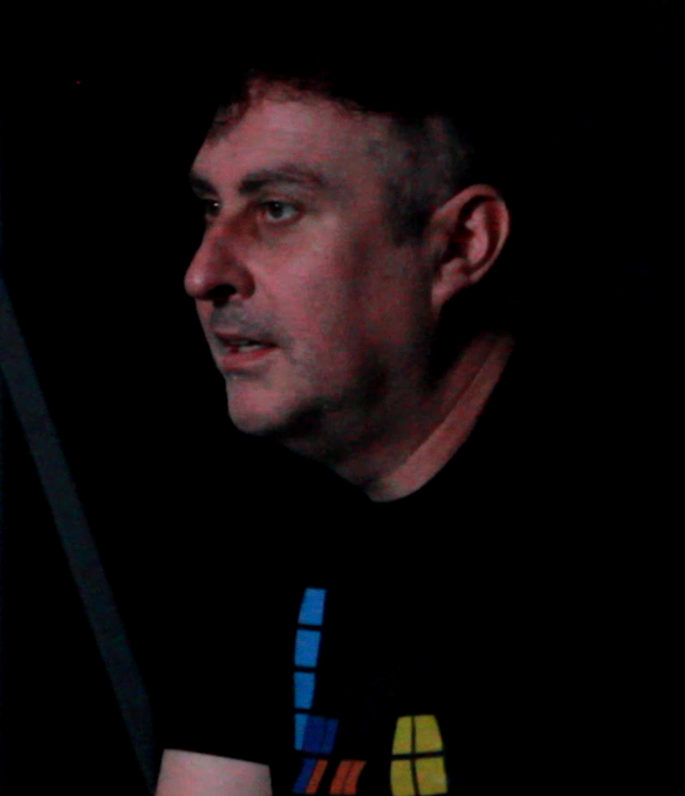
- Aackerlund at CTWC 2022
- Born: Houston, Texas, United States
- Years active: 1990–2012
- Era: 1990s and 2010s
- Known for: 1990 Nintendo World Championships Winner

Competition record

Classic Tetris

Nintendo World Championships
1st	1990 Houston Championship age 12–17
1st	1990 World Finals age 12–17

Classic Tetris World Championship
5th	2010 Tetris World Championship

Thor Aackerlund is an American competitive gamer who rose to prominence after winning the 1990 Nintendo World Championships and is considered a pioneer of modern-day esports.

== Early life ==
As a child, Aackerlund started playing video games while waiting for a new school year to begin after having missed one due to his mother being hospitalized after a fire. He couldn't afford a Nintendo Entertainment System, so he bought a Game Boy but didn't have the money for any extra games, which put him on the path of playing Tetris, as it was included for free.

== Gaming career ==
Aackerlund was one of the winners of the 1990 Nintendo World Championships, for which he won a $10,000 U.S. savings bond, a 1990 Geo Metro Convertible, a 40-inch rear-projection television, and a golden Mario trophy. Soon after the competition, Camerica, a producer of unlicensed Nintendo Entertainment System games, signed a deal with Aackerlund to make him the official spokesman for their games. Aackerlund then became the poster child for the games, featured in commercials and fairs.

Aackerlund felt pressured to play, as the prize money and endorsements were financially important for his family. At the time, he was known as the only player to claim to have reached level 30 in Tetris. Aackerlund soon disappeared from the scene but remained known as perhaps the most well-known name in Tetris prior to the domination of 7-time World Champion Jonas Neubauer.

== Other works ==
Aackerlund is a featured player in the 2011 documentary film Ecstasy of Order: The Tetris Masters, which covers his second effort in competitive video gaming at the 2010 Classic Tetris World Championship.
