= Tetris (NES video game) =

1989 video game

- North American box art
- Developer: Nintendo R&D1
- Publisher: Nintendo
- Series: Tetris
- Platform: Nintendo Entertainment System
- Release: NA: November 1989; EU: February 23, 1990
- Genre: Puzzle
- Mode: Single-player

Tetris is a 1989 puzzle video game developed and published by Nintendo for the Nintendo Entertainment System (NES). Based on Tetris (1985) by Alexey Pajitnov, it was released after a legal battle between Nintendo and Atari Games, who had previously released a console port outside of the terms of their Tetris license. Bullet-Proof Software had previously released Tetris for the Family Computer in December 1988, while Nintendo had released Tetris for the Game Boy earlier in 1989.

Nintendo licensed exclusive home console rights for the Tetris intellectual property from Soviet authorities, leaving Atari Games unaware that they did not possess these rights from their own license. Being forced to quickly recall their version of Tetris for the NES was a major setback to Atari Games and their involved subsidiary Tengen. American reviewers held Nintendo's version to be an inferior product to the recalled Atari Games version.

This Tetris port is unusual because it was designed to end by becoming too fast to play after a certain amount of progress is made. Score must be accumulated through efficient play, rather than pure endurance, before the game ends after a short, predictable timeframe. These characteristics have led to its use as an esports game. Although the highest game speed was intended to be unplayably difficult, it was shown to be manageable with novel button-mashing techniques developed in the 2020s, dramatically extending play sessions.

Though initially overshadowed by its Game Boy counterpart, NES Tetris has had renewed media attention since 2018 after a resurgence in popularity and breakthroughs by young, high-level players, who are now playing for so long that the software behaves erratically.

== Gameplay ==
This version of Tetris has two modes of play: A-Type and B-Type. In A-Type play, the goal is to achieve the highest score. As lines are cleared, the level advances and increases the speed of the falling blocks. In B-Type play, the board starts with randomized obstacle blocks at the bottom of the field, and the goal is to clear 25 lines. The level remains constant, and players choose the height of the obstacle beforehand.

Tetrominoes fill the playing field (center), which is surrounded by various game information and statistics. An A-Type game is shown; the goal is obtain a high score, which is tracked in the top right corner.

During play, the tetrominoes are chosen randomly. This leaves the possibility of extended periods with no long bar pieces, which are essential because clearing four lines at once (known as a "tetris") is worth more than clearing the equivalent amount of lines in singles, doubles, or triples. The next piece to fall is shown in a preview window next to the playfield. In a side panel, the game tracks how many of each tetromino has appeared in the game so far.

In A-Type, the level advances for every 10 lines cleared. Each successive level increases the points scored by line clears and changes the colors of the game pieces. All levels from 1 to 10 increase the game speed. After level 10, the game speed only increases on levels 13, 16, 19, and 29, (Note: This is only the case on the NTSC version of the game. On PAL the last speed change happens at level 19, which is that version's "kill screen".) at which point the speed no longer increases. On level 29, pieces fall at 1 grid cell every frame, which is too fast for almost all players, and it is thus called the "kill screen". The developers of the game never intended anyone to play past the kill screen, as the game does not properly display the level numbers past 29, but with modern speed techniques, skilled players can play past level 29.

When starting a game, players can select a starting level from 0 to 9, but if the A button is held on the controller when selecting a level, 10 additional levels are added, raising the starting options to 0 to 19. When starting on a later level, the level is not supposed to advance until as many lines have been cleared as it would have taken to advance from level 0 to the starting level. Due to a bug, the levels will begin advancing earlier than intended when starting on level 10 or higher.

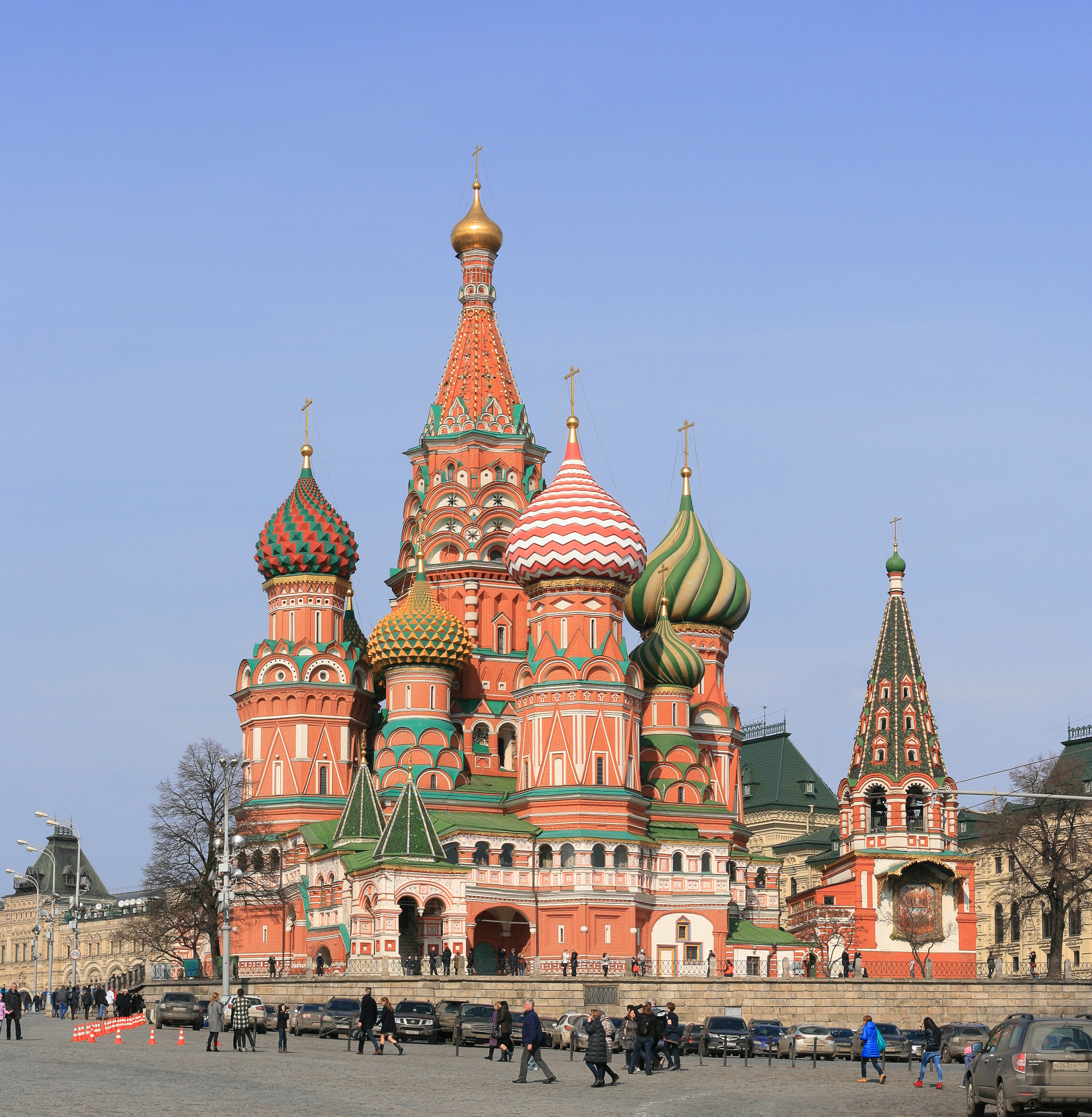
Saint Basil's Cathedral appears in the title screen and ending, alluding to the Soviet origin of Tetris.

At the end of an A-Type game, a substantial score yields an animated ending of a rocket launch in front of Saint Basil's Cathedral. The size of the rocket depends on the score, ranging from a bottle rocket to the Buran spaceplane. In the best ending, a UFO appears on the launch pad and the cathedral lifts off. After a high-level B-Type game, various Nintendo characters perform in front of the cathedral.

The definition of "beating the game" has changed over time with the development of novel controller methods designed for high-level play. After clearing around 1550 lines, the game is at risk of crashing due to inefficient multiplication operations. Crashing the game in this way is popularly considered "beating the game", a feat first achieved on 21 December 2023 by 13-year-old Willis Gibson, known by his online alias "Blue Scuti".

=== Scoring ===
The score received by each line clear is dependent on the level. Each type of clear, being a single, double, triple, or Tetris, has a base value which is multiplied by the number 1 higher than the current level. For any level $n$, a single will give $40(n+1)$ points, a double will give $100(n+1)$ points, a triple will give $300(n+1)$ points, and a Tetris will give $1200(n+1)$ points. The game also awards points for holding the down key to make pieces fall faster, awarding 1 point for every grid cell that a piece is continuously soft dropped. Unlike line clears, this does not scale by level.

This scoring convention makes scoring Tetrises much more efficient than scoring an equivalent amount of lines through smaller line clears. At level 0, a Tetris awards 300 points per line cleared, a triple awards 100 points per line cleared, a double awards 50 points per line cleared, and a single awards 40 points per line cleared. For example, a single in level 0 is worth 40 points and a Tetris worth 1,200 points. A single in level 9 is worth 400 points and a Tetris worth 12,000 points, and a single in level 29 is worth 1,200 points (same as a Tetris on level 0) and a Tetris on level 29 is worth 36,000 points.

== High-level play ==
=== Speed techniques ===
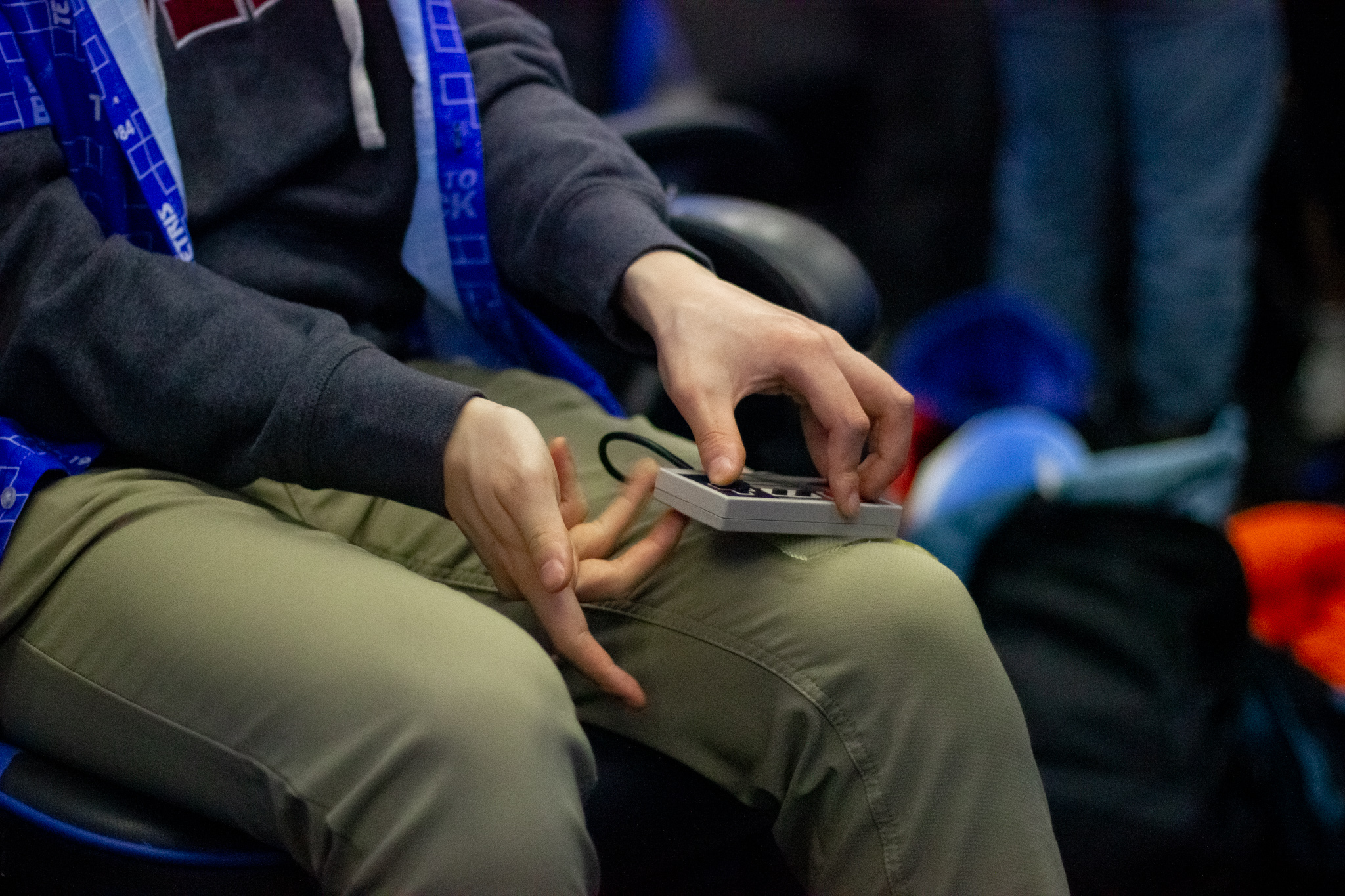
Inputs can be made rapidly by flicking the game controller from behind ("rolling") with as many successive fingers as needed to move the falling game piece to the desired location.

One of the most limiting factors in NES Tetris is the speed at which a tetromino can be moved left and right. On the NTSC version, when a movement key is pressed and held, the piece will instantly move one grid cell, stop for 16 frames due to delayed auto-shift, before moving again once every 6 frames, or 10 times per second. At higher levels, waiting for this delay is not feasible because the pieces fall too fast.

A technique known as "hypertapping" is used to circumvent this delay. When hypertapping, horizontal tetromino speed is maximized by rapidly tapping the D-pad more than 10 times per second. The technique involves flexing the biceps until it tremors, so that the high-speed tremor taps the thumb on the D-pad. Thor Aackerlund was the first hypertapper, but the technique was very rare, with the only top player using it being Japanese player Koji Nishio, known as "Koryan". However it was popularized by Joseph Saelee in 2018 after he won the world championship using hypertapping. Jacob Sweet of The New Yorker described hypertapping as "turning [the] thumb into a jackhammer."

In 2020, the "rolling" technique was developed by competitive NES Tetris player Chris "Cheez_fish" Martinez. When rolling, a stationary finger is placed on the D-pad, while the other hand's fingers are drummed across the back of the controller, pushing the buttons up into the stationary hand. To reduce friction, a glove may be worn on the drumming hand. This technique is both much faster and less physically straining than hypertapping – it allows pieces to be shifted horizontally up to 30 times per second, enabling play far past level 29. Since 2021, numerous world records have been achieved using the rolling technique, and rolling is used in tournaments such as the Classic Tetris World Championship.

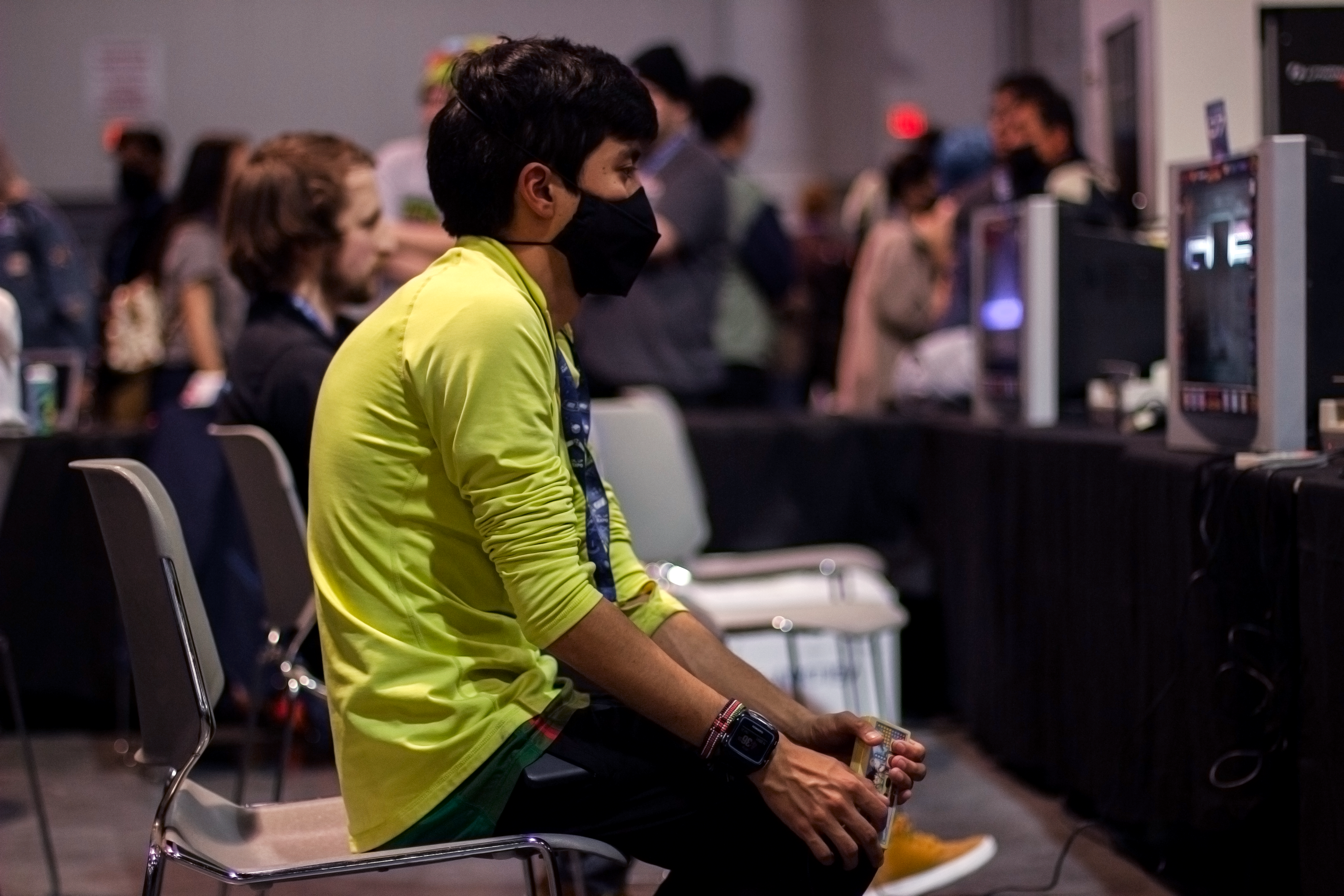
A hypertapper

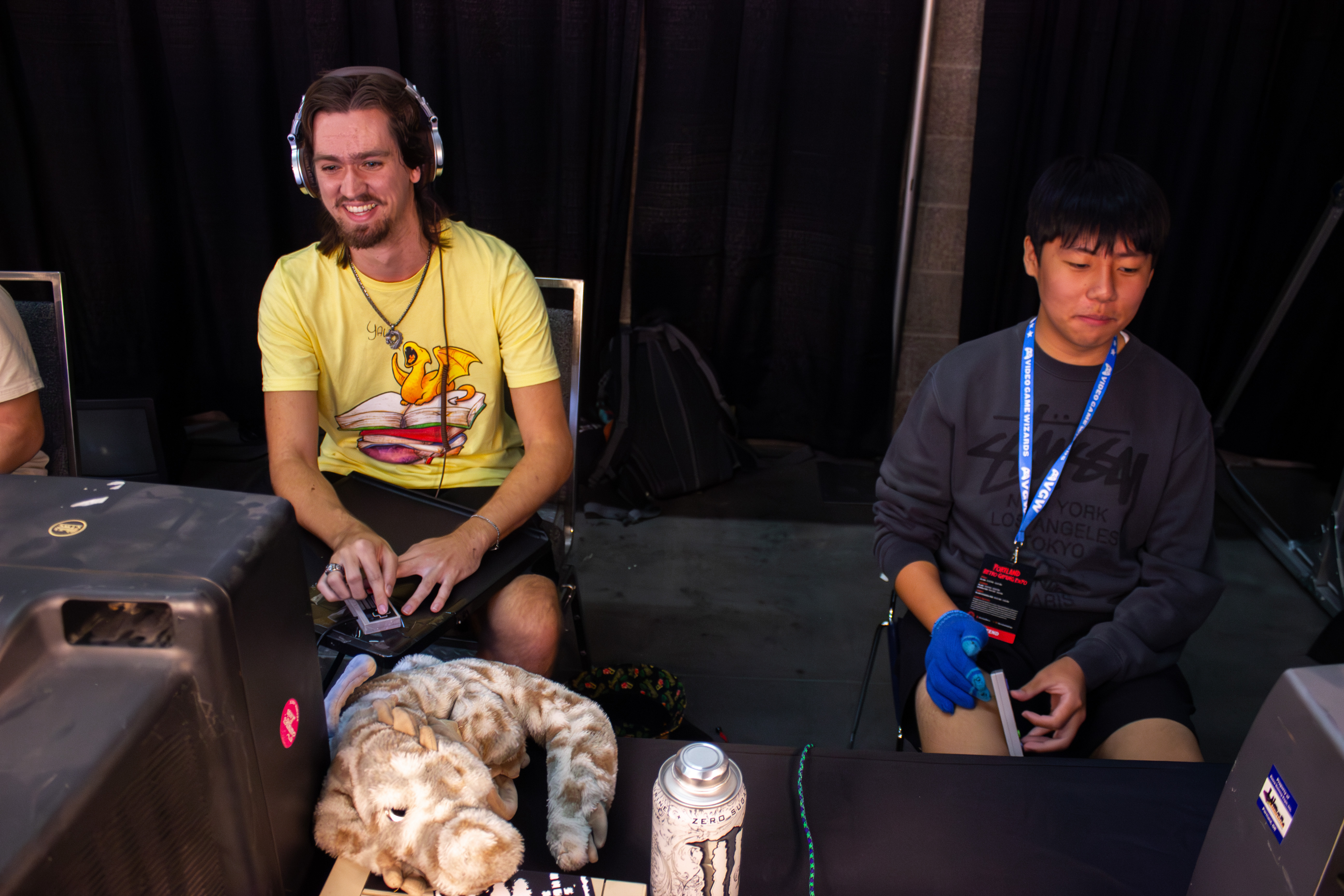
A hypertapper (left) competes with a roller (right)

Video of people rolling

=== History of major achievements ===
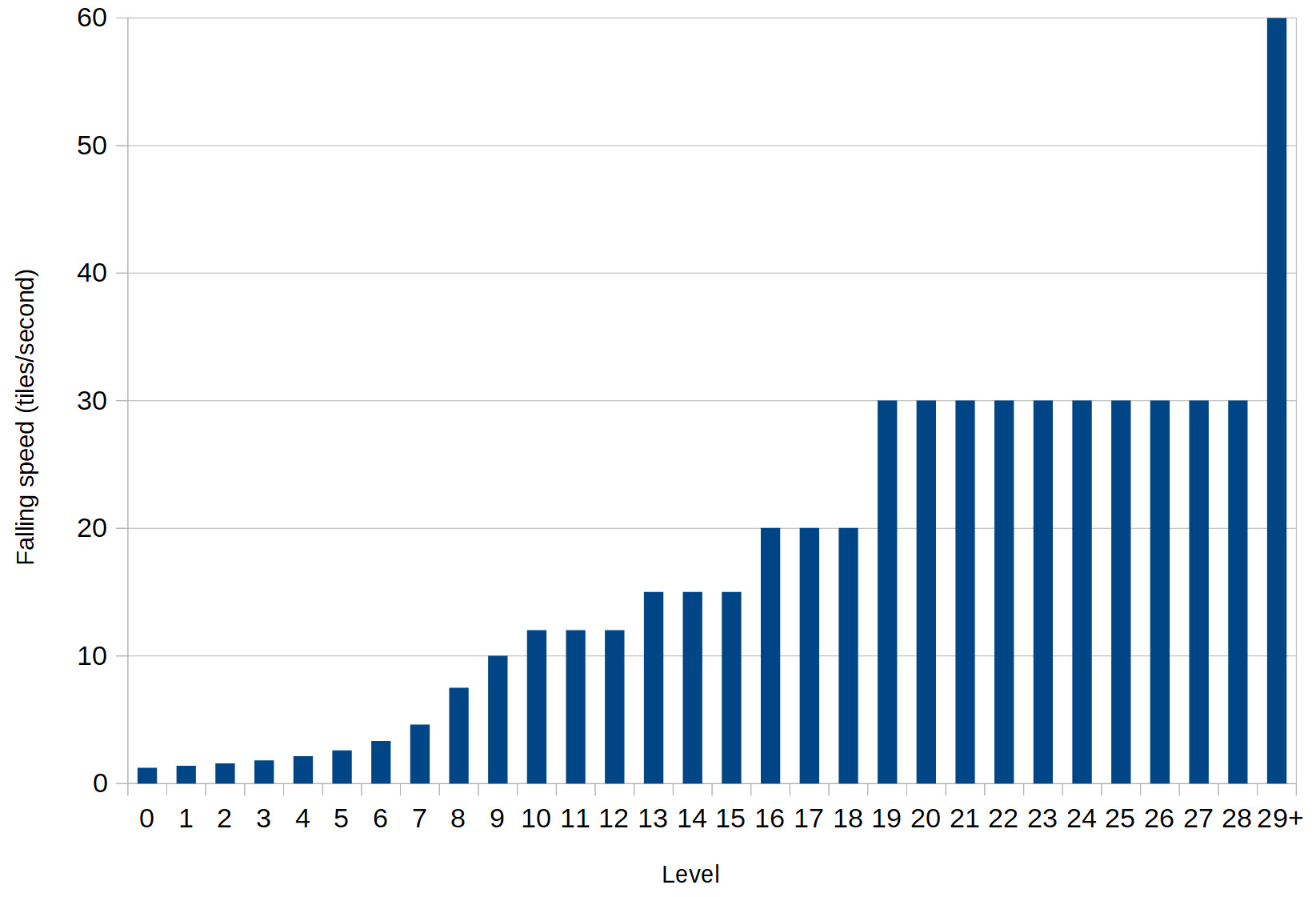
In the North American release, level 29 is associated with an extreme increase in piece gravity.

The game pieces reach their maximum falling speed on level 29 on the NTSC version and 19 on the PAL version, when the speed suddenly doubles. According to The New Yorker, level 29 "seems intentionally impossible—a quick way for developers to end the game." Because of this "soft wall", efficient play was required to accumulate points before level 29 ended the game. In the 2000s, level 29 came to be known as the game's "kill screen" – though this label was found to be a misnomer when the level was passed in the 2010s.

Tetris does not display scores higher than 999,999 points, called a maxout score. Reaching this limit is "just on the brink of possibility" before level 29 ends the game. In 1992, Nintendo Power listed Scott Anderson as having attained this score. Harry Hong produced the first independently verified recording of a maxout game in 2009. Earlier plausible but unverified maxout scores were claimed by Thor Aackerlund c. 1990 and Jonas Neubauer c. 2002.

==== Progression beyond level 29 ====
Aackerlund, a hypertapper, first demonstrated that level 29 could be beaten in 2011; he is shown reaching level 30 in the documentary film Ecstasy of Order: The Tetris Masters. From level 30, the game's level counter stops working correctly, further suggesting that the developers did not believe level 29 could be surpassed. Level 31 was first reached in 2018 by 15-year-old hypertapper Joseph Saelee, and by 2020 hypertappers had gone as far as level 38. Kyle Orland of Ars Technica explains that because of the rolling technique introduced by Martinez in 2020, "players were getting good enough to effectively play indefinitely on the same 'Level 29' speed that had been considered an effective kill screen just a few years earlier."

The final matchup in the Classic Tetris World Championship in 2022 resulted in competitors Eric Tolt and Justin Yu both reaching two million points in a game and levels 73 and 69, respectively. To prevent extremely prolonged games, beginning in 2023, the CTWC uses a modified version that includes a "super killscreen" at level 39, where pieces reach the bottom of the well in only a sixth of a second—two blocks per frame.

==== Technical problems at very high levels ====
The glitched palette of level 146 (Note: The level counter erroneously displays E9 because level 146 is far outside the normal range of levels that were defined by the developers.) (the "dusk" level) is so low contrast that the blocks appear "nigh-invisible". It was not beaten for over a year after it was first reached.

In 2014, computer researcher Mike Birken published an analysis of Tetris' game code, including details on unexpected behaviors that occur at very high levels.

An integer overflow bug is first encountered at level 138, where color palettes would be loaded from unrelated areas of memory, creating unusual and unintended game piece colors. In particular, levels 146 and 148, nicknamed "dusk" and "charcoal", feature black game pieces that are extremely difficult to see against the black background, hindering further progression. Additionally, the score-counting code could crash the game after about 1550 lines are cleared, corresponding to level 155.

External videos
- Explanatory video of the Tetris crash

In December 2023, 13-year-old roller Willis Gibson from Stillwater, Oklahoma, was the first to complete the "charcoal" level 148. He continued playing and reached a game crash at level 157. Because Tetris had been considered unwinnable (due to games necessarily ending with "topping out"), Gibson is credited with being the first person to "beat the game" since its release in 1989. In a statement, Tetris Company CEO Maya Rogers congratulated Gibson for his "feat that defies all preconceived limits" of Tetris. Co-founders Alexey Pajitnov and Henk Rogers met Gibson in January 2024, calling his playthrough an "amazing, amazing achievement".

If one manages to avoid the conditions which crash Tetris, completing level 255 would overflow the level counter back to level 0; a run that overflows the level counter in this way is called a "rebirth" game. Before this level can be reached, players must contend with another bug first encountered at 2190 lines, where an integer underflow prevents the level counter from increasing. The next level is only reached after clearing an additional 810 lines. On October 6, 2024, Michael Artiaga, using a modified crash-resistant version of the game, became the first to complete level 255 and achieve a rebirth game, after which he cleared enough lines to reach what would be level 347 if the level counter had not reset to zero.

=== Esports ===
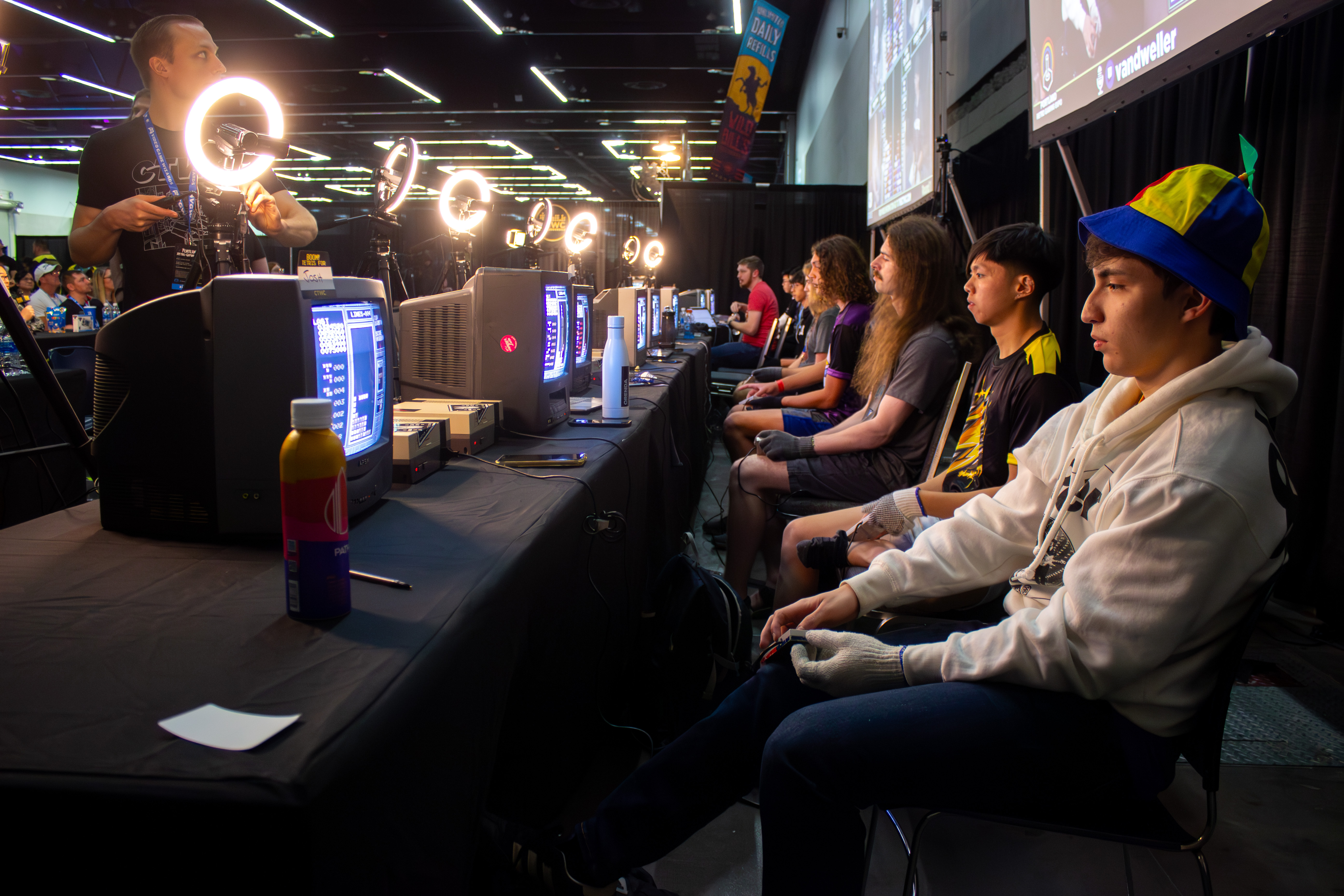
People playing Tetris competitively at the Classic Tetris World Championship in 2023

The 1990 Nintendo World Championships were based on A-Type Tetris, Super Mario Bros., and Rad Racer. In each round, contestants were given a total of six minutes to score as much as possible across all three games. As the Tetris score was multiplied 25 times in the final tally, the prevailing strategy was to rush through the other two games to spend all available time in Tetris.

Since 2010, the NES version of Tetris has been featured in the annual Classic Tetris World Championship (CTWC), which consists of a one-on-one competition to score the most points. Specialized cartridges give both competitors the option to use the same piece sequence.

Since 2017, the tournament Classic Tetris Monthly (CTM) has run monthly with the same one-on-one format as the CTWC. The CTM rules are more relaxed than those of the CTWC, allowing the usage of emulators and third-party hardware. In both the CTWC and CTM, there is a cap at level 39, either by stopping play once level 39 is reached, or by a mod which implements a "Super Killscreen", doubling the drop speed at level 39.

== Development ==
=== Licensing ===
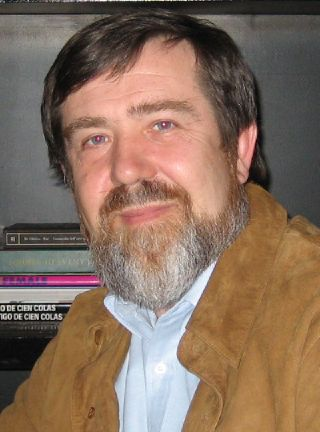
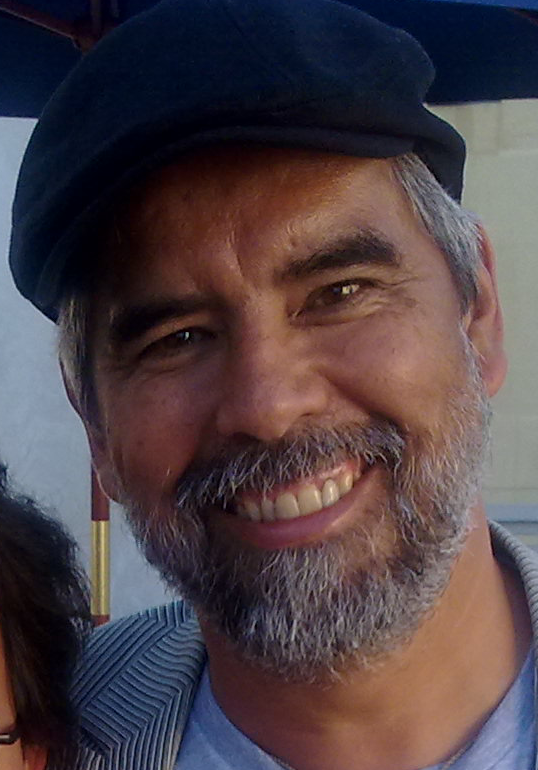
Alexey Pajitnov (left) created the original Tetris in 1985, and Henk Rogers (right) secured the international rights to Tetris for home gaming systems from the ELORG.

Tetris was shown at the January 1988 Consumer Electronics Show in Las Vegas, where it was picked up by Dutch-born American games publisher Henk Rogers, then based in Japan. This eventually led to an agreement brokered with Nintendo where Tetris became a launch game for Game Boy and bundled with every system.

By 1989, about six companies claimed rights to create and distribute the Tetris software for home computers, game consoles, and handheld systems. ELORG, the Soviet bureau that held the ultimate copyright, claimed that none of the companies were legally entitled to produce an arcade version, and signed those rights over to Andromeda Software, who had already and fraudulently sub-licensed them to Atari Games prior to this revised agreement. International handheld rights were signed to Rogers' Bullet-Proof Software, who sub-licensed them to Nintendo to produce a Game Boy version. International console rights were signed over to Nintendo, who sub-licensed Japanese console rights back to Bullet-Proof Software. Nintendo retained the rights to produce their own port of Tetris on home console for sale in other parts of the world.

=== Implementation ===
Pajitnov is credited for the "original concept, design and program" but was not directly involved in developing this version. According to the Video Game History Foundation, the game's color palettes were selected by Howard Phillips.

The NES does not have hardware support for generating random numbers. A pseudo-random number generator was implemented with a 16-bit linear-feedback shift register. The algorithm produces a close, but slightly uneven distribution of the seven types of game pieces; for every 224 pieces, there is one fewer long bar piece than would be expected from an even distribution.

The game's code includes an unfinished and inaccessible two-player versus mode, which sends rows of garbage blocks (with one opening) to the bottom of the opponent's board when lines are cleared. This feature may have been scrapped due to a rushed development schedule, or to promote sales of the Game Link Cable which enables a two-player mode in Nintendo's Game Boy Tetris.

=== Music ===
Focusing on Russian classical music, the soundtrack features arrangements of "The Dance of the Sugar Plum Fairy" from Pyotr Ilyich Tchaikovsky's ballet The Nutcracker and the overture from Georges Bizet's opera Carmen. The former replaces the arrangement of "Korobeiniki", present in the Game Boy version, which has become strongly associated with Tetris.

== Release ==
Reception

Review scores
Publication	Score
AllGame	4.5/5
Aktueller Software Markt	8.2/12

Tetris was marketed extensively for the 1989 Christmas season. Television advertising used the slogan "You've been Tetris-ized!", referring to the Tetris effect. The tagline "From Russia with fun!" appears on the game's cover, referencing From Russia, with Love by Ian Fleming. Nintendo emphasized its exclusive home console license in marketing directed at retailers, stating "No other company in the world is now, nor has ever been, licensed to market the Tetris home video game title."

In its first six months of release by 1990, Nintendo's NES version of Tetris had sales of 1.5 million copies totaling $52 million (equivalent to $135 million in 2025), surpassing Spectrum HoloByte's versions for personal computers at 150,000 copies for $6 million (equivalent to $16.3 million in 2025) in the previous two years since 1988. By 2004, 8 million copies of the NES version were sold worldwide.

In 1991, Tetris was included as a pack-in game with some European NES consoles. Unlike the Game Boy version, the NES release was not made available for purchase on Nintendo's Virtual Console. In 2024 Tetris was released on the Nintendo Classics service.

== Reception ==
IGN noted that "almost everyone" regarded Nintendo's Tetris as inferior to Atari's Tetris, which was pulled from shelves due to licensing issues. Computer Entertainer recommended Nintendo's Tetris only to consumers who had not played Atari's version, which it says has superior graphics, gameplay and options – further calling its removal from stores "unfortunate for players" of puzzle games. Electronic Gaming Monthly called Atari's version "more playable and in-depth" than Nintendo's.

The German gaming magazine Aktueller Software Markt considered the game a success, praising the adjustable starting level and music. The review held the graphics to be adequate, noting that they do not overwhelm the senses.

== Legacy ==
Tetris & Dr. Mario (1994) features an enhanced remake of Tetris. Tetris Effect: Connected (2020) includes a game mode that simulates the rules and visuals of Tetris for the NES.

The events that lead to Nintendo acquiring the license to publish a Tetris game for consoles are explained in BBC's TV documentary Tetris: From Russia with Love (2004), as well as a dramatic retelling in Tetris (2023).

Since 2018, Nintendo's Tetris has experienced a resurgence in popularity with a younger audience. In 2020, more people attained a maxout score than from 1990 to 2019 combined.

=== Use in research ===
In 2018, eleven classic Tetris experts were instructed to play with the next piece preview window disabled ("no next box"). Their average score was found to drop dramatically, from 465,371 in control games to 6,457 with no next box. The author notes that even though one participant went on to become that year's world champion, no player was recorded scoring a Tetris during any of the games without next boxes.

In a 2023 study, 160 people were recorded playing classic Tetris. The recordings suggested that novice players blink less than usual while playing Tetris, whereas experienced players remained closer to their normal blinking rate. The study concludes that a person's Tetris ability can be assessed by their blink rate during the first minute of play. In contrast, seven-time world champion Jonas Neubauer manually suppressed his blink reflex while playing, leading to health concerns and his regular use of eye drops.
