= Willis Gibson =

American Tetris player (born 2010)

Blue Scuti
- Gibson at the 2026 World Championship

Personal information
- Name: Willis Gibson
- Born: January 27, 2010 (age 16)

Career information
- Games: Classic Tetris
- Playing career: 2021–present

Career highlights and awards
- 3× World Championship semifinalist (2023, 2025, 2026); 1× DAS World Cup third place (2025); 2× DAS Jonas Cup runner-up (2024, 2026); 7× Regional winner (2023–2025); 12× Masters winner (2023–2026); 1× DAS Masters winner (2026); First to "beat" NES Tetris (2023); Oklahoma Sports Hall of Fame

Willis Gibson (born January 27, 2010), also known online as Blue Scuti, is an American classic NES Tetris player from Stillwater, Oklahoma. He is best known for becoming the first person to "beat the game" of Tetris on December 21, 2023, after he triggered a game crash on the previously unreached level 157.

Gibson became interested in Tetris at age 11 after watching related content on YouTube. He soon after began to play the game competitively using the rolling technique, and placed third in his first Classic Tetris World Championship (CTWC) two years later in 2023. Gibson has since competed in three additional CTWCs, placing third in each of his last two appearances.

The game crash achievement brought Gibson international attention, and has since kept him ingrained in Tetris pop culture through interviews by The New York Times and Good Morning America, meet-ups with celebrities like Logan Paul, a documentary around his game crash, and a spot in the Oklahoma Sports Hall of Fame. In addition to "beating the game", Gibson is regarded as one of the best American Tetris players.

== Personal life ==
Gibson was born on January 27, 2010, to Karin Cox, herself a gamer and high-school math teacher, and Adam Gibson. Upon showing interest in playing Tetris competitively, both of Gibson's parents were supportive. Shortly after attending Gibson's first live tournament victory at the 2023 CTWC Kansas City Regionals, Gibson's father, Adam, died from a heart attack on December 14, 2023. With his death only about one week before the game crash, Gibson dedicated the achievement to his father, and further stated he "wouldn't have" been able to make the achievement without continued support from his mother. In an interview with WFAA in February 2024, Gibson stated he's brought a keepsake plush with the words "I Love You Dad" written on the back of it to each tournament he's competed in since.

Aside from Tetris and other retro games, Gibson's hobbies include playing at the arcade, bowling, cycling, and solving Rubik's cubes. He has stated that he does not want his Tetris career to interfere with his education, and that he plans to use any prize money or other related earnings to pay for college. Relating to retro games, Gibson has stated his interest in someday playing Super Mario Bros. at a competitive level.

== Tetris career ==
=== Background ===
Gibson began to play classic NES Tetris in 2021 when he was 11 years old after watching content relating to it on YouTube. Before Tetris, Gibson had shown an interest in gaming from around 5 years old, playing other video games like Geometry Dash, Minecraft, and Rocket League. After showing greater interest towards Tetris, however, his mother acquired a RetroN console from a pawnbroker and a CRT display her workplace had discarded for Gibson to play on. Playing the game started out as "mainly a hobby", according to Gibson in a 2023 interview, but later grew into competitive play online and against others. He eventually began to livestream under the gaming name "Blue Scuti", referring to the star UY Scuti.

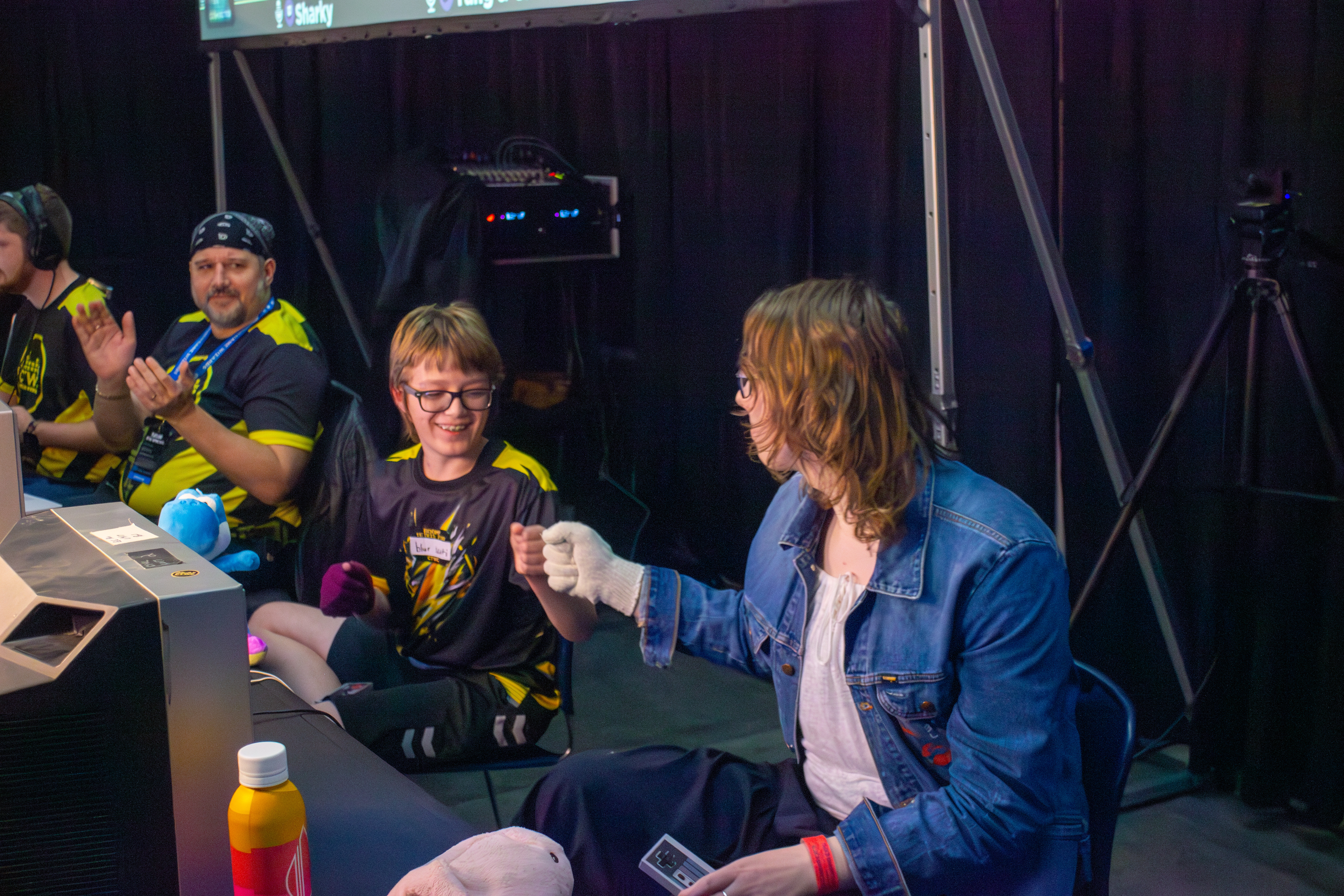
Gibson at age 13, with opponent Eve Commandeur ("Sidnev") at the 2023 Classic Tetris World Championship semifinals.

Before his game crash achievement, Gibson competed in several tournaments: most notably the Classic Tetris World Championship (CTWC) in October 2023, in which he placed third and won a cash prize of US$1,500. At 13 years old, Gibson was also one of the event's youngest competitors. The first major event Gibson won came later on December 2, 2023, at the 2023 CTWC Kansas City Regionals, where he additionally received a championship apron.

=== Game crash achievement ===
After the CTWC in October 2023, Gibson began his attempt to be the first to "beat the game", a point late in the game when its code glitches and displays a game crash due to hardware limitations within the Nintendo Entertainment System (NES). This game crash had only previously been reached by AI and tool assistance. Gibson was inspired by fellow competitive Tetris player and YouTuber Justin Yu (known online as "Fractal161"), who announced his intentions to reach the game crash after the CTWC. To improve his skills in the late-game phase, Gibson practiced playing "Dusk" and "Charcoal", two levels considered to be the hardest in the game because of their dark and distorted hues of the blocks caused by a late-game memory glitch.

I'm going to pass out, I can't feel my fingers.

— Willis Gibson, just after becoming the first person to trigger a game crash on the NES version of Tetris

On December 21, 2023, Gibson became the first person on the NES version of Tetris to "beat the game" after reaching level 157 and triggering the game crash. The record playthrough lasted 38 minutes and was uploaded to Gibson's YouTube channel on January 2, 2024, under the title "The First Time Somebody Has Ever 'Beat' Tetris". The playthrough was also the highest overall scoring game of Tetris at the time of recording.

The achievement attracted widespread media attention. Only a day after the achievement was posted to YouTube, The New York Times interviewed Gibson, and Good Morning America broadcast excerpts of his video. A clip of Gibson breathing heavily and repeatedly exclaiming, "Oh, my God!" at the moment of the crash was circulated widely, and on January 5, 2024, Gibson's post-victory reaction quote, "I can't feel my fingers", became The New York Times quote of the day. In a statement, Tetris Company CEO Maya Rogers congratulated Gibson for his "feat that defies all preconceived limits" of the game. President of the CTWC, Vince Clemente, remarked: "It's basically something that everyone thought was impossible" and that the whole event "is unbelievable". Tetris co-founders Alexey Pajitnov and Henk Rogers also met with Gibson over a video call, calling his playthrough an "amazing, amazing achievement." Gibson later met the two creators in person on June 6, 2024, at a special anniversary event in Los Angeles.

The American monthly magazine Wired credited the unexpectedly large media attention of the achievement to a recent "cultural obsession" of Tetris, restarting in 2023 with the release of the Tetris film, and an uptick in generally negative news starting off the New Year in 2024. Likewise, the media's reception of Gibson remained largely positive in their coverage. An exception, however, came from Sky News presenter Jayne Secker, who remarked on air that "as a mother, I would just say step away from the screen, go outside, get some fresh air" and that "beating Tetris is not a life goal". Secker's comments attracted considerable backlash.

=== Recent history ===
On January 20, 2024, Gibson competed at the Heart of Texas tournament in Waco. Though he was defeated in the semifinals, a "surge in attention and popularity" at the tournament was attributed to him and the crowd "grew each time Gibson was competing".

On January 23, 2024, American YouTuber and author John Green announced that Complexly, a media production company co-founded by Green, would sponsor Gibson. In May 2024, Gibson was inducted into the Oklahoma Sports Hall of Fame, and the equipment used in the game crash playthrough was loaned to the Hall of Fame museum for a temporary exhibit.

From June 7–9, 2024, Gibson again competed in the CTWC. After tying the previous year's record of 16 maxouts and thereby securing seed 1, Gibson was ultimately eliminated early, losing to Tristan Kwai (known online as "Tristop") in the quarterfinals, who in turn lost next round to the eventual champion Alex Thach (known online as "Alex T"). As a side event during the CTWC, Gibson competed against YouTuber and wrestler Logan Paul. Paul, who enjoyed the game but never played competitively, was quickly beat by Gibson, who he referred to as "a Tetris legend, [and] a pop culture icon". Paul's entrance to the event was additionally kept as a surprise until shortly before, as he was missing a WWE Smackdown event to attend.

From June 6–8, 2025, Gibson again competed in the CTWC, this time losing in semifinals to repeat champion Alex Thach. On the first day of the CTWC, June 6, it was announced that Legendary Entertainment had started production on a documentary titled Blue Scuti: Tetris Crasher. The documentary, being written and directed by Chris Moukarbel, was stated to be a coming-of-age story focused on Gibson's game crash achievement. The documentary, with a runtime of one hour and 16 minutes, also featured appearances from other competitive Tetris players including Justin Yu. Upon hearing he would be the subject of a documentary Gibson was surprised, stating it was "not something I thought would ever happen". The documentary premiered on June 11, 2025, at the Tribeca Festival in New York City, with Gibson and Tetris Company CEO Maya Rodgers in attendance. Reception to the documentary from critics upon its release was mixed. Samantha McLaren, as associate editor with MovieJawn, referred to the documentary as "heartwarming and thrilling", with footage from past CTWC's in the film being "as nail-biting as any major league sports game". Conversely, Scott Clark, a reviewer with The Gaming Outsider, stated while there was a good ending message and "some interesting elements", the documentary was too long, not engaging in its worldbuilding, and did not have enough to talk about to be entertaining.

== Playing style ==
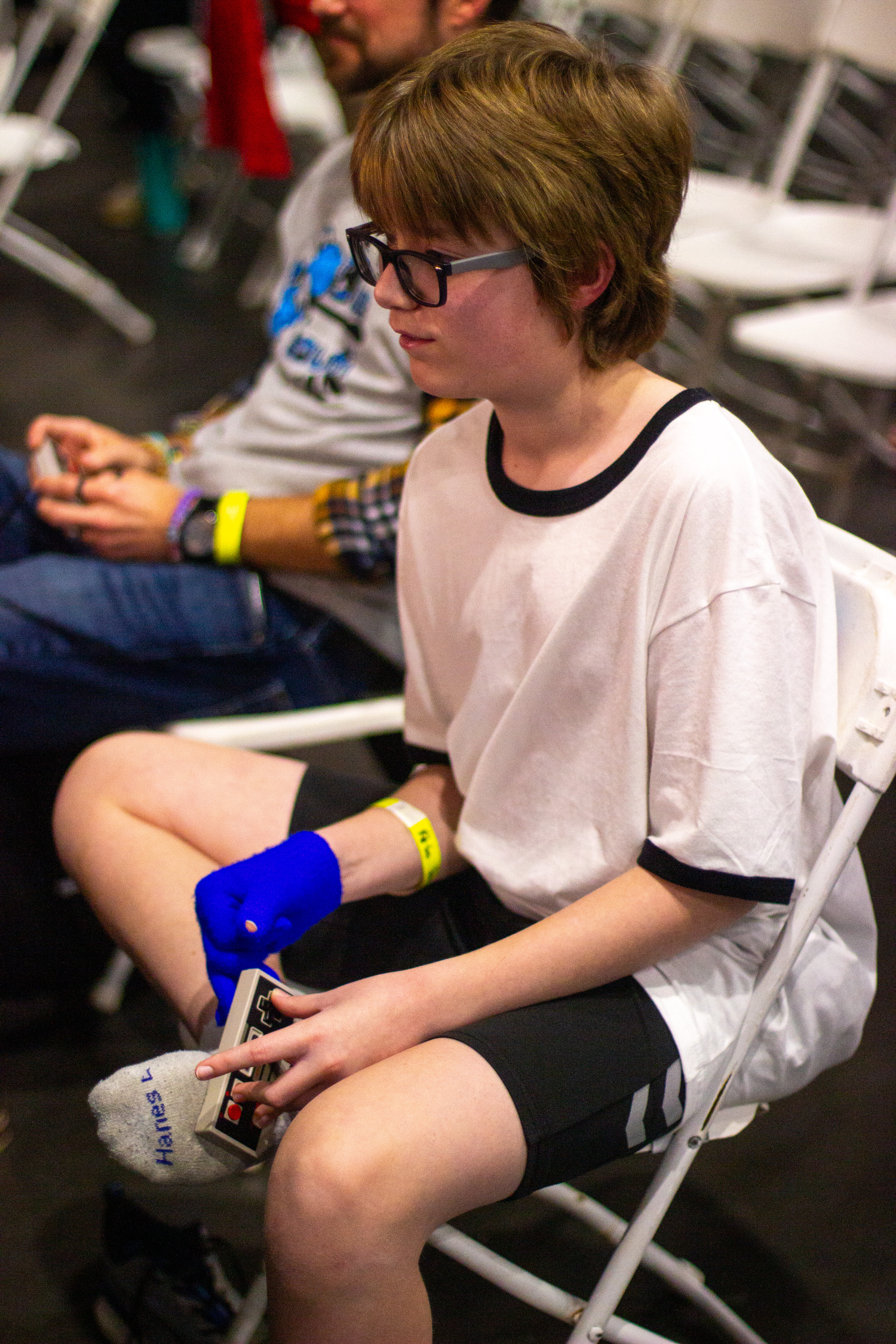
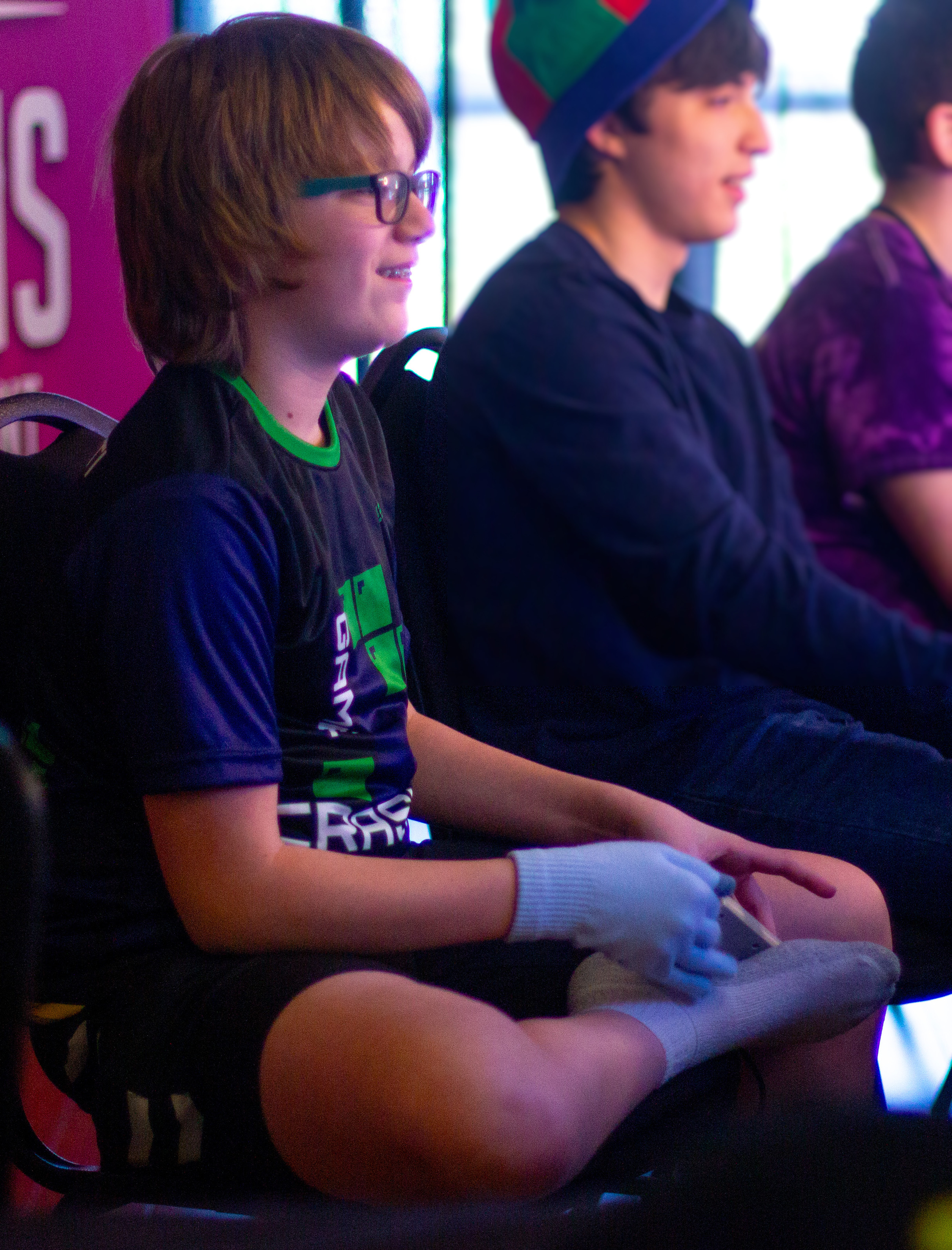
While playing Tetris, Gibson holds the game controller between his left knee and right foot. He drums on the back of the controller with his right hand fingers, rapidly pushing the buttons into his left hand.

Gibson's playing style was described as "aggressive" by Stillwater News Press. He first learned to play the game using the hypertapping technique in 2021, but when the faster rolling technique was discovered, his playing style changed to it instead. The combination of skill, aggression, and mastery of the rolling technique was credited to Gibson's ability to perform well in the game. For his set-up, Gibson often plays with the controller on his right foot balanced against his left knee, with his right hand performing the rolling and tapping actions. He wears a glove on his right hand to reduce the friction of the repeated actions, a common strategy for rollers.

== Competitive record ==
This table lists notable Classic Tetris tournaments in which Gibson competed in and their outcomes. It includes any appearances at the CTWC World Championship, CTWC DAS Jonas Cup, CTWC DAS World Cup, CTM Mega Masters, as well as high placings at related tournaments, such as reaching at least semifinals in other CTWC or CTM events. CTM results prior to 2022 only list the winner and runner-up, and information may be incomplete.

Competitive record of Willis Gibson in Classic Tetris
Year	Tournament	Size	Seed	Score	Place	Ref.
2022	CTM March Futures	16	13	2–1	3rd–4th	
2022	CTM April Community	16	2	3–1	2nd	
2023	CTM March Challengers	16	3	2–1	3rd–4th	
2023	CTM April Mega Masters	78	26^{†}	1–1	17th–32nd	
2023	CTWC World Championship	48	4^{†}	3–1	3rd–4th	
2023	CTM October Challengers	16	1	4–0	1st	
2023	CTWC Kansas	12	1^{†}	3–0	1st	
2023	CTM December Masters	16	1	4–0	1st	
2024	CTWC Texas (Note: "Heart of Texas")	12	3^{†}	1–1	3rd–4th	
2024	CTM Level 12 (Note: level 12 starts only)	12	1^{†}	3–0	1st	
2024	CTWC Genesis (Note: hosted concurrently with the Super Smash Bros. tournament of the same name)	12	4^{†}	2–1	3rd	
2024	CTWC Phoenix	12	1^{†}	3–0	1st	
2024	CTM March Mega Masters	64	3	4–1	3rd–4th	
2024	CTWC France	28	1^{‡}	2–1	2nd	
2024	CTM May Masters	16	5	3–1	2nd	
2024	CTWC World Championship	48	1^{†}	2–1	5th–8th	
2024	CTWC Philadelphia	16	2	2–1	3rd–4th	
2024	CTM Lone Star (Note: held in-person, CTM Texas regional)	16	1	4–0	1st	
2024	CTM Lone Star DAS	16	3	2–1	3rd–4th	
2024	CTM July Masters	16	5	3–1	2nd	
2024	CTWC Kansas	12	2^{†}	3–0	1st	
2024	CTWC Kansas DAS	12	1^{†}	2–1	2nd	
2024	CTM August Masters	16	6	3–1	2nd	
2024	CTWC DAS Jonas Cup (Note: in memory of Jonas Neubauer)	48	8^{†}	4–1	2nd	
2024	CTM September Masters	16	1	4–0	1st	
2024	CTWC Stillwater	12	2^{†}	3–0	1st	
2024	CTWC Stillwater DAS	14	4	2–1	3rd–4th	
2024	CTM October Masters	16	6	4–0	1st	
2024	CTM November Masters (Note: "No Cap November", level 39 super killscreen disabled)	16	5	3–1	2nd	
2025	CTM January Masters	32	1^{‡}	4–0	1st	
2025	CTM February Masters (Note: "Faster Masters", level 19 starts only)	32	4^{‡}	4–0	1st	
2025	CTM March Masters	32	2^{‡}	2–1	3rd–4th	
2025	CTM April Mega Masters	64	4^{‡}	4–1	3rd	
2025	CTWC World Championship	48	12^{†}	3–1	3rd–4th	
2025	CTWC DAS World Cup (Note: "CTWC DAS: The World Cup of DAS", held in Cologne, Germany)	48	6^{‡}	3–2	3rd	
2025	CTWC Houston DAS (Note: "Space City")	15	2	4–0	1st	
2025	CTWC Houston	16	2	3–1	2nd	
2025	CTWC Kansas City	12	1^{†}	3–0	1st	
2025	CTWC Kansas City DAS	16	1	2–1	3rd–4th	
2025	CTWC DAS Jonas Cup	48	8^{†}	2–1	5th–8th	
2025	CTM October Masters	32	5^{‡}	4–0	1st	
2025	CTM October DAS Mega Masters	64	6^{‡}	1–1	9th–16th	
2025	CTM November Masters	32	1^{‡}	4–0	1st	
2025	CTM December Masters	32	1^{‡}	4–0	1st	
2026	CTM January Masters	32	2^{‡}	4–0	1st	
2026	CTM January DAS Masters	32	10^{†}	5–0	1st	
2026	CTM February Masters	32	1^{‡}	4–0	1st	
2026	CTM March Masters	32	4^{‡}	4–0	1st	

Event host
CTWC	Classic Tetris World Championship	held in-person (Note: unless indicated otherwise by a footnote)
CTM	Classic Tetris Monthly	held online

Default wins
^{†}	single-dagger symbol	high seed after qualifying round, awarding a single bye
^{‡}	double-dagger symbol	high seed after qualifying round, awarding a double bye
