= Jonas Neubauer =

American classic Tetris player (1981–2021)

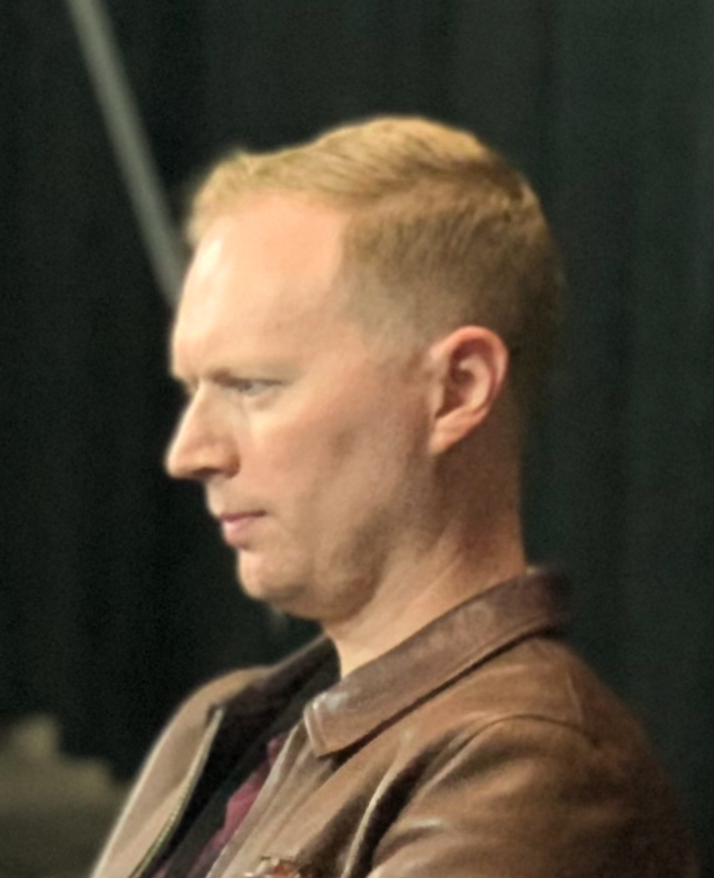
- Neubauer at the 2018 Classic Tetris World Championship

Personal information
- Nickname(s): nubbinsgoody, Bunbun
- Born: Jonas Evan Neubauer; April 19, 1981; Redondo Beach, California, U.S.
- Died: January 5, 2021 (aged 39); Kaʻaʻawa, Hawaii

Career information
- Games: Classic Tetris
- Playing career: 1999–2021

Career highlights and awards
- 7× World Championship winner (2010–2013, 2015–2017); 2× World Championship runner-up (2014, 2018); 2× Highscore world record (2000, 2018)

Jonas Evan Neubauer (April 19, 1981 – January 5, 2021) was an American Tetris player, Twitch streamer, and taproom manager. Winning seven championships at the Classic Tetris World Championships, Neubauer is widely considered to be one of the greatest Tetris players of all time.

== Tetris career ==
=== Background ===
Neubauer began playing Tetris at age 6 or 7 on his uncle's Compact Macintosh computer. As the first video game he played, he recounts seeing it as "the most awesome thing", and he dedicated "this entire side of [his] brain" to it. At age 9, he bought the NES version with his allowance and was able to score 176,000 points.

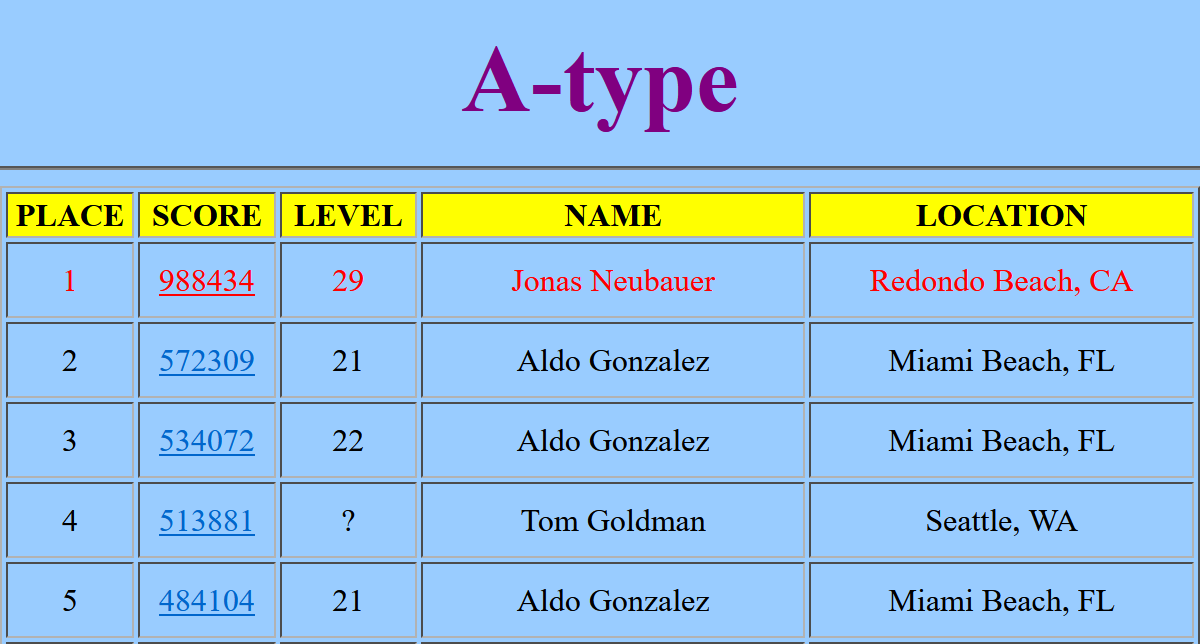
An early Tetris fansite scoreboard lists Neubauer as world record holder.

By his senior year of high school, Neubauer could score 500,000 to 700,000 points, impressing his peers. To improve further, he analyzed recordings of his play using probability matrices and refined his use of the "DAS" (delayed auto-shift) style of play. In the early 2000s, he posted some of these recordings to the internet, including a photo of a 980,000 score. During this time, he competed with Nintendo World Championships runner-up Rich Ambler for high scores.

Neubauer first claimed to have attained a maxout score of 999,999 points on March 23, 2001. In around 2002, Neubauer recorded a maxout game and posted it online, but it was initially received with skepticism because it did not include audio. The score could not be certified at the time, and no other maxout game would be documented until Harry Hong's in 2009.

=== Ecstasy of Order (2010) ===
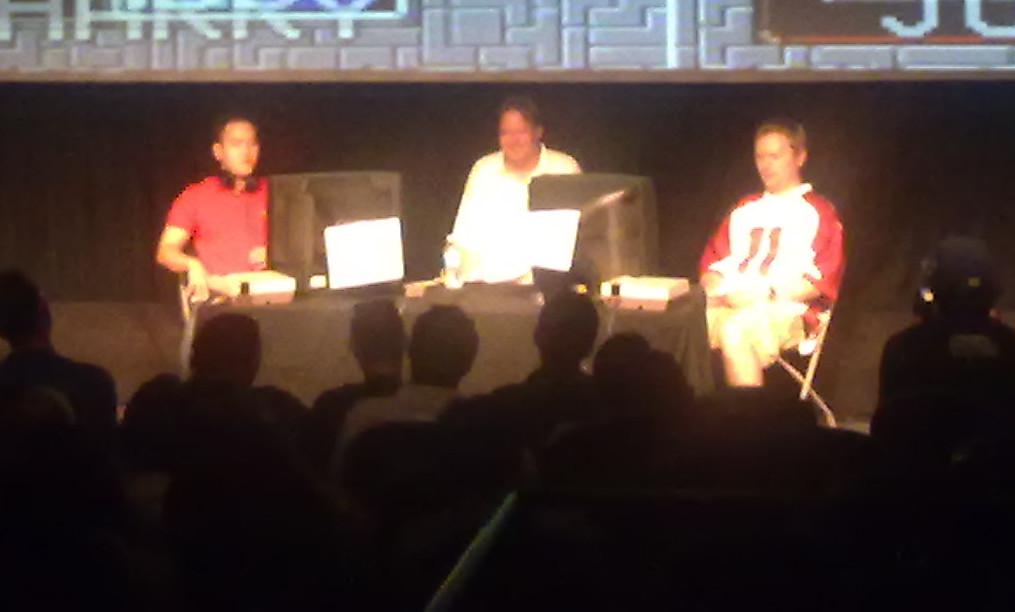
Neubauer (right) at CTWC 2010, playing against Harry Hong

Neubauer was contacted in 2010 by filmmaker Adam Cornelius, who had seen the recorded maxout-scoring game that Neubauer shared online years earlier. Cornelius invited Neubauer to participate in his documentary film Ecstasy of Order: The Tetris Masters, which was set to include a tournament in Neubauer's hometown of Los Angeles.

Due to his achievement, Neubauer was one of five people given reserved spots in the tournament, to be called the Classic Tetris World Championship. Among his opponents, he was particularly concerned about Harry Hong and Trey Harrison, who had both posted recordings of very high-scoring games. Despite this, Neubauer was confident he would win.

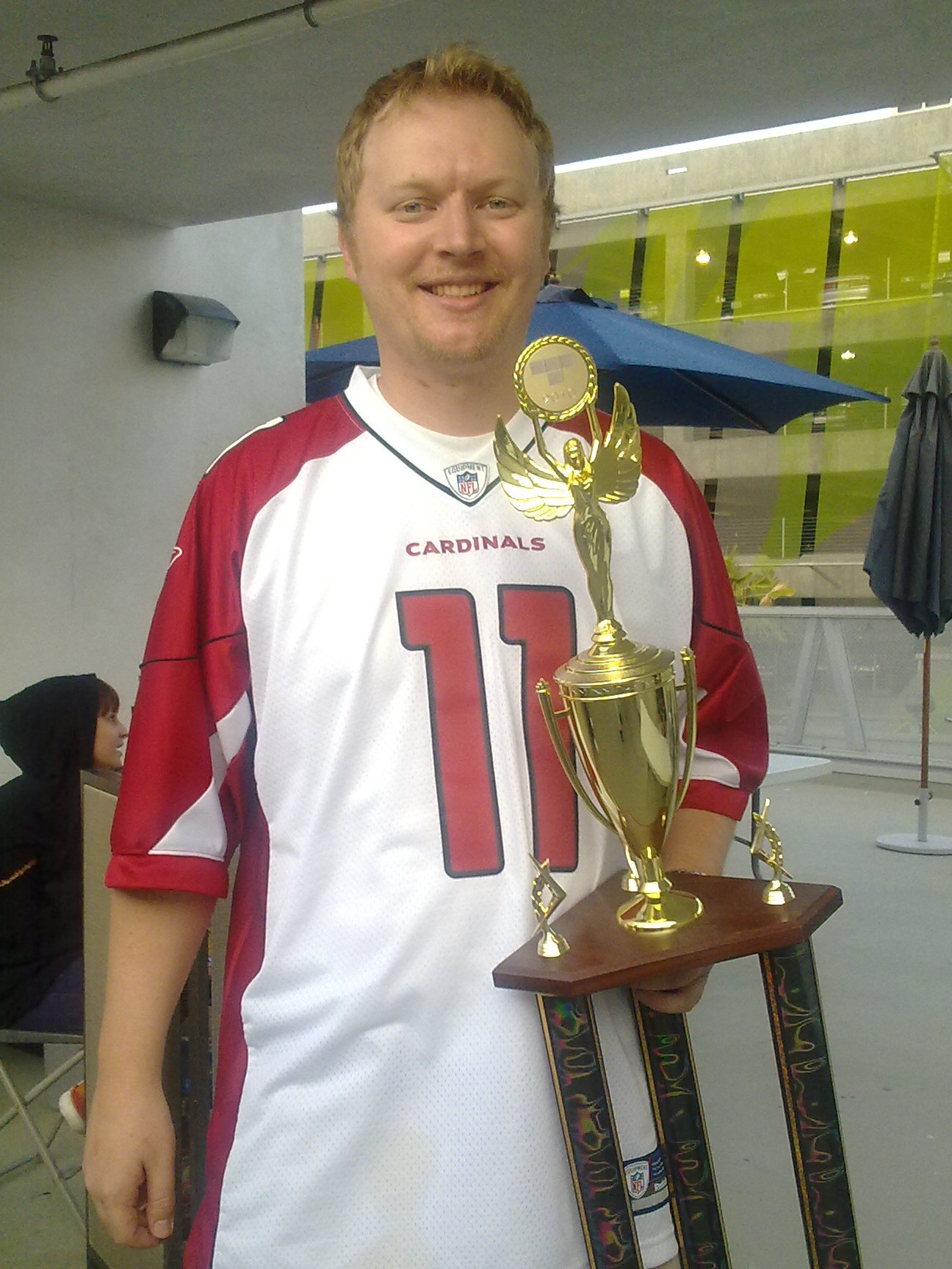
Neubauer after winning CTWC 2010

Neubauer advanced to the final, where he defeated Hong 2–0 to become the first world Tetris champion.

=== Continued success in early tournaments (2011–17) ===
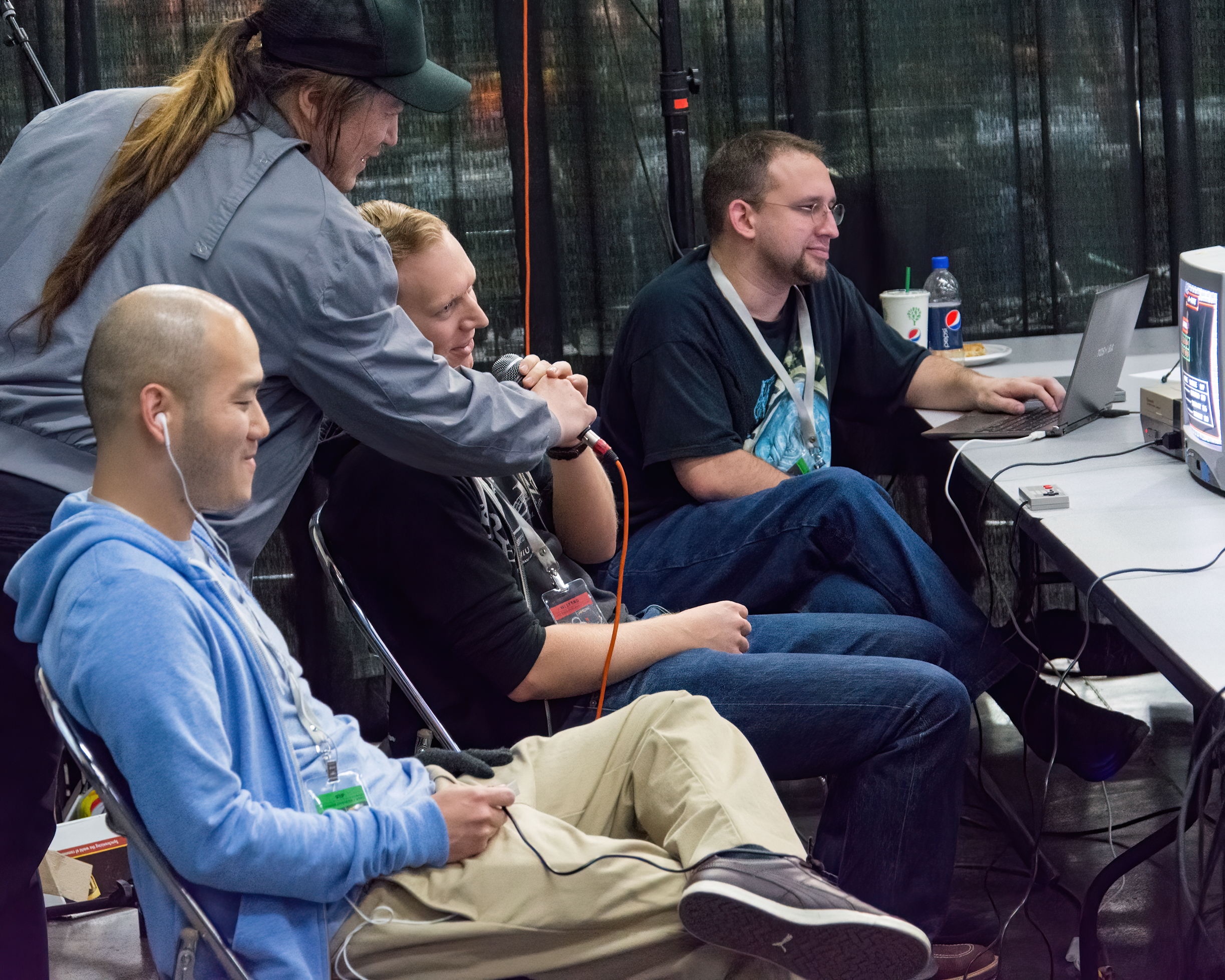
Neubauer with Harry Hong (foreground) at the CTWC 2013 final

In 2011, Neubauer successfully defended his title after defeating Alex Kerr 2–0 in the finals. In 2012, Neubauer successfully defended his title for the second time after defeating Mike Winzineck 3–0 in the finals. In 2013, Neubauer was once again able to defend his title for the third time, defeating rival Harry Hong 3–2 after being down 0–2. This marked the first time Neubauer lost a round in the finals and made him a 4-time Classic World Tetris champion and the sole champion of the competition up until this point.

Neubauer participated again in 2014, looking to defend his title for the fifth straight time. Neubauer made it to the finals, setting up a rematch with the previous year's finalist Harry Hong. Despite taking an early 1–0 lead, Neubauer was defeated 3–1 by Hong. This marked the first time Neubauer was defeated in competition, and it was Harry Hong's only Classic Tetris World Championship victory. After the tournament, Neubauer contemplated retirement but was convinced to keep competing by his wife.

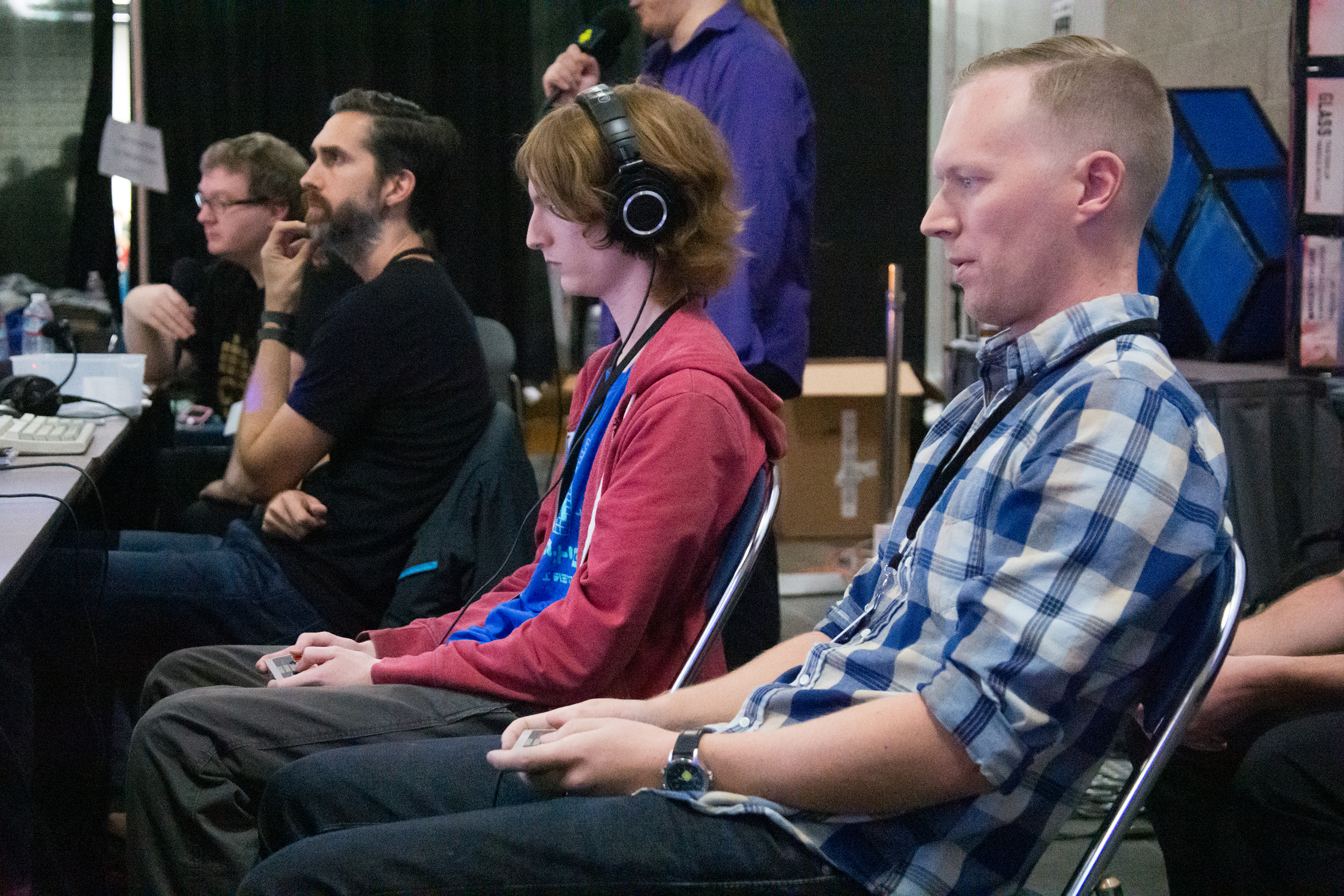
Neubauer faces Alex Kerr at CTWC 2015.

In 2015, Neubauer returned to the competition motivated to claim his fifth title. He was once again able to reach the finals, where he defeated surprise finalist Sean "Quaid" Ritchie 3–1, successfully reclaiming the title after the previous year's defeat. Neubauer won his sixth title in 2016 after defeating first-time finalist Jeff Moore 3–1, in what was once considered as the most popular Classic World Tetris Championship match in the competition's history, sparking renewed interest in the game and the competition. In 2017, Neubauer won his seventh title after defeating former finalist Alex Kerr 3–0 in the finals. Neubauer dropped only one game during the entirety of the competition during the quarterfinals against veteran Chad Muse. This was Neubauer's final title in the competition.

=== Final competition years (2018–20) ===
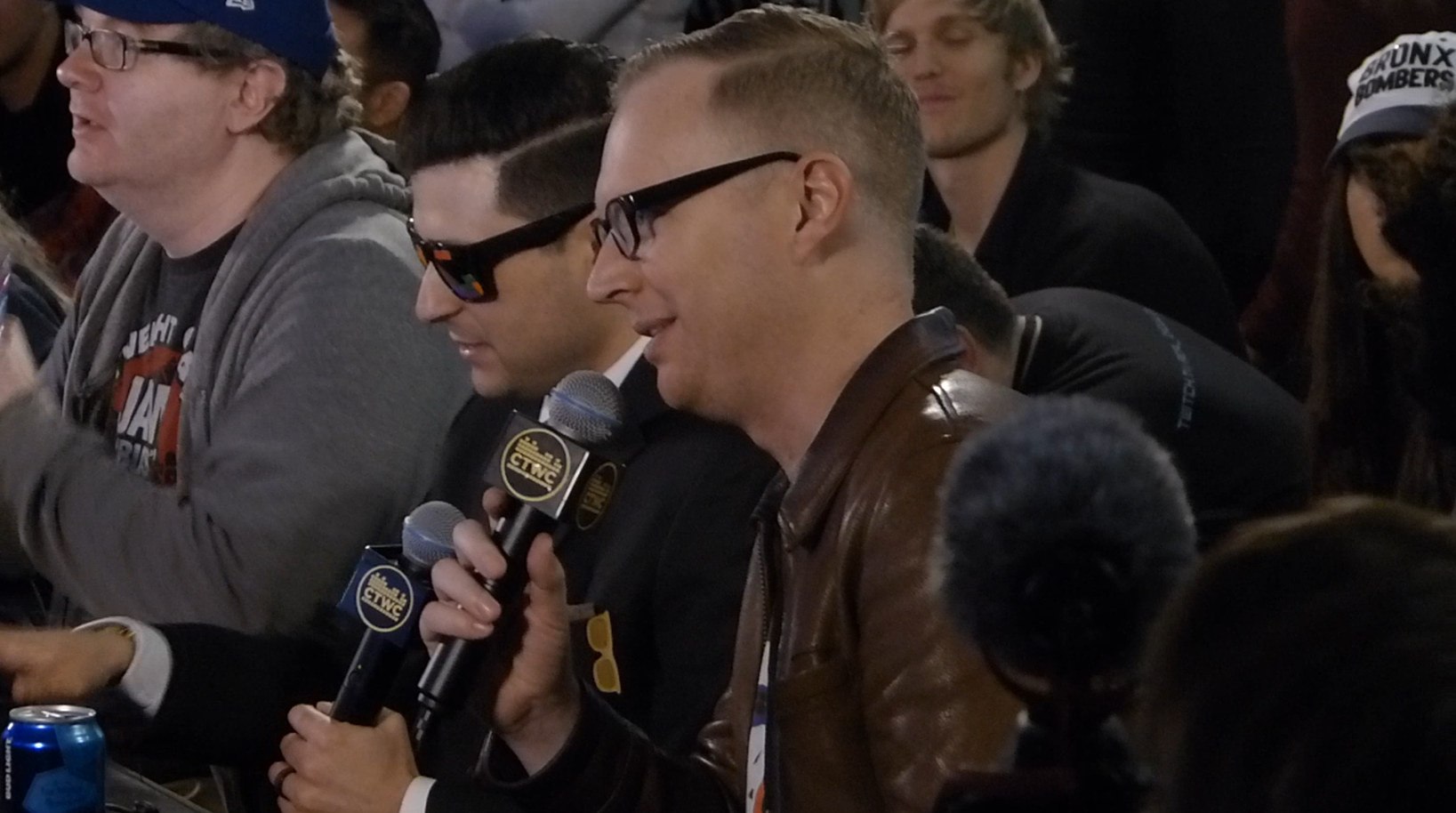
Neubauer speaking at CTWC 2019

Before the 2018 tournament, Neubauer expected increased competition due to the rise of the "hypertapping" style, naming Koji "Koryan" Nishio as the favorite to win the title. After qualifying as the third seed, Neubauer slowly made his way to the semifinals, where he set up a thriller match against first-time competitor Tomohiro "GreenTea" Tatejima. Neubauer was able to defeat Tatejima 2–1 in a close battle to reach the finals for the final time, having done so nine consecutive times in tournaments up to this one. There, he was swept 3–0 by hypertapper Joseph "JdMfX_" Saelee despite setting competition personal bests. During his post-match interview, when asked if he was again contemplating retirement, Neubauer reaffirmed that he planned to keep competing indefinitely regardless of whether he was the favorite to win or not. In 2019, Neubauer returned to the competition, looking to reclaim his title, but he lost the first round 2–1 to veteran competitor Paul "MegaRetroMan" Tesi, marking the first time Neubauer did not reach the finals in a competition.

In 2020, the Classic Tetris World Championship was held online due to the COVID-19 pandemic. Now playing under the Spanish flag as an in-joke in which he was referred to as a man from Albacete, Neubauer qualified as the 31st seed after struggling during qualifying, only managing one max-out. Although expectations were low for DAS players like Neubauer after the domination of hypertapping in past competitions, he was able to make it to the top 16 before being defeated 3–1 by eventual semifinalist Jacob "Huffulufugus" Huff. During his post-match interview, a visibly emotional Neubauer expressed his gratitude and excitement for the ever-rising popularity of the tournament. This was Neubauer's final competition.

=== World record holder ===
In June 2018, Neubauer set a (then) high-score world record of 1,245,200 points.

=== Competitive record ===
This table lists Neubauer's appearances at the CTWC World Championship and their outcomes.

Competitive record of Jonas Neubauer in Classic Tetris
| Year | Tournament | Size | Seed | Score | Place | Ref. |
|---|---|---|---|---|---|---|
| 2010 | CTWC World Championship (Note: one-time use of an unusual tournament format: invites + qualifying; top 8, three rounds of high score challenge, all-versus-all; top 2, best-of-3, one-versus-one) | 8 | N/A | 1–0 | 1st | |
| 2011 | CTWC World Championship (Note: first time use of the standard tournament format: open qualifying; top 8/4/2, single elimination, best-of-3, one-versus-one) | 8 | 1 | 3–0 | 1st | |
| 2012 | CTWC World Championship | 32 | 1 | 5–0 | 1st | |
| 2013 | CTWC World Championship | 32 | 1 | 5–0 | 1st | |
| 2014 | CTWC World Championship | 32 | 2 | 4–1 | 2nd | |
| 2015 | CTWC World Championship | 32 | 4 | 5–0 | 1st | |
| 2016 | CTWC World Championship | 32 | 3 | 5–0 | 1st | |
| 2017 | CTWC World Championship | 32 | 3 | 5–0 | 1st | |
| 2018 | CTWC World Championship | 40 | 3^{†} | 4–1 | 2nd | |
| 2019 | CTWC World Championship | 48 | 3^{†} | 0–1 | 17th–32nd | |
| 2020 | CTWC World Championship (Note: held online due to COVID-19 pandemic) | 64 | 31 | 4–2 | 9th–16th | |

Event host
| CTWC | Classic Tetris World Championship | held in-person (Note: unless indicated otherwise by a footnote) |

Default wins
| ^{†} | single-dagger symbol | high seed after qualifying round, awarding a single bye |

== Other ventures ==
On June 9, 2019, Neubauer was a panelist on ABC's To Tell the Truth, where he was one of three who had to fool celebrities into thinking that he was the Lego Master Builder. After the real Lego Master Builder was revealed, the celebrities then had to figure out which of the two remaining panelists was a performer who walks barefoot on Lego bricks (a "Lego walker"). The celebrities competing during that episode were Oliver Hudson, Justin Long, Snoop Dogg, and Amanda Seales.

== Death and legacy ==
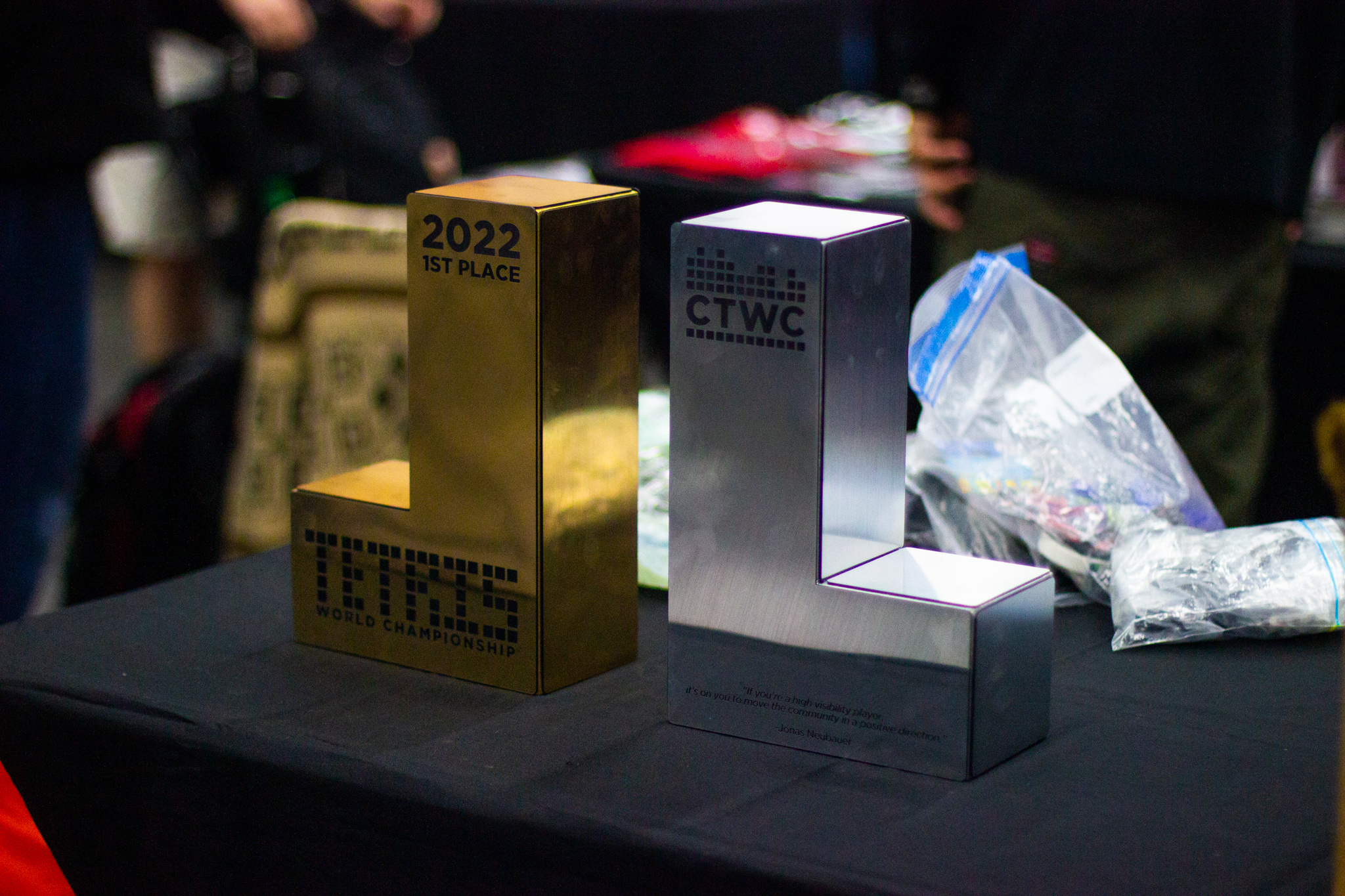
The Jonas Neubauer Memorial Trophy

Neubauer died from a sudden medical emergency on January 5, 2021, at age 39. He had collapsed and never regained consciousness. His death was announced four days later on all of his social media pages. On April 2, 2021, the cause of death was diagnosed as "sudden cardiac death from cardiac arrhythmia of undetermined [cause]".

After Neubauer's death, the Classic Tetris World Championship trophy was renamed the Jonas Neubauer Memorial Trophy, and it was redesigned as a golden J-tetromino (representing "J" for "Jonas"). A quote from a 2018 interview of Jonas is engraved on the trophy: "If you're a high visibility player, it's on you to move the community in a positive direction".

In 2024, the Classic Tetris World Championship was relocated from Portland, Oregon, to Pasadena, California. Portland Retro Gaming Expo, an annual event which had previously hosted the championship from 2012 to 2023, instead inaugurated a Classic Tetris tournament on September 28, 2024, dubbed "The Jonas Neubauer Cup" in his memory. In contrast to the CTWC's ruleset, the Cup is considered North America's premier DAS tournament, as Jonas was Tetris's most successful DAS player. The tournament was held a second time at PRGE in 2025.
